= City Council of Milan =

Italian municipal legistature

City Council of Milan Consiglio Comunale di Milano

History
- Founded: 26 January 1860

Leadership
- President: Elena Buscemi, PD since 21 October 2021
- Mayor: Giuseppe Sala, Ind. since 21 June 2016

Structure
- Seats: 48
- Political groups: Mayoral majority (31): PD (20); Sala List (5); EV (3); A-IV (2); MiS (1); Opposition (17): Lega (6); FdI (5); FI (3); Bernardo List (2); MP (1)
- Length of term: 5 years

Elections
- Voting system: Party-list proportional representation with coalition majority bonus
- Last election: 3-4 October 2021
- Next election: Between 15 April and 15 June 2027

Meeting place
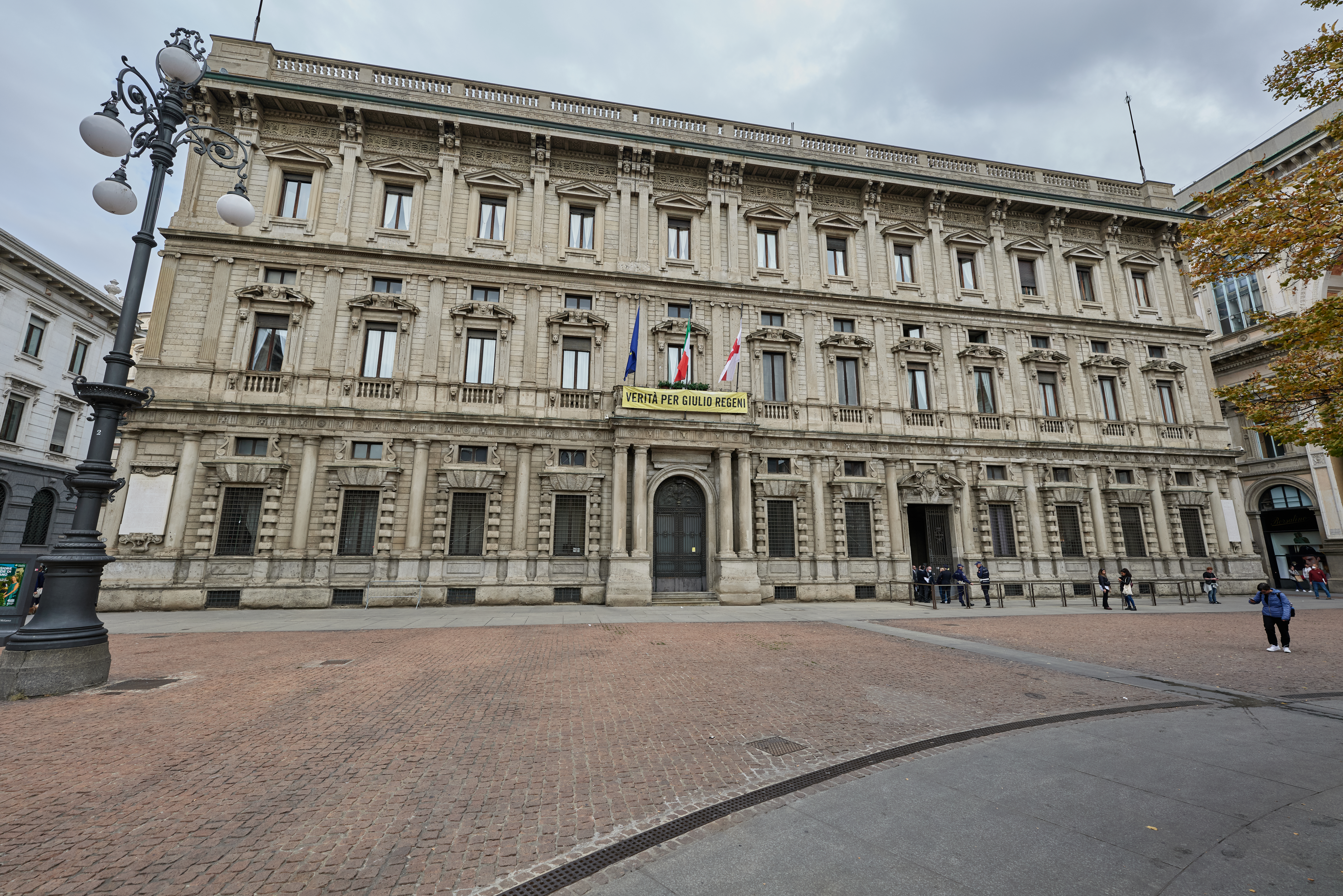
- Palazzo Marino, Piazza della Scala – Milan

Website
- Comune di Milano.it

The City Council of Milan (Italian: Consiglio Comunale di Milano) is the top tier legislative body of the municipality of Milan, Lombardy, Italy. It consists of the directly elected mayor of Milan and of an elected 48-member assembly, which controls the mayor's governing actions and has the authority to enforce his resignation by a motion of no confidence.

The City Council is elected for five-year terms. Its seats are assigned proportionally to each party and list, with a majority bonus being awarded to the winning coalition to guarantee governability. The last election was held on 3 and 4 October 2021.

The City Council meets at Palazzo Marino, located in Piazza della Scala, Municipality 1.

== Composition ==
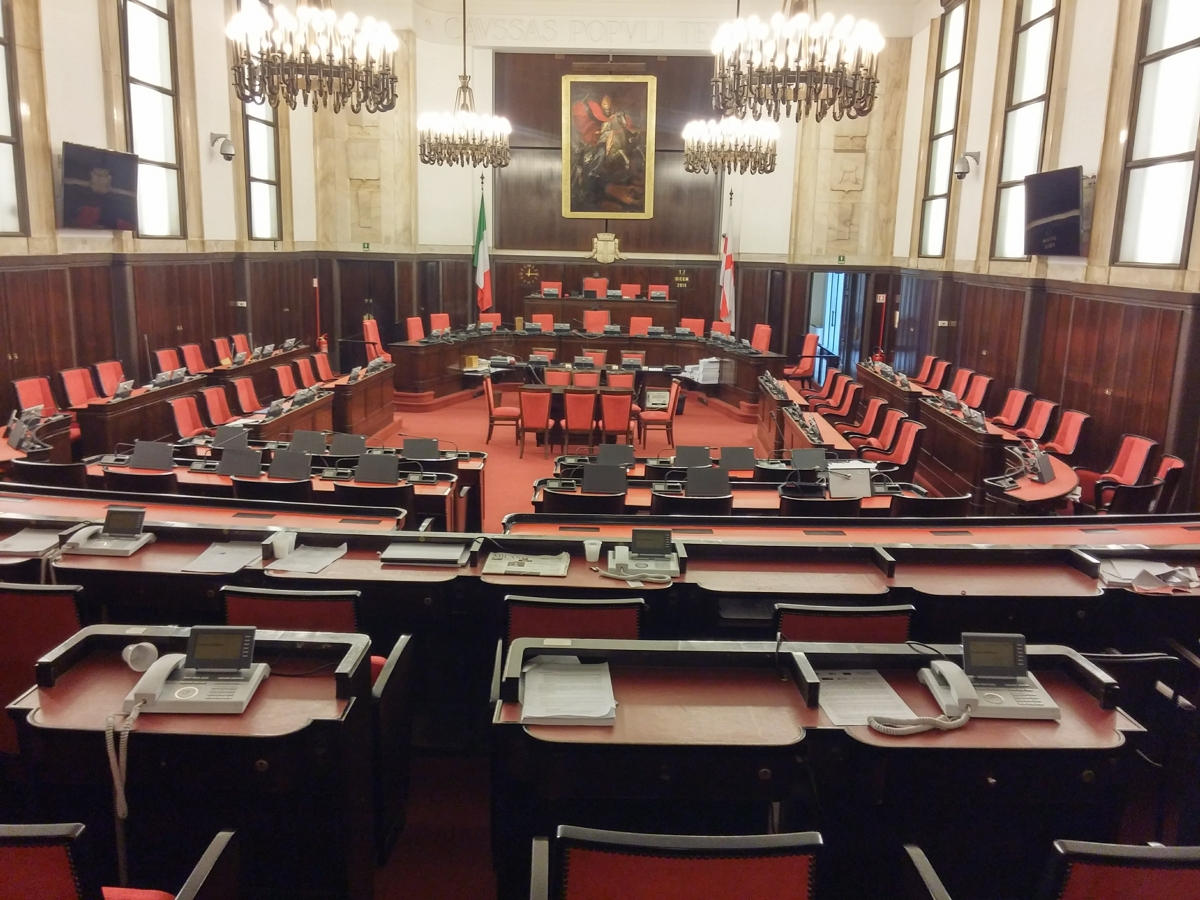
The Council meeting room.

The political system of the comuni of Italy was changed in 1993, when a semi-presidential system for the mayoral election was introduced. Previously, the Council was elected under a pure proportional system and the Council had the power to elect and dismiss the Mayor of Milan; since 1993 the Mayor and the Council are jointly elected by citizens, with an electoral law that assures to the elected Mayor a political majority in the Council.

Under this system, the election of the Mayor is prior over the election of the Council. Voters express a direct choice for the Mayor or an indirect choice voting for the party of the candidate's coalition and this gives a result whereby the winning candidate is able to claim majority support in the new Council. The candidate who is elected Mayor has always a majority of at least 62% of seats (29 seats) in the City Council, which will support him during his term. The seats for each party of the coalition which wins the majority is determined proportionally.

In this type of system, the Council is generally elected for a five-year term, but, if the Mayor suffers a vote of no confidence, resigns or dies, under the simul stabunt, simul cadent clause introduced in 1993 (literally they will stand together or they will fall together), also the Council is dissolved and a snap election is called.

The City Committee (Italian: giunta comunale), the executive body of the city, chosen and presided directly by the Mayor, is generally composed by members of the City Council, but also by external members.

=== Current composition (2021–2027) ===
The City Council of is currently composed of the following political groups:

Party	Seats	Status
Democratic Party (PD)	20 / 48	In government
Lega	6 / 48	In opposition
Sala for Mayor	5 / 48	In government
Brothers of Italy (FdI)	5 / 48	In opposition
Green Europe (EV)	3 / 48	In government
Forza Italia (FI)	3 / 48	In opposition
Action – Italia Viva (A-IV)	2 / 48	In government
Bernardo for Mayor	2 / 48	In opposition
Healthy Milan (MiS)	1 / 48	In government
Popular Milan (MP)	1 / 48	In opposition

By coalition:

Coalition	Seats	Status
Centre-left coalition	31 / 48	Mayoral majority
Centre-right coalition	17 / 48	Opposition

=== City Committee (2021–2027) ===
The current City Committee (Italian: giunta comunale) is composed by the Mayor along with 11 members and has been in office since 8 October 2021:

Portfolio	Officeholder	Party
Mayor	Giuseppe Sala	Ind
Deputy Mayor	Anna Scavuzzo	PD
Education, Urban Planning	Anna Scavuzzo	PD
Welfare and Health	Lamberto Bertolè	PD
Housing	Fabio Bottero	PD
Sustainable mobility	Arianna Censi	PD
Budget	Emmanuel Conte	PD
Public Works, Civil Protection	Marco Granelli	PD
Suburbs, Administrative decentralization, Municipal services	Gaia Romani	PD
Economic development, Labour policies	Alessia Cappello	A-IV
Environment and Public Green	Elena Grandi	EV
Sport, Tourism, Youth Policies	Martina Riva	Ind
Culture	Tommaso Sacchi	Ind

== Functions ==
The Council acts as the supreme legislative body of the city. It is convened and chaired by a speaker (president del consiglio comunale) appointed by the Council itself.

The Council can decide over programs and public works projects, institution and system of taxes, the general rules for the use of goods and services, forecasting and reporting financial statements. Resolution basic acts attributed by law to its competence are the municipal statute, the regulations, the general criteria on the structure of offices and services.

After the creation of the Metropolitan City of Milan in 2015, which with its Metropolitan Council has the power to coordinate the municipalities around Milan in providing basic services (including transport, school and social programs) and environment protection as the old Province of Milan did, the 2016 municipal administrative reform delegated to the 9 administrative Boroughs Councils of Milan some advisory functions related to local services, such as schools, social services, waste collection, roads, parks, libraries and local commerce.

== City Hall ==
The City Council is seated at Palazzo Marino, a 16th-century palace located in Piazza della Scala, in the centre of Milan, Italy. Palazzo Marino has been Milan's city hall since 9 September 1861. It borders on Piazza San Fedele, Piazza della Scala, Via Case Rotte and Via Tommaso Marino.

The palace was built for, and is named after, the Genoan trader and banker Tommaso Marino. It became a property of the State in 1781.

The current Council meeting room was inaugurated on 30 June 1953. A ciceronian inscription from the previous meeting place of the Council – the notorious Sala Alessi on the second floor of the palace – is reported on the marble walls around the room:

QVAE IN PATRIBVS AGENTVR MODICA SVNTVR · CAVSSAS POPVLI TENETO · VIS ABESTO

Without personal interests · keep the people in mind · without (using) force

== Presidents ==
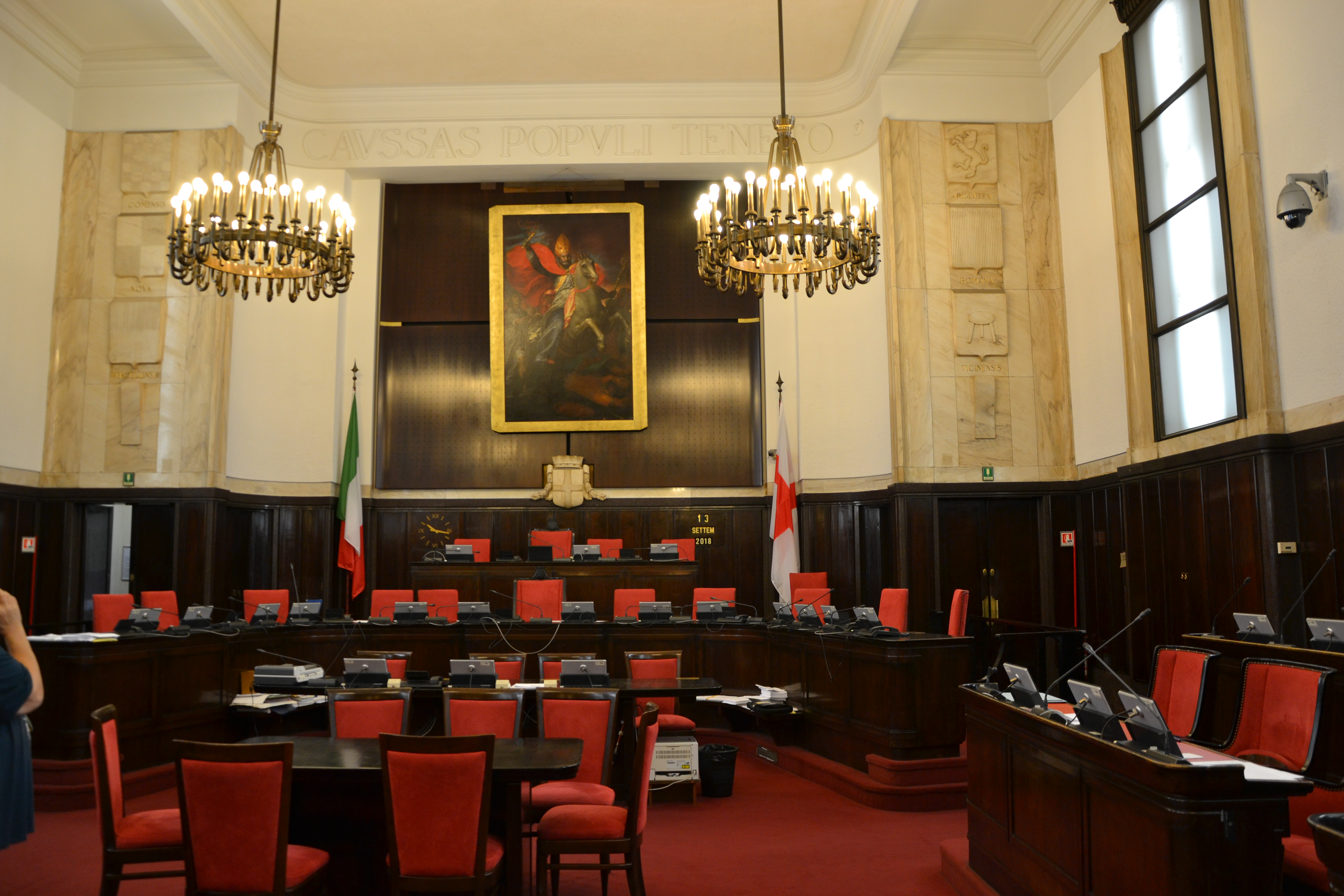
A view of the Council meeting room inside Palazzo Marino

This is a list of the presidents (Italian: presidenti del consiglio comunale) of the City Council since the 1993 electoral reform:

Name	Period		Legislature start date
Elena Gazzola (LN)	20 July 1993	3 July 1995 (Note: Resigned after being elected regional councillor.)	20 June 1993
Maria Letizia Gilardelli (Ind)	3 July 1995	12 May 1997	20 June 1993
Massimo De Carolis (FI)	16 June 1997	21 March 2000 (Note: Resigned.)	12 May 1997
Giovanni Marra (FI)	27 March 2000	14 May 2001	12 May 1997
Giovanni Marra (FI)	24 May 2001	6 April 2004 (Note: Died in office.)	14 May 2001
Vincenzo Giudice (FI)	19 April 2004	1 June 2006	14 May 2001
Manfredi Palmeri (FI)	9 June 2006	1 June 2011	1 June 2006
Basilio Rizzo (PRC)	20 June 2011	21 June 2016	1 June 2011
Lamberto Bertolè (PD)	7 July 2016	6 October 2021	21 June 2016
Elena Buscemi (PD)	21 October 2021	Incumbent	6 October 2021

== Political composition ==
=== Historical composition ===
Election	DC	PCI	PSI	PLI	PRI	PSDI	MSI	Others
7 April 1946	22	20	29	6	2	0	0	1
27 May 1951	30	13	8	6	2	15	4	2
27 May 1956	25	15	16	5	0	10	4	3
6 November 1960	25	17	17	6	0	8	5	2
22 November 1964	20	18	13	17	0	7	4	1
7 June 1970	22	19	12	9	4	8	4	2
15 June 1975	22	25	12	3	4	5	6	3
8 June 1980	22	22	16	5	3	4	5	3
12 May 1985	20	21	16	3	8	2	6	4
6 May 1990	17	16	16	0	5	0	3	23

Election	Majority	Opposition	Total	Mayor
6 June 1993	LN 36 / 60	Progressives 13 / 60 DC–PS 8 / 60 SR 2 / 60 MSI 1 / 60	60	Marco Formentini (1993–1997)
27 April 1997	Centre-right 36 / 60	Centre-left 12 / 60 LN 8 / 60 PRC 4 / 60	60	Gabriele Albertini (1997–2006)
13 May 2001	Centre-right 36 / 60	Centre-left 19 / 60 IdV 3 / 60 FdV 2 / 60	60	Gabriele Albertini (1997–2006)
28 May 2006	Centre-right 36 / 60	Centre-left 24 / 60	60	Letizia Moratti (2006–2011)
15 May 2011	Centre-left 29 / 48	Centre-right 17 / 48 NP 1 / 48 M5S 1 / 48	48	Giuliano Pisapia (2011–2016)
5 June 2016	Centre-left 29 / 48	Centre-right 15 / 48 M5S 3 / 48 PRC 1 / 48	48	Giuseppe Sala (since 2016)
3 October 2021	Centre-left 31 / 48	Centre-right 17 / 48	48	Giuseppe Sala (since 2016)

== Election ==
Summary of the 3–4 October 2021 Milan City Council election results
Parties and coalitions		Votes	%	Seats
Democratic Party (Partito Democratico)	PD	152,200	33.86	20
Sala for Mayor (Sala Sindaco)	SS	41,135	9.15	5
Green Europe (Europa Verde)	EV	22,994	5.11	3
The Reformers (I Riformisti)	IV-A	18,049	4.01	2
Healthy Milan (Milano in Salute)	MiS	7,367	1.64	1
United Milan (Milano Unita)	MU	7,012	1.56	0
Radical Milan (Milano Radicale)	MR	4,816	1.07	0
Volt Europa	V	2,052	0.56	0
Sala coalition (Centre-left)		256,075	56.96	31
Lega	Lega	48,283	10.74	6
Brothers of Italy (Fratelli d'Italia)	FdI	43,889	9.76	5
Forza Italia	FI	31,819	7.08	3
Bernardo for Mayor (Bernardo Sindaco)	BS	14,055	3.13	2
Popular Milan (Milano Popolare)	MP	8,367	1.86	1
European Liberal Party	PLE	970	0.22	0
Bernardo coalition (Centre-right)		147,383	32.78	17
Paragone for Mayor–Great North		12,974	2.89	0
Five Star Movement (Movimento Cinque Stelle)	M5S	12,517	2.78	0
Milan in Common (Milano in Comune)	MC	7,175	1.60	0
Others		12,989	2.99	0
Total		449,563	100.00	48
Votes cast / turnout		491,141	47.72	
Eligible voters		1,029,232		
Source: Ministry of the Interior Archived 2021-10-16 at the Wayback Machine

Popular vote
PD	33.86%
Lega	10.74%
FdI	9.76%
Sala for Mayor	9.15%
FI	7.08%
EV	5.11%
Others	24.21%

Council Seats
PD	41.66%
Lega	12.50%
FdI	10.41%
Sala for Mayor	10.41%
FI	6.25%
EV	6.25%
Others	10.41%

Popular vote (coalition)
Centre-left	56.96%
Centre-right	32.78%

Council Seats (coalition)
Centre-left	64.58%
Centre-right	35.42%
