= 1997 Milan municipal election =

Election held for Milan legislature

← 1993	27 April 1997 (first round); 11 May 1997 (second round)	2001 →
- Turnout: 71.9% ▼6.2 pp (first round); 65.8% ▼6.1 pp (second round)
- Mayoral election
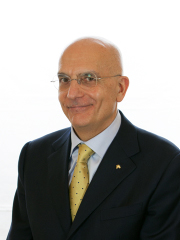

Candidate	Gabriele Albertini	Aldo Fumagalli
Party	Forza Italia	Independent
Alliance	Centre-right	Centre-left
1st Round vote	318,063	214,728
Percentage	40.7%	27.5%
2nd Round vote	385,496	339,942
Percentage	53.1%	46.9%
Mayor before election
Marco Formentini
LN
Elected mayor
Gabriele Albertini
FI
- City Council election
- All 60 seats in City Council; 31 seats needed for a majority
Party	Leader	Vote %	Seats	+/–
Centre-right	Gabriele Albertini	43.75	36	+36
Centre-left	Aldo Fumagalli	25.54	12	−1
LN	Marco Formentini	16.23	8	−28
PRC	Umberto Gay	9.12	4	−2
This lists parties that won seats. See the complete results below.

Municipal elections were held in Milan on 27 April and 11 May 1997 to elect the Mayor of Milan and the 60 members of the City Council.

As no candidate won a majority in the first round, a runoff was held between the top two candidates – Gabriele Albertini, a businessman close to Silvio Berlusconi's Forza Italia (FI) and Aldo Fumagalli, a young businessman and former president of Milan Young Entrepreneurs' Confederation, supported by The Olive Tree coalition – which Albertini won by a decisive margin.

The incumbent Mayor Marco Formentini came third and couldn't access to the second round of the election.

== Background ==
During the previous years, the incumbent mayor Marco Formentini was repeatedly criticized for his controversial administrative choices. In August 1994 his decision to move the far-left self-managed social centre Leoncavallo from its historic headquarters to a small warehouse resulted in many violent clashes between activists and police in several streets across the city. In November 1995 he struggled to handle an unprecedented waste management crisis which resulted in mountains of garbage left not collected in the streets. In February 1996 his administration was put at risk by an inquiry on an alleged abuse of power which overwhelmed the deputy Mayor and some members of the municipal executive: in May 1996 Formentini hardly survived a motion of no confidence in the City Council thanks to the support of two councillors of the opposition parties. His decision to seek re-election was seen by many as a hard and unrealistic move.

Against the Mayor, the newborn Forza Italia party (FI) presented its own mayoral candidate: the businessman Gabriele Albertini, president of the Italian Mechanical Engineers' Trade Union Federation. Seen as a member of the catholic milanese middle class, Albertini was the right profile for represent the new political experiment led by the milanese successful businessman and former Prime Minister Silvio Berlusconi. Forza Italia and Pole for Freedoms coalition's aim was to attract moderate voters who were "disoriented, political orphans and who risked being unrepresented" (as Berlusconi described them), especially after the Democratic Party of the Left (PDS) (the direct heir of the Italian Communist Party) had been able to win the 1996 national general election and enter in government for the first time since 1947. At the same time in March 1997 the centre-left government's popularity was sinking, especially because of its handling of the Albanian unrest which resulted in a huge number of Albanian refugees admitted to Italy and redistributed across the country with the subsequent protest of many right-wing parties and movements.

Despite a common position upon the Albanian refugees problem, at the local level right-wing forces were unable to find a deal. In December 1994 Northern League leader Umberto Bossi had broken the alliance with Berlusconi, causing his government to fall. As a consequence of this political split which was still unresolved after three years and because of Formentini's unstable administration, the centre-right Pole for Freedoms coalition finally decided to rule out a possible alliance with the Northern League (LN).

The centre-left coalition decided to present the 38-years old independent businessman Aldo Fumagalli as its mayoral candidate. As a consequence of the frequent tensions with Prime Minister Romano Prodi, the far-left Communist Refoundation Party (PRC) decided to broke the alliance with the centre-left at the local level and presented the civil rights activistic Umberto Gay as candidate for Mayor.

== Voting system ==
The semipresidential voting system was the one used for all mayoral elections in Italy of cities with a population higher than 15,000 for the second time. Under this system voters express a direct choice for the Mayor or an indirect choice voting for the party of the candidate's coalition. If no candidate receives at least 50% of votes, the top two candidates go to a second round after two weeks. This gives a result whereby the winning candidate may be able to claim majority support.

The election of the City Council is based on a direct choice for the candidate with a preference vote: the candidate with the majority of the preferences is elected. The number of the seats for each losing party is determined proportionally.

== Parties and candidates ==
This is a list of the major parties (and their respective leaders) which participated in the election.

Political party or alliance	Constituent lists	Candidate
Communist Refoundation Party		Umberto Gay
Centre-left coalition (The Olive Tree)	Democratic Party of the Left	Aldo Fumagalli
Centre-left coalition (The Olive Tree)	Italian People's Party	Aldo Fumagalli
Centre-left coalition (The Olive Tree)	Federation of the Greens	Aldo Fumagalli
Centre-left coalition (The Olive Tree)	Others	Aldo Fumagalli
Northern League		Marco Formentini
Centre-right coalition (Pole for Freedoms)	Forza Italia	Gabriele Albertini
Centre-right coalition (Pole for Freedoms)	National Alliance	Gabriele Albertini
Centre-right coalition (Pole for Freedoms)	Christian Democratic Centre	Gabriele Albertini
Centre-right coalition (Pole for Freedoms)	Others	Gabriele Albertini

== Results ==
Gabriele Albertini won the election on the second round and on 12 May 1997 he was officially declared the new Mayor of Milan. At that time he led the very first right-wing municipal administration in the history of the city.

Summary of the 1997 Milan City Council and Mayoral election results
Candidates	1st round		2nd round		Leader's seat	Parties	Votes	%	Seats
Candidates	Votes	%	Votes	%	Leader's seat	Parties	Votes	%	Seats
Gabriele Albertini	318,063	40.71	385,496	53.14	–	Forza Italia – United Christian Democrats	192,814	29.76	25
Gabriele Albertini	318,063	40.71	385,496	53.14	–	National Alliance	77,134	11.90	10
Gabriele Albertini	318,063	40.71	385,496	53.14	–	Christian Democratic Centre	9,337	1.44	1
Gabriele Albertini	318,063	40.71	385,496	53.14	–	Federalist Party – Liberals – Union of the Centre	2,314	0.36	–
Gabriele Albertini	318,063	40.71	385,496	53.14	–	Pensioners' Party	1,879	0.29	–
Gabriele Albertini	318,063	40.71	385,496	53.14	–	Total	283,478	43.75	36
Aldo Fumagalli	214,728	27.48	339,942	46.86	check	Democratic Party of the Left	120,999	18.67	9
Aldo Fumagalli	214,728	27.48	339,942	46.86	check	Italian People's Party	18,239	2.82	1
Aldo Fumagalli	214,728	27.48	339,942	46.86	check	Federation of the Greens	17,148	2.65	1
Aldo Fumagalli	214,728	27.48	339,942	46.86	check	Democratic Italy	5,929	0.92	–
Aldo Fumagalli	214,728	27.48	339,942	46.86	check	Pact for Milan	3,191	0.49	–
Aldo Fumagalli	214,728	27.48	339,942	46.86	check	Total	165,506	25.54	11
Marco Formentini	149,501	19.14	–	–	check	Northern League	100,184	15.46	7
Marco Formentini	149,501	19.14	–	–	check	Padanian Workers	2,141	0.33	–
Marco Formentini	149,501	19.14	–	–	check	Padania Safe Pension	1,611	0.25	–
Marco Formentini	149,501	19.14	–	–	check	Craftsmen Traders Industrialists	1,200	0.19	–
Marco Formentini	149,501	19.14	–	–	check	Total	105,136	16.23	7
Umberto Gay	62,897	8.05	–	–	check	Communist Refoundation Party	59,101	9.12	3
Giorgio Santerini	7,154	0.92	–	–	–	United Socialists (SI – PS)	7,337	1.13	–
Giancarlo Cito	5,879	0.75	–	–	–	Southern Action League	5,539	0.85	–
Tomaso Staiti di Cuddia delle Chiuse	5,020	0.64	–	–	–	Tricolour Flame	4,686	0.72	–
Antonio Marinoni	4,864	0.62	–	–	–	Italian Renewal	4,570	0.71	–
Giorgio Schultze	3,248	0.42	–	–	–	Humanist Party	2,963	0.46	–
Marco Tordelli	2,758	0.35	–	–	–	Federal Italy	2,594	0.40	–
Giovanni Bucci	2,005	0.26	–	–	–	FederItalia	1,895	0.29	–
Ugo Sarao	1,956	0.25	–	–	–	Pensions and Work	1,864	0.29	–
Giovanni Fabbrini	1,487	0.19	–	–	–	Out of the Lie	1,536	0.24	–
Sergio Bontempelli	947	0.12	–	–	–	Civil City	1,019	0.16	–
Ugo Frisoli	754	0.10	–	–	–	United Italy	697	0.11	–
Total	781,261	100.00	725,438	100.00	3		647,921	100.00	57
Eligible voters	1,143,462	100.00	1,143,462	100.00					
Did not vote	321,043	28.08	390,653	34.16					
Voted	822,419	71.92	752,809	65.84					
Blank or invalid ballots	53,900	1.5	35,229	2.1					
Total valid votes	781,261	98.5	725,438	97.9					
Source: Ministry of the Interior
