= 2006 Milan municipal election =

Municipal elections held in Milan in 2006

- 28–29 May 2006
- Turnout: 67.5% ▼14.8 pp
- Mayoral election
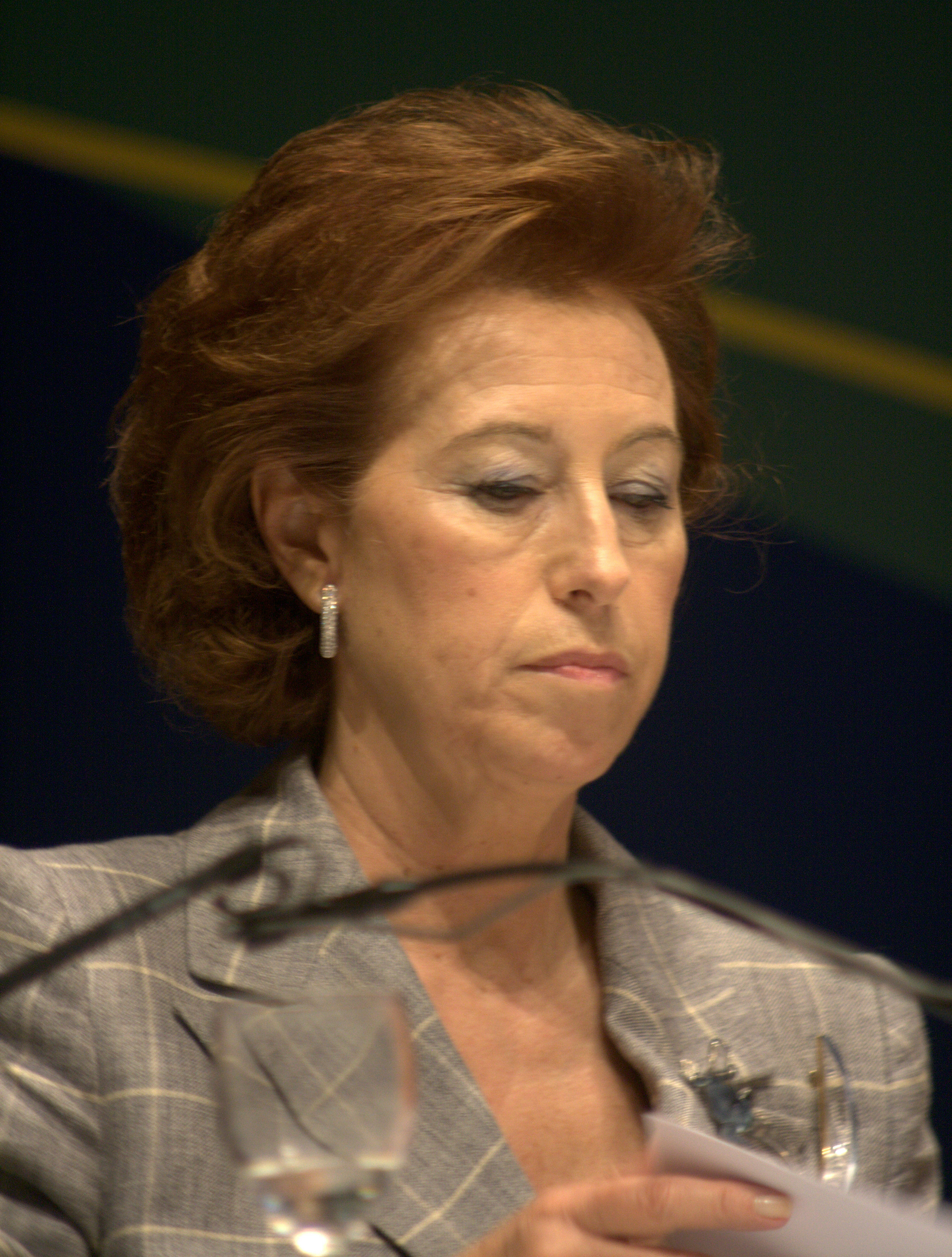

Candidate	Letizia Moratti	Bruno Ferrante
Party	Forza Italia	Independent
Alliance	Centre-right	Centre-left
Popular vote	353,410	319,487
Percentage	51.9%	46.9%
Mayor before election
Gabriele Albertini
FI
Elected mayor
Letizia Moratti
FI
- City Council election
- All 60 seats in City Council; 31 seats needed for a majority
Party	Leader	Vote %	Seats	+/–
Centre-right	Letizia Moratti	54.28	36	0
Centre-left	Bruno Ferrante	44.65	24	+5
This lists parties that won seats. See the complete results below.

Municipal elections were held in Milan on 28–29 May 2006, to elect the Mayor of Milan and the 60 members of the City Council.

The incumbent Mayor Gabriele Albertini was term-limited and could not run for a third term.

The main candidates were the incumbent Minister of Education Letizia Moratti, supported by Silvio Berlusconi's centre-right coalition House of Freedoms, and the former prefect of Milan Bruno Ferrante, supported by the centre-left coalition The Union.

As a result of the election, Letizia Moratti was officially proclaimed new Mayor of Milan on 1 June 2006, becoming the first female to fill the office.

== Background ==
=== Centre-left primary election ===
In December 2005 the centre-left coalition decided to call an open primary election to choose its mayoral candidate. Four people registered to be candidates in this election: Bruno Ferrante, former prefect of Milan (2000–2005); Dario Fo, playwright and 1997 Nobel Prize in Literature; Milly Moratti, environmentalist activist; and Dario Corritore, an independent business executive.

The election took place on 29 January 2006:

Candidate	Supported by	Votes (%)
Bruno Ferrante	DS, DL	67.85%
Dario Fo	PRC	23.09%
Milly Moratti	FdV	5.78%
Davide Corritore	none	3.28%
Total		100.00

Total voters: 82,496

== Voting System ==
The semipresidential voting system was the one used for all mayoral elections in Italy of cities with a population higher than 15,000 for the fourth time. Under this system voters express a direct choice for the Mayor or an indirect choice voting for the party of the candidate's coalition. If no candidate receives at least 50% of votes, the top two candidates go to a second round after two weeks. This gives a result whereby the winning candidate may be able to claim majority support.

The election of the City Council is based on a direct choice for the candidate with a preference vote: the candidate with the majority of the preferences is elected. The number of the seats for each losing party is determined proportionally.

== Parties and candidates ==
This is a list of the major parties (and their respective leaders) which participated in the election.

Political party or alliance	Constituent lists	Candidate
Centre-left coalition (The Union)	The Olive Tree	Bruno Ferrante
Centre-left coalition (The Union)	Communist Refoundation Party	Bruno Ferrante
Centre-left coalition (The Union)	Party of Italian Communists	Bruno Ferrante
Centre-left coalition (The Union)	Rose in the Fist	Bruno Ferrante
Centre-left coalition (The Union)	Federation of the Greens	Bruno Ferrante
Centre-left coalition (The Union)	Italy of Values	Bruno Ferrante
Centre-right coalition (House of Freedoms)	Forza Italia	Letizia Moratti
Centre-right coalition (House of Freedoms)	National Alliance	Letizia Moratti
Centre-right coalition (House of Freedoms)	Northern League	Letizia Moratti
Centre-right coalition (House of Freedoms)	Union of Christian and Centre Democrats	Letizia Moratti

== Results ==
Summary of the 2006 Milan City Council and Mayoral election results
Candidates	Votes	%	Leader's seat	Parties	Votes	%	Seats
Letizia Moratti	353,410	51.97	–	Forza Italia	194,995	32.22	24
Letizia Moratti	353,410	51.97	–	National Alliance	51,801	8.56	6
Letizia Moratti	353,410	51.97	–	Letizia Moratti List	30,781	5.09	3
Letizia Moratti	353,410	51.97	–	Northern League	22,702	3.75	2
Letizia Moratti	353,410	51.97	–	Union of Christian and Centre Democrats	14,713	2.43	1
Letizia Moratti	353,410	51.97	–	Pensions and Work	3,537	0.58	–
Letizia Moratti	353,410	51.97	–	Christian Democracy for Autonomies	2,560	0.42	–
Letizia Moratti	353,410	51.97	–	Social Action	2,305	0.38	–
Letizia Moratti	353,410	51.97	–	Tricolour Flame	1,634	0.27	–
Letizia Moratti	353,410	51.97	–	Young people for Milan	1,418	0.23	–
Letizia Moratti	353,410	51.97	–	New Italian Socialist Party	920	0.15	–
Letizia Moratti	353,410	51.97	–	Pensioners and Disabled	879	0.15	–
Letizia Moratti	353,410	51.97	–	S.O.S. Italy	230	0.04	–
Letizia Moratti	353,410	51.97	–	Total	328,475	54.28	36
Bruno Ferrante	319,487	46.98	check	The Olive Tree	133,315	22.03	14
Bruno Ferrante	319,487	46.98	check	Ferrante List	45,501	7.52	4
Bruno Ferrante	319,487	46.98	check	Communist Refoundation Party	25,252	4.17	2
Bruno Ferrante	319,487	46.98	check	Federation of the Greens	20,346	3.36	2
Bruno Ferrante	319,487	46.98	check	United with Dario Fo	12,821	2.12	1
Bruno Ferrante	319,487	46.98	check	Party of Italian Communists	9,345	1.54	–
Bruno Ferrante	319,487	46.98	check	Italy of Values	8,843	1.46	–
Bruno Ferrante	319,487	46.98	check	Rose in the Fist	8,563	1.41	–
Bruno Ferrante	319,487	46.98	check	Pensioners' Party	3,654	0.60	–
Bruno Ferrante	319,487	46.98	check	Union of Democrats for Europe	1,989	0.33	–
Bruno Ferrante	319,487	46.98	check	Consumers' List	603	0.10	–
Bruno Ferrante	319,487	46.98	check	Total	270,232	44.65	23
Giorgio Ballabio	1,329	0.20	–	Your Milan	1,323	0.22	–
Cesare Fracca	1,220	0.18	–	Living Milan	1,169	0.19	–
Gabriele Pagliuzzi	1,187	0.17	–	Liberal Right – Federal Europe	935	0.15	–
Ambrogio Crespi	1,086	0.16	–	Liberal-Democratic Socialists – No ICI	853	0.14	–
Valerio Colombo	752	0.11	–	Humanist Party	696	0.12	–
Alberto Beniamino Saiabene	676	0.10	–	This is a City	690	0.11	–
Sante Gaiardoni	523	0.08	–	Sante Gaiardoni List	435	0.07	–
Pietro Vangeli	392	0.06	–	Communist List	370	0.06	–
Total	680,062	100.00	1		605,178	100.00	59
Eligible voters	1,030,616	100.00					
Did not vote	334,074	32.48					
Voted	695,912	67.52					
Blank or invalid ballots	15,850	2.3					
Total valid votes	680,062	97.7					
Source: Ministry of the Interior
