= 1993 Milan municipal election =

- 6 June 1993 (first round); 20 June 1993 (second round)
- Turnout: 78.1% ▼6.7 pp (first round); 69.3% ▼8.8 pp (second round)
- Mayoral election
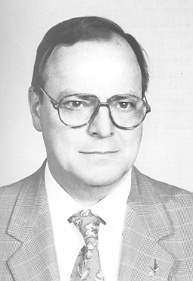

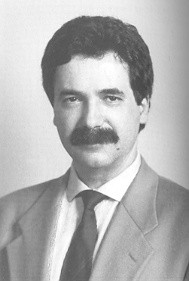
| Candidate | Marco Formentini | Nando Dalla Chiesa |
| Party | Northern League | The Network |
| Alliance | — | Progressives |
| 1st Round vote | 346,425 | 270,554 |
| Percentage | 38.8% | 30.4% |
| 2nd Round vote | 452,732 | 340,708 |
| Percentage | 57.1% | 42.9% |
Mayor before election
Claudio Gelati
(Special commissioner)
Elected mayor
Marco Formentini
LN
- City Council election
- All 60 seats in City Council; 31 seats needed for a majority
| Party | Leader | Vote % | Seats | +/– |
|---|---|---|---|---|
| Northern League | Marco Formentini | 40.86 | 36 | +25 |
| Progressives | Nando Dalla Chiesa | 28.25 | 13 | |
| Centrist coalition | Piero Bassetti | 10.79 | 5 | −13 |
| Pact with Milan | Adriano Teso | 6.89 | 3 | |
| Socialists and Reformists | Giampiero Borghini | 5.35 | 2 | −14 |
| Social Movement | Riccardo De Corato | 3.35 | 1 | −2 |
This lists parties that won seats. See the complete results below.

Municipal elections were held in Milan on 6 and 20 June 1993 to elect the Mayor of Milan and the 60 members of the City Council.

For the first time under a new local electoral law, enacted on 25 March 1993, citizens could vote to directly elect the Mayor.

As no candidate won a majority in the first round, a runoff was held between the top two candidates – Marco Formentini, a former socialist partisan and lawyer at that time member of the newborn regionalist Northern League (LN) and Nando Dalla Chiesa, son of general Carlo Alberto Dalla Chiesa and member of the newborn christian-leftist The Network (LR) – which Formentini won by a decisive margin.

== Background ==
After gaining 11 seats in the City Council in 1990 election, for the first time the newborn regionalist Northern League (LN) presented its own mayoral candidate: the partisan and lawyer Marco Formentini. Formentini was a former socialist, politically a left-wing, and for this reason he was considered a strong candidate in a city like Milan, historically close to leftist ideas but at the same time attracted by the new proposals of the Northern League party. The resentment against Rome's centralism (with the famous slogan Roma ladrona, which loosely means "Rome big thief") and the Italian government, common in northern Italy as many northerners felt that the government wasted resources collected mostly from northerners' taxes, was very strong and resentment against illegal immigrants was widespread. Finally, the Tangentopoli corruption scandals, which started right in Milan and invested most of the established parties, were unveiled from 1992 on and broke the traditional link between the city and the powerful milanese Socialist Party. A Northern League candidate in Milan was not considered a conservative also because the lombard wing and, more broadly, the bulk of the original Lombard League has tended to be the left wing of the party. More of the members of the Lombard League hailed from the far-left of the political spectrum, having been active in the Italian Communist Party, the Party of Proletarian Unity, Proletarian Democracy and the Greens, and conceived Northern League as a centre-left (and, to some extent, social-democratic) political force.

The main opposition to Formentini was represented by Nando Dalla Chiesa, son of the general Carlo Alberto, killed by the Mafia in 1982. Dalla Chiesa was supported by the left-wing coalition of the Progressives, an alliance composed by the former communist Democratic Party of the Left (PDS) and some other progressives party (such as the new-born Federation of the Greens and Communist Refoundation Party).

=== Campaign ===
The electoral campaign was characterized by a strongly polarized debate, with Dalla Chiesa repeatedly warning that if Formentini would have won the city would have experienced a "new regime, more arrogant than during the craxism and a violent one, not just with words". Meanwhile the Northern League leader Umberto Bossi defined Dalla Chiesa "ignorant" and offensively renamed him "Nando Cosa Nostra". In his attempt to gain support from voters disappointed by the Tangentopoli scandal, on the eve of the election Bossi said that Dalla Chiesa was a member of those "elite clubs which pretended to defend the people but were just part of an ancient regime totally disinterested in the needs of the people".

== Voting system ==
The new semipresidential voting system was used for all mayoral elections in Italy of cities with a population higher than 15,000 for the first time. Under this system voters express a direct choice for the Mayor or an indirect choice voting for the party of the candidate's coalition. If no candidate receives at least 50% of votes, the top two candidates go to a second round after two weeks. This gives a result whereby the winning candidate may be able to claim majority support.

The election of the City Council is based on a direct choice for the candidate with a preference vote: the candidate with the majority of the preferences is elected. The number of the seats for each losing party is determined proportionally.

== Parties and candidates ==
This is a list of the major parties (and their respective leaders) which participated in the election.

| Political party or alliance | Constituent lists | Candidate |
|---|---|---|
| Progressives | Democratic Party of the Left | Nando Dalla Chiesa |
| Progressives | Communist Refoundation Party | Nando Dalla Chiesa |
| Progressives | The Network | Nando Dalla Chiesa |
| Progressives | Federation of the Greens | Nando Dalla Chiesa |
| Socialists and Reformists | | Giampiero Borghini |
| Segni Pact | | Adriano Teso |
| Centrist coalition | Christian Democracy | Piero Bassetti |
| Centrist coalition | Italian Democratic Socialist Party | Piero Bassetti |
| Northern League | | Marco Formentini |
| Italian Social Movement | | Riccardo De Corato |

== Results ==
Although Dalla Chiesa was seen as a man outside the old corrupted parties, Formentini managed to win the support of the moderate and centrist voters of the agonizing Christian Democracy (DC) party.

On 20 June 1993 Formentini heavily won the election and became the first directly elected mayor of Milan, the first one from a non-socialist party since 1945.

The future secretary of the Northern League party, Matteo Salvini, was firstly elected municipal councillor, aged 20.

Summary of the 1993 Milan City Council and Mayoral election results
| Candidates | 1st round | | 2nd round | | Leader's seat | Parties | Votes | % | Seats |
| Candidates | Votes | % | Votes | % | Leader's seat | Parties | Votes | % | Seats |
|---|---|---|---|---|---|---|---|---|---|
| Marco Formentini | 346,537 | 38.82 | 452,868 | 57.08 | – | Northern League | 307,122 | 40.86 | 36 |
| Nando dalla Chiesa | 271,294 | 30.39 | 340,553 | 42.92 | check | Communist Refoundation Party | 85,349 | 11.36 | 6 |
| Nando dalla Chiesa | 271,294 | 30.39 | 340,553 | 42.92 | check | Democratic Party of the Left | 66,250 | 8.81 | 4 |
| Nando dalla Chiesa | 271,294 | 30.39 | 340,553 | 42.92 | check | The Network | 26,884 | 3.58 | 1 |
| Nando dalla Chiesa | 271,294 | 30.39 | 340,553 | 42.92 | check | Federation of the Greens | 23,150 | 3.08 | 1 |
| Nando dalla Chiesa | 271,294 | 30.39 | 340,553 | 42.92 | check | List for Milan | 10,683 | 1.42 | – |
| Nando dalla Chiesa | 271,294 | 30.39 | 340,553 | 42.92 | check | Total | 212,316 | 28.25 | 12 |
| Piero Bassetti | 97,095 | 10.88 | – | – | check | Christian Democracy | 70,881 | 9.43 | 4 |
| Piero Bassetti | 97,095 | 10.88 | – | – | check | With Women to Rebuild Milan | 5,145 | 0.68 | – |
| Piero Bassetti | 97,095 | 10.88 | – | – | check | Italian Socialist Democratic Party | 2,790 | 0.37 | – |
| Piero Bassetti | 97,095 | 10.88 | – | – | check | Federalism | 2,311 | 0.31 | – |
| Piero Bassetti | 97,095 | 10.88 | – | – | check | Total | 81,127 | 10.79 | 4 |
| Adriano Teso | 60,121 | 6.74 | – | – | check | Pact with Milan | 51,763 | 6.89 | 2 |
| Giampiero Borghini | 54,856 | 6.15 | – | – | check | Trust in Milan | 28,044 | 3.73 | 1 |
| Giampiero Borghini | 54,856 | 6.15 | – | – | check | Socialists and Reformists for Milan | 12,185 | 1.62 | – |
| Giampiero Borghini | 54,856 | 6.15 | – | – | check | Total | 40,229 | 5.35 | 1 |
| Riccardo De Corato | 25,899 | 2.90 | – | – | check | Italian Social Movement | 25,205 | 3.35 | – |
| Pier Gianni Prosperini | 10,012 | 1.12 | – | – | – | Lombard Alpine League | 8,677 | 1.15 | – |
| Angela Bossi | 8,157 | 0.91 | – | – | – | Lombard Alliance Autonomy | 7,855 | 1.05 | – |
| Tiziana Maiolo | 7,485 | 0.84 | – | – | – | Justice Ecology Freedom | 6,214 | 0.83 | – |
| Arman Armand | 4,586 | 0.51 | – | – | – | Pensioners' League | 4,536 | 0.60 | – |
| Claudio Stroppa | 3,926 | 0.44 | – | – | – | Stroppa List | 3,845 | 0.51 | – |
| Carlo Fatuzzo | 2,616 | 0.29 | – | – | – | Pensioners' Party | 2,719 | 0.36 | – |
| Total | 892,584 | 100.00 | 793,421 | 100.00 | 5 | | 751,608 | 100.00 | 55 |
| Eligible voters | 1,195,257 | 100.00 | 1,195,257 | 100.00 | | | | | |
| Did not vote | 261,197 | 21.85 | 367,317 | 30.73 | | | | | |
| Voted | 934,060 | 78.15 | 827,940 | 69.27 | | | | | |
| Blank or invalid ballots | 54,718 | 1.7 | 51,484 | 1.6 | | | | | |
| Total valid votes | 879,342 | 98.3 | 776,456 | 98.4 | | | | | |
Source: Ministry of the Interior

Popular vote
| LN | 40.9% |
| PRC | 11.4% |
| DC | 9.4% |
| PDS | 8.8% |
| PS | 6.9% |
| S&R | 5.3% |
| LR | 3.6% |
| MSI | 3.3% |
| FdV | 3.1% |

Council Seats
| LN | 60.0% |
| PRC | 10.0% |
| DC | 8.3% |
| PDS | 8.3% |
| PS | 5.0% |
| S&R | 3.3% |
| LR | 1.7% |
| MSI | 1.7% |
| FdV | 1.7% |

Popular vote (coalition)
| LN | 40.9% |
| Progressives | 28.2% |
| Centre | 10.8% |
| Others | 15.4% |

Council seats (coalition)
| LN | 60.0% |
| Progressives | 21.7% |
| Centre | 8.3% |
| Others | 10.0% |

== Results by zona ==
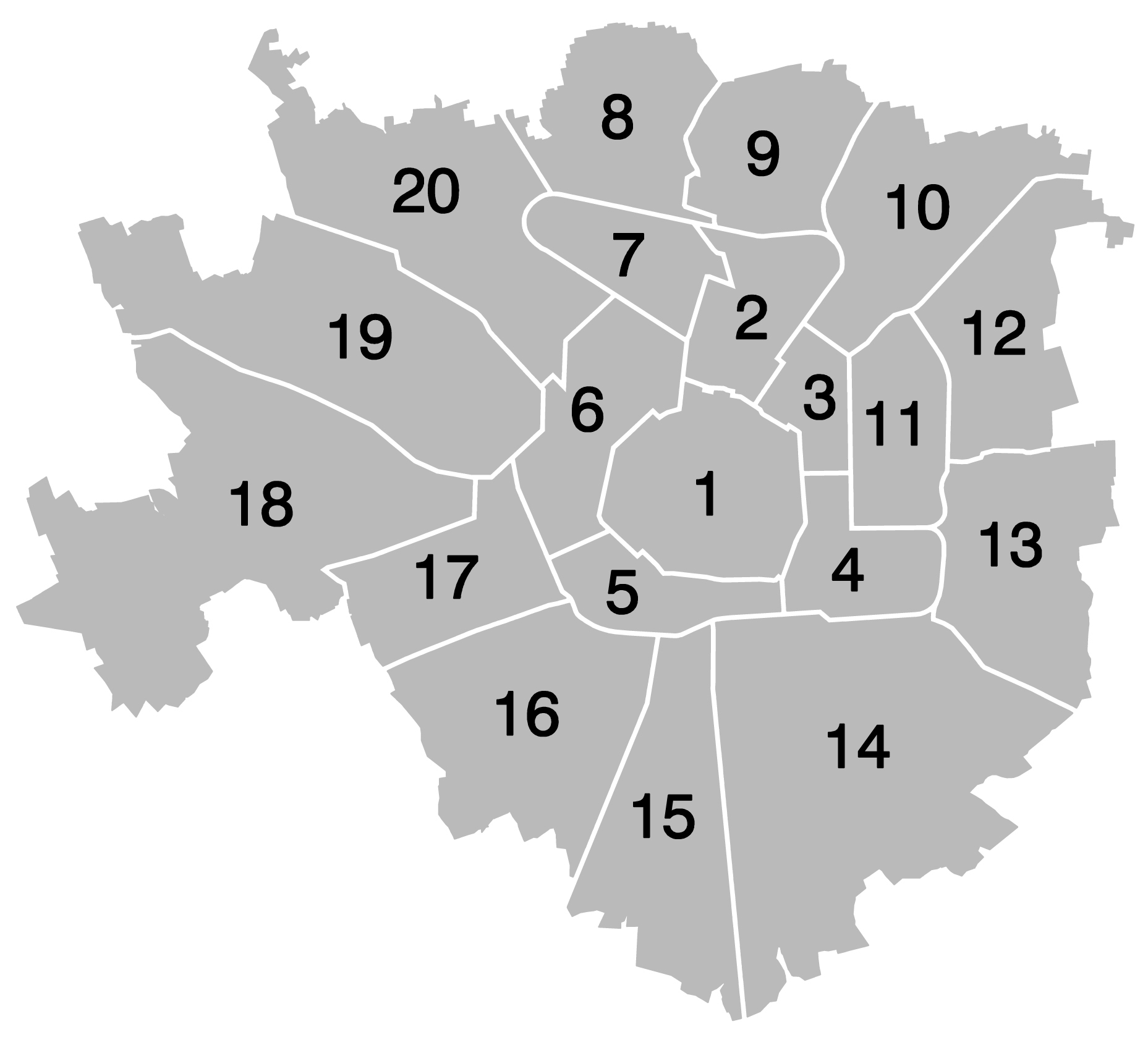

=== Mayoral votes ===
==== Second round ====
Table below shows the results of the votes for mayoral candidates on the second round (20 June 1993) in each zona:

| Zona | Marco Formentini | Nando Dalla Chiesa | Turnout |
|---|---|---|---|
| 1 | 30,706 (64.6%) | 16,808 (35.4%) | 64.4% |
| 2 | 24,953 (59.3%) | 17,161 (40.7%) | 69.0% |
| 3 | 18,454 (61.4%) | 11,587 (38.6%) | 66.7% |
| 4 | 23,708 (58.9%) | 16,573 (41.1%) | 67.8% |
| 5 | 20,493 (56.9%) | 15,527 (43.1%) | 68.4% |
| 6 | 39,426 (63.9%) | 22,309 (36.1%) | 69.6% |
| 7 | 9,943 (54.5%) | 8,302 (45.5%) | 70.0% |
| 8 | 15,341 (54.9%) | 12,602 (45.1%) | 70.4% |
| 9 | 15,435 (52.0%) | 14,234 (48.0%) | 71.5% |
| 10 | 29,741 (54.1%) | 25,243 (45.9%) | 69.2% |

| Zona | Marco Formentini | Nando Dalla Chiesa | Turnout |
|---|---|---|---|
| 11 | 36,194 (61.1%) | 23,080 (38.9%) | 69.0% |
| 12 | 10,103 (56.2%) | 7,884 (43.8%) | 71.9% |
| 13 | 8,325 (54.1%) | 7,068 (45.9%) | 70.2% |
| 14 | 24,670 (56.8%) | 18,763 (43.2%) | 70.5% |
| 15 | 16,892 (52.3%) | 15,384 (47.7%) | 71.0% |
| 16 | 17,300 (51.4%) | 16,387 (48.6%) | 72.3% |
| 17 | 27,724 (58.0%) | 20,076 (42.0%) | 68.6% |
| 18 | 26,061 (50.6%) | 25,440 (49.4%) | 70.7% |
| 19 | 32,047 (55.8%) | 25,436 (44.2%) | 70.9% |
| 20 | 25,216 (54.7%) | 20,844 (45.3%) | 67.8% |
