= 2011 Milan municipal election =

- 15–16 May 2011 (first round); 29–30 May 2011 (second round)
- Turnout: 67.6% ▲0.1 pp (first round); 67.4% ▼0.2 pp (second round)
- Mayoral election
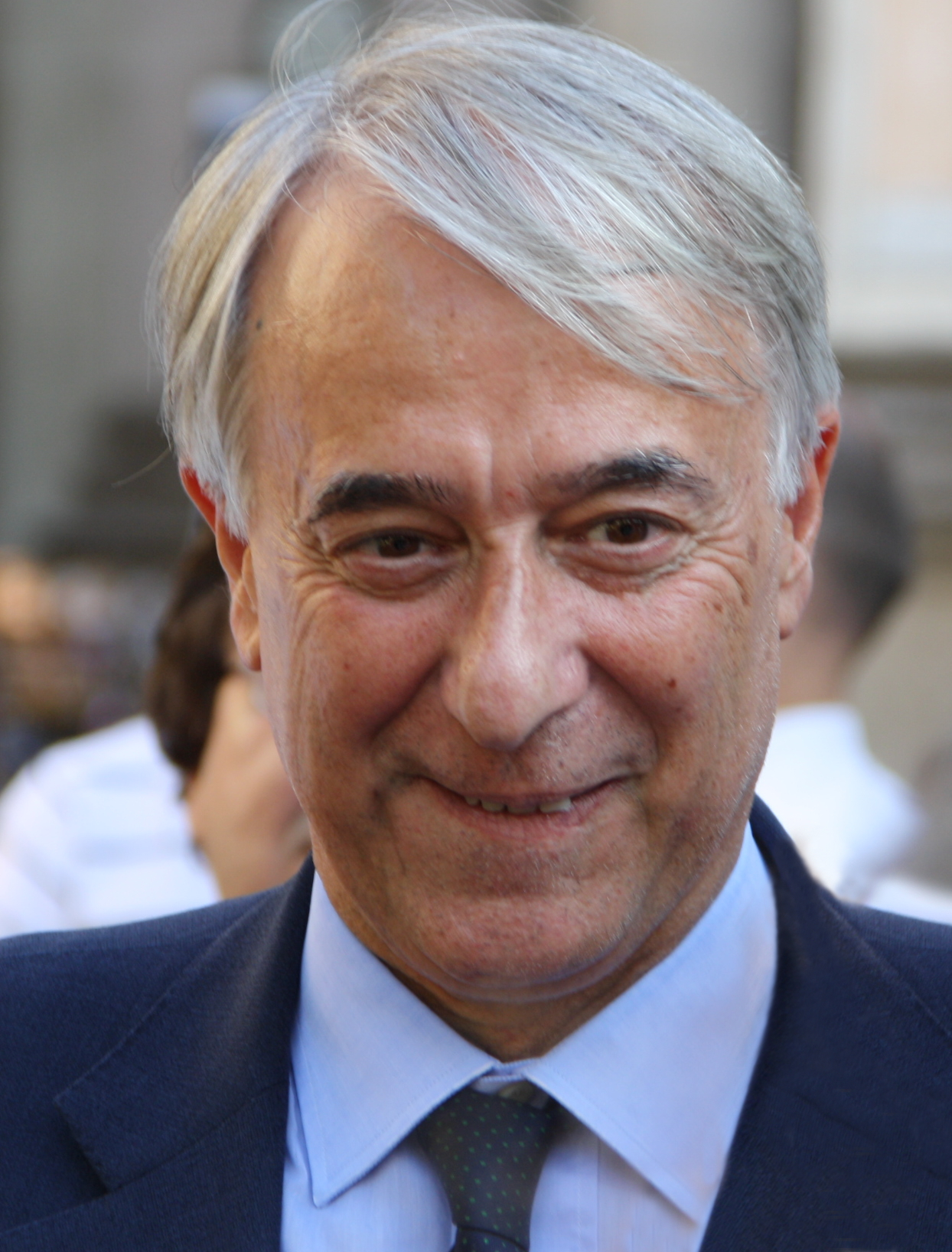

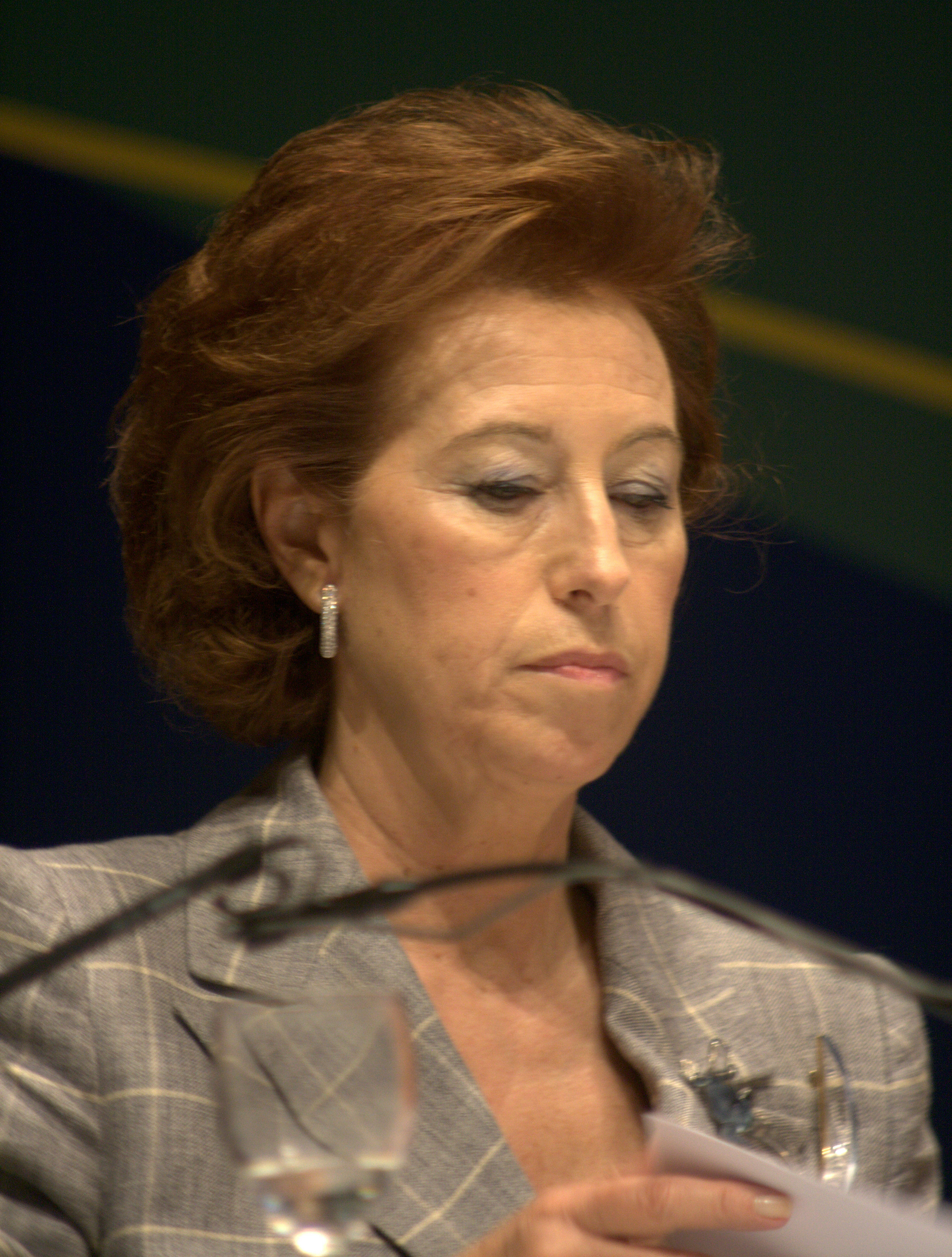
Candidate	Giuliano Pisapia	Letizia Moratti
Party	Independent	People of Freedom
Alliance	Centre-left	Centre-right
1st Round vote	315,862	273,401
Percentage	48.1%	41.6%
2nd Round vote	365,657	297,874
Percentage	55.1%	44.9%
Mayor before election
Letizia Moratti
PdL
Elected mayor
Giuliano Pisapia
Independent
- City Council election
- All 48 seats in City Council; 25 seats needed for a majority
Party	Leader	Vote %	Seats	+/–
Centre-left	Giuliano Pisapia	47.26	29	+6
Centre-right	Letizia Moratti	43.28	17	−19
New Pole	Manfredi Palmeri	4.59	1	+1
M5S	Mattia Calise	3.43	1	+1
This lists parties that won seats. See the complete results below.

Municipal elections were held in Milan on 15–16 and 29–30 May 2011 to elect the Mayor and the 48 members of the City Council, as well as the nine presidents and 359 councillors of the nine administrative zones in which the municipality is divided.

The incumbent Mayor of Milan Letizia Moratti was defeated by the left-wing lawyer Giuliano Pisapia, ending 18 years of right-wing rule in the city government.

As a result of the election, Pisapia was elected on the second round becoming the first leftist mayor of Milan after nearly 20 years. The centre-left coalition gained control of 29 seats in the City Council.

== Background ==
=== Centre-left primary election ===
In June 2010, Pisapia was the first to submit his own nomination as the Mayor of Milan, for the elections that would take place the following year. A number of intellectuals and notable people from the cultural and political elite of Milan immediately expressed their support to Pisapia.

On 14 November 2010 he ran for the open primary election of the centre-left coalition led by the Democratic Party, with the support of Nichi Vendola's Left Ecology Freedom, and unexpectedly won (receiving 45% preferences) despite not being an actual member of the PD:

Candidate	Supported by	Votes (%)
Giuliano Pisapia	SEL, FdS	45.36%
Stefano Boeri	PD	40.16%
Valerio Onida	none	13.41%
Michele Sacerdoti	none	1.07%
Total		100.00

Total voters: 67,499

=== Campaign ===
At the beginning of the campaign, incumbent Mayor Letizia Moratti was thought to be largely advantaged, especially as Milan is traditionally a right-wing stronghold, the homeland of Silvio Berlusconi's party (to which Moratti belongs), as well as a symbol of the alliance between Berlusconi and Umberto Bossi's Lega Nord, a party that promotes a greater independence of Northern Italy. Both Bossi and Berlusconi repeatedly declared that the left wing had no chance to win the elections in Milan, and Berlusconi himself actively contributed in the campaign, possibly to reaffirm his appeal to the Italian people leveraging on the results of what was supposed to be an easy match. Berlusconi warned that if Moratti was defeated, Milan would become a "Gypsytown" and an "Islamic city".

As Berlusconi had recently been involved in a number of controversial matters, including the so-called Ruby Gate, many observers described the elections in Milan as a poll that would assess the popular support of Berlusconi's politics. This attracted much attention to this particular election (one of many administrative elections held in the same days in several locations in Italy).

== Voting system ==
The semipresidential voting system is used for all mayoral elections in Italy of cities with a population higher than 15,000 for the fifth time. Under this system voters express a direct choice for the mayor or an indirect choice voting for the party of the candidate's coalition. If no candidate receives at least 50% of votes, the top two candidates go to a second round after two weeks. This gives a result whereby the winning candidate may be able to claim majority support.

For zones the voting system is the same, not referred to the mayor but to the president of the zone.

The election of the City Council is based on a direct choice for the candidate with a preference vote: the candidate with the majority of the preferences is elected. The number of the seats for each losing party is determined proportionally.

== Parties and candidates ==
This is a list of the major parties (and their respective leaders) which participated in the election.

Political party or alliance	Constituent lists	Candidate
Centre-left coalition	Democratic Party	Giuliano Pisapia
Centre-left coalition	Left Ecology Freedom	Giuliano Pisapia
Centre-left coalition	Italy of Values	Giuliano Pisapia
Centre-left coalition	Federation of the Left	Giuliano Pisapia
Centre-left coalition	Bonino-Pannella List	Giuliano Pisapia
Centre-left coalition	Federation of the Greens	Giuliano Pisapia
Five Star Movement		Mattia Calise
New Pole for Italy	New Pole for Milan (incl. FLI, API and PLI)	Manfredi Palmeri
New Pole for Italy	Union of the Centre	Manfredi Palmeri
Centre-right coalition	The People of Freedom	Letizia Moratti
Centre-right coalition	Northern League	Letizia Moratti
Centre-right coalition	The Right	Letizia Moratti
Centre-right coalition	I Love Italy	Letizia Moratti
Centre-right coalition	The Populars of Italy Tomorrow	Letizia Moratti
Centre-right coalition	Alliance of the Centre	Letizia Moratti

== Results ==
In the first round of elections, on 15–16 May 2011, Pisapia got 48% of the votes and Moratti 41%. As none of them exceeded 50%, a second face-to-face round was scheduled for 29–30 May. This first success of Pisapia was one of a number of successes of the left wing in several other cities and provinces. With the campaign reaching ever harsher tones than before, Pisapia finally won on 30 May, with 55% of the votes. Internet and social networks played a relevant role in the election of Pisapia.

The candidate of Beppe Grillo's party Five Star Movement, Mattia Calise, who was only 20 years old, obtained nearly 3.5% of the votes.

Summary of the 2011 Milan City Council and Mayoral election results
Candidates	1st round		2nd round		Leader's seat	Parties	Votes	%	Seats
Candidates	Votes	%	Votes	%	Leader's seat	Parties	Votes	%	Seats
Giuliano Pisapia	315,862	48.05	365,657	55.11	–	Democratic Party	170,551	28.64	20
Giuliano Pisapia	315,862	48.05	365,657	55.11	–	Left Ecology Freedom	28,016	4.70	3
Giuliano Pisapia	315,862	48.05	365,657	55.11	–	Pisapia List – Civic Milan	22,995	3.86	2
Giuliano Pisapia	315,862	48.05	365,657	55.11	–	Federation of the Left	18,467	3.10	2
Giuliano Pisapia	315,862	48.05	365,657	55.11	–	Italy of Values	15,145	2.54	1
Giuliano Pisapia	315,862	48.05	365,657	55.11	–	Bonino-Pannella List	10,215	1.72	1
Giuliano Pisapia	315,862	48.05	365,657	55.11	–	Ecologist Greens	8,165	1.37	–
Giuliano Pisapia	315,862	48.05	365,657	55.11	–	Milly Moratti List for Pisapia	7,940	1.33	–
Giuliano Pisapia	315,862	48.05	365,657	55.11	–	Total	281,494	47.26	29
Letizia Moratti	273,401	41.59	297,874	44.89	check	The People of Freedom	171,222	28.75	11
Letizia Moratti	273,401	41.59	297,874	44.89	check	Northern League	57,403	9.64	4
Letizia Moratti	273,401	41.59	297,874	44.89	check	Milan in the Center	14,532	2.44	1
Letizia Moratti	273,401	41.59	297,874	44.89	check	I Love Italy	3,050	0.51	–
Letizia Moratti	273,401	41.59	297,874	44.89	check	Better Milan Project	3,022	0.51	–
Letizia Moratti	273,401	41.59	297,874	44.89	check	Pensions and Work	1,840	0.31	–
Letizia Moratti	273,401	41.59	297,874	44.89	check	The Right	1,721	0.29	–
Letizia Moratti	273,401	41.59	297,874	44.89	check	Italian Union	1,632	0.27	–
Letizia Moratti	273,401	41.59	297,874	44.89	check	Young People for the Expo	1,208	0.20	–
Letizia Moratti	273,401	41.59	297,874	44.89	check	New Italian Socialist Party	1,029	0.17	–
Letizia Moratti	273,401	41.59	297,874	44.89	check	The Populars of Italy Tomorrow	713	0.12	–
Letizia Moratti	273,401	41.59	297,874	44.89	check	Alliance of the Centre	405	0.07	–
Letizia Moratti	273,401	41.59	297,874	44.89	check	Total	257,777	43.28	16
Manfredi Palmeri	36,471	5.55	–	–	check	New Pole for Milan	16,015	2.69	–
Manfredi Palmeri	36,471	5.55	–	–	check	Union of the Centre	11,313	1.90	–
Manfredi Palmeri	36,471	5.55	–	–	check	Total	27,328	4.59	–
Mattia Calise	21,228	3.23	–	–	check	Five Star Movement	20,438	3.43	–
Giancarlo Pagliarini	4,229	0.64	–	–	–	Padanian League Lombardy	3,159	0.53	–
Marco Mantovani	2,366	0.36	–	–	–	New Force	2,088	0.35	–
Carla De Albertis	1,804	0.27	–	–	–	Your Milan	1,447	0.24	–
Elisabetta Fatuzzo	1,613	0.25	–	–	–	Pensioners' Party	1,461	0.25	–
Fabrizio Montuori	405	0.06	–	–	–	Workers' Communist Party	393	0.07	–
Total	657,379	100.00	663,531	100.00	3		595,585	100.00	45
Eligible voters	996,400	100.0	996,400	100.0					
Did not vote	322,875	32.4	324,980	32.6					
Voted	673,525	67.6	671,420	67.4					
Blank or invalid ballots	15,838	2.4	7,889	1.2					
Total valid votes	657,687	97.6	663,531	98.8					
Source: Ministry of the Interior

According to each part's popular vote, the People of Freedom party (PdL) won a narrow victory over the center-left Democratic Party (PD), which however won the majority in the City Council.

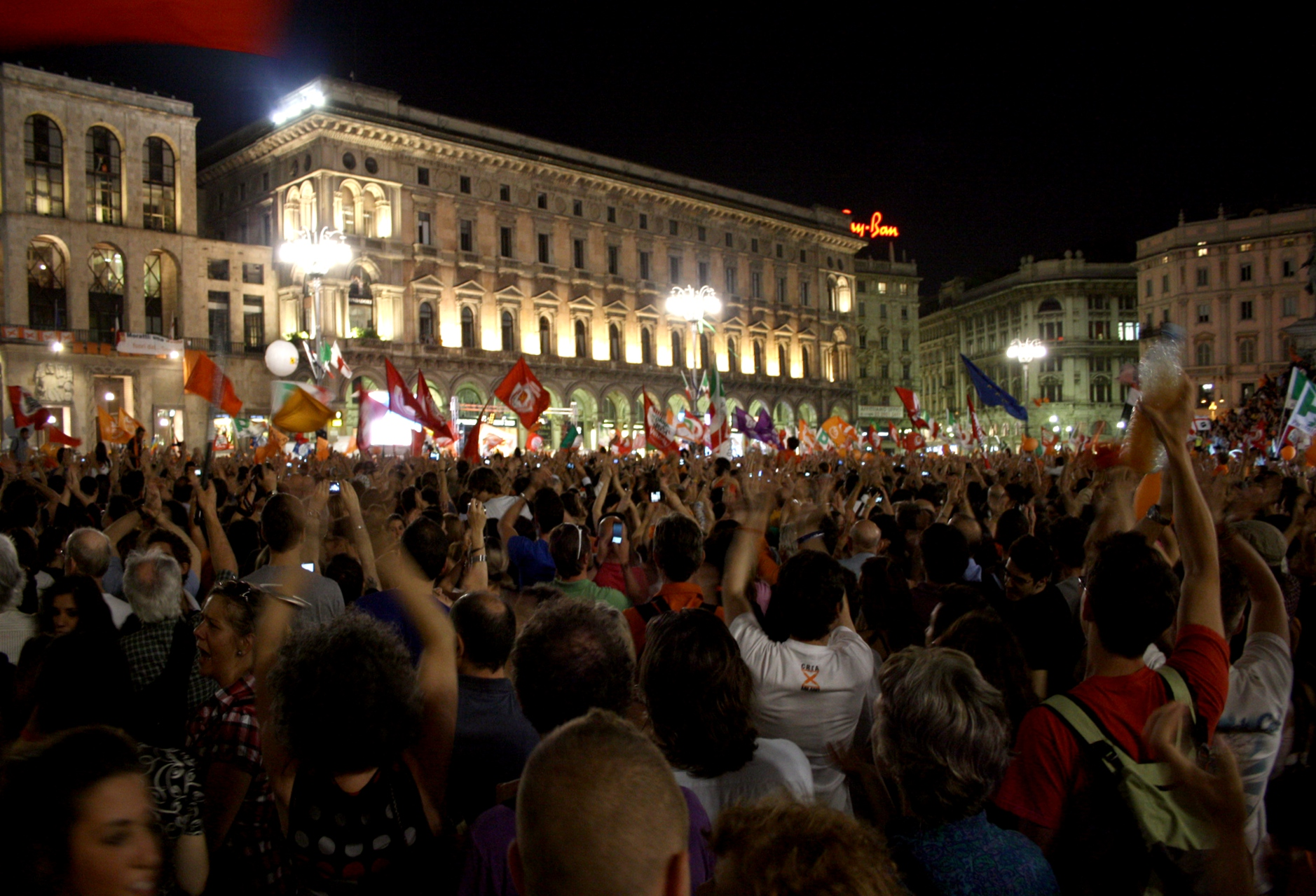
Piazza del Duomo. Supporters of Pisapia celebrating his election on 30 May 2011.

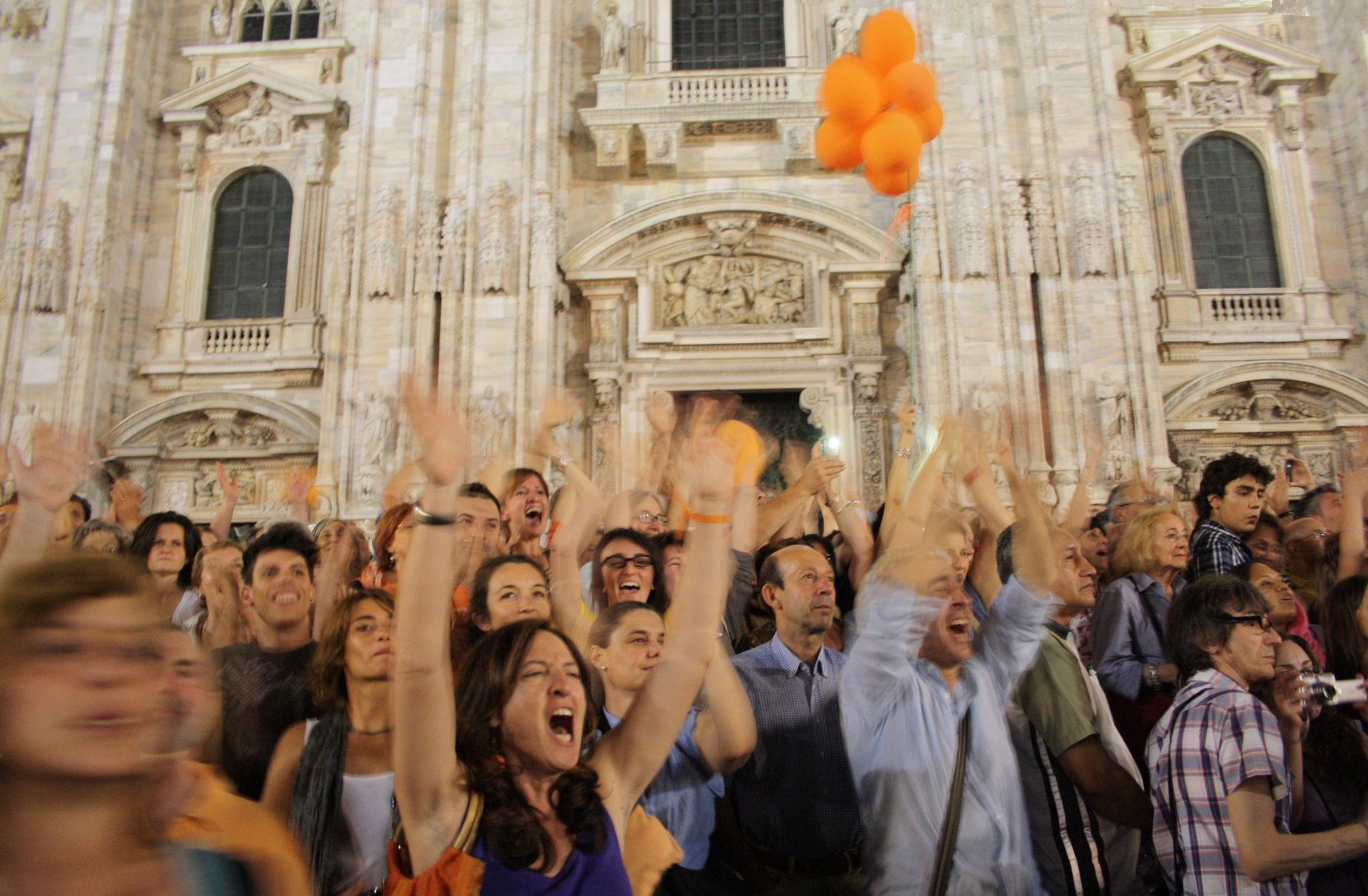
Supporters of Pisapia celebrating his election in front of the Duomo.

Popular vote
PdL	28.75%
PD	28.64%
LN	9.64%
SEL	4.70%
M5S	3.43%
FDS	3.10%

Council Seats
PD	41.6%
PdL	22.9%
LN	8.3%
SEL	6.2%
FDS	4.2%
M5S	2.1%

Popular vote (coalition)
Centre-left	47.26%
Centre-right	43.28%
Centre	4.59%
M5S	3.43%

Council seats (coalition)
Centre-left	62.5%
Centre-right	33.3%
Centre	2.0%
M5S	2.0%

== Results by zona ==
The 9 zones

After the 2006 election, 8 zone were governed by the centre-right and only one by the centre-left. Then all were gained by the centre-left coalition.

Table below shows the results for each zona with the percentage for each candidate and president elected:

Zona	Centre-left		Centre-right		Centre		Others		Elected President	Party
Zona	votes	%	votes	%	votes	%	votes	%	Elected President	Party
1	23,596	47.3	22,377	44.9	3,597	7.2	323	0.6	Fabio Luigi Arrigoni	PD
2	29,910	45.8	28,372	43.5	3,797	5.8	3,204	4.9	Mario Villa	PD
3	36,423	49.5	29,002	39.4	4,283	5.8	3,875	5.3	Renato Sacristiani	PRC
4	36,752	48.8	30,668	40.8	3,895	5.2	3,938	5.2	Loredana Bigatti	PD
5	28,467	48.2	23,669	40.1	3,482	5.9	3,413	5.8	Aldo Ugliano	PD
6	35,852	49.1	29,111	39.8	4,088	5.6	4,016	5.5	Gabriele Rabaiotti	PD
7	38,140	45.6	35,392	42.4	5,652	6.8	4,383	5.2	Fabrizio Tellini	IdV
8	42,359	48.1	36,012	40.9	5,117	5.8	4,600	5.2	Simone Zambelli	SEL
9	40,064	49.3	32,786	40.3	3,978	4.9	4,450	5.5	Beatrice Uguccioni	PD

Source: Municipality of Milan - Electoral Service

Table below shows the seats for each coalition in every zona 's Council:

Zona	Centre-left	Centre-right	Centre	Others	Total
1	19	10	2	–	31
2	25	13	2	1	41
3	25	13	2	1	41
4	25	13	2	1	41
5	25	12	2	2	41
6	25	13	2	1	41
7	25	12	2	2	41
8	25	13	2	1	41
9	25	13	1	2	41
Total	219	112	17	11	359

Source: Municipality of Milan - Electoral Service

=== Mayoral votes ===
==== Second round ====
Table below shows the results of the votes for mayoral candidates on the second round (29–30 May 2011) in each zona:

Zona	Giuliano Pisapia	Letizia Moratti	Turnout
1	26,571 (51.2%)	25,323 (48.8%)	65.5%
2	35,462 (53.4%)	30,905 (46.6%)	67.7%
3	42,316 (56.3%)	32,783 (43.7%)	69.4%
4	42,685 (55.8%)	33,846 (44.2%)	67.3%
5	33,990 (56.6%)	26,023 (43.4%)	66.6%
6	42,608 (56.4%)	32,896 (43.6%)	66.7%
7	46,329 (54.1%)	39,228 (45.9%)	67.8%
8	48,989 (54.7%)	40,603 (45.3%)	67.0%
9	46,767 (56.4%)	36,207 (43.6%)	67.8%
