= Bruno Ferrante =

Italian prefect

Bruno Ferrante (born 26 April 1947 in Lecce) was Milan prefect from 8 June 2000 to November 2005. He ran in 2006 as a mayoral candidate in Milan for the centre-left coalition The Union, after having won a primary election with around 67.85% of votes. The other contender for the nomination was Dario Fo.

Graduated in jurisprudence at University of Pisa, he is married with two children.

== Biography ==
After earning a law degree, he became a civil servant at the Ministry of the Interior by winning a competitive exam in 1973 and began working at the Pavia Prefecture. He was later transferred to the Milan Prefecture, where he also served as chief of staff.

Between 1992 and 1993, he served as special commissioner for the municipality of Monza, and in the summer of 1993, as deputy special commissioner for the municipality of Milan.

In October 1993, he was appointed prefect and assigned the role of deputy chief of staff at the Ministry of the Interior (Italy). In the words of Francesco Cossiga, who was minister at the time, “Bruno Ferrante was a young colleague of mine when I was Minister of the Interior, and anyone who has worked with me can do anything except become Pope.”

Since September 1, 1994, he has served as deputy chief of police in charge of coordination and planning. On October 6, 1994, he was appointed first-class prefect by the government. From June 1996 to June 2000, he served as chief of staff at the Ministry of the Interior (Italy) under Ministers Giorgio Napolitano, Rosa Russo Iervolino, and Enzo Bianco.

From June 8, 2000, to November 3, 2005, he served as prefect of Milan. During the first months of his term, he had to deal with bomb threats claimed by the New Red Brigades at the Duomo and in Sant’Ambrogio, the plane crashes at Linate and the Pirellone, the issue of the Islamic school on Via Quaranta, the simultaneous strike by ATM and taxi drivers, and the crisis at La Scala.

Ferrante resigned as prefect to run in the Union’s primary election for mayor of Milan on January 29, 2006, with the support of the DS, Margherita, and SDI. After winning the primary with 67.75% of the vote, defeating Nobel Prize winner Dario Fo, he nevertheless lost the mayoral election, garnering 47% of the vote against Letizia Moratti’s 52%. While Bruno Ferrante spent 694,000 euros on his election campaign, Letizia Moratti received 6,335,000 euros in funding from her husband, Gianmarco.

In January 2007 , the Council of Ministers appointed him High Commissioner for the Prevention and Combating of Corruption and Other Forms of Illegal Activity in Public Administration; upon receiving this appointment, Ferrante resigned from his position as a Milan city council member.

On July 16 of that same year, he also resigned from the position he had assumed six months earlier(he was succeeded by Achille Serra (politician), former prefect of Rome) to accept the position of president of Fibe and Fibe Campania, subsidiaries of the Impregilo Group operating in the waste management sector. The company announced that Ferrante would bring “clarity and professionalism to the management of the waste problem in Campania,” but the waste crisis in Campania continued to worsen.

In July 2012, he succeeded Nicola Riva as president of Ilva, serving as an institutional guarantor in an effort to halt the seizure of the plant. Ferrante stated: "This is the first time Ilva has been led by someone outside the family." Following the seizure of Ilva, the Apulian judiciary removed Ferrante from his position as judicial administrator of the plants, until his reinstatement was ordered by the Review Court.
