= 2001 Milan municipal election =

- 13 May 2001
- Turnout: 82.3% ▲10.4 pp
- Mayoral election
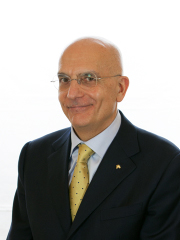

Candidate	Gabriele Albertini	Sandro Antoniazzi
Party	Forza Italia	Independent
Alliance	Centre-right	Centre-left
Popular vote	499,020	264,217
Percentage	57.5%	30.5%
Mayor before election
Gabriele Albertini
FI
Elected mayor
Gabriele Albertini
FI
- City Council election
- All 60 seats in City Council; 31 seats needed for a majority
Party	Leader	Vote %	Seats	+/–
Centre-right	Gabriele Albertini	54.17	36	0
Centre-left	Sandro Antoniazzi	33.39	19	+7
IdV	Antonio Di Pietro	5.62	3	+3
FdV	Milly Moratti	3.81	2	+1
This lists parties that won seats. See the complete results below.

Municipal elections were held in Milan on 13 May 2001 to elect the Mayor of Milan and the 60 members of the City Council.

The incumbent Mayor Gabriele Albertini easily won a second term in office, defeating the centre-left candidate and former trade unionist Sandro Carlo Antoniazzi.

The municipal elections occurred on the same day of the national general election which was heavily won by Silvio Berlusconi's House of Freedoms, a circumstance that largely influenced also the local vote. In this election, the Mayor was elected for the first time for a five years term, in accordance to a new local administration Law approved in 2000.

== Background ==
During his first 4-years term as Mayor, Gabriele Albertini usually referred himself as a "condominium administrator", underlining his soft attitude to the government of the city: Albertini's popularity was extremely high since his administration seemed more like the one of a manager heading an enterprise. Describing himself as a man of the civil society, he managed to identify and subdivide municipal affairs with the politically and economically closest interests, choosing trusted men for the top management jobs of large municipal companies and banks and creating a real network of alliances with the social and economical powers of the city, such as businessmen, stylists and bankers.

On the other side, moreover weakened by the national government's extreme unpopularity, the centre-left coalition was unable to find a way to fit into this system of power.

=== Campaign ===
As Albertini decided to conduct a low profile campaign, benefiting from Berlusconi's national campaign (Berlusconi himself was candidate in the constituency of Milan City Centre for the Chamber of Deputies), the semi-unknown centre-left candidate Sandro Antoniazzi struggled to emerge as a competitive contender to the office of Mayor. Moreover the centre-left coalition was deeply divided, with the Federation of the Greens (FdV) and Italy of Values (IdV) parties presenting their own mayoral candidates (respectively the environmentalist activist Milly Moratti and the notorious former magistrate Antonio Di Pietro).

On the contrary, the centre-right coalition was unified thanks to a new alliance between Berlusconi and the Lega Nord leader Umberto Bossi, even if Bossi repeatedly attacked the incumbent Mayor describing him as a "man of power" while his party was at the side of the people.

== Voting system ==
The semipresidential voting system was the one used for all mayoral elections in Italy of cities with a population higher than 15,000 for the third time. Under this system voters express a direct choice for the Mayor or an indirect choice voting for the party of the candidate's coalition. If no candidate receives at least 50% of votes, the top two candidates go to a second round after two weeks. This gives a result whereby the winning candidate may be able to claim majority support.

The election of the City Council is based on a direct choice for the candidate with a preference vote: the candidate with the majority of the preferences is elected. The number of the seats for each losing party is determined proportionally.

== Parties and candidates ==
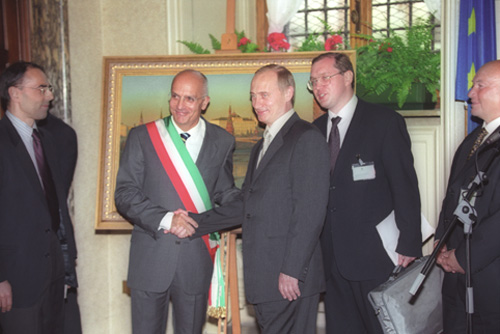
Gabriele Albertini welcoming Russian President Vladimir Putin during his trip to Milan on 6 June 2000

This is a list of the major parties (and their respective leaders) which participated in the election.

Political party or alliance	Constituent lists	Candidate
Federation of the Greens		Milly Moratti
Centre-left coalition (The Olive Tree)	Democrats of the Left	Sandro Antoniazzi
Centre-left coalition (The Olive Tree)	The Daisy	Sandro Antoniazzi
Centre-left coalition (The Olive Tree)	Communist Refoundation Party	Sandro Antoniazzi
Centre-left coalition (The Olive Tree)	Party of Italian Communists	Sandro Antoniazzi
Centre-left coalition (The Olive Tree)	Italian Democratic Socialists	Sandro Antoniazzi
Italy of Values		Antonio Di Pietro
Centre-right coalition (House of Freedoms)	Forza Italia	Gabriele Albertini
Centre-right coalition (House of Freedoms)	National Alliance	Gabriele Albertini
Centre-right coalition (House of Freedoms)	Northern League	Gabriele Albertini
Centre-right coalition (House of Freedoms)	Christian Democratic Centre	Gabriele Albertini

== Results ==
Summary of the 2001 Milan City Council and Mayoral election results
Candidates	Votes	%	Leader's seat	Parties	Votes	%	Seats
Gabriele Albertini	499,020	57.54	–	Forza Italia	245,052	37.47	25
Gabriele Albertini	499,020	57.54	–	National Alliance	66,389	10.15	7
Gabriele Albertini	499,020	57.54	–	Northern League	28,623	4.38	3
Gabriele Albertini	499,020	57.54	–	Christian Democratic Centre – United Christian Democrats	14,184	2.17	1
Gabriele Albertini	499,020	57.54	–	Total	354,248	54.17	36
Sandro Antoniazzi	264,217	30.47	check	Democrats of the Left	91,336	13.97	8
Sandro Antoniazzi	264,217	30.47	check	Democracy is Freedom – The Daisy	66,337	10.14	6
Sandro Antoniazzi	264,217	30.47	check	Communist Refoundation Party	39,663	6.06	3
Sandro Antoniazzi	264,217	30.47	check	Miracle in Milan	11,513	1.76	1
Sandro Antoniazzi	264,217	30.47	check	Party of Italian Communists	5,990	0.92	–
Sandro Antoniazzi	264,217	30.47	check	Italian Democratic Socialists	3,550	0.54	–
Sandro Antoniazzi	264,217	30.47	check	Total	218,389	33.39	18
Antonio Di Pietro	45,667	5.27	check	Italy of Values	36,746	5.62	2
Milly Moratti	36,189	4.17	check	Federation of the Greens	17,570	2.69	1
Milly Moratti	36,189	4.17	check	Moratti List	7,333	1.12	–
Milly Moratti	36,189	4.17	check	Total	24,903	3.81	1
Arturo Testa	6,749	0.78	–	Pensioners' Party	6,074	0.93	–
Camilla Occhionorelli	3,965	0.46	–	European Democracy	3,434	0.53	–
Attilio Carelli	3,832	0.44	–	Tricolour Flame	3,416	0.52	–
Stefano Carluccio	3,108	0.36	–	Liberal Socialists	2,898	0.44	–
Giorgio Schultze	2,586	0.30	–	Humanist Party	2,227	0.34	–
Sergio Gozzoli	1,878	0.22	–	New Force	1,655	0.25	–
Total	867,211	100.00	3		653,990	100.00	57
Eligible voters	1,091,046	100.00					
Did not vote	193,191	17.71					
Voted	897,855	82.29					
Blank or invalid ballots	30,644	3.4					
Total valid votes	867,211	96.6					
Source: Ministry of the Interior
