= Giulio Gallera =

Italian politician

Giulio Gallera (born 28 April 1969 in Milan) is an Italian politician.

== Biography ==
Born in Milan, he graduated in law at the University of Milan in 1995, passing the bar exam in 1998.

He started his political career in the youth group of the Italian Liberal Party, and in 1994 he was among the founders of Forza Italia. After serving as city councilor in Milan, he was elected to the Lombard Regional Council in 2012. He has been appointed Regional Minister for Health and Welfare since 2016, first by President of Lombardy Roberto Maroni and then by his successor Attilio Fontana in 2018. In 2021, after drawing criticism over Lombardy's response to the COVID-19 pandemic, he was replaced with Letizia Moratti. In May 2021 he became chairman of the Programme and Budget Commission.

In the February 2023 regional election, Gallera was not initially elected to the Regional Council. However, he took office on 15 March 2023, replacing fellow Forza Italia member Gianluca Comazzi, who had been appointed to the regional government.

On 19 April 2023, Gallera was elected chairman of the Special Committee on the National Recovery and Resilience Plan (PNRR), European Funds Monitoring and Regional Funding Programmes. The committee was responsible for overseeing the implementation of the PNRR in Lombardy, monitoring the allocation and use of European Union funds, and assessing the effectiveness of regional funding programmes. He chaired the committee until July 2026.

On 20 July 2026, Gallera was elected chairman of the newly established Special Committee on Occupational Health and Safety in Lombardy, receiving 64 votes. The committee focuses on workplace safety, the prevention of occupational accidents and the protection of workers' health, building on the work of the Regional Council's previous inquiry into workplace safety.
