= 2021 Milan municipal election =

Election in Milan

- 3–4 October 2021
- Turnout: 47.7% ▼6.9 pp
- Mayoral election
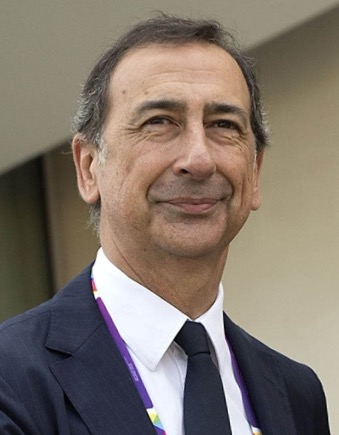

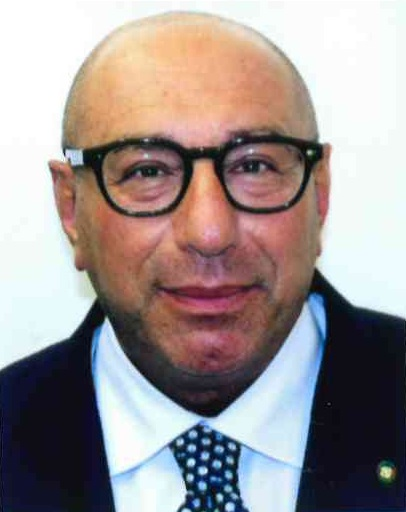
Candidate	Giuseppe Sala	Luca Bernardo
Party	Independent	Independent
Alliance	Centre-left	Centre-right
Votes	277,478	153,637
Percentage	57.7%	32.0%
Mayor before election
Giuseppe Sala
Independent
Elected mayor
Giuseppe Sala
Independent
- City Council election
- All 48 seats in City Council; 25 seats needed for a majority
Party	Leader	Vote %	Seats	+/–
Centre-left	Giuseppe Sala	56.96	31	+2
Centre-right	Luca Bernardo	32.78	17	+2
This lists parties that won seats. See the complete results below.

Municipal elections took place in Milan, Italy, on 3 and 4 October 2021 to elect the Mayor and the 48 members of the City Council, as well as the nine presidents and 270 councillors of the nine administrative zones (municipi) in which the municipality is divided, each one having one president and 30 councillors.

Local elections in Italy are usually scheduled between 15 April and 15 June, however on 4 March 2021 the Italian government decided to postpone them to the autumn following a new spike of cases in the coronavirus pandemic.

As a result, incumbent mayor Giuseppe Sala was re-elected for a second five-year term by a landslide.

== Electoral system ==
A two-round system is used for all mayoral elections in Italy, in the cities with a population higher than 15,000 inhabitants, for the seventh time. Under this system, voters express a direct choice for the mayor or an indirect choice voting for the party of the candidate's coalition. If no candidate receives 50% of votes during the first round, the top two candidates go to a second round after two weeks. The winning candidate obtains a majority bonus equal to 60% of seats.

The election of the City Council is based on a direct choice for the candidate with a maximum of two preferential votes, each for a different gender, belonging to the same party list: the candidate with the majority of the preferences is elected. The number of the seats for each losing party is determined proportionally, using D'Hondt seat allocation. Only coalitions with more than 3% of votes are eligible to get any seats.

== Background ==
=== Centre-left coalition ===
On 7 December 2020, the incumbent mayor Giuseppe Sala announced that he had chosen to run for re-election in 2021 for a second term in office. Sala announced that he would present his electoral program and the lists of his coalition before the end of January, ruling out a possible alliance with the Five Star Movement (M5S). Sala also sought a reconciliation with Green Europe after the rupture following the cutting of the trees in the Bassini Park to make way for a new department of chemistry for the Politecnico di Milano. Spokeswoman Elena Grandi initially announced an autonomous candidacy with its own candidate for mayor, but ultimately they had a meeting with the outgoing mayor to discuss their support for his candidacy.

On 12 March 2021 Sala joined the European Green Party.

== Parties and candidates ==
This is a partial list of the major parties (and their respective leaders) which participated in the election.

Political force or alliance	Constituent lists	Candidate
Centre-left coalition	Democratic Party	Giuseppe Sala
Centre-left coalition	Beppe Sala for Mayor (incl. Art.1, DemoS, VèP)	Giuseppe Sala
Centre-left coalition	United Milan – The Left for Sala (incl. SI, èViva)	Giuseppe Sala
Centre-left coalition	The Reformers – Let's work for Milan with Sala (incl. IV, A, +E, CD, PRI, ALI, others)	Giuseppe Sala
Centre-left coalition	Green Europe	Giuseppe Sala
Centre-left coalition	Healthy Milan	Giuseppe Sala
Centre-left coalition	Volt	Giuseppe Sala
Centre-left coalition	Radical Milan with Sala	Giuseppe Sala
Centre-right coalition	League	Luca Bernardo
Centre-right coalition	Brothers of Italy	Luca Bernardo
Centre-right coalition	Forza Italia	Luca Bernardo
Centre-right coalition	Luca Bernardo for Mayor	Luca Bernardo
Centre-right coalition	Popular Milan (incl. Rin., NcI)	Luca Bernardo
Centre-right coalition	European Liberal Party	Luca Bernardo
Five Star Movement		Layla Pavone
Mariani coalition	Milan in Common (incl. PRC, Pos, RS)	Gabriele Antonio Mariani
Mariani coalition	Civic EnvironmentaList	Gabriele Antonio Mariani
Goggi coalition	Socialists of Milan (incl. PSI, others)	Giorgio Goggi
Goggi coalition	Liberal Milan	Giorgio Goggi
Communist Party		Alessandro Pascale
Power to the People		Bianca Tedone
Gay Party		Mauro Festa
Milan Starts Here		Bryant Biavaschi
Paragone coalition	Paragone for Mayor (incl. Italexit, Vox Italy, PdF)	Gianluigi Paragone
Paragone coalition	Great North	Gianluigi Paragone
Workers' Communist Party		Natale Azzaretto
3V Movement		Teodosio De Bonis
Italian Communist Party		Marco Muggiani

Monica Romano, a municipal councillor of the Democratic Party, became the first trans woman elected to political office in Milan in 2021.

== Opinion polls ==
=== Candidates ===
==== First round ====
Date	Polling firm/ Client	Sample size	Sala	Bernardo	Pavone	Others	Undecided	Lead
4 October 2021	Election result	-	57.7	32.0	2.7	7.6	-	25.7
13–16 Sep 2021	SWG	1,200	51.0	38.0	4.0	7.0	17.0	13.0
13–15 Sep 2021	Winpoll	804	55.5	35.9	3.0	5.6	—N/a	20.0
12–15 Sep 2021	Noto	1,000	48.0	36.5	4.0	11.5	27.0	11.5
7–13 Sep 2021	Ipsos	1,000	49.5	34.9	6.4	9.2	25.0	14.6
10–12 Sep 2021	BiDiMedia	809	48.1	39.2	4.0	8.7	21.0	8.9
6–11 Sep 2021	Tecné	2,000	47.0	41.0	5.0	7.0	42.0	6.0
7–10 Sep 2021	Quorum	805	50.9	37.0	5.6	6.5	47.4	13.9
3–8 Sep 2021	Quorum	804	51.4	37.2	4.6	6.7	47.0	14.2
25–27 Aug 2021	BiDiMedia	811	47.1	39.8	5.1	8.0	28.0	7.3
15–27 Jul 2021	Winpoll	800	48.3	39.6	3.4	8.7	—N/a	8.7
17–26 Jul 2021	Ipsos	1,200	47.5	38.6	7.8	6.2	—N/a	8.9
16–19 Jul 2021	Tecnè	1,000	44.0	44.0	6.0	6.0	43.0	Tie
13–16 Jul 2021	Demopolis	4,220	45.5	42.5	5.0	6.0	—N/a	3.0
2–5 Jul 2021	Demetra	702	46.0	45.0	—N/a	9.0	—N/a	1.0
18–20 Jun 2021	Tecnè	800	44.0	45.0	7.0	4.0	45.0	1.0
14–20 Feb 2021	BiDiMedia	736	47.1	36.9	6.0	10.0	24.0	10.2

==== Second round ====
Sala vs. Bernardo

Date	Polling firm/ Client	Sample size	Sala	Bernardo	Undecided	Lead
13–16 Sep 2021	SWG	1,200	57.0	43.0	13.0	14.0
13–15 Sep 2021	Winpoll	804	63.7	36.3	22.0	27.4
7–13 Sep 2021	Ipsos	1,000	60.0	40.0	30.0	20.0
10–12 Sep 2021	BiDiMedia	809	56.5	43.5	24.0	13.0
3–8 Sep 2021	Quorum	804	64.2	35.8	—N/a	28.4
17–26 Jul 2021	Ipsos	1,200	56.1	43.9	—N/a	12.2

=== Parties ===
Date	Polling firm	Sample size	Centre-left					Centre-right				M5S		PRC		Others	Undecided	Lead
Date	Polling firm	Sample size	PD	+E–A	EV	Art.1-SI	Other	Lega	FI	FdI	Other	M5S	Other	PRC	Other	Others	Undecided	Lead
4 October 2021	Election result	-	33.9	4.0	5.1	1.6	12.4	10.7	7.1	9.8	5.2	2.8		1.0	0.6	5.9	-	21.5
13–16 Sep 2021	SWG	1,200	23.8	3.8	2.9	2.1	17.1	14.8	7.7	11.8	4.8	5.2		—N/a		6.0	16.0	9.0
13–15 Sep 2021	Winpoll	804	26.3	—N/a	2.8	—N/a	21.9	14.4	8.1	9.6	8.6	3.7		—N/a		4.6	—N/a	11.9
7–13 Sep 2021	Ipsos	1,000	23.5	2.5	1.4	2.4	17.6	13.1	7.1	13.1	4.0	8.5		—N/a		6.8	26.0	10.4
10–12 Sep 2021	BiDiMedia	809	24.6	5.9	1.4	2.6	11.3	15.4	6.5	15.6	4.1	4.1		2.2	1.0	5.0	41.0	9.0
3–8 Sep 2021	Quorum	804	27.6	22.6				14.1	7.9	11.3	3.6	3.4	1.1	—N/a		8.5	45.8	13.5
25–27 Aug 2021	BiDiMedia	811	24.6	5.4	1.4	2.9	10.6	16.6	6.7	14.2	4.1	5.6		2.0	1.0	4.5	—N/a	8.0
14–20 Feb 2021	BiDiMedia	736	20.0	5.6	2.6	2.0	15.2	14.8	10.2	9.8	3.6	6.4		4.1		5.7	24.0	5.2
5 June 2016	Election result	-	29.0	DNP	DNP	3.8	10.2	11.8	20.2	2.4	6.6	10.4		3.5		2.1	-	8.8

== Results ==
Incumbent mayor Beppe Sala, supported by a centre-left coalition, was re-elected in the first round with about 58% of the vote. His main opponent, centre-right candidate Luca Bernardo, got 31% of the votes. The voter turnout was 47.7%, almost 7 percentage points less than in the latest municipal election.

Summary of the 2021 Milan City Council election results
Mayoral candidates	Votes	%	Leaders seats	Parties	Votes	%	Seats
Giuseppe Sala	277,478	57.73	–	Democratic Party	152,200	33.86	20
Giuseppe Sala	277,478	57.73	–	Beppe Sala for Mayor – We, Milan	41,135	9.15	5
Giuseppe Sala	277,478	57.73	–	Green Europe	19,281	5.11	3
Giuseppe Sala	277,478	57.73	–	The Reformers – Let's work for Milan with Sala	18,049	4.01	2
Giuseppe Sala	277,478	57.73	–	Healthy Milan	7,367	1.64	1
Giuseppe Sala	277,478	57.73	–	United Milan – The Left for Sala	7,012	1.56	–
Giuseppe Sala	277,478	57.73	–	Radical Milan with Sala	4,816	1.07	–
Giuseppe Sala	277,478	57.73	–	Volt	2,502	0.56	–
Giuseppe Sala	277,478	57.73	–	Total	256,075	56.96	31
Luca Bernardo	153,637	31.97	1	League	48,283	10.74	6
Luca Bernardo	153,637	31.97	1	Brothers of Italy	43,889	9.76	5
Luca Bernardo	153,637	31.97	1	Forza Italia	31,819	7.08	3
Luca Bernardo	153,637	31.97	1	Luca Bernardo for Mayor	14,055	3.13	1
Luca Bernardo	153,637	31.97	1	Popular Milan	8,367	1.86	1
Luca Bernardo	153,637	31.97	1	European Liberal Party	970	0.22	–
Luca Bernardo	153,637	31.97	1	Total	147,383	32.78	16
Gianluigi Paragone	14,366	2.99	–	Paragone for Mayor	12,366	2.75	–
Gianluigi Paragone	14,366	2.99	–	Great North	608	0.14	–
Gianluigi Paragone	14,366	2.99	–	Total	12,974	2.89	–
Layla Pavone	12,953	2.70	–	Five Star Movement	12,517	2.78	–
Gabriele Antonio Mariani	7,566	1.57	–	Milan in Common	4,648	1.03	–
Gabriele Antonio Mariani	7,566	1.57	–	Civic EnvironmentaList	2,527	0.56	–
Gabriele Antonio Mariani	7,566	1.57	–	Total	7,175	1.60	–
Giorgio Goggi	3,402	0.71	–	Socialists of Milan	1,984	0.44	–
Giorgio Goggi	3,402	0.71	–	Liberal Milan	838	0.19	–
Giorgio Goggi	3,402	0.71	–	Total	2,822	0.63	–
Bianca Tedone	2,750	0.57	–	Power to the People	2,752	0.57	–
Mauro Festa	2,201	0.46	–	Gay Party	2,103	0.47	–
Teodosio De Bonis	2,162	0.45	–	3V Movement	1,935	0.43	–
Marco Muggiani	1,385	0.29	–	Italian Communist Party	1,439	0.32	–
Alessandro Pascale	1,297	0.27	–	Communist Party	1,203	0.27	–
Bryant Biavaschi	859	0.18	–	Milan Starts Here	809	0.18	–
Natale Azzaretto	552	0.11	–	Workers' Communist Party	556	0.12	–
Total	480,608	100.00	1		449,563	100.00	47
Total valid votes	480,608	97.86					
Blank or invalid ballots	10,533	2.14					
Turnout	491,141	47.72					
Eligible voters	1,029,232	100.00					
Source: Ministry of the Interior

Popular vote
PD	33.86%
Lega	10.74%
FdI	9.76%
Sala list	9.15%
FI	7.08%
EV	5.11%
Reformists	4.01%
Bernardo list	3.13%
Others	17.16%

Popular vote (coalition)
Centre-left	56.96%
Centre-right	32.78%

Council Seats
PD	41.67%
Lega	12.50%
FdI	10.42%
Sala list	10.42%
FI	6.25%
EV	6.25%
Reformists	4.17%
Others	6.25%

Council Seats (coalition)
Centre-left	64.58%
Centre-right	35.42%

== Results in municipi ==
=== Presidents and Councils ===
The 9 municipi

Following the 2021 election, all the nine municipi were gained by the centre-left coalition.

Table below shows the results for each municipio with the percentage for each candidate and president elected:

Municipio	Centre-left		Centre-right		Others		Elected President	Party
Municipio	votes	%	votes	%	votes	%	Elected President	Party
1	23,017	62.48	12,149	32.98	1,671	4.54	Mattia Ibrahim Abdu	PD
2	27,427	55.36	18,637	37.60	3,488	7.04	Simone Locatelli	PD
3	32,477	58.23	17,343	31.10	5,949	10.67	Caterina Antola	PD
4	30,262	54.93	19,363	35.15	5,468	9.92	Stefano Bianco	SS
5	22,938	54.66	14,988	35.71	4,041	9.63	Natale Carapellese	PD
6	30,311	58.51	16,804	32.44	4,691	9.05	Santo Minniti	PD
7	31,747	53.47	22,038	37.12	5,586	9.41	Silvia Fossati	Ind
8	36,140	57.04	21,951	34.64	5,274	8.32	Giulia Pelucchi	PD
9	31,661	53.82	21,878	37.19	5,286	8.99	Anita Pirovano	SS

Source: Municipality of Milan - Electoral Service

Table below shows the seats for each coalition in every Municipal Council:

Municipio	Centre-left	Centre-right	Others	Total
1	21	9	–	30
2	18	12	–	30
3	21	9	–	30
4	18	11	1	30
5	18	11	1	30
6	18	10	2	30
7	18	11	1	30
8	18	11	1	30
9	18	11	1	30
Total	168	95	7	270

Source: Municipality of Milan - Electoral Service

== See also ==
- 2021 Italian local elections
