= Tomaso Staiti di Cuddia delle Chiuse =

Italian politician and journalist

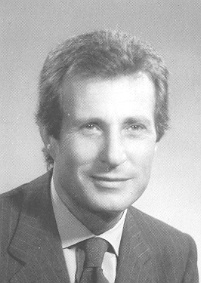

Member of the Chamber of Deputies
- In office 20 June 1979 – 22 April 1992
- Constituency: Milan

Personal details
- Born: 2 December 1932 Vercelli, Italy
- Died: 1 March 2017 (aged 84) Milan, Italy
- Party: Italian Social Movement

Tomaso Staiti di Cuddia delle Chiuse (2 December 1932 – 1 March 2017) was an Italian journalist and politician.
