= Giuliano Pisapia =

Italian politician (born 1949)

Giuliano Pisapia MEP
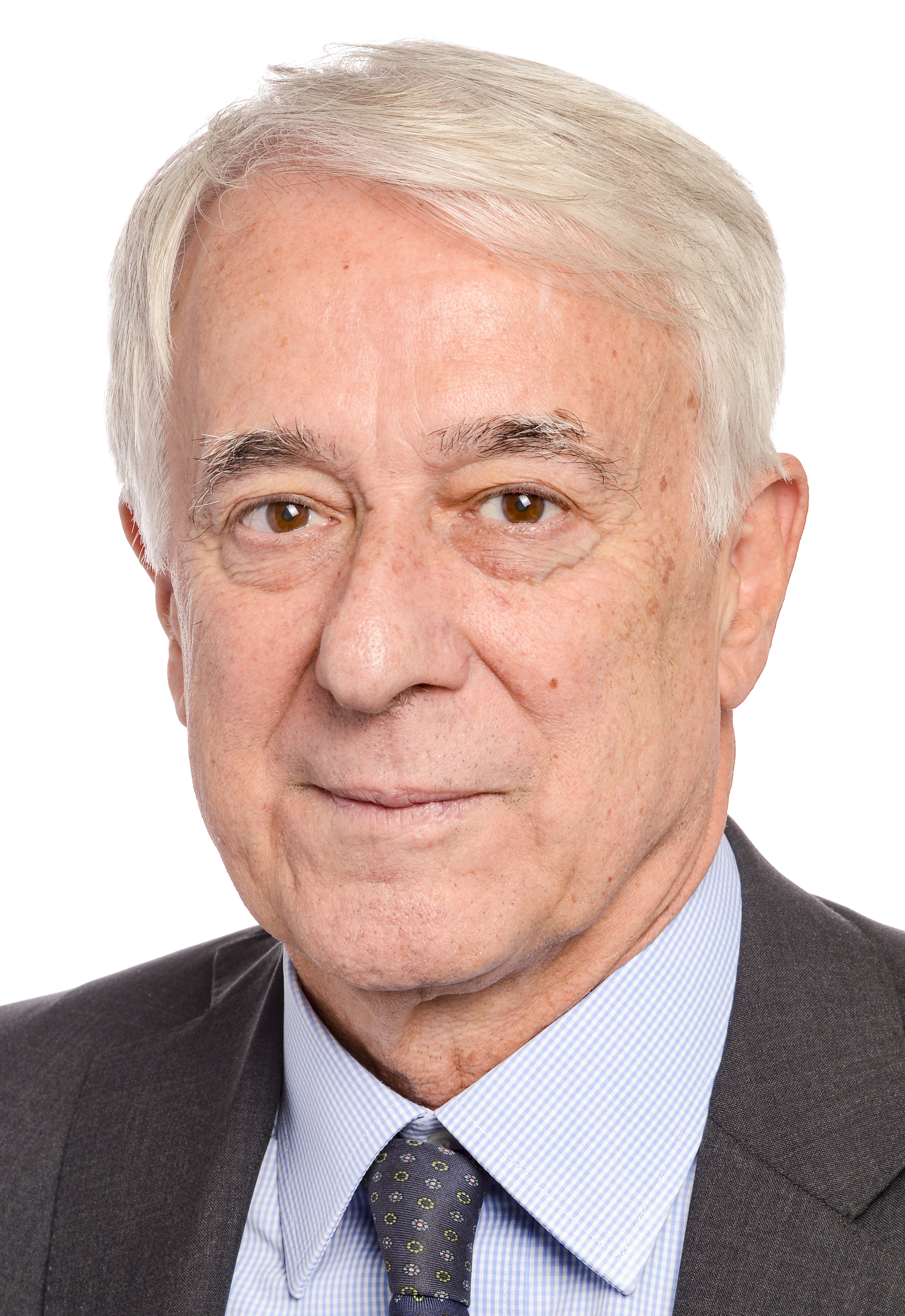

Member of the European Parliament
- In office 2 July 2019 – 15 July 2024
- Constituency: North-West Italy

Mayor of Milan
- In office 1 June 2011 – 21 June 2016
- Preceded by: Letizia Moratti
- Succeeded by: Giuseppe Sala

Member of the Chamber of Deputies
- In office 9 May 1996 – 27 April 2006
- Constituency: Lombardy 1

Personal details
- Born: 20 May 1949 (age 77) Milan, Italy
- Party: DP (1978–1991); PRC (1991–2010); Independent (2010–2017); CP (2017); Independent (since 2018)
- Spouse: Cinzia Sasso (m. 2011)
- Education: University of Milan
- Profession: Lawyer

Giuliano Pisapia (Italian pronunciation: [dʒuˈljaːno pizaˈpiːa]; born 20 May 1949) is an Italian lawyer, politician, former mayor of Milan, former member of the Italian Parliament and former member of the European Parliament. As a politician, he has been a member of two left-wing parties, first Proletarian Democracy and then the Communist Refoundation Party; in Milan's mayoral election, he was endorsed by a large left-wing coalition, after winning the primary election of the centre-left coalition with the strong support of Nichi Vendola's Left Ecology Freedom.

As a lawyer, he participated in a number of notable trials with political implications, including that of PKK leader Abdullah Öcalan and the trial that followed the death of anti-global activist Carlo Giuliani, shot by the police during the 27th G8 summit.

== Biography ==
Giuliano Pisapia is the son of lawyer Gian Domenico Pisapia, who has contributed to the definition of the Italian Code of Criminal Procedure of 1989. In the 1970s he joined Proletarian Democracy, a far-leftist party. He attended the Liceo classico "Giovanni Berchet" in Milan. After being a volunteer in the Red Cross and a student in Medicine, a worker in a chemical factory, a teacher in the Beccaria youth detention centre, and an employee in a bank, he finally turned to political and law studies, getting a double degree in Political Sciences and Law, and joining his father's firm.

Pisapia's activity as a lawyer was strictly related to his political commitment, as he took part in a number of trials with explicit political implications. For example, he represented Arnaldo Forlani in the Tangentopoli scandal era, activist Ovidio Bompressi in the trial for the murder of Luigi Calabresi, the family of anti-global activist Carlo Giuliani (shot dead by the police during the 27th G8 summit), as well as the daughter of Davide Cesare ("Dax"), killed by a neonazi in 2003. He also participated in international trials, most notably in defence of Abdullah Öcalan, leader of the Kurdish militant organization PKK.

In 1995 Gian Domenico Pisapia died, and Giuliano refused to candidate for regional administrative elections to focus on his father's law firm. Nevertheless, in 1996 he joined the Communist Refoundation Party led by Fausto Bertinotti and was elected to the Parliament. As a member of the Parliament, in 1998 he voted for the motion of confidence to Romano Prodi's centre-leftist government, despite the decision of the Bertinotti to vote against it (a decision that would eventually cause Prodi's resignation). After the failure of Prodi's government, Pisapia volunteered for a while in a refugee camp on the border of Albania. In 2001 he was re-elected to the Parliament, again for Communist Refoundation.

In 2011, with the support of Left Ecology Freedom and the Democratic Party, he became the left-wing candidate for the seat of Mayor of Milan (a traditional stronghold of the right wing and Silvio Berlusconi) and defeated incumbent Mayor Letizia Moratti on 30 May.

== Mayor of Milan (2011–2016) ==
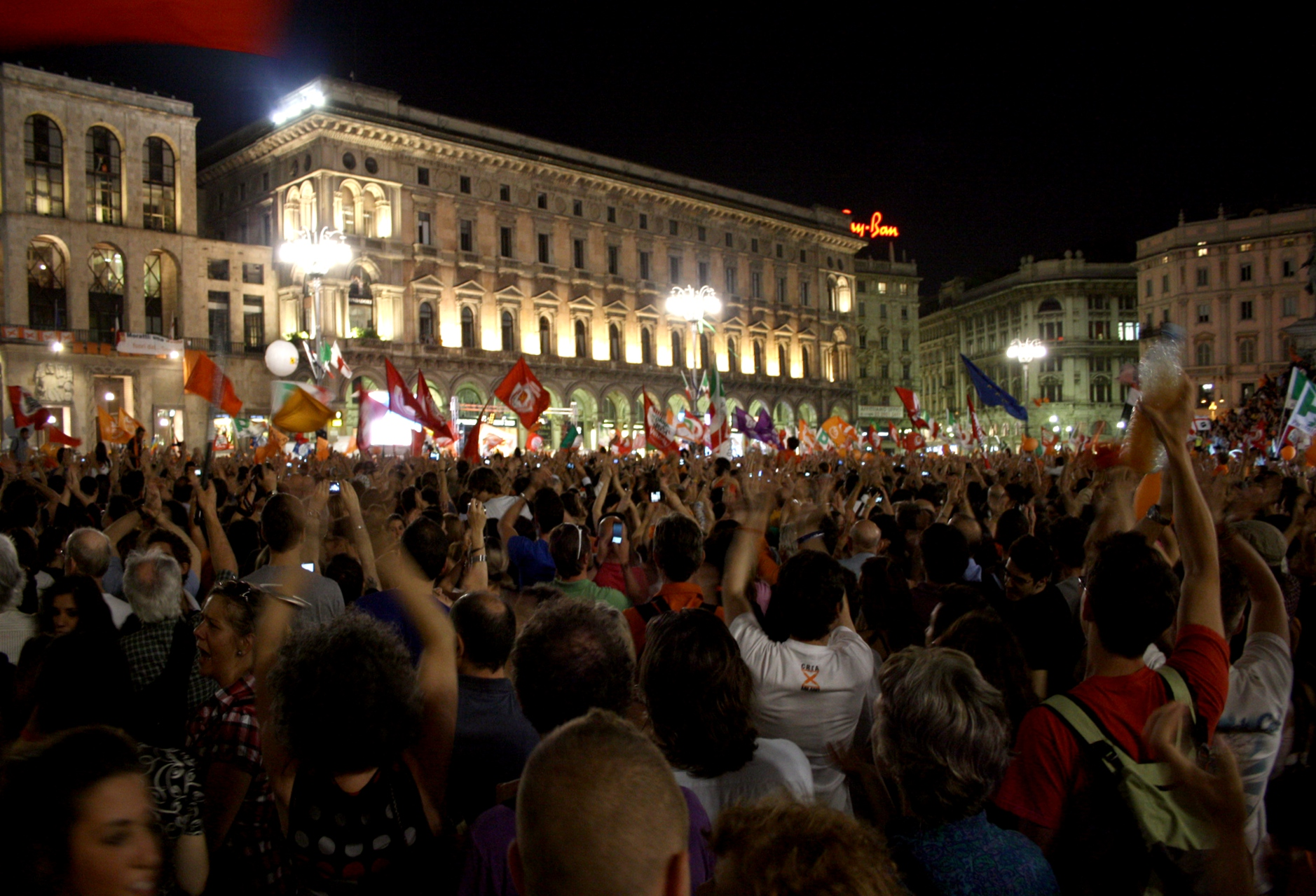
Piazza del Duomo: supporters of Pisapia celebrating his election on 30 May 2011.

In June 2010, Pisapia was the first to submit his nomination as the Mayor of Milan, for the elections that would take place the following year. A number of intellectuals and notable people from the cultural and political elite of Milan immediately expressed their support of Pisapia. On 14 November he ran for the primary elections of the center-leftist coalition led by the Democratic Party, with the support of Nichi Vendola's Left Ecology Freedom, and unexpectedly won (receiving 45% preferences) despite not being an actual member of the PD.

At the beginning of the campaign, incumbent Letizia Moratti was considered the favourite. Milan is traditionally a right-wing stronghold, the homeland of Silvio Berlusconi's party (to which Moratti belongs), as well as a symbol of the alliance between Berlusconi and Umberto Bossi's Lega Nord, a party that promotes greater independence of Northern Italy. Both Bossi and Berlusconi repeatedly declared that the left wing had no chance to win the elections in Milan, and Berlusconi himself actively contributed to the campaign, possibly to reaffirm his appeal to the Italian people leveraging on the results of what was supposed to be an easy match. As Berlusconi had recently been involved in a number of controversial matters, including the so-called Ruby Gate, many observers described the elections in Milan as a poll that would assess the popular support of Berlusconi's politics. This attracted much attention to this particular election (one of many administrative elections held in the same days in several locations in Italy).

In the first round of elections, on 15–16 May 2011, Pisapia got 48% of the votes and Moratti 41%. As none of them exceeded 50%, a second face-to-face round was scheduled for 29–30 May. This first success of Pisapia was one of a number of successes of the left wing in several other cities and provinces. With the campaign reaching ever harsher tones than before, Pisapia finally won on 30 May, with 55% of the votes. Internet and social networks played a relevant role in the election of Pisapia.

On 1 January 2015, Pisapia became the first mayor of the newborn Metropolitan City of Milan.

== After the mayoralty (2016–present) ==
=== Progressive Camp ===
On 14 February 2017, Pisapia founded Progressive Camp, a democratic socialist political party. His aim is creating a new centre-left coalition including, if possible, the Democratic Party.

=== Member of the European Parliament ===
In the 2019 European election, Pisapia stood for election as an independent candidate for the Democratic Party, being elected with more than 267,000 preference votes.

In parliament, Pisapia serves on the five-member Advisory Committee on the Conduct of Members, the parliament's body responsible for assessing alleged breaches of its code of conduct and advising the President of the European Parliament on possible action to be taken,

Italian Chamber of Deputies
Preceded by Title jointly held	Deputy for Lombardy I 1996–2006	Succeeded by Title jointly held
Political offices
Preceded by Letizia Moratti	Mayor of Milan; 2011–2016	Succeeded by Giuseppe Sala
