= Giuseppe Sala (politician) =

Italian politician (born 1958)

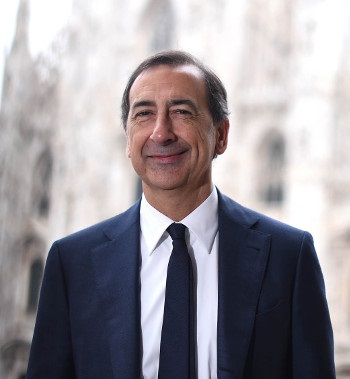
- Sala in 2021

Mayor of Milan
- Incumbent
- Assumed office 21 June 2016
- Preceded by: Giuliano Pisapia

CEO of Expo 2015
- In office June 2010 – December 2015

Personal details
- Born: 28 May 1958 (age 68) Milan, Italy
- Party: European Green Party
- Education: Bocconi University
- Profession: Manager, politician

Giuseppe "Peppe" Sala (born 28 May 1958) is an Italian manager and politician, currently mayor of Milan. He was CEO of Expo 2015 in Milan from 2010 to 2015. He became mayor of Milan in 2016, supported by the centre-left coalition, and he was confirmed for a second term in the 2021 municipal election.

== Business career ==
=== Expo 2015 ===
In 2015, Milan hosted the Universal Exposition; the themes were technology, innovation, culture and traditions concerning food. Participants in the Expo included 145 countries, three international organisations, several civil society organisations, several corporations and non-governmental organizations (NGOs). The participants were hosted inside individual or grouped pavilions. In June 2010 Sala was appointed CEO of the Expo, which led to the nickname "Mr. Expo" in the following years.

The opening of the Expo on 1 May 2015 was marred by protests from anti-austerity activists, black bloc, and anarchists which caused criminal damage, resulting in the police using tear gas.

Expo also created some tensions with the Holy See and the Italian government; in fact Pope Francis condemned the concept of Expo, saying that it "obeys the culture of waste and does not contribute to a model of equitable and sustainable development". As Vatican City invested €3 million to obtain its own pavilion at the event before his appointment to the papacy, Francis said that, although it is a good thing that the Church is involved in causes that battle hunger and promote cleaner energy, he stated that too much money was wasted on the Expo itself by Vatican City.

== Mayor of Milan (2016–present) ==
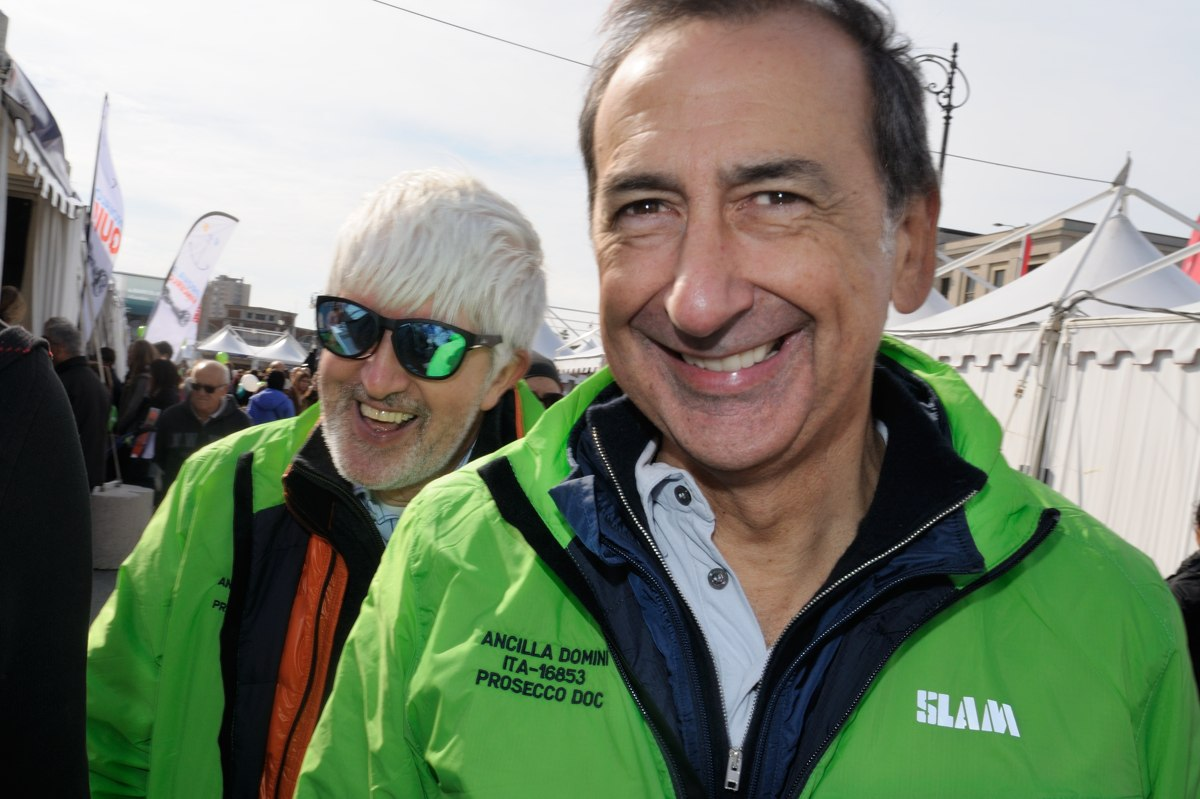
Giuseppe Sala with the journalist Beppe Severgnini in October 2016.

On 22 March 2015, the incumbent mayor of Milan, Giuliano Pisapia, announced that he had chosen not to run for re-election in 2016 for a second term in office. Following Pisapia's decision, the ruling center-left coalition decided to call an open primary election to choose a new single mayoral candidate.

Sala and three other people registered to be candidates in this election. The other candidates were Francesca Balzani, the then deputy mayor of Milan, responsible for the Budget in Milan's municipal government and a former Member of the European Parliament; Pierfrancesco Majorino, then responsible for Social Equalities in the municipal government of Milan; and Antonio Iannetta, the former president of UISP.

The election took place on 6–7 February 2016 and Sala won with 25,600 and 42.3% of the vote.

On 5 June, in the first round of the municipal election Sala gained 41.7% of first votes; on 19 June, in the second round, he defeated the centre-right candidate Stefano Parisi with 51.7% against 48.3%.

On 16 December 2016, Sala suspended himself from office after learning that he was named in an investigation regarding the Expo 2015. He then retired that suspension a few days later.

On 7 December 2020, he chose to run for re-election in 2021.

On 11 March 2021, Sala joined the European Green Party, after years of political independence in the centre-left area.

Sala won in October 2021 a second term with almost 60% of the total popular vote.

== Other activities ==
- EAT Foundation, Member of the Advisory Board
