= Giampiero Borghini =

Italian politician

Giampiero Borghini (born 20 April 1943) is a Socialist politician and translator. He was also affiliated with Forza Italia. He was born in Brescia. He was mayor of Milan.

Preceded by Paolo Pillitteri	Mayor of Milan; 1992–1993	Succeeded by Marco Formentini
