= Letizia Moratti =

Italian politician (born 1949)

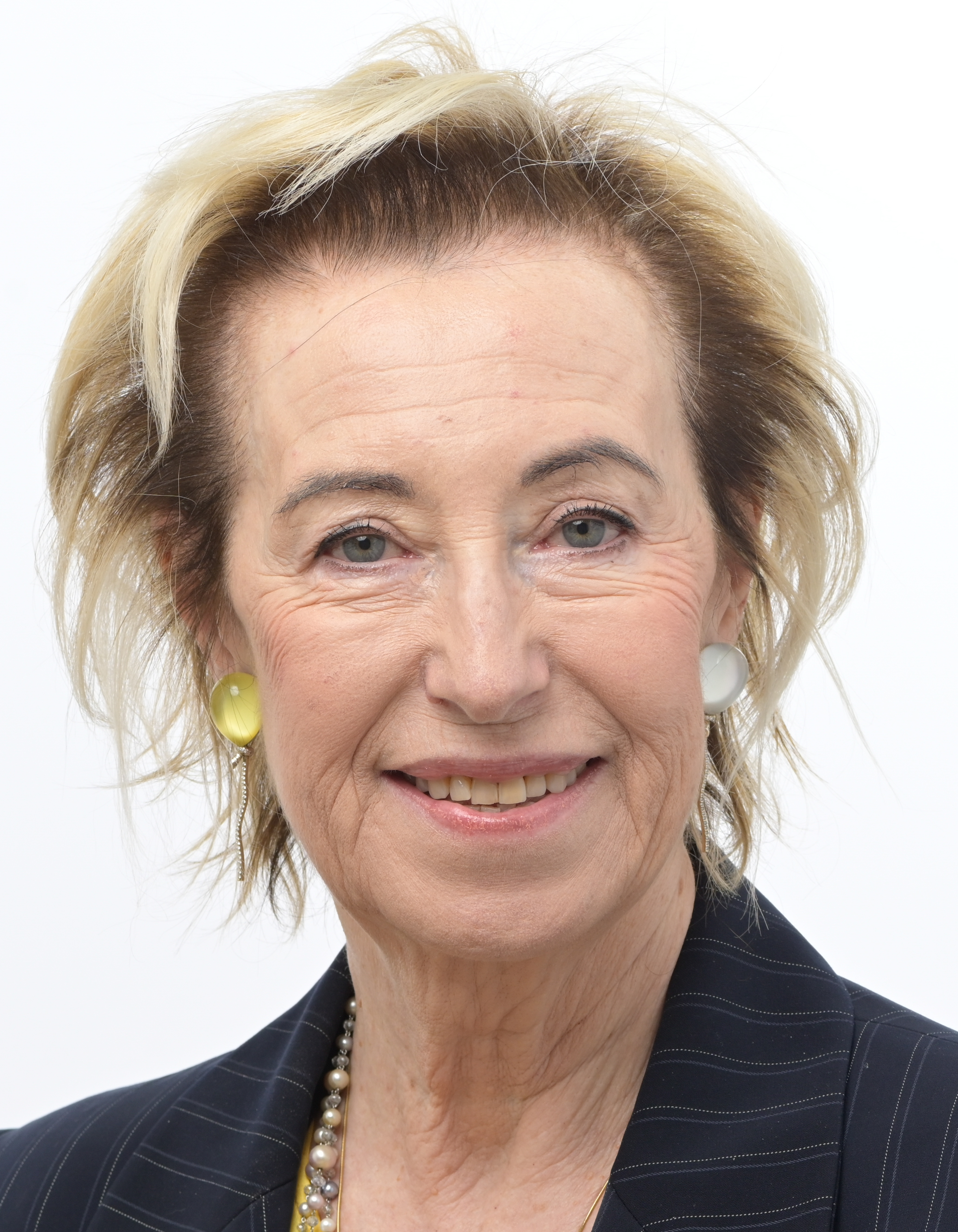
- Official portrait, 2024

Member of the European Parliament for North-West Italy
- Incumbent
- Assumed office 16 July 2024

Mayor of Milan
- In office 1 June 2006 – 1 June 2011
- Preceded by: Gabriele Albertini
- Succeeded by: Giuliano Pisapia

Minister of Education, University and Research
- In office 11 June 2001 – 17 May 2006
- Prime Minister: Silvio Berlusconi
- Preceded by: Tullio De Mauro (Public Education); Ortensio Zecchino (University and Research)
- Succeeded by: Giuseppe Fioroni (Public Education); Fabio Mussi (University and Research)

Chairperson of RAI
- In office 12 July 1994 – 24 April 1996
- Preceded by: Claudio Demattè
- Succeeded by: Giuseppe Morello

Vice President and Assessor of Welfare of Lombardy
- In office 8 January 2021 – 2 November 2022
- President: Attilio Fontana
- Preceded by: Giulio Gallera
- Succeeded by: Guido Bertolaso

Personal details
- Born: Letizia Maria Brichetto Arnaboldi; 26 November 1949 (age 76) Milan, Italy
- Party: FI (2023–present)
- Other political affiliations: Independent (2001–2009); PdL (2009–2011); Independent (2011–2023)
- Spouse: Gian Marco Moratti (m. 1973; died 2018)
- Children: 2
- Relatives: Massimo Moratti (brother-in-law)
- Education: University of Milan
- Occupation: Company manager, politician

Letizia Maria Moratti (née Brichetto Arnaboldi; born 26 November 1949) is an Italian businesswoman and politician. She was president of RAI (1994–1996), Minister of Education, University and Research (2001–2006), mayor of Milan (2006–2011), and president of the board of directors of UBI Banca (2019–2020). In January 2021, she was appointed vice president and Assessor of Welfare of Lombardy.

== Early life and education ==
Moratti was born in Milan. She graduated in political science from the University of Milan. She was married to the oil magnate Gianmarco Moratti (brother of Massimo Moratti) and has two children.

== Career ==
=== Minister of Education, University and Research ===
Moratti is a businesswoman who has worked in insurance and telecommunications. Between 1994 and 1996, she was chairperson of the Italian state television company RAI. At the end of 1998, for about a year she became chairman of News Corp Europe, a company headed by Rupert Murdoch and owner of Stream TV. From 2001 to 2006, Moratti was Minister of Education, University and Research in the second and third Berlusconi cabinets. During her mandate, she put forward a reform of the education system, which became the Moratti Law. She ran in the 2006 Milan municipal election as the House of Freedoms mayoralty candidate and won with over 52% of the votes. She sought a second term in the 2011 Milan municipal but lost to the centre-left coalition candidate Giuliano Pisapia.

=== Mayor of Milan (2006–2011) ===
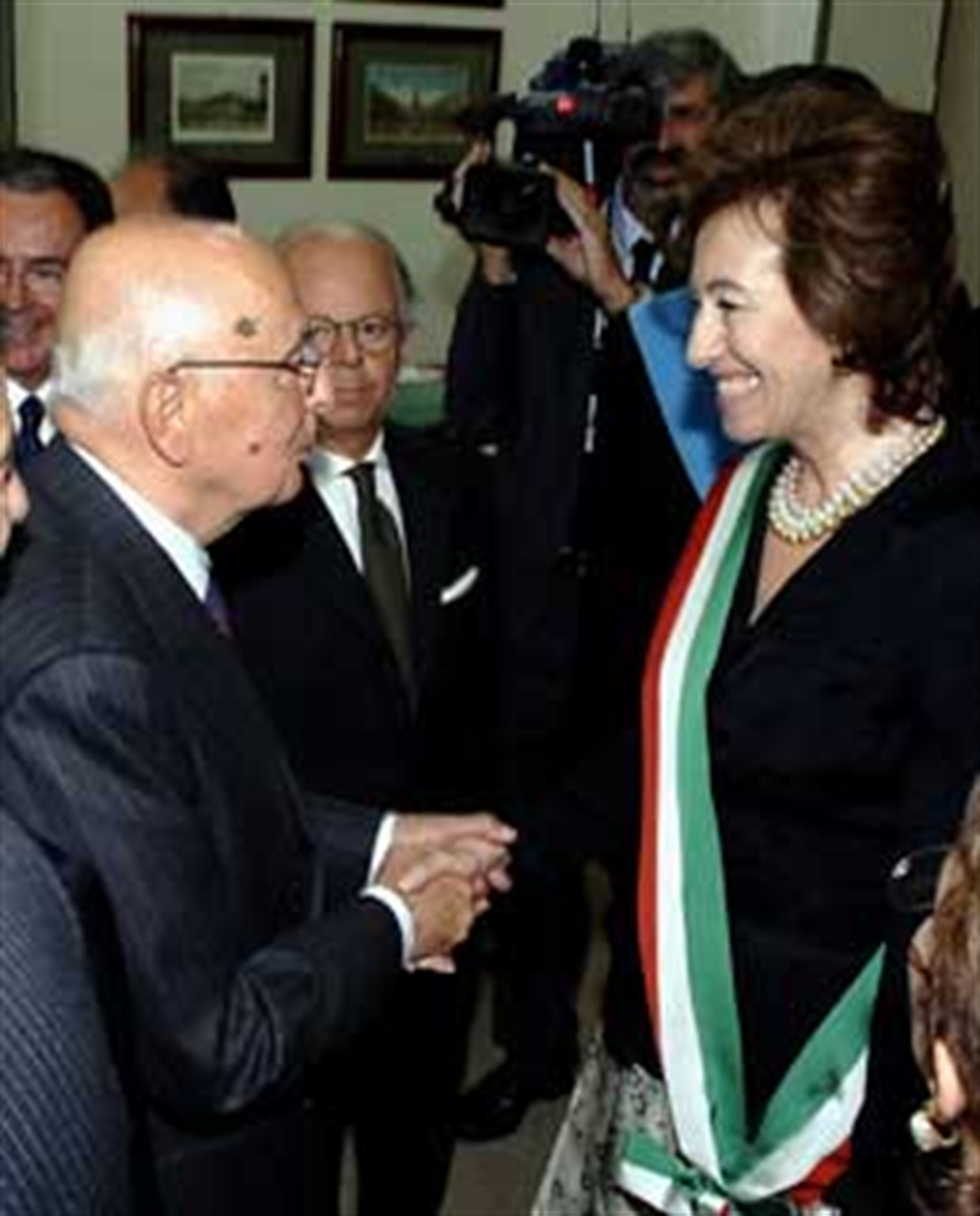
Moratti with the then Italian president Giorgio Napolitano at Palazzo Mezzanotte in 2006

==== Expo 2015 ====
Under Moratti, Milan was selected in 2007 as the hosting city for the Expo 2015. Its rival İzmir, Turkey, lost by 61 votes against 86 in the Bureau des Expositions gather in the Palais des congrès of Paris. Moratti was commissioner of the Expo until 2011, when after her electoral loss, she resigned as commissioner out of respect for the new administration.

==== Parks ====
The Moratti administration continued Gabriele Albertini's parking program, and in 2006 created 64,000 underground parking spaces, also in neighbourhoods like Naviglio Grande and Sant'Ambrogio's zone. In 2007, Moratti launched the Cycle Mobiliting Plan, which foresaw 53 km of cycling infrastructures, 2,385 new racks in 1,174 different localities, with 5,000 bikes and 250 stations in all cities within 2011. In 2008, Moratti created the Ecopass, a road pricing in the Milan Centre. This decision received several criticisms from the majority. In 2010, she also launched the use of public electric car in various zones of her city.

Moratti proposed unsuccessfully a park dedicated to Bettino Craxi, the controversial Italian Socialist Party leader who died while exiled in Tunisia in 2000.

=== Assessor of Welfare and Vice President of Lombardy (January 2021 – November 2022) ===
In January 2021, Moratti was appointed vice president and Assessor of Welfare in the Regional Cabinet of Lombardy. She resigned on 2 November 2022 to be a candidate for president of Lombardy. With 9.87% of the vote, she came in third place, failing to get elected.

== Controversies ==
In 2006, Moratti was accused of firing 10 executives of the city. For this spoils system, Moratti was convicted of office abuse. The sentence was archived because her acts were not illegal. She served in the city council only 6 presences in 2008 and 3 in 2009. In 2007, Moratti intervened to prevent the opening of Art and Homosexuality – From von Gloeden to Pierre et Gilles at the Palazzo della Ragione in Milan. Curated by Eugenio Viola and promoted by Vittorio Sgarbi, Moratti backed objections to the exhibition from Catholic politicians and insisted that it would only proceed if a blacklist of works were removed on the ground that they could be offensive to Catholics and unsuitable for children.

Moratti appointed Lucio Stanca, a member of the Chamber of Deputies, as managing director for the Expo 2015, despite the vote of the city council against her decision. In 2010, a civil court complained against Moratti administration, the minister Roberto Maroni and the prefect of Milan Gan Valerio Lombardi for the lack of appointment of popular houses to 10 Romani families, called it a "racist gesture". The accused justified themselves saying the Roma were a nomadic people.

Political offices
Preceded by Tullio De Mauro (Instruction) Giuliano Amato ad interim (University and Research)	Minister of Education; 2001–2006	Succeeded by Giuseppe Fioroni (Instruction) Fabio Mussi (University and Research)
Preceded by Gabriele Albertini	Mayor of Milan; 2006–2011	Succeeded by Giuliano Pisapia
Preceded by Fabrizio Sala (Vice President); Giulio Gallera (Assessor of Welfare)	Vice President and Assessor of Welfare of Lombardy; 2021–present	Succeeded by Incumbent
