= Marco Formentini (politician) =

Italian politician (1930–2021)

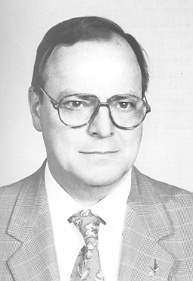

Mayor of Milan
- In office 21 June 1993 – 12 May 1997
- Preceded by: Giampiero Borghini
- Succeeded by: Gabriele Albertini

Member of the European Parliament
- In office 19 July 1994 – 20 July 2004
- Constituency: North-West Italy

Member of the Chamber of Deputies
- In office 23 April 1992 – 14 September 1993
- Constituency: Milan

Personal details
- Born: 14 April 1930 La Spezia, Italy
- Died: 2 January 2021 (aged 90) Milan, Italy
- Party: PSI (1970-1991); LN (1991–1999); Dem (1999–2002); DL (2002–2007); PD (2007-2008); DCA (2008-2009); PdL (2009-2013)
- Education: Vrije Universiteit Brussel
- Profession: Politician

Marco Formentini (14 April 1930 – 2 January 2021) was an Italian politician from the Northern League, then for the Democrats and finally for The Daisy. During his youth, he was a member of the Italian Socialist Party.

After being a member first of the Italian (1992–1993), and then the European Parliament (1994–2004).

He was mayor of Milan from 1993 to 1997. He managed the Via Palestro massacre. In January 1997, he faced a public confrontation with Giorgio Strehler over the management of the Piccolo Teatro.

Elected for the second time to the European Parliament in 1999, he switched to Romano Prodi's Democrats soon after the election.

== Electoral history ==
Election	House	Constituency	Party	Votes	Result
1992	Chamber of Deputies	Milan–Pavia	LN	8,854	Elected
1994	European Parliament	North-West Italy	LN	204,728	Elected
1999	European Parliament	North-West Italy	LN	69,579	Elected
2004	European Parliament	North-West Italy	DL	9,288	Not Elected
