= Gabriele Albertini =

Italian politician

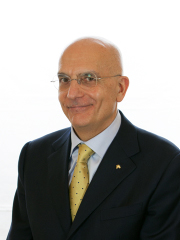

Member of the Senate
- In office 15 March 2013 – 22 March 2018
- Constituency: Lombardy

Member of the European Parliament
- In office 20 July 2004 – 15 March 2013
- Constituency: North-West Italy

Mayor of Milan
- In office 12 May 1997 – 1 June 2006
- Preceded by: Marco Formentini
- Succeeded by: Letizia Moratti

Personal details
- Born: 6 July 1950 (age 76) Milan, Italy
- Party: FI (1997–2009); PdL (2009–2012); SC (2012–2013); NCD (2014–2018)
- Education: University of Milan
- Profession: Politician, entrepreneur

Gabriele Albertini (born 6 July 1950) is an Italian politician and entrepreneur.

== Biography ==
In 1974 he graduated in Law from the University of Milan. He was the Manager of Albertini Cesare Spa, a company working in the aluminium pressure die casting sector, from 1974 to 1997. In 1987 he became a delegate for small business on the executive board of Federmeccanica (the Italian Mechanical Engineers' Trade Union Federation) and in 1996 he became its Chairman (until 1997).

In 1997 he was elected Mayor of Milan, with the support of the centre-right coalition, and held office until 2006.

In the 2004 European election and the subsequent 2009 EP election, he was elected MEP. He was a member of the European People's Party's group, and sat on the European Parliament's Committee on Transport and Tourism. He was also a delegate on the Committee on Industry, Research and Energy, Vice-Chair of the Delegation for Relations at NATO's Parliamentary Assembly and a member of the EU's Delegation for Relations with the United States.

In 2013 he ran for President of the Lombardy region, supported by a centrist coalition, but he got only 4.12% of the vote. In the same year, he was elected Senator on the Civic Choice list.

== Decorations ==
- Order of Friendship of the Russian Federation
- Grand Cordon of the Order of Independence of the Kingdom of Jordan
- Officer of the Legion of Honour of the French Republic
- Knight Grand Cross of the Royal Norwegian Order of Merit
- Grand Officer of the Order of Merit of the Grand Duchy of Luxembourg
- Grand Officer of the Order of Saints Maurice and Lazarus
- Silver Cross of Merit of the Equestrian Order of the Holy Sepulchre of Jerusalem
- Grand Officer of the Order pro Merito Melitensi of the Sovereign Military Order of Malta
- Commander of Merit of the Sacred Military Constantinian Order of Saint George
- Honorary Knight Commander of the Most Excellent Order of the British Empire
- Grand Officer of the Order of Prince Henry (31 January 2005)

== Electoral history ==
Election	House	Constituency	Party	Votes	Result
2004	European Parliament	North-West Italy	FI	140,383	Elected
2009	European Parliament	North-West Italy	PdL	67,128	Elected
2013	Senate of the Republic	Lombardy	PdL	– (Note: Elected in a closed list proportional representation system.)	Elected

== See also ==
- 2009 European Parliament election in Italy
