= Elections in Milan =

Political elections for public offices in Milan

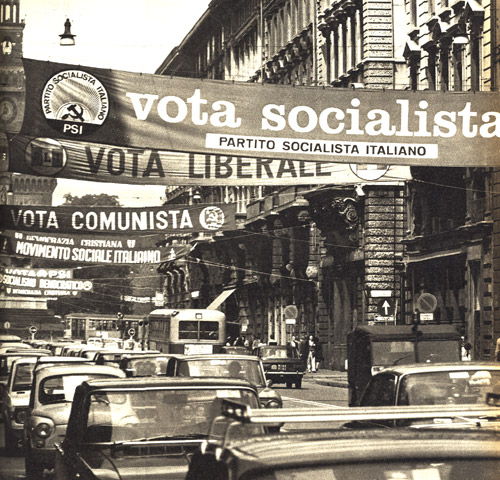
Electoral banners in Milan in the early 1970s

All Milan residents who are at least 18 years old and hold an EU citizenship are eligible to vote for the mayor and the City Council, as well as for the president and the Council of the Municipality where they reside.

Since 1993 Italian mayors are directly elected. In all the cities with a population higher than 15,000 the voters express a choice for a mayor-candidate and/or for a party or civic list, not necessarily linked to the same mayor-candidate (voto disgiunto). If no mayor-candidate receives an absolute majority, the top two candidates go to a runoff election (ballottaggio) after two weeks. The City Council and Municipalities Councils elections are based on a proportional system with preferences: for each list, the candidates with the most preferences are elected proportionally to the seats assigned to the list, with the lists supporting the elected mayor being granted around 60% of the total seats to guarantee governability.

Elections are scheduled every five years, usually between 15 April and 15 June. The last election was held in 2021.

== Elections during the Kingdom of Italy (1861–1946) ==
=== City Council election, 1889 ===
The election took place on 10 November 1889.

Comprehensive group	Votes	Seats
Liberal-conservatives		50
Democrats and radicals		30
Total		80

Sunday 10 November 1889

=== City Council election, 1895 ===
The election took place on 10 February 1895.

Comprehensive group	Votes (first / last candidate)	Seats
Liberal-conservatives and clericals	14,673 / 13,531	64
Democrats, radicals and socialists	15,651 / 13,485	16
Total		80

Sunday 10 February 1895

=== City Council election, 1899 ===
The election took place on 11 June 1899.

Comprehensive group	Votes (first / last candidate)	Seats
Democrats, radicals and socialists	19,234 / 18,123	38
Liberal-conservatives and clericals	14,255 / 13,359	42
Total		80

Sunday 11 June 1899

=== City Council election, 1905 ===
The election took place on 29 January 1905.

Comprehensive group	Votes (first / last candidate)	Seats
Liberal-conservatives	19,074 / 18,637	30
Democrats, radicals and socialists	18,468 / 17,570	27
Clericals	18,279 / 17,488	23
Total		80

Sunday 29 January 1905

=== City Council election, 1911 ===
The election took place on 22 January 1911.

It was the first municipal election which involved the complete renewal of the City Council after six years. Elections which brought to a partial renewal of the City Council were held in 1907 and in 1910.

Comprehensive group	Votes (first / last candidate)	Seats
Liberal-conservatives	16,953 / 15,451	64
Socialists	18,469 / 9,808	16
Democrats	9,594 / 8,286	0
Total		80

Sunday 22 January 1911.

=== City Council election, 1914 ===
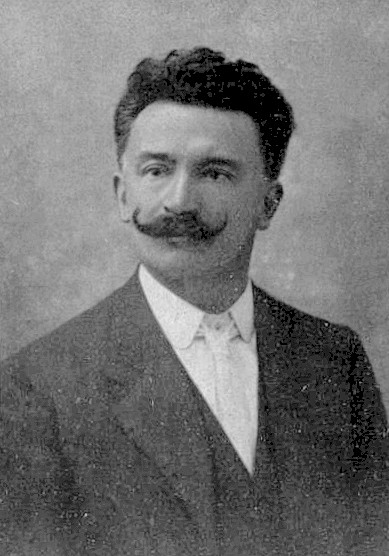
Emilio Caldara, the first socialist Mayor (1914–1920)

The election took place on 14 June 1914.

It was the first municipal election held by universal manhood suffrage. Changes made by the 1912 electoral reform widened the voting franchise to include all literate men aged 21 or over who had served in the armed forces. For those over 30 the literacy requirement was abolished. The political debate on the enlargement of the right to vote had begun in the early years of the new century. The Socialists, in fact, but also the Radicals and the Republicans, had long demanded the introduction of universal manhood suffrage, necessary in a modern liberal democracy. The Italian Prime Minister Giovanni Giolitti declared himself in favor of universal male suffrage, believing that the extension of the franchise would bring more conservative rural voters to the polls as well as drawing votes from grateful socialists. But after the 1913 national election, became clear that the universal male suffrage, contrary to Giolitti's opinions, would have destabilized the entire political establishment: the "mass parties" were the ones who benefitted from the new electoral system.

In a huge blow for the traditional moderate and liberal groups which had dominated both national and milanese political system for more than 50 years, the socialists were able to win the super-majority of seats in the City Council granted by the local electoral law for the first time in history and their leader, Emilio Caldara, became the first socialist Mayor of a major Italian city.

Due to the mechanism of the majoritarian electoral system, which granted a representation in the City Council just for the majority party and for the party which came second in the election, both the radicals and the republicans didn't obtain a single seat.

Comprehensive list	Votes	%	Seats
Italian Socialist Party	34,596	45.6	64
Liberal-clerical Bloc	32,876	41.4	16
Italian Radical Party	8,750	11.7	0
Italian Republican Party	900	1.3	0
Total			80

Sunday 14 June 1914.

=== City Council election, 1920 ===
Electoral symbols of the Italian Socialist Party (left) and the National Bloc (right) in 1920

Last election before the rise of the fascist regime took place on 7 November 1920.

The election was originally scheduled to take place in June 1918 but was postponed due to the First World War. In March 1919 Benito Mussolini had founded in Milan the political organization Fasci Italiani di Combattimento, which was incorporated in an ultra-conservative coalition formed also by the liberals and the nationalists led by Enrico Corradini, and other right-wing forces.

Despite the intense violent activity of the fascist paramilitary groups during the electoral campaign, the socialists were able to retain the majority in the City Council for a few votes.

Comprehensive list	Votes	%	Seats
Italian Socialist Party	67,349	50.6	64
National Bloc	65,748	49.4	16
Total			80

Sunday 7 November 1920.

=== City Council election, 1922 ===
Electoral symbols of the National Bloc (left) and the Unitary Socialist Party (right) in 1922

The last democratic election after the rise of the fascist regime took place on 10 December 1922.

It was a snap election after two years of fascist death threats to the previous Socialist municipal councillors and the final removal of Mayor Angelo Filippetti by the Royal police under the accusation of a republican riot.

The Fasci Italiani di Combattimento incorporated an ultra-conservative coalition formed also by the liberals and the Italian People's Party, and other right-wing forces. Following the intense violent activity of the fascist paramilitary groups during the electoral campaign, the Centre-right coalition was able to gain the majority in the City Council face to the leftists forces which were divided by their leadership struggles.

Senator Luigi Mangiagalli became the new Mayor. In 1926 he volountarly dismissed following the introduction of the new system of fascist city Governors.

Comprehensive list	Votes	%	Seats
National Bloc	87,368	57.4	64
Unitary Socialist Party	45,254	29.8	15
Italian Socialist Party	17,259	11.3	1
Communist Party of Italy	2,288	1.5	-
Total			80

Sunday 10 December 1922.

== Elections during the Italian Republic (since 1946) ==
=== City Council election, 1946 ===
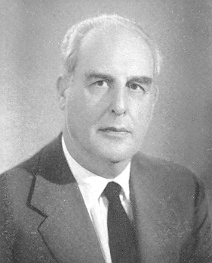
Antonio Greppi, the first democratic Mayor (1945–1951)

The first democratic election after the fall of fascism took place on 7 April 1946.

After the defeat of the Nazis forces on 25 April 1945, socialist politician Antonio Greppi had been appointed as Provisional Mayor by the National Liberation Committee (CLN) under approval of the United Nations military government. When the authority of the Italian government was restored on 1 January 1946, local elections were called in Northern Italy.

Proportional representation and Westminster system were the principles chosen to restore municipal democracy in Italy.

After the clear socialist victory, Greppi was confirmed Mayor by the City Council, and an executive board of municipal unity was formed: the alliance between PSIUP, DC and PCI ruled Milan as it ruled Italy at time.

Parties		Votes	%	Seats
Italian Socialist Party of Proletarian Unity	PSIUP	225,383	36.2	29
Christian Democracy	DC	167,316	26.9	22
Italian Communist Party	PCI	155,140	24.9	20
National Democratic Union	UDN	45,864	7.3	6
Italian Republican Party-Action Party	PRI-PdA	19,168	3.1	2
Local Traders List		9,931	1.6	1
Total		622,702	100.0	80

Sunday 7 April 1946. Sources: La Stampa , Unimi , 1946–1955 Local Elections (Italian)

=== City Council election, 1951 ===
The second post-war election took place on 27 May 1951.

Political situation had deeply changed during the previous five years. A new social-democratic party had broken away from the Socialist Party, and the alliances of anti-fascist unity had ended both at national and at local level. The Communist Party had left the administration of Milan in 1949, as the remaining Socialist Party had moved to a position of abstention. Antonio Greppi had joined the social-democratic group and formed a new centrist alliance with the DC, the PLI and the PRI.

In 1951 Alcide De Gasperi's government changed the local electoral law to a block voting system, to ensure the leadership of its local administrations: two thirds of the seats would be ensured to the winning coalition, abolishing the proportional representation.

The centrist incumbent coalition obtained an absolute majority with 53% of suffrages, which was changed into a 66% of seats by the electoral mechanism. However Greppi, who had unsuccessfully called for a coalition of socialist unity between the PSDI and the PSI, lost the support of the DC. Virgilio Ferrari, a social-democratic activist, was elected Mayor on 25 June.

Coalitions and parties	Votes	%	+/-	Seats	+/-	Seats by party — Seats by coalition
Centrist Coalition	412,246	53.2		53		Seats by party — Seats by coalition
Christian Democracy	238,693	30.8	▲3.9	30	▲8	Seats by party — Seats by coalition
Italian Democratic Socialist Party	111,185	14.3	▲14.3	15	▲15	Seats by party — Seats by coalition
Italian Liberal Party	49,299	6.4	▼0.9	6	Steady	Seats by party — Seats by coalition
Italian Republican Party	13,069	1.7	▼1.4	2	Steady	Seats by party — Seats by coalition
Leftist Coalition	291,796	37.8		21		Seats by party — Seats by coalition
Italian Communist Party	179,894	23.3	▼1.6	13	▼7	Seats by party — Seats by coalition
Italian Socialist Party	109,097	14.1	▼22.1	8	▼7	Seats by party — Seats by coalition
Others (civic list)	2,805	0.4	▼1.2	0	▼1	Seats by party — Seats by coalition
Italian Social Movement	50,454	6.5	▲6.5	4	▲4	Seats by party — Seats by coalition
Monarchist National Party	23,956	3.0	▲3.0	2	▲2	Seats by party — Seats by coalition
Total	778,452	100.0	=	80	=	Seats by party — Seats by coalition

Sunday 27 May 1951. Sources: La Stampa , Unimi

=== City Council election, 1956 ===
The election took place on 27 May 1956.

For this election there was a different electoral system: after Alcide De Gasperi's government had retired in 1953 the 1951-electoral law based on a block voting system, the previous electoral law was restored.

Christian Democracy obtained the 30% of suffrages, while the Socialist Party came second with the 20% of the votes, gaining 6% more than the 1951 election. Virgilio Ferrari was confirmed Mayor by the majority of the City Council.

Parties		Votes	%	+/-	Seats	+/-
Christian Democracy	DC	261,610	30.1	▼0.7	25	▼5
Italian Socialist Party	PSI	173,813	20.1	▲6.0	16	▲8
Italian Communist Party	PCI	158,818	18.3	▼5.0	15	▲2
Italian Democratic Socialist Party	PSDI	103,175	11.9	▼2.4	10	▼5
Italian Liberal Party	PLI	53,501	6.3	▼0.1	5	▼1
Italian Social Movement	MSI	50,827	5.9	▼0.6	4	Steady
Monarchist National Party	PNM	35,171	4.1	▲1.1	3	▲1
Italian Republican Party	PRI	13,407	1.2	▼0.5	0	▼2
Others (civc list)		15,721	2.0	▲1.6	2	▲2
Total		866,043	100.0	=	80	=

Sunday 27 May 1956. Source: La Stampa

=== City Council election, 1960 ===
The election took place on 6 November 1960.

This election was anticipated by the effect of a new law which ordered a new 4 years-term legislature.

Christian Democracy came again first with the 29% of suffrages. Gino Cassinis (PSDI) was elected Mayor by a large majority in the City Council. For the first time in ten years the Socialist Party entered again in the executive board of the city and a centre-left alliance was formed.

Parties		Votes	%	+/-	Seats	+/-
Christian Democracy	DC	288,030	29.9	▼0.3	25	Steady
Italian Socialist Party	PSI	199,728	20.7	▲0.6	17	▲1
Italian Communist Party	PCI	195,521	20.3	▲2.0	17	▲2
Italian Democratic Socialist Party	PSDI	101,703	10.5	▼1.4	8	▼2
Italian Liberal Party	PLI	78,488	8.4	▲2.2	6	▲1
Italian Social Movement	MSI	63,156	6.5	▲0.6	5	▲1
Italian Democratic Party of Monarchist Unity	PDIUM	24,858	2.3	▼1.8	2	▼1
Italian Republican Party	PRI	10,201	1.1	▼0.1	0	Steady
Others (civc list)		2,513	0.3	▼1.7	0	▼2
Total		964,198	100.0	=	80	=

Sunday 6 November 1960. Source: La Stampa

=== City Council election, 1964 ===
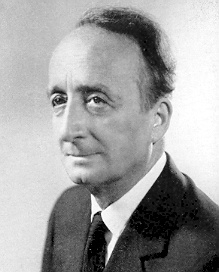
Pietro Bucalossi lead a centre-left executive as Mayor (1964–1967)

The election took place on 22 November 1964.

The election was characterized by the incredible surge of the centre-right Liberal Party, which obtained more than 21% of votes and managed to become for the first time the third party in a milanese municipal election. This exceptional growth of the liberals – and the contemporary defeat of the Socialist Party – can be explained by the poor economic results of the first centre-left national government and by the ability of the liberal leader Giovanni Malagodi to draw some votes from the Italian Social Movement, the Monarchist Party and especially Christian Democracy, whose electoral base was composed also by conservatives suspicious of the Socialists. Christian Democracy itself obtained just the 24% of suffrages, suffering a notable loss from the previous election.

Despite the huge loss by the left-wing parties, a center-left coalition was formed again and Pietro Bucalossi (PSDI), who succeeded Cassinis in February 1964, was confirmed Mayor by the majority of the City Council.

Parties		Votes	%	+/-	Seats	+/-
Christian Democracy	DC	257,653	24.0	▼5.8	20	▼5
Italian Communist Party	PCI	236,013	21.9	▲1.6	18	▲1
Italian Liberal Party	PLI	226,895	21.1	▲13.0	17	▲11
Italian Socialist Party	PSI	171,334	15.9	▼4.8	13	▼4
Italian Democratic Socialist Party	PSDI	90,790	8.4	▼2.1	7	▼1
Italian Social Movement	MSI	54,011	5.0	▼1.5	4	▼1
Italian Socialist Party of Proletarian Unity	PSIUP	22,022	2.0	▲2.0	1	▲1
Italian Democratic Party of Monarchist Unity	PDIUM	10,000	0.9	▼1.4	0	▼2
Others (civc list)		6,613	0.6	▲0.3	0	Steady
Total		1,075,381	100.0	=	80	=

Sunday 22 November 1964. Source: La Stampa

=== City Council election, 1970 ===
The election took place on 7 June 1970.

This election took place after six years from the last and simultaneously with the first regional elections of Lombardy.

Christian Democracy obtained the 26% of suffrages, while the Italian Communist Party came second with the 22% of the votes. However in 1967 the socialists had already been able to impose their own candidate for Mayor, succeeding in having elected Aldo Aniasi at the head of a centre-left coalition. After the municipal election, Aniasi was elected Mayor again by the majority of the City Council.

Parties		Votes	%	+/-	Seats	+/-
Christian Democracy	DC	291,902	26.3	▲2.3	22	▲2
Italian Communist Party	PCI	254,069	22.8	▲0.9	19	▲1
Italian Socialist Party	PSI	157,200	14.1	▼1.8	12	▼1
Italian Liberal Party	PLI	123,082	11.1	▼10.0	9	▼8
Italian Democratic Socialist Party	PSDI	116,202	10.4	▲2.0	8	▲1
Italian Social Movement	MSI	74,395	6.7	▲1.7	4	Steady
Italian Republican Party	PRI	53,745	4.8	▲4.8	4	▲4
Italian Socialist Party of Proletarian Unity	PSIUP	33,216	3.0	▲1.0	2	▲1
Italian Democratic Party of Monarchist Unity	PDIUM	8,009	0.7	▼0.2	0	Steady
Total		1,111,731	100.0	=	80	=

Sunday 7 June 1970. Source: La Stampa

=== City Council election, 1975 ===
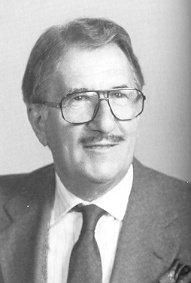
Aldo Aniasi lead two centre-left executives and the very first left-wing executive as Mayor (1967–1976)

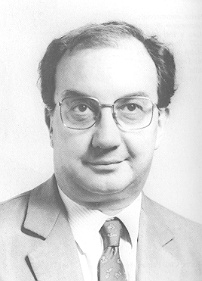
Carlo Tognoli lead two left-wing executives as Mayor (1976–1986)

The election took place on 15 June 1975.

Similarly to the national vote, the Italian Communist Party became for the first time in history the first party with the 30% of the votes. This extraordinary result led to the birth of the first red-giunta in the history of the city: the new coalition was formed by the leftist Socialist and Communist Party, while Aldo Aniasi was reconfirmed Mayor. In 1976, after Aniasi's resignation, the socialist Carlo Tognoli was elected Mayor.

A notable fact in the election was the surge of the post-fascist Italian Social Movement, which became the fourth party with the 7% of the votes.

Parties		Votes	%	+/-	Seats	+/-
Italian Communist Party	PCI	354,603	30.4	▲7.6	25	▲6
Christian Democracy	DC	313,855	26.9	▲0.6	22	Steady
Italian Socialist Party	PSI	172,558	14.8	▲0.7	12	Steady
Italian Social Movement	MSI	84,087	7.2	▲0.5	6	▲2
Italian Democratic Socialist Party	PSDI	73,889	6.3	▼4.1	5	▼3
Italian Republican Party	PRI	70,050	6.0	▲1.2	4	Steady
Italian Liberal Party	PLI	53,617	4.6	▼7.1	3	▼6
Proletarian Democracy	DP	43,524	3.7	▲3.7	3	▲3
Total		1,166,183	100.0	=	80	=

Sunday 15 June 1975. Source: La Stampa

=== City Council election, 1980 ===
The election took place on 8 June 1980.

For the second time the Italian Communist Party was the first party with the 26% of the votes.

Parties		Votes	%	+/-	Seats	+/-
Italian Communist Party	PCI	284,329	26.5	▼3.9	22	▼3
Christian Democracy	DC	283,428	26.4	▼0.5	22	Steady
Italian Socialist Party	PSI	210,504	19.6	▲4.9	16	▲4
Italian Social Movement	MSI	70,767	6.6	▼0.6	5	▼1
Italian Liberal Party	PLI	65,428	6.1	▲1.5	5	▲2
Italian Democratic Socialist Party	PSDI	53,036	4.9	▼1.4	4	▼1
Italian Republican Party	PRI	47,522	4.4	▼1.6	3	▼1
Proletarian Democracy	DP	29,209	2.7	▼1.0	2	▼1
Proletarian Party for the Communism	PPC	16,395	1.5	▲1.5	1	▲1
Total		1,071,883	100.0	=	80	=

Sunday 8 June 1980. Source: La Stampa

=== City Council election, 1985 ===
The election took place on 12 May 1985.

Another time the Italian Communist Party was narrowly confirmed as the first party in the city with the 24% of the votes. Despite it came first, the Communist Party didn't have enough seats in the City Council to confirm again a left-wing with the Socialist Party, which instead decided to form a new centre-left majority with the Christian Democracy and other small centrist parties.

Carlo Tognoli was reconfirmed Mayor, but resigned in December 1986.

Parties		Votes	%	+/-	Seats	+/-
Italian Communist Party	PCI	266,259	24.9	▼1.6	21	▼1
Christian Democracy	DC	256,455	24.0	▼2.4	20	▼2
Italian Socialist Party	PSI	211,372	19.8	▲0.2	16	Steady
Italian Republican Party	PRI	105,796	9.9	▲5.5	8	▲5
Italian Social Movement	MSI	81,873	7.7	▲1.1	6	▲1
Italian Liberal Party	PLI	37,662	3.5	▼2.6	3	▼2
Proletarian Democracy	DP	34,329	3.2	▲0.5	2	Steady
Italian Democratic Socialist Party	PSDI	31,811	3.0	▼1.9	2	▼2
Federation of Green Lists		27,533	2.6	▲2.6	2	▲2
Others		14,867	1.4	▲1.4	0	Steady
Total		1,067,957	100.0	=	80	=

Sunday 12 May 1985. Source: La Stampa

=== City Council election, 1990 ===
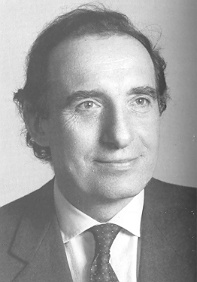
Paolo Pillitteri lead some executives as Mayor (1986–1992), swinging between a centre-left and a left-wing majority

The election took place on 6 May 1990.

The election was characterized by a huge level of political fragmentation. Traditional parties suffered some considerable losses, while new-born movements gained some seats in the City Council and made very difficult the possibility to form a stable coalition to govern the city.

The newborn regionalist Northern League became the fourth party with the 13% of the votes.

Parties		Votes	%	+/-	Seats	+/-
Christian Democracy	DC	204,954	20.7	▼3.3	17	▼4
Italian Communist Party	PCI	194,264	19.6	▼5.0	16	▼5
Italian Socialist Party	PSI	192,145	19.4	▼0.4	16	Steady
Northern League	LN	128,312	13.0	▲13.0	11	▲11
Italian Republican Party	PRI	58,377	5.9	▼4.0	5	▼3
Federation of Green Lists		41,986	4.2	▲1.6	3	▲1
Italian Social Movement	MSI	36,610	3.7	▼4.0	3	▼3
Pensioners' Party	PP	34,963	3.5	▲3.5	3	▲3
Italian Liberal Party	PLI	26,401	2.7	▼0.8	2	▼1
Rainbow Greens	VA	19,951	2.0	▲2.0	1	▲1
Italian Democratic Socialist Party	PSDI	16,352	1.6	▼1.4	1	▼1
Proletarian Democracy	DP	16,051	1.6	▼1.6	1	▼1
Antiprohibitionists on Drugs		15,351	1.5	▲1.5	1	▲1
Others		5,283	0.5	▼0.9	0	Steady
Total		990,097	100.0	=	80	=

Sunday 6 May 1990. Source: La Stampa
