= Greppi =

Greppi is an Italian surname. Notable people with the surname include:

- Antonio Greppi (writer) (1894–1982), Italian writer, politician and dramaturge
- Antonio Greppi (1722–1799), Italian banker, merchant, politician and diplomat
- Cristoforo Greppi, Italian Mannerist painter
- Emanuele Greppi (1853–1931), Italian lawyer and politician
- Giovanni Greppi (1884–1960), architect
- Giovanni Greppi (1910–?), Italian footballer
- Milena Greppi (1929–2016), Italian hurdler
