= Paolo G. Casali =

Italian oncologist

Paolo Giovanni Casali is an Italian oncologist who served as chair of the European Society for Medical Oncology public policy committee, and is head of the Adult Mesenchymal Tumour Medical Oncology Unit at Istituto Nazionale dei Tumori in Milan.
