= Gian Giacomo Gallarati Scotti =

Italian politician

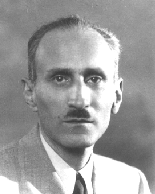
Gian Giacomo Gallarati Scotti

Gian Giacomo Gallarati Scotti (2 September 1886 – 4 January 1983) was an Italian politician who served as the fifth podestà of Milan from 1938 to 1943. He was a recipient of the Order of Saints Maurice and Lazarus. Scotti turned over his position to Giorgio Boltraffio, the prefectural commissioner, on 14 August 1943, until Piero Parini was appointed podestà on 14 October.

Political offices
Preceded by Guido Pesenti	podestà of Milan; 1938–1943	Succeeded by Giorgio Boltraffio as commissario prefettizio
