= Scuola Superiore d'Arte Applicata del Castello Sforzesco =

Higher education academy in Milan, Italy

Location
- Via Visconti 18; Milan; Italy
- Coordinates: 45°30′14″N 9°05′57″E

Information
- Other name: SUPER
- School type: Post-secondary institution
- Founded: 1882; 143 years ago
- Founder: Antonio Beretta
- Website: scuolaarteapplicata.it

The Scuola Superiore d'Arte Applicata all'Industria del Castello Sforzesco or SUPER is a vocational school in Milan, in Lombardy in northern Italy, established on 2 July 1882. It combines the preservation of traditional techniques with the exploration of new disciplines in the field of applied arts.

== History and organization ==
The school was founded in 1882 at the suggestion of the Italian Industrial Association, specifically by Cavaliere Antonio Beretta, and designed by architect Carlo Maciachini and painter Luigi Cavenaghi, with patronage from the Municipality of Milan and Milan's Chamber of commerce.

Over the course of its history, the academia has progressively updated its curriculum, introducing new craft disciplines and adapting its courses to changes in the labour market and technological advancements. More recently, courses and events have been implemented to support the launch and development of students' artistic careers.

The school's curriculum encompasses a range of art, craft and digital disciplines, including: comics, digital art, fresco, publishing, graphic design, illustration, letterpress printing, mosaic, painting, printmaking, social media (with a focus on its application within the artistic and cultural fields), stained glass, tapestry and woodworking.

Currently shares premises in via Alex Visconti with Scuola Cova.

== Locations ==
=== 1882–1905 ===
Pavilion in the Giardini Pubblici Indro Montanelli (Public Gardens of Porta Venezia) housing the Museum of Industrial Art. Now occupied by the Museo Civico di Storia Naturale di Milano.

=== 1906–1999 ===
Sforza Castle. Since July 15, 1906, following the restoration by Luca Beltrami, it has housed part of the Applied Arts Collections of the Civic Museums of the Sforza Castle.

=== Present ===
Campus Visconti, in Milan. Building shared with Scuola Cova.

Campus Giusti, in Milan. Building shared with Arte&Messaggio.

== Headmasters ==
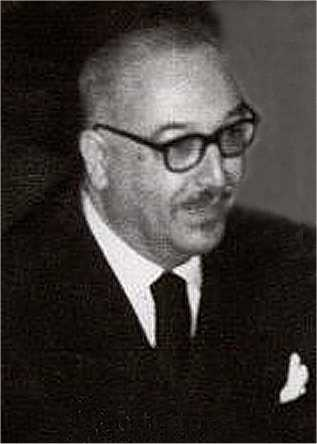
Architect Giuseppe Boattini (1893–1967) Director from 1946 to 1965

- Luigi Cavenaghi (1882–1918)
- Alfredo Melani (1898–1923)
- Esodo Pratelli (1924–1945)
- Giuseppe Boattini (1946–1965)
- Carlo Paganini (1978–1993)
- Luigi Timoncini (1994–2003)
- Pietro Nimis (2004–2017)
- Stefano Mirti (2017–2024)
- Andrea Lazzaroni (from 2024)
