= Gino Cassinis =

Italian politician (1885–1964)

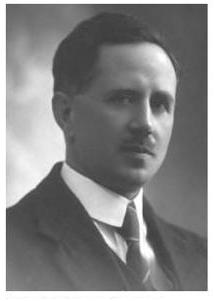
Gino Cassinis

Gino Cassinis (27 January 1885, Milan – 13 January 1964) was an Italian politician who served as the Mayor of Milan from 1961 until his death in 1964. He was knight grand cross and grand officer of the Order of Merit of the Italian Republic.

Political offices
Preceded by Virgilio Ferrari	Mayor of Milan; 1961–1964	Succeeded by Pietro Bucalossi
