= Ernesto Teodoro Moneta =

Italian journalist, nationalist, pacifist

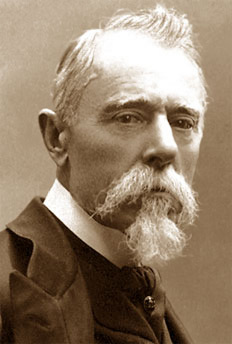
- Moneta in 1907
- Born: 20 September 1833; Milan, Lombardy–Venetia, Austrian Empire
- Died: 10 February 1918 (aged 84); Milan, Lombardy, Kingdom of Italy
- Occupations: Journalist; nationalist; pacifist
- Awards: Nobel Peace Prize (1907)

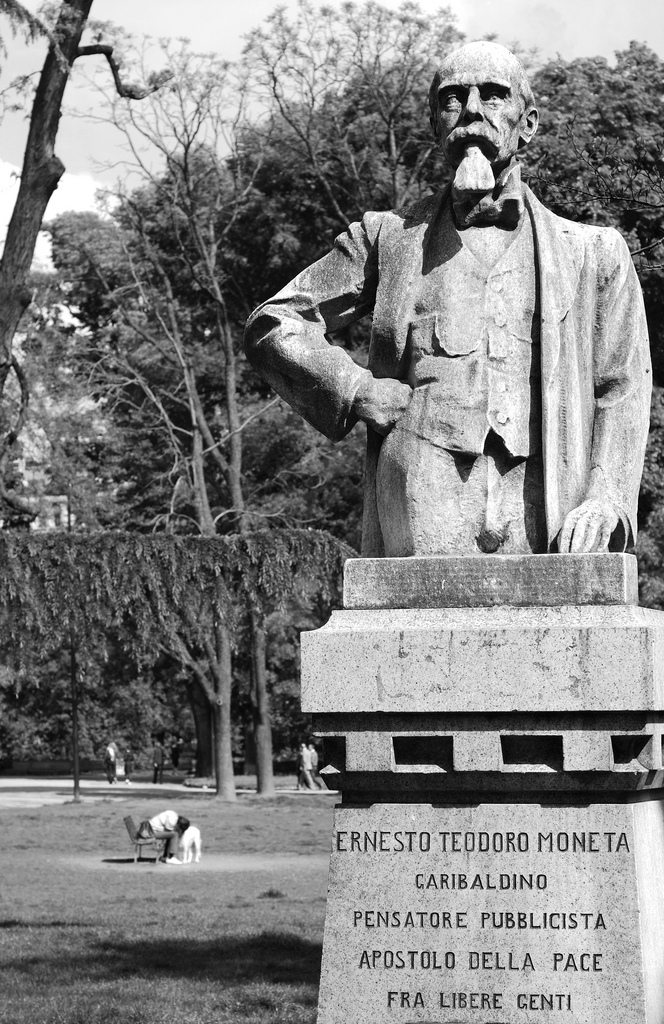
The monument to Moneta in the Porta Venezia Gardens, in Milan. The carving reads: "Ernesto Teodoro Moneta, garibaldine, thinker, journalist, apostle of peace among free people"

Ernesto Teodoro Moneta (Italian: [erˈnɛsto teoˈdɔːro moˈneːta]; September 20, 1833 – February 10, 1918) was an Italian journalist, nationalist, revolutionary soldier and later a pacifist and Nobel Peace Prize Laureate. He adopted the motto In varietate unitas! which later inspired the motto of the European Union.

At age 15, Moneta participated in the Five Days of Milan (1848 uprising against Austrian rule). He later attended the military academy in Ivrea. In 1859 he joined Garibaldi's Expedition of the Thousand, and also fought in the ranks of the Italian army against the Austrians in 1866.

Subsequently, he became an international peace activist.

Between 1867 and 1896 he was editor of the Milan democratic paper Il Secolo, published by Edoardo Sonzogno.

In 1890 he founded the Lombard Association for Peace and Arbitration (Unione Lombarda per la Pace e l'Arbitrato), which called for disarmament and envisaged the creation of a League of Nations and Permanent Court of Arbitration. He won (with Louis Renault) the Nobel Peace Prize in 1907.
