= Bassano Gabba =

Italian lawyer and politician

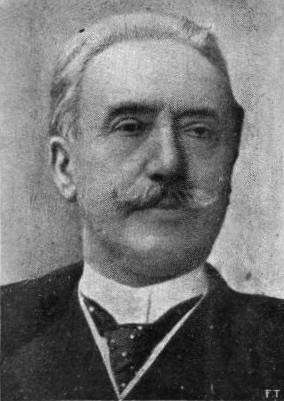

Bassano Gabba (12 September 1844, Milan – 4 November 1928) was an Italian lawyer and politician who served as the Mayor of Milan from 1909 to 1910. He served in the Chamber of Deputies and Senate of the Kingdom of Italy.

Political offices
Preceded by Ettore Ponti	Mayor of Milan; 1909–1910	Succeeded by Emanuele Greppi
