= Carlo Villa =

Carlo Villa may refer to:

- Carlo Villa (footballer) (1912–?), Italian footballer
- Carlo Villa (mayor) (1766–1846), mayor of Milan
