= Louis Renault =

Louis Renault may refer to:

- Louis Renault (jurist) (1843–1918), French jurist and educator, recipient of the Nobel Prize for Peace
- Louis Renault (industrialist) (1877–1944), French industrialist and pioneer of the automobile industry
- Captain Louis Renault, a character from the film Casablanca
