= Mayor of Milan =

- Sindaco di Milano; Sindech de Milan

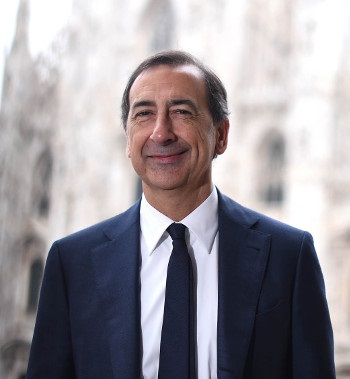
- Incumbent; Giuseppe Sala since 21 June 2016
- Seat: Palazzo Marino
- Appointer: Electorate of Milan
- Term length: 5 years, renewable once
- Inaugural holder: Antonio Durini
- Formation: 8 November 1807
- Deputy: Anna Scavuzzo
- Salary: €7,800 monthly

The mayor of Milan (Italian: sindaco di Milano; Lombard: sindech de Milan) is the first citizen and head of the municipal government of the city of Milan in Lombardy, Italy. The incumbent mayor is Giuseppe Sala, a centre-left independent who won the 2016 Milan municipal election, leading a progressive alliance composed of the Democratic Party, Green Europe, and some civic lists. He won a second term after the 2021 Milan municipal election.

== Overview ==
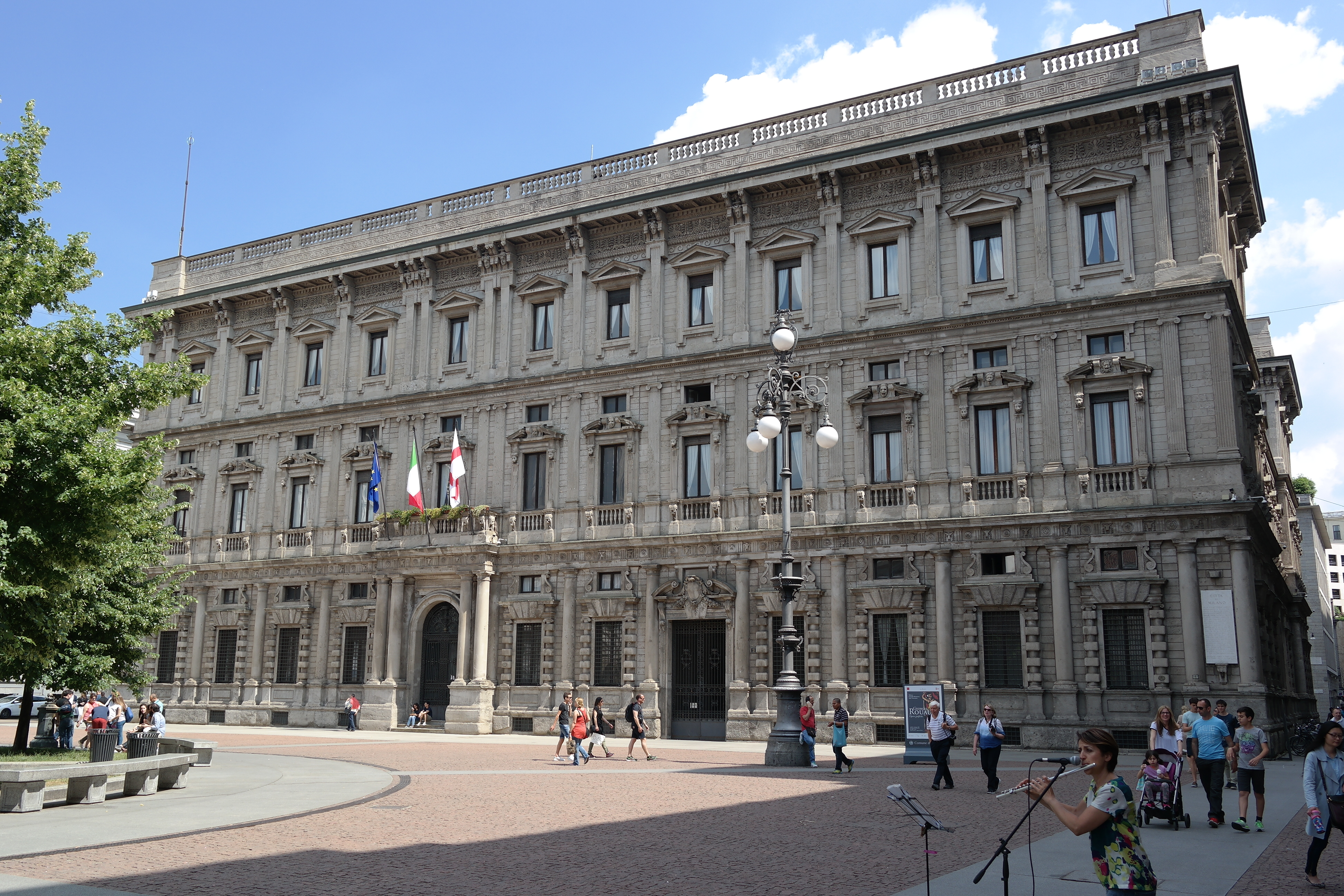
Milan's City Hall, Palazzo Marino

According to the Italian Constitution, the mayor of Milan is a member of the City Council of Milan. The mayor and the other 48 city councillors (consiglieri comunali) are elected by the Italian and European Union citizens residing in Milan. Concurrently, albeit with a different ballot paper, nine presidents and 270 councillors are chosen for the nine assemblies of the nine municipalities of Milan, often referred to as zones, in which the city is divided, each one having one president and 30 councillors. All the offices are elected for five-year terms. The official seat of the mayor and of the City Council is Milan's City Hall, Palazzo Marino, in Piazza della Scala (Zone 1 of Milan). Each municipality has its own official seat within its respective territory. After the election, the mayor can appoint one vice mayor (Anna Scavuzzo is the incumbent) and up to 16 assessors.

The mayor, vice mayor, and assessors form the municipal government (giunta comunale) and they implement the municipal policies, which are determined and controlled by the City Council. The City Council has also the power to dismiss the mayor or any of the assessors with a motion of no confidence. Similar procedures take place at the municipality level, where the mayor is called the president of the municipality (presidente del municipio) and there are three assessors. Since 1993, Italian mayors of municipalities of more than 15,000 inhabitants have been directly elected by their respective electorates. Voters can express their choice for the mayor and for a list of municipal councillors not necessarily supporting the same mayor-candidate (voto disgiunto). If no mayor-candidate receives a majority of votes, a run-off election is held two weeks later among the top two candidates. In the list choice, each voter can express one or two preferences for councillor candidates; in the case of two preferences, their gender must be different. The party and civic lists supporting the elected mayor are granted a majority of the City Council seats, divided proportionally to each list result, by means of a majority bonus; the remaining seats are then assigned proportionally to the opposition lists.

== List ==
=== Rectors ===
	Rector	Term start	Term end	Appointer
1	Antonio Durini	30 November 1807	22 October 1814	Napoleon I of France
2	Cesare Giulini Della Porta	22 October 1814	2 January 1820	Francis I of Austria
3	Carlo Villa	2 January 1820	7 August 1827	Francis I of Austria
(1)	Antonio Durini	7 August 1827	2 January 1837	Francis I of Austria
4	Gabrio Casati	2 January 1837	3 August 1848	Ferdinand I of Austria
5	Franz Graf von Wimpffen	3 August 1848	6 January 1849	Franz Joseph I of Austria
6	Antonio Pestalozza	6 January 1849	27 November 1856	Franz Joseph I of Austria
7	Giuseppe Sebregondi	27 November 1856	10 June 1859	Franz Joseph I of Austria
8	Luigi Barbiano di Belgioioso	10 June 1859	26 January 1860	Victor Emmanuel II of Italy

=== Kingdom of Italy (1860–1946) ===
	Mayor	Term start	Term end	Party
1	Antonio Beretta (1808–1891)	26 January 1860	13 February 1867	Right
2	Giulio Belinzaghi (1818–1892)	13 February 1867	25 April 1884	Right
3	Gaetano Negri (1838–1902)	25 April 1884	21 November 1889	Right
(2)	Giulio Belinzaghi (1818–1892)	21 November 1889	28 September 1892	Right
4	Giuseppe Vigoni (1846–1914)	28 September 1892	18 September 1899	Right
5	Giuseppe Mussi (1836–1904)	18 September 1899	16 September 1903	Left
6	Giovanni Battista Barinetti (1849–1942)	16 September 1903	7 February 1905	Left
7	Ettore Ponti (1855–1919)	7 February 1905	11 May 1909	Right
8	Bassano Gabba (1844–1928)	11 May 1909	30 January 1911	Right
9	Emanuele Greppi (1853–1931)	30 January 1911	30 June 1914	Liberal
10	Emilio Caldara (1868–1942)	30 June 1914	20 November 1920	PSI
11	Angelo Filippetti (1866–1936)	20 November 1920	30 December 1922	PSI
12	Luigi Mangiagalli (1850–1928)	30 December 1922	19 August 1926	PLI
Fascist Podestà (1926–1945)
1	Ernesto Belloni (1883–1938)	19 August 1926	6 September 1928	PNF
2	Giuseppe De Capitani D'Arzago (1870–1945)	6 September 1928	20 November 1929	PNF
3	Marcello Visconti di Modrone (1898–1964)	20 November 1929	19 November 1935	PNF
4	Guido Pesenti (1884–1962)	19 November 1935	13 June 1938	PNF
5	Gian Giacomo Gallarati Scotti (1886–1983)	13 June 1938	14 August 1943	PNF
6	Piero Parini (1894–1993)	14 October 1943	4 May 1944	PFR
7	Guido Andreoni	4 May 1944	13 September 1944	PFR
8	Giuseppe Spinelli (1908–1987)	13 September 1944	23 January 1945	PFR
9	Mario Colombo	23 January 1945	25 April 1945	PFR
Liberation (1945-1946)
13	Antonio Greppi (1894–1982)	25 April 1945	7 April 1946	PSI

=== Italian Republic (1946–present) ===
==== City Council election (1946–1993) ====
From 1946 to 1993, the mayor was chosen by the City Council of Milan.

	Mayor	Term start	Term end	Party	Coalition	Election
1	Antonio Greppi (1894–1982)	7 April 1946	28 March 1949	PSI	PSI • PCI • DC	1946
1	Antonio Greppi (1894–1982)	28 March 1949	25 June 1951	PSI	PSI • PRI • PSLI	1946
2	Virgilio Ferrari (1888–1975)	25 June 1951	10 September 1956	PSDI	DC • PSDI • PRI • PLI	1951
2	Virgilio Ferrari (1888–1975)	10 September 1956	21 January 1961	PSDI	DC • PSDI	1956
3	Gino Cassinis (1885–1964)	21 January 1961	13 January 1964 (Note: Died in office)	PSDI	DC • PSDI • PSI	1960
4	Pietro Bucalossi (1905–1992)	17 February 1964	22 January 1965	PSDI	DC • PSDI • PSI	1960
4	Pietro Bucalossi (1905–1992)	22 January 1965	13 December 1967	PSDI	DC • PSDI • PSI	1964
5	Aldo Aniasi (1921–2005)	13 December 1967	30 July 1970	PSI	DC • PSDI • PSI	1964
5	Aldo Aniasi (1921–2005)	30 July 1970	31 July 1975	PSI	DC • PSI • PSDI • PRI	1970
5	Aldo Aniasi (1921–2005)	31 July 1975	12 May 1976	PSI	PCI • PSI	1975
6	Carlo Tognoli (1938–2021)	12 May 1976	7 February 1977	PSI	PCI • PSI	1975
6	Carlo Tognoli (1938–2021)	7 February 1977	31 July 1980	PSI	PCI • PSI • PSDI	1975
6	Carlo Tognoli (1938–2021)	31 July 1980	5 August 1985	PSI	PCI • PSI • PSDI	1980
6	Carlo Tognoli (1938–2021)	5 August 1985	21 December 1986	PSI	DC • PSI • PRI • PSDI • PLI	1985
7	Paolo Pillitteri (1940–2024)	21 December 1986	8 January 1988	PSI	DC • PSI • PRI • PSDI • PLI	1985
7	Paolo Pillitteri (1940–2024)	8 January 1988	3 August 1990	PSI	PCI • PSI • PSDI • FLV	1985
7	Paolo Pillitteri (1940–2024)	3 August 1990	18 January 1992	PSI	PCI • PSI • PRI • FdV	1990
8	Giampiero Borghini (b. 1943)	18 January 1992	11 March 1993	PSI	DC • PSI • PSDI • PLI	1990
-	Claudio Gelati	11 March 1993	21 June 1993	—	Special prefectural commissioner (Note: Nominated by the prefect after the mayor and the members of the city council resigned in order to hold a new election under the provision of the new local electoral law)	

==== Direct election (since 1993) ====
Since 1993, under provisions of new local administration law, the mayor of Milan is chosen by direct election, originally every four, and since 2001 every five years.

	Mayor of Milan	Took office	Left office	Party	Coalition	Election
9	Marco Formentini (1930–2021)	21 June 1993	12 May 1997	LN	LN	1993
10	Gabriele Albertini (b. 1950)	12 May 1997	14 May 2001	FI	Pole for Freedoms (FI-AN-CCD)	1997
10	Gabriele Albertini (b. 1950)	14 May 2001	1 June 2006	FI	House of Freedoms (FI-AN-LN-UDC)	2001
11	Letizia Moratti (b. 1949)	1 June 2006	1 June 2011	FI	House of Freedoms (FI-AN-LN-UDC)	2006
12	Giuliano Pisapia (b. 1949)	1 June 2011	21 June 2016	Ind (Note: Close to Left Ecology Freedom (SEL))	PD • SEL • FdS • RI	2011
13	Giuseppe Sala (b. 1958)	21 June 2016	6 October 2021	Ind (Note: Close to the Democratic Party (PD), he joined the European Green Party (EGP) on 12 March 2021.)	PD • SI	2016
13	Giuseppe Sala (b. 1958)	6 October 2021 (Note: Election originally scheduled for June 2021 and then postponed due to the COVID-19 pandemic in Italy)	In office	Ind	PD • EV • IV • A	2021

==== By time in office ====
Rank	Mayor	Political Party	Total time in office	Terms
1	Carlo Tognoli	PSI	10 years, 223 days	3
2	Giuseppe Sala	Ind	10 years, 78 days	2
3	Virgilio Ferrari	PSDI	9 years, 210 days	2
4	Gabriele Albertini	FI	9 years, 20 days	2
5	Aldo Aniasi	PSI	8 years, 151 days	3
6	Antonio Greppi	PSI	5 years, 79 days	1
7	Paolo Pillitteri	PSI	5 years, 28 days	2
8	Giuliano Pisapia	Ind	5 years, 20 days	1
9	Letizia Moratti	FI	5 years, 0 days	1
10	Marco Formentini	LN	3 years, 325 days	1
11	Pietro Bucalossi	PSDI	3 years, 299 days	1
12	Gino Cassinis	PSDI	3 years, 27 days	1
13	Giampiero Borghini	PSI	1 year, 52 days	1

== Deputy mayor ==
The office of the deputy mayor of Milan was officially created in 1993 with the adoption of the new local administration law. The deputy mayor is nominated and eventually dismissed by the mayor.

	Deputy	Term start	Term end	Party	Mayor
1	Marisa Bedoni	24 June 1993	22 April 1994 (Note: Resigned after being elected in the Senate.)	LN	Formentini
2	Giorgio Malagoli	22 April 1994	12 May 1997	Ind	Formentini
3	Riccardo De Corato	21 May 1997	14 May 2001	AN	Albertini
3	Riccardo De Corato	21 May 2001	1 June 2006	AN	Albertini
3	Riccardo De Corato	20 June 2006	1 June 2011	AN	Moratti
4	Maria Grazia Guida	10 June 2011	21 January 2013 (Note: Resigned)	PD	Pisapia
5	Ada Lucia De Cesaris	28 January 2013	15 July 2015 (Note: Resigned)	PD	Pisapia
6	Francesca Balzani	17 July 2015	21 June 2016	PD	Pisapia
7	Anna Scavuzzo	29 June 2016	6 October 2021	PD	Sala
7	Anna Scavuzzo	13 October 2021	Incumbent	PD	Sala

== See also ==
- Rulers of Milan
- Timeline of Milan
