= Pillitteri =

Pillitteri is an Italian surname. Notable people with the surname include:

- Gary Pillitteri (born 1936), Canadian politician
- Paolo Pillitteri (1940–2024), Italian politician and film critic
