= Palazzo Dugnani =

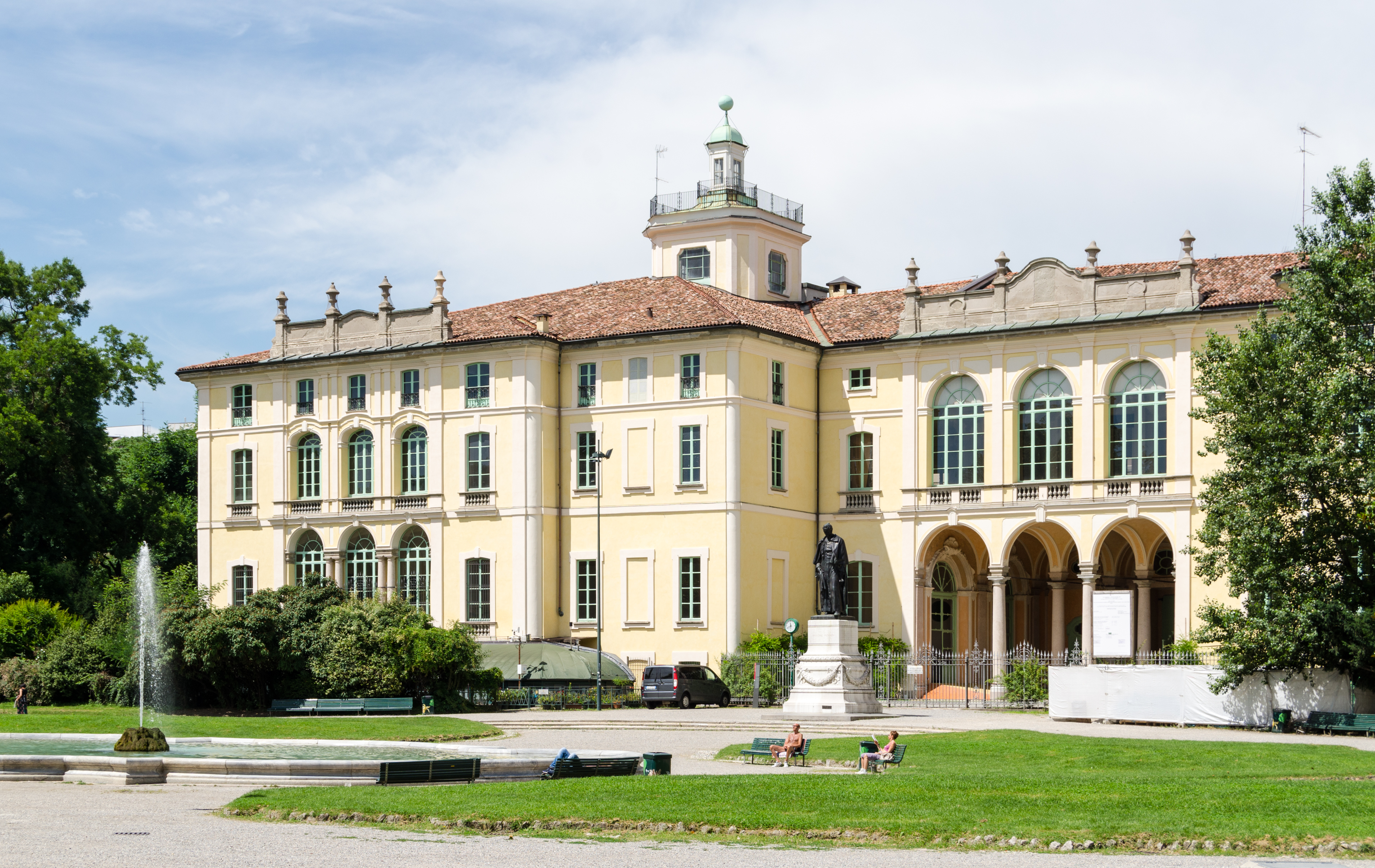
- Garden facade of Palazzo Dugnani
- Click on the map for a fullscreen view

General information
- Architectural style: Baroque
- Location: Milan, Italy
- Coordinates: 45.47450°N 9.19668°E

Palazzo Dugnani or Palazzo Casati Dugnani is a Baroque-style monumental palace located on Via Daniele Marin #2, near Porta Venezia in Milan, region of Lombardy, Italy. The rear of the palace faces the street, while the facade faces the western edge of the Giardini Indro Montanelli. The palace is notable for its salon frescoed by Giovanni Battista Tiepolo.

== History ==
Until the 1730, the site housed the palace of the Cavalchini family, who then sold it to the Casati family who began the construction of the larger palace we see today. In 1753, the palace was sold to the Dugnani family. The palace was known during the following decades as the home of literary salons, and the home since 1762 for the amateur society, known as the Accademia dei Fenici. In 1835. with the death of Teresa Dugnani Viani, the property was inherited by Count Giovanni Vimercati. In 1837, he installed his collection of flora and fauna specimens as a "Natural History Museum". In 1846 Vimercati sold the building and collections to the Municipality of Milan. The collections are now stored in the nearby Civic Museum of Natural History also along the gardens of this palace on Corso Venezia. The palace became utilized for a public school, and now is used for a variety of exhibitions including a Cinema Museum.

== Architecture and decoration ==
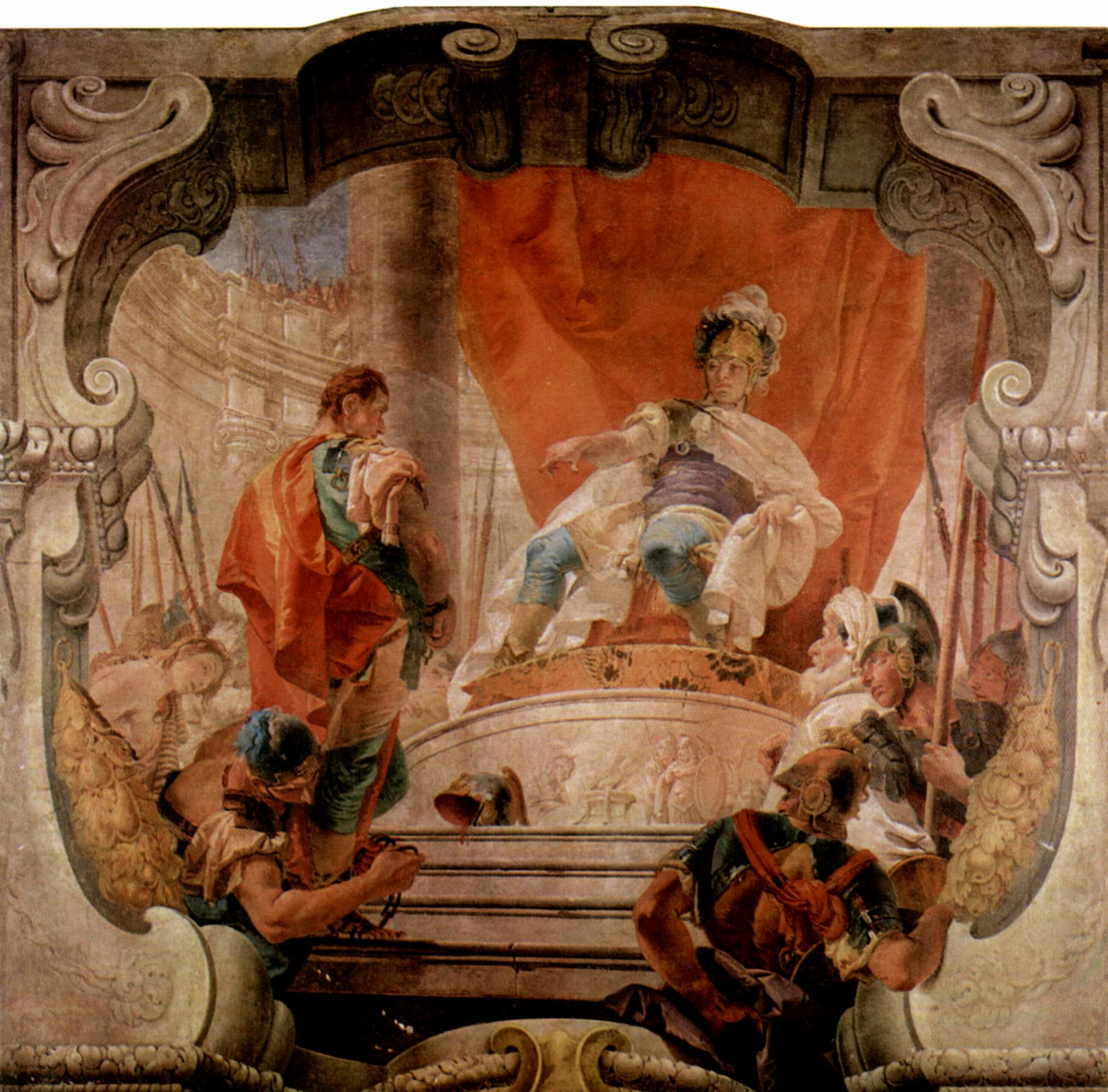
Clemency of Scipio fresco in main hall

Circa 1731, Count Giuseppe Casati (1673-1740) had commissioned frescoes from Tiepolo, then working on Palazzo Archinto. The Count also engaged the services of Cucchi, Magatti, Bortoloni, Ferdinando Porta to work along and under Tiepolo. The frescoes are putatively events related to the History of Scipio Africanus as recounted by Livy. The scenes are depicted with colorful by fanciful wardrobes. The central panel depicts his Apotheosis (central ceiling). Side panels include the death of the Carthaginian Sophonisba by poison; Scipio allies himself with the Numidian Masinissa; and Scipio (or Hasdrubal) before the Ruins of Cirta. Finally one fresco depicts the often depicted Clemency of Scipio.
