= Giuseppe Mussi =

Italian politician (1836–1904)

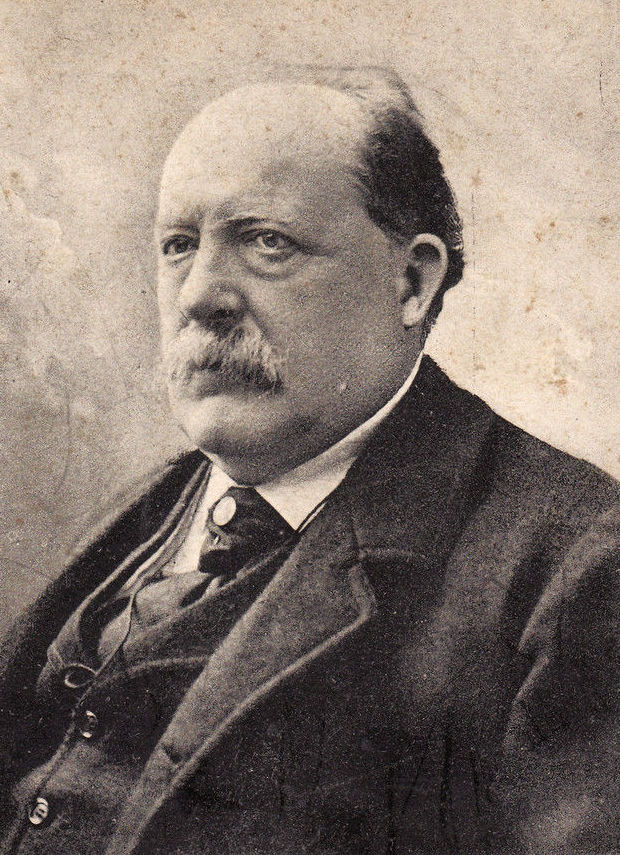

Member of the Senate of the Kingdom
- Life tenure 21 November 1901 – 18 August 1904
- Monarch: Victor Emmanuel III

Mayor of Milan
- In office 18 December 1899 – 16 December 1903
- Preceded by: Giuseppe Vigoni
- Succeeded by: Giovanni Battista Barinetti

Personal details
- Born: 2 January 1836 Milan, Austrian Empire
- Died: 18 August 1904 (aged 68) Baveno, Italy
- Party: Italian Radical Party

Giuseppe Mussi (2 January 1836 – 18 August 1904) was an Italian politician. He was twice mayor of Corbetta, Lombardy as well as mayor of Milan from 18 December 1899 to 16 December 1903. Mussi was made a senator of the Kingdom of Italy on 21 November 1901. He was a recipient of the Order of Saints Maurice and Lazarus.

Political offices
Preceded by Giuseppe Carones	Mayor of Corbetta; 1864–1868	Succeeded by Francesco Bruni
Preceded by Francesco Bruni	Mayor of Corbetta; 1879–1886	Succeeded by Giovanni Olivares
Preceded by Giuseppe Vigoni	Mayor of Milan; 1899–1903	Succeeded by Giovanni Battista Barinetti
