= Statue of Indro Montanelli =

- Statua di Indro Montanelli
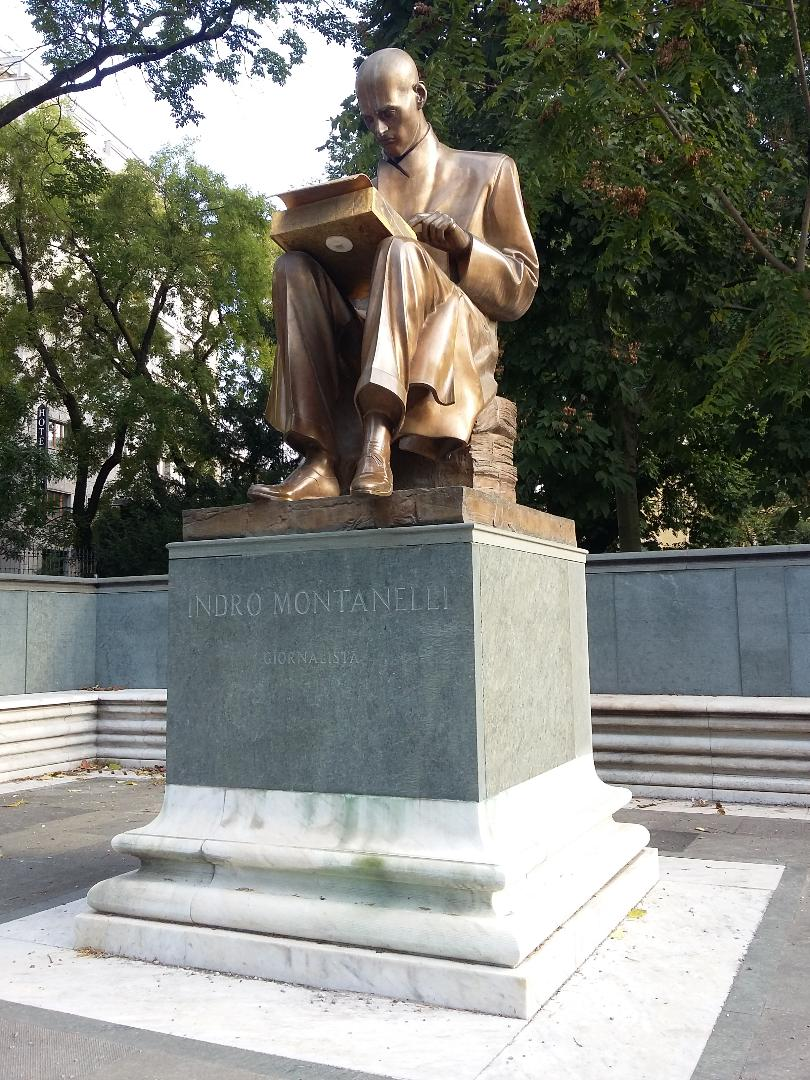
- Interactive map of Statue of Indro Montanelli
- Location: Giardini Pubblici Indro Montanelli, Milan, Italy
- Coordinates: 45°28′25″N 9°11′46″E
- Designer: Vito Tongiani
- Type: Statue
- Material: Bronze
- Dedicated date: 2006
- Dedicated to: Indro Montanelli

A statue of Indro Montanelli is installed in Milan, Italy.
