= Luigi Barbiano di Belgioioso =

Italian politician

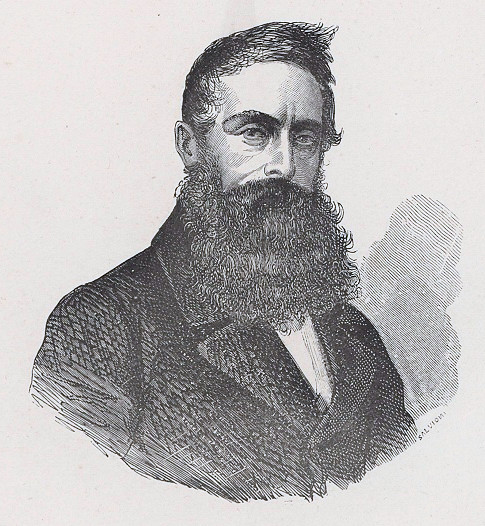
Luigi Barbiano di Belgioioso, 1861

Luigi Barbiano di Belgioioso (29 August 1803 – 13 July 1885) was an Italian politician who served as the final Podestà of Milan from 9 June 1859 to 26 January 1860. He was by birth member of the comital branch of the Barbiano di Belgioioso family, he was a recipient of the Order of Saints Maurice and Lazarus in 1859 when he served as podestà of Milan after the conquest of Lombardy by King Victor Emmanuel II after the Battle of Magenta, and became in 1860 a Senator of the Kingdom of Italy (officially named Kingdom of Sardinia until 1861). He died in Milan, Kingdom of Italy.

Preceded by Giuseppe Sebregondi	Podestà of Milan; 1859–1860	Succeeded by Antonio Beretta as Mayor of Milan
