= Alessandro Durini =

Italian noble and painter (1818–1892)

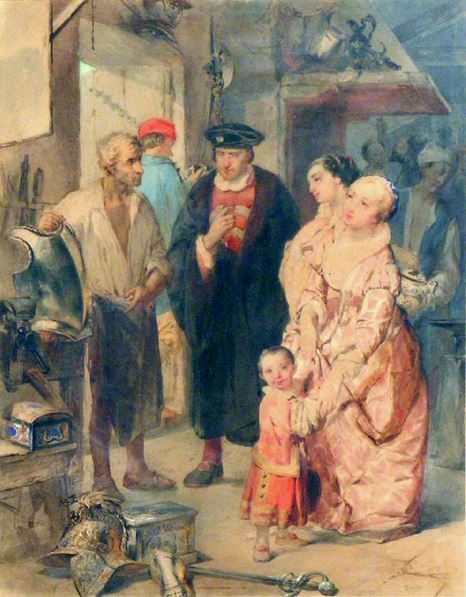
Gunsmith's Shop in Milan

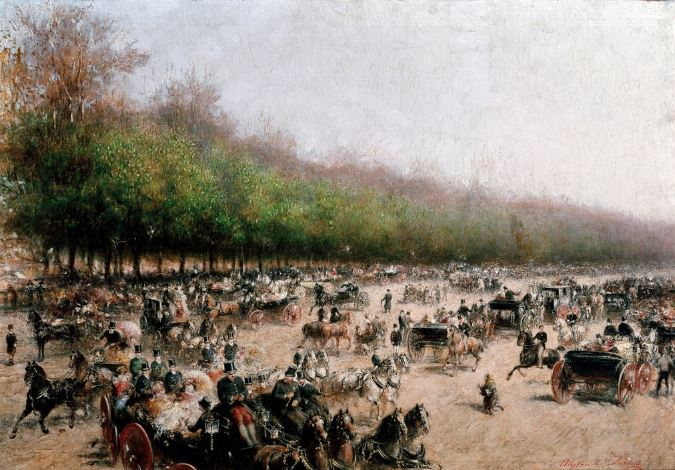
Carriage Traffic Near the Porta Venezia

Alessandro Durini, 6th Count of Monza (30 May 1818, Milan - 9 January 1892, Milan) was an Italian nobleman and painter, primarily in watercolors, depicting historical and genre subjects.

== Biography ==
He was the sixth of eight children born to Antonio Durini, the former Podestà of Milan, and his wife Giuseppina née Casati. He was encouraged to become an artist by the Swiss architect, Ferdinando Albertolli, a friend of the family. From 1836 to 1843, he studied at the Accademia di Brera with Luigi Sabatelli. During his later years there, he decided to devote himself primarily to watercolors. Although discouraged by Sabatelli, he was adamant about making that medium as popular in Italy as it was elsewhere. In 1843, his watercolors attracted the interest of Karl Bryullov and were exhibited in Saint Petersburg. Later, they were exhibited in London (1849), Nice (1850), Paris (1851) and Vienna (1852).

During the Revolutions of 1848, despite his family's position at court, he supported the effort to free Northern Italy from the Austrian Empire. Together with Michelangelo Fumagalli, he created a lithograph depicting a major victory against the Austrians. The proceeds from its sale were donated to help nurse wounded soldiers. He was wounded in a skirmish himself, and took refuge in Lugano with his brother Ercole.

In 1852, back in Milan, he married Guglielmina Litta Biumi, daughter of the recently deceased politician (and amateur artist), Pompeo Litta Biumi. This resolved several financial issues that had been troubling him since the Revolution, and enabled him to devote his time entirely to art. He continued to exhibit regularly throughout the following two decades. One of his most familiar works, a scene from the youth of the French engraver, Jacques Callot, was created in 1872. A mere four years later, however, his ambitious historical scene, depicting Frederick Barbarossa and the Siege of Tortona, received lukewarm reviews at best, and his style was judged to be outdated.

In 1860, he was one of several artists chosen to create an album of historical watercolors, presented to Marshal Jean-Baptiste Philibert Vaillant, in recognition of the French contributions to the defeat of the Austrians. Following the establishment of the new Kingdom of Italy, his support earned him several public offices; becoming a member of the Municipal Council in 1862. That same year, he was elected an honorary member of the Accademia di Brera.

He was chosen to develop the Italian Pavilion at the 1888 Barcelona Universal Exposition and, in 1892, received an appointment to the General Council of the Historical American Exposition in Madrid, but died suddenly before he had taken up his duties.
