= Giulio Belinzaghi =

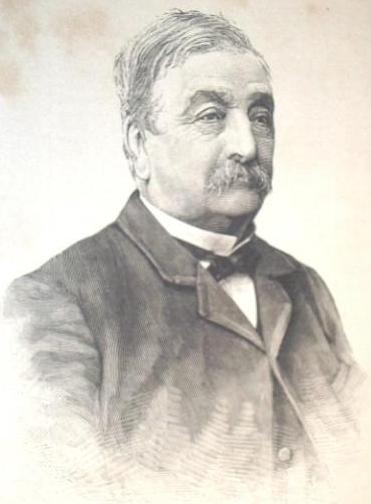
Giulio Belinzaghi, c. 1880

Giulio Belinzaghi (17 October 1818 – 28 August 1892) was an Italian politician who served as the Mayor of Milan from 1868 to 1884 and again from 1889 to 1892. He was mayor of Cernobbio in Lombardy from 1864 to 1868. He also served in the Senate of the Kingdom of Italy. Belinzaghi was a recipient of the Order of Saints Maurice and Lazarus.

Preceded by Antonio Beretta	Mayor of Milan; 1868–1884	Succeeded by Gaetano Negri
Preceded by Gaetano Negri	Mayor of Milan; 1889–1892	Succeeded by Giuseppe Vigoni
