= Antonio Beretta =

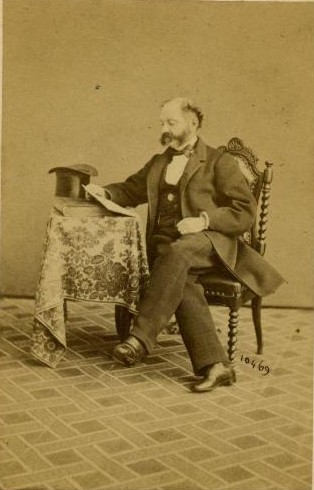
- Beretta in c. 1860–1870

1st Mayor of Milan
- In office 1860–1867
- Preceded by: Luigi Barbiano di Belgioioso as Rector of Milan
- Succeeded by: Giulio Belinzaghi

Personal details
- Born: 17 April 1808 Siziano, Italy
- Died: 14 November 1891 (aged 83) Rome, Italy
- Party: Historical Right
- Profession: Businessman

Antonio Beretta (17 April 1808, in Milan – 14 November 1891, Rome) was the first mayor of Milan under the Kingdom of Italy from 1860 to 1867. He was appointed Senator for life by Victor Emmanuel II in 1862. He was a member of the Società Storica Lombarda. He died in Rome in 1891.

== Biography ==
Antonio Beretta was an important and controversial figure in the history of Milan, remembered in particular as the city's first elected mayor in 1860, at a crucial time for the nascent Kingdom of Italy.

A member of the Lombard bourgeoisie and protagonist of the provisional government in 1848, he was exiled after 1849. Upon his return from exile in 1859, he was chosen by the House of Savoy to lead Milan.

His mandate (until 18 July 1867) was marked by an ambitious urban modernisation plan that profoundly transformed the city. Among his initiatives were the redevelopment of Piazza del Duomo, oversaw the construction of the Galleria Vittorio Emanuele II, the establishment of the Cimitero Monumentale di Milano, the organization of the school system and public transport, the abolition of the public slaughterhouse and the establishment of house numbering. He also moved the seat of the City Council to Palazzo Marino.

However, his administration was plagued by controversy and scandals, mainly related to the increase in the municipal deficit and the construction of the Galleria. Beretta was accused of irregularities in expropriations, in particular of buildings belonging to a relative, and excessive spending, calling into question the transparency of his actions, although a trial did not lead to a guilty verdict.

He was appointed senator in 1862 and later count in 1871 by Victor Emmanuel II. He was a member of the Società Storica Lombarda and the Associazione Industriale Italiana, which founded the Scuola Superiore d'Arte Applicata del Castello Sforzesco in 1882.

He died almost destitute in Rome in 1891.
