= Gaetano Negri =

Italian geologist, writer and politician

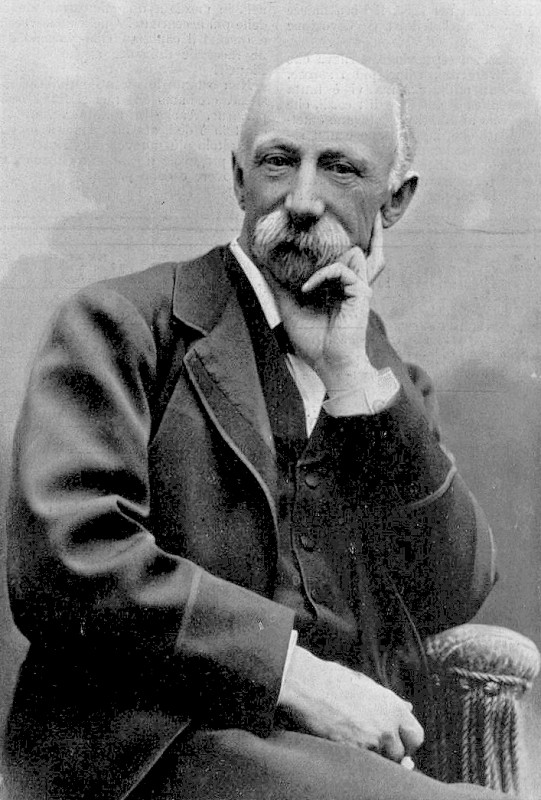
Gaetano Negri

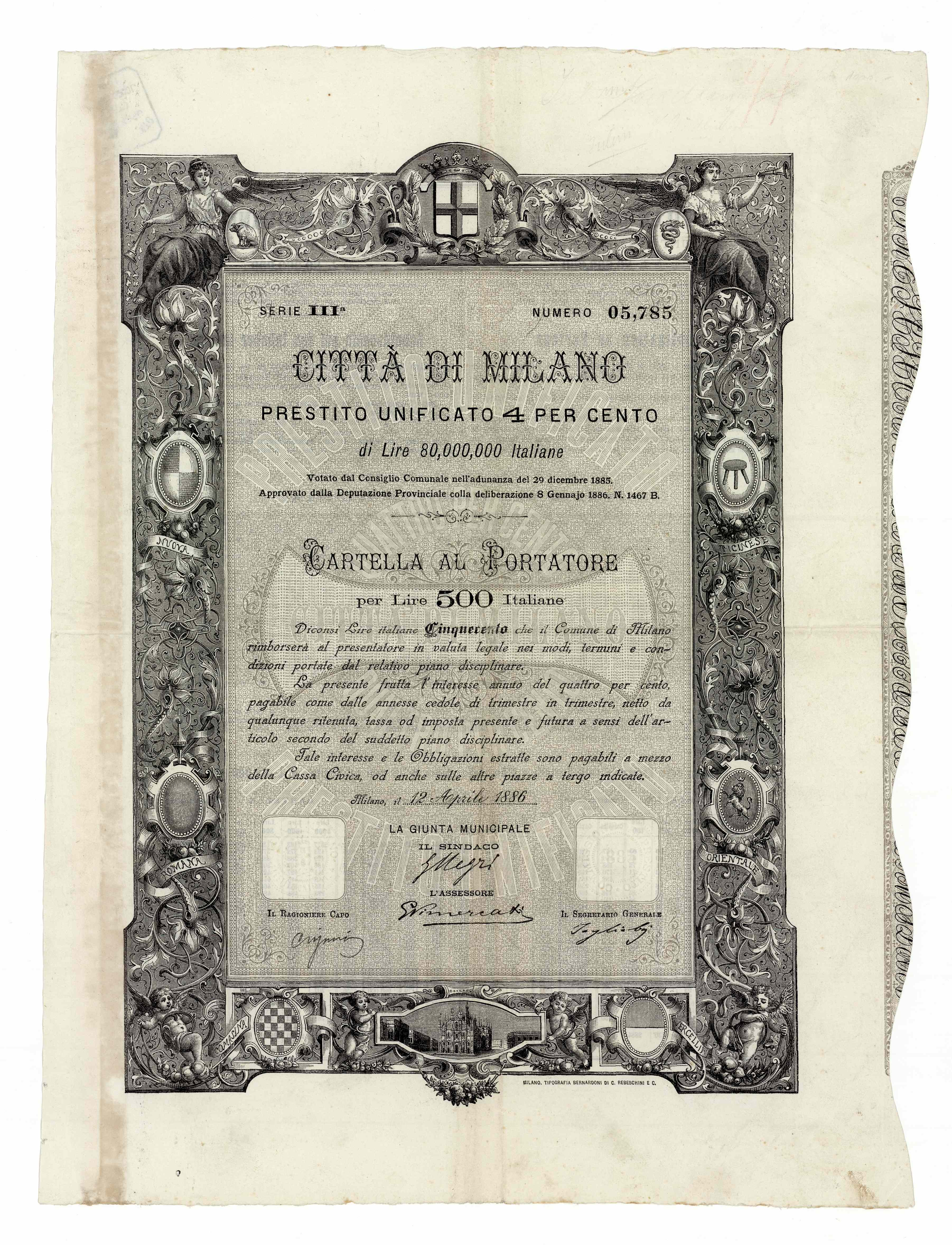
Bond of the City of Milan, issued 12. April 1886, signed by mayor Negri.

Gaetano Negri (11 July 1838 – 31 July 1902) was an Italian geologist, writer and politician who served as the 3rd Mayor of Milan from 1884 to 1889. He also served in the Chamber of Deputies of the Kingdom of Italy.

Preceded by Giulio Belinzaghi	Mayor of Milan; 1884–1889	Succeeded by Giulio Belinzaghi
