= Milan Zoo =

Zoo in Milan, Italy

- Video of Milan's zoo shot in the 1970s
- Interactive map of Milan Zoo
- Type: Zoo
- Location: Milan, Italy
- Coordinates: 45.47509°N 9.19803°E
- Area: Indro Montanelli Public Gardens
- Created: 1932
- Status: Closed in 1992

Milan Zoo was a zoo in Milan, Lombardy, northern Italy, created in the Indro Montanelli Public Gardens in 1932 and closed in 1992.
