= Giardini Pubblici Indro Montanelli =

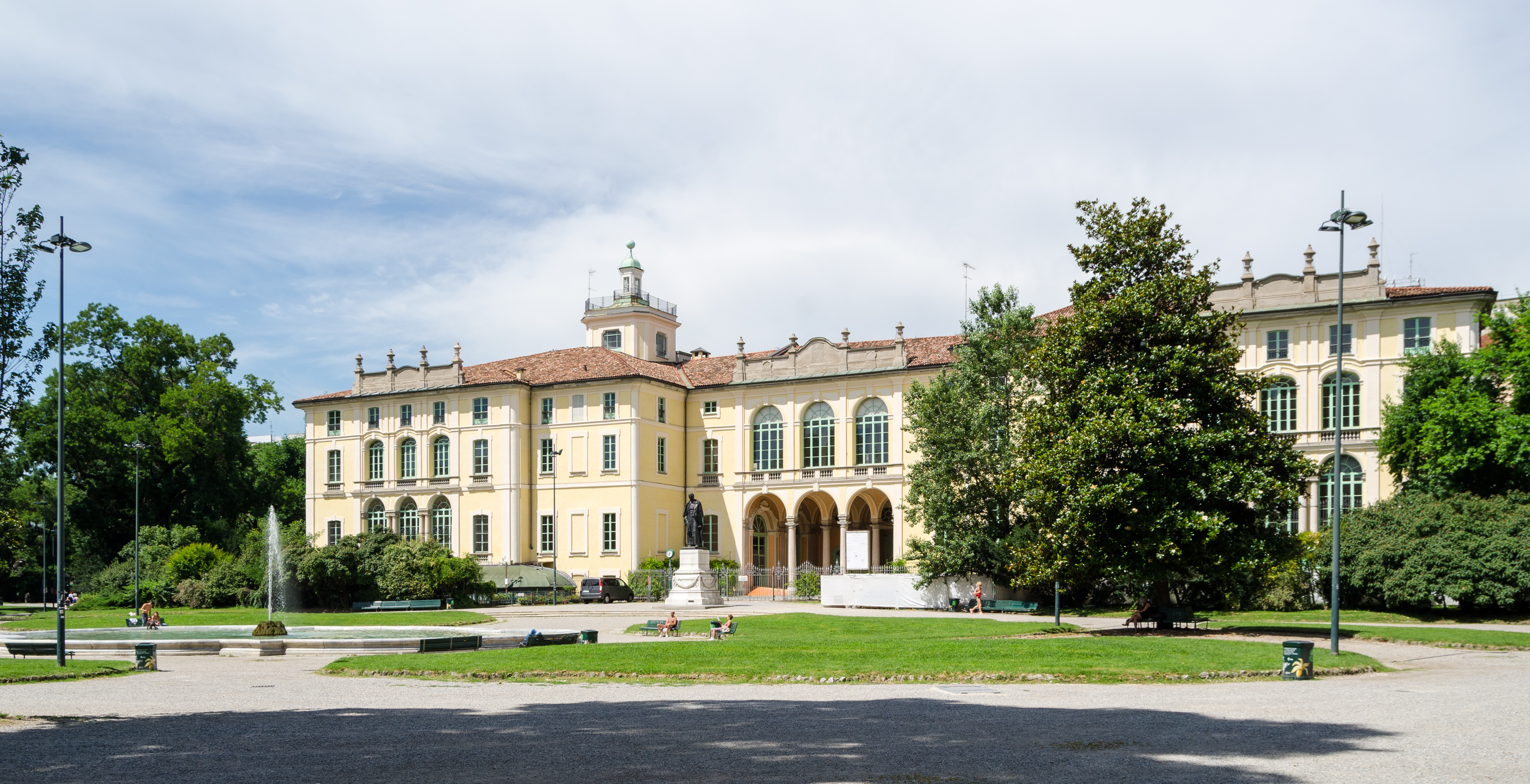
- The gardens in front of Palazzo Dugnani with a fountain on the left

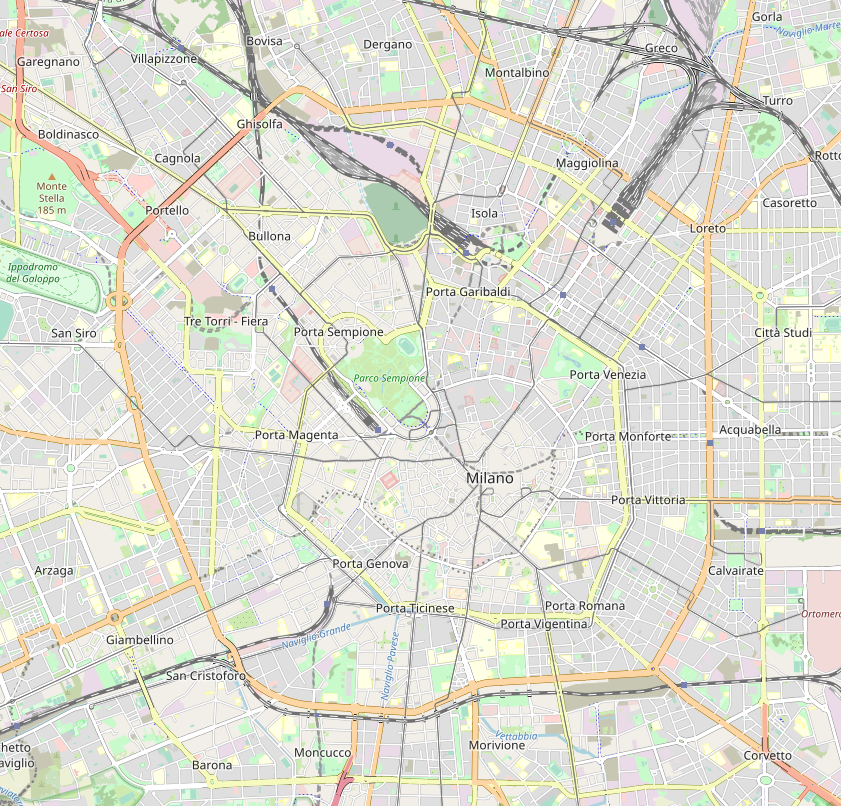
- Location within Milan Location within Italy

General information
- Status: Completed
- Location: Milan, Italy
- Coordinates: 45°28′28″N 09°12′00″E
- Completed: 1784
- Owner: Milan municipality

Giardini Pubblici Indro Montanelli ("Indro Montanelli Public Gardens"), formerly known as Giardini Pubblici and Giardini di Porta Venezia (and renamed after journalist and writer Indro Montanelli in 2002) are a major and historic city park in Milan, Italy, located in the Porta Venezia district, north-east of the city center, in the Zone 1 administrative division. Established in 1784, they are the oldest city park in Milan. After their establishment, the Gardens have been repeatedly enlarged (to the current overall area of 172,000 square metres (43 acres)) and enriched with notable buildings, most notably the Natural History Museum (1888–1893) and the Planetarium (1930). From 1882 until the early 20th century (c. 1906), the Scuola Superiore d'Arte Applicata all'Industria was based in a building within the Giardini Pubblici area, which later became the Museo Civico di Storia Naturale di Milano.

== History ==
Video of Milan's zoo shot in the 1970s

In the second half of the 18th Century, the area of the Public Gardens was owned by the Dugnani family and was mostly cultivated land; a number of canals irrigated the area that were later closed. The area also included the buildings of two former monasteries (the San Dionigi and the Carcanine monasteries) which had ceased activity under Austrian rule. In 1780, Ferdinand, Duke of Breisgau, who was Viceroy of Milan in 1771–1796, assigned architect Giuseppe Piermarini at the renewal of the area and the establishment of a city park. The works were completed between 1782 and 1786, and largely employed prisoners serving a life sentence as manpower. Piermarini's design was largely influenced by French formal gardens, with geometric flower beds and large tree-lined pathways arranged in such a way to create pleasant perspective effects. At the north-eastern corner, an area was dedicated to the game of soccer.

In 1856-1862 landscape architect Giuseppe Balzaretto designed the enlargement of the west side of the Gardens based on the English landscape park model with artificial hills, rooks, and lakes. These works were concluded after the Unification of Italy. In 1877, the Italian aeronautical pioneer Enrico Forlanini publicly demonstrated an unmanned, steam-powered helicopter in the Giardini Pubblici. Weighing only 3.5 kilograms, the aircraft took off vertically, rose to about 13 meters, hovered for roughly 20 seconds, and landed gently. Forlanini's experimental helicopter is widely recognized as the first heavier-than-air craft to successfully take flight powered purely by its own engine. In the 19th Century the Natural History Museum was established, along with other "animal attractions" such as aviaries and exhibits with deer, monkeys and a giraffe; this would later evolve in Milan Zoo (which was dismantled in 1992). Some of the zoo's most popular animals have been stuffed and are exposed in the Natural History Museum; a few structures from the zoo (such as the pavilion that housed the big cats cages) have remained.

== Monuments ==
Several monuments and tourist attractions are enclosed within the park. Notable buildings include the Ulrico Hoepli Planetarium (designed by architect Pietro Portalupi in 1929), the Natural History Museum (1892, Giovanni Cerutti), the 17th Century Palazzo Dugnani, and the eclectic Padiglione del Caffé by architect Giuseppe De Finetti.

A statue of Indro Montanelli has been established in 2002, when the park was renamed after the popular journalist and writer, who was known to relax in the park every morning before entering the nearby offices of his newspaper, Il Giornale. Montanelli was also shot in his legs by the terrorist group Brigate Rosse on June 2, 1977; his statue has been placed close to the spot where this happened.

== See also ==
- Milan's Zoo
- Monument to Ernesto Teodoro Moneta
