= Ettore Ponti =

Italian politician

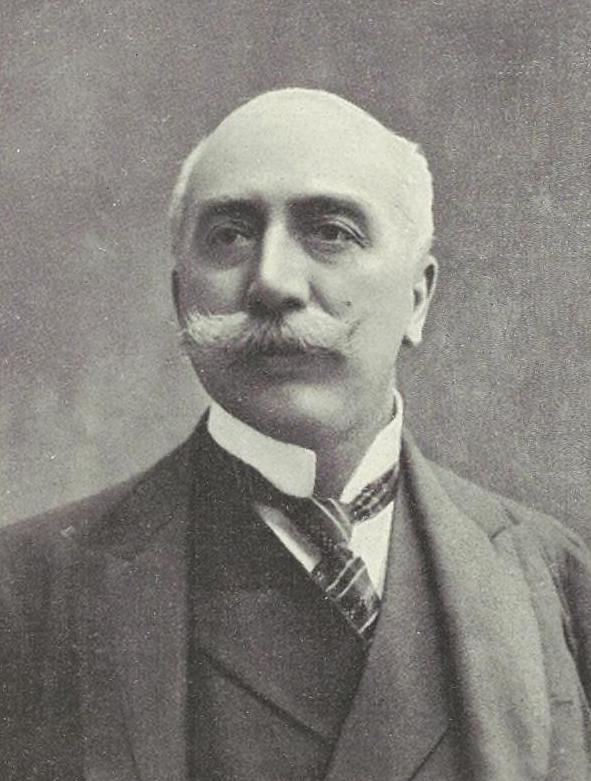
Ettore Ponti

Ettore Ponti (26 January 1855 – 2 October 1919) was an Italian politician who served as the Mayor of Milan from 1905 to 1909. He was a recipient of the Order of Merit for Labour.

Political offices
Preceded by Giovanni Battista Barinetti	Mayor of Milan; 1905–1909	Succeeded by Bassano Gabba
