= Giuseppe Vigoni =

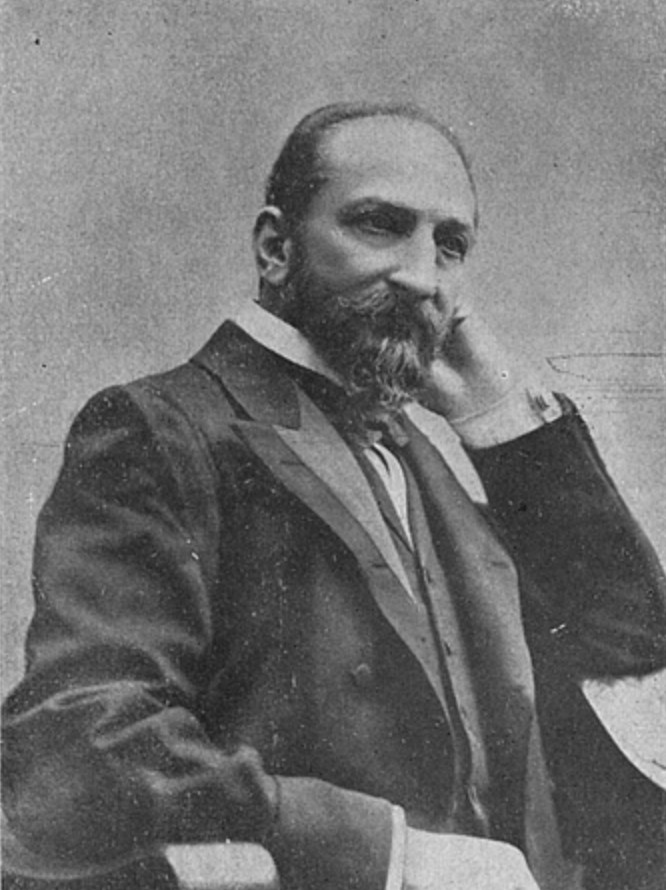
Giuseppe Vigoni, 1914

Giuseppe Vigoni (9 July 1846 – 15 February 1914) was an Italian explorer and geographer who served as the Mayor of Milan from 1892 to 1894 and again from 1895 to 1899. He was a recipient of the Order of Saints Maurice and Lazarus. He also served in the Senate of the Kingdom of Italy.

Political offices
Preceded by Giulio Belinzaghi	Mayor of Milan; 1892–1894	Succeeded by Adeodato Bonasi as Regio commissario straordinario
Preceded by Adeodato Bonasi as Regio commissario straordinario	Mayor of Milan; 1895–1899	Succeeded by Giuseppe Mussi
