= Istituto Nazionale dei Tumori =

Cancer hospital and research institute in Milan, Italy

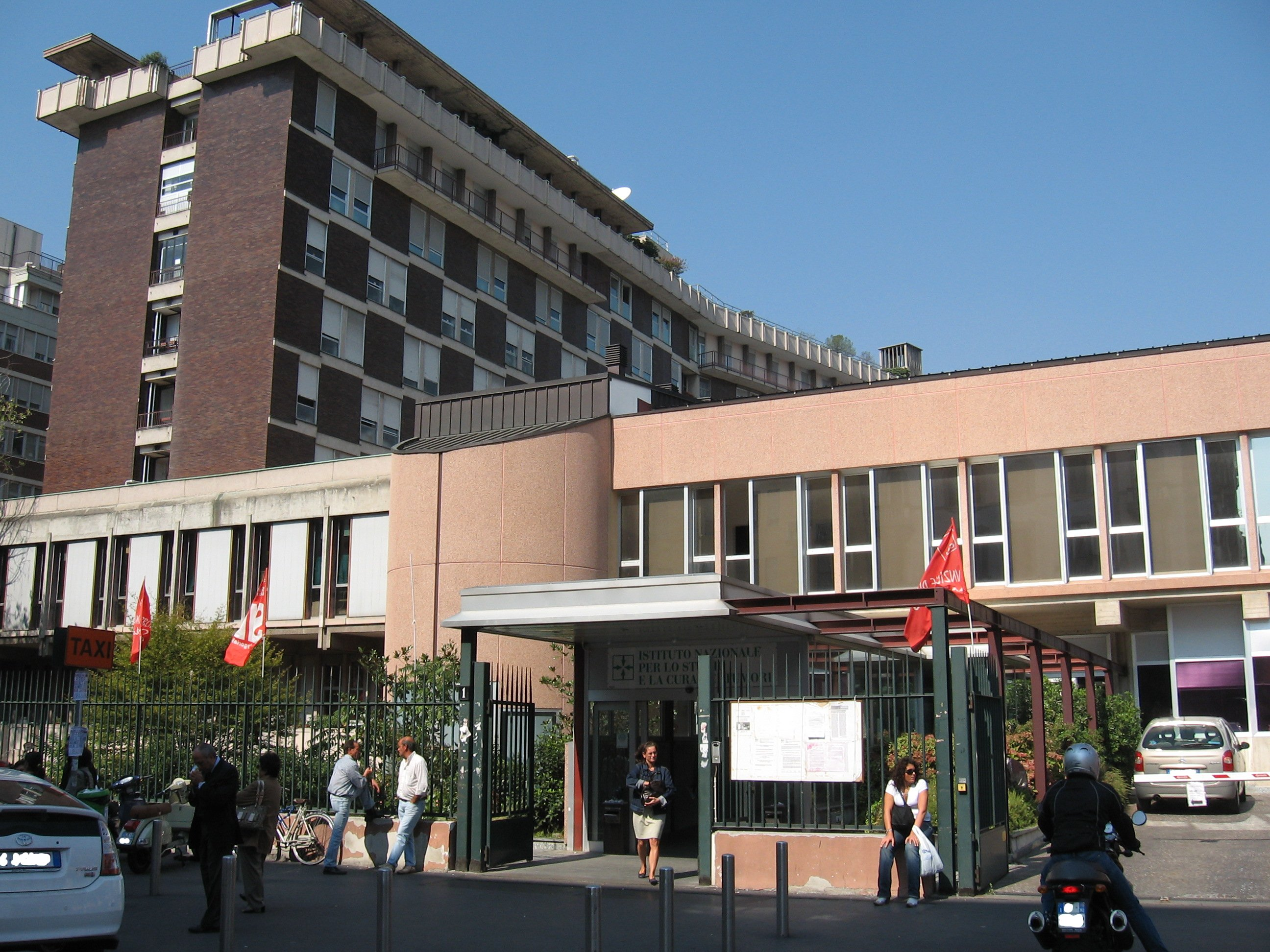

Geography
- Location: Via Giacomo Venezian 1, Città Studi, Milan, Lombardy, Italy
- Coordinates: 45.4774°N 9.2286°E

Organisation
- Care system: Public
- Type: Specialist
- Affiliated university: University of Milan

Services
- Beds: 464
- Speciality: Oncology

History
- Founded: 12 April 1928; 98 years ago

Links
- Website: www.istitutotumori.mi.it
- Lists: Hospitals in Italy

The Fondazione IRCCS Istituto Nazionale dei Tumori (English: National Cancer Institute), also known as the Istituto dei Tumori di Milano or by the initials INT, is a public hospital and biomedical research institution in Milan, Italy, dedicated to the clinical treatment and scientific research of cancer. Founded in 1928 as the Istituto Vittorio Emanuele III per lo studio e la cura del cancro ("Victor Emmanuel III Institute for the Study and Treatment of Cancer"), it is the largest oncological center in Lombardy and hosts the coordinating office of the Lombardy Oncological Network (Rete Oncologica Lombarda, ROL).

The institute was inaugurated on 12 April 1928 by King Victor Emmanuel III. In 1939 it received the status of Istituto di ricovero e cura a carattere scientifico (IRCCS), an Italian designation for a hospital that combines healthcare with biomedical research. It is recognized as a Comprehensive Cancer Center by the Organisation of European Cancer Institutes (OECI), is the largest center for pediatric oncology in Italy, and is the only Italian oncological hospital authorized to perform liver transplantation.

== History ==
=== Foundation and early years ===
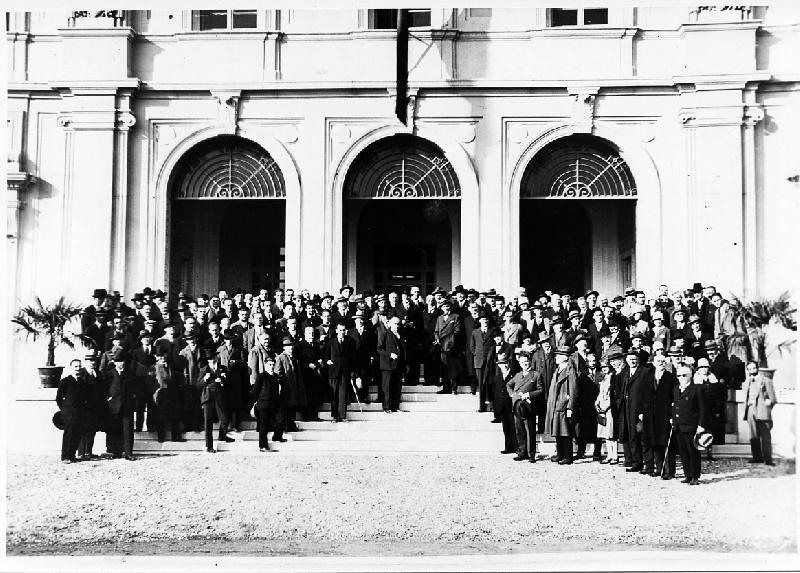
The inauguration of the institute on 12 April 1928

In the early 20th century, the social significance of cancer as a disease began to be recognized. Gaetano Fichera, director of the surgical clinic of the University of Pavia, had long studied the problem and developed his "theory of the oncogenic imbalance". He presented his findings around the world, reaching Latin America in 1924 with the help of the senator Luigi Edoardo Frisoni. The success of these lectures prompted Frisoni to begin a fundraising campaign, starting in São Paulo, for the creation of an "Istituto Fichera" for the study and treatment of tumors to be built in Milan.

Decisive in realizing the project was Luigi Mangiagalli, a physician, senator and mayor of Milan, who argued strongly that cancer patients should be hospitalized because, in his words, even "when they cannot be cured, they can be cared for". Mangiagalli's vision prevailed over that of Luigi Zoja, a physician at the newly founded University of Milan, who proposed a foundation devoted solely to study rather than a clinical institute; Zoja's proposal, which did not provide for the admission of patients to a dedicated facility, was judged unsuitable.

The institute was conceived on 19 January 1925, with Fichera designated as its future director general. The first stone was laid on 28 April 1925 in the presence of King Victor Emmanuel III and Pietro Fedele, Minister of Public Education. The first statute, drawn up on 8 May 1925, defined the institution's purpose as "propaganda for the knowledge and identification of tumors, experimental scientific research and the treatment of the sick".

The Istituto Vittorio Emanuele III per lo studio e la cura del cancro was inaugurated on 12 April 1928, again in the presence of the king, who was given a guided tour by Mangiagalli and Fichera. Clinical activity began on 1 May 1928 with the transfer of 23 women already hospitalized in the gynecological oncotherapy ward of the Istituti clinici di perfezionamento.

Designed by the engineer Giannino Ferrini, chief engineer of the comune of Milan, the institute occupied about 12,000 square metres (130,000 sq ft) between via Ponzio and via Strambio, with six buildings linked by underground galleries and porticoes. It had a capacity of 192 beds plus 40 paying beds divided into medical-surgical, gynecological and radiological sections, alongside laboratories, animal facilities for experimentation, an operating room and a radiology division with advanced diagnostic and therapeutic equipment. From its foundation the institute operated a radiotherapy department, and the government donated 300 mg of radium to the new facility, a substantial amount at a time when Italy's total holdings of radium amounted to only a few grams.

=== Life inside the institute ===
Among the notable figures in the hospital's early life were the nurses, nuns, women physicians and patronesses. Nurses were young unmarried women housed in a boarding house, unlike the male "orderlies and workers", who were not accommodated on site. Women physicians were a rarity, appearing only occasionally as assistants in the "medicine and laboratory" section during the early years.

In 1935 volunteer students of the Italian Red Cross nursing school also began to work at the institute; the director Pietro Rondoni praised their contribution as an "admirable feminine cooperation with the progress of science and the relief of human suffering". A "Committee of Patronesses" organized charitable collections and public lectures, while a parallel commission of "Visiting Ladies" followed patients after their discharge. Patients were separated by sex and economic condition, distinguishing between the "poor", admitted to wards of up to forty beds, and "paying" patients, who occupied small single rooms.

=== The Fascist period ===
In 1935 Fichera was succeeded as director general by Pietro Rondoni, a pathologist and oncologist then heading the Institute of General Pathology he had founded at the University of Milan. Rondoni emphasized the centrality of research, and under his direction the institute's name was altered to place the word "study" before "treatment".

Progress was slowed by World War II. From July 1940 physicians, technicians and staff were called up for military service. As Milan came under increasingly intense bombing, patients were transferred to a temporary site at Cernusco sul Naviglio, which was used until the fall of Fascism, while outpatient and radiological outpatient care continued at the Milan site. The first postwar decade saw a strong increase in clinical activity and a notable advance in experimental research.

=== Second half of the 20th century ===
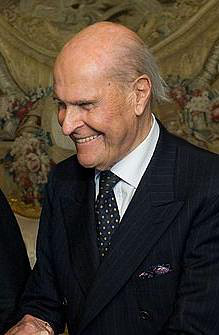
Umberto Veronesi, director of the institute from 1976 to 1994

Rondoni was succeeded by Pietro Bucalossi, head of the surgery division, whose appointment was confirmed by the council on 6 December 1956 for a ten-year term. Bucalossi sought to overcome the old dichotomy between study and treatment, holding that the treatment of cancer could itself become research. In May 1960 an agreement was reached with the company Farmitalia to study drugs with anti-tumor action on a strictly scientific basis. Between 1960 and 1970 the first divisions of experimental oncology were established, and the institute recorded the first gastroscopy in Italy (1961), the first worldwide trial of endolymphatic radiotherapy with radioactive iodine (1963), designation as a World Health Organization reference center for melanoma (1965), and the first Italian use of total parenteral nutrition (1969).

In 1973 Bucalossi took leave for a government post, and Umberto Veronesi took over, being formally appointed director general in May 1976. Among the most celebrated achievements under Veronesi's direction was the demonstration that small tumors did not require highly demolitive surgery, sparing many women a mastectomy in favor of breast-conserving therapy and overturning the "dogma" that oncological surgery should be as radical as possible. In research, the first Italian anti-tumor monoclonal antibody was produced in 1981, and a surgical day hospital was established in 1979.

The complex retained the name "Istituto nazionale Vittorio Emanuele III per lo studio e la cura del cancro" until 1982, when Presidential Decree No. 96 of 29 January 1982 changed its name to "Istituto nazionale per lo studio e la cura dei tumori". The institute continued to reach significant milestones, including the first in vivo diagnosis by echocardiography of a cardiac localization of malignant lymphoma (1983); the first demonstration of the somatic nature of the activation of the K-ras oncogene in lung cancer (1984); the installation of the first magnetic resonance imaging scanner in a Milanese public body (1985), inaugurated by prime minister Bettino Craxi; the isolation of the first thyroid oncogene (RET/PTC1) in 1990; and, in 1992, the first transplantation of pancreatic islets in Europe.

In April 1994 Veronesi resigned to devote himself to the scientific direction of the European Institute of Oncology, and the deputy director Franco Rilke was called to fill the vacancy. Under Rilke a medical oncology day hospital was created, and in 1995 the institute achieved the first positron emission tomography with the F18-fluorodeoxyglucose tracer.

== The institute today ==
In 2006 the institute was converted into a foundation under Italian legislative decree 288/2003, by resolution of the Lombardy regional council. It has been recognized as a Comprehensive Cancer Center by the Organisation of European Cancer Institutes (OECI), reflecting the functional continuum between clinical care and research, and is an ESMO-designated center of integrated oncology and palliative care. The institute is the largest center for pediatric oncology in Italy and the second in Europe, and is the only Italian cancer center authorized to perform liver transplants. Its pediatric structure treats over 200 new patients a year, at least 75% of whom take part in clinical protocols, and in 2011 it launched the "Youth Project" (Progetto Giovani) dedicated to adolescents and young adults. The institute is also a leading European referral center for neuroendocrine tumors: on 14 December 2010 it was certified by the European Neuroendocrine Tumor Society (ENETS), which ranked it among the ten best centers in Europe for these diseases.

The institute operates 464 inpatient beds and provides more than 400,000 outpatient visits per year. Its research focuses on predictive medicine, including genetic testing of healthy individuals to quantify cancer risk, and on the personalization of diagnostic and therapeutic pathways, alongside the promotion of healthy lifestyles for the primary prevention of cancer. The institute coordinates numerous national and international clinical trials and was the first in Italy to conduct research on the biological and molecular characterization of tumors, leading to the identification of oncogenes involved in thyroid cancer. As of 2025 it operates one of Italy's most active pancreatic-cancer units, bringing together surgeons, oncologists, endoscopists, radiotherapists and researchers in a multidisciplinary program.

== Surgery ==
The institute's Department of Surgery includes internationally recognized units for hepatobiliary and transplant surgery and for the surgery of sarcomas.

Hepato-gastro-pancreatic surgery and liver transplantation are led by Vincenzo Mazzaferro, professor of surgery at the University of Milan and director of the unit, who since 1991 headed the first group in Italy to systematically perform liver transplantation for cancer. In 1996 Mazzaferro and colleagues at the institute defined the Milan criteria, a set of size-and-number thresholds (a single tumor up to 5 cm, or no more than three tumors each up to 3 cm, without vascular invasion or extrahepatic spread) for selecting patients with hepatocellular carcinoma for liver transplantation. The criteria were subsequently adopted by organ-allocation systems including the United Network for Organ Sharing and Eurotransplant and remain a standard reference in the selection of transplant candidates. The institute is the only Italian cancer center authorized to perform liver transplantation.

The Sarcoma Service, directed since 2001 by Alessandro Gronchi, who has also chaired the Department of Surgery since 2022, is a high-volume tertiary referral center for sarcoma. It admits and operates on about 500 new patients a year, including at least 80 with retroperitoneal sarcoma, and is one of the largest such centers internationally. Gronchi leads the Transatlantic Australasian Retroperitoneal Sarcoma Working Group (TARPSWG), an international research consortium focused on retroperitoneal sarcoma, and the service coordinates the Italian national rare-tumor network for sarcomas.

== Directors ==
The institute has been directed by:

Director	Term
Gaetano Fichera	1928–1935
Pietro Rondoni	1935–1956
Pietro Bucalossi	1956–1975
Umberto Veronesi	1976–1994
Franco Rilke	1994–1998
Natale Cascinelli	1998–2006
Marco Pierotti	2006–2014
Ugo Pastorino	2014–2015
Giovanni Apolone	2015–2025
Paolo Corradini	2025–present

As of 2026 the general director is Maria Teresa Montella, the scientific director is Paolo Corradini, and the health director (direttore sanitario) is Cesare Alessandro Maria Candela.

== Bibliography ==
- Placucci, Patrizia (1995). Dal male oscuro alla malattia curabile. Storia dell'Istituto nazionale per lo studio e la cura dei tumori di Milano (in Italian). Bari: Laterza. ISBN 88-420-4864-X.
- Secchi, Luigi Lorenzo (1928). "L'istituto "Vittorio Emanuele III" per lo studio e la cura del cancro". Il Politecnico (in Italian). LXXVI (VII). Milan.
