= Carlo Villa (mayor) =

Italian politician

Carlo Villa (January 19, 1766 – February 9, 1846) was an Italian politician. He was born in and was mayor of Milan.

Preceded by Giovanni Cesare Giulini Della Porta	Rector of Milan; 1820–1827	Succeeded by Antonio Durini
