= Carlo Tognoli =

Italian politician (1938–2021)

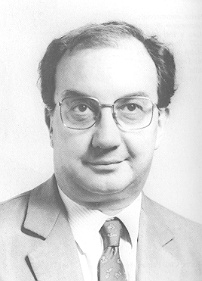

Minister of Tourism and Entertainment
- In office 6 February 1990 – 28 June 1992
- Prime Minister: Giulio Andreotti
- Preceded by: Franco Carraro
- Succeeded by: Margherita Boniver

Minister of Urban Areas
- In office 28 July 1987 – 22 July 1989
- Prime Minister: Ciriaco De Mita; Giovanni Goria
- Succeeded by: Carmelo Conte

Member of the Chamber of Deputies
- In office 2 July 1987 – 14 April 1994
- Constituency: Milan

Member of the European Parliament
- In office 24 July 1984 – 15 September 1987
- Constituency: North-West Italy

Mayor of Milan
- In office 12 May 1976 – 21 December 1986
- Preceded by: Aldo Aniasi
- Succeeded by: Paolo Pillitteri

Personal details
- Born: 16 June 1938 Milan, Italy
- Died: 5 March 2021 (aged 82) Milan, Italy
- Party: Italian Socialist Party

Carlo Tognoli (16 June 1938 – 5 March 2021) was an Italian politician who was mayor of Milan and minister of the First Italian Republic.

== Biography ==
Tognoli was born at Milan and joined the Italian Socialist Party (Partito Socialista Italiano; PSI) in 1958. Elected into the Italian Chamber of Deputies, he was also Mayor of Milan from 1976 to 1986. In 1984–1987 he was also elected to the European Parliament; in the latter year, he was appointed Minister of Problems of Urban Areas in the cabinets of Giovanni Goria and Ciriaco De Mita. Later he was Minister of Tourism and Spectacles in the 6th and 7th Giulio Andreotti governments.

From 1981 to 1992, Tognoli was a journalist and director of the monthly newspaper Critica Sociale. In 1992, he was involved in the Tangentopoli scandal together with his party colleague Paolo Pillitteri (who had been his successor as mayor of Milan). Tognoli subsequently abandoned political activity and in 1995 obtained a position in Mediobanca thanks to the intercession of Enrico Cuccia.

Tognoli died in Milan on 5 March 2021, at the age of 82, from complications from COVID-19 during the COVID-19 pandemic in Italy.

== Electoral history ==
Election	House	Constituency	Party	Votes	Result
1984	European Parliament	North-West Italy	PSI	337,408	Elected
1987	Chamber of Deputies	Milan–Pavia	PSI	112,800	Elected
1992	Chamber of Deputies	Milan–Pavia	PSI	31,216	Elected
