= Pietro Bucalossi =

Italian physician and politician

Pietro Bucalossi OMRI
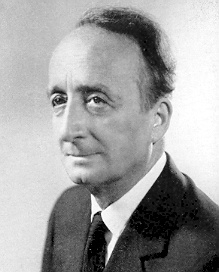

Minister of Public Works
- In office 23 November 1974 – 12 February 1976
- Prime Minister: Aldo Moro
- Preceded by: Salvatore Lauricella
- Succeeded by: Antonino Pietro Gullotti

Minister of University and Research
- In office 7 July 1973 – 14 March 1974
- Prime Minister: Mariano Rumor
- Preceded by: Pier Luigi Romita
- Succeeded by: Giovanni Pieraccini

Mayor of Milan
- In office 17 February 1964 – 13 December 1967
- Preceded by: Gino Cassinis
- Succeeded by: Aldo Aniasi

Member of the Chamber of Deputies
- In office 5 June 1968 – 19 June 1979
- Constituency: Milan
- In office 12 June 1958 – 17 February 1964
- Constituency: Milan

Personal details
- Born: Pietro Enrico Alfredo Bucalossi; 9 August 1905 San Miniato, Italy
- Died: 15 March 1992 (aged 86) Milan, Italy
- Party: PdA (1942–1947); PSDI (1947–1968); PRI (1968–1977); PLI (1977–1979)
- Education: University of Pisa
- Profession: Physician

Pietro Bucalossi (9 August 1905 – 15 March 1992) was an Italian physician and politician. He is remembered for his cancer research, and his austerity and small government policies while Mayor of Milan in the 1960s.

== Biography ==
=== Medical career ===
Born in San Miniato, Tuscany, Pietro Bucalossi was a graduate in medicine and surgery from the University of Pisa. He became a prominent oncologist and an associate of the National Institute of Cancer (Istituto Nazionale dei Tumori; INT), and moved to Milan in 1934. He was a lifelong member of the "Italian League for the Fight against Cancer", and was also Director of the INT from 1956 to 1974. Additionally, he wrote several medical books with his protégé, Umberto Veronesi.

=== War record ===
In 1940, at the beginning of World War II, he began service as a medical captain in the Italian Royal Army. Following the events of 25 July (Benito Mussolini's deposition) in 1943, he left the army and entered both the Italian resistance movement and the National Liberation Committee as a member of the Action Party (Partito d'Azione; PdA). Although a committed partisan, by the end of the war he harboured a profound distrust of the Italian Communist Party (Partito Comunista Italiano; PCI) for its role in concealing the death of Mussolini.

=== Political career ===
In 1947, the Action Party disbanded and Bucalossi joined the Socialist Party of Italian Workers (Partito Socialista dei Lavoratori Italiani; PSLI), a breakaway from the Italian Socialist Party (Partito Socialista Italiano; PSI) that later became the Italian Democratic Socialist Party (Partito Socialista Democratico Italiano; PSDI). In 1958 he was elected on the PSDI list to represent Milan in the Chamber of Deputies, where he remained for six years before resigning to become Mayor of Milan in 1964.

Known for his strong personality and short temper, Bucalossi was a sincere believer in small government (despite his party's statist, social-democratic philosophy), similar to that of an American fiscal conservative. He introduced balanced budget and austerity policies, which cut the city administration's spending drastically, and opposed the creation of regional councils, sarcastically dubbing them "parlamentini" ("small parliaments"). However, he also secured enough funding to ensure the opening of several public parks, the expansion of Linate Airport, and the inauguration of the first Milan Metro underground railway line.

In 1967, he resigned as mayor due to a lack of support from his party colleagues, who were discomfited by his opposition to the pact then in place between the PSI and PSDI. He was re-elected a year later to the Chamber of Deputies as a representative of the Italian Republican Party (Partito Repubblicano Italiano; PRI). Bucalossi subsequently became the Minister of Public Works in Aldo Moro's fourth Cabinet from 1974 to 1976, where he introduced a construction permit law that sought to quell the rapid increase in illegal property construction ("abusivismo").

In 1977, Bucalossi left the PRI in disagreement over the party's support for abortion, joining the Italian Liberal Party (Partito Liberale Italiano; PLI) soon afterwards. By this stage, he had become a leading critic of the Historic Compromise between the PCI and the Christian Democrats (Democrazia Cristiana; DC), arguing that the experience of having Communists in the governmental majority had brought about a decline in the wellbeing of the country.

After his time as a deputy came to an end in 1979, he left Italian politics and returned to his job as an oncologist. He died in 1992.
