= Piero Parini =

Italian journalist, politician and soldier

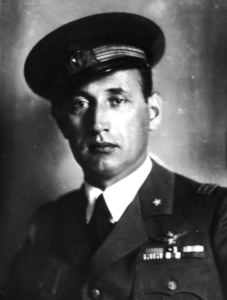
Piero Parini

Piero Parini (13 November 1894 – 23 August 1993) was an Italian journalist, politician and soldier. He fought in World War I and the Second Italo-Ethiopian War. He rose through the ranks of the Italian political establishment through his work as diplomat and director of the Fascist newspaper Il Popolo d'Italia. During World War II, he became the de facto ruler of the annexed Ionian Islands in Greece, and later supported the Italian Social Republic, becoming the mayor of Milan.

== Early career ==
Piero Parini was born on 13 November 1894 in Milan, into a family of a railway official. During World War I he fought as an officer of Corpo Aeronautico Militare. Following the end of the war, he became a foreign correspondent and later director for the Fascist flagship newspaper Il Popolo d'Italia. In 1928, he was appointed coordinator of Fascist organizations of the Italian diaspora. He later worked as the Italian ambassador in Aleppo. In 1936, he founded and commanded a unit of Italian expatriates in the Second Italo-Ethiopian War, capturing the city of Dire Dawa. In 1937, he visited Japan and China as part of a diplomatic mission. In 1939, he became an advisor of the prime minister of the puppet Albanian Kingdom, Shefqet Vërlaci.

== Later career ==
Following the Battle of Greece and the Axis occupation of Greece, the Ionian Islands came under Italian control. On 22 April 1941, after discussions between the German and Italian rulers, Adolf Hitler agreed that Italy could proceed with a de facto annexation of the islands. On 5 June 1941, Parini arrived at Corfu as the new Chief of the Political Affairs Bureau of the Ionian Islands, a political body ruling the islands. Parini accommodated the bureau headquarters in the Mon Repos villa, enacting a rigorous Italianization campaign. On 10 August, the Ionian Islands, except Kythira, were annexed by Italy as part of the Grande Communità del Nuovo Impero Romano (Great Community of the New Roman Empire). On 16 August, Parini replaced Corfu mayor Spyridon Kollas with lawyer Gerasimos Tryfonas, to sever all administrative ties between the islands and the Greek mainland and the collaborationist government in Athens. Parini ruled as de facto dictator imposing new laws or ignoring existing ones as he pleased.

Parini encouraged the migration of Italians to the islands, expanded and legalized the underground Fascist organizations, and promoted his policies through a radio station and the official newspaper Jonica, later replaced by Gazzetta Jonica. Pictures of the heroes of the Greek War of Independence were removed from public schools as were book chapters dealing with modern Greek history. The Italian language became a mandatory school subject and shop owners were forced to use bilingual signs. On 25 March 1942, the circulation of the Greek drachma was outlawed and replaced by the Italian Ionian drachma. Greek stamps were replaced in a similar manner. The Ionian Islands did not manage to escape the horrors of the Great Famine of 1941–42, partially due to Parini's refusal to allow the Red Cross to distribute aid in the region.

Following the Fall of the Fascist regime in Italy, Parini departed Corfu in late August 1943 on the yacht Aspasia, while a second ship carried 40 crates of looted art he had collected. He supported the Italian Social Republic and was appointed mayor of Milan. In April 1945 he escaped to Switzerland with forged Spanish papers along with his second wife Melpo Fafaliou, whom he had married in 1944 following the death of his first spouse Rozetta Colombi. The authenticity of the papers was soon questioned and Parini was deported to Italy, where he was given a 12-year prison term by a military tribunal for war crimes committed during his spell as mayor of Milan; he was released in 1946 in an amnesty. A second trial regarding war crimes committed in the Ionian Islands ended in his acquittal. He then emigrated to South America with his wife, where he died in 1993.
