= Aldo Aniasi =

Italian politician (1921–2005)

Aldo Aniasi OMRI
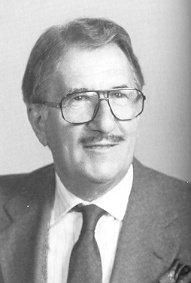

Minister of Regional Affairs
- In office 28 June 1981 – 1 December 1982
- Prime Minister: Giovanni Spadolini
- Preceded by: Roberto Mazzotta
- Succeeded by: Fabio Fabbri

Minister of Health
- In office 4 April 1980 – 26 June 1981
- Prime Minister: Francesco Cossiga, Arnaldo Forlani
- Preceded by: Renato Altissimo
- Succeeded by: Renato Altissimo

Member of the Italian Chamber of Deputies
- In office 5 July 1976 – 14 April 1994
- Constituency: Milan

Mayor of Milan
- In office 13 December 1967 – 12 May 1976
- Preceded by: Pietro Bucalossi
- Succeeded by: Carlo Tognoli

Personal details
- Born: 31 May 1921 Palmanova, Italy
- Died: 27 August 2005 (aged 84) Milan, Italy
- Party: PCI (1943–1946); PSDI (1947–1967); PSI (1967–1994); DS (1998–2005)
- Profession: Surveyor

Aldo Aniasi, OMRI (31 May 1921 – 27 August 2005) was an Italian politician.

== Biography ==
Aniasi was born in Palmanova, in Friuli. In 1943 he joined the Brigate Garibaldi, the paramilitary wing of the Italian Communist Party (PCI) in the Italian resistance. He fought in Piedmont, in Valsesia and Ossola. In 1945 he was briefly the lieutenant for the National Liberation Committee in Milan.

After the war Aniasi left the PCI, adhering (after 1947) to the Italian Democratic Socialist Party (PSDI). Aniasi was a councilman of Milan from 1951 to 1967, when he became Mayor of the city following the resignation of Pietro Bucalossi; he contributed to Bucalossi's fall by leaving the PSDI to join the Italian Socialist Party (PSI). Mayor during the "Years of Lead", Aniasi was often in disagreement with the prefect Libero Mazza: while the latter supported law and order policies against the Red Brigades and other terrorists, Aniasi supported disarming the police instead. Aniasi was also criticized for seemingly downplaying terrorism.

In 1976, he was elected to the Chamber of Deputies, where he remained until 1994. In the 1980s, he was Minister of Health in the Cossiga II and Forlani Cabinets. As Minister, he created the National Health Service.

After 1994, he left politics temporarily before joining the Democrats of the Left (DS), becoming a member of its directive council. He died in Milan in 2005 and is buried at the city's Monumental Cemetery.

== Electoral history ==
| Election | House | Constituency | Party | Votes | Result |
|---|---|---|---|---|---|
| 1976 | Chamber of Deputies | Milan–Pavia | PSI | 65,962 | Elected |
| 1979 | Chamber of Deputies | Milan–Pavia | PSI | 39,565 | Elected |
| 1983 | Chamber of Deputies | Milan–Pavia | PSI | 29,863 | Elected |
| 1987 | Chamber of Deputies | Milan–Pavia | PSI | 45,675 | Elected |
| 1992 | Chamber of Deputies | Milan–Pavia | PSI | 11,903 | Elected |

== Honour ==
- Italy: Knight Grand Cross of the Order of Merit of the Italian Republic (27 December 1967)
