= Antonio Durini =

Italian noble and politician

Antonio Durini di Monza (6 June 1770, Milan – 16 April 1850, Milan) was an Italian nobleman and politician who served two terms as the Podestà (Rector) of Milan.

== Biography ==
He was the son of Gian Giacomo Durini, Fourth Count of Monza (1717-1794), and was initially destined for an ecclesiastical. He studied in Rome, took his vows there, and was appointed Governor of Città di Castello at the age of twenty-six. Shortly after, Napoleon invaded the Papal States and all of the authorities were removed from office.

He returned to Milan, gave up his priesthood, called himself a Republican, and established his political career in the Cisalpine Republic. When the Napoleonic Kingdom of Italy was declared, he was appointed as the first Podestà of Milan. He held that position until 1814, when the Austrian Empire retook Northern Italy.

In 1808, he married Giuseppina Casati, the sister of Teresa Casati, who was married to the famous patriot, Federico Confalonieri. His son, Alessandro, became the 6th Count of Monza and an artist who supported the efforts to oust the Austrians.

He, however, was able to integrate himself into the new Austrian regime, thanks to his numerous friends in the nobility. As a result, in 1827, he was restored to the office of Podestà, which he held until 1837. He withdrew from public life in 1843 and died seven years later, aged seventy-nine.

| Preceded by New office | Podestà of Milan; 1807–1814 | Succeeded by Giovanni Cesare Giulini Della Porta |
| Preceded by Carlo Villa | Podestà of Milan; 1827–1837 | Succeeded by Gabrio Casati |

== Sources ==
- "The Durinis" @ Storia di Milano
- Biography of Durini by Nicola Raponi, from the Dizionario Biografico degli Italiani @ Treccani
