= Emilio Cavenaghi =

Italian painter (1852–1876)

Emilio Cavenaghi (1852–1876) was an Italian painter of landscapes and genre pieces He was born in Caravaggio. He studied under Giuseppe Bertini. La Stanza Poldi and The Music Amateur are two of his best works. Cavenaghi also designed many woodcuts for book-illustrations. He painted the decorations and sipario (curtain) of Teatro Manzoni. He died in Milan in 1876.

He appears to be a sibling to Luigi Cavenaghi (Caravaggio, August 8, 1844 – Milano, December 7, 1918).
