= Angelo Filippetti =

Italian politician (1866–1936)

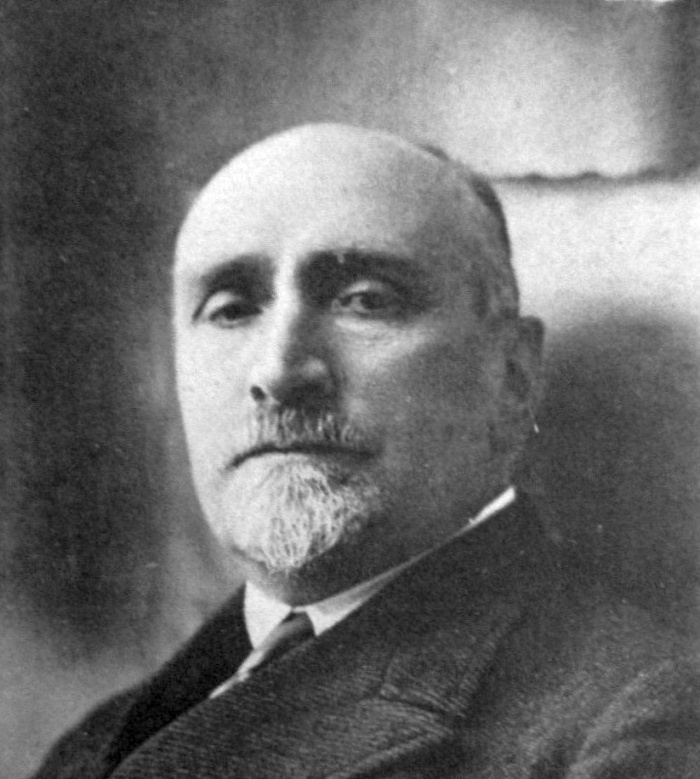

Angelo Filippetti (26 January 1866 – 10 October 1936) was an Italian politician and doctor who served as the Mayor of Milan from 1920 to 1922. A member of the Italian Socialist Party (PSI), Filippetti was dismissed by the Royal Prefect Alfredo Lusignoli on 3 August 1922 after members of the Blackshirts occupied Milan's city hall, the Palazzo Marino. Lusignoli appointed a prefectural commissioner, Count Ferdinando Lalli, as Filippetti's replacement.

Political offices
Preceded by Emilio Caldara	Mayor of Milan; 1920–1922	Succeeded by Ferdinando Lalli as Commissario prefettizio
