= Louis Renault (jurist) =

French jurist and Nobel Prize recipient (1843–1918)

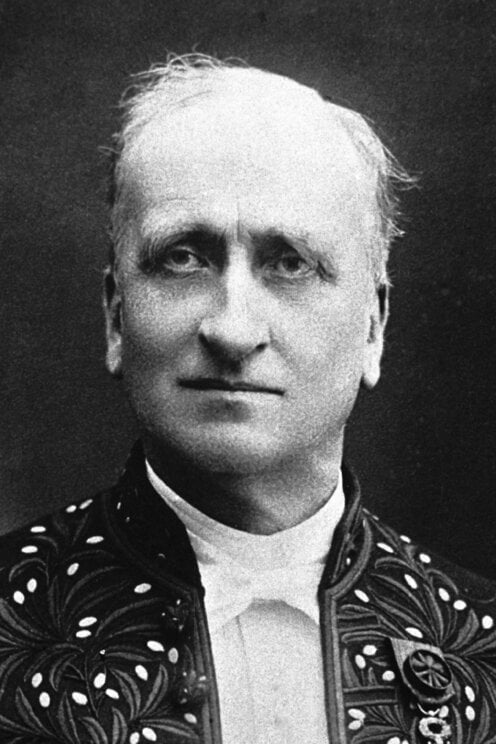
- Renault in 1907
- Born: 21 May 1843; Autun, France
- Died: 8 February 1918 (aged 74); Barbizon, France
- Awards: Nobel Peace Prize (1907)

Louis Renault (21 May 1843 – 8 February 1918) was a French jurist and educator, and the co-winner in 1907 (with Ernesto Teodoro Moneta) of the Nobel Peace Prize.

Renault was born at Autun. From 1868 to 1873, Renault was professor of Roman and commercial law at the University of Dijon. From 1873 until his death, he was professor in the faculty of law at the Paris Institute of Political Studies (Sciences Po) and the University of Paris, where in 1881 he became professor of international law. In 1890, he was appointed jurisconsult of the Ministry of Foreign Affairs, a post created for him in which he scrutinized French foreign policy in the light of international law. He served at numerous conferences in this capacity, notably at the two Hague Conventions (1899 and 1907) and the London Naval Conference (1908–1909).

Renault was prominent as an arbitrator, his more famous cases including the Japanese House Tax case of 1905, the Casa Blanca Case of 1909, the Sarvarkar Case of 1911, the Carthage case of 1913, and the Manouba case of 1913. Among his writings are articles and monographs on the specialized topics of international law. Together with his friend and colleague C. Lyon-Caen, he produced several works on commercial law, including a compendium in two volumes, a treatise in eight volumes, and a manual that ran to many editions.

In 1879, Renault published his Introduction to the Study of International Law and in 1917 First Violations of International Law by Germany, concerning the invasion of Belgium and of Luxembourg in breach of Germany's treaty obligations.

== Honors and awards ==
Commander of the Order of Legion of Honour

== Bibliography ==
- Nobel winners page
