= Emilio Caldara =

Italian politician

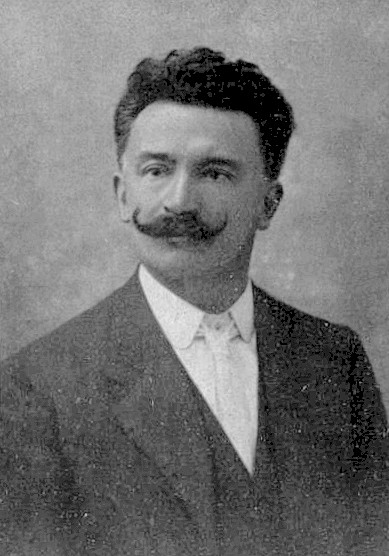
Emilio Caldara

Emilio Caldara (20 January 1868 – 31 October 1942) was an Italian Socialist Party politician. He was also a member of the Unitary Socialist Party. He was mayor of Milan.

| Preceded by Emanuele Greppi | Mayor of Milan; 1914–1920 | Succeeded by Angelo Filippetti |

== See also ==
- Mayor of Milan
