= Monument to Ernesto Teodoro Moneta =

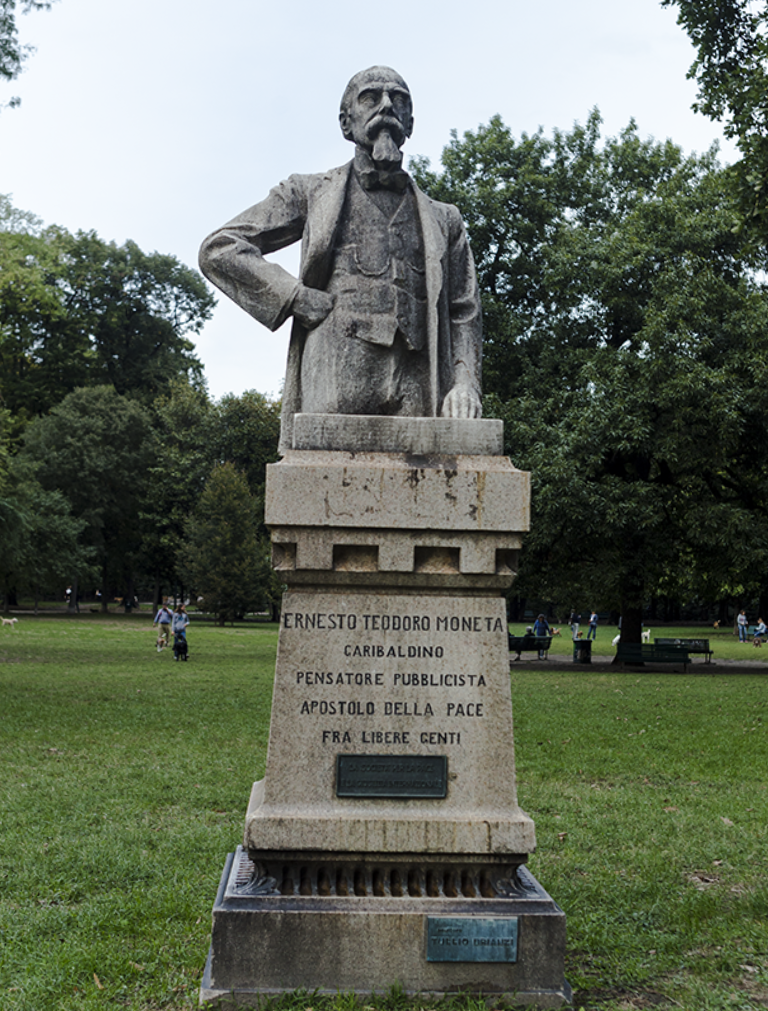
- The monument in 2017
- Medium: Sculpture
- Subject: Ernesto Teodoro Moneta
- Location: Milan
- 45.4736°N 9.1981°E

A monument to Ernesto Teodoro Moneta is installed in Milan, Italy.
