= Giovanni Greppi =

Italian footballer

Personal information
- Date of birth: 6 August 1910
- Place of birth: Pezzana, Italy
- Date of death: 26 November 1980 (aged 70)
- Position: Midfielder

Senior career*
| Years | Team | Apps | (Gls) |
| 1928–1930 | Juventus | 5 | (0) |
| 1930–1932 | Siracusa | | |
| 1932–1933 | Acireale | | |
| 1933–1936 | Biellese | 84 | (0) |
| 1936–1940 | Varese | 108 | (0) |
- * Club domestic league appearances and goals

Giovanni Greppi (6 August 1910 – 26 November 1980) was an Italian professional football player.
