= Paolo Pillitteri =

Italian politician, film critic and journalist (1940–2024)

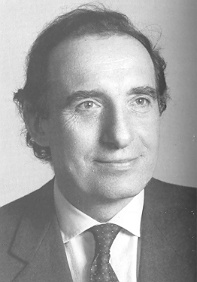
- Pillitteri in the 1990s

Mayor of Milan
- In office 21 December 1986 – 18 January 1992
- Preceded by: Carlo Tognoli
- Succeeded by: Giampiero Borghini

Member of the Chamber of Deputies
- In office 23 April 1992 – 14 April 1994
- In office 12 July 1983 – 1 July 1987
- Constituency: Milan

Personal details
- Born: Gian Paolo Pillitteri; 5 December 1940 Sesto Calende, Italy
- Died: 5 December 2024 (aged 84) Milan, Italy
- Party: PSI (1966–1969, 1976–1994); PSDI (1969–1975)
- Spouses: Rosilde Craxi (m. 1965; died 2017); Cinzia Gelati (m. 2022)
- Children: 2
- Education: University of Milan
- Occupation: Politician; film critic; journalist

Gian Paolo Pillitteri (5 December 1940 – 5 December 2024) was an Italian politician, film critic, and journalist. He was affiliated with the Italian Socialist Party (PSI) and the Italian Democratic Socialist Party (PSDI). Pillitteri began his political career when the PSI and PSDI were unified. Following the 1969 party split, he joined the PSDI, which at the time was known as the Unitary Socialist Party (PSU), before it became the PSDI in 1971.

After returning to the PSI in 1976, Pillitteri served in the Chamber of Deputies in the Legislature IX (1983–1987) and Legislature XI (1992–1994). In 1985, he was elected as mayor by the City Council of Milan. He held this position until 1992. His political career ended due his involvement and subsequent conviction in the Tangentopoli scandal.

== Early life and education ==
Gian Paolo Pillitteri was born on 5 December 1940 in Sesto Calende, in the province of Varese; he had Sicilian origins. His father was a marshal of the Carabinieri and a monarchist but was active in the Italian Resistance, while his mother Zelia was from Valtellina. The young Pillitteri studied at the Salesians of Sondrio. He attended the Berchet High School in Milan, where he met his future wife. He recalled that "the first time I saw Milan was in 1946, I had recently moved with my family from Valtellina, we were displaced in Porta Vittoria. My father took me on a bicycle to visit the city. I was deeply affected by the houses torn apart by the bombs. I just couldn't recognize the Milan of my father's stories among that rubble, and when I saw the destroyed Gallery I burst into tears: as if a dream I had been pursuing for years had been lost forever. My father told me: 'don't worry, very soon everything will be rebuilt'. And so it was. For Milan it is still this: a great ability to never give up, to adapt to the new, the will to adapt and change."

Pillitteri was one of the young people who walked seventy kilometers in England in one of the peace marches promoted by Bertrand Russell. He recalled that "the first of these marches was spontaneous, I remember that Guido Piovene was also there, only later, when there started to appear the party flags, I no longer participated." He graduated in literature at the University of Milan and became a journalist. From his university years, his passion for cinema also manifested itself. He was president of the Milan University Film Centre. Having completed his studies, Pillitteri began his activity as a journalist and film critic, and collaborated with Avanti!, Mondoperaio, and Critica Sociale.

== Career ==
After having worked as a journalist, film critic, and cultural animator (he created one of the first film clubs in Milan), Pillitteri began his political career within the PSI. The PSI–PSDI's unification led to the establishment of the PSU. Following a split in 1969, he joined the PSDI and in 1970 became part of the Milan councilor for culture. During his mandate, the city went through a moment of great artistic and cultural vivacity. Among the exhibitions held in those years there was the one dedicated to nouveau realism, which culminated with Christo's installations in Piazza del Duomo in Milan. Ten years after its foundation, Pillitteri, Pierre Restany, and Guido Le Noci organized a festival to celebrate the tenth anniversary of its birth.

In 1975, with the PSI's autonomist turn looming, Pillitteri founded the Unitary Movement of Socialist Initiative, which merged into the PSI on the threshold of the "revolution of the forty-year-olds" that in July 1976 brought Bettino Craxi to the party secretariat. As councilor with responsibility for private construction, he developed the general master plan of Milan. He was an uninterrupted member of the municipal council for over a decade until 1980, also holding the position of councilor with responsibility for the budget. Following his appointment as regional secretary of the PSI, he was elected as a deputy in the 1983 Italian general election, remaining in this position for eleven years until 1994.

Pillitteri became mayor of Milan, succeeding fellow PSI member Carlo Tognoli on 21 December 1986, at the helm of a municipal council that saw the political alliance with Christian Democracy (DC), following the coalition of the Pentapartito. In 1987, following disagreements with the DC, an unprecedented red–red–green coalition was launched by the PSI with the Italian Communist Party and the Federation of the Greens. In the 1990 Italian local elections, he achieved significant personal success as the PSI achieved 20% of the votes in Milan. He later recalled that in the 1980s Milan was a capital city, where the likes of Mikhail Gorbachev, the 14th Dalai Lama, and future King Charles III came to the city. Pillitteri was re-elected as a deputy in the 1992 Italian general election, the last of the First Italian Republic. During his time as a deputy, he was a member of the IV Commission for Defense, the VII Commission of Education, and XII Commission for Social Affairs. He also presented a total of 51 bills.

In early May 1992, Pillitteri received, together with Tognoli, a warning for the crime of receiving stolen goods in relation to 500 million lire, as part of the Mani pulite investigation. He was definitively convicted of the crime, with a sentence set at two years and six months by the Court of Appeal of Milan in 1996. He was initially sentenced to four years and six months for receiving stolen goods and illegal financing, which means he would have gone to prison; his lawyers managed to reopen negotiations on the decree of execution of the sentence until it was reduced to three years, which was the limit that avoids prison time, and thus Pillitteri was sentenced to community services. According to the prosecution, he had collected 650 million lire of bribes from executives from Aem, the municipal electricity company, another 100 million from Mario Chiesa, and 7 million from Matteo Carriera, the owner of IPAB, the charitable institute best known for the benefits offered to the general staff of the PSI. Since then, he returned to his journalistic career; he also hosted programs on small broadcasters and was often a guest commentator. In 2022, he called the Mani pulite investigative pool the Great Caesura, and said: "Since politics is a generic, elusive fact, to eliminate it they struck at its incarnation: the parties. With Tangentopoli, politics was mortally wounded: first they criminalized it and then, in a continuous process of devaluation, we arrived at today's indistinct magma."

Parallel to his twenty-five year political career within the PSI, Pillitteri collaborated with several important socialist newspapers, such as Avanti!, and was also co-director of the newspaper L'Opinione delle Libertà. He was a professor of film history at the IULM University of Milan and a prolific author of books and essays concerning cinema and political activity, including among others Anna Kuliscioff (1986), Maestri Autori Eventi (1986), Fra suspense e psicanalisi. Il cinema di Alfred Hitchcock (1991), Un cuore grande così: Edmondo De Amicis (1989), Cinema come politica (1992), Io li conoscevo bene (1994), La Baracca di Fellini (1995), Il cinema tra fiction e falsità. Simili, facsimili, quasi falsi, falsi storici. Quando il cinema all'italiana manipola la nostra storia (2000) Evìto. Dos pesos y dos misuras (2002) Quando Benedetto divenne Bettino (2007) Non è vero ma ci credo. Immagini, simulacri, inganni (2009), and Luca Comerio. Milanese. Fotografo, pioniere e padre del cinema italiano (2011), and Tutto poteva accadere (2015). In 2022, Pillitteri was head of the press office of MM, the Milan metro company.

== Electoral history ==
Election	House	Constituency	Party	Votes	Result
1983	Chamber of Deputies	Milan–Pavia	PSI	17,889	Elected
1992	Chamber of Deputies	Milan–Pavia	PSI	27,293	Elected

== Personal life and death ==
In 1965, Pillitteri married Rosilde Craxi, sister of the former PSI leader Bettino Craxi; their marriage lasted until her death in 2017. His son Stefano Pillitteri, a criminal lawyer, was a municipal councilor in Milan for Forza Italia (FI). He had responsibility for quality, citizen services, civic services, and regulatory simplification within the centre-right coalition municipal council (FI/The People of Freedom–Northern League) led by mayor Letizia Moratti for five years from 5 June 2006 until 1 June 2011; his daughter Maria Vittoria also held various important roles in Mediaset. On 10 June 2022, Pillitteri remarried to Cinzia Gelati, a journalist from Canegrate; they were initially supposed to marry in February 2022 but Pillitteri was ill and had been hospitalized at the San Raffaele Hospital in Milan. Pillitteri died in Milan on 5 December 2024, his 84th birthday.

Pilitteri met Silvio Berlusconi in 1978. An Inter Milan supporter, he said that the only quarrel with his second wife was that she was a supporter of Inter Milan rival Juventus.
