= Antonio Greppi (writer) =

Italian politician, writer, and dramaturge

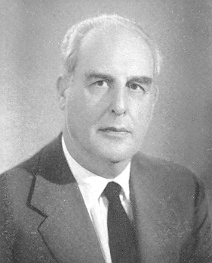
Antonio Greppi

Antonio Greppi (26 June 1884, in Angera – 22 October 1982, in Milan) was an Italian writer, politician and dramaturge who served as Mayor of Milan from 1945 to 1951. He was the first mayor of Milan after its liberation in April 1945.

Political offices
Preceded by Mario Colombo as podestà of Milan	Mayor of Milan; 1945–1951	Succeeded by Virgilio Ferrari
