= Emanuele Greppi =

Italian lawyer, politician, and historian

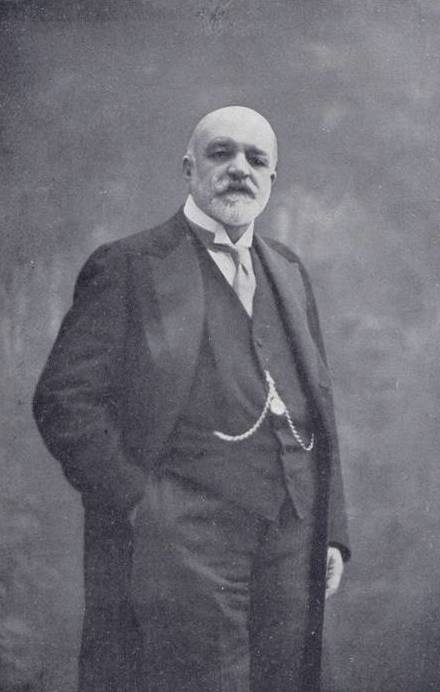
Emanuele Greppi

Emanuele Greppi (27 November 1853 – 9 January 1931), 6th Count of Bussero and Corneliano was an Italian lawyer, politician and historian who served as the Mayor of Milan from 1911 to 1913. He also served in the Senate of the Kingdom of Italy. Following Greppi's resignation on 4 December 1913, the Royal Prefect Filiberto Olgiati assumed administration of Milan until Emilio Caldara took office on 18 June 1914.

Political offices
Preceded by Cesare Gallotti as Commissario prefettizio	Mayor of Milan; 1911–1913	Succeeded by Filiberto Olgiati as Commissario regio
