= Virgilio Ferrari =

Italian politician (1888–1975)

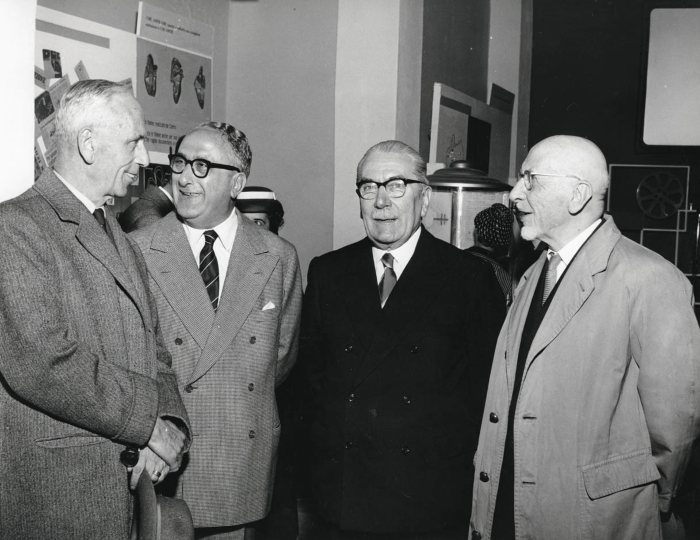
Virgilio Ferrari with black coat in 1957

Virgilio Ferrari (9 March 1888 – 12 June 1975) was an Italian Democratic Socialist Party politician. He was mayor of Milan. He was appointed Knight Grand Cross of the Order of Merit of the Italian Republic.

Preceded by Antonio Greppi	Mayor of Milan; 1951–1961	Succeeded by Gino Cassinis
