= Barona (district of Milan) =

Coordinates: 45°26′24″N 9°09′21″E

- Quartiere of Milan
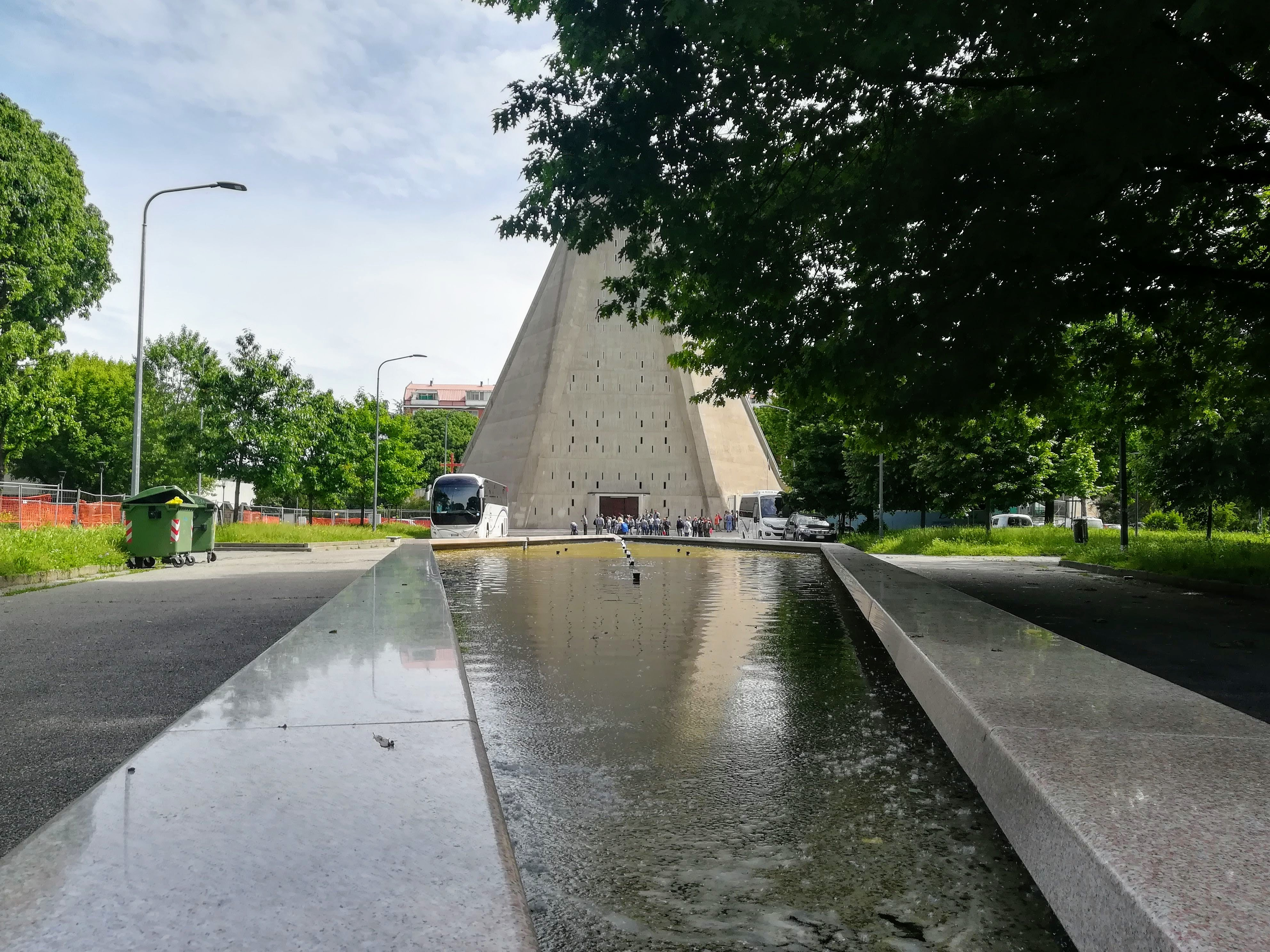
- View of a small square in the neighborhood culminating with the church of San Giovanni Bono.
- Interactive map of Barona
- Country: Italy
- Region: Lombardy
- Province: Milan
- Comune: Milan
- Zone: 6
- Time zone: UTC+1 (CET)
  - Summer (DST): UTC+2 (CEST)

Barona is a border district ("quartiere") of the city of Milan, Italy. It is part of the Zone 6 administrative division, and it is located south of the city centre. Its population can be roughly estimated to 85,000 (official data are not available as districts are not formal divisions). It borders on the comunes of Buccinasco, Assago, and Corsico and the districts of Lorenteggio and Torretta. Its boundaries are marked by the Parco Agricolo Sud Milano nature reserve to the south, by the Naviglio Grande and Naviglio Pavese canals to the east and to the west, and by the Circonvallazione ring road to the north (more specifically, by the Viale Cassala and Viale Tibaldi avenues).

Barona is a mainly residential district, and one of those having a higher proportion of green areas still devoted to agriculture. The most typical features of the agricultural areas in Barona, as well as in the neighbouring semi-rural districts and communes, are the water-meadows and paddy fields.

It has two main urban sub-districts, Sant'Ambrogio I and Sant'Ambrogio II. Sant'Ambrogio I has landmark, curvy buildings, constructed in the 1960s, housing about 5,000 people. Sant'Ambrogio II developed between the 1960s and 1970s and has prefabricated apartment buildings of simpler design. The district includes two well known community centres, Barrio's and Villaggio Barona.

== History ==
A settlement in the area of Barona is reported since the 2nd millennium BC, when the area was inhabited by Ligures; archaeological findings from this early settlement are exhibited in the Sforza Castle Museum. The older reference to the name "Barona" is from a 973 document, now preserved in the Curia Arcivescovile di Milano archives, where the place is mentioned as Vicus Baronis, i.e., "town of the Baron". In Roman times, the area including Barona and adjacent rural towns was called "Pomerio", meaning "after the walls", with reference to the Walls of Milan; later on the area was renamed Corpi Santi ("Holy Bodies"), as the Milanese would bury their dead past the city walls, in the surrounding country. Corpi Santi formally became a comune in the 18th century, and in the 20th century it was annexed to Milan.

Until the early decades of the 20th century, Barona was an agricultural area, characterized by water-meadows established by the Benedictine monks. After World War I the district quickly turned into an urban and industrial area.

In the 1960s, the Barona district received much media attention as it was the scene of many killings by far left-wing terrorist Cesare Battisti.

== Transportation ==
The district benefits several public transportation services, including two stops of the Milan Metro subway, tramways, and buses, connecting it to the city centre. There are also interurban buses connecting the district to Corsico, Rosate and Buccinasco.

== Services ==
Barona houses one of the leading hospitals of Milan, Ospedale San Paolo, as well as branches of three universities, the Università degli Studi di Milano (faculty of Medicine), IULM and NABA (academy of arts).

== Monuments ==
The district has several relevant churches, including a sanctuary named after Saint Rita of Cascia, the church of Saints Nazarius and Celsus, dating back to at least the 14th century, and the church of San Marchetto (16th century). In the southern part of the district, that is partially included in the Parco Agricolo Sud Milano reserve, there are several notable cascine (ancient farmhouses), some of which date back to the 17th century.

== References in popular culture ==
The popular Italian pop band 883 mentions Barona in the song "Cumuli", from the 1993 album Nord sud ovest est. The 2003 independent Italian movie Chemical Hunger is set in Barona, although some scenes have been shot in other peripheral districts of Milan, such as Quarto Oggiaro and Bonola.
