= Zone 6 of Milan =

Coordinates: 45.440087°N 9.155924°E

Zona 6 di Milano Municipality 6
- Municipality of Milan
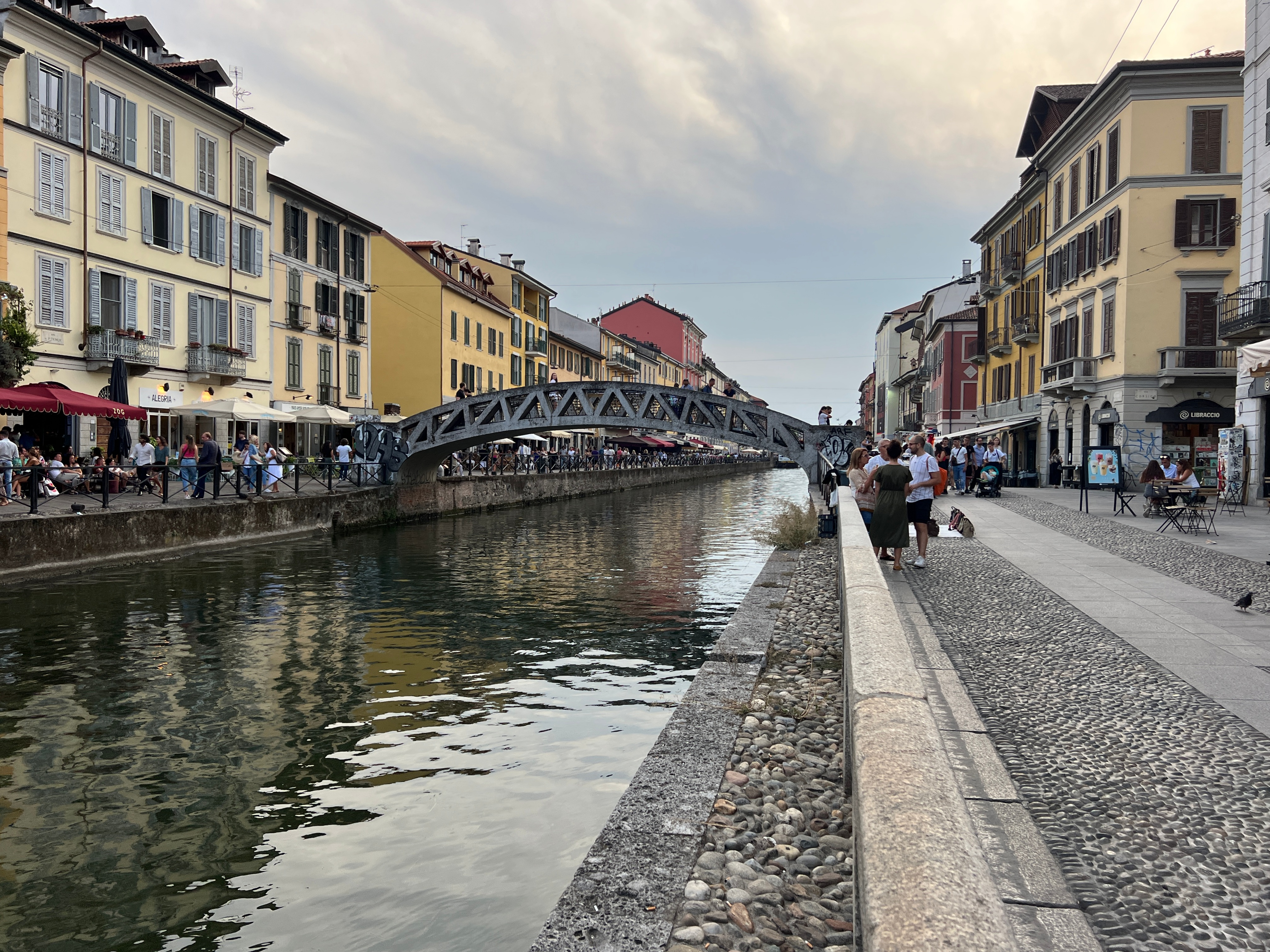
- Naviglio Grande in Porta Genova district

- Location of Municipality 6 of Milan
- Country: Italy
- Region: Lombardy
- Province: Metro City of Milan
- Comune: Milan

Government
  - President: Santo Minniti (PD)

Area
  - Total: 7.06 sq mi (18.28 km^{2})

Population (2022)
  - Total: 150,159
- Time zone: UTC+1 (CET)
  - Summer (DST): UTC+2 (CEST)
- Website: Municipality 6

The Zone 6 of Milan, since 2016 officially Municipality 6 of Milan, (in Italian: Zona 6 di Milano, Municipio 6 di Milano) is one of the 9 administrative divisions of Milan, Italy.

It was officially created as an administrative subdivision during the 1980s. On 14 April 2016, in order to promote a reform on the municipal administrative decentralization, the City Council of Milan established the new Municipality 6, a new administrative body responsible for running most local services, such as schools, social services, waste collection, roads, parks, libraries and local commerce.

On 5 March 1999 the new Zone 6, which corresponds to the south-western part of the city, was made up by the union of the previous Zones 16 (Barona, Ronchetto sul Naviglio), 17 (Lorenteggio, Inganni), and 5 (Porta Ticinese, Porta Genova).

== Subdivision ==
The borough includes the following districts:

- Arzaga, settlements related to a cascina a corte demolished in 1966;
- Barona, a former agricultural area, characterized by water-meadows established by the Benedictine monks, now an urban and industrial district;
- Giambellino-Lorenteggio, a rural area until the late 19th century, when the territory was still partitioned into several cascine. In 1923 Lorenteggio was annexed to Milan, and a quick urbanization and industrialization process started. The industrial development of the area was boosted by the construction of the railway connecting Milan to the south-west of Lombardy. Massive construction of apartment blocks in Lorenteggio began in the mid 20th century. The district today is completely urban;
- Porta Genova, named after a city gate of the old Spanish Walls of Milan, namely that leading to Genoa. The only remnants of the old gate are the small buildings that used to house the customs offices, which replaced the Spanish gate in the 19th Century. The district is centered in Piazza Cantore, where the city gate used to be, and the Porta Genova railway station, the oldest Milanese railway station to be still in operation. Since the station is in the centre of Porta Genova, the district is divided in two parts by the railway; an old iron bridge connecting the two sides known as "la scaletta" (the "ladder"), located next to the station, is one of the traditional landmarks of the district. The district is also characterized by the Navigli canals and the Darsena (the old dock), where two major Navigli meet, namely the Naviglio Grande and the Naviglio Pavese. As a consequence, much of the district is traversed by watercourses. The district is also extremely popular with the Milanese youth, both for the night-life (especially along the banks of the Naviglio) and its anti-conformist atmosphere;
- Porta Ticinese, named after a city gate of the old Spanish Walls of Milan, namely that leading to the Ticino river. The district is part of the Navigli area, rich of monuments, tourist attractions, night life, and qualifies as one of the most important areas of Milan outside the historic centre. It includes the notable Basilica of Sant'Eustorgio, a basilica that was established in the Middle Ages and restored several times through the centuries, so that the original romanesque structure has been complemented with Renaissance elements. Sant'Eustorgio is located in a well known city park called Parco delle Basiliche, which also includes another prominent basilica, that of San Lorenzo. Nearby are also the Colonne di San Lorenzo, which are among the best preserved Roman ruins in Milan. The plaza where the Colonne di San Lorenzo are located is also one of the key places of the so-called "Milanese movida" (night-life);
- Ronchetto sul Naviglio, autonomous comune until 1870, and a frazione of Buccinasco between 1870 and 1923, when it was annexed to Milan;

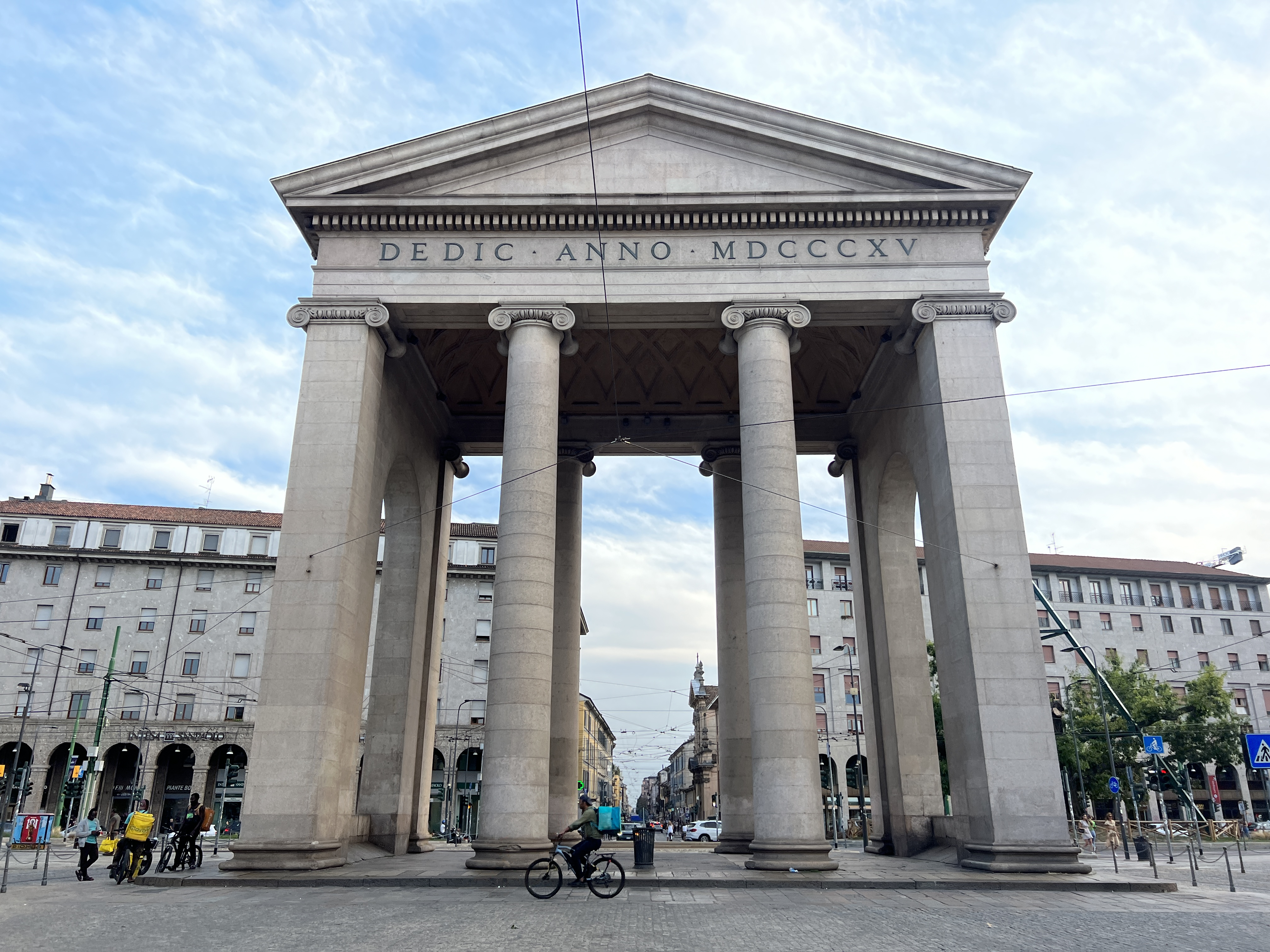
Porta Ticinese.

- Boffalora;
- Cascina Bianca;
- Conchetta;
- Creta;
- Foppette;
- Lodovico il Moro;
- Moncucco;
- San Cristoforo;
- Sant'Ambrogio;
- Teramo;
- Villa Magentino;
- Villaggio dei Fiori.

=== Darsena ===
The borough's famous Navigli are still today connected to the Darsena, an artificial water basin located near Porta Ticinese which was used for the mooring and the storage of the boats. Considered one the most important junction for the commercial river traffic, the Darsena has two tributaries: Naviglio Grande and Naviglio Pavese. It measures 750 meters in length and 25 meters in width; it has an area of 17,500 square meters and a depth of one and a half meters.

Commissioned and built in 1603 as a transformation into a real port of the pre-existing Sant'Eustorgio lake by the Spanish governor Pedro Enríquez de Acevedo, the Darsena was used as commercial dock till 1979. After years of neglect, in 2015 it was renovated and reopened to the public. This renovation was carried out in view of the Expo 2015.

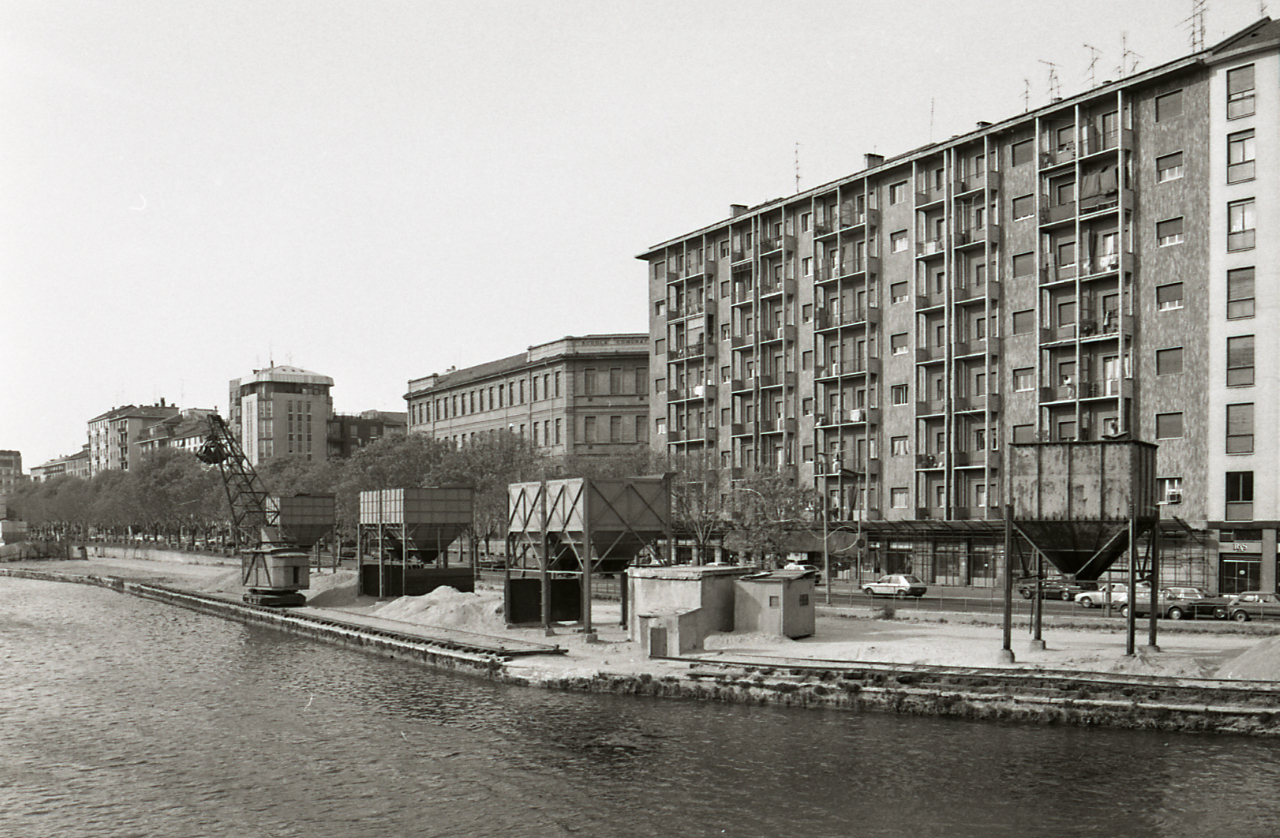
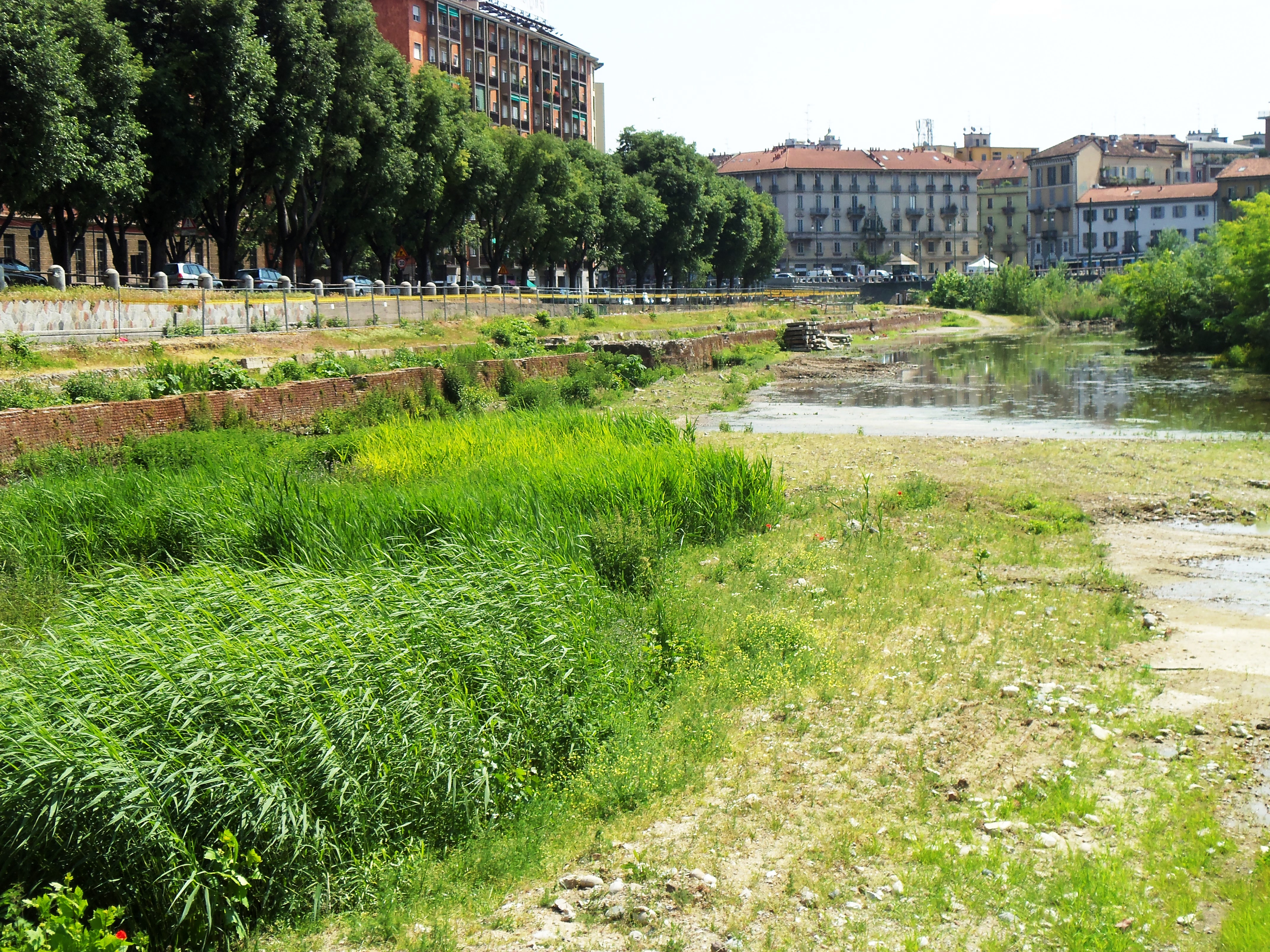
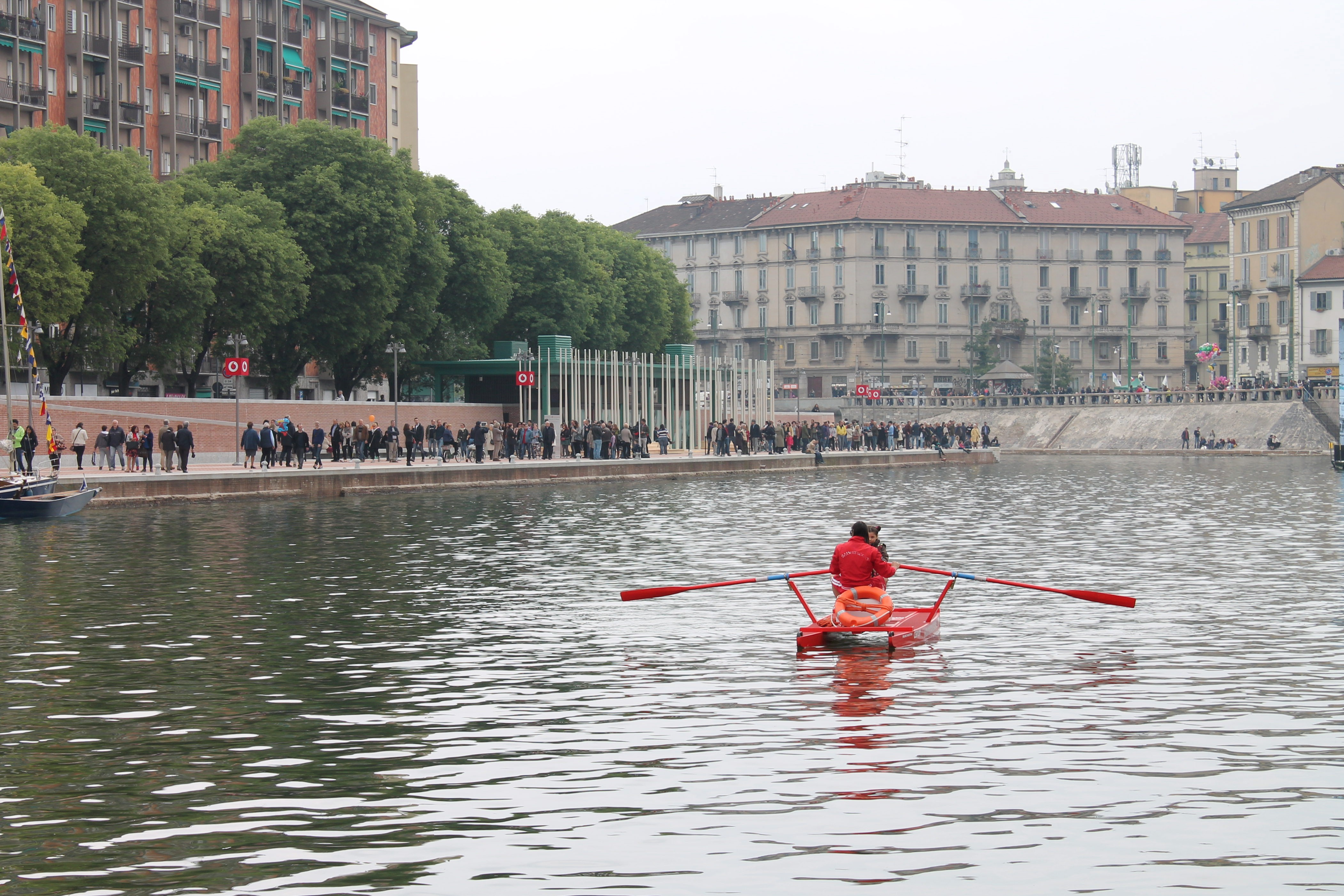
Historical evolution of the Darsena, here photographed in the early 1980s when it was a commercial dock (left), dry and abandoned in 2011 (centre) and restored as a pedestrian zone in 2015 (right).

== Municipal government ==
The area has its own local authority called Consiglio di Municipio (Municipal Council), composed by the President and 30 members directly elected by citizens every five years. The Council is responsible for most local services, such as schools, social services, waste collection, roads, parks, libraries and local commerce in the area, and manages funds (if any) provided by the city government for specific purposes, such as those intended to guarantee the right to education for poorer families.

The current President is Santo Minniti (PD), elected on 19 June 2016 and re-elected on 3–4 October 2021.

Here is the current composition of the Municipal Council after 2021 municipal election:

Alliance or political party	Members		Composition
Alliance or political party	2021–2026		Composition
Centre-left (PD-EV)	18	18 / 30	
Centre-right (FI-L-FdI-UDC)	10	10 / 30	
M5S	1	1 / 30	
Italexit	1	1 / 30	

Here is a full lists of the directly elected Presidents of Municipio since 2011:

President	Term of office		Party
Gabriele Rabaiotti	16 May 2011	27 June 2016	PD
Santo Minniti	27 June 2016	Incumbent	PD

== Education ==
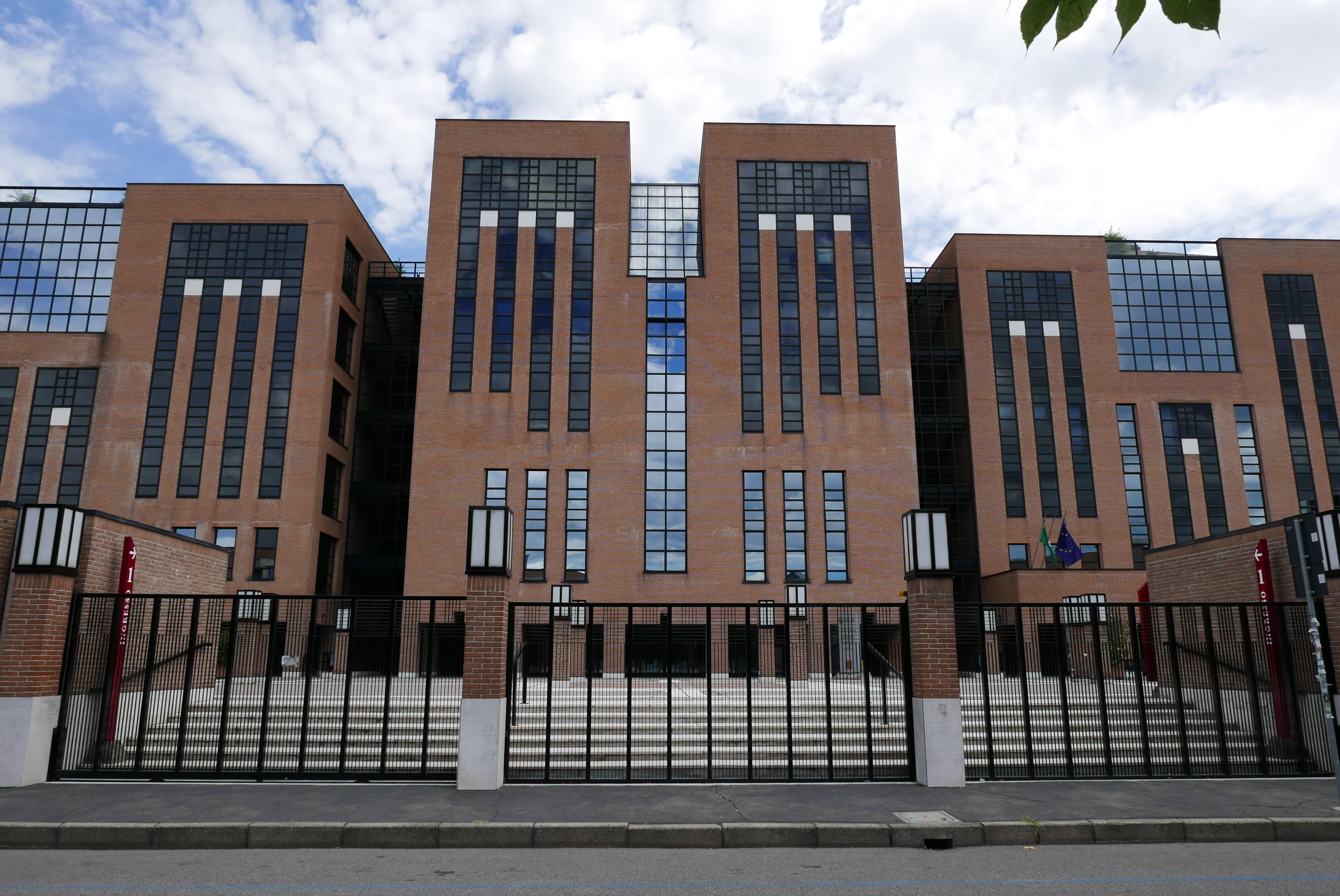
IULM University Campus

In this borough are located 22 primary schools, 15 secondary schools and 9 high schools. The most important university located in the borough is the IULM University, founded in 1968 by Carlo Bo.

== Transport ==
Stations of Milan Metro in the Zone 6:

- Bisceglie, Inganni, Primaticcio, Bande Nere;
- Famagosta, Porta Genova, Romolo;
- Coni Zugna, California, Bolivar, Tolstoj, Frattini, Gelsomini, Segneri, San Cristoforo FS.

Suburban railway stations in the Zone 6:

- Milano San Cristoforo
- Milano Romolo

== Gallery ==
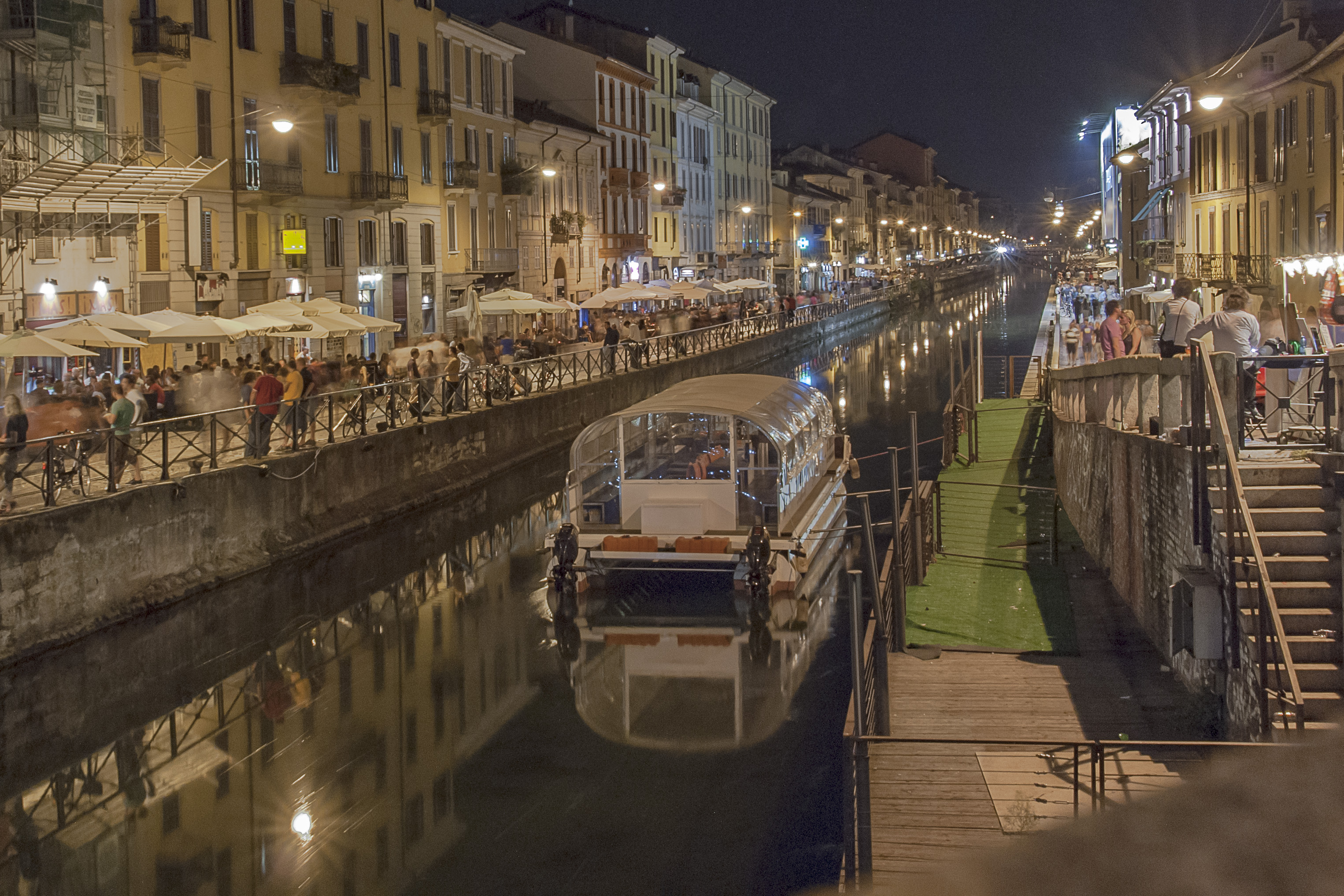
Navigli night-life

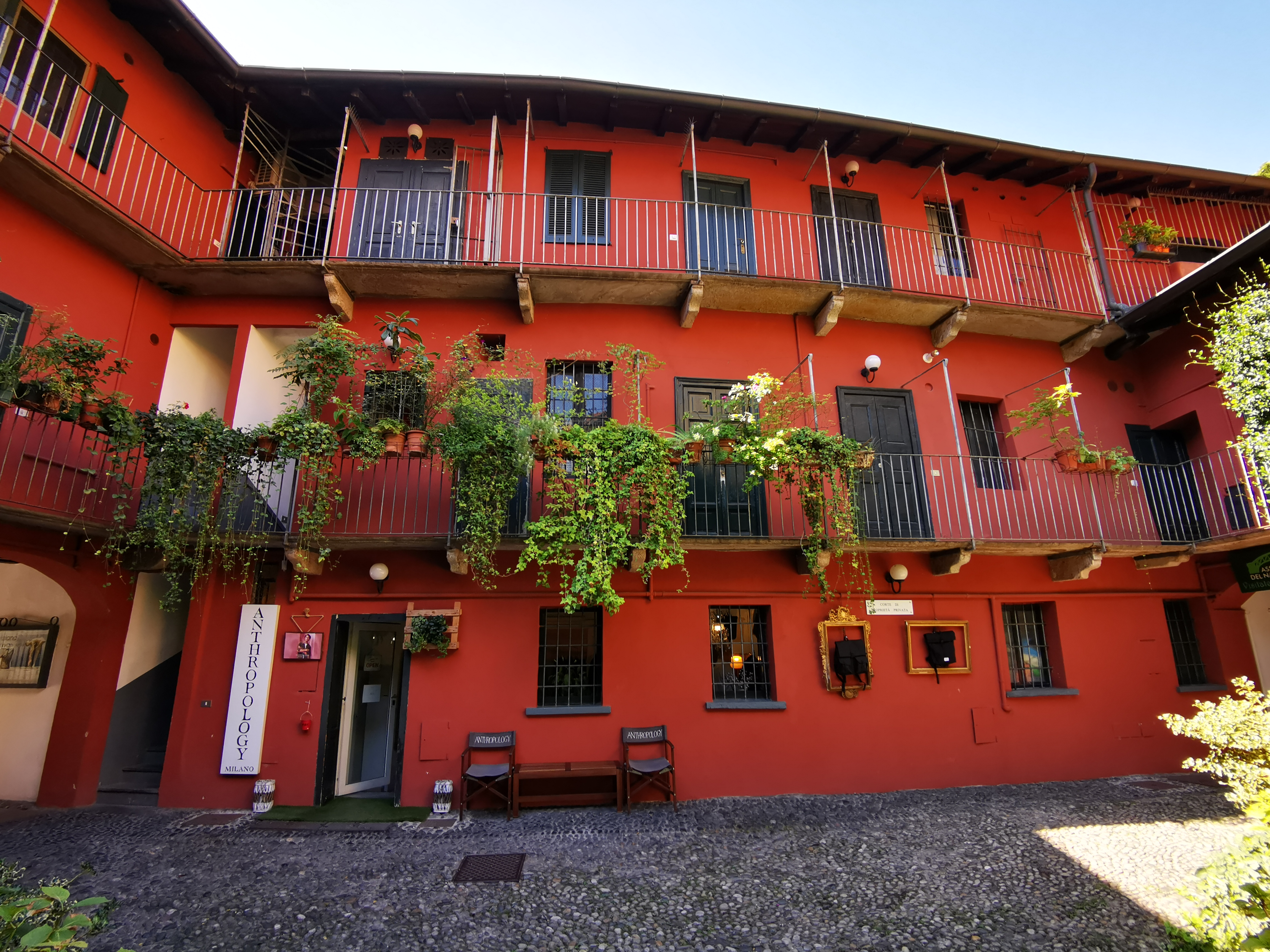
Typical casa di ringhiera

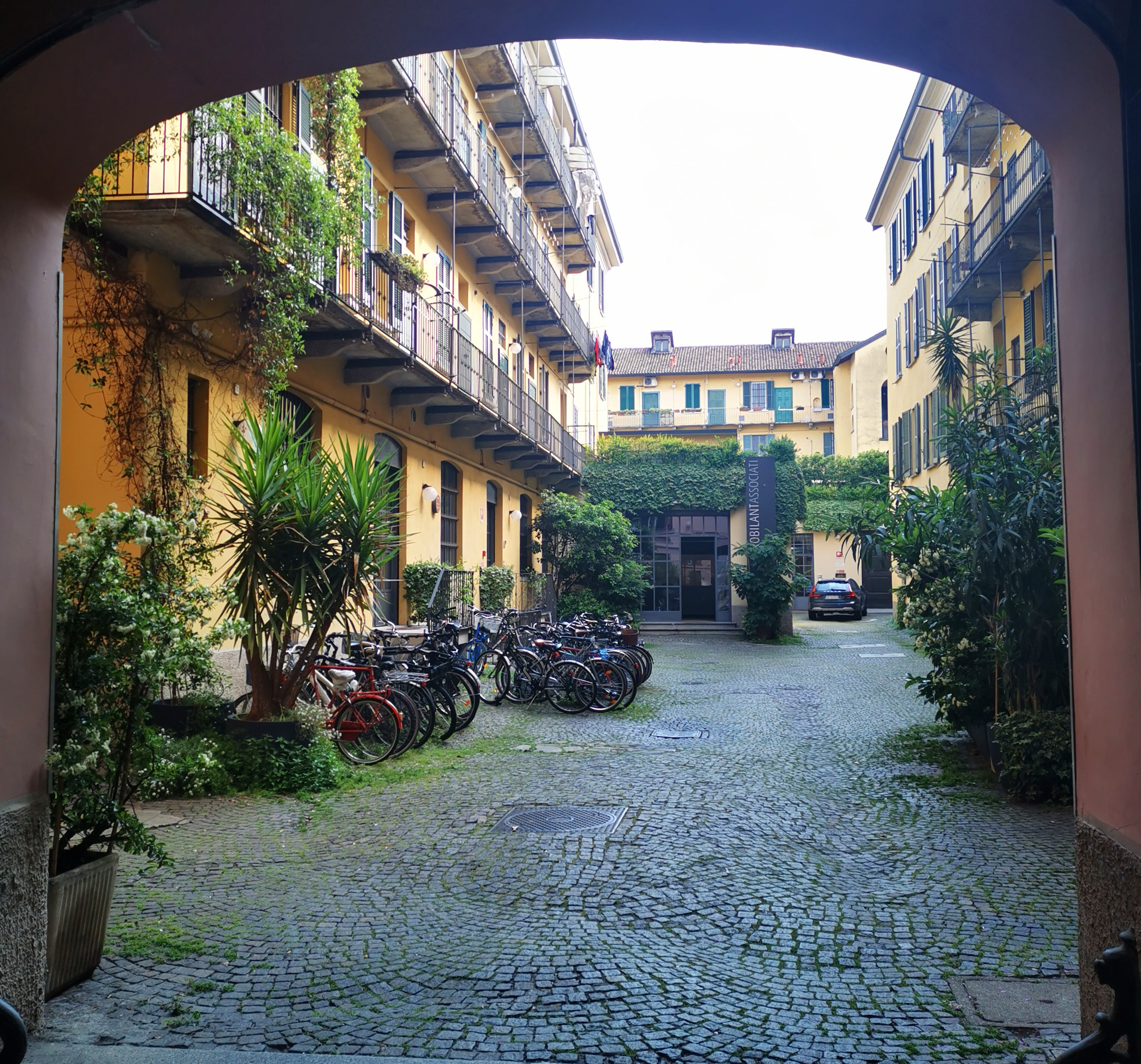
Typical casa di ringhiera in Porta Ticinese district

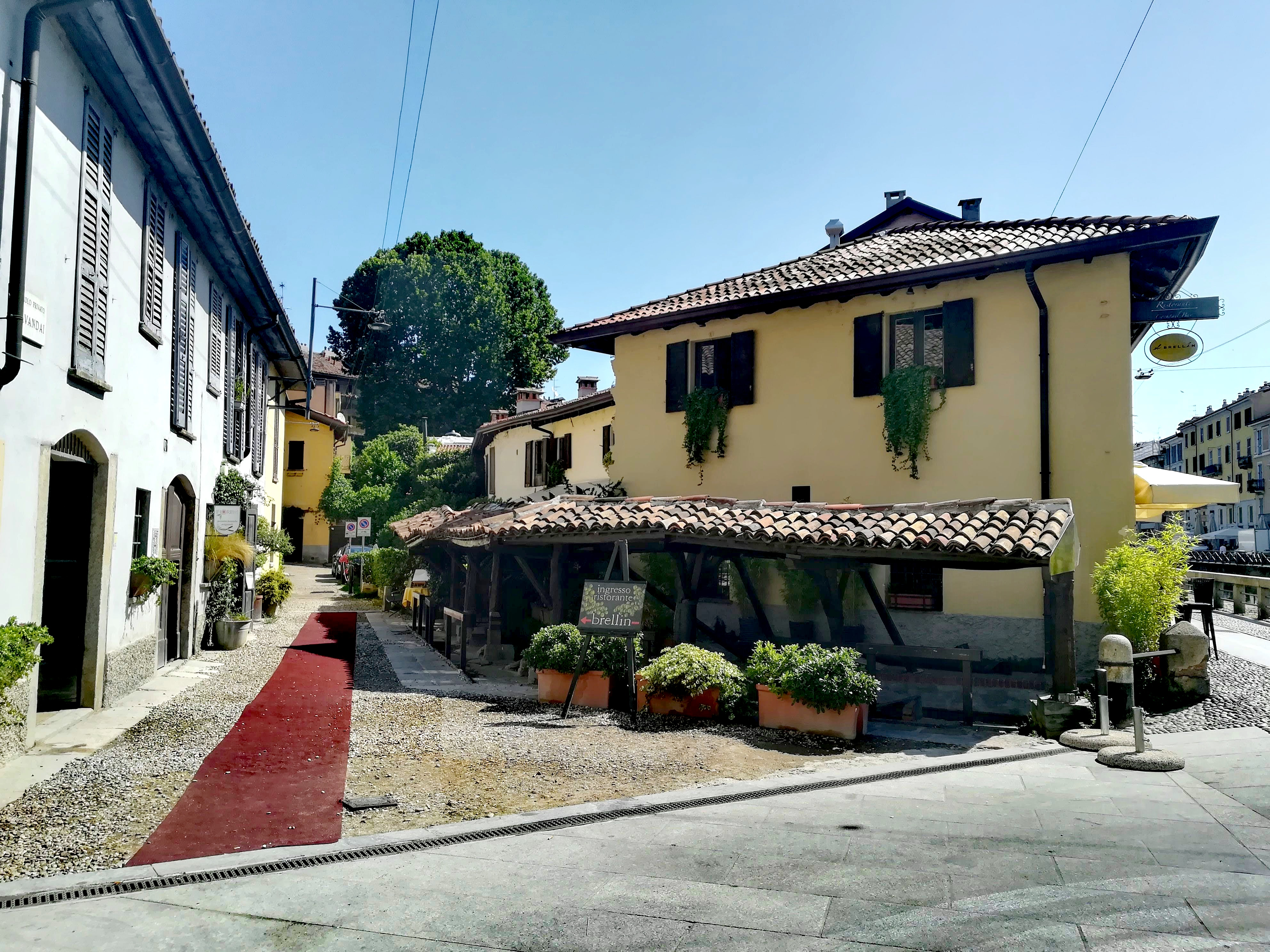
Ancient public laundry in Porta Genova district

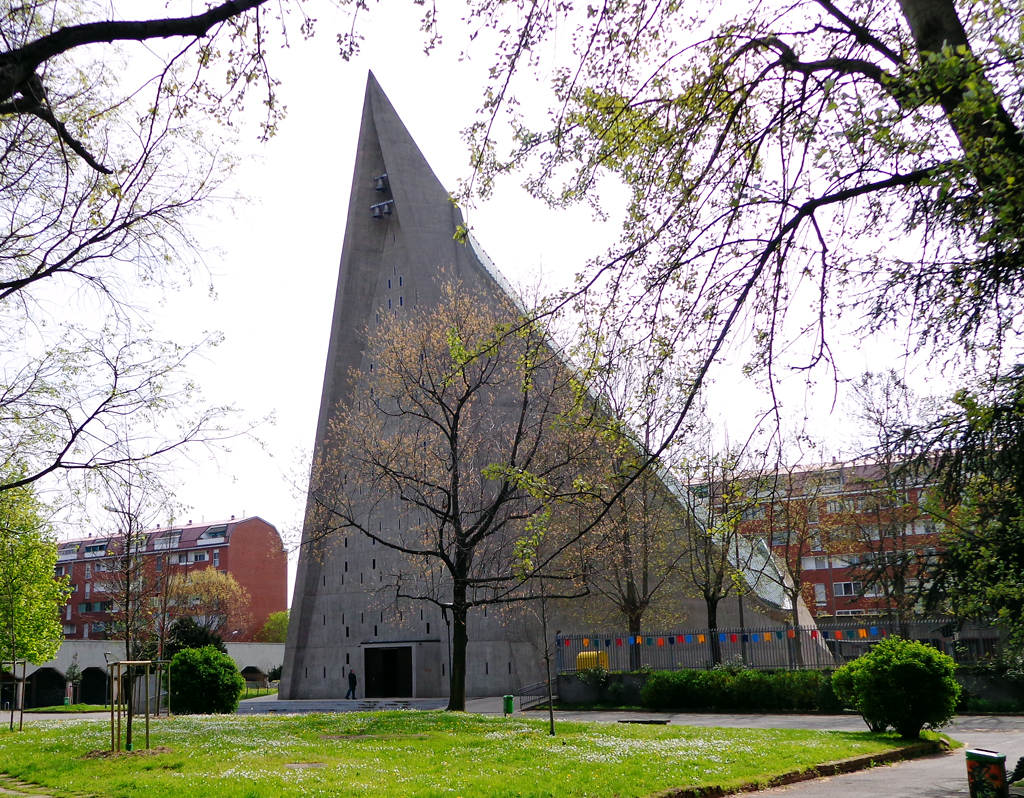
San Giovanni Bono Church in Sant'Ambrogio district

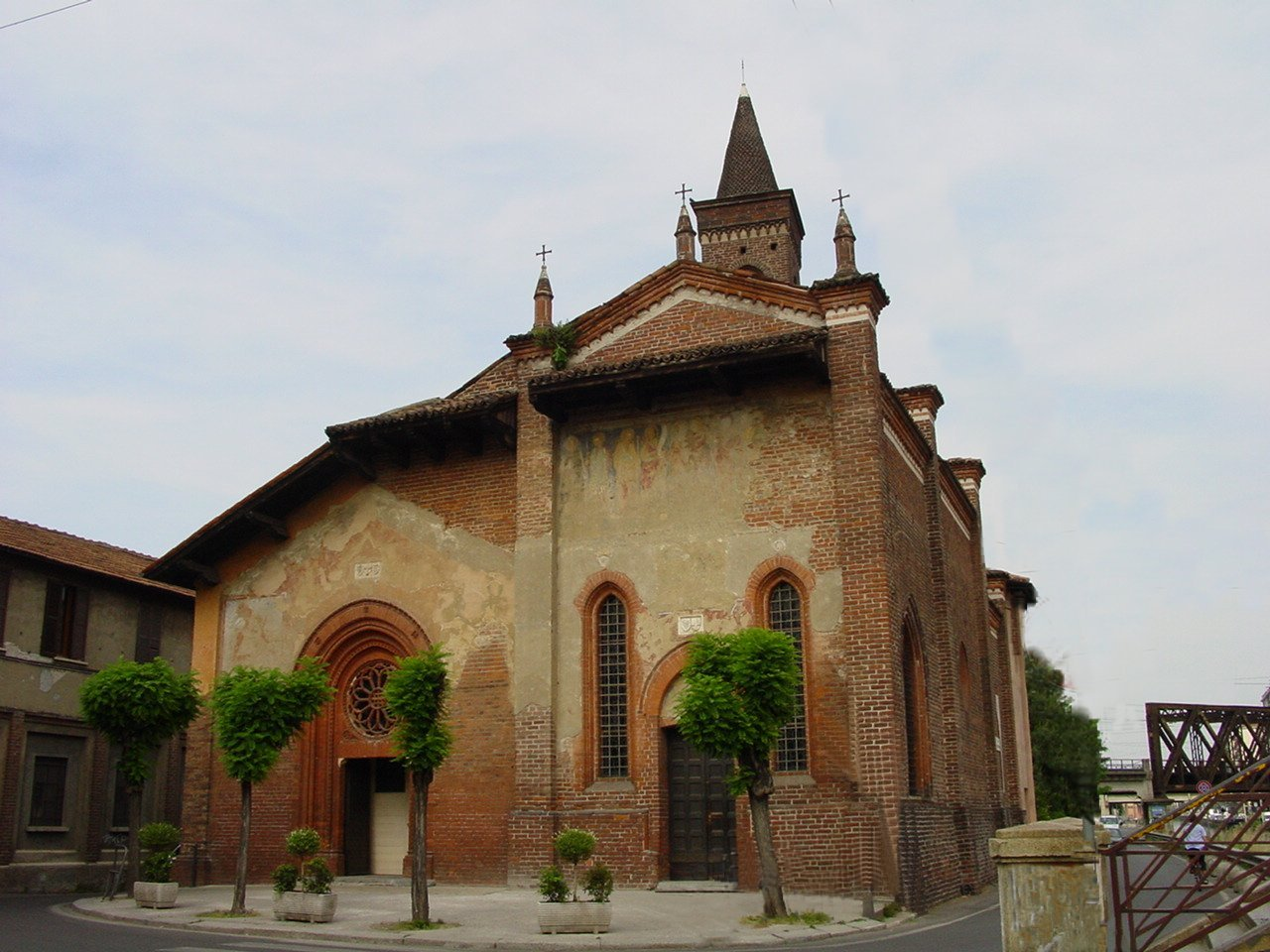
San Cristoforo sul Naviglio Church

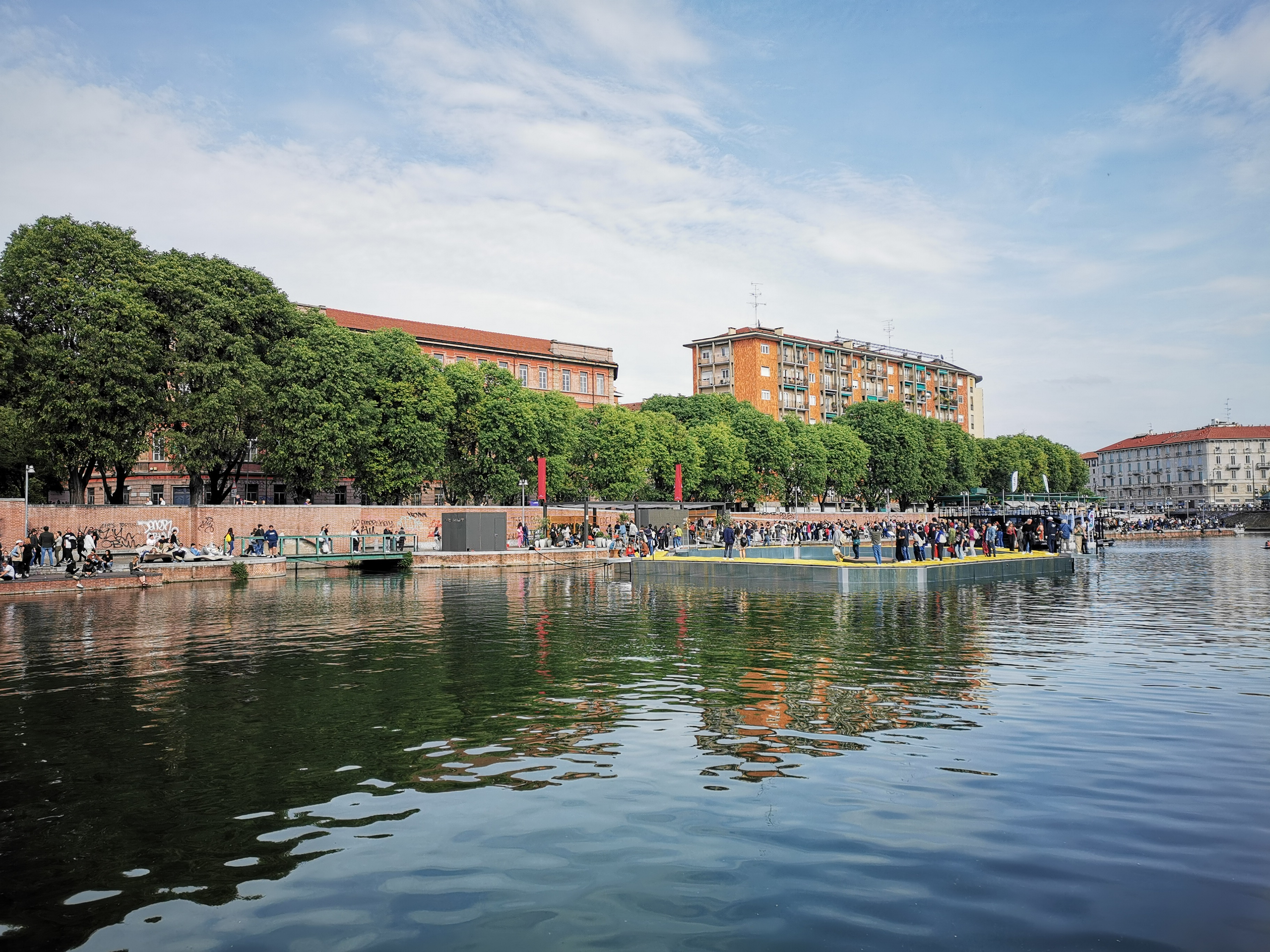
Darsena

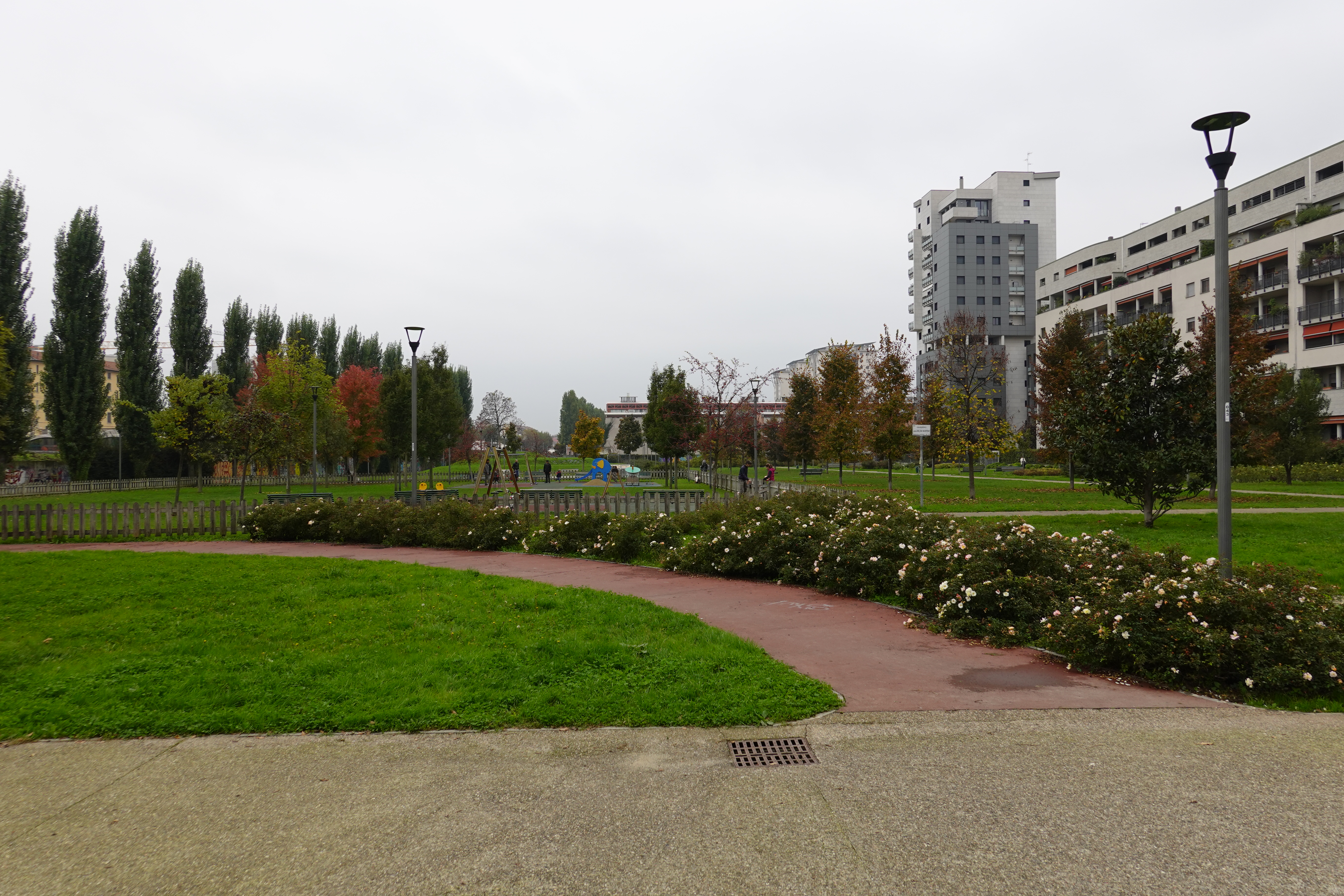
Anna Del Bo Boffino garden

== Maps ==
Map of Milan Zone 6
