= San Cristoforo sul Naviglio (district of Milan) =

District of Milan, Italy

Coordinates: 45°26′44″N 9°09′03″E

- Quartiere of Milan
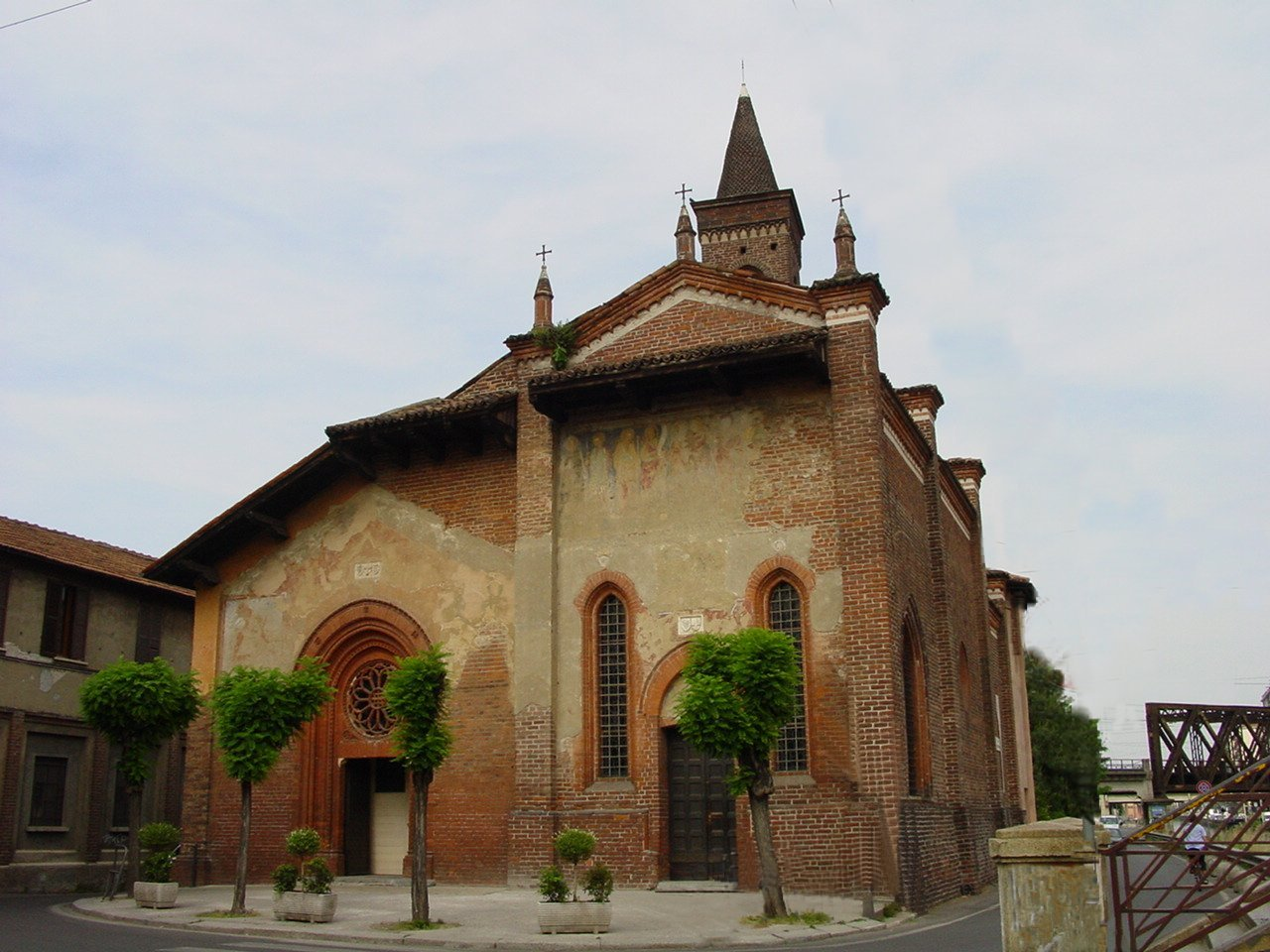
- The church of San Cristoforo sul Naviglio
- Interactive map of San Cristoforo sul Naviglio
- Country: Italy
- Region: Lombardy
- Province: Milan
- Comune: Milan
- Zone: 6
- Time zone: UTC+1 (CET)
  - Summer (DST): UTC+2 (CEST)

San Cristoforo sul Naviglio, or San Cristoforo for short, is a district ("quartiere") of Milan, Italy, part of the Zone 6 administrative division of the city. It is named after its most important monument, the Romanesque-Gothic church of San Cristoforo sul Naviglio. The district is located along the Naviglio Grande canal, south of Giambellino-Lorenteggio, centered on the small square between the Church and the Canal. There is an antiques market on Sundays.
