= Ronchetto sul Naviglio =

Coordinates: 45°26′22″N 9°07′39″E

- Quartiere of Milan
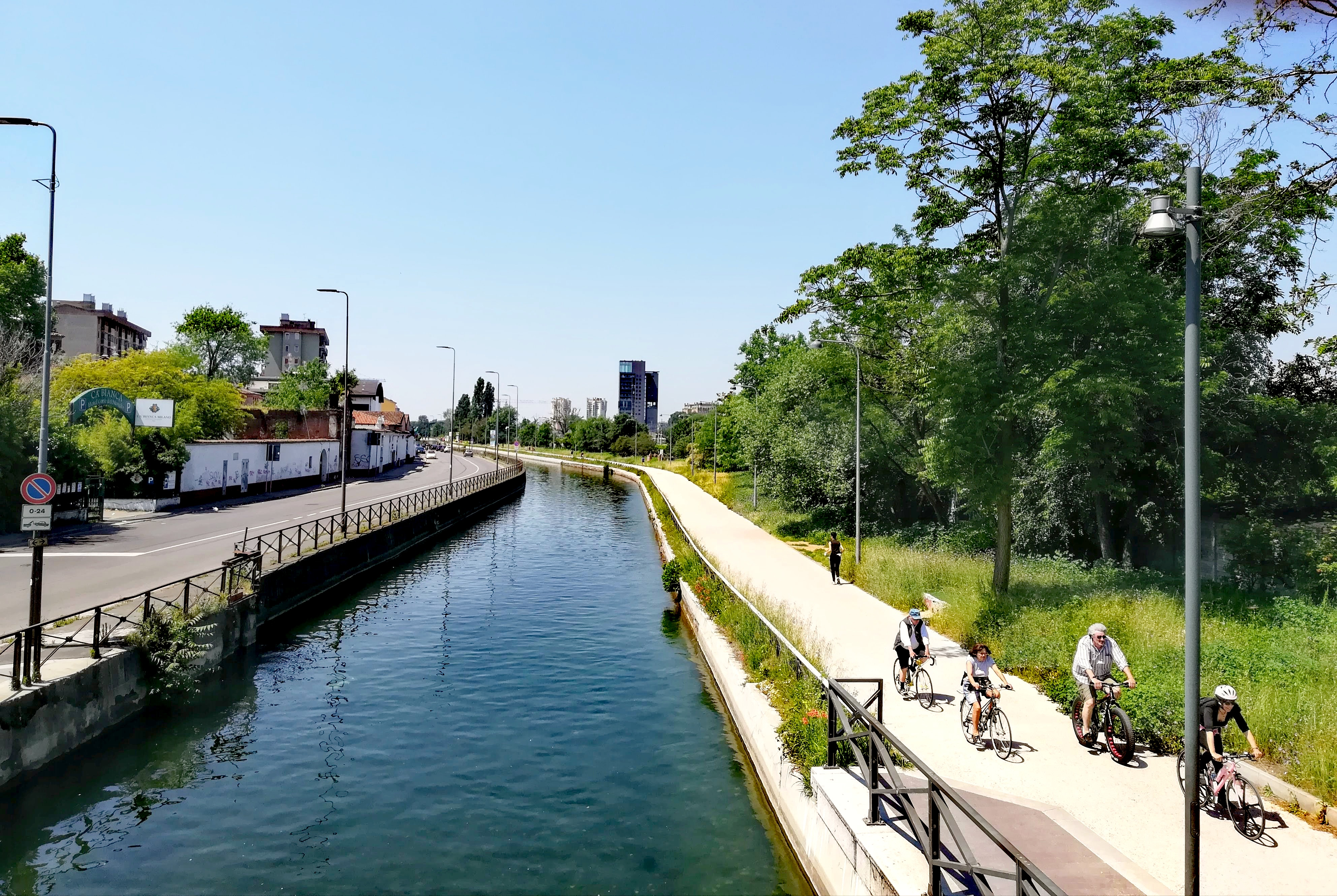
- View of the Naviglio Grande towards Corsico.
- Interactive map of Ronchetto sul Naviglio
- Country: Italy
- Region: Lombardy
- Province: Milan
- Comune: Milan
- Zone: 6
- Time zone: UTC+1 (CET)
  - Summer (DST): UTC+2 (CEST)

Ronchetto sul Naviglio is a district ("quartiere") of Milan, Italy, part of the Zone 6 administrative division of the city. Before being annexed to Milan (in 1923), it has been an autonomous comune until 1870, and a frazione of Buccinasco between 1870 and 1923.

Ronchetto is probably named after an ancient cascina (farmhouse) by that name; in turn, the name of the cascina is derived from the Lombard word ronch, which refers to different types of cultivated areas.

The original structure of the once rural settlement of Ronchetto is almost completely unrecognizable in the modern district, which has experienced a massive urbanization process in the 20th century and is now seamlessly connected to the urban agglomeration of Milan. A landmark of Ronchetto is a modern, 700-metre-long (2,300 ft) bridge that crosses both the Naviglio Grande canal and the Milan-Mortara railway, connecting Ronchetto to the Giambellino-Lorenteggio district.

The district has been experiencing a long period of decay and is often described as a degraded area. The Duomo Connection trial of the late 1980s revealed the extensive activity of the Mafia in the district.

Ronchetto sul Naviglio is also remembered as the scene of a battle between Italian partisans and the German army, occurred on 25 April 1945, i.e., the very day when Italy proclaimed its liberation from the German rule.
