= Scuola professionale Arnaldo Mussolini (Fondazione Emilio de Magistris) =

Coordinates: 45.45620°N 9.17244°E

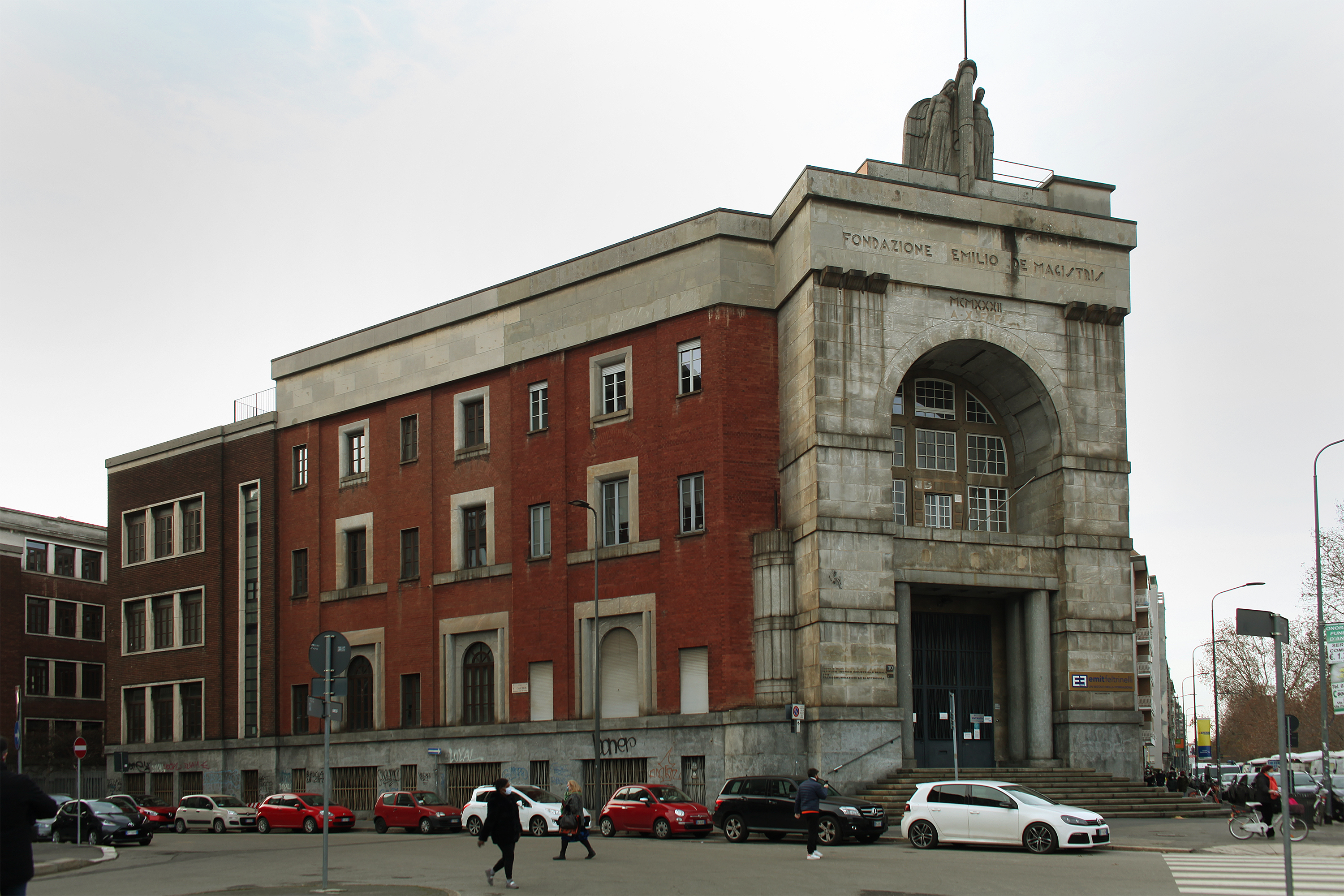
View of Facade and southern side.

The building at Piazzale Cantore #10 (near the former Porta Genova) first housed the Scuola Professionale Arnaldo Mussolini; it had been erected by the Fondazione Emilio di Magistris (this title is engraved at the top of the facade) but is presently the offices of the Ente Morale Giacomo Feltrinelli per l'incremento dell'Istruzione Tecnica (EMIT). The building is an example of fascist architecture and decoration.

== Construction ==
Emilio de Magistris was a wealthy industrialist who had been an early supporter of Benito Mussolini, from the movement of Sansepolcrismo into Italian fascism. He had been a participant in the March of Rome. He commissioned the construction of this school in 1932, and it was named after the recently deceased brother of Mussolini, Arnaldo. The architect was Giovanni Magnaghi and the engineer Stefano Balzarro.

== Architecture ==
The severe architecture of the facade has a portal vaguely resembling a triumphal arch with widening stairs in the front. Flanking the entrance are two smooth cylindrical pilasters. Atop the roof is a flagpole with two women before background resembling angel wings. The base of the flagpole is shaped like a fasces. Similar fasces are present at the sides of the facade. The date above the door states inauguration in year 10 of Fascist Era.
