= Porta Genova =

Coordinates: 45°27′20″N 9°10′23″E

- Quartiere of Milan
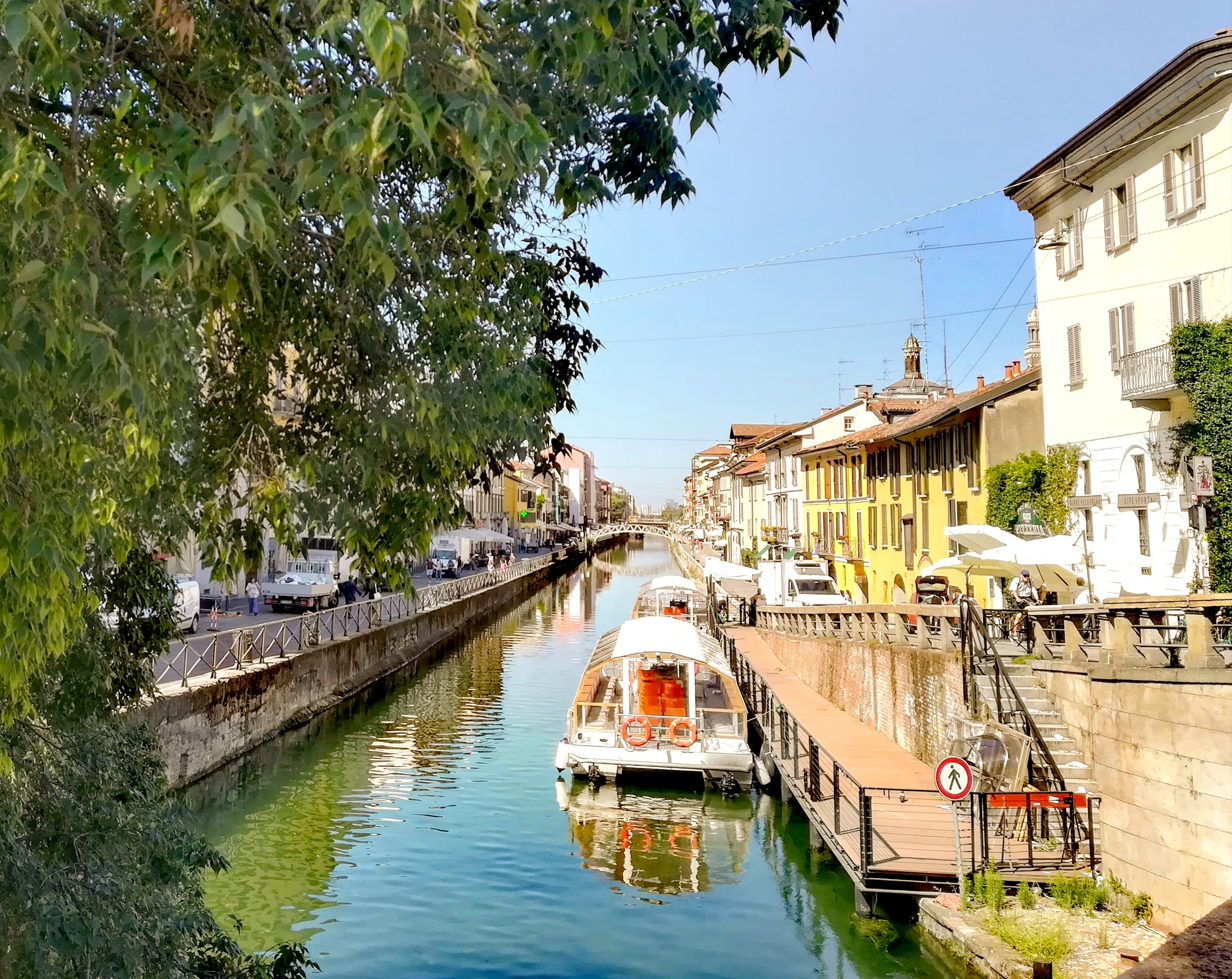
- The Naviglio Grande canal near the Darsena
- Interactive map of Porta Genova
- Country: Italy
- Region: Lombardy
- Province: Milan
- Comune: Milan
- Zone: 6
- Time zone: UTC+1 (CET)
  - Summer (DST): UTC+2 (CEST)

Porta Genova is a neighborhood ("quartiere") of Milan, Italy, located within the Zone 6 administrative division. The name "Porta Genova" means "Genoa gate"; the district is named after a city gate of the old Spanish Walls of Milan, namely that leading to Genoa, that used to be in what is now Piazza Cantore. The only remnants of the old gate are the small buildings that used to house the customs offices, which replaced the Spanish gate in the 19th century.

== Current description ==
As for all Milanese quartieri, the boundaries of Porta Genova are not formally defined; yet, they are usually thought of as comprising Via Solari, Via Bergognone, the Naviglio Grande canal and the Darsena. The district is centered in Piazza Cantore, where the city gate used to be, and the Porta Genova railway station, the oldest Milanese railway station to be still in operation.

The station is the terminus of the railway connecting Milan and Mortara. Since the station is in the centre of Porta Genova, the district is divided in two parts by the railway; an old iron bridge connecting the two sides known as "la scaletta" (the "ladder"), located next to the station, is one of the traditional landmarks of the district.

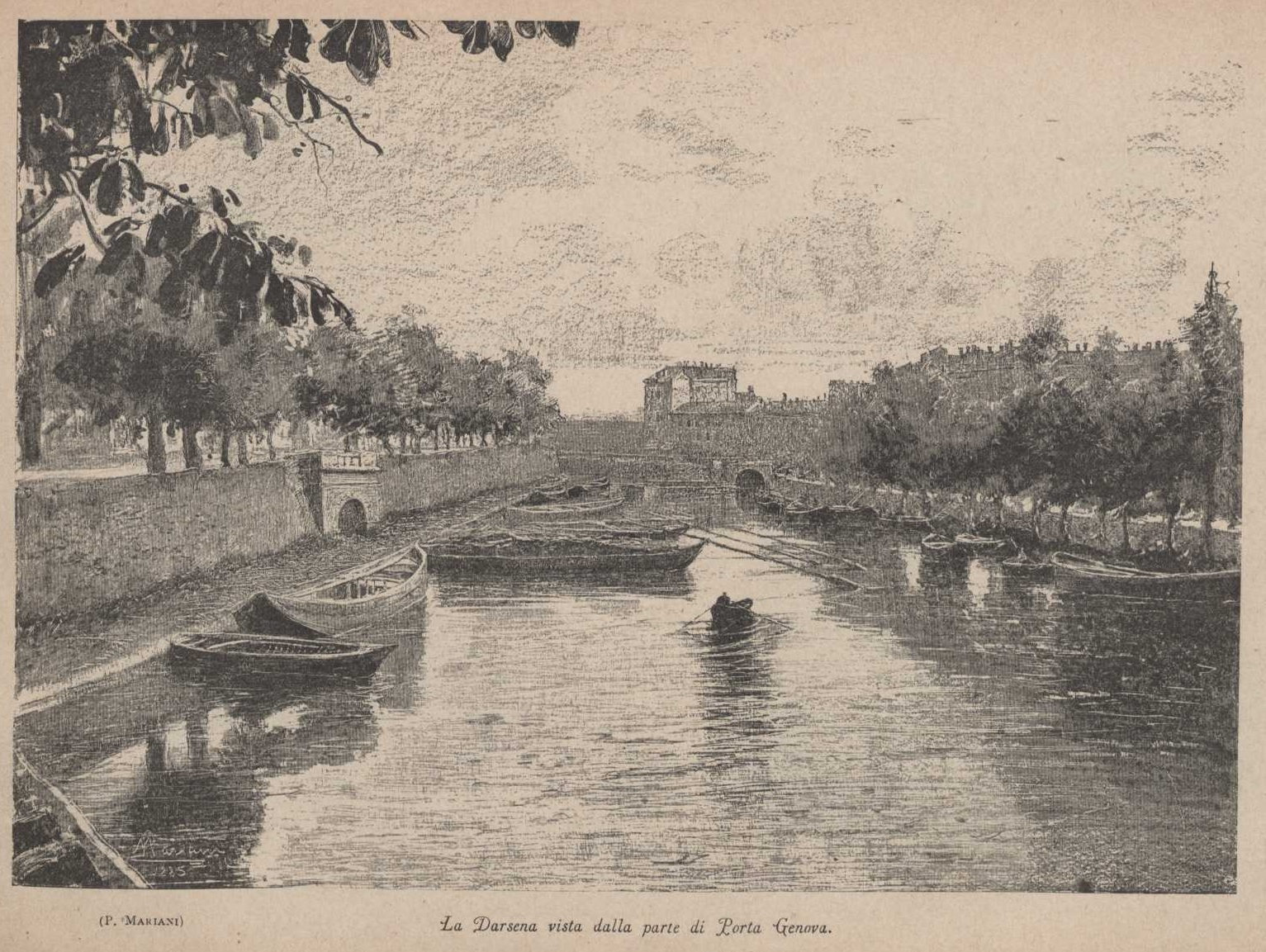
The darsena seen from Porta Genova, 1886 illustration

Porta Genova is also characterized by the Navigli canals and the Darsena (the old dock), where two major Navigli meet, namely the Naviglio Grande and the Naviglio Pavese. As a consequence, much of the district is traversed by watercourses. One of the best known landmarks of the canal banks in Porta Genova is Vicolo Lavandaie, a small alley where Milanese woman used to wash clothes in the Naviglio's waters.

The area was redeveloped from an industrial area to a residential, arts, and commercial area, starting with an initiative by photographer Fabrizio Ferri.

While Porta Genova is one of the most old-fashioned districts in Milan, and it is strongly connected to the tradition. It is also extremely popular with the Milanese youth, both for the night-life (especially along the banks of the Naviglio) and its anti-conformist atmosphere.

There are numerous "alternative" shops, as well as the character of the main street market of the area, the Fiera di Senigallia, which is considered one of the best places in Milan to look for "vintage, streetware (sic.) and quirky boutiques." The monthly market is also popular for locals and tourists.

== See also ==
- Porta Genova (Milan Metro)
