= Zone 6 =

Zone 6 may refer to:

- London fare zone 6, of the Transport for London zonal system
- Hardiness zone, a geographically defined zone in which a specific category of plant life is capable of growing
- Zone 6 of Milan, one of the 9 administrative zones of Milan, Italy
- Zone 6, Psychadelic Rock band with Sula Bassana
