= Assago =

Town in Lombardy, Italy

Assago Assagh / Sagh (Lombard)
- Comune
- Comune di Assago
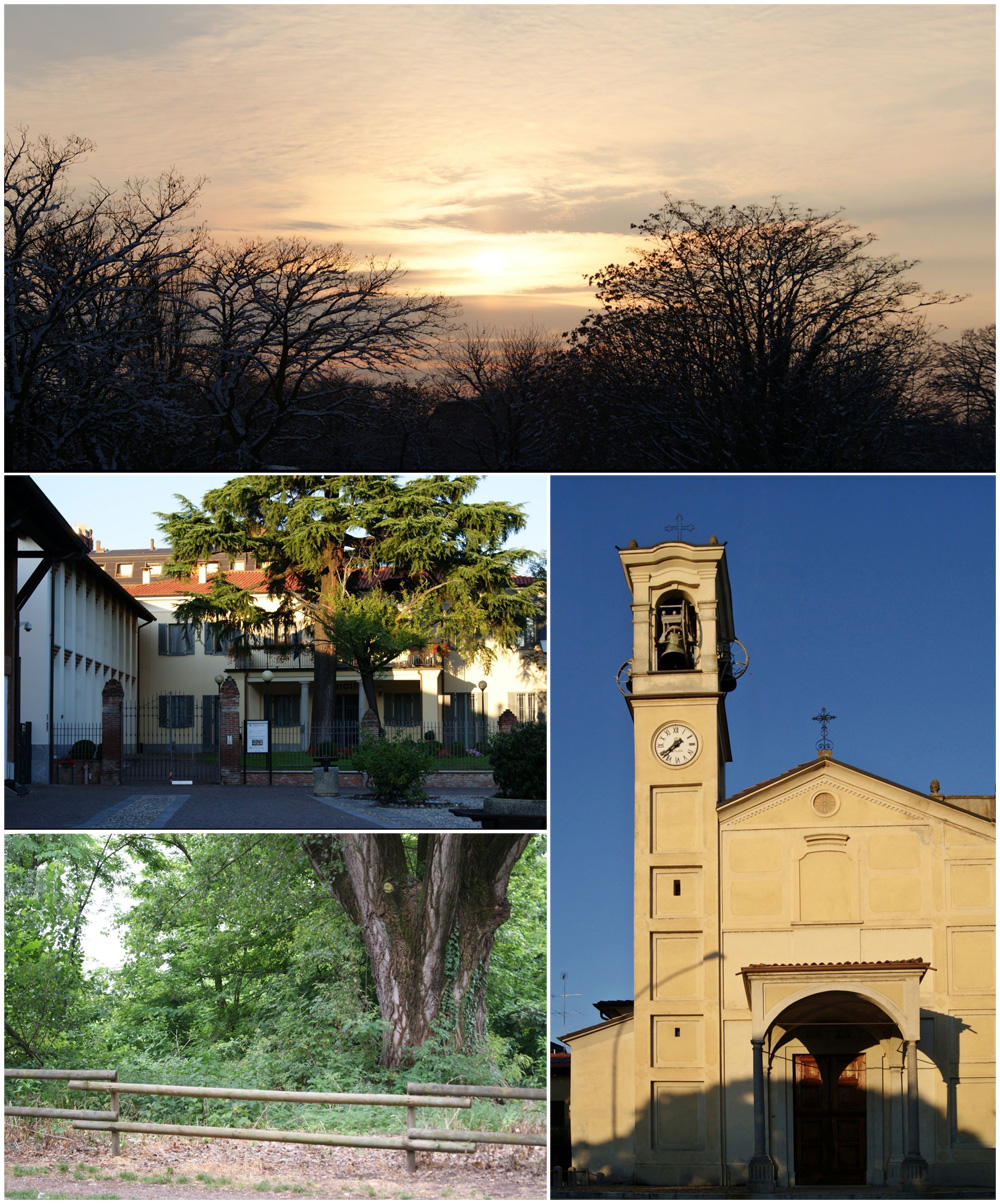

- Coat of arms

- Location of Assago in Italy Assago (Lombardy)
- Coordinates: 45°24′N 09°08′E
- Country: Italy
- Region: Lombardy
- Metropolitan city: Milan (MI)
- Frazioni: Cascina Bazzana, Cascina Bazzanella, Cascina Ventina, Milanofiori

Government
  - Mayor: Graziano Musella (since 9 June 2024)

Area
  - Total: 8.05 km^{2} (3.11 sq mi)
- Elevation: 110 m (360 ft)

Population (31 December 2024)
  - Total: 9,326
  - Density: 1,160/km^{2} (3,000/sq mi)
- Demonym: Assaghesi
- Time zone: UTC+1 (CET)
  - Summer (DST): UTC+2 (CEST)
- Postal code: 20057
- Dialing code: 02
- Patron saint: San Desiderio
- Saint day: 23 May
- Website: Official website

Assago ([asˈsaːɡo]; Milanese: Assagh [aˈsɑːk], Sagh [sɑːk]) is a town and municipality (Italian: comune) with 9,326 inhabitants in the Metropolitan City of Milan, in the northern Italian region of Lombardy.

It is home of the headquarters of Nestlé's Italian branch and the Unipol Forum, one of Italy's major indoor sports arena, used also for concerts and events.

== Geography ==
=== Topography ===
Assago is located in the southwestern zone of the Metropolitan City of Milan, and borders directly the capital of the said city, along with Buccinasco, Rozzano and Zibido San Giacomo. The town is crossed by the Autostrada A7 and the Autostrada A50.

Bordered by the Naviglio Pavese, the town is located in the Parco Agricolo Sud Milano. Many other small canals for irrigation, fed by underground springs navigli, flow through the area.

The municipality's elevation is 102–111 m (335–364 ft), and it lies on a single geological entity that dates back to the Pleistocene, made up from fluvial sand, gravel and silt.

=== Climate ===
During the winter (January) the temperature drops to 3 °C (37 °F) with 65 mm (2.6 in) of rainfall. Fog and frost can be observed. During the summer (July) the average temperature is 25 °C (77 °F) with 65 mm (2.6 in) of rainfall. Storms, accompanied by strong winds and rain, are frequent. Hailstorms can occur.

== Etymology ==
There are two main hypotheses about the origin of the name:

- The name "Assago" could come from the Ecclesiastical Latin Assagum, a union of the name Assius (a Roman farmer who lived in the area where the Church of San Desiderio is now located), and ager (meaning "crop"). If so, Assago would mean "crop" or "Assius's crop". The translation thus indicates the origin of the town's toponoym to a single roman farmer who first settled and owned the fields in the area;
- An alternative hypothesis suggests the suffix -agh (which in Italian became ago), a Lombardian suffix typical of places near water courses. The root ass would, too, be typical of localities near water, but with different origins. The name Assago would thus come from the union of two different names, given by different populations who inhabited the municipality's fertile and rich of water springs territory in different periods of history.

== History ==
According to archeological studies made near the church of San Desiderio, the remains of a wall and various objects of Roman origin were found, indicating the existence of a roman villa built in the 1st century CE. These remains were used, during the High Middle Ages, for burial site. Assago is first referenced in a document dated to 1153: in the description of a trial, between the testimonies, a reference is made to someone called Azo de Axago.

In 1346, Assago was part of the pieve of Cesano Boscone.

=== Modern age ===
During the 18th century, all of the territory controlled by the Duchy of Milan, including Assago, was assessed and recorded. In 1722, Assago's territory was made up of four towns: Assago, Bazzana Sant'Ilario, Bazzanella con Monte Gaudio and Pontirolo.

- The land and agricultural buildings were the property of the marquises Corbella and Calderari. Bazzana Sant'Ilario was property of count Nicolò Maria Visconti and the marquises Gerolamo Ferreri and Giovanni Battista Resta.
- Bazzanella was the property of the church and some bourgeois.
- Pontirolo was the property of the marquis Corbella.

In 1771 Assago was inhabited by 730 people. Under the control of the First French Empire there were some short-term changes: in 1809 Bazzana and Bazzanella were united for the first time, while in 1811 all of these, Assago too, were put under the control of Corsico. In 1816, Austria reverted these changes.

=== Contemporary age ===
In 1841, Austria determined the second and definitive annexation of Bazzana and Bazzanella. In 1854, Assago was inhabited by 762 people. The territory belonged mainly to five owners: Count Luigi Confalonieri, nobles Luigi and Benedetta Peluso, the parish and Luigi Simonetta. In 1881, the territory was divided between the families Galloni, Monfrini, Olginati, the municipality of Assago and the parish.

On 20 January 1900, the municipality bought a 768 m^{2} (0.2-acre) plot of land from the Olginati family at a cost of 14,500 lire for a town hall and primary school, the construction of which cost 17,300 lire. On 16 October 1906 construction of an electrical line was started, and on 1 October 1908 those for the construction of a telephone line. On 17 January 1915, the city council approved an expenditure of 15,500 lire (subsequently increased) for the construction of a 400 m^{2} (0.1-acre) kindergarten that would accommodate 70 children.

During the First World War, 167 inhabitants left for the front; of these 28 did not return. The municipal administration decided to support the most needy families with special compensation, with a 20-year payment plan of 116 lire for war orphans.

On 13 August 1926 the mayor, Ernesto Moro, approved the construction of an electric cabin. In 1929 the prefecture of Milan started a project to merge the municipalities of Assago, Rozzano and Basiglio; the merger failed through lack of time.

In 1940, Assago had 100 inhabitants. On the night between 18 and 19 November 1940, five Vickers Wellington military bombers of RAF Bomber Command, headed for the Pirelli factories, mistakenly hit the Cavallazza farm.

On 10 August 1944 two Assago partisans, Giuseppe de Vecchi and Mario Idiomi, lost their lives in a military clash at Noviglio.

In 1946 the consequences of the war and the anti-fascist struggle were reported: 84 survivors returned, 25 still abroad, 13 missing and 2 partisans killed.

In 2008 the anti-mafia district of Milan documented, as part of the Cerberus Investigation, the monopoly of the calabrian 'ndrine Barbaro-Papalia in the area of Buccinasco, Assago and Corsico.

=== Symbols ===
The coat of arms and banner of the Comune di Assago were granted by decree of the Italian President on 26 June 1973.

"Of blue, to the gear of gold, to three ears of grain to the natural, interlaced in the gear, tied of silver. External ornaments for Comune."

The gear recalls the presence of factories and industries in the area, while the ears of wheat symbolize the abundant cereal fields in the municipality.

The banner is a yellow drape.

=== Honours ===
Since 2012, Assago has granted honorary citizenship to notable people: Tenzin Gyatso, 14th Dalai Lama; Rafael Correa, president of Ecuador; Giusy Versace, paralympic athlete.

== Sport ==
Football Teams: GS ASSAGO and O.S.M.

== Twin towns ==
Assago is twinned with:

- Nozay, Essonne, France, since 2006
- Střelice, Czech Republic, since 2006
