= Gemini Center =

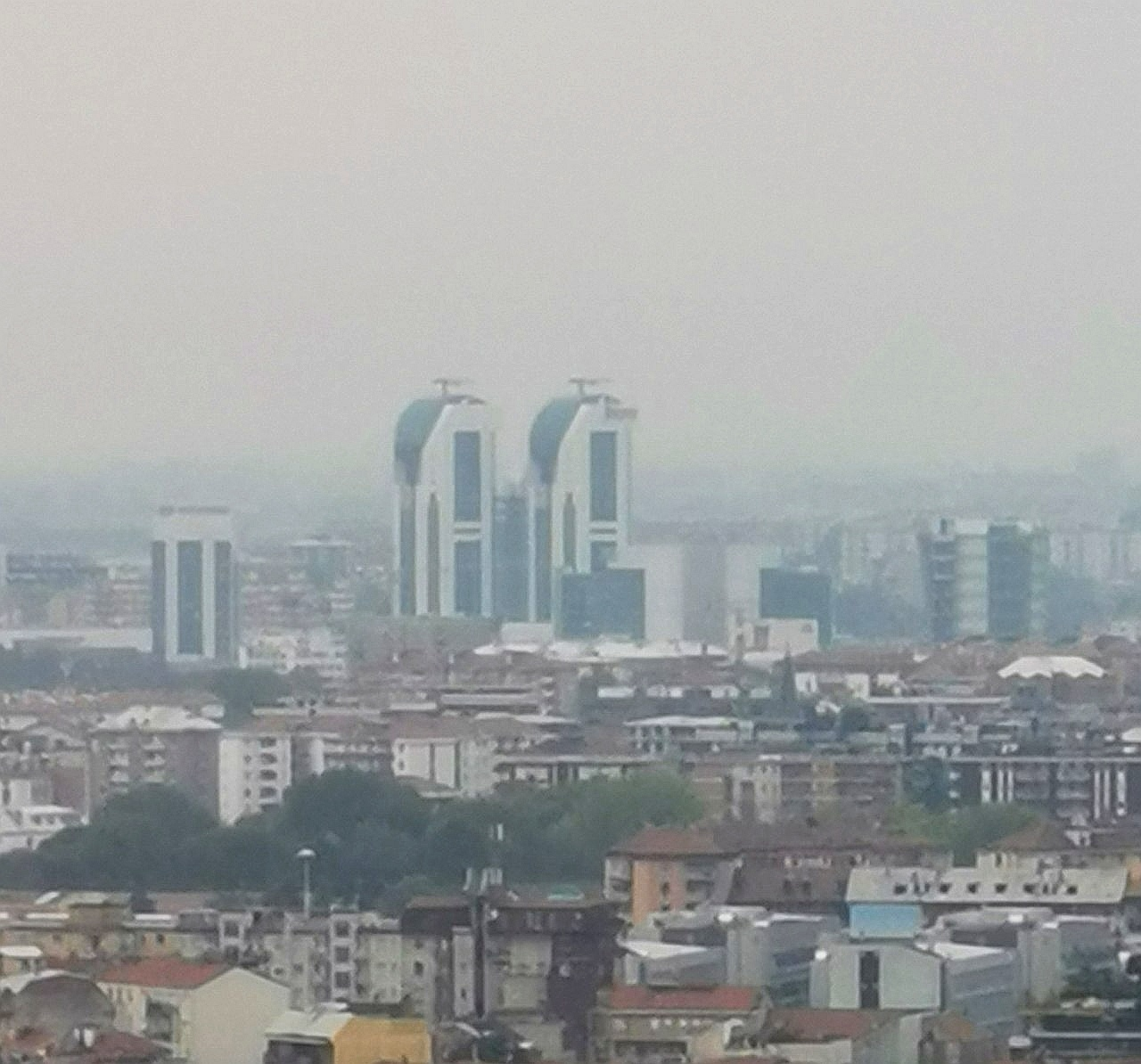
- The twin towers of Gemini Center in Milan
- Interactive map of the Gemini Center area

General information
- Status: Completed
- Type: Office
- Location: Milan, Italy
- Coordinates: 45°26′41.69″N 9°6′48.61″E
- Construction started: 1989
- Completed: 1996

Height
- Roof: 96 m (315 ft)

Design and construction
- Architects: R. Gantes, R. Morisi

The Gemini Center is an office complex comprising two skyscrapers located in Milan, Italy, at the most peripheral end of Via Lorenteggio, in the Giambellino-Lorenteggio district, adjacent to Milan's border with Corsico. The two towers are 96 m, 21 stories high; they were designed by architects R. Gantes and R. Morisi.

A distinctive trait of the Gemini Center towers are two cranes located on the buildings' top, which are used for cleaning the glass panes that cover most of the towers' external surface. The towers are connected to each other by glass bridges (up to the 15th floor).

The first tower was completed in 1992, and the second was completed in 1996.
