= Giambellino-Lorenteggio =

Coordinates: 45°26′40″N 9°07′15″E

Giambellino
- Quartiere of Milan
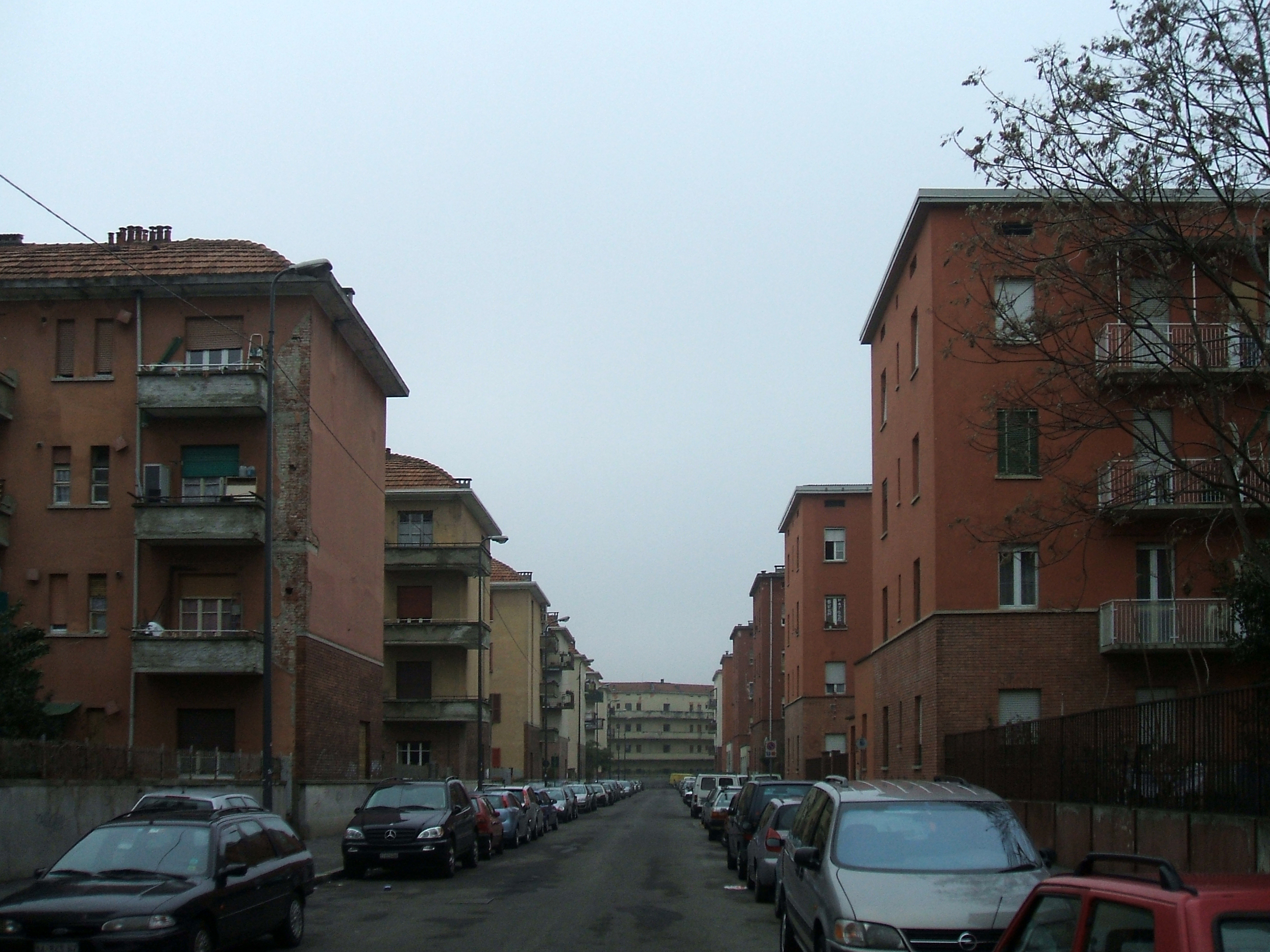
- Apartment buildings in Giambellino
- Interactive map of Giambellino
- Country: Italy
- Region: Lombardy
- Province: Milan
- Comune: Milan
- Zone: 6
- Time zone: UTC+1 (CET)
  - Summer (DST): UTC+2 (CEST)

Giambellino (Lombard: Quarter Giambellin) and Lorenteggio (Lombard: Lorentegg, [luˌrẽːˈted͡ʒ]) are two historical and populous residential neighborhoods of Milan, Italy. Together, they form a district ("quartiere"), part of the Zone 6 administrative division of Milan.

The district is centered along two parallel streets (over 2 km long), Via Giambellino and Via Lorenteggio, that extend from the south-west of Milan outwards to the border of the comune of Corsico. These two main streets house a number of shops and stores, and together form a peripheral shopping district. The area is nevertheless mainly residential, with both high-income housing (especially in the area of Via Soderini, Via Arzaga, Viale San Gimignano, and the innermost part of Via Lorenteggio) and low-income housing (especially in Via Giambellino and the peripheral part of the district).

== History ==
The original, rural settlement from which the district evolved was a rural comune named "Lorenteggio e Uniti". The toponymy "Lorenteggio", in turn, comes from the diminutive "Laurentiglio" of proper noun "Laurente". In 1800, Lorenteggio had 143 inhabitants. In 1841, part of Lorenteggio was annexed to Corsico, while the rest became part of the Corpi Santi comune. The boundary between these two parts was a toll-gate. The toll-gate building has been completely renewed, but it still marks the boundary between Milan and Corsico and it is still referred to as "Il Dazio" ("the Toll-gate"); nowadays, it has been adapted as a restaurant (it was a McDonald's restaurant for several years).

Lorenteggio kept its rural character until the late 19th century, its territory being partitioned into several cascine (farmhouses), some of which existed well into the 20th century. In the 20th century, Lorenteggio was annexed to Milan, and a quick urbanization and industrialization process started. The industrial development of the area was boosted by the construction of the railway connecting Milan to the south-west of Lombardy, in the early 1900s; the San Cristoforo railway station, completed in 1909, is still in operation. One of the most famous factories that were established in Lorenteggio is that of the Osram lighting manufacturer.

Massive construction of apartment blocks in Lorenteggio began in the mid 20th century. The district today is completely urban, with the last remainders of the rural landscape being only found past the boundary of Corsico.

== Transportation ==
The Giambellino-Lorenteggio district is well-connected to the centre of Milan, with several Milan Metro stops within its area, as well as a number of tram (on Via Giambellino) and bus lines. Via Lorenteggio is the main thoroughfare connecting the south-west of Milan to the centre; it is the continuation of the Strada Vigevanese, a prominent Lombard road that connects Milan to Vigevano. The district also includes part of the Circonvallazione ring road, which is served by two trolleybus lines, respectively going clockwise and counterclockwise. The outermost part of the district houses several capilinea of interurban buses going to nearby comuni such as Assago, Trezzano sul Naviglio, Corsico, and Buccinasco. Next to the border to Corsico is also the San Cristoforo railway station, which connects the district inwards to Porta Genova in Milan and outwards to Abbiategrasso and Mortara in Lomellina. There is a plan for a new Milan Metro station to be realized at San Cristoforo station; this will also provide a direct connection from the district to the Linate Airport.

== Church of Saint Protasius ==
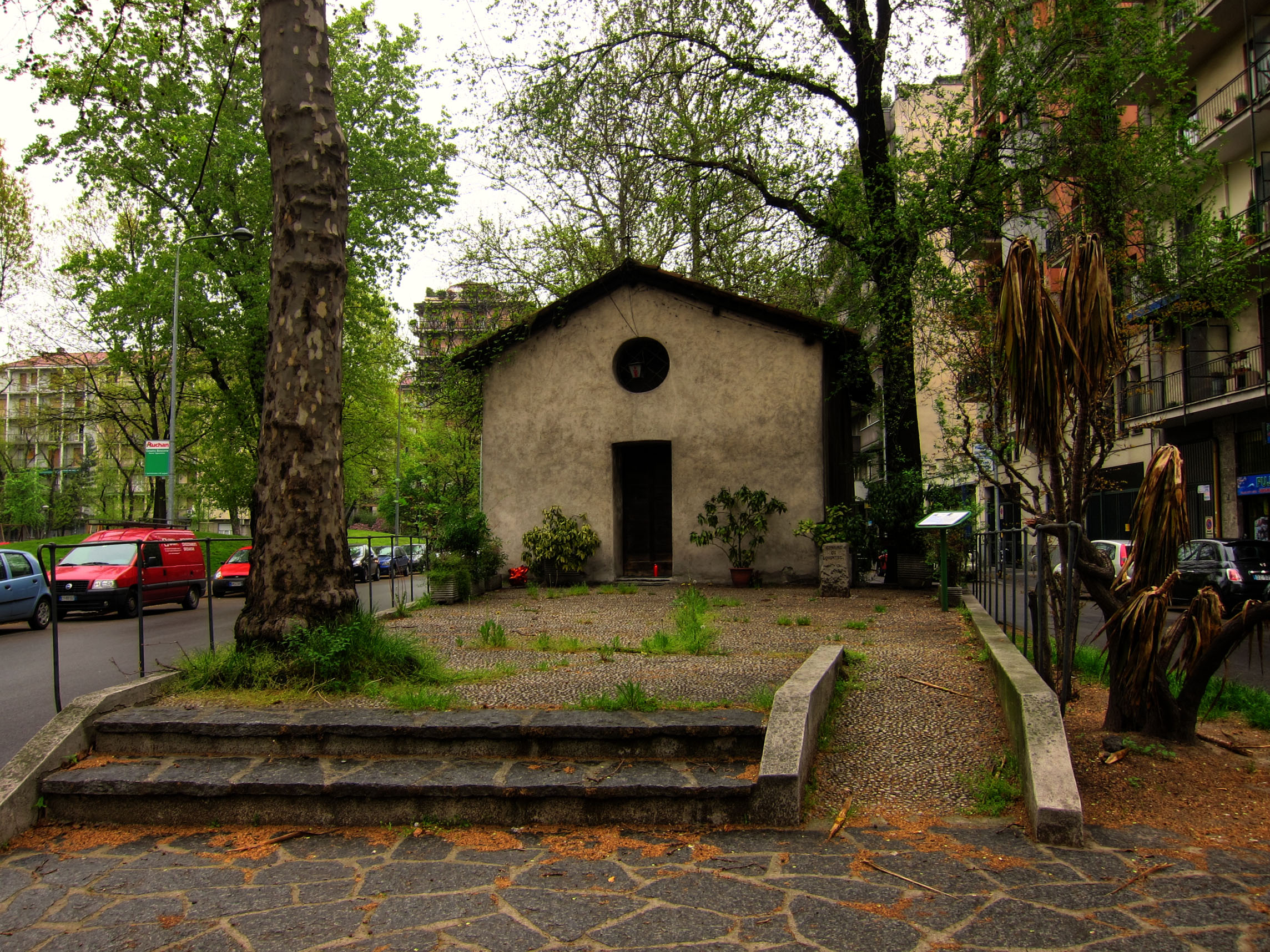
Church of Saint Protasius

Via Lorenteggio and Via Giambellino have very few historical buildings, as most buildings were realized in the 1960s or later; yet, the district has a very unusual landmark in the medieval church of Saint Protasius. This is a very small and simple church, which was scheduled for demolition when the modern street of Via Lorenteggio was built. The local population strongly opposed this decision; in fact, as the church is so small, it could be preserved by enclosing it in the traffic island separating the two lanes of Lorenteggio. Although of little architectonic value, the church is very ancient (dating back at least to the 11th century), has some interesting (although badly preserved) frescos, and is strongly connected to the Milanese tradition. According to a well known legend, for example, Frederick I Barbarossa prayed in this church before the siege of Milan.

== Notable people and references in popular culture ==
Giambellino-Lorenteggio is a very populous district, where a large number of immigrants settled during the economic boom of Milan in the 1960s. At the same time, it was not as isolated or far from the historic centre of Milan, and from the Milanese tradition and culture, as was the case with so called "dormitory" districts (e.g., Gratosoglio or Ponte Lambro). This resulted in the district being, in the 1960s and 1970s, a sort of cultural melting pot, which yielded a generation of talented "new" Milanese (usually coming from proletarian families of southern origin) who became famous in different fields.

The most prominent name to be associated to the Giambellino is possibly that of singer-songwriter Giorgio Gaber, who brought the district to national fame with his extremely popular song La ballata del Cerutti ("The ballad of Cerutti"). The song describes daily life in the "Bar Gino" (a bar in Giambellino) in the 1960s. The bar actually existed, and Gaber was a regular there, along with Bobby Solo, Adriano Celentano, Ricky Gianco and Gino Bramieri, all of which would later gain national or international fame (the former three as singers, the latter as a comic actor). Actor and screenwriter Diego Abatantuono, who grew up in Lorenteggio, has declared to have taken inspiration from his memories of the people of Giambellino and Lorenteggio for some of his roles and to have a predilection for this district as a setting for his movies. Other notable people who lived in this district include actor Ugo Conti and journalist Enrico Mentana and, reportedly, Silvio Berlusconi (at least, he was registered in the electoral district of Via Soderini when he was young). One of the most popular Italian rock bands of the 1970s, I Camaleonti, rose from the ranks playing in cheap music clubs in Giambellino.

Popular Italian writer Andrea G. Pinketts has often declared to have spent much time in the small bars and clubs of Giambellino and Lorenteggio to find inspirations for his hardboiled novels.

== See also ==
- Gemini Center
