= San Giovanni Bono Church =

Church in Milan, Italy

Coordinates: 45.43088°N 9.16219°E

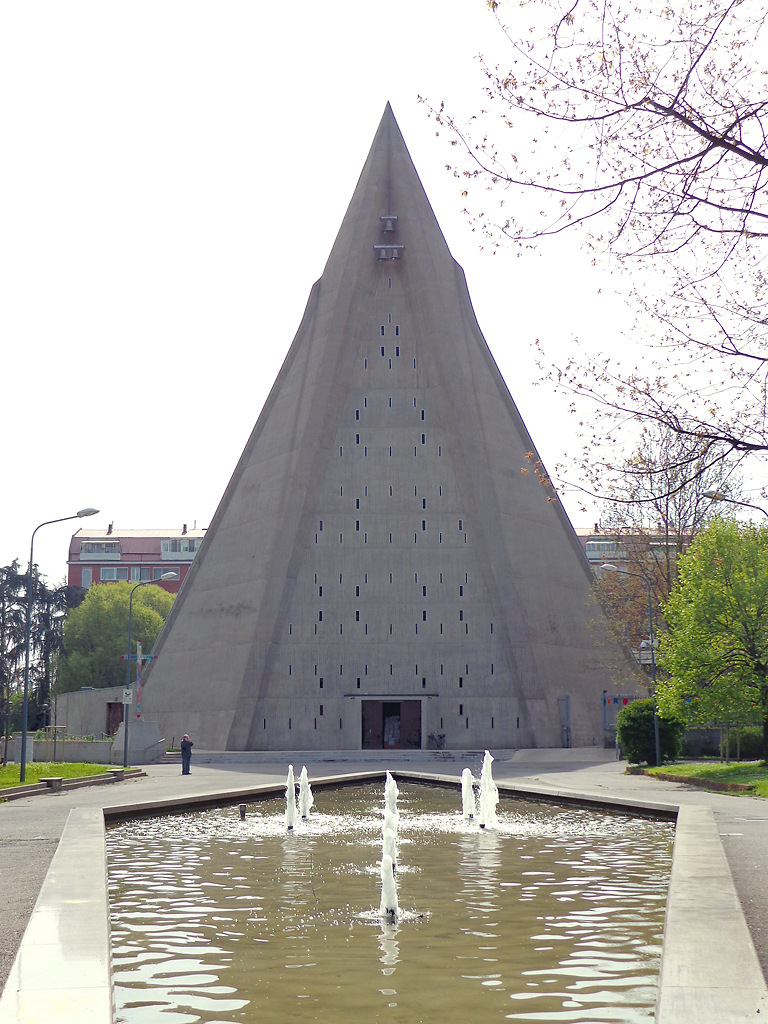
- Interactive map of the San Giovanni Bono Church area

General information
- Architectural style: Brutalism Modernist
- Location: Via San Paolino, 20 20142 Milano, Italy
- Construction started: 1862
- Completed: 1968

Design and construction
- Architect: Arrigo Arrighetti

San Giovanni Bono Church is a reinforced concrete Brutalist church in Quartiere Sant'Ambrogio Milan, Italy dedicated to John the Good. The building was designed by Arrigo Arrighetti and completed in 1968.
