= Navigli =

System of navigable canals in Milan

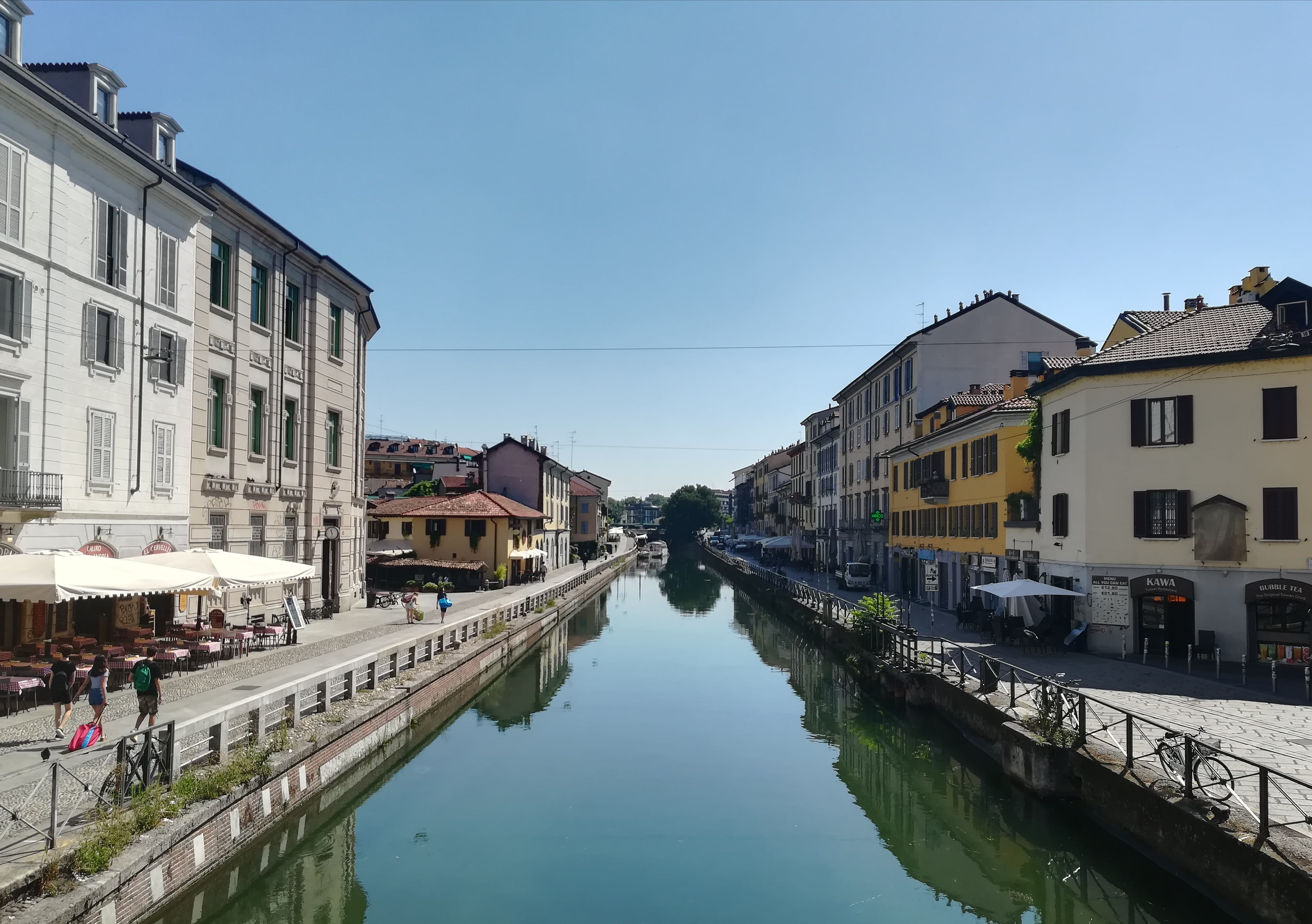
Naviglio Grande In Milan

The navigli (Italian pronunciation: [naˈviʎʎi]; Lombard: Navili [naˈʋiːli], singular and plural) are a system of interconnected canals in and around Milan, in the Italian region of Lombardy, dating back as far as the Middle Ages.

The system consists of five canals: Naviglio Grande, Naviglio Pavese, Naviglio Martesana, Naviglio di Paderno, Naviglio di Bereguardo. The first three were connected through Milan via the Fossa Interna, also known as the Inner Ring. The urban section of the Naviglio Martesana was covered over at the beginning of the 1930s, together with the entire Inner Ring, thus sounding the death knell for the north-eastern canals. Commercial carrying continued on the Naviglio Grande, but the decline was steady and by the 1960s a project of a fluvial port to reach the Po River and consequentially the Adriatic Sea through the canals was shelved for good.

== History ==
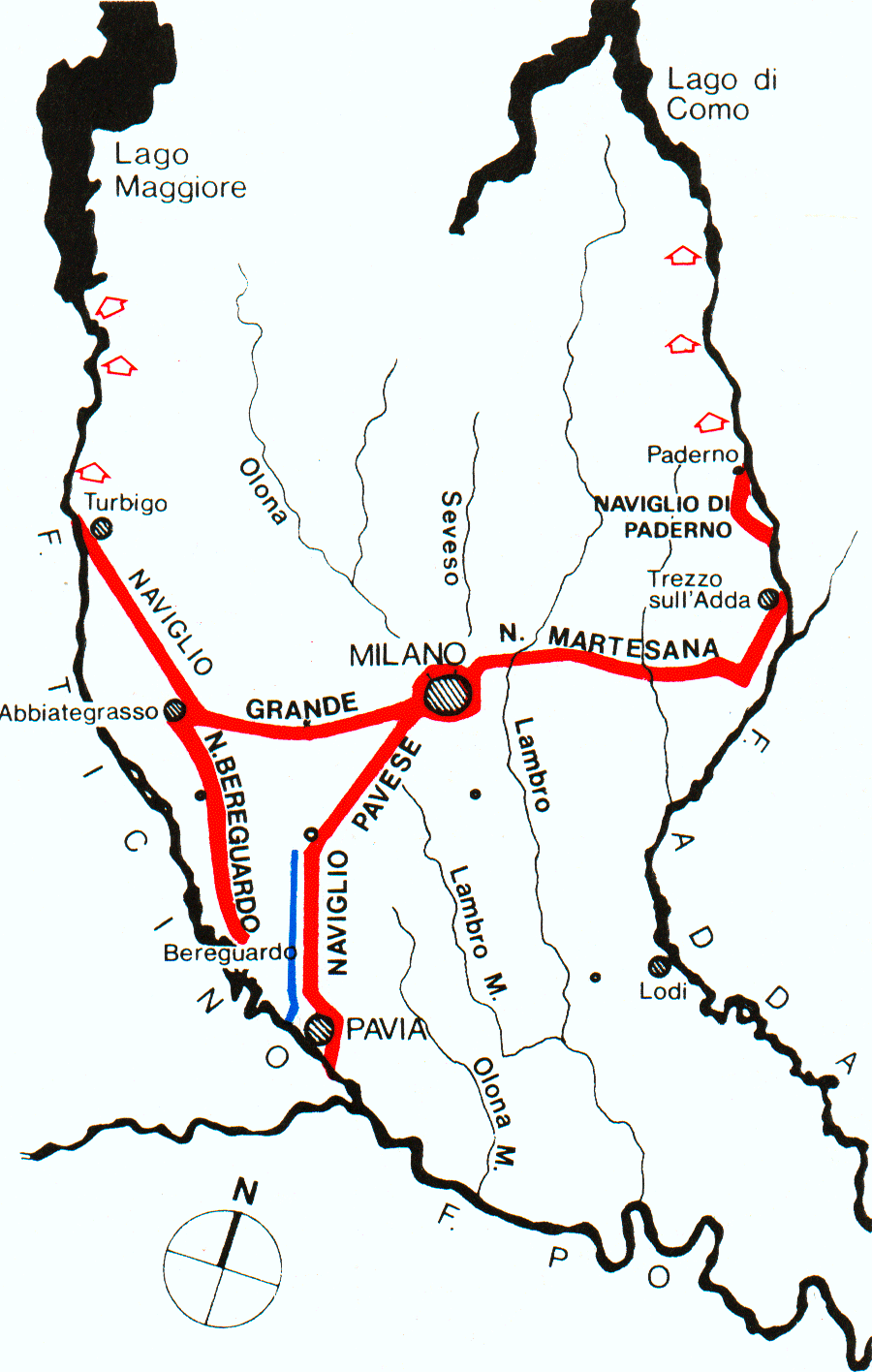
20th century map, with canals in red

The ancient Celtic settlement that gave rise to Milan was later replaced by a Roman one; the latter, which was called by the ancient Romans "Mediolanum", was then in turn replaced by a medieval settlement. But the urban center of Milan has steadily grown, until modern times, around the first Celtic nucleus.

The Celtic settlement had only one river namely the Nirone, and a fountain, the Molia (or Mollia). The Nirone lapped the ancient Mediolanum, while the Molia flowed near the settlement, collecting some irrigation from the north. Both of these were within the region of the Olona, which flowed further west, and the Seveso, whose natural bed was located further east.

The three major rivers (Lambro, Seveso and Olona) flow in their natural beds, the Lambro and the Olona furthest from the city, with the Seveso being closer. Of the three, the only one that has not changed over the centuries is the Lambro, which still flows in its ancient natural bed, while the Olona and Seveso were diverted by the ancient Romans.

The territory as a whole had plenty of water given that the settlement was located on the "line of fountains", between geological layers with different permeability, which allows deep waters to resurface on the surface. To perform agriculture the Celts had to regulate the flow of water by resorting to canalization and drainage.

In 222 BC the ancient Romans conquered Milan. Roman cities were large consumers of water, both for public and domestic uses, and Romans studied hydraulic engineering in depth. But Mediolanum did not need aqueducts, given that water was abundant and easily accessible because it emerged from the ground from the resurgences and flowed nearby in rivers and streams, and this fully met the needs of the city's daily life.

== Modern usage ==
Today, the canals are mostly used for irrigation. Some tourist navigation options are also available along certain sections.

== Modern life around the Navigli ==
In the 21st century the Navigli region of Milan is a highly active area with a large number of residential units, bars and restaurants. It is also a well known center for artists.

== Sources ==
- Bricchetti, Edo; Codara, Giuseppe (2017). Navigli del Milanese: ieri e oggi [Milanese Navigli: yesterday and today] (in Italian). Milano: Meravigli. ISBN 978-88-7955-397-1. OCLC 1110598606.
- Celona, Toti; Beltrame, Gianni (1988) [1982]. I Navigli Milanesi: storia e prospettive [The Milanese Navigli: history and perspectives] (in Italian). Milano: Silvana editoriale. ISBN 978-88-366-0001-4. OCLC 1294309117.
- Poggi, Felice; Masera, Giovanni; Milano Ufficio porto e navigazione (1921). Linea navigabile da Milano per Lodi e Pizzighettone alla foce dell'Adda: relazione tecnica sul progetto di canale navigabile Milano per Lodi-Pizzighettone a foce Adda e programma dei lavori elaborato dall'Ufficio Porto e navigazione del Comune di Milano [Navigable line from Milan to Lodi and Pizzighettone at the mouth of the Adda: technical report on the project for a navigable canal from Milan to Lodi-Pizzighettone at the mouth of the Adda and work programme drawn up by the Port and Navigation Office of the Municipality of Milan] (in Italian). Milano: Cooperativa grafica degli operai. OCLC 934099177.

== See also ==
- River valley civilization
