= Naviglio Pavese =

Canal of the Navigli system in Lombardy, Italy

Coordinates: 45°10′N 9°10′E

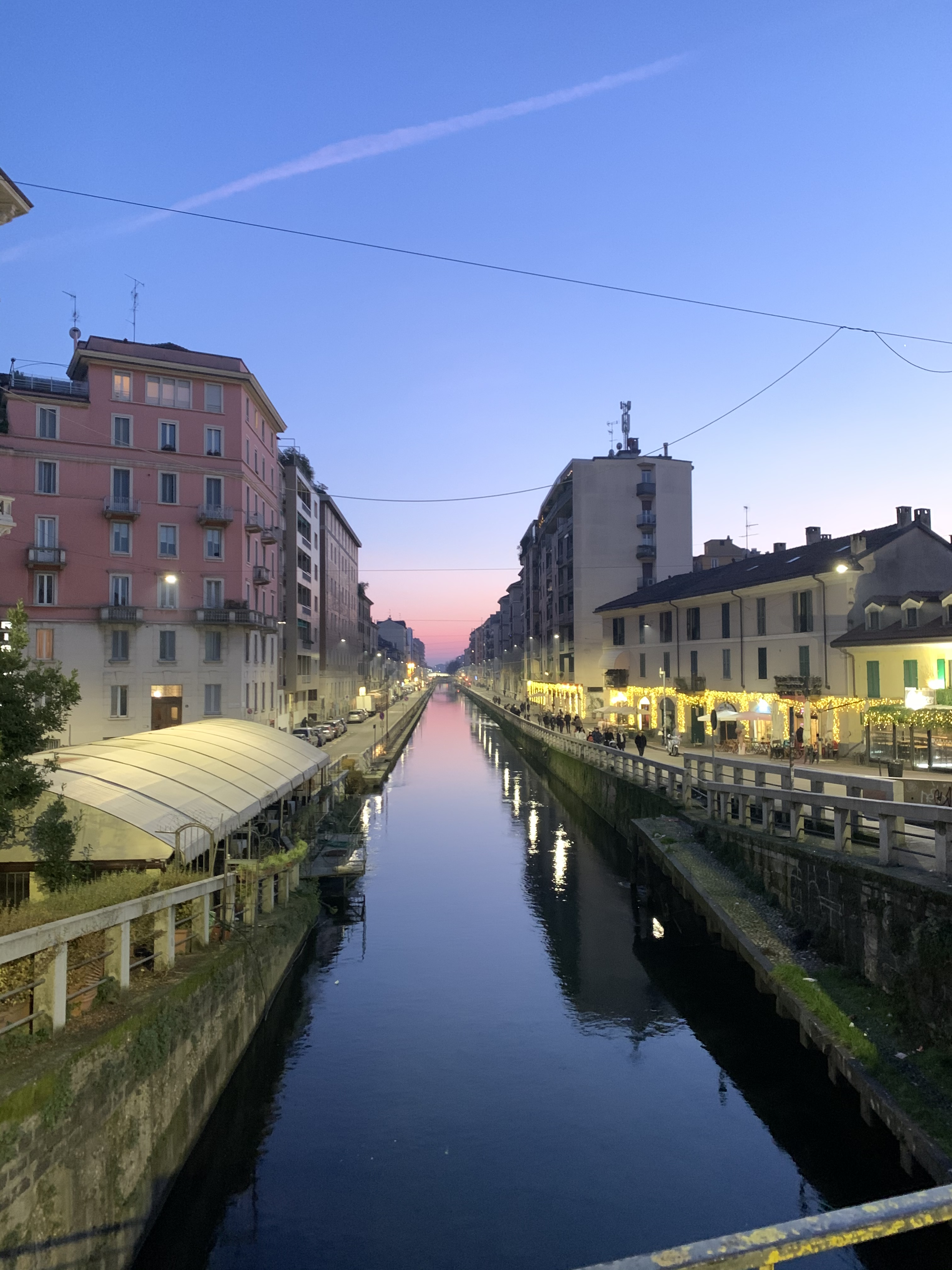
- The Naviglio Pavese in Milan
- Interactive map of Naviglio Pavese

Specifications
- Length: 33 km (21 mi)
- Locks: 6

History
- Construction began: 1564
- Date completed: 1819

Geography
- Start point: Milan
- End point: River Ticino at Pavia

The Naviglio Pavese is one of the canals making up the Navigli system in Lombardy, Italy. Once navigable, it is 33 km (21 mi) long and connected the city of Milan to Pavia, and through a flight of six locks to the River Ticino.

Construction started in 1564, but was interrupted 20 years later just outside Milan due to technical problems: the lock there is still called Conca Fallata, which in Italian means "Failed Lock". Building resumed at the beginning of the 19th century and was completed in 1819.

The canal was finally closed to navigation in the 1960s, but work has recently started to restore it back to full navigation, a link in the project to connect Switzerland to Venice by inland waterway.

== History ==
The need to connect Milan to the sea had been identified since ancient times. In 1470 the Naviglio di Bereguardo provided an awkward path which divided the canal from the River Ticino with exhausting transhipments on the back of a mule or even towing loaded boats from the river to the canal, but this allowed Pavia complete control over traffic to and from Milan. Ancient testimonies, e.g. by Bernardino Corio, a Milanese historian, indicate thatt Galeazzo II Visconti had a canal built in 1359 between Pavia and Milan for irrigation.

In 1457 Francesco Sforza ordered that a canal be built from Milan to Pavia via Bereguardi, following the indications of Bertola da Novate. Ten years later, the Magistrate of the ducal revenues assigned Andrea Calcoto to maintain and upkeep the "new canal", which was navigable. In 1600 the Count of Fuentes became the governor of Milan and assigned Alessandro Bisnati to extend the canal. The work was financed by a government bond as well as the community taxes.

== Sources ==
- Edo Bricchetti, Naviglio pavese e di Bereguardo, Meravigli 2016 ISBN 8879553798
- Francesco Ogliari, Angelo Cremonesi, Il Naviglio Pavese, Edizioni Selecta 2011 ISBN 8873324037
