= Naviglio Grande =

Canal in Lombardy, Italy

Coordinates: 45°27′N 9°10′E

- The canal near Turbigo
- Interactive map of Naviglio Grande

Specifications
- Length: 49.9 km (31.0 mi)

History
- Construction began: 1177
- Date completed: 1272

Geography
- Start point: Ticino river near Tornavento
- End point: Porta Ticinese dock in Milan

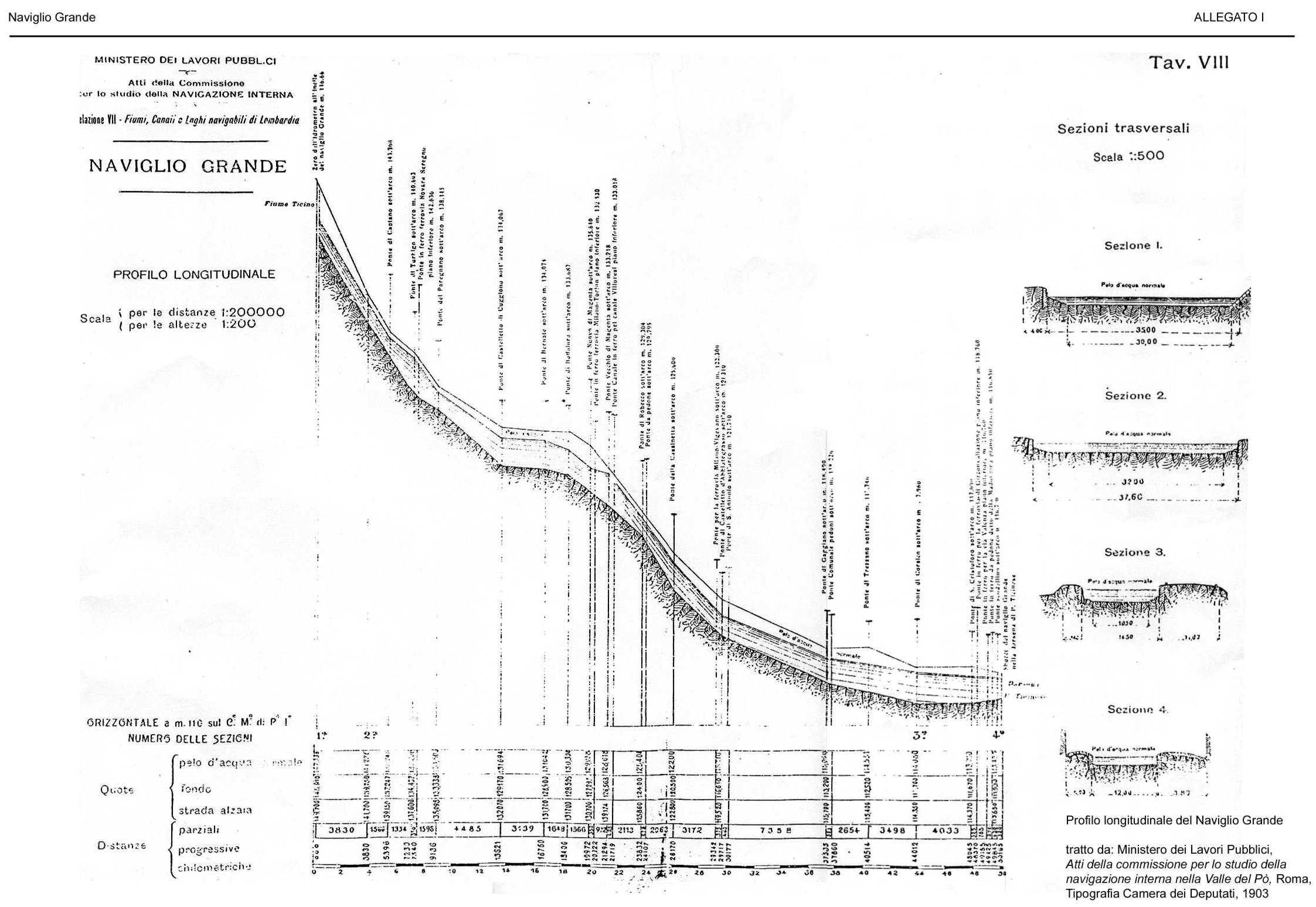
Longitudinal profile of the Naviglio Grande in 1903

The Naviglio Grande is a canal in Lombardy, northern Italy, connecting the Ticino river near Tornavento (23 km (14 mi) south of Sesto Calende) to the Porta Ticinese dock, also known as the Darsena, in Milan. It drops 34 m (112 ft) over 49.9 km (31.0 mi). It varies in width from 22 to 50 m (72 to 164 ft) from Tornavento to Abbiategrasso, dropping to 15 m (49 ft) between there and Milan. Initially it carries 63 cubic metres per second (2,200 cu ft/s), 116 outlets take water to irrigate 500 square kilometres (190 sq mi) leaving the canal 12 m (39 ft) wide and carrying 12 m^{3}/s (420 cu ft/s) as it enters the dock.

== History ==
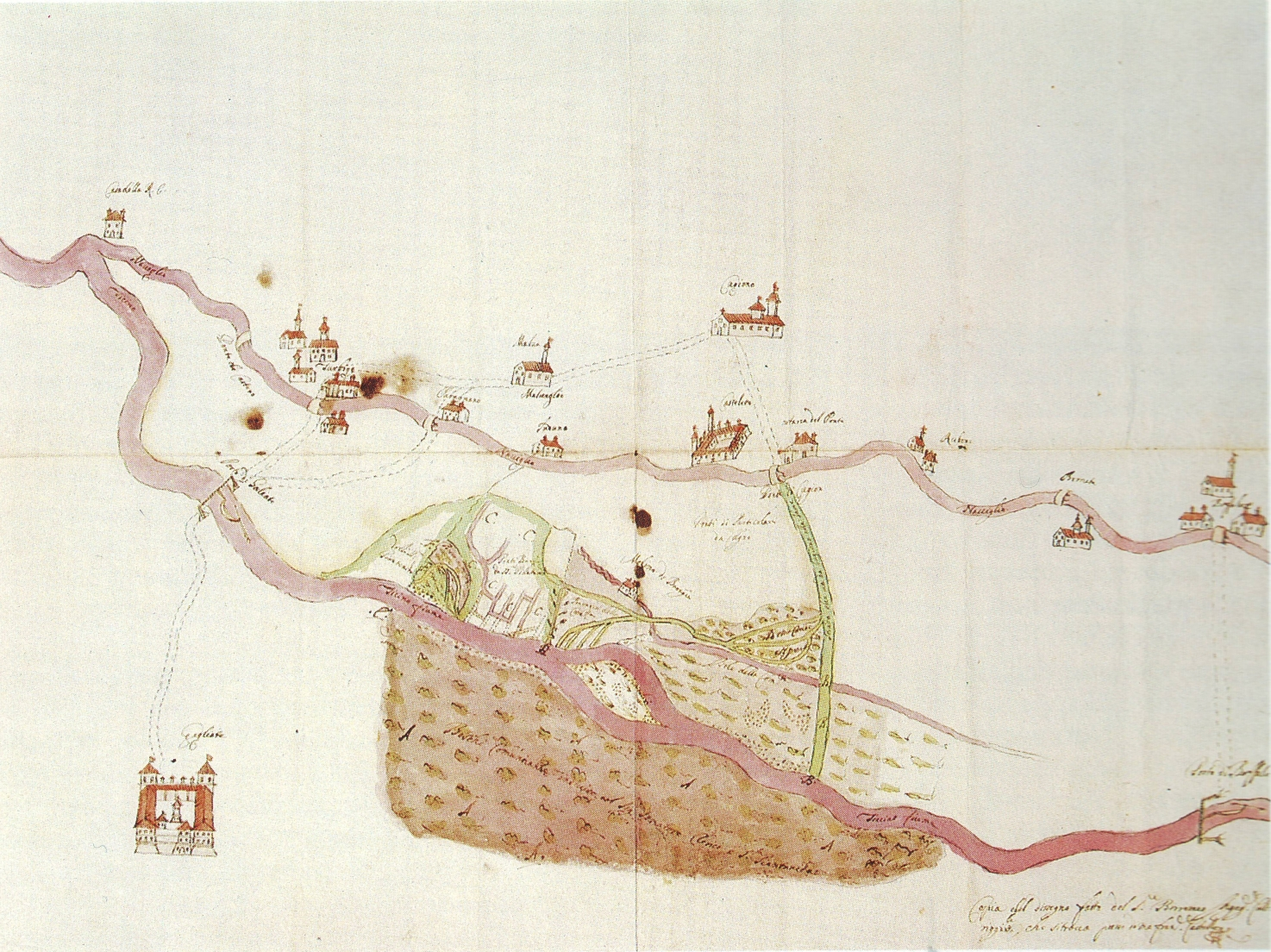
16th Century map. Milan state archive.

The Naviglio Grande was the most important of the Milanese “navigli”. Probably originating as a ditch dug in 1157 between Abbiategrasso and Landriano as a defense against Frederick Barbarossa, it was one of the largest medieval engineering projects, allowing development of commerce, transport and agriculture.

In 1177, construction began near Tornavento, but problems stopped work almost immediately. In 1179 however, a dam was constructed and water from the Ticino was directed towards Turbigo, Castelletto di Cuggiono, Bernate and Boffalora reaching Gaggiano in 1233. This 30 km (19 mi) section, the “Navigium de Gazano” took over 50 years to dig by hand using only pickaxe and shovel. Prisoners from Turbigo were put to work in 1239 to increase the carrying capacity of the canal.

In 1258, the Naviglio Grande reached Milan. New taxes were levied to continue the digging, and although the work stopped again following opposition from the citizens and clergy, the whole canal was navigable from 1272, when the deepening and widening of the canal bed was completed by Giacomo Arribotti and the canal reached the bridge of Sant'Eustorgio (now Porta Ticinese).

Although intended mostly for irrigation, pontoons called cobbie quickly began using the canal to take salt, grain, wine, manufactured goods, fabric, tableware, manure and ash upriver to Lake Maggiore and Switzerland, bringing back livestock, cheese, hay, coal, lumber, sand, marble and granite. The small lake of Sant'Eustorgio was linked to the Fossa Interna (also known as the Cerchia Interna or Inner Ring) of Milan using a new system of two locks to control the water level, thereby allowing boats to reach Piazza Santo Stefano. This was to allow the canal to be used in transporting stone and marble for the Duomo, whose construction started in 1386. This confirmed the canal to be the most valuable form of transport of Milan, and proved that the network could be expanded to serve the whole region, especially in transferring troops rapidly between defensive castles.

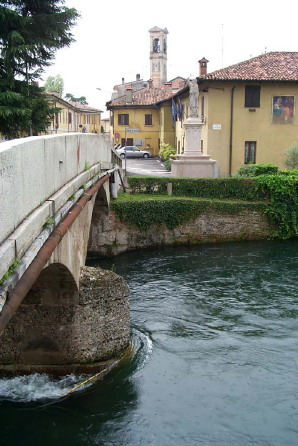
Bridge on the Naviglio Grande, in the town of Cassinetta di Lugagnano.

Between 1830 and the end of the century, traffic averaged 8,300 boats of all sizes coming and going, carrying 350,000 long tons (360,000 t) per year. It peaked again during the second world war – with Allied planes bombing road and rail, water transport again became useful for transporting goods. The surge in activity continued after the war - in 1953 Porta Ticinese dock was the 13th largest in the country in terms of goods received. However, an increase in the value of goods and strong interests supporting road transport caused a rapid decline. During the sixties, the Fossa Interna was covered over and on March 30, 1979, the last cargo of sand was unloaded at the Darsena. Since then the canal has been used only for its original purpose, irrigation.

Recently the Istituto per i Navigli has been campaigning for the return of navigation on the canal. The project, called From Switzerland to the Sea promotes the restoration of the canal as part of a long distance waterway linking Lake Maggiore (partly in Switzerland) to Venice (Italy).
