= Unique Italy =

Unique Italy Italia Unica
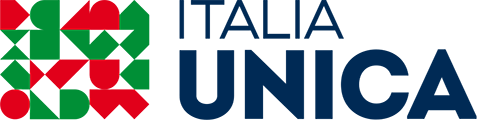
- President: Corrado Passera
- Coordinator: Lelio Alfonso
- Founded: 23 February 2014
- Dissolved: 6 September 2016
- Headquarters: Via di S. Teresa, 23, 00198 Rome
- Ideology: Liberalism
- Political position: Centre-right

Website
- www.italiaunica.it

Unique Italy (Italia Unica, IU; unico/a translates both to "unique" and "united") was a centre-right political party in Italy.

Its leader was Corrado Passera, a former manager (Mondadori, Espresso, Olivetti, Poste), banker (Intesa/Intesa Sanpaolo), supporter of the centre-left Olive Tree coalition and minister of Economic Development in Monti Cabinet (2011–2013).

== History ==
The party was launched during two conventions in February and June 2014, respectively. Passera aimed at forming a "liberal, popular and reform" alternative to Matteo Renzi's Democratic Party (PD) and re-unifying the centre-right, which was divided at the time between several contentious parties and leaders.

At its founding congress in January 2015, the party unveiled its leadership. Led by Passera, president, and Lelio Alfonso (former spokesperson of Future Italy, IF and Civic Choice, SC), national coordinator, the party's national board notably included Diego Bottacin (former regional councillor in Veneto for Democracy is Freedom–DL, the PD and Toward North–VN), Fabio Evangelisti (a former MP for the Democrats of the Left–DS and Italy of Values–IdV), Silvana Mura (former treasurer and MP of IdV), Renzo Tondo (a former Socialist who served as President of Friuli-Venezia Giulia and MP for Forza Italia–FI and The People of Freedom–PdL) and Santo Versace (another former Socialist who was MP for the PdL).

Pino Bicchielli (former member of the national board of Alliance for Italy–ApI and former coordinator of Democratic Centre–CD) and Marco Calgaro (a former MP of DL and the Union of the Centre–UdC) joined IU by September. Among the others who joined later, it is worth mentioning Maria Ida Germontani (a former member of Lega Nord–LN and senator of National Alliance–AN).

Since November 2015 IU was represented by Guglielmo Vaccaro, elected with the PD and formerly a close affiliate of Enrico Letta, in the Chamber of Deputies and by Gaetano Quagliariello, elected with the PdL, passed through the New Centre-Right (NCD) and now leader of Identity and Action (IdeA), which allowed membership to other parties through the so-called "double membership", in the Senate. Vaccaro also hinted that IU and IdeA would soon merge into a single party.

Passera was supposed to run for mayor in the 2016 municipal election in Milan, but eventually decided to endorse Stefano Parisi, the joint centre-right candidate supported by the LN, FI, the NCD and the UdC. Consequently, the IU candidates were included in the larger "Parisi List for a Unique Milano".

In September 2016 the party, which had failed to take roots in the country, was dissolved.

== Leadership ==
- President: Corrado Passera (2014–2016)
- Coordinator: Lelio Alfonso (2014–2016)
