= 2016 Milan municipal election =

Italian local election

- 5 June 2016 (first round); 19 June 2016 (second round)
- Turnout: 54.6% ▼13.0 pp (first round); 51.8% ▼2.8 pp (second round)
- Mayoral election
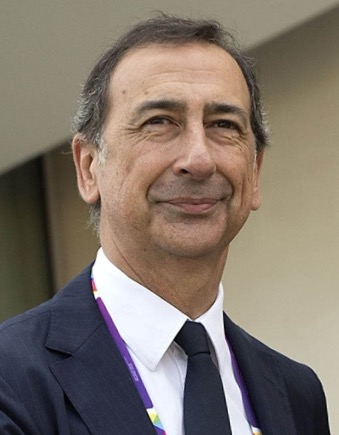

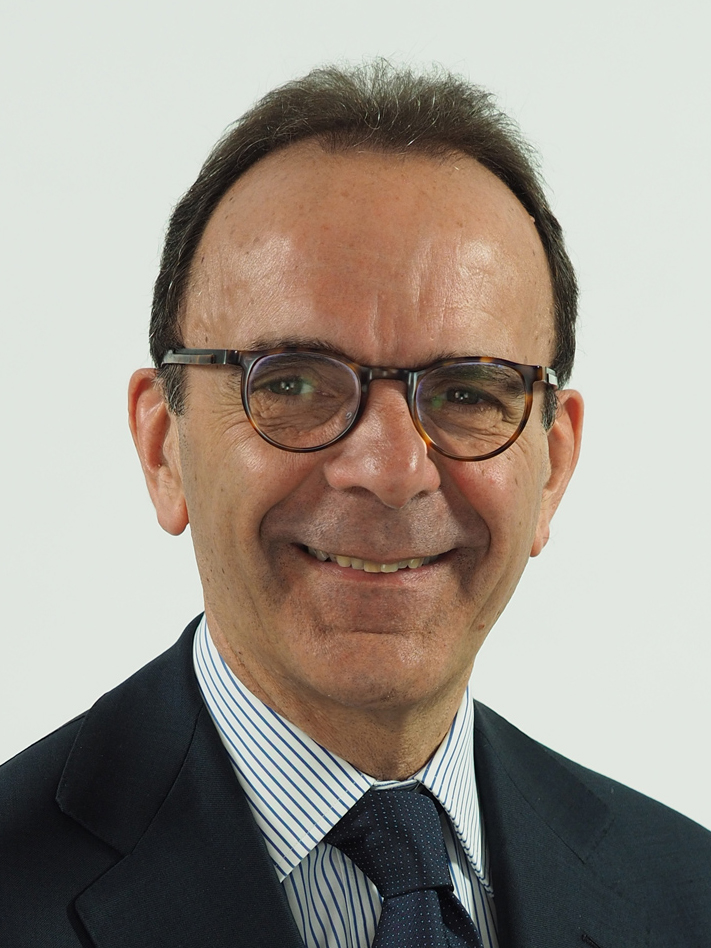
Candidate	Giuseppe Sala	Stefano Parisi
Party	Independent	Independent
Alliance	Centre-left	Centre-right
1st Round vote	224,156	219,218
Percentage	41.7%	40.8%
2nd Round vote	264,481	247,052
Percentage	51.7%	48.3%
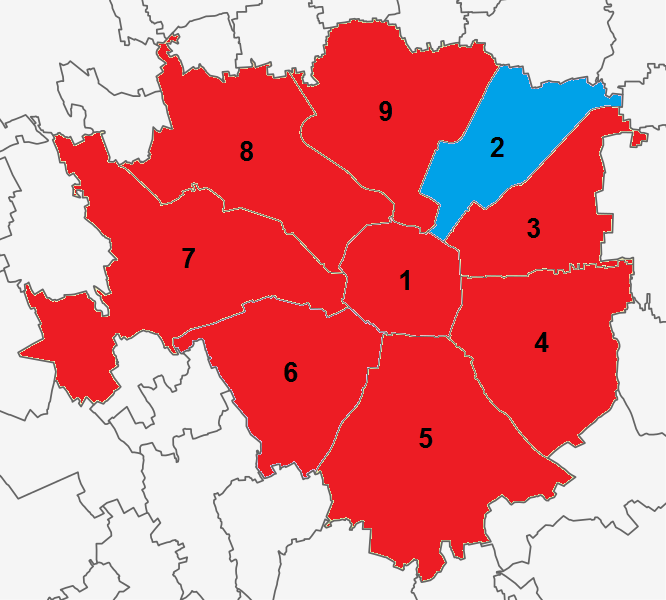
- Result of second round voting by Milan municipalities. Red municipalities are those with most votes for Sala and Azure those for Parisi.
Mayor before election
Giuliano Pisapia
Independent
Elected mayor
Giuseppe Sala
Independent
- City Council election
- All 48 seats in City Council; 25 seats needed for a majority
Party	Leader	Vote %	Seats	+/–
Centre-left	Giuseppe Sala	41.20	29	0
Centre-right	Stefano Parisi	40.99	15	−2
M5S	Gianluca Corrado	10.40	3	+2
MiC	Basilio Rizzo	3.50	1	−1
This lists parties that won seats. See the complete results below.

Municipal elections were held in Milan on 5 and 19 June 2016 to elect the Mayor and the 48 members of the City Council, as well as the nine presidents and 270 councillors of the nine administrative zones in which the municipality is divided, each one having one president and 30 councillors.

Incumbent Mayor Giuliano Pisapia choose not to run for re-election for a second term in office.

As no candidate won a majority in the first round, a runoff was held between the top two candidates – Giuseppe Sala, an independent business executive and Milan Expo 2015 CEO, close to the Democratic Party (PD), and Stefano Parisi, former CEO of the telecommunication company Fastweb close to Silvio Berlusconi's Forza Italia (FI) – which Sala won by a narrow margin.

The new Mayor was also appointed by law as general Mayor of the former Province of Milan now called Metropolitan City of Milan.

== Background ==
=== Centre-left primary election ===
On 22 March 2015, the incumbent Mayor Giuliano Pisapia announced that he had chosen not to run for re-election in 2016 for a second term in office. Following Pisapia's decision, the ruling centre-left coalition decided to call an open primary election to choose a new mayoral candidate.

Four people registered to be candidates in this election: Giuseppe Sala, business executive and Milan Expo 2015 CEO; Francesca Balzani, deputy mayor, responsible for Budget in the Milan's municipal government and former MEP; Pierfrancesco Majorino, responsible for Social Equalities in the municipal government of the city; Antonio Iannetta, former president of UISP (Italian Sport Union for Everyone).

The election took place on 6–7 February 2016:

Candidate	Party	Votes	%
Giuseppe Sala	Independent	25,600	42.33
Francesca Balzani	PD	20,516	33.92
Pierfrancesco Majorino	PD	13,916	23.01
Antonio Iannetta	Independent	443	0.73
Total		60,475	100.00

Total voters: 60,900

=== Centre-right candidacy ===
On 10 February 2016, Stefano Parisi, former City manager of Milan (1997-2001), announced his acceptance to become the centre-right coalition candidate for the mayoral election, a role proposed to him by the former Prime Minister Silvio Berlusconi. Parisi is also the former CEO of the telecommunication company Fastweb; Parisi in last 2015 was the manager of Corrado Passera's early mayoral campaign for their party, Unique Italy: Passera retired to run for Major when Parisi resigned after a meeting with Berlusconi.

=== Others ===
On 8 November 2015, the anti-establishment Five Star Movement choose its own candidate with a closed primary election. The 52-year-old unemployed activist Patrizia Bedori was chosen as official mayoral candidate. On that date no official data were provided by the movement. However, on 12 March 2016 Bedori stepped down from the candidacy, saying tearful during an assembly that she wasn't the right person to represent the movement. Afterwards on 24 March 2016 with a closed virtual primary on the web, the Five Star Movement choose its new candidate, Gianluca Corrado, who received 632 votes out of 876.

== Voting system ==
The semipresidential voting system is used for all mayoral elections in Italy of cities with a population higher than 15,000 for the sixth time. Under this system voters express a direct choice for the mayor or an indirect choice voting for the party of the candidate's coalition. If no candidate receives at least 50% of votes, the top two candidates go to a second round after two weeks. This gives a result whereby the winning candidate may be able to claim majority support.

For the zones the voting system is the same, not referred to the mayor but to the president of the zones.

The election of the City Council is based on a direct choice for the candidate with a preference vote: the candidate with the majority of the preferences is elected. The number of the seats for each losing party is determined proportionally.

== Parties and candidates ==
This is a list of the major parties (and their respective leaders) which participated in the election.

Political party or alliance	Constituent lists	Candidate
Centre-left coalition	Democratic Party	Giuseppe Sala
Centre-left coalition	Beppe Sala for Mayor – We, Milan	Giuseppe Sala
Centre-left coalition	Left for Milan (incl. FdV)	Giuseppe Sala
Centre-left coalition	Italy of Values	Giuseppe Sala
Centre-right coalition	Forza Italia	Stefano Parisi
Centre-right coalition	Northern League	Stefano Parisi
Centre-right coalition	Brothers of Italy	Stefano Parisi
Centre-right coalition	Popular Area	Stefano Parisi
Centre-right coalition	Unique Italy	Stefano Parisi
Centre-right coalition	Pensioners' Party	Stefano Parisi
Milan in Common (incl. PRC, PCdI, POS, AET and PU)		Basilio Rizzo
Five Star Movement		Gianluca Corrado
Italian Radicals		Marco Cappato

== Results ==
Summary of the 2016 Milan City Council and Mayoral election results
Candidates	1st round		2nd round		Leader's seat	Parties	Votes	%	Seats
Candidates	Votes	%	Votes	%	Leader's seat	Parties	Votes	%	Seats
Giuseppe Sala	224,156	41.70	264,481	51.70	–	Democratic Party	145,933	28.97	22
Giuseppe Sala	224,156	41.70	264,481	51.70	–	Beppe Sala for Mayor – We, Milan	38,674	7.68	5
Giuseppe Sala	224,156	41.70	264,481	51.70	–	Left for Milan	19,281	3.83	2
Giuseppe Sala	224,156	41.70	264,481	51.70	–	Italy of Values	3,454	0.69	–
Giuseppe Sala	224,156	41.70	264,481	51.70	–	Total	207,342	41.20	29
Stefano Parisi	219,218	40.78	247,052	48.30	check	Forza Italia	101,802	20.21	8
Stefano Parisi	219,218	40.78	247,052	48.30	check	Northern League	59,313	11.77	4
Stefano Parisi	219,218	40.78	247,052	48.30	check	Popular Milan	15,803	3.14	1
Stefano Parisi	219,218	40.78	247,052	48.30	check	Parisi List – Unique Milan	15,215	3.02	1
Stefano Parisi	219,218	40.78	247,052	48.30	check	Brothers of Italy	12,197	2.42	–
Stefano Parisi	219,218	40.78	247,052	48.30	check	Pensioners' Party	2,164	0.43	–
Stefano Parisi	219,218	40.78	247,052	48.30	check	Total	206,494	40.99	14
Gianluca Corrado	54,099	10.06	–	–	check	Five Star Movement	52,376	10.40	2
Basilio Vincenzo Rizzo	19,143	3.56	–	–	check	Milan in Common	17,635	3.50	–
Marco Cappato	10,104	1.88	–	–	–	Ecologist Lay Federalist Radicals	9,390	1.86	–
Nicolò Mardegan	6,018	1.12	–	–	–	The People of the Family	5,804	1.15	–
Natale Azzaretto	2,220	0.41	–	–	–	Workers' Communist Party	2,108	0.42	–
Luigi Santambrogio	1,483	0.28	–	–	–	Municipal Alternative	1,477	0.29	–
Maria Teresa Baldini	1,143	0.21	–	–	–	Fuxia People	1,095	0.22	–
Total	537,584	100.00	511,533	100.00	3		503,721	100.00	45
Eligible voters	1,006,701	100.00	1,006,701	100.00					
Voted	550,194	54.65	521,487	51.80					
Did not vote	456,507	45.35	485,214	48.20					
Blank or invalid ballots	12,610	2.30	9,954	1.90					
Total valid votes	537,584	97.70	511,533	98.10					
Source: Ministry of the Interior

Note: if a defeated candidate for Mayor obtained over 3% of votes, the mayoral candidate is automatically elected city councilor.

The candidate elected Major is not a member of the City Council, but has the right to vote in the City Council; if Stefano Parisi will resign, his seat in the City Council will pass to Riccardo De Corato (former Deputy Major, 1997-2011), first candidate of Brothers of Italy (FdI), because this list is the first list in the coalition under the electoral threshold.

Popular vote
PD	28.97%
FI	20.20%
LN	11.77%
M5S	10.39%
Sala list	7.67%
SxM	3.82%
MC	3.50%
MP	3.13%
Others	10.55%

Council Seats
PD	45.83%
FI	18.75%
Sala list	10.42%
LN	8.33%
M5S	6.25%
SxM	4.12%
MC	2.1%
MP	2.1%
Others	2.1%

Popular vote (coalition)
CSX	41.16%
CDX	40.99%
M5S	10.06%
MC	3.56%

Council Seats (coalition)
CSX	60.42%
CDX	31.25%
M5S	6.25%
MC	2.10%

== Results by municipio ==
=== Presidents and Councils ===
The 9 municipi

After the 2011 election, all nine municipi were governed by the centre-left. Following the 2016 election, five were gained by the centre-right coalition and four by the centre-left.

Table below shows the results for each municipio with the percentage for each candidate and president elected:

Municipio	CSX		CDX		M5S		Others		Elected President	Party
Municipio	votes	%	votes	%	votes	%	votes	%	Elected President	Party
1	18,081	45.2	16,515	41.3	2,422	6.1	2,984	6.4	Fabio Luigi Arrigoni	PD
2	20,795	38.5	23,314	43.1	6,269	11.6	3,682	6.9	Samuele Piscina	LN
3	25,956	43.7	23,068	38.8	5,701	9.6	4,696	7.8	Caterina Antola	PD
4	25,149	41.2	25,368	41.6	6,392	10.5	4,111	6.8	Paolo Guido Giancarlo Maria Bassi	LN
5	19,563	40.7	19,684	41.0	5,676	11.8	3,104	8.4	Alessandro Bramanti	NCD
6	24,738	41.7	23,860	40.2	6,800	11.5	3,942	6.7	Santo Minniti	PD
7	27,019	39.7	28,852	42.3	7,740	11.4	4,496	6.6	Marco Bestetti	FI
8	30,526	42.6	28,836	40.2	7,904	11.0	4,432	6.1	Simone Zambelli	SI
9	26,295	38.9	27,638	40.9	8,720	12.9	4,904	7.2	Giuseppe Antonio Lardieri	FI

Source: Municipality of Milan - Electoral Service

Table below shows the seats for each coalition in every Municipal Council:

Municipio	CSX	CDX	M5S	Others	Total
1	18	11	1	–	30
2	9	18	3	–	30
3	18	10	2	–	30
4	10	18	2	–	30
5	10	18	2	–	30
6	18	10	2	–	30
7	10	18	2	–	30
8	18	10	2	–	30
9	9	18	3	–	30
Total	120	131	19	–	270

Source: Municipality of Milan - Electoral Service

=== Mayoral votes ===
==== Second round ====
Table below shows the results of the votes for mayoral candidates on the second round (19 June 2016) in each municipio:

Municipio	Giuseppe Sala	Stefano Parisi	Turnout
1	21,966 (52.6%)	19,808 (47.4%)	50.7%
2	25,527 (49.6%)	25,948 (50.4%)	51.8%
3	32,367 (55.0%)	26,452 (45.0%)	54.2%
4	30,506 (51.4%)	28,801 (48.6%)	52.0%
5	23,936 (52.2%)	21,929 (47.8%)	50.7%
6	29,941 (52.5%)	27,074 (47.5%)	50.7%
7	32,701 (50.2%)	32,386 (49.8%)	52.1%
8	35,041 (50.9%)	33,735 (49.1%)	52.1%
9	32,402 (51.1%)	31,016 (48.9%)	51.4%

== See also ==
- 2016 Italian local elections
