= Corrado Passera =

Italian manager and banker

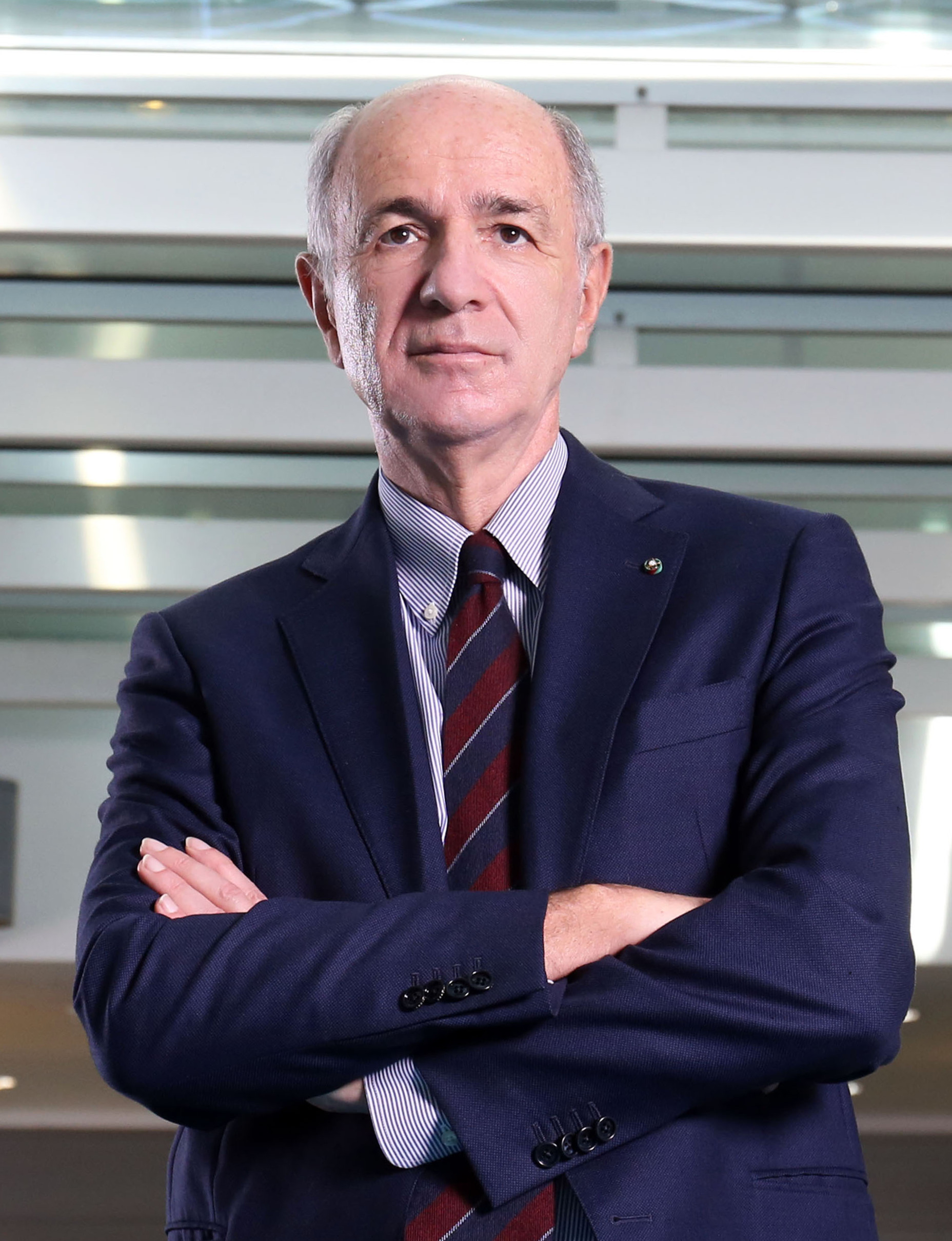

Minister of Infrastructure and Transport
- In office 16 November 2011 – 28 April 2013
- Prime Minister: Mario Monti
- Preceded by: Altero Matteoli
- Succeeded by: Maurizio Lupi

Minister of Economic Development
- In office 16 November 2011 – 28 April 2013
- Prime Minister: Mario Monti
- Preceded by: Paolo Romani
- Succeeded by: Flavio Zanonato

Personal details
- Born: 30 December 1954 (age 71) Como, Italy
- Party: Independent (2011–2014); Italia Unica (2014–2016)
- Spouse: Giovanna Salza (m. 2011)
- Children: 5 children
- Education: Bocconi University; Wharton School (MBA)
- Profession: Manager, banker

Corrado Passera (born 30 December 1954 in Como, Italy) is an Italian manager and banker, who has served as Minister of Economic Development and Infrastructure and Transport in the Mario Monti Cabinet.

== Biography ==
Corrado Passera was born into a family of entrepreneurs. He graduated in Business Economics from Bocconi University in 1977 and obtained a master in Business Administration from the Wharton School of the University of Pennsylvania in 1980.

=== Professional career ===
He began his professional career in 1980 at McKinsey, where he remained for five years, focusing on the reorganization and revitalization of banking, insurance, and service companies both in Italy and abroad. Then he moved to CIR, the holding company of the De Benedetti Group, where he first served as the CEO's assistant and later as General Manager from 1988 to 1990. During those years, he worked on financial projects, including the creation of a new core shareholder group for Credito Romagnolo, where he served as Vice President from 1987 to 1995.

Between 1991 and 1992 he first served as Chief Operating Officer of the Mondadori Group and then as Vice President and CEO of Editoriale L'Espresso-Repubblica, leading the company to be listed on the stock exchange. Subsequently, he became Co-CEO of the Olivetti Group, which was facing a deep crisis at the time. There, he oversaw the company's entry into the telecommunications sector, leading to the creation of Omnitel and Infostrada.

In 1996, he was appointed CEO and General Manager of Banco Ambroveneto where, the following year, he managed the banking consolidation operation with Cariplo, which led to the creation of Banca Intesa. Two years later, the then Ministry of the Treasury appointed him CEO of Poste Italiane, with the task of restructuring the company, which was in serious crisis at the time. Under his leadership, the company entered into the financial services sector through the creation of Bancoposta and Poste Vita. By 2002, the company had achieved economic recovery, posting its first profit.

In the same year, Passera left Poste Italiane to return to the banking world as CEO of IntesaBCI. In the summer of 2006, he managed the merger between the bank and Sanpaolo IMI, which led to the creation of Intesa Sanpaolo, where he served as Director and CEO until 2011. The following year, he promoted the establishment of Banca Prossima, a Third Sector bank dedicated to social enterprises.

He founded Encyclomedia Publishers in 2010, a publishing project in collaboration with Umberto Eco, aimed at producing the first History of European Civilization designed for new digital media, with both educational and widespread cultural updating purposes. The project was also presented at the UN in 2013 and was completed in terms of content in the winter of 2015.

On 18 January 2018, Passera founded "Spaxs", a SPAC active in the financial sector. Following the merger with Banca Interprovinciale in September of that year, he created illimity, a banking group dedicated to small and medium-sized enterprises with potential, listed on the STAR segment of Borsa Italiana since September 2020.

=== Political career ===
In 2011, Corrado Passera was appointed by President Giorgio Napolitano Minister of Economic Development and Minister of Infrastructure and Transport in the Monti government, roles he held until the end of the administration in April 2013.

On 23 February 2014, Corrado Passera founded the political movement Italia Unica and in June of the following year, at the end of the national leadership meeting of Italia Unica in Milan, he announced his intention to run for Mayor of Milan in the upcoming local elections. However, a year later, he withdrew from the mayoral race, simultaneously announcing his support for the official center-right coalition candidate, Stefano Parisi. On 30 September 2016, the National Assembly of Italia Unica decided to dissolve the party.

== Other roles ==
- Member of the Board of Directors at Bocconi University and the Fondazione Teatro alla Scala.
- Member of the Board of Directors of Finmeccanica and Crédit Agricole in Paris.
- Advisor and member of the Executive Committee of the Italian Banking Association.
- Member of the International Advisory Board of McKinsey & Company, the Wharton School of Philadelphia, and the Scuola Normale Superiore of Pisa.
- Member of the Board of the International Institute of Finance in Washington, D.C.
- Member of the General Council of the Giorgio Cini Foundation in Venice.
- Member of the International Business Council and the Global Agenda Councils of the World Economic Forum.
- Since 22 February 2019, he has served as the President of the Imola International Academy Foundation "Incontri con il Maestro".

== Honours and recognitions ==
Grand Officer of the Order of Merit of the Italian Republic: 27 December 2005.

Knight of the Order of Merit for Labour: 1 June 2006, appointed by the President of the Italian Republic Giorgio Napolitano.

He has received an honorary degree in Management Engineering from the Polytechnic University of Bari and an honorary master in International Business from the MIB Trieste School of Management.

Business positions
| New title | CEO of Poste Italiane; 1998–2002 | Succeeded by Massimo Sarmi |
| Preceded by Lino Benassi | CEO of Banca Intesa; 2002–2006 | Merged with Sanpaolo IMI |
| New title | CEO of Intesa Sanpaolo; 2007–2011 | Succeeded by Enrico Tomaso Cucchiani |
Political offices
| Preceded by Altero Matteoli | Italian Minister of Transports and Infrastructures; 2011–2013 | Succeeded by Maurizio Lupi |
| Preceded by Paolo Romani | Italian Minister of Economic Development; 2011–2013 | Succeeded by Flavio Zanonato |
