= Majorino =

Majorino is a surname. Notable people with the surname include:

- Pierfrancesco Majorino (born 1973), Italian politician
- Tina Majorino (born 1985), American actress

== See also ==
- Maiorino, surname
