= PosteMobile =

Telephone operator of Italian Post

PosteMobile S.p.A.

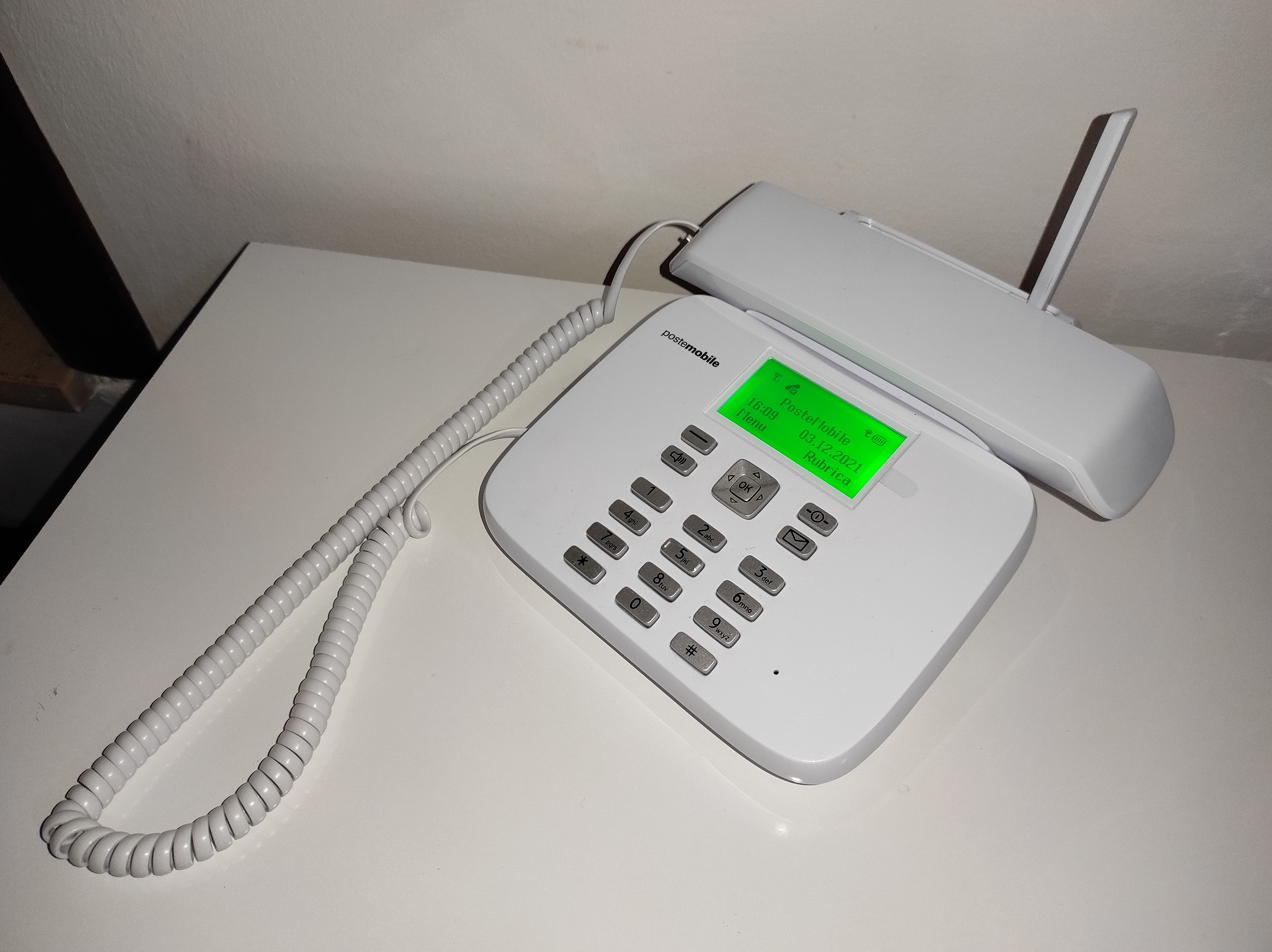
- Handset telephone with PosteMobile SIM
- Company type: Subsidiary
- Industry: Telecommunications
- Founded: November 26, 2007; 18 years ago
- Founder: Poste Italiane
- Headquarters: Rome, Italy
- Area served: Italy
- Key people: Roberto Giacchi (Chairman, CEO)
- Products: Mobile and fixed-line telephony
- Revenue: 234,543,000 euro (2017)
- Net income: 18,659,000 euro (2017)
- Owners: Postepay (100%)
- Parent: Poste Italiane
- Website: www.postemobile.it

PosteMobile is an Italian telecommunications company owned by Poste Italiane through Postepay, which operates in the mobile telephony sector as Mobile Virtual Network Operator (Full MVNO) on the Vodafone network and, since 2017, it also offers fixed-line telephony and Internet services.

Since December 2016, PosteMobile is the title sponsor of the Italian Lega Basket Serie A (LBA).

The Ministry of Economic Development has assigned the operator PosteMobile five decades of the prefix 371 (371-1, 371–3, 371–4, 371–5, 371–6).

== History ==
Former logo of PosteMobile (2007-2018)

On April 5, 2007, the agreement between Poste Italiane and Vodafone was made official which envisages the birth of PosteMobile. It was precisely on November 15 of the same year that the company began to enter the mobile telephony sector, starting the sale of SIM cards initially available only to postal employees. On November 26, PosteMobile launches its first public offer: after about 10 days from the launch, customers increased to reach 40,000 people. And at the end of 2007 the share of approximately 140,000.

On 11 April 2008 PosteMobile launched its mobile banking services called "SIMplify" thanks to the technical support of Gemalto, later renamed "SIMply BancoPosta", and in 2009, precisely on 3 July, PosteMobile announced that it had reached one million customers.

On 1 April 2011, Poste Italiane conferred on PosteMobile the "Rete TLC Fissa" business branch which manages the entire geographical network of post offices and operational and administrative offices of Poste Italiane.

In 2013, PosteMobile changed its network operator, relying on the Wind network.

In April 2017, PosteMobile entered the world of fixed-line telephony services with the launch of the "PosteMobile Casa" offer.

Since 2021 PosteMobile returns to operate on the Vodafone network.
