= 2018 Lazio regional election =

← 2013	4 March 2018	2023 →

All 51 seats to the Regional Council of Lazio
- Turnout: 66.6% (▼5.4%)
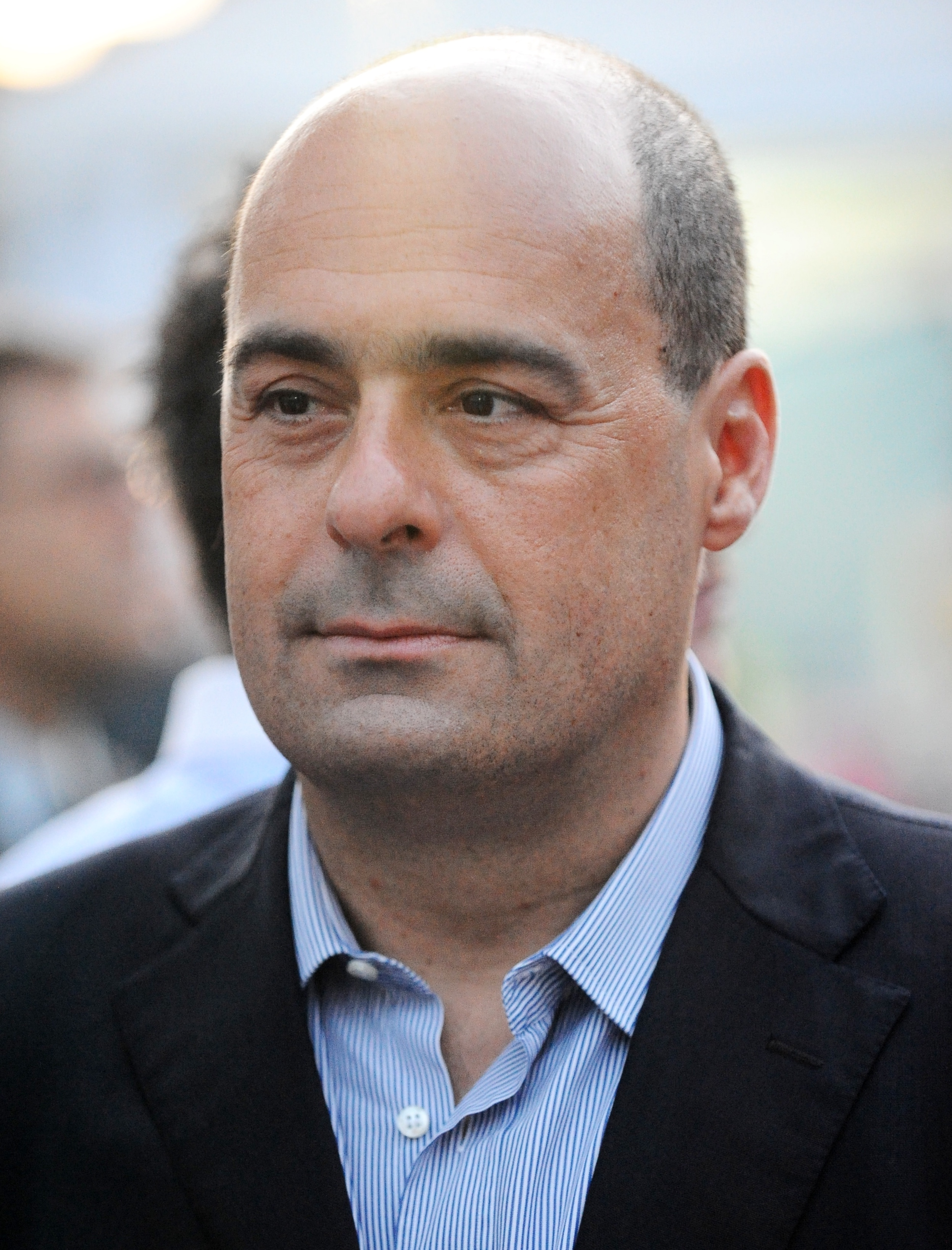

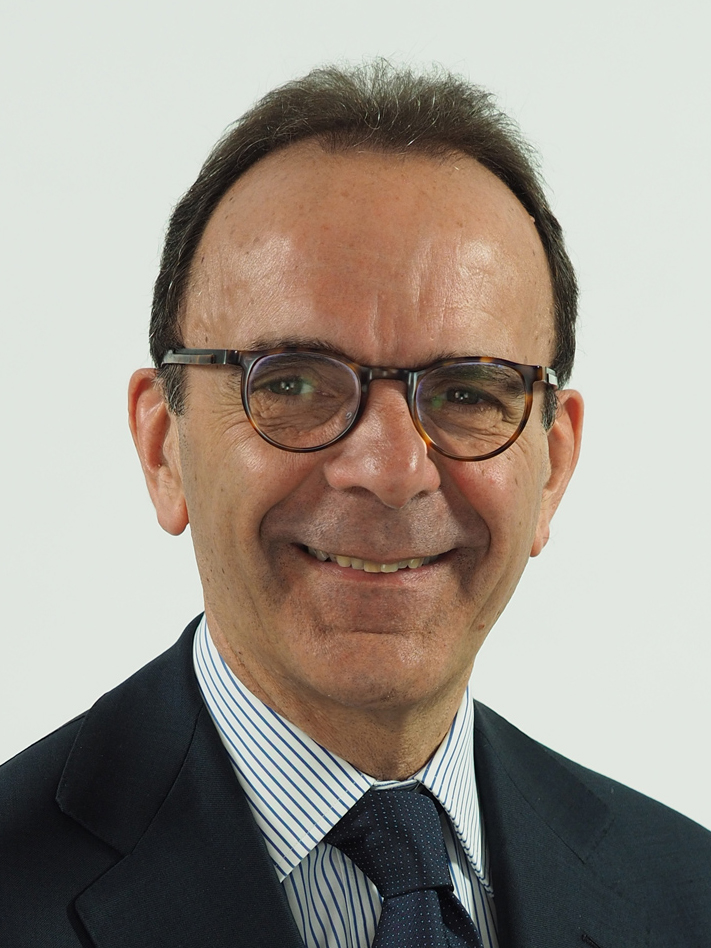

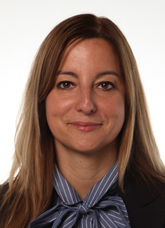
	Majority party	Minority party	Third party
Leader	Nicola Zingaretti	Stefano Parisi	Roberta Lombardi
Party	Democratic Party	Energies for Italy	Five Star Movement
Alliance	Centre-left	Centre-right	None
Seats won	25	15	10
Seat change	▼3	▲2	▲3
Popular vote	1,018,736	964,418	834,995
Percentage	32.9%	31.2%	27.0%
Swing	▼7.8%	▲1.9%	▲6.8%
- Map of both presidential and legislative elections.
President before election
Nicola Zingaretti
Democratic Party
President-elect
Nicola Zingaretti
Democratic Party

The Lazio regional election of 2018 took place in Lazio, Italy, on 4 March 2018, concurrently with the Italian general election and the Lombard regional election.

The election was won by centre-left incumbent President Nicola Zingaretti, with just under a third of the vote, over the centre-right one Stefano Parisi, who gain 31%, and the Five Star Movement's candidate Roberta Lombardi with 27%.

== Electoral system ==
The Regional Council is elected with a mixed system: 39 MPs are chosen with a form of proportional representation using a largest remainder method with open lists and a 5% threshold, while 11 MPs are elected with a block voting system with closed lists. One seat is for the elected president.

RM	LT	VT	FR	RT	Total
30	3	3	3	0	39

== Parties and candidate ==
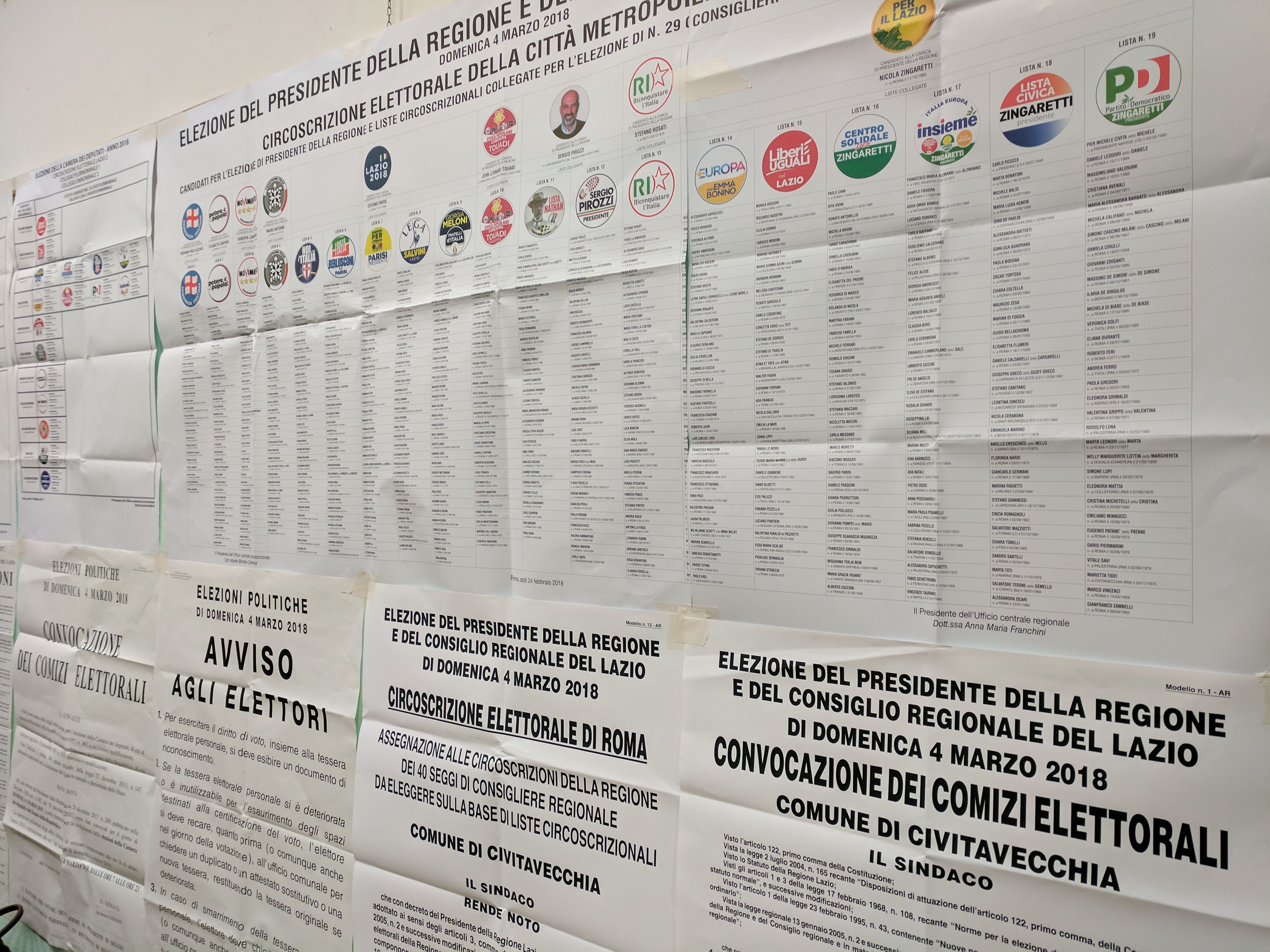
Candidate lists at a Rome polling station (4 March 2018).jpg

Political party or alliance	Constituent lists	Previous result		Candidate
Political party or alliance	Constituent lists	Votes (%)	Seats	Candidate
Centre-left	Democratic Party	29.7	13	Nicola Zingaretti
Centre-left	Zingaretti List	4.5	2	Nicola Zingaretti
Centre-left	Free and Equal	—	—	Nicola Zingaretti
Centre-left	More Europe	—	—	Nicola Zingaretti
Centre-left	Solidary Centre	—	—	Nicola Zingaretti
Centre-left	Together	—	—	Nicola Zingaretti
Centre-right	Forza Italia (incl. Cuoritaliani)	21.2	9	Stefano Parisi
Centre-right	League	—	—	Stefano Parisi
Centre-right	Brothers of Italy	3.8	1	Stefano Parisi
Centre-right	Us with Italy – UDC	—	—	Stefano Parisi
Centre-right	Energies for Italy	—	—	Stefano Parisi
Five Star Movement		16.6	7	Roberta Lombardi
Pirozzi for President	Pirozzi list	—	—	Sergio Pirozzi
Pirozzi for President	PLI – PRI	—	—	Sergio Pirozzi
CasaPound		0.7	–	Mauro Antonini
Popular Civic List		—	—	Jean Leonard Touadi
Power to the People		—	—	Elisabetta Canitano
Christian Democracy		—	—	Giovanni Paolo Azzaro
Reconquer Italy		—	—	Stefano Rosati

== Opinion polls ==
Date	Polling firm	Zingaretti	Parisi	Lombardi	Pirozzi	Others	Lead
15 Feb 2018	Index Research	37.0	27.0	25.5	7.5	3.0	10.0
13 Feb 2018	Termometro Politico	30.9	25.0	27.0	10.7	6.4	3.9
12 Feb 2018	Ipsos	33.0	22.0	29.0	12.0	4.0	4.0
8 Feb 2018	Index Research	39.0	26.0	23.5	8.5	3.0	13.0
2 Feb 2018	Piepoli	40.0	17.0	26.5	7.0	9.5	13.5
30 Jan–1 Feb 2018	Izi	36.6	23.2	25.7	11.7	2.8	10.9
18 Jan 2018	Index Research	45.0	20.0	20.0	11.0	4.0	25.0
8–10 Jan 2018	Index Research	44.0	25.0	20.0	8.0	3.0	19.0

== Results ==
4 March 2018 Lazio regional election results
Candidates	Votes	%	Seats	Parties	Votes	%	Seats
Nicola Zingaretti	1,018,736	32.93	1				
Nicola Zingaretti	1,018,736	32.93	1	Democratic Party	539,131	21.25	18
Nicola Zingaretti	1,018,736	32.93	1	Zingaretti List	110,080	4.34	3
Nicola Zingaretti	1,018,736	32.93	1	Free and Equal	88,416	3.48	1
Nicola Zingaretti	1,018,736	32.93	1	More Europe	52,451	2.07	1
Nicola Zingaretti	1,018,736	32.93	1	Solidary Centre	48,872	1.93	1
Nicola Zingaretti	1,018,736	32.93	1	Together	28,443	1.12	–
Nicola Zingaretti	1,018,736	32.93	1	Total	867,393	34.19	24
Stefano Parisi	964,757	31.18	1				
Stefano Parisi	964,757	31.18	1	Forza Italia	371,155	14.63	6
Stefano Parisi	964,757	31.18	1	League	252,772	9.96	4
Stefano Parisi	964,757	31.18	1	Brothers of Italy	220,460	8.69	3
Stefano Parisi	964,757	31.18	1	Us with Italy–UDC	41.234	1.63	1
Stefano Parisi	964,757	31.18	1	Energies for Italy	37,043	1.46	–
Stefano Parisi	964,757	31.18	1	Total	922,664	36.37	14
Roberta Lombardi	835,137	26.99	–	Five Star Movement	559,752	22.06	10
Sergio Pirozzi	151,339	4.89	–				
Sergio Pirozzi	151,339	4.89	–	Sergio Pirozzi for President	93,942	3.70	1
Sergio Pirozzi	151,339	4.89	–	Nathan List (PLI–PRI)	3,443	0.14	–
Sergio Pirozzi	151,339	4.89	–	Total	97,385	3.84	1
Mauro Antonini	59,898	1.94	–	CasaPound	42,609	1.68	–
Elisabetta Canitano	43,895	1.42	–	Power to the People	33,372	1.32	–
Jean Leonard Touadi	7,708	0.25	–	Popular Civic List	6,073	0.24	–
Giovanni Paolo Azzaro	7,614	0.25	–	Christian Democracy	5,325	0.21	–
Rosati Stefano	4,952	0.16	–	Reconquer Italy	2,565	0.10	–
Total candidates	3,094,036	100.00	2	Total parties	2,537,138	100.00	49
Source: Ministry of the Interior

== Aftermath ==
=== 2018 motion of no confidence ===
On 1 December 2018, a motion of no confidence in the government of Nicola Zingaretti tabled by centre-right coalition was defeated 22 to 26, with one no-vote of Forza Italia and a few absent.

Motion of no confidence
Ballot →	1 December 2018
Required majority →	26 out of 51
Yes: • M5S (10); • FI (3); • League (3); • FdI (3); • NcI (1); • EpI (1); • Mixed Group (1)	22 / 51
No: • PD (19); • Zingaretti (3); • LeU (1); • +E (1); • CS (1); • FI (1)	26 / 51
Abstentions	0 / 51
Absentees: • Pirozzi (1); • FI (1); • Mixed Group (1)	3 / 51
