= Energies for Italy =

Italian political party

Energies for Italy Energie per l'Italia
- Leader: Stefano Parisi
- Founded: 18 November 2016
- Dissolved: 17 December 2020
- Headquarters: Viale Scarampo 49; 20148 Milan
- Ideology: Liberalism
- Political position: Centre
- National affiliation: Centre-right coalition
- Colours: Gold

Website
- www.energieperlitalia.com

Energies for Italy (Italian: Energie per l'Italia, EpI) was a political party in Italy, launched in November 2016 and officially established on 1 April 2017. Its leader is Stefano Parisi, a former director-general of Confindustria and CEO of Fastweb, who was an unsuccessful candidate for mayor in the 2016 Milan municipal election.

== History ==
In the run-up of the 2016 Milan municipal election, Stefano Parisi was selected by Silvio Berlusconi as the candidate for mayor for Forza Italia (FI). In the election, Parisi pulled the party to 20.2%, but however narrowly lost to his Democratic opponent, Giuseppe Sala, in the run-off. After asking Parisi to reform the party, in November Berlusconi disowned him, due to his difficult political relationship with the party's major ally, Lega Nord (LN). Parisi thus launched his own party, EpI, and soon came to terms again with LN, aiming at being part of the same centre-right coalition.

In March 2017 Maurizio Sacconi, senator and former minister, who had been a member of the Italian Socialist Party (like Parisi), the old Forza Italia (FI) and the New Centre-Right (NCD), joined EpI, after stepping down from NCD Senate leader in February 2015 and later refusing to join the NCD-sponsored Popular Alternative (AP).

Later on, the party was joined by another senator (Gabriele Albertini) and five deputies (Domenico Menorello, Giovanni Monchiero, Dino Secco, Gugliemo Vaccaro and Gianluigi Gigli), mostly splinters of FI, NCD/AP and Civic Choice (SC). In September 2017 EpI joined forces with "The Marianne", a liberal political association led by Giovanni Negri (a former secretary of the Radical Party). In November 2017, the Civics and Innovators sub-group in the Chamber, led by Monchiero, was renamed "Civics and Innovators – Energies for Italy".

On 13 January 2018, EpI and CI launched a joint list named "Energies for Italy – for the Centre-right", allied with Silvio Berlusconi's Forza Italia.

On 17 December 2020 Parisi declared his farewell to politics to return to being an entrepreneur, recalling the unsuccessful attempt to give the center-right a liberal-popular impulse.

== Electoral results ==
=== Regional Councils ===
Region	Last election	# of overall votes	% of overall vote	# of overall seats won	+/−
Sicily	2017	with Diventerà Bellissima		0 / 70	–
Lombardy	2018	27,967 (#15)	0.53	1 / 80	▲1
Lazio	2018	37,043 (#13)	1.46	1 / 50	▲1
Abruzzo	2019	19,446 (#8)	3.24	1 / 31	▲1
Sardinia	2019	3,471 (#23)	0.49	0 / 60	-
Piedmont	2019	with NMS		0 / 51	–

== Leadership ==
- Secretary: Stefano Parisi (2017–2020)

== Symbols ==
Electoral logo
