= Maiolino =

Maiolino is a surname. Notable people with the surname include:

- Anna Maria Maiolino (born 1942), Italian-Brazilian artist
- Wesley Alex Maiolino (born 1988), Brazilian footballer

== See also ==
- Maiorino
