= Paolo Romani =

Italian politician (born 1947)

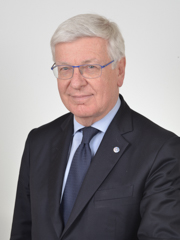

Minister of Economic Development
- In office 4 October 2010 – 16 November 2011
- Prime Minister: Silvio Berlusconi
- Preceded by: Claudio Scajola
- Succeeded by: Corrado Passera

Member of the Senate
- In office 15 March 2013 – 13 October 2022

Member of the Chamber of Deputies
- In office 15 April 1994 – 15 March 2013

Personal details
- Born: 18 September 1947 (age 79) Milan, Italy
- Party: Cambiamo! (since 2019)
- Other political affiliations: PLI (until 1994); Forza Italia (1994-2009); PdL (2009-2013); Forza Italia (2013-2019)

Paolo Romani (born 18 September 1947) is an Italian politician, publisher, journalist and former minister of economic development.

== Early life ==
Romani was born in Milan on 18 September 1947. He has a high school diploma.

== Career ==
Romani worked as a television executive in Italy. He joined Silvio Berlusconi's Forza Italia party in 1994. In 2008, he was elected to the Italian parliament and served as deputy minister of communications from 30 June 2009 to 4 October 2010.

Romani was appointed minister of economic development to the fourth Berlusconi cabinet on 4 October 2010. He replaced Silvio Berlusconi as minister who had led the ministry since May 2010. Romani's term ended when he was replaced by Corrado Passera as minister on 16 November 2011.
