= Roberta Lombardi =

Italian politician

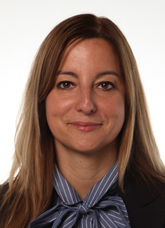

Member of the Chamber of Deputies
- In office 15 March 2013 – 22 March 2018
- Constituency: Lazio 1

Personal details
- Born: 15 August 1973 (age 53) Orbetello, Tuscany, Italy
- Party: Five Star Movement
- Children: 2
- Education: Sapienza University of Rome

Roberta Lombardi (born 15 August 1973) is an Italian politician.

== Biography ==
Roberta Lombardi was born in Orbetello in 1973, to parents from Boville Ernica in southern Lazio where she grew up. She graduated in law from La Sapienza University of Rome with a thesis in international commercial law and followed a course in managerial development at LUISS University. Since 2004 she has worked at an interior design company.

In 2008, she ran in the municipal elections of Rome with the civic list "Friends of Beppe Grillo" and obtained 191 preference votes, without being elected. She then joined the Five Star Movement since its foundation. In 2013 she was elected to the Chamber of Deputies in the Lazio 1 constituency.

From 19 March to 24 July 2013 she was chairman of the M5S Group in the Chamber (but by virtue of the group's internal regulations, which provided for the quarterly rotation of the office, she ceded unofficially the function of chairman of the group to Riccardo Nuti already on 5 June 2013).

She was a candidate for President in the 2018 Lazio regional election, getting 27.0% of preferences and finishing third, behind Stefano Parisi and Nicola Zingaretti. Since 4 March 2018 she is councilor of the Lazio Region and leader of the M5S group in the Regional Council of Lazio.
