= Maiorino =

Maiorino is a surname. Notable people with the surname include:

- Alessandra Maiorino (born 1974), Italian politician
- Eduardo Maiorino (1979–2012), Brazilian kickboxer and martial artist
- Pasquale Maiorino (born 1989), Italian footballer

== See also ==
- Maiolino, surname
- Majorino, surname
