= Francesco Caio =

Italian businessman

- Born: August 23, 1957 (age 69)
- Occupations: Chief Executive Officer - Saipem S.p.A., Milan

Francesco Caio (born August 23, 1957) is an Italian businessman and the Chief Executive Officer of Saipem since May 2021.

He also serves on the Board of Directors of BNL - BNP as non executive director and chairman of the remuneration committee.

== Personal life ==
Francesco Caio was born in Naples on August 23, 1957. He is married with two children.

== Career and education ==
Francesco Caio has a wide international experience as Chief Executive of listed and private multinational corporations operating in High Tech, Finance and Service sectors. He graduated with distinction in Electronic Engineering from the Polytechnic University of Milan in 1980, before earning two postgraduate degrees: one in Computer Science from the Polytechnic University of Milan and one in Business Administration (MBA) from INSEAD (Fontainebleau, France). His career started working as Telecommunication Systems Product Manager for Olivetti (1982–83) and as Business Planner for Sarin (1984). From 1986 to 1991, he worked for McKinsey & Company in London, where he was a strategy and development consultant to multinational clients in the electronics, telecommunications and media industries.

From 1991 to 1992, he went back to Olivetti, at the time dealing with a corporate restructuring; at the end of this process, a group of shareholders captained by Olivetti founded Omnitel, the first private mobile network operator in Italy. Caio was appointed CEO of Omnitel and from 1994 to 1996 led the creation of the company, the design and construction of its infrastructure, the developments of its national retail network and the launch of the service.

In September 1996, Merloni's owner Vittorio Merloni called Francesco Caio to take the position of CEO and Managing Director of the company, aiming at improving financial performance and brand's presence in international markets. Caio became the first Merloni's Managing Director arrived from another company.

In 2003, Francesco Caio was appointed Chief Executive of Cable and Wireless Communications PLC until his abrupt departure in 2006 following a period of disappointing performance by the company.

In March 2011, Francesco Caio became a member of the Board of Directors of Avio, and on May 2 he took over as Chief Executive Officer of the group. Avio Aero, a GE Aviation business, is a leading player in the design, manufacture and maintenance of civil and military aeronautics components and systems. Around the world, the company has approximately 4,700 employees (around 4,000 in Italy) and has plants also in Poland, Brazil and China. From 2010 to 2012, company earnings increased from 1.7 to 2.3 billion euro, and EBITDA (Company's Earnings before interest, taxes, depreciation, and amortization) grow from 340 to 430 million. In December 2012, the aeronautical department of Avio S.p.A. was acquired by General Electric for 3.3 billion euro.

In April 2014 he was appointed CEO of Poste Italiane. In October 2015, Caio led Poste Italiane to the IPO (initial public offering). The offer, the first large sale of shares in government-owned companies in 16 years in Italy, generated around €3.5 billion and was the largest European IPO in 2015. During his tenure at Poste he led a thorough transformation programme by focussing Poste in three areas : logistics - to serve rapidly growing demand for parcels / e-commerce; transaction banking and digital payments; asset mgmt and insurance. From a 2014 to 2016 net profit tripled and total assets under management grew to 495 Billion Euro.

Francesco Caio has also been a member of the boards of directors of multinational groups including Equant (1997-2000), Motorola in the United States (2000-2003), Invensys in the UK (2009 - 2011) and member of the advisory board of Polytechnic University of Milan. He has been an industrial policy consultant to the UK and Italian governments in the area of broadband network infrastructure development. In June 2013 he was appointed as Commissioner for the Italian Government's Digital Agenda by Prime Minister Enrico Letta.

In May 2017 he was appointed Advisor to the Italian Prime Minister for Industrial policy.

In 2018 Caio became Chairman of Saipem, an oil and gas services company.

On 29 June 2020, Italian Prime Minister Giuseppe Conte announced that Francesco Caio was named Chairman and Fabio Lazzerini was named CEO of the new Alitalia airline.

== Publications ==
Lo stato del digitale. Come l'Italia può recuperare la leadership in Europa, Marsilio, 2014.
