= Poste Italiane =

Italian postal service provider

Poste Italiane S.p.A.

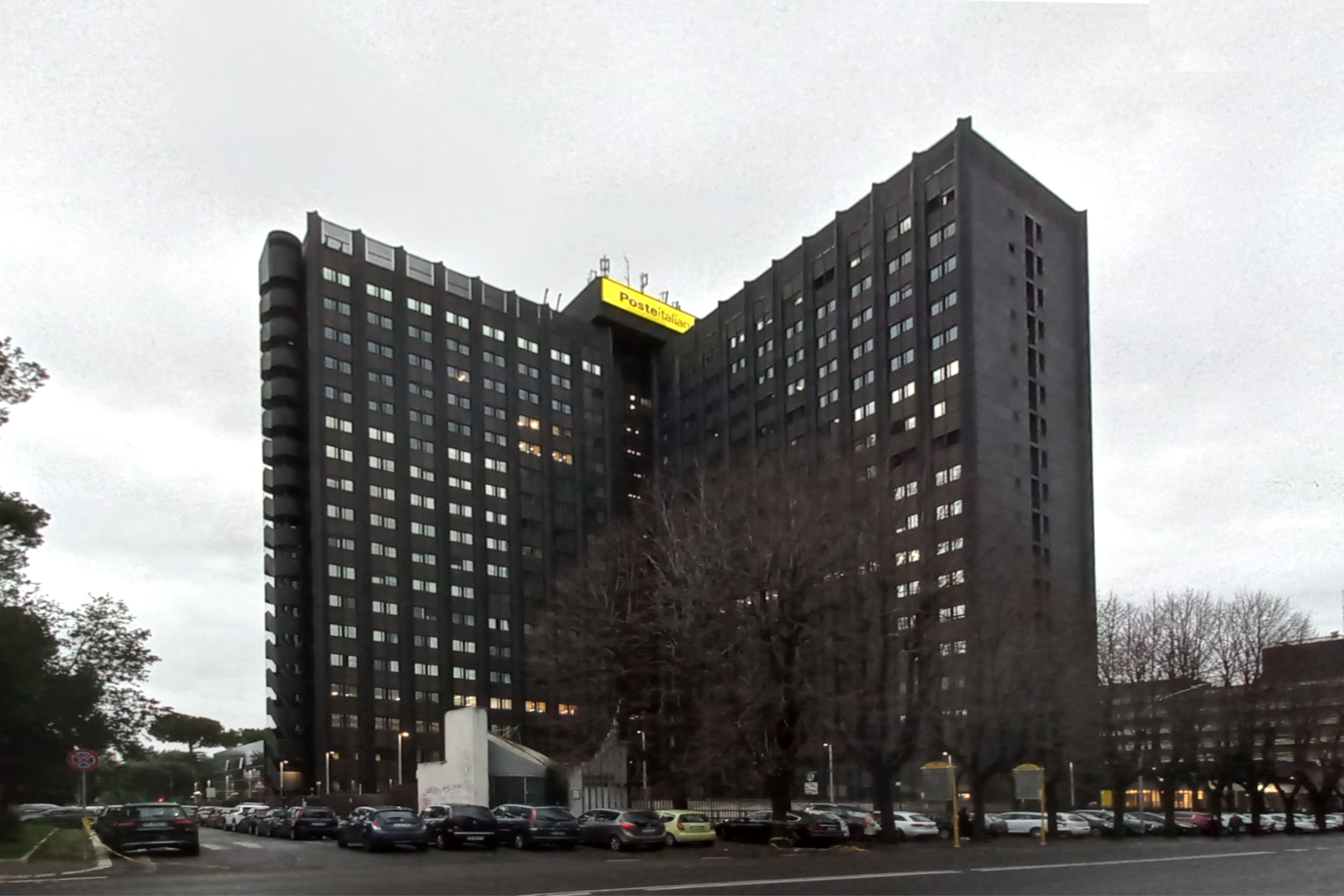
- Poste Italiane headquarters in Rome
- Formerly: Regie Poste
- Type: Public
- Traded as: BIT: PST; FTSE MIB Component
- ISIN: ISIN: IT0003796171
- Industry: Postal services; Financial services
- Founded: 5 May 1862; 164 years ago
- Headquarters: 190 viale Europa, Rome, Italy
- Area served: Italy
- Key people: Matteo Del Fante (CEO); Silvia Rovere (Chairwoman)
- Services: Postal services; Financial services; Insurance services; Payments; Telephony
- Revenue: €12 billion (2023)
- Net income: €1.9 billion (2023)
- Owner: Cassa Depositi e Prestiti (35%); Ministry of Economy and Finance (29.26%)
- Number of employees: 120,155 (2023)
- Subsidiaries: BancoPosta; Postamat; Poste Air Cargo; PosteMobile; Postepay; Poste Vita; SDA Express Courier
- Capital ratio: 22.1% (CET1, BancoPosta division only); 307% Insurance Group’s Solvency; The Group confirmed its capital solidity during 2023. In 2022 the same indicators were at 23.1% and 253% respectively.
- Website: posteitaliane.it
- Footnotes; In consolidated balance sheet excluding minority interests

Poste Italiane (Italian pronunciation: [ˈpɔste itaˈljaːne], lit. 'Italian Post', abbr. PT (Note: The "PT" abbreviation stood for Poste e Telegrafi (Post and Telegraph) and later Poste e Telecomunicazioni (Post and Telecommunications).)) is the Italian postal service provider. Besides providing postal services, Poste Italiane offers communications, postal savings products, logistics, and financial and insurance services throughout Italy.

== History ==
=== 1862–1990 ===
Law no. 604 of 5 May 1862 (the so-called Postal reform) created a national and centralised organisation for postal service by introducing a general fee to pay for services, including postal stamps, throughout the entire territory of the newly formed kingdom of Italy. Subsequently, with Royal Decree 5973 of 10 March 1889, the Directorate General of Posts and Telegraphs was separated from the Ministry of Public Works and thus turned into the Ministry of Posts and Telegraphs. It was commissioned to create a network of offices in Italy to forward and receive mail and telegrams, make and receive telephone calls, carry out financial transactions, and manage assets. It also worked as a branch office for the nascent electric services for a time.

The giro service (commonly known as BancoPosta since 2000) was founded in 1917. In 1924, during the Fascist period, the Ministry of Posts and Telegraphs was renamed the Ministry of Communications, becoming an important centre of power. The services network was expanded with the acquisition and implementation of new logistics facilities. New buildings in the Functionalist style were built in major cities. With the development of telephony and radio communications, the Ministry incorporated the State Company for Telephone Services (ASST) and the nascent EIAR (which would later become RAI and run both public radio and television).

=== 1990–2000 ===
In the early 1990s, the Italian public administration and postal service were deemed irrecoverable in terms of efficiency and profitability. The budget deficit increased personnel costs, which in 1986 absorbed about 93% (including 16% for pensions) of the current revenue. From 1970 to 1985 employees' productivity was reduced by 24% at the expense of the quality of services provided, generating an ever more critical deficit situation.

In 1994, the regular average of delivered daily mail after dispatch was less than 20% in Italy, compared to almost 80% in Germany. In 1989, the average time for mail delivery was 8.5 days. An attempt was made to contain the obvious gap in the quality of Italian postal service compared to the rest of Europe, with Decree-Law no. 487 of 1 December 1993, converted by law no. 71 of 29 January 1994. This led to the transformation of the Italian Post Office from an independent company into a public business, with the additional step to joint-stock company being taken in 1996 (implemented after 28 February 1998).

The transformation process required the management of the Italian postal services to adopt the production efficiency principle, recover the quality of services, and bring about economic and financial recovery. There was a gradual reduction of the 4,500 billion lira deficit (as of 1993) through specific policies to reduce production costs (80% due to staff costs), by increasing revenues from the sale of services to the PA, and by reordering the tariff system, leading Poste Italiane to record a net profit by 2001.

In February 1998, the Ministry of the Treasury (The Prodi I Cabinet) appointed Corrado Passera as the CEO of the newly formed joint-stock company Poste Italiane. The business plan implemented by Corrado Passera from 1998 to 2002 reduced staff by 22,000. According to trade union leaders, there was a casualization of contracts for new recruits, cases of widespread harassment, and resignation because of workload due to the excessive staff cuts.

The Solidarity Fund was used for saving on labour costs as well as lowering the average age of the staff. The last two years of missing contributions from employees taking early retirement were paid for by a deduction in payroll for the new employees for 10 years. The company offsets these losses by replacing them by recruiting many young workers under the age of 24 and giving them three-year apprenticeship contracts.

=== 2000–2010 ===
In 2000, the Italian Post Office, through its subsidiary SDA Express Courier, acquired 20% of the share capital of the Bartolini company and officially formed the Consortium Logistics and Parcels with the three companies for the sorting of parcels in the country. This agreement was the subject of a challenge by the rival companies in court, but it ended in favour of the Consortium. Poste Italiane adopted a control system for monitoring in real-time all the post offices, the logistics network and the security of digital communications and transactions working with the Italian government, international agencies, universities and research centres.

=== 2010–2015 ===
In 2011, Poste Italiane acquired UniCredit MedioCredito Centrale for €136 million. On 16 May 2014, the Italian government approved the stakes sale of up to 40 per cent in Poste Italiane. In 2015, under CEO Francesco Caio, Poste Italiane closed 455 offices in 2015 due to low profit. Current CEO Matteo Del Fante stated in November 2018 that the company's intention is to preserve post offices and take specific measures for smaller Italian cities.^{[4]}

The Ministry of Economy and Finance, which now owns 64.696% of Poste Italiane, sold about 35% of shares on Borsa Italiana. On 25 May 2016, a further 35% stake was transferred from the ministry to Cassa Depositi e Prestiti (CDP), making it the minority shareholder of the national investment bank. This has given it equity in stakes for Poste Italiane but has also diluted its voting rights in CDP.

=== 2015–present ===
From the date of listing on the stock exchange (27 October 2015) to 31 December 2021, Poste Italiane's share price increased by 71% (while the FTSE MIB index decreased by 20.8%), which helped in an overall return for shareholders (TSR) of +137% while the main Italian stock exchange index recorded a loss of 47%. An annual report from 2021 recorded Poste Italiane's turnover as over €11.2 billion, an EBIT of €1.8 billion, a net profit of €1.6 billion and a CAPEX of €754 million (Data source: Annual Report 2021).

During the COVID-19 pandemic in Italy, Poste Italiane was able to guarantee operational continuity and extensive cooperation with national institutions to support the logistical activities of the Italian National Protection Service. In 2025, Poste Italiane agreed to acquire a 15% stake in Telecom Italia from Vivendi, making it TIM's largest shareholder with a total 24.8% stake. This €684 million ($741 million) deal, priced at €0.2975 per share (a 4.8% discount from the previous close), allows Poste to stay just below the 25% threshold that would legally require a full takeover offer. Poste had first entered TIM in February with a 9.8% stake, replacing the state lender CDP, and this expanded role aligns with government efforts to maintain national influence over the strategically important former phone monopoly.

== Activities ==
With a network of about 12,800 post offices, 120,155 employees and 45 million customers, Poste Italiane is the largest service distribution network in Italy.The company operates in the fields of logistics, mail and parcel delivery, financial and insurance services, payment systems and telephony, with activities divided into four different business areas.

=== Mail, parcel and distribution ===
Being the first postal operator in Italy, the Group provides mail and parcel delivery services using its own multi-channel distribution platform. Additionally, they are engaged in hybrid mail management, a service that converts digital documents into physical form and delivers them to recipients, ensuring the integrity and certification of digital communications and operations. Since 2018, the Joint Delivery model has been implemented, allowing more flexible parcel and e-commerce shipment delivery tailored to specific characteristics of the area, such as population density and mail volumes. The model also includes some investments in cutting-edge distribution and automation technologies.

=== Financial services ===
Poste Italiane is one of the primary financial services operators in the country through its asset allocation BancoPosta. The structure is responsible for actively managing the portfolio of liquidity gathered from both private and public customers. It also handles the collection and management of postal savings, which are issued by Cassa Depositi e Prestiti in the form of interest-bearing bonds and passbooks. Furthermore, the Group provides collection and payment services, including postal bulletins, F24, national and international postal money orders, Moneygram, and Eurogiro circuit services. Moreover, Poste Italiane is involved in the placement and distribution of financial products issued by third parties or other companies within the Group.

=== Insurance ===
Poste Italiane operates in the insurance sector through Poste Vita, which provides insurance, pension, investment and savings products. Additionally, the company operates in the non-life insurance segment through Poste Assicura, which was established in 2010. Poste Assicura offers various insurance products that cover protection against accidents, civil and general liability, fire, property damage, and pecuniary losses. They also provide legal assistance services.

=== Payments and mobile ===
Finally, Poste Italiane is involved in the realm of e-money and electronic payments. The division also includes the provision of telephone operator services through the PosteMobile service, initiatives related to the digital sector, as well as electricity and gas sales services provided by Poste Energia. The availability of Poste Energia's services commenced in February 2023 and covers the entire country.

== See also ==
- BancoPosta
- Gruppo Assicurativo Poste Vita
- Poste Air Cargo
- PosteMobile
- Poste San Marino
- Postepay
