= Pierfrancesco Majorino =

Italian politician (born 1973)

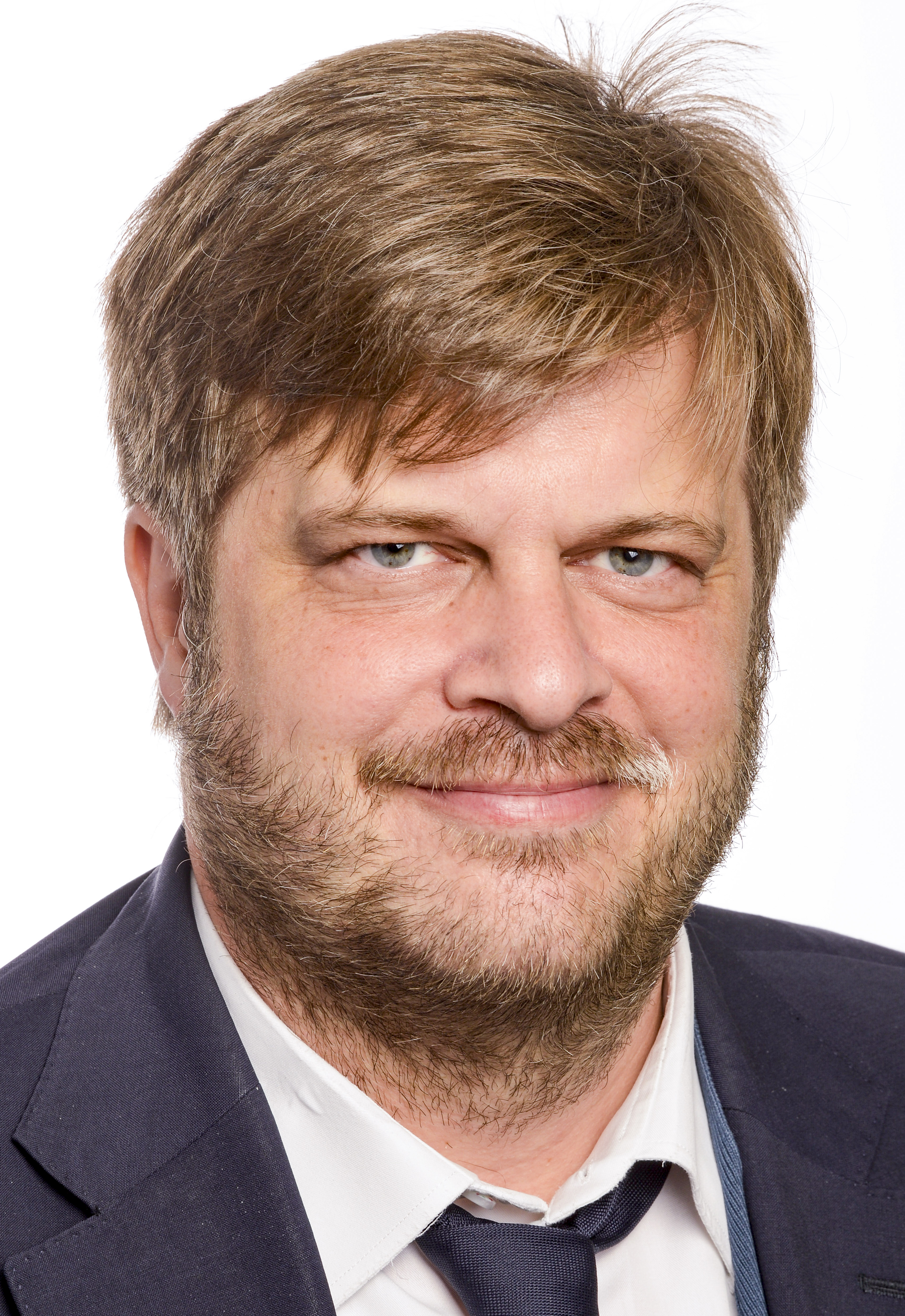

Member of the Regional Council of Lombardy
- Incumbent
- Assumed office 5 April 2023

Member of the European Parliament
- In office 2 July 2019 – 4 April 2023
- Succeeded by: Mercedes Bresso
- Constituency: North-West Italy

Personal details
- Born: 14 May 1973 (age 53) Milan, Italy
- Party: PD (since 2007)
- Other political affiliations: PCI (1987–1991); PDS (1991–1998); DS (1998–2007); S&D (2019–2023)
- Education: Sapienza University (dropped out)
- Occupation: Politician, writer

Pierfrancesco Majorino (born 14 May 1973) is an Italian politician who is a member of the Regional Council of Lombardy since 2023. Previously, he was a member of the European Parliament (MEP) from 2019 to 2023. Born in Milan, he was politically active in his teens and grew up in the youth wing of the Italian Communist Party (PCI). He followed up by joining the PCI's legal successor, first the Democratic Party of the Left (PDS) and then the Democrats of the Left (DS), and was among the founders of the Milanese section of the Democratic Party (PD).

Majorino served as Assessor for Social Policies of Milan during former deputy Giuliano Pisapia's term as mayor from 2011 to 2016, as well as during the first mayoral term of the former Expo 2015 government commissioner Giuseppe Sala from 2016 to 2019. During his eight years as an assessor, he designed poverty reduction initiatives, migrant reception schemes, and significantly increased municipal funding for disability services and support for female victims of violence. He became particularly well known for his efforts in providing assistance to refugees and expanding the protection of LGBTQ+ rights. He resigned from this position as a result of his election as an MEP in 2019.

In the 2019 European Parliament election, Majorino was elected as an MEP on the electoral list of the PD. On the European Parliament, he served on the Committee on Development. In 2020, he also joined the Special Committee on Foreign Interference in all Democratic Processes in the European Union (EU). In addition to his committee assignments, Majorino was part of the European Parliament's delegations to the EU–Turkey Joint Parliamentary Committee and to the Parliamentary Assembly of the Union for the Mediterranean. He was also a member of several European Parliament intergroups, including those on Anti-Racism and Diversity, Fighting against Poverty, Trade Unions, and the URBAN Intergroup.

Majorino resigned as an MEP to run in the 2023 Lombard regional election, where he was the unsuccessful centre-left coalition candidate for president of Lombardy. Subsequently, he led the opposition to Attilio Fontana as a member of the Regional Council of Lombardy, joined the PD Secretariat under deputy Elly Schlein, and is considered among the leading candidates for mayor of Milan. He is also a writer and the author of several novels and essays.

== Early life ==
=== Family and education ===
Born on 14 May 1973 in Milan, Majorino is the son of an anti-fascist and psychoanalyst father (who died in 2025) and a mother employed by the local government. His mother is from Bolzano and his great-grandfather hailed from Naples. He is also the nephew of Giancarlo Majorino, a Milanese poet who was the founder of the House of Poetry in the Liberty building, and who was described as even more left-wing than his father.

Before moving to the Corso Lodi area with his family during his youth, Majorino was born and raised in Via Archimede, and into the Porta Romana neighbourhood. Majorino later described writing as "an obsession of mine", and recalled that when he was eight, he used to "craft poems for the girls I liked". He attended the specialised state technical college (istituto tecnico statale a ordinamento speciale, ITSOS) named after Albe Steiner. He completed his studies, qualifying as an IT technician after obtaining a diploma in Computer Science. Subsequently, Majorino moved to Rome to study sociology at the Sapienza University, although he did not complete his degree. He later expressed regret over this decision, publicly stating that he had unwisely prioritised his political and trade union activism over his university education.

=== Student movement and activism ===
Majorino began his political career within the student movement, joining the Italian Communist Youth Federation (FGCI) – the youth wing of the PCI – at the age of 14, during his final year of middle school. He subsequently supported the Bolognina turning point promoted by Achille Occhetto, which led to the dissolution of the PCI and the creation of the PDS. During his time at the ITSOS high school, Majorino frequently faced political hostility from far-left student groups (Autonomi), who viewed members of the official PCI youth wing as overly moderate. Despite winning several student body elections, he regularly experienced physical confrontations from these dissident factions. Also in 1991, during his penultimate year of high school and shortly after turning 18, he was elected to the Zone 3 local council. Between 1993 and 1994, he was among the founders of the Unione degli Studenti (UdS) and Rete Studentesca (RS), serving as its national president from 1994 to 1998.

During the Mani pulite anti-corruption investigations led by Antonio Di Pietro and other magistrates in the early 1990s, Majorino, then a young student movement representative, openly supported the Italian judiciary. He organised demonstrations outside the Milan Palace of Justice, including events held in honour of Giovanni Falcone. On 15 June 1992, during an appearance as an audience guest on the television programme Milano, Italia hosted by Gad Lerner, he publicly stated: "We said yes to Antonio Di Pietro, no to the old politics!" In 2010, Majorino defended former Milan chief prosecutor Francesco Saverio Borrelli when the latter was removed from his position as president of the Milan Conservatory by order of the then Minister of Education Mariastella Gelmini. Later in 2012, while serving as Milan's Assessor for Social Policies, he established the Festival of Confiscated Goods from the Mafia, an initiative aimed at promoting the social reuse of seized properties and raising public awareness through conferences and exhibitions. In 2017, when Sala proposed naming a street after Bettino Craxi, Majorino strongly opposed the idea, stating: "I will not change my mind. To me, Craxi is a negative example. There is no need for a street!"

== Political career ==
=== Department for Social Solidarity and councillor of Milan ===
In 1998, the 25-year-old Majorino, who had dropped from university, followed Massimo D'Alema's transition from the PDS to the DS, as well as the birth of The Olive Tree. He joined the board of the Department for Social Solidarity within the Presidency of the Council of Ministers, which was led at the time by the Minister of Social Solidarity and his party colleague Livia Turco. While working at the department, Majorino focused on youth politics and the fight against substance dependence. In this role, he also represented the Department for Social Affairs of the Italian Prime Minister's Office in Albania on the occasion of international meetings for the promotion and evaluation of projects linked to youth creativity and support for vulnerable minors.

Between 2000 and 2003, Majorino served as the coordinator of the Milanese section of the DS, and subsequently as its provincial secretary from 2003 until 2007. In 2001, at the age of 28, Majorino was appointed as the head of organisation for the Milan metropolitan federation of the DS. He was selected for the role by Federico Ottolenghi, who was serving as the federation's provincial secretary at the time. In 2004, Majorino was elected secretary of the DS federation in Milan, a position he held until 2007, under the leadership of Filippo Penati and Franco Mirabelli. During the 2006 Italian local elections on 28–29 May, he ran for the Milan City Council on The Olive Tree list, which included the DS, supporting The Union's mayoral candidate Bruno Ferrante. He was elected as a city councillor, serving in opposition to Letizia Moratti's municipal administration. In 2007, following the dissolution of the DS approved at that year's party congress, he joined the PD, contributing to the foundation of its Milanese branch, and became its floor leader (capogruppo) in the city council in 2008, a position he held until 2011.

During Moratti's term of office, Majorino was among the proponents of establishing the Anti-Mafia Commission, the Civil Union Register for de facto couples, the increase in social housing within the Territory Government Plan, and the creation of the anti-crisis fund as a measure against job insecurity and poverty. During five years of intense political opposition, Majorino demonstrated a highly determined approach. Known for his effective use of the media, his messaging was frequently described as bold and uncompromising. On some occasions, his confrontational style drew criticism; for instance, following a local flood, he held up a banner stating "The real natural disaster for Milan: Mayor Moratti". He frequently criticised the Moratti administration's financial management, later citing in 2015 its budgetary deficits as an ongoing challenge for the municipality. Following the legal investigations involving Penati, Majorino retained his position as the PD floor leader at Palazzo Marino (Milan's city hall). During the scandal, he adopted a staunchly confrontational anti-corruption stance (or justicialist according to his critics) against Penati, although he later privately apologised for the severity of his public attacks.

=== Assessor for Social Policies of Milan ===
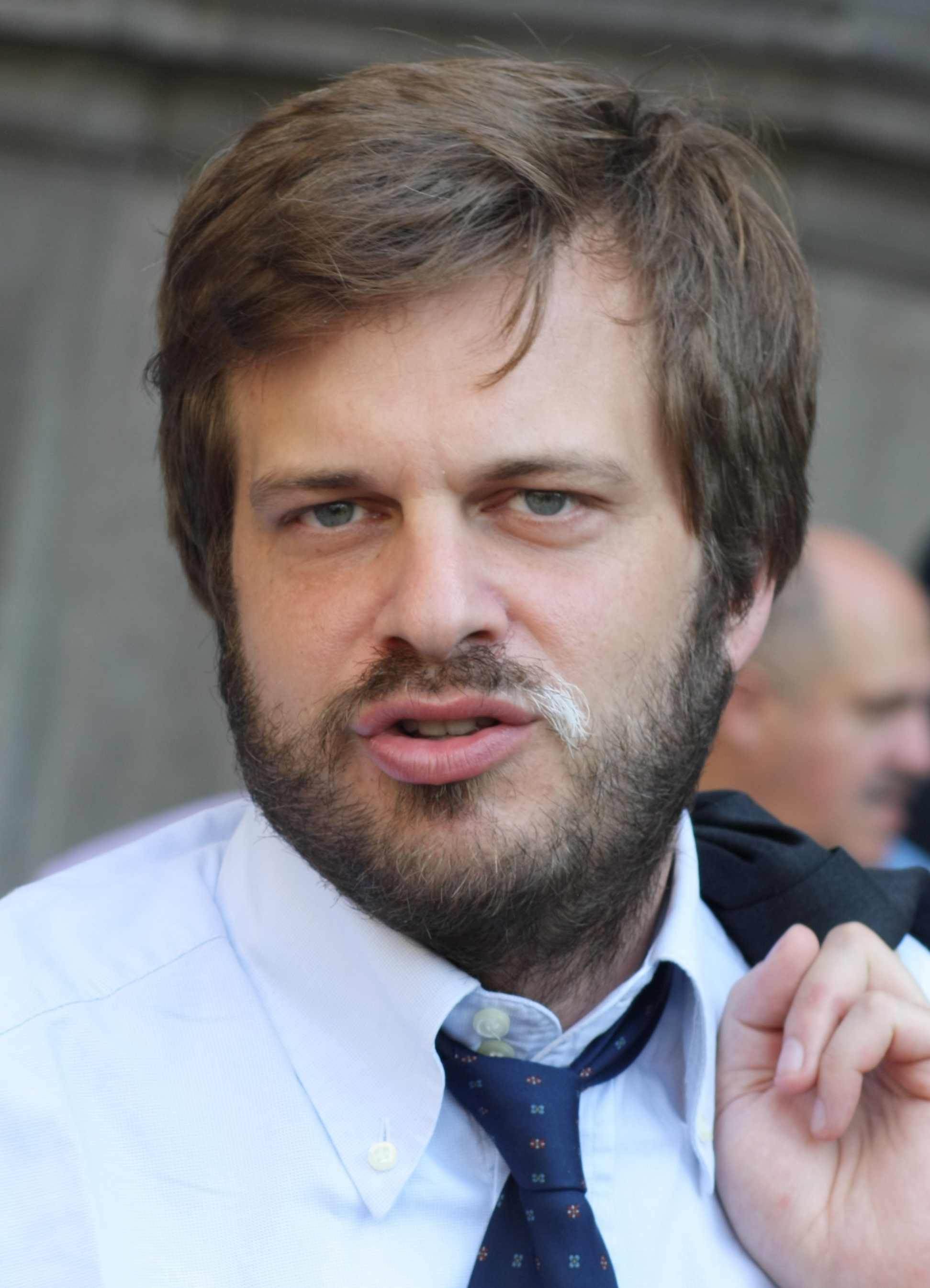
Majorino in 2012

During the 2011 Italian local elections on 15–16 May, with a second round on 29–30 May, Majorino was re-elected to Milan's city council on the PD list, backing Pisapia. Pisapia was subsequently elected mayor of Milan, returning the city to a centre-left administration after 18 years. This sparked a shift to the left, initiating a streak in which the centre-left coalition won every election in Milan from 2011 onwards. Upon taking office as mayor, Pisapia appointed the then 31-year-old Majorino as Assessor for Social Policies. In this role, he focused extensively on projects outside Milan's historic centre, strongly rejecting the criticisms that the centre-left administration had neglected the city's outer suburbs.

As the lead candidate for the PD, Majorino was re-elected to the city council in 2016, with 7,514 preference votes. Sala, who eventually won the mayoral race, re-appointed him as Assessor for Social Policies. He had been reportedly discussed as a likely deputy mayor to Sala, who ultimately appointed Anna Scavuzzo. Following his reappointment to the municipal executive, political commentators noted that Majorino had emerged as one of the key political figures within the local administration. Along with fellow assessor Pierfrancesco Maran, he was widely regarded by insiders as one of the few authentic political strategists remaining in Milan's centre-left leadership, especially after the third prominent local figure of the same name, Pierfrancesco Barletta, had transitioned into a corporate management career. During this time, he was also seen as close to Andrea Orlando, compared to Maran, who was part of the Renziani majority.

During his tenure as Assessor for Social Policies, which lasted from 2011 to 2019, Majorino contributed to producing the first and second welfare development plans, and also coordinated the implementation of the municipal administration's Children's Plan. Majorino focused on tackling poverty, creating the Social Redemption Pact, which was a form of municipal income support in force during the years preceding the introduction of the Inclusion Income (REI) at a national level. Moreover, he led the expansion of services for disabled people and vulnerable elderly citizens, developing new ways to access home care services, such as through the WEMI system. He was also responsible for promoting a culture of health and prevention, as well as civil rights, the temporary social housing system (the first of its kind in Italy), new interventions for the homeless that more than doubled the number of beds in the city, and worked to protect civil rights by establishing the Registry of Civil Unions, the Registry of Advance Healthcare Directives, and the House of Rights, which served to support people against all forms of discrimination, gender-based violence, and human trafficking.

During the Pisapia and Sala administrations, starting from 18 October 2013, Majorino coordinated the migrant reception operations, which provided temporary accommodation for 128,000 people, including over 25,000 children and young people. He also devised ways to involve the city and encourage its participation in the social life of the local and metropolitan community, such as the Welfare Forum, which reached its eighth edition, and the Festival of Confiscated Goods from the Mafia, which reached its seventh edition. Throughout his administrative career, he actively collaborated with national and international networks of cities and metropolitan areas, such as Solidarity Cities and Eurocities, which led to Milan hosting the 8th Integrating Cities Conference in November 2018. He also represented the city of Milan at the Global Mayors Summit in New York (September 2017), a meeting that resulted in the signing of a joint city declaration on the Global Compact for Migration and the Global Compact on Refugees. Among the various accolades received by the city under Majorino and with Pisapia as mayor, Milan won the first European prize for disabled-friendly cities, the Access City Award, in 2016. In 2019, he was the main organiser of the "People – prima le persone" march, which brought around 200,000 protestors onto the streets. As a result of his pro-migrant positions and policies, he was a victim of right-wing populist attacks. For example, the daily newspaper Libero celebrated his resignation with the headline "Hooray, the pro-migrant councillor is leaving Milan".

=== 2016 centre-left primaries for mayor of Milan ===
In July 2015, Majorino announced that he would take part to the centre-left coalition primary elections. The announcement came at the Teatro Litta, the same venue chosen by Pisapia to launch his own campaign in 2010. Political observers noted that the choice of location symbolised Majorino's desire to present his platform in continuity with the outgoing administration. During the primaries, his candidacy was backed by numerous social-welfare organisations, fellow Milanese assessor Filippo Del Corno, and elements of both the left wing of the PD and Left Ecology Freedom (SEL). The son of divorced parents, Majorino spoke openly about his own experience as a single father, rejecting idealised depictions of family life. Throughout his career, his political platform has been heavily defined by advocacy for secularism, anti-fascism, and anti-racism. As an administrator, he implemented these principles by establishing Milan's civil unions register for same-sex couples and campaigning for official recognition of the city's anti-fascist heritage.

When questioned during the primaries campaign about his long-term vision for Milan, Majorino summarised his political platform by stating that he aimed to make the city "beautiful, gentle, and welcoming to everyone". His prominent profile within the local left-wing movement led commentators to anticipate potential public debates with right-wing political figures such as Matteo Salvini. Majorino was characterised as highly accessible and deeply committed to marginalized groups. His literary editor Gabriele Dadati noted that Majorino's social advocacy is reflected in his novels, which are consistently set in Milan's council estates. Conversely, some critics like the writer Gianluigi Ricuperati argued that while Majorino is a dedicated local administrator, his platform lacked the broader international vision necessary for Milan. Ricuperati suggested the city required a leadership capable of positioning it globally, drawing comparisons to Barcelona's transformation in the 1990s.

Ahead of the 2016 Italian local elections on 5 June, with a second round on 19 June, Majorino ran in the centre-left coalition primaries to select the mayoral candidate for Milan, which were triggered by the outgoing mayor Pisapia's decision not to seek a second term. Notably, he expressed his desire to see "a car-free Milan by 2030". In the primaries held on 7 February, he finished third, behind the outgoing deputy mayor Francesca Balzani and Sala.

=== European Parliament ===
==== Election ====
In the 2019 PD leadership election on 3 March, Majorino supported the motion of Nicola Zingaretti, the candidate with the longest administrative career and the then president of Lazio. Majorino had been an early supporter of Zingaretti. After winning 44% of the votes among party members, Zingaretti ultimately won the PD leadership with 66% of the vote on a 1.6 million turnout, and Majorino subsequently joined the party's national directorate. Also in 2019, he resigned as Assessor for Social Policy to run for the European Parliament. In the 2019 European Parliament election in Italy on 26 May, Majorino ran as a candidate for the European Parliament on the Democratic Party – We Are Europeans list in the North-West Italy constituency. Majorino was elected as an MEP, receiving 93,175 preference votes (the third highest number in the constituency), and subsequently announced his resignation as an assessor at the end of June, ending his term on 18 July.

Within the European Parliament, Majorino represented the Progressive Alliance of Socialists and Democrats (S&D) group from 2 July 2019 to 4 April 2023. He served on the Committee on Development from 2 July 2019 to 19 January 2022, and again from 20 to 25 January 2022, before serving as its vice-chair from 26 January 2022 to 4 April 2023. Within the Committee on Employment and Social Affairs, he focused on labour issues and the protection of workers' rights as a substitute member from 2 July 2019 to 19 January 2022 and from 20 January 2022 to 4 April 2023. He was also a substitute member of the Subcommittee on Security and Defence under the Committee on Foreign Affairs from 2 July 2019 to 19 January 2022 and from 20 January 2022 to 4 April 2023. He served as a substitute member for the Committee on Foreign Affairs itself across three separate intervals: from 2 July 2019 to 19 January 2022, from 20 January 2022 to 14 February 2023, and from 27 February 2023 to 4 April 2023.

==== Tenure ====
Majorino spent extensive intervals handling foreign affairs and security policy. He was a substitute member of the Committee on Foreign Affairs across three separate intervals: from 2 July 2019 to 19 January 2022, from 20 January 2022 to 14 February 2023, and from 27 February 2023 to 4 April 2023. Parallel to these terms, he served as a substitute member of the Subcommittee on Security and Defence from 2 July 2019 to 19 January 2022, and from 20 January 2022 to 4 April 2023. He also joined the Subcommittee on Human Rights as a substitute member from 20 January 2022 to 4 April 2023. His parliamentary delegation roles included serving as a full member of the Delegation to the EU–Turkey Joint Parliamentary Committee and the Delegation to the Parliamentary Assembly for the Union for the Mediterranean from 2 July 2019 to 4 April 2023. During this same timeframe, he participated as a substitute member in the Delegation for relations with Palestine. Moreover, Majorino served as a full member of the Delegation to the EU–Turkey Joint Parliamentary Committee from 2 July 2019 to 4 April 2023, and during the same period he participated as a substitute member in the Delegation for relations with Palestine and as a full member in the Delegation to the Parliamentary Assembly for the Union for the Mediterranean. From 20 January 2022 to 4 April 2023, he was part of the Subcommittee on Human Rights as a substitute member, and served as co-chair of the Intergroup on Extreme Poverty and Human Rights.

On behalf of the S&D, Majorino coordinated the Special Committee on Foreign Interference in all Democratic Processes in the European Union, including Disinformation (INGE) from 14 September 2020 to 23 March 2022, which was established to monitor potential foreign interference in the political processes of EU member states. From 24 March 2022 to 4 April 2023, he continued this mandate as a full member of its successor, the Special Committee on foreign interference in all democratic processes in the European Union, including disinformation, and the strengthening of integrity, transparency and accountability in the European Parliament (ING2). Additionally, between 24 March 2022 and 4 April 2023, he acted as a substitute member of the Special Committee on the COVID-19 pandemic: lessons learned and recommendations for the future. Throughout the Ninth European Parliament, Majorino was also an active member of several informal European Parliament intergroups. From 2019 to 2023, he was a registered member of the Anti-Racism and Diversity Intergroup (ARDI), the Trade Unions Intergroup, and the URBAN Intergroup. Additionally, he focused on social inclusion within the Intergroup on Fighting against Poverty, serving as its co-chair from 2020 to 2022, before transitioning to co-chair the Intergroup on Extreme Poverty and Human Rights between 2022 and 2023. All of his intergroup mandates concluded upon the end of his European tenure on 4 April 2023.

During his tenure in the European Parliament, Majorino contributed to various legislative areas, particularly focusing on corporate accountability, social justice, and human rights. In plenary sessions, his notable contributions to debates included addresses on the Corporate Sustainability Reporting Directive, the International Day for the Eradication of Poverty, and a topical debate concerning the whitewashing of the far-right within the EU. As a rapporteur for the Committee on Development (DEVE), Majorino drafted two significant opinions regarding corporate transparency and accountability. In March 2022, he authored the committee's opinion amending Directive 2013/34/EU with respect to corporate sustainability reporting. This was followed in February 2023 by an opinion on the proposed directive for Corporate Sustainability Due Diligence. Additionally, he acted as a shadow rapporteur on a 2020 report aimed at improving development effectiveness and aid efficiency, as well as on several committee opinions, including regulations on generalised tariff preferences, the protection of the environment through criminal law, and the implementation of the New European Agenda for Culture.

Majorino was active in tabling resolutions and raising parliamentary questions. Following corruption allegations involving external influence, he co-tabled a joint motion for a resolution in December 2022 addressing suspicions of corruption from Qatar (Qatargate) and advocating for enhanced transparency and accountability within EU institutions. His other legislative motions included a joint resolution on human rights in Egypt. Through oral and written questions, Majorino addressed the European Commission and the European Council on various social and humanitarian crises; these included inquiries regarding inclusive employment for people with autism, the closure of a manufacturing plant in Mozzate, Italy, renewable energy support for Ukraine, and the humanitarian situation of Turkish and Syrian children orphaned by the 2023 Turkey–Syria earthquakes.

=== 2023 Lombard regional election ===
In November 2022, it was announced that Majorino would as a candidate for the presidency of the Lombardy region. He was backed by a centre-left coalition composed of Democratic Party – Democratic and Progressive Lombardy (PD, Article One, and the Italian Socialist Party), the Five Star Movement, Civic Pact – Majorino President (Italian Radicals, Possibile, Volt Italia, Monica Frassoni's AVEC, and Civic European Lombards), and the Greens and Left Alliance.

Majorino's candidacy was well received within the Italian centre-left and was praised as "a capable, honest, and well-prepared progressive". In particular, Italian Left welcomed his candidacy and described Majorino as "a figure who is distinctly different in terms of history, positions, and credibility from those of Attilio Fontana and Letizia Moratti on the centre-right", while More Europe expressed "support for the candidate put forward by the PD" but also said that "our participation concerns a coalition which, as it stands today, does not include the Five Star Movement." Majorino consistently opposed the Salvini decrees on security. Moreover, he is a critic of the Bossi–Fini immigration law, and also strongly criticised the Italy–Libya memorandum, which he described as inhumane, despite it being a policy of his own party under Interior Minister Marco Minniti and with the endorsement of then Prime Minister Paolo Gentiloni, and was thus seen as a candidacy bucking the party establishment and its shift to the right. During his campaign, he announced that if he were elected, his team would include former Mani pulite magistrate Gherardo Colombo to lead initiatives focused on transparency, legality, and anti-corruption.

In the election, held on 12–13 February, Majorino obtained 33.93% of the vote and was defeated by Fontana, the incumbent and popular president of Lombardy in a regional stronghold for the centre-right coalition, who won re-election with 54.67% of the vote, although he managed to achieve a better result than Giorgio Gori in the 2018 Lombard regional election, despite competition from Moratti (a former mayor of Milan and Vice President and Assessor of Welfare of Lombardy) as the candidate of the Third Pole who won 9.87% of the vote. He was nevertheless elected to the Regional Council of Lombardy as the runner-up candidate, subsequently resigning as an MEP to lead the opposition against the centre-right coalition administration. In doing so, Majorino became a member of the Finance, Budget and Subsidiaries Committee, the Culture, Research, Innovation, Sport and Communications Committee, and the Special Anti-Mafia, Anti-Corruption, Transparency and Legality Education Committee. He was unanimously elected floor leader of the PD in the Regional Council of Lombardy.

=== Democratic Party Secretariat under Elly Schlein ===
In the 2023 PD leadership election on 26 February, Majorino supported the motion of Schlein, a deputy and former vice-president of Emilia-Romagna, who won with 53.75% of the vote against the then Emilia-Romagna president Stefano Bonaccini. In December 2022, he expressed his support for Schlein. Majorino reiterated his support during a campaign event in January 2023, sharing a commitment to rights for everyone, such as egalitarian marriage and jus soli, and on 21 February, when he publicly announced his intention to vote for Schlein, whom he said represented both change and unity. Upon Schlein's upset win in February 2023, Majorino described her victory in Milan as a signal for the Italian centre-left and the overall results as "beyond all expectations".

In April 2023, Majorino officially joined the PD Secretariat under Schlein's leadership, where he is responsible for housing policy and immigration. Politically seen as belongining on the left wing of the PD, with a 30-plus-year career within the Milanese left, he has been described as "the face of Milanese welfare" during the 2010s, as well as "a long-standing politician, accustomed to the provocations typical of debates between opponents at various levels of politics". In June 2026, Majorino praised Schlein's leadership of the PD, saying that she had revitalised a party that in 2022 was on the brink of dissolution. During his tenure in the PD Secretariat, he and Schlein maintained that their proposals were not radical but—as Schlein had put it in January 2023—were "central to people's lives". Addressing "rising inequalities" and "growing gaps", Majorino argued for the need to find "workable solutions" to effect real change rather than accepting weak compromises that would only reinforce right-wing populist rhetoric.

=== 2027 Milan municipal election ===
Ahead of the 2027 Milan municipal election to replace Sala as the outgoing mayor, Majorino is considered among the frontrunners as the centre-left coalition candidate for mayor of Milan. In December 2025, he cited the newly elected democratic socialist mayor of New York City Zohran Mamdani as a key political benchmark. He argued that to effectively address urban inequalities and the housing crisis, the centre-left coalition in Milan needed to adopt a similarly radical and uncompromising approach to social policies. By 2026, early polls found that he would easily defeat Maurizio Lupi of Us Moderates (NM) as the centre-right coalition candidate. Along with Mario Calabresi, a journalist and son of Luigi Calabresi, Majorino performed the best among various centre-left coalition candidates, with Majorino sharing a poll showing him ahead of Calabresi in the primaries. Besides Calabresi and Majorino, who is awaiting clarification on whether primaries will be held before making his candidacy official, other candidates include deputy mayor Scavuzzo and municipal councillor Lorenzo Pacini.

In July 2026, following statements by Roberto Vannacci—who suggested using the military for round-ups (rastrellamenti) in certain neighbourhoods, such as Rogoredo, and claimed he would return Milan to being "the city of the Madonnina and not of the maranza"—Majorino countered: "I see that the ultra-fascist Vannacci is talking nonsense about Milan and the Milanese centre-left. He should rinse his mouth out with water from the Navigli canals before spouting judgements on things he knows nothing about. We will beat him and his gang once again." Also in July 2026, he called for primaries to select the centre-left coalition candidate. By September 2026, he received the support of MEP Cecilia Strada, and opposed the idea of imposing a candidate from above, calling instead for shared rules and a common programme, without vetoes within the coalition. He also called for a change in the approach of the centre-left administration, particularly on housing and urban planning, arguing that "new priorities and new urgent needs for intervention" have emerged in these areas.

The prospect of a Majorino–Calabresi contest emerged after Calabresi's decision to enter the contest in September 2026, with Schlein calling for the programme to be defined before the candidates and the centre-left coalition divided over whether to use primaries or reach an agreement on a candidate, and Sala echoing her call. Majorino was subsequently reported to be preparing to formally announce his own candidacy for the centre-left coalition primaries, with his supporters viewing Calabresi's move as potentially accelerating the selection process. Calabresi's emergence was seen as a challenge to Majorino's established position within the Milanese PD; unlike Calabresi's largely civic, moderate, and independent profile, he was described as having an established political organisation and support among the party's Milanese base. By October 2026, while Matteo Perego di Cremnago of Forza Italia (FI) emerged as one of the potential candidates for the centre-right coalition along with Lupi and Silvia Sardone of the League (Lega), Majorino was increasingly confident that the centre-left coalition would hold primaries and that he would be one of the candidates.

== Political profile and image ==
Described politically as a left-wing follower of Walter Veltroni, Majorino has cited figures such as former London mayor Ken Livingstone, historic PCI leader Enrico Berlinguer, anti-apartheid icon Nelson Mandela, and civil-rights pioneer Martin Luther King as key political influences. Moreover, he has identified Veltroni as his primary political mentor, noting that the two have maintained a close personal and professional relationship over the years and continue to meet whenever Veltroni visits Milan. His critics, including the centrist liberal Action party leader Carlo Calenda and Il Giornale and Libero journalist Alessandro Sallusti, often characterise his positions as overly left-wing, even as the radical left considers him a political enemy as part of their criticism of the Sala administration. During the 2023 Lombard regional election campaign, Sala noted that while Majorino was an excellent candidate, he would assist him in softening his public image as an overly radical figure.

== Personal life ==
=== Marriage ===
Since September 2016, Majorino is married to Caterina Sarfatti, the daughter of the entrepreneur Riccardo Sarfatti (the centre-left coalition candidate in the 2005 Lombard regional election) and herself a manager of the international network committed to the fight against climate change known as C40 Cities, which is dedicated to supporting cities in implementing climate action and ensuring that urban climate strategies are inclusive and accessible, maximising their scope and beneficial impact. Sarfatti holds a degree in Political Theory and Political Science from the Sciences Po university in Paris, a Master's in Human Rights and Humanitarian Law from Paris-Panthéon-Assas University, and another in Global Environmental Policies from the Tuscia University. As of 2016, they were registered in the civil unions register established by the Pisapia administration at the municipality of Milan. Together, they have two children, one of them being a son from Majorino's former wife Martina, a lawyer.

=== Writings and other activities ===
Majorino collaborates with institutes active in the field of social research and is passionate about writing, having published several novels and reportages, including Dopo i lampi vengono gli abeti (Pequod, 2005), L'eterno giovedì (Dalai, 2007), Togliendo il dolore dagli occhi (Pequod, 2011), and Maledetto amore mio (2014), which is a novel set in Milan's high-rise social housing blocks, as well as the essay Nel labirinto delle paure (2018), which was written with the sociologist Aldo Bonomi. In the late 1990s, Majorino had met and collaborated with Bonomi, who sent him to the Bergamo area to conduct field research and interview small-scale construction entrepreneurs—an experience Majorino later described as highly formative. Following this work, he published in 2000 a reportage on the social conditions of young people in Italy, which was released by AdnKronos Libri.

While some described him as "the last career politician", Majorino tends to view himself primarily as a writer who engages in politics out of passion. As an MEP, Majorino was entitled to a salary ranging between €16,000 and €19,000 per month, with the exact amount varying depending on his attendance at sessions, plus €24,526 per month (previously €21,000) to pay for various personal assistants, who in some cases can number up to ten for a single MEP. According to reports by the daily newspaper Il Giorno, Majorino, who was an assessor in Milan at the time, declared a taxable income of €71,199 in 2018. As of 2019, he is the national vice-president of Italy's WHO Healthy Cities Network.

=== Football and other interests ===
Owing to a family tradition, Majorino is known as a lifelong supporter of Juventus. His support for the Turin-based football club represents a curious exception in the local political landscape of Milan, the city where he lives and works, and which has historically been divided between Juventus's rivals AC Milan and Inter Milan. During his tenure as Assessor for Social Policies, Majorino launched a proposal during the 2016 centre-left coalition mayoral primaries to sell the San Siro stadium to either Milan or Inter. He suggested that the estimated proceeds of €80 million should be entirely reinvested into the city's suburbs; however, his fellow primary candidate Antonio Iannetta criticised the idea, arguing that no buyers would be found. This lack of interest stemmed from both clubs preferring to build modern English-style venues from scratch, similar to the Juventus Stadium (inaugurated in 2011), rather than investing in an outdated facility.

In several public occasions and in humorous personal accounts, such as during Inter's Scudetto celebrations in 2024, Majorino has confirmed and described his "difficulties" in declaring himself a Juventus fan in Milan. On that occasion, he also joked about his wife (a fan of Inter) singing a popular football chant that repeated the club's full name, "And the Internazionale that is there", playfully noting that it was not Vladimir Lenin's International. In addition to football, Majorino is a lover of the mountains and cats, saying that he does not think there is "anything more beautiful than walking in the woods", and he is a fan of cinema and singer-songwriters. His cultural interests include the works of Hungarian writer Ágota Kristóf, particularly The Notebook Trilogy, and traditional Italian singer-songwriters, such as Fabrizio De André and Roberto Vecchioni. He is also a keen enthusiast of the Star Wars film franchise.

=== Social media ===
Majorino is active across most major social media platforms, with the exception of TikTok. As of August 2026, he had a combined following of over 102,000, comprising 25,575 on his personal Facebook profile, 54,883 on his Facebook public figure page, and 21,600 on Instagram. In September 2026, Majorino became involved in a controversy over criticism of the Israeli government and antisemitism during the early electoral campaign for mayor of Milan. The dispute followed a social media post in which Majorino described Israeli Prime Minister Benjamin Netanyahu as a "genocidal" figure and commented on reports by Haaretz (Israel's newspaper of record) that Netanyahu had been warned of the impending 7 October attacks. Former Forza Italia councillor Pietro Tatarella, who had made himself available as a potential centre-right coalition candidate for mayor, subsequently accused Majorino of antisemitism and warned that Milan risked having an "antisemitic mayor".

Majorino, whose wife is of Jewish descent and whose political career has included opposition to discrimination and racism, rejected the accusation as "serious and intolerable" and announced that he would file a criminal complaint against Tatarella for defamation. He argued that criticism of the Israeli government's actions should not be equated with hatred towards Jewish or Israeli people, adding that he considered the accusation politically motivated in the context of the 2027 Milan municipal election. In his post, Majorino wrote: "Genocidal Netanyahu knew everything. The activists around the world who denounced him were right. He wanted the pretext to carry out a massacre. And the pretext was there: the terrorist madness of 7 October." He added that "one need not be a conspiracy theorist" to believe the reports concerning Netanyahu's prior knowledge because "the cause and effect are there for everyone to see", and concluded: "We must continue to talk about Gaza, where the massacre of innocent people continues." Il Giorno described his post, which caused the controversy, as containing "strong but factual language".

== Works ==
- Giovani anno zero. Viaggio nella nuova generazione. Satelliti. 2000.
- Dopo i lampi vengono gli abeti. Pequod. 2005.
- L'eterno giovedì. Dalai editore. 2007.
- Togliendo il dolore dagli occhi. Italic/Pequod. 2011.
- Maledetto amore mio. Laurana editore. 2014.
- Milano come Lampedusa? Dossier sull'emergenza siriana (edited with Caterina Sarfatti). Novecento. 2014.
- Nel labirinto delle paure. Politica, precarietà e immigrazione (with Aldo Bonomi). Turin: Bollati Boringhieri. 2018.
- La Resa. Per amore della Lombardia: capire il disastro per guarirne le ferite (with Lorenzo Zacchetti). Milan: Ledizioni. 2020.
- Sorella rivoluzione. Mondadori. 2022.

== See also ==
- 2019 European Parliament election in Lombardy
