= Stefano Parisi =

Italian businessman and politician (born 1956)

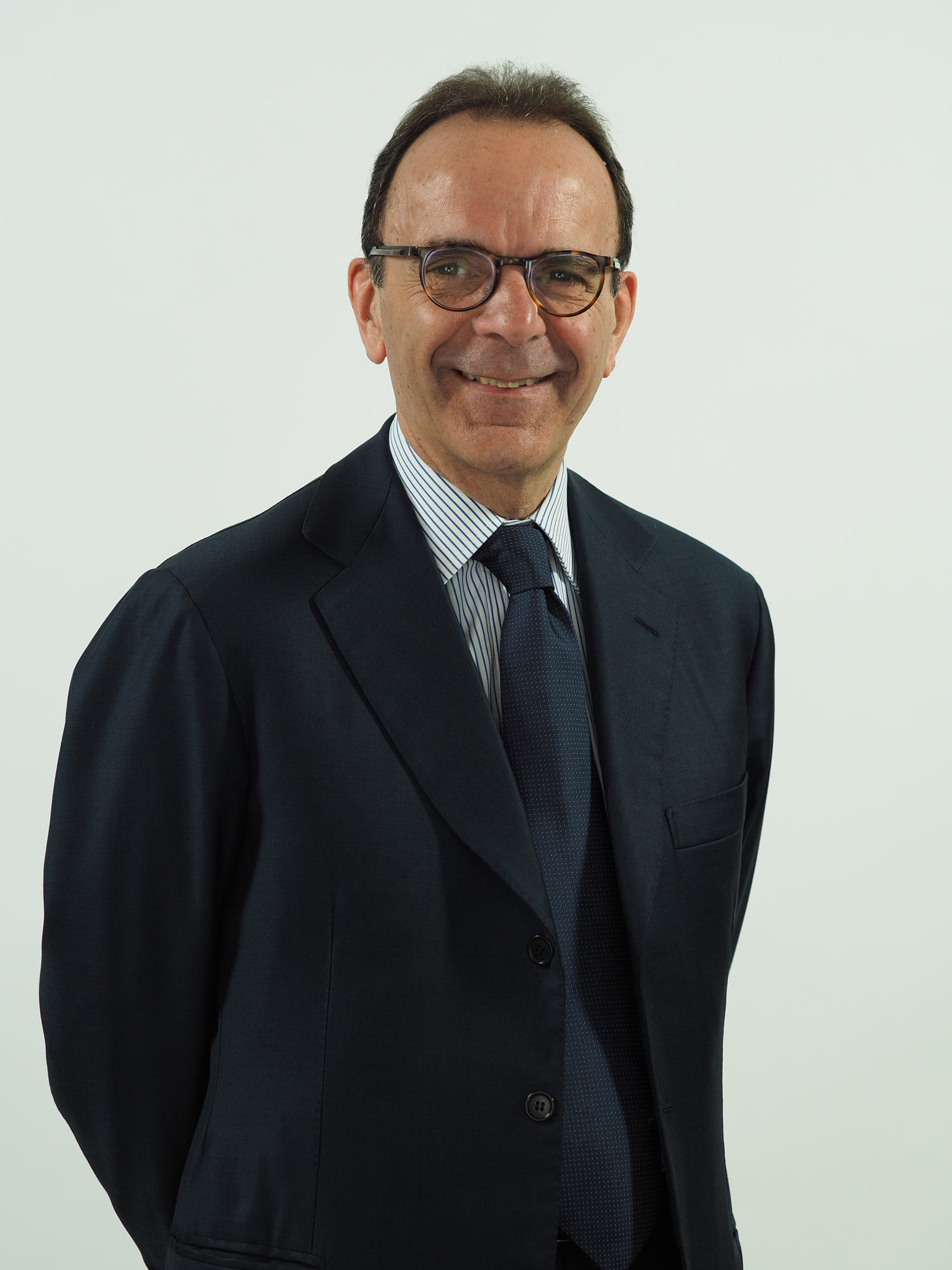
Parisi in 2016

Stefano Parisi (born 12 November 1956) is an Italian businessman and politician. He was the general secretary of Confindustria for four years and founder of Energies for Italy, a political party member of the centre-right coalition.

== Early life and education ==
Parisi was born in Rome. During his studying years in the 1970s, he worked as a Vice-Secretary of the university's Italian Socialist Party (PSI) nucleus of his city. After graduating from the Sapienza University of Rome in Economics and Commerce, he began working at the CGIL study office, and always kept on a socialist level.

== Career ==
In 1984, Parisi became Head of the Technical Secretariat of the Ministry of Labour, the post he abandoned four years later. In 1988, he passed to the Vice-Presidency of the Council of the Ministers during the De Mita government. In 1989, Parisi obtained the same office at the Ministry of Foreign Affairs with the minister Gianni De Michelis of the PSI and remained there until 1991.

In 1992, Parisi became the Head of the Department of Economic Affairs of the Presidency of the Council of Ministers. In 1994, he was chosen as a Secretary General of the Ministry of Post and Telecommunications just established with the beginning of the mobile telephony market. Parisi joined the RAI auditors' board in 1994 and became Head of the Information and Publishing Department of the Council Presidency in 1996. In 1997, he left both the RAI board of auditors and the Department of Economic Affairs of the Presidency of the Council of Ministers, working as a City Manager of Milan, whose mayor was Gabriele Albertini. In 2000, he left his post and assumed the position of general secretary of Confindustria during the presidency of Antonio D'Amato. In 2009, he became president of Assotelecomunicazioni-Asstel. In 2010, he left Swisscom, after being involved in the investigation for alleged international tax fraud with Silvio Scaglia being a president of Fastweb.

In 2012, Parisi moved to the leadership of Chili Tv, a company that dealt with the distribution of films. In 2016, he ran for the post of mayor of Milan from the centre-right coalition supported by Silvio Berlusconi, Matteo Salvini, Maurizio Lupi, and Albertini. Parisi's opponent was Giuseppe Sala, a representative of the centre-left coalition. In June 2016, Parisi lost the Milan municipal election and Sala was elected mayor. After his defeat, Parisi founded Energies for Italy. In January 2018, Parisi became the president of Lazio candidate with the centre-right coalition; His principal opponents were the incumbent president Nicola Zingaretti (centre-left coalition), the outgoing deputy Roberta Lombardi (Five Star Movement), the incumbent Amatrice mayor Sergio Pirozzi (supported by Gianni Alemanno and Francesco Storace), and the CasaPound candidate Mauro Antonini. On 4 March 2018, per the Tatarella Law of 1995 still in force, Parisi became regional councilor and the leader of the opposition he arrived second in the electoral race of presidential candidates, with 31% of the votes.

== Personal life ==
Since 1997, Parisi lives in Milan with his wife and two daughters.

== See also ==
- 2016 Milan municipal election
- 2018 Lazio regional election

Party political offices
Preceded by Francesco Storace (The Right); 2013	Centre-right coalition nominee for President of Lazio; 2018	Succeeded by Francesco Rocca (Independent); 2023
Party political offices
Preceded by Letizia Moratti (PdL); 2011	Centre-right coalition nominee for Mayor of Milan; 2016	Succeeded by Luca Bernardo (Independent); 2021
