= Jean-Léonard Touadi =

Italian politician

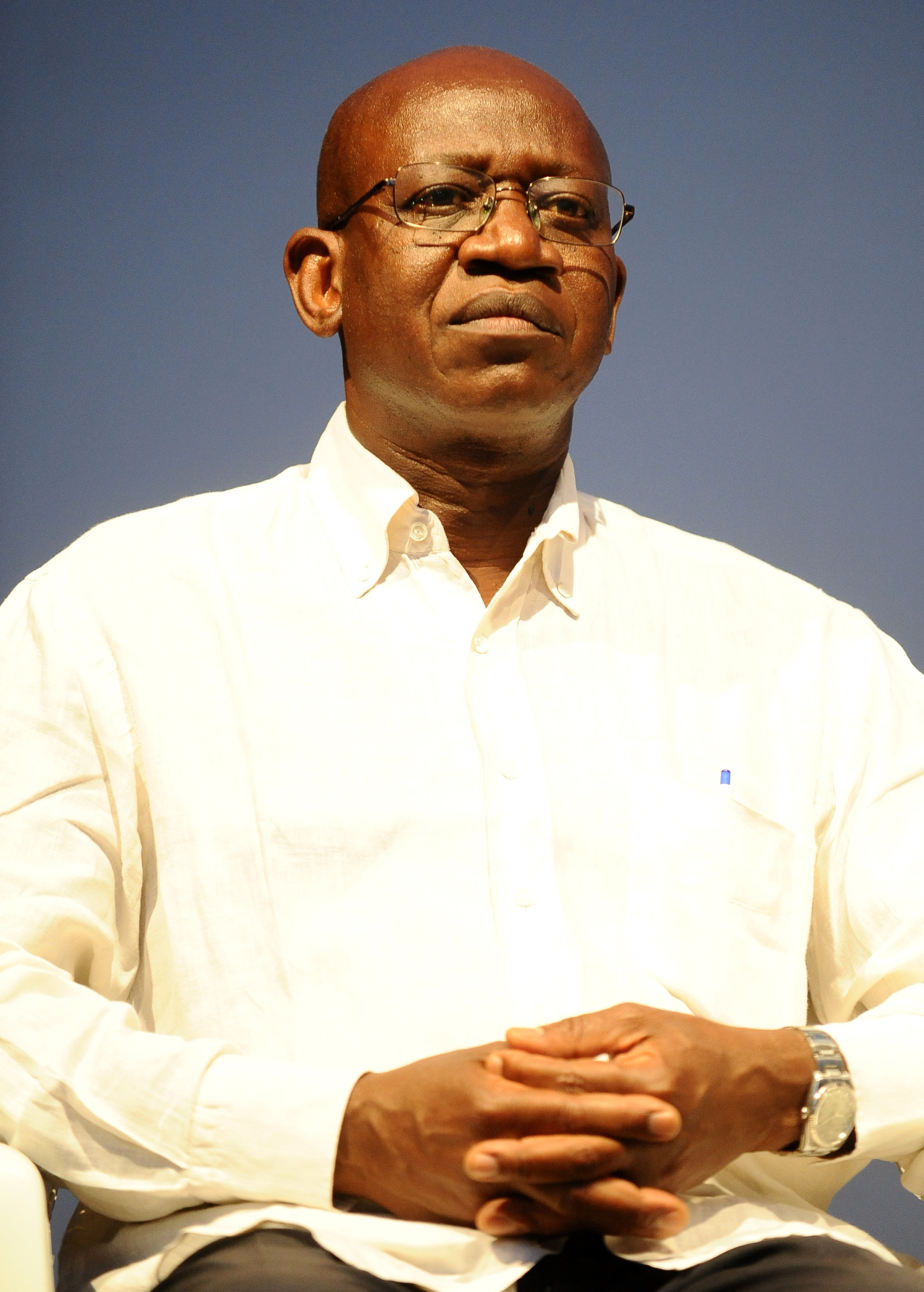

Member of the Chamber of Deputies
- In office 8 May 2008 – 14 March 2013
- Constituency: Lazio

Personal details
- Born: 25 January 1959 (age 67) Brazzaville, Democratic Republic of Congo
- Party: IdV (until 2008); PD (2008-2017); CP (since 2018)
- Spouse: Cristina Bacillieri
- Children: Sophie-Claire (2005); Sandrine (2007)
- Profession: University professor
- Website: http://www.touadi.com/

Jean-Léonard Touadi (born 25 January 1959 in Brazzaville, Republic of the Congo) is a Congolese-Italian journalist, author and politician. Touadi was raised in France and immigrated to Italy in 1979. There, he rose to prominence as a television journalist and as Rome's deputy mayor in charge of security.

In the 2008 general election he was elected to the Italian Parliament with Italy of Values (IdV), becoming Italy's second black Member of Parliament (MP) and the first MP from sub-Saharan Africa. On 11 July 2008, few months after his election, he left the IdV and joined the Democratic Party (PD).

He is married to Cristina Bacillieri and they have two daughters: Sophie-Claire (2005) and Sandrine (2007).

== Bibliography ==
(in Italian) Profile at Italian Chamber of Deputies

- http://www.italymag.co.uk/italy/politics/italy-gets-third-black-mp
- http://www.adnkronos.com/AKI/English/Politics/?id=1.0.2074789726

Italian Chamber of Deputies
Preceded by Title jointly held	Deputy; Legislatures; XVI; 2008 – present	Incumbent
