= Postepay =

Prepaid card service of Poste Italiane

Postepay S.p.A.
- Type: Subsidiary
- Industry: Finance
- Founded: 26 November 2007; 18 years ago
- Founder: Poste Italiane
- Headquarters: Rome, Italy
- Area served: Italy
- Key people: Roberto Giacchi (Chairman, CEO)
- Products: Prepaid cards
- Owners: Poste Italiane (100%)
- Parent: Poste Italiane
- Subsidiaries: PosteMobile (100%)
- Website: postepay.poste.it

Postepay is an Italian company that offers a prepaid card service, launched at the end of 2003 and still marketed by Poste Italiane, which can be used anywhere in Italy (ATM and POS of the Postamat and Visa Electron circuits) and abroad (ATM and POS of the Visa/Visa Electron circuit), on the Internet (in sites that accept Visa and Visa Electron cards) and in all Italian post offices through the Postamat circuit. It also offers mobile and fixed telephony services through PosteMobile.

Postepay does not require opening a current account and does not require the existence of a support current account. It can be topped up at the post office in cash at the Postamat ATMs of Italian Post by debiting the amount on Maestro, MasterCard, and Visa and Visa Electron circuit cards, through the official website via a SIM card, through PosteMobile, or through Sisal authorized offices. Poste Italiane also provides an online top-up service. In 2015, Poste Italiane declared that it had issued 13.5 million Postepay cards.

== Editions ==
- Postepay Standard, standard card;
- Postepay Evolution, card with account function equipped with IBAN codes for credits and transfers;
- Postepay Junior, card dedicated to children aged 10 to 18;
- Postepay PosteMobile, card connected to a PosteMobile SIM;
- Postepay Gift, disposable card;
- Postepay NewGift, evolution of the Gift version;
- e-Postepay, virtual card only;
- Postepay Twin, two rechargeable prepaid cards, one named and one anonymous;
- Postepay Moneygram, prepaid card that allows you to send money abroad;
- Postepay Lunch, card to be used as a rechargeable meal voucher;
- Postepay&GO, card on which you can load all ordinary, senior and student season tickets;
- Postepay IoStudio, card made for students in collaboration with the Ministry of Education, University and Research.
