= Gruppo Assicurativo Poste Vita =

Italian insurance group

Poste Vita S.p.A.
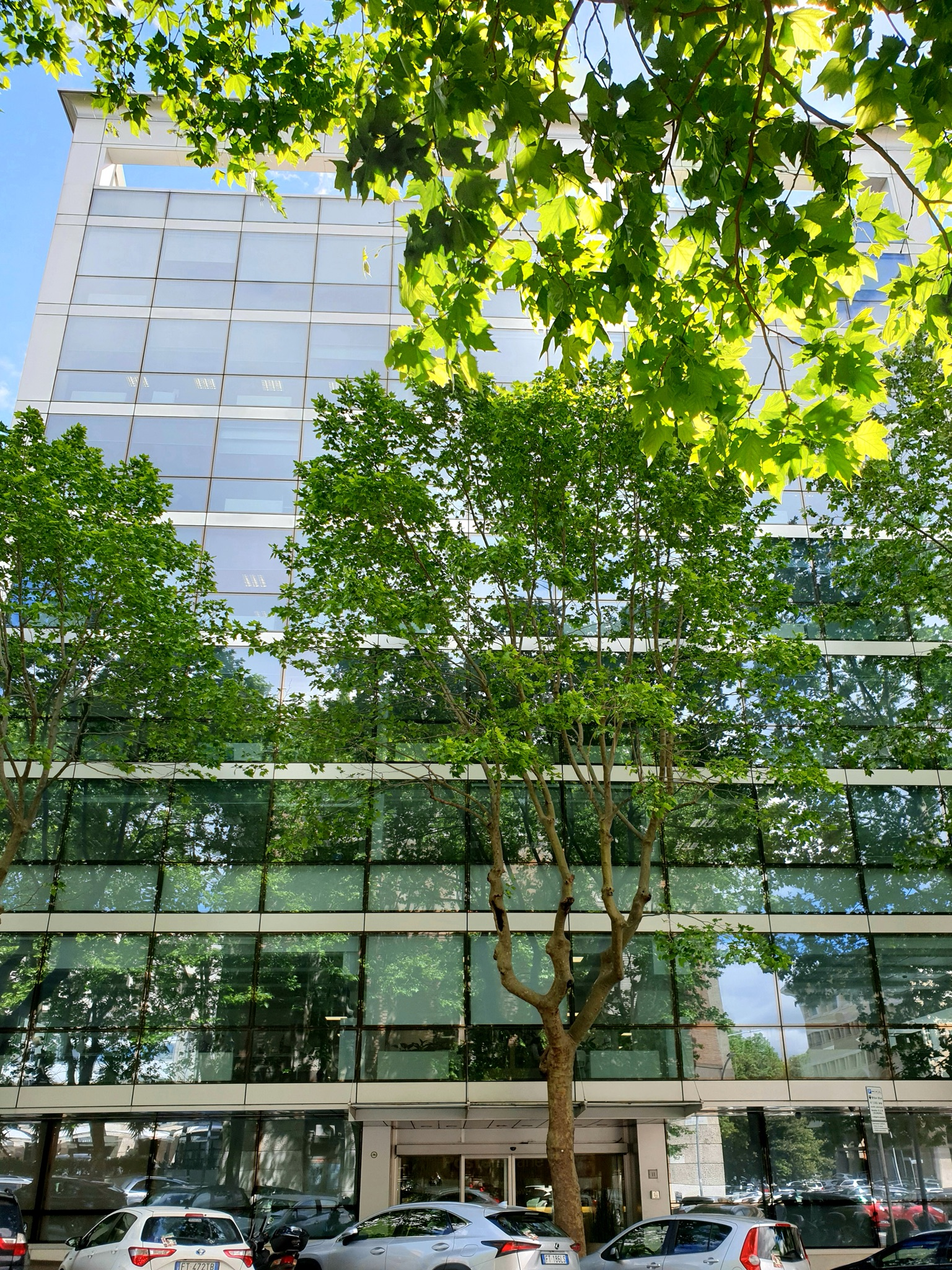
- Poste Vita offices in Viale Beethoven, Rome (2019)
- Type: Subsidiary
- Industry: Insurance
- Founded: 1996; 30 years ago in Naples
- Founder: Poste Italiane
- Headquarters: Viale Europa 190, Rome, Italy
- Area served: Italy
- Key people: Andrea Novelli (chairman); Laura Furlan (CEO)
- Services: Life insurance, pension products, non-life insurance (through subsidiaries)
- Revenue: ▲€1.645 billion (insurance revenue) (2025)
- Operating income: ▲€1.544 billion (2025)
- Net income: ▲€1.092 billion (2025)
- Total assets: ▲€176.118 billion (2025)
- Total equity: ▼€6.530 billion (2025)
- Owner: Poste Italiane (100%)
- Parent: Poste Italiane
- Subsidiaries: Poste Assicura (100%); Net Insurance (58.70%)
- Website: postevita.poste.it
- Footnotes; Figures from the consolidated financial statements of the Poste Vita insurance group

The Gruppo Assicurativo Poste Vita (Poste Vita insurance group) is an Italian insurance group owned by Poste Italiane. Its parent company, Poste Vita S.p.A., is a life insurance company wholly owned by Poste Italiane. The group also includes the non-life insurer Poste Assicura, the broker Poste Insurance Broker and a controlling stake in the insurer Net Insurance.

== History ==
Poste Vita was set up by Poste Italiane in 1996 with its registered office in Naples. It was authorised to operate as a life insurer by the insurance regulator ISVAP in March 1999. Its registered office was later moved to Rome. Poste Assicura, which writes non-life business other than motor insurance, was founded in 2010 and is wholly owned by Poste Vita.

According to Ricerche e Studi, a subsidiary of Mediobanca, Poste Vita was the fourth-largest insurance company in Italy by gross premiums in 2014. A study by PricewaterhouseCoopers ranked it second in the Italian life insurance market that year, with a 14.0% share.

On 28 September 2022 the board of Poste Vita approved a voluntary takeover bid for Net Insurance, an insurer listed in Milan, with the aim of delisting it. The bid was carried out through the vehicle Net Holding, which held 97.84% of Net Insurance after the squeeze-out was completed in April 2023. IBL Banca then acquired 40% of Net Holding. After Net Holding was liquidated, Poste Vita held a direct stake of 58.70% in Net Insurance at the end of 2025.

Poste Vita held a minority stake in Cronos Vita Assicurazioni, the company that took over the policies of the failed insurer Eurovita. Following the demerger of Cronos Vita, effective 1 October 2025, part of its portfolio was transferred to Poste Vita and the stake was derecognised.

In June 2025 Andrea Novelli, previously chief executive officer, became chairman, while Maria Bianca Farina moved from chairman to vice chairman and Laura Furlan was appointed chief executive officer.

== Operations ==
In 2025 the group recorded gross premiums of €21.034 billion, an 11% increase on the previous year; €19.838 billion came from investment products and €1.196 billion from protection products. Net income was €1.092 billion.

In the premium ranking for 2025 published by the Italian insurers' association ANIA, Poste Vita was the third-largest insurance group in Italy, up from fourth place in 2024.

The group also holds minority stakes in Europa Gestioni Immobiliari (45%) and in Eurizon Capital Real Asset SGR (20%).
