= Sergio Pirozzi =

Italian football manager (born 1965)

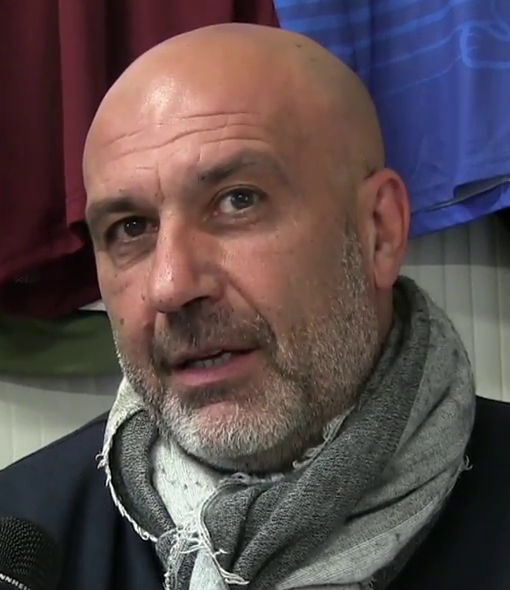

Personal information
- Date of birth: 26 January 1965 (age 61)
- Place of birth: San Benedetto del Tronto, Italy
- Position: Full back

Senior career*
Years	Team	Apps	(Gls)
?	L'Aquila	?	(?)

Managerial career
- 1994–1998: Amatrice
- 1998–2000: Fiumicino
- 2001–2002: Centro Italia
- 2002–2003: Ostiamare
- 2003–2004: Sorianese
- 2004–2006: Rieti
- 2007: Viterbese
- 2009: Messina
- 2010–2011: Aprilia
- 2011–2012: Civitavecchia
- 2012–2013: Palestrina
- 2013: Viterbese
- 2014–2016: Trastevere
- 2020–2021: Trastevere
- 2023: Atletico Ascoli
- 2023: Alessandria
- 2024-2025: Lazio Under 20
- 2025-2026: Lucchese
- * Club domestic league appearances and goals

Sergio Pirozzi (born 26 January 1965) is an Italian football coach, former defender and politician.

== Football career ==
After a minor career as a full-back, Pirozzi took on his first coaching role in 1994 in charge of then-Seconda Categoria club Amatrice, leading the small amateur club all the way up to Promozione during his four-year stay at the club. He successively took on other regional clubs of Lazio at Eccellenza and then Serie D level. In 2004, Pirozzi led Rieti to win the Serie D title and then guided the club in their successive 2005–06 Serie C2 campaign. In January 2007, he took over as the new head coach of Serie C2 club Viterbese, guiding them until the end of the season.

On 2 November 2009, Pirozzi served as head coach of Messina in the Serie D for a single game against Acicatena, then resigning just three days after his appointment.

After serving as head coach at a number of Serie D teams from Lazio such as Aprilia, Civitavecchia and Palestrina, Pirozzi returned to Viterbese in October 2013, serving only for four league games in the Eccellenza division.

Later in 2014, Pirozzi was hired as the new head coach of Rome-based Eccellenza club Trastevere, guiding them to promotion in his first season. After guiding the club on a successful debut campaign in the Serie D, Pirozzi resigned in August 2016 following the Central Italy earthquake that destroyed the city of Amatrice, where he was serving as mayor at the time.

In 2020, Pirozzi agreed to return to Trastevere for the club's 2020–21 Serie D campaign.

In December 2021, Serie D club Sambenedettese announced the appointment of Pirozzi as their new head coach; however, he retracted after Sambenedettese ultras showed their disapproval of the appointment as he was a fan of the rival team Ascoli.

In September 2022, Pirozzi successfully obtained the UEFA Pro coaching licence.

In March 2023, Pirozzi was appointed in charge of Eccellenza club Atletico Ascoli, guiding them to promotion to Serie D by the end of the season. He was sacked on 31 October 2023 following a negative start in the club's 2023–24 Serie D campaign.

On 23 November 2023, Serie C club Alessandria announced to have hired Pirozzi as their new head coach, on what was set to be his first head coaching job for a professional club since 2007. His stint at Alessandria lasted only one month, as he was removed from his coaching post on 27 December 2023.

The following season, he coaches Lazio Under 20, temporarily replacing Stefano Sanderra, who remains in the club's technical management, unable to follow the team for personal reasons. In the summer of 2025, he becomes the new coach of Lucchese, just re-founded after the latest bankruptcy.

== Political career ==
Despite being born in San Benedetto del Tronto, Pirozzi grew up in Amatrice. In 1995 he was elected city councillor of Amatrice and appointed deputy mayor. He was successively elected councillor of the Province of Rieti for the right-wing National Alliance and then mayor of Amatrice in 2009.

As an incumbent mayor, he became a national figure in 2016 following the Central Italy earthquake that nearly destroyed the town of Amatrice. A year later, he announced his candidacy as President of Lazio for the 2018 Lazio regional election, where he ran as an independent candidate, obtaining 4.89% of votes and being elected regional councillor. He subsequently joined Brothers of Italy in 2019, then switching his allegiance to the Lega in 2022. In 2023, he declared his political career to be over; one year later, he reverted on his previous decision and accepted a candidacy for the 2024 European Parliament election in Italy as part of the big tent Freedom list, eventually not being elected.
