= BancoPosta =

Financial unit of the Italian Post Office

- Type: Division
- Industry: Banking
- Founded: 1875; 151 years ago, in its current form since 1999
- Founder: Poste Italiane
- Headquarters: Rome, Italy
- Area served: Italy
- Products: Savings accounts, debit cards, investments, insurance
- Total assets: €590 billion (2024)
- Owner: Poste Italiane
- Parent: Poste Italiane
- Website: bancoposta.poste.it

BancoPosta is the Italian postal savings system that operates as a unit of Poste Italiane providing financial services, including savings accounts, prepaid cards, exchange brokerage services, investment services, insurance, and various payment services. BancoPosta does not have a banking license and cannot directly provide loans to third parties, but is involved in the promotion and placement of public loans granted by banks and financial intermediaries. The bank services are available at all post offices in Italy.

== History ==
Poste Italiane always provided the postal savings deposits and offered Post Office Giro Institutions payments (POGIs). Having performed the function of collecting postal savings since 1875, with postal savings accounts being available since 1917. The BancoPosta was founded formally in 1999 after the restructuring by CEO Corrado Passera. It operates under the Financial Services Division company and offers collections and payments, the collection of savings and insurance products for the public.

In 2000 was launched the BancoPosta account, the debit card Postamat and credit card BancoPosta Mastercard, going from 175,000 accounts in December 1999 to 1.68 million in December 2001. The success of the account and the consequent restoration was mainly due to computerization of the 14,000 post offices and creation of a new technology infrastructure (with a total budget of 670 billion lire), which allowed to improve quality and returns.

Since 2001, the bank from a mere asset manager, also becomes a financial intermediary, as it is authorized by the Presidential Decree 144/01 to propose to the public the equities, bonds, shares of investment funds and loans and financing, although with above restrictions: until then the 14,000 post offices could only sell government bonds and those of the privatization.

== See also ==
- Poste Italiane
- Postepay
- List of banks in Italy

== Sources ==
- "D.P.R. 14 marzo 2001, n. 144 - Regolamento recante norme sui servizi di bancoposta" (PDF).
- "cetif.it" (PDF).
- Il circuito Bancoposta, di Giuseppina Chesini - Giuffrè Editore pp. 51, 54
- "Bilancio Poste Italiane S.p.A. al 31.12.12" (PDF). Archived from the original (PDF) on 17 July 2013.
