= Francesca Balzani =

Italian politician

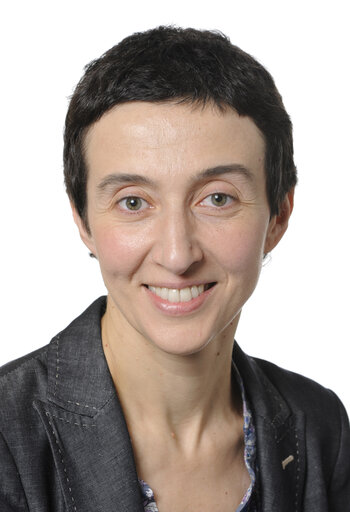

Deputy Mayor of Milan
- In office 17 July 2015 – 26 June 2016
- Leader: Giuliano Pisapia
- Preceded by: Ada Lucia De Cesaris
- Succeeded by: Anna Scavuzzo

Member of the European Parliament
- In office 14 July 2009 – 30 June 2014
- Constituency: North-West Italy

Personal details
- Party: Democratic Party (2007–2016)
- Education: Degree in Law
- Alma mater: University of Genoa
- Profession: Lawyer

Francesca Balzani is an Italian politician and lawyer. She served as a City Councilor for the Budget of the Municipality of Genoa from 2007 to 2009 and was a Member of the European Parliament for the Democratic Party during the 7th legislature. From 2015 to 2016, she held the office of Deputy Mayor of Milan.

== Career ==
=== Board role ===
In 2005, she was appointed to the Board of Directors of the Cassa di Risparmio di Genova e Imperia foundation.

=== Genoa City Council ===
In 2007, she received her first public office, becoming City Councilor for the Budget of Genoa in the center-left administration of Mayor Marta Vincenzi.

=== European Parliament ===
On 7 June 2009, Balzani was elected to the European Parliament as a MEP for the North-West Italy constituency (covering Liguria, Lombardy, Piedmont, and Aosta Valley) with the Democratic Party.

In the European Parliament, she was a member of:

- Committee on Budgets
- Special Committee on the Policy Challenges and Budgetary Resources for a Sustainable European Union post 2013
- Delegation to the ACP–EU Joint Parliamentary Assembly

She also served as a substitute member of:

- Committee on International Trade
- Committee on Budgetary Control
- Committee on Transport and Tourism
- Delegation for relations with India.

In 2012, she became the second woman in EU history to be appointed General Rapporteur for the European Union budget for 2012.

=== Milan City Council ===
On 18 March 2013, she joined the City Council of Milan as Councilor for Budget, Heritage, and Taxes, following a cabinet reshuffle in the center-left administration led by Mayor Giuliano Pisapia.

On 17 July 2015, after Ada De Cesaris resigned from the City Council, Balzani also assumed the role of Deputy Mayor of Milan.

On 9 January 2016, she announced her candidacy in the Democratic Party primaries for the mayoral election of Milan. On 28 January 2016, Balzani received open endorsement from outgoing Mayor Giuliano Pisapia, as well as from her two opponents in the 2010 PD primaries, Stefano Boeri and Valerio Onida.

=== Board role ===
In June 2017, Balzani joined the Board of Directors of Banca Carige representing majority shareholder Vittorio Malacalza. She resigned in July 2018, citing objections to the likely sale of Carige’s stake in Autofiori. She returned to the board on 20 September 2018 after its renewal.

== Academic career ==
A pupil of Victor Uckmar, an internationally renowned jurist, Balzani worked with him as a lawyer until 2007, focusing on local authorities and the non-profit sector.

She taught in postgraduate courses, including a Master’s in Tax Law at Bocconi University in Milan.
