= List of members of the European Parliament for Italy, 2009–2014 =

Members of the European Parliament for Italy
ECSC delegation	(1952)
EP delegation	(1958)
1st term	(1979)
2nd term	(1984)
3rd term	(1989)
4th term	(1994)
5th term	(1999)
6th term	(2004)
7th term	(2009)
8th term	(2014)
9th term	(2019)
10th term	(2024)

This is a list of the 72 members of the European Parliament for Italy in the 2009 to 2014 session.

After the entry into force of the Treaty of Lisbon, the seats of Italy in the European Parliament increased from 72 to 73 per 1 December 2011. The additional seat was assigned to Union of the Centre (that went from 5 to 6 seats).

== List ==
Name	National party	EP Group
Elisabetta Gardini	The People of Freedom	EPP
Salvatore Iacolino	The People of Freedom	EPP
Giovanni La Via	The People of Freedom	EPP
Clemente Mastella	The People of Freedom	EPP
Barbara Matera	The People of Freedom	EPP
Mario Mauro	The People of Freedom	EPP
Erminia Mazzoni	The People of Freedom	EPP
Cristiana Muscardini	The People of Freedom	EPP
Alfredo Pallone	The People of Freedom	EPP
Aldo Patriciello	The People of Freedom	EPP
Crescenzio Rivellini	The People of Freedom	EPP
Licia Ronzulli	The People of Freedom	EPP
Potito Salatto	The People of Freedom	EPP
Amalia Sartori	The People of Freedom	EPP
Marco Scurria	The People of Freedom	EPP
Sergio Silvestris	The People of Freedom	EPP
Francesca Balzani	Democratic Party	S&D
Luigi Berlinguer	Democratic Party	S&D
Rita Borsellino	Democratic Party	S&D
Salvatore Caronna	Democratic Party	S&D
Sergio Cofferati	Democratic Party	S&D
Silvia Costa	Democratic Party	S&D
Andrea Cozzolino	Democratic Party	S&D
Rosario Crocetta	Democratic Party	S&D
Francesco De Angelis	Democratic Party	S&D
Paolo De Castro	Democratic Party	S&D
Leonardo Domenici	Democratic Party	S&D
Roberto Gualtieri	Democratic Party	S&D
Guido Milana	Democratic Party	S&D
Pier Antonio Panzeri	Democratic Party	S&D
Mario Pirillo	Democratic Party	S&D
Gianni Pittella	Democratic Party	S&D
Vittorio Prodi	Democratic Party	S&D
David Sassoli	Democratic Party	S&D
Debora Serracchiani	Democratic Party	S&D
Gianluca Susta	Democratic Party	S&D
Patrizia Toia	Democratic Party	S&D
Gabriele Albertini	The People of Freedom	EPP
Sonia Alfano	Italy of Values	ALDE
Magdi Allam	Union of the Centre	EPP
Roberta Angelilli	The People of Freedom	EPP
Antonello Antinoro	Union of the Centre	EPP
Alfredo Antoniozzi	The People of Freedom	EPP
Pino Arlacchi	Italy of Values (until 17 November 2010) Democratic Party	ALDE (until 17 November 2010) S&D
Raffaele Baldassarre	The People of Freedom	EPP
Paolo Bartolozzi	The People of Freedom	EPP
Sergio Berlato	The People of Freedom	EPP
Mara Bizzotto	Lega Nord	EFD
Vito Bonsignore	The People of Freedom	EPP
Mario Borghezio	Lega Nord	EFD (until 3 June 2013) NI
Antonio Cancian	The People of Freedom	EPP
Carlo Casini	Union of the Centre	EPP
Giovanni Collino	The People of Freedom	EPP
Lara Comi	The People of Freedom	EPP
Ciriaco De Mita	Union of the Centre	EPP
Herbert Dorfmann	South Tyrolean People's Party	EPP
Carlo Fidanza	The People of Freedom	EPP
Lorenzo Fontana	Lega Nord	EFD
Vincenzo Iovine	Italy of Values (until 7 November 2010) Alliance for Italy (until 12 October 2011) Independent (until 13 November 2012) Democratic Party	ALDE (until 23 October 2012) S&D
Claudio Morganti	Lega Nord (until 4 November 2013) Independent (until 6 February 2014) I Change	EFD
Tiziano Motti	Union of the Centre	EPP
Fiorello Provera	Lega Nord	EFD
Oreste Rossi	Lega Nord (until 14 March 2013) Independent (until 13 April 2014) Forza Italia	EFD (until 11 June 2013) NI (until 2 July 2013) EPP
Niccolò Rinaldi	Italy of Values (until 14 April 2014) Independent	ALDE
Matteo Salvini	Lega Nord	EFD
Giancarlo Scottà	Lega Nord	EFD
Francesco Speroni	Lega Nord	EFD
Salvatore Tatarella	The People of Freedom	EPP
Giommaria Uggias	Italy of Values	ALDE
Gianni Vattimo	Italy of Values	ALDE
Iva Zanicchi	The People of Freedom	EPP
Andrea Zanoni (from 19 July 2011)	Italy of Values (until 29 September 2012) Independent (until 30 September 2013) Democratic Party	ALDE (until 12 March 2014) S&D

=== Party representation ===
National party	EP Group	Seats	±
The People of Freedom	EPP	29 / 72	
Democratic Party	S&D	21 / 72	
Lega Nord	EFD	9 / 72	
Italy of Values	ALDE	7 / 72	
Union of the Centre	EPP	5 / 72	
