= 2014 European Parliament election in Lombardy =

The 2014 European Parliament election took place in Italy on 25 May 2014.

In Lombardy the centre-left Democratic Party was by far the largest party with 40.3% of the vote, largely distancing Forza Italia (16.9%), the Five Star Movement (15.7%) and Lega Nord (14.6%). The centre-right's tally, including also the New Centre-Right (3.7), which ran in a joint list with the Union of the Centre, and Brothers of Italy (2.8%), was 37.9%: it was the first time ever that the centre-left topped the centre-right in a regionwide election. The three most voted candidates in Lombardy were Matteo Salvini (Lega Nord, 180,844), Alessia Mosca (Democratic Party, 141,780) and Giovanni Toti (Forza Italia, 116,120).

== Results ==
Party	votes	%
Democratic Party	1,971,915	40.3
Forza Italia	826,201	16.9
Five Star Movement	769,862	15.7
Lega Nord	714,835	14.6
New Centre-Right – Union of the Centre	180,451	3.7
The Other Europe	171,928	3.5
Brothers of Italy	134,939	2.8
European Greens – Green Italia	49,878	1.0
Italy of Values	30,878	0.6
European Choice	30.660	0.6
I Change – MAIE	8,576	0.2
Total	4,890,123	100.00

Source: Ministry of the Interior
