= 2014 European Parliament election in Friuli-Venezia Giulia =

The European Parliament election of 2014 took place in Italy on 25 May 2014.

In Friuli-Venezia Giulia the centre-left Democratic Party came largely ahead with 42.2% of the vote, followed by the Five Star Movement (18.9%), Forza Italia (14.3%) and the League (9.3%), represented by the Friuli-Venezia Giulia League in the region.

== Results ==
Party	Votes	%
Democratic Party	241,970	42.2
Five Star Movement	108,163	18.9
Forza Italia	81,756	14.3
Lega Nord	53,337	9.3
Brothers of Italy	25,457	4.4
New Centre-Right – Union of the Centre	24,683	4.3
The Other Europe	21,219	3.7
European Greens – Green Italia	6,215	1.1
European Choice	3,513	0.6
South Tyrolean People's Party (Note: Including the Slovene Union.)	3,284	0.6
Italy of Values	2,568	0.5
I Change – MAIE	987	0.2
Total	573,152	100.00

Source: Ministry of the Interior
