= 2014 European Parliament election in Veneto =

The European Parliament election of 2014 took place in Italy on 25 May 2014.

In Veneto the centre-left Democratic Party came largely ahead with 37.5% of the vote, followed by the Five Star Movement, distant second at 19.9%. Among the parties of the governing coalition in the region, Lega Nord (whose regional wing is Liga Veneta) came first with 15.2% of the vote, followed by Forza Italia (14.7%) and the New Centre-Right (3.5), which ran in a joint list with the Union of the Centre. The centre-right's tally, including also Brothers of Italy (3.3%), was 36.7%: it was the first time ever that the centre-left topped the centre-right in a regionwide election. The five most voted candidates in Veneto were Alessandra Moretti (Democratic Party, 138,901 preference votes), Flavio Tosi (Lega Nord, 83,171), Flavio Zanonato (Democratic Party, 80,387), Matteo Salvini (Lega Nord, 67,148) and Mara Bizzotto (Lega Nord, 42,787).

== Results ==
Party	Votes	%
Democratic Party	899,723	37.5
Five Star Movement	476,305	19.9
Lega Nord	364,477	15.2
Forza Italia	352,788	14.7
New Centre-Right – Union of the Centre	83,859	3.5
Brothers of Italy	79,503	3.3
The Other Europe	65,821	2.7
European Greens – Green Italia	24,719	1.0
European Choice	20,594	0.9
South Tyrolean People's Party	13,459	0.6
Italy of Values	11,302	0.5
I Change – MAIE	5,194	0.2
Total	2,397,744	100.00

Source: Ministry of the Interior
