= 2014 European Parliament election in Trentino-Alto Adige/Südtirol =

The European Parliament election of 2014 took place in Italy on 25 May 2014.

The Democratic Party (PD) was by far the most voted list in Trentino (42.4%), while the South Tyrolean People's Party (SVP) was by far the largest party in South Tyrol (48.0%). SVP's Herbert Dorfmann, outgoing MEP, was largely the most voted candidate in the region (86,879 preference votes) as well as in both provinces (16,588 in Trentino and 70,291 in South Tyrol). In the preferences' regional tally Dorfmann was followed by Alessandra Moretti (PD, 17,746) and Oktavia Brugger (Greens–The Other Europe, 17,270). Dorfmann was the only candidate from the region to be elected (in his case, re-elected) to the European Parliament.

== Results ==
=== Trentino ===
| Party | Votes | % |
|---|---|---|
| Democratic Party | 93,038 | 42.4 |
| Five Star Movement | 33,954 | 15.5 |
| South Tyrolean People's Party | 26,402 | 12.0 |
| Forza Italia | 22,293 | 10.1 |
| Lega Nord | 19,732 | 9.0 |
| The Other Europe | 8,413 | 3.8 |
| New Centre-Right – Union of the Centre | 5,180 | 2.4 |
| Brothers of Italy | 4,969 | 2.3 |
| European Greens – Green Italia | 3,420 | 1.6 |
| European Choice | 1,137 | 0.5 |
| Italy of Values | 813 | 0.4 |
| I Change – MAIE | 286 | 0.1 |
| Total | 219,637 | 100.00 |

Source: Ministry of the Interior

=== South Tyrol ===
| Party | Votes | % |
|---|---|---|
| South Tyrolean People's Party | 91,736 | 48.0 |
| Democratic Party | 29,944 | 15.7 |
| The Other Europe | 18,948 | 9.9 |
| Five Star Movement | 16,829 | 8.8 |
| Lega Nord | 11,438 | 6.0 |
| Forza Italia | 8,995 | 4.7 |
| European Greens – Green Italia | 7,515 | 3.9 |
| Brothers of Italy | 2,624 | 1.4 |
| New Centre-Right – Union of the Centre | 1,724 | 0.9 |
| Italy of Values | 616 | 0.3 |
| European Choice | 475 | 0.2 |
| I Change – MAIE | 195 | 0.1 |
| Total | 191,039 | 100.00 |

Source: Ministry of the Interior
