= 2014 European Parliament election in Piedmont =

The European Parliament election of 2014 took place in Italy on 25 May 2014.

In Piedmont the Democratic Party was by far the largest party with 40.8% of the vote, largely distancing the Five Star Movement (21.6%) and Forza Italia (15.8%). The three most voted candidates in the region were Mercedes Bresso (Democratic Party, 55,616), Alberto Cirio (32,310) and Matteo Salvini (Lega Nord, 31,947).

== Results ==
Party	Votes	%
Democratic Party	916,571	40.8
Five Star Movement	486,613	21.6
Forza Italia	354,401	15.8
Lega Nord	171,919	7.6
Brothers of Italy	95,432	4.2
The Other Europe	93,206	4.1
New Centre-Right – Union of the Centre	69,774	3.1
European Greens – Green Italia	23,238	1.0
Italy of Values	16,714	0.7
European Choice	16,194	0.7
I Change – MAIE	4,885	0.2
Total	2,248,947	100.00

Source: Ministry of the Interior
