= 2014 European Parliament election in Italy =

- 25 May 2014

All 73 Italian seats to the European Parliament
- Opinion polls
- Turnout: 58.37%
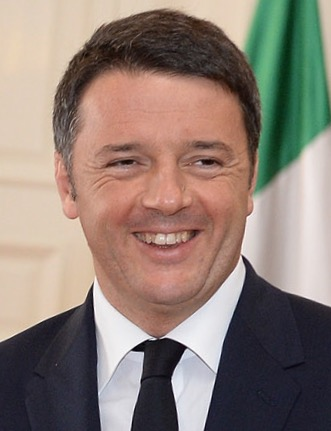

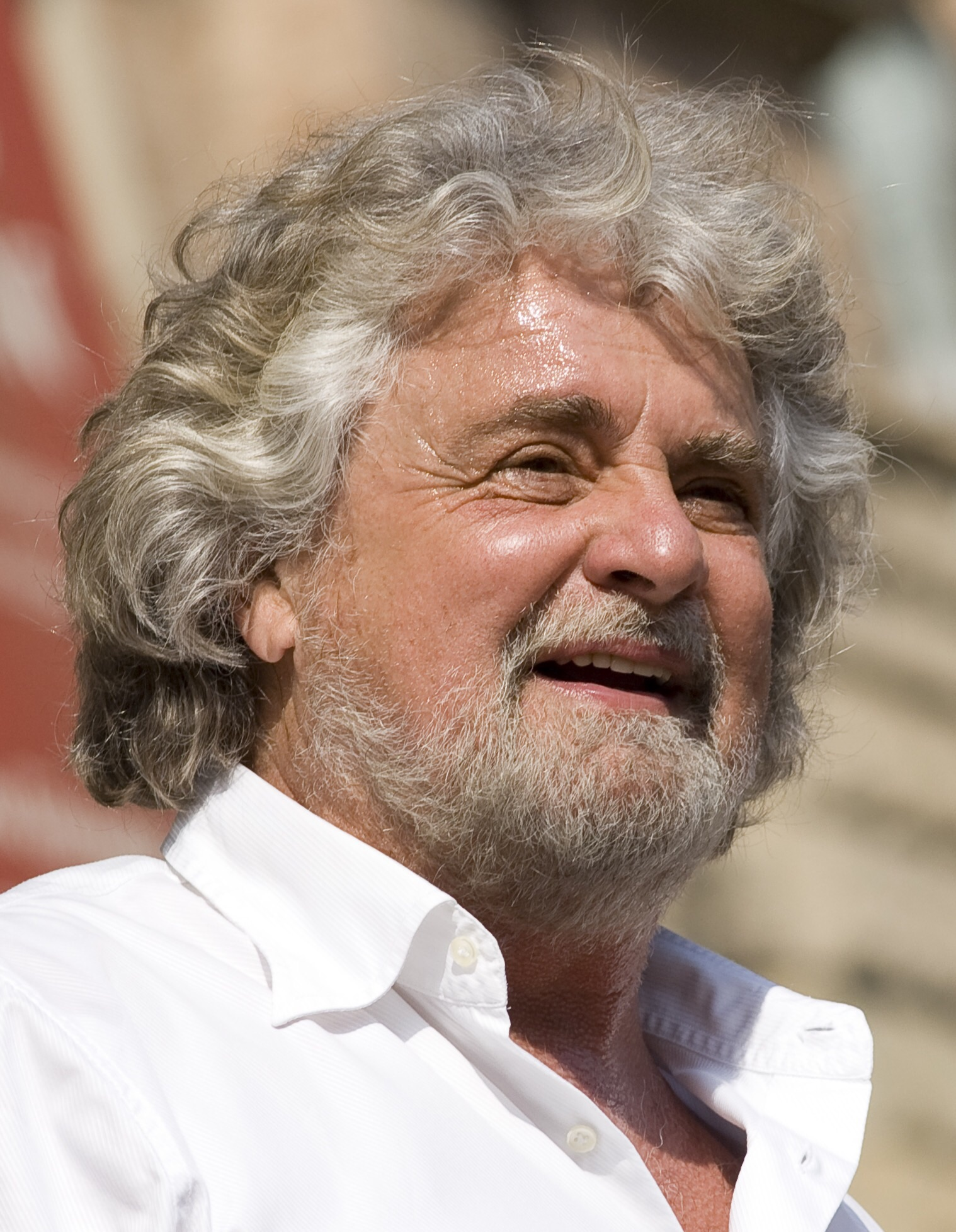

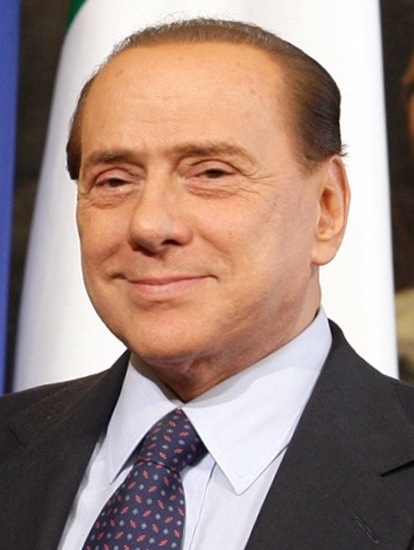

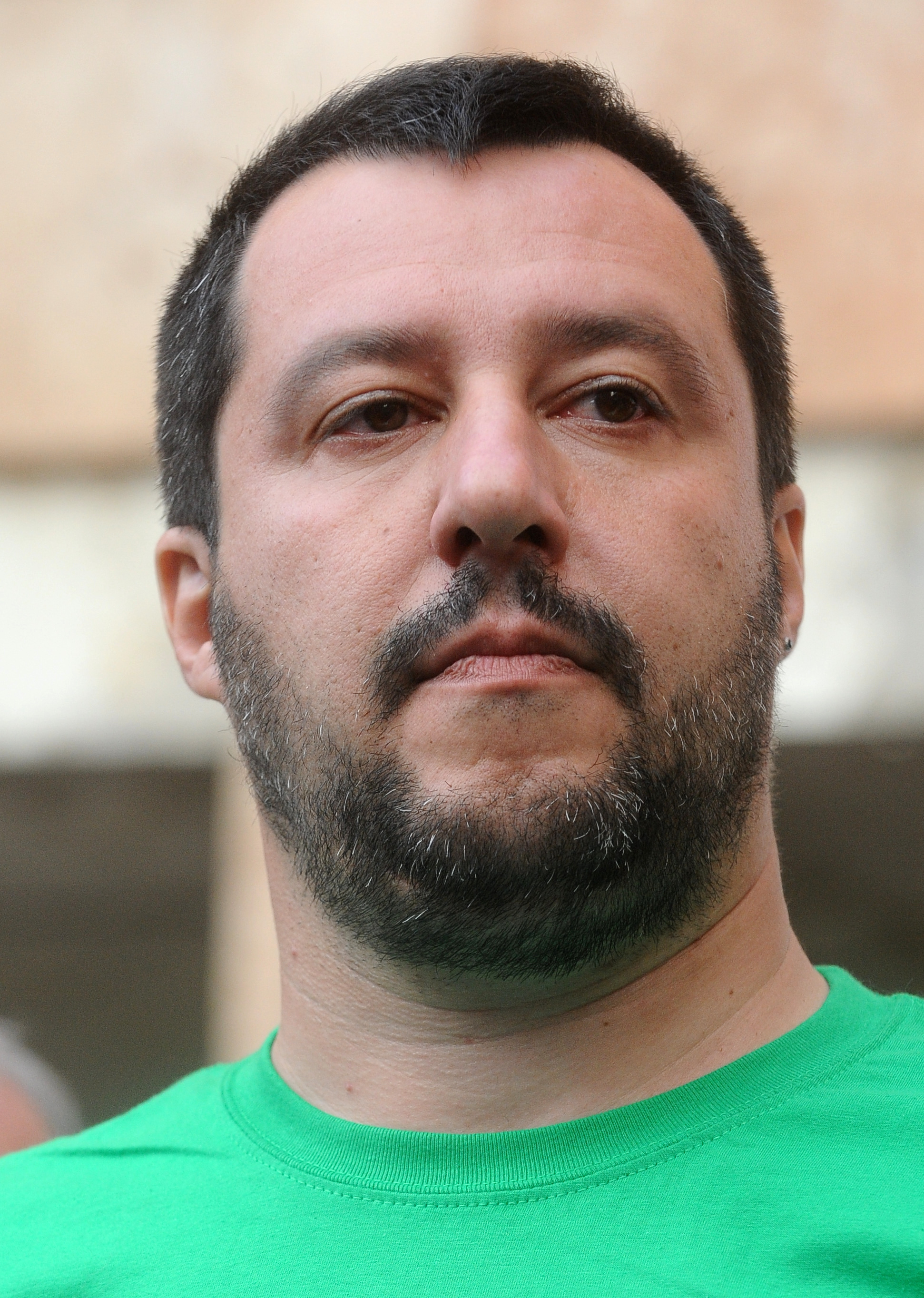

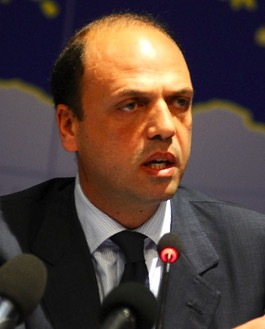
	First party	Second party	Third party
Leader	Matteo Renzi	Beppe Grillo	Silvio Berlusconi
Party	Democratic Party	Five Star Movement	Forza Italia
Alliance	S&D	EFDD	EPP
Leader since	15 December 2013	4 October 2009	18 January 1994
Last election	26.1%, 21 seats	New party	35.3% as PdL; 29 seats
Seats won	31	17	13
Seat change	▲10	New party	▼16
Popular vote	11,203,231	5,807,362	4,614,364
Percentage	40.8%	21.2%	16.8%
Swing	▲14.7%	New party	▼18.5%
	Fourth party	Fifth party	Sixth party
Leader	Matteo Salvini	Angelino Alfano	Collective leadership
Party	Northern League	NCD – UDC	The Other Europe
Alliance	NI	EPP	GUE/NGL
Leader since	7 December 2013	15 November 2013	—
Last election	10.2%, 9 seats	New	New
Seats won	5	3	3
Seat change	▼4	New	New
Popular vote	1,688,197	1,202,350	1,108,457
Percentage	6.2%	4.4%	4.0%
Swing	▼4.0%	New	New
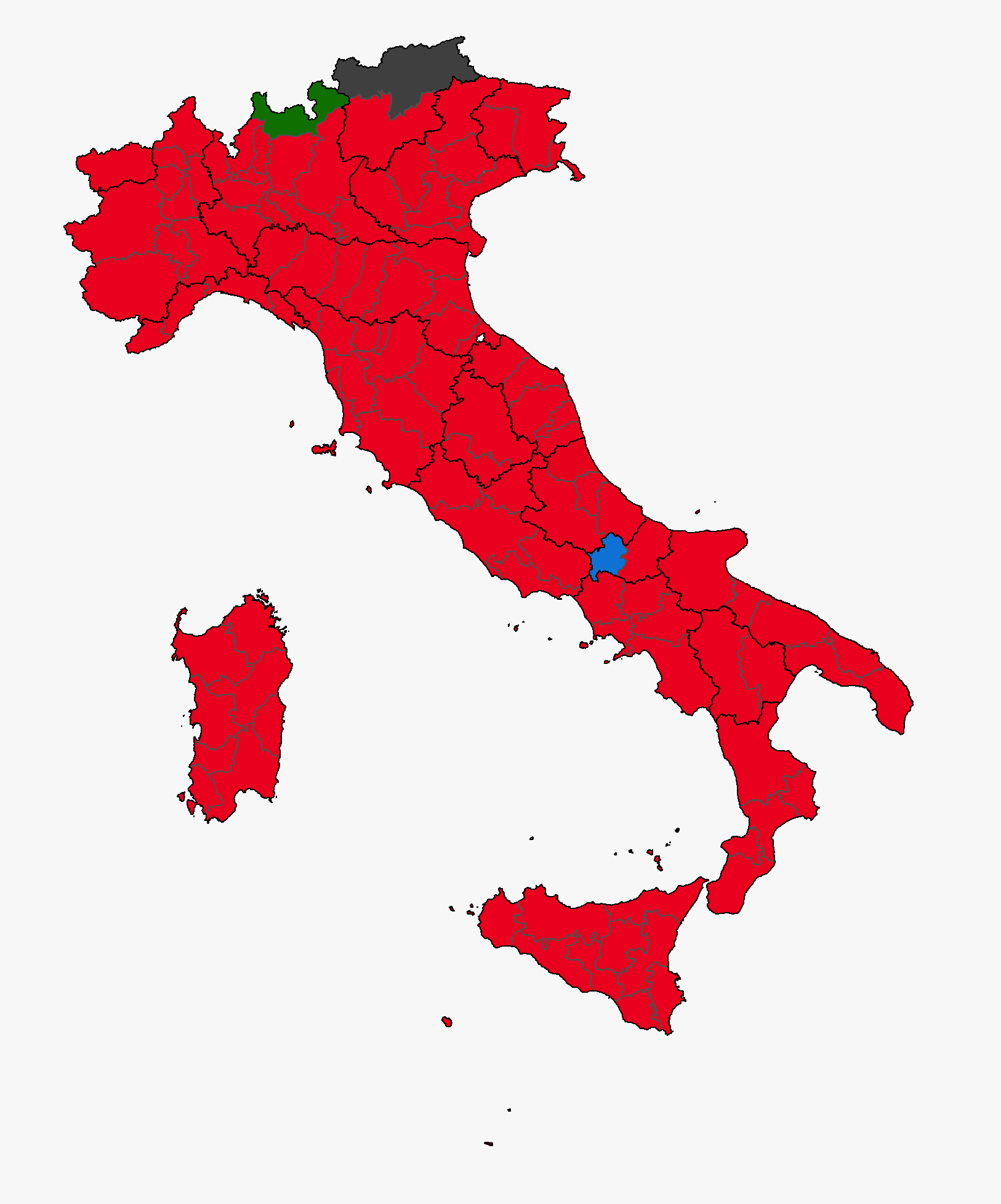
- European election results map. Red denotes provinces with a Democratic Party plurality, Azure denotes those with a Forza Italia plurality, Green denotes those with a Lega Nord plurality, Gray denotes those with a regionalist plurality

The 2014 European Parliament election in Italy took place on 25 May 2014. Italy elected 73 MEPs out of 751 European Parliament seats.

The governing Democratic Party (PD) won the election with 40.8% of the vote and 31 seats, followed by the Five Star Movement (21.2% and 17 seats) and Forza Italia (16.8% and 13 seats). As a result, the PD was the second largest national party in the European Parliament by number of seats after the German CDU/CSU and the largest among the Progressive Alliance of Socialists and Democrats. The PD's score was also the best result for an Italian party in a nationwide election since the 1958 general election, when the Christian Democracy won 42.4% of the vote.

The other parties that have passed the national electoral threshold at 4% are Northern League (6.2% and 5 seats), New Centre-Right – Union of the Centre (4.4% and 3 seats) and The Other Europe (4.0% and 3 seats). The parties that have not passed the electoral threshold and that have not gained any seat are Brothers of Italy (3.7%), European Greens – Green Italia (0.9%), European Choice (0.7%), Italy of Values (0.7%) and I Change – Associative Movement Italians Abroad (0.2%).

The 4% threshold can be bypassed by parties representing linguistic minorities, provided they get more than 50,000 votes, in connection with a party gaining more than 4% of the vote. The South Tyrolean People's Party, representing the German-speaking minority of South Tyrol, won a seat thanks to its connection with the PD.

== Electoral system ==
The party-list proportional representation was the traditional electoral system of the Italian Republic since its foundation in 1946, so it had been adopted to elect the Italian representatives to the European Parliament too. Two levels were used: a national level to divide seats between parties, and a constituency level to distribute them between candidates. Italian regions were united in five constituencies, each electing a group of deputies. At national level, seats were divided between party lists using the largest remainder method with Hare quota. All seats gained by each party were automatically distributed to their local open lists and their most voted candidates.

In the run-up to the 2009 election, the Italian Parliament introduced a national electoral threshold of 4% in the electoral law for the European Parliament; however, the electoral law guarantees representation for linguistic minorities. The parties which represent minorities can be connected with the major parties for the purpose of elections, combining their votes. If the party of the linguistic minority gets more than 50,000 votes, it wins a seat.

=== Constituencies ===
Seats are allocated to party lists on a national basis using an electoral quota, with the residue given to the lists with the largest excess over whole quotas. An electoral quota is then calculated for each list and used to allocate seats to each list in each of the five electoral regions.

Electoral Region	Administrative Regions	Seats
North-West	Aosta Valley, Liguria, Lombardy, Piedmont	20
North-East	Emilia-Romagna, Friuli-Venezia Giulia, Trentino-Alto Adige/Südtirol, Veneto	14
Central	Latium, Marche, Tuscany, Umbria	14
Southern	Abruzzo, Apulia, Basilicata, Calabria, Campania, Molise	17
Islands	Sardinia, Sicily	8

== Main parties and leaders ==
=== Outgoing MEPs ===
This is a list of Italian delegations sitting at the European Parliament before 25 May 2014.

EP Group	Seats	Party	MEPs
European People's Party	34 / 73		
European People's Party	34 / 73	Forza Italia	15
European People's Party	34 / 73	New Centre-Right	7
European People's Party	34 / 73	Union of the Centre	5 (Note: Including one MEP of The Populars of Italy Tomorrow.)
European People's Party	34 / 73	Brothers of Italy	2
European People's Party	34 / 73	Populars for Europe	2 (Note: Including one MEP of Populars for Italy and one MEP of UDC.)
European People's Party	34 / 73	South Tyrolean People's Party	1
European People's Party	34 / 73	Union of Democrats for Europe	1
European People's Party	34 / 73	Future and Freedom	1
Progressive Alliance of Socialists and Democrats	23 / 73	Democratic Party	23
Europe of Freedom and Democracy	8 / 73		
Europe of Freedom and Democracy	8 / 73	Northern League	6
Europe of Freedom and Democracy	8 / 73	I Change	1
Europe of Freedom and Democracy	8 / 73	I Love Italy	1
Alliance of Liberals and Democrats for Europe	4 / 73	Italy of Values	4
European Conservatives and Reformists	2 / 73		
European Conservatives and Reformists	2 / 73	Forza Italia	1
European Conservatives and Reformists	2 / 73	Conservatives and Social Reformers	1
Non-Inscrits	2 / 73		
Non-Inscrits	2 / 73	Northern League	1
Non-Inscrits	2 / 73	Independent	1

=== Retiring incumbents ===
The following MEPs are not seeking re-election:

Constituency	Departing MEP	Party	EP Group	First elected	Terms	Date announced
North-East Italy	Vittorio Prodi	Democratic Party	S&D	2004	2	8 March 2014
North-East Italy	Tiziano Motti	UDC	EPP	2009	1	27 April 2014

=== Summary of parties ===
In the following table the twelve parties/lists participating in the election are listed.

Party	Main ideology	Leader	European Party	Seats
Democratic Party (Note: Including PSI and ALPE. PD had 23 MEPs, three of them split from IdV.)	Social democracy	Matteo Renzi	PES	23 / 73
Forza Italia (Note: Legal successor of PdL, including PID, UDEUR and MIR. FI had 17 MEPs, 16 sitting with EPP and one with ECR.)	Liberal conservatism	Silvio Berlusconi	EPP	17 / 73
New Centre-Right – UDC (Note: List composed of NCD and UDC, including Ppl. UdC had 5 MEPs, NCD 6 split from PdL, Ppl 2 split form PdL.)	Christian democracy	Angelino Alfano	EPP	13 / 73
Northern League (Note: Including MpA and DF. LN had 6 MEPs, 5 sitting with EFD and one with NI.)	Regionalism	Matteo Salvini	None	7 / 73
Italy of Values (Note: Including Party of the South.)	Anti-corruption politics	Ignazio Messina	ALDE	3 / 73
Brothers of Italy (Note: Including I Love Italy. FdI had 2 MEPs split from PdL, 2 sitting with EPP, I Love Italy one with EFD.)	National conservatism	Giorgia Meloni	None	3 / 73
European Choice (Note: List composed of SC, FFD and CD, including also CSR, PLI, PRI and other minor parties. CSR had one MEP splits from PdL with ECR.)	Liberalism	Stefania Giannini; Bruno Tabacci; Michele Boldrin	ALDE	1 / 73
I Change – MAIE (Note: Including I Change and MAIE. I Change had one MEP splits from LN with EFD)	Centrism	Angelo Alessandri	None	1 / 73
South Tyrolean People's Party (Note: Including PATT, UpT and SS.)	Regionalism	Arno Kompatscher	EPP	1 / 73
Five Star Movement	Populism	Beppe Grillo	None	0 / 73
The Other Europe (Note: Including SEL, PRC, VGV, Independents and other minor parties.)	Democratic socialism	Collective leadership	PEL	0 / 73
European Greens – Green Italia (Note: Including Green Italia and Federation of the Greens.)	Green politics	Monica Frassoni; Angelo Bonelli	EGP	0 / 73

=== Top candidates ===
In the following table the top candidates of each party/list in the five constituencies are listed. In the case in which the party leader stands in all five of them as top candidate, also the second in the list is shown. The Five Star Movement's slates were compiled following the alphabetical order.

Party	North-West	North-East	Centre	South	Islands	Source
Forza Italia	Giovanni Toti	Elisabetta Gardini	Antonio Tajani	Raffaele Fitto	Gianfranco Micciché	link
Democratic Party	Alessia Mosca	Alessandra Moretti	Simona Bonafé	Pina Picierno	Caterina Chinnici	link
Northern League	Matteo Salvini; Claudio Borghi	Matteo Salvini; Flavio Tosi	Matteo Salvini; Manuel Vescovi	Matteo Salvini; Angelo Attaguile (MPA)	Matteo Salvini; Francesca Donato	link
Italy of Values	Ignazio Messina; Giommaria Uggias	Ignazio Messina; Antonino Pipitone	Ignazio Messina; Paolo Brutti	Ignazio Messina; Aniello Di Nardo	Ignazio Messina; Giommaria Uggias	link
New Centre-Right – Union of the Centre	Maurizio Lupi (NCD)	Antonio Cancian (NCD)	Beatrice Lorenzin (NCD)	Lorenzo Cesa (UDC)	Giovanni La Via (NCD)	link
Five Star Movement	Gabriele Antonica (alphabetical order)	Marco Affronte (alphabetical order)	Laura Agea (alphabetical order)	Isabella Adinolfi (alphabetical order)	Ignazio Corrao (alphabetical order)	link
Brothers of Italy	Giorgia Meloni; Guido Crosetto	Giorgia Meloni; Magdi Allam	Giorgia Meloni; Marco Scurria	Giorgia Meloni; Gianni Alemanno	Giorgia Meloni; Salvatore Deidda	link
The Other Europe	Curzio Maltese	Paola Morandin	Barbara Spinelli	Ermanno Rea	Barbara Spinelli	link
European Choice	Gianluca Susta (SC)	Michele Boldrin (FFD)	Stefania Giannini (SC)	Bruno Tabacci (CD)	Anna Busia (CD)	link
European Greens – Green Italia	Oliviero Alotto (GI)	Syusy Blady	Annalisa Corrado (GI)	Vincenzo Fornaro	Fabio Granata (GI)	link
I Change – MAIE	Agostino D'Antuoni (IC)	Maria Cristina Sandrin	Claudio Morganti (IC)	Davide Vannoni	Davide Vannoni	link
South Tyrolean People's Party	—	Herbert Dorfmann	—	—	—	link

== Opinion polling ==
Poll results are listed according to the date of publication of the survey. Detailed data are usually published in the official website of the Italian government. The publication of opinion polls during the last 15 days of the electoral campaign is forbidden by Italian law.

Date	Polling Firm	FI	PD	LN	UDC	M5S	SC	FdI	NCD	AET	SE	Others	Lead
9 May 2014	Epokè	16.3	30.2	6.8	w. NCD	22.6	w. SE	3.3	5.4	6.3	4.5	4.6	7.6
9 May 2014	Euromedia	20.9	31.4	5.8	w. NCD	25.0	w. SE	3.9	4.6	3.5	2.5	2.4	6.4
9 May 2014	EMG	19.7	33.2	5.1	w. NCD	25.0	w. SE	4.0	4.8	3.7	2.3	2.2	8.2
9 May 2014	IPR	18.8	32.7	5.5	w. NCD	25.0	w. SE	4.0	6.0	3.4	2.5	2.1	7.7
9 May 2014	Ixè	18.2	33.2		w. NCD	26.4	w. SE						6.8
9 May 2014	Ipsos	19.5	33.8	5.2	w. NCD	23.0	w. SE	4.0	6.4	3.0	3.0	2.1	10.8
9 May 2014	ISPO	18.1	34.9	4.9	w. NCD	23.7	w. SE	3.7	6.4	3.7	2.1	2.5	11.2
9 May 2014	Demos&Pi	17.5	32.8	4.5	w. NCD	22.0	w. SE	4.3	7.0	4.5	3.6	3.8	10.8
8 May 2014	Tecnè	21.7	28.8	4.9	w. NCD	27.7	w. SE	4.0	4.5	3.6	2.2	2.6	1.1
8 May 2014	SWG	19.1	34.8	5.6	w. NCD	24.0	w. SE	2.8	5.2	3.7	2.1	2.7	10.8
8 May 2014	Demopolis	17.5	33.5	5.2	w. NCD	26.4	w. SE	4.1	5.7	4.0	2.0	1.6	7.1
8 May 2014	Piepoli	20.0	34.0	4.5	w. NCD	25.0	w. SE	3.5	5.0	3.5	2.5	2.0	9.0
7 May 2014	Euromedia	20.2	31.1	5.2	w. NCD	25.9	w. SE	3.9	4.9	3.5	2.4	2.9	5.2
7 May 2014	Datamedia	20.0	32.0	5.1	w. NCD	26.0	w. SE	3.9	5.1	3.5	2.0	2.4	6.0
7 May 2014	Lorien	19.0	34.0	5.5	w. NCD	23.0	w. SE	3.5	6.5	4.0	2.5	2.0	11.0
6 May 2014	Ipsos	19.4	33.9	5.0	w. NCD	23.9	w. SE	4.1	6.1	3.5	3.0	1.1	10.0
6 May 2014	Demopolis	17.4	33.0	5.3	w. NCD	25.5	w. SE	4.0	5.7	4.1	2.2	2.8	7.5
5 May 2014	IPR	19.0	32.3	5.2	w. NCD	26.0	w. SE	3.8	5.9	3.3	1.6	1.9	6.3
5 May 2014	EMG	19.8	33.6	4.9	w. NCD	24.6	w. SE	4.0	4.9	3.6	2.4	2.2	9.0
5 May 2014	SWG	18.2	35.2	5.5	w. NCD	24.2	w. SE	3.0	5.0	3.5	2.0	3.4	11.0
5 May 2014	Ixè	17.8	33.0	5.3	w. NCD	26.6	w. SE	3.9	4.8	3.8	2.0	2.8	6.4
3 May 2014	IPR	19.0	32.3	5.2	w. NCD	26.0	w. SE	3.8	5.6	3.3	1.6	2.2	6.3
3 May 2014	Ipsos	19.2	34.3	5.3	w. NCD	22.5	w. SE	3.9	6.1	3.3	3.0	2.4	11.8
3 May 2014	ScenariPolitici	17.5	29.8	7.5	w. NCD	27.5	w. SE	4.2	5.0	4.2	2.5	1.8	2.3
30 April 2014	Tecnè	21.3	28.9	5.3	w. NCD	27.4	w. SE	3.8	4.8	3.8	2.3	2.4	1.5
30 April 2014	Datamedia	20.0	31.5	5.1	w. NCD	25.5	w. SE	3.7	5.5	3.7	2.2	2.8	6.0
29 April 2014	Demopolis	17.0	33.2	5.4	w. NCD	25.0	w. SE	3.8	5.6	4.0	2.3	3.7	8.2
29 April 2014	Ipsos	19.3	34.4	5.1	w. NCD	23.7	w. SE	3.9	5.9	3.3	3.2	1.2	10.7
29 April 2014	Lorien	19.0	34.5	5.5	w. NCD	23.5	w. SE	3.0	6.5	4.0	2.0	2.0	11.0
29 April 2014	Piepoli	19.5	34.0	4.5	w. NCD	24.0	w. SE	3.5	6.0	4.0	2.5	2.0	10.0
28 April 2014	IPR	19.0	32.7	5.0	w. NCD	25.0	w. SE	3.8	6.0	3.5	2.8	2.2	7.7
28 April 2014	EMG	19.6	33.1	4.5	w. NCD	24.4	w. SE	4.0	5.1	3.8	2.5	3.0	8.7
28 April 2014	SWG	18.0	35.4	5.6	w. NCD	21.9	w. SE	3.5	4.9	3.8	2.2	4.7	13.5
26 April 2014	Ipsos	19.0	34.9	5.4	w. NCD	21.6	w. SE	4.1	6.3	3.1	3.2	2.4	13.3
24 April 2014	Epokè	15.9	29.1	6.8	w. NCD	22.3	w. SE	2.6	6.2	6.1	5.0	6.0	6.8
24 April 2014	IPR	19.1	32.9	5.1	w. NCD	24.2	w. SE	3.8	5.6	3.7	3.0	2.6	8.7
24 April 2014	Tecnè	21.3	29.2	5.5	w. NCD	27.0	w. SE	3.7	5.0	3.7	2.4	2.2	2.2
24 April 2014	Ixè	17.5	32.1	5.0	w. NCD	27.4	w. SE	3.8	5.1	4.1	2.0	3.0	4.7
23 April 2014	Demopolis	18.0	34.0	5.2	w. NCD	23.8	w. SE	3.7	5.6	3.8	2.1	3.8	10.2
23 April 2014	Euromedia	20.1	32.0	5.0	w. NCD	25.3	w. SE	3.7	4.6	3.4	2.5	3.4	6.7
23 April 2014	Piepoli	19.0	34.0	4.5	w. NCD	24.0	w. SE	3.5	6.0	4.0	2.5	2.5	10.0
23 April 2014	IPR	19.3	32.7	5.0	w. NCD	24.0	w. SE	3.8	5.5	3.8	3.0	2.9	8.7
22 April 2014	EMG	20.3	33.8	4.4	w. NCD	23.4	w. SE	3.7	4.9	4.0	2.5	3.0	10.4
19 April 2014	ScenariPolitici	18.0	28.6	7.0	w. NCD	27.9	w. SE	4.2	6.0	4.8	2.5	1.0	0.7
19 April 2014	Ipsos	19.6	35.0	4.9	w. NCD	21.4	w. SE	3.8	6.4	2.9	3.5	2.5	13.6
18 April 2014	Ixè	18.0	32.8	5.2	w. NCD	25.8	w. SE	3.5	5.5	3.9	2.1	3.2	7.0
18 April 2014	SWG	18.2	35.8	5.0	w. NCD	22.7	w. SE	3.1	4.9	3.9	2.2	4.2	13.1
18 April 2014	Demopolis	17.0	33.5	5.4	w. NCD	24.0	w. SE	3.6	5.5	3.5	2.0	5.5	9.5
17 April 2014	Tecnè	21.0	29.9	5.4	w. NCD	25.4	w. SE	3.8	5.4	4.1	2.6	2.4	4.5
16 April 2014	Datamedia	19.0	32.0	5.2	w. NCD	25.1	w. SE	3.5	5.7	3.9	2.2	3.4	6.9
15 April 2014	Piepoli	19.0	33.5	4.5	w. NCD	24.5	w. SE	3.5	6.5	4.0	2.5	2.0	9.0
15 April 2014	Ipsos	19.6	34.2	5.0	w. NCD	22.7	w. SE	3.5	6.0	3.0	3.1	2.9	11.5
14 April 2014	EMG	20.3	34.4	4.6	w. NCD	22.9	w. SE	3.5	5.2	3.4	2.5	3.2	11.5
14 April 2014	IPR	19.5	32.0	5.0	w. NCD	24.0	w. SE	3.9	6.5	3.8	3.8	1.5	8.0
11 April 2014	Ixè	19.1	32.2	5.2	w. NCD	25.2	w. SE	3.6	5.3	4.2	1.9	3.3	7.0
11 April 2014	SWG	20.3	34.3	4.8	w. NCD	23.0	2.4	2.4	3.8	4.1	0.8	4.1	11.3
10 April 2014	Tecnè	21.4	30.5	5.1	w. NCD	23.8	w. SE	3.6	5.7	4.8	2.4	2.7	6.7
9 April 2014	Ipsos	20.5	33.9	5.8	w. NCD	22.3	w. SE	3.0	5.3	3.1	3.4	2.7	11.6
9 April 2014	Piepoli	19.0	33.0	4.0	w. NCD	24.5	w. SE	3.5	6.0	4.5	2.5	3.0	8.5
9 April 2014	Datamedia	20.0	31.3	5.0	w. NCD	24.3	w. SE	3.3	5.0	3.9	2.3	4.9	7.0
7 April 2014	IPR	20.0	30.5	4.5	w. NCD	23.0	w. SE	3.7	6.0	3.5	3.7	5.1	7.5
7 April 2014	Ixè	18.6	31.6	5.4	1.6	26.1	1.2	3.4	3.3	4.6	—N/a	4.2	5.5
7 April 2014	EMG	20.9	33.9	4.4	w. NCD	22.5	w. SE	3.4	5.1	3.1	2.1	4.6	11.4
5 April 2014	Ipsos	21.1	33.3	5.3	w. NCD	21.2	w. SE	3.5	5.7	3.1	3.8	3.0	12.1
4 April 2014	SWG	19.5	34.8	4.8	1.1	20.0	2.6	2.8	4.1	3.7	0.6	6.0	14.8
3 April 2014	Tecnè	22.0	30.2	4.6	2.2	23.4	—N/a	3.4	3.8	5.2	1.6	3.6	6.8
2 April 2014	Euromedia	21.6	31.5	4.8	1.8	21.4	1.0	3.5	3.9	3.8	2.0	4.7	9.9
2 April 2014	IPR	21.0	30.0	4.3	2.0	22.5	1.0	3.3	4.0	3.5	2.0	6.4	7.5
2 April 2014	Piepoli	20.0	33.0	4.0	2.0	23.0	2.0	3.5	4.0	4.5	—N/a	4.0	10.0
2 April 2014	Datamedia	20.0	31.0	5.0	1.8	24.3	—N/a	3.1	3.4	3.9	2.0	5.5	6.7
1 April 2014	Lorien	22.0	31.5	5.5	1.5	23.0	—N/a	2.5	5.0	4.5	—N/a	4.5	8.5
1 April 2014	Ipsos	21.8	33.0	5.5	3.0	21.0	2.9	3.1	4.3	3.3	—N/a	2.1	11.2
31 March 2014	ScenariPolitici	18.3	27.9	7.1	2.0	25.9	1.4	3.6	4.2	4.8	1.7	3.1	2.0
31 March 2014	EMG	20.8	32.8	4.3	2.2	21.9	1.1	3.4	3.3	3.2	—N/a	7.0	10.9
29 March 2014	SWG	18.8	35.0	5.0	1.3	21.1	2.1	3.1	3.8	4.0	—N/a	5.2	13.9
28 March 2014	Ixè	20.8	30.5	5.8	1.2	25.3	1.4	3.2	3.2	4.9	—N/a	3.7	5.2
27 March 2014	Tecnè	22.9	31.0	3.8	2.0	22.4	—N/a	3.2	3.9	5.8	—N/a	5.0	8.1
26 March 2014	IPR	22.0	29.5	4.3	2.0	23.0	1.0	3.0	4.3	3.5	2.3	5.1	6.5
26 March 2014	Euromedia	22.2	31.5	4.4	1.5	20.8	—N/a	3.1	3.5	4.0	—N/a	9.0	9.3
26 March 2014	Datamedia	20.5	30.5	5.0	1.8	24.0	—N/a	3.0	3.5	3.7	2.0	6.0	6.5
24 March 2014	EMG	22.4	32.4	4.2	2.4	21.3	1.9	2.9	3.6	2.9	—N/a	6.0	10.0
21 March 2014	Ixè	22.7	28.6	4.3	1.9	20.8	1.0	3.1	3.6	6.1	—N/a	7.9	5.9
20 March 2014	Tecnè	23.5	32.4	3.3	1.9	21.9	—N/a	2.9	3.8	5.6	—N/a	4.7	8.9
17 March 2014	IPR	23.0	28.5	4.0	3.0	23.0	1.0	3.0	4.3	4.0	—N/a	6.2	5.5
14 March 2014	Ixè	23.4	29.4	4.5	1.6	22.6	0.9	3.3	3.3	6.5	—N/a	4.5	6.0
13 March 2014	Tecnè	24.4	30.4	4.0	2.0	21.8	—N/a	3.5	3.5	5.4	—N/a	5.0	6.0
13 March 2014	IPR	23.5	28.0	4.3	3.0	24.0	w. UdC	3.0	4.5	4.0	—N/a	5.7	4.0
13 March 2014	Euromedia	23.5	28.5	4.4	2.0	23.1	1.7	2.7	3.7	4.9	—N/a	5.5	5.0
10 March 2014	IPR	24.0	27.5	4.3	w. NCD	24.0	w. SE	3.0	5.5	4.0	2.5	5.2	3.5
7 March 2014	SWG	21.6	30.3	4.9	1.1	22.0	w. SE	2.7	3.3	—N/a	2.3	11.8	8.3
7 March 2014	Ixè	24.0	29.1	4.7	1.9	21.8	1.0	3.5	3.2	6.3	—N/a	4.5	5.1
6 March 2014	Tecnè	24.0	28.2	4.5	1.9	22.4	—N/a	3.1	3.3	—N/a	—N/a	12.6	4.2
3 March 2014	ScenariPolitici	20.0	27.5	6.3	2.2	25.4	2.3	3.1	4.2	5.4	—N/a	3.6	2.1
28 February 2014	Ixè	23.2	28.5	4.6	1.8	22.7	1.1	3.6	3.0	6.9	—N/a	4.6	5.3
21 February 2014	Ixè	22.4	27.6	4.8	1.6	24.9	1.0	3.4	3.1	7.2	—N/a	4.0	2.7
13 February 2014	Tecnè	23.5	29.6	3.9	2.3	25.4	—N/a	3.0	3.7	—N/a	—N/a	8.6	4.2
5 February 2014	IPR	24.3	27.6	5.0	2.0	25.4	1.0	1.5	5.6	—N/a	—N/a	7.6	2.2
7 June 2009	Election results	35.3	26.1	10.2	6.5	—N/a	—N/a	—N/a	—N/a	—N/a	—N/a	15.4	8.8
Date	Polling Firm	FI	PD	LN	UDC	M5S	SC	FdI	NCD	AET	SE	Others	Lead

== Results ==
← Summary of 25 May 2014 European Parliament election results in Italy →
Party	Votes	%	+/−	Seats	+/−
Democratic Party (PD)	11,203,231	40.81	+14.69	31 / 73	+10
Five Star Movement (M5S)	5,807,362	21.15	New	17 / 73	New
Forza Italia (FI)	4,614,364	16.81	−18.45	13 / 73	−16
Northern League (LN)	1,688,197	6.15	−4.06	5 / 73	−4
New Centre-Right – Union of the Centre (NCD–UDC)	1,202,350	4.38	New	3 / 73	New
The Other Europe (AET)	1,108,457	4.03	New	3 / 73	New
Brothers of Italy (FdI)	1,006,513	3.66	New	0 / 73	New
European Greens – Green Italia (GI–VE)	250,102	0.91	New	0 / 73	New
European Choice (CD – SC – FFD)	197,942	0.72	New	0 / 73	New
Italy of Values (IdV)	181,373	0.66	−7.34	0 / 73	−7
South Tyrolean People's Party (SVP)	138,037	0.50	+0.03	1 / 73	±0
I Change – MAIE (IC–MAIE)	50,978	0.18	New	0 / 73	New
Valid votes	27,448,906	94.70			
Blank and Invalid votes	1,542,352	5.30			
Totals	28,991,258	100.00			
Electorate and voter turnout	50,662,460	57.22			
Source: Ministry of the Interior

Popular vote
PD	40.8%
M5S	21.1%
FI	16.8%
LN	6.1%
NCD–UDC	4.4%
AET	4.0%
FdI	3.7%
Others	3.1%

=== Distribution by European group ===
European Parliament group	Seats	National party	Seats
Progressive Alliance of Socialists and Democrats	31 / 73	Democratic Party (PD)	31
Europe of Freedom and Direct Democracy	17 / 73	Five Star Movement (M5S)	17
European People's Party Group	17 / 73	Forza Italia (FI)	13
European People's Party Group	17 / 73	New Centre-Right – Union of the Centre (NCD–UDC)	3
European People's Party Group	17 / 73	South Tyrolean People's Party (SVP)	1
European United Left–Nordic Green Left	3 / 73	The Other Europe (AET)	3
Non-Inscrits	5 / 73	Northern League (LN)	5

== See also ==
- 2014 European Parliament election in Lombardy
- 2014 European Parliament election in Piedmont
