= Stamina =

Stamina may refer to:

== Biology and healthcare ==
- Endurance, the ability of an organism to exert itself and remain active for a long period of time, as well as its ability to resist, withstand, recover from, and have immunity to trauma, wounds, or fatigue
- Stamen (pl.: stamina), the male organ of a flower
- Stamina therapy, a controversial alternative medical treatment based on stem cells

== Other uses ==
- Stamina (horse) (1905–1930), American racehorse
- "Stamina", a song by Tech N9ne from The Worst
- Stamina, a constraint system in a number of video games that limits how often the player can attack, run, jump or otherwise exert energy

== See also ==
- Stam1na, a Finnish heavy metal band
