= European Parliament Committee on Petitions =

European Parliament committee

Committee on Petitions
- Abbreviation: PETI
- Type: Standing committee
- Legislature: European Parliament
- Parliamentary term: 10th European Parliament
- Chair: Bogdan Rzońca; ECR, Poland
- Vice-Chairs: Dolors Montserrat (EPP); Fredis Beleris (EPP); Nils Ušakovs (S&D); Cristina Guarda (Greens/EFA)
- Members: 34
- Political composition: EPP: 9 · S&D: 6 · ECR: 5 · Renew: 2 · PfE: 3 · Greens/EFA: 2 · The Left: 2 · ESN: 2 · NI: 3
- Jurisdiction: Petitions to the European Parliament, citizens' rights, implementation of EU law, relations with the European Ombudsman and participation in European Citizens' Initiative hearings
- Website: Official website

The Committee on Petitions (PETI) is a standing committee of the European Parliament. It examines petitions submitted by European Union citizens and residents on matters falling within the Union's fields of activity and directly affecting them. The committee also monitors problems in the implementation of EU law, maintains relations with the European Ombudsman and participates in public hearings connected with successful European Citizens' Initiatives.

The right to petition the European Parliament is guaranteed by Article 227 of the Treaty on the Functioning of the European Union and Article 44 of the Charter of Fundamental Rights of the European Union. A petition may be submitted individually or jointly with others and may concern any matter within the Union's fields of activity that directly affects the petitioner.

== Responsibilities ==
The committee is responsible for petitions addressed to Parliament and for relations with the European Ombudsman. It also contributes to the organisation of public hearings on European Citizens' Initiatives and considers issues relating to the practical exercise of citizens' rights under Union law.

Its remit includes:

- examining whether petitions are admissible under the Treaties and Parliament's Rules of Procedure;
- requesting information from the European Commission, member states and other institutions;
- referring petitions to other parliamentary committees for opinions or information;
- organising hearings, fact-finding visits and exchanges of views with petitioners;
- drawing Parliament's attention to alleged breaches or incorrect application of Union law;
- preparing reports and resolutions arising from petitions;
- relations with the European Ombudsman and consideration of the Ombudsman's annual report;
- participation in hearings linked to successful European Citizens' Initiatives; and
- safeguarding the practical exercise of the right to petition.

== Petition procedure ==
Petitions may be submitted through Parliament's Petitions Web Portal or by post. They must identify the petitioner, state the subject clearly and concern an area within the European Union's competence that directly affects the petitioner. The committee first determines whether a petition is admissible.

When a petition is declared admissible, PETI may ask the European Commission to investigate, request information from national or regional authorities, refer the issue to another parliamentary committee, hold a public debate, organise a fact-finding mission or recommend that Parliament adopt a resolution. Petitions may remain open while the committee monitors follow-up by the relevant authorities.

The committee does not act as a court and cannot annul decisions taken by national authorities. Its work is instead political and supervisory, using Parliament's powers to bring citizens' concerns to the attention of EU institutions and member-state authorities.

== Role in participatory democracy ==
PETI is one of Parliament's principal channels for direct public participation. Petitions can reveal gaps in legislation, failures in implementation or recurring problems affecting citizens in several member states. The committee may use this information when preparing reports or recommending legislative and administrative action.

The committee is also involved in the European Citizens' Initiative procedure. When an initiative reaches the required number of signatures and is registered for follow-up, PETI is automatically associated with the committee responsible for organising the corresponding public hearing.

== Relations with the European Ombudsman ==
PETI is responsible for Parliament's institutional relationship with the European Ombudsman. It examines the Ombudsman's annual report, prepares Parliament's response and follows issues of maladministration, transparency, access to documents and ethical standards in the EU institutions.

== Chairs ==
The following table lists the chairs of the committee since 1987.

Name	Political group	Member state	Took office	Left office
Raphaël Chanterie	EPP	Belgium	1987	1989
Viviane Reding	EPP	Luxembourg	1989	1992
Rosy Bindi	EPP	Italy	1992	1994
Edward Newman	PES	United Kingdom	1994	1997
Alessandro Fontana	EPP	Italy	1997	1999
Vitaliano Gemelli	EPP–ED	Italy	1999	2004
Marcin Libicki	UEN	Poland	2004	2009
Erminia Mazzoni	EPP	Italy	2009	2014
Cecilia Wikström	ALDE	Sweden	2014	2019
Dolors Montserrat	EPP	Spain	2019	2024
Bogdan Rzońca	ECR	Poland	2024	Incumbent

== Members ==
=== 10th Parliament, 2024–2029 ===
The committee currently has 34 full members. Its current composition is shown below, with the chair and vice-chairs indicated in italics.

European People's Party	Progressive Alliance of Socialists and Democrats	European Conservatives and Reformists	Renew Europe
Dolors Montserrat, Spain, Vice-Chair; Fredis Beleris, Greece, Vice-Chair; Peter Agius, Malta; Alexander Bernhuber, Austria; Gheorghe Falcă, Romania; Norbert Herhammer, Germany; Dariusz Joński, Poland; Elena Nevado del Campo, Spain; Emil Radev, Bulgaria	Nils Ušakovs, Latvia, Vice-Chair; Iratxe García Pérez, Spain; Isilda Gomes, Portugal; Sandra Gómez López, Spain; Murielle Laurent, France; Sandro Ruotolo, Italy	Bogdan Rzońca, Poland, Chair; Galato Alexandraki, Greece; Paolo Inselvini, Italy; Diego Solier, Spain; Ivaylo Valchev, Bulgaria	Michał Kobosko, Poland; Jana Toom, Estonia
Patriots for Europe	Greens–European Free Alliance	The Left	Europe of Sovereign Nations
Sebastian Kruis, Netherlands; Georg Mayer, Austria; Pál Szekeres, Hungary	Cristina Guarda, Italy, Vice-Chair; Ana Miranda Paz, Spain	Damien Carême, France; Valentina Palmisano, Italy	Petras Gražulis, Lithuania; Marcin Sypniewski, Poland
Non-Inscrits			
Lefteris Nikolaou-Alavanos, Greece; Alvise Pérez, Spain; Maria Zacharia, Greece			

==== Substitute members ====
Substitute members of the 10th Parliament (click “show” to expand)

The committee's substitute members are listed below.

European People's Party	Progressive Alliance of Socialists and Democrats	European Conservatives and Reformists	Renew Europe
Ioan-Rareș Bogdan, Romania; Paulo Cunha, Portugal; Dóra Dávid, Hungary; Rosa Estaràs Ferragut, Spain; Stefan Köhler, Germany; Nadine Morano, France	Alex Agius Saliba, Malta; Annalisa Corrado, Italy; Andi Cristea, Romania; Hana Jalloul Muro, Spain; Giannis Maniatis (politician)Giannis Maniatis, Greece; Costas Mavrides, Cyprus; Joanna Scheuring-Wielgus, Poland	Adrian-George Axinia, Romania; Chiara Gemma, Italy; Kosma Złotowski, Poland	Cynthia Ní Mhurchú, Ireland; Eugen Tomac, Romania
Patriots for Europe	Greens–European Free Alliance	The Left	Europe of Sovereign Nations
Juan Carlos Girauta Vidal, Spain; Virginie Joron, France; Fabrice Leggeri, France	Gordan Bosanac, Croatia; Vicent Marzà Ibáñez, Spain	Nikos Pappas, Greece; Isabel Serra Sánchez, Spain	Milan Mazurek, Slovakia
Non-Inscrits			
Erik Kaliňák, Slovakia; Fidias Panayiotou, Cyprus			

== Research support ==
The committee is supported by the European Parliament's research services and policy departments. These services provide studies, briefings and analyses on citizens' rights, the application of EU law, petition systems, participatory democracy, the European Citizens' Initiative and the work of the European Ombudsman.

Research and studies prepared for the committee are published through Parliament's supporting-analyses database and the European Parliament Think Tank.

== See also ==
- Right to petition
- European Citizens' Initiative
- European Ombudsman
- Citizenship of the European Union
- Charter of Fundamental Rights of the European Union
- European Parliament Committee on Civil Liberties, Justice and Home Affairs
- European Parliament Committee on Legal Affairs
