= Erminia Mazzoni =

Italian politician

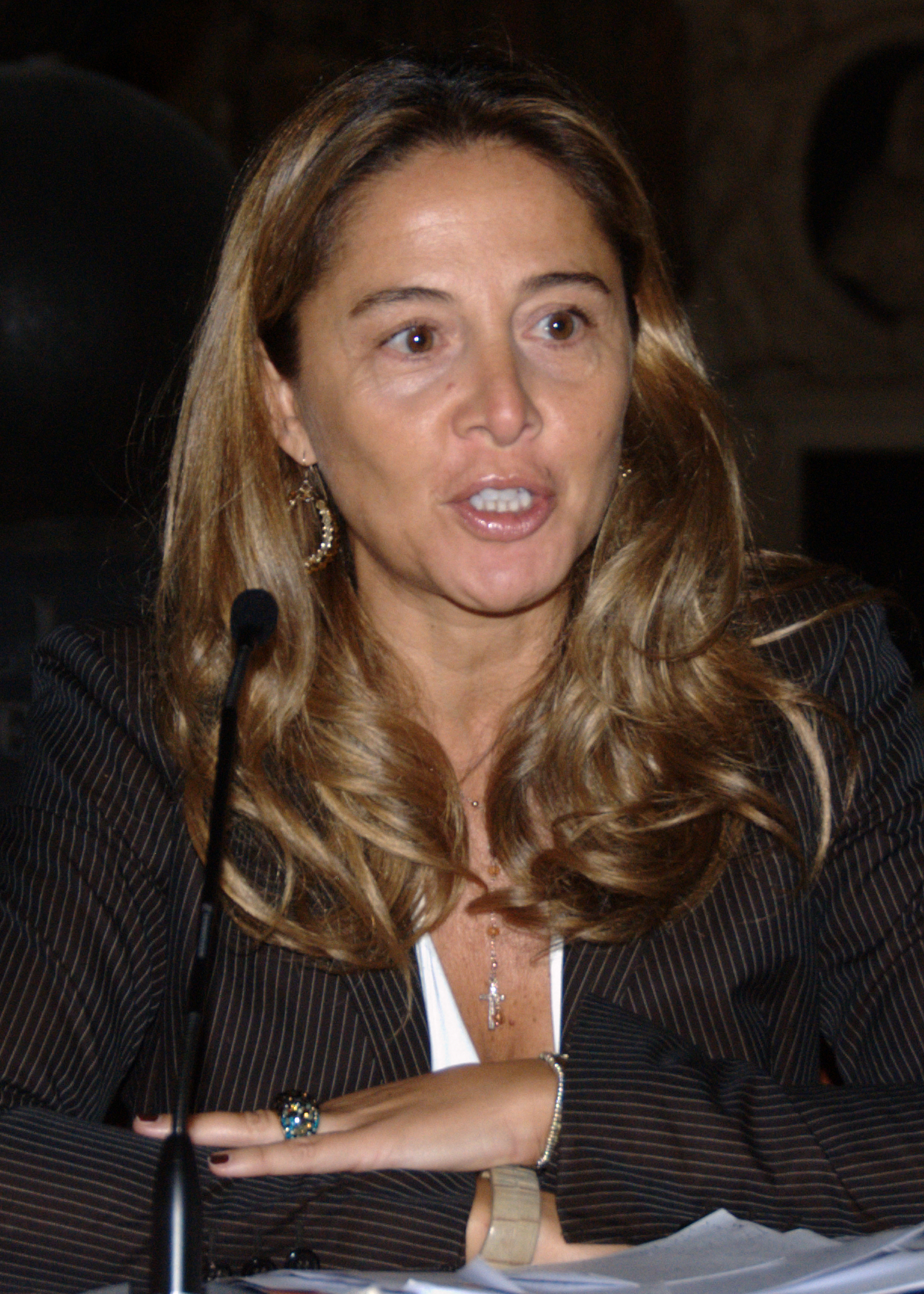

Member of the European Parliament
- In office 14 July 2009 – 30 June 2014

Personal details
- Born: 28 April 1965 (age 60); Naples, Italy
- Political party: New Centre-Right

Erminia Mazzoni (born 28 April 1965 in Naples, Italy) is an Italian politician.

A provincial councilor in Benevento, she was elected by the Chamber of Deputies in the 14th legislature in the House of Freedom lists, in the Centro Cristiano Democratico, and in the 15th in the UDC lists. In 2009 she was elected to the European Parliament on the Popolo della Libertà lists.

== Political career ==
In the 2001 general elections, she ran for the Chamber of Deputies as a candidate from the CCD (Christian Democratic Center) in the single-member district number 10 (Ariano Irpino). She was supported by the parties of the House of Freedoms (Forza Italia, National Alliance, CCD-CDU, and other smaller parties). She emerged victorious and was elected as a deputy for the 14th Legislature.

In 2002, following the dissolution of the Christian Democratic Center, she joined the Union of the Center and served as its national vice-secretary from October 2005 to June 2007. Additionally, she was a member of the national board and council and held the position of national head of the justice department until 2008.

In the subsequent 2006 general elections, she ran for the Chamber of Deputies again, this time in the Campania 2 constituency, as part of the Union of the Center's list (in the fourth position). She was reelected as a deputy for the 15th Legislature.

In the 2008 general elections, she was a candidate for the Senate of the Republic in the Campania region, once more on the Union of the Center's list (in the second position, behind Ciriaco De Mita). However, she was not elected as the party did not surpass the 8% regional threshold.

In 2008, she also ran as the Union of the Center's candidate for the position of President of the Province of Benevento, securing 6.36% of the votes. This represented an increase in her vote share compared to the previous provincial elections, unlike the outcome at the national level.

=== European Parliament ===
In 2009, she left the Union of the Center (UDC) and joined the People of Freedom (PdL), a party with which she ran for the European Parliament in the Southern Italy constituency. She was elected as a Member of the European Parliament (MEP) with over 120,000 preferences, making her one of the most popular candidates.

During her tenure in the European Parliament, she served as the President of the Committee on Petitions.

On 16 November 2013, with the suspension of activities of the People of Freedom (PdL), she joined the New Center-Right (Nuovo Centrodestra) led by Angelino Alfano. However, she left this party in 2014 and did not run for the European elections of that year.

In the 2015 regional elections in Campania, she, along with other defectors from the center-right, including Senator Vincenzo D'Anna and former Deputy Arturo Iannaccone, supported the center-left candidate Vincenzo De Luca, opposing the official center-right candidate Stefano Caldoro.

In the 2016 municipal elections in Benevento, she supported Clemente Mastella, the center-right candidate. Following his victory, on 29 June 2016, she was appointed as the Deputy Mayor of Benevento, responsible for European, national, and regional institutions, community planning, European funds, legality, and transparency. However, she left her position in the municipal council on 10 June 2017, following disagreements with Mayor Mastella.

In the 2020 regional elections, she ran for the Regional Council as the top candidate in the province of Naples for Campania Libera, a civic list supporting the center-left candidate Vincenzo De Luca. However, she was not elected.

== See also ==
- List of members of the European Parliament for Italy, 2009–2014
