= Claudio Morganti =

Italian politician

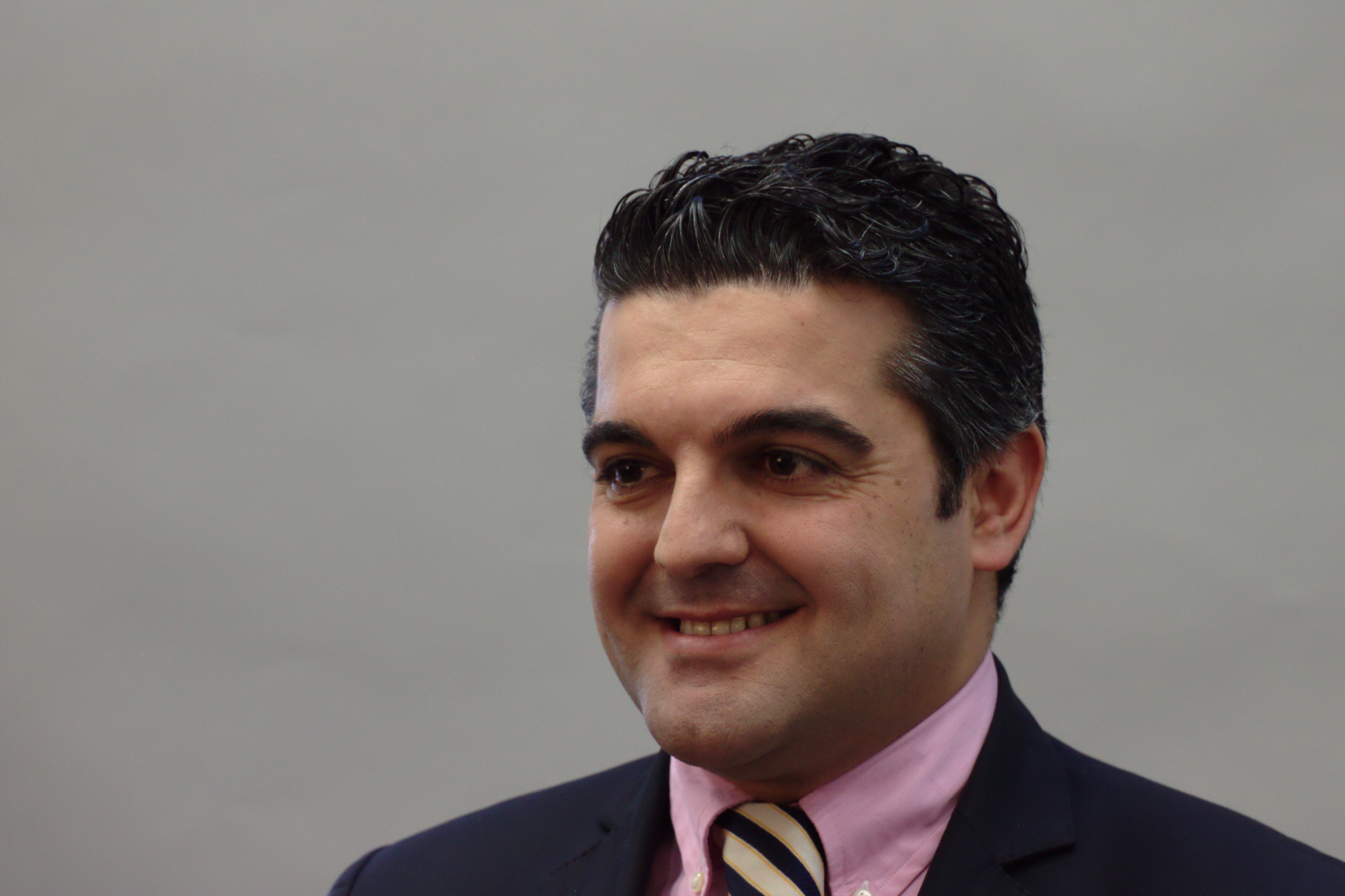

Member of the European Parliament
- In office July 14, 2009 – 2014

Personal details
- Born: April 14, 1973 (age 51); Prato, Italy
- Political party: Lega Nord
- Occupation: Politician

Claudio Morganti (April 14, 1973, Prato, Italy) is an Italian politician.

== Biography ==
From 2002 to 2013 he was a member of the Tuscan Northern League.

From 2004 to 2009 he was a city councilor in Vaiano, in the province of Prato, and from 2005 to 2008 he was provincial secretary of the Lega Nord in Prato.

On June 7, 2009 he was elected for Lega Nord Padania in the 7th legislature (2009–2014) of the European Parliament, joining the Europe of Freedom and Democracy (ELD) Group.

From July 16, 2009, to January 18, 2012 he was a member of the Committee on Budgets and a substitute member of the Committee on Economic and Monetary Affairs in the European Parliament.

From 2009 to 2014 he is a member of the delegation to the EU–Mexico Joint Parliamentary Committee and the Delegation to the Euro-Latin American Parliamentary Assembly.

From 2011 to 2013 he was also a substitute member of the delegation to the ACP-EU Joint Parliamentary Assembly.

In April 2013, he announced that he had been expelled from the Lega Nord due to disagreements with the party's political secretariat. While remaining a member of the ELD in the European Parliament, as of November 5, 2013, he is listed as independent from his national political party of reference.

In 2014 he was a candidate, in the European elections as the chief candidate of Associative Movement of Italians Abroad in the Central Italy Constituency (which gathers the 14 constituencies of Tuscany, Umbria, Marche and Lazio), without being re-elected.

On May 30, 2020 he was arrested for continued grand larceny.
