= Claudio Zin =

Italian-Argentine journalist and politician

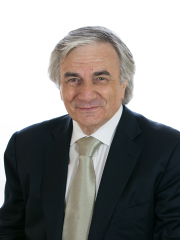
Zin's Senate portrait picture

Claudio Zin (born 11 November 1945) is an Italian-Argentine physician and politician. He was Senator of the Italian Republic representing the Italian people living in South America between 2013 and 2018 belonging to Associative Movement Italians Abroad.

He was born in Bolzano and emigrated with his family to Argentina when he was 5 years old, eventually returned to Italy to live in Milano at age of 15, but moved again to Argentina. In Argentina, he studied medicine at the University of Buenos Aires. He works as a journalist in the Argentina media writing about medicine.

During the administration of Daniel Scioli as governor of Buenos Aires he served as Minister of Public Health between 2007 and 2009.
