= Liberal Democratic Union =

Liberal Democratic Union can refer to the following political parties:

- Liberal Democratic Union (Albania)
- Liberal Democratic Union (Greece), a political party in Greece
- Liberal Democratic Union (Italy), later Federation of Liberals
