= Mirella Giai =

Italian politician (1929–2023)

Mirella Giai (15 August 1929 – 20 April 2023) was an Italian politician. She was a senator from 2008 to 2013.

== Biography ==
Giai was the daughter of Commander Giai, who had emigrated to Argentina and returned in 1943 to fight in the partisan war with the Garibaldi Brigades of Piedmont, and later emigrated again with his family to Rosario.

After years of activism in organizations linked to the Italian Communist Party, he worked alongside Filippo Di Benedetto during the dictatorship of Jorge Rafael Videla (the “dirty war”), collaborating with Italian Consul Enrico Calamai to assist in the emigration of hundreds of Italians, who were thus spared the fate of the “desaparecidos”.

In the 2006 elections, she ran for the Senate as a candidate for The Union (Italy) in Southern America, but with 19,456 votes, she lost to Edoardo Pollastri by a margin of just 67 votes.

She then joined the Associative Movement of Italians Abroad and ran again in South America in the 2008 elections, where she was elected with 23,437 votes. She decided not to run for re-election in 2013.
