= Conservatives and Social Reformers =

Conservatives and Social Reformers Conservatori e Social Riformatori
- President: Cristiana Muscardini
- Founded: October 2012
- Dissolved: 2016
- Split from: Future and Freedom
- Headquarters: Via Vincenzo Bellini 19, Milan
- Ideology: Conservatism
- Political position: Centre-right

Website
- www.movimentocsr.it

The Conservatives and Social Reformers Movement (Italian: Movimento Conservatori e Social Riformatori, abbr. CSR) was a national conservative political party in Italy.

The CSR was formed in October 2012 by Cristiana Muscardini, who had been a long-time MEP with National Alliance (AN) and member of the national assembly of Future and Freedom (FLI), in order to join the European Conservatives and Reformists Group in the European Parliament.

In the 2013 general election the CSR de facto endorsed Act to Stop the Decline, a libertarian party led by Oscar Giannino.

In the 2014 European Parliament election the party supported European Choice, a list sponsored by Alliance of Liberals and Democrats for Europe (ALDE) Party's candidate for President of the European Commission Guy Verhofstadt.
