= Green Italia =

- Co-spokespersons: Annalisa Corrado; Carmine Maturo
- Founded: 28 June 2013
- Dissolved: April 2023
- Merged into: Democratic Party (PD)
- Ideology: Green politics

Website
- www.greenitalia.org

Green Italia was a green political party in Italy. The party was founded in June 2013 by a heterogeneous group of politicians, notably including Monica Frassoni (co-spokesperson of the European Green Party and former independent MEP of the Federation of the Greens), Fabio Granata and Flavia Perina (The People of Freedom and Future and Freedom), Roberto Della Seta and Francesco Ferrante (former senators of the Democratic Party and former leaders of Legambiente), Marco Boato, Fiorello Cortiana and Anna Donati (former Green MPs; Boato, a former Radical, is still an active member of that party), as well as green economy entrepreneurs, intellectuals and activists. Granata left the party in November 2017 to join Diventerà Bellissima for the 2017 Sicilian regional election.

For the 2014 European Parliament election the party presented joint lists with the Greens, under the name European Greens – Green Italia. The list obtained a mere 0.9% of the vote—and 6.0% among Italians abroad. In the municipal election of Padua Francesco Fiore, a member of GI's national board, came fourth with 9.9% at the head of a civic list.

In the 2019 European Parliament election the party ran along with the Federation of the Greens as Green Europe. The list received 2.3% of the vote, quite an improvement from 2014, but still not enough to exceed the 4% threshold.

In 2019–2020 GI was joined by two deputies, Rossella Muroni (independent in the group of Free and Equal) and Lorenzo Fioramonti (splinter from the Five Star Movement and former minister of Education, University and Research), as well as Elly Schlein (former member of the Democratic Party and Vice President of Emilia-Romagna).

In the 2022 Italian general election former MEP Elly Schlein was elected to the Chamber of Deputies as the first candidate on the Democratic Party – Democratic and Progressive Italy list for the multi-member constituency Emilia Romagna 02.

After Elly Schlein's victory in the 2023 Democratic Party leadership election, Annalisa Corrado joined the Democratic Party, Carmine Maturo continues his environmental battles in associations with Gentle Green Events and Slow Food in Naples.

== Leadership ==
- Spokesperson: Oliviero Allotto (2013–2017), Annalisa Corrado / Carmine Maturo (2017–2023)
- President: Monica Frassoni / Fabio Granata (2013–2015)
