= Elisabetta Gardini =

Italian politician (born 1956)

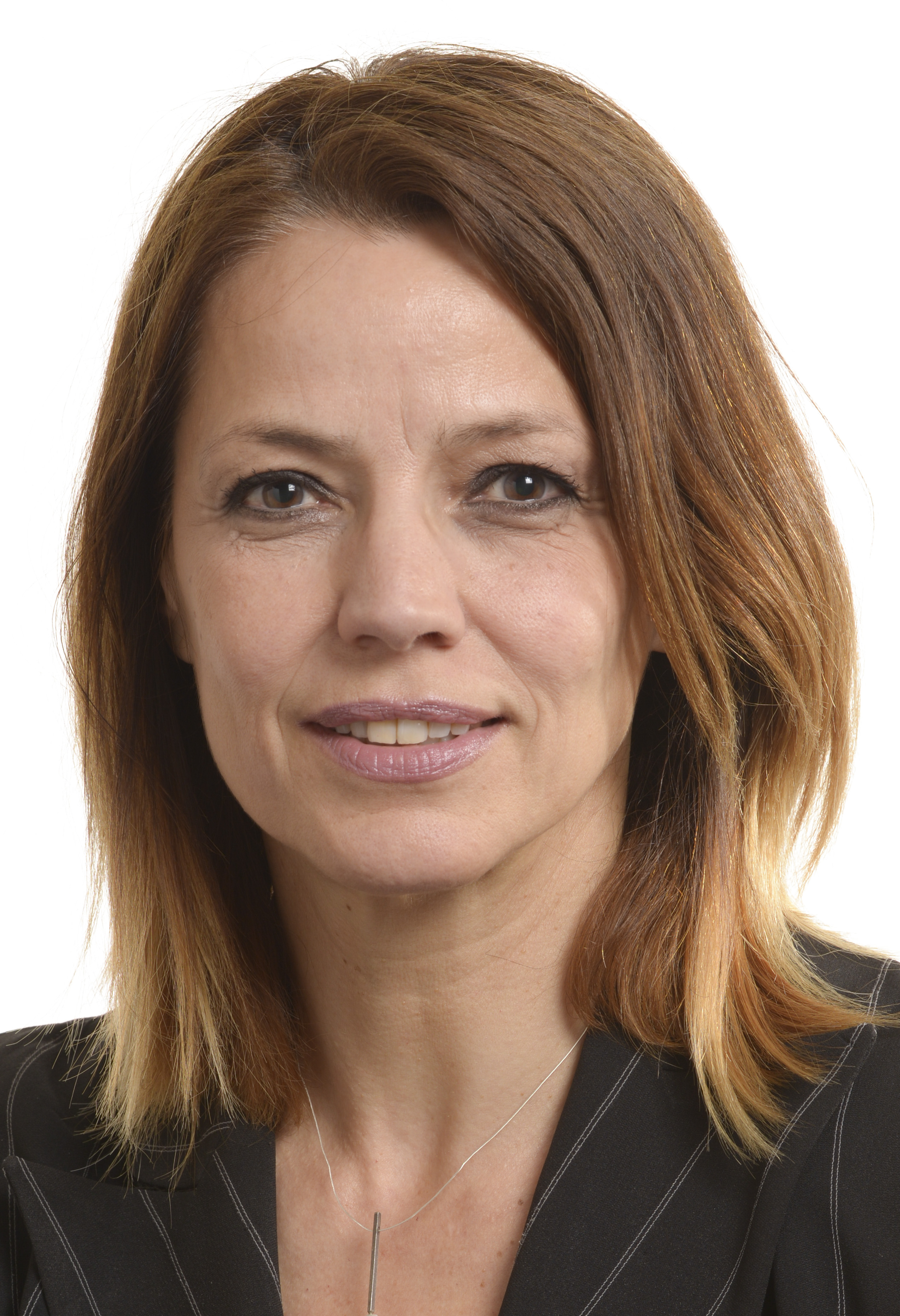

Member of the European Parliament
- In office 30 May 2008 – 1 July 2019
- Preceded by: Renato Brunetta
- Succeeded by: Sergio Berlato

Member of the Chamber of Deputies
- In office 28 April 2006 – 28 April 2008
- In office 1 June 2010 – 9 June 2010
- Incumbent
- Assumed office 13 October 2022

Personal details
- Born: 3 June 1956 (age 70) Padua, Italy
- Party: PS (1994); FI (2004–2009); PdL (2009–2013); FI (2013–2019); FdI (since 2019)
- Profession: Politician; Actress (1982–2004)

Elisabetta Gardini (3 June 1956) is an Italian politician and former actress.

== Biography ==
Born in Padua, Gardini was a popular TV presenter, stage and screen actress. Her best-known television appearances have included Unomattina (1985–1986), Europa, Europa (1988–1990), and the leading role of Laura Andrei in Una donna per amico (1998–2000).

=== Political career ===
Gardini was once close to Christian Democracy (DC) and after that party was dissolved into the Italian People's Party (PPI), she was an unsuccessful candidate for Segni Pact in the 1994 general election. In 2004 Gardini was appointed spokesperson of Forza Italia (FI), with which she was elected to the Regional Council of Veneto in 2005 and to the Chamber of Deputies in 2006. In 2008 she was the first of the non-elected candidates in the 2008 general election (Gardini entered in the Chamber of Deputies in July 2010, but resigned because she was MEP at that time).

On 30 May 2008, she entered the European Parliament, replacing Renato Brunetta, and after the 2009 election Gardini was elected for a full five-year term with The People of Freedom (PDL).

Gardini was once again re-elected in the 2014 election and was subsequently appointed leader of the new Forza Italia (formerly PDL) in the European Parliament, but in April 2019 Gardini left Silvio Berlusconi's FI to join Giorgia Meloni's Brothers of Italy (FdI) because "Antonio Tajani (the Vicepresident of Berlusconi's FI) transformed Forza Italia (FI) into the 'clone' of the Democratic Party (PD) and this is not acceptable for me". For this reason, Gardini left Tajani's European People's Party group (the group of FI) to join with Raffaele Fitto's Conservative group (ECR).

Gardini ran in the 2019 election as a candidate in North-East Italy, associated with ECR, of Brothers of Italy, led by Meloni where Fitto ran for the Southern Italy constituency. Gardini was not re-elected in the European election in May 2019 and her former seat was passed to Sergio Berlato.
