= Alessia Mosca =

Italian politician (born 1975)

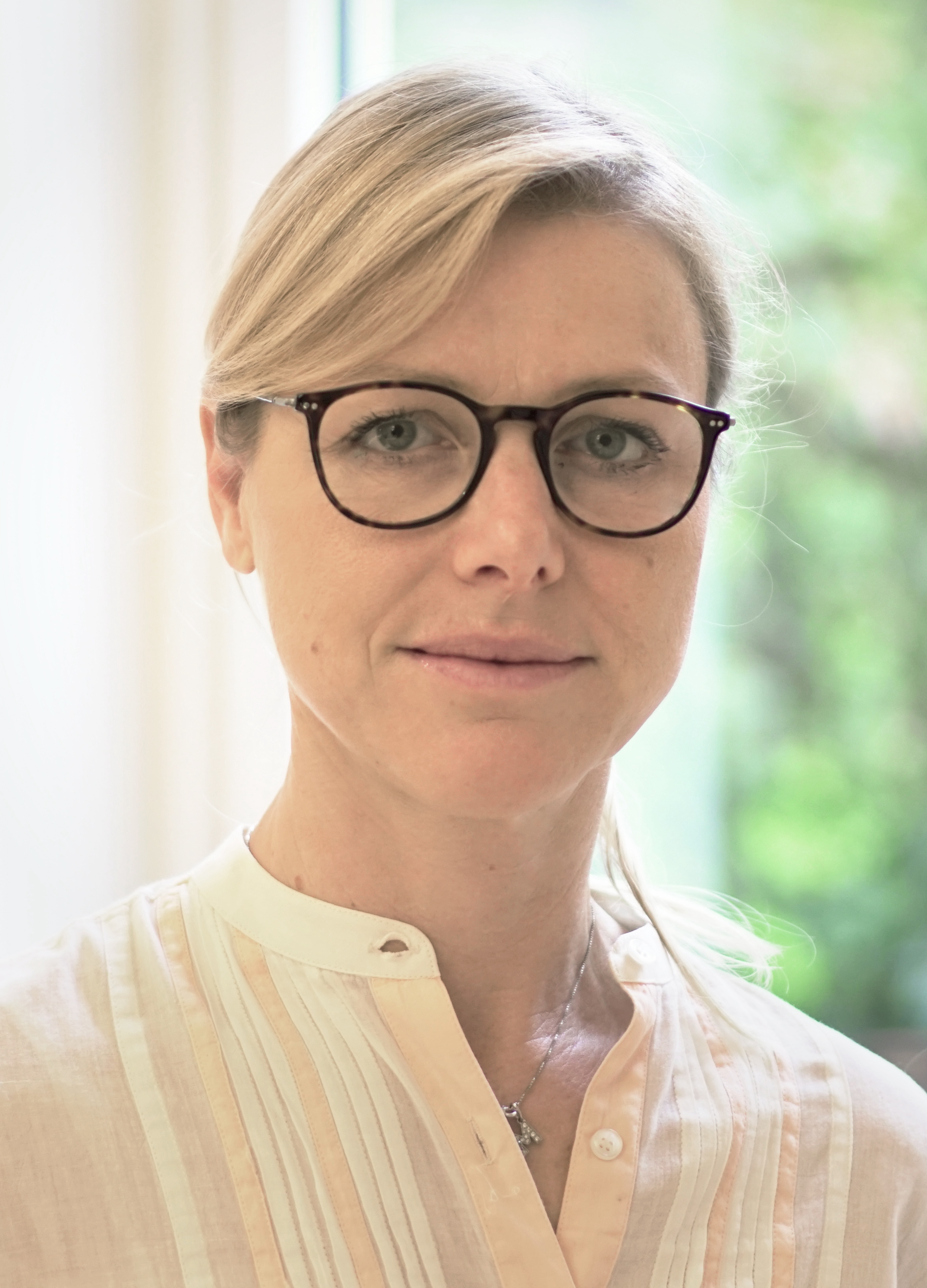

Member of the European Parliament
- In office 1 July 2014 – 2 July 2019
- Constituency: North-West Italy

Member of the Chamber of Deputies
- In office 29 April 2008 – 25 June 2014
- Constituency: Lombardy

Personal details
- Born: 23 May 1975 (age 51) Monza, Italy
- Party: Democratic Party
- Education: Università Cattolica del Sacro Cuore; Johns Hopkins University; University of Florence

Alessia Maria Mosca (born 23 May 1975) is the Secretary General of Italy-ASEAN association.

She is a former Italian politician who was a Member of the European Parliament (MEP) from 2014 to 2019 and a member of the Italian Chamber of Deputies from 2008 to 2014.

== Early life and education ==
Born in Monza, she holds a PhD in Political Science at the University of Florence. Alessia Mosca graduated in philosophy at the Università Cattolica del Sacro Cuore in Milan, completed the Master in Diplomacy at the Istituto per gli studi di politica internazionale and earned a master's degree in diplomacy at the Johns Hopkins University (American University based in Florence). She worked for the European Parliament and in Italy for Alenia Aeronautica.

While a member of the Italian Chamber of Deputies she signed the law that introduces in Italy gender quotas in the boards of listed companies. The so-called Golfo-Mosca law celebrates in 2021 its 10 years from entry into force.

Presently she is the Secretary General of Italy-ASEAN association - the Italian NGO that provides and build relationship between Italy and the members of ASEAN.

She is also vice President of Fuori Quota, an organisation that promotes the Golfo-Moca law enforcing the results achieved in the law's ten-year history.

Since 2017 she is adjunct professor at Sciences Po, Paris, where she teaches EU international trade.

At the beginning of 2021 she launched the association “Il Cielo Itinerante” with Ersilia Vaudo Scarpetta, Chief Diversity Officer for ESA, which aims to promote STEM studies among girls and young woman in Italy.

== Political career ==
Alessia Mosca was elected at the Italian parliament in 2008 and in 2013 with the Democratic Party.

In the 2014 European elections, Mosca was elected Member of the European Parliament with the same party. She served on the Committee on International Trade and as vice-chairwoman of the parliament's delegation for relations with the Arab Peninsula.

In addition to her committee assignments, Mosca was a member of the European Parliament Intergroup on Long-Term Investment and Reindustrialisation; the European Parliament Intergroup on Integrity (Transparency, Anti-Corruption and Organized Crime); the European Parliament Intergroup on LGBT Rights; the European Parliament Intergroup on Western Sahara; and the European Parliament Intergroup on Children's Rights.

On the Committee on International Trade, Mosca has served as rapporteur on the EU free trade agreements (FTA) with Vietnam and Mexico.

== Political positions ==
Following the 2014 elections, Mosca joined fellow MEPs Sven Giegold, Sylvie Goulard, Sophie in ’t Veld and Othmar Karas in an open letter aimed at exerting pressure on the President of the European Commission and national government leaders during the nominations process to improve the gender balance in the composition of the European Commission.

== National and international recognition ==
Her long standing work on gender equality issues, brought her to be recognized as a prominent figure in shaping the path for the empowerment of women in leadership positions, both in her home country and abroad.

== Other activities and recognitions ==
- Agenzia di ricerche e legislazione (AREL), Member of the Board
- European Council on Foreign Relations (ECFR), Member
- Fondazione Culturale Fonderia dei Talenti, President
- Young Global Leader (WEF), 2009
- Rising Talent (Women's Forum for the Economy and Society)
- World of difference award - The International Alliance for Women
