= Toni Cancian =

Italian politician

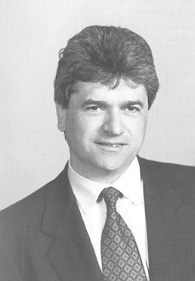
Antonio Cancian

Antonio "Toni" Cancian (Mareno di Piave, 2 July 1951) is an Italian politician and entrepreneur from Veneto.

A long-time Christian Democrat active in local government, Cancian was elected to the Italian Chamber of Deputies in the 1992 general election. After 15 years out of active politics, he stood in the 2009 European Parliament election for The People of Freedom and was elected with over 50,000 preference votes. In 2013 he joined the New Centre-Right party and in the 2014 European Parliament election he was not re-elected.
