= I Love Italy =

Italian political party

I Love Italy Io amo l'Italia
- Leader: Magdi Cristiano Allam
- Founded: 30 November 2008
- Dissolved: 2014
- Merged into: Brothers of Italy
- Ideology: Christian right Social conservatism Euroscepticism
- Political position: Right-wing
- European affiliation: EPP (2009–11); EFD (2011–14)

Party flag
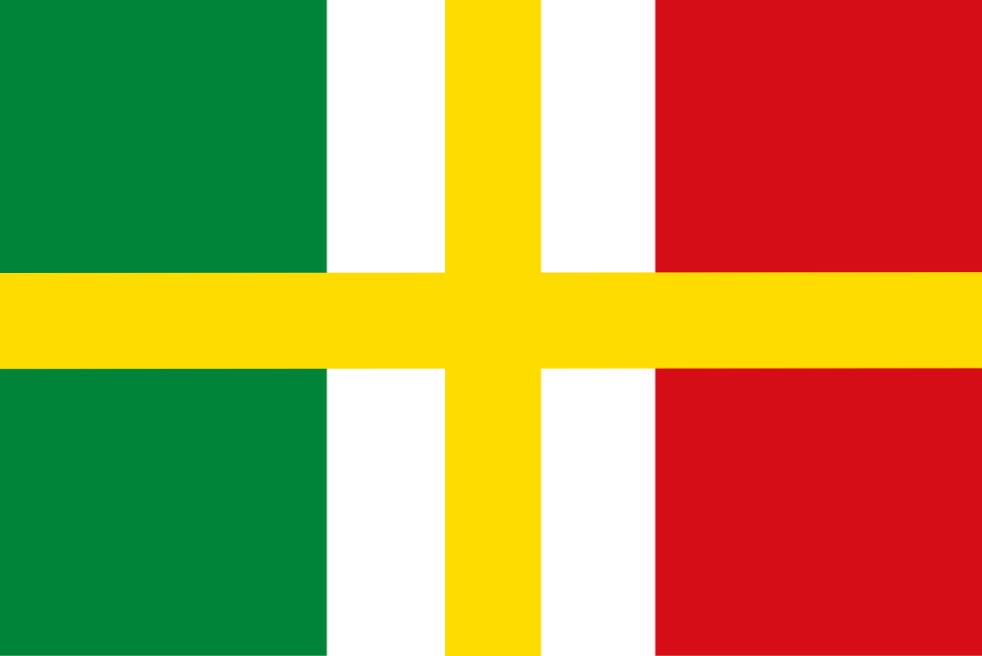

Website
- www.magdicristianoallam.it

I Love Italy (Italian: Io amo l'Italia, ALI), originally Protagonists for Christian Europe (Protagonisti per l'Europa cristiana), was a Christian-democratic, national-conservative and Eurosceptic political party in Italy. Its leader and founder was Magdi Allam.

== History and overview ==
The party was founded on 30 November 2008 by Egyptian-born journalist Magdi Allam, who is a Catholic convert from Islam. According to Allam, ALI is a secular party supporting the Abrahamic roots of Europe and that is why the party is open also to Muslims who acknowledge these roots, which are synthesized in the three slogans of the party: "Truth and Freedom", "Faith and Reason", "Values and Rules". The party participated in the 2009 European Parliament election in list with the Union of the Centre, representing the internal right-wing of the UdC, and Allam was elected MEP.

The party was socially conservative and, in its program, supported: human rights, bans on abortions, freedom and in particular religious freedom, the centrality of the family, democracy, economic liberalism, solidarity, subsidiarity, meritocracy and stewardship.

The symbol of the party (an Italian flag with a yellow cross) has been drawn by the political cartoonist Giorgio Forattini.

In late 2011 ALI was joined by two regional splinter groups of Lega Nord, who became associate parties: the Community Democratic League in Veneto and Tuscan Identity in Tuscany. At the same time, Magdi Allam left the Group of the European People's Party (EPP) and joined Lega Nord's group, Europe of Freedom and Democracy (EFD). Behind this decision, there were Allam's opposition to abortion and to the membership of the Turkish Justice and Development Party.

In 2013 I Love Italy joined to the political initiative "Workshop for Italy" (Officina per l'Italia) and in 2014 it became an associate party of Brothers of Italy.
