= Angelo Alessandri =

Italian politician (born 1969)

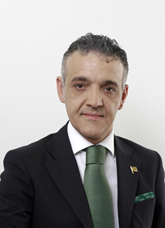

Member of the Chamber of Deputies
- In office 28 April 2006 – 14 March 2013

Personal details
- Born: 29 September 1969 (age 56) Reggio Emilia, Italy
- Party: Northern League (until 2012); I Change (2013–2014); Great North (since 2017)
- Profession: Politician, artisan

Angelo Alessandri (born 29 September 1969 in Reggio Emilia) is an Italian politician. He has been the leader of the Northern League Emilia and federal president of the Northern League (from 2005 to 2012).

He was elected to the Italian Chamber of Deputies in 2006 and 2008.

In 2012 he resigned from Northern League, in contrast to the "new course" undertaken by the Secretary Roberto Maroni.

On 18 December 2013 he presented the new I Change party, of which he became national president.
