= Luciano Gallino =

Italian sociologist (1927–2015)

- Born: 15 May 1927; Turin, Italy
- Died: 8 November 2015 (aged 88); Turin, Italy
- Occupation: Sociologist

Luciano Gallino (15 May 1927 – 8 November 2015) was an Italian sociologist.

Born in Turin, between 1956 and 1971 he worked in the Research Department of Social Relations of Olivetti. He was instrumental in introducing Sociology into Italian universities, at a time when both spiritualist and Communist scholars regarded the discipline as largely irrelevant.

From 1971 to 2002 he taught sociology at the University of Turin. He was also President of the Italian Council of Social Sciences from 1979 to 1988, and President of the Italian Association of Sociology from 1987 to 1992.

Gallino was the author of several books and a columnist for various publications, and he directed the magazine Quaderni di Sociologia. His studies mainly focused on the sociology of economic processes in the labour market. He cooperated with Romano Prodi when the latter served as Prime Minister of Italy.
