= Ignazio Messina =

Italian lawyer and politician

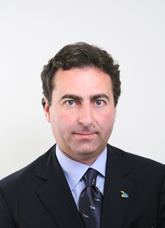

Member of the Chamber of Deputies
- In office 29 April 2008 – 14 March 2013

Personal details
- Born: 24 July 1964 (age 62) Palermo, Italy
- Party: Rete (1991–1998); IdV (since 1998)
- Education: University of Palermo
- Profession: Politician, lawyer

Ignazio Messina (born 24 July 1964) is an Italian lawyer and politician. He is the current leader of Italy of Values.

== Biography ==
Ignazio Messina was born in Palermo on 24 July 1964, from a family of magistrates and University professors. In 1991, he was one of the founders of The Network, a political party led by Leoluca Orlando, and was a candidate in the Sicilian regional election, without being elected. In 1993, he was elected Major of Sciacca and was confirmed again in 1997. In 1998, he joined Italy of Values, a party led by the former magistrate Antonio Di Pietro. In 1999, his mandate as Mayor was interrupted by a motion of distrust approved by the City Council; Leoluca Orlando held a meeting to defend Messina and accused the city councillors of collusion with the mafia: for that event Orlando was condemned, with a final sentence, for defamation.

In the general election of 2001, Messina was a candidate for the Chamber of Deputies, but he was not elected.

In 2004, he was again a candidate for Mayor of Sciacca, but did not win the election. In the general election of 2006, he was a candidate for the Senate, but he was not elected even on that occasion. Messina succeeded for the first time in being elected a parliamentary Deputy in the 2008 general election.

In 2013, he joined the political alliance Civil Revolution for the 2013 election, but RC did not reach the minimum threshold, and Messina lost his seat. In June 2013 he was elected National Secretary of the IdV replacing the outgoing leader Antonio Di Pietro.

In the 2018 general election Messina was a candidate for the Senate in the uninominal constituency of Brescia, supported by the centre-left coalition, but he was not elected.
