= Annalisa Corrado =

Italian politician (born 1973)

Annalisa Corrado MEP
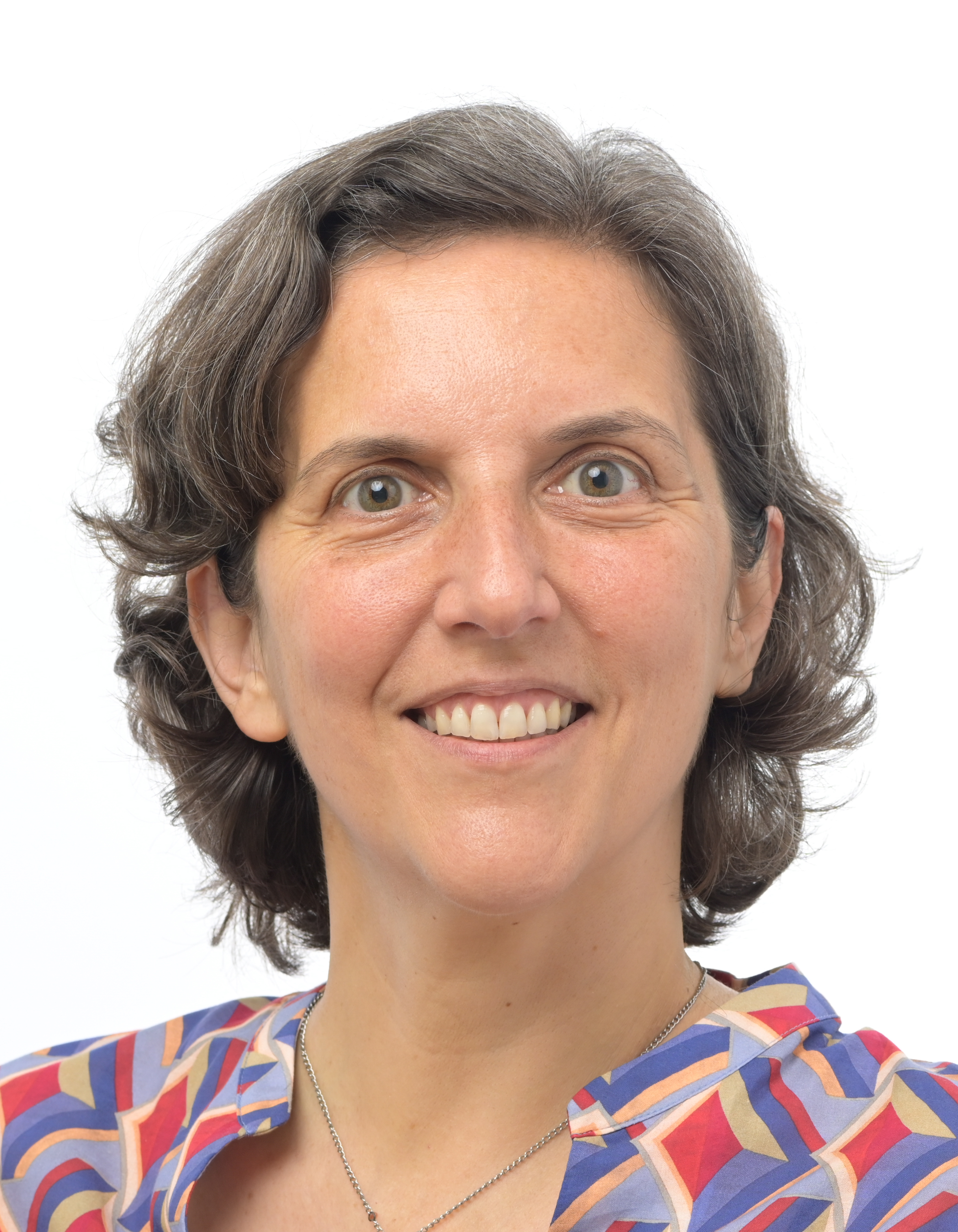

Member of the European Parliament for North-East Italy
- Incumbent
- Assumed office 16 July 2024

Personal details
- Born: 8 September 1973 (age 52) Civitavecchia, Italy
- Party: Democratic Party
- Other political affiliations: Party of European Socialists
- Education: Sapienza University of Rome

Annalisa Corrado (born 8 September 1973) is an Italian politician of the Democratic Party who was elected member of the European Parliament in 2024. She previously served as co-spokesperson of Green Italia.

== Early life and career ==
Corrado was born in Civitavecchia in 1973. She graduated from the Sapienza University of Rome with a degree in mechanical engineering and a PhD in energy, and later worked at the ministry of the environment. In the 2019 European Parliament election, she was the lead candidate of Green Europe in the Central Italy constituency.

On 1 October 2025, she was detained by Israel alongside three other Italian lawmakers while participating in the Global Sumud Flotilla which aimed to carry aid to the Gaza Strip; the group subsequently filed a criminal complaint with the Public Prosecutor's Office in Rome.
