= Tiziano Motti =

Italian musician and politician

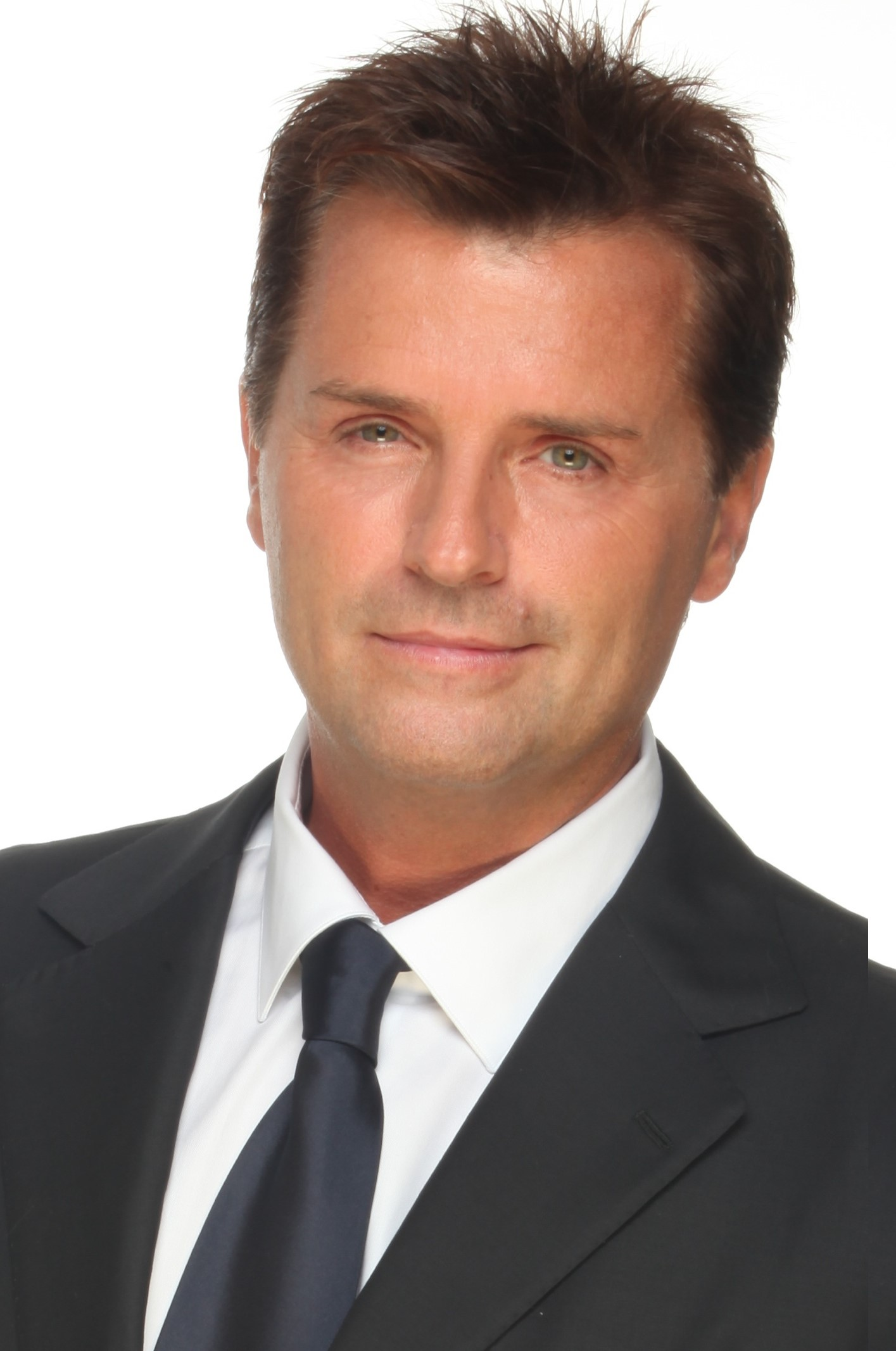
- Tiziano Motti in 2019
- Born: February 7, 1966 (age 60); Reggio Emilia, Italy
- Occupations: Musician; Politician
- Years active: 2006–present
- Website: http://tizianomotti.com

Tiziano Motti (born February 7, 1966) is an Italian musician and politician. He was a member of the European Parliament from 2009 to 2014. He represented the Union of Christian and Centre Democrats within the European People's Party group parliamentary group. He is well known for raising a variety of issues including child protection and animal rights.

== History ==
He was born in Reggio Emilia, Italy. In 2006, he founded Tiziano Motti Foundation. In 2009, he was elected as an independent member of the European Parliament. In 2010, he authored a resolution to help create a European Rapid Alert System against pedophiles. He raised and stood by various issues in support of animal rights.

== Career ==
Before joining politics in 2009, Motti worked as an entrepreneur in the publishing sector. In 2004, he founded a non-profit organization – "L'Europa dei diritti." He started from subordinate roles and founded "Citizen Guides" in the year 2000. In 2005, he founded the local newspaper "Il Giornale di Reggio". He produced the television format Noi Cittadini in collaboration with Italian actor, Antonio Lubrano and broadcast it, which based on citizens rights. In 2012, he started his musical career as an artist, DJ, and musician. Motti performed in a live concert organized for the victims of the May 2012 earthquake. In 2014, Motti released his album Siamo Tutti Assolti in March. The album comprised 12 tracks and two remix versions of La Verità. Siamo Tutti Assolti was launched by Universal Music Italia. Motti was a part of the Radio Bruno Estate tour in July 2014.
