= Marco Scurria =

Italian politician (born 1967)

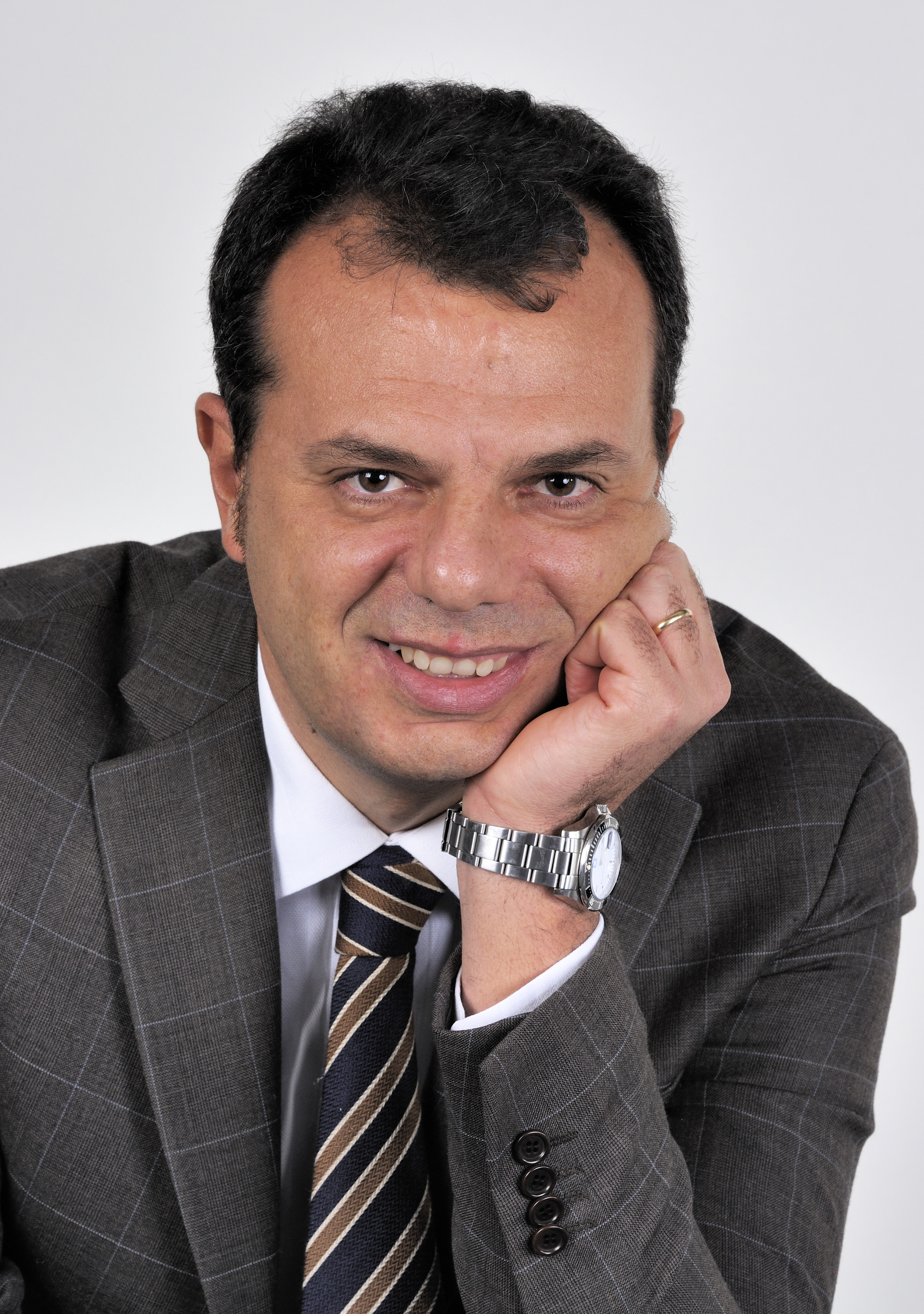
- Scurria in 2014

Member of the Senate of the Republic
- Incumbent
- Assumed office 13 October 2022
- Constituency: Lazio

Member of the European Parliament for Central Italy
- In office 14 July 2009 – 17 April 2014

Personal details
- Born: 18 May 1967 (age 58)
- Party: Brothers of Italy (2012–present)
- Other political affiliations: MSI (1994–1995); AN (1995–2009); PdL (2009–2012)

Marco Scurria (born 18 May 1967) is an Italian politician of Brothers of Italy who was elected member of the Senate of the Republic in 2022. From 2009 to 2014, he served as member of the European Parliament.
