= I Change =

I Change Io Cambio
- Secretary: Agostino D'Antuoni
- Founded: 2013
- Headquarters: via Cantore 3, Monza
- Ideology: Populism; Euroscepticism; Regionalism
- European Parliament group: EFD (2013–14)

I Change (Io Cambio, IC) is a political party in Italy.

== History ==
The party was formed in 2013 by Angelo Alessandri, former federal president of LN, national secretary of Lega Nord Emilia and member of the Chamber of Deputies, who had not supported the party's new course under Roberto Maroni. He was joined by other dissatisfied Lega members, like Claudio Morganti, MEP and former national secretary of Lega Nord Toscana, and Rosario Polizzi, a former deputy for National Alliance who had later joined I the South. IC was also supported by Giuseppe Guarino, a former Christian Democrat and minister.

For the 2014 European Parliament election the party presented joint lists along with the Associative Movement Italians Abroad, Women for Italy, minor groups and independents, notably including Davide Vannoni, inventor and promoter of the controversial stamina therapy.

In the election the party obtained a mere 0.2% of the vote, returning no MEPs.

== Leadership ==
- President: Angelo Alessandri
- Secretary: Agostino D'Antuoni
- Deputy Secretaries: William Carmagnola (North), Claudio Morganti (Centre), Rosario Polizzi (South)
