= Stamina therapy =

Controversial alternative medical treatment

The Stamina therapy (also known as the Stamina method or simply Stamina) was a controversial and unproven treatment promoted in Italy by Davide Vannoni between 2007 and 2014.

Primarily aimed at treating neurodegenerative diseases, the method was based on the purported conversion of mesenchymal stem cells into neurons. However, the details of the method were kept secret by its proponents, and Vannoni never published any scientific data supporting the method in peer-reviewed journals. In the absence of scientific validation, claims of its therapeutic efficacy remain unproven.

In response to public demonstrations in support of Stamina and intense media pressure, the Italian government authorized the use of the Stamina therapy in public hospitals in May 2013, despite strong objections from both the Italian and international scientific communities.

The experimental treatment was ultimately discontinued in October 2014. Davide Vannoni died in 2019, leaving no one to continue promoting the controversial treatment.

== Davide Vannoni ==
Davide Vannoni (1967–2019) was an associate professor at the University of Udine, where he taught in the communication program within the Department of Humanities.

In 2009, he founded the Stamina Foundation, a self-declared nonprofit organization, of which he served as president. He also owned a market research company.

In 2015, Vannoni was convicted on criminal charges related to the Stamina therapy and sentenced to five and a half years in prison.

He died on 10 December 2019, at the age of 52, after a long illness.

== Therapy ==
The proposed method involved converting mesenchymal stem cells—normally destined to become bone or adipose tissue—into neurons through brief exposure to retinoic acid diluted in ethanol. The procedure consisted of extracting cells from the patient's bone marrow, exposing them in vitro to an 18 micromolar solution of retinoic acid for two hours, and subsequently reinfusing them into the same patient.

Davide Vannoni, the method's creator, repeatedly declined to disclose technical details beyond what was included in a patent application.

=== Supposed effectiveness ===
Vannoni never provided scientific evidence to support the method’s efficacy but consistently claimed its benefits. These claims were promoted through multiple videos, often self-produced, and frequently aired on television—many of which featured children.

According to investigations conducted by the Public Prosecutor's Office of Turin, the improvements shown in these videos lacked objective or scientific verification. They were attributed either to exaggerated claims, concurrent adjuvant therapies, or normal physical development unrelated to the treatment.

== History ==
Davide Vannoni claimed that the origin of the Stamina project stemmed from personal experience: in 2007, he was hospitalized in Ukraine for a case of facial palsy and underwent a stem cell transplant, which he said led to partial health improvement. He later decided to offer similar treatment in Italy, collaborating with two Ukrainian biologists, Vyacheslav Klimenko and Olena Shchegelska. The group initially operated from a laboratory in the basement of Vannoni’s company in Turin, before relocating to a beauty center in San Marino.

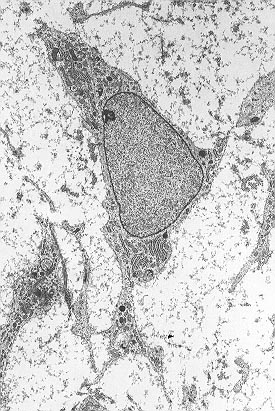
A mesenchymal stem cell

Between 2007 and 2009, the therapy was administered without oversight or approval from the Italian national health authorities. Promotional leaflets were distributed in hospitals, boasting “over a thousand cases treated,” recovery rates of “70–100%” (including 72 recoveries out of 90 strokes), and a wide range of diseases allegedly treated. Videos showcasing supposed miraculous recoveries were also circulated. During this period, 68 individuals—including three minors—underwent treatment, with 14 patients paying between €4,000 and €55,000.

In 2009, following an article in Corriere della Sera, magistrate Raffaele Guariniello opened an investigation to examine the legality of Vannoni's use of stem cells outside legally mandated experimental protocols. That same year, reports surfaced that Vannoni was offering unproven treatments for various neurodegenerative diseases, charging patients between €20,000 and €50,000. The methods used were poorly documented and sometimes harmful. The San Marino beauty center was also investigated for practicing unauthorized medical procedures.

While Klimenko and Shchegelska left Italy during the investigation, Vannoni and his associates continued administering therapies across several Italian cities—including Turin, Carmagnola, Trieste, Como, and eventually Brescia.

The case of Brescia marked a turning point: through pediatrician Marino Andolina—Vannoni’s collaborator and vice-president of the Stamina Foundation—the therapy was introduced as expanded access at the Civilian Hospitals of Brescia, the second-largest hospital in Italy. Several patients, including children with severe neurodegenerative diseases, received treatment.

In early 2012, inspections by the Carabinieri’s Anti-Adulteration Unit and the Italian Medicines Agency revealed numerous violations of hygiene and safety regulations. Essential legal documentation was missing, and the treatments lacked effective concentrations of mesenchymal stem cells. The cells were unable to differentiate into neurons and contained hazardous contaminants. Based on an analysis of the medical records of 36 patients, no clinical improvement was observed—except for three cases, judged solely on subjective assessments. Following these findings, the Stamina treatments at the Brescia hospital were suspended.

=== Media and political repercussions ===
The Stamina method gained widespread media attention after a February 2013 broadcast of the popular Italian television program Le Iene, which showed its use in children with various neurodegenerative diseases, including SMA type I. The program claimed that the infusion of stem cells led to significant improvements within a few weeks and suggested, without scientific evidence, that it could alter the fatal progression of these diseases. The show was widely accused of spreading scientific misinformation.

The Stamina case became both a media phenomenon and a scientific controversy, drawing criticism from institutions such as the Accademia dei Lincei, the journal Nature, and the European Medicines Agency. In May 2013, thirteen scientists published a critical analysis highlighting concerns about the inconsistency of scientific evidence, methodological shortcomings, and the lack of published data supporting the method.

Nobel laureate Shinya Yamanaka publicly expressed concern about the authorization of a treatment whose safety was unknown and efficacy unproven. Italian oncologist Umberto Veronesi compared the outcry over Stamina to the story of the Di Bella method, an ineffective cancer treatment that was administered outside established protocols.

Despite these criticisms, the Italian Government approved the start of a clinical trial of the method in May 2013, allocating 3 million Euros for 2013–2014 and identifying two healthcare facilities in Abruzzo and Sicily authorized to begin treatment. In August, Vannoni gave to the National Institute of Health the protocol of the method Stamina in order to start the experiment.

On 11 July 2013, the scientific journal Nature published an editorial urging the Italian government not to proceed with the experimentation, describing Vannoni as a "psychologist transformed into businessman doctor," and defining the Stamina therapy as based on false data and plagiarism.

Randy Schekman, another Nobel laureate, was cited by some pro-Stamina families as a supporter of the therapy; however, he had actually published criticisms of the editorial policies of major scientific journals and firmly denied any support of Stamina, calling Vannoni a quack and describing the case as a criminal operation.

=== Starting of experimentations ===
The protocols proposed the Stamina method as suitable for the treatment of X-linked bulbospinal neuropathy, cerebral palsy, and amyotrophic lateral sclerosis. However, surprisingly, the list of diseases eligible for treatment excluded SMA type I, which until then had been the most commonly treated pathology. The treatment of SMA patients became a primary focus of the television program Le Iene, which brought the Stamina method to the attention of the general public. For this condition, the inventors and supporters of Stamina claimed excellent efficacy, with the Stamina Foundation even arguing that SMA type I was the only disease for which "certified improvements" were documented. Vannoni stated that SMA type I was excluded because it was "too complex in attesting improvements".

In September, the Scientific Committee established by the Minister of Health, Beatrice Lorenzin, issued a negative consultative report, concluding that the method likely had low replicability. The report also highlighted a significant risk of transmitting diseases such as AIDS and BSE (mad cow disease). Following these findings, the Ministry of Health conducted its own study and, on 10 October, definitively rejected the Stamina therapy as "dangerous to the health of patients."

The Ministry’s report also stated that the doses of mesenchymal stem cells used in Vannoni’s protocol were minimal—“suitable for mice, not for humans.” Typically, stem cell transplantation in humans requires about two million cells per kilogram of body weight, whereas the Stamina protocol involved the transplantation of just two million cells in total, without accounting for the patient’s body weight. Furthermore, it was discovered that the protocol provided to the Civilian Hospitals of Brescia differed from the one submitted to the Ministry.

After Vannoni appealed in court against the commission responsible for human experimentation, accusing them of alleged partiality, a new scientific committee was appointed in December 2013. Ten months later, the committee of experts appointed by Minister of Health Beatrice Lorenzin unanimously rejected the Stamina method, concluding that there was no justification for initiating further scientific experimentation of the therapy.

Some tests were conducted outside of Italy; however, in none of these cases was the transformation of cells into neurons successfully achieved.

In January 2014, the medical staff of the Civilian Hospitals of Brescia officially announced that the Stamina therapy was no longer being administered at the facility, except in cases where its application had been mandated by court order.

== Patents ==
In December 2009, shortly after Klimenko and Shchegelska left the project, Vannoni filed four patent applications related to the Stamina therapy: two in Italy, one in Canada, and one in the United States. According to Enrica Molino, one of Vannoni’s collaborators, she was listed as the sole inventor on these applications. However, several elements included in the patent applications—such as images of stem cells—were reportedly taken from research published by Shchegelska in the Ukrainian Neurosurgical Journal in 2006. Despite this, Shchegelska was not credited in any of the patent filings.

After submitting the applications to various patent offices, Vannoni withdrew them before receiving any official responses. However, he was unable to withdraw the application from the United States Patent and Trademark Office (USPTO), which became the only source of accessible documentation. In 2012, the USPTO partially rejected the application through a procedure that allows for resubmission, but Vannoni never followed up with a revised submission.

The rejection was based on several issues: the application lacked sufficient methodological details, it claimed a cell differentiation process that was deemed implausible given the extremely short incubation time (between 40 minutes and 2 hours), and the observed morphology of the supposed nerve cells could have resulted from cytotoxic effects rather than genuine differentiation.

In essence, no official patent was ever granted for the Stamina method. Despite Vannoni's public claims, only a single, ultimately rejected, application to the U.S. patent office exists.

== Judicial cases ==
In February 2014, Vannoni was accused of attempted fraud against the Piedmont regional authorities after applying for a €500,000 loan to finance a stem cell laboratory that was never opened.

In April 2014, he and 20 other individuals were charged with criminal conspiracy, fraud, and the unauthorized trade and administration of hazardous medicines. Vannoni was also personally investigated for the unauthorized practice of medicine, defamation, and identity fraud.

In August 2014, a court in Turin ordered the cessation of Stamina's activities and the confiscation of its equipment. This action was supported by Professor Elena Cattaneo, a stem cell expert and member of the Italian Senate. The Senate exercised its authority to request documentation that had previously been withheld from other parties. The resulting inquiry led to several recommendations, including the proposal that scientific experts should be consulted in similar judicial cases.

In October 2014, the Medical Association of Trieste suspended Marino Andolina from practicing medicine. In June 2015, he was placed under house arrest and faced trial for allegedly exploiting vulnerable patients and administering unproven therapies in exchange for money. He was released in late 2016.

In the same year, Davide Vannoni was convicted on criminal charges related to the administration of an unproven treatment and was barred from practicing any medical profession in Italy.

== Controversies ==
Vannoni repeatedly claimed that the medical treatments provided through his method were offered “free of charge,” and that any money he received was in the form of voluntary “donations.” However, several former patients and relatives of patients alleged the existence of a fixed price list for treatments.

In July 2013, Vannoni registered the trademark Stamina. Around the same time, the Stamina Foundation signed a €2 million commercial agreement with Medestea Biotech, an Italian biotechnology company specializing in stem cell technology. The company was later accused of lobbying for the deregulation of stem cell treatments.

Further suspicions were fueled by Vannoni’s affluent lifestyle. He reportedly owned a Porsche 911 registered in Switzerland and resided in a luxury villa near Turin.

Later that year, Vannoni announced his intention to relocate abroad—along with his research team and a cooperative of patients’ families—to Cape Verde or another country outside Italy. He cited an alleged conspiracy involving pharmaceutical lobbies, bureaucracy, and political forces working to suppress Stamina therapy in Italy. He also claimed that three U.S. universities were interested in testing his method.
