= Europe of Freedom and Democracy =

Former far-right political group of the European Parliament

- European Parliament group
- Name: Europe of Freedom and Democracy
- English abbr.: EFD
- French abbr.: ELD
- Formal name: Europe of Freedom and Democracy Group
- Ideology: Euroscepticism; National conservatism; Conservatism; Right-wing populism; Nationalism; Anti-immigration
- Political position: Right-wing to far-right
- European parties: Movement for a Europe of Liberties and Democracy
- From: 1 July 2009 (de facto)
- To: 24 June 2014
- Preceded by: Independence/Democracy
- Succeeded by: Europe of Freedom and Direct Democracy
- Chaired by: Nigel Farage (UKIP); Francesco Speroni (LN)
- MEP(s): 34
- Website: efdgroup.eu (archived URL)

Europe of Freedom and Democracy (EFD) was a far-right, Eurosceptic political group that operated in the European Parliament from 2009 to 2014. It was composed of 34 MEPs and it existed during the European Parliament's 7th and 8th terms. After 2011, EFD had a loose relationship with the Movement for a Europe of Liberties and Democracy political party.

Ideologically, EFD was conservative, right-wing populist and strongly opposed to European integration. Its members included parties such as the UK Independence Party and Lega Nord. Founded as a merger of the Independence/Democracy (IND/DEM) and Union for Europe of the Nations after the 2009 European Parliament election, EFD was more nationalistic and strongly opposed to immigration than its main predecessor, IND/DEM. In the aftermath of the 2014 European Parliament election, EFD became the Europe of Freedom and Direct Democracy (EFDD) group, though only two EFD parties continued their membership in the EFDD.

== History ==
=== Formation ===
Following the 2009 European Parliament elections, the Independence/Democracy (IND/DEM) and Union for a Europe of Nations (UEN), two political groups of the European Parliament, were in trouble. The UK Independence Party (UKIP) component of IND/DEM had done well, but the other parties of this group fared very poorly. UEN had also lost MEPs and both groups had fallen below the threshold required for a group to exist. The remnants of both groups needed to find a new group before the constitutive session of the 7th European Parliament on 14 July 2009.

Speculation regarding the new group surfaced on 30 June 2009. The name of the group was originally speculated as A Europe of Free Peoples, or A Europe of Peoples for Liberty, or a phrase involving the word Independence or Freedom or Democracy or People. In the absence of an official name, the nascent group was given the placeholder name of Liberty. On 1 July 2009 a press conference was held launching the group. That press conference named the group Europe of Freedom and Democracy.

Andreas Mölzer, the leader of the Freedom Party of Austria (FPÖ) European Parliament list, announced in July 2009 that FPÖ and EFD were in negotiations over FPÖ joining the group; each side had reservations about the other, with UKIP, the Reformed Political Party (SGP) of the Netherlands, and the Slovak National Party (SNS) each uneasy about the inclusion of the FPÖ. In June 2011, the FPÖ tried again to have its two MEPs join the faction, but was again denied, being opposed by five or six of the nine parties in the EFD. EFD was positioned by scholars as a right-wing and far-right.

=== Defections ===
In March 2010 it was announced that MEP Nikki Sinclaire had had the UKIP whip withdrawn. Sinclaire had refused to join the EFD on the grounds that it was a grouping with "extreme views" and consequently had not sat with her UKIP colleagues in the European parliament. In June 2010 MEP Mike Nattrass also left the EFD, albeit on other grounds than Sinclaire, stating that "I don't share the same principles of some of the Group, on balance, the majority of the Group want to stay in the EU and I've always believed that we should leave." Nattrass later rejoined the group in December 2012. In March 2011 MEP Trevor Colman left the EFD, allegedly due to an "unresolved dispute over financial and staffing issues." However Colman continued to represent UKIP as a Non-Attached MEP. On 24 May 2011, British MEP David Campbell Bannerman defected to the Conservative Party, and the European Conservatives and Reformists (ECR) group.

In March 2011, Danish MEP Anna Rosbach left the EFD, and in turn joined the ECR group as an independent.

The EFD was joined by Belgian MEP Frank Vanhecke in November 2011, after Vanhecke left Flemish Interest (VB). It was joined by Magdi Allam in December 2011, when Allam defected from the Union of Christian and Centre Democrats (UDC) in the EPP group. The four MEPs from United Poland defected from the ECR group on 26 December 2011, taking the group's numbers to 33. In March 2012 Roger Helmer who was elected as a British Conservative Party MEP and previously sat with the ECR group, defected to UKIP and the EFD, raising the group's numbers to 34.

In late 2012, Slavcho Binev MEP of People for Real, Open and United Democracy (PROUD) joined the group.

In February 2013 Marta Andreasen announced she was leaving UKIP and defected to the Conservative Party.

In late September 2013, National Front for the Salvation of Bulgaria (NSFB) joined the group.

== Composition ==
EU states with one EFD MEP (shown in light orange), EU states with more than one EFD MEPs (shown in dark orange) during the 7th European Parliament

Europe of Freedom and Democracy had 34 elected members between 2009 and 2014, they are as follows:

| Country | Name | | Ideology | Previous membership | MEPs |
|---|---|---|---|---|---|
| United Kingdom | UK Independence Party | UKIP | Right-wing populism British nationalism | Independence/Democracy | 10 / 736 |
| Italy | Northern League | Lega | Nationalism; Right-wing populism | Union for Europe of the Nations | 9 / 736 |
| Poland | United Poland | SP | National conservatism Catholic nationalism | European Conservatives and Reformists | 4 / 736 |
| Lithuania | Order and Justice | TT | National conservatism Right-wing populism | Union for Europe of the Nations | 2 / 736 |
| Greece | Popular Orthodox Rally | LAOS | Religious conservatism Right-wing populism | Independence/Democracy | 2 / 736 |
| Bulgaria | National Front for the Salvation of Bulgaria | NFSB | Ultranationalism; Euroscepticism | Non-Inscrits | 1 / 736 |
| Denmark | Danish People's Party | DF | Danish nationalism Right-wing populism | Non-Inscrits | 1 / 736 |
| Finland | Finns Party | | National conservatism Right-wing populism | None | 1 / 736 |
| France | Movement for France | MPF | National conservatism French nationalism | Independence/Democracy | 1 / 736 |
| Italy | I Love Italy | ALI | Christian democracy Euroscepticism | European People's Party | 1 / 736 |
| Netherlands | Reformed Political Party | SGP | Christian right Social conservatism | Independence/Democracy | 1 / 736 |
| Slovakia | Slovak National Party | SNS | Ultranationalism; Right-wing populism | None | 1 / 736 |
| Belgium | Frank Vanhecke (Ind.) | | – | Non-Inscrits | 1 / 736 |

== Leadership ==
- Co-president: Nigel Farage (2009–2014)
- Co-president: Francesco Speroni (2009–2014)
