= European Choice =

European Choice Scelta Europea
- Leaders: Michele Boldrin; Bruno Tabacci; Stefania Giannini
- Founded: 4 March 2014
- Ideology: Liberalism
- Political position: Centre
- European affiliation: ALDE
- European Parliament group: No MEPs
- European Parliament: 0 / 73

Website
- www.sceltaeuropea.it

European Choice (Italian: Scelta Europea, SE) was a pro-European and primarily liberal electoral alliance of political parties in Italy formed to contest the 2014 European election on a platform influenced heavily by the Belgian MEP Guy Verhofstadt.

== History ==
The list was supported by Civic Choice (SC), Democratic Centre (CD), Act to Stop the Decline (FFD), the Italian Liberal Party (PLI), the Italian Republican Party (PRI), the Liberal Democratic Alliance for Italy (ALI), the Conservatives and Social Reformers (CSR), the European Federalist Party (PFE) and miscellaneous minor movements.

In early March 2014 the list received support from Guy Verhofstadt, former Prime Minister of Belgium and candidate of the Alliance of Liberals and Democrats for Europe (ALDE) and the European Democratic Party for President of the European Commission, and the endorsement of Romano Prodi, former Prime Minister of Italy, former President of the European Commission and former president of the Democratic Party. Later, on 19 March, CD, FFD and other groups agreed to go forward with the creation of the list without SC whose members criticised the deal and Verhofstadt himself. In particular, senator Pietro Ichino explained that his party could not be part of a grouping so heterogeneous to include groups as diverse as the Conservatives and Social Reformers, whose MEP Cristiana Muscardini, a "nationalist", sat in the European Conservatives and Reformists Group, or MEP Sonia Alfano, a left-winger who had previously tried to join The Other Europe, a "far-left" anti-austerity list. However, the list went ahead with the participation of SC (as originally planned) and the exclusion of Italy of Values, the main Italian member of the ALDE Party, and controversial candidates, including Muscardini and Alfano.

In the election SE received 0.7% of the vote, being stronger in the South (CD's heartland), and failed to return any MEPs.

== Composition ==
Party	Main ideology	Leader
Civic Choice (SC)	Liberalism	Stefania Giannini
Democratic Centre (CD)	Centrism	Bruno Tabacci
Act to Stop the Decline (FFD)	Economic liberalism	Michele Boldrin
Conservatives and Social Reformers (CSR)	Conservatism	Cristiana Muscardini
Italian Liberal Party (PLI)	Liberalism	Enzo Palumbo
Italian Republican Party (PRI)	Social liberalism	Francesco Nucara
The Liberals	Liberalism	Edoardo Croci
Federation of Liberals (FdL)	Liberalism	Raffaello Morelli
Liberal Democratic Alliance for Italy (ALI)	Liberism	Silvia Enrico

== Electoral results ==
=== European Parliament ===
Election year	# of overall votes	% of overall vote	# of overall seats won	+/–	Leader
2014	197,942 (#9)	0.72	0 / 73	–	Bruno Tabacci
