= European Greens – Green Italia =

European Greens – Green Italy Verdi Europei - Green Italia
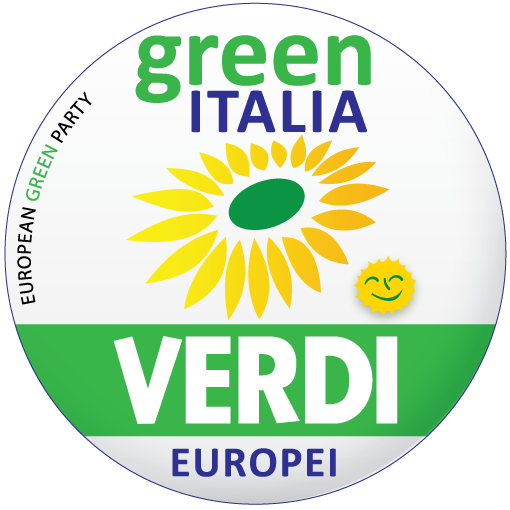
- Leaders: Monica Frassoni; Angelo Bonelli
- Founded: 2 April 2014
- Succeeded by: Green Europe
- Ideology: Green politics
- European affiliation: European Green Party
- European Parliament: 0 / 73

European Greens – Green Italy (Italian: Verdi Europei – Green Italia) was a political alliance in Italy between the Federation of the Greens and Green Italia, constituted for the 2014 European election.

The list was initially excluded because it had not collected the 30,000 signatures necessary for candidacy in each of the five Italian districts. The list was subsequently readmitted to the electoral competition following a provision of the Court of Cassation that recognized the exemption from the obligation to collect signatures, as the list was already an expression of the present European Green Party in the European Parliament.

The list finally got 0.9% of the vote and no seats in the European Parliament. However, it came fifth with 6.0% among Italians abroad, with particularly good results in Austria (12.2%), Spain (8.8%), and France (7.5%).
