= New Centre-Right – Union of the Centre =

New Centre-Right – Union of the Centre Nuovo Centrodestra – Unione di Centro
- Abbreviation: NCD-UDC
- Leaders: Angelino Alfano; Pier Ferdinando Casini
- Founded: 6 April 2014
- Dissolved: 26 May 2014
- Succeeded by: Popular Area
- Ideology: Christian democracy Conservatism
- Political position: Centre-right
- European affiliation: European People's Party (UdC)

Website
- www.nuovocentrodestra.it www.udc-italia.it

New Centre-Right – Union of the Centre (Italian: Nuovo Centrodestra – Unione di Centro, NCD-UDC), was a centre-right political alliance in Italy, for the 2014 European election. NCD-UDC supports Jean-Claude Juncker, the candidate of the European People's Party for the European Commission presidency.

== Overview ==
The alliance was formed on 6 April 2014, and it is composed by the following parties:

Party	Ideology	Leader
New Centre-Right (NCD)	Conservatism	Angelino Alfano
Union of the Centre (UdC)	Christian democracy	Pier Ferdinando Casini
Populars for Italy (PpI)	Christian democracy	Mario Mauro

== Electoral results ==
=== European Parliament ===
Election year	# of overall votes	% of overall vote	# of overall seats won	+/–	Leader
2014	1,202,350 (#5)	4.38	3 / 73	–	Angelino Alfano
