= The Other Europe =

The Other Europe L'Altra Europa
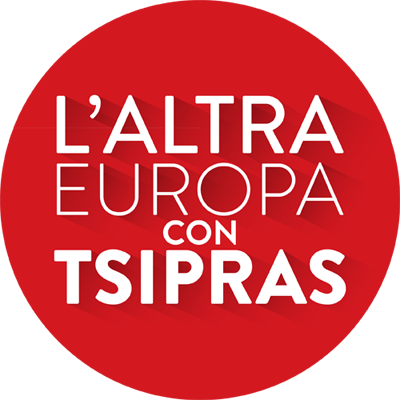
- Chairman: Massimo Torelli
- Founded: 5 March 2014
- Dissolved: 14 September 2019
- Merged into: The Left
- Ideology: Democratic socialism Eco-socialism
- Political position: Left-wing
- European affiliation: Party of the European Left (observer)
- European Parliament group: GUE/NGL
- Colours: Red

Website
- listatsipras.eu

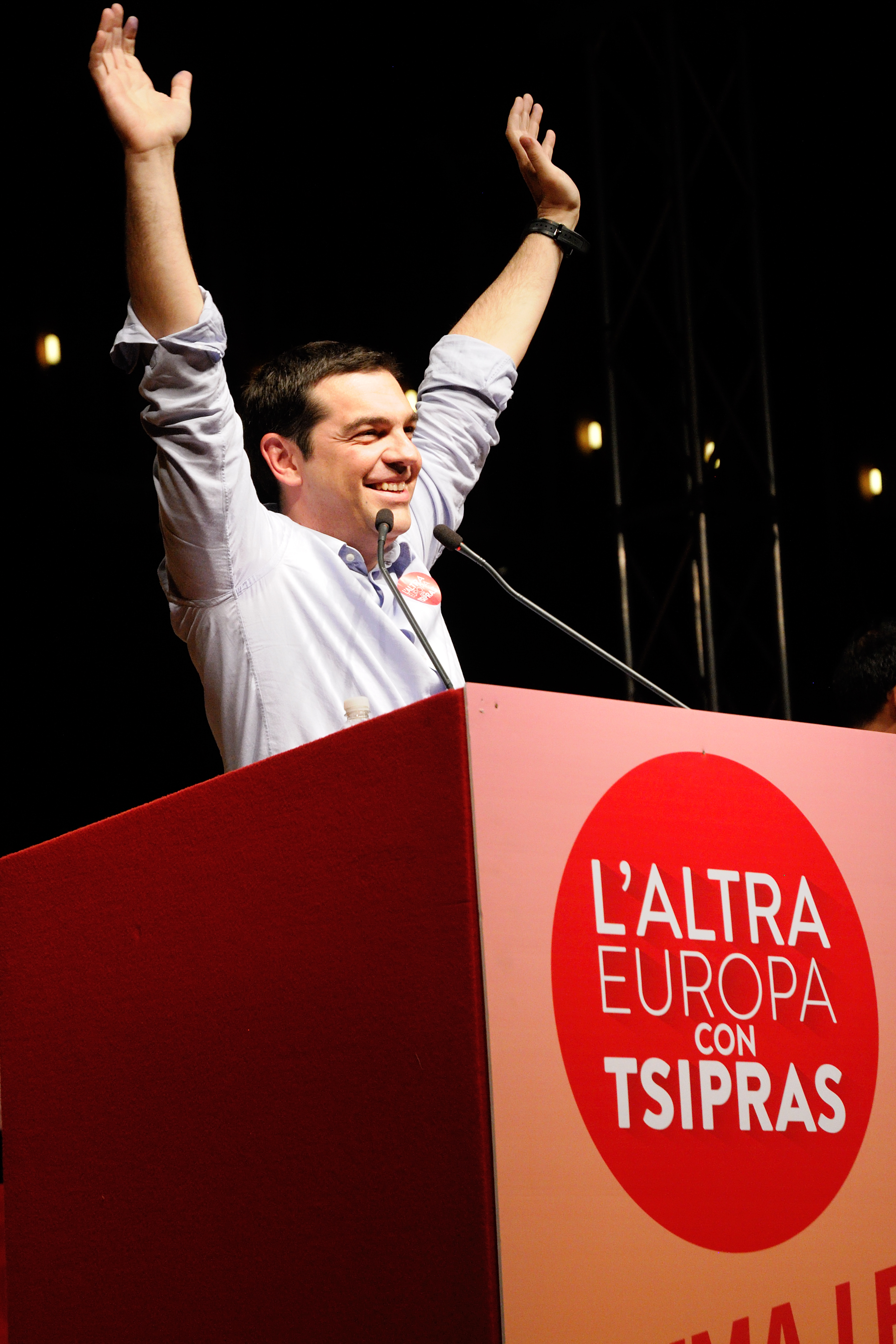
Alexis Tsipras speaks during The Other Europe rally in Bologna

The Other Europe (Italian: L'Altra Europa), whose full name was The Other Europe with Tsipras (L'Altra Europa con Tsipras, AET), was a left-wing political organisation in Italy. It took part in the 2014 European Parliament election in support of Alexis Tsipras, the candidate of the Party of the European Left for President of the European Commission.

== History ==
In the 2014 EP election the list obtained 4.0% of the vote, just above the 4% threshold, and 3 elects to the European Parliament: Eleonora Forenza (Communist Refoundation Party), Curzio Maltese (independent, later Left Ecology Freedom) and Barbara Spinelli (independent). After the election, they joined the European United Left–Nordic Green Left (GUE/NGL) Group. In May 2015 Spinelli left AET, becoming an independent MEP within GUE/NGL.

In July 2015 two senators, Fabrizio Bocchino and Francesco Campanella, elected in the 2013 general election with the Five Star Movement and later founding members of the short-lived Italy Work in Progress party, launched a sub-group named "The Other Europe with Tsipras" within the Mixed Group of the Senate. In March 2016 the sub-group was folded into Italian Left, which had been launched primarily by Left Ecology Freedom and dissidents of the Democratic Party.

== Composition ==
AET was founded on 5 March 2014 in Rome by some Italian intellectuals, Andrea Camilleri, Paolo Flores d'Arcais, Luciano Gallino, Marco Revelli, Barbara Spinelli and Guido Viale. The alliance was then composed of the following parties:

Party	Main ideology	Leader
Left Ecology Freedom (SEL)	Democratic socialism	Nichi Vendola
Communist Refoundation Party (PRC)	Communism	Maurizio Acerbo
Greens of South Tyrol	Green politics	Giorgio Zanvettor
Civil Action (AC)	Anti-corruption policies	Antonio Ingroia
Italian Pirate Party (PPIT)	Pirate policies	Luca Cappelletti
Independence Republic of Sardinia (IRS)	Sardinian nationalism	Gavino Sale

== Leadership ==
=== Coordinator ===
- Massimo Torelli (05/03/2014–14/09/2019)

=== Advisory Committee ===
- Marco Revelli (01/02/2014–14/09/2019)
- Argyris Panagopoulos, in name of Alexis Tsipras (08/02/2014–14/09/2019)
- Massimo Torelli (01/02/2014–14/09/2019)
- Andrea Camilleri (01/02/2014–11/03/2014)
- Paolo Flores d'Arcais (01/02/2014–11/03/2014)
- Luciano Gallino (01/02/2014–08/11/2015)
- Barbara Spinelli (01/02/2014–15/05/2015)
- Guido Viale (01/02/2014–18/03/2015)

== Electoral results ==
=== European Parliament ===
Election	Leader	Votes	%	Seats	+/–	EP Group
2014	Several	1,108,457 (6th)	4.03	3 / 73	New	GUE/NGL
2019	Massimo Torelli	Into LS		0 / 76	▼3	–

=== Regional Councils ===
Region	Election year	Votes	%	Seats	+/−
Piedmont	2014	19,467 (11th)	1.0	0 / 50	–
Trentino	2018	2,101 (18th)	0.8	0 / 35	–
Veneto	2015	44,676 (15th)	0.8	0 / 51	–
Liguria	2015	3,937 (12th)	0.7	0 / 31	–
Marche	2015	20,266 (8th)	3.8	0 / 31	–
Umbria	2015	5,561 (11th)	1.6	0 / 20	–
Apulia	2015	14,513 (11th)	0.9	0 / 51	–
Calabria	2014	10,062 (13th)	1.3	0 / 30	–
