= Associative Movement of Italians Abroad =

Associative Movement of Italians Abroad Movimento Associativo Italiani all'Estero
- Leader: Ricardo Antonio Merlo
- Founded: 8 March 2008; 18 years ago
- Split from: Italian Associations in South America
- Ideology: Interests of Italians abroad
- Political position: Centre
- National affiliation: Civics of Italy (2022–)
- International affiliation: Centrist Democrat International
- Colours: Dark Blue
- Chamber of Deputies: 1 / 400
- Senate: 1 / 205
- European Parliament: 0 / 76

Website
- maiemondiale.com

The Associative Movement of Italians Abroad (Italian: Movimento Associativo Italiani all'Estero, MAIE) is an Italian political party representing Italians abroad. Based in Argentina and active mainly in South America, the MAIE is a centrist party.

== History ==
The party emerged from the split of the liberal wing of the Italian Associations in South America (AISA) in 2008.

In the 2008 general election, the MAIE won one seat in the Chamber of Deputies for Ricardo Antonio Merlo (elected to the Chamber for AISA in 2006), and a one seat in the Senate for Mirella Giai, a former member and candidate of the Democrats of the Left (DS). Both Merlo and Giai joined forces with centrist and centre-right groups, notably including the Liberal Democrats (LD), with whom the MAIE formed a joint electoral list for the 2009 European Parliament election, and the Union of the Centre (UdC). Giai was a member of For the Autonomies group, along with the UdC, for the entire parliamentary term.

In the 2013 general election, the party elected three deputies (two, Merlo and Mario Borghese, in its own lists and a third, Fucsia Nissoli, in With Monti for Italy's list for North America) and one senator (Claudio Zin). After the election, Nissoli left, while another deputy (Renata Bueno, elected with the South American Union Italian Emigrants, USEI) joined forces for two years. During the parliamentary term, MAIE deputies formed an alliance with the Alliance for Italy (ApI) from 2013 to 2015 and with Liberal Popular Alliance since 2015, while senator Zin was a member of For the Autonomies. For the 2014 European Parliament election the MAIE formed a joint electoral list with I Change (IC), a split from Lega Nord (LN).

In the 2018 general election, the party elected one deputy (Borghese) and one senator (Merlo). A senator from the rival USEI, Adriano Cario, joined MAIE in May 2018. In December 2021 Cario's election was annulled.

== Electoral results ==
=== Italian Parliament ===
Chamber of Deputies – Italians abroad
Election year	# of overall votes	% of overall vote	% in South America	# of overall seats	# of seats for Italians abroad	±
2008	86,970	8.3	22.7	1 / 630	1 / 12	▲1
2013	140,868	14.3	39.4	2 / 630	2 / 12	▲1
2018	104,538	9.7	27.8	1 / 630	1 / 12	▼1
2022	141,440	13.0	33.8	1 / 400	1 / 8	0

Senate – Italians abroad
Election year	# of overall votes	% of overall vote	% in South America	# of overall seats	# of seats for Italians abroad	±
2008	72,511	7.6	20.8	1 / 315	1 / 6	▲1
2013	120,290	13.4	40.9	1 / 315	1 / 6	0
2018	107,879	10.9	31.6	1 / 315	1 / 6	0
2022	138,337	12.7	32.5	1 / 200	1 / 4	0
