= List of members of the European Parliament for Italy, 2014–2019 =

Members of the European Parliament for Italy
ECSC delegation	(1952)
EP delegation	(1958)
1st term	(1979)
2nd term	(1984)
3rd term	(1989)
4th term	(1994)
5th term	(1999)
6th term	(2004)
7th term	(2009)
8th term	(2014)
9th term	(2019)
10th term	(2024)

This is a list of the 73 members of the European Parliament for Italy in the 2014 to 2019 session.

== List ==
Name	National party	EP Group
Brando Benifei	Democratic Party	S&D
Goffredo Bettini	Democratic Party	S&D
Simona Bonafé	Democratic Party	S&D
Mercedes Bresso	Democratic Party	S&D
Renata Briano	Democratic Party	S&D
Nicola Caputo	Democratic Party	S&D
Caterina Chinnici	Democratic Party	S&D
Sergio Cofferati	Democratic Party	S&D
Silvia Costa	Democratic Party	S&D
Andrea Cozzolino	Democratic Party	S&D
Nicola Danti	Democratic Party	S&D
Paolo De Castro	Democratic Party	S&D
Isabella De Monte	Democratic Party	S&D
Gianni Pittella (until March 22, 2018) Giuseppe Ferrandino (from 17 April 2018)	Democratic Party	S&D
Enrico Gasbarra	Democratic Party	S&D
Elena Gentile	Democratic Party	S&D
Michela Giuffrida	Democratic Party	S&D
Roberto Gualtieri	Democratic Party	S&D
Cécile Kyenge	Democratic Party	S&D
Luigi Morgano	Democratic Party	S&D
Alessia Mosca	Democratic Party	S&D
Massimo Paolucci	Democratic Party	S&D
Antonio Panzeri	Democratic Party	S&D
Pina Picierno	Democratic Party	S&D
David Sassoli	Democratic Party	S&D
Elly Schlein	Democratic Party	S&D
Renato Soru	Democratic Party	S&D
Patrizia Toia	Democratic Party	S&D
Daniele Viotti	Democratic Party	S&D
Flavio Zanonato	Democratic Party	S&D
Alessandra Moretti (until 1 February 2015) Damiano Zoffoli (from 18 February 2015)	Democratic Party	S&D
Herbert Dorfmann	South Tyrolean People's Party	EPP
Mara Bizzotto	Lega Nord	Non-Inscrits (until 14 June 2015) ENF
Mario Borghezio	Lega Nord	Non-Inscrits (until 14 June 2015) ENF
Gianluca Buonanno (until 5 June 2016) Angelo Ciocca (from 7 July 2016)	Lega Nord	Non-Inscrits (until 14 June 2015) ENF
Matteo Salvini (until 22 March 2018) Danilo Oscar Lancini (from 17 April 2018)	Lega Nord	Non-Inscrits (until 14 June 2015) ENF
Flavio Tosi (until 8 July 2014) Lorenzo Fontana (from 11 July 2014 to 22 March 2018) Giancarlo Scottà (17 April 2018)	Lega Nord	Non-Inscrits (until 14 June 2015) ENF
Salvatore Cicu	Forza Italia	EPP
Alberto Cirio	Forza Italia	EPP
Lara Comi	Forza Italia	EPP
Raffaele Fitto	Forza Italia (until 6 December 2015) Conservatives and Reformists	EPP (until 18 May 2015) ECR
Elisabetta Gardini	Forza Italia	EPP
Salvo Pogliese (until 13 July 2018) Gianfranco Miccichè (19 July 2018 to 19 August 2018) Innocenzo Leontini (from 20 August 2018)	Forza Italia (until 13 February 2019) Brothers of Italy	EPP (until 15 January 2019) ECR
Fulvio Martusciello	Forza Italia	EPP
Barbara Matera	Forza Italia	EPP
Giovanni Toti (until 9 July 2015) Stefano Maullu (from 13 July 2015)	Forza Italia (until 28 November 2018) Brothers of Italy	EPP (until 11 December 2018) ECR
Alessandra Mussolini	Forza Italia (until 3 September 2018) Independent (until 5 June 2018) Forza Italia	EPP (until 29 November 2016) Non-Inscrits (until 11 December 2016) EPP
Aldo Patriciello	Forza Italia	EPP
Remo Sernagiotto	Forza Italia (until 14 February 2016) Conservatives and Reformists	EPP (until 6 July 2015) ECR
Antonio Tajani	Forza Italia	EPP
Isabella Adinolfi	Five Star Movement	EFDD (until 15 October 2014) Non-Inscrits (until 19 October 2014) EFDD
Marco Affronte	Five Star Movement (until 10 January 2017) Independent (until 25 February 2019) Federation of the Greens	EFDD (until 15 October 2014) Non-Inscrits (until 19 October 2014) EFDD (until 10 January 2017) Greens/EFA
Laura Agea	Five Star Movement	EFDD (15 October 2014) Non-Inscrits (19 October 2014) EFDD
Daniela Aiuto	Five Star Movement (until 30 September 2019) Independent	EFDD (until 15 October 2014) Non-Inscrits (until 19 October 2014) EFDD
Tiziana Beghin	Five Star Movement	EFDD (until 15 October 2014) Non-Inscrits (until 19 October 2014) EFDD
David Borrelli	Five Star Movement (until 13 February 2018) Independent (until 16 April 2019) More Europe	EFDD (until 15 October 2014) Non-Inscrits (until 19 October 2014) EFDD (until 12 February 2018) Non-Inscrits (until 16 April 2019) ALDE
Fabio Massimo Castaldo	Five Star Movement	EFDD (until 15 October 2014) Non-Inscrits (until 19 October 2014) EFDD
Ignazio Corrao	Five Star Movement	EFDD (until 15 October 2014) Non-Inscrits (until 19 October 2014) EFDD
Rosa D'Amato	Five Star Movement	EFDD (until 15 October 2014) Non-Inscrits (until 19 October 2014) EFDD
Eleonora Evi	Five Star Movement	EFDD (until 15 October 2014) Non-Inscrits (until 19 October 2014) EFDD
Laura Ferrara	Five Star Movement	EFDD (15 October 2014) Non-Inscrits (19 October 2014) EFDD
Giulia Moi	Five Star Movement (until 7 January 2019) Independent	EFDD (15 October 2014) Non-Inscrits (19 October 2014) EFDD
Piernicola Pedicini	Five Star Movement	EFDD (until 15 October 2014) Non-Inscrits (until 19 October 2014) EFDD
Dario Tamburrano	Five Star Movement	EFDD (until 15 October 2014) Non-Inscrits (until 19 October 2014) EFDD
Marco Valli	Five Star Movement (until 6 January 2015) Independent	EFDD (until 15 October 2014) Non-Inscrits (until 19 October 2014) EFDD
Marco Zanni	Five Star Movement Independent (until 14 May 2018) Lega Nord	EFDD (until 15 October 2014) Non-Inscrits (until 19 October 2014) EFDD (until 10 January 2017) ENF
Marco Zullo	Five Star Movement	EFDD (until 15 October 2014) Non-Inscrits (until 19 October 2014) EFDD
Lorenzo Cesa	Union of the Centre	EPP
Giovanni La Via	Union of the Centre (until 15 May 2017) Popular Alternative (until 13 November 2018) Forza Italia	EPP
Massimiliano Salini	Union of the Centre (until 30 September 2015) Forza Italia	EPP
Eleonora Forenza	Other Europe with Tsipras	GUE/NGL
Curzio Maltese	Other Europe with Tsipras	GUE/NGL
Barbara Spinelli	Other Europe with Tsipras (until 17 May 2015) Independent	GUE/NGL

=== Party representation ===
National party	EP Group	Seats	±
Democratic Party	S&D	31 / 72	
Five Star Movement	EFDD	17 / 72	
Forza Italia	EPP	13 / 72	
Union of the Centre	EPP	3 / 72	
Other Europe with Tsipras	GUE/NGL	3 / 72	
South Tyrolean People's Party	EPP	1 / 72	
Lega Nord	Non-Inscrits	5 / 72	
