= 2019 European Parliament election in Italy =

- 26 May 2019

All 73 Italian seats to the European Parliament
- Opinion polls
- Turnout: 54.5% (▼2.7%)
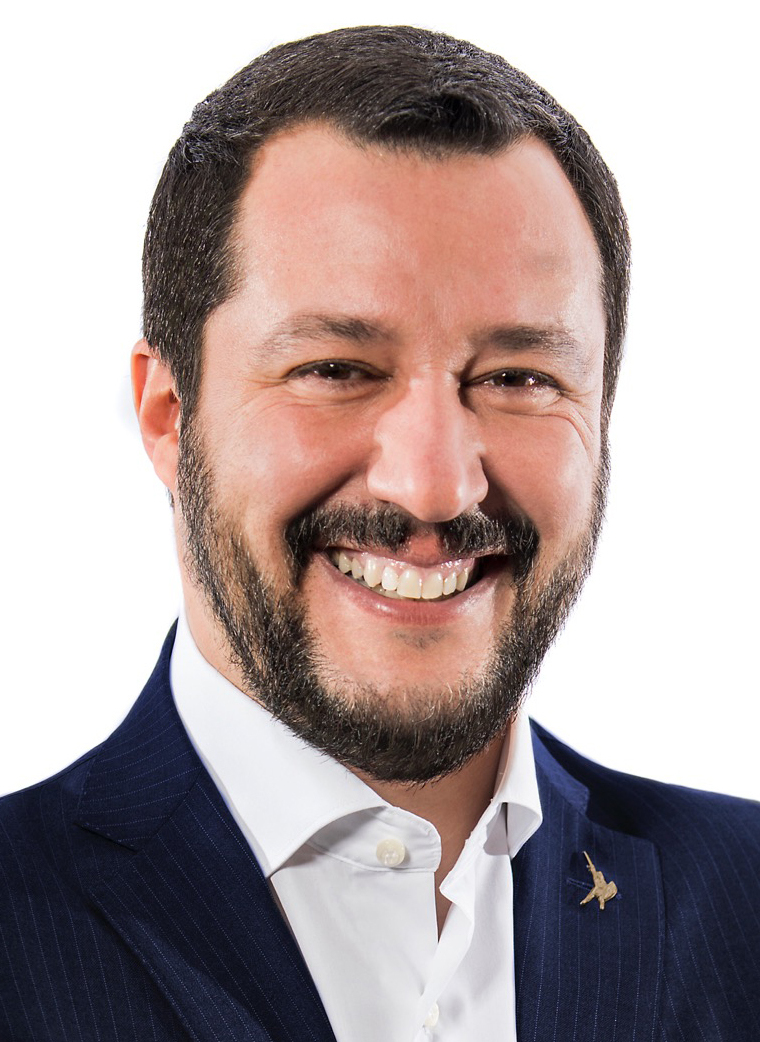

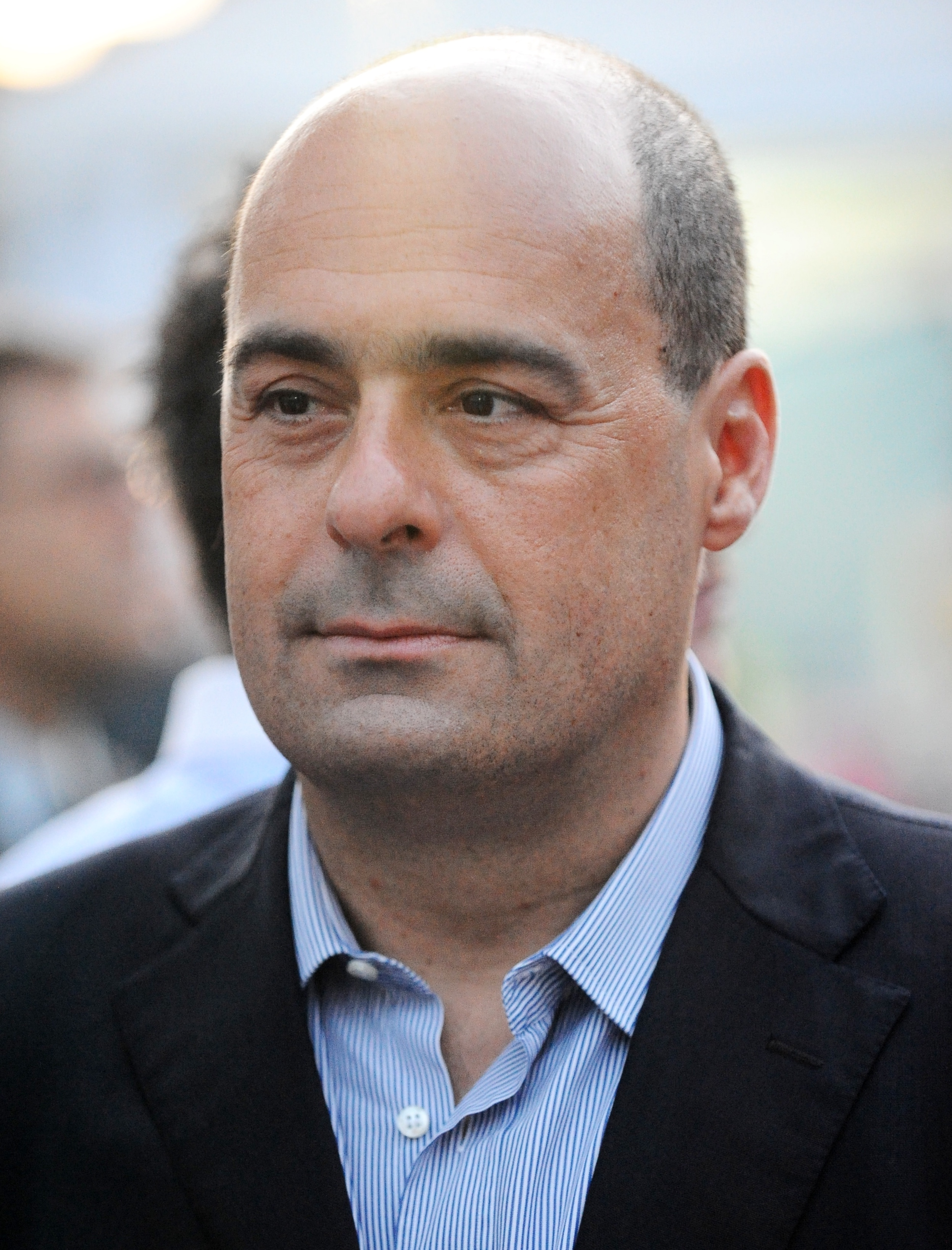

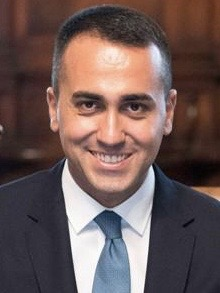

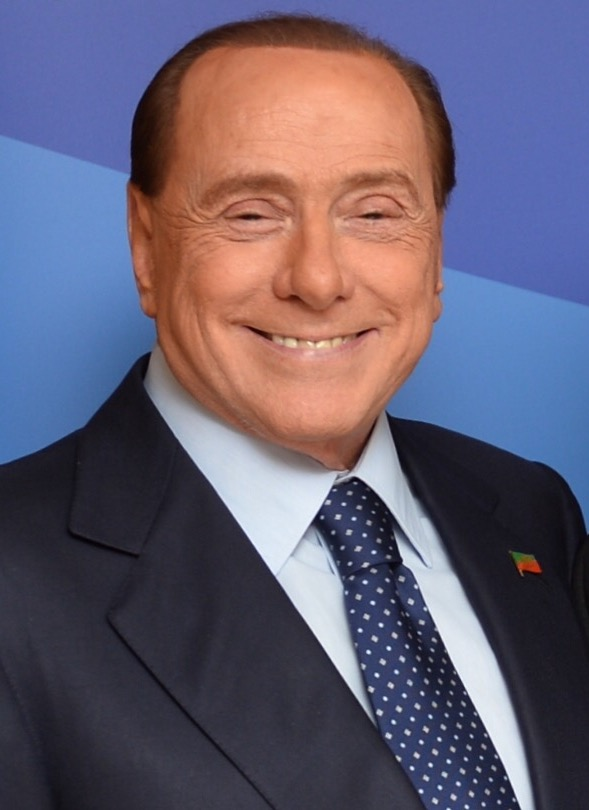

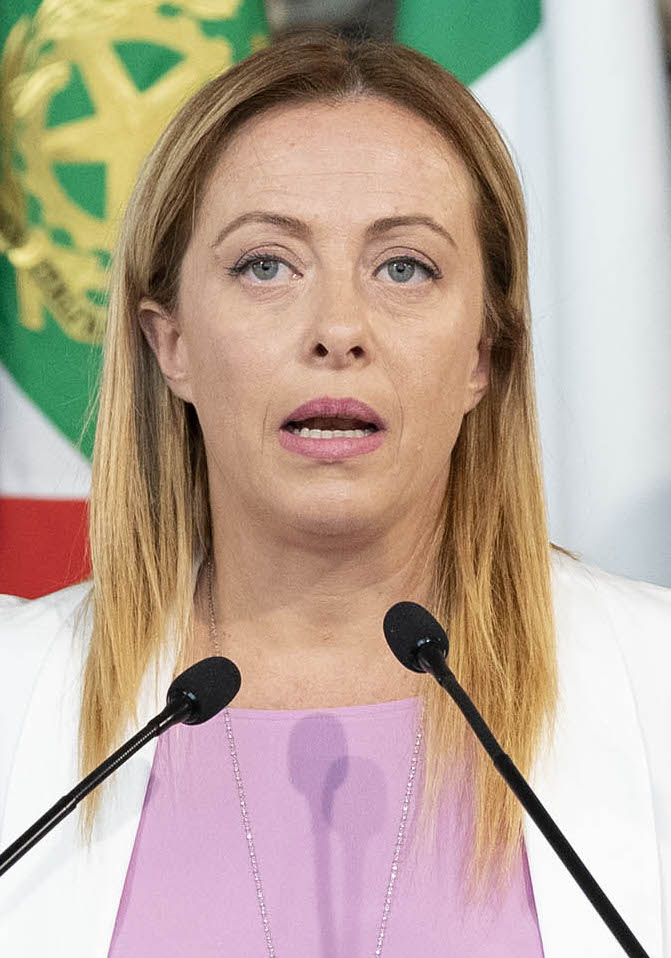

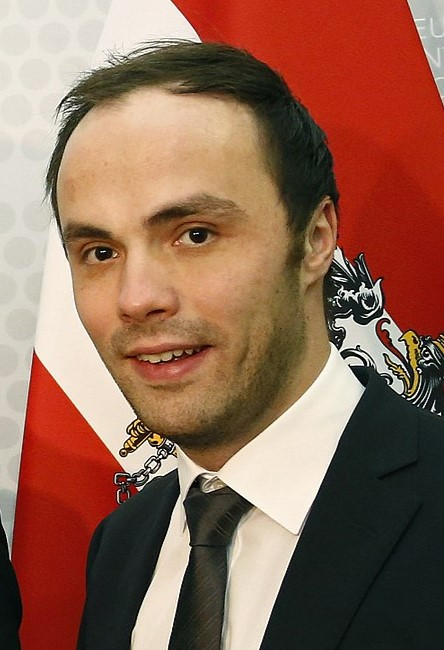
	First party	Second party	Third party
Leader	Matteo Salvini	Nicola Zingaretti	Luigi Di Maio
Party	League	Democratic Party	Five Star Movement
Alliance	ID	S&D	NI
Leader since	15 December 2013	17 March 2019	23 September 2017
Last election	6.2%, 5 seats	40.8%, 31 seats	21.2%, 17 seats
Seats won	29	19	14
Seat change	▲24	▼12	▼3
Popular vote	9,175,208	6,089,853	4,569,089
Percentage	34.3%	22.7%	17.1%
Swing	▲28.1%	▼18.1%	▼4.1%
	Fourth party	Fifth party	Sixth party
Leader	Silvio Berlusconi	Giorgia Meloni	Philipp Achammer
Party	Forza Italia	Brothers of Italy	SVP
Alliance	EPP	ECR	EPP
Leader since	18 January 1994	8 March 2014	3 May 2014
Last election	16.8%, 13 seats	3.7%, no seats	0.5%, 1 seat
Seats won	7	6	1
Seat change	▼6	▲6	0
Popular vote	2,351,673	1,726,189	142,185
Percentage	8.7%	6.4%	0.5%
Swing	▼8.3%	▲2.7%	0
- European election results map. Green denotes provinces with a League plurality, Red denotes provinces with a Democratic Party plurality, yellow denotes those with a Five Star Movement plurality, gray denotes those with a regionalist plurality.

The 2019 European Parliament election in Italy were held on 26 May 2019, electing members of the 9th Italian delegation to the European Parliament as part of the European elections held across the European Union.

== Background ==
In 2014, the governing Democratic Party (PD) of Prime Minister Matteo Renzi won the election with 40.8% of the vote and 31 seats, followed by the Five Star Movement (M5S) with 21.2% and 17 seats and Forza Italia (FI) with 16.8% and 13 seats. As a result, the PD was the second largest national party in the European Parliament by number of seats after the German CDU/CSU and the largest among the Progressive Alliance of Socialists and Democrats (S&D). The PD's score was also the best result for an Italian party in a nationwide election since the 1958 Italian general election, when Christian Democracy (DC) won 42.4% of the vote. After less than three years from the 2014 electoral landslide, Renzi was forced to resign after the defeat in the 2016 Italian constitutional referendum and his foreign affairs minister Paolo Gentiloni was appointed new head of government in December 2016.

The 2018 Italian general election was characterized by a strong showing of populist parties. The centre-right coalition, led by Matteo Salvini's right-wing populist League (Lega), emerged with a plurality of seats in the Chamber of Deputies and in the Senate while the anti-establishment M5S led by Luigi Di Maio became the party with the largest number of votes, and Renzi's centre-left coalition came only third, with the worst electoral result of its history. As no political group or party won an outright majority, it resulted in a hung parliament. After three months of negotiation, a government was finally formed on 1 June by the M5S and the League, with the M5S-linked independent Giuseppe Conte as Prime Minister of Italy and Di Maio and Salvini Deputy Prime Ministers of Italy.

On the centre-right side, FI welcomed in its lists candidates of the Union of the Centre (UdC) and several alike minor parties while Brothers of Italy (FdI) formed a partnership with Direction Italy (DI) and minor groups. In the 2019 PD leadership election held in March, Nicola Zingaretti was elected secretary of the PD. In April, Zingaretti presented a special logo for the election, including a large reference to "We Are Europeans", a manifesto launched by Carlo Calenda, and the symbol of the Party of European Socialists (PES). Additionally, the PD tried to forge an alliance with minor parties, including Article One (Art.1).

March and April registered more developments on the centre-left. Under the new leadership of Benedetto Della Vedova, More Europe (+E) formed a joint list with Italia in Comune (IiC), the Italian Socialist Party (PSI), the Italian Republican Party (PRI), the Italian section of the European Democratic Party (EDP), the Liberal Democratic Alliance for Italy (ALI), and minor parties; Italian Left (SI), the Communist Refoundation Party (PRC), minor parties and individual splinters from the disbanded Free and Equal (LeU) formed The Left (LS), a joint list inspired by the Party of the European Left (PEL); and the Federation of the Greens (FdV), Possible (Pos) and Green Italia (GI) formed Green Europe (EV) under the banner of the European Green Party (EGP).

== Electoral system ==
The party-list proportional representation was the traditional electoral system of the Italian Republic from its establishment in 1946 to 1994, therefore it was also adopted to elect the Italian members of the European Parliament (MEPs) since 1979. Two levels were introduced: a national level to divide the seats among parties and a constituency level to distribute them among candidates in open lists. Five constituencies were established, each including 2–5 Italian regions and each electing a fixed number of MEPs. At national level, seats are divided between party lists using the largest remainder method with Hare quota. Seats are allocated to parties and then to their most voted candidates. In the run-up to the 2009 European Parliament election, the Italian Parliament introduced a national electoral threshold of 4%. An exception was granted for parties representing some linguistic minorities as such lists can be connected with one of the major parties (apparentment), combining their votes, provided that those parties reach the 4% threshold and that candidates from minority parties obtain a sufficient number of votes, no less than 50,000 for the main candidate.

=== Constituencies ===
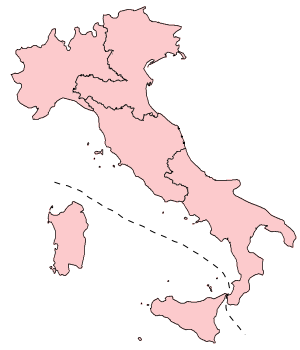
The electoral constituencies of Italy

Seats are allocated to party lists on a national basis using an electoral quota, with the residue given to the lists with the largest excess over whole quotas. An electoral quota is then calculated for each list and used to allocate seats to each list in each of the five electoral regions.

Electoral Region	Administrative Regions	Seats
North-West	Aosta Valley, Liguria, Lombardy, Piedmont	20
North-East	Emilia-Romagna, Friuli-Venezia Giulia, Trentino-Alto Adige/Südtirol, Veneto	15 (Note: One additional seat was assigned in February 2020, following the United Kingdom's exit from the European Union.)
Central	Latium, Marche, Tuscany, Umbria	15
Southern	Abruzzo, Apulia, Basilicata, Calabria, Campania, Molise	18
Islands	Sardinia, Sicily	8

== Main parties and leaders ==
=== Outgoing MEPs ===
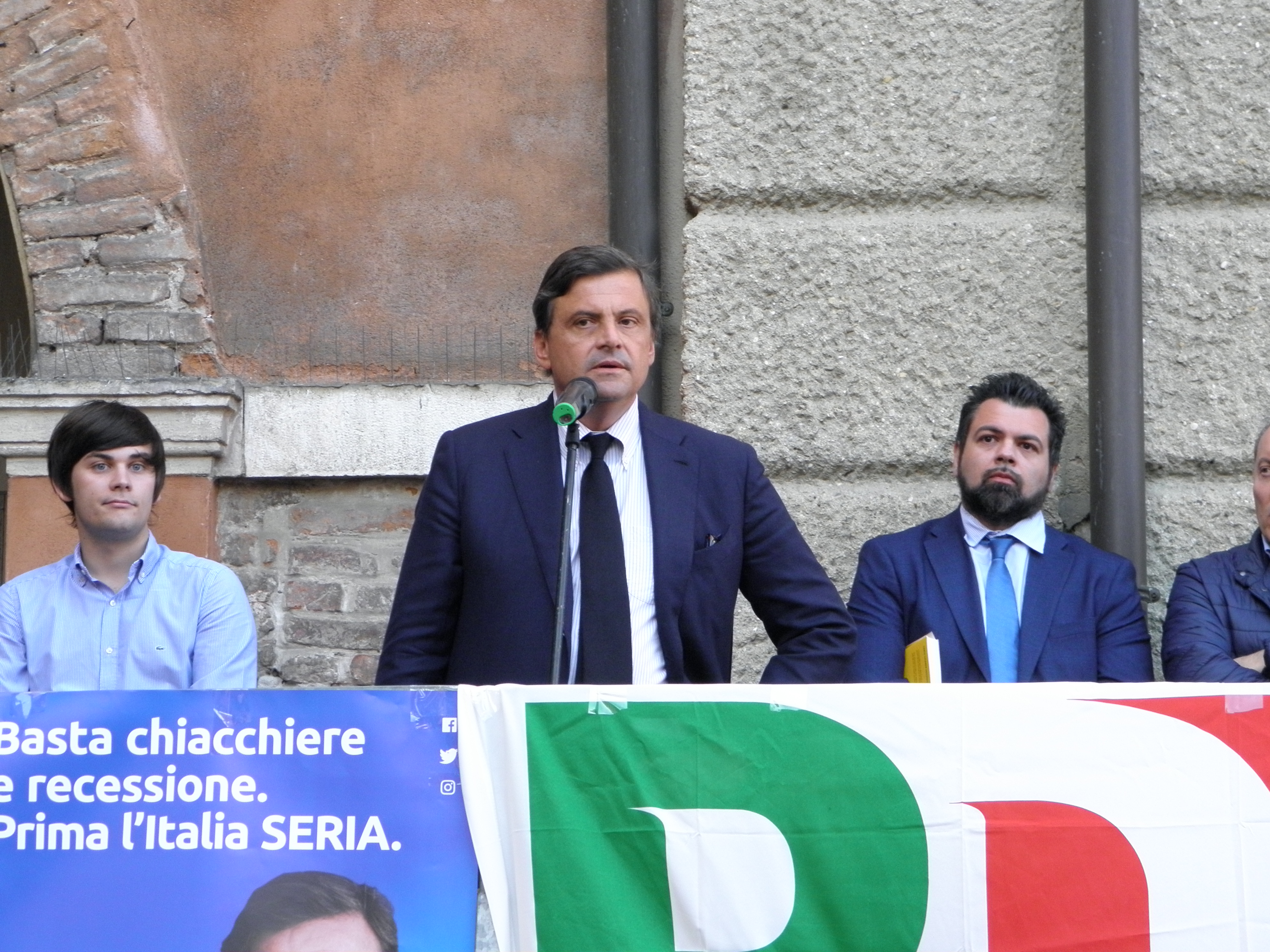
The Democratic Party candidate Carlo Calenda during a rally in Rovigo

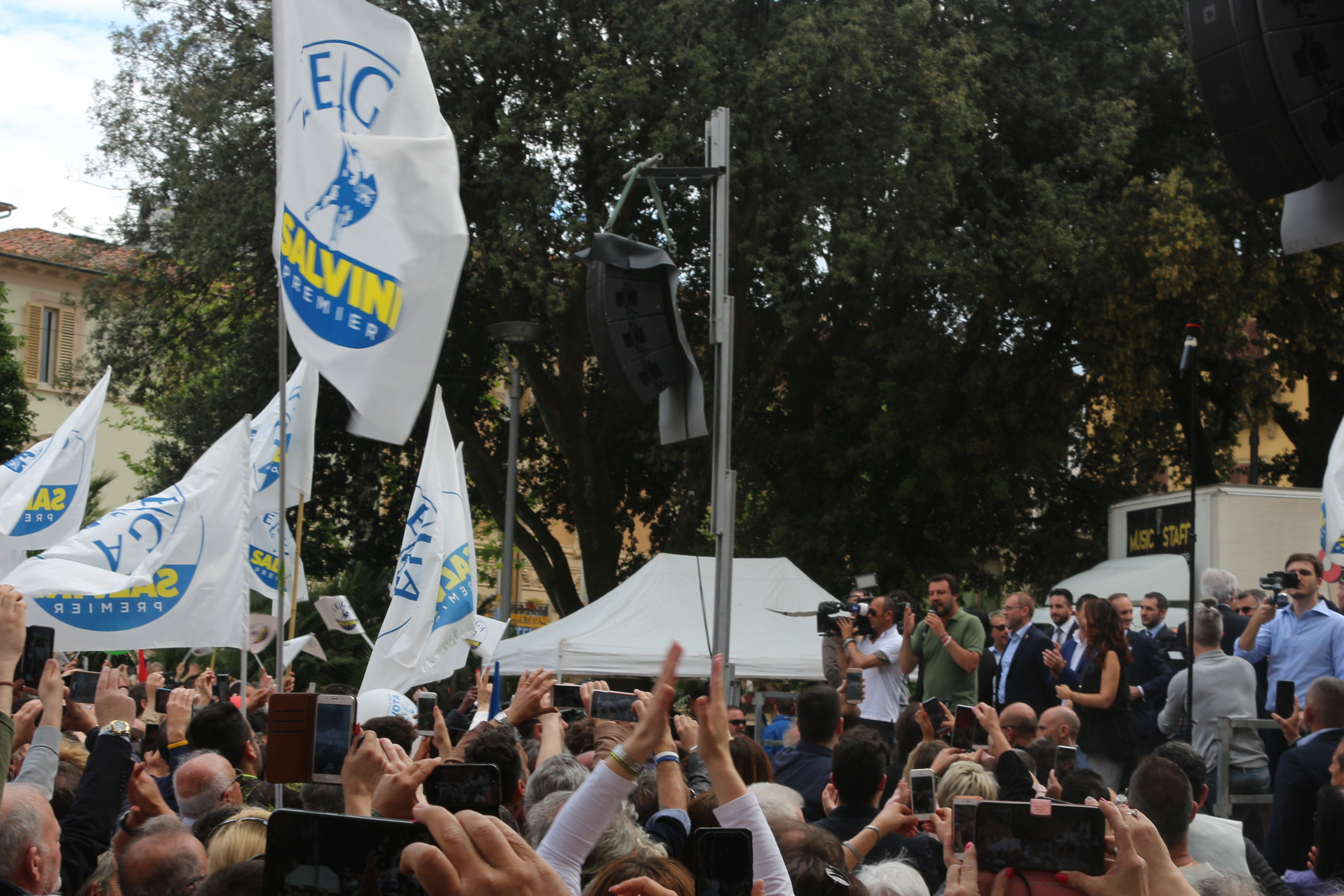
Matteo Salvini speaking during a League rally in Montecatini Terme

The table shows the detailed composition of the Italian seats at the European Parliament before 26 May 2019.

EP group	Seats	Party	Seats	MEPs
Progressive Alliance of Socialists and Democrats	31 / 73			
Progressive Alliance of Socialists and Democrats	31 / 73	Democratic Party	26	Brando Benifei; Goffredo Maria Bettini; Simona Bonafé; Mercedes Bresso; Renata Briano; Nicola Caputo; Caterina Chinnici; Silvia Costa; Andrea Cozzolino; Nicola Danti; Paolo De Castro; Isabella De Monte; Giosi Ferrandino; Enrico Gasbarra; Elena Gentile; Michela Giuffrida; Roberto Gualtieri; Cécile Kashetu Kyenge; Luigi Morgano; Alessia Maria Mosca; Pina Picierno; Gianni Pittella; David Sassoli; Renato Soru; Patrizia Toia; Daniele Viotti; Damiano Zoffoli
Progressive Alliance of Socialists and Democrats	31 / 73	Article One	3	Pier Antonio Panzeri; Massimo Paolucci; Flavio Zanonato
Progressive Alliance of Socialists and Democrats	31 / 73	Italian Left	1	Sergio Cofferati
Progressive Alliance of Socialists and Democrats	31 / 73	Possible	1	Elly Schlein
European People's Party	12 / 73			
European People's Party	12 / 73	Forza Italia	10	Salvatore Cicu; Alberto Cirio; Lara Comi; Giovanni La Via; Fulvio Martusciello; Barbara Matera; Alessandra Mussolini; Aldo Patriciello; Salvo Pogliese; Massimiliano Salini
European People's Party	12 / 73	Union of the Centre	1	Lorenzo Cesa
European People's Party	12 / 73	South Tyrolean People's Party	1	Herbert Dorfmann
Europe of Freedom and Direct Democracy	14 / 73	Five Star Movement	11	Isabella Adinolfi; Laura Agea; Tiziana Beghin; Fabio Massimo Castaldo; Ignazio Corrao; Rosa D'Amato; Eleonora Evi; Laura Ferrara; Piernicola Pedicini; Dario Tamburrano; Marco Zullo
Europe of Freedom and Direct Democracy	14 / 73	Italia in Comune	1	Daniela Aiuto
Europe of Freedom and Direct Democracy	14 / 73	Independents	2	Giulia Moi; Marco Valli
Europe of Nations and Freedom	6 / 73	League	6	Mara Bizzotto; Mario Borghezio; Angelo Ciocca; Danilo Oscar Lancini; Giancarlo Scottà; Marco Zanni
European Conservatives and Reformists	5 / 73	Brothers of Italy	3	Elisabetta Gardini; Innocenzo Leontini; Stefano Maullu
European Conservatives and Reformists	5 / 73	Direction Italy	2	Raffaele Fitto; Remo Sernagiotto
European United Left–Nordic Green Left	3 / 73			
European United Left–Nordic Green Left	3 / 73	The Other Europe	2	Curzio Maltese; Eleonora Forenza
European United Left–Nordic Green Left	3 / 73	Independents	1	Barbara Spinelli
Alliance of Liberals and Democrats for Europe	1 / 73	More Europe	1	David Borrelli
Greens–European Free Alliance	1 / 73	Federation of the Greens	1	Marco Affronte
Total			73	

=== Retiring incumbents ===
The following MEPs are not seeking re-election:

Constituency	Departing MEP	Party	EP Group	First elected	Terms	Date announced
Italian Islands	Renato Soru	Democratic Party	S&D	2014	1	3 September 2018
North-West Italy	Renata Briano	Democratic Party	S&D	2014	1	28 March 2019
Central Italy	Silvia Costa	Democratic Party	S&D	2009	2	4 April 2019
North-East Italy	Damiano Zoffoli	Democratic Party	S&D	2015	1	10 April 2019
North-East Italy	Elly Schlein	Possible	S&D	2014	1	12 April 2019

=== Summary of parties ===
This is a list of the parties that took part to the election.

Party	Main ideology	Leader(s)	European party	2014 result		Outgoing MEPs
Party	Main ideology	Leader(s)	European party	Votes (%)	Seats	Outgoing MEPs
Democratic Party (PD) (Note: Running as Democratic Party–We Are Europeans–PES and including Art.1, Demo.S, and Futura. The list was also in alliance with the French-speaking minority list ApE from Aosta Valley.)	Social democracy	Nicola Zingaretti	PES	40.8%	31 / 73	29 / 73
Five Star Movement (M5S)	Populism	Luigi Di Maio	None	21.5%	17 / 73	11 / 73
Forza Italia (FI) (Note: Including UDC, CP, PP, NcI, and SV. The list was also in alliance with SVP, German- and Ladin-speaking minority list from South Tyrol, for the occasion also including PATT from Trentino and SSk from Friuli-Venezia Giulia.)	Liberal conservatism	Silvio Berlusconi	EPP	16.8%	13 / 73	11 / 73
League (Lega) (Note: Including PLI and PSd'Az (Islands constituency.))	Right-wing populism	Matteo Salvini	MENF	6.2%	5 / 73	6 / 73
Brothers of Italy (FdI) (Note: Including MNS and DI.)	National conservatism	Giorgia Meloni	ACRE	3.7%	0 / 73	5 / 73
The Left (LS) (Note: List composed of SI, PRC, AET, PdS, and individual splinters from the disbanded LeU.)	Democratic socialism	Nicola Fratoianni; Maurizio Acerbo	PEL	4.0%	3 / 73	3 / 73
Green Europe (EV) (Note: List composed of FdV, Pos, GI (in the North-East), and Grüne.)	Green politics	Several leaders	EGP	0.9%	0 / 73	2 / 73
South Tyrolean People's Party (SVP) (Note: List in alliance with the Democratic Party and composed of UV, UVP, ALPE, SA, and EPAV.)	Regionalism	Philipp Achammer	EPP	0.5%	1 / 73	1 / 73
More Europe (+E) (Note: Including IiC, PSI, PRI, ALI, the EDP's Italian section, TK from South Tyrol and PP from Apulia)	Liberalism	Benedetto Della Vedova	ALDE	Did not contest		0 / 73
Communist Party (PC)	Communism	Marco Rizzo	INITIATIVE	Did not contest		0 / 73
Animalist Party (PA)	Animal rights	Cristiano Ceriello	APEU	Did not contest		0 / 73
The People of the Family – Popular Alternative (PdF–AP)	Social conservatism	Mario Adinolfi	EPP	Did not contest		0 / 73
CasaPound – United Right (CP–DU)	Neo-fascism	Simone Di Stefano; Massimiliano Panero	AENM	Did not contest		0 / 73
Populars for Italy (PpI)	Christian democracy	Mario Mauro	EPP	Did not contest		0 / 73
Pirate Party (PP)	Pirate politics	None	PPEU	Did not contest		0 / 73
New Force (FN)	Neo-fascism	Roberto Fiore	APF	Did not contest		0 / 73
Autonomies for Europe (ApE) (Note: List in alliance with Forza Italia, also including UV, UVP, ALPE, SA, and EPAV.)	Regionalism	Several leaders	EFA	Did not contest		0 / 73

=== Top candidates ===
In the following table, the top candidates of each party/list in the five constituencies are listed.

Party	North-West	North-East	Centre	South	Islands	Source
Democratic Party	Giuliano Pisapia	Carlo Calenda	Simona Bonafé	Franco Roberti	Caterina Chinnici	
Five Star Movement	Sabrina Pignedoli	Maria Angela Danzì	Daniela Rondinelli	Chiara Maria Gemma	Alessandra Todde	
Forza Italia	Silvio Berlusconi		Antonio Tajani	Silvio Berlusconi		
League	Matteo Salvini					
Brothers of Italy	Giorgia Meloni					
The Left	Eleonora Cirant	Silvia Prodi	Marilena Grassadonia	Eleonora Forenza	Corradino Mineo	
Green Europe	Elena Grandi	Silvia Zamboni	Annalisa Corrado	Eliana Baldo	Nadia Spallitta	
More Europe	Benedetto Della Vedova	Federico Pizzarotti	Emma Bonino	Raimondo Pasquino	Fabrizio Ferrandelli	

=== Slogans ===
Party	Original slogan	English translation	Source
Democratic Party	Una nuova Europa, un'Italia più forte	"A New Europe, a Stronger Italy"	
Five Star Movement	Continuare per cambiare	"Continuing for changing"	
Forza Italia	Per cambiare l'Europa	"To Change Europe"	
League	Prima l'Italia	"Italy First"	
Brothers of Italy	In Europa per cambiare tutto	"In Europe to Change Everything"	
The Left	Noi con te	"Us with You"	
Green Europe	Tocca a noi	"It Is Our Turn"	
More Europe	Un'altra Italia c'è	"There Is Another Italy"	

== Opinion polling ==
Poll results are listed according to the date of publication of the survey. Detailed data are usually published in the official website of the Italian government. The publication of opinion polls during the last 15 days of the electoral campaign is forbidden by Italian law.

Polls after April 2019

Date	Polling firm	Sample size	PD	M5S	FI	Lega	LS	FdI	EV	+E	Others	Lead
8–9 May	Tecnè	1,000	21.5	22.5	10.5	31.0	3.0	5.0		3.5	3.0	8.5
8–9 May	Euromedia	800	21.9	21.5	10.1	29.6	2.0	5.3	1.3	3.5	4.8	7.7
8–9 May	Demopolis	2,000	22.2	23.0	8.4	31.0	2.8	5.5		3.2	3.9	8.0
7–9 May	Scenari Politici – Winpoll	1,500	22.1	22.7	7.8	33.8	2.1	5.8	1.3	2.4	2.0	11.1
6–9 May	Ixè	1,000	20.1	20.5	9.6	30.5	3.4	5.2	1.8	4.0	4.9	10.0
5–9 May	Termometro Politico	6,000	21.8	23.0	9.5	30.6	1.9	5.8	0.8	2.8	4.6	7.6
8 May	Piepoli	503	21.0	22.0	10.0	30.5	2.0	5.0	1.0	3.5	5.0	8.5
7–8 May	Index	800	21.1	22.3	9.2	32.4	2.7	5.0	1.7	3.0	2.6	10.1
6–8 May	SWG	1,500	22.5	22.7	9.4	30.5	2.7	4.7	1.7	2.6	3.2	7.8
6–8 May	Ipsos	1,000	20.5	24.9	7.8	30.9	2.1	5.7	1.8	3.2	3.1	6.0
6–8 May	Bidimedia	1,455	21.2	22.4	9.0	32.2	2.5	4.7	1.7	3.0	3.3	9.8
6–8 May	Demos & Pi	1,007	20.4	22.6	9.5	32.2	3.1	4.7		4.1	3.4	9.6
7 May	EMG	1,642	21.2	23.5	10.3	32.2	2.6	5.0		2.8	2.4	8.7
7 May	Noto	–	21.0	21.0	9.0	32.0	2.0	5.5	1.0	3.5	5.0	11.0
5–7 May	Demopolis	1,500	22.0	23.0	8.5	31.0	2.8	5.6		3.0	4.1	8.0
4–6 May	Tecnè	1,509	21.0	22.0	10.5	31.0	3.5	5.0		3.5	3.5	9.0
30 Apr–6 May	SWG	1,500	22.2	22.7	9.1	30.7	2.8	4.6	1.8	2.7	3.4	8.0
24 Apr–6 May	CISE	1,000	21.6	23.1	11.7	27.3	1.0	4.6		4.2	6.5	4.3
2–3 May	Quorum – YouTrend	1,000	21.4	22.2	9.5	32.1	3.2	5.3		2.3	4.0	9.9
2 May	Piepoli	–	20.5	22.0	10.0	31.0	2.0	5.5	1.0	3.5	4.5	9.0
2 May	Euromedia	800	20.3	20.6	10.3	32.4	1.5	5.3	1.4	3.8	4.4	11.8
30 Apr	Noto	–	22.0	20.0	8.5	32.0	2.5	6.0	1.5	3.0	4.5	10.0
25–30 Apr	Termometro Politico	2,000	21.8	23.5	9.2	31.1	2.0	5.7	0.8	2.8	3.1	7.6
28–29 Apr	Tecnè	1,000	21.4	21.5	11.2	32.2	2.8	4.9		3.1	2.9	10.7
24–29 Apr	SWG	1,500	22.5	21.8	8.8	31.6	3.1	5.0	1.5	2.9	2.8	9.1
27 Apr	EMG	1,536	21.9	22.9	10.1	32.2	2.5	5.1		3.0	2.3	9.3
23 Apr	EMG	1,525	22.6	23.1	10.2	31.3	2.8	5.4		3.0	1.6	8.2
23 Apr	Noto	–	21.0	20.5	8.5	33.5	2.0	6.0	1.0	3.0	4.5	12.5
22–23 Apr	Demopolis	1,500	21.0	22.0	8.0	33.0		5.0			11.0	11.0
18–23 Apr	Scenari Politici – Winpoll	1,500	20.5	20.1	8.7	36.4	1.9	5.4	1.7	3.1	2.2	15.9
17–23 Apr	SWG	1,500	22.0	22.3	8.4	32.3	3.4	4.8	1.6	3.0	2.2	10.0
19–22 Apr	Termometro Politico	1,000	22.0	23.5	9.1	31.5	2.1	5.7	1.0	2.9	2.2	8.0
20 Apr	Ipsos	–	18.7	22.3	8.7	36.9	2.1	4.6	1.3	3.0	2.4	14.6
16 Apr	EMG	1,794	21.8	22.6	9.5	32.1	2.9	4.9		2.9	3.3	9.5
16 Apr	Noto	–	20.0	21.0	9.0	33.5	3.0	6.0	1.5	3.5	2.5	12.5
10–15 Apr	SWG	1,500	21.5	22.5	8.9	32.3	2.9	4.8	1.2	3.3	2.6	9.8

Hypothetical polls until April 2019

Date	Polling firm	Sample size	PD	M5S	FI	Lega	LeU (Note: In the 2018 Italian general election, LeU was a joint list, mainly comprising Art.1 and SI. Some polls included Art.1 or SI or both, sometimes together, instead of LeU. Since April 2019, some polls started to track SI along with PRC and Art.1 separately. Art.1 finally chose to run with the PD.)	FdI	+E	PaP (Note: In the 2018 general election, PaP was a joint list, including PRC and PCI, which left the alliance a few months later. Some polls included these two parties within PaP and/or CP. In March 2019, CP's leader Luigi de Magistris announced it would not participate in the election. In April, PaP decided not to run in the election.)	EV (Note: Until March 2019, the results referred to the proposed joint list formed by FdV, IiC (which finally decided to side with +E), and GI. Since April 2019, the results referred to EV, a joint list of FdV, Pos, and GI.)	LS	Others	Lead
16 Apr 2019	Piepoli	503	20.5	22.5	10.5	31.0	1.5	5.5	3.0		1.5	2.0	1.5	8.5
16 Apr 2019	Euromedia	800	19.5	20.8	10.6	33.0	1.7	5.5	3.8		1.2	1.3	2.6	12.2
11–12 Apr 2019	Quorum	1,000	22.1	22.3	9.9	33.2	1.0	5.1	2.0			1.7	3.7	10.9
8–11 Apr 2019	Bidimedia	1,310	21.5	21.5	10.1	32.3		4.8	3.3		1.6	2.8	2.1	10.8
2–10 Apr 2019	Termometro Politico	1,500	21.7	22.6	9.8	32.0		5.6	3.0		1.4	2.3	1.6	9.4
9 Apr 2019	EMG	1,845	21.5	22.3	10.1	31.4		4.8	2.9				6.2	9.1
9 Apr 2019	Noto	–	21.0	20.0	9.5	32.5	1.5	5.5	3.0	1.0			6.0	11.5
3–8 Apr 2019	SWG	1,500	22.1	22.0	8.9	31.8		4.9	3.1	1.1		2.9	3.2	9.7
2–4 Apr 2019	Ipsos	1,000	19.0	23.3	9.9	35.7		4.0	3.1		0.7	2.0	2.3	12.4
3 Apr 2019	Piepoli	504	20.0	22.5	10.5	30.5	1.5	5.0	3.0			1.5	5.5	8.0
3 Apr 2019	Euromedia	800	20.1	19.4	11.1	31.4	1.5	5.4	3.8			2.4	4.9	11.3
2 Apr 2019	EMG	1,725	21.1	22.7	9.3	31.9	3.4	4.7	2.9	1.6	w. LeU	w. LeU	2.4	9.2
2 Apr 2019	Noto	–	21.0	20.5	10.5	32.0	1.5	5.0	3.5	1.0			5.0	11.0
27 Mar–1 Apr 2019	SWG	1,500	20.8	22.2	9.0	32.9	1.0	4.6	2.9	1.3		2.3	3.0	10.7
25 Mar–1 Apr 2019	Termometro Politico	4,000	21.6	21.3	9.1	31.9	2.5	4.6	3.2	1.1	w. LeU	1.1	3.6	10.3
29–30 Mar 2019	Quorum – YouTrend	1,000	20.5	22.7	10.0	32.1	0.7	5.3	2.7			2.7	3.3	9.4
26 Mar 2019	EMG	1,865	21.1	22.9	9.5	31.8		4.9	3.0	1.6			5.2	8.9
26 Mar 2019	Noto	–	21.0	21.0	11.0	32.0	2.0	4.5	3.5	1.0			4.0	11.0
20–25 Mar 2019	SWG	1,500	21.0	21.3	8.7	33.4	2.3	4.7	2.9	2.2	1.0	w. LeU	2.5	12.1
21 Mar 2019	Piepoli	–	20.0	23.0	11.5	31.0	1.5	4.5	3.0			0.5	5.0	8.0
20–21 Mar 2019	Euromedia	800	20.7	19.8	11.4	33.1	1.5	4.7	3.6			0.7	4.5	12.4
16–20 Mar 2019	Bidimedia	1,245	21.2	21.1	9.7	33.0		4.1	2.7		1.8	3.0	3.4	11.8
19 Mar 2019	EMG	1,785	21.0	23.4	10.0	30.9		4.8	3.0	1.6		did not exist	5.3	7.5
19 Mar 2019	Noto	–	21.0	21.0	11.0	32.5	1.5	4.5	3.5	1.0		did not exist	4.0	11.5
13–18 Mar 2019	SWG	1,500	21.1	21.0	8.6	33.9	2.4	4.4	3.0	2.0	1.1	did not exist	2.5	12.8
12 Mar 2019	EMG	1,845	19.9	23.8	9.8	30.6		4.9	3.1	1.6		did not exist	6.3	6.8
12 Mar 2019	Piepoli	500	19.0	24.5	11.0	31.5	2.5	4.0	3.5			did not exist	4.0	7.0
12 Mar 2019	Noto	–	21.0	21.0	11.5	32.5	1.5	4.0	3.5	1.0		did not exist	4.0	11.5
6–11 Mar 2019	SWG	1,500	20.3	21.8	8.9	33.7	2.6	4.1	2.8	1.9	1.2	did not exist	3.1	11.9
5 Mar 2019	EMG	1,803	19.3	23.2	10.2	31.2		4.8	3.1	1.4		did not exist	6.8	8.0
5 Mar 2019	Noto	–	20.0	21.0	11.0	33.0	1.5	4.0	3.5	1.0		did not exist	5.0	12.0
27 Feb–4 Mar 2019	SWG	1,500	19.8	22.1	8.8	33.4	2.4	4.4	3.0	2.0	1.1	did not exist	3.1	11.3
26–28 Feb 2019	Ipsos	1,000	18.5	21.2	8.6	35.9	2.4	4.0	4.0			did not exist	5.4	14.7
21–28 Feb 2019	Termometro Politico	2,400	20.5	21.3	8.2	31.5		4.5	4.1	2.8		did not exist	7.1	10.2
22–27 Feb 2019	Bidimedia	1,084	18.6	22.0	9.0	33.2	1.4	4.2	3.4	3.4	1.7	did not exist	3.1	11.2
26 Feb 2019	EMG	1,603	18.2	23.8	10.7	31.2		5.0	3.0	1.6		did not exist	6.5	7.4
25 Feb 2019	Piepoli	505	18.5	25.0	11.0	31.5	1.5	4.5	3.5			did not exist	4.5	6.5
25 Feb 2019	Euromedia	800	18.6	21.8	11.0	34.6	1.9	4.7	3.7			did not exist	3.7	12.8
20–25 Feb 2019	SWG	1,500	18.5	22.6	8.7	33.2	3.0	4.3	3.1	2.3	1.0	did not exist	4.3	10.6
19 Feb 2019	EMG	1,802	17.9	24.8	10.3	30.7		5.2	3.0	1.6		did not exist	6.5	5.9
19 Feb 2019	Noto	–	18.0	21.0	11.0	35.0	2.0	4.0	3.5	1.0		did not exist	4.5	14.0
13–18 Feb 2019	SWG	1,500	18.6	22.1	9.0	33.4	2.9	4.5	2.9	2.2	1.2	did not exist	3.2	11.3
13–15 Feb 2019	Quorum – YouTrend	1,003	18.0	24.3	10.3	32.9		5.1				did not exist	9.4	8.6
12 Feb 2019	EMG	–	18.0	24.6	9.5	31.4		4.9	3.0	2.0		did not exist	6.6	6.8
12 Feb 2019	Piepoli	500	18.0	27.5	10.0	31.0	2.0	5.0	3.5			did not exist	3.5	3.5
12 Feb 2019	Euromedia	800	18.3	23.5	10.8	34.5	1.8	5.0	3.5			did not exist	2.6	11.0
12 Feb 2019	Noto	–	19.0	22.0	10.0	34.0	2.0	4.5	3.5	1.5		did not exist	3.5	12.0
6–11 Feb 2019	SWG	1,500	17.5	23.3	8.5	33.8	2.7	4.6	3.1	2.4	1.0	did not exist	3.1	10.5
6–7 Feb 2019	Ipsos	1,000	16.1	25.4	8.1	34.4	2.2	3.6	4.2			did not exist	6.0	9.0
6 Feb 2019	Noto	–	19.0	24.0	9.0	33.0	2.0	4.5	3.0	1.5		did not exist	3.5	9.0
2–6 Feb 2019	Bidimedia	1,113	18.2	24.0	8.4	32.5		3.8	3.5	3.7		did not exist	5.9	8.5
5 Feb 2019	EMG	1,803	18.7	25.1	9.7	30.1		4.5	3.0	2.0		did not exist	6.9	5.0
30 Jan–4 Feb 2019	SWG	1,500	16.8	24.0	8.3	33.8	2.9	4.3	3.1	2.5	1.0	did not exist	3.3	9.8
29 Jan 2019	EMG	1,786	18.2	25.8	9.2	30.3		4.5	3.0	1.9		did not exist	7.1	4.5
29 Jan 2019	Piepoli	503	18.0	28.0	9.5	31.0	2.5	5.0	4.0			did not exist	1.5	3.0
29 Jan 2019	Euromedia	800	16.1	24.2	10.0	33.7	1.4	5.1	3.1			did not exist	6.3	9.5
28 Jan 2019	Quorum	1,000	19.1	26.6	9.6	30.9		5.0				did not exist	8.8	4.3
23–28 Jan 2019	SWG	1,500	17.2	24.9	8.1	32.6	2.6	4.5	2.9	2.4	1.2	did not exist	3.6	7.7
22 Jan 2019	EMG	1,801	17.9	26.5	8.9	30.1		4.7	2.6	2.1		did not exist	7.2	3.6
16–21 Jan 2019	SWG	1,500	17.9	25.7	8.6	31.5	2.8	4.4	3.0	2.3		did not exist	3.8	5.8
15–17 Jan 2019	Ipsos	1,000	17.3	25.4	7.1	35.8		3.4	3.5			did not exist	7.5	10.4
15 Jan 2019	EMG	1,794	18.5	26.6	8.8	30.6		4.4	2.1	1.8		did not exist	7.2	4.0
9–14 Jan 2019	SWG	1,500	17.3	25.2	8.2	32.2	3.1	4.2	3.2	2.5		did not exist	4.1	7.0
7–10 Jan 2019	BiDiMedia	1,096	18.0	24.2	8.3	32.3		4.2	3.8	3.6		did not exist	5.6	8.1
8 Jan 2019	EMG	1,540	19.1	26.1	8.3	31.0		4.1	2.0	2.0		did not exist	7.4	4.9
3–7 Jan 2019	SWG	1,500	17.3	26.3	8.3	32.2	2.8	3.8	2.9	2.2		did not exist	4.2	5.9
17–21 Dec 2018	BiDiMedia	1,018	16.8	24.8	7.3	33.7	1.4	3.8	4.2	4.0		did not exist	4.0	8.9
18 Dec 2018	EMG	1,611	18.0	27.9	8.5	31.4		4.1	2.1	1.9		did not exist	6.1	3.5
12–17 Dec 2018	SWG	1,500	16.8	26.5	8.0	33.0	2.3	4.0	2.8	2.4		did not exist	4.2	6.5
11 Dec 2018	EMG	1,803	17.7	26.4	8.4	32.1		4.0	2.2	2.0		did not exist	7.2	5.7
5–10 Dec 2018	SWG	1,500	17.5	26.2	8.7	32.0	2.3	3.7	3.0	2.4		did not exist	4.2	5.8
3–6 Dec 2018	Twig	1,000	17.5	26.9	10.1	31.8		2.8	2.7			did not exist	8.2	4.9
4 Dec 2018	EMG	1,784	18.5	25.7	8.2	32.1		4.0	2.2	2.1		did not exist	7.0	6.4
28 Nov–3 Dec 2018	SWG	1,500	17.6	27.3	8.2	32.0	2.4	3.3	2.8	2.4		did not exist	4.0	4.7
28 Nov 2018	Noto	–	18.0	25.0	9.5	34.0	2.0	4.0	2.5	2.0		did not exist	6.0	9.0
27 Nov 2018	EMG	1,803	18.5	25.9	8.3	32.0		4.0	2.1	2.0		did not exist	7.2	6.1
25 Nov 2018	Noto	–	17.0	25.0	9.0	33.0	2.0	3.5	2.5	2.0		did not exist	6.0	8.0
19–22 Nov 2018	BiDiMedia	1,081	17.4	26.1	7.3	32.9	1.4	4.2	3.4	3.3		did not exist	4.0	6.8
25 May 2014	Election results	–	40.8	21.2	16.8	6.2	–	3.7	–	–	–	–	11.3	19.6

== Results ==
Seat totals by constituency. As this is a PR election, seat totals are determined by the national popular vote.

← Summary of 26 May 2019 European Parliament election results in Italy →
Party	Votes	%	+/−	Seats	+/−
League (Lega)	9,175,208	34.26	+28.12	28 / 73 (Note: Increased to 29 following Brexit.)	+23
Democratic Party – We Are Europeans (PD–SE)	6,089,853	22.74	−18.03	19 / 73	−12
Five Star Movement (M5S)	4,569,089	17.06	−4.11	14 / 73	−3
Forza Italia (FI)	2,351,673	8.78	−8.04	6 / 73 (Note: Increased to 7 following Brexit.)	−7
Brothers of Italy (FdI)	1,726,189	6.44	+2.78	5 / 73 (Note: Increased to 6 following Brexit.)	+5
More Europe – Italia in Comune – European Democratic Party (+E–IiC–PDE)	833,443	3.11	new	0 / 73	new
Green Europe (EV)	621,492	2.32	+1.41	0 / 73	±0
The Left (LS)	469,943	1.75	−2.29	0 / 73	−3
Communist Party (PC)	235,542	0.88	new	0 / 73	new
Animalist Party (PA)	160,270	0.60	new	0 / 73	new
South Tyrolean People's Party (SVP) (Note: List connected to Forza Italia.)	142,185	0.53	+0.03	1 / 73	±0
The People of the Family – Popular Alternative (PdF–AP)	114,531	0.43	new	0 / 73	new
CasaPound – United Right (CP–DU)	89,142	0.33	new	0 / 73	new
Populars for Italy (PpI)	80,553	0.30	new	0 / 73	new
Pirate Party (PP)	60,809	0.23	new	0 / 73	new
New Force (FN)	41,077	0.15	new	0 / 73	new
Autonomies for Europe (ApE) (Note: List connected to the Democratic Party.)	17,692	0.07	new	0 / 73	new
Thought and Action Party (PPA)	5,041	0.02	new	0 / 73	new
Valid votes	26,783,732	96.41			
Blank and invalid votes	994,450	3.59			
Totals	27,780,855	100.00			
Electorate and voter turnout	50,977,280	54.50			
Source: Ministry of the Interior

Popular vote
Lega	34.3%
PD	22.7%
M5S	17.1%
FI	8.8%
FdI	6.5%
+E	3.1%
EV	2.3%
LS	1.8%
Others	4.3%

Seats distribution (post-Brexit)
Lega	38.2%
PD	25.0%
M5S	18.4%
FI	9.2%
FdI	7.9%
SVP	1.3%

=== Distribution by European group ===
European Parliament group	Seats	National party	Seats
Identity and Democracy	28 / 73	League (Lega)	28
Progressive Alliance of Socialists and Democrats	19 / 73	Democratic Party (PD)	19
European People's Party Group	7 / 73	Forza Italia (FI)	6
European People's Party Group	7 / 73	South Tyrolean People's Party (SVP)	1
European Conservatives and Reformists	5 / 73	Brothers of Italy (FdI)	5
Non-Inscrits	14 / 73	Five Star Movement (M5S)	14

=== Detailed results ===
By constituency

Italian constituencies	Lega			PD			M5S			FI			FdI			+E			EV			LS			Others			T/o
Italian constituencies	No.	%	S	No.	%	S	No.	%	S	No.	%	S	No.	%	S	No.	%	S	No.	%	S	No.	%	S	No.	%	S	T/o
North-West	3,193,908	40.61	9	1,849,085	23.51	5	873,749	11.11	2	691,037	8.79	2	443,763	5.64	2	249,778	3.18	0	193,394	2.46	0	116,507	1.48	0	254,456	3.22	0	62.67
North-East	2,381,555	40.90	7	1,388,378	23.84	4	599,106	10.29	2	339,016	5.82	0	333,390	5.72	1	202,518	3.48	0	186,018	3.19	0	84,447	1.45	0	309,139	5.31	1	62.46
Central	1,848,005	33.36	6	1,488,260	26.87	4	882,802	15.94	2	345,788	6.24	2	385,962	6.97	1	167,206	3.02	0	120,429	2.17	0	123,396	2.23	0	177,435	3.20	0	58.35
Southern	1,291,546	23.46	5	984,619	17.88	4	1,603,392	29.12	6	674,489	12.25	2	414,767	7.53	1	173,591	3.15	0	94,379	1.71	0	111,821	2.03	0	157,723	2.87	0	46.46
Islands	460,194	22.46	2	379,511	18.52	2	610,040	29.77	2	301,343	14.71	1	148,307	7.24	1	40,350	1.97	0	27,272	1.33	0	33,772	1.65	0	48,359	2.35	0	34.86

By region

Regions	Lega		PD		M5S		FI		FdI		+E		EV		LS		Others		T/o
Regions	No.	%	No.	%	No.	%	No.	%	No.	%	No.	%	No.	%	No.	%	No.	%	T/o
Aosta Valley	18,525	37.17	8,084	16.22	4,830	9.69	2,684	5.38	1,618	3.25	1,844	3.70	2,322	4.66	1,331	2.67	8,606	17.26	51.91
Piedmont	813,005	37.14	524,078	23.94	290,141	13.26	198,721	9.08	130,986	5.98	72,139	3.30	50,457	2.31	32,784	1.50	76,526	3.49	64.67
Lombardy	2,107,080	43.38	1,120,933	23.08	453,863	9.34	430,141	8.86	268,414	5.53	150,192	3.09	119,667	2.46	65,182	1.34	141,669	2.92	64.10
Liguria	251,696	33.88	185,260	24.94	122,536	16.49	57,887	7.79	42,118	5.67	22,649	3.05	18,332	2.47	16,148	2.17	26,289	3.54	58.50
Trentino-Alto Adige/Südtirol	137,739	27.78	79,329	16.00	31,167	6.29	17,587	3.55	16,695	3.37	35,044	7.07	31,561	6.37	5,969	1.20	140,719	28.37	59.88
Friuli-Venezia Giulia	245,636	42.56	128,302	22.23	55,529	9.62	38,593	6.69	43,898	7.61	17,333	3.00	17,177	2.98	9,428	1.63	21,296	3.68	57.04
Veneto	1,234,610	49.88	468,789	18.94	220,429	8.91	149,636	6.05	167,394	6.76	67,342	2.72	67,846	2.74	25,981	1.05	73,121	2.95	63.69
Emilia-Romagna	759,948	33.77	703,131	31.24	290,019	12.89	131,992	5.87	104,861	4.66	80,153	3.56	66,002	2.93	42,010	1.87	72,273	3.23	67.31
Tuscany	588,727	31.48	622,934	33.31	237,109	12.68	108,793	5.82	92,233	4.93	57,069	3.05	46,835	2.50	48,715	2.60	67,976	3.63	65.75
Umbria	171,458	38.18	107,687	23.98	65,718	14.63	28,828	6.42	29,551	6.58	12,062	2.69	7,846	1.75	9,427	2.10	16,497	4.00	67.69
Marche	291,061	37.98	170,596	22.26	141,239	18.43	42,381	5.53	44,644	5.83	21,430	2.80	17,210	2.25	12,517	1.63	25,225	3.29	62.13
Lazio	793,889	32.66	578,253	23.79	436,102	17.94	164,749	6.78	218,875	9.00	74,275	3.06	46,434	1.91	51,632	2.12	66,877	2.74	53.32
Abruzzo	205,370	35.31	98,665	16.96	130,513	22.44	54,631	9.39	40,724	7.00	13,907	2.39	9,124	1.57	10,396	1.79	18,313	3.15	52.61
Molise	36,544	24.26	22,058	14.64	43,330	28.76	23,060	15.31	9,534	6.33	2,130	1.41	1,724	1.14	3,189	2.12	9,077	6.03	53.27
Campania	419,623	19.21	417,396	19.11	739,541	33.85	298,254	13.65	127,211	5.82	55,055	2.52	32,869	1.50	40,300	1.84	54,355	2.50	47.61
Apulia	403,424	25.29	265,412	16.64	419,344	26.29	177,304	11.11	141,865	8.89	79,470	4.98	31,667	1.98	34,800	2.18	42,087	2.64	49.79
Basilicata	55,453	23.32	41,307	17.37	70,559	29.67	22,360	9.40	19,964	8.39	7,755	3.23	5,645	2.37	6,350	2.67	8,447	3.58	47.30
Calabria	164,915	22.61	133,136	18.25	194,695	26.69	97,135	13.32	76,835	10.26	13,557	1.86	11,088	1.52	15,736	2.16	24,240	3.33	43.99
Sicily	319,439	20.77	255,741	16.63	479,562	31.18	261,340	16.99	117,131	7.62	29,089	1.89	18,009	1.17	22,487	1.46	35,137	2.32	37.51
Sardinia	135,496	27.57	119,260	24.27	126,301	25.70	38.389	7.81	30.681	6.24	10.269	2.09	7,863	1.60	10,710	2.18	12,485	2.54	36.25
Abroad (EU)	21,570	17.86	39,502	32.71	16,561	13.71	7,208	5.97	2,957	2.45	10,679	8.84	11,814	9.78	4,851	4.02	5,627	4.66	7.64

By municipality (with more than 100,000 inhabitants)

Comuni	Lega		PD		M5S		FI		FdI		+E		EV		LS		Others		T/o
Comuni	No.	%	No.	%	No.	%	No.	%	No.	%	No.	%	No.	%	No.	%	No.	%	T/o
Ancona	12,126	28.51	12,981	30.52	7,712	18.13	2,023	4.76	2,356	5.54	1,477	3.47	1,528	3.59	1,166	2.74	1,166	2.74	54.77
Bari	36,195	21.84	33,814	20.40	45,847	27.66	17,218	10.39	11,402	6.88	8,681	5.24	3,674	2.22	4,091	2.47	4,826	2.90	66.73
Bergamo	20,246	32.41	20,391	32.64	4,247	6.80	5,280	8.45	4,142	6.63	3,218	5.15	1,983	3.17	1,084	1.74	1,876	3.01	70.24
Bologna	40,282	21.82	74,474	40.33	20,008	10.84	10,683	5.79	8,592	4.65	9,315	5.04	8,423	4.56	7,555	4.09	5,105	2.88	63.35
Bolzano	14,755	30.87	8,336	17.44	3,803	7.96	1,889	3.95	2,039	4.27	3,458	7.24	4,417	9.24	800	1.67	8,297	17.36	61.41
Brescia	31,285	35.36	27,356	30.92	7,306	8.26	6,736	7.61	4,853	5.49	3,643	4.12	2,989	3.38	1,709	1.93	2,593	2.93	63.13
Cagliari	12,741	22.71	17,389	30.99	10,632	18.95	5,047	8.99	4,155	7.40	1,798	3.20	1,185	2.11	1,792	3.19	1,375	2.46	44.07
Catania	17,256	18.95	17,674	19.41	30,447	33.44	12,380	13.59	7,083	7.78	1,234	1.36	1,309	1.44	1,773	1.95	1,907	2.08	37.11
Ferrara	27,783	36.65	22,002	29.03	7,894	10.41	4,247	5.60	4,384	5.78	3,447	4.55	2,459	3.24	1,277	1.68	2,309	3.06	73.04
Florence	38,931	20.26	83,959	43.70	18,735	9.75	10,581	5.51	10,084	5.25	9,502	4.95	7,332	3.82	7,280	3.79	5,737	2.97	69.90
Foggia	20,072	26.50	10,129	13.37	24,602	32.47	8,939	11.80	4,868	6.43	2,487	3.28	1,032	1.36	798	1.05	2,830	3.74	68.27
Forlì	19,606	32.25	19,959	32.83	7,588	12.48	4,183	6.88	2,645	4.35	1,953	3.21	1,693	2.78	944	1.55	2,232	3.67	69.61
Genoa	70,663	27.56	77,044	30.05	47,080	18.36	16,292	6.35	13,259	5.17	9,941	3.88	7,290	2.84	6,774	2.64	8,057	3.15	55.05
Giugliano in Campania	5,337	15.98	5,542	16.60	14,503	43.43	4,180	12.52	1,713	5.13	554	1.66	563	1.69	432	1.29	571	1.70	37.26
Latina	22,874	41.88	8,431	15.44	9,118	16.70	3,864	7.08	5,358	9.87	1,774	3.25	881	1.61	659	1.21	1,655	2.96	53.72
Livorno	20,997	25.17	29,248	35.06	13,706	16.43	3,441	4.12	3,484	4.18	2,329	2.79	2,685	3.22	2,711	3.25	4,819	5.78	64.38
Messina	12,338	18.32	11,709	17.38	16,974	25.20	13,223	19.63	5,951	8.83	2,823	4.19	740	1.10	984	1.46	2,619	3.89	36.66
Milan	157,227	27.39	206,468	35.97	48,958	8.53	58,457	10.18	29,618	5.16	30,573	5.33	17,977	3.13	12,147	2.12	12,528	2.19	58.70
Modena	24,834	26.10	37,915	39.85	11,202	11.77	5,323	5.59	4,416	4.64	3,544	3.72	3,513	3.69	1,898	1.99	2,500	2.65	70.94
Monza	19,147	33.72	16,516	29.09	5,174	9.11	6,185	10.89	3,342	5.89	2,668	4.70	1,710	3.01	688	1.21	1,354	2.38	61.18
Naples	36,657	12.36	69,074	23.29	118,221	39.86	27,109	9.14	13,122	4.42	9,352	3.15	6,512	2.20	9,827	3.31	6,746	2.27	40.03
Novara	16,393	35.64	11,893	25.86	5,458	11.87	3,980	8.65	4,001	8.70	1,428	3.10	996	2.17	476	1.03	1,367	2.98	61.32
Padua	33,225	33.23	31,860	31.87	8,799	8.80	6,042	6.04	6,401	6.40	4,887	4.89	3,995	4.00	2,204	2.20	2,557	2.57	64.05
Palermo	39,639	18.74	42,153	19.92	66,625	31.49	29,146	13.78	12,862	6.08	6,723	3.18	4,759	2.25	5,090	2.41	4,576	2.15	41.03
Parma	27,065	31.60	25,225	29.46	9,435	11.02	4,626	5.40	4,707	5.50	7,141	8.34	3,195	3.73	1,784	2.08	2,461	2.87	60.57
Perugia	27,354	31.57	22,930	26.47	11,483	13.25	6,198	7.15	7,754	8.95	2,973	3.43	2,295	2.65	2,087	2.41	3,565	4.12	71.35
Pescara	18,966	30.13	13,039	20.71	12,634	20.07	6,899	10.96	4,506	7.16	1,577	2.51	1,496	2.38	1,411	2.24	2,418	3.84	65.56
Piacenza	17,097	38.27	10,575	23.67	4,560	10.21	3,302	7.39	3,179	7.12	2,673	5.98	1,219	2.73	853	1.91	1,217	2.72	60.64
Prato	30,509	33.99	29,298	32.64	10,326	11.51	5,572	6.21	4,968	5.54	3,061	3.41	1,842	2.05	1,411	1.57	2,764	3.08	70.48
Ravenna	23,973	31.44	25,148	32.98	10,723	14.06	4,059	5.32	3,223	4.23	3,168	4.16	2,124	2.79	1,396	1.83	2,428	3.19	63.67
Reggio Calabria	12,741	22.41	13,828	24.32	12,012	21.13	6,933	12.19	6,622	11.65	932	1.64	1,296	2.28	794	1.40	1,695	3.00	41.11
Reggio Emilia	21,422	26.04	30,664	37.27	11,605	14.11	4,145	5.04	3,164	3.85	3,894	4.73	2,751	3.34	2,121	2.58	2,500	3.04	68.88
Rimini	23,058	34.21	18,094	26.85	10,219	15.16	4,980	7.39	3,455	5.13	2,221	3.30	2,263	3.36	1,216	1.80	1,889	2.80	58.60
Rome	285,318	25.78	338,885	30.62	194,545	17.58	61,638	5.57	96,299	8.70	44,310	4.00	24,614	2.22	31,731	2.87	29,504	2.66	48.91
Salerno	10,511	19.07	15,075	27.35	12,940	23.48	5,512	10.00	3,105	5.63	2,658	4.82	1,848	3.35	1,850	3.36	1,617	2.94	51.14
Sassari	11,265	25.48	12,269	27.75	11,699	26.46	2,755	6.23	2,146	4.85	1,278	2.89	769	1.74	775	1.75	1,260	2.85	42.76
Syracuse	6,227	17.94	7,217	20.79	12,123	34.93	2,932	8.45	3,832	11.04	551	1.59	545	1.57	623	1.79	658	1.90	35.77
Taranto	15,535	24.67	10,978	17.44	17,485	27.77	5,843	9.28	4,184	6.65	2,437	3.87	3,784	6.01	1,051	1.67	1,662	2.64	39.87
Terni	17,736	37.46	11,109	23.47	8,237	17.40	2,880	6.08	2,746	5.80	1,312	2.77	681	1.44	1,009	2.13	1,631	3.45	56.05
Trento	16,077	28.72	19,465	34.78	4,912	8.78	2,680	4.79	2,805	5.01	2,365	4.23	2,713	4.85	1,339	2.39	3,616	6.45	60.10
Trieste	27,911	33.13	21,476	25.49	9,821	11.66	5,891	6.99	6,099	7.24	3,404	4.04	3,632	4.31	2,489	2.95	3,533	4.20	50.96
Turin	106,567	26.89	132,639	33.47	52,803	13.33	31,373	7.92	21,739	5.49	18,135	4.58	10,936	2.76	8,970	2.26	13,073	3.30	60.95
Venice	42,093	37.07	31,521	27.76	13,966	12.30	5,551	4.89	5,574	4.91	4,418	3.89	4,482	3.95	2,592	2.28	3,356	2.95	57.61
Verona	44,620	37.06	30,418	25.26	11,634	9.66	7,621	6.33	10,513	8.73	5,247	4.36	4,565	3.79	2,087	1.73	3,691	3.08	62.20
Vicenza	19,504	38.47	14,341	28.29	4,339	8.56	3,046	6.01	3,144	6.20	2,112	4.17	2,114	4.17	775	1.53	1,324	2.60	59.16
Total	1,556,158	26.63	1,730,511	29.62	1,002,140	17.15	450,884	7.72	373,894	6.40	242,676	4.15	168,809	2.89	142,523	2.44	175,464	3.00	54.18

== See also ==
- 2019 European Parliament election
- 2019 European Parliament election in Lombardy
- 2019 European Parliament election in Piedmont
