= Ferrandino =

Ferrandino is a surname. Notable people with the surname include:

- Giuseppe Ferrandino (writer) (born 1958), Italian comic book author and novelist
- Giuseppe Ferrandino (politician) (born 1963), Italian MEP
- Mark Ferrandino (born 1977), American politician
