= Giuseppe Ferrandino =

Giuseppe Ferrandino may refer to:

- Giuseppe Ferrandino (politician)
- Giuseppe Ferrandino (writer)
