= Silvia Costa =

Silvia Costa may refer to:

- Silvia Costa (athlete) (born 1964), Cuban high jumper
- Silvia Costa (politician) (born 1949), Italian journalist and politician
