= 2019 European Parliament election in Piedmont =

The European Parliament election of 2019 took place in Italy on 26 May 2019.

In Piedmont Lega Nord came first with 37.1% of the vote (country-level result 34.3%), virtually 15pp more than the Democratic Party, which came second with 23.9%. The Five Star Movement came third with 13.3%, ahead of Forza Italia (9.1%), Brothers of Italy (6.0%), More Europe (3.3%), Green Europe (2.3%) and The Left (1.5%).

== Results ==
Party	Votes	%
Lega Nord	813,005	37.1
Democratic Party	524,078	23.9
Five Star Movement	290,141	13.3
Forza Italia	198,721	9.1
Brothers of Italy	130,986	6.0
The Left	76,526	3.5
More Europe	72,139	3.3
Green Europe	50,457	2.3
Others	141,669	2.9
Total	2,188,837	100.00

Source: Ministry of the Interior
