= 2019 European Parliament election in Lombardy =

The 2019 European Parliament election took place in Italy on 26 May 2019.

In Lombardy Lega Nord came first with 43.4% of the vote (country-level result 34.3%) and more than 20pp than the Democratic Party, which came second with 23.1%. The Five Star Movement came third with 9.3%, ahead of Forza Italia (8.7%), Brothers of Italy (5.5%), More Europe (3.1%), Green Europe (2.5%) and The Left (1.3%).

== Results ==
| Party | Votes | % |
|---|---|---|
| Lega Nord | 2,107,080 | 43.4 |
| Democratic Party | 1,120,933 | 23.1 |
| Five Star Movement | 453,863 | 9.3 |
| Forza Italia | 430,141 | 8.7 |
| Brothers of Italy | 268,414 | 5.5 |
| More Europe | 150,192 | 3.1 |
| Green Europe | 119,667 | 2.5 |
| The Left | 65,182 | 1.3 |
| others | 141,669 | 2.9 |
| Total | 4,857,141 | 100.00 |

Source: Ministry of the Interior
