= Renata Briano =

Italian politician and activist

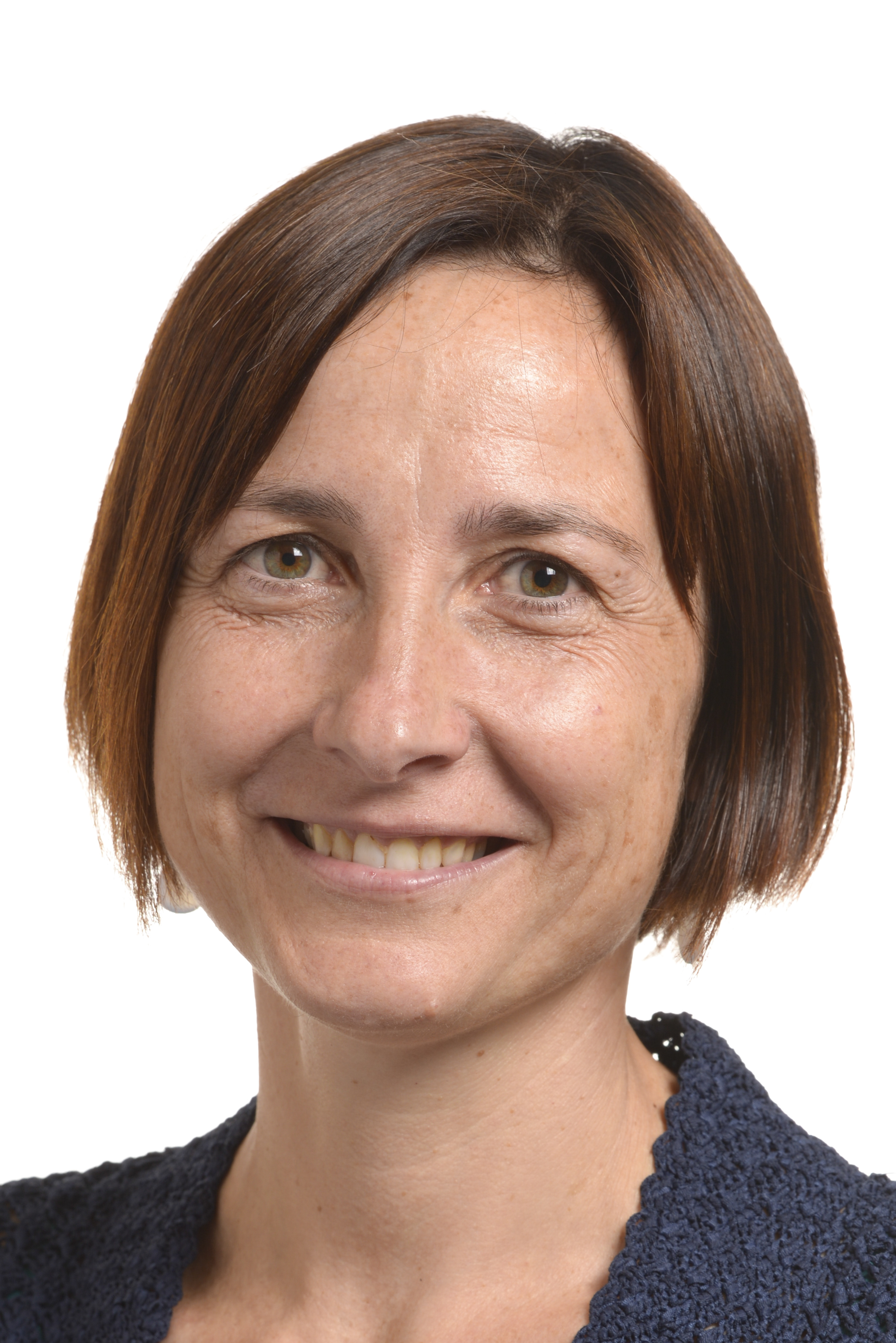

Member of the European Parliament
- In office 25 May 2014 – 26 May 2019
- Constituency: North-West Italy

Personal details
- Born: 23 February 1964 (age 62) Genoa, Italy
- Party: Democratic Party

Renata Briano (born 23 February 1964) is an Italian politician and activist who served as a member of the European Parliament from 2014 to 2019 for the Democratic Party.

== Biography ==
Born in Genoa in 1964, she graduated in Natural Sciences and has held positions at the National Institute for Educational Technologies of the CNR and at ARPA Liguria.

From 2000 to 2010, she was Councilor for the Environment and Sustainable Development, Hunting and Fishing for the Province of Genoa. From 2010 to 2014, she held the position of Councilor for the Environment and Civil Protection for the Liguria Regional Council.

She ran in the 2014 European Parliament election in the North-West constituency, and was elected via open list with 46,960 preferential votes. In the European Parliament, she was rapporteur for fisheries-related tourism. On 28 March 2019, she announced she would not stand in the 2019 European Parliament election.

== See also ==
- List of members of the European Parliament for Italy, 2014–2019
