= Danilo Oscar Lancini =

Italian politician (born 1965)

Danilo Oscar Lancini MEP
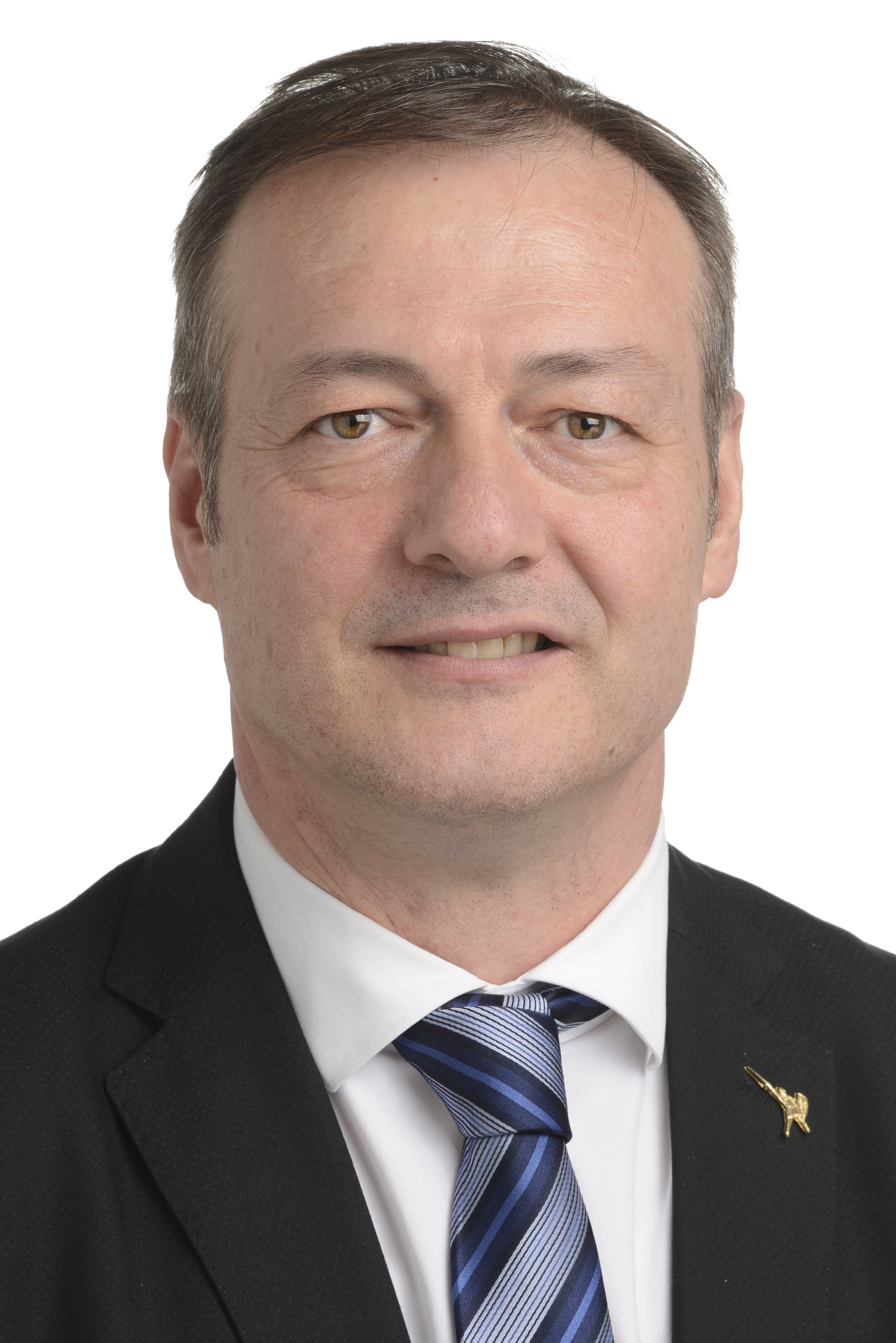

Member of the European Parliament for North-West Italy
- Incumbent
- Assumed office 17 April 2018

Personal details
- Party: League

Danilo Oscar Lancini (born 15 October 1965 in Rovato) is an Italian politician.

He served as Mayor of Adro from 2004 to 2014.

On 17 April 2018 he became MEP, taking over from Matteo Salvini. He was re-elected MEP in the 2019 European Parliament election.
