= Aldo Patriciello =

Italian politician

Aldo Patriciello (born 27 September 1957 in Venafro) is an Italian politician.

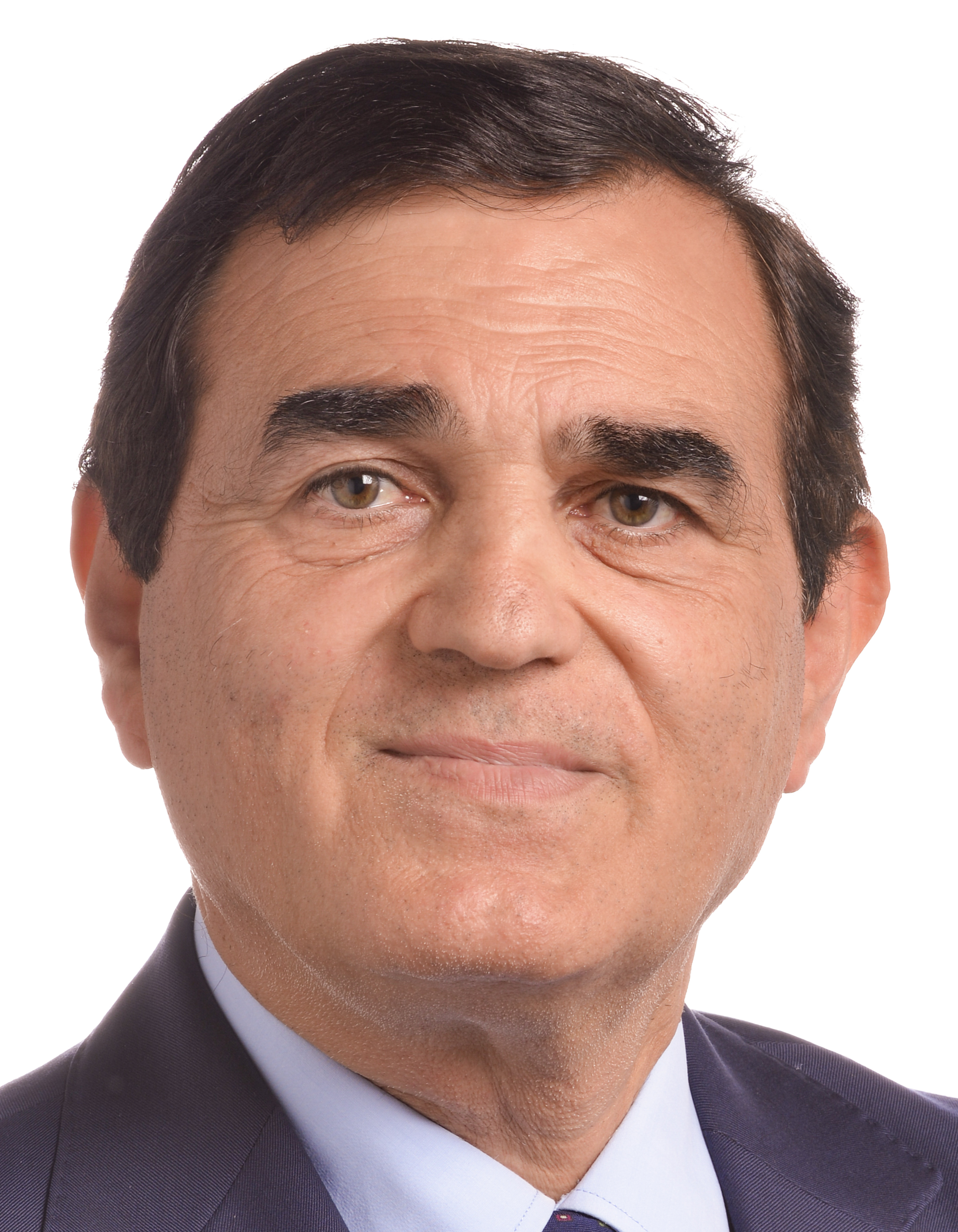

A former Vice President of Molise, a region in southern Italy, he has been a member of the European Parliament since 8 May 2006, when he took the place of Lorenzo Cesa, elected to the Chamber of Deputies in the 2006 Italian general election. Having first run for the European Parliament in 2004, Patriciello was re-elected in 2009, 2014 and 2019.

Patriciello started his political career within Christian Democracy in 1979. After the party's dissolution in 1994, he successively joined the Italian People's Party, European Democracy, the Union of the Centre, Forza Italia, The People of Freedom, the new Forza Italia and, finally, since January 2024, Lega.

After being convicted to four months for illegal financing, Patriciello was never jailed.
