= Isabella Adinolfi =

Italian politician (born 1978)

Isabella Adinolfi MEP
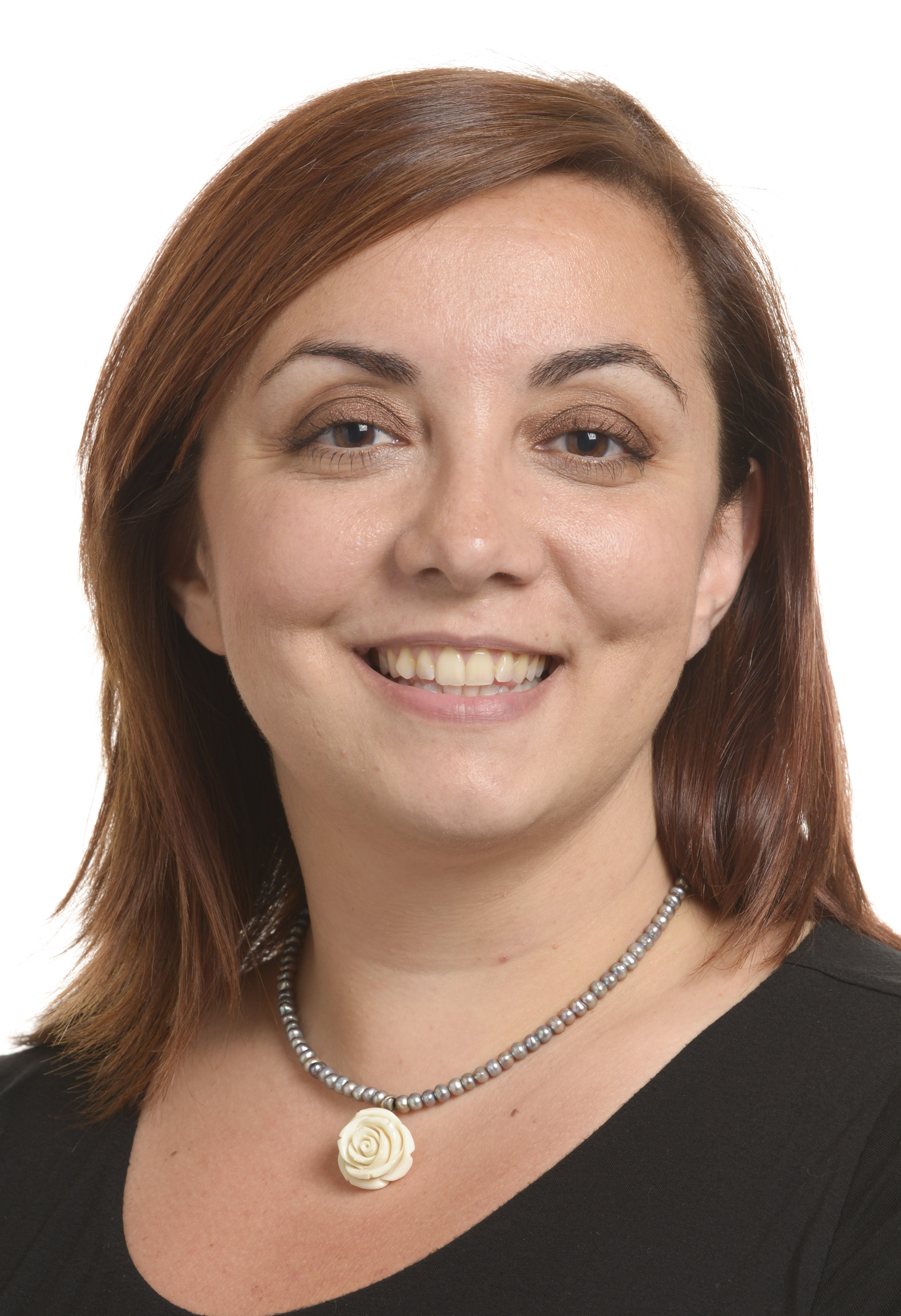

Member of the European Parliament
- Incumbent
- Assumed office 1 July 2014
- Constituency: Southern Italy

Personal details
- Born: 27 March 1978 (age 48) Nocera Inferiore, Campania, Italy
- Party: Forza Italia (from July 2021)
- Other political affiliations: Five Star Movement (until 2021)

Isabella Adinolfi (born 27 March 1978) is an Italian politician and a member of the European Parliament from Italy since 2014. She was a member of Five Star Movement, part of the Europe for Freedom and Democracy until July 2021 when she joined Forza Italia.

== Biography ==
She graduated in Conservation of Cultural Heritage with a thesis on the restoration of archaeological wood, subsequently obtaining a master's degree in Local Sustainable Development.

=== Political activity ===
Adinolfi was a candidate of the Five Star Movement for the Southern Italy constituency in the 2014 European Parliament election. She won the election to the European Parliament, receiving 67,477 votes.

In the 2019 European Parliament election, she was the top candidate on the party list.
