= Tiziana Beghin =

Italian politician (born 1971)

Tiziana Beghin MEP
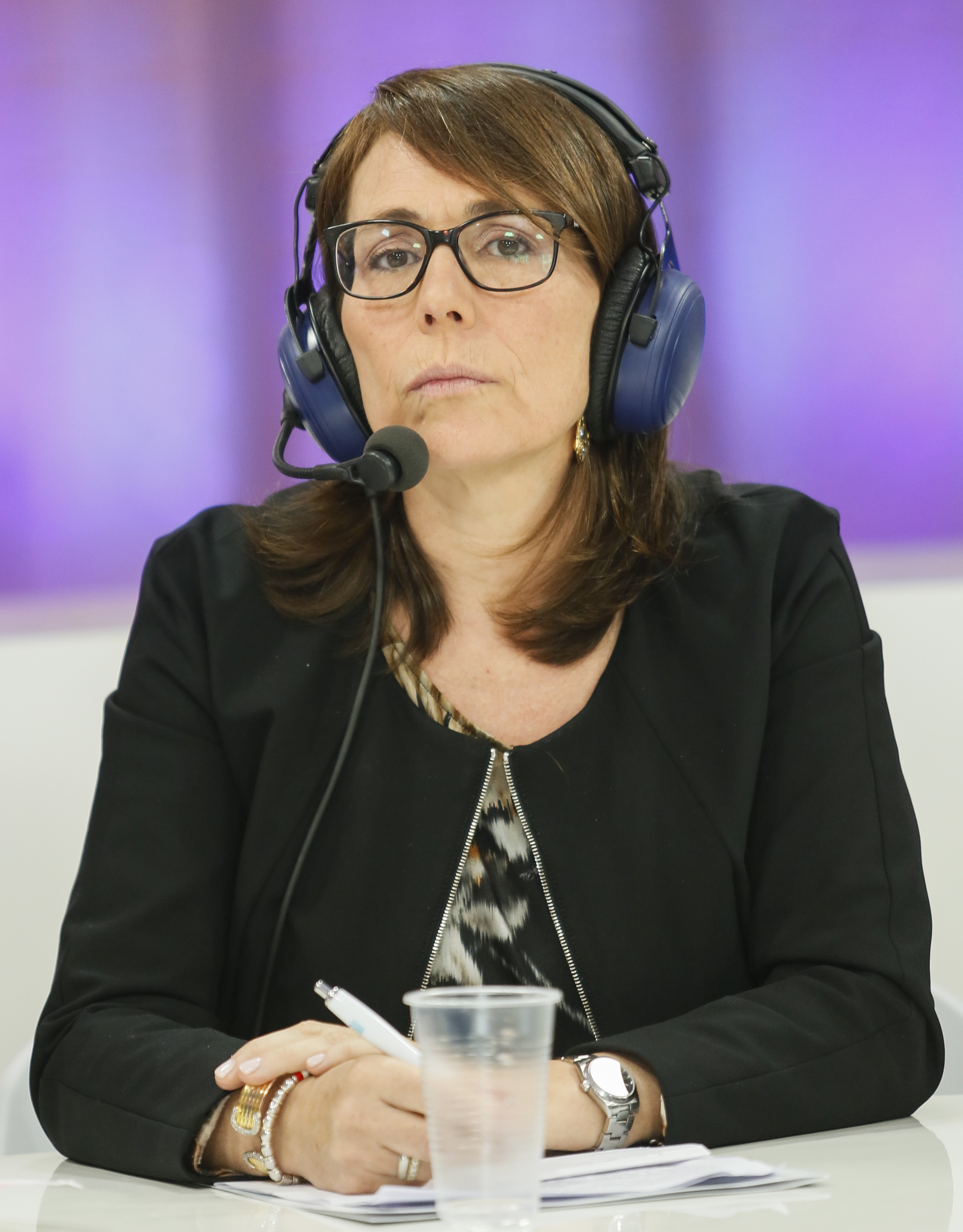

Member of the European Parliament for North-West Italy
- In office 1 July 2014 – 16 July 2024

Personal details
- Born: 4 February 1971 (age 55) Genoa, Italy
- Party: Five Star Movement
- Education: University of Genoa
- Occupation: Financial advisor

Tiziana Beghin (born 4 February 1971, in Genoa) is an Italian politician who was elected as a Member of the European Parliament in 2014 and re-elected in 2019.

== Biography ==
After completing her high school studies, Beghin graduated in economics and business at the University of Genoa, subsequently specializing in Human Resources & Management after a period dedicated to professional activity in an accounting and auditor firm. From 2005 to 2014 she provided consultancy to SMEs for business development through staff training.

In the 2014 European elections Beghin ran for the European Parliament, among the lists of the Five Star Movement in the north-western Italian constituency, being elected MEP with 22,485 preferences. In the 2019 European elections she ran for a second term, being re-elected with 15,039 votes.
