= Laura Ferrara =

Italian politician (born 1983)

Laura Ferrara MEP
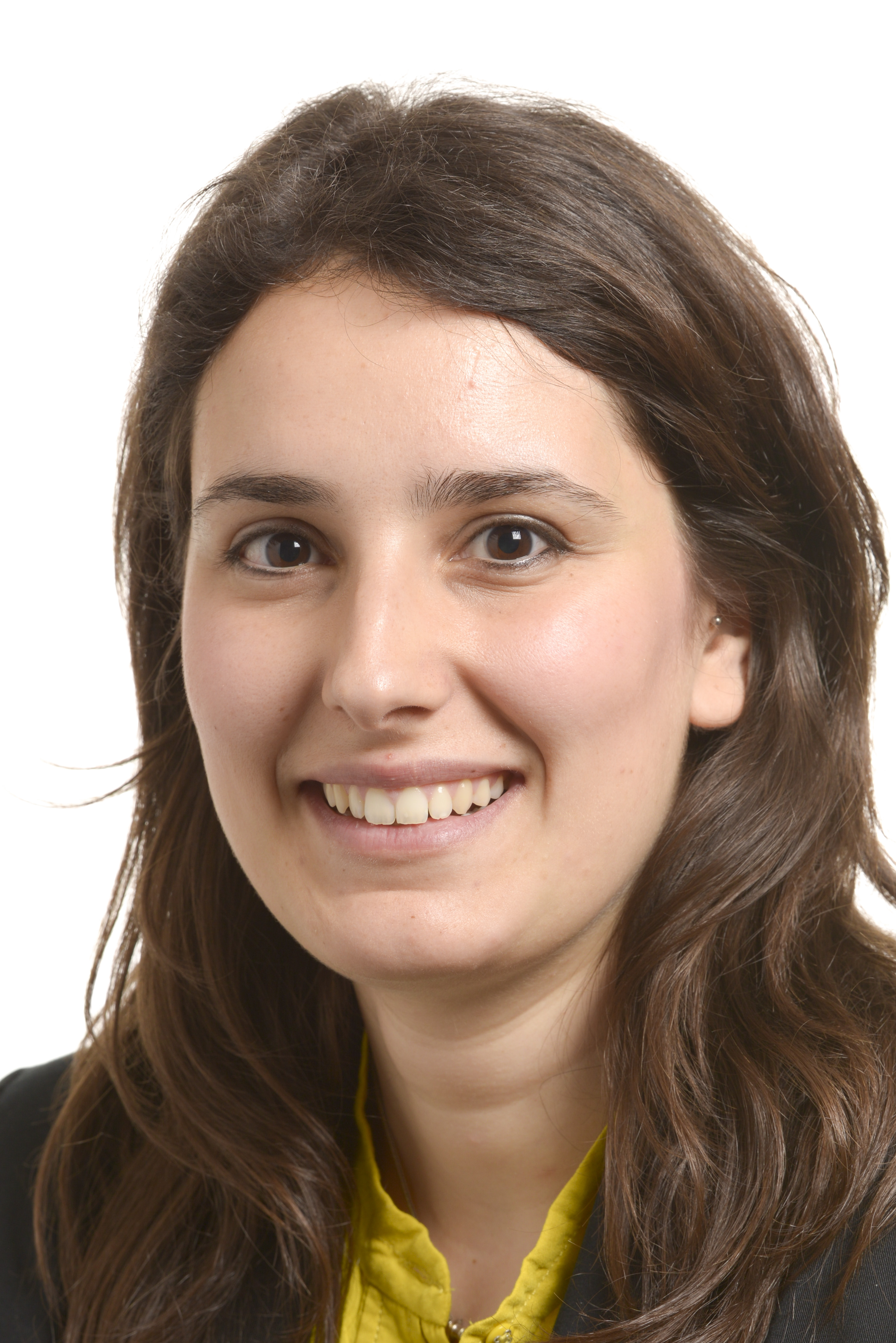

Member of the European Parliament for Southern Italy
- Incumbent
- Assumed office 1 July 2014

Personal details
- Born: 11 September 1983 (age 43) Naples, Italy
- Party: Five Star Movement
- Education: University of Calabria (bachelor's degree); University of Bologna (master's degree); University of Florence (PhD)
- Profession: Lawyer

Laura Ferrara (born 11 September 1983) is an Italian politician. Born in Naples, she was a lawyer before joining the Five Star Movement (M5S) in 2014. That same year, she was elected as a member of the European Parliament and was re-confirmed on 2019.
