= Damiano Zoffoli =

Italian politician (born 1960)

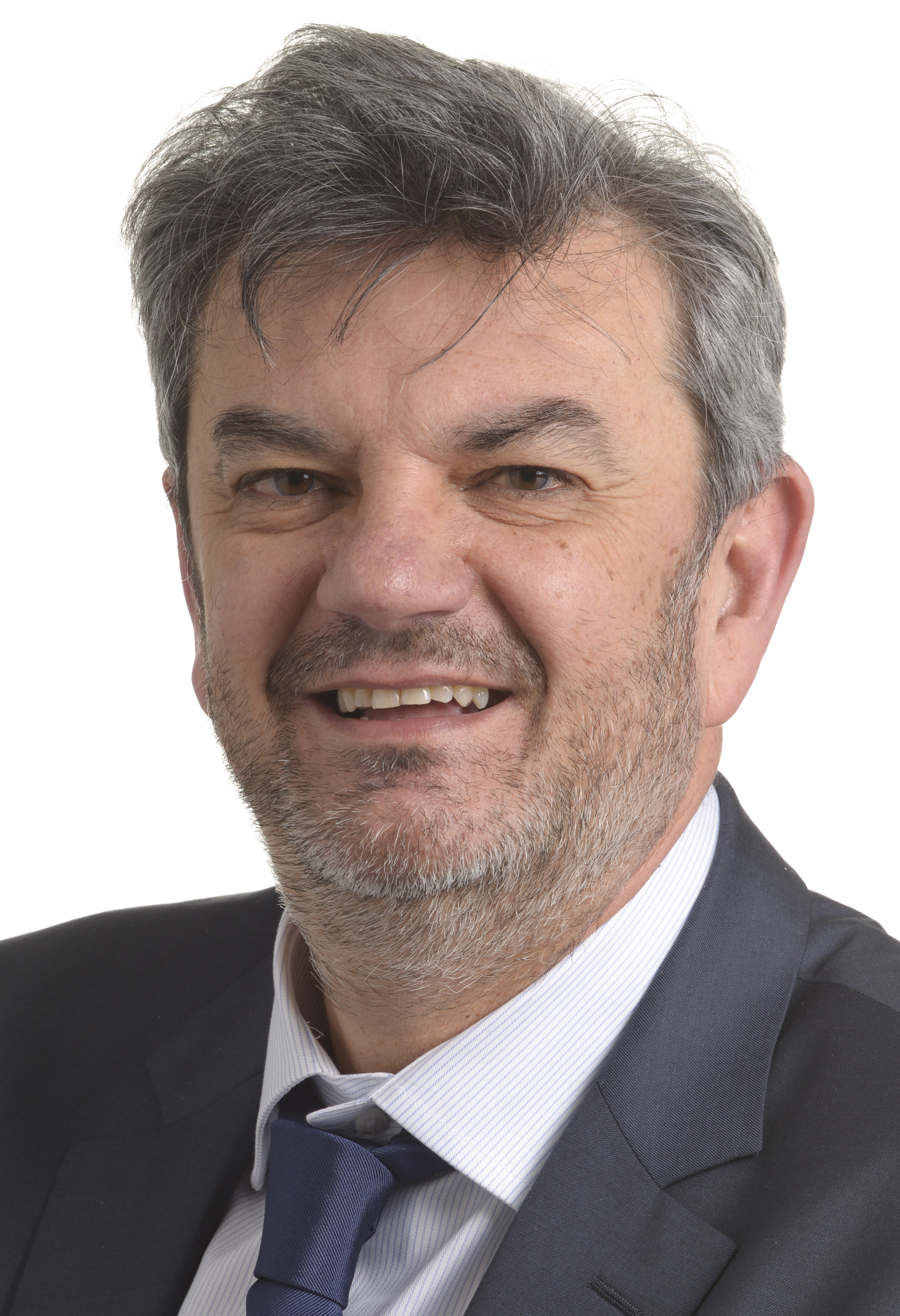

Member of the European Parliament
- In office 18 February 2015 – 2 July 2019
- Preceded by: Alessandra Moretti
- Constituency: North-East Italy

Personal details
- Born: 17 July 1960 (age 65) Cesenatico, Italy
- Party: Democratic Party

Damiano Zoffoli (17 July 1960) is an Italian politician. He was from 1997 to 2005 mayor of Cesenatico for the Christian-leftist Italian People's Party and The Daisy. In February 2015 he replaced Alessandra Moretti as a Member of the European Parliament (MEP) representing the Democratic Party in the constituency of North East Italy.

In parliament, Zoffoli has been a member of the Progressive Alliance of Socialists and Democrats group. Since 2015, he has been a member of the Committee on the Environment, Public Health and Food Safety. In addition to his committee assignments, has been serving as vice-chairman of the parliament's delegation for relations with Iran.

== Biography ==
A graduate of the University of Bologna with a degree in medicine and surgery, Zoffoli is a dentist and has worked as an educator in Catholic youth groups. Active in the PPI during the 1990s, he began his political career in 1997, when he was elected mayor of his hometown, Cesenatico. He served two terms in office until 2005, when he was elected regional councilor for Legislative Assembly of Emilia-Romagna, a position to which he was re-elected in the subsequent regional elections of 2010. In the Regional Assembly, he served as Chair of the Economic Policy Committee and later of the Territory, Environment, and Mobility Committee.

In 2014, he ran in the European elections as a candidate for the Democratic Party (Italy) in the Northeast Italy constituency, receiving 52,233 votes and finishing as the top non-elected candidate in the constituency. On February 18, 2015, following the resignation of Alessandra Moretti (who was running for President of the Veneto Region), he was sworn in as a Member of the European Parliament, a position he held until the end of the legislative term.

== See also ==
- 2014 European Parliament election in Veneto
