= Isabella De Monte =

Italian politician (born 1971)

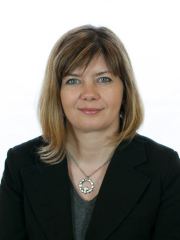
- De Monte in 2013

Member of the Chamber of Deputies
- Incumbent
- Assumed office 13 October 2022
- Constituency: Friuli-Venezia Giulia – 01

Personal details
- Born: 23 June 1971 (age 55)
- Party: Forza Italia (since 2024)

Isabella De Monte (born 23 June 1971) is an Italian politician serving as a member of the Chamber of Deputies since 2022. From 2014 to 2019, she was a member of the European Parliament. From 2013 to 2014, she was a member of the Senate.

== Biography ==
Born in Udine, she grew up in Pontebba (near the border with Austria and Slovenia), After earning her diploma in accounting from the ITCG Giuseppe Marchetti in Gemona del Friuli, she received her law degree from the University of Trieste with a grade of 102/110, defending a thesis in commercial law titled “The Right to Dividends in S.p.A.s.”

Admitted to the Udine Bar Association, she began her political career in 1999: she was elected to the Pontebba City Council on a civic slate and later became deputy mayor. A city council member since 2004, she was elected mayor of Pontebba in 2009.
