= Laura Agea =

Italian politician

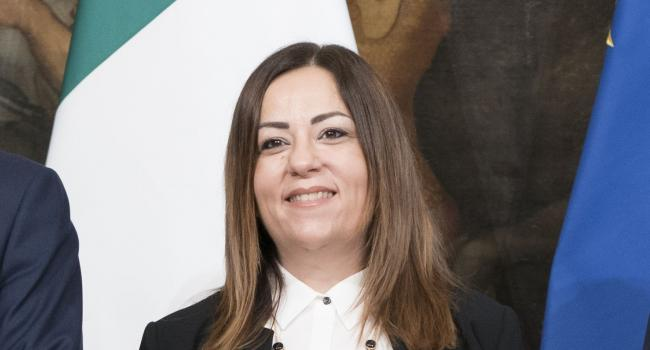

Member of the European Parliament
- In office 1 July 2014 – 2 July 2019
- Constituency: Central Italy

Personal details
- Born: 17 February 1978 (age 48) Narni, Italy
- Party: Italian; Five Star Movement; EU; Europe for Freedom and Democracy
- Education: University of Urbino

Laura Agea (born 17 February 1978) is an Italian politician and Member of the European Parliament from Italy. She is a member of Five Star Movement, part of the Europe for Freedom and Democracy.
