= Stefano Maullu =

Italian politician (born 1962)

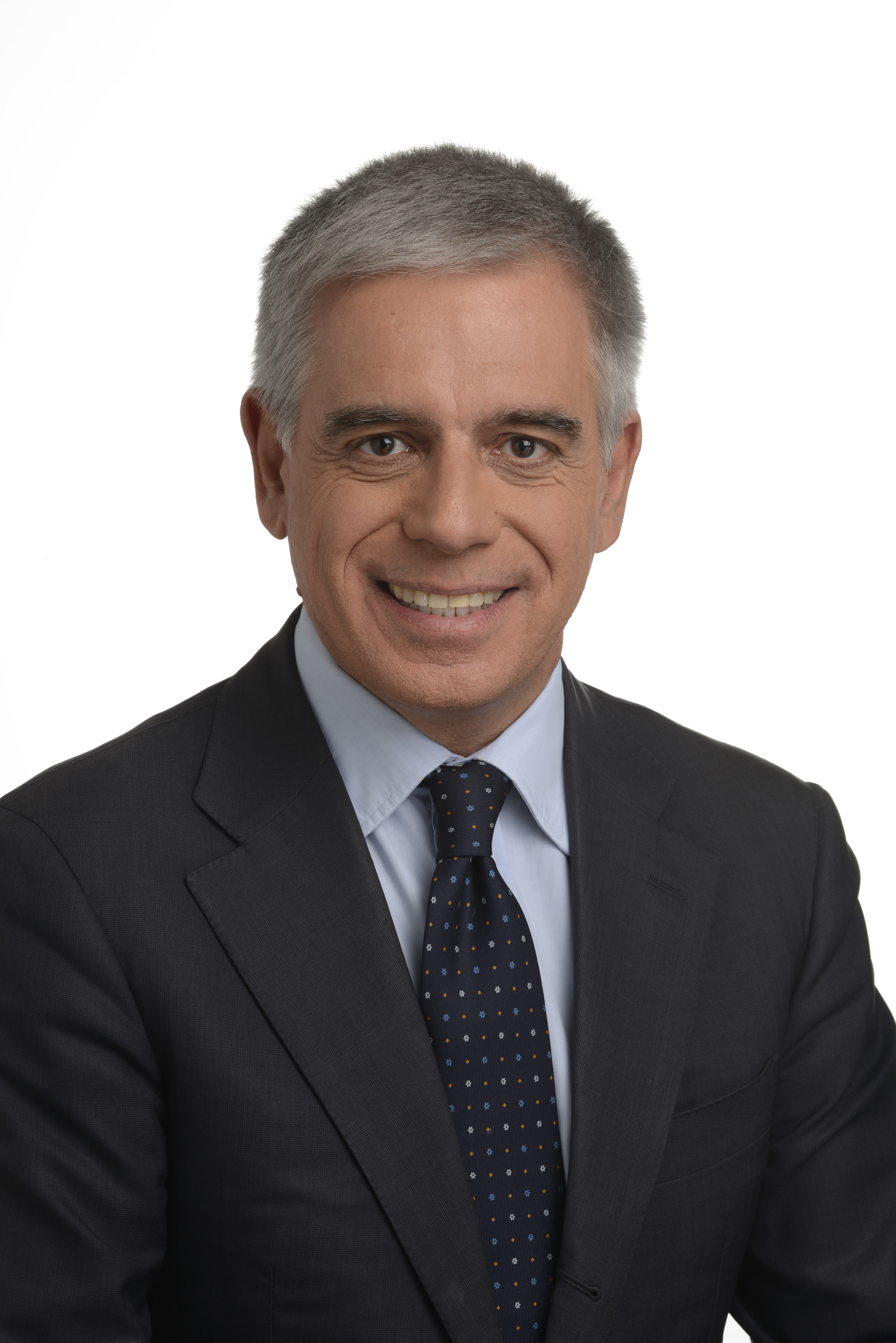

Member of the Chamber of Deputies
- Incumbent
- Assumed office 13 October 2022
- Constituency: Lombardy 1

Member of the European Parliament for North-West Italy
- In office 13 July 2015 – 2 July 2019

Personal details
- Born: 15 March 1962 (age 64) Milan, Lombardy, Italy
- Party: Brothers of Italy (2018–present)
- Other political affiliations: FI (until 2009); PdL (2009–2013); FI (2013–2018)

Stefano Giovanni Maullu (born 15 March 1962) is an Italian politician of Brothers of Italy who was elected member of the Chamber of Deputies in 2022. From 2015 to 2019, he served as member of the European Parliament.
