= Angelo Ciocca =

Italian politician (born 1975)

Angelo Ciocca MEP
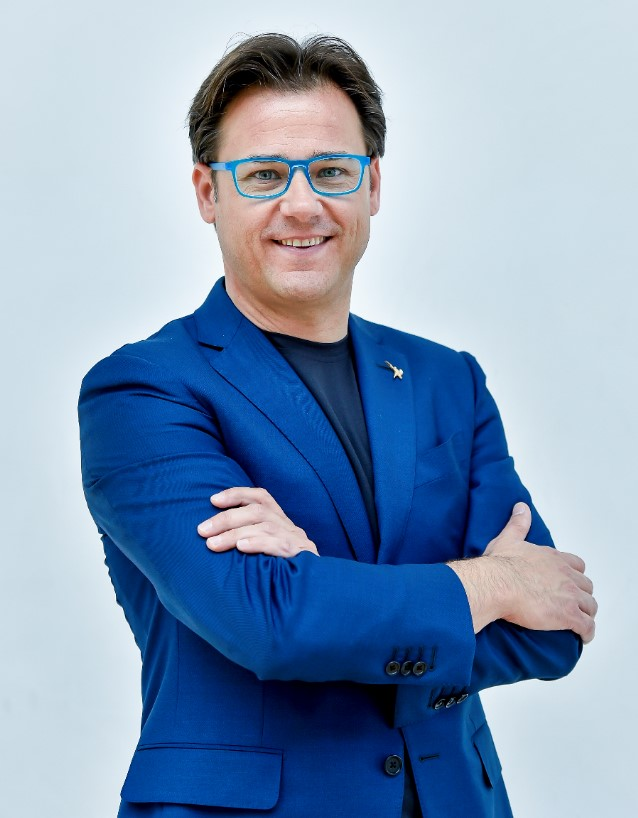

Member of the European Parliament for North-West Italy
- In office 7 July 2016 – 15 July 2024

Personal details
- Born: 28 June 1975 (age 50) Pavia, Italy
- Party: League

Angelo Ciocca (born 28 June 1975) is an Italian politician and former member of the European Parliament.

== Career ==
On 7 July 2016, Ciocca succeeded at the European Parliament to Gianluca Buonanno, who died on 5 June in a car crash. On 23 October 2018, he trampled on a letter from the EU Commissioner for Economic and Monetary Affairs Pierre Moscovici on the rejection of the Italian government financial law, boasting then the gesture in that the shoe had been produced in Italy, even if he still getting a salary from the Commission.

== Controversies and judicial proceedings ==
Ciocca had been suspected of consorting with the Italian criminal organisation 'Ndrangheta in Pavia in 2009.

In January 2019, Ciocca was sentenced to 1 year and 6 months (with conditional suspension of the sentence and non-mention) as part of the penal trial concerning the Lombardy Region reimbursement scandal.
