= Marco Affronte =

Italian politician

Marco Affronte MEP
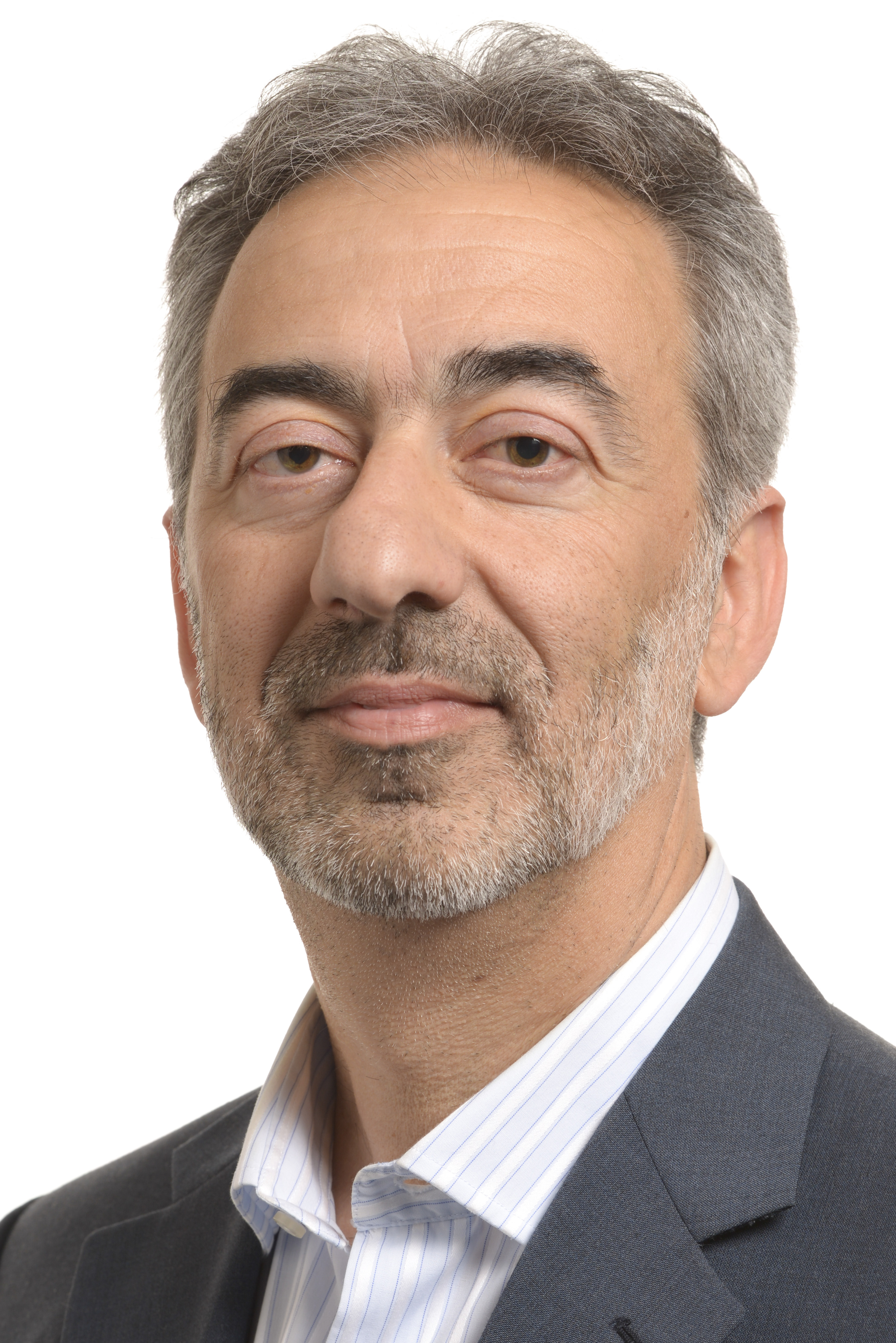

Member of the European Parliament for Southern Italy
- In office 1 July 2014 – 2 July 2019

Personal details
- Born: 6 May 1965 (age 60) Rimini, Italy
- Party: Italian; Five Star Movement ( - 2017); Federation of the Greens (2019-); EU; European Green Party
- Website: www.marcoaffronte.it

Marco Affronte (born 6 May 1965) is an Italian politician and former Member of the European Parliament from Italy. Formerly a member of Five Star Movement, he is also part of the Greens–European Free Alliance group in the European Parliament. He is an individual member of the European Green Party.

Affronte studied natural sciences at the University of Bologna. He was elected at the 2014 European Parliament election as part of the Five Star Movement and subsequently became member of the committee on Environment, Public Health and Food Safety, the Fisheries committee, the delegation to the Turkey-EU Joint Parliamentary Committee and the Delegation to the EU-Albania Stabilisation and Association Parliamentary Committee. In January 2017 he announced that he will leave the Five Star Movement to join the Greens/EFA parliamentary group as an independent member.
