= Giuseppe Ferrandino (writer) =

Italian comic book author and novelist

- Born: 24 January 1958 (age 68); Ischia, Italy
- Occupation: Writer
- Known for: Italian comic book authoring and novel writing.

Giuseppe Ferrandino (born 24 January 1958) is an Italian comic book author and novelist.

Ferrandino studied medicine at the University of Naples without completing his degree, but following instead his passion of working as a comic strip scriptwriter. At the end of the seventies, he produced a series of renowned scripts, for publications such as Nero, Lanciostory, Dylan Dog, and Mickey Mouse, reaching the peak of his scriptwriting popularity in the 1980s.

In 1993, his novel Pericle il nero (Pericles the Black Man) was published by Granata Press, hardly noticed by the Italian readership. However, after being translated into French by Gallimard, the novel was republished in 1998 in Italy by Adelphi Edizioni, with great success. The story is constructed as an American noir, with a realistic Neapolitan dialect and strong characters, often verging on the grotesque as represented by the pulp literary genre.

In 1999, his second novel, Il rispetto, ovvero Pino Pentecoste contro i guappi (Respect, or Pino Pentecoste against the Blabbermouths), was published by Adelphi, followed by the fairy tale Lidia e i turchi (Lydia and the Turks) published by Mondadori. Other successful novels have been published by Ferrandino, among which Spada (Sword) (2007), a reprise of Dumas' Three Musketeers.

In 2007 American director Abel Ferrara produced the film version of Ferrandino's 1st novel, with Italian actor Riccardo Scamarcio in the starring role.

Ferrandino lives in Rome, although he often spends lengthy periods in Chicago.

== Bibliography ==
- Pericle il Nero, Granata Press, 1993 (in Italian)
  - Périclès le Noir, Gallimard, 1995 (in French)
  - Pericle il Nero, Adelphi, 1998 (in Italian)
  - Pericle der Schwarze, Suhrkamp, 2000 (in German)
  - Pericles de Zwarte, Amsterdam, 2001 (in Dutch)
  - Pericle den svarte, Oslo, 2002 (in Norwegian)
- Il rispetto (ovvero Pino Pentecoste contro i guappi), Adelphi, 1999 (in Italian)
  - Respekt oder Pino Pentecoste gegen die Maulhelden, Suhrkamp, 2001 (in German)
  - Le respect : Pino Pentecoste contre les camorristes, Gallimard, 2004 (in French)
- Lidia e i Turchi, Mondadori, 1999 (in Italian)
- Saverio del Nord Ovest, Bompiani, 2001 (in Italian)
- Cento modi per salvarsi la vita con un pacchetto di sigarette senza fumarlo, Bompiani, 2001 (in Italian)
- Spada, Mondadori, 2007 (in Italian)
- Rosmunda l'inglese, Mondadori, 2008 (in Italian)
