= Giulia Moi =

Italian politician (born 1971)

Giulia Moi MEP
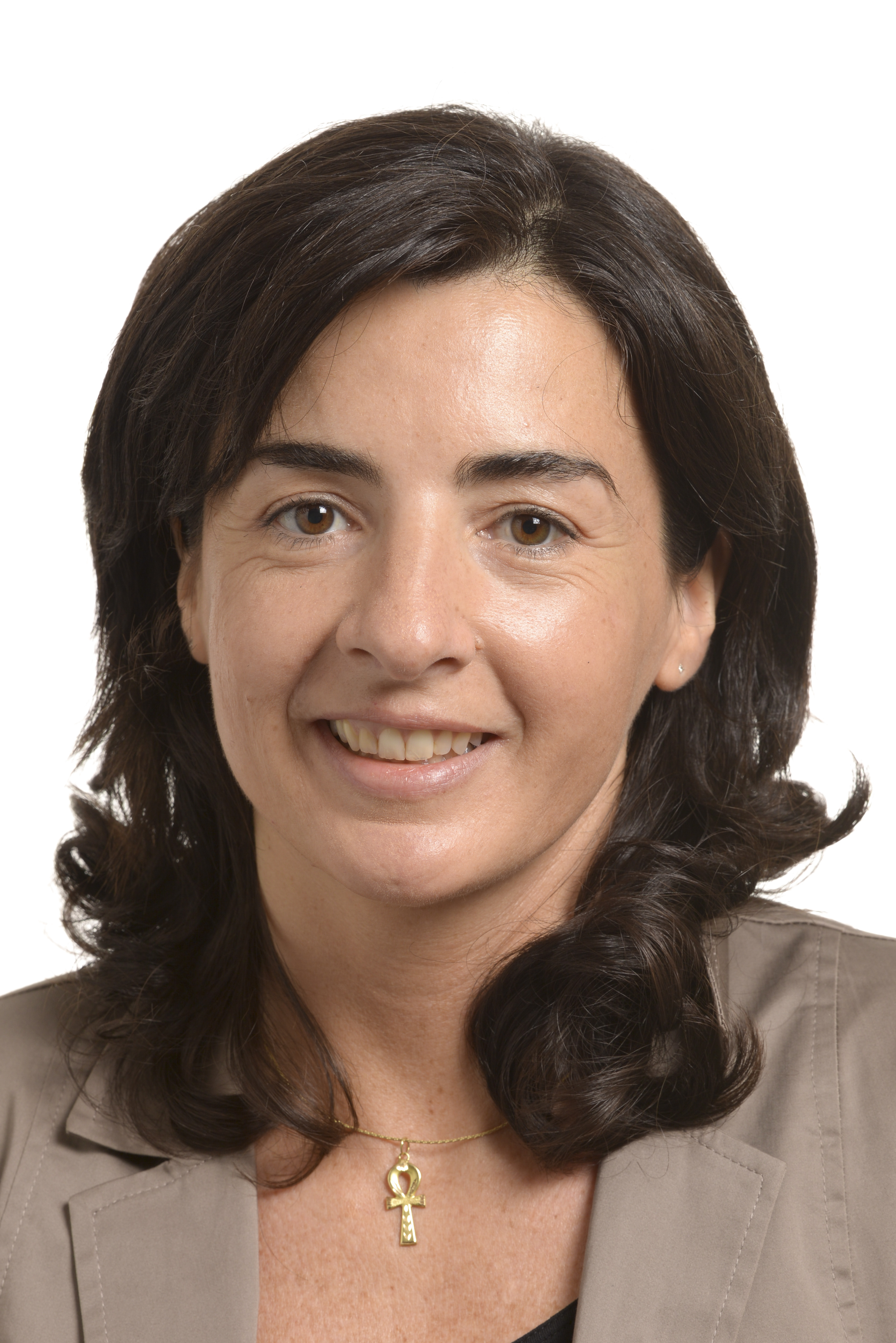

Member of the European Parliament for Italian Islands
- In office 2014–2019

Personal details
- Born: May 24, 1971 (age 55) Cagliari, Italy
- Party: Five Star Movement
- Education: University of Cagliari; King's College London

Giulia Moi (born 24 May 1971) is an Italian Member of the European Parliament for the Five Star Movement. She was elected in 2014.

She graduated with a degree in biology from the University of Cagliari and completed a PhD at King's College London entitled "Chemistry and Biological Activity of Kigelia pinnata Relevant to Skin Conditions".

She joined the Five Star Movement, with which she was elected at the 2014 European elections.

== Biography ==
She earned a bachelor's degree in Biological Sciences from the University of Cagliari, and subsequently received a Ph.D. from King's College London, with a dissertation titled “Chemistry and Biological Activity of Kigelia pinnata Relevant to Skin Conditions.”

In 2010, she ran in the Cagliari provincial elections on the Christian People's Union ticket, in support of center-left candidate Graziano Milia, and received 16 votes.

She later joined the Five Star Movement and was elected to the European Parliament on its ticket in the 2014 European elections, sparking internal controversy that later became the subject of legal proceedings . On December 31, 2018, she was ultimately expelled from the Five Star Movement by decision of the Disciplinary Committee following disciplinary proceedings at the European Parliament, against which an appeal is pending .

Moi investigated alleged abuses by a Sardinian training organization funded with one million euros in European funds. The organization was the subject of an investigation in 2013 following a complaint she filed and subsequently sued her over her 2011 statements. In a ruling dated July 23, 2020, the Criminal Court of Cagliari convicted her of defamation and ordered her to pay a fine of 800 euros and 60,000 euros in damages—15,000 euros to each of the four civil parties.

As a member of the European Parliament’s Committee on Agriculture (AGRI), Moi served as rapporteur, alongside Renate Sommer, for the directive on the cloning of cattle, pigs, sheep, goats, and horses bred and reproduced for agricultural purposes. She was also at the center of a heated debate within the same committee regarding a European Commission proposal on Genetically modified organism, which was ultimately rejected by the European Parliament’s plenary session on October 28, 2015, following a motion by the lead rapporteur, Giovanni La Via, and with the support of a nearly unanimous committee.

After her stint in the European Parliament, Giulia Moi founded the Sustainable Progress movement, which—in the run-up to the 2024 European elections—initially joined Libertà, an electoral list promoted by Cateno De Luca of South calls North, but later withdrew before the lists were filed.
