= Nicola Caputo =

Italian politician (born 1966)

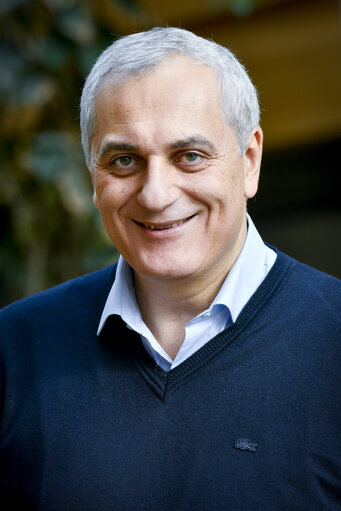
- Caputo in 2018

Member of the European Parliament for Southern Italy
- In office 1 July 2014 – 1 July 2019
- Parliamentary group: Progressive Alliance of Socialists and Democrats

Personal details
- Born: 4 March 1966 (age 60) Teverola, Italy
- Party: Forza Italia (from 2025)
- Other political affiliations: PD (until 2019); Italia Viva (2019-2025)

Nicola Caputo (born 4 March 1966) is an Italian politician who was a member of the European Parliament (MEP) from 2014 to 2019.

== Early life and career ==
Caputo was born in Teverola, in the province of Caserta, on 4 March 1966. Caputo's political career began in the 1990s when he became a Consigliere comunale for the comune of Teverola, he held at various times the position of Assessore for finances, education and productive activities. Between 2005 and 2014, he served two consecutive terms as a regional councillor for Campania. During his term he led a special commission on transparency and the use of money.

== Member of the European Parliament ==
From 2014 to 2019, Caputo was a MEP, representing Southern Italy for Italy's leading centre-left coalition party, the Democratic Party (PD), and was part of the Progressive Alliance of Socialists and Democrats. During this period, he was part of the Delegation for relations with the United States. In 2016, he was the MEP with the highest attendance in the European Parliament, missing only one of 3,103 possible votes. He was also a member of the European Parliament Committee on Agriculture and Rural Development.

Caputo stood for re-election in the European Parliament in 2019 but was not elected. In July 2019, he was nominated by Vincenzo De Luca as a councillor for agriculture, European affairs, and international relations. That same year, he left the PD and joined Italia Viva (IV). On 27 October 2020, he was nominated assessor for agricultural policy at the Giunta regionale della Campania. Starting in 2021, he served as an alternate member of the Committee of Regions.

Caputo stood again for election the European Parliament in 2024 as part of the United States of Europe electoral list, again for Southern Italy; however, he was not elected after the list failed to pass the 4% electoral threshold. On 4 October 2025, he resigned as assessore for agricultural policy, and a few days later defected to the centre-right coalition party Forza Italia (FI). In December 2025, he was nominated consigliere for export and internationalization of food processing supply chains and for European policies by the minister of foreign affairs Antonio Tajani.
