= Giancarlo Scottà =

Italian politician from Veneto

Giancarlo Scottà (born 11 April 1953, in Vittorio Veneto) is an Italian politician from Veneto.

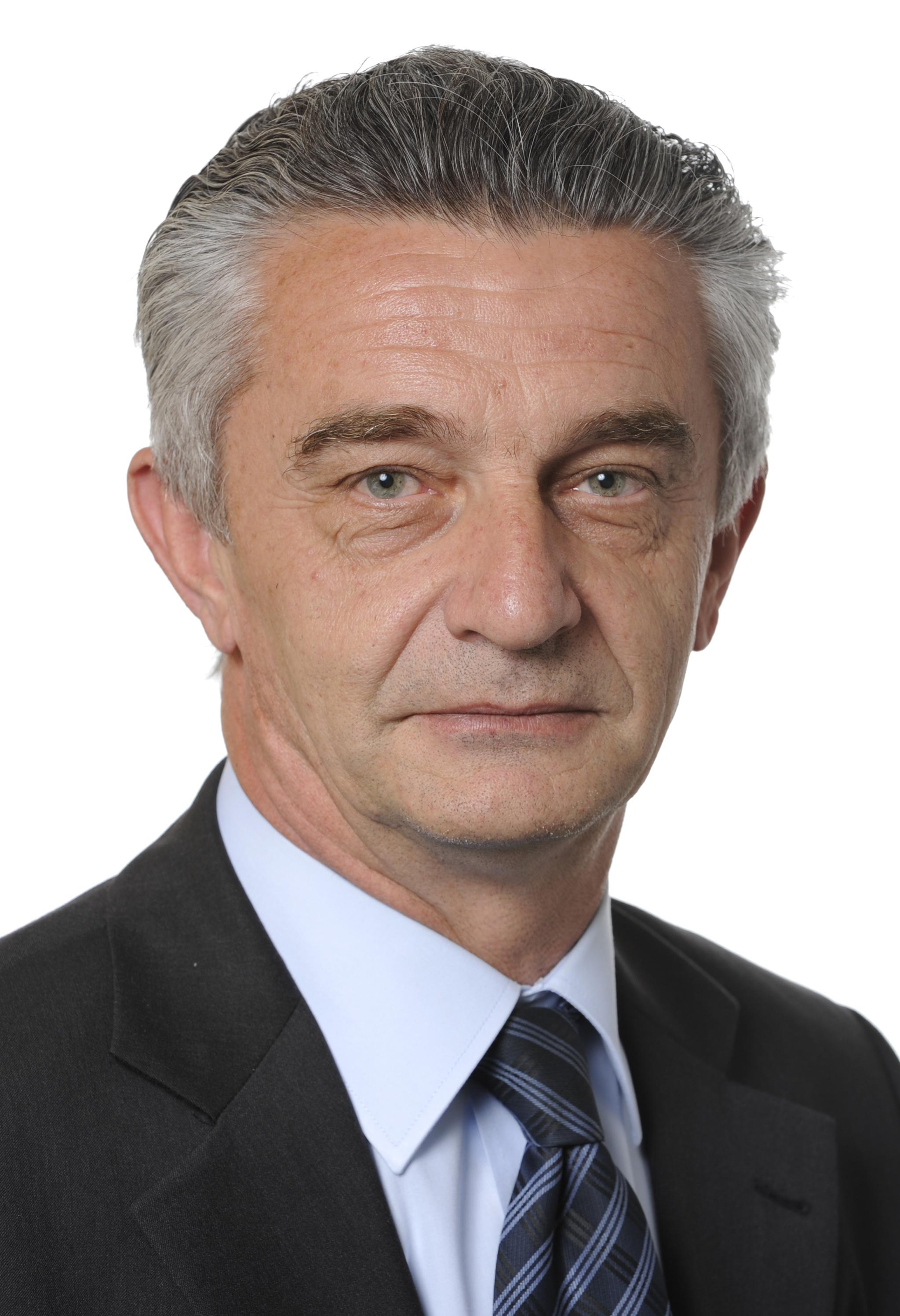

A member of Liga Veneta-Lega Nord, Scottà was Mayor of Vittorio Veneto from 1999 to 2009. At the 2009 European election he was elected to the European Parliament.
