= Giuseppe Ferrandino (politician) =

Italian politician

Giuseppe Ferrandino MEP
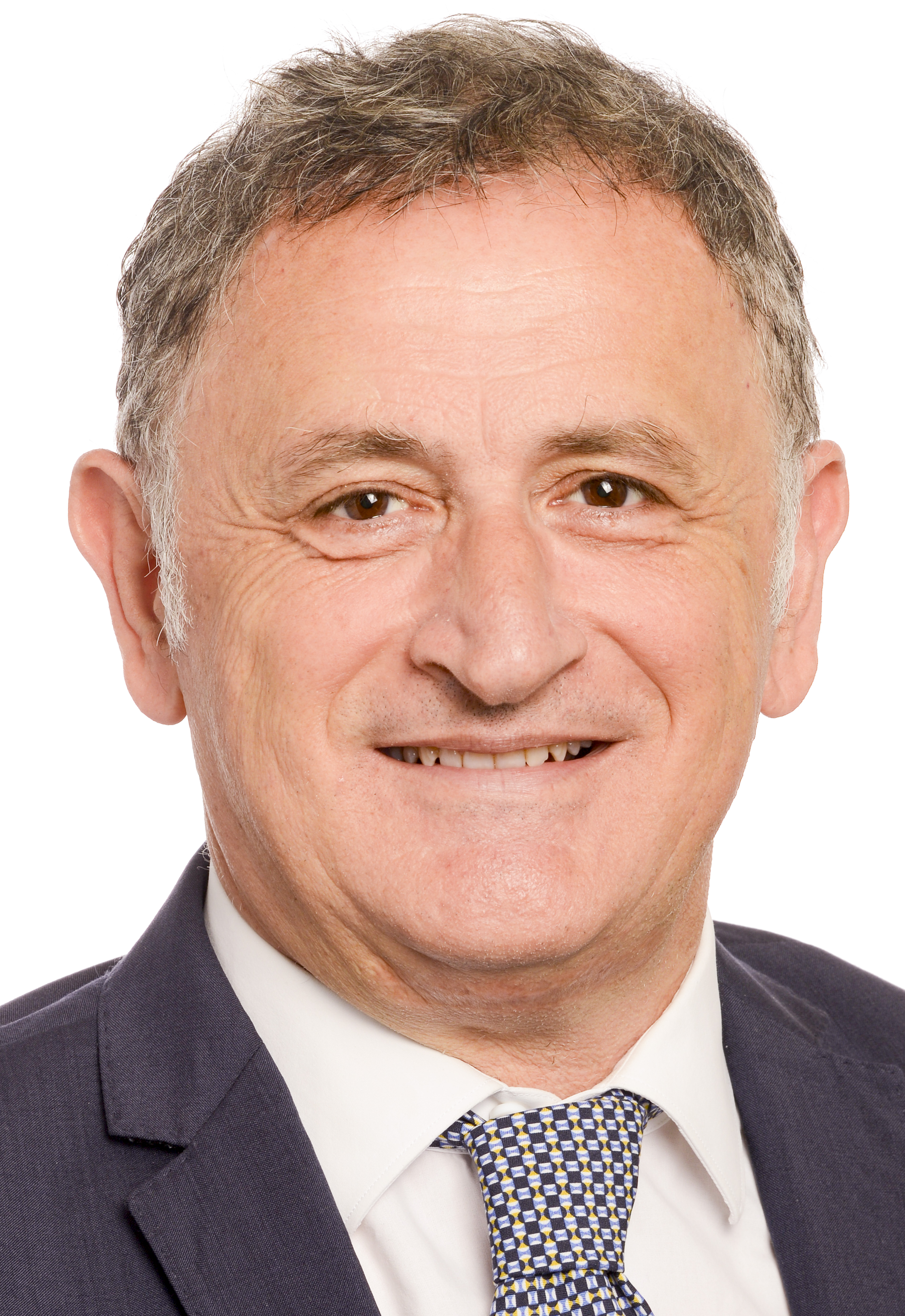

Member of the European Parliament for Southern Italy
- Incumbent
- Assumed office 17 April 2018
- Parliamentary group: S&D (until 2022); RE (since 2022)

Personal details
- Party: Italy; Action (since 2023); European Union; ALDE (since 2023)
- Other political affiliations: Italy; DC (until 1994); PPI (1994-2002); DL (2002-2007); PD (2007-2022); Independent (2022-2023); European Union; PES (2018-2022); EDP (2022-2023)
- Children: 3
- Education: University of Naples Federico II
- Profession: Engineer

Giuseppe Ferrandino (born 21 March 1963, Ischia) is an Italian politician. He became a Member of the European Parliament in April 2018 and was re-elected in the 2019 EP election. Since 2018, Ferrandino has been serving on the Committee on Economic and Monetary Affairs. In addition to his committee assignments, he is a member of the Parliament's delegation to the Euro-Latin American Parliamentary Assembly (EuroLat).
