= Silvia Costa (politician) =

Italian journalist and politician

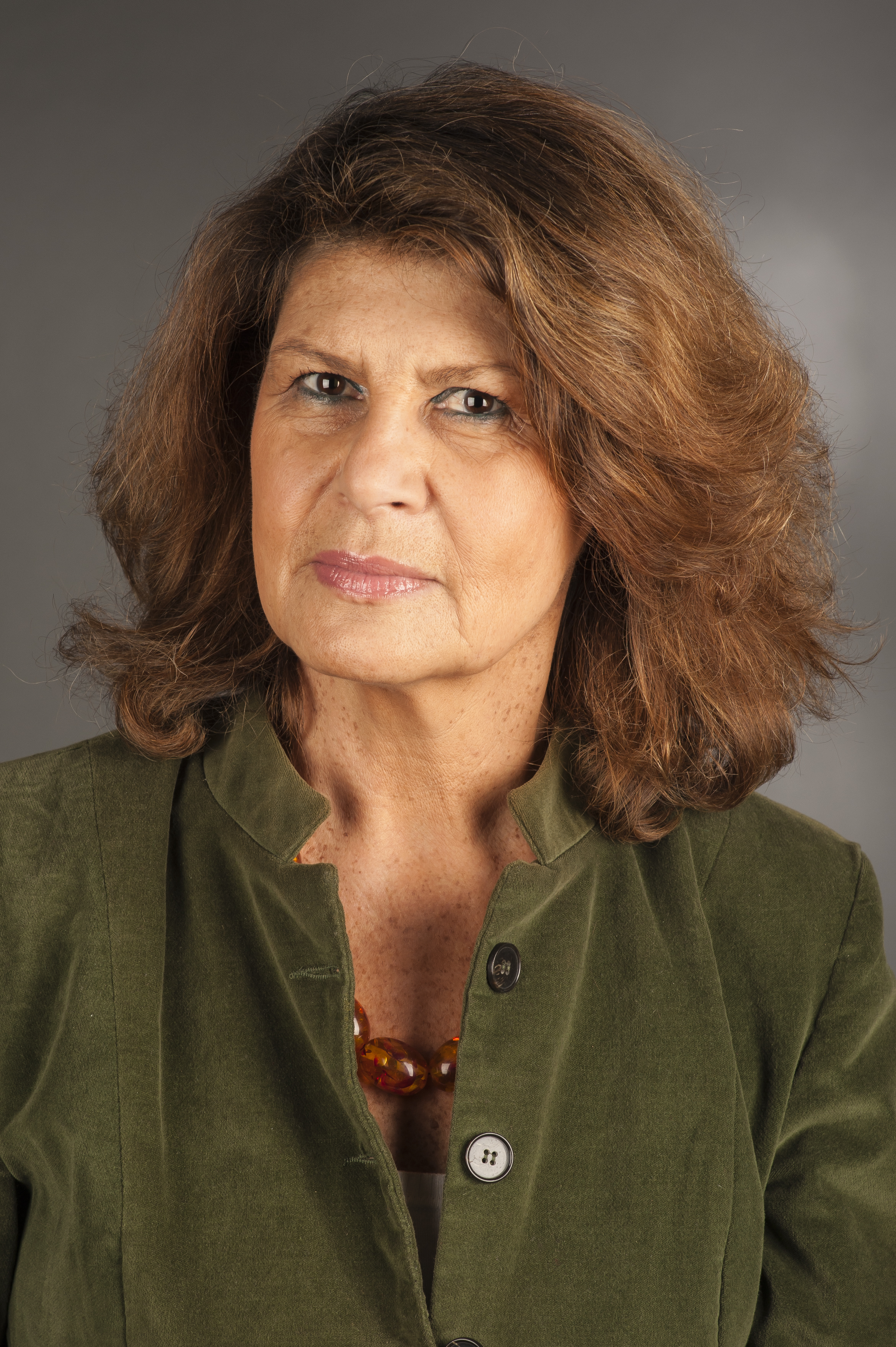

Member of the European Parliament
- In office 14 July 2009 – 2019

Member of the Chamber of Deputies
- In office 19 June 1985 – 14 April 1994

Personal details
- Born: 12 June 1949 (age 77) Florence, Italy
- Profession: journalist

Silvia Costa (born 12 June 1949) is an Italian journalist and politician who served as a Member of the European Parliament from 2009 until 2019.

== Early life and career ==
Costa was born in Florence and received a degree in modern literature from the Sapienza University of Rome. She worked as a journalist for newspapers, magazines and television (RAI). Costa was editor of the daily Il Popolo from 1978 to 1985.

== Political career ==
Costa was a councillor for the city of Rome from 1976 to 1985.

Costa sat in the Italian Chamber of Deputies as a member of the Christian Democracy party from 1983 to 1994. From 1995 to 2005, she was a member of the National Council for Economics and Labour.

Costa was elected to the European Parliament in 2009 for the Democratic Party and was reelected in 2014. During her time in parliament, she was a member of the Committee on Culture and Education and served as its chair from 2014 to 2017. She served as vice-chair of the Delegation for relations with Iraq from 2009 to 2014. She was a member of the Committee on Women's Rights and Gender Equality from 2009 to 2012.
