= Lombardy 3 (Chamber of Deputies constituency) =

- Chamber of Deputies; Electoral constituency
- Region: Lombardy
- Population: 2,375,572 (2018)
- Electorate: 1,652,489 (2022)
- Major settlements: Brescia; Bergamo
- Area: Province of Brescia; Province of Bergamo

Current constituency
- Created: 2017
- Seats: 23 (2017–2022); 14 (since 2022)

Lombardy 3 is one of the 29 constituencies (Italian: circoscrizioni) represented in the Chamber of Deputies, the lower house of the Italian parliament. The constituency originally elected 23 deputies, while since 2022, following the constitutional referendum which reduced the number of seats in parliament, it elects 14 deputies. Its boundaries correspond to those of the provinces of Bergamo and Brescia, within the Lombardy region. The electoral system uses a parallel voting system, which act as a mixed system, with 37% of seats allocated using a first-past-the-post electoral system and 61% using a proportional method, with one round of voting.

The constituency was established by the Rosato law on 3 November 2017.

== Members of the Parliament ==
=== XIX Legislature (since 2022) ===
==== Single-member districts ====
Single-member districts
Constituency			Electorate	Deputy	Coalition	Party
N.	Name	Map	Electorate	Deputy	Coalition	Party
Lombardy 3 – 01
01	Treviglio		366,945	Alessandro Sorte	Centre-right	FI
02	Bergamo		375,564	Rebecca Frassini	Centre-right	LSP
Lombardy 3 – 02
03	Lumezzane		292,426	Simona Bordonali	Centre-right	LSP
04	Brescia		338,400	Maurizio Casasco	Centre-right	FI
05	Desenzano del Garda		279,154	Giangiacomo Calovini	Centre-right	FdI

==== Multi-member districts ====
Multi-member districts
District			Party	Deputy
Name	Map	Electorate	Party	Deputy
Lombardy 3 – 01		742,509	FdI	Andrea Tremaglia
Lombardy 3 – 01		742,509	LSP	Giulio Centemero
Lombardy 3 – 01		742,509	PD	Vinicio Peluffo
Lombardy 3 – 02		909,980	FdI	Cristina Almici
Lombardy 3 – 02		909,980	FdI	Luca Sbardella
Lombardy 3 – 02		909,980	LSP	Paolo Formentini
Lombardy 3 – 02		909,980	FI	Luca Squeri
Lombardy 3 – 02		909,980	PD	Gian Antonio Girelli
Lombardy 3 – 02		909,980	A	Fabrizio Benzoni

=== Past members ===
==== 2018–2022 ====
===== Single-member districts =====
Single-member districts
Constituency			Electorate	Deputy	Coalition	Party
N.	Name	Map	Electorate	Deputy	Coalition	Party
Lombardy 3 – 01
01	Brescia		201,500	Simona Bordonali	Centre-right	LSP
02	Lumezzane		210,900	Paolo Formentini	Centre-right	LSP
03	Desenzano del Garda		197,281	Mariastella Gelmini	Centre-right	FI
04	Palazzolo sull'Oglio		189,242	Alessandro Colucci	Centre-right	NcI
Lombardy 3 – 02
05	Bergamo		228,149	Stefano Benigni	Centre-right	FI
06	Albino		234,969	Daniele Belotti	Centre-right	LSP
07	Treviglio		177,797	Cristian Invernizzi	Centre-right	LSP
08	Romano di Lombardia		196,900	Alessandro Sorte	Centre-right	FI

===== Multi-member districts =====
Multi-member districts
District			Party	Deputy
Name	Map	Electorate	Party	Deputy
Lombardy 3 – 01		798,923	LSP	Giuseppe Donina
Lombardy 3 – 01		798,923	LSP	Eva Lorenzoni
Lombardy 3 – 01		798,923	PD	Alfredo Bazoli
Lombardy 3 – 01		798,923	PD	Marina Berlinghieri
Lombardy 3 – 01		798,923	M5S	Claudio Cominardi
Lombardy 3 – 01		798,923	FI	Andrea Orsini
Lombardy 3 – 02		838,085	LSP	Giulio Centemero
Lombardy 3 – 02		838,085	LSP	Rebecca Frassini
Lombardy 3 – 02		838,085	LSP	Alberto Ribolla
Lombardy 3 – 02		838,085	PD	Maurizio Martina (Note: Resigned on 12 January 2021. Vacancy filled by Graziella Ciagà (PD).)
Lombardy 3 – 02		838,085	PD	Elena Carnevali
Lombardy 3 – 02		838,085	M5S	Guia Termini
Lombardy 3 – 02		838,085	M5S	Devis Dori
Lombardy 3 – 02		838,085	FI	Gregorio Fontana
Lombardy 3 – 02		838,085	FdI	Guido Crosetto (Note: Resigned on 13 March 2019. Vacancy filled by Lucrezia Mantovani (FdI).)

== Elections ==
=== 2018 ===
==== Overall ====
4 March 2018 Chamber of Deputies election results – Lombardy 03
Coalition	Party	Proportional			First-past-the-post			Total seats
Coalition	Party	Votes	%	Seats	Votes	%	Seats	Total seats
Centre-right coalition	League (LSP)	434,634	34.33	5	662,428	52.33	4	9
Centre-right coalition	Forza Italia (FI)	161,834	12.78	2	662,428	52.33	3	5
Centre-right coalition	Brothers of Italy (FdI)	55,076	4.35	1	662,428	52.33	0	1
Centre-right coalition	Us with Italy (NcI)	10,874	0.86	0	662,428	52.33	1	1
Centre-right coalition	Total seats			8			8	16
Centre-left coalition	Democratic Party (PD)	254,350	20.09	4	294,444	23.30	0	4
Centre-left coalition	More Europe (+E)	30,705	2.43	0	294,444	23.30	0	0
Centre-left coalition	Together	4,953	0.39	0	294,444	23.30	0	0
Centre-left coalition	Popular Civic List (CP)	4,936	0.39	0	294,444	23.30	0	0
Centre-left coalition	Total seats			4			0	4
Five Star Movement (M5S)		227,508	17.97	3	227,508	17.97	0	3
Free and Equal (LeU)		31,328	2.47	0	31,328	2.47	0	0
Others		49,694	—N/a	0	49,694	—N/a	0	0
Total								23

==== Result by district ====
Lombardy 3 – 01
01 Brescia
Candidate	Party	Coalition	Votes	%
Simona Bordonali	LSP	Centre-right	66,216	42.74
Antonio Vivenzi	PD	Centre-left	46,344	29.92
Giorgio Sorial	M5S	—N/a	29,582	19.10
Donatella Cagno	LeU	—N/a	6,327	4.08
Others			6,443	4.16
Total			154,912	100.0
02 Lumezzane
Candidate	Party	Coalition	Votes	%
Paolo Formentini	LSP	Centre-right	90,253	56.03
Marina Berlinghieri	PD	Centre-left	33,409	20.74
Michela Carnazzi	M5S	—N/a	26,893	16.70
Giada Stefana	LeU	—N/a	3,594	2.23
Others			6,929	4.30
Total			161,078	100.0
03 Desenzano del Garda
Candidate	Party	Coalition	Votes	%
Mariastella Gelmini	FI	Centre-right	77,534	51.65
Luca Castigliego	M5S	—N/a	31,958	21.29
Maria Chiara Soldini	PD	Centre-left	30,743	20.48
Simone Zuin	LeU	—N/a	3,520	2.34
Others			6,715	4.24
Total			150,110	100.0
04 Palazzolo sull'Oglio
Candidate	Party	Coalition	Votes	%
Alessandro Colucci	NcI	Centre-right	81,502	54.64
Mara Mucci	+E	Centre-left	30,475	20.43
Claudio Cominardi	M5S	—N/a	27,237	18.26
Pasquale Moffa	LeU	—N/a	3,385	2.27
Others			6,568	4.40
Total			149,167	100.0

Lombardy 3 – 02
05 Bergamo
Candidate	Party	Coalition	Votes	%
Stefano Benigni	FI	Centre-right	81,306	45.55
Elena Carnevali	PD	Centre-left	54,299	30.42
Guia Termini	M5S	—N/a	31,127	17.44
Nicola Cremaschi	LeU	—N/a	5,336	2.99
Others			6,502	3.60
Total			178,500	100.0
06 Albino
Candidate	Party	Coalition	Votes	%
Daniele Belotti	LSP	Centre-right	105,107	57.77
Marco Milesi	PD	Centre-left	40,319	22.15
Fabiola Bologna	M5S	—N/a	27,141	14.91
Massimo Cortesi	LeU	—N/a	3,096	1.70
Others				
Total			182,034	100.0
07 Treviglio
Candidate	Party	Coalition	Votes	%
Cristian Invernizzi	LSP	Centre-right	72,631	53.08
Gabriele Riva	PD	Centre-left	29,219	21.35
Vita Maria Macchitella	M5S	—N/a	27,063	19.78
Marco Caglioni	LeU	—N/a	3,041	2.22
Others				
Total			136,828	100.0
08 Romano di Lombardia
Candidate	Party	Coalition	Votes	%
Alessandro Sorte	FI	Centre-right	87,829	57.30
Ludovica Paloschi	PD	Centre-left	30,136	19.66
Andrea Dellavedova	M5S	—N/a	26,507	17.29
Colomba Plebani	LeU	—N/a	3,029	1.98
Others				
Total			153,273	100.0

=== 2022 ===
==== Overall ====
25 September 2022 Chamber of Deputies election results – Lombardy 03
Coalition	Party	Proportional			First-past-the-post			Total seats
Coalition	Party	Votes	%	Seats	Votes	%	Seats	Total seats
Centre-right coalition	Brothers of Italy (FdI)	366,787	31.45	3	657,592	56.39	1	4
Centre-right coalition	League (LSP)	190,804	16.36	2	657,592	56.39	2	4
Centre-right coalition	Forza Italia (FI)	91,576	7.85	1	657,592	56.39	2	3
Centre-right coalition	Us Moderates (NM)	8,425	0.72	0	657,592	56.39	0	0
Centre-right coalition	Total seats			6			5	11
Centre-left coalition	Democratic Party (PD)	195,963	16.80	2	272,588	23.37	0	2
Centre-left coalition	Greens and Left Alliance (AVS)	39,145	3.36	0	272,588	23.37	0	0
Centre-left coalition	More Europe (+E)	33,916	2.91	0	272,588	23.37	0	0
Centre-left coalition	Civic Commitment (IC)	3,564	0.31	0	272,588	23.37	0	0
Centre-left coalition	Total seats			2			0	2
Action–Italia Viva (A–IV)		113,000	9.69	1	113,000	9.69	0	1
Five Star Movement (M5S)		67,539	5.79	0	67,539	5.79	0	0
Others		55,470	—N/a	0	55,470	—N/a	0	0
Total								14

==== Result by district ====
Lombardy 3 – 01
01 Treviglio
Candidate	Party	Coalition	Votes	%
Alessandro Sorte	FI	Centre-right	153,202	59.71
Gabriele Giudici	PD	Centre-left	54,872	21.38
Fabio Paganini	IV	A-IV	21,257	8.28
Concetta Torrisi	M5S	—N/a	15,220	5.93
Others			12,047	4.70
Total			256,598	100.00
02 Bergamo
Candidate	Party	Coalition	Votes	%
Rebecca Frassini	LSP	Centre-right	141,420	52.97
Valentina Ceruti	PD	Centre-left	68,288	25.58
Niccolò Carretta	A	A-IV	30,606	11.46
Jacopo Gnocchi	M5S	—N/a	13,205	4.95
Others			13,582	5.09
Total			266,983	100.00

Lombardy 3 – 02
03 Lumezzane
Candidate	Party	Coalition	Votes	%
Simona Bordonali	LSP	Centre-right	125,940	61.76
Pier Luigi Mottinelli	PD	Centre-left	41,213	20.21
Massimo Ottelli	IV	A-IV	17,225	8.45
Amedeo Paccagnella	M5S	—N/a	10,273	5.04
Others			9,251	4.54
Total			203,905	100.00
04 Brescia
Candidate	Party	Coalition	Votes	%
Maurizio Casasco	FI	Centre-right	119,036	48.89
Roberto Rossini	PD	Centre-left	69,229	28.43
Guido Galperti	IV	A-IV	27,126	11.14
Samuel Sorial	M5S	—N/a	16,400	6.74
Others			11,741	4.81
Total			243,491	100.00
05 Desenzano del Garda
Candidate	Party	Coalition	Votes	%
Giangiacomo Calovini	FdI	Centre-right	117,994	60.44
Donatella Albini	AVS	Centre-left	38,986	19.97
Monica Lippa	A	A-IV	16,786	8.60
Teresa Tamborino	M5S	—N/a	12,441	6.37
Others			8,995	4.61
Total			195,212	100.00
