= Licia Ronzulli =

Italian politician (born 1975)

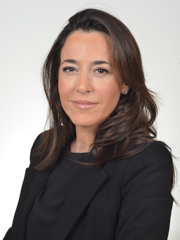

Vice-President of the Senate of the Republic
- Incumbent
- Assumed office 23 November 2023

Leader of the Forza Italia group in the Senate
- In office 18 October 2022 – 21 November 2023
- Succeeded by: Maurizio Gasparri

Member of the Senate of the Republic
- Incumbent
- Assumed office 23 March 2018
- Constituency: Cantù (2018–2022); Como (since 2022)

Member of the European Parliament
- In office 14 July 2009 – 30 June 2014
- Constituency: North-West Italy

Personal details
- Born: 14 September 1975 (age 51) Milan, Italy
- Party: FI (since 2013)
- Other political affiliations: FI (2008–2009); PdL (2009–2013)
- Spouse: Renato Cerioli (m. 2008; sep. 2012)
- Children: 1
- Occupation: Politician, nurse, health manager
- Website: liciaronzulli.com

Licia Ronzulli (born 14 September 1975) is an Italian politician. She has been a member of the Senate of the Republic since 2018 and one of its vice-presidents since November 2023, after leading the Forza Italia group in the Senate from October 2022. She was previously an MEP who represented The People of Freedom party and New Forza Italia party between 2009 and 2014. She won a seat in the 2009 European Parliament election. She was Vice Chair of the Delegation to the ACP-EU Joint Parliamentary Assembly and a member of the Employment and Social Affairs committee.

She became worldwide known because during her tenure as MEP, she took her daughter, Vittoria, to the European Parliament plenary sessions in Strasbourg.

Prior to becoming an MEP, she was a nurse in Milan.

== Biography ==
Born in Milan the daughter of a carabiniere of Apulian origins, Ronzulli began her career working as a nurse in a hospital. In 2003, she became head of the coordination of healthcare professions at the IRCCS Galeazzi orthopaedic institute in Milan. Since 2005 she has been a volunteer of the non-profit organization Progetto Sorriso Nel Mondo (Smile Project in the World), with which she travels to Bangladesh every year together with a surgical team specialized in the care of malformed children.

From April 2015 to 13 January 2017, she sat on the board of directors of Fiera Milano SpA as one of its two vice-presidents. She resigned on that date together with the chairman and four other directors, which caused the whole board to lapse.

During the 2008 Italian general election, she was a candidate for The People of Freedom party in the Marche constituency, but was not elected. In the 2009 European elections, Licia Ronzulli was elected in the northwest of Italy with 40,016 preference votes. She joined the European People's Party group, of whose bureau she was a member, and the Committee on Employment and Social Affairs. She was also a substitute member of the Committee on Women's Rights and Gender Equality, of the Subcommittee on Human Rights and of the Delegation for relations with the countries of South Asia.

In September 2009 she became vice-chair of the European Parliament's delegation to the ACP–EU Joint Parliamentary Assembly, a post she held until the end of her term. During the term she tabled, alone or together with other MEPs, more than a hundred parliamentary questions, many of them to the European Commission, including questions on combating hepatitis, tuberculosis, ovarian cancer, hypertension and Alzheimer's disease.

At the 2014 European Parliament election, she stood again for Forza Italia in the North-West Italy constituency and received more than 25,000 preference votes, but was not re-elected.

Ronzulli and her husband had attended some dinners at Berlusconi's residence in Arcore and testified at his trial in the Ruby case. Both were later investigated for alleged false testimony in the follow-up inquiry known as "Ruby ter". In November 2015 the Milan preliminary investigations judge dismissed the case against them, noting that they had left as soon as dinner was over, before the part of the evenings known as bunga bunga.

After Berlusconi's heart surgery in the summer of 2016, she accompanied him constantly and effectively replaced Mariarosaria Rossi as his personal assistant. The Italian press has described her as one of Berlusconi's most loyal aides.

In the 2018 Italian general election, Ronzulli was elected to the Senate of the Republic, representing the constituency of Cantù. From November 2018 to October 2022 she was deputy leader of the Forza Italia group in the Senate and chaired the parliamentary commission for childhood and adolescence. In March 2021 she tabled a bill to make vaccination against COVID-19 compulsory for healthcare workers, under which staff who refused would be moved to duties without direct contact with patients. After presenting it she received death threats online, which she reported to the postal police. Before May 2022 she had been in charge of the party's relations with its coalition allies, and in that month she replaced Massimiliano Salini as Forza Italia's regional coordinator in Lombardy.

She was re-elected in the 2022 general election in the Como constituency. During the negotiations on the Meloni government, Berlusconi pressed for her appointment as a minister, and the press named her as a possible Minister of Health. Giorgia Meloni refused to include her in the cabinet. Berlusconi then said that she would get no ministry and complained about vetoes, while most Forza Italia senators did not vote in the election of Ignazio La Russa as President of the Senate on 13 October 2022. On 18 October 2022 she became leader of the Forza Italia group in the Senate, a post she left on 21 November 2023. Two days later she was elected vice-president of the Senate with 102 votes, replacing Maurizio Gasparri, who succeeded her as group leader. She has been a member of COPASIR since November 2022 and of the Italian delegation to the Parliamentary Assembly of the Council of Europe since January 2023.

== Personal life ==
In June 2008 Ronzulli married Renato Cerioli, a manager and president of Confindustria Monza and Brianza; their daughter, Vittoria, was born in 2010. Two years later the couple separated. On 22 September 2010, Ronzulli took her 44-day-old daughter, Vittoria, to a plenary session of the European Parliament and voted holding her in her arms. The gesture was reported as a call for greater rights for women in reconciling work and family life, while Ronzulli described it as "maternal, not political". She continued to bring Vittoria to the voting sessions in Strasbourg, arguing that childcare at the workplace lets mothers work with fewer worries.

The French magazine Madame le Figaro placed her in 3rd place on its list of most influential women of 2010.
