= Mario Mantovani =

Italian politician (born 1950)

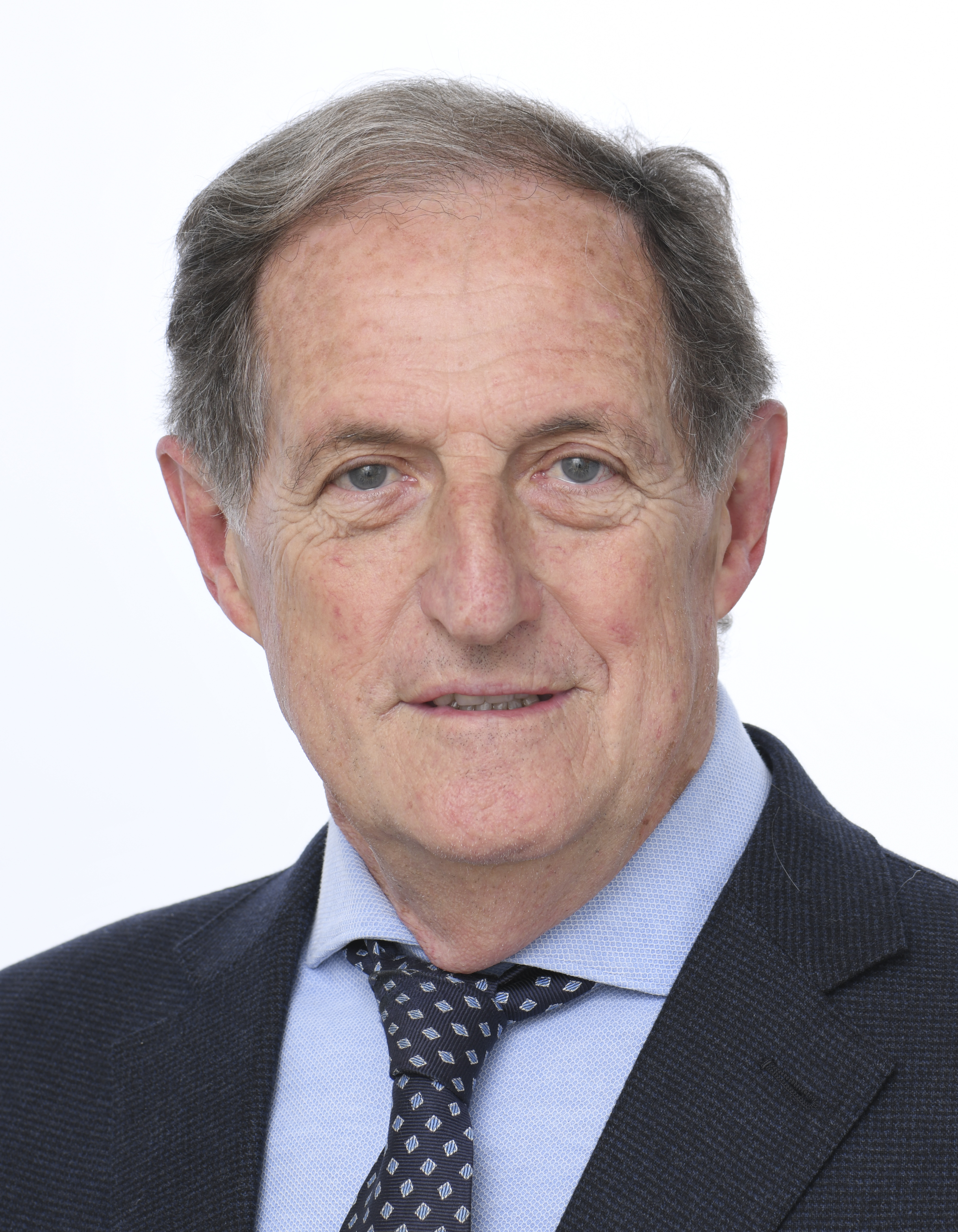
- Portrait, 2024

Member of the European Parliament
- Incumbent
- Assumed office 16 July 2024
- Constituency: North-West Italy
- In office 20 July 1999 – 28 April 2008
- Constituency: North-West Italy

Member of the Senate of the Republic
- In office 29 April 2008 – 3 June 2013
- Constituency: Lombardy

Personal details
- Born: Mario Emilio Mantovani; 28 July 1950 (age 76) Arconate, Italy
- Party: FI (1994–2009); PdL (2009–2013); FI (2013–2018); FdI (since 2018)
- Children: 2 (Vittorio and Lucrezia)
- Education: University of Milan

Mario Emilio Mantovani (born 28 July 1950) is an Italian politician who has been the mayor of Arconate and a Member of the European Parliament (MEP) since 2024. He has been a member of Brothers of Italy (FdI) since 2018, after being a member of Forza Italia (FI).

Mantovani previously held the mayorship of Arconate from 2001 to 2008 and again from 2009 until 2014 and was an MEP from 1999 to 2008. He also served as a senator for Lombardy (2008–2013), the Undersecretary for Infrastructure and Transport under Prime Minister Silvio Berlusconi (2008–2011) and Vice-President of the Lombardy Region (2013–2015).

In 2022, Mantovani was acquitted on appeal of corruption charges. In 2024, he was re-elected to a third term in the European Parliament, sixteen years after the end of his second term.

He is the father of fellow FdI politician Lucrezia Mantovani, a member of the Chamber of Deputies.

== Early life and career ==
Mantovani graduated in foreign languages and literature from the University of Milan in 1975. From 1981 to 1986, he was the director of the Padre Beccaro Institute in Milan.

In 1990, he founded the Sodalitas non-profit organization, which in Bellaria-Igea Marina has a series of residences and summer camps.

In 1996, he opened the Mantovani Foundation, specialized in the construction and management of nursing homes for the elderly. With his appointment as undersecretary in 2008, he leaves the presidency of the Mantovani Foundation, leaving the guide to his family.

Mantovani owns the Immobiliare Vigevanese company, as well as the Mantovani Foundation. With the first, he builds social welfare residences, and with the second, he manages four RSAs in the province of Milan, which, added to those led by Sodalitas, make eleven structures and 830 beds, all accredited in the Lombardy region rankings. It also manages 13 day care centres for the disabled, managed on behalf of the ASL of Milan 1.

== Political activity ==
=== Member of the European Parliament ===
In 1999, he was elected an MEP among the ranks of Forza Italia with about 39,000 preference votes and was re-elected in 2004 with about 50,000 preference votes. He sat in the European People's Party group. In 2008, he was elected to the Senate and left the seat in the European Parliament to Iva Zanicchi.

=== Mayor of Arconate ===
In 2001, he was also elected mayor of Arconate with 51% of the votes and was re-elected in 2006 with 68% of the votes. In November 2008, the municipal councilors that supported Mantovani resigned to allow him to reapply for the third consecutive time for mayor. He was reconfirmed mayor of Arconate in the municipal elections of 2009 with 66% of the votes. In May 2015, he resigned as municipal councillor.

=== Senator and Undersecretary for Infrastructure and Transport ===
In 2008, he was elected Senator and was appointed Undersecretary for Infrastructure and Transport in the Berlusconi IV Cabinet. From 29 January 2011, he became the new regional coordinator of The People of Freedom in Lombardy, succeeding the resigning Guido Podestà, president of the Province of Milan.

In the 2013 general elections, he was re-elected to the Senate of the Republic. Also elected to the Regional Council of Lombardy, he resigned as Senator due to incompatibility on 3 June 2013.

=== Vice-President and assessor in the Lombardy Region ===
Following the regional elections in Lombardy in 2013, he was elected a regional councillor on the PdL list, being the most voted among all the candidates with almost 13,000 preference votes.

He was subsequently appointed by the president, Roberto Maroni, as vice president of the Lombardy Region and Assessor for health.

On 1 September 2015, after the regional health reform with the creation of the super-department between Health and Welfare, he left the regional health department (which will be governed ad interim by President Maroni) for the delegation of regional councillor for Relations with the European Union, Community Planning and International Relations, until 13 October 2015.

In December 2016, he joined Daniela Santanchè's movement We Republicans – Sovereign People. He followed the party colleague also in January 2018, leaving his party, Forza Italia, and joining the movement led by Giorgia Meloni, Brothers of Italy.

=== Return to the European Parliament ===
In 2024, he was re-elected to the European Parliament, as part of Brothers of Italy in the European Conservatives and Reformists Group. He is vice-chair of the Committee on Legal Affairs.

In 2026, Transparency International included him in a list of MEPs who had not declared side income per the European Parliament's code of conduct. They alleged that Mantovani had three consulting roles in addition to his parliamentary post and had promised to declare the income by the end of 2024. Politico Europe noted that these had "regularly pulled in six-figure sums annually from these roles before this term began" and that he had declined to comment.

== Judicial proceedings ==
On 13 October 2015, he was arrested in Milan, accused of corruption, bid-rigging, and misdirection of public funds for school construction and patients needing dialysis transport, between 2012 and 2014, while Vice-President of Lombardy.

In 2019, he was sentenced to five years and six months for corruption, extortion and auction disruption.

Those sentences have been overturned by the Court of Appeal of Milan on 14 March 2022, which acquitted him "for not having committed the fact"; on 6 July 2022, as no appeal was received before the Court of Cassation by the general prosecutor's office, Mantovani's acquittal became final.
