= Lombardy 1 (Chamber of Deputies constituency) =

- Chamber of Deputies; Electoral constituency
- Region: Lombardy
- Population: 4,130,053 (2024)
- Electorate: 2,971,612 (2022)
- Major settlements: Milan; Monza
- Area: Metropolitan City of Milan; Province of Monza and Brianza

Current constituency
- Created: 1993
- Seats: 41 (1994–2006); 40 (2006–2022); 25 (since 2022)

Lombardy 1 is one of the 29 constituencies (Italian: circoscrizioni) represented in the Chamber of Deputies, the lower house of the Italian parliament. The constituency currently elects 40 deputies. Its boundaries correspond to those of the Metropolitan City of Milan and the Province of Monza and Brianza, within the Lombardy region. The electoral system uses a parallel voting system, which act as a mixed system, with 37% of seats allocated using a first-past-the-post electoral system and 61% using a proportional method, with one round of voting.

The constituency was first established by the Mattarella law on 4 August 1993 and later confirmed by the Calderoli law on 21 December 2005 and by the Rosato law on 3 November 2017.

== Members of the Parliament ==
=== XIX Legislature (since 2022) ===
==== Single-member districts ====
Single-member districts
Constituency			Electorate	Deputy	Coalition	Party
N.	Name	Map	Electorate	Deputy	Coalition	Party
Lombardy 1 – 01
04	Rozzano		328,184	Riccardo De Corato	Centre-right	FdI
05	Legnano		271,718	Laura Ravetto	Centre-right	LSP
07	Milan–Loreto		316,983	Bruno Tabacci	Centre-left	PD
08	Milan–Bande Nere		302,089	Cristina Rossello	Centre-right	FI
09	Milan–Buenos Aires–Venezia		329,085	Benedetto Della Vedova	Centre-left	+E
Lombardy 1 – 02
01	Monza		351,574	Paola Frassinetti	Centre-right	FdI
02	Seregno		320,686	Andrea Crippa	Centre-right	LSP
03	Cologno Monzese		364,173	Lucrezia Mantovani	Centre-right	FdI
06	Sesto San Giovanni		387,120	Marco Osnato	Centre-right	FdI

==== Multi-member districts ====
Multi-member districts
District			Party	Deputy
Name	Map	Electorate	Party	Deputy
Lombardy 1 – 01		1,548,059	FdI	Stefano Maullu
Lombardy 1 – 01		1,548,059	FdI	Lorenzo Malagola
Lombardy 1 – 01		1,548,059	LSP	Igor Giancarlo Iezzi
Lombardy 1 – 01		1,548,059	PD	Lia Quartapelle
Lombardy 1 – 01		1,548,059	PD	Gianni Cuperlo
Lombardy 1 – 01		1,548,059	AVS	Eleonora Evi
Lombardy 1 – 01		1,548,059	A	Giulia Pastorella
Lombardy 1 – 02		1,423,553	FdI	Giulio Tremonti
Lombardy 1 – 02		1,423,553	FdI	Fabio Pietrella
Lombardy 1 – 02		1,423,553	FdI	Grazia Di Maggio
Lombardy 1 – 02		1,423,553	LSP	Fabrizio Cecchetti
Lombardy 1 – 02		1,423,553	FI	Fabrizio Sala
Lombardy 1 – 02		1,423,553	PD	Silvia Roggiani
Lombardy 1 – 02		1,423,553	PD	Matteo Mauri
Lombardy 1 – 02		1,423,553	A	Enrico Costa
Lombardy 1 – 02		1,423,553	M5S	Giuseppe Conte

=== Past members ===
==== 2018–2022 ====
Single-member districts
Constituency		Electorate	Deputy	Coalition	Party
N.	Name	Electorate	Deputy	Coalition	Party
Lombardy 1 – 01
04	Seregno	238,224	Paola Frassinetti	Centre-right	FdI
05	Monza	194,103	Andrea Mandelli	Centre-right	FI
06	Gorgonzola	230,391	Valentina Aprea	Centre-right	LSP
Lombardy 1 – 02
03	Bollate	214,204	Andrea Crippa	Centre-right	LSP
07	Cinisello Balsamo	182,858	Jari Colla	Centre-right	LSP
09	Milan–Sesto San Giovanni	166,207	Guido Della Frera	Centre-right	FI
10	Cologno Monzese	205,603	Luca Squeri	Centre-right	FI
Lombardy 1 – 03
08	Milan–Area 117	168,099	Igor Giancarlo Iezzi	Centre-right	LSP
11	Milan–Area 74	163,907	Mattia Mor	Centre-left	PD
12	Milan–Area 84	173,828	Bruno Tabacci	Centre-left	CD
13	Milan–Area 105	172,903	Lia Quartapelle	Centre-left	PD
14	Milan–Area 144	181,746	Federica Zanella	Centre-right	LSP
Lombardy 1 – 04
01	Abbiategrasso	223,492	Michela Vittoria Brambilla	Centre-right	FI
02	Legnano	222,251	Massimo Garavaglia	Centre-right	LSP
15	Rozzano	225,081	Graziano Musella	Centre-right	FI

Multi-member districts
Centre-right coalition	LSP	Paolo Grimoldi; Massimiliano Capitanio; Claudia Maria Terzi; Alessandro Morelli; Fabrizio Cecchetti; Fabio Massimo Boniardi
Centre-right coalition	FI	Gloria Saccani; Valentino Valentini; Pasquale Cannatelli; Cristina Rossello
Centre-right coalition	FdI	Carlo Fidanza
Centre-left coalition	PD	Barbara Pollastrini; Gian Mario Fragomeli; Matteo Mauri; Gianfranco Librandi; Emanuele Fiano; Ivan Scalfarotto; Lisa Noja
–	M5S	Riccardo Olgiati; Stefania Mammì; Manlio Di Stefano; Paola Carinelli; Stefano Buffagni; Davide Tripiedi
–	LeU	Laura Boldrini

==== 1994–2006 ====
Coalition and parties:
Centre-right coalition (Pole of Freedoms / Pole for Freedoms / House of Freedoms)
Centre-left coalition (The Olive Tree)

Single-member districts
Constituency			Electorate (2001)	XII Legislature (1994–1996)	XIII Legislature (1996–2001)	XIV Legislature (2001–2006)
N.	Name	Map	Electorate (2001)	Deputy	Deputy	Deputy
1	Milan 1		101,269	Umberto Bossi	Silvio Berlusconi	
2	Milan 2		100,796	Luigi Negri	Ignazio La Russa	
3	Milan 3		98,768	Adriano Teso	Rocco Buttiglione	Umberto Bossi
4	Milan 4		93,978	Vittorio Dotti	Michele Saponara	
5	Milan 5		98,995	Vincenzo Ciruzzi	Mario Carlo Maurizio Valducci	
6	Milan 6		104,194	Luigi Rossi	Achille Serra	Gaetano Pecorella
7	Milan 7		100,056	Stefano Podestà	Gabriele Pagliuzzi	Pietro Armani
8	Milan 8		102,780	Roberto Bernardelli	Tiziana Maiolo	Egidio Sterpa
9	Milan 9		98,424	Roberto Ronchi	Franco Danieli	Francesco Colucci
10	Milan 10		96,917	Irene Pivetti	Gabriele Cimadoro	Rocco Buttiglione
11	Milan 11		94,869	Alberto Di Luca		
12	Rozzano		94,504	Valentina Aprea		
13	Corsico		104,248	Claudio Graticola	Giuseppe Rossetto	Fabrizio Cicchitto
14	Abbiategrasso		108,503	Franca Valenti	Giovanni Giulio Saverio Deodato	
15	Busto Garolfo		101,306	Giuseppe Rossetto	Paolo Romani	
16	Legnano		109,490	Marcello Luigi Lazzati	Giulio Savelli	Luigi Casero
17	Rho		113,286	Vittorio Giovanni Lodolo D'Oria	Francesco Monaco	Gianfranco Rotondi
18	Bollate		113,538	Elio Vito	Carlo Stelluti	Pierfrancesco Emilio Gamba Romano
19	Limbiate		100,430	Maurizio Porta	Roberto Alboni	
20	Paderno Dugnano		96,621	Carlo Usiglio	Nando Dalla Chiesa	Giancarlo Pagliarini
21	Sesto San Giovanni		92,388	Pierangelo Paleari	Giovanni Bianchi	
22	Cinisello Balsamo		97,226	Paolo Romani	Marco Fumagalli	
23	Desio		111,960	Carlo Conti	Dario Rivolta	
24	Seregno		104,857	Francesco Formenti	Alessandro Rubino	Andrea Di Teodoro
25	Monza		101,700	Raffaele Della Valle	Roberto Maria Radice	Giulio Schmidt
26	Vimercate		99,548	Ludovico Maria Gilberti	Anna Maria De Luca	Giuliano Urbani
27	Agrate Brianza		104,482	Elisabetta Castellazzi	Ercolino Duilio	Emerenzio Barbieri
28	Cologno Monzese		101,362	Corrado Peraboni	Gian Paolo Landi	
29	Melzo		103,286	Alessandro Rubino	Sergio Guido Fumagalli	Carlo Taormina
30	Pioltello		91,826	Roberto Grugnetti	Domenico Lo Jucco	Guido Possa
31	San Giuliano Milanese		95,602	Marco Taradash	Ferdinando Targetti	Fabio Stefano Minoli Rota

Multi-member district (1994–1996)
Pole of Freedoms	FI	Battistina Fumagalli Carulli; Mario Valducci
Pole of Freedoms	LN	Daniela Lauber
Pole of Freedoms	AN	Ignazio La Russa
Progressives	PDS	Franco Bassanini; Carla Stampa; Matteo Mauri; Alvaro Superchi
Progressives	PRC	Maria Carazzi
Pact for Italy	PPI	Roberto Formigoni
Pact for Italy	PS	Giulio Tremonti

Multi-member district (1996–2001)
Pole for Freedoms	FI	Lucio Colletti
Pole for Freedoms	AN	Pietro Armani
The Olive Tree	PDS	Michele Salvati; Gloria Buffo
The Olive Tree	RI	Paolo Ricciotti
PRC		Maria Carazzi; Giuliano Pisapia
LN		Roberto Maroni; Francesco Formenti; Roberto Grugnetti

Multi-member district (2001–2006)
House of Freedoms	FI	Sandro Bondi; Ivano Leccisi; Giorgio Lainati
House of Freedoms	AN	Andrea Ronchi
The Olive Tree	DS	Barbara Pollastrini; Erminio Quartiani
The Olive Tree	DL	Lino Duilio; Santino Loddo
PRC		Giuliano Pisapia

== Elections ==
=== 2022 ===
==== Overall ====
25 September 2022 Chamber of Deputies election results – Lombardy 01
Coalition	Party	Proportional			First-past-the-post			Total seats
Coalition	Party	Votes	%	Seats	Votes	%	Seats	Total seats
Centre-right coalition	Brothers of Italy (FdI)	499,938	24.95	5	867,824	43.31	4	9
Centre-right coalition	League (LSP)	199,602	9.96	2	867,824	43.31	2	4
Centre-right coalition	Forza Italia (FI)	147,193	7.35	1	867,824	43.31	1	2
Centre-right coalition	Us Moderates (NM)	21,091	1.05	0	867,824	43.31	0	0
Centre-right coalition	Total seats			8			7	15
Centre-left coalition	Democratic Party (PD)	435,579	21.74	4	623,481	31.12	1	5
Centre-left coalition	Greens and Left Alliance (AVS)	93,075	4.65	1	623,481	31.12	0	1
Centre-left coalition	More Europe (+E)	85,344	4.26	0	623,481	31.12	1	1
Centre-left coalition	Civic Commitment (IC)	9,483	0.47	0	623,481	31.12	0	0
Centre-left coalition	Total seats			5			2	7
Action–Italia Viva (A–IV)		235,629	11.76	2	235,629	11.76	0	2
Five Star Movement (M5S)		178,138	8.89	1	178,138	8.89	0	1
Others		98,467	—N/a	0	98,467	—N/a	0	0
Total								25

==== Result by district ====
Lombardy 1 – 01
04 Rozzano
Candidate	Party	Coalition	Votes	%
Riccardo De Corato	FdI	Centre-right	107,144	48.67
Ilaria Ramoni	PD	Centre-left	58,814	26.72
Stefania Mammì	M5S	—N/a	22,810	10.36
Margherita Mazzuoccolo	IV	A-IV	20,082	9.12
Others			11,273	5.12
Total			220,123	100.00
05 Legnano
Candidate	Party	Coalition	Votes	%
Laura Ravetto	LSP	Centre-right	93,142	50.90
Sara Bettinelli	PD	Centre-left	49,352	26.97
Andrea Sfondrini	IV	A-IV	16,031	8.76
Riccardo Olgiati	M5S	—N/a	15,775	8.62
Others			8,694	4.75
Total			182,994	100.00
07 Milan–Loreto
Candidate	Party	Coalition	Votes	%
Bruno Tabacci	PD	Centre-left	79,229	38.41
Andrea Mandelli	FI	Centre-right	73,038	35.41
Filippo Campiotti	IV	A-IV	23,619	11.45
Denis Nunga Lodi	M5S	—N/a	19,211	9.31
Others			11,164	5.42
Total			206,261	100.00
08 Milan–Bande Nere
Candidate	Party	Coalition	Votes	%
Cristina Rossello	FI	Centre-right	71,229	37.05
Gianfranco Librandi	+E	Centre-left	69,653	36.23
Francesco Ascioti	A	A-IV	23,098	12.02
Simona Bertogliatti	M5S	—N/a	17,893	9.31
Others			10,369	5.40
Total			192,242	100.00
09 Milan–Buenos Aires–Venezia
Candidate	Party	Coalition	Votes	%
Benedetto Della Vedova	+E	Centre-left	89,424	37.81
Giulio Tremonti	FdI	Centre-right	71,902	30.40
Giulia Pastorella	A	A-IV	54,288	22.95
Pierluigi Riccitelli	M5S	—N/a	11,960	5.06
Others			8,953	3.78
Total			236,527	100.00

Lombardy 1 – 02
01 Monza
Candidate	Party	Coalition	Votes	%
Paola Frassinetti	FdI	Centre-right	113,403	46.45
Giovanna Amodio	PD	Centre-left	71,349	29.23
Mariasole Mascia	A	A-IV	28,425	11.64
Daniela Gobbo	M5S	—N/a	19,519	8.00
Others				
Total			244,122	100.00
02 Seregno
Candidate	Party	Coalition	Votes	%
Andrea Crippa	LSP	Centre-right	117,166	54.09
Jenny Arienti	PD	Centre-left	51,442	23.75
Antonino Foti	A	A-IV	19,943	9.21
Sara Montrasio	M5S	—N/a	17,833	8.23
Others				
Total			216,630	100.00
03 Cologno Monzese
Candidate	Party	Coalition	Votes	%
Lucrezia Mantovani	FdI	Centre-right	109,324	43.83
Paolo Romano	PD	Centre-left	75,474	30.26
Livia Achilli	IV	A-IV	26,418	10.59
Elena Calogero	M5S	—N/a	25,196	10.10
Others				
Total			249,343	100.00
06 Sesto San Giovanni
Candidate	Party	Coalition	Votes	%
Marco Osnato	FdI	Centre-right	111,476	43.68
Matteo Mangili	PD	Centre-left	78,744	30.86
Daniele Tromboni	M5S	—N/a	27,941	10.95
Emanuele De Carolis	A	A-IV	23,725	9.30
Others				
Total			255,206	100.00
