= Vinicio Peluffo =

Italian politician (born 1971)

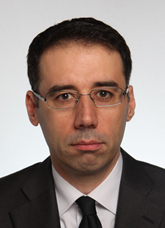
- Peluffo in 2013

Member of the Chamber of Deputies
- Incumbent
- Assumed office 13 October 2022
- Constituency: Lombardy 3
- In office 29 April 2008 – 22 March 2018
- Constituency: Lombardy 1

Personal details
- Born: 21 March 1971 (age 55)
- Party: Democratic Party

Vinicio Giuseppe Guido Peluffo (born 21 March 1971) is an Italian politician of the Democratic Party serving as a member of the Chamber of Deputies. He first served from 2008 to 2018, and returned to the chamber in 2022. He was previously president of the Youth Left from 1997 to 2001, and vice president of Young European Socialists from 1997 to 1999.

== Biography ==
Born in Rho (Milan), where he attended the “Clemente Rebora” classical high school in Mazzo (a hamlet of Rho), was elected student body president in 1989, and earned his high school diploma in 1990. He subsequently enrolled in the School of Law at the University of Milan, where he earned a degree in Law.

In his youth, he was also an American football player, during the years when the sport enjoyed a certain following in Italy as well.
