= Raffaele Baldassarre =

Raffaele Baldassarre may refer to:

- Raffaele Baldassarre (politician) (1956–2018), Italian member of the European Parliament
- Raffaele Baldassarre (actor) (1932–1995), Italian actor
