= Mariarosaria Rossi =

Italian politician

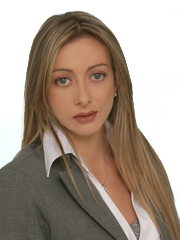
- Mariarosaria Rossi in 2013

Member of the Senate
- In office 15 March 2013 – 13 October 2022
- Constituency: Lazio

Member of the Chamber of Deputies
- In office 29 April 2008 – 14 March 2013
- Constituency: Lazio 1

Personal details
- Born: 8 March 1972 (age 54) Piedimonte Matese, Campania, Italy
- Party: FI (until 2009); PdL (2009–2013); FI (2013-2021); C! (since 2021)

Mariarosaria Rossi (born 8 March 1972 in Piedimonte Matese) is an Italian politician.

== Biography ==
She became an entrepreneur in the field of debt collection with the "Euro Service Group" of her husband at the time, Antonio Persici, with whom she has a son named Lorenzo.

Her first political experience was on the District Council in the 10th Municipality of Rome in 2006. In 2008 she was elected MP at the Chamber of Deputies, and in 2013 she was elected to the Senate.

On 20 May 2014, she replaced Sandro Bondi as Forza Italia special commissioner with the task of cutting costs and signing nominations. Within two years she was able to reduce the debt from 12 to 3.5 million euros. On 2 March 2016 she was appointed commissioner of the party in the province of Caserta.

She was given the nickname "La badante" ("The caregiver"), as she personally assisted Silvio Berlusconi in private and public matters. Together with Giovanni Toti, Francesca Pascale, Alessia Ardesi and Deborah Bergamini, Rossi formed Berlusconi's so-called "magic circle". Following Berlusconi's heart surgery, the “family council” (Berlusconi’s children along with Gianni Letta, Fedele Confalonieri and Niccolò Ghedini) replaced the “circle” which they had judged guilty of increasing the stress on the former prime minister. On June 29, 2016, Rossi resigned as party commissioner, being replaced by Alfredo Messina and at the same time she was appointed Treasurer of the Forza Italia Group in the Senate. In December she returned to Berlusconi's "court" to take care of "minor commissions and house management".

== Judicial proceedings ==
In 2010, wiretaps conducted as part of investigations by the judicial police revealed Rossi’s regular participation in the bunga bunga parties at Berlusconi’s residence in Arcore. On 24 June 2013, as part of the trial for extortion and child prostitution against Silvio Berlusconi, the minutes of Rossi's deposition were transmitted to the prosecution to assess whether or not the conditions existed for her to be investigated for perjury. On 30 June 2015, the Milan Public Prosecutor announced the end of the investigation of 34 suspects, including Rossi, accused of perjury in the "Ruby Ter" investigation into the Arcore dinners. On 19 October 2016 she was arraigned for prosecution together with 22 other people.
