= Claudio Cominardi =

Italian politician (born 1981)

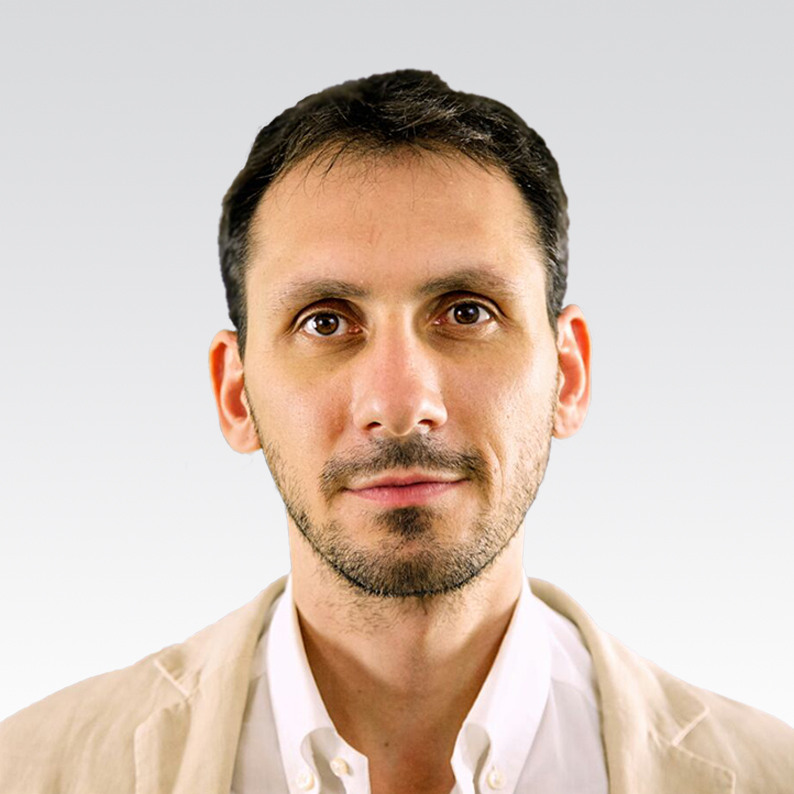

Undersecretary of State at the Ministry of Labour and Social Policies
- In office 13 June 2018 – 5 September 2019
- Prime Minister: Giuseppe Conte
- Preceded by: Franca Biondelli; Luigi Bobba; Massimo Cassano
- Succeeded by: Stanislao Di Piazza; Francesca Puglisi

Member of the Chamber of Deputies
- In office 15 March 2013 – 12 October 2022
- Parliamentary group: Five Star Movement
- Constituency: XVII: Lombardy 2 XVIII: Lombardy 3

Personal details
- Born: December 9, 1981 (age 44) Calcinate, Bergamo, Italy
- Party: Five Star Movement

Claudio Cominardi (born 9 December 1981) is an Italian politician who served as Undersecretary of State at the Ministry of Labour and Social Policies from June 2018 to September 2019 during the Conte I Cabinet. He was also a member of the Chamber of Deputies from 2013 to 2022, representing the Five Star Movement.

== Early life ==
Born in Calcinate (Bergamo), Cominardi has always resided in Palazzolo sull'Oglio (Brescia). He graduated as a business management technician with a focus on computer science and worked for over fifteen years as a technician, designer, and programmer in the mechanical and chemical-plastic sectors in small and medium-sized enterprises.

== Career ==
In 2007, he joined the Beppe Grillo Meetup group in Brescia. In 2009, he joined the Five Star Movement (M5S), which had been newly formed by Grillo and Gianroberto Casaleggio.

In the 2009 local elections in Lombardy, he ran for mayor of Palazzolo sull'Oglio on the first M5S list in the province of Bergamo, obtaining 4.14% of the votes but not being elected.

In the 2010 regional elections in Lombardy, he participated in the election campaign, supporting both the candidate for regional president Vito Crimi and the M5S candidates for the regional council.

In the 2013 general elections, he was elected to the Chamber of Deputies with the M5S. He was a member of the XI Commission for Public and Private Labour, of the Parliamentary Commission of Inquiry into the kidnapping and murder of Aldo Moro, and of the Parliamentary Intergroup for technological innovation.

He was re-elected in the 2018 general elections. Following the formation of the first Conte government between M5S and Matteo Salvini's League, on June 13, 2018, he was appointed Undersecretary of State at the Ministry of Labour and Social Policies by the Council of Ministers, a position he held until the end of the government on September 5, 2019.

In May 2022, Cominardi published on his Instagram a photo of a mural depicting then Prime Minister Mario Draghi with the body of the Capitoline Wolf, but with the breast labeled "liquid gas," held on a leash by U.S. president Joe Biden; an act that sparked discussion both within the M5S and especially among other parties.
