= Mariastella Gelmini =

Italian politician and attorney (born 1973)

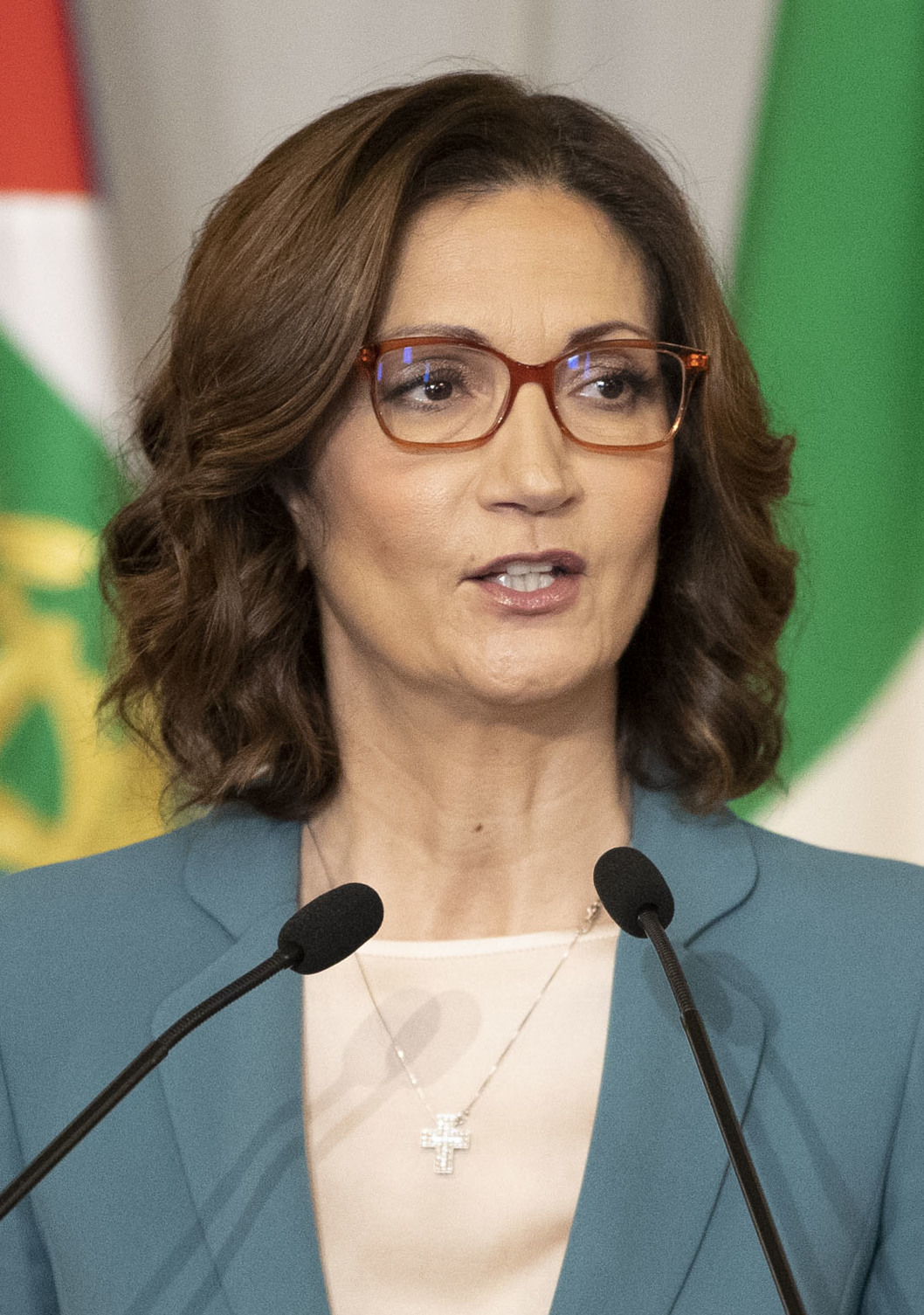

Minister of Regional Affairs and Autonomies
- In office 13 February 2021 – 22 October 2022
- Prime Minister: Mario Draghi
- Preceded by: Francesco Boccia
- Succeeded by: Roberto Calderoli

Minister of Education, University and Research
- In office 8 May 2008 – 16 November 2011
- Prime Minister: Silvio Berlusconi
- Preceded by: Giuseppe Fioroni
- Succeeded by: Francesco Profumo

Member of the Senate
- Incumbent
- Assumed office 13 October 2022
- Constituency: Lombardy

Member of the Chamber of Deputies
- In office 28 April 2006 – 13 October 2022
- Constituency: Lombardy 2 (2006–2018); Desenzano del Garda (2018–2022)

Personal details
- Born: 1 July 1973 (age 53) Leno, Brescia, Italy
- Party: Us Moderates (2024-present)
- Other political affiliations: FI (1994–2009); PdL (2009–2013); FI (2013–2022); Action (2022-2024)
- Spouse: Giorgio Patelli (since 2010)
- Children: Emma Patelli
- Education: University of Brescia
- Profession: Lawyer

Mariastella Gelmini (born 1 July 1973) is an Italian politician and attorney (specialised in administrative law). She served as Italian Minister of Education in the Berlusconi IV Cabinet until 16 November 2011. She served as minister of Regional Affairs and Autonomies in the Draghi Cabinet from 2021 to 2022.

== Career ==
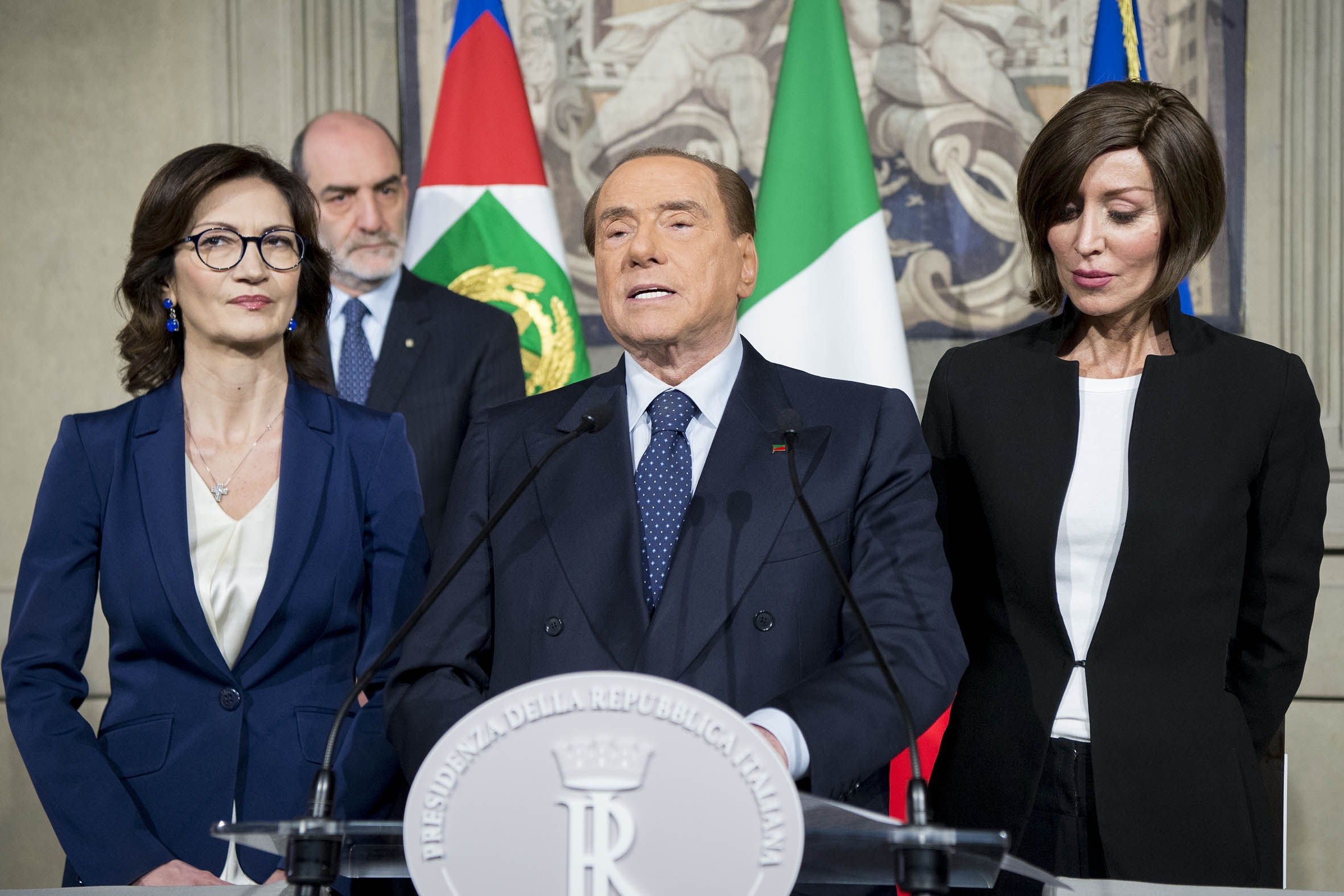
Berlusconi with FI's leaders in the Parliament, Mariastella Gelmini and Anna Maria Bernini.

Member of the Forza Italia political movement of Silvio Berlusconi since its foundation in 1994, during the same year she became chairperson of the "Azzurri" club in Desenzano del Garda settling the first representation of Forza Italia in the Province of Brescia.

In 1998, she was the first elected in the administrative poll in Desenzano del Garda and became the president of the city council until 2000, in which year a motion of no confidence against her eventually passed.

Gelmini passed her bar exam in 2001 in Reggio Calabria, far away from her home town and the university where she graduated, as the academic standards in that city were low and the pass rate suspiciously high.

In 2002, she was elected as a councillor of the Province of Brescia. During her term in office, she devised the "Piano Territoriale di Coordinamento Provinciale", by virtue of which the environmentally protected areas of Parco della rocca e del sasso di Manerba, Parco delle colline di Brescia and Parco del lago Moro were established.

In 2005, she was elected as a member of the regional council of Lombardy, resulting in the most voted candidate among the Lombard constituencies. After this electoral success, she became Forza Italia's political chief in Lombardy, becoming a coordinatore regionale.

In 2006, Mariastella Gelmini was elected as a member of the Chamber of Deputies, the lower house of the Italian Parliament.

On 18 November 2007, she was in Piazza San Babila in Milan when Silvio Berlusconi announced the birth of The People of Freedom political movement, and subsequently she became a member of the founding committee of the party. Since 2008, she has served in the Italian Government as Minister of Education in the Berlusconi IV Cabinet. In the same year, she was re-elected to the Chamber of Deputies.

On 20 July 2022, she left Forza Italia after the confidence vote for the Draghi government failed to pass and the party chose to abstain.

== Political positions ==
Gelmini supports the traditional family, arguing that same-sex marriage and adoption are "Gay Pride excesses" and that they "allow Vannacci to find an audience, just as the excesses of woke culture in the US fueled Trumpism"; while she doesn't support assisted suicide or euthanasia, she states that the decriminalization of assistance in suicide is needed.

== Critics ==
In October 2008, demonstrations took place across Italy against the school reform proposed by Gelmini. In 2009, the reform was approved. On 8 October 2010 further demonstrations by students occurred in all the major Italian cities against Gelmini's recent reforms. On 14 December 2010, when Gelmini's school budget cuts law was enacted, millions of students expressed their contempt, resulting in more than 20 million in damages to the capital, Rome.

== Controversies ==
On 23 September 2011 she attracted widespread criticism for a statement released on the Education ministry website, with regard to the breakthrough at the Gran Sasso laboratory in Abruzzo, Italy, where neutrinos were recorded at a speed greater than the speed of light. The statement wrongly declares that the Italian Government had contributed to building a tunnel between the Gran Sasso National Laboratory and CERN in Switzerland. Such a tunnel does not exist. The two locations are approximately 750 km apart. This statement caused controversy both in and outside Italy, and spawned a wave of jokes on the Internet, making fun of the announcement. Gelmini defended herself, saying that her declaration referred to the tunnel used only to send the first flux of neutrinos; Giovanni Bignami, president of "Istituto nazionale di astrofisica", defended Minister's statement.

== Electoral history ==
Election	House	Constituency	Party	Votes	Result
2006	Chamber of Deputies	Lombardy 2	FI	– (Note: Elected in a closed list proportional representation system.)	Elected
2008	Chamber of Deputies	Lombardy 2	PdL	–	Elected
2013	Chamber of Deputies	Lombardy 2	PdL	–	Elected
2018	Chamber of Deputies	Desenzano del Garda	FI	77,534	Elected
2022	Senate of the Republic	Lombardy	A-IV	–	Elected

=== First-past-the-post elections ===
2018 general election (C): Lombardy — Desenzano del Garda
Candidate	Coalition or Party	Votes	%
Mariastella Gelmini	Centre-right coalition	77,534	51.6
Luca Lorenzo Castigliego	Five Star Movement	31,958	21.3
Maria Chiara Soldini	Centre-left coalition	30,743	20.5
Simone Zuin	Free and Equal	3,520	2.3
Chiara Violini	CasaPound	1,993	1.3
Sara Prandini	The People of the Family	1,526	1.0
Annalisa Baldrati	Power to the People!	988	0.7
Others		1,848	1.3
Total		150,110	100.0

Political offices
Preceded by Giuseppe Fioroni as Minister of Education	Italian Minister of Education, University and Research; 2008–2011	Succeeded by Francesco Profumo
Preceded by Fabio Mussi as Minister of University and Research	Italian Minister of Education, University and Research; 2008–2011	Succeeded by Francesco Profumo
Preceded by Francesco Boccia	Italian Minister of Regional Affairs; 2021–present	Succeeded by Incumbent
