= Grazia Di Maggio =

Italian politician (born 1994)

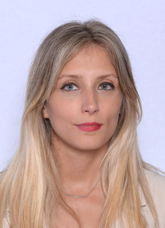
- Di Maggio in 2022

Member of the Chamber of Deputies
- Incumbent
- Assumed office 13 October 2022
- Constituency: Lombardy 1

Personal details
- Born: 11 November 1994 (age 31)
- Party: Brothers of Italy

Grazia Di Maggio (born 11 November 1994) is an Italian politician of Brothers of Italy. Since 2022, she has been a member of the Chamber of Deputies. In the 2021 Milan municipal election, she was a candidate for the City Council of Milan.
