= Cristian Invernizzi =

Italian politician (born 1977)

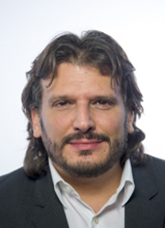
- Invernizzi in 2018

Member of the Chamber of Deputies
- In office 15 March 2013 – 12 October 2022
- Constituency: Lombardy 2 (2013–2018); Lombardy 3 (2018–2022)

Personal details
- Born: 17 June 1977 (age 48)
- Party: Lega

Cristian Invernizzi (born 17 June 1977) is an Italian politician of Lega who was a member of the Chamber of Deputies from 2013 to 2022. From 2009 to 2013, he served as assessor of Bergamo for security, local police and civil protection.
