= Carlo Stelluti =

Italian trade unionist and politician (1944–2023)

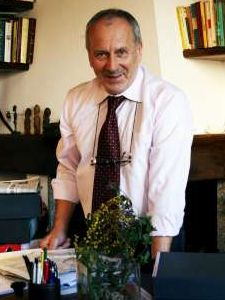
- Stelluti in 2017

Member of the Chamber of Deputies of Italy
- In office 2 May 1996 – 29 May 2001
- Constituency: Lombardy 1

Mayor of Bollate
- In office 23 April 2005 – 28 March 2010
- Preceded by: Pasquale Aversa (as Prefectural Commissioner)
- Succeeded by: Stefania Clara Lorusso

Personal details
- Born: Carlo Giuseppe Stelluti; 2 May 1944 Busto Arsizio, Italian Social Republic
- Died: 1 March 2023 (aged 78) Busto Arsizio, Italy
- Party: DS
- Education: University of Trento
- Occupation: Trade unionist

Carlo Giuseppe Stelluti (2 June 1944 – 1 March 2023) was an Italian trade unionist and politician. A member of the Democrats of the Left, he served in the Chamber of Deputies from 1996 to 2001.

Stelluti died in Busto Arsizio on 1 March 2023, at the age of 78.
