= Lucrezia Mantovani =

Italian politician (born 1984)

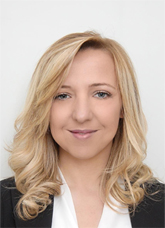
- Mantovani in 2019

Member of the Chamber of Deputies
- Incumbent
- Assumed office 15 March 2019
- Preceded by: Guido Crosetto
- Constituency: Lombardy 3 (2019–2022); Lombardy 1 (2022–present)

Personal details
- Born: 20 May 1984 (age 41) Milan, Italy
- Party: Brothers of Italy
- Parent: Mario Mantovani (father)

Lucrezia Maria Benedetta Mantovani (born 20 May 1984) is an Italian politician of Brothers of Italy (FdI) serving as a member of the Chamber of Deputies. She took office in 2019, succeeding Guido Crosetto following his resignation; she was re-elected in the 2022 general election.

She is the daughter of politician Mario Mantovani.
