= Raffaele Nevi =

Italian politician (born 1973)

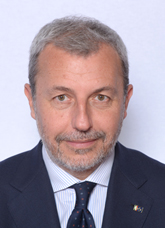
- Nevi in 2022

Member of the Chamber of Deputies
- Incumbent
- Assumed office 23 March 2018
- Constituency: Umbria – 03 (2018–2022); Umbria – 01 (2022–present)

Member of the Legislative Assembly of Umbria
- In office 20 April 2005 – 26 April 2018
- Succeeded by: Roberto Morroni

Personal details
- Born: 9 March 1973 (age 53) Narni, Province of Terni, Umbria, Italy
- Party: Forza Italia

Raffaele Nevi (born 9 March 1973) is an Italian politician serving as a member of the Chamber of Deputies since 2018. He has served as spokesperson of Forza Italia since 2023. He was a member of the Legislative Assembly of Umbria from 2005 to 2018.
