= Marco Osnato =

Italian politician (born 1972)

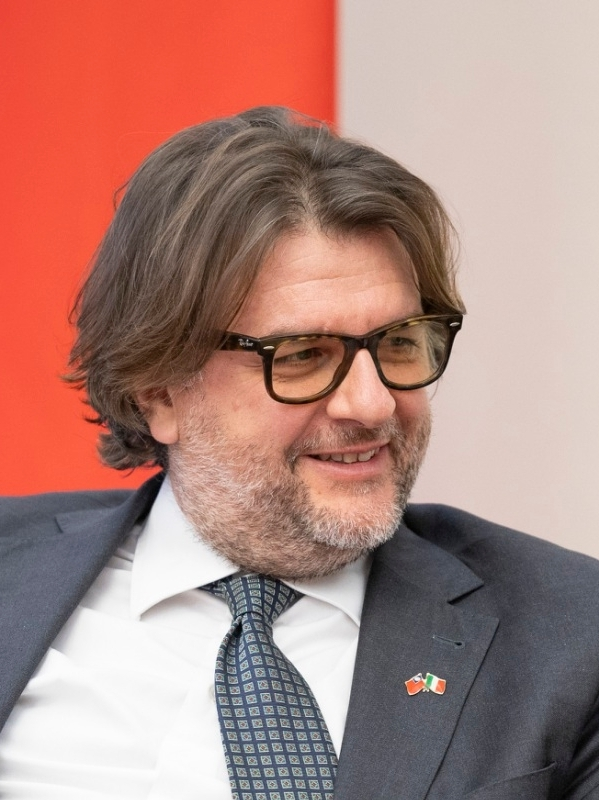
- Osnato in 2022

Member of the Chamber of Deputies
- Incumbent
- Assumed office 23 March 2018
- Constituency: Lombardy 2 (2018–2022); Lombardy 1 (2022–present)

Personal details
- Born: 20 March 1972 (age 54)
- Party: Brothers of Italy

Marco Osnato (born 20 March 1972) is an Italian politician of Brothers of Italy serving as a member of the Chamber of Deputies. He was first elected in the 2018 general election, and was re-elected in 2022. Since 2022, he has chaired the Finance Committee.

== Biography ==
Born on March 20, 1972, in Belluno, he first moved to Parma to study law at the university and then to Milan to earn a master’s degree in real estate management. He currently lives in Milan and is an entrepreneur in the construction industry.

A Juventus FC fan, he is married to Mariacristina La Russa, the daughter and granddaughter, respectively, of politicians Romano and Ignazio, and is the father of two sons: Pasquale and Romano.
