= Giangiacomo Calovini =

Italian politician

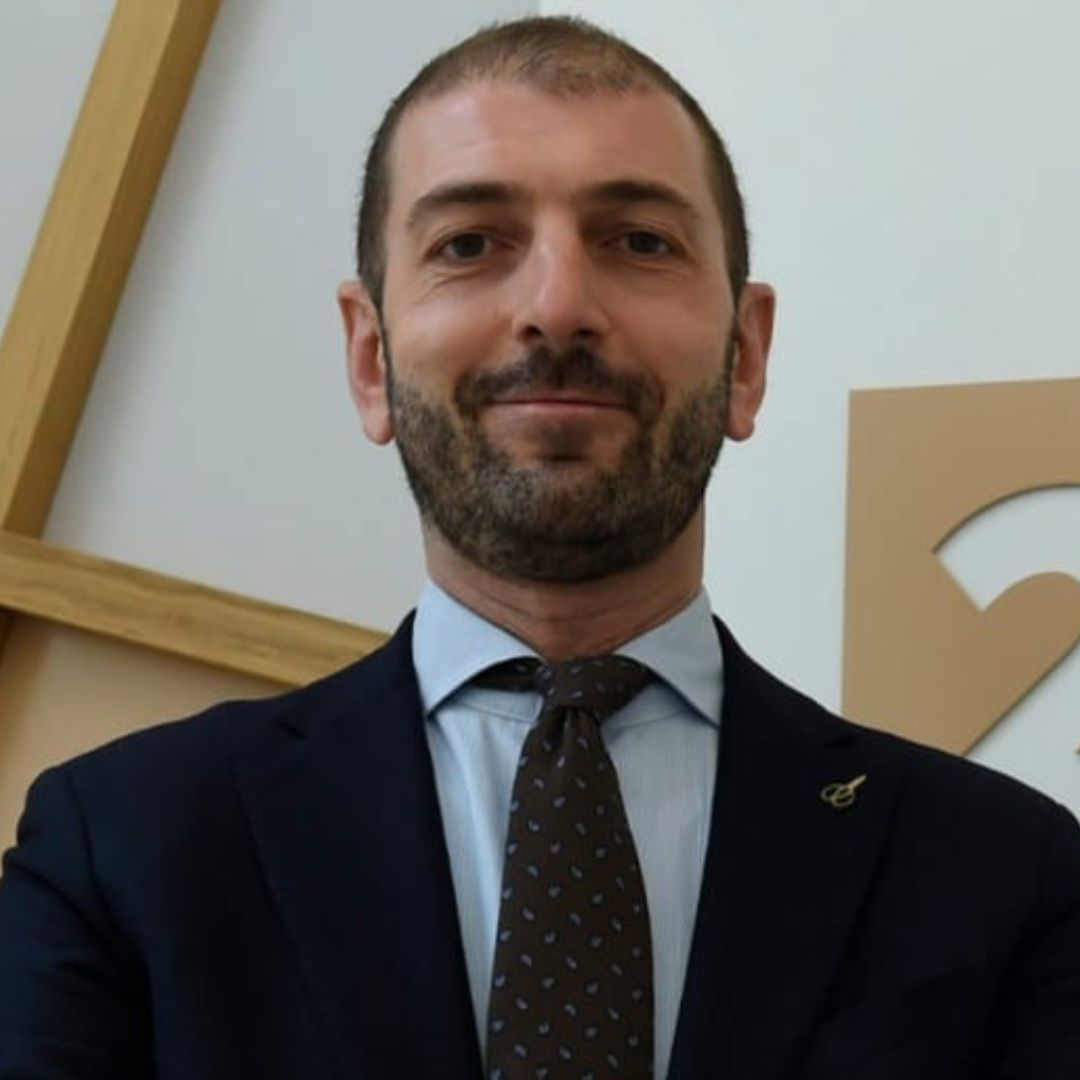

Member of the Chamber of Deputies of Italy
- Incumbent
- Assumed office 13 ottobre 2022
- Constituency: LOMBARDIA 3

Personal details
- Born: March 16, 1982 (age 44) Brescia
- Party: Brothers of Italy
- Education: University of Parma; Niccolò Cusano University; 24ORE Business School

Giangiacomo Calovini is a member of the Chamber of Deputies of Italy.

== Biography ==
Graduated in Political Science from the University of Parma with a thesis titled "Italo-German Relations from the Fall of Mussolini to the Declaration of War against Germany," he later obtained a master's degree in International Relations from "Niccolò Cusano" University, with a thesis on diplomatic relations between Italy and the Republic of China, in addition to a Master's in Political Management from 24ORE Business School, where he has been a contracted lecturer in geopolitics and international relations since 2017. After working in a family trading company, in 2016 he began his collaboration with the Lombardy region in the Department of Territory, tasked with monitoring places of worship. In 2018, he became a parliamentary assistant in the Senate of the Republic for Senator Gianpietro Maffoni. He has also worked as a consultant for international relations and public affairs.

== Political Activity ==
He began his political career in 2006 with his election as a municipal councilor in Collebeato, in the province of Brescia, on a center-right civic list. During the same years, he joined the People of Freedom party, becoming the provincial president of the youth organization Giovane Italia. He then moved to Brothers of Italy in 2012 at the time of its formation. Running with the party led by Giorgia Meloni, he candidated for the Chamber of Deputies in the 2013 general elections in the Lombardy 2 constituency, where the list did not win any seats.

In 2018, he ran unsuccessfully in both the general elections for the Chamber in the multi-member constituency Lombardy 3 - 01 and in the regional elections in Lombardy for the province of Brescia, receiving 994 votes and not being elected. That same year, he was the first non-elected candidate on the Brothers of Italy list in the municipal elections of Brescia with 152 votes, but in July 2021, he replaced Giovanni Francesco Acri.

In preparation for the 2022 general elections, he candidated for the Chamber representing the center-right coalition in the uninominal constituency Lombardy 3 - 05 (Desenzano del Garda), winning with 60.44% of the votes, tripling the result of his center-left opponent Donatella Albini (19.99%) and Monica Lippa from Azione - Italia Viva (8.60%).

He took office as a deputy on October 13, 2022, becoming a member of the III Commission for Foreign Affairs and European Community. He assumed the role of Group Leader for Brothers of Italy.

In the following months, he was appointed as a representative in the Italian parliamentary delegation to NATO and later became Vice President of the GSM - Mediterranean Special Group, aiming to raise awareness within the Atlantic Alliance on issues related to the Southern Front.

In January 2024, he was the rapporteur in the Chamber for the conversion into law of DL n. 161/2023, known as the "Mattei Plan".

== Controversies ==
In June 2022, he was investigated for corruption related to actions contrary to his official duties in connection with the resignation of municipal councilor Giovanni Francesco Acri in Brescia, which allegedly made room for Calovini, the first non-elected candidate and considered close to MEP Carlo Fidanza. In exchange, Acri's son was said to have been hired by Fidanza as his assistant. In June 2023, Fidanza and Calovini decided to reach a plea deal, emphasizing that, according to recent jurisprudence, "this choice does not imply any admission of criminal responsibility," reiterating that the contested action was the result not of corruption but of a political agreement among party colleagues, without any exchange of money or misappropriation of it.
