= Carlo Fidanza =

Italian politician (born 1976)

Carlo Fidanza MEP
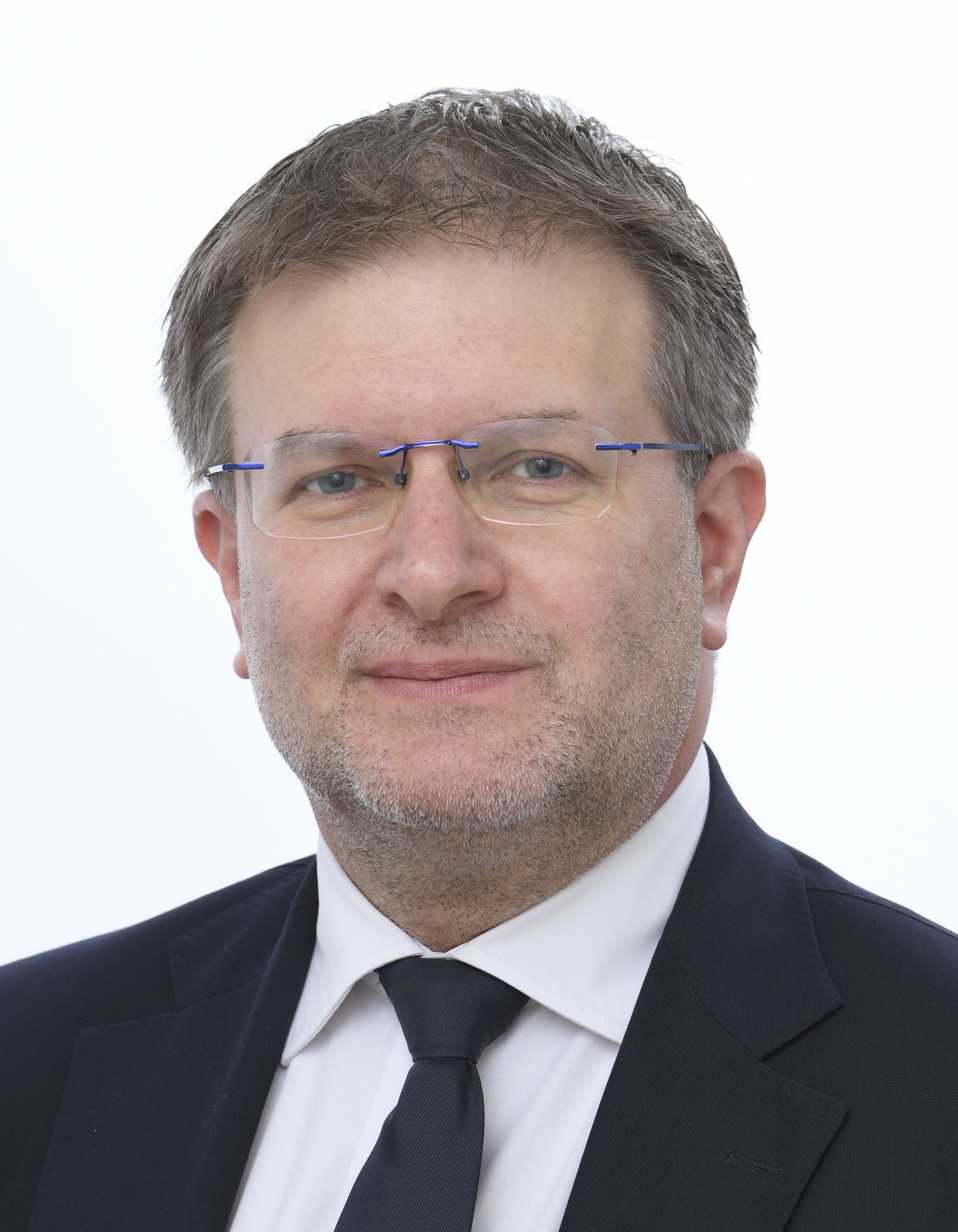

Member of the European Parliament
- Incumbent
- Assumed office 2 July 2019
- Constituency: North-West Italy
- In office 14 July 2009 – 30 June 2014
- Constituency: North-West Italy

Member of the Chamber of Deputies
- In office 27 March 2018 – 27 June 2019
- Constituency: Lombardy 1

Personal details
- Born: 21 September 1976 (age 50) San Benedetto del Tronto, Italy
- Party: Brothers of Italy (since 2012)
- Other political affiliations: Italian Social Movement (until 1995); National Alliance (1995–2009); The People of Freedom (2009–2012)

Carlo Fidanza (born 21 September 1976) is an Italian politician who has served as a Member of the European Parliament (MEP) since 2019, previously holding a seat from 2009 to 2014. He is a member of Brothers of Italy (FdI).

== Political career ==
Born in San Benedetto del Tronto on the Adriatic Sea and living in Milan, Fidanza began his political activity at a very young age in Milan in the ranks of the Youth Front, the youth organization of the Italian Social Movement (MSI). In 1995 he joined Gianfranco Fini's Fiuggi turn from the MSI to the National Alliance (AN).

He served in the ranks and held various positions of responsibility in Azione Giovani (AG), the youth movement of AN, of which he was provincial president, national leader of the youth social right.

In 2004 he became national vice president of AG (after being defeated by Giorgia Meloni in the national congress of Viterbo). In the same year he was appointed president of the Multidisciplinary Cynological Observatory (O.Ci.M.) of the Ministry of agricultural and forestry policies.

He was group leader of the Alleanza Nazionale in the Council of Zone 5 in Milan (1997–2001), as well as municipal councilor and councilor in the municipality of Desio (2005–2006).

In the 2006 local elections he was elected municipal councilor in Milan with AN under the administration of Letizia Moratti, holding the role of group leader of Alleanza Nazionale, then vice-leader of the Popolo della Libertà and president of the Council Commission "Expo 2015" until the deadline of the mandate in 2011. He was also a member of the national presidency of ANCI Giovani, the national council of young local administrators under 35.

He was also a member of the national management and regional deputy coordinator of the People of Freedom in Lombardy as well as a member of the presidency office of Giovane Italia, the youth movement of the PDL.

=== Member of the European Parliament (MEP) ===
After joining the Popolo delle Libertà (PdL) in 2009, in the European elections of 6–7 June he was a candidate, and elected, European parliamentary for the Popolo della Libertà in the north-western Italy constituency (Lombardy, Piedmont, Liguria and Valle d 'Aosta) with 26,822 personal preferences.

On 20 December 2012 he left the PDL and was one of the founders of Fratelli d'Italia, the party promoted by Giorgia Meloni, Ignazio La Russa and Guido Crosetto.

In January 2013 he was elected deputy head of delegation to the European Parliament representing the Brothers of Italy, within the PDL delegation which, for regulatory reasons, includes representatives of various center-right parties.

From November 2013 until the end of his mandate he was head of delegation of the Brothers of Italy - National Alliance to the European Parliament.

During his European mandate he was a full member of the Transport and Tourism Commission and alternate member of the Agriculture Commission.

He was a member of the EPP Group Bureau, from which the Brothers of Italy will announce the spill in March 2014.

=== Brothers of Italy ===
On the occasion of the European elections of 25 May 2014, he ran for the European Parliament in the north-western Italy constituency, reporting 12,738 personal preferences in the list of Brothers of Italy-National Alliance, not being elected because the party did not exceed the threshold of barrage nationwide 4%.

He is a member of the presidency office of the Brothers of Italy, of which he was responsible for local authorities until May 2020 when he took on the role of foreign director.

From 26 February 2016 to March 2018 he was appointed extraordinary commissioner of the regional agency for tourism promotion "In Liguria".

From January 2015 to July 2019 he was alternate member of the Committee of the Regions of the European Union, joining the ECR (European Conservatives and Reformists) Group since September 2017, in whose presidency he represented the Italian delegation.

On 4 March 2018 he was elected to the Chamber of Deputies on the list of Brothers of Italy in the multi-member college Lombardia 1 - 03 (Milan). He is a member of the Transport, Post and Telecommunications Commission.

He is a candidate for the European elections in June 2019, being elected in the north-western Italy constituency. He returns to cover the role of head of the delegation of the Brothers of Italy to the European Parliament, within the Group of European Conservatives (ECR). (Link to personal profile on the European Parliament website)

Following the election to the European Parliament, he resigns from the position of national deputy due to incompatibility; he is replaced by Maria Teresa Baldini.

Member of the Transport and Tourism Commission (TRAN) and substitute member of the Internal Market and Consumer Protection Commission (IMCO).

He was elected co-president of the Parliamentary Intergroup on Religious Freedom (FORB).

== Legal issues and investigations ==
On 30 September 2021, Fanpage.it published an investigation revealing footage recorded with a hidden camera by an infiltrated journalist, in which Fidanza, together with the Milan district councillor Roberto Jonghi Lavarini, asked the journalist, who was pretending to be an entrepreneur, to finance Chiara Valcepina's election campaign in the 2021 Milan municipal election, saying they could pay under the table and launder that money. The discussion led to jokes about Jews, black people, references to Adolf Hitler's speech during the Beer Hall Putsch, and Fidanza making the gesture of the Roman salute.

Following the publication of the article, Fidanza suspended himself from FdI. The investigation also involved Mauro Borghezio, a former MEP from the League (Lega) and the Lega regional councillor in Lombardy, Massimiliano Bastoni, and the Milan city councillor Silvia Sardone, who were filmed while proposing to make the third League with Lealtà Azione, a neo-Nazi movement, masquerading it as a non-profit organization to distribute parcels of pasta to voters with photos of the candidates on them. Giorgia Meloni, the leader of FdI, demanded to see the full footage before being able to judge. The Milan Public Prosecutor's Office opened an investigation for eight people for illegal financing and money laundering, including Fidanza e fellow MEP Angelo Ciocca, which was closed in December 2022 due to lack of evidence.

In January 2023, MEP Carlo Fidanza of Brothers of Italy was involved in a corruption investigation by the Milan Public Prosecutor's Office for having made Brescia city councillor Giovanni Acri resign in order to get Giangiacomo Calovini elected, in exchange for the appointment of Acri's son as Fidanza's assistant in the European Parliament. Giangiacomo Calovini was then elected member of the Chamber of Deputies of Italy at the 2022 Italian general election for Brothers of Italy. In June 2023 Fidanza and Calovini plea bargained with the Milan Public Prosecutor to one year and four months for corruption, avoiding the disqualification from public office that would have been triggered by the Severino Law.
