= Silvia Roggiani =

Italian politician (born 1984)

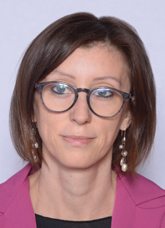
- Roggiani in 2022

Member of the Chamber of Deputies
- Incumbent
- Assumed office 13 October 2022
- Constituency: Lombardy 1

Personal details
- Born: 25 April 1984 (age 41)
- Party: Democratic Party

Silvia Roggiani (born 25 April 1984) is an Italian politician serving as a member of the Chamber of Deputies since 2022. She has served as regional secretary of the Democratic Party in Lombardy since 2023.
