= Laura Ravetto =

Italian politician

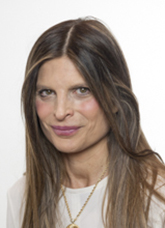
- Laura Ravetto in 2018

Member of the Chamber of Deputies
- Incumbent
- Assumed office 28 April 2006

Personal details
- Born: 25 January 1971 (age 55) Cuneo, Italy
- Party: National Future (since 2026)
- Other political affiliations: FI (until 2009); PdL (2009–2013); FI (2013–2020); Lega (2020–2026)
- Spouse: Dario Ginefra (m. 2016)
- Children: 1
- Education: Università Cattolica del Sacro Cuore
- Profession: Politician, lawyer

Laura Ravetto (born 25 January 1971) is an Italian politician. Born in Cuneo, Ravetto graduated in law at the Catholic University of Milan, and worked as a legal director in a multinational pharmaceutical company. She was first elected at the Italian parliament in 2006 with Forza Italia, and was subsequently re-elected in 2008 and 2013 with The People of Freedom. Ravetto was Undersecretary of State of the Department for Relations with Parliament between March 2010 and November 2011.

== Early life and career ==
Graduated in Law from the Catholic University of the Sacred Heart in Milan, before entering politics she worked as director of legal affairs at the Italian subsidiary of the pharmaceutical multinational Schering Plow.

== Political career ==
In the 2006 political elections, she was elected to the Chamber of Deputies, on the Forza Italia lists in the Lombardy 1 constituency. She was then re-elected in 2008 on the list of the People of Freedom. She was assigned the position of president of the Italian parliamentary delegation at the Central European Initiative.

Following the National Congress of 27–29 March 2009 in Rome, she was appointed National Head of the Communication, image, and propaganda sector of the People of Freedom. On 23 April 2009 in Rome, the President of the Chamber Gianfranco Fini, on the occasion of the meeting with the President of the Romanian Chamber of Deputies, Roberta Anastase, appointed her President of the Italy-Romania friendship group.

She was nominated for the 2009 European Parliament election in the north-western Italy constituency in the PdL list, obtaining 7,715 preferences, not enough to be elected. On 1 March 2010 she was appointed Undersecretary of State for relations with the Parliament of the Berlusconi IV government and remained in office until 16 November 2011.

In the 2013 parliamentary election, she was re-elected deputy for the PdL in the Lombardy 2 constituency. In the 2018 election she has been re-elected to the Chamber in the uninominal constituency of Como. On 6 October 2019 she has been appointed head of the immigration department of Forza Italia. On 19 November 2020, she abandoned Forza Italia to join the League.

== Personal life ==
Since 4 June 2016, Ravetto has been married to the former deputy of the Democratic Party (PD) Dario Ginefra. Walter Veltroni united them in marriage. In January 2018, at the age of 47, she became the mother of a girl, Clarissa Delfina.
