= Simona Bordonali =

Italian politician (born 1971)

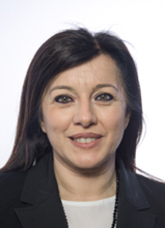
- Bordonali in 2018

Member of the Chamber of Deputies
- Incumbent
- Assumed office 23 March 2018
- Constituency: Lombardy 3 – 01 (2018–2022); Lombardy 3 – 03 (2022–present)

Personal details
- Born: 1 August 1971 (age 54)
- Party: Lega

Simona Bordonali (born 1 August 1971) is an Italian politician serving as a member of the Chamber of Deputies since 2018. From 2013 to 2018, she served as assessor for security, civil protection and immigration of Lombardy.
