= Alessandro Sorte =

Italian politician (born 1984)

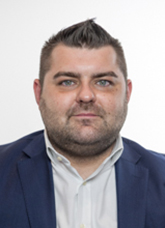
- Sorte in 2018

Member of the Chamber of Deputies
- Incumbent
- Assumed office 23 March 2018
- Constituency: Lombardy 3 – 08 (2018–2022); Lombardy 3 – 01 (2022–present)

Personal details
- Born: 19 February 1984 (age 42)
- Party: Forza Italia

Alessandro Sorte (born 19 February 1984) is an Italian politician serving as a member of the Chamber of Deputies since 2018. From 2014 to 2018, he served as assessor for infrastructure and mobility of Lombardy.
