= Deborah Bergamini =

Italian politician, manager and journalist

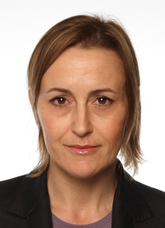

Member of the Chamber of Deputies
- Incumbent
- Assumed office 29 April 2008
- Constituency: Tuscany

Personal details
- Born: 24 October 1967 (age 58) Viareggio, Italy
- Party: Forza Italia
- Education: University of Florence
- Profession: Journalist; Politician

Deborah Bergamini (born 24 October 1967) is an Italian politician, manager and journalist currently member of the Italian Parliament.

== Education ==
Bergamini studied literature and philosophy and went on to study at Smith College in Northampton, Massachusetts, specialising in political marketing.

== Media career ==
Bergamini embarked on a career as a journalist, starting working for local newspapers and TVs in Tuscany. In 1996, she moved to Paris to work for the French publisher "Analyses et Synthèses" and then from 1997 to 1999 she was based in London, working for Bloomberg. It was while at Bloomberg that she interviewed Silvio Berlusconi, who subsequently recruited her as his communication advisor.

Between 2002 and January 2008 Bergamini worked for RAI television, first as deputy and then as director for strategic marketing.

== Political career ==
Bergamini entered the Italian Chamber of Deputies in 2008 as a member of The People of Freedom political movement and since then she is member of the Committee on Transports, Postal Services and Communication. In November 2011 she was also elected vice-president of the inquiry commission on piracy and counterfeiting.

In addition to her role in parliament, Bergamini has been serving as member of the Italian delegation to the Parliamentary Assembly of the Council of Europe since 2008. She is member of the Committee on culture and Chair of the Sub-Committee on Media and Information Society. In this capacity, she has been the Assembly’s rapporteur on the governance of artificial intelligence since 2019. She is also President, since 17 March 2009, of the North-South Centre of the Council of Europe.
