= Niccolò Ghedini =

Italian lawyer and politician (1959–2022)

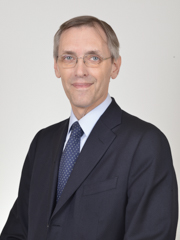

Member of the Senate
- In office 27 April 2006 – 29 April 2008
- In office 14 March 2013 – 17 August 2022

Member of the Chamber of Deputies
- In office 30 May 2001 – 27 April 2006
- In office 29 April 2008 – 14 March 2013

Personal details
- Born: 22 December 1959 Padua, Italy
- Died: 17 August 2022 (aged 62) Milan, Italy
- Party: Forza Italia (2013–2022)
- Other political affiliations: PLI (until 1994); Forza Italia (1994–2009); PdL (2009–2013)
- Education: University of Ferrara
- Occupation: Lawyer

Niccolò Ghedini (22 December 1959 – 17 August 2022) was an Italian lawyer and politician who was the lawyer of the former prime minister, Silvio Berlusconi.

Ghedini was born in Padua on 22 December 1959. A member of the Italian Liberal Party from the late 1970s, he later joined Forza Italia following his long-time friend Giancarlo Galan. He was elected for the first time to the Chamber of Deputies in 2001.

From 2005, he was the regional coordinator of Forza Italia in Veneto.

Ghedini died of leukemia, in Milan, on 17 August 2022, at the age of 62.
