= Rebecca Frassini =

Italian politician (born 1988)

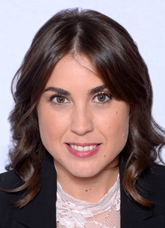
- Frassini in 2022

Member of the Chamber of Deputies
- Incumbent
- Assumed office 23 March 2018
- Constituency: Lombardy 3 – 02 (2018–2022); Lombardy 3 – 02 (2022–present)

Personal details
- Born: 24 November 1988 (age 37)
- Party: Lega

Rebecca Frassini (born 24 November 1988) is an Italian politician serving as a member of the Chamber of Deputies since 2018. From 2016 to 2021, she was a municipal councillor of San Paolo d'Argon.
