= Maurizio Casasco =

Italian politician

Member of the Chamber of Deputies of Italy
- Constituency: LOMBARDIA 3

Personal details
- Born: September 7, 1954 (age 71)
- Party: Nato A

Maurizio Casasco is a member of the Chamber of Deputies of Italy.
