= Andrea Tremaglia =

Italian politician (born 1987)

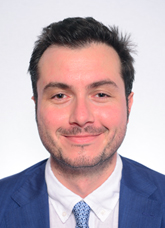

Member of the Chamber of Deputies
- Incumbent
- Assumed office October 13, 2022
- Parliamentary group: FdI

Personal details
- Born: September 25, 1987 (age 38) Bergamo, Italy
- Party: FdI (since 2012); PdL (2010–2012)
- Education: Università Cattolica del Sacro Cuore
- Occupation: Politician

Andrea Tremaglia (born September 25, 1987) is an Italian politician, deputy in the Chamber of Deputies for Brothers of Italy (Fdl).

== Biography ==
Andrea Tremaglia was born on September 25, 1987, in Bergamo, Italy. His father Marzio Tremaglia, Lombardy Regional Councillor for Culture who died of cancer in 2000 at the age of 42. His grandfather Mirko Tremaglia, a historic Missino leader and Minister for Italians Worldwide in the Berlusconi II and III governments. He graduated from the Paolo Sarpi classical high school in Bergamo and continued his university studies until he obtained a law degree from the Catholic University of the Sacred Heart in Milan. He collaborates with several local online newspapers.

== Political career ==
For the 2010 Lombard regional election, Tremaglia was among the lists of The People of Freedom (PdL) in support of the outgoing president Roberto Formigoni. In December 2012, he took part in the PdL split led by Giorgia Meloni, Ignazio La Russa, and Guido Crosetto, and contributed to the creation of Brothers of Italy (FdI), of which he was first a delegate and then national leader.

In the 2014 Italian local elections, Tremaglia ran for Bergamo city council among the lists of FdI in support of centre-right coalition mayor Franco Tentorio, being elected city councillor. At the 2019 Italian local elections, he was re-elected as a candidate on the FdI lists in support of centre-right coalition mayoral candidate Giacomo Stucchi, and re-elected Bergamo city councilor. In the 2022 Italian general election he was a candidate for the Chamber of Deputies among the lists of FdI as a leading candidate in the multi-member district of Lombardy 3 – 01, being elected deputy. In the Legislature XIX of Italy, he is a member of the 5th Committee on Budget, Treasury and Planning.

== See also ==
- List of members of the Italian Chamber of Deputies, 2022
