= Paolo Formentini =

Italian politician (born 1980)

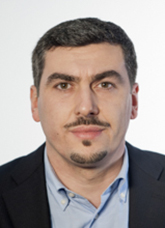
- Formentini in 2018

Member of the Chamber of Deputies
- Incumbent
- Assumed office 23 March 2018
- Constituency: Lombardy 3 – U02 (2018–2022); Lombardy 3 – P02 (2022–present)

Personal details
- Born: 30 April 1980 (age 46)
- Party: Lega

Paolo Formentini (born 30 April 1980) is an Italian politician serving as a member of the Chamber of Deputies since 2018. He has been a member of the NATO Parliamentary Assembly since 2018.
