= Raffaele Baldassarre (politician) =

Italian politician (1956–2018)

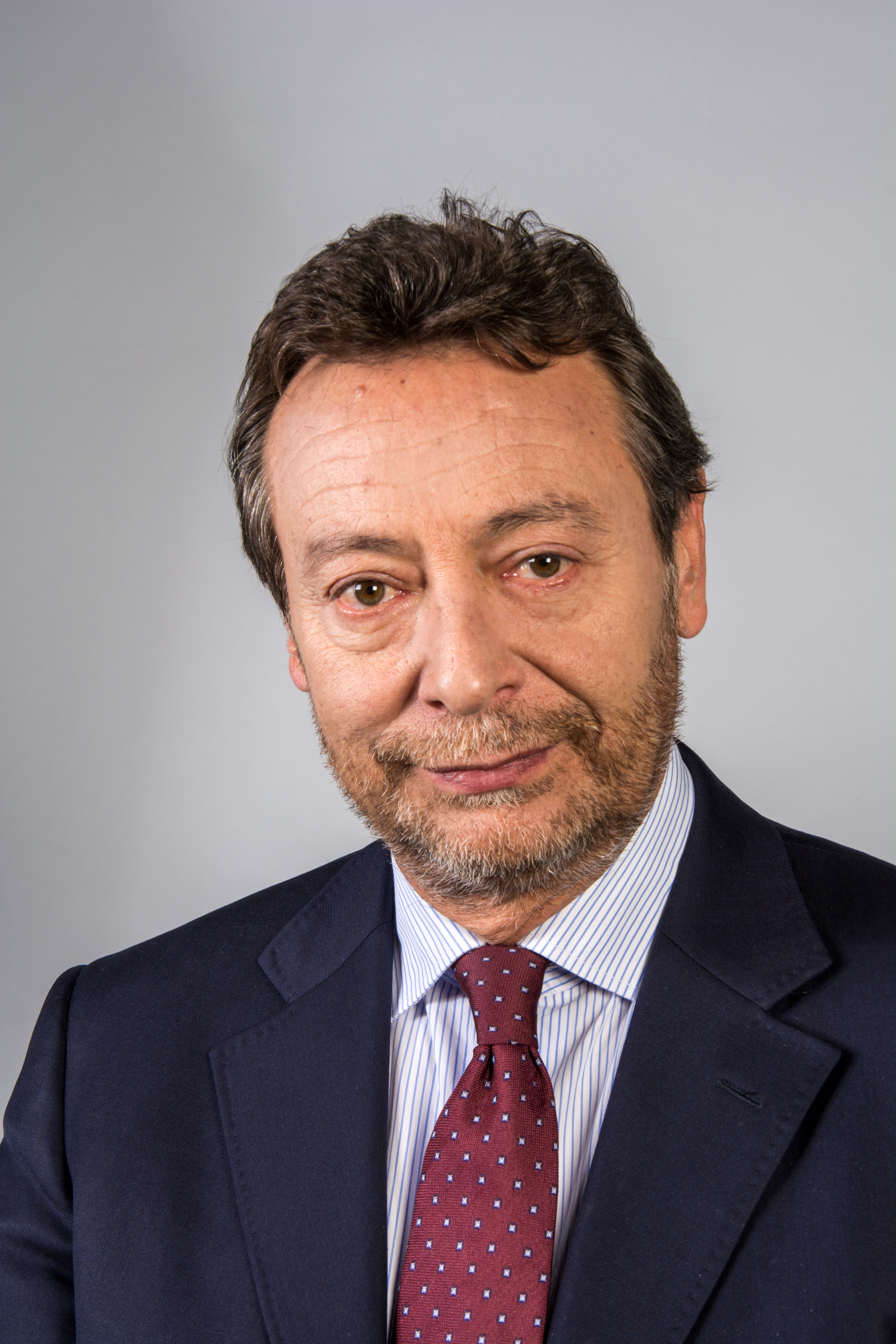
Raffaele Baldassarre (MEP) 2014

Raffaele Baldassarre (23 September 1956 – 10 November 2018) was an Italian politician and a member of the European Parliament from 2009 to 2014 for the European People's Party. He was born in Lecce and died in a hospital there after a sudden illness had its onset at his home the night prior.

== Controversies ==
In 2013, Baldassarre was videotaped by Dutch newsblog Geenstijl, checking in at the European Parliament to claim 304 euro daily expenses fee and immediately leaving. When confronted, Baldassare attacked the reporter.
