= Stefano Benigni =

Italian politician

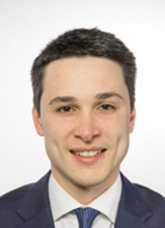

Member of the Chamber of Deputies of Italy
- Incumbent
- Assumed office 2018
- Constituency: Lombardy 3

Personal details
- Born: July 16, 1987 (age 38) Alzano Lombardo

Stefano Benigni is a member of the Chamber of Deputies of Italy.
