= Forza Italia (2013) =

Italian political party

- Abbreviation: FI
- Secretary: Antonio Tajani
- Founder: Silvio Berlusconi
- Founded: 16 November 2013; 12 years ago
- Preceded by: The People of Freedom
- Headquarters: Piazza San Lorenzo in Lucina 4, Rome
- Newspaper: Il Mattinale
- Student wing: Studenti per le Libertà
- Youth wing: Forza Italia Giovani
- Women's wing: Azzurro Donna
- Membership (2025): 250,000
- Ideology: Liberal conservatism; Christian democracy; Populism
- Political position: Centre-right
- National affiliation: Centre-right coalition
- European affiliation: European People's Party
- European Parliament group: European People's Party Group
- International affiliation: International Democracy Union
- Colours: Azure
- Chamber of Deputies: 52 / 400
- Senate: 19 / 205
- European Parliament: 8 / 76
- Regional Councils: 102 / 896
- Conference of Regions: 5 / 21

Website
- forzaitalia.it

Forza Italia (Note: The name is not usually translated into English: forza is the second-person singular imperative of forzare, in this case translating to 'compel' or 'press', and so means something like "Forward, Italy", "Come on, Italy" or "Go, Italy!". Forza Italia! was used as a sport slogan, and was also the slogan of Christian Democracy in the 1987 Italian general election. Giovanni Baccarin, Che fine ha fatto la DC?, Gregoriana, Padova 2000). See also Forza Italia.) (English: Forward Italy, FI) is a centre-right political party in Italy, whose ideology includes elements of liberal conservatism, Christian democracy, liberalism and populism. FI is a member of the European People's Party. Silvio Berlusconi (former Prime Minister of Italy, 1994–1995, 2001–2006, and 2008–2011) was the party's leader and president until his death in 2023. The party has since been led by Antonio Tajani (former President of the European Parliament, 2017–2019), who had been vice president and coordinator and now functions as secretary. Other leading members include Elisabetta Casellati (former President of the Senate, 2018–2022).

The party branched out of the People of Freedom (PdL) in 2013, and is a revival of the original Forza Italia (FI), founded in 1994 and disbanded in 2009, when it was merged with National Alliance (AN) and several minor parties to form the PdL. FI is a smaller party than the early PdL, which suffered three significant splits: Future and Freedom in 2010, Brothers of Italy in 2012, and the New Centre-Right in 2013. In the 2018 general election FI was overtaken by the League as the largest party of the centre-right coalition, and in the 2022 general election it became the third largest in the coalition, as Brothers of Italy (FdI) became the new dominant party of the coalition.

After participating in the national unity government led by Mario Draghi, FI joined the government majority of the Meloni Cabinet in October 2022 with five ministers; these ministers include Tajani as deputy prime minister and foreign affairs minister.

== History ==
=== Background and foundation ===
The new FI, announced in June 2013, was launched on 18 September and the PdL was formally dissolved into the party on 16 November. The day before a group of dissidents (mainly Christian democrats), led by Berlusconi's former protégé Angelino Alfano, had broken away by announcing the foundation of the alternative New Centre-Right (NCD). Another group of PdL members, led by former mayor of Rome Gianni Alemanno, had left the party earlier to form Italy First and would later join Brothers of Italy (FdI). According to Berlusconi, the PdL would become a coalition of centre-right parties, including the new FI, Lega Nord (LN), the NCD, the FdI, etc.

Among the supporters of the return to FI, the so-called "hawks" and self-proclaimed "loyalists", a leading role was played by Raffaele Fitto, who, despite the common Christian-democratic background, was a long-time rival of Alfano. Loyalists included Antonio Martino, Renato Brunetta, Denis Verdini, Mariastella Gelmini, Mara Carfagna, Daniela Santanchè, Niccolò Ghedini and Daniele Capezzone, while Maurizio Gasparri, Altero Matteoli and Paolo Romani tried to mediate, but finally joined the new FI. The symbol of FI made its return in the 2013 Trentino-Alto Adige/Südtirol provincial elections, although in a regional fashion such as "Forza Trentino", or "Forza Alto Adige" (in list with Lega Nord Alto Adige – Südtirol).

On 27 November, the Senate approved Berlusconi's expulsion, following the leader's conviction for tax evasion in August, when Berlusconi was sentenced to four years of imprisonment, the last three being automatically pardoned. The day before FI had joined the opposition to Enrico Letta's government, which was still supported by Alfano's NCD instead. The latter voted against Berlusconi's expulsion, but since then completely parted ways from FI.

=== Internal struggles and Toti's rise ===
As of the end of December 2013, Berlusconi was set to appoint two vice presidents: Antonio Tajani (European Commissioner and vice president of the European People's Party) and Giovanni Toti (former editor of Studio Aperto and TG4, two news programs of Berlusconi's Mediaset). As a result of the resentment by the party's old guard, notably including Fitto, on the alleged appointment of Toti also as coordinator-at-large, Berlusconi appointed him merely "political counselor" to the party.

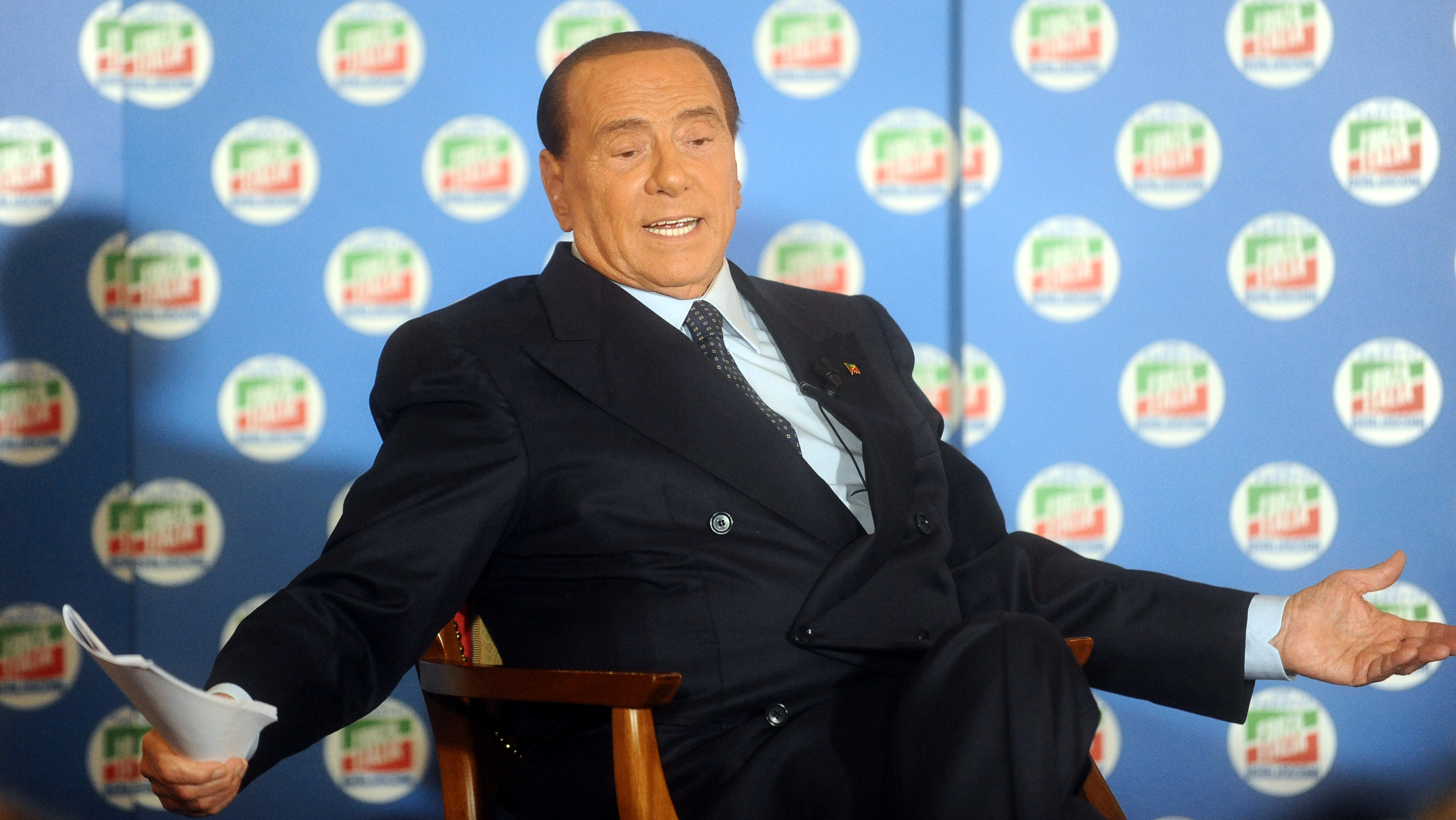
Silvio Berlusconi in 2018

In the 2014 European Parliament election, FI obtained 16.8% of the vote and had 13 MEPs elected, including Toti in the North-West, Elisabetta Gardini in the North-East, Tajani (who had first been elected to the European Parliament in 1994) in the Centre, and most notably Fitto (who garnered more than 180,000 votes in his native Apulia alone) in the South. As a result, Fitto, the strongest backer of Berlusconi's leadership in late 2013, became his main internal challenger by mid 2014. After months of bickering with Berlusconi over the "Nazareno Pact" with Matteo Renzi, leader of the Democratic Party and Prime Minister, in February 2015, Fitto launched his own faction, named "Rebuilders". Fitto's supporters included Capezzone, Maurizio Bianconi, Rocco Palese, Saverio Romano, Cinzia Bonfrisco, Augusto Minzolini and most Apulian MPs. In September 2014, FI was admitted into the European People's Party (EPP), inheriting the PdL's membership.

=== 2015 regional elections and splits ===
In the run-up of the 2015 regional elections, the party was riven in internal disputes and was divided mainly in three groups: Berlusconi's loyalists, Fitto's "Rebuilders" and nostalgics of the "Nazareno Pact". The latter were led by Verdini and some of them, notably including Bondi, were openly pro-Renzi. Bondi, a former Berlusconi loyalist, and his partner Manuela Repetti left the party in March, while other disgruntled Verdiniani propped up the government from time to time. Berlusconi chose Toti as candidate for president in Liguria, confirmed incumbent Stefano Caldoro as the party's standard-bearer in Campania and renewed their support of LN's Luca Zaia in Veneto. However, Berlusconi and Fitto did not find an agreement on the composition of the slates in Apulia, where the two wings of the party fielded opposing candidates for president, and similar problems arose in Tuscany, Verdini's (and Renzi's) home region and stronghold.

Two weeks before the elections, Fitto left FI and the European People's Party group in the European Parliament to join the European Conservatives and Reformists and start his own party, the Conservatives and Reformists (CR). By mid July, when CR was formally established as a party, nine deputies, ten senators and another MEP had left FI to follow Fitto. In the elections, the party lost many votes, mainly to the LN, and gained more than 10% only in three regions out seven (including Apulia, where the party's candidate did worse than Fitto's one, while, in Veneto, a former stronghold, FI barely reached 6%), but, thanks to the LN's strong showing, Toti was elected President of Liguria. Another split occurred in late July, when Verdini led his group out of the party and launched the Liberal Popular Alliance (ALA).

=== Toward a new centre-right coalition ===
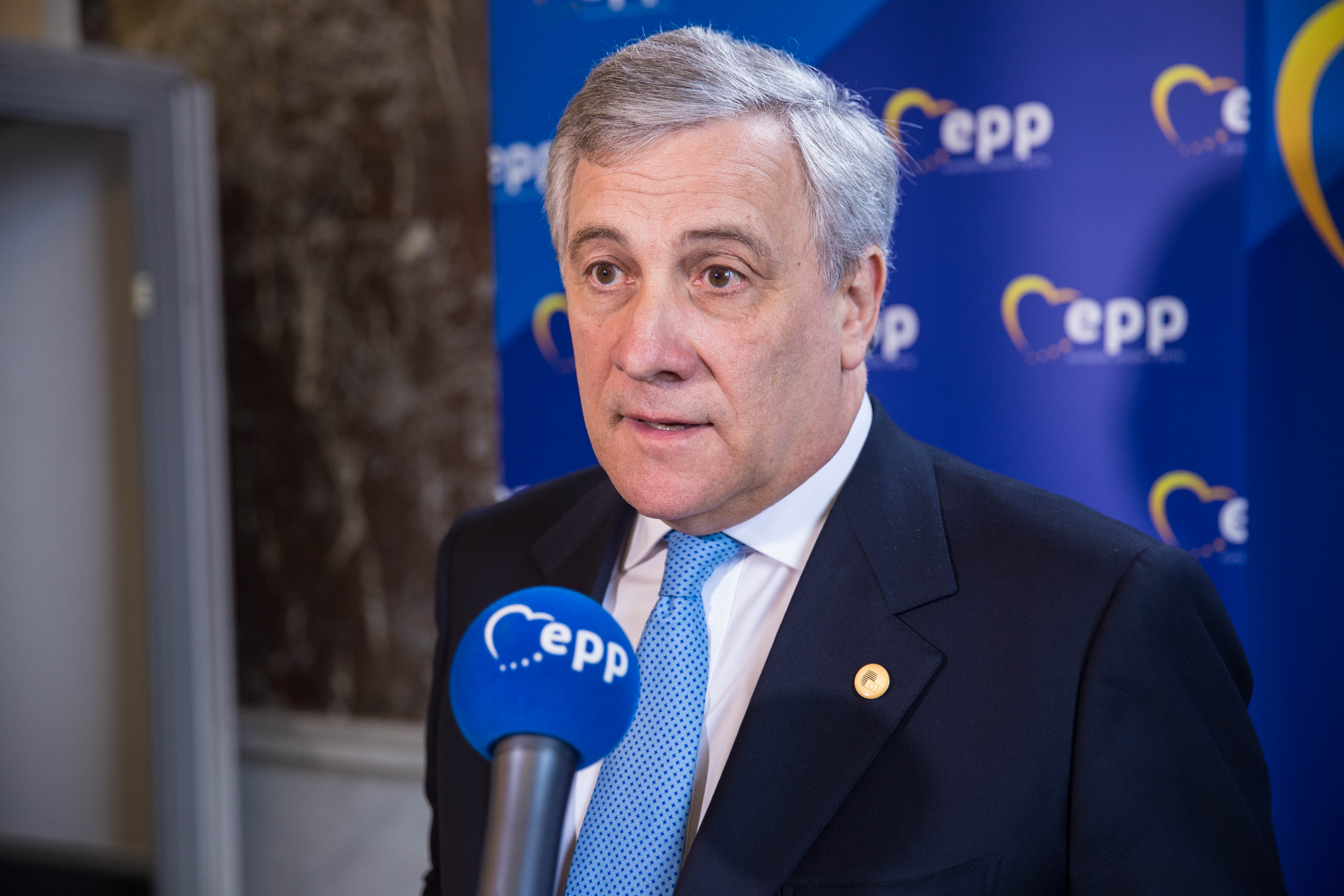
Antonio Tajani, President of the European Parliament from 2017 to 2019

In the 2016 Milan municipal election, FI found a strong candidate for mayor in Stefano Parisi, a former director-general of Confindustria and CEO of Fastweb, who pulled the party to 20.2% (virtually double than the LN's score), but narrowly lost to his Democratic opponent in the run-off, Giuseppe Sala. After the election, FI was basically divided in two camps: one led by Parisi, who did not officially joined the party and proposed a more traditional centre-right "liberal-popular" path, and the other led by Toti, who had formed a strong partnership with Roberto Maroni and Luca Zaia, the LN's presidents of Lombardy and Veneto, and was supportive of a full-scale alliance with LN and, possibly, of its leader Matteo Salvini's bid to become the leader of the centre-right coalition. In November, when it was clear that Parisi would not come to terms with Salvini, Berlusconi disowned Parisi, who responded by launching his own Energies for Italy (EpI) party.

Since then, the party has strengthened its position in parliament, thanks to an influx of MPs from other parties, including several returning after years of dissent. In August 2016, the party was re-joined by two senators, including Renato Schifani from the NCD and another from the ALA. In November came Mario Mauro and his Populars for Italy (PpI). Since June 2017, the party was joined by three deputies and one senator from Popular Alternative (AP, ex-NCD), one deputy and one senator from the Mixed Group (ex-Five Star Movement, M5S), one deputy from Direction Italy (DI, ex-CR), one from Solidary Democracy (Demo.S), one from Act! (F!, ex-LN) and two senators from the ALA. Particularly, Enrico Costa left AP and resigned from minister of Regional Affairs in Paolo Gentiloni's centre-left government, aiming at forming a "liberal centre" with FI. In the context of a more united centre-right, Costa might form the "fourth leg" of the coalition, after the LN, FI and the FdI, by uniting other AP splinters, DI, F!, Identity and Action (IdeA), the Italian Liberal Party (PLI), the Union of the Centre (UdC), and the Pensioners' Party (PP), all variously affiliated with FI and the centre-right. Not all FI members were happy with all that; in fact, two senators and one deputy, Daniela Santanchè, switched to the FdI. In January 2017, Antonio Tajani was elected President of the European Parliament, the first Italian since Emilio Colombo (1977–1979).

=== 2018 general and 2019 EP elections ===
In the 2018 general election, FI obtained 14.0% of the vote and was overtaken by the LN for the first time as the largest party of the centre-right. After the election, long-time FI senator Elisabetta Casellati, was appointed President of the Senate, with centre-right's and M5S' support. After months of negotiations, the centre-right fragmented as the LN chose to team up with the M5S and formed a yellow-green government, also dubbed as Government of Change, under Prime Minister Giuseppe Conte. In July, Berlusconi appointed Tajani, the party's candidate for prime minister in the 2018 general election, vice president and Adriano Galliani coordinator of departments, in an effort to restructure the party, which was shrinking in opinion polls.

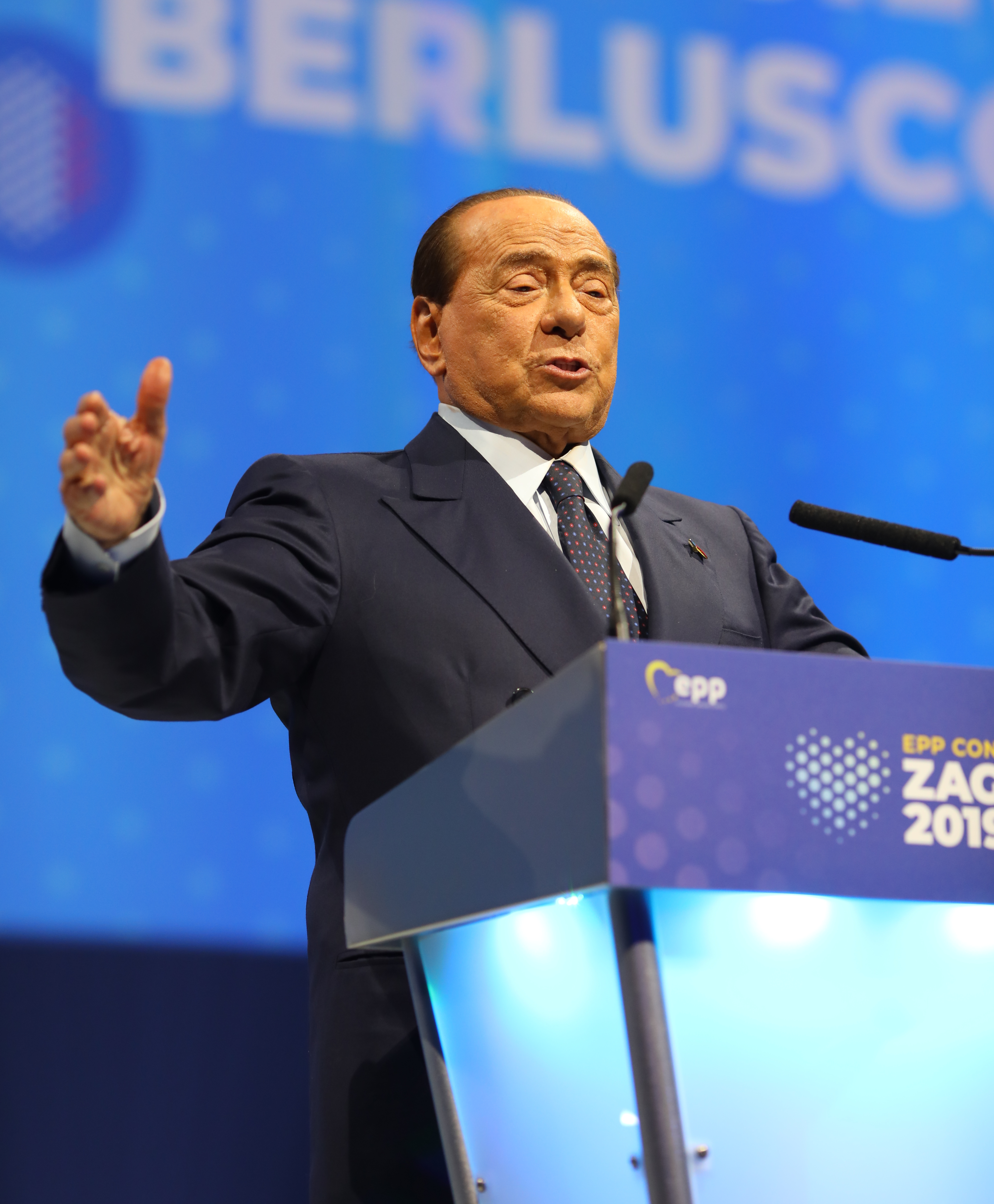
Berlusconi at the European People's Party Congress in 2019

Berlusconi ran in the 2019 European Parliament election as FI's top candidate in all Italian constituencies, except for central Italy. In the election, FI received only 8.8% of the vote, its worst result ever. Berlusconi joined the European Parliament as the oldest member of the assembly. In June, Berlusconi appointed Toti and Carfagna national coordinators, with the goal of reforming and relaunching the party. However, after a few weeks, Toti left the party in opposition to Berlusconi and launched Cambiamo!. One of the main reasons for the split was Toti's support of an alliance with the League and the Brothers of Italy (FdI) at national-level, about which Berlusconi was reticent and Carfagna against.

=== Draghi's national unity government ===
In January 2021, Conte's second government fell after losing support from Matteo Renzi's Italia Viva party. Subsequently, President Mattarella appointed Mario Draghi to form a cabinet, which won support from FI, the League, the PD and the M5S. FI was given three ministers in the new government: Renato Brunetta at Public Administration, Mariastella Gelmini at Regional Affairs and Mara Carfagna at the South.

In July 2022, the M5S did not participate in a Senate's confidence vote on a government bill. Prime Minister Draghi offered his resignation, which was rejected by President Mattarella. After a few days, Draghi sought a confidence vote again to secure the government majority supporting his cabinet, while rejecting the proposal put forward by Lega and FI of a new government without the M5S. In that occasion, FI as well as the M5S, Lega and FdI, did not participate in the vote. Consequently, Draghi tendered his final resignation to President Mattarella, who dissolved the houses of Parliament, leading to a snap election. The party's abstention led some leading members of FI, notably including the three ministers Brunetta, Gelmini and Carfagna, to leave the party.

=== Meloni government and Berlusconi's death ===
In the 2022 general election, FI, which was part of the winning centre-right coalition, won 8.1% of the vote, compared to FdI's 26.0% and the League's 8.8%. As a result, Giorgia Meloni, leader of FdI, accepted the task of forming a new government and announced the Meloni Cabinet, which assumed official functions after each ministers were sworn in on 22 October. FI joined the new government with five ministers, notably including Tajani as deputy prime minister and minister of Foreign Affairs.

On 12 June 2023, Berlusconi died, leaving the party's future in uncertainty. The Italian government, led by Meloni, proclaimed a national day of mourning for the day of the funeral, also ordering that flags be flown half mast for three days. On 14 June, Berlusconi's state funeral was officiated in the Ambrosian Rite in the Milan Cathedral by Mario Delpini, the Archbishop of Milan; the funeral was attended, among others, by President Mattarella, Meloni and the entire government, as well as opposition leaders and foreign heads of state or government. A few days after Berlusconi's death, the party announced that a national council would be summoned before the end of summer to appoint an acting president and determine the road map toward the national congress that would elect the new party's leadership.

=== Leadership of Tajani and 2024 European election ===
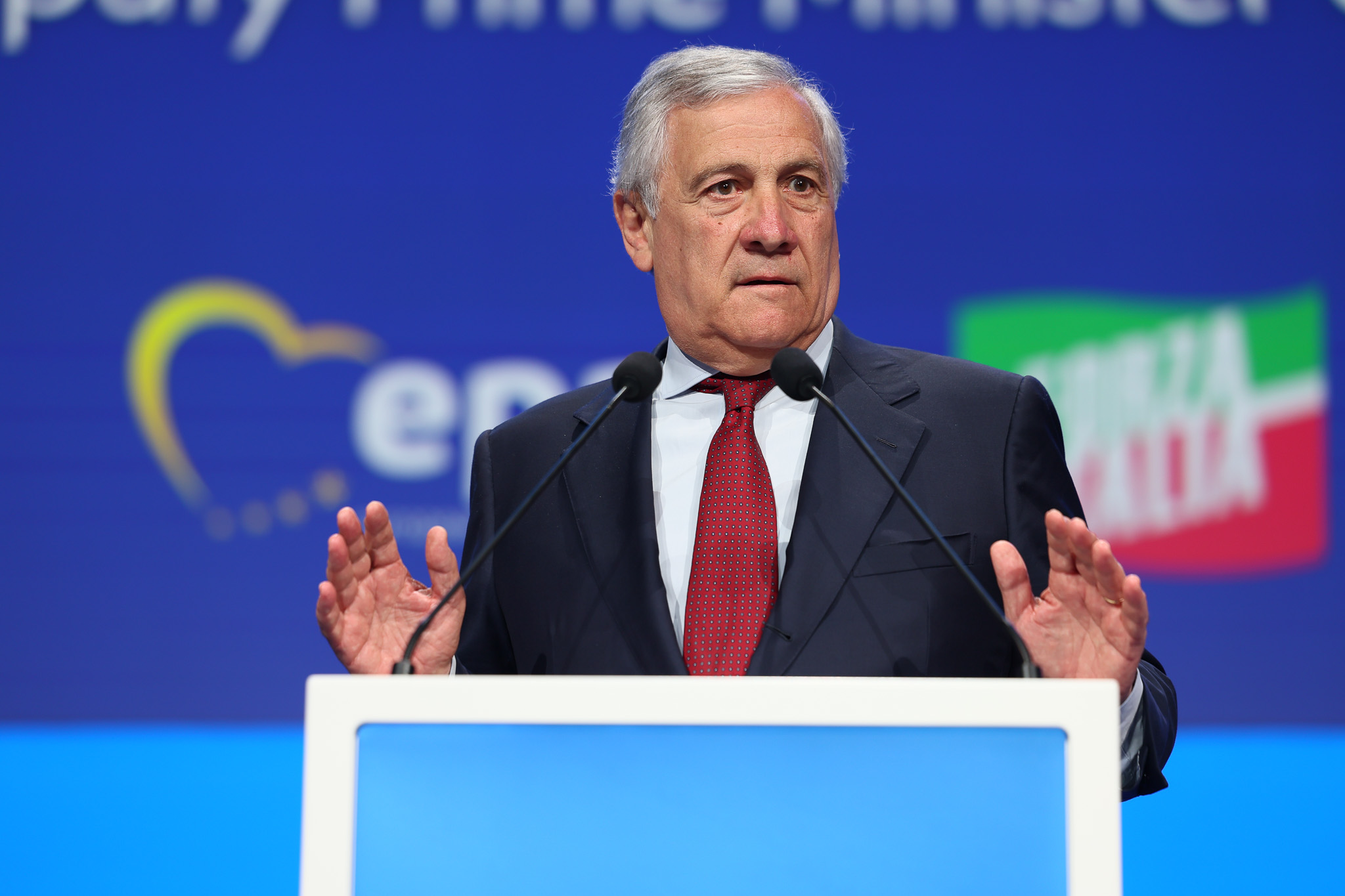
Antonio Tajani speaking at the 2025 EPP summit

In July 2023, the party's national council amended the party's statute by removing the post of president, which would be forever associated with Berlusconi (including in the party's symbol), and introducing the post of secretary. Contextually, Tajani was unanimously elected secretary. In February 2024, the party held its first national congress. Tajani was unanimously re-elected secretary, along with four deputy secretaries (Stefano Benigni, Deborah Bergamini, Alberto Cirio and Roberto Occhiuto), while Renato Schifani was appointed president of the national council.

In the run-up of the 2024 European Parliament election, FI formed a joint list with Us Moderates, signed an electoral pact with the South Tyrolean People's Party and welcomed candidates of the Sardinian Reformers. Additionally, FI or individual FI candidates were endorsed by Coraggio Italia, the Movement for Autonomy, Future Sicily, Christian Democracy, New Times – United Populars, other minor or local Christian-democratic groups and the Transnational Radical Party Moreover, a number of former members of Lega Nord, notably including Flavio Tosi (former leader of Liga Veneta, now leader of FI in Veneto), Alessandro Sorte (leader of FI in Lombardy), Roberto Cota (former president of Piedmont), Marco Reguzzoni (former floor leader of Lega Nord in the Chamber of Deputies), Massimiliano Bastoni (former member of Lega Nord's right-wing and leading Padanian nationalist), Matteo Gazzini (outgoing MEP and leader of FI in South Tyrol) and Stefania Zambelli (outgoing MEP), formed, within the party, a coalition named "Forza Nord". In the election, the party took 9.6% of the vote, improving its results from 2019 and electing 8 MEPs. Contextually, it retained the helm of Piedmont with Alberto Cirio in the regional election there. In September 2024, FI was admitted into the International Democracy Union. In the 2025 regional elections the party improved its tallies virtually everywhere. FI did remarkably well in Aosta Valley, where it joined the regional government as junior partner of the Valdostan Union, and Calabria, where Roberto Occhiuto was re-elected president and three lists formed by FI members obtained a combined score of 31.4% of the vote.

== Ideology and factions ==
FI's ideology is similar to that of its predecessor, The People of Freedom (PdL), a big tent Centre-right party including Christian democrats, liberals, conservatives, and social democrats. FI presents itself as a "liberal", "Catholic", "reformist", and "moderate" alternative to the political left in alliance with the political right but not rightist itself. The PdL's break-up and the exit of the New Centre-Right (NCD) left FI with a more liberal base. Generally speaking, with the long-prepared return to FI, Berlusconi aimed at returning to the party's "liberal roots"; in doing so, he reinforced his ties with those liberals, like Antonio Martino, who had been marginalised in the PdL, while losing many of its Christian democrats and conservatives to the NCD. After NCD's internal struggles, its transformation into Popular Alternative (AP) and several splits, some NCD conservatives have returned to FI. In 2015, FI lost several liberal MPs, who formed the Liberal Popular Alliance in support to Matteo Renzi's cabinet.

FI includes several factions and ideological trends. The party's leading faction was long not an organised one: named the "magic circle" by journalists (a reference to a defunct faction within Lega Nord), it was composed of Berlusconi's closest allies, notably including Giovanni Toti, Mariarosaria Rossi, Deborah Bergamini, and Francesca Pascale (Berlusconi's partner). Since being elected President of Liguria in 2015, Toti became more autonomous from Berlusconi and more and more a strong supporter of closer ties with Lega Nord. In 2018, Toti lost the title of "political counselor" (the closest thing to a number two so far) and Berlusconi appointed Antonio Tajani as vice president. In 2019, Toti finally left the party.

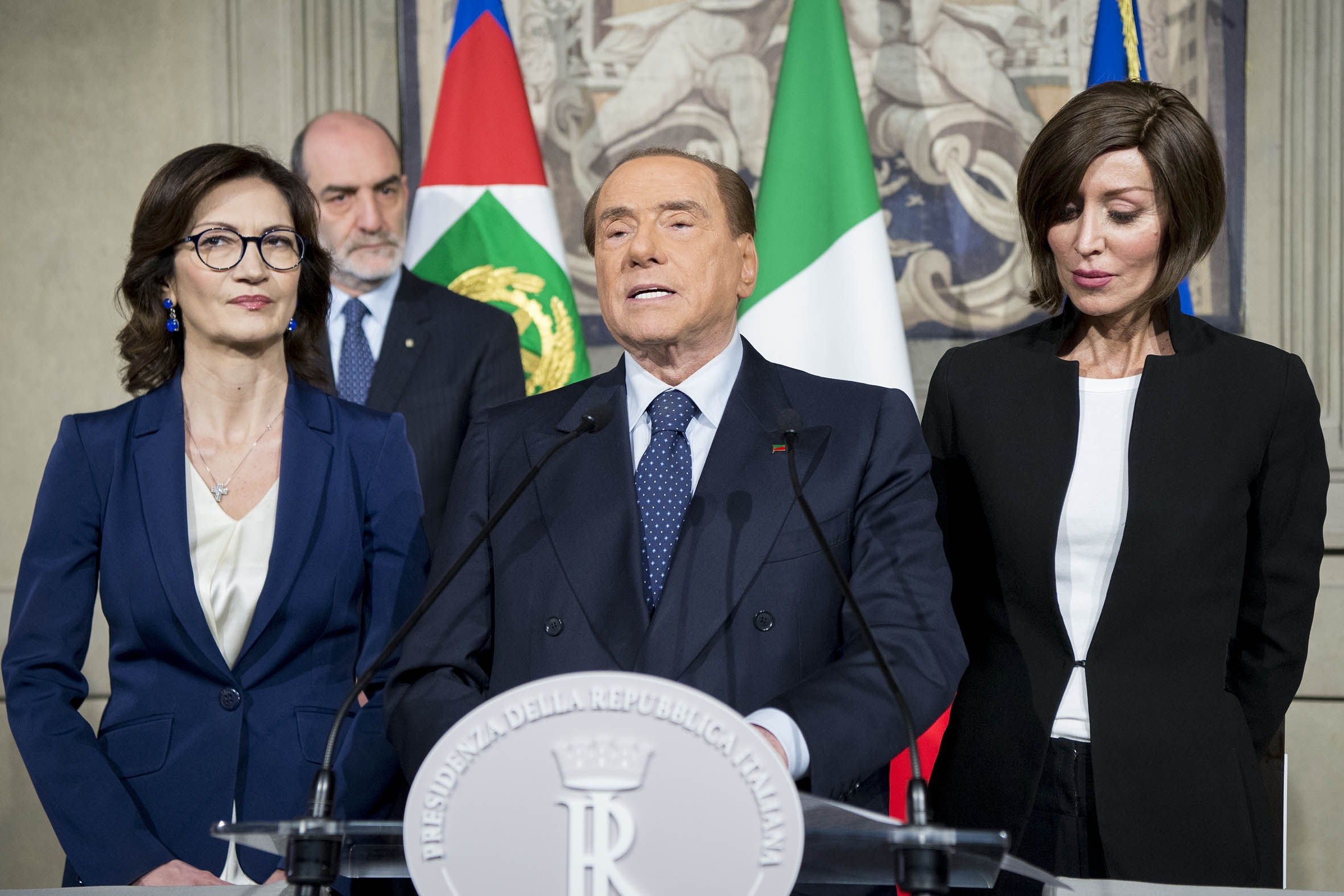
Berlusconi with then FI's leaders in the Parliament, Mariastella Gelmini and Anna Maria Bernini

On social issues, most FI politicians are conservative, even though a minority of them can be considered liberal. According to an article from Corriere della Sera, on the so-called "ethical issues" like abortion and LGBT rights, the party aimed at returning to its 1994's original values, including "liberalism, the socialist roots, even the radical component", respected its MPs' "freedom of conscience", and was open to civil unions, while NCD's positions were "closer to those of the European traditionalist right". In October 2014, Berlusconi personally endorsed Renzi's proposals on civil unions for gays and a quicker path to citizenship to Italian-born children of immigrants; however, the party remained socially conservative. FI clarified that it considers marriage solely as the union between a man and a woman. The majority of its members voted against civil unions, whereas the NCD voted in favour. Moreover, the party is critical of teaching gender studies in schools. Party members are generally opposed to abortion and seek to limit access to them and euthanasia; FI's MEPs were divided on the vote on the resolution proposed by the European Citizens' Initiative (ECI), "My voice, my choice", a project that wanted to provide support, including financial support, to member states in providing access to abortion for anyone in Europe who does not have full access to abortion yet. The party has criticised illegal immigration and the way it has been managed by centre-left coalition governments. It has also declared itself against the introduction of jus soli in Italy. In addition, the party is opposed to drug liberalisation, which it considers potentially negative for health and not useful for solving criminal matters. When FI's predecessors were in power, they restricted the legislation on the matter, with the Fini-Giovanardi law. Finally, FI considers Italy as a country with a Christian civilisation and favours displaying Christian symbols in public places.

On economic issues, FI is more supportive of the private rather than the public sector. It aims at representing business owners' interests and has often advocated for a reduction of taxation, red tape, and public expenditure. One of its latest proposals is the introduction of a flat tax. In addition, FI is more supportive of free trade agreements rather than protectionism. On foreign policy, the party supports the European Union (EU), despite elements of criticism, NATO, and a close relationship with the United States. FI also seeks good relations with Russia, especially in defence of the interests of Italian companies that export to the Russian market. The party is a member of the Europeanist, centre-right European People's Party (EPP). Whereas most of its members are supportive of the European Union (EU), the most notable example being Tajani (President of the European Parliament from 2017 to 2019), others are slightly Eurosceptic and have criticised the Euro and Germany's role in the EU. The party refuses the "Eurosceptic" label, while supporting a reform of the EU. In 2017 Berlusconi reconciled with Angela Merkel, Chancellor of Germany and one of the EPP leaders, after years of hostility, re-affirming his support to the European integration and his hostility towards populism.

== Popular support ==
The electoral results of the FI in general (Chamber of Deputies) and European Parliament elections since 2014 are shown in the chart below.

== Election results ==
=== Italian Parliament ===
Election	Leader	Chamber of Deputies					Senate of the Republic				
Election	Leader	Votes	%	Seats	+/–	Position	Votes	%	Seats	+/–	Position
2018	Silvio Berlusconi	4,596,956	14.0	106 / 630	New	4th	4,358,004	14.4	58 / 315	New	4th
2022	Silvio Berlusconi	2,278,217	8.1	45 / 400	▼61	▼5th	2,279,802	8.3	18 / 200	▼40	▼5th

=== European Parliament ===
Election	Leader	Votes	%	Seats	+/–	EP Group
2014	Silvio Berlusconi	4,614,364 (3rd)	16.8	13 / 73	New	EPP
2019	Silvio Berlusconi	2,351,673 (4th)	8.8	7 / 76	▼6	EPP
2024 (Note: Run in a joint list with Us Moderates.)	Antonio Tajani	2,243,030 (4th)	9.6	8 / 76	▲1	EPP

=== Regional Councils ===
Region	Election year	Votes	%	Seats	+/−	Status in legislature
Aosta Valley	2025	6,066 (4th)	10.05 (along with LRV)	4 / 35	▲4	Majority
Piedmont	2024	162,888 (4th)	9.85	5 / 50	▲1	Majority
Lombardy	2023	208,420 (4th)	7.23	6 / 80	▼8	Majority
South Tyrol	2023	1,625 (15th)	0.58	0 / 35	0	No seats
Trentino	2023	4,708 (12th)	2.02	0 / 35	▼1	No seats
Veneto	2025	105,375 (4th)	6.3	3 / 51	▲1	Majority
Friuli-Venezia Giulia	2023	26,329 (5th)	6.67	3 / 49	▼2	Majority
Emilia-Romagna	2024	83,998 (3rd)	5.62	2 / 50	▲1	Opposition
Liguria	2024	44,854 (5th)	7.98	3 / 31	▲2	Majority
Tuscany	2025	78,404 (5th)	6.17 (along with UDC)	2 / 41	▲1	Opposition
Marche	2025	48,823 (3rd)	8.6	3 / 31	▲1	Majority
Umbria	2024	31,128 (3rd)	9.69	2 / 21	▲1	Opposition
Lazio	2023	130,368 (5th)	8.43	3 / 50	▼3	Majority
Abruzzo	2024	77,841 (3rd)	13.44	4 / 31	▲1	Majority
Molise	2023	16,924 (3rd)	11.97	3 / 21	0	Majority
Campania	2025	215,419 (3rd)	10.72	6 / 51	▲4	Opposition
Apulia	2025	121,015 (4th)	9.11	5 / 51	▲1	Opposition
Basilicata	2024	34,018 (3rd)	13.01	3 / 21	0	Majority
Calabria	2025	136,501 (1st)	17.98	8 / 31	0	Majority
Sicily	2022	275,736 (2nd)	14.75	12 / 70	▼2	Majority
Sardinia	2024	43,171 (5th)	6.36	3 / 60	▼2	Opposition

== Leadership ==
2013–2023

- President: Silvio Berlusconi (2013–2023)
- Vice President: Antonio Tajani (2018–2023)
- Coordinator: Giovanni Toti (2019), Mara Carfagna (2019), Antonio Tajani (2021–2023)
  - Deputy Coordinator: Anna Maria Bernini (2021–2023), Alessandro Cattaneo (2023)
- Political Counselor: Giovanni Toti (2014–2018), Renato Schifani (2020–2023)
- Spokesperson: Deborah Bergamini (2014–2018), Giorgio Mulé (2018–2023)
- Organisational secretary: Gregorio Fontana (2015–2023)

2023–present

- Secretary: Antonio Tajani (2023–present)
  - First Deputy Secretary: Deborah Bergamini (2024–present)
  - Deputy Secretary: Stefano Benigni (2024–present), Alberto Cirio (2024–present), Roberto Occhiuto (2024–present)
- President of the National Council: Renato Schifani (2024–present)
- President of the National Board: Letizia Moratti (2023–present)
- Spokesperson: Raffaele Nevi (2023–present)
- Organisational secretary: Francesco Battistoni (2023–present)

Parliament

- Party Leader in the Chamber of Deputies: Renato Brunetta (2013–2018), Mariastella Gelmini (2018–2021), Roberto Occhiuto (2021), Paolo Barelli (2021–2022), Alessandro Cattaneo (2022–2023), Paolo Barelli (2023–2026), Enrico Costa (2026–present)
- Party Leader in the Senate: Paolo Romani (2013–2018), Anna Maria Bernini (2018–2022), Licia Ronzulli (2022–2023), Maurizio Gasparri (2023–2026), Stefania Craxi (2026–present)
- Party Leader in the European Parliament: Raffaele Baldassarre (2013–2014), Elisabetta Gardini (2014–2019), Antonio Tajani (2019–2022), Fulvio Martusciello (2022–present)

== Symbols ==
Official logo,
2013–present

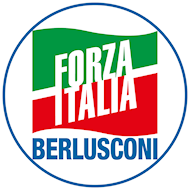
Electoral logo,
2014–2018

Electoral logo,
2018 general election

Electoral logo,
2019 European election

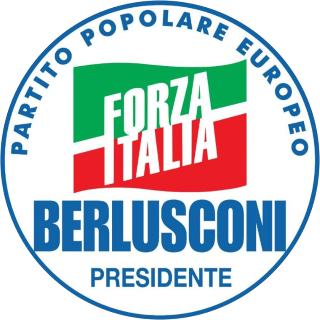
Electoral logo,
2022 general election

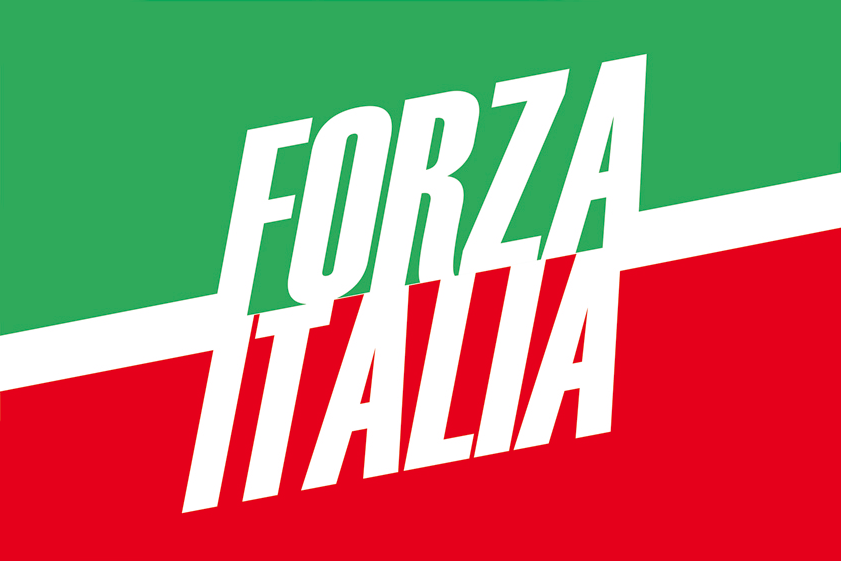
Party flag
