= Endorsements in the 2016 Italian constitutional referendum =

This page lists individuals and organisations who publicly expressed an opinion regarding the 2016 Italian constitutional referendum.

== Yes ==
=== Members of the government and institutions ===
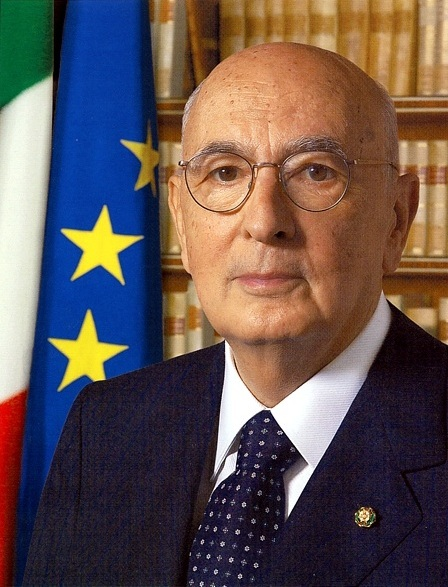
Giorgio Napolitano

==== Presidents of Italy ====
Former

- Giorgio Napolitano, 11th President of Italy (Independent)

==== Presidents of the Senate ====
Current

- Pietro Grasso, 39th President of the Senate (PD)

Former

- Franco Marini, 37th President of the Senate (PD)
- Marcello Pera, 36th President of the Senate (Independent)

==== Presidents of the Chamber of Deputies ====
Current

- Laura Boldrini, 41st President of the Chamber of Deputies (SI)

Former

- Pier Ferdinando Casini, 38th President of the Chamber of Deputies (UdC)
- Luciano Violante, 37th President of the Chamber of Deputies (PD)

==== Prime Ministers ====
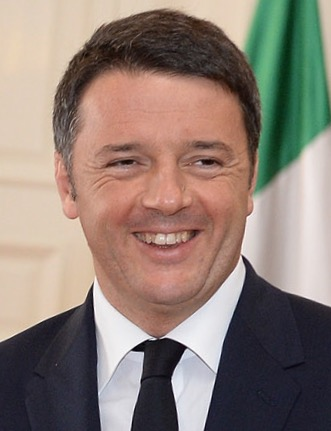
Matteo Renzi

Current

- Matteo Renzi, 56th Prime Minister (PD)

Former

- Giuliano Amato, 48th Prime Minister (PD)
- Enrico Letta, 55th Prime Minister (PD)
- Romano Prodi, 52nd Prime Minister (Independent)

==== Ministers ====
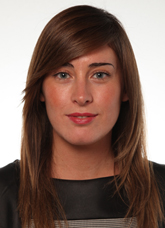
Maria Elena Boschi

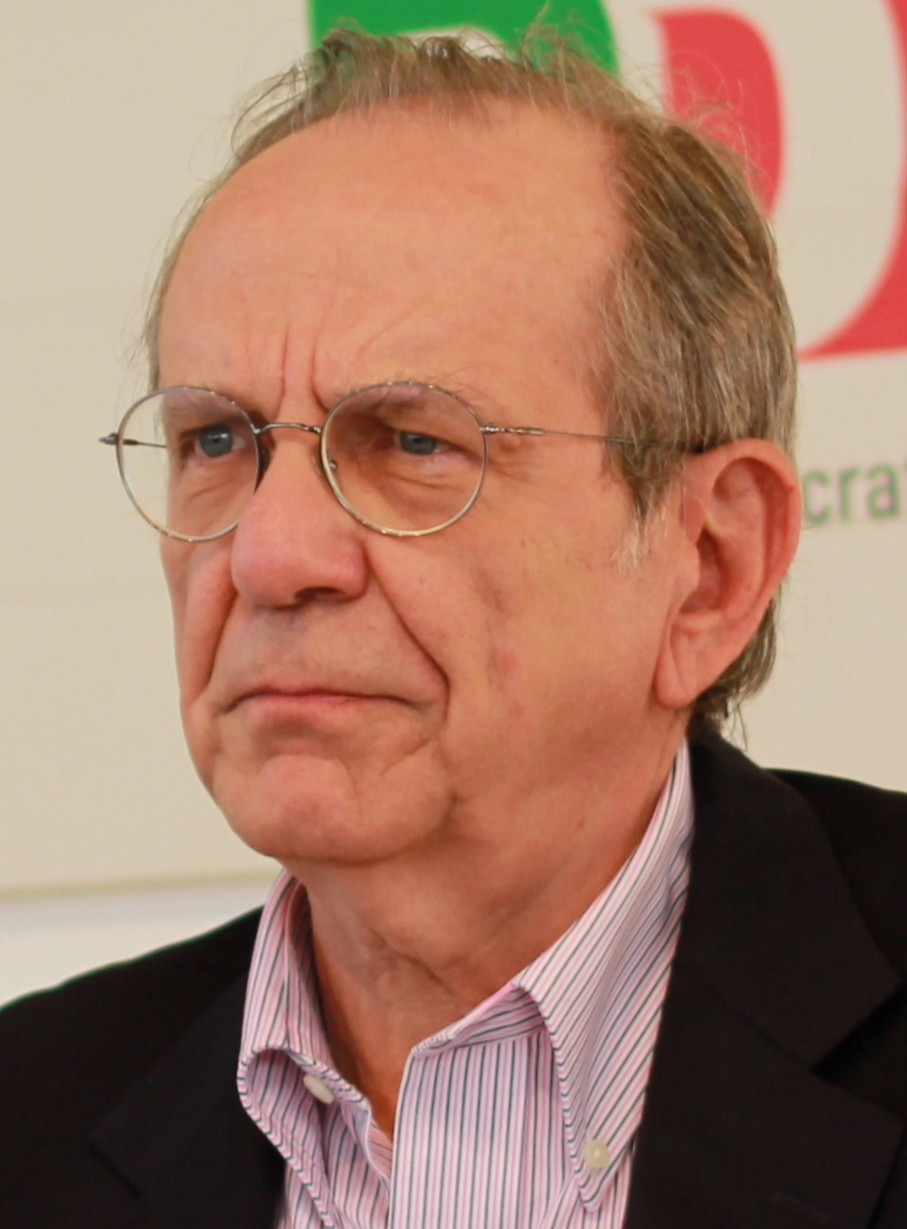
Pier Carlo Padoan

Current

- Angelino Alfano, Minister of the Interior (NCD)
- Maria Elena Boschi, Minister of Constitutional Reform (PD)
- Carlo Calenda, Minister of Economic Development (Independent)
- Enrico Costa, Minister of Regional Affairs and Autonomies (NCD)
- Graziano Delrio, Minister of Infrastructures and Transports (PD)
- Dario Franceschini, Minister of Culture and Tourism (PD)
- Gian Luca Galletti, Minister of Environment (UdC)
- Paolo Gentiloni, Minister of Foreign Affairs (PD)
- Stefania Giannini, Minister of Education, University and Research (PD)
- Beatrice Lorenzin, Minister of Health (NCD)
- Marianna Madia, Minister of Public Administration (PD)
- Maurizio Martina, Minister of Agriculture, Food and Forestry Policies (PD)
- Andrea Orlando, Minister of Justice (PD)
- Pier Carlo Padoan, Minister of Economy and Finance (Independent)
- Roberta Pinotti, Minister of Defense (PD)
- Giuliano Poletti, Minister of Labour and Social Policies (Independent)

Former

- Fabrizio Barca, Minister for Territorial Cohesion (PD)
- Emma Bonino, Minister of Foreign Affairs (RI)
- Paolo De Castro, Minister of Agriculture, Food and Forestry Policies (PD)
- Cesare Damiano, Minister of Labour (PD)
- Linda Lanzillotta, Minister for Regional Affairs (PD)
- Maurizio Lupi, Minister of Infrastructures and Transports (NCD)
- Giuseppe Fioroni, Minister of Education (PD)
- Giovanna Melandri, Minister of Youth Policies and Sports (PD)
- Arturo Parisi, Minister of Defense (PD)
- Francesco Rutelli, Minister of Cultural Heritage and Tourism (PD)

=== Members of local governments ===
==== President of Regions ====
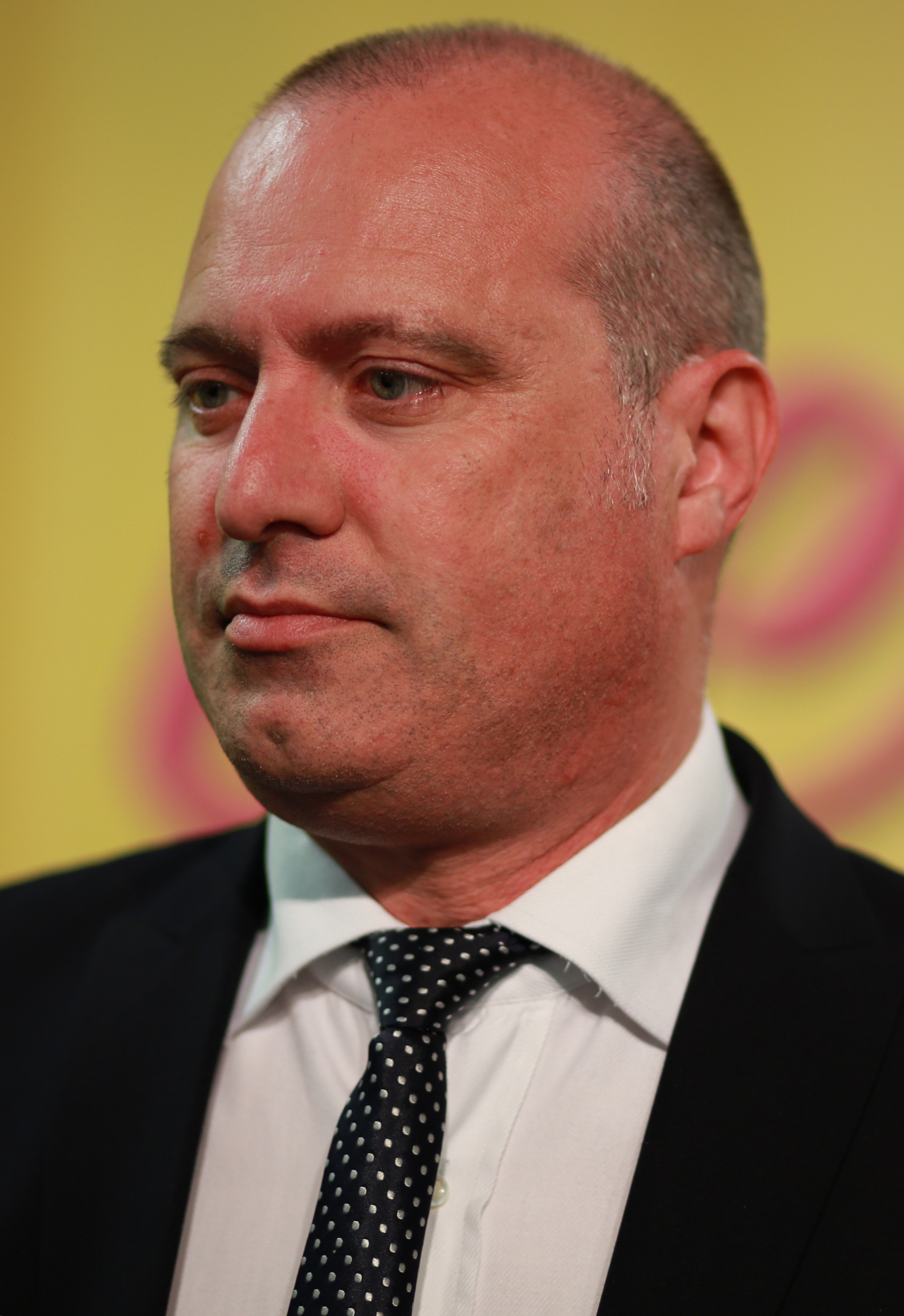
Stefano Bonaccini

Current

- Stefano Bonaccini, President of Emilia-Romagna (PD)
- Luca Ceriscioli, President of Marche (PD)
- Sergio Chiamparino, President of Piedmont (PD)
- Rosario Crocetta, President of Sicily (PD)
- Vincenzo De Luca, President of Campania (PD)
- Catiuscia Marini, President of Umbria (PD)
- Mario Oliverio, President of Calabria (PD)
- Francesco Pigliaru, President of Sardinia (PD)
- Augusto Rollandin, President of Aosta Valley (UV)
- Enrico Rossi, President of Tuscany (PD)
- Ugo Rossi, President of Trentino-Alto Adige/Südtirol (PATT)
- Debora Serracchiani, President of Friuli-Venezia Giulia (PD)
- Nicola Zingaretti, President of Lazio (PD)

==== Mayors of main cities ====
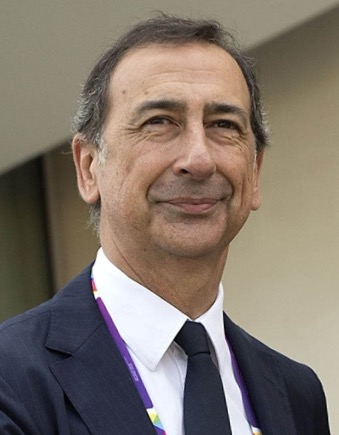
Giuseppe Sala

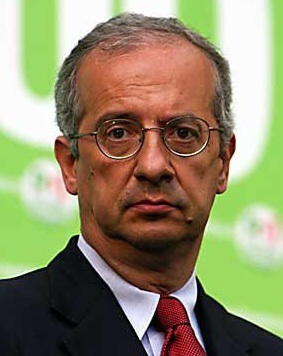
Walter Veltroni

Current

- Antonio Battista, Mayor of Campobasso (PD)
- Enzo Bianco, Mayor of Catania (PD)
- Luigi Brugnaro, Mayor of Venice (Independent)
- Massimo Cialente, Mayor of L'Aquila (PD)
- Antonio Decaro, Mayor of Bari (PD)
- Valeria Mancinelli, Mayor of Ancona (PD)
- Virginio Merola, Mayor of Bologna (PD)
- Dario Nardella, Mayor of Florence (PD)
- Giuseppe Sala, Mayor of Milan (PD)
- Flavio Tosi, Mayor of Verona (F!)

Former

- Walter Veltroni, Mayor of Rome (PD)

=== Members of the Parliament ===
==== Members of the Chamber of Deputies ====
Current

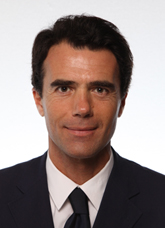
Sandro Gozi

- Ferdinando Adornato (AP)
- Paola Binetti (AP)
- Lorenza Bonaccorsi (PD)
- Rocco Buttiglione (AP)
- Salvatore Capone (PD)
- Maria Chiara Carrozza (PD)
- Mario Catania (SC)
- Andrea Causin (AP)
- Fabrizio Cicchitto (AP)
- Gianni Cuperlo (PD)
- Lorenzo Dellai (Demo.S)
- Marco Fedi (PD)
- Emanuele Fiano (PD)
- Roberto Giachetti (PD)
- Sandro Gozi (PD)
- Lorenzo Guerini (PD)
- Pia Elda Locatelli (PSI)
- Marco Meloni (PD)
- Alessia Morani (PD)
- Michele Nicoletti (PD)
- Matteo Orfini (PD)
- Giovanna Palma (PD)
- Lapo Pistelli (PD)
- Paola Pinna (PD)
- Lia Quartapelle (PD)
- Barbara Pollastrini (PD)
- Andrea Romano (PD)
- Gessica Rostellato (PD)
- Francesco Saverio Romano (ALA)
- Daniela Sbrollini (PD)
- Ivan Scalfarotto (PD)
- Marina Sereni (PD)
- Elisa Simoni (PD)
- Bruno Tabacci (CD)
- Liliana Ventricelli (PD)
- Valentina Vezzali (SC)
- Alessandro Zan (PD)
- Enrico Zanetti (SC)

Former

- Peppino Calderisi
- Mariotto Segni (Independent)

==== Members of the Senate ====
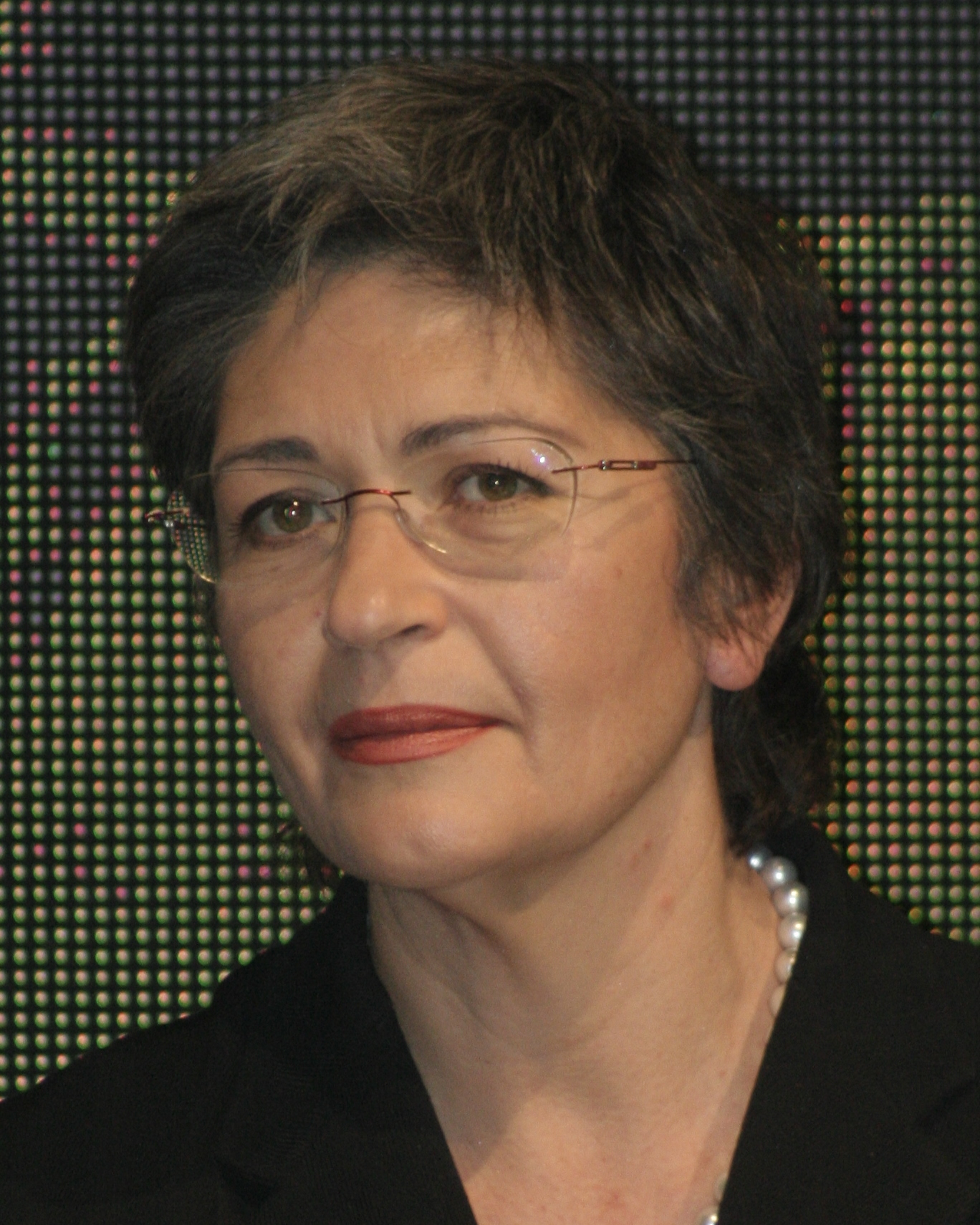
Anna Finocchiaro

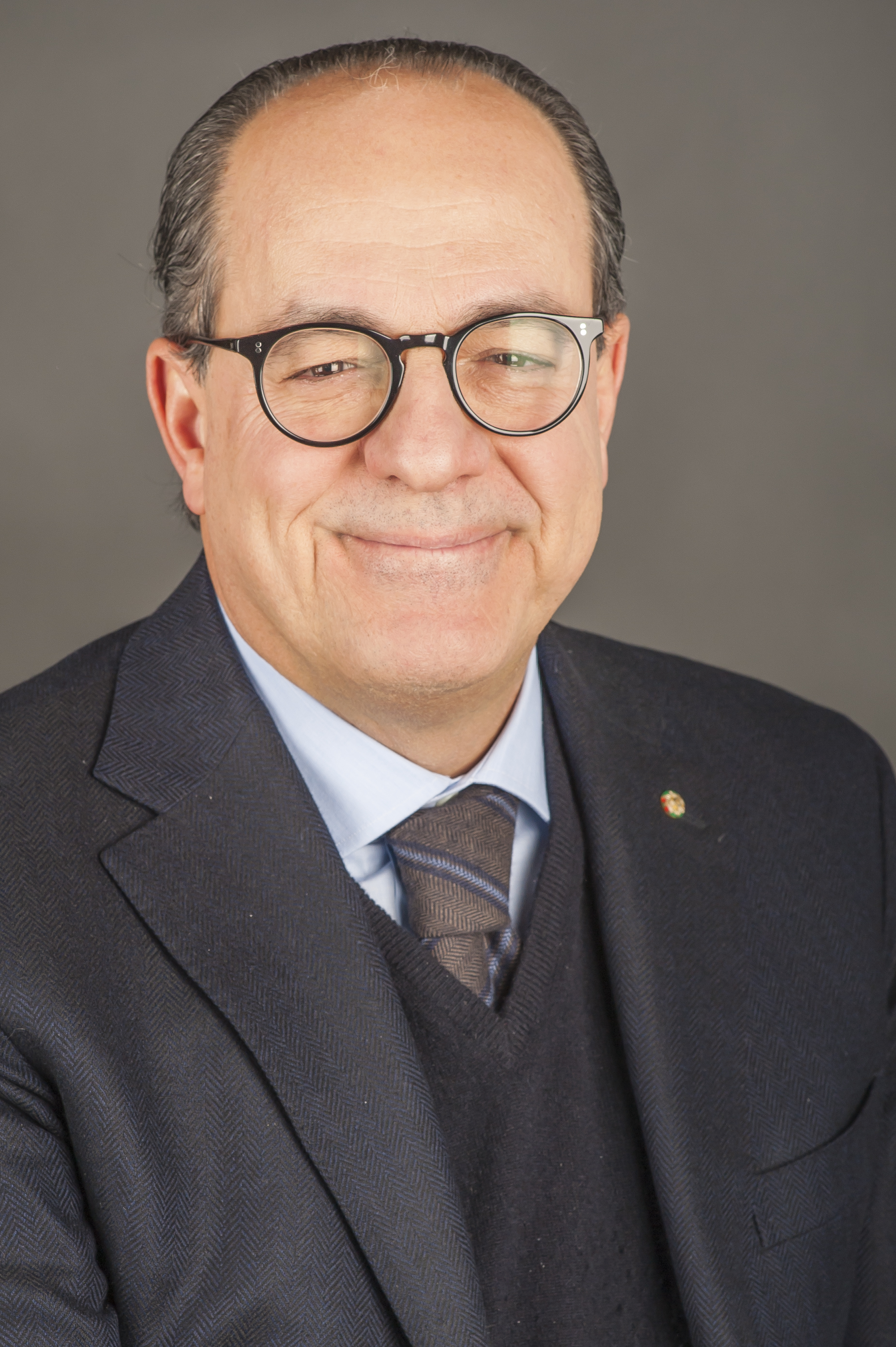
Paolo De Castro

- Piero Aiello (AP)
- Donatella Albano (PD)
- Silvana Amati (PD)
- Sandro Bondi (Independent)
- Elena Cattaneo (Independent)
- Felice Casson (PD)
- Antonio De Poli (AP)
- Benedetto Della Vedova (SC)
- Giuseppe Esposito (AP)
- Anna Finocchiaro (PD)
- Francesco Giacobbe (PD)
- Renato Guerino Turano (PD)
- Pietro Ichino (PD)
- Josefa Idem (PD)
- Giuseppe Lumia (IM–LC)
- Maurizio Migliavacca (PD
- Riccardo Nencini (PSI)
- Andrea Olivero (Demo.S)
- Laura Puppato (PD)
- Renzo Piano (Independent)
- Carlo Rubbia (Independent)
- Maurizio Sacconi (AP)
- Gianluca Susta (PD)
- Mario Tronti (PD)
- Denis Verdini (ALA)
- Karl Zeller (SVP)

=== Members of provincial councils ===
==== Former Members of provincial councils ====
- Donato Seppi Former Members of the Landtag of South Tyrol (Unitalia)

=== European institutions ===
==== Member of the European Parliament ====
- Simona Bonafé (PD)
- Mercedes Bresso (PD)
- Caterina Chinnici (PD)
- Nicola Danti (PD)
- Paolo De Castro (PD)
- Herbert Dorfmann (SVP)
- Roberto Gualtieri (PD)
- Cécile Kyenge (PD)
- Alessandra Moretti (PD)
- Damiano Zoffoli (PD)
- Alessia Mosca (PD)
- Pier Antonio Panzeri (PD)
- Giuseppina Picierno (PD)
- Gianni Pittella (PD)
- Patrizia Toia (PD)
- Flavio Zanonato (PD)

=== International political figures ===
Barack Obama

==== Head of states and governments ====
- Jean-Claude Juncker, President of the European Commission
- Barack Obama, 44th President of the United States
- Angela Merkel, Chancellor of Germany

==== National ministers and secretaries ====
- Thomas de Maiziere, Minister of the Interior of Germany
- Wolfgang Schaeuble, Minister of Finance of Germany

=== International organisations ===
- Organisation for Economic Co-operation and Development
- International Monetary Fund

=== Notable individuals ===
==== Businesspersons ====
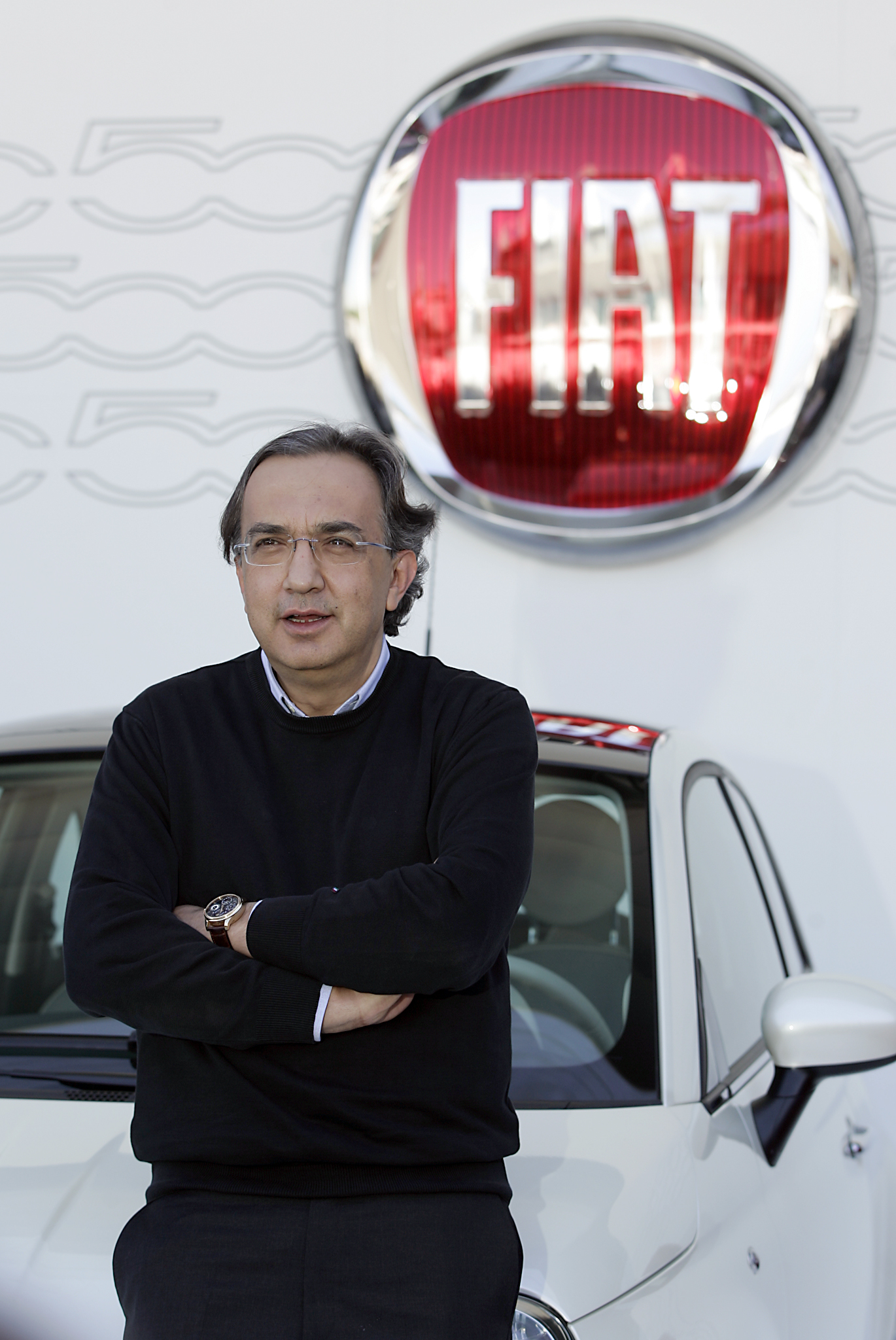
Sergio Marchionne

- Flavio Briatore, businessman
- Claudio Descalzi, CEO of Eni
- Sergio Marchionne, CEO of FCA
- Mauro Moretti, CEO of Finmeccanica
- Marco Tronchetti Provera, CEO of Pirelli

==== Presenters and journalists ====
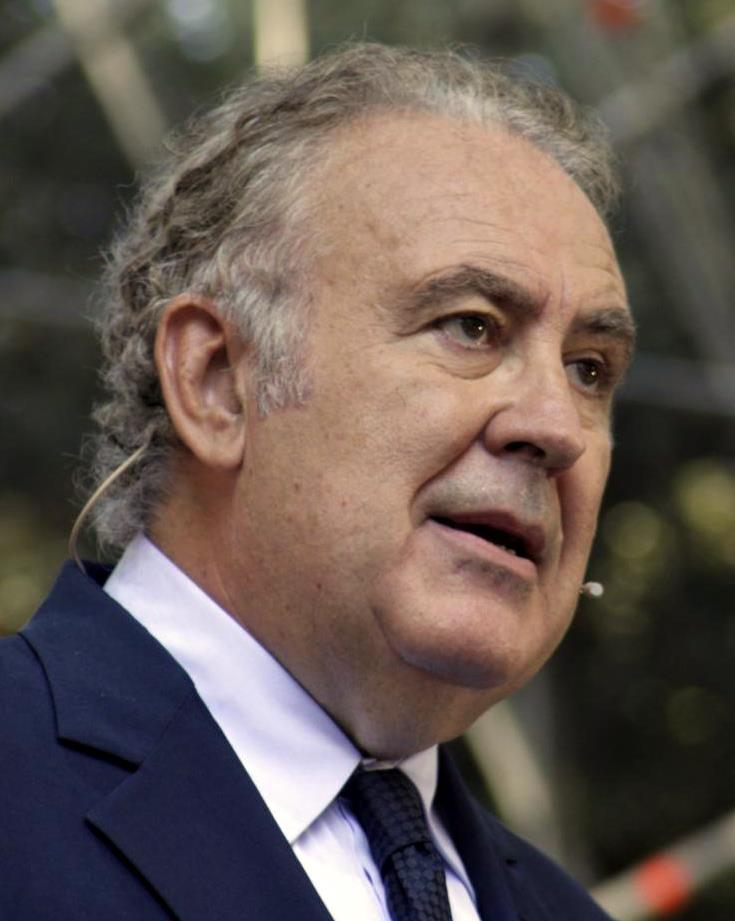
Michele Santoro

- Ilaria D'Amico, commentator and television host
- Gad Lerner, journalist, television presenter and writer
- Michele Santoro, journalist and television presenter
- Natasha Stefanenko, model and television presenter

==== University and academic figures ====
- Giuseppe Galasso, historian

==== Constitutional judges and lawyer ====
- Sabino Cassese, former judge of the Constitutional Court of Italy

==== University professors and judges letter ====
On 23 May, replying to the Constitutionalists letter standing for the "No", 193 judges and professors in various universities of Italy signed a letter to support the "Yes". Notable signatories included:

- Salvo Andò
- Franco Bassanini
- Guido Tabellini

==== Others ====
- Stefano Boeri, architect and urban planner
- Andrea Carandini, historian of arts

=== Celebrities ===
==== Actors and film directors ====
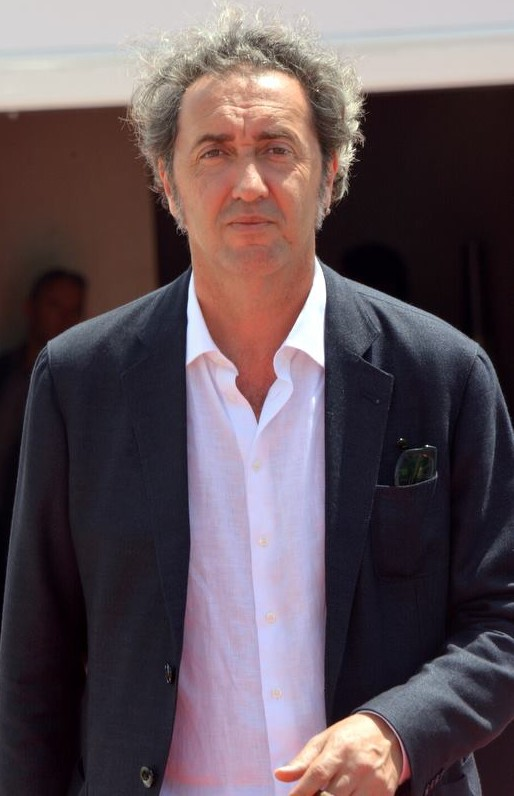
Paolo Sorrentino

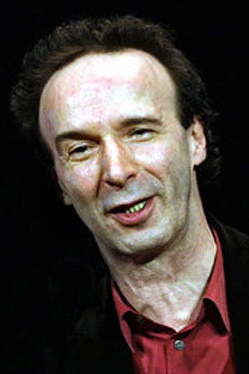
Roberto Benigni

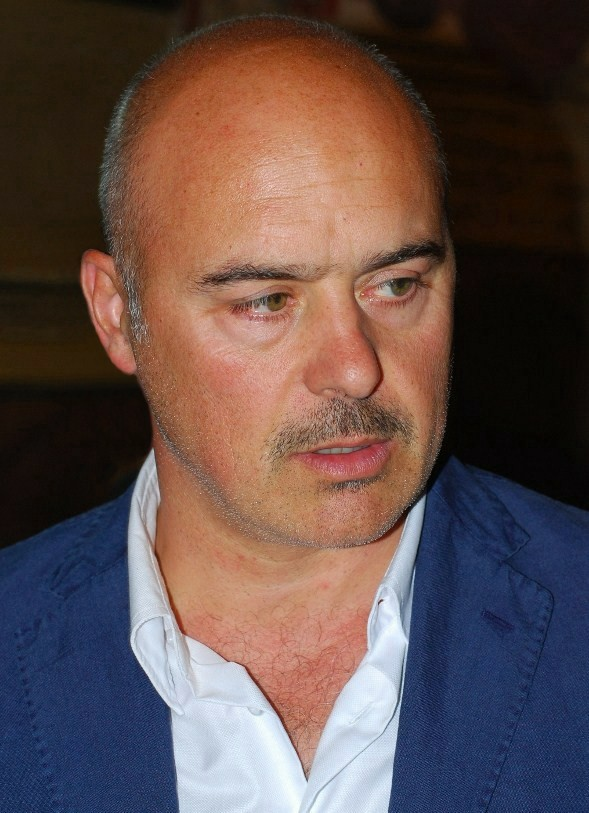
Luca Zingaretti

- Stefano Accorsi, actor
- Francesca Archibugi, film director
- Roberto Benigni, actor, comedian, screenwriter and film director
- Roberto Bolle, dancer
- Massimo Bottura, chef
- Liliana Cavani, film director
- Cristiana Capotondi, actress
- Cristina Comencini, film director and scriptwriter
- Ivan Cotroneo, film director and scriptwriter
- Emma Dante, writer and actress
- Fabio De Luigi, actor and comedian
- Pierfrancesco Favino, actor
- Isabella Ferrari, actress
- Beppe Fiorello, actor
- Carla Fracci, actress and ballet dancer
- Massimo Ghini, actor
- Simona Izzo, actress and film director
- Valeria Marini, model and actress
- Andrea Occhipinti, actor and producer
- Silvio Orlando, actor
- Ferzan Özpetek, film director and screenwriter
- Michele Placido, actor and film director
- Alessandro Preziosi, actor
- Gabriele Salvatores, film director and screenwriter
- Stefania Sandrelli, actress
- Giulio Scarpati, actor
- Elena Sofia Ricci, actress
- Paolo Sorrentino, film director and screenwriter
- Oliviero Toscani, photographer
- Ricky Tognazzi, actor and film director
- Pamela Villoresi, actress
- Paolo Virzì, film director and screenwriter
- Luca Zingaretti, actor

==== Singers and producers ====
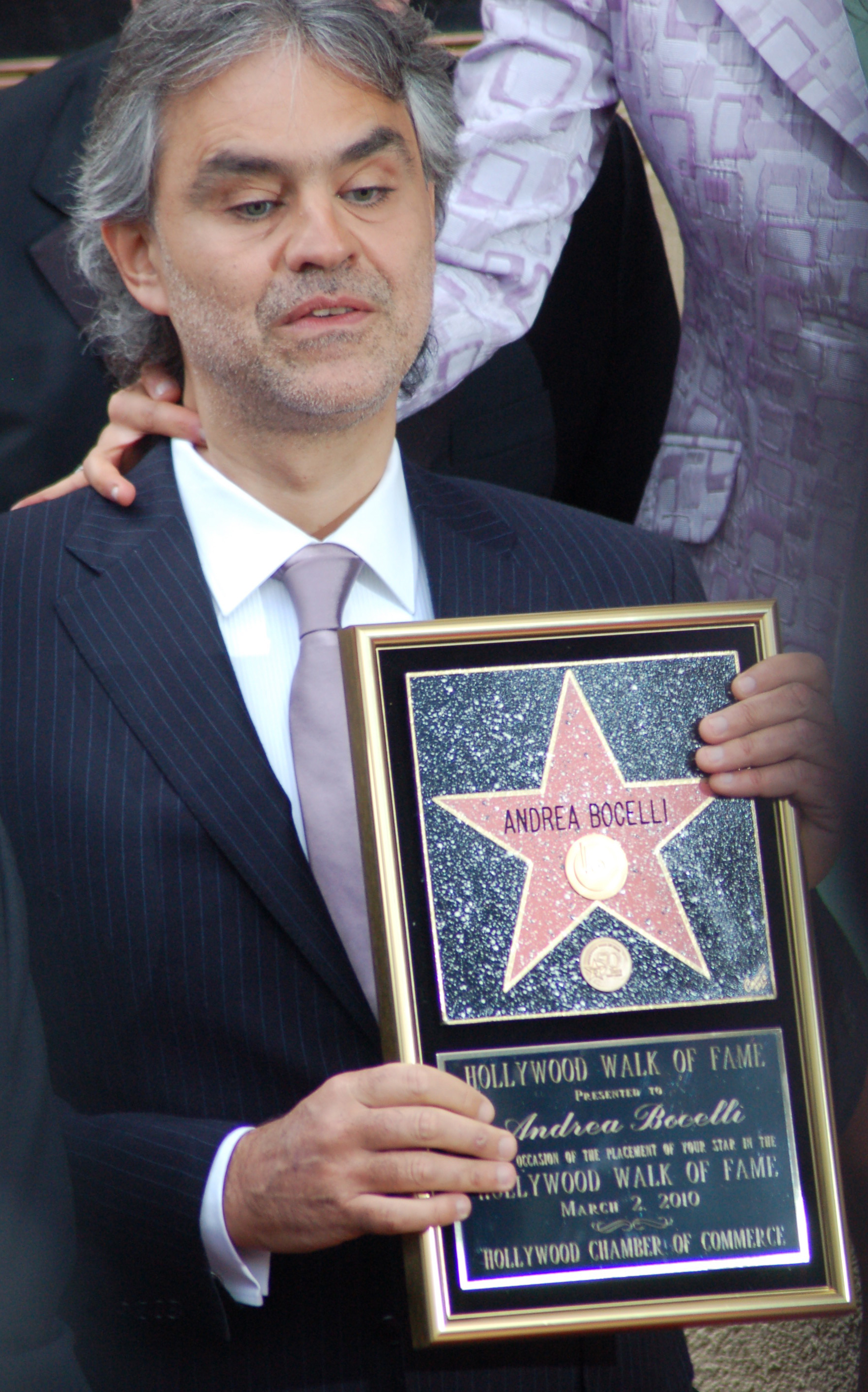
Andrea Bocelli

- Piero Barone, singer and member of Il Volo
- Andrea Bocelli, classical tenor
- Ignazio Boschetto, singer and member of Il Volo
- Caterina Caselli, singer and producer
- Gianluca Ginoble, singer and member of Il Volo
- Zubin Mehta, Indian conductor of Western classical music

==== Writers and artists ====
- Federico Moccia, writer
- Susanna Tamaro, novelist

==== Sportspeople ====
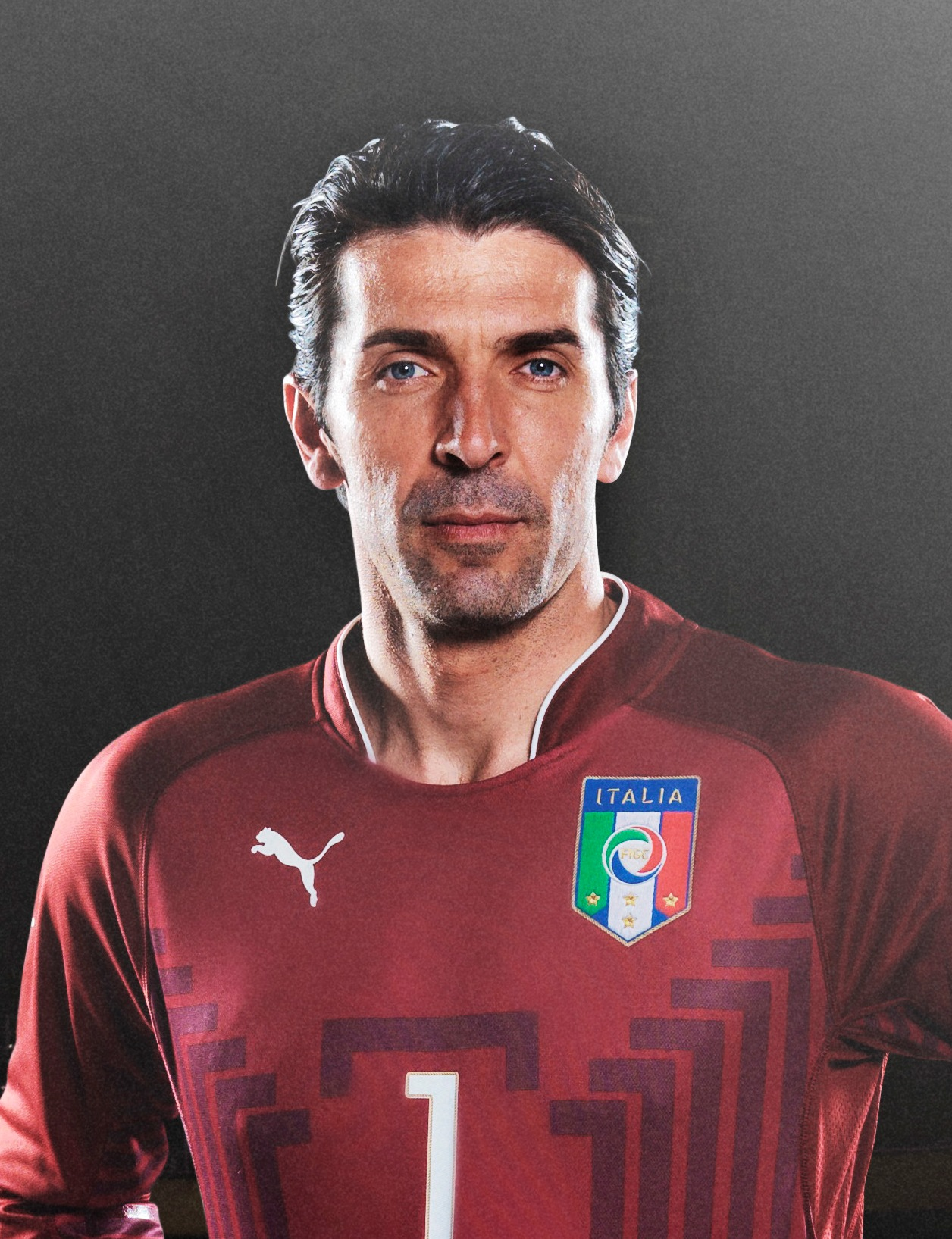
Gianluigi Buffon

- Gianluigi Buffon, football goalkeeper
- Marco Tardelli, former football player and manager
- Alex Zanardi, racing driver and paracyclist

=== Organisations ===
==== Committees ====
Logo	Campaign	Slogan	Website
	Just a Yes	Basta un Sì	www.bastaunsi.it

==== Main political parties ====
Parties	Political orientation	Leaders	Ref
Democratic Party (PD)	Social democracy	Matteo Renzi	
New Centre-Right (NCD)	Conservatism	Angelino Alfano	
Liberal Popular Alliance (ALA)	Centrism	Denis Verdini	
Civic Choice (SC)	Liberalism	Enrico Zanetti	
Italian Socialist Party (PSI)	Social democracy	Riccardo Nencini	
Act! (Fare)	Federalism	Flavio Tosi	
Democratic Centre (CD)	Christian left	Bruno Tabacci	
Italy of Values (IdV)	Populism	Ignazio Messina	

==== Minor parties ====
Parties	Political orientation	Leaders	Ref
South Tyrolean People's Party (SVP)	Regionalism	Philipp Achammer	
Trentino Tyrolean Autonomist Party (PATT)	Regionalism	Linda Tamanini	
Valdostan Union (UV)	Regionalism	Carlo Marzi	
Edelweiss (SA)	Regionalism	Ennio Pastoret	
Union for Trentino (UpT)	Regionalism	Fabio Pipinato	
Ladin Autonomist Union (UAL)	Progressivism	Michele Anesi	
Liberal Democrats (LD)	Liberalism	Daniela Melchiorre	
Italian Radicals (RI)	Liberalism	Emma Bonino	
Italian Republican Party (PRI)	Liberalism	Francesco Nucara	
Centrists for Sicily (CpS)	Christian democracy	Giampiero D'Alia	

==== European political parties ====
Parties	Political orientation	Leaders	Ref
Party of European Socialists (PES)	Social democracy	Sergei Stanishev	

==== Trade unions and business organisations ====
Organisations	Political and cultural orientation	Secretaries
General Confederation of Italian Industry (Confindustria)	Employers and businesses' organisation	Vincenzo Boccia
Italian Confederation of Workers' Trade Unions (CISL)	Christian democracy	Annamaria Furlan
National Confederation of Direct Growers (Coldiretti)	Direct growers' interests	Roberto Moncalvo
General Confederation of Italian Agriculture (Confagricoltura)	Farmers' interests	Mario Guidi
Italian Farmers' Confederation (CIA)	Farmers' interests	Dino Scanavino
Italian General Confederation of Enterprise, Professional Activities and Autonomous Work (Confcommercio)	Autonomous workers' interests	Corrado Augusto Patrignani

==== Newspapers ====
Newspapers	Political and cultural orientation
L'Unità	Social democracy
Il Foglio	Liberal conservatism
Avanti!	Social democracy
Blitz Quotidiano	Social liberalism

==== Periodicals ====
Periodicals	Political and cultural orientation
La Civiltà Cattolica	Periodical published by the Society of Jesus
Mondoperaio	Monthly journal, official organ of the Italian Socialist Party

==== Other organisations ====
Organisations	Political and cultural orientation	Leaders
Christian Associations of Italian Workers (ACLI)	Catholic social teaching	Roberto Rossini

== No ==
=== Members of the government and institutions ===
==== Presidents of the Senate ====
Former

- Renato Schifani, 38th President of the Senate (FI)

==== Presidents of the Chamber of Deputies ====
Former

- Gianfranco Fini, 40th President of the Chamber of Deputies (Independent)

==== Prime Ministers ====
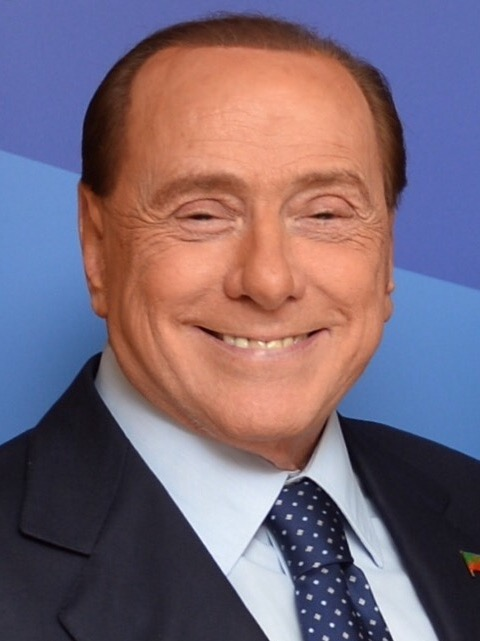
Silvio Berlusconi

Former

- Silvio Berlusconi, 50th Prime Minister (FI)
- Massimo D'Alema, 53rd Prime Minister (PD)
- Ciriaco De Mita, 47th Prime Minister (UdC)
- Lamberto Dini, 51st Prime Minister (Independent)
- Mario Monti, 54th Prime Minister (Independent)

==== Ministers ====
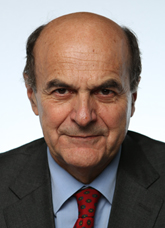
Pier Luigi Bersani

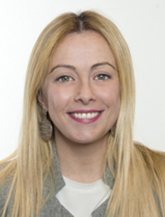
Giorgia Meloni

Former

- Pier Luigi Bersani, Minister of Economic Development (PD)
- Paolo Cirino Pomicino, Minister of Budget (UdC)
- Antonio Di Pietro, Minister of Infrastructures (IdV)
- Raffaele Fitto, Minister of Regional Affairs and Autonomies (CR)
- Giovanni Maria Flick, Minister of Justice (DC)
- Gaetano Quagliariello, Minister of Constitutional Reforms (IDEA)

=== Members of local governments ===
==== Mayors of main cities ====
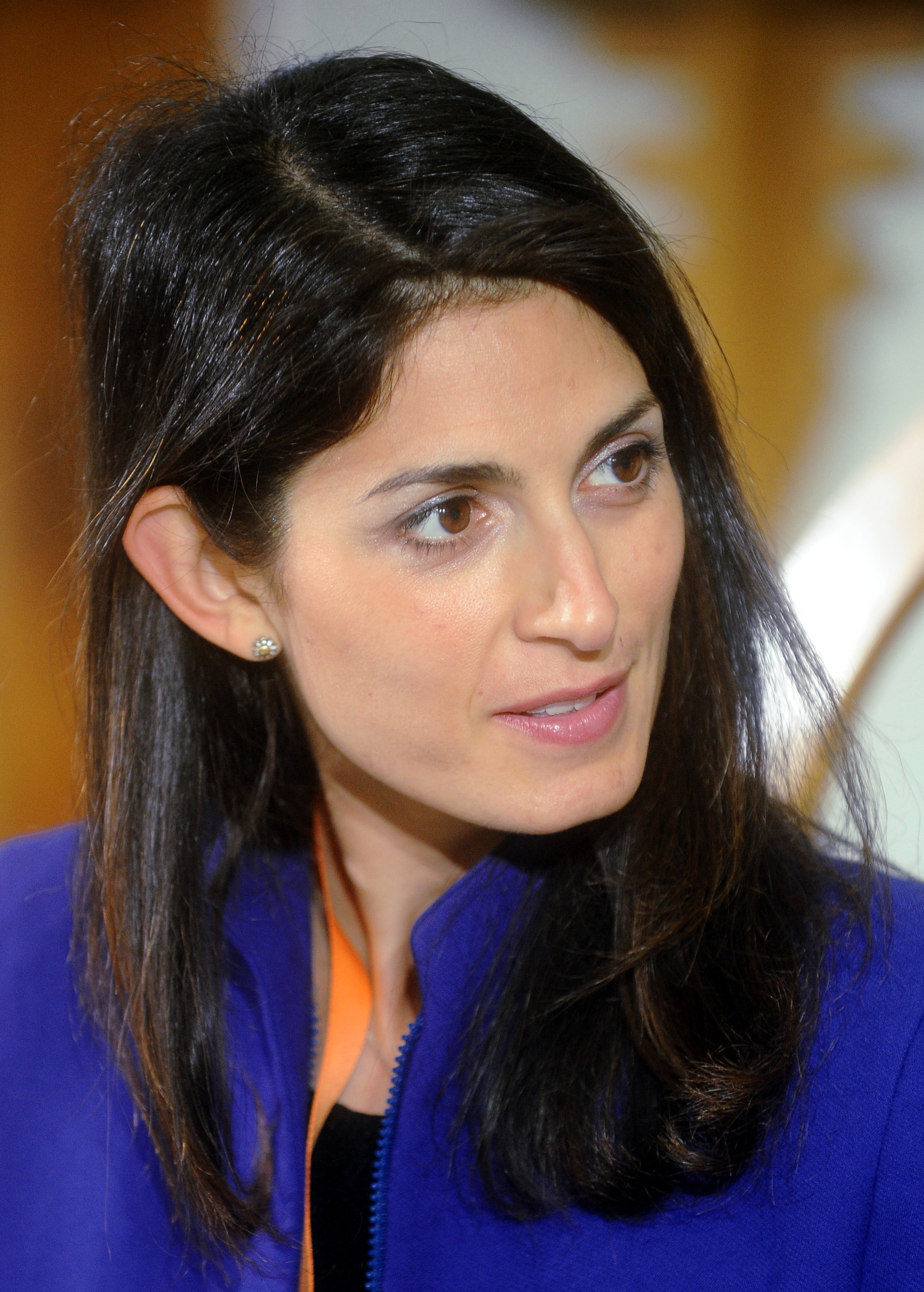
Virginia Raggi

Current

- Chiara Appendino, Mayor of Turin (M5S)
- Dario De Luca, Mayor of Potenza (FdI)
- Luigi de Magistris, Mayor of Naples (Independent)
- Roberto Dipiazza, Mayor of Trieste (FI)
- Marco Doria, Mayor of Genoa (Independent)
- Clemente Mastella, Mayor of Benevento (FI)
- Leoluca Orlando, Mayor of Palermo (SI)
- Virginia Raggi, Mayor of Rome (M5S)

=== Members of the Parliament ===
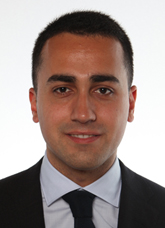
Luigi Di Maio

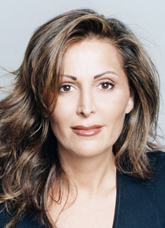
Daniela Santanchè

==== Members of the Chamber of Deputies ====
Current

- Antonio Angelucci (FI)
- Eleonora Bechis (P)
- Deborah Bergamini (FI)
- Michaela Biancofiore (FI)
- Annagrazia Calabria (FI)
- Daniele Capezzone (CR)
- Giuseppe Civati (P)
- Massimiliano Fedriga (LN)
- Alessandro Di Battista (M5S)
- Luigi Di Maio (M5S)
- Stefano Fassina (SI)
- Claudio Fava (SI)
- Nicola Fratoianni (SI)
- Roberto Fico (M5S)
- Nunzia De Girolamo (FI)
- Gabriella Giammanco (FI)
- Alberto Giorgetti (FI)
- Giancarlo Giorgetti (LN)
- Marta Grande (M5S)
- Antonio Martino (FI)
- Guglielmo Picchi (LN)
- Stefania Prestigiacomo (FI)
- Laura Ravetto (FI)
- Arcangelo Sannicandro (SI)
- Daniela Santanchè (FI)
- Elio Vito (FI)

Former

- Marco Follini
- Roberto Zaccaria
- Gianfranco Fini

==== Members of the Senate of the Republic ====
- Franco Carraro (FI)
- Gian Marco Centinaio (LN)
- Emilio Floris (FI)
- Paolo Galimberti (FI)
- Maurizio Gasparri (FI)
- Niccolò Ghedini (FI)
- Corradino Mineo (SI)
- Lucio Malan (FI)
- Marco Marin (FI)
- Altero Matteoli (FI)
- Michela Montevecchi (M5S)
- Mariarosaria Rossi (FI)

=== International figures ===
==== Member of the European Parliament ====
- Alessandra Mussolini (FI)

==== From other European Union member states ====
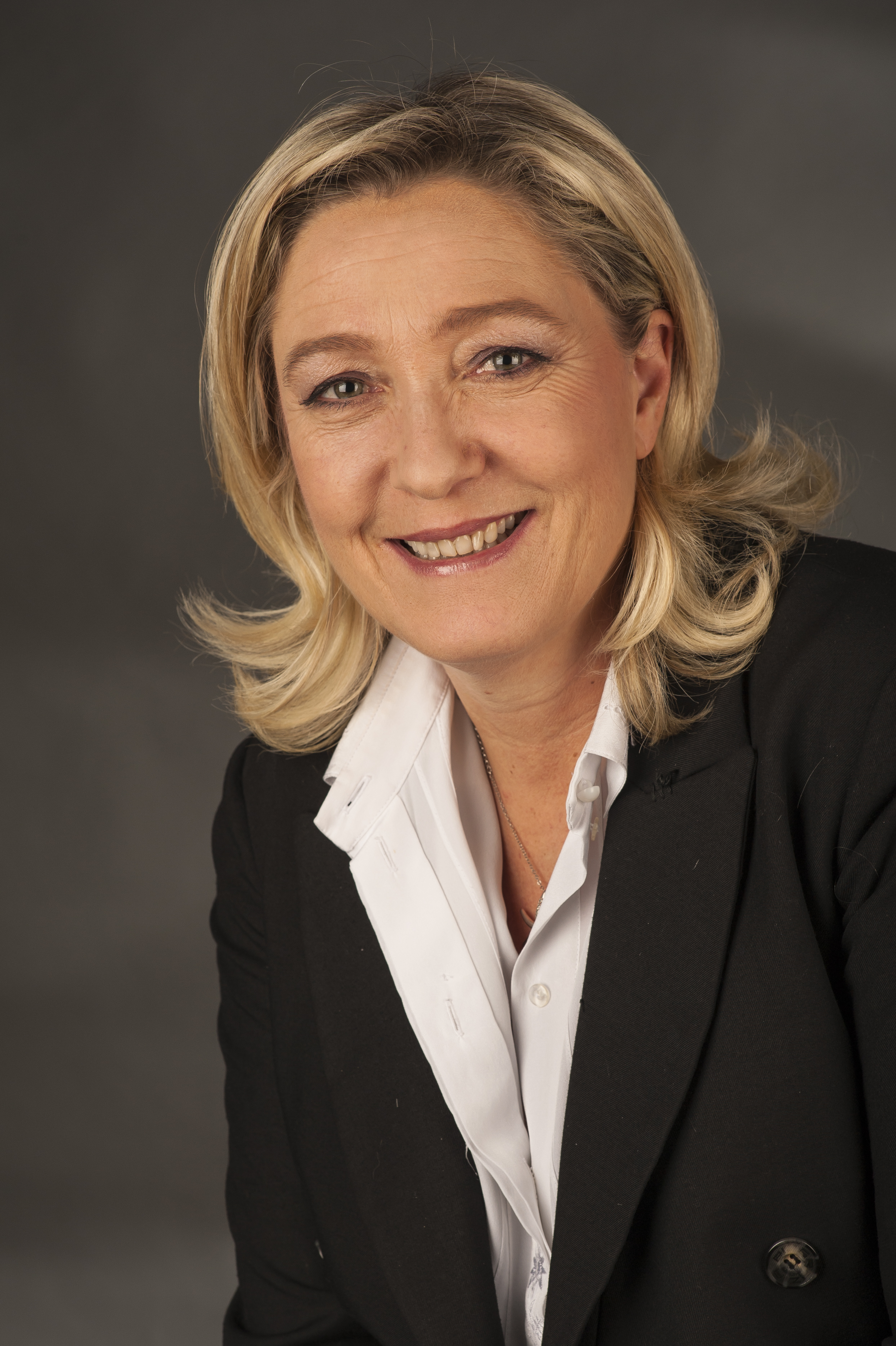
Marine Le Pen

- Pablo Bustinduy, Spanish politician and member of Podemos
- Nikolaos Chountis, Greek politician and MEP for Popular Unity
- Miguel Urbán Crespo, Spanish politician and MEP for Podemos
- Íñigo Errejón, Spanish politician, deputy and political Secretary of Podemos
- Nigel Farage, Britain politician, MEP and leader of the UKIP
- Alberto Garzón, Spanish politician and deputy of Izquierda Unida
- Marine Le Pen, French politician, MEP and leader of the Front National
- Paloma Lopez, Spanish politician and MEP for Izquierda Unida
- Dimitrios Papadimoulis, Greek politician and MEP for SYRIZA
- Lola Sanchez, Spanish politician and MEP for Podemos

=== Notable individuals ===
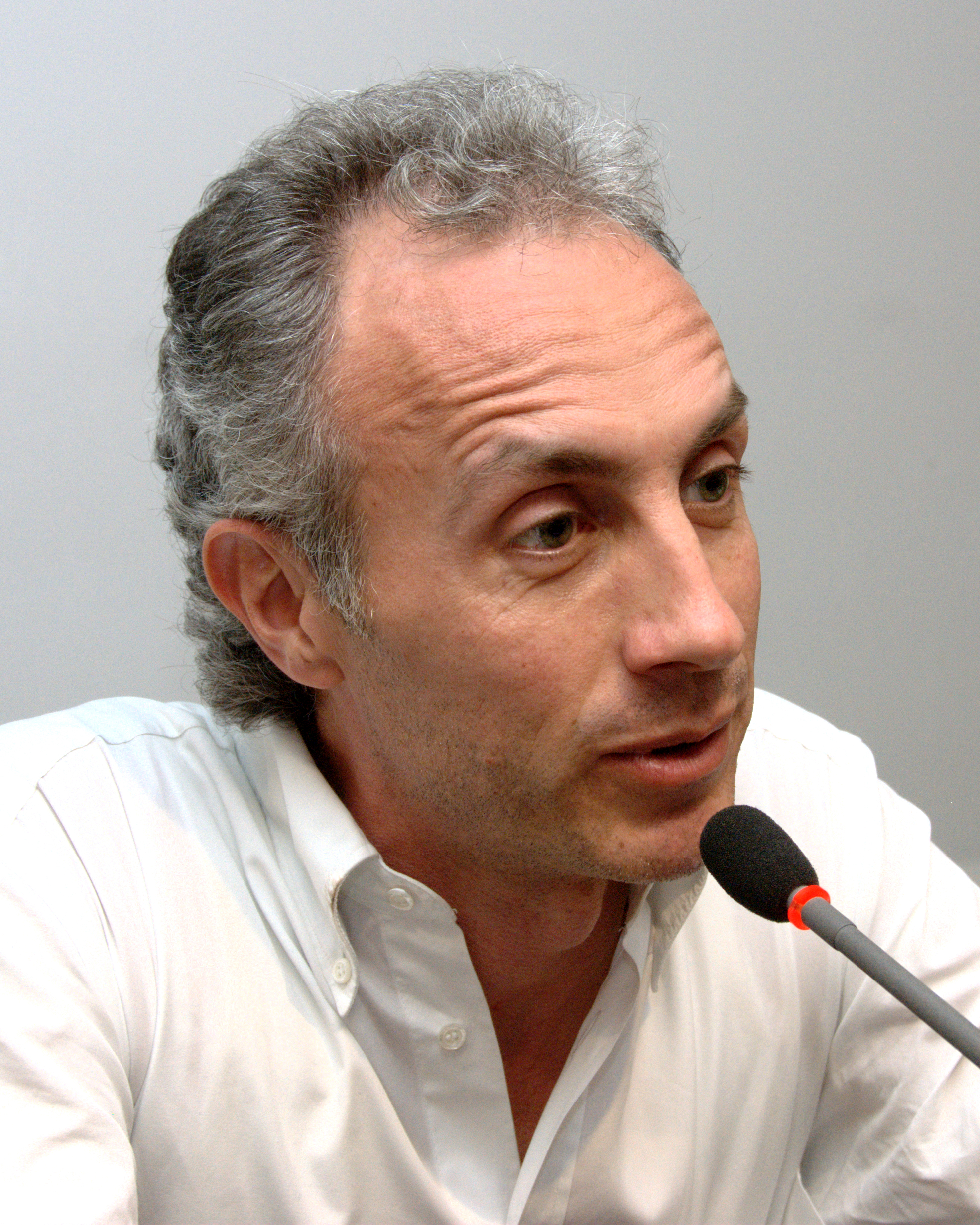
Marco Travaglio

==== Journalists, commentators, and political satirists ====
- Maurizio Crozza, political satirist
- Sabina Guzzanti, political satirist
- Marco Travaglio, journalist

==== University and academic figures ====
- Luciano Canfora, philologist
- Paul Ginsborg, historian
- Piergiorgio Odifreddi, mathematician and essayist
- Gianni Vattimo, philosopher

==== Constitutional judges and lawyer ====
- Stefano Rodotà, judge
- Gustavo Zagrebelsky, judge and former President of the Constitutional Court of Italy

==== Constitutionalists letter ====
On 22 April, 56 constitutionalists and judges published a letter to criticize the reform. Signed the letter:

- Francesco Amirante
- Vittorio Angiolini
- Luca Antonini
- Antonio Baldassarre
- Sergio Bartole
- Ernesto Bettinelli
- Franco Bile
- Paolo Caretti
- Lorenza Carlassare
- Francesco Paolo Casavola
- Enzo Cheli
- Riccardo Chieppa
- Cecilia Corsi
- Antonio D'Andrea
- Ugo De Siervo
- Mario Dogliani
- Giovanni Maria Flick
- Franco Gallo
- Silvio Gambino
- Mario Gorlani
- Stefano Grassi
- Enrico Grosso
- Riccardo Guastini
- Giovanni Guiglia
- Fulco Lanchester
- Sergio Lariccia
- Donatella Loprieno
- Joerg Luther
- Paolo Maddalena
- Maurizio Malo
- Andrea Manzella
- Anna Marzanati
- Luigi Mazzella
- Alessandro Mazzitelli
- Stefano Merlini
- Costantino Murgia
- Guido Neppi Modona
- Walter Nocito
- Valerio Onida
- Saulle Panizza
- Maurizio Pedrazza Gorlero
- Barbara Pezzini
- Alfonso Quaranta
- Saverio Regasto
- Giancarlo Rolla
- Roberto Romboli
- Claudio Rossano
- Fernando Santosuosso
- Giovanni Tarli Barbieri
- Roberto Toniatti
- Romano Vaccarella
- Filippo Vari
- Luigi Ventura
- Maria Paola Viviani Schlein
- Roberto Zaccaria
- Gustavo Zagrebelsky

==== Other ====
- Fernando Aiuti, immunologist
- Carlo Freccero, former director of Rai 2 and Italia 1
- Salvatore Settis, archaeologist
- Nicola Tranfaglia, historian

=== Celebrities ===
==== Actors and film directors ====
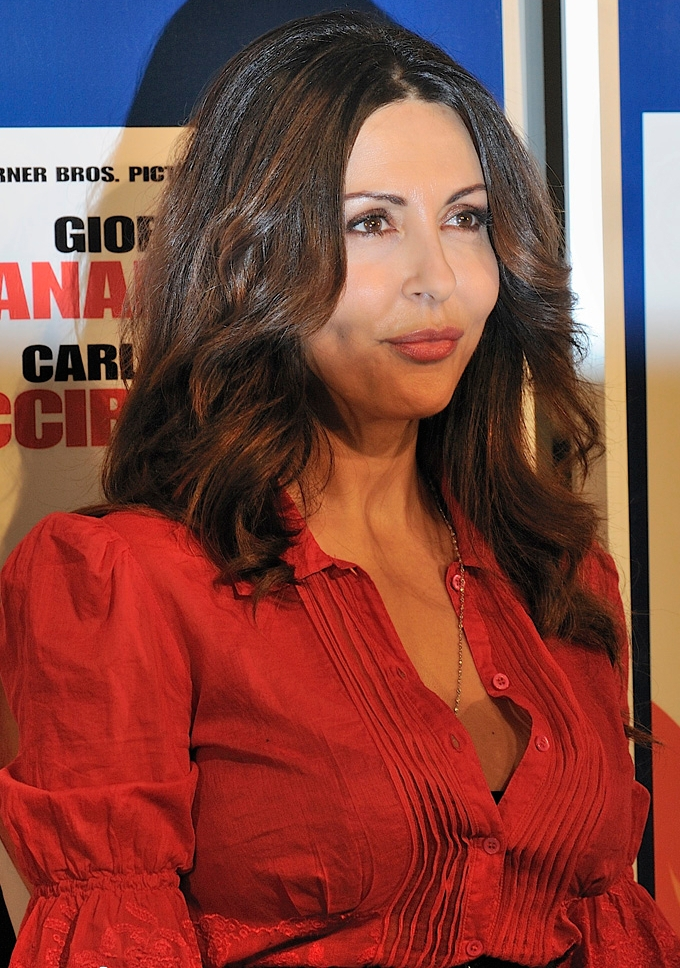
Sabrina Ferilli

- Rossella Brescia, anchorwoman
- Rosita Celentano, actress and anchorwoman
- Roberto Faenza, film director
- Sabrina Ferilli, actress
- Ficarra e Picone, actors and comedian duo
- Elio Germano, actor
- Claudio Gioè, actor
- Monica Guerritore, actress
- Leo Gullotta, actor
- Citto Maselli, film director
- Giuliano Montaldo, film director and actor
- Moni Ovadia, actor
- Alba Parietti, actress and anchorwoman
- Daniela Poggi, actress and anchorwoman
- Ottavia Piccolo, actress
- Claudio Santamaria, film director
- Toni Servillo, actor

==== Singers and producers ====
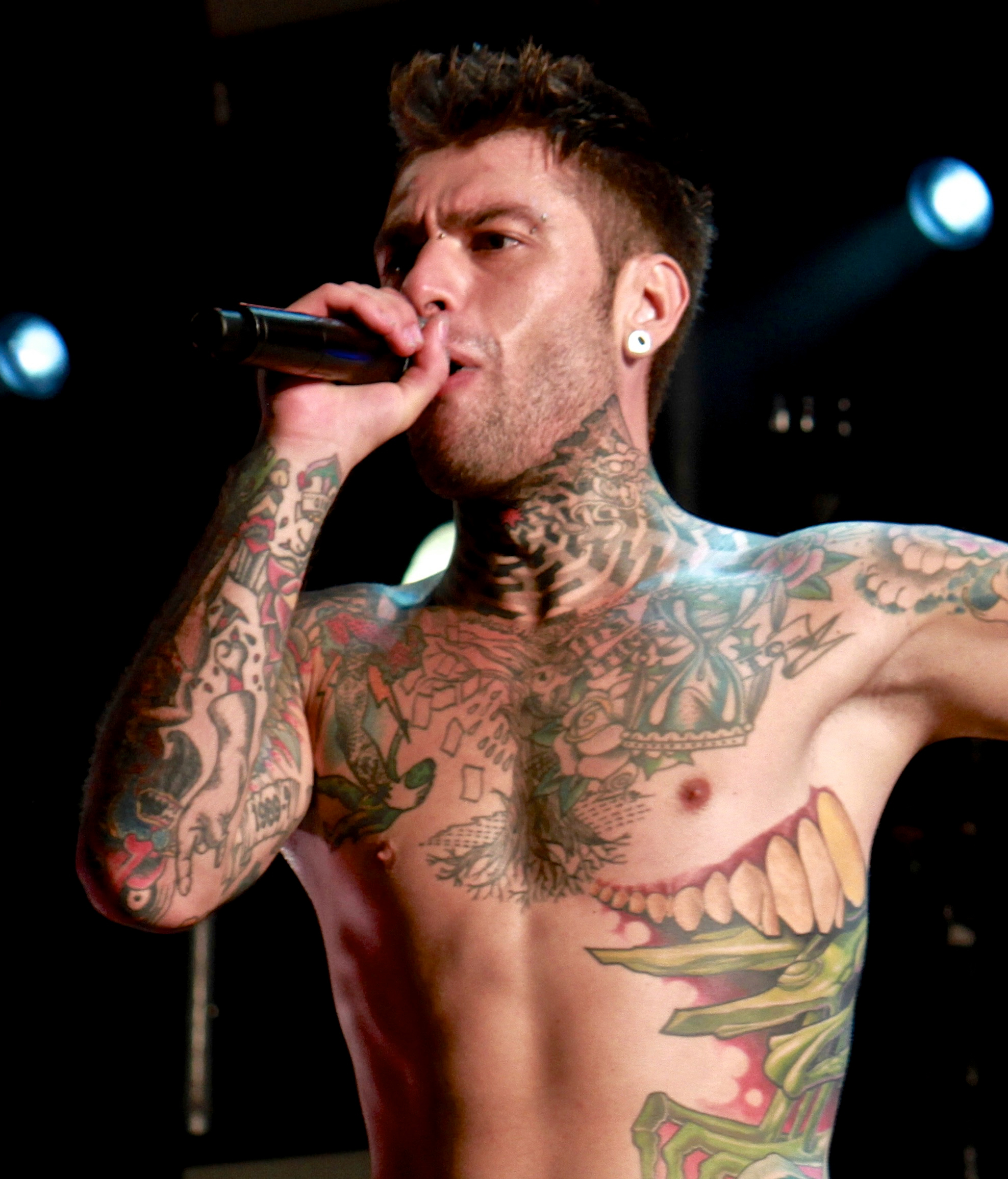
Fedez

- Fedez, singer
- Fiorella Mannoia, singer
- Giorgia, singer
- J-Ax, singer
- Anna Oxa, singer
- Paolo Rossi, singer and actor
- Piero Pelù, singer

==== Writers and artists ====
- Andrea Camilleri, writer
- Erri De Luca, writer
- Rosetta Loy, writer

=== Organisations ===
==== Committees ====
Logo	Campaign	Slogan	Website
	Committee for No	Comitato per il No	www.comitatoperilno.it
	I Vote No	Io Voto No	www.iovotono.it
	Presidenzialists for the No to the Constitution scam	Presidenzialisti per il No alla Costituzione truffa	

==== Main political parties ====
Parties	Political orientation	Leaders	Ref
Five Star Movement (M5S)	Populism	Beppe Grillo	
Forza Italia (FI)	Liberal conservatism	Silvio Berlusconi	
Italian Left (SI)	Democratic socialism	Nicola Fratoianni	
Lega Nord (LN)	Regionalism	Matteo Salvini	
Brothers of Italy (FdI)	National conservatism	Giorgia Meloni	
Union of the Centre (UdC)	Christian democracy	Lorenzo Cesa	
Conservatives and Reformists (CoR)	Conservatism	Raffaele Fitto	
Possible (Pos)	Progressivism	Giuseppe Civati	
Federation of the Greens (FdV)	Green politics	Giobbe Covatta	
Communist Refoundation Party (PRC)	Communism	Paolo Ferrero	
Us with Salvini (NcS)	Regionalism	Matteo Salvini	
Left Ecology Freedom (SEL)	Democratic socialism	Nichi Vendola	

==== Minor parties ====
Parties	Political orientation	Leaders	Ref
South Tyrolean Freedom (STF)	National conservatism	Eva Klotz	
Die Freiheitlichen (dF)	Right-wing populism	Pius Leitner	
Italian Communist Party (PCI)	Communism	Mauro Alboresi	
CasaPound Italy (CPI)	Neo-fascism	Gianluca Iannone	
New Force (FN)	Ultranationalism	Roberto Fiore	
Fascism and Freedom Movement (MFL–PSN)	Neo-fascism	Carlo Gariglio	
National Front (FN)	Anti-globalization	Adriano Tilgher	
Workers' Communist Party (PCL)	Communism	Marco Ferrando	
Tricolour Flame (FT)	Neo-fascism	Attilio Carelli	
Social Idea Movement (MIS)	Neo-fascism	Raffaele Bruno	
Citizens' Union for South Tyrol (BUfS)	National conservatism	Andreas Pöder	
Liga Veneta Repubblica (LVR)	Regionalism	Fabrizio Comencini	
Autonomy Liberty Participation Ecology (ALPE)	Regionalism	Alexis Vallet	
Pro Lombardy Independence	Separatism	Giovanni Roversi	
The Other South	Regionalism	several	
Slovene Union (SSk)	Regionalism	Rafko Dolhar	
Free Trieste	Regionalism	several	
Sardinian Action Party (PSd'Az)	Separatism	Giovanni Columbu	
Greens	Green politics	Brigitte Foppa	
Trentino Project (PT)	Christian democracy	Marino Simoni	
The Other Trento to the Left	Democratic socialism	several	
Trentino Civic List (CT)	Christian democracy	Rodolfo Borga	
Party of the Sicilian People	Regionalism	several	
Progressive Valdostan Union (UVP)	Progressivism	Luigi Bertschy	
Alto Adige in the Heart (ACC)	Liberal conservatism	Alessandro Urzì	
Red Moors (RM)	Separatism	Gesuino Muledda	
Free Sardinia (SL)	Social democracy	several	
Christian Popular Union (UPC)	Christian democracy	Antonio Satta	
Party of the South (PdS)	Regionalism	Natale Cuccurese	
Humanist Party (PU)	Humanism	several	
The People of the Family (PdF)	Social conservatism	Mario Adinolfi	
Veneto First (PiV)	Separatism	Corrado Callegari	
Fassa Association (Fassa)	Christian democracy	Elena Testor	
Alternative for Italy (ApI)	Euroscepticism	Paola De Pin	
Monarchist Alliance (AM)	Monarchism	Franco Ceccarelli	
Unique Italy (IU)^{[A]}	Liberal conservatism	Corrado Passera	
Magna Carta (FMC)	Liberalism	Gaetano Quagliariello	
The Right (La Destra)	National conservatism	Francesco Storace	
Italian Monarchist Union (UMI)	Monarchism	Alessandro Sacchi	
National Action (AN)	National conservatism	Pasquale Viespoli	
We Independent Veneto (NVI)	Separatism	several	
Social Right (DS)	Neo-fascism	Luca Romagnoli	
Sicily Nation (SN)	Separatism	Gaetano Armao	
Democrazia Autonomia (DemA)	Libertarian socialism	Luigi de Magistris	
Communist Party (PC)	Communism	Marco Rizzo	
Italian Marxist–Leninist Party (PMLI)	Communism	Giovanni Scuderi	
FreeRight (LD)	Liberal conservatism	Gianfranco Fini	
Apulia First of All (PPT)	Regionalism	Raffaele Fitto	
Domà Nunch	Eco-nationalism	Lorenzo Banfi	
New Italian Socialist Party (NPSI)	Social democracy	Stefano Caldoro	
Alliance of the Centre (AdC)	Christian democracy	Francesco Pionati	
Italian Democratic Socialist Party (PSDI)	Social democracy	Renato D'Andria	
Southern Action League (LAM)	Regionalism	Giancarlo Cito	
The People of Life	Familialism	Antonio Buonfiglio	
Friuli Movement (MF)	Autonomism	Marco de Agostini	
Pact for Autonomy (PpA)	Autonomism	Sergio Cecotti	
United Right	National conservatism	Massimiliano Panero	
Democratic Union for Consumers (UDpC)	Consumer protection	Bruno De Vita	
Young Aosta Valley (JVdA)	Regionalism		
Italian Reformists	Craxism	Stefania Craxi	
Social Democratic Rebirth	Social democracy	Vittorino Navarra	

==== European political parties ====
Parties	Political orientation	Leaders	Ref
Democracy in Europe Movement 2025 (DiEM 25)	Alter-Europeanism	Yanis Varoufakis	

==== Trade unions and business organisations ====
Organisations	Political and cultural orientation	Secretaries
Italian General Confederation of Labour (CGIL)	Democratic socialism	Susanna Camusso
General Labour Union (UGL)	National syndicalism	Giovanni Centrella
Unione Sindacale di Base (USB)	Communism	several

==== Newspapers ====
Newspapers	Political and cultural orientation
Il Fatto Quotidiano	Legalitarian
Il Giornale	Conservatism
Libero	Right-wing populism
La Verità	National conservatism
Il manifesto	Communism
La Notizia	Populism
HuffPost	Social democracy

==== Periodicals ====
Periodical	Political and cultural orientation
Critica Liberale	Liberalism
MicroMega	Progressivism
Left	Democratic socialism

==== Other organisations ====
Organisations	Political and cultural orientation	Leaders
National Association of the Italian Partisans (ANPI)	Anti-fascism	Carlo Smuraglia
Italian Ricreative and Cultural Association (ARCI)	Non-profit association	Francesca Chiavacci
Freedom and Justice	Non-profit association	Stefano Rodotà, Tomaso Montanari

== Boycott (No) ==
=== Minor parties ===
Parties	Political orientation	Leaders	Ref
Sardinia Nation (SN)	Democratic socialism	Bustianu Cumpostu	
Internationalist Communist Party (ICP)	Left communism	several	
Lega Sud Ausonia (LSA)	Regionalism	Gianfranco Vestuto	

== Neutral ==
=== Minor parties ===
Parties	Political orientation	Leaders	Ref
Unitalia	Italian nationalism	Donato Seppi	

== Notes ==
^{A} The IU dissolved before the election.
