= Raffaele Guariglia =

Italian diplomat (1889–1970)

Baron di Vituso Raffaele Guariglia
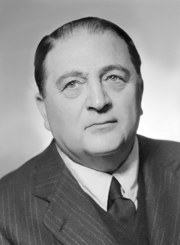

Minister of Foreign Affairs
- In office 25 July 1943 – 11 February 1944
- Prime Minister: Pietro Badoglio
- Preceded by: Benito Mussolini
- Succeeded by: Pietro Badoglio

Member of the Senate of the Republic
- In office 8 May 1948 – 24 June 1953
- Constituency: Salerno

Italian Ambassador to Spain
- In office 1932–1935
- Prime Minister: Benito Mussolini
- Preceded by: Ercole Durini di Monza
- Succeeded by: Orazio Pedrazzi

Personal details
- Born: February 19, 1889 Naples, Italy
- Died: 25 April 1970 (aged 81) Rome, Italy
- Party: Italian Monarchist Union
- Other political affiliations: Independent
- Education: University of Naples

Raffaele Guariglia, Baron di Vituso (19 February 1889 – 25 April 1970) was an Italian diplomat. He is best known for his brief service as Minister of Foreign Affairs in the short-lived 1943 World War II-era Italian government headed by Pietro Badoglio.

== Ambassador ==
Born in 1889 as heir to the noble Neapolitan family of di Vituso, Guariglia graduated in law in 1908 at the University of Naples and had the connections necessary to make a career in the Italian Foreign Service, which he joined in 1909.

During his first 23 years in the service, he occupied a series of diplomatic posts of sub-ambassadorial rank, serving in Paris, London, St. Petersburg, Brussels, and other capitals. Meanwhile the Italian government fell under the domination of Benito Mussolini.

Guariglia attained ambassadorial rank in 1932 when he was named Italy's ambassador to Spain. In 1935 he was translated to Buenos Aires and in 1937 to France. In Paris, he achieved close friendship with a person with insider status in the French government, the Countess Hélène de Portes. De Portes had separated from her noble husband and developed a tie as the long-term romantic partner of a rising French politician, Paul Reynaud. In 1938 Reynaud became Minister of Finance. Although Reynaud's own position was that of staunch opposition to Nazi Germany, his partner's growing liaison with Italy, together with Italy's deepening ties to Germany, compromised this opposition. Guariglia's work was complicit in this power shift.

In May–June 1940 Reynaud, who had become Prime Minister of France, was leading his country as it fell under blitzkrieg attack. When Italy declared war on a defeated France on 10 June 1940, Guariglia's services as ambassador were no longer appropriate.

== Foreign minister ==
Guariglia was serving as Italy's ambassador to neutral Turkey in 1943 when Mussolini's government fell. As an Italian patriot who had loyally served the Fascist regime without developing close personal ties to Mussolini, the career diplomat was Badoglio's choice to be the Foreign Minister of what Rome hoped would be a successful neutralist government. Guariglia returned to the Ministry, took on his new responsibilities on 30 July 1943, and almost at once opened indirect negotiations with the Western Allies.

Nazi Germany was not interested in a neutral Italy, and its army actually possessed physical control over most of the peninsula. Furthermore, Guariglia soon found that the Allies were demanding the unconditional surrender of Italy. The result of these counter-pressures was such that six days after the hapless foreign minister and his Cabinet colleagues oversaw the signing of an armistice with the Allies on 3 September, the German army physically occupied the peninsula and carried on the war. On 9 September, the Badoglio government disintegrated. The prime minister and many of the members of his government fled to Allied-occupied Brindisi; Guariglia and other members of the government attempted to remain in Rome, but soon found they were not safe and had no power in a capital city under German occupation. The foreign minister, who had earlier served as ambassador to Spain, found himself taking refuge in the Spanish Embassy in Rome, under the protection of the Francisco Franco government. Guariglia had by now ceased to serve as Foreign Minister de facto, but remained in this post de jure until dismissed on a long-distance basis by the fugitive Badoglio on 11 February 1944.

== Later life ==
Guariglia, an Italian baron and supporter of the House of Savoy, was not eligible to serve in cabinet after the abdication of Umberto II in 1946. He did not lose hope for the restoration of the monarchy, and served as national president of the Italian Monarchist Union and as a monarchist member of the Senate of the Republic from Salerno between 1948 and 1953.

Age 81, he died in Rome in 1970.

== Works ==
- 1941, Versi giovanili, Spadafora.
- 1950, Ricordi: 1922-1946, Edizioni Scientifiche Italiane, Napoli.
- 1955, La diplomatie difficile: mémoires 1922-1946, Librairie Plon, Paris.
- 1972, Primi passi in diplomazia e rapporti dall'ambasciata di Madrid, 1932-1934, Edizioni Scientifiche Italiane, Napoli.
- 1981, Scritti storico-eruditi e documenti diplomatici, 1936-1940, Edizioni Scientifiche Italiane, Napoli.
- 1982, Raffaele Guariglia, Collana Testi diplomatici vol. 9, Ministero degli Affari Esteri - Servizio Storico e Documentazione - Roma (PDF version)

== Honors ==
Grand officer of the Order of Saints Maurice and Lazarus – January 19, 1935

Knight Grand Cross of the Order of the Crown of Italy

== See also ==
- Ministry of Foreign Affairs (Italy)
- Foreign relations of Italy
