= Antonio Tajani =

Italian politician (born 1953)

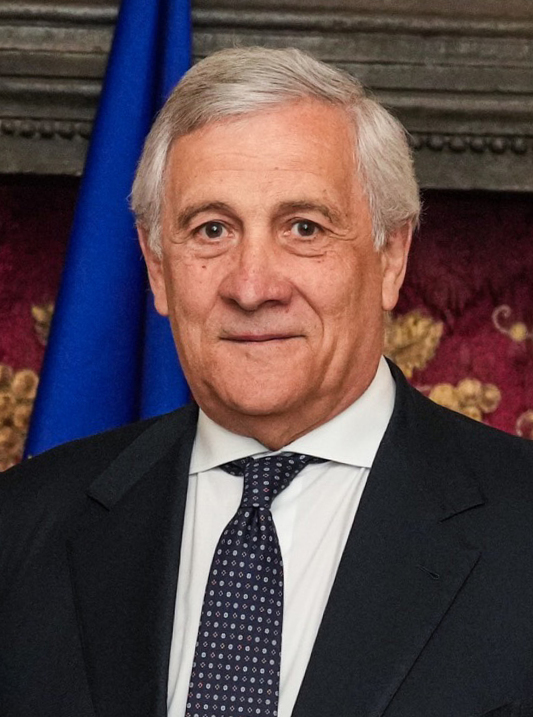
- Tajani in 2025

Deputy Prime Minister of Italy
- Incumbent
- Assumed office 22 October 2022 Serving with Matteo Salvini
- Prime Minister: Giorgia Meloni
- Preceded by: Matteo Salvini (2019); Luigi Di Maio (2019)

Minister of Foreign Affairs
- Incumbent
- Assumed office 22 October 2022
- Prime Minister: Giorgia Meloni
- Preceded by: Luigi Di Maio

Secretary of Forza Italia
- Incumbent
- Assumed office 15 July 2023
- Preceded by: Office established

Member of the Chamber of Deputies
- Incumbent
- Assumed office 13 October 2022
- Constituency: Velletri
European Union offices
President of the European Parliament
In office 17 January 2017 – 3 July 2019
Vice President	Mairead McGuinness
Preceded by	Martin Schulz
Succeeded by	David Sassoli
First Vice-President of the European Parliament
In office 1 July 2014 – 18 January 2017
President	Martin Schulz
Preceded by	Gianni Pittella
Succeeded by	Mairead McGuinness
European Commissioner for Industry and Entrepreneurship
In office 9 February 2010 – 1 July 2014
President	José Manuel Barroso
Preceded by	Günter Verheugen
Succeeded by	Michel Barnier (Acting)
European Commissioner for Transport
In office 9 May 2008 – 9 February 2010
President	José Manuel Barroso
Preceded by	Jacques Barrot
Succeeded by	Siim Kallas
Member of the European Parliament
In office 1 July 2014 – 12 October 2022
Constituency	Central Italy
In office 20 July 1994 – 8 May 2008
Constituency	Central Italy

Personal details
- Born: 4 August 1953 (age 73) Rome, Italy
- Party: FI (since 2013)
- Other political affiliations: UMI (1970s); FI (1994–2009); PdL (2009–2013)
- Spouse: Brunella Orecchio (m. 1989)
- Children: 2
- Education: Sapienza University
- Website: Parliament website

Antonio Tajani (Italian pronunciation: [anˈtɔːnjo taˈjaːni]; born 4 August 1953) is an Italian politician who has been serving as Deputy Prime Minister of Italy and Minister of Foreign Affairs since 22 October 2022. He served as President of the European Parliament from 2017 to 2019, as European Commissioner from 2008 to 2014, and also as a member of the European Parliament from 1994 to 2008 and again from 2014 to 2022, until he was elected to Italy's Chamber of Deputies. Following the death of Silvio Berlusconi, Tajani was appointed secretary of Forza Italia, becoming the party's new leader on 15 July 2023.

== Career ==
=== Early years ===
Born to a mother from Ferentino, in the province of Frosinone, and a father from Vietri sul Mare, in the province of Salerno, Tajani attended the Liceo Torquato Tasso in Rome and graduated in law from the Sapienza University of Rome; he was a reserve officer of the Italian Air Force. After attending the high specialisation course in air defence at Borgo Piave di Latina, he served as an air defence controller at the San Giovanni Teatino radar base. In his youth, Tajani was a militant of Fronte Monarchico Giovanile (Youth Monarchist Front), a student organization of the Italian Monarchist Union (UMI). He has consistently advocated the return from exile of the House of Savoy (which was banned by the Italian Constitution until 2002, when the Italian Parliament lifted the ban).

Tajani was one of the founders of the Forza Italia party in 1994, and then regional coordinator of the party in Lazio from 1994 to 2005. In Berlusconi's first government (1994–95), he was a spokesman for the Prime Minister. In 1996, he ran for parliament in the Alatri constituency, but obtained 45.3% of the votes and was defeated by the representative of the Olive Tree. In 2001, Tajani was a candidate for mayor of Rome for the coalition of the House of Freedom, but was defeated by Walter Veltroni after polling 47.8% of the vote. A professional journalist since 1980, he was a parliamentary reporter, editor of Il Settimanale, presenter on Rai of Gr1, and head of the Roman editorial staff of Il Giornale newspaper under the direction of Indro Montanelli. He was a special envoy to Lebanon, the Soviet Union and Somalia. In addition to Italian, he speaks English, French and Spanish. He is married to Brunella Orecchio and has two children. He is Catholic.

=== European Parliament ===
In 1994, Tajani was elected a Member of the European Parliament (MEP), and reelected in 1999 and 2004. He was chairman of the delegation of Forza Italia to the European Parliament from June 1999 until May 2008. Since 2002 (the year of the Estoril Congress), Tajani has been one of 10 vice-presidents of the European People's Party. He was re-elected at the Rome Congress in 2006 and at the Bonn conference in 2009, and then again at the Bucharest Congress in 2012.

At the 2004 European Parliament election in Italy, Tajani was elected from a list of Forza Italia in the Central college, receiving 122,000 preferences. He was admitted to the European People's Party. Tajani was an MEP for Central Italy with the Forza Italia party from 2004 to 2008 and sat on the European Parliament's Committee on Foreign Affairs. He was a substitute for the Committee on Civil Liberties, Justice and Home Affairs and a member of the Delegation for relations with Israel. He was a member of the European Convention, which drafted the text of the European Constitution that never entered into force. He was a member of the Working Group on the Conference on the Future of Europe.

=== European Commissioner for Transport ===
On 8 May 2008, Tajani was appointed as Italy's EU Commissioner by newly elected Italian Prime Minister Silvio Berlusconi, replacing Franco Frattini, who became the new Italian foreign minister. Tajani received the Commissioner for Transport portfolio. He was officially approved in his post by the European Parliament on 18 June 2008 with a vote of 507 to 53 with 64 abstentions. He also served as Vice-President of the European Commission. In this role, Tajani promoted the rescue plan for Alitalia, through the involvement of private funding in the airline capital. His plan was not successful and Alitalia is remains in terminal administration only supported by illegal state aid.

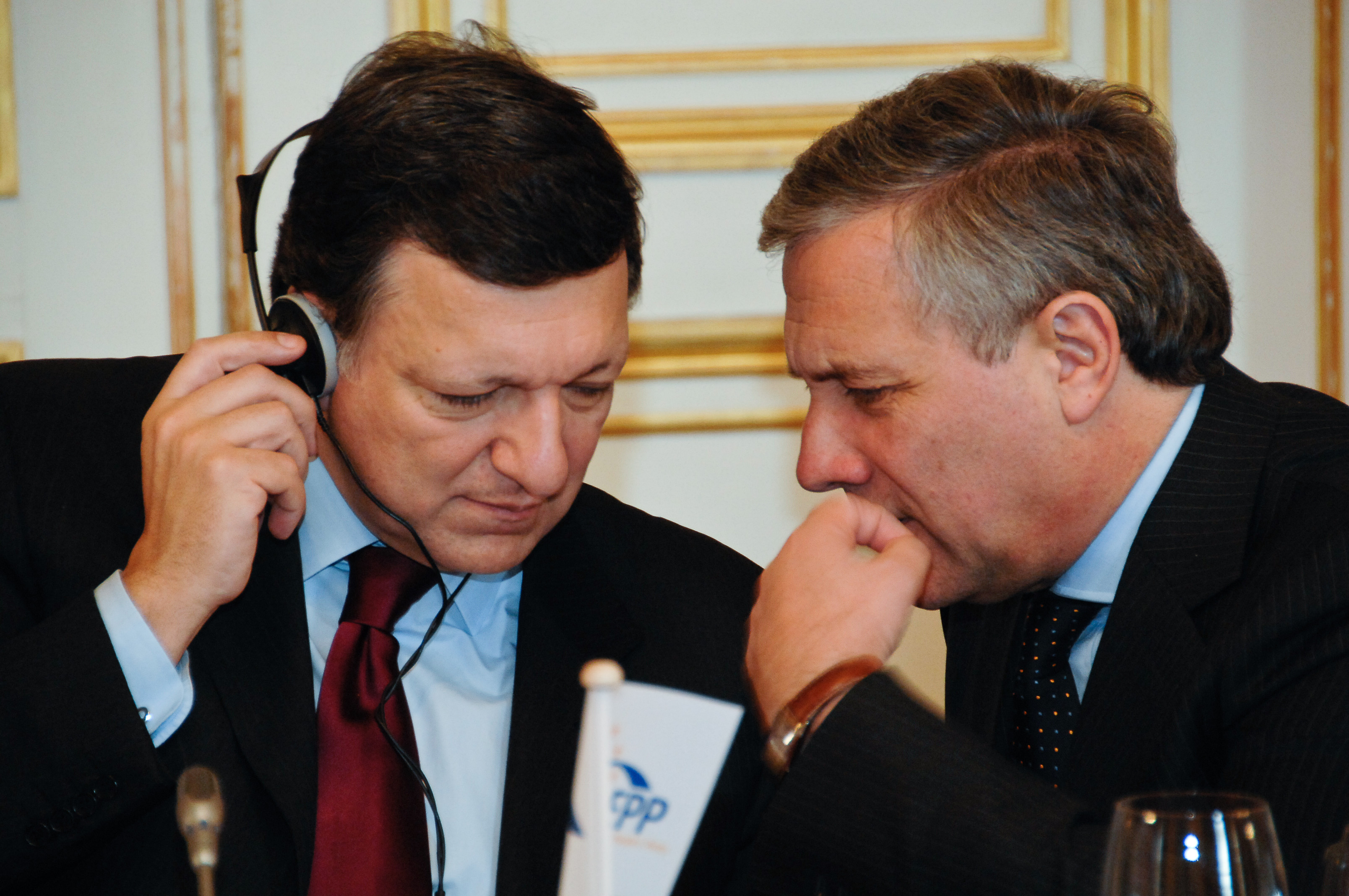
Tajani and European Commission president José Manuel Barroso at the EPP congress in 2008

Tajani oversaw the drafting of new EU Regulation relating to transport, including clarification of the rights of passengers in air transport. The aim was for passengers to receive assistance and reimbursement in case of denied boarding, cancellation or delay of the flight. The proposals were poor, resulting in widespread evasion by the airlines across Europe and abuse by customers. Both parties have called for reform of the legislation to make it fair and workable.

=== European Commissioner for Industry and Entrepreneurship ===
In 2009, Tajani was reappointed as a member of Italian nationality of the second Barroso Commission, as European Commissioner for Industry and Entrepreneurship; he remained one of the four Vice-Presidents of the Commission. The confirmation of Tajani followed the decline of the candidacy of Massimo D'Alema as High Representative for Foreign Policy. For Tajani, an alternative foreshadowed would have been a candidacy as president of the Lazio Region. Michel Barnier was twice Acting Commissioner in his stead, from 19 April 2014 – 25 May 2014 while he was on electoral campaign leave for the 2014 elections to the European Parliament and from 1 July 2014 – 16 July 2014 after he took up his seat.

In October 2012, Tajani launched his campaign for a new industrial revolution in Europe, in order to flip the tendency of the economic crisis, and also to revamp industry. The concrete goals of this initiative, aimed at re-industrialization, are bringing the value of industry to as much as 20% of GDP by 2020, creating new jobs, and promoting sustainable growth. The new Late Payments Directive 2011/7/EU, with the goal of countering payment delays in commercial transactions, was adopted in 2011. Following the adoption, Tajani urged a prompt implementation in all member states, even before the official deadline set for 16 March 2016. In order to further accelerate the process, he launched an information campaign across the 27 member states that takes place between October 2012 and December 2014. In March 2013 Tajani, along with Commissioner Olli Rehn said that the European Commission is ready to acknowledge "mitigating factors" on the assessment of compliance with the deficit and debt criteria, in the context of a plan for the disposal of old debts of the public administration to enterprises.

Tajani in 2012

During 2012, Tajani led the drafting of a proposal to simplify the procedure to register cars in another member state within the European Union. Concretely, the proposal, which should come into force in 2014, aims at reducing to a minimum the administrative procedures necessary to register cars, vans, trucks and buses in another member state. Furthermore, it would be impossible to register in another country a stolen vehicle, thanks to the enhanced cooperation of the competent authorities at the European level. In order to support the European fight against counterfeiting of industrial goods, in December 2012, Vice President Tajani launched an awareness campaign for the citizens. Moreover, in February 2013 the European Commission further reinforced market surveillance through a plan to reinforce the controls of the products in the internal market. In particular, the "Made in" is part of the discussion on counterfeiting, especially for the textile sector in Italy. The package presented by Tajani and Tonio Borg, European Commissioner for Health and Consumer Policy introduces among other things the denomination 'Made In' for products manufactured in and outside the EU, so as to better supervise what enters into the European market.

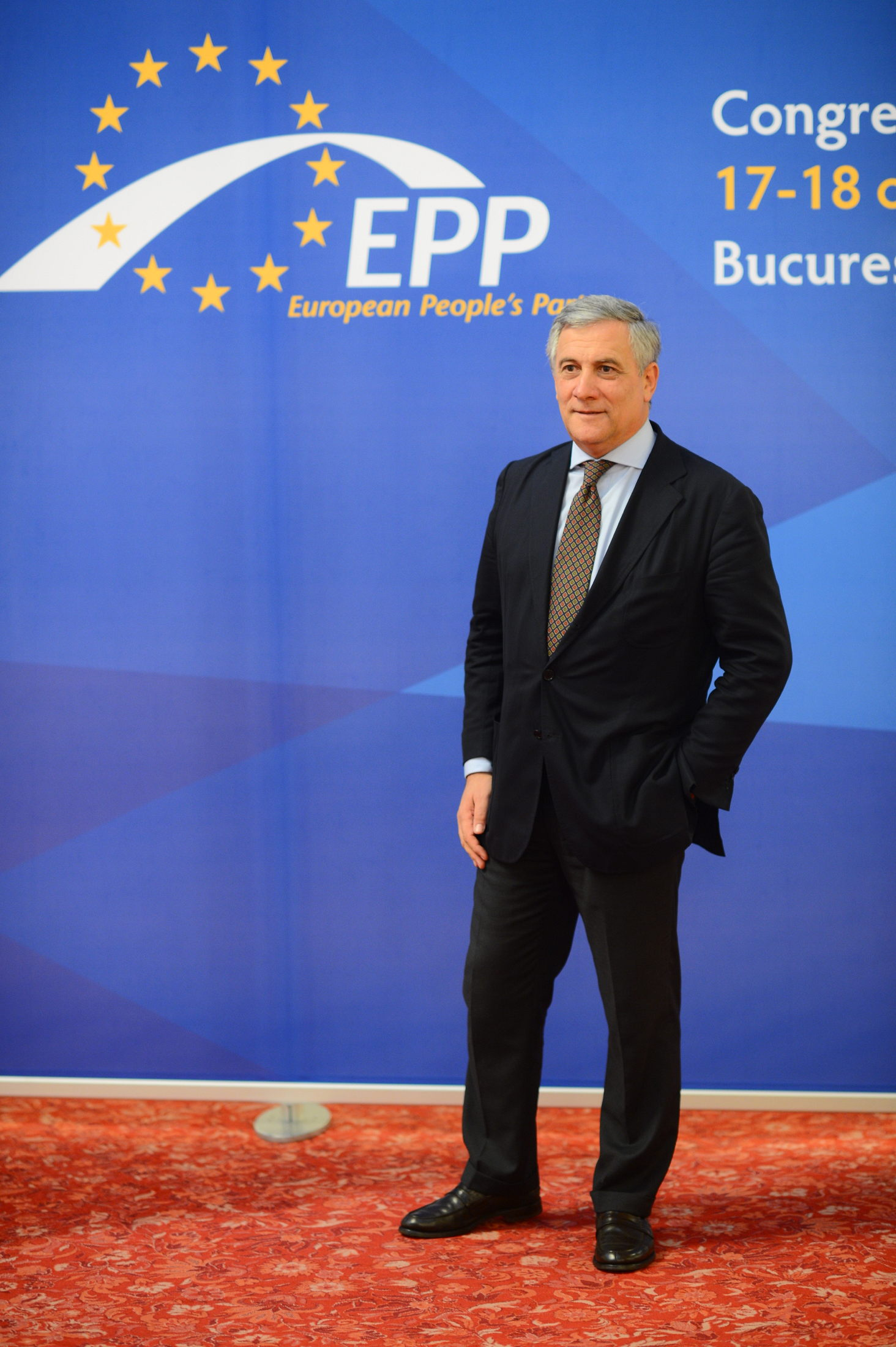
Tajani at the EPP congress in 2012

With the goal of promoting competitiveness, alongside sustainable development of the European automobile industry, Tajani presented a plan in November 2012, called the Action Plan CARS2020. The plan focuses on a transition towards more energy efficiency and alternative energy sources, as well as technologies and advanced materials for the production. Among the actions that Tajani undertook to foster growth and regain higher levels of employment, it is worth mentioning an Action Plan, aimed at supporting entrepreneurs, through specific measures to facilitate business transfers, increase access to finance, and give a second chance following a bankruptcy.

Another of Tajani's initiatives was a project called "50,000 Tourists", launched on 1 June 2011, which focussed on promoting low-season tourism between Europe and South America, encouraging cooperation between European governments, the tourism industry, and airline companies. The initiatives connected to tourism include a Travelers Decalogue in August 2012, a series of rules to travel in full safety. Additionally, in November 2012 Tajani presented, in collaboration with the European Commissioner for Internal Affairs Cecilia Malmström, a Communication to examine how the implementation and development of a common policy in terms of visas could support the EU growth by providing more chances for foreign travelers to visit the Union.

In March 2013 the President of the European Commission José Manuel Barroso has appointed Tajani to lead the new EU-Brazil working group, which will also include the European Commissioner for Trade Karel De Gucht and European Commissioner for Research, Innovation and Science Máire Geoghegan-Quinn. The group will be in charge of evaluating the opportunities for industrial cooperation between the EU and Brazil, particularly in the most technological sectors. On 11 June 2013 Tajani presented the first Action Plan for the Steel Industry since 1977 to help this sector face today's challenges and lay the foundations for future competitiveness by fostering innovation, creating growth and jobs. The Commission proposed to support the demand for European steel both at home and abroad, by acting to ensure that European steel producers have access to third countries in a fair trade market.

=== President of the European Parliament ===
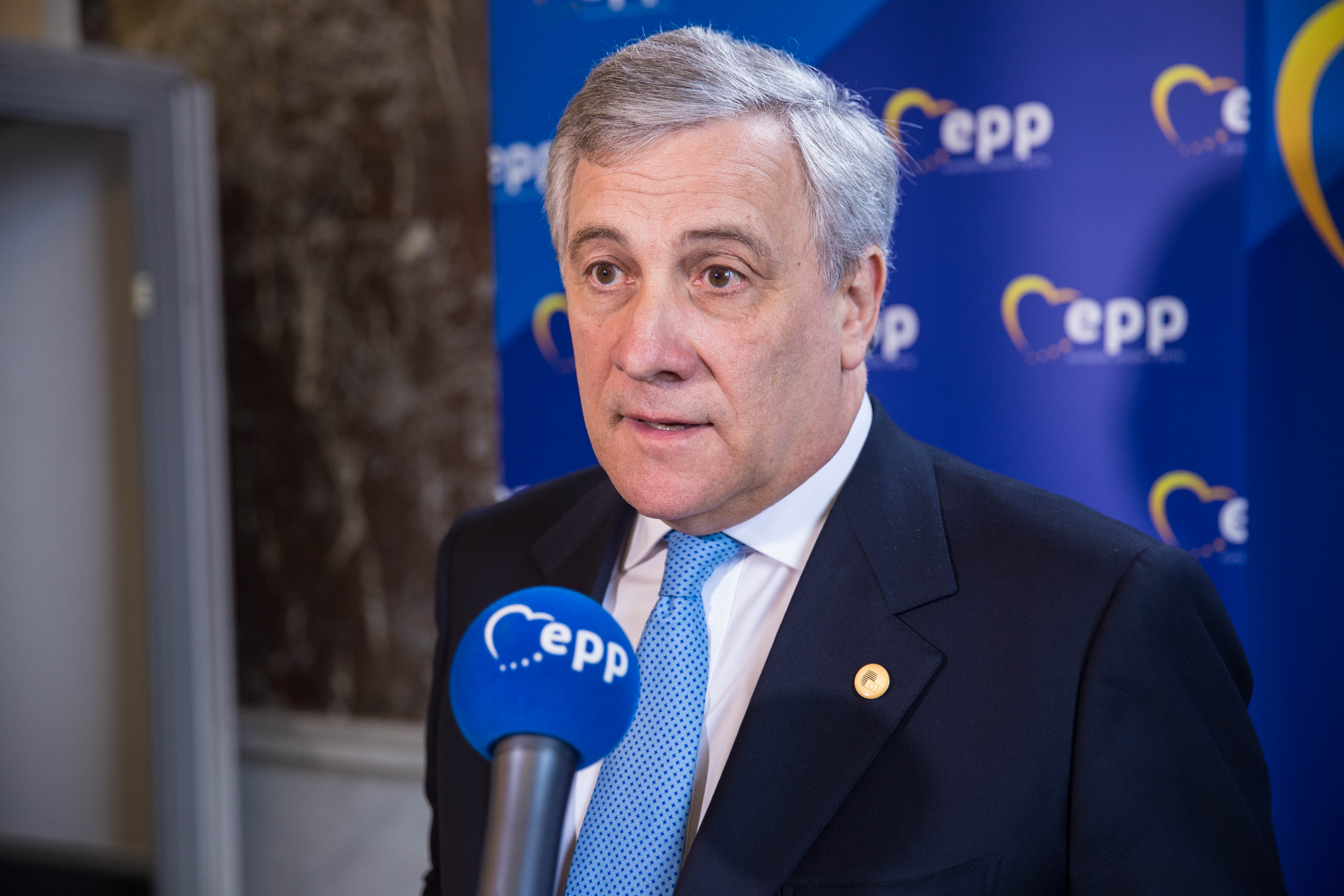
Tajani in March 2017

At the end of Martin Schulz's term, the presidency for the remainder of the eighth European Parliament (2014–2019) would have been due by convention to pass to an EPP member; however, the EPP–S&D agreement appeared broken, making it less certain that Tajani, who was selected as EPP candidate, would be elected president. The other contenders were the social-democrat Gianni Pittella, the liberal Guy Verhofstadt, the conservative Helga Stevens, the leftist Eleonora Forenza, and the green Jean Lambert. On 17 January 2017, Tajani was elected after four rounds of voting, following the withdrawal of Verhofstadt and declaration of support for the EPP candidate by the ALDE; he was first Italian to hold the office since the Christian democrat Emilio Colombo (1977–1979).

In March 2017, Tajani warned that "Africa is now risking becoming a Chinese colony" as he argued the Chinese want only the raw materials but are not interested in stability. In February 2018, Silvio Berlusconi indicated Tajani as his candidate for the premiership if the centre-right coalition would win the 2018 Italian general election. Tajani accepted the candidacy on 1 March. In January 2019, Tajani expressed hope to be re-elected for a second 2.5-year term, but he was replaced by another Italian, David Sassoli of the Democratic Party.

=== Minister of Foreign Affairs and leader of Forza Italia ===
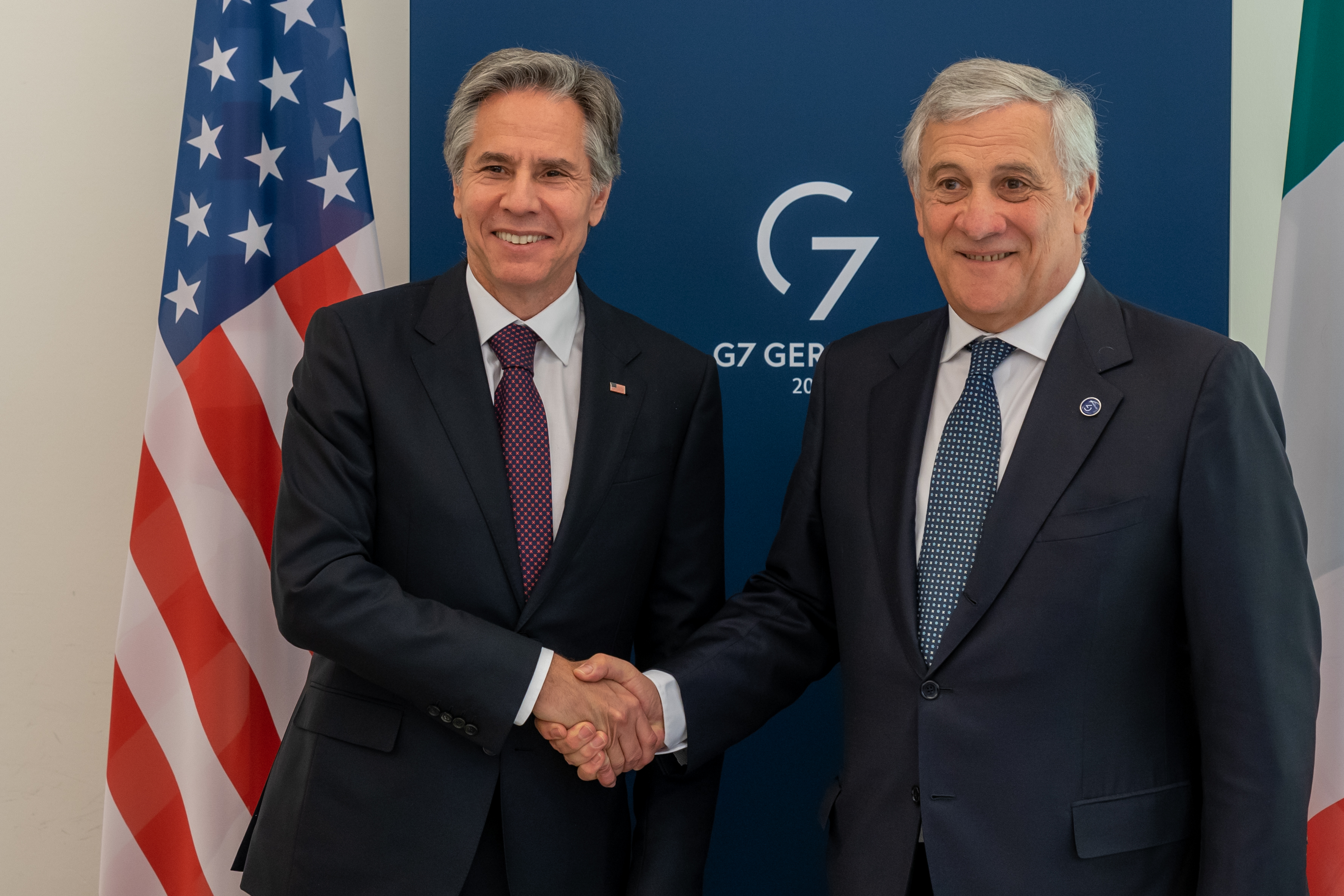
Tajani with US Secretary of State Antony J. Blinken in Münster in November 2022

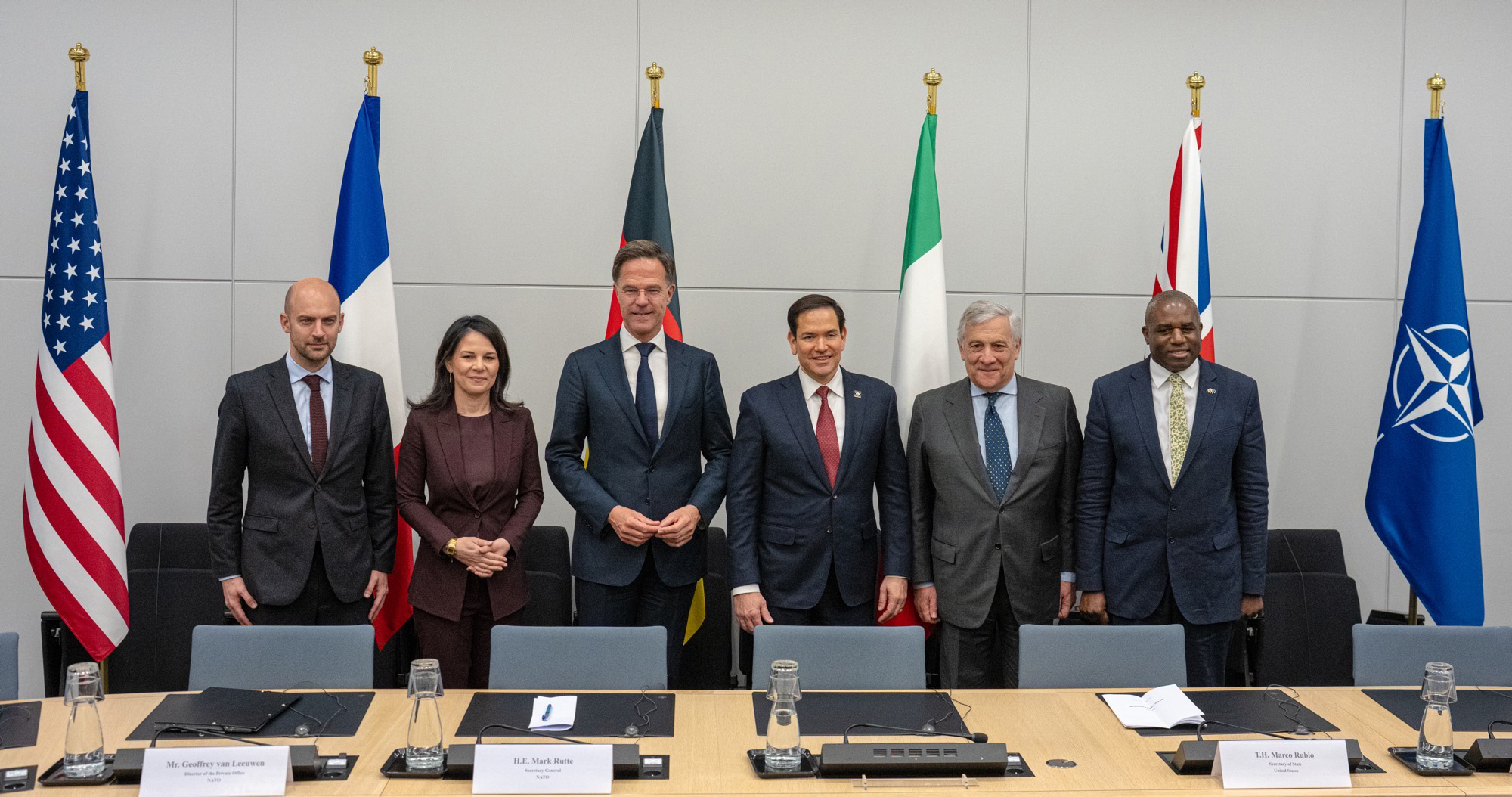
Tajani with NATO Secretary General Mark Rutte in Brussels in April 2025

Following the 2022 Italian general election, won by the centre-right coalition, Giorgia Meloni, the leader of Brothers of Italy party, was sworn in as Italy's first female prime minister on 22 October 2022. Tajani became deputy prime minister in her government. The new government, Italy's most right-wing since World War II, included also right-wing party of Matteo Salvini, the League. Tajani was also appointed as minister of foreign affairs. On 12 June 2023, Berlusconi died.

A few days after Berlusconi's death, the party announced that a national council would be summoned before the end of summer in order to appoint an acting president and determine the road map toward the national congress that would elect the new party's leadership. In July, the party's national council amended the party's statute by removing the post of president, which would be forever associated with Berlusconi (including in the party's symbol), and introducing the post of secretary. Contextually, Tajani was unanimously elected secretary, becoming the party's new leader.

In an interview on 11 January 2024, Tajani said that while Israel had hit civilians in its war against Hamas in Gaza, it had not committed genocide. Tajani argued that the ICC arrest warrant for Israeli Prime Minister Benjamin Netanyahu could not be applied at least until the end of Netanyahu's term, and then repeated on various occasions that Italy would not arrest Netanyahu. During a Chamber of Deputies session on 28 May 2025, Tajani shifted his stance, describing Israel’s military response as "dramatic and unacceptable" and calling for an immediate halt to operations in Gaza. He also condemned the forced expulsion of Palestinians from Gaza, stating it was "not and will never be an acceptable solution". Further expressing Italy’s willingness to join a peacekeeping mission under Arab leadership, stressing the importance of respecting international humanitarian law and resuming humanitarian aid.

== Political positions ==
Tajani advocates for liberal economic policies, criticizing the minimum wage, taxes on banks' windfall profits, and the requirement to appoint ministerial auditors for companies receiving state subsidies, likening these measures to the USSR.

While supporting civil unions, Tajani reiterated that the family consists of "father, mother, and children", and stated his opposition to surrogacy for both same-sex and heterosexual couples.

Regarding citizenship, Tajani opposes jus soli, advocates for restrictions on jus sanguinis laws, and supports a "jus scholae", which would allow people who have attended school in Italy for ten years to obtain citizenship.

While Tajani supports a federal Europe and opposes the right of veto held by states, he has also specified that he does not identify with Altiero Spinelli's vision of Europe.

Although Tajani stated in 2024 that Italy "is opposed to any proposal for a Palestinian state" because "it does not exist", in 2025 he affirmed that he was in favor of recognizing the Palestinian state, but that it does not exist yet.

Tajani also supports the existence of a gateway drug effect that links cannabis to future hard drug use, and oppose euthanasia.

== Controversies ==
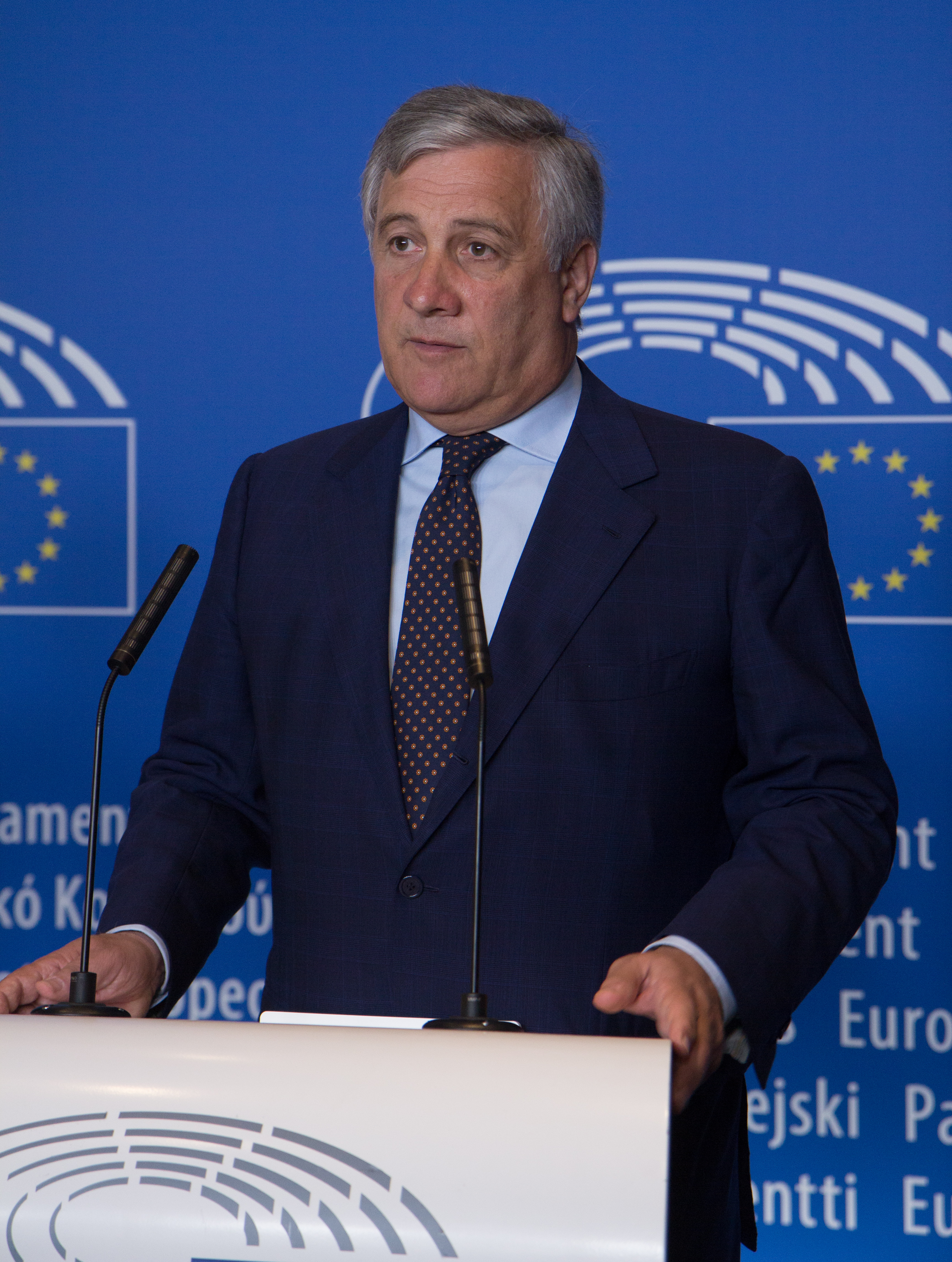
Tajani speaking at a meeting of the European Parliament

In a letter dated 12 February 2013, the environment commissioner Janez Potočnik warned Tajani about "widespread concerns that [car] performance has been tailored tightly to compliance with the test cycle in disregard of the dramatic increase in emissions outside that narrow scope". Tajani declined to take action or report on Potočnik's concerns, until the Volkswagen emissions scandal confirmed the commissioner's concerns in 2015. At the subsequent EMIS hearing on the subject, Tajani said that he was not informed of the issue at the time.

In the eve of his election as President of the European Parliament, the LGBTQ rights group ILGA-Europe expressed its disappointment with Tajani's new political post and his political backing from the European People's Party (EPP) and Alliance of Liberals and Democrats for Europe (ALDE). ILGA stated that Tajani's concerns, expressed in 1996, with the psychological well-being of same-sex couples and his stance, expressed in 2014, against non heteronormative families are not in line with the stances of the ALDE and the EPP on non-discrimination based on sexual orientation.

In October 2018, Tajani told Rai News in an interview that the Italian government's plan for the citizens' income is "not going in the right direction", adding that it "will end up in the pockets of Roma, of foreign citizens – from the EU and non-EU – and certainly not in those of many Italian citizens". The European Roma Rights Centre criticized Tajani over his anti-Roma comments.

In February 2019, Tajani held a speech at the National Memorial Day of the Exiles and Foibe commemoration in Basovizza, near Trieste, which aroused an outrage in Slovenia and Croatia, most notably the statement "Long live Trieste, long live Italian Istria, long live Italian Dalmatia". After numerous high representatives of the two countries strongly condemned the speech for its revisionist and irredentist connotations, Tajani stated his words were intended as "a message of peace", and were misinterpreted. The Slovenian party Social Democrats launched a petition demanding Tajani's immediate resignation as president of the EU Parliament, which was signed among others by several former presidents of Slovenia and Croatia.

In a March 2019 radio interview on La Zanzara, a radio show on Italian network Radio 24, Tajani discussed "the good things Mussolini did", citing the land reclamation and the construction of infrastructure, which was criticized. In a later tweet, he wrote about manipulation of his words.

== Recognitions ==
- 2 April 2014 - Aragon Empresa Award received by His Royal Highness Felipe the Prince of Asturias for his efforts in favour of industry and entrepreneurship
- 10 February 2014 - Innovadores Award received by El Mundo in recognition of his support for the industry, entrepreneurship and innovation
- 17 April 2012 – Honours for the commitment to SMEs and EU integration, Spanish Royal Institute of European Studies.
- 28 March 2012 – Prize established by the Optical Society of America for his commitment to the promotion of Key Enabling Technologies. The Prize is awarded yearly to public leaders who have distinguished themselves for their activities in the field.
- 19 March 2012 – Europe Prize 2011 by the Initiative Group of the Italians in Brussels (GII) for his strong commitment for the business community - in particular SMEs - and the promotion of the image of Italy in Europe.
- 21 November 2011 – International Journalism Prize "Argil: European man" in the category: "Communicating Europe". Award sponsored by the journalists press office (GUS), by UGEF (Unione Giornalisti Europei per il Federalismo secondo Altiero Spinelli) and by 'ANGPI (Associazione Nazionale Giornalisti Pubblicisti Italiani), as well as' the Union of Roman Chroniclers and with the support and contribution of the Regional Council of Lazio, agencies and public institutions.

== Public image ==
In April 2015, the city of Gijón, in the Principality of Asturias (Spain) dedicated a street to Tajani in recognition of his work done during his mandate as Vice President of the European Commission, responsible for Industry and Entrepreneurship. The naming of the street was proposed by the workers of the American company Tenneco together with the federation of Asturian businesses, and approved unanimously by all political forces in the City Council of Gijón, for the mediation carried out by Tajani in September 2013 in the negotiations with Tenneco, which had decided to close the plant in Asturias; if followed through, it would have resulted in the dismissal of 210 employees. After a long and difficult negotiation with the leaders of the company and social partners, Tajani was able to obtain the reopening of the plant in April 2014, preserving the jobs of two-thirds of the workers.

== Electoral history ==
Election	House	Constituency	Party	Votes	Result
1994	European Parliament	Central Italy	FI	50,991	Elected
1999	European Parliament	Central Italy	FI	55,240	Elected
2004	European Parliament	Central Italy	FI	123,201	Elected
2014	European Parliament	Central Italy	FI	109,720	Elected
2019	European Parliament	Central Italy	FI	69,026	Elected
2022	Chamber of Deputies	Lazio 1 – Velletri	FI	105,628	Elected

== Honours ==
- France: Officer of the Legion of Honour
- Japan: Grand Cordon of the Order of the Rising Sun
- Norway: Grand Cross of the Royal Norwegian Order of Merit (2023)
- Spain: Grand Cross of the Order of Civil Merit (2013)
- Spain: Grand Cross of the Order of Isabella the Catholic (2024)

Political offices
Preceded by Franco Frattini	Italian European Commissioner; 2008–2014	Succeeded by Fernando Nelli Feroci
Preceded by Jacques Barrot	European Commissioner for Transport; 2008–2010	Succeeded by Siim Kallas
Preceded by Günter Verheugen as European Commissioner for Enterprise and Industry	European Commissioner for Industry and Entrepreneurship; 2010–2014	Succeeded by Michel Barnier; Acting
Preceded by Martin Schulz	President of the European Parliament; 2017–2019	Succeeded by David Sassoli
Preceded by Matteo Salvini; Luigi Di Maio	Deputy Prime Minister of Italy; 2022–present Served alongside: Matteo Salvini	Incumbent
Preceded by Luigi Di Maio	Minister of Foreign Affairs; 2022–present	Incumbent
Party political offices
New title	Vice President of the European People's Party; 2019–present	Incumbent
New title	Secretary of Forza Italia; 2023–present	Incumbent
Academic offices
Preceded by António Costa	Invocation Speaker of the College of Europe; 2018	Succeeded by Donald Tusk
