= Gaetano Pedullà =

Italian politician (born 1967)

Gaetano Pedullà MEP
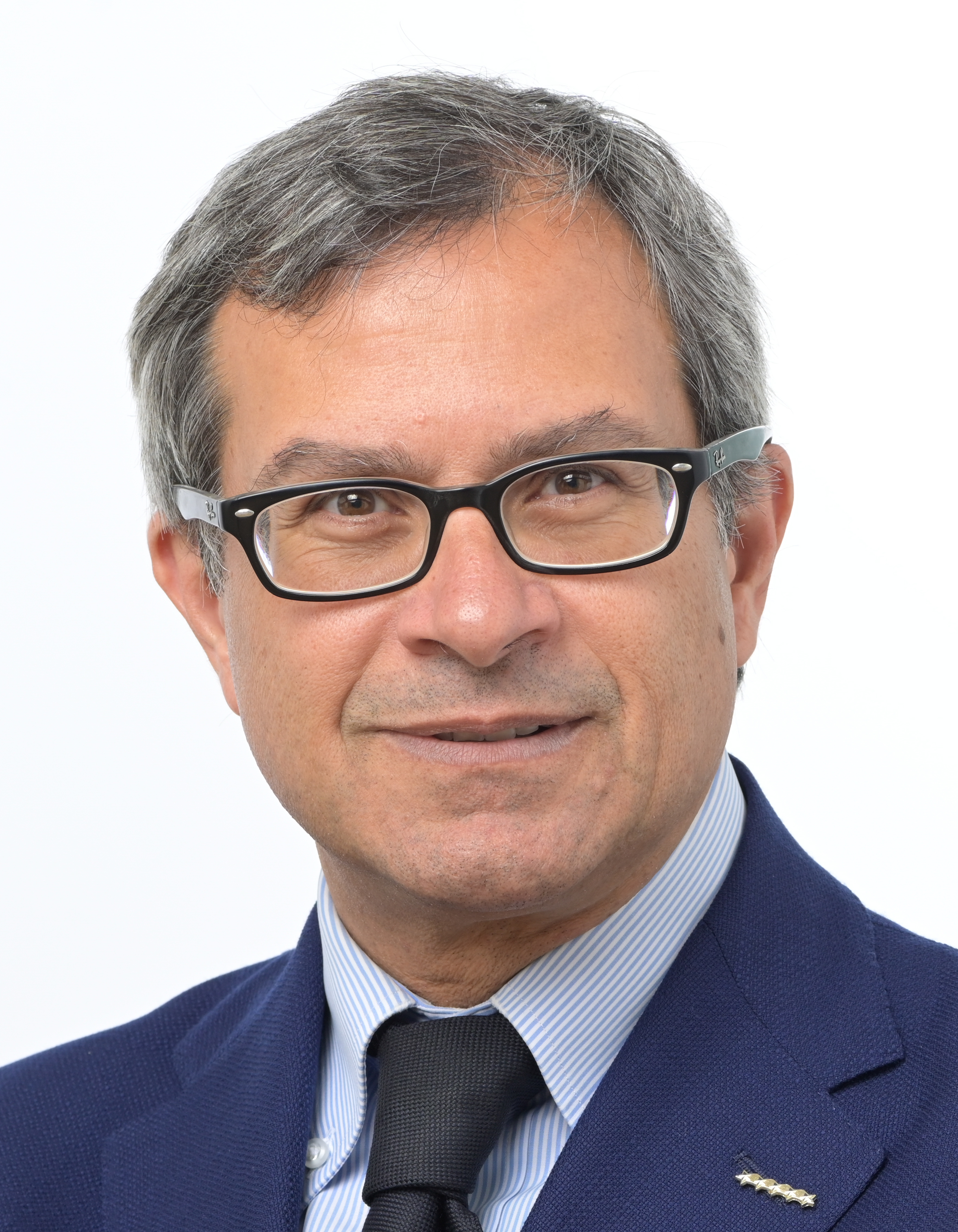
- Pedullà in 2024

Member of the European Parliament for North-West Italy
- Incumbent
- Assumed office 16 July 2024

Personal details
- Born: 5 January 1967 (age 59) Catania, Italy
- Party: Five Star Movement
- Other political affiliations: The Left

Gaetano Pedullà (born 5 January 1967) is an Italian journalist and politician of the Five Star Movement who was elected member of the European Parliament in 2024. He is the founder of La Notizia and a former editor of Il Tempo.
