= Ilaria D'Amico =

Italian TV host and commentator (born 1973)

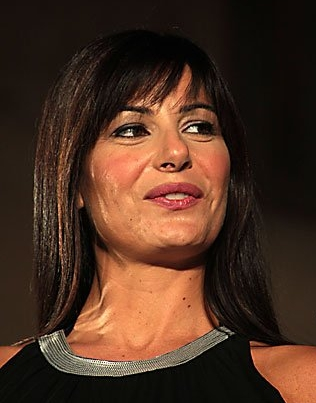
- Born: Ilaria D'Amico; 30 August 1973 (age 52); Rome, Italy
- Spouse: Gianluigi Buffon (m. 2024)
- Children: 2
- Website: www.ilariadamico.it

Ilaria D'Amico (born 30 August 1973) is an Italian television host and commentator. She is most known for her work on shows related to football. In June 2018 she left Sky Sport.

D'Amico was one of over 80 Italian celebrities to sign a petition in favour of the 2016 referendum on constitutional reform.

== Personal life ==
D'Amico had been in a relationship with Rocco Attisani, a real estate developer and entrepreneur, with whom she had a son.

Since 2014, D'Amico has been in a relationship with goalkeeper Gianluigi Buffon, and in the summer of 2017 they became engaged. On 28 September 2024, Buffon and D'Amico married in Tuscany. They have a son, born on 6 January 2016.

She considers herself Roman Catholic.
