= La Notizia =

Newspaper in Rome, Italy

La Notizia is an Italian newspaper which was started by Gaetano Pedullà, an Italian journalist and politician, and other journalists in 2013. The paper is headquartered in Rome. Gaetano Pedullà is the editor-in-chief of the paper.
