= Marta Grande =

Italian politician (born 1987)

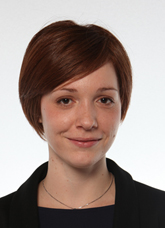
- Marta Grande
- Born: 22 November 1987 (age 38); Civitavecchia, Italy
- Education: Roma Tre University; University of Alabama
- Occupation: Politician
- Political party: M5S (2013–2022); IC (2022)

Marta Grande (born 22 November 1987) is an Italian politician. As a member of the Five Star Movement, she has been the chair of the Committee on Foreign and European Union Affairs of Italy's Chamber of Deputies from 2018 to 2022. She is also the youngest female MP in the 17th legislature.

== Early life and education ==
Born in Civitavecchia, in the Lazio region, Grande holds a BA from the University of Alabama in Huntsville, a MA in European studies (with a thesis on transatlantic relations), and another master's degree in international relations and diplomatic studies. She also studied in Beijing in 2012 following a course held by PKU and LSU.

== Political career ==
Since 2013, Grande has been a member of the foreign affairs committee and member of the permanent committee on the European Union's foreign policy and external relations. Since 2015, she has been the secretary of the permanent Committee on Human Rights. On 24 June 2014, Grande held a speech in the Italian parliament discussing Ukraine.

In June 2018, Grande was elected president of the Foreign Affairs Committee of the Chamber of Deputies. She became the youngest MP and first woman to held this position. In addition to her committee assignments, Grande led the Italian delegation to the Parliamentary Assembly of the Council of Europe since 2021. In this capacity, she served on the Committee on Culture, Science, Education and Media (since 2021) and the Sub-Committee on Education, Youth and Sport (since 2022). Since 2021, she has been one of the assembly’s vice-presidents under the leadership of presidents Rik Daems (2021–2022) and Tiny Kox (since 2022).
