= Craxism =

Italian syncretic political ideology associated with Bettino Craxi

Craxism (Italian: Craxismo) is a political ideology based on the thought of Italian socialist leader Bettino Craxi, who was Prime Minister of Italy during the 1980s. Craxism was the informal doctrine of the Italian Socialist Party (Partito Socialista Italiano; PSI) from 1976 to 1994, the year when both the First Republic and the PSI itself were dissolved due to corruption scandals.

== Origins and features ==
Craxism, although considered a derogatory term today, was based on a synthesis of social democracy, socialism and liberal conservatism. Although the PSI under Craxi was associated with typical centre-left stances such as third-worldism, pro-Arabism, environmentalism and a belief in the modern welfare state, it was also pro-Atlanticist and pro-europeanist, supported privatisation and liberalisation measures, and placed a strong emphasis on defending territorial sovereignty (e.g. the Sigonella crisis) and on promoting conservative policies relating to issues such as abortion and the war on drugs.

Thus, under Craxi the PSI moved from being on the left, close to the Italian Communist Party (Partito Comunista Italiano; PCI), to a position much nearer the centre. This allowed the party to ally with the Christian Democrats and sundry other moderate parties, thereby helping to provide a stable governing coalition throughout the 1980s (known informally as the Pentapartito).

== Critics and supporters ==
In Italy, the main critics of Craxism (as well as of Craxi himself) are mostly either former Communist politicians – including many current members of the Democratic Party – or writers in left-wing newspapers (Il Fatto Quotidiano, il manifesto, L'Espresso, La Repubblica, etc.). Its biggest supporters, meanwhile, are the PSI of Riccardo Nencini and various politicians from the centre right, most notably Silvio Berlusconi (a close associate of Craxi in the 1980s), Renato Brunetta, Maurizio Sacconi, Stefano Caldoro and Stefania Craxi, Bettino's daughter. Abroad, Craxi received fulsome praise from figures such as Mário Soares, Ricardo Lagos, Felipe González, Lech Wałęsa, Ronald Reagan, Sergio Romano (Italian Ambassador in the USA), Renato Ruggiero (Socialist diplomat and former Director of the WTO) and Boris Biancheri (writer and diplomat).

== Influence ==
Craxism led to a change in the entire nature of European socialism. Together with fellow moderate socialist leaders such as Felipe González, François Mitterrand and Helmut Schmidt, Craxi moved socialism in a direction more favourable to liberal reformism and the market economy. In addition, Craxism later inspired the overhaul and redeveloped policies of Tony Blair's Labour Party in Britain, the PSOE under José Zapatero, and Andreas Papandreou's PASOK in Greece.
