= Donatella Albano =

Italian politician

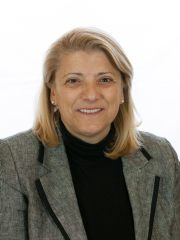

Personal details
- Born: 21 January 1958 (age 68) Bordighera, Liguria, Italy
- Party: Democratic Party of Italy
- Occupation: Politician

Donatella Albano (born 21 January 1958) is an Italian politician from the Democratic Party of Italy. As of 2014 she serves as Senator of the Parliament of Italy representing Liguria.

== Biography ==
An office worker, she serves as a social services officer at the Italian Farmers' Confederation in Bordighera, where she served as a city council member from 2007 to 2011.

Active in Catholic organizations, in the anti-mafia group Libera (association), in sports, and in politics with the Democratic Party (Italy), she served as the party’s provincial chair in Imperia and as a member of the national assembly.

In December 2012, she ran in the Democratic Party’s primary elections to select parliamentary candidates for the 2013 elections, finishing first in the province of Imperia. In the 2013 general election, she ran for the Senate of the Republic (Italy) in the Liguria region as the Democratic Party (Italy) lead candidate and was elected to the Senate for the 17th Legislature.

She did not run for re-election in the 2018 general election, as she was excluded from the Democratic Party (Italy) candidate lists.

She was married to Severino, a railroad worker, and had two children, Stefano and Diana.
