= Italian Monarchist Union =

Italian Monarchist Union Unione Monarchica Italiana
- President: Alessandro Sacchi
- Founded: 1 October 1945
- Newspaper: Fert (until 2017)
- Youth wing: Youth Monarchist Front
- Membership (2017): 80,000
- Ideology: Monarchism
- Colours: Savoy blue

Website
- www.unionemonarchicaitaliana.it

The Italian Monarchist Union (Italian: Unione Monarchica Italiana, UMI) is an Italian political movement, which has not contested any election since 1946. Its chief aim is to restore monarchy in Italy. The UMI supports Prince Aimone, Duke of Aosta as King of Italy.
