= List of members of the European Parliament (1979–1984) =

Between 17 July 1979 and 23 July 1984, 551 individuals served in the European Parliament. 410 members were elected during the European Parliament election of 7–10 June 1979. 24 members were appointed in 1981 after Greece joined the European Union and replaced after the 1981 European Parliament election in Greece. The other members were replacements.

== List ==
Name	Constituency	National party	EP Group	Begin date	End date	Ref.
Victor Abens	Luxembourg	Socialist Workers' Party	SOC	17 July 1979	23 July 1984	
Gordon Adam	United Kingdom – Northumbria	Labour Party	SOC	17 July 1979	23 July 1984	
Dimitrios Adamou	Greece	Communist Party	COM	2 November 1981	23 July 1984	
Pietro Adonnino	Italy	Christian Democracy	EPP	17 July 1979	23 July 1984	
Jochen van Aerssen	West Germany	Christian Democratic Union	EPP	17 July 1979	23 July 1984	
Susanna Agnelli	Italy	Republican Party	ELDR	17 July 1979	1 October 1981	
Heinrich Aigner	West Germany	Christian Social Union	EPP	17 July 1979	23 July 1984	
Alexandros Alavanos	Greece	Communist Party	COM	2 November 1981	23 July 1984	
Siegbert Alber	West Germany	Christian Democratic Union	EPP	17 July 1979	23 July 1984	
Willem Albers	Netherlands	Labour Party	SOC	17 July 1979	23 July 1984	
Mechthild von Alemann	West Germany	Free Democratic Party	ELDR	17 July 1979	23 July 1984	
Georgios Alexiadis	Greece	Progressive Party	NI	16 November 1982	23 July 1984	
Nicolas Alfonsi	France	Radical Party of the Left	SOC	1 September 1981	23 July 1984	
Giorgio Almirante	Italy	Social Movement	NI	17 July 1979	23 July 1984	
Giorgio Amendola	Italy	Communist Party	COM	17 July 1979	5 June 1980	
Magdeleine Anglade	France	National Centre of Independents and Peasants	EPD	6 October 1982	18 November 1983	
Gustave Ansart	France	Communist Party	COM	17 July 1979	27 September 1981	
Vincent Ansquer	France	Defense of French Interests in Europe	EPD	17 July 1979	23 July 1984	
Dario Antoniozzi	Italy	Christian Democracy	EPP	17 July 1979	23 July 1984	
Gaetano Arfé	Italy	Socialist Party	SOC	17 July 1979	23 July 1984	
Rudi Arndt	West Germany	Social Democratic Party	SOC	17 July 1979	23 July 1984	
Fabrizia Baduel Glorioso	Italy	Communist Party (Independent)	COM	17 July 1979	23 July 1984	
Louis Baillot	France	Communist Party	COM	17 July 1979	23 July 1984	
Richard Balfe	United Kingdom – London South Inner	Labour Party	SOC	17 July 1979	23 July 1984	
Neil Balfour	United Kingdom – Yorkshire North	Conservative Party	ED	17 July 1979	23 July 1984	
Martin Bangemann	West Germany	Free Democratic Party	ELDR	17 July 1979	27 June 1984	
Giovanni Barbagli	Italy	Christian Democracy	EPP	17 July 1979	23 July 1984	
Carla Barbarella	Italy	Communist Party	COM	17 July 1979	23 July 1984	
Paolo Barbi	Italy	Christian Democracy	EPP	17 July 1979	23 July 1984	
Robert Battersby	United Kingdom – Humberside	Conservative Party	ED	17 July 1979	23 July 1984	
Pierre Baudis	France	Union for French Democracy	ELDR (Note: Until 31 December 1980)	17 July 1979	23 July 1984	
Pierre Baudis	France	Union for French Democracy	EPP (Note: Since 1 January 1981)	17 July 1979	23 July 1984	
Peter Beazley	United Kingdom – Bedfordshire South	Conservative Party	ED	17 July 1979	23 July 1984	
Cornelis Berkhouwer	Netherlands	People's Party for Freedom and Democracy	ELDR	17 July 1979	23 July 1984	
Enrico Berlinguer	Italy	Communist Party	COM	17 July 1979	11 June 1984	
Pierre Bernard	France	Socialist Party	SOC	25 March 1983	23 July 1984	
Giovanni Bersani	Italy	Christian Democracy	EPP	17 July 1979	23 July 1984	
Nicholas Bethell	United Kingdom – London North West	Conservative Party	ED	17 July 1979	23 July 1984	
Vincenzo Bettiza	Italy	Liberal Party	ELDR	17 July 1979	23 July 1984	
Bouke Beumer	Netherlands	Christian Democratic Appeal	EPP	17 July 1979	23 July 1984	
Luc Beyer de Ryke	Belgium – French-speaking	Liberal Reformist Party	ELDR	11 July 1980	23 July 1984	
Philipp von Bismarck	West Germany	Christian Democratic Union	EPP	17 July 1979	23 July 1984	
Neil Blaney	Ireland – Connacht–Ulster	Independent Fianna Fáil	TGI	17 July 1979	23 July 1984	
Erik Blumenfeld	West Germany	Christian Democratic Union	EPP	17 July 1979	23 July 1984	
Reinhold Bocklet	West Germany	Christian Social Union	EPP	17 July 1979	23 July 1984	
Fernand Boden	Luxembourg	Christian Social People's Party	EPP	17 July 1979	18 July 1979	
Jørgen Bøgh	Denmark	People's Movement against the EEC	TGI	17 July 1979	23 July 1984	
Alain Bombard	France	Socialist Party	SOC	1 September 1981	23 July 1984	
Aldo Bonaccini	Italy	Communist Party	COM	17 July 1979	23 July 1984	
Jens-Peter Bonde	Denmark	People's Movement against the EEC	TGI	17 July 1979	23 July 1984	
Emma Bonino	Italy	Radical Party	TGI	17 July 1979	23 July 1984	
Elise Boot	Netherlands	Christian Democratic Appeal	EPP	17 July 1979	23 July 1984	
André Bord	France	Defense of French Interests in Europe	EPD	19 April 1982	23 July 1984	
Bodil Boserup	Denmark	Socialist People's Party	COM	17 July 1979	23 July 1984	
Leonidas Bournias	Greece	New Democracy	NI	1 January 1981	18 October 1981	
Leonidas Bournias	Greece	New Democracy	EPP	2 November 1981	23 July 1984	
Roland Boyes	United Kingdom – Durham	Labour Party	SOC	17 July 1979	23 July 1984	
Willy Brandt	West Germany	Social Democratic Party	SOC	17 July 1979	1 March 1983	
Elmar Brok	West Germany	Christian Democratic Union	EPP	17 June 1980	23 July 1984	
Beata Brookes	United Kingdom – Wales North	Conservative Party	ED	17 July 1979	23 July 1984	
Dominique Bucchini	France	Communist Party	COM	28 September 1981	23 July 1984	
Janey Buchan	United Kingdom – Glasgow	Labour Party	SOC	17 July 1979	23 July 1984	
Hubert Jean Buchou	France	Defense of French Interests in Europe	EPD	17 July 1979	30 September 1980	
Antonino Buttafuoco	Italy	Social Movement	NI	17 July 1979	23 July 1984	
Richard Caborn	United Kingdom – Sheffield	Labour Party	SOC	17 July 1979	23 July 1984	
Henri-Guy Caillavet	France	Union for French Democracy	ELDR (Note: Until 4 May 1982)	17 July 1979	23 July 1984	
Henri-Guy Caillavet	France	Union for French Democracy	SOC (Note: Since 4 May 1982)	17 July 1979	23 July 1984	
Corentin Calvez	France	Union for French Democracy	ELDR	17 July 1979	23 July 1984	
Mario Capanna	Italy	Proletarian Democracy	TGI	17 July 1979	23 July 1984	
Umberto Cardia	Italy	Communist Party	COM	17 July 1979	23 July 1984	
Tullia Carettoni Romagnoli	Italy	Communist Party (Independent)	COM	17 July 1979	23 July 1984	
Antonio Cariglia	Italy	Democratic Socialist Party	SOC	17 July 1979	23 July 1984	
Angelo Carossino	Italy	Communist Party	COM	17 July 1979	23 July 1984	
Maria Luisa Cassanmagnago Cerretti	Italy	Christian Democracy	EPP	17 July 1979	23 July 1984	
Luciana Castellina	Italy	Proletarian Unity Party	TGI	17 July 1979	23 July 1984	
Barbara Castle	United Kingdom – Greater Manchester North	Labour Party	SOC	17 July 1979	23 July 1984	
Fred Catherwood	United Kingdom – Cambridgeshire	Conservative Party	ED	17 July 1979	23 July 1984	
Manlio Cecovini	Italy	Liberal Party	ELDR	17 July 1979	23 July 1984	
Domenico Ceravolo	Italy	Communist Party	COM	17 July 1979	23 July 1984	
Robert Chambeiron	France	Communist Party	COM	17 July 1979	23 July 1984	
Raphaël Chanterie	Belgium – Dutch-speaking	Christian People's Party	EPP	17 December 1981	23 July 1984	
Gisèle Charzat	France	Socialist Party	SOC	17 July 1979	23 July 1984	
Jacques Chirac	France	Defense of French Interests in Europe	EPD	17 July 1979	28 April 1980	
Nicole Chouraqui	France	Defense of French Interests in Europe	EPD	17 July 1979	17 October 1980	
Maria Lisa Cinciari Rodano	Italy	Communist Party	COM	17 July 1979	23 July 1984	
Gaetano Cingari	Italy	Socialist Party	SOC	3 October 1983	23 July 1984	
Jean-José Clement	France	Defense of French Interests in Europe	EPD	11 July 1980	16 February 1982	
Mark Clinton	Ireland – Leinster	Fine Gael	EPP	17 July 1979	23 July 1984	
Frank Cluskey	Ireland – Dublin	Labour Party	SOC	1 July 1981	14 December 1982	
Ann Clwyd	United Kingdom – Wales Mid & West	Labour Party	SOC	17 July 1979	23 July 1984	
Bob Cohen	Netherlands	Labour Party	SOC	17 July 1979	23 July 1984	
Marcel Colla	Belgium – Dutch-speaking	Socialist Party	SOC	17 July 1979	31 January 1982	
Arnaldo Colleselli	Italy	Christian Democracy	EPP	17 July 1979	23 July 1984	
Ken Collins	United Kingdom – Strathclyde East	Labour Party	SOC	17 July 1979	23 July 1984	
Francisque Collomb	France	Union for French Democracy	EPP	17 July 1979	23 July 1984	
Emilio Colombo	Italy	Christian Democracy	EPP	17 July 1979	14 April 1980	
Francis Combe	France	Union for French Democracy	ELDR	17 July 1979	15 April 1982	
Maurits Coppieters	Belgium – Dutch-speaking	People's Union	TGI	17 July 1979	12 February 1981	
Francesco Cosentino	Italy	Democratic Socialist Party	SOC	16 January 1984	23 July 1984	
Roberto Costanzo	Italy	Christian Democracy	EPP	17 July 1979	23 July 1984	
Richard Cottrell	United Kingdom – Bristol	Conservative Party	ED	17 July 1979	23 July 1984	
Pierre-Bernard Cousté	France	Defense of French Interests in Europe	EPD	13 October 1980	23 July 1984	
Yannis Coutsocheras	Greece	Socialist Movement	SOC	1 January 1981	18 October 1981	
Bettino Craxi	Italy	Socialist Party	SOC	17 July 1979	4 August 1983	
Édith Cresson	France	Socialist Party	SOC	17 July 1979	16 June 1981	
Jerry Cronin	Ireland – Munster	Fianna Fáil	EPD	17 July 1979	23 May 1984	
Lambert Croux	Belgium – Dutch-speaking	Christian People's Party	EPP	17 July 1979	23 July 1984	
David Curry	United Kingdom – Essex North East	Conservative Party	ED	17 July 1979	23 July 1984	
Georgios Dalakouras	Greece	New Democracy	NI	1 January 1981	18 October 1981	
Joachim Dalsass	Italy	People's Party (South Tyrol)	EPP	17 July 1979	23 July 1984	
Ian Dalziel	United Kingdom – Lothians	Conservative Party	ED	17 July 1979	23 July 1984	
Félix Damette	France	Communist Party	COM	17 July 1979	23 July 1984	
André Damseaux	Belgium – French-speaking	Liberal Reformist Party	ELDR	17 July 1979	23 July 1984	
Francescopaolo D'Angelosante	Italy	Communist Party	COM	17 July 1979	23 July 1984	
Pieter Dankert	Netherlands	Labour Party	SOC	17 July 1979	18 January 1982	
Pieter Dankert	Netherlands	Labour Party	SOC	19 January 1982	23 July 1984	
Noel Michael Davern	Ireland – Munster	Fianna Fáil	EPD	17 July 1979	23 July 1984	
Willy De Clercq	Belgium – Dutch-speaking	Party for Freedom and Progress	ELDR	17 July 1979	17 December 1981	
Karel De Gucht	Belgium – Dutch-speaking	Party for Freedom and Progress	ELDR	21 May 1980	23 July 1984	
Paul De Keersmaeker	Belgium – Dutch-speaking	Christian People's Party	EPP	17 July 1979	17 December 1981	
Pancrazio De Pasquale	Italy	Communist Party	COM	17 July 1979	23 July 1984	
Sile De Valera	Ireland – Dublin	Fianna Fáil	EPD	17 July 1979	23 July 1984	
Michel Debatisse	France	Union for French Democracy	EPP	17 July 1979	24 October 1979	
Michel Debré	France	Defense of French Interests in Europe	EPD	17 July 1979	30 September 1980	
Suzanne Dekker	Netherlands	Democrats 66	NI	17 July 1979	10 June 1981	
Antonio Del Duca	Italy	Christian Democracy	EPP	16 April 1980	23 July 1984	
Charles Delatte	France	Union for French Democracy	ELDR	17 July 1979	23 July 1984	
Gustave Deleau	France	Defense of French Interests in Europe	EPD	17 July 1979	23 July 1984	
Fernand Delmotte	Belgium – French-speaking	Socialist Party	SOC	17 July 1979	31 March 1982	
Robert Delorozoy	France	Union for French Democracy	ELDR	17 July 1979	23 July 1984	
Jacques Delors	France	Socialist Party	SOC	17 July 1979	16 June 1981	
Xavier Deniau	France	Defense of French Interests in Europe	EPD	18 September 1981	14 April 1983	
Jacques Denis	France	Communist Party	COM	17 July 1979	23 July 1984	
Pierre Deschamps	Belgium – French-speaking	Christian Social Party	EPP	21 May 1980	23 July 1984	
Eileen Desmond	Ireland – Munster	Labour Party	SOC	17 July 1979	7 July 1981	
Marie-Jacqueline Desouches	France	Socialist Party	SOC	11 September 1981	23 July 1984	
Mario Di Bartolomei	Italy	Republican Party	ELDR	26 September 1983	23 July 1984	
Alfredo Diana	Italy	Christian Democracy	EPP	17 July 1979	23 July 1984	
Mario Dido	Italy	Socialist Party	SOC	17 July 1979	23 July 1984	
Marie-Madeleine Dienesch	France	Defense of French Interests in Europe	EPD	17 July 1979	30 September 1980	
André Diligent	France	Union for French Democracy	EPP	17 July 1979	23 July 1984	
Ioannis Dimopoulos	Greece	New Democracy	NI	1 January 1981	18 October 1981	
Georges Donnez	France	Union for French Democracy	ELDR	17 July 1979	23 July 1984	
Maurice Doublet	France	Defense of French Interests in Europe	EPD	1 July 1980	19 June 1981	
Maurice Druon	France	Defense of French Interests in Europe	EPD	17 July 1979	20 June 1980	
Paule Duport	France	Socialist Party	SOC	1 November 1981	23 July 1984	
Raymonde Dury	Belgium – French-speaking	Socialist Party	SOC	31 March 1982	23 July 1984	
Doeke Eisma	Netherlands	Democrats 66	NI	11 June 1981	23 July 1984	
Diana Elles	United Kingdom – Thames Valley	Conservative Party	ED	17 July 1979	23 July 1984	
Derek Enright	United Kingdom – Leeds	Labour Party	SOC	17 July 1979	23 July 1984	
Vassilis Ephremidis	Greece	Communist Party	COM	2 November 1981	23 July 1984	
Sergio Ercini	Italy	Christian Democracy	EPP	9 September 1982	23 July 1984	
Nicolas Estgen	Luxembourg	Christian Social People's Party	EPP	14 August 1979	23 July 1984	
Claude Estier	France	Socialist Party	SOC	17 July 1979	1 September 1981	
Winifred Ewing	United Kingdom – Highlands and Islands	Scottish National Party	EPD	17 July 1979	23 July 1984	
Louis Eyraud	France	Socialist Party	SOC	15 September 1981	23 July 1984	
Roger Fajardie	France	Socialist Party	SOC	17 June 1981	23 July 1984	
Guido Fanti	Italy	Communist Party	COM	17 July 1979	23 July 1984	
André Fanton	France	Defense of French Interests in Europe	EPD	26 June 1980	19 April 1982	
Edgar Faure	France	Union for French Democracy	ELDR	17 July 1979	23 July 1984	
Maurice Faure	France	Radical Party of the Left	SOC	17 July 1979	4 June 1981	
Ludwig Fellermaier	West Germany	Social Democratic Party	SOC	17 July 1979	23 July 1984	
Adam Fergusson	United Kingdom – Strathclyde West	Conservative Party	ED	17 July 1979	23 July 1984	
Guy Fernandez	France	Communist Party	COM	17 July 1979	23 July 1984	
Basil de Ferranti	United Kingdom – Hampshire West	Conservative Party	ED	17 July 1979	23 July 1984	
Bruno Ferrero	Italy	Communist Party	COM	17 July 1979	23 July 1984	
Mauro Ferri	Italy	Democratic Socialist Party	SOC	17 July 1979	23 July 1984	
Ove Fich	Denmark	Social Democrats	SOC	7 November 1979	23 July 1984	
Eligio Filippi	Italy	Christian Democracy	EPP	17 July 1979	23 July 1984	
Marc Fischbach	Luxembourg	Christian Social People's Party	EPP	19 July 1979	23 July 1984	
Seán Flanagan	Ireland – Connacht–Ulster	Fianna Fáil	EPD	17 July 1979	23 July 1984	
Colette Flesch	Luxembourg	Democratic Party	ELDR	17 July 1979	22 November 1980	
Katharina Focke	West Germany	Social Democratic Party	SOC	17 July 1979	23 July 1984	
Raymond Forni	France	Socialist Party	SOC	17 June 1981	11 September 1981	
Norvela Forster	United Kingdom – Birmingham South	Conservative Party	ED	17 July 1979	23 July 1984	
Eric Forth	United Kingdom – Birmingham North	Conservative Party	ED	17 July 1979	23 July 1984	
Assimakis Fotilas	Greece	Socialist Movement	SOC	1 January 1981	18 October 1981	
Marie-Madeleine Fourcade	France	Defense of French Interests in Europe	EPD	13 October 1980	18 September 1981	
Dimitrios Frangos	Greece	New Democracy	NI	1 January 1981	18 October 1981	
Otmar Franz	West Germany	Christian Democratic Union	EPP	30 January 1981	23 July 1984	
Bruno Friedrich	West Germany	Social Democratic Party	SOC	17 July 1979	23 July 1984	
Ingo Friedrich	West Germany	Christian Social Union	EPP	17 July 1979	23 July 1984	
Georges Louis Frischmann	France	Communist Party	COM	17 July 1979	23 July 1984	
Isidor Früh	West Germany	Christian Democratic Union	EPP	17 July 1979	23 July 1984	
Gérard Fuchs	France	Socialist Party	SOC	17 June 1981	23 July 1984	
Karl Fuchs	West Germany	Christian Social Union	EPP	17 July 1979	23 July 1984	
Yvette Fuillet	France	Socialist Party	SOC	17 July 1979	23 July 1984	
Volkmar Gabert	West Germany	Social Democratic Party	SOC	17 July 1979	23 July 1984	
Paola Gaiotti	Italy	Christian Democracy	EPP	17 July 1979	23 July 1984	
Michael Gallagher	United Kingdom – Nottingham	Labour Party / SDP (Jan 1984)	SOC	17 July 1979	23 July 1984	
Yves Galland	France	Union for French Democracy	ELDR	17 July 1979	23 July 1984	
Carlo Alberto Galluzzi	Italy	Communist Party	COM	17 July 1979	23 July 1984	
Françoise Gaspard	France	Socialist Party	SOC	17 July 1979	1 September 1981	
Vincenzo Gatto	Italy	Socialist Party	SOC	17 July 1979	23 July 1984	
Roger Gauthier	France	Defense of French Interests in Europe	EPD	13 January 1983	23 July 1984	
Fritz Gautier	West Germany	Social Democratic Party	SOC	18 January 1980	23 July 1984	
Jas Gawronski	Italy	Republican Party	ELDR	19 October 1981	23 July 1984	
Paul-Henry Gendebien	Belgium – French-speaking	Democratic Front of the Francophones	NI (Note: Until December 1981)	17 July 1979	23 July 1984	
Paul-Henry Gendebien	Belgium – French-speaking	Democratic Front of the Francophones	TGI (Note: Since December 1981)	17 July 1979	23 July 1984	
Antonios Georgiadis	Greece	Socialist Movement	SOC	1 January 1981	18 October 1981	
Antonios Georgiadis	Greece	Socialist Movement	SOC	2 November 1981	5 July 1982	
Achillefs Gerokostopoulos	Greece	New Democracy	EPP	2 November 1981	23 July 1984	
François-Marie Géronimi	France	Defense of French Interests in Europe	EPD	17 October 1980	23 July 1984	
Aart Geurtsen	Netherlands	People's Party for Freedom and Democracy	ELDR	17 July 1979	23 July 1984	
Alberto Ghergo	Italy	Christian Democracy	EPP	17 July 1979	23 July 1984	
Giovanni Giavazzi	Italy	Christian Democracy	EPP	17 July 1979	23 July 1984	
Alain Gillot	France	Defense of French Interests in Europe	EPD	17 July 1979	30 September 1980	
Vincenzo Giummarra	Italy	Christian Democracy	EPP	17 July 1979	23 July 1984	
Ernest Glinne	Belgium – French-speaking	Socialist Party	SOC	17 July 1979	23 July 1984	
Illias Glykofridis	Greece	Progressive Party	NI	17 September 1982	20 October 1982	
Aar de Goede	Netherlands	Democrats 66	NI	17 July 1979	23 July 1984	
Charles Goerens	Luxembourg	Democratic Party	ELDR	15 February 1982	23 July 1984	
Guido Gonella	Italy	Christian Democracy	EPP	17 July 1979	19 August 1982	
Konstantinos Gontikas	Greece	New Democracy	NI	1 January 1981	18 October 1981	
Konstantinos Gontikas	Greece	New Democracy	EPP	2 November 1981	23 July 1984	
Alfons Goppel	West Germany	Christian Social Union	EPP	17 July 1979	23 July 1984	
Anselmo Gouthier	Italy	Communist Party	COM	17 July 1979	23 July 1984	
Eva Gredal	Denmark	Social Democrats	SOC	17 July 1979	23 July 1984	
François Gremetz	France	Communist Party	COM	17 July 1979	23 July 1984	
Jim Griffiths	United Kingdom – Wales South	Labour Party	SOC	17 July 1979	23 July 1984	
Mette Groes	Denmark	Social Democrats	SOC	17 July 1979	18 September 1980	
Frans van der Gun	Netherlands	Christian Democratic Appeal	EPP	17 July 1979	31 December 1981	
Niels Jørgen Haagerup	Denmark	Left, Liberal Party	ELDR	17 July 1979	23 July 1984	
Otto von Habsburg	West Germany	Christian Social Union	EPP	17 July 1979	23 July 1984	
Wilhelm Hahn	West Germany	Christian Democratic Union	EPP	17 July 1979	23 July 1984	
Brendan Halligan	Ireland – Dublin	Labour Party	SOC	2 March 1983	23 July 1984	
Jean Hamilius	Luxembourg	Democratic Party	ELDR	19 July 1979	15 January 1982	
Else Hammerich	Denmark	People's Movement against the EEC	TGI	17 July 1979	23 July 1984	
Ioannis Haralampopoulos	Greece	Socialist Movement	SOC	1 January 1981	18 October 1981	
Klaus Hänsch	West Germany	Social Democratic Party	SOC	17 July 1979	23 July 1984	
David Harris	United Kingdom – Cornwall & Plymouth	Conservative Party	ED	17 July 1979	23 July 1984	
Kai Uwe von Hassel	West Germany	Christian Democratic Union	EPP	17 July 1979	23 July 1984	
Karl Hauenschild	West Germany	Social Democratic Party	SOC	17 July 1979	14 January 1980	
Hermann Heinemann	West Germany	Social Democratic Party	SOC	11 March 1983	23 July 1984	
Wilhelm Helms	West Germany	Christian Democratic Union	EPP	17 July 1979	23 July 1984	
Marijke Van Hemeldonck	Belgium – Dutch-speaking	Socialist Party	SOC	31 January 1982	23 July 1984	
Jack Henckens	Belgium – Dutch-speaking	Christian People's Party	EPP	17 July 1979	7 September 1981	
Luise Herklotz	West Germany	Social Democratic Party	SOC	17 July 1979	23 July 1984	
Fernand Herman	Belgium – French-speaking	Christian Social Party	EPP	17 July 1979	23 July 1984	
Ien van den Heuvel	Netherlands	Labour Party	SOC	17 July 1979	23 July 1984	
Magdalene Hoff	West Germany	Social Democratic Party	SOC	17 July 1979	23 July 1984	
Jacqueline Hoffmann	France	Communist Party	COM	17 July 1979	23 July 1984	
Karl-Heinz Hoffmann	West Germany	Christian Democratic Union	EPP	17 July 1979	23 July 1984	
Gloria Hooper	United Kingdom – Liverpool	Conservative Party	ED	17 July 1979	23 July 1984	
William Hopper	United Kingdom – Greater Manchester West	Conservative Party	ED	17 July 1979	23 July 1984	
Brian Hord	United Kingdom – London West	Conservative Party	ED	17 July 1979	23 July 1984	
John Horgan	Ireland – Dublin	Labour Party	SOC	21 October 1981	1 January 1983	
Paul Howell	United Kingdom – Norfolk	Conservative Party	ED	17 July 1979	23 July 1984	
John Hume	United Kingdom – Northern Ireland	Social Democratic and Labour Party	SOC	17 July 1979	23 July 1984	
Alasdair Hutton	United Kingdom – South of Scotland	Conservative Party	ED	17 July 1979	23 July 1984	
Nilde Iotti	Italy	Communist Party	COM	17 July 1979	19 July 1979	
Felice Ippolito	Italy	Communist Party (Independent)	COM	17 July 1979	23 July 1984	
Ulrich Irmer	West Germany	Free Democratic Party	ELDR	17 July 1979	23 July 1984	
Gérard Israel	France	Defense of French Interests in Europe	EPD	16 May 1980	23 July 1984	
Christopher Jackson	United Kingdom – Kent East	Conservative Party	ED	17 July 1979	23 July 1984	
Robert Jackson	United Kingdom – Upper Thames	Conservative Party	ED	17 July 1979	23 July 1984	
Erhard Jakobsen	Denmark	Centre Democrats	ED (Note: Until 30 September 1980)	17 July 1979	23 July 1984	
Erhard Jakobsen	Denmark	Centre Democrats	NI (Note: 30 September 1980 – 9 February 1981)	17 July 1979	23 July 1984	
Erhard Jakobsen	Denmark	Centre Democrats	EPP (Note: Since 9 February 1981)	17 July 1979	23 July 1984	
Frédéric Jalton	France	Socialist Party	SOC	7 March 1980	14 September 1981	
Jim Janssen van Raay	Netherlands	Christian Democratic Appeal	EPP	17 July 1979	23 July 1984	
Gérard Jaquet	France	Socialist Party	SOC	17 July 1979	23 July 1984	
Stanley Johnson	United Kingdom – Wight & Hampshire East	Conservative Party	ED	17 July 1979	23 July 1984	
Sjouke Jonker	Netherlands	Christian Democratic Appeal	EPP	17 July 1979	23 July 1984	
Charles Josselin	France	Socialist Party	SOC	17 July 1979	15 July 1981	
Michel Junot	France	Defense of French Interests in Europe	EPD	19 June 1981	12 January 1983	
Heinrich Jürgens	West Germany	Free Democratic Party	ELDR	17 July 1979	23 July 1984	
Konstantinos Kallias	Greece	New Democracy	EPP	2 November 1981	23 July 1984	
Konstantinos Kalojannis	Greece	New Democracy	EPP	2 November 1981	23 July 1984	
Kostas Kappos	Greece	Communist Party	COM	9 February 1981	18 October 1981	
Gabriel Kaspereit	France	Defense of French Interests in Europe	EPD	25 July 1983	23 July 1984	
Ioannis Katsafados	Greece	New Democracy	NI	1 January 1981	18 October 1981	
Hans Katzer	West Germany	Christian Democratic Union	EPP	17 July 1979	23 July 1984	
Liam Kavanagh	Ireland – Leinster	Labour Party	SOC	17 July 1979	7 July 1981	
Filotas Kazazis	Greece	New Democracy	EPP	2 November 1981	23 July 1984	
Justin Keating	Ireland – Leinster	Labour Party	SOC	8 February 1984	23 July 1984	
Edward Kellett-Bowman	United Kingdom – Lancashire East	Conservative Party	ED	17 July 1979	23 July 1984	
Elaine Kellett-Bowman	United Kingdom – Cumbria	Conservative Party	ED	17 July 1979	23 July 1984	
Brian Key	United Kingdom – Yorkshire South	Labour Party	SOC	17 July 1979	23 July 1984	
Kent Kirk	Denmark	Conservative People's Party	ED	17 July 1979	23 July 1984	
Egon Klepsch	West Germany	Christian Democratic Union	EPP	17 July 1979	23 July 1984	
Jan Klinkenborg	West Germany	Social Democratic Party	SOC	17 July 1979	23 July 1984	
Herbert W. Köhler	West Germany	Christian Democratic Union	EPP	17 July 1979	16 January 1981	
Dimitrios Koulourianos	Greece	Socialist Movement	SOC	2 November 1981	9 November 1981	
Annie Krouwel-Vlam	Netherlands	Labour Party	SOC	17 July 1979	23 July 1984	
Heinz Kühn	West Germany	Social Democratic Party	SOC	17 July 1979	23 July 1984	
Leonidas Kyrkos	Greece	Communist Party (Interior)	COM	2 November 1981	23 July 1984	
Claude Labbé	France	Defense of French Interests in Europe	EPD	17 July 1979	9 July 1980	
Leonidas Lagakos	Greece	Socialist Movement	SOC	2 November 1981	23 July 1984	
Patrick Lalor	Ireland – Leinster	Fianna Fáil	EPD	17 July 1979	23 July 1984	
Pierre Lalumiere	France	Socialist Party	SOC	23 November 1981	23 July 1984	
Erwin Lange	West Germany	Social Democratic Party	SOC	17 July 1979	23 July 1984	
Horst Langes	West Germany	Christian Democratic Union	EPP	17 July 1979	23 July 1984	
Jean Lecanuet	France	Union for French Democracy	EPP	17 July 1979	23 July 1984	
Silvio Lega	Italy	Christian Democracy	EPP	17 July 1979	23 July 1984	
Gerd Ludwig Lemmer	West Germany	Christian Democratic Union	EPP	17 July 1979	23 July 1984	
Marcelle Lentz-Cornette	Luxembourg	Christian Social People's Party	EPP	5 March 1980	23 July 1984	
Marlene Lenz	West Germany	Christian Democratic Union	EPP	17 July 1979	23 July 1984	
Silvio Leonardi	Italy	Communist Party	COM	17 July 1979	23 July 1984	
Pietro Lezzi	Italy	Socialist Party	SOC	17 July 1979	23 July 1984	
Giosuè Ligios	Italy	Christian Democracy	EPP	17 July 1979	23 July 1984	
Salvatore Lima	Italy	Christian Democracy	EPP	17 July 1979	23 July 1984	
Erdmann Linde	West Germany	Social Democratic Party	SOC	17 July 1979	30 September 1981	
John Ling	United Kingdom – Midlands Central	Conservative Party	ED	17 July 1979	23 July 1984	
Rolf Linkohr	West Germany	Social Democratic Party	SOC	17 July 1979	23 July 1984	
Jean Lipkowski	France	Defense of French Interests in Europe	EPD	13 October 1980	16 December 1981	
Anne-Marie Lizin	Belgium – French-speaking	Socialist Party	SOC	17 July 1979	23 July 1984	
Eugen Loderer	West Germany	Social Democratic Party	SOC	17 July 1979	14 January 1980	
Alfred Lomas	United Kingdom – London North East	Labour Party	SOC	17 July 1979	23 July 1984	
Charles-Emile Loo	France	Socialist Party	SOC	17 July 1979	23 July 1984	
Konstantinos Loules	Greece	Communist Party (Interior)	COM	1 January 1981	9 February 1981	
Hendrik Jan Louwes	Netherlands	People's Party for Freedom and Democracy	ELDR	17 July 1979	23 July 1984	
Hans August Lücker	West Germany	Christian Social Union	EPP	17 July 1979	23 July 1984	
Rudolf Luster	West Germany	Christian Democratic Union	EPP	17 July 1979	23 July 1984	
Finn Lynge	Denmark	Forward	SOC	17 July 1979	23 July 1984	
Luigi Macario	Italy	Christian Democracy	EPP	17 July 1979	23 July 1984	
Maria Antonietta Macciocchi	Italy	Radical Party	TGI	28 September 1979	23 July 1984	
Emmanuel Maffre-Baugé	France	Communist Party	COM	17 July 1979	23 July 1984	
Thomas Joseph Maher	Ireland – Munster	Independent	ELDR	17 July 1979	23 July 1984	
Hanja Maij-Weggen	Netherlands	Christian Democratic Appeal	EPP	17 July 1979	23 July 1984	
Ernst Majonica	West Germany	Christian Democratic Union	EPP	17 July 1979	23 July 1984	
Kurt Malangré	West Germany	Christian Democratic Union	EPP	17 July 1979	23 July 1984	
Christian de la Malène	France	Defense of French Interests in Europe	EPD	17 July 1979	23 July 1984	
Danielle de March	France	Communist Party	COM	17 July 1979	23 July 1984	
Georges Marchais	France	Communist Party	COM	17 July 1979	23 July 1984	
Roland Marchesin	France	Socialist Party	SOC	1 January 1984	23 July 1984	
Pol Marck	Belgium – Dutch-speaking	Christian People's Party	EPP	7 September 1981	23 July 1984	
Christos Markopoulos	Greece	Socialist Movement	SOC	2 November 1981	23 July 1984	
Spyridon Markozanis	Greece	New Democracy	NI	1 January 1981	18 October 1981	
John Marshall	United Kingdom – London North	Conservative Party	ED	17 July 1979	23 July 1984	
René Mart	Luxembourg	Democratic Party	ELDR	26 November 1980	23 July 1984	
Maurice Martin	France	Communist Party	COM	17 July 1979	23 July 1984	
Simone Martin	France	Union for French Democracy	ELDR	17 July 1979	23 July 1984	
Gilles Martinet	France	Socialist Party	SOC	17 July 1979	23 November 1981	
Pierre Mauroy	France	Socialist Party	SOC	17 July 1979	6 March 1980	
Sylvie Mayer	France	Communist Party	COM	17 July 1979	23 July 1984	
Joe McCartin	Ireland – Connacht–Ulster	Fine Gael	EPP	17 July 1979	23 July 1984	
Thomas Megahy	United Kingdom – Yorkshire South West	Labour Party	SOC	17 July 1979	23 July 1984	
Jean Méo	France	Defense of French Interests in Europe	EPD	18 September 1981	30 September 1982	
Meinolf Mertens	West Germany	Christian Democratic Union	EPP	17 July 1979	23 July 1984	
Pierre Messmer	France	Defense of French Interests in Europe	EPD	17 July 1979	27 June 1980	
Victor Michel	Belgium – French-speaking	Christian Social Party	EPP	17 July 1979	5 November 1982	
Karl-Heinrich Mihr	West Germany	Social Democratic Party	SOC	16 January 1980	23 July 1984	
Johan van Minnen	Netherlands	Labour Party	SOC	17 July 1979	23 July 1984	
Marcello Modiano	Italy	Communist Party	COM	23 July 1979	23 July 1984	
Poul Møller	Denmark	Conservative People's Party	ED	17 July 1979	23 July 1984	
Joep Mommersteeg	Netherlands	Christian Democratic Appeal	EPP	18 January 1982	23 July 1984	
James Moorhouse	United Kingdom – London South	Conservative Party	ED	17 July 1979	23 July 1984	
Jacques Moreau	France	Socialist Party	SOC	17 July 1979	23 July 1984	
Louise Moreau	France	Union for French Democracy	EPP	17 July 1979	23 July 1984	
Robert Moreland	United Kingdom – Staffordshire East	Conservative Party	ED	17 July 1979	23 July 1984	
Didier Motchane	France	Socialist Party	SOC	17 July 1979	23 July 1984	
Jean Mouchel	France	Defense of French Interests in Europe	EPD	16 February 1982	30 September 1983	
Ernst Müller-Hermann	West Germany	Christian Democratic Union	EPP	17 July 1979	23 July 1984	
Hemmo Muntingh	Netherlands	Labour Party	SOC	17 July 1979	23 July 1984	
Angelo Narducci	Italy	Christian Democracy	EPP	17 July 1979	10 May 1984	
Jacqueline Nebout	France	Defense of French Interests in Europe	EPD	25 April 1983	23 July 1984	
Bill Newton Dunn	United Kingdom – Lincolnshire	Conservative Party	ED	17 July 1979	23 July 1984	
Harmar Nicholls	United Kingdom – Greater Manchester South	Conservative Party	ED	17 July 1979	23 July 1984	
David Nicolson	United Kingdom – London Central	Conservative Party	ED	17 July 1979	23 July 1984	
Brøndlund Nielsen	Denmark	Left, Liberal Party	ELDR	17 July 1979	23 July 1984	
Tove Nielsen	Denmark	Left, Liberal Party	ELDR	17 July 1979	23 July 1984	
Kalliopi Nikolaou	Greece	Socialist Movement	SOC	2 November 1981	23 July 1984	
Konstantinos Nikolaou	Greece	Socialist Movement	SOC	1 January 1981	18 October 1981	
Konstantinos Nikolaou	Greece	Socialist Movement	SOC	2 November 1981	23 July 1984	
Hans Nord	Netherlands	People's Party for Freedom and Democracy	ELDR	17 July 1979	23 July 1984	
Franz-Josef Nordlohne	West Germany	Christian Democratic Union	EPP	17 July 1979	29 January 1981	
Jean-Thomas Nordmann	France	Union for French Democracy	ELDR	16 April 1982	23 July 1984	
Tom Normanton	United Kingdom – Cheshire East	Conservative Party	ED	17 July 1979	23 July 1984	
Harrij Notenboom	Netherlands	Christian Democratic Appeal	EPP	17 July 1979	23 July 1984	
Charles-Ferdinand Nothomb	Belgium – French-speaking	Christian Social Party	EPP	17 July 1979	18 May 1980	
Kai Nyborg	Denmark	Progress Party (Note: Until 23 October 1983)	EPD	17 July 1979	23 July 1984	
Kai Nyborg	Denmark	Conservative People's Party (Note: Since 23 October 1983)	EPD	17 July 1979	23 July 1984	
John O'Connell	Ireland – Dublin	Labour Party	SOC	17 July 1979	10 September 1981	
Tom O'Donnell	Ireland – Munster	Fine Gael	EPP	17 July 1979	23 July 1984	
Jean Oehler	France	Socialist Party	SOC	17 July 1979	1 November 1981	
Charles O'Hagan	United Kingdom – Devon	Conservative Party	ED	17 July 1979	23 July 1984	
Michael O'Leary	Ireland – Dublin	Labour Party	SOC	17 July 1979	30 June 1981	
Kjeld Olesen	Denmark	Social Democrats	SOC	17 July 1979	31 October 1979	
Flor O'Mahony	Ireland – Dublin	Labour Party	SOC	2 March 1983	23 July 1984	
Flavio Orlandi	Italy	Democratic Socialist Party	SOC	17 July 1979	23 July 1984	
Olivier d'Ormesson	France	Union for French Democracy	EPP	17 July 1979	23 July 1984	
Aristidis Ouzounidis	Greece	Socialist Movement	SOC	9 June 1983	23 July 1984	
Ian Paisley	United Kingdom – Northern Ireland	Democratic Unionist Party	NI	17 July 1979	23 July 1984	
Giancarlo Pajetta	Italy	Communist Party	COM	17 July 1979	23 July 1984	
Marco Pannella	Italy	Radical Party	TGI	17 July 1979	23 July 1984	
Konstantina Pantazi	Greece	Socialist Movement	SOC	2 November 1981	23 July 1984	
Efstratios Papaefstratiou	Greece	New Democracy	NI	1 January 1981	18 October 1981	
Efstratios Papaefstratiou	Greece	New Democracy	EPP	2 November 1981	23 July 1984	
Apostolos Papageorgiou	Greece	Progressive Party	NI	2 November 1981	9 September 1982	
Yiannos Papantoniou	Greece	Socialist Movement	SOC	2 November 1981	23 July 1984	
Giovanni Papapietro	Italy	Communist Party	COM	17 July 1979	23 July 1984	
Ben Patterson	United Kingdom – Kent West	Conservative Party	ED	17 July 1979	23 July 1984	
Séamus Pattison	Ireland – Leinster	Labour Party	SOC	9 July 1981	15 December 1983	
René Paulhan	France	Defense of French Interests in Europe	EPD	16 December 1981	9 March 1983	
Jeanne Pauwelyn	Belgium – Dutch-speaking	Party for Freedom and Progress	ELDR	17 December 1981	23 July 1984	
Andrew Pearce	United Kingdom – Cheshire West	Conservative Party	ED	17 July 1979	23 July 1984	
Mario Pedini	Italy	Christian Democracy	EPP	17 July 1979	23 July 1984	
Jiří Pelikán	Italy	Socialist Party	SOC	17 July 1979	23 July 1984	
Jean Penders	Netherlands	Christian Democratic Appeal	EPP	17 July 1979	23 July 1984	
Anastassios Peponis	Greece	Socialist Movement	SOC	1 January 1981	18 October 1981	
Daniel Percheron	France	Socialist Party	SOC	17 July 1979	1 January 1984	
Nicole Péry	France	Socialist Party	SOC	17 September 1981	23 July 1984	
Yiangos Pesmazoglou	Greece	Party of Democratic Socialism	NI	1 January 1981	18 October 1981	
Yiangos Pesmazoglou	Greece	Party of Democratic Socialism	NI	2 November 1981	23 July 1984	
Johannes Wilhelm Peters	West Germany	Social Democratic Party	SOC	17 July 1979	23 July 1984	
Eggert Petersen	Denmark	Social Democrats	SOC	9 October 1980	23 July 1984	
Francesco Petronio	Italy	Social Movement	NI	17 July 1979	23 July 1984	
Gero Pfennig	West Germany	Christian Democratic Union	EPP	17 July 1979	23 July 1984	
Pierre Pflimlin	France	Union for French Democracy	EPP	17 July 1979	23 July 1984	
Alphonsine Phlix	Belgium – Dutch-speaking	Christian People's Party	EPP	17 December 1981	23 July 1984	
Flaminio Piccoli	Italy	Christian Democracy	EPP	17 July 1979	23 July 1984	
Sergio Pininfarina	Italy	Liberal Party	ELDR	17 July 1979	23 July 1984	
Jean-François Pintat	France	Union for French Democracy	ELDR	17 July 1979	23 July 1984	
René-Émile Piquet	France	Communist Party	COM	17 July 1979	23 July 1984	
Edgard Pisani	France	Socialist Party	SOC	24 October 1979	25 May 1981	
Spyridon Plaskovitis	Greece	Socialist Movement	SOC	1 January 1981	18 October 1981	
Spyridon Plaskovitis	Greece	Socialist Movement	SOC	2 November 1981	23 July 1984	
Henry Plumb	United Kingdom – Cotswolds	Conservative Party	ED	17 July 1979	23 July 1984	
Henriette Poirier	France	Communist Party	COM	17 July 1979	23 July 1984	
Christian Poncelet	France	Defense of French Interests in Europe	EPD	17 July 1979	30 September 1980	
Michel Poniatowski	France	Union for French Democracy	ELDR	17 July 1979	23 July 1984	
Emmanuil Poniridis	Greece	Socialist Movement	SOC	24 November 1981	3 June 1983	
Hans-Gert Pöttering	West Germany	Christian Democratic Union	EPP	17 July 1979	23 July 1984	
Derek Prag	United Kingdom – Hertfordshire	Conservative Party	ED	17 July 1979	23 July 1984	
Pierre-Benjamin Pranchere	France	Communist Party	COM	17 July 1979	23 July 1984	
Peter Price	United Kingdom – Lancashire West	Conservative Party	ED	17 July 1979	23 July 1984	
Michail Protopapadakis	Greece	New Democracy	EPP	2 November 1981	23 July 1984	
Christopher Prout	United Kingdom – Salop and Stafford	Conservative Party	ED	17 July 1979	23 July 1984	
James Provan	United Kingdom – North East Scotland	Conservative Party	ED	17 July 1979	23 July 1984	
Marie-Jane Pruvot	France	Union for French Democracy	ELDR	17 July 1979	23 July 1984	
Ruggero Puletti	Italy	Democratic Socialist Party	SOC	17 July 1979	23 July 1984	
Albert Pürsten	West Germany	Christian Democratic Union	EPP	17 July 1979	10 June 1980	
John Purvis	United Kingdom – Mid Scotland and Fife	Conservative Party	ED	17 July 1979	23 July 1984	
Joyce Quin	United Kingdom – Tyne South and Wear	Labour Party	SOC	17 July 1979	23 July 1984	
Renate-Charlotte Rabbethge	West Germany	Christian Democratic Union	EPP	17 July 1979	23 July 1984	
Lucien Radoux	Belgium – French-speaking	Socialist Party	SOC	17 July 1979	23 July 1984	
Eugène Remilly	France	Defense of French Interests in Europe	EPD	17 July 1979	23 July 1984	
Jean Rey	Belgium – French-speaking	Liberal Reformist Party	ELDR	17 July 1979	10 July 1980	
Brandon Rhys-Williams	United Kingdom – London South East	Conservative Party	ED	17 July 1979	23 July 1984	
Martin Rieger	West Germany	Social Democratic Party	SOC	13 November 1980	23 July 1984	
Günter Rinsche	West Germany	Christian Democratic Union	EPP	17 July 1979	23 July 1984	
Carlo Ripa di Meana	Italy	Socialist Party	SOC	17 July 1979	23 July 1984	
Hector Rivierez	France	Defense of French Interests in Europe	EPD	19 November 1983	23 July 1984	
Shelagh Roberts	United Kingdom – London South West	Conservative Party	ED	20 September 1979	23 July 1984	
Dieter Rogalla	West Germany	Social Democratic Party	SOC	30 September 1981	23 July 1984	
Allan Rogers	United Kingdom – Wales South East	Labour Party	SOC	17 July 1979	23 July 1984	
Hector Rolland	France	Defense of French Interests in Europe	EPD	1 October 1983	23 July 1984	
Pino Romualdi	Italy	Social Movement	NI	17 July 1979	23 July 1984	
André Rossi	France	Union for French Democracy	ELDR	17 July 1979	23 July 1984	
Yvette Roudy	France	Socialist Party	SOC	17 July 1979	16 June 1981	
Giorgio Ruffolo	Italy	Socialist Party	SOC	17 July 1979	30 September 1983	
Mariano Rumor	Italy	Christian Democracy	EPP	17 July 1979	23 July 1984	
Richie Ryan	Ireland – Dublin	Fine Gael	EPP	17 July 1979	23 July 1984	
Victor Sablé	France	Union for French Democracy	ELDR	17 July 1979	23 July 1984	
Henri Saby	France	Socialist Party	SOC	17 June 1981	23 July 1984	
Heinke Salisch	West Germany	Social Democratic Party	SOC	17 July 1979	23 July 1984	
Evanghelos Soussouroyannis	Greece	New Democracy	NI	1 January 1981	18 October 1981	
Bernhard Sälzer	West Germany	Christian Democratic Union	EPP	17 July 1979	23 July 1984	
Jacques Santer	Luxembourg	Christian Social People's Party	EPP	17 July 1979	18 July 1979	
Georges Sarre	France	Socialist Party	SOC	17 July 1979	17 September 1981	
Mario Sassano	Italy	Christian Democracy	EPP	17 July 1979	1 January 1984	
Casimir Johannes, Prince of Sayn-Wittgenstein-Berleburg	West Germany	Christian Democratic Union	EPP	17 July 1979	1 January 1984	
Marie-Claire Scamaroni	France	Defense of French Interests in Europe	EPD	11 March 1983	23 July 1984	
Wolfgang Schall	West Germany	Christian Democratic Union	EPP	17 July 1979	23 July 1984	
Rudolf Schieler	West Germany	Social Democratic Party	SOC	17 July 1979	23 July 1984	
Dieter Schinzel	West Germany	Social Democratic Party	SOC	17 July 1979	23 July 1984	
Ursula Schleicher	West Germany	Christian Social Union	EPP	17 July 1979	23 July 1984	
Gerhard Schmid	West Germany	Social Democratic Party	SOC	17 July 1979	23 July 1984	
Heinz Schmitt	West Germany	Social Democratic Party	SOC	17 July 1979	30 October 1980	
Paul Schnitker	West Germany	Christian Democratic Union	EPP	17 July 1979	23 July 1984	
Karl Schön	West Germany	Social Democratic Party	SOC	17 July 1979	23 July 1984	
Konrad Schön	West Germany	Christian Democratic Union	EPP	17 July 1979	23 July 1984	
Roger-Gérard Schwartzenberg	France	Radical Party of the Left	SOC	17 July 1979	23 March 1983	
Olaf Schwencke	West Germany	Social Democratic Party	SOC	17 July 1979	23 July 1984	
Leonardo Sciascia	Italy	Radical Party	TGI	17 July 1979	24 September 1979	
James Scott-Hopkins	United Kingdom – Hereford & Worcester	Conservative Party	ED	17 July 1979	23 July 1984	
Christiane Scrivener	France	Union for French Democracy	ELDR	17 July 1979	23 July 1984	
Barry Seal	United Kingdom – Yorkshire West	Labour Party	SOC	17 July 1979	23 July 1984	
Horst Seefeld	West Germany	Social Democratic Party	SOC	17 July 1979	23 July 1984	
Hans-Joachim Seeler	West Germany	Social Democratic Party	SOC	17 July 1979	23 July 1984	
Sergio Camillo Segre	Italy	Communist Party	COM	17 July 1979	23 July 1984	
Lieselotte Seibel-Emmerling	West Germany	Social Democratic Party	SOC	17 July 1979	23 July 1984	
Jean Seitlinger	France	Union for French Democracy	EPP	17 July 1979	23 July 1984	
Richard Seligman	United Kingdom – Sussex West	Conservative Party	ED	17 July 1979	23 July 1984	
Alexander Sherlock	United Kingdom – Essex South West	Conservative Party	ED	17 July 1979	23 July 1984	
Hellmut Sieglerschmidt	West Germany	Social Democratic Party	SOC	17 July 1979	23 July 1984	
Richard Simmonds	United Kingdom – Midlands West	Conservative Party	ED	17 July 1979	23 July 1984	
Maurice-René Simonnet	France	Union for French Democracy	EPP	17 July 1979	23 July 1984	
Anthony Simpson	United Kingdom – Northamptonshire	Conservative Party	ED	17 July 1979	23 July 1984	
Sven Skovmand	Denmark	People's Movement against the EEC	TGI	17 July 1979	23 July 1984	
Antoinette Spaak	Belgium – French-speaking	Democratic Front of the Francophones	NI	17 July 1979	23 July 1984	
Jean Spautz	Luxembourg	Christian Social People's Party	EPP	19 July 1979	5 March 1980	
Tom Spencer	United Kingdom – Derbyshire	Conservative Party	ED	17 July 1979	23 July 1984	
James Spicer	United Kingdom – Wessex	Conservative Party	ED	17 July 1979	23 July 1984	
Altiero Spinelli	Italy	Communist Party (Independent)	COM	17 July 1979	23 July 1984	
Vera Squarcialupi	Italy	Communist Party (Independent)	COM	17 July 1979	23 July 1984	
Carlo Stella	Italy	Christian Democracy	EPP	5 January 1982	23 July 1984	
Jack Stewart-Clark	United Kingdom – Sussex East	Conservative Party	ED	17 July 1979	23 July 1984	
Giorgio Strehler	Italy	Socialist Party	SOC	26 September 1983	23 July 1984	
Georges Sutra	France	Socialist Party	SOC	17 July 1979	23 July 1984	
Hughes Tatilon	France	Defense of French Interests in Europe	EPD	27 May 1983	24 July 1983	
John Taylor	United Kingdom – Northern Ireland	Ulster Unionist Party	ED	17 July 1979	23 July 1984	
John Taylor	United Kingdom – Midlands East	Conservative Party	ED	17 July 1979	23 July 1984	
Bernard Thareau	France	Socialist Party	SOC	17 June 1981	23 July 1984	
Yvonne Théobald-Paoli	France	Socialist Party	SOC	16 July 1981	23 July 1984	
Gaston Thorn	Luxembourg	Democratic Party	ELDR	17 July 1979	19 July 1979	
Leo Tindemans	Belgium – Dutch-speaking	Christian People's Party	EPP	17 July 1979	17 December 1981	
Teun Tolman	Netherlands	Christian Democratic Appeal	EPP	17 July 1979	23 July 1984	
Giovanni Travaglini	Italy	Christian Democracy	EPP	17 July 1979	23 July 1984	
Seán Treacy	Ireland – Munster	Labour Party	SOC	9 July 1981	23 July 1984	
Frederick Tuckman	United Kingdom – Leicester	Conservative Party	ED	17 July 1979	23 July 1984	
André Turcat	France	Defense of French Interests in Europe	EPD	13 October 1980	18 September 1981	
Amédée Turner	United Kingdom – Suffolk	Conservative Party	ED	17 July 1979	23 July 1984	
Alan Tyrrell	United Kingdom – London East	Conservative Party	ED	17 July 1979	23 July 1984	
Karel Van Miert	Belgium – Dutch-speaking	Socialist Party	SOC	17 July 1979	23 July 1984	
Eric Van Rompuy	Belgium – Dutch-speaking	Christian People's Party	EPP	28 August 1981	23 July 1984	
Jaak Vandemeulebroucke	Belgium – Dutch-speaking	People's Union	TGI	12 February 1981	23 July 1984	
Herman Vanderpoorten	Belgium – Dutch-speaking	Party for Freedom and Progress	ELDR	17 July 1979	21 May 1980	
Marcel Vandewiele	Belgium – Dutch-speaking	Christian People's Party	EPP	17 July 1979	23 July 1984	
Paul Vankerkhoven	Belgium			9 November 1982	23 July 1984	
Peter Vanneck	United Kingdom – Cleveland	Conservative Party	ED	17 July 1979	23 July 1984	
Mihail Vardakas	Greece	New Democracy	NI	1 January 1981	18 October 1981	
Marie-Claude Vayssade	France	Socialist Party	SOC	17 July 1979	23 July 1984	
Simone Veil	France	Union for French Democracy	ELDR	17 July 1979	23 July 1984	
Wim Vergeer	Netherlands	Christian Democratic Appeal	EPP	17 July 1979	23 July 1984	
Paul Vergès	France	Communist Party	COM	17 July 1979	23 July 1984	
Joris Verhaegen	Belgium – Dutch-speaking	Christian People's Party	EPP	17 July 1979	25 August 1981	
Willy Vernimmen	Belgium – Dutch-speaking	Socialist Party	SOC	17 July 1979	23 July 1984	
Protogene Veronesi	Italy	Christian Democracy	EPP	26 July 1979	23 July 1984	
Jan Verroken	Belgium – Dutch-speaking	Christian People's Party	EPP	17 July 1979	23 July 1984	
Heinz Oskar Vetter	West Germany	Social Democratic Party	SOC	17 July 1979	23 July 1984	
Nikolaos Vgenopoulos	Greece	Socialist Movement	SOC	2 November 1981	23 July 1984	
Themistokles Visas	Greece	New Democracy	NI	1 January 1981	18 October 1981	
Daniel Vié	France	Defense of French Interests in Europe	EPD	13 October 1980	23 July 1984	
Phili Viehoff	Netherlands	Labour Party	SOC	29 November 1979	23 July 1984	
Bruno Visentini	Italy	Republican Party	ELDR	17 July 1979	4 August 1983	
Giuseppe Vitale	Italy	Communist Party	COM	24 June 1980	23 July 1984	
Dimitrios Vlahopoulos	Greece	New Democracy	NI	1 January 1981	18 October 1981	
Anne Vondeling	Netherlands	Labour Party	SOC	17 July 1979	22 November 1979	
Georgios Voyadzis	Greece	New Democracy	NI	1 January 1981	18 October 1981	
Thomas von der Vring	West Germany	Social Democratic Party	SOC	17 July 1979	23 July 1984	
Manfred Wagner	West Germany	Social Democratic Party	SOC	17 July 1979	23 July 1984	
Gerd Walter	West Germany	Social Democratic Party	SOC	17 July 1979	23 July 1984	
Hanna Walz	West Germany	Christian Democratic Union	EPP	17 July 1979	23 July 1984	
Frederick Warner	United Kingdom – Somerset	Conservative Party	ED	17 July 1979	23 July 1984	
Kurt Wawrzik	West Germany	Christian Democratic Union	EPP	17 July 1979	23 July 1984	
Beate Weber	West Germany	Social Democratic Party	SOC	17 July 1979	23 July 1984	
Rudolf Wedekind	West Germany	Christian Democratic Union	EPP	17 February 1981	23 July 1984	
Louise Weiss	France	Defense of French Interests in Europe	EPD	17 July 1979	26 May 1983	
Charles Wellesley	United Kingdom – Surrey	Conservative Party	ED	17 July 1979	23 July 1984	
Michael Welsh	United Kingdom – Lancashire Central	Conservative Party	ED	17 July 1979	23 July 1984	
Klaus Wettig	West Germany	Social Democratic Party	SOC	17 July 1979	23 July 1984	
Heidemarie Wieczorek-Zeul	West Germany	Social Democratic Party	SOC	17 July 1979	23 July 1984	
Karl von Wogau	West Germany	Christian Democratic Union	EPP	17 July 1979	23 July 1984	
Jean Wolter	Luxembourg	Christian Social People's Party	EPP	17 July 1979	18 July 1979	
Eisso Woltjer	Netherlands	Labour Party	SOC	17 July 1979	23 July 1984	
Francis Wurtz	France	Communist Party	COM	17 July 1979	23 July 1984	
Benigno Zaccagnini	Italy	Christian Democracy	EPP	17 July 1979	27 November 1981	
Mario Zagari	Italy	Socialist Party	SOC	17 July 1979	23 July 1984	
Nikos Zardinidis	Greece	New Democracy	NI	1 January 1981	18 October 1981	
Axel Zarges	West Germany	Christian Democratic Union	EPP	1 January 1984	23 July 1984	
Ortensio Zecchino	Italy	Christian Democracy	EPP	17 July 1979	23 July 1984	
Ioannis Ziagas	Greece	Socialist Movement	SOC	6 July 1982	23 July 1984	
Ioannis Zighdis	Greece	Union of the Democratic Centre	NI	1 January 1981	18 October 1981	

== See also ==
- Member of the European Parliament
- 1979 European Parliament election
- MEPs for Belgium 1979–1984
- MEPs for Denmark 1979–1984
- MEPs for France 1979–1984
- MEPs for Greece 1981–1984
  - MEPs for Greece 1981 (delegation)
- MEPs for Germany 1979–1984
- MEPs for Ireland 1979–1984
- MEPs for Italy 1979–1984
- MEPs for Luxembourg 1979–1984
- List of members of the European Parliament for the Netherlands, 1979–1984
- MEPs for the UK 1979–1984
