= List of members of the European Parliament for Italy, 1979–1984 =

Members of the European Parliament for Italy
ECSC delegation	(1952)
EP delegation	(1958)
1st term	(1979)
2nd term	(1984)
3rd term	(1989)
4th term	(1994)
5th term	(1999)
6th term	(2004)
7th term	(2009)
8th term	(2014)
9th term	(2019)
10th term	(2024)

This is a list of the 81 members of the European Parliament for Italy in the 1979 to 1984 session.

== List ==
Name	National party	EP Group
Pietro Adonnino	Christian Democracy	EPP
Dario Antoniozzi	Christian Democracy	EPP
Giovanni Barbagli	Christian Democracy	EPP
Paolo Barbi	Christian Democracy	EPP
Giovanni Bersani	Christian Democracy	EPP
Maria Luisa Cassanmagnago Cerretti	Christian Democracy	EPP
Arnaldo Colleselli	Christian Democracy	EPP
Emilio Colombo	Christian Democracy	EPP
Roberto Costanzo	Christian Democracy	EPP
Alfredo Diana	Christian Democracy	EPP
Renzo Eligio Filippi	Christian Democracy	EPP
Paola Gaiotti de Biase	Christian Democracy	EPP
Alberto Ghergo	Christian Democracy	EPP
Giovanni Giavazzi	Christian Democracy	EPP
Vincenzo Giummarra	Christian Democracy	EPP
Guido Gonella	Christian Democracy	EPP
Silvio Lega	Christian Democracy	EPP
Giosuè Ligios	Christian Democracy	EPP
Salvatore Lima	Christian Democracy	EPP
Luigi Macario	Christian Democracy	EPP
Angelo Narducci	Christian Democracy	EPP
Mario Pedini	Christian Democracy	EPP
Flaminio Piccoli	Christian Democracy	EPP
Mariano Rumor	Christian Democracy	EPP
Mario Sassano	Christian Democracy	EPP
Giovanni Travaglini	Christian Democracy	EPP
Benigno Zaccagnini	Christian Democracy	EPP
Ortensio Zecchino	Christian Democracy	EPP
	Christian Democracy	EPP
Joachim Dalsass	People's Party (South Tyrol)	EPP
Giorgio Amendola	Communist Party	COM
Carla Barbarella	Communist Party	COM
Enrico Berlinguer	Communist Party	COM
Aldo Bonaccini	Communist Party	COM
Umberto Cardia	Communist Party	COM
Angelo Carossino	Communist Party	COM
Domenico Ceravolo	Communist Party	COM
Maria Lisa Cinciari Rodano	Communist Party	COM
Francescopaolo D'Angelosante	Communist Party	COM
Pancrazio De Pasquale	Communist Party	COM
Guido Fanti	Communist Party	COM
Bruno Ferrero	Communist Party	COM
Carlo Alberto Galluzzi	Communist Party	COM
Anselmo Gouthier	Communist Party	COM
Leonilde Iotti	Communist Party	COM
Silvio Leonardi	Communist Party	COM
Giancarlo Pajetta	Communist Party	COM
Giovanni Papapietro	Communist Party	COM
Sergio Camillo Segre	Communist Party	COM
Maria Fabrizia Baduel Glorioso	Communist Party (Independent)	COM
Tullia Carettoni Romagnoli	Communist Party (Independent)	COM
Felice Ippolito	Communist Party (Independent)	COM
Altiero Spinelli	Communist Party (Independent)	COM
Vera Squarcialupi	Communist Party (Independent)	COM
Gaetano Arfé	Socialist Party	SOC
Bettino Craxi	Socialist Party	SOC
Mario Dido'	Socialist Party	SOC
Vincenzo Gatto	Socialist Party	SOC
Pietro Lezzi	Socialist Party	SOC
Jiri Pelikan	Socialist Party	SOC
Carlo Ripa di Meana	Socialist Party	SOC
Giorgio Ruffolo	Socialist Party	SOC
Mario Zagari	Socialist Party	SOC
Antonio Cariglia	Democratic Socialist Party	SOC
Mauro Ferri	Democratic Socialist Party	SOC
Flavio Orlandi	Democratic Socialist Party	SOC
Ruggero Puletti	Democratic Socialist Party	SOC
Vincenzo Bettiza	Liberal Party	LD
Domenico Cecovini	Liberal Party	LD
Sergio Pininfarina	Liberal Party	LD
Susanna Agnelli	Republican Party	LD
Bruno Visentini	Republican Party	LD
Emma Bonino	Radical Party	TGI
Marco Pannella	Radical Party	TGI
Leonardo Sciascia	Radical Party	TGI
Mario Capanna	Proletarian Democracy	TGI
Luciana Castellina	Proletarian Unity Party	TGI
Giorgio Almirante	Social Movement	NI
Antonino Buttafuoco	Social Movement	NI
Francesco Petronio	Social Movement	NI
Pino Romualdi	Social Movement	NI
