= List of members of the European Parliament for Italy, 1984–1989 =

Members of the European Parliament for Italy
ECSC delegation	(1952)
EP delegation	(1958)
1st term	(1979)
2nd term	(1984)
3rd term	(1989)
4th term	(1994)
5th term	(1999)
6th term	(2004)
7th term	(2009)
8th term	(2014)
9th term	(2019)
10th term	(2024)

This is a list of the 81 members of the European Parliament for Italy in the 1984 to 1989 session.

== List ==
Name	National party	EP Group
Carla Barbarella	Communist Party	COM
Roberto Barzanti	Communist Party	COM
Aldo Bonaccini	Communist Party	COM
Angelo Carossino	Communist Party	COM
Luciana Castellina	Communist Party	COM
Giovanni Cervetti	Communist Party	COM
Maria Lisa Cinciari Rodano	Communist Party	COM
Pancrazio De Pasquale	Communist Party	COM
Guido Fanti	Communist Party	COM
Carlo Alberto Galluzzi	Communist Party	COM
Natalino Gatti	Communist Party	COM
Francesca Marinaro	Communist Party	COM
Alberto Moravia	Communist Party	COM
Alessandro Natta	Communist Party	COM
Diego Novelli	Communist Party	COM
Giancarlo Pajetta	Communist Party	COM
Giovanni Papapietro	Communist Party	COM
Andrea Raggio	Communist Party	COM
Alfrefo Reichlin	Communist Party	COM
Giorgio Rossetti	Communist Party	COM
Sergio Camillo Segre	Communist Party	COM
Renzo Trivelli	Communist Party	COM
Osvalda Trupia	Communist Party	COM
Maurizio Valenzi	Communist Party	COM
Felice Ippolito	Communist Party (Independent)	COM
Altiero Spinelli	Communist Party (Independent)	COM
Vera Squarcialupi	Communist Party (Independent)	COM
Dario Antoniozzi	Christian Democracy	EPP
Giovanni Bersani	Christian Democracy	EPP
Franco Borgo	Christian Democracy	EPP
Carlo Casini	Christian Democracy	EPP
Maria Luisa Cassanmagnago Cerretti	Christian Democracy	EPP
Mauro Chiabrando	Christian Democracy	EPP
Vittorino Chiusano	Christian Democracy	EPP
Michelangelo Ciancaglini	Christian Democracy	EPP
Roberto Costanzo	Christian Democracy	EPP
Luigi Ciriaco De Mita	Christian Democracy	EPP
Sergio Ercini	Christian Democracy	EPP
Roberto Formigoni	Christian Democracy	EPP
Gerardo Gaibisso	Christian Democracy	EPP
Giovanni Giavazzi	Christian Democracy	EPP
Vincenzo Giummarra	Christian Democracy	EPP
Antonio Iodice	Christian Democracy	EPP
Giosuè Ligios	Christian Democracy	EPP
Salvatore Lima	Christian Democracy	EPP
Alberto Michelini	Christian Democracy	EPP
Alfeo Mizzau	Christian Democracy	EPP
Eolo Parodi	Christian Democracy	EPP
Ferruccio Pisoni	Christian Democracy	EPP
Nino Pisoni	Christian Democracy	EPP
Mario Pomilio	Christian Democracy	EPP
Gustavo Selva	Christian Democracy	EPP
Giovanni Starita	Christian Democracy	EPP
Gianni Baget Bozzo	Socialist Party	SOC
Mario Dido'	Socialist Party	SOC
Anselmo Guarraci	Socialist Party	SOC
Claudio Martelli	Socialist Party	SOC
Vincenzo Mattina	Socialist Party	SOC
Jiri Pelikan	Socialist Party	SOC
Mario Rigo	Socialist Party	SOC
Carlo Tognoli	Socialist Party	SOC
Mario Zagari	Socialist Party	SOC
Vincenzo Bettiza	Liberal Party–Republican Party	LD
Mario Di Bartolomei	Liberal Party–Republican Party	LD
Jas Gawronski	Liberal Party–Republican Party	LD
Sergio Pininfarina	Liberal Party–Republican Party	LD
Rosario Romeo	Liberal Party–Republican Party	LD
Giorgio Almirante	Social Movement	ER
Antonino Buttafuoco	Social Movement	ER
Francesco Petronio	Social Movement	ER
Pino Romualdi	Social Movement	ER
Antonino Tripodi	Social Movement	ER
Giuseppe Amadei	Democratic Socialist Party	SOC
Renato Massari	Democratic Socialist Party	SOC
Giovanni Moroni	Democratic Socialist Party	SOC
Emma Bonino	Radical Party	NI
Marco Pannella	Radical Party	NI
Enzo Tortora	Radical Party	NI
Joachim Dalsass	South Tyrolean People's Party	EPP
Emilio Molinari	Proletarian Democracy	RBW
Michele Columbu	Sardinian Action Party–Valdostan Union	RBW

=== Party representation ===
National party	EP Group	Seats	±
Communist Party	COM	27	▲3
Christian Democracy	EPP	26	▼3
Socialist Party	SOC	9	Steady
Social Movement	ER	5	▲1
Liberal Party–Republican Party	LD	5	Steady
Democratic Socialist Party	SOC	3	▼1
Radical Party	NI	3	Steady
Proletarian Democracy	RG	1	Steady
South Tyrolean People's Party	EPP	1	Steady
Sardinian Action Party–Valdostan Union	RG	1	▲1
