= List of members of the European Parliament for Italy, 2004–2009 =

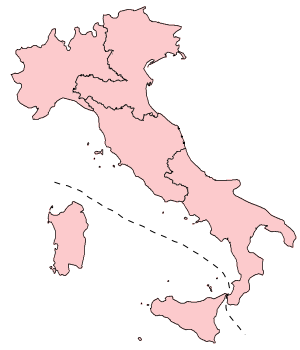
The five constituencies for European elections

Members of the European Parliament for Italy
ECSC delegation	(1952)
EP delegation	(1958)
1st term	(1979)
2nd term	(1984)
3rd term	(1989)
4th term	(1994)
5th term	(1999)
6th term	(2004)
7th term	(2009)
8th term	(2014)
9th term	(2019)
10th term	(2024)

This is a list of the 78 members of the European Parliament for Italy in the 2004 to 2009 session.

The names in dark blue are MEPs that had already been elected in the European Parliament.

== List ==
Name	National party	EP Group	Constituency
Agnoletto Vittorio	Communist Refoundation Party	EUL–NGL	North-West
Albertini Gabriele	Forza Italia	EPP–ED	North-West
Bonsignore Vito	Union of Christian and Centre Democrats	EPP–ED	North-West
Chiesa Giulietto	Italy of Values	ELDR	North-West
Fatuzzo Carlo	Pensioners' Party	EPP–ED	North-West
Ferrari Francesco	United in the Olive Tree (until 6 February 2008) Democratic Party	ELDR	North-West
Frassoni Monica	Federation of the Greens	G–EFA	North-West
Gawronski Jas	Forza Italia	EPP–ED	North-West
Locatelli Pia Elda	United in the Olive Tree (until 17 February 2005) Italian Democratic Socialists (10 February 2008) Italian Socialist Party	PES	North-West
Mantovani Mario	Forza Italia	EPP–ED	North-West
Mauro Mario	Forza Italia	EPP–ED	North-West
Pannella Marco	Bonino List	ELDR	North-West
Panzeri Pier Antonio	United in the Olive Tree (until 14 February 2005) Democrats of the Left (until 18 February 2008) Democratic Party	PES	North-West
Podestà Guido	Forza Italia	EPP–ED	North-West
Rizzo Marco	Party of Communists	EUL–NGL	North-West
Rivera Giovanni	United in the Olive Tree (until 14 February 2008) Popular Civic Federative Movement (Until 10 March 2008) United in the Olive Tree	NI	North-West
Susta Gianluca	United in the Olive Tree (until 15 May 2006) The Daisy (until 6 February 2008) Democratic Party	ELDR	North-West
Toia Patrizia	The Daisy (until 6 February 2008) Democratic Party	ELDR	North-West
Berlinguer Giovanni	Democrats of the Left (until 18 February 2008) Democratic Left	PES	North-East
Borghezio Mario	Northern League	IND&DEM (until 26 April 2006) NI (until 12 December 2006) UEN	North-West
Speroni Francesco	Northern League	IND&DEM (until 26 April 2006) NI (until 12 December 2006) UEN	North-West
Muscardini Cristina	National Alliance	UEN	North-West
La Russa Romano Maria (until 3 November 2008)	National Alliance	UEN	North-West
Berlato Sergio	National Alliance	UEN	North-East
Bossi Umberto (until 28 April 2008) Robusti Giovanni (from 30 May 2008)	Northern League (until 25 June 2008) Independent	IND&DEM (until 26 April 2006) NI (until 12 December 2006) UEN	North-East
Salvini Matteo (until 7 November 2006) Gobbo Gian Paolo (from 8 November 2006 to 22 June 2008) Boso Erminio (from 23 June 2008)	Northern League	IND&DEM (until 26 April 2006) NI (until 12 December 2006) UEN	North-East
Braghetto Iles	Union of Christian and Centre Democrats	EPP–ED	North-East
Brunetta Renato	Forza Italia	EPP–ED	North-East
Cappato Marco (from 8 May 2006)	Bonino List	ELDR	North-East
Carollo Giorgio	Forza Italia	EPP–ED	North-East
Costa Paolo	United in the Olive Tree (until 17 February 2005) The Daisy (until 6 February 2008) Democratic Party	ELDR	North-East
Ebner Michl	People's Party (South Tyrol)	EPP–ED	North-East
Gottardi Donata	United in the Olive Tree (until 30 May 2006) The Daisy (until 6 February 2008) Democratic Party	PES	North-East
Kusstatscher Sepp	Federation of the Greens	G–EFA	North-East
Musacchio Roberto	Communist Refoundation Party	EUL–NGL	North-East
Prodi Vittorio	United in the Olive Tree (until 17 February 2005) The Daisy (until 6 February 2008) Democratic Party	ELDR	North-East
Sartori Amalia	Forza Italia	EPP–ED	North-East
Zani Mauro	United in the Olive Tree (until 27 July 2004) Democrats of the Left (until 18 February 2008) Independent	PES	North-East
Antnazzi Alfredo	Forza Italia	EPP–ED	Central
Alessandro Battilocchio	New Socialist Party (until 18 February 2008) Socialist Party	Non-Inscrits (until 20 October 2007) PES	Central
Casini Carlo	Union of Christian and Centre Democrats	EPP–ED	Central
Gruber Lilli	Independent (until 18 February 2008) Democratic Party	PES	Central
Guidoni Umberto	Party of Communists	EUL–NGL	Central
Mrgantini Luisa	Communist Refoundation Party	EUL–NGL	Central
Mussolini Alessandra (until 28 April 2008) Roberto Fiore (from 16 May 2008)	Social Alternative (until 15 April 2009) New Force	Non-Inscrits (until 14 January 2007) ITS (until 13 November 2007) Non-Inscrits	Central
Napoletano Pasqualina	Democrats of the Left (until 18 February 2008) Democratic Left	PES	Central
Pistelli Lapo (until 28 April 2008)	The Daisy (until 6 February 2008) Democratic Party	ELDR	Central
Sacconi Guido	United in the Olive Tree (until 28 July 2004) Democrats of the Left (until 18 February 2008) Democratic Party	PES	Central
Sbarbati Luciana	United in the Olive Tree (until 17 February 2005) European Republicans Movement	ELDR	Central
Tajani Antonio	Forza Italia	EPP–ED	Central
Zappalà Stefano	Forza Italia	EPP–ED	Central
Zingaretti Nicola	Democrats of the Left (until 18 February 2008) Democratic Party	PES	Central
Aita Vincenzo	Communist Refoundation Party	EUL–NGL	Southern
Andria Alfonso	United in the Olive Tree (until 17 February 2005) The Daisy (until 6 February 2008) Democratic Party	ELDR	Southern
De Michelis Gianni	New Socialist Party (until 18 February 2008) Socialist Party	Non-Inscrits (until 23 October 2007) PES	Southern
Gargani Giuseppe	Forza Italia	EPP–ED	Southern
Lavarra Vincenzo (from 24 May 2005)	Democrats of the Left (until 18 February 2008) Democratic Party	PES	Southern
Losco Andrea	United in the Olive Tree (until 6 February 2008) Democratic Party	ELDR	Southern
Occhetto Achille	Italy of Values (until 17 May 2006) Independent (until 28 March 2007)	PES (until 28 March 2007)	Southern
Patriciello Aldo	Union of Christian and Centre Democrats	EPP–ED	Southern
Pittella Giovanni	United in the Olive Tree (until 17 February 2005) Democrats of the Left (until 18 February 2008) Democratic Party	PES	Southern
Foglietta Alessandro	National Alliance	UEN	Central
Pirilli Umberto	National Alliance	UEN	Southern
Angelilli Roberta	National Alliance	UEN	Central
Poli Bortone Adriana (until 28 April 2008)	National Alliance	UEN	Southern
Tatarella Salvatore	National Alliance	UEN	Southern
Musumeci Nello	National Alliance (19 September 2005) Sicilian Alliance (until 26 November 2007) The Right - Sicilian Alliance	UEN	Islands
Romagnoli Luca	Tricolour Flame	Non-Inscrits (until 14 January 2007) ITS (until 13 November 2007) Non-Inscrits	Southern
Ventre Riccardo	Forza Italia	EPP–ED	Southern
Veneto Armando	Popular Alliance - Union of Democrats for Europe (31 August 2008) Forza Italia	EPP–ED	Southern
Veraldi Donato Tommaso	United in the Olive Tree (until 14 May 2006) The Daisy (until 6 February 2008) Democratic Party	ELDR	Southern
Vernola Marcello	Forza Italia	EPP–ED	Southern
Castiglione Giuseppe	Forza Italia	EPP–ED	Islands
Catania Giusto	Communist Refoundation Party	EUL–NGL	Islands
Cocilovo Luigi	The Daisy (until 6 February 2008) Democratic Party	ELDR	Islands
Fava Claudio	Democrats of the Left (until 18 February 2008) Democratic Left	PES	Islands
Lombardo Raffaele	Movement for Autonomy	EPP–ED	Islands
Musotto Francesco	Forza Italia	EPP–ED	Islands

== Former members ==
Name	Constituency	Party Group
Pier Luigi Bersani	North-West	Party of European Socialists
Fausto Bertinotti	Southern	European United Left - Nordic Green Left
Emma Bonino	North-East	Alliance of Liberals and Democrats for Europe
Mercedes Bresso	North-West	Party of European Socialists
Lorenzo Cesa	Southern	European People's Party
Paolo Cirino Pomicino	Southern	European People's Party
Massimo D'Alema	Southern	Party of European Socialists
Antonio De Poli	North-East	European People's Party
Ottaviano Del Turco	Southern	Party of European Socialists
Antonio Di Pietro	Southern	Alliance of Liberals and Democrats for Europe
Armando Dionisi	Central	European People's Party
Enrico Letta	North-East	Alliance of Liberals and Democrats for Europe
Giovanni Procacci	Southern	Alliance of Liberals and Democrats for Europe
Matteo Salvini	North-West	Independence and Democracy
Michele Santoro	Southern	Party of European Socialists
