= List of members of the European Parliament for Italy, 1999–2004 =

Members of the European Parliament for Italy
ECSC delegation	(1952)
EP delegation	(1958)
1st term	(1979)
2nd term	(1984)
3rd term	(1989)
4th term	(1994)
5th term	(1999)
6th term	(2004)
7th term	(2009)
8th term	(2014)
9th term	(2019)
10th term	(2024)

This is a list of the 87 members of the European Parliament for Italy in the 1999 to 2004 session.

== List ==
Name	National party	EP Group
Generoso Andria	Forza Italia	EPP–ED
Roberta Angelilli	National Alliance	NI (until 21 July 1999) UEN
Paolo Bartolozzi	Forza Italia	EPP–ED
Sergio Berlato	National Alliance	NI (until 21 July 1999) UEN
Fausto Bertinotti	Communist Refoundation Party (Until 28 April 2004) Communist Refoundation Party - European Left	EUL–NGL
Roberto Felice Bigliardo	Tricolour Flame (until 4 September 2000) European Social Movement (until 31 May 2001) ³ National Alliance	TGI (until 30 September 2001) UEN
Guido Bodrato	Italian People's Party	EPP–ED
Emma Bonino	Bonino List	TGI (until 2 October 2001) NI
Mario Borghezio	Northern League	TGI (until 2 October 2001) NI
Enrico Boselli	Italian Democratic Socialists	PES
Giuseppe Brienza	Christian Democratic Centre (until 30 January 2003) United Christian Democrats	EPP–ED
Renato Brunetta	Forza Italia	EPP–ED
Marco Cappato	Bonino List	TGI (until 2 October 2001) NI
Massimo Carraro	Democrats of the Left	PES
Giorgio Celli	Federation of the Greens	G–EFA
Luigi Cesaro	Forza Italia	EPP–ED
Luigi Cocilovo	People's Party	EPP–ED
Armando Cossutta	Party of Italian Communists	EUL–NGL
Paolo Costa	The Democrats	ELDR
Raffaele Costa	Forza Italia	EPP–ED
Benedetto Della Vedova	Bonino List	TGI (until 2 October 2001) NI
Gianfranco Dell'alba	Bonino List	TGI (until 2 October 2001) NI
Marcello Dell'Utri	Forza Italia	EPP–ED
Luigi Ciriaco De Mita	People's Party	EPP–ED
Giuseppe Di Lello Finuoli	Communist Refoundation Party (Until 28 April 2004) Communist Refoundation Party - European Left	EUL–NGL
Antonio Di Pietro	The Democrats (13 June 2000) Italy of Values	ELDR
Massimo Cacciari (until 26 May 2000) Luciano Caveri (from 21 June 2000 until 7 July 2003) Giorgio Calò (from 3 September 2003)	The Democrats (until 26 May 2000) Valdostan Union (until 7 July 2003) Italy of Values	ELDR
Olivier Dupuis	Bonino List	TGI (until 2 October 2001) NI
Michl Ebner	South Tyrolean People's Party	EPP–ED
Carlo Fatuzzo	Pensioners' Party	EPP–ED
Claudio Fava	Democrats of the Left	PES
Enrico Ferri	Forza Italia	EPP–ED
Francesco Fiori	Forza Italia	EPP–ED
Marco Formentini	Northern League (20 March 2002) The Democrats	NI (4 October 1999) ELDR
Giuseppe Gargani	Forza Italia	EPP–ED
Jas Gawronski	Forza Italia	EPP–ED
Vitaliano Gemelli	Christian Democratic Centre (until 30 January 2003) United Christian Democrats	EPP–ED
Fiorella Ghilardotti	Democrats of the Left	PES
Gian Paolo Gobbo	Northern League	TGI (until 2 October 2001) NI
Renzo Imbeni	Democrats of the Left	PES
Vincenzo Lavarra	Democrats of the Left	PES
Giorgio Lisi	Forza Italia	EPP–ED
Raffaele Lombardo	Christian Democratic Centre (until 30 January 2003) United Christian Democrats	EPP–ED
Lucio Manisco	Party of Italian Communists	EUL–NGL
Mario Mantovani	Forza Italia	EPP–ED
Franco Marini	People's Party	EPP–ED
Claudio Martelli	Italian Democratic Socialists	PES (until 29 August 2000) NI (until 14 November 2000) TGI (until 2 October 2001) NI (until 6 March 2002) ELDR
Clemente Mastella	Union of Democrats for Europe	EPP–ED
Mario Mauro	Forza Italia	EPP–ED
Pietro Mennea	The Democrats (until 13 June 2000) Italy of Values (until 3 February 2002) Forza Italia (until 7 July 2003) Independent (until 26 October 2003) Liberali Democratici Europei (Italy)	ELDR (until 3 February 2002) EPP–ED (until 7 July 2003) NI
Domenico Mennitti	Forza Italia	EPP–ED
Reinhold Messner	Federation of the Greens	G–EFA
Luisa Morgantini	Communist Refoundation Party (Until 28 April 2004) Communist Refoundation Party - European Left	EUL–NGL
Cristiana Muscardini	National Alliance	NI (until 21 July 1999) UEN
Francesco Musotto	Forza Italia	EPP–ED
Antonio Mussa	National Alliance	UEN
Sebastiano Musumeci	National Alliance	NI (until 21 July 1999) UEN
Pasqualina Napoletano	Democrats of the Left	PES
Giorgio Napolitano	Democrats of the Left	PES
Giuseppe Nisticò	Forza Italia	EPP–ED
Mauro Nobilia	National Alliance	NI (until 21 July 1999) UEN
Elena Ornella Paciotti	Democrats of the Left	PES
Marco Pannella	Bonino List	TGI (until 2 October 2001) NI
Paolo Pastorelli	Christian Democratic Centre (until 30 January 2003) United Christian Democrats	EPP–ED
Giuseppe Pisicchio	Italian Renewal	EPP–ED
Giovanni Pittella	Democrats of the Left	PES
Guido Podestà	Forza Italia	EPP–ED
Adriana Poli Bortone	National Alliance	NI (until 21 July 1999) UEN
Giovanni Procacci	The Democrats	ELDR
Giorgio Ruffolo	Democrats of the Left	PES
Francesco Rutelli	The Democrats	ELDR
Guido Sacconi	Democrats of the Left	PES
Giacomo Santini	Forza Italia	EPP–ED
Amalia Sartori	Forza Italia	EPP–ED
Luciana Sbarbati	Italian Republican Party European Republicans Movement	ELDR
Umberto Scapagnini	Forza Italia	EPP–ED
Mariotto Segni	Segni Pact	NI (until 21 July 1999) UEN
Francesco Enrico Speroni	Northern League	TGI (until 2 October 2001) NI
Antonio Tajani	Forza Italia	EPP–ED
Bruno Trentin	Democrats of the Left	PES
Franz Turchi	National Alliance	NI (until 21 July 1999) UEN
Maurizio Turco	Bonino List	TGI (until 2 October 2001) NI
Gianni Vattimo	Democrats of the Left	PES
Walter Veltroni	Democrats of the Left	PES
Luigi Vinci	Communist Refoundation Party (Until 28 April 2004) Communist Refoundation Party - European Left	EUL–NGL
Demetrio Volcic	Democrats of the Left	PES
Stefano Zappalà	Forza Italia	EPP–ED
