= List of members of the European Parliament for Italy, 2024–2029 =

Members of the European Parliament for Italy
ECSC delegation	(1952)
EP delegation	(1958)
1st term	(1979)
2nd term	(1984)
3rd term	(1989)
4th term	(1994)
5th term	(1999)
6th term	(2004)
7th term	(2009)
8th term	(2014)
9th term	(2019)
10th term	(2024)

This is a list of the 76 members of the European Parliament for Italy in the Tenth European Parliament.

== List ==
=== Elected MEPs ===
MEP	Constituency	National party	EP Group	In office		Notes	Ref.
MEP	Constituency	National party	EP Group	Since	Until	Notes	Ref.
Carlo Fidanza	North-West Italy	FdI	ECR	2 July 2019 (Note: Fidanza also served as an MEP between 2009 and 2014; initially a member of The People of Freedom and the EPP group, he switched to Brothers of Italy and the ECR group in 2013.)			
Mario Mantovani	North-West Italy	FdI	ECR	16 July 2024 (Note: Mantovani also served as an MEP between 1999 and 2008; at the time, he was a member of Forza Italia and the EPP group.)			
Giovanni Crosetto	North-West Italy	FdI	ECR	16 July 2024			
Lara Magoni	North-West Italy	FdI	ECR	16 July 2024			
Pietro Fiocchi	North-West Italy	FdI	ECR	2 July 2019			
Mariateresa Vivaldini	North-West Italy	FdI	ECR	16 July 2024			
Paolo Inselvini	North-West Italy	FdI	ECR	16 July 2024		Elected after Giorgia Meloni refused to take her seat	
Elena Donazzan	North-East Italy	FdI	ECR	16 July 2024			
Stefano Cavedagna	North-East Italy	FdI	ECR	16 July 2024			
Sergio Berlato	North-East Italy	FdI	ECR	1 February 2020 (Note: Berlato also served as an MEP between 1999 and 2014; initially a member of National Alliance and the UEN group, he switched to The People of Freedom and the EPP group in 2009, and then joined Forza Italia in 2013.)			
Alessandro Ciriani	North-East Italy	FdI	ECR	16 July 2024			
Daniele Polato	North-East Italy	FdI	ECR	16 July 2024		Elected after Giorgia Meloni refused to take her seat	
Nicola Procaccini	Central Italy	FdI	ECR	2 July 2019		ECR co-chairman	
Marco Squarta	Central Italy	FdI	ECR	16 July 2024			
Carlo Ciccioli	Central Italy	FdI	ECR	16 July 2024			
Antonella Sberna	Central Italy	FdI	ECR	16 July 2024		Vice-President of the European Parliament	
Francesco Torselli	Central Italy	FdI	ECR	16 July 2024		Elected after Giorgia Meloni refused to take her seat	
Alberico Gambino	Southern Italy	FdI	ECR	16 July 2024			
Francesco Ventola	Southern Italy	FdI	ECR	16 July 2024			
Denis Nesci	Southern Italy	FdI	ECR	3 October 2022 (Note: Nesci became an MEP after Raffaele Fitto resigned from his role, having won a seat in the 2022 Italian general election.)			
Michele Picaro	Southern Italy	FdI	ECR	16 July 2024			
Chiara Maria Gemma	Southern Italy	FdI	ECR	2 July 2019 (Note: Gemma was a member of the Five Star Movement and the Non-Inscrits until 2023, when she switched to Brothers of Italy and the ECR group.)		Elected after Giorgia Meloni refused to take her seat	
Giuseppe Milazzo	Italian Islands	FdI	ECR	2 July 2019 (Note: Milazzo was a member of Forza Italia and the EPP group until 2021, when he switched to Brothers of Italy and the ECR group.)			
Ruggero Razza	Italian Islands	FdI	ECR	16 July 2024		Elected after Giorgia Meloni refused to take her seat	
Cecilia Strada	North-West Italy	PD (Ind.)	S&D	16 July 2024		PD 2024 list leader in North-West Italy	
Giorgio Gori	North-West Italy	PD	S&D	16 July 2024			
Irene Tinagli	North-West Italy	PD	S&D	2 July 2019			
Brando Benifei	North-West Italy	PD	S&D	1 July 2014			
Pierfrancesco Maran	North-West Italy	PD	S&D	16 July 2024		Elected after Alessandro Zan gave up his seat; president of the European Parliament Committee on the Environment, Public Health and Food Safety	
Stefano Bonaccini	North-East Italy	PD	S&D	16 July 2024		PD 2024 list leader in North-East Italy	
Alessandro Zan	North-East Italy	PD	S&D	16 July 2024			
Alessandra Moretti	North-East Italy	PD	S&D	2 July 2019 (Note: Moretti also served as an MEP between 2014 and 2015.)		Auto-suspended from the S&D group since 4 March 2025; legal immunity revoked on 16 December 2025 (Note: Moretti had her legal immunity revoked as per voting from the European Parliament, following her involvement in the Qatargate scandal)	
Annalisa Corrado	North-East Italy	PD	S&D	16 July 2024			
Dario Nardella	Central Italy	PD	S&D	16 July 2024			
Matteo Ricci	Central Italy	PD	S&D	16 July 2024			
Nicola Zingaretti	Central Italy	PD	S&D	16 July 2024			
Camilla Laureti	Central Italy	PD	S&D	11 January 2022 (Note: Laureti became an MEP following the death of President of the European Parliament, David Sassoli.)			
Marco Tarquinio	Central Italy	PD (DemoS)	S&D	16 July 2024		Elected after Elly Schlein refused to take her seat	
Lucia Annunziata	Southern Italy	PD (Ind.)	S&D	16 July 2024		PD 2024 list leader in Southern Italy	
Georgia Tramacere	Southern Italy	PD	S&D	11 February 2026		Elected after Antonio Decaro gave up his seat	
Raffaele Topo	Southern Italy	PD	S&D	16 July 2024			
Sandro Ruotolo	Southern Italy	PD	S&D	16 July 2024			
Giuseppe Lupo	Italian Islands	PD	S&D	16 July 2024		Elected after Elly Schlein refused to take her seat	
Gaetano Pedullà	North-West Italy	M5S (Ind.)	Left	16 July 2024			
Carolina Morace	Central Italy	M5S (Ind.)	Left	16 July 2024		M5S list leader in Central Italy	
Dario Tamburrano	Central Italy	M5S	Left	16 July 2024 (Note: Tamburrano also served as an MEP between 2014 and 2019, when the Five Star Movement was a member of the EFDD group.)			
Pasquale Tridico	Southern Italy	M5S (Ind.)	Left	16 July 2024		M5S list leader in Southern Italy; President of the European Parliament Subcommittee on Tax Matters	
Valentina Palmisano	Southern Italy	M5S	Left	16 July 2024			
Mario Furore	Southern Italy	M5S	Left	2 July 2019 (Note: In the Ninth European Parliament, the Five Star Movement was part of the Non-Inscrits.)			
Danilo Della Valle	Southern Italy	M5S	Left	16 July 2024			
Giuseppe Antoci	Italian Islands	M5S	Left	16 July 2024		M5S list leader in Italian Islands	
Letizia Moratti	North-West Italy	FI	EPP	16 July 2024			
Massimiliano Salini	North-West Italy	FI	EPP	1 July 2014 (Note: Salini was a member of New Centre-Right until 2015, when he joined Forza Italia.)		Elected after Antonio Tajani refused to take his seat	
Flavio Tosi	North-East Italy	FI	EPP	16 July 2024		Elected after Antonio Tajani refused to take his seat	
Herbert Dorfmann	North-East Italy	FI (SVP)	EPP	14 July 2009		Elected as part of the electoral alliance between the SVP and FI in the North-East Italy constituency	
Salvatore De Meo	Central Italy	FI	EPP	1 February 2020		Elected after Antonio Tajani refused to take his seat	
Fulvio Martusciello	Southern Italy	FI	EPP	1 July 2014			
Giuseppina Princi	Southern Italy	FI	EPP	16 July 2024		Elected after Antonio Tajani refused to take his seat	
Marco Falcone	Italian Islands	FI	EPP	16 July 2024			
Caterina Chinnici	Italian Islands	FI	EPP	1 July 2014 (Note: Chinnici was a member of the Democratic Party and the S&D group until 2023, when she switched to Forza Italia and the EPP group.)		Elected after Edmondo Tamajo refused to take his seat	
Silvia Sardone	North-West Italy	Lega	PfE	2 July 2019 (Note: In the Ninth European Parliament, Lega was part of the Identity and Democracy group.)			
Isabella Tovaglieri	North-West Italy	Lega	PfE	2 July 2019			
Anna Maria Cisint	North-East Italy	Lega	PfE	16 July 2024			
Paolo Borchia	North-East Italy	Lega	PfE	2 July 2019		Elected after Roberto Vannacci gave up his seat	
Susanna Ceccardi	Central Italy	Lega	PfE	2 July 2019		Elected after Roberto Vannacci gave up his seat	
Aldo Patriciello	Southern Italy	Lega	PfE	8 May 2006 (Note: Patriciello became an MEP after Lorenzo Cesa resigned from his role, having won a seat in the 2006 Italian general election. Initially a member of the Union of the Centre and the EPP group, he joined Forza Italia in 2008, The People of Freedom in 2009, and then returned to Forza Italia in 2013. He switched to Lega before the 2024 European Parliament election.)		Elected after Roberto Vannacci gave up his seat	
Raffaele Stancanelli	Italian Islands	Lega	PfE	2 July 2019			
Ilaria Salis	North-West Italy	AVS (SI, Ind.)	Left	16 July 2024			
Benedetta Scuderi	North-West Italy	AVS (EV)	G/EFA	16 July 2024		Elected after Domenico Lucano gave up his seat; spokesperson of the FYEG	
Cristina Guarda	North-East Italy	AVS (EV)	G/EFA	16 July 2024		Elected after Domenico Lucano gave up his seat	
Ignazio Marino	Central Italy	AVS (EV, Ind.)	G/EFA	16 July 2024			
Domenico Lucano	Southern Italy	AVS (SI, Ind.)	Left	16 July 2024			
Leoluca Orlando	Italian Islands	AVS (EV, Ind.)	G/EFA	16 July 2024 (Note: Orlando also served as an MEP between 1994 and 1999; at the time, he was a member of The Network and the Green Group.)		Elected after Ilaria Salis gave up her seat	
Elisabetta Gualmini	North-East Italy	Azione	RE	2 July 2019 (Note: In the Ninth European Parliament, Gualmini was a member of the Democratic Party and the S&D group.)		Originally elected with the Democratic Party; she switched to Azione on 16 February 2025, and joined the RE group on 24 February 2026	
Pina Picierno	Southern Italy	SP	RE	1 July 2014		Vice-President of the European Parliament. Originally elected with Democratic Party; she left the party to found Public Space on 7 June 2026, and she later joined RE on 16 June 2026.	
Roberto Vannacci	North-West Italy	Ind. (FN)	ESN	16 July 2024		Originally elected with the Lega; he left the party on 3 February 2026 to found National Future, and was subsequently expelled from the PfE group; he switched to the ESN group on 24 February 2026	

=== MEPs who resigned from their seat ===
Former MEP	Constituency	National party	EP Group	In office		Notes	Ref.
Former MEP	Constituency	National party	EP Group	Since	Until	Notes	Ref.
Antonio Decaro	Southern Italy	PD	S&D	16 July 2024	11 February 2026	Served as president of ENVI Committee; gave up his seat after winning the 2025 Apulian regional election; replaced by Georgia Tramacere	

=== Initially projected MEPs ===
Former MEP	National party	Notes	Ref.
Giorgia Meloni	FdI	FdI 2024 list leader in all constituencies; she won the seat, but refused to take it	
Elly Schlein	PD	PD 2024 list leader in Central Italy and Italian Islands; she won the seat, but refused to take it	
Antonio Tajani	FI	FI 2024 list leader in all constituencies, bar Italian Islands; he won the seat, but refused to take it	
Edmondo Tamajo	FI	Originally elected in the Italian Islands constituency, he refused to take the seat	

== See also ==
- Member of the European Parliament
