= List of members of the European Parliament for Luxembourg, 1979–1984 =

This is a list of the six members of the European Parliament for Luxembourg in the 1979 to 1984 session.

== List ==
Name	National party	EP Group
Victor Abens	Socialist Workers' Party	PES
Jean Wolter (until 18 July 1979) Nicolas Estgen (from 14 August 1979)	Christian Social People's Party	EPP
Fernand Boden (until 18 July 1979) Marc Fischbach (from 19 July 1979)	Christian Social People's Party	EPP
Colette Flesch (until 22 November 1980) René Mart (from 26 November 1980)	Democratic Party	LD
Gaston Thorn (until 18 July 1979) Jean Hamilius (from 19 July 1979 until 14 January 1982) Charles Goerens (from 15 February 1982)	Democratic Party	LD
Jacques Santer (until 18 July 1979) Jean Spautz (from 19 July 1979 until 04 March 1980) Marcelle Lentz-Cornette (from 05 March 1980)	Christian Social People's Party	EPP

=== Party representation ===
National party	EP Group	Seats	±
Christian Social People's Party	EPP	3 / 6	
Democratic Party	LD	2 / 6	
Socialist Workers' Party	PES	1 / 6	
