= Sacconi =

Sacconi is an Italian surname. Notable people with the surname include:

- Antonio Sacconi (1895–1968), Italian chess master
- Carlo Sacconi (1808–1889), Cardinal of the Roman Catholic Church and Dean of the College of Cardinals
- Deyvid Sacconi (born 1987), Brazilian footballer
- Giuseppe Sacconi (1854-1905), Italian architect
- Guido Sacconi (1948–2023), Italian politician
- Maurizio Sacconi (born 1950), Italian politician
- Simone Fernando Sacconi (1895–1973), Italian violin maker and restorer

== Other ==
- Sacconi Quartet, UK-based classical music string quartet founded in 2001
