= Pierre Bernard =

Pierre Bernard may refer to:

- Pierre Bernard (comedian), American graphic designer and comedian
- Pierre Bernard (footballer) (1932–2014), French soccer player
- Pierre Bernard (graphic designer) (1942–2015), French graphic designer
- Pierre Bernard (industrialist) (1922–1991), French industrialist
- Pierre Bernard (Montfermeil politician) (born 1934), French politician
- Pierre Bernard (rugby union) (born 1989), French rugby player
- Pierre Bernard (Tarn politician) (1934–2020), French politician
- Pierre Bernard (yogi) (1875–1955), American yogi, scholar, occultist, philosopher, mystic and businessman
- Pierre Bernard-Reymond (born 1944), French senator
