= Carla Barbarella =

Italian politician

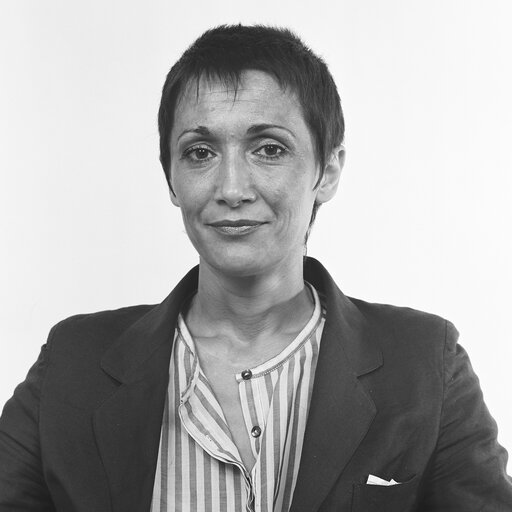
- Carla Barbarella as an MEP

Member of the European Parliament
- In office 1979–1989

Personal details
- Born: 4 February 1940 (age 86) Magione, Italy
- Party: Italian Communist Party

Carla Barbarella (born 4 February 1940 in Magione) is a former Italian politician from the Italian Communist Party who served as a member of the European Parliament from 1979 to 1989.

In 1989, she was named Shadow Minister of Agriculture in the Shadow Cabinet of Italy by Achille Occhetto, Secretary of the Italian Communist Party.

== See also ==
- List of members of the European Parliament for Italy, 1979–1984
- List of members of the European Parliament for Italy, 1984–1989
