= Gaetano Arfé =

Italian politician (1925–2007)

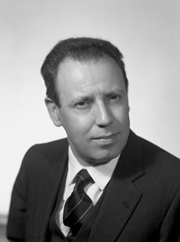
- Gaetano Arfé
- Born: 12 November 1925; Italy
- Died: 12 September 2007 (aged 81)

Gaetano Arfé (12 November 1925, Somma Vesuviana – 13 September 2007) was an Italian politician, historian, and journalist. From 1966 to 1976 he published Avanti!, the official newspaper of the Italian Socialist Party, which he represented as a Member of the European Parliament (MEP) from 1979 to 1984. He died at the age of 81 on 13 September 2007 in Naples.

== Political career ==
In 1968, Arfé raised concerns about the anti-democratic radicalization of the Italian student movement.

== Works ==
- Storia dell'Avanti! (1958)
- Storia del socialismo italiano 1892-1926 (1965)
- Storia delle idee politiche economiche e sociali (1972) (published in 5 volumes)
- La questione socialista (1986)
- I socialisti del mio secolo (2002)
- Scritti di storia e politica (2005)
