= Silvio Lega =

Italian politician (1945–2021)

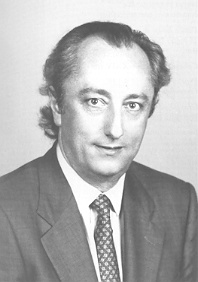

Member of the Chamber of Deputies
- In office 12 July 1983 – 14 April 1994
- Constituency: Turin

Personal details
- Born: 4 February 1945 Leini, Italy
- Died: 24 April 2021 (aged 76) Siena, Italy
- Cause of death: COVID-19
- Party: Christian Democracy
- Profession: Politician

Silvio Lega (4 February 1945 – 24 April 2021) was an Italian politician from the Christian Democracy party who served as member of the Chamber of Deputies from 1983 to 1994.

Lega died from COVID-19 at the age of 76 in 2021.
