= Anselmo Gouthier =

Italian politician (1933–2015)

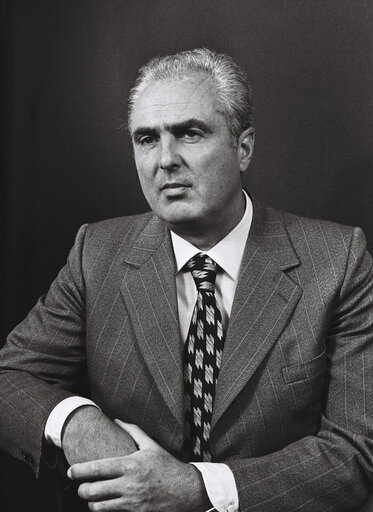

Member of the European Parliament
- In office 17 July 1978 – 23 July 1984
- Constituency: Italy

Personal details
- Born: 19 June 1933 Roure, Turin, Kingdom of Italy
- Died: 1 November 2015 (aged 82)
- Party: Italian Communist Party
- Occupation: Politician

Anselmo Gouthier (19 June 1933 – 1 November 2015) was an Italian politician. From 1979–1984 Gouthier served as a Member of the European Parliament (MEP), representing Italy for the Communist Party From 1983–1984, Gouthier served as Vice-Chair of the Delegation for relations with Yugoslavia
