= Vincenzo Lavarra =

Italian politician

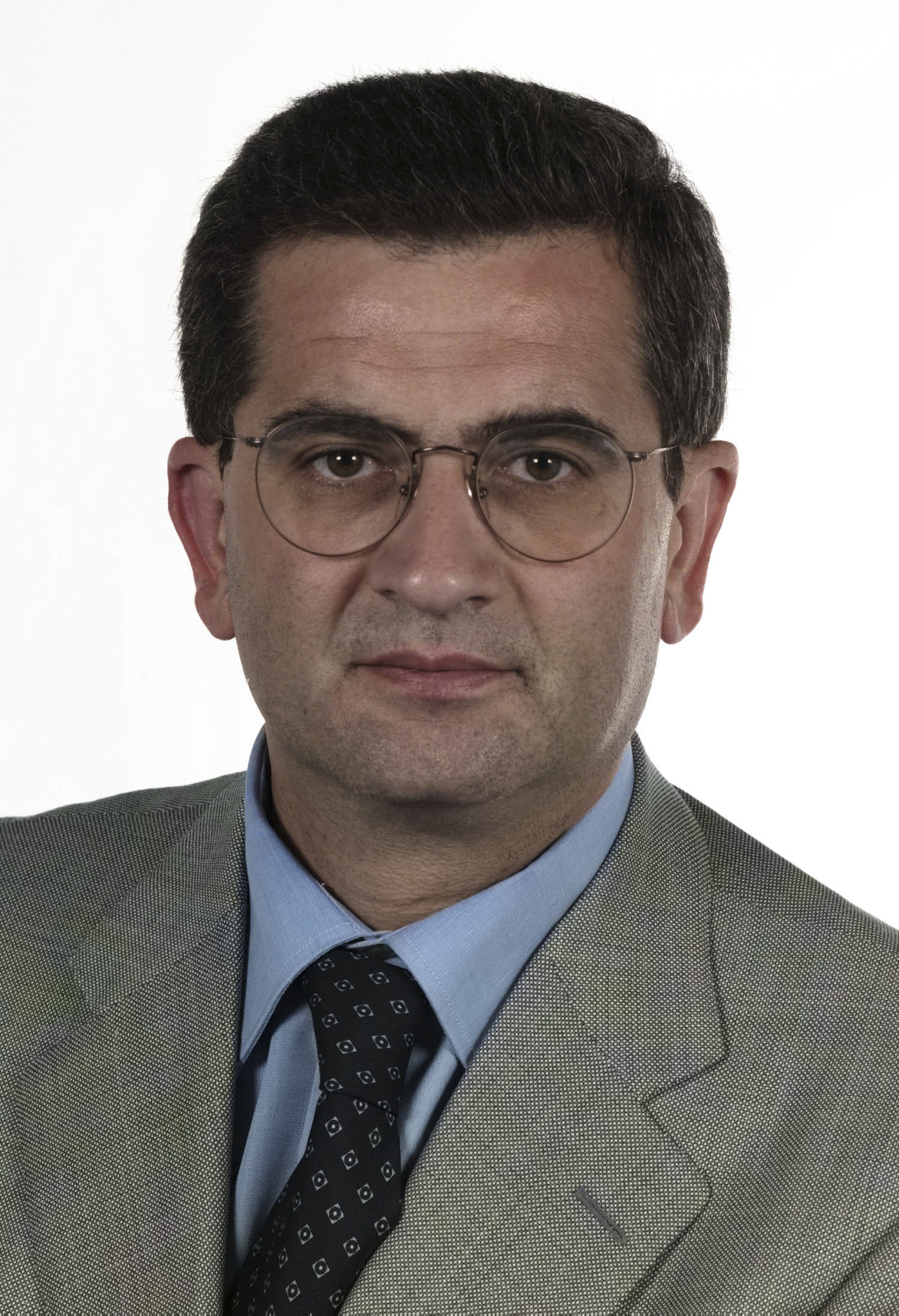
Lavarra in 1999

Vincenzo Lavarra (born January 27, 1954) is an Italian politician and a Member of the European Parliament. He is a member of the Democrats of the Left (DS), which is a part of the Socialist Group in the European Parliament. Lavarra is a member of the Committee on Industry, Research and Energy and the delegation for relations with the countries of Southeast Asia and the Association of Southeast Asian Nations. He is a substitute on the Committee on Agriculture and Rural Development and the delegation for relations with the People's Republic of China.

Lavarra was born in Gioia del Colle, Apulia. In 1977 he obtained a degree in literature and philosophy. From 1979 to 1982 he was the chief editor of the Italian communist newspaper L'Unità in Apulia. He was a DS Regional Secretary for Apulia and a member of the DS national executive. In July 2004 he was a vice-chairman of the provincial government of Bari.

== 5th Parliamentary term ==
Vincenzo Lavarra was first elected as a Member of the European Parliament in 1999 and continued to serve until 2004. During this time he was a vice-chairman of the Committee on Agriculture and Rural Development from July 21, 1999, to January 14, 2002, and also a member from January 17, 2002, to July 19, 2004. He was a member of the Committee on Fisheries from July 21, 1999, to January 14, 2002, and from January 17, 2002, to July 19, 2004. He was also a member of the delegation for relations with the countries of southeast Europe from June 10, 1999, to January 14, 2002, and from February 7, 2002, to July 19, 2004.

From February 7, 2002, to April 30, 2004, he was a member of the delegation to the EU-Malta Joint Parliamentary Committee. He was also a member of the delegation for relations with the countries of Southeast Asia and the Association of Southeast Asian Nations from June 7, 2005, and a member of the Committee on Industry, Research and Energy from June 22, 2005.

From July 22, 1999, to January 14, 2002, and from January 17, 2002, to July 19, 2004, he was a substitute on the Committee on the Environment, Public Health and Consumer Policy. From October 8, 1999, to January 14, 2002, and from February 7, 2002, to July 19, 2004, he was a substitute for the delegation to the EU-Romania Joint Parliamentary Committee. From January 17, 2002, to December 17, 2002, he was a substitute for a temporary committee on foot and mouth disease. From May 26, 2005, he was a substitute for the delegation for relations with the People's Republic of China, and from June 22, 2005, he was a substitute for the Committee on Agriculture and Rural Development.
