= Michl Ebner =

Italian politician

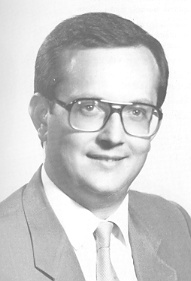

Member of the European Parliament
- In office 1994–2009
- Constituency: North-East

Personal details
- Born: 20 September 1952 (age 72); Bolzano, Italy
- Political party: SVP

Michl Ebner (born 20 September 1952) is an Italian politician and a former Member of the European Parliament for North-East with the South Tyrolean People's Party, Member of the Bureau of the European People's Party.

During his term he sat on the European Parliament's Committee on Agriculture and Rural Development. He was also a substitute for the Committee on Foreign Affairs and a member of the Delegation to the EU-Croatia Joint Parliamentary Committee.

From 2015-2019, he held the position of President of the Federation of Associations for Hunting and Conservation of the EU.

== Career ==
- since 1972: Political work in the youth group of the SVP (South Tyrolean People's Party)
- since 1979: Member of the SVP leadership

== Education ==
- Member of the standing committee for questions concerning the Province of Bolzano
- 1987-1994: Member of the Chamber of Deputies of Italy (1979–1994), member of the Committee on Public Works and the Environment (1979–1987), the Committee on Agriculture (1987–1994) and of the Bureau of the Chamber of Deputies
- since 1994: Member of the European Parliament
- since 2008 President of the Chamber of Commerce of South Tyrol

== See also ==
- 2004 European Parliament election in Italy
