= Communist and Allies Group =

Former communist political group of the European Parliament (1973–1989)

Communists and Allies
- European Parliament group
- Name: Communists and Allies
- English abbr.: COM
- French abbr.: n/a
- Formal name: Communist and Allies Group
- Ideology: Communism
- From: 16 October 1973
- To: 25 July 1989
- Succeeded by: Left Unity, Group for the European United Left
- Chaired by: Giorgio Amendola, Guido Fanti, Gianni Cervetti
- MEP(s): 44 (17 July 1979); 41 (23 July 1984)

The Communist and Allies Group was a communist political group with seats in the European Parliament between 1973 and 1989.

== History ==
The "Communist and Allies Group" was the first communist group in the European Parliament, founded on 16 October 1973.

The Communist and Allies Group included MEPs from the Communist parties of France and Italy. It stayed together until 25 July 1989 when it split into two groups, "Left Unity" (LU) with 14 members and the "Group for the European United Left" (EUL) with 28 members.

== Sources ==
- Development of Political Groups in the European Parliament
- EUL/NGL on Europe Politique
- Democracy in the European Parliament
- European Parliament MEP Archives
