= Francescopaolo D'Angelosante =

Italian politician

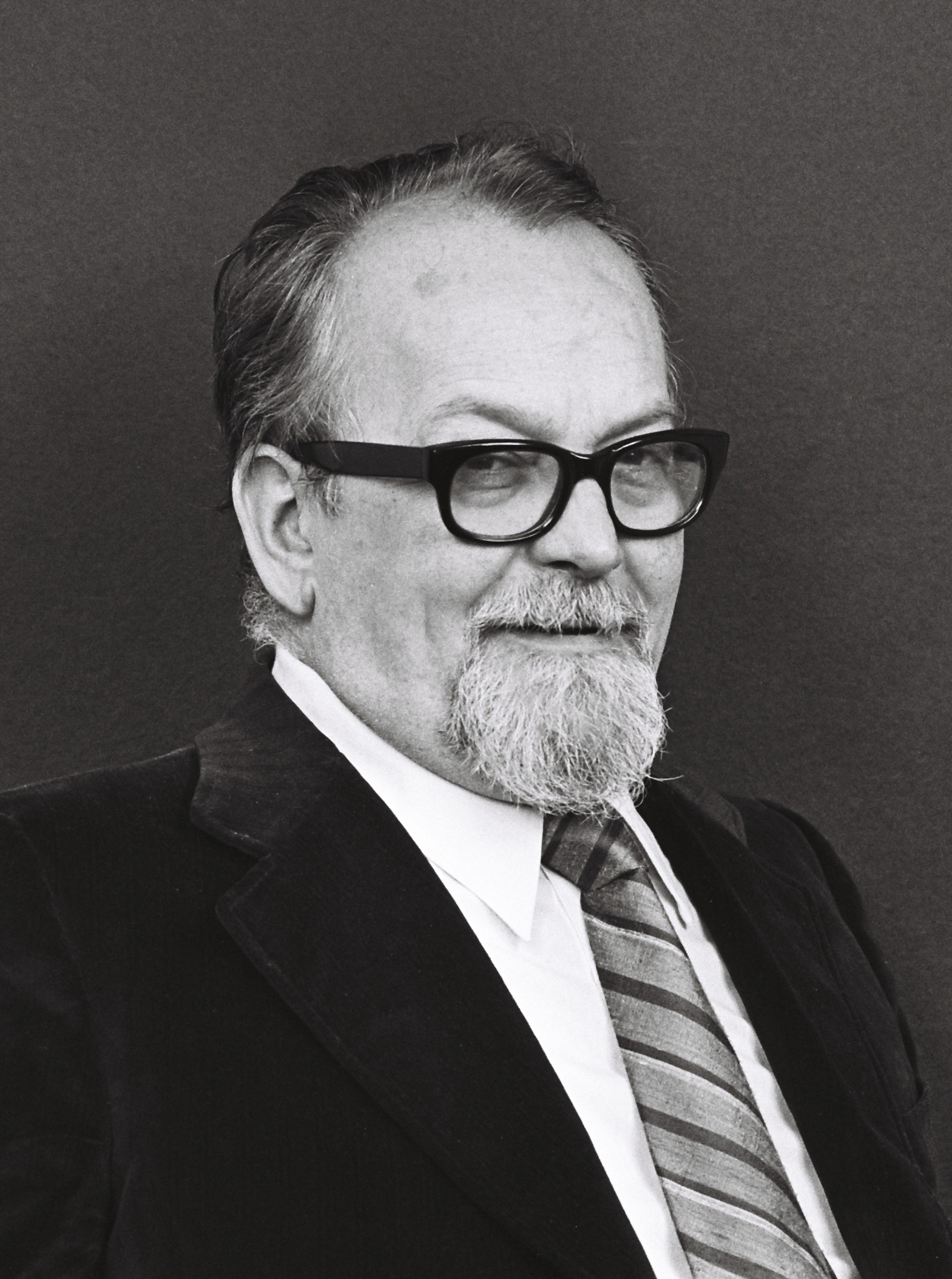

Member of the European Parliament
- In office 21 January 1969 – 23 July 1984
- Constituency: Italy

Personal details
- Born: 17 September 1922 Penne, Abruzzo, Kingdom of Italy
- Died: 15 April 1997 (aged 74)
- Party: Italian Communist Party
- Occupation: Politician

Francescopaolo D'Angelosante (1922–1997) was an Italian politician. From 1969–1984, he served as a Member of the European Parliament (MEP). He was a member of the Communist Party of Italy. From 1983–1984 he served as Vice-Chair of the Delegation for relations with the Member States of ASEAN and the ASEAN Interparliamentary Organisation (AIPO).
