= Silvio Leonardi =

Italian politician (1914–1990)

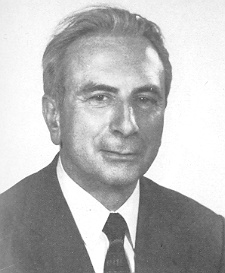

Member of the European Parliament
- In office 17 July 1979 – 23 July 1984
- Constituency: Italy

Personal details
- Born: 16 July 1914 Turin, Piedmont, Kingdom of Italy
- Died: 21 April 1990 (aged 75)
- Party: Italian Communist Party
- Occupation: Politician

Silvio Leonardi (16 July 1914 – 21 April 1990) was an Italian politician. From 1979 to 1984, he served as a Member of the European Parliament (MEP). He was a member of the Communist Party of Italy. From 1978 to 1979, he served as Chair of the Committee on the Rules of Procedure and Petitions and Vice-Chair of the Committee on Economic and Monetary Affairs. From 1963 to 1979, he was also a member of the Chamber of Deputies.
