= Nicolas Estgen =

Luxembourgish politician (1930–2019)

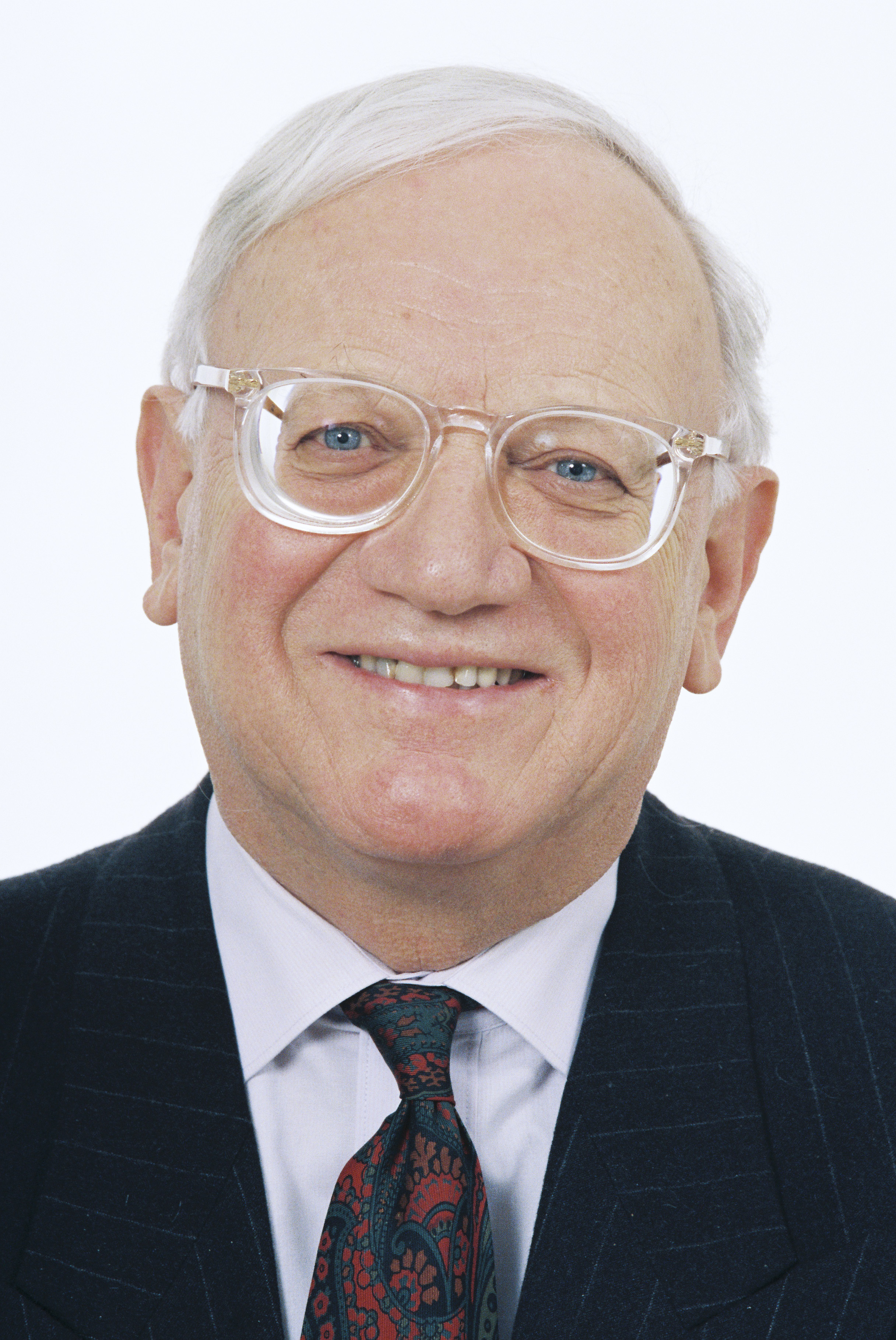
Official portrait, 1989

Nicolas Estgen (28 February 1930 – 26 December 2019) was a Luxembourgish politician for the Christian Social People's Party and head teacher. He sat in the European Parliament from 1979 until 1994.
