= Stefano Zappalà =

Italian politician

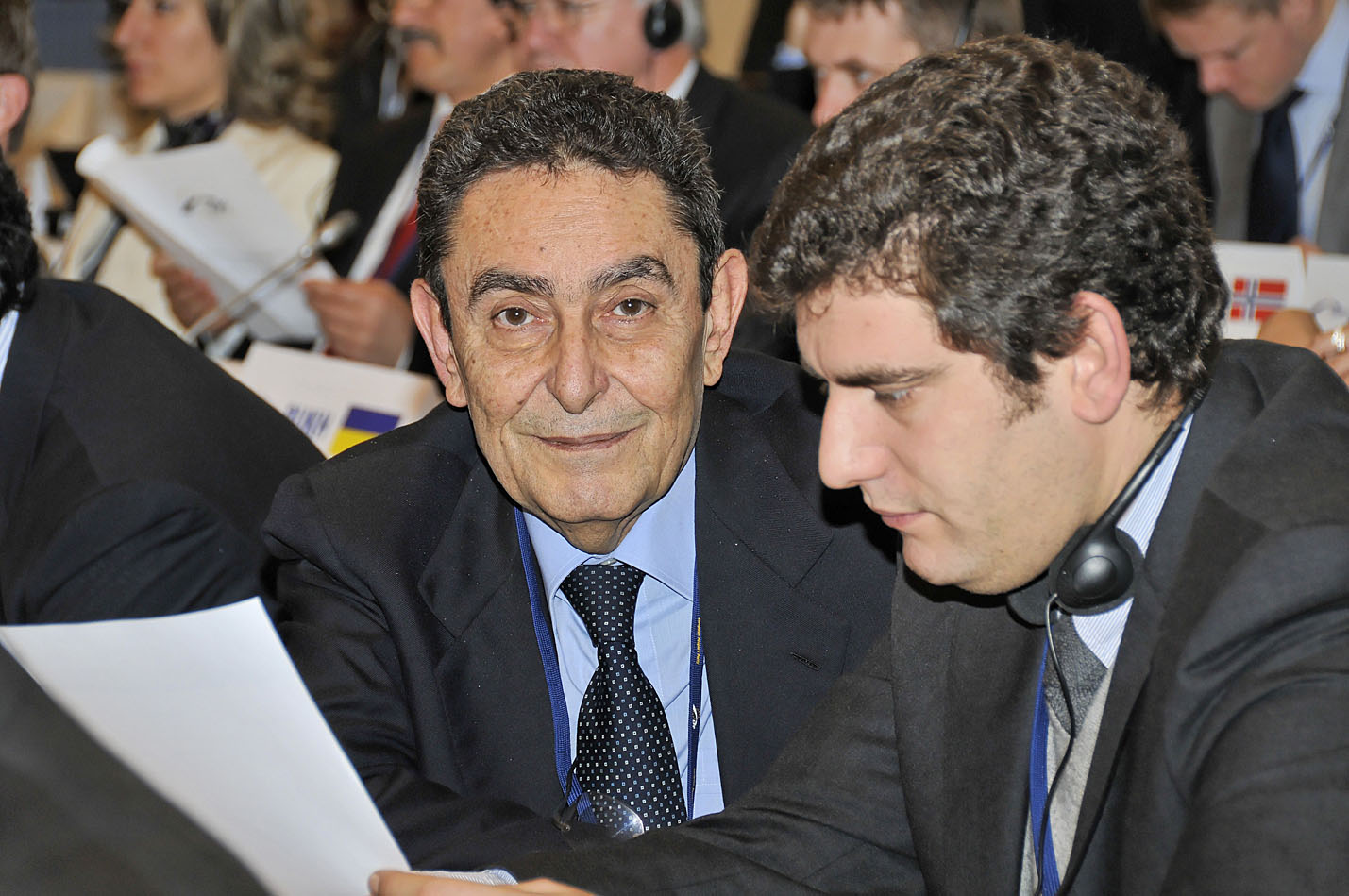
Zappalà (left) in 2009

Stefano Zappalà (6 February 1941 in Aci Bonaccorsi – 15 April 2018 in Latina) was an Italian politician and Member of the European Parliament for Central with the Forza Italia, part of the European People's Party and is vice-chair of the European Parliament's Committee on Civil Liberties, Justice and Home Affairs.

He was a substitute for the Committee on the Internal Market and Consumer Protection, a member of the Delegation for relations with the Palestinian Legislative Council and a substitute for the Delegation to the EU-Kazakhstan, EU-Kyrgyzstan and EU-Uzbekistan Parliamentary Cooperation Committees, and for relations with Tajikistan, Turkmenistan and Mongolia.

== Education ==
- 1959: Secondary school-leaving certificate in classical subjects

== Career ==
- 1960–1962: Military Academy of Modena
- 1962–1964: Artillery College (Turin)
- 1971–1973: higher technical course (Rome)
- 1964: graduate in strategic sciences
- 1973: degree in mathematics
- 1976: degree in civil engineering
- until 1979: Officer in the Italian army
- 1980–1994: self-employed engineer and businessman
- since 1994: Deputy coordinator for Forza Italia, Lazio
- 1997–2002: Member of Latina City Council
- 1995–2000: Member of Lazio Regional Council
- 2002–2005: Mayor of Pomezia, Rome
- since 1999: Member of the European Parliament

== See also ==
- 2004 European Parliament election in Italy
