= Italian Islands (European Parliament constituency) =

- European Parliament constituency
- Location among the current constituencies

- Shown in Italy in red
- Member state: Italy
- Created: 1979
- MEPs: 8–6 (2009), 7 (2004), 10 (1999), 10 (1994)

In European elections, Italian Islands is a constituency of the European Parliament. It consists of the regions of Sardinia and Sicily.

As in the other Italian constituencies, it has only a procedural goal to choose the elected MEPs inside party lists, the distribution of seats between different parties being calculated at national level (called Collegio Unico Nazionale, National Single Constituency).

== Criticism ==
Due to the significant population difference between the islands, the Constituency does not secure the same amount of representation for the two islands: the elected MEPs usually come only from Sicily and leave out Sardinia. The latter does not usually have its own representatives, unless they get enough votes in Sicily too (like in 2014) or some Sicilian MEPs resign, leaving space for the Sardinian candidates. Critics of the Italian law defining the constituency boundaries have compared this electoral imbalance with Malta, an island country with less than ten percent of the population of this constituency that has an equal number of MEPs. Being the Sardinians a recognized minority language group (unlike Sicily), the Association for the Protection of the Rights of the Sardinians appealed to the courts, so as to see their right to be granted a fixed number of MEPs, as is already the case for the equally recognised minorities of the Aosta Valley, Trentino and Friuli, but such demands have been rejected by the Italian Constitutional Court. Likewise, the proposal to split the constituency has been blocked by the Italian Parliament. In 2019, Rome's lack of intercession to the appeals made by the national party secretariats in Sardinia saw Sardinia's chance to gain a seat in the European Parliament fade away once again. In 2022, in response to a request from the Sardinian Regional Council, Regional Affairs Minister Roberto Calderoli declared his readiness for an amendment to the 1979 electoral law, asserting that the single constituency penalises Sardinian candidates.
