= Roberto Costanzo =

Italian politician (1929–2026)

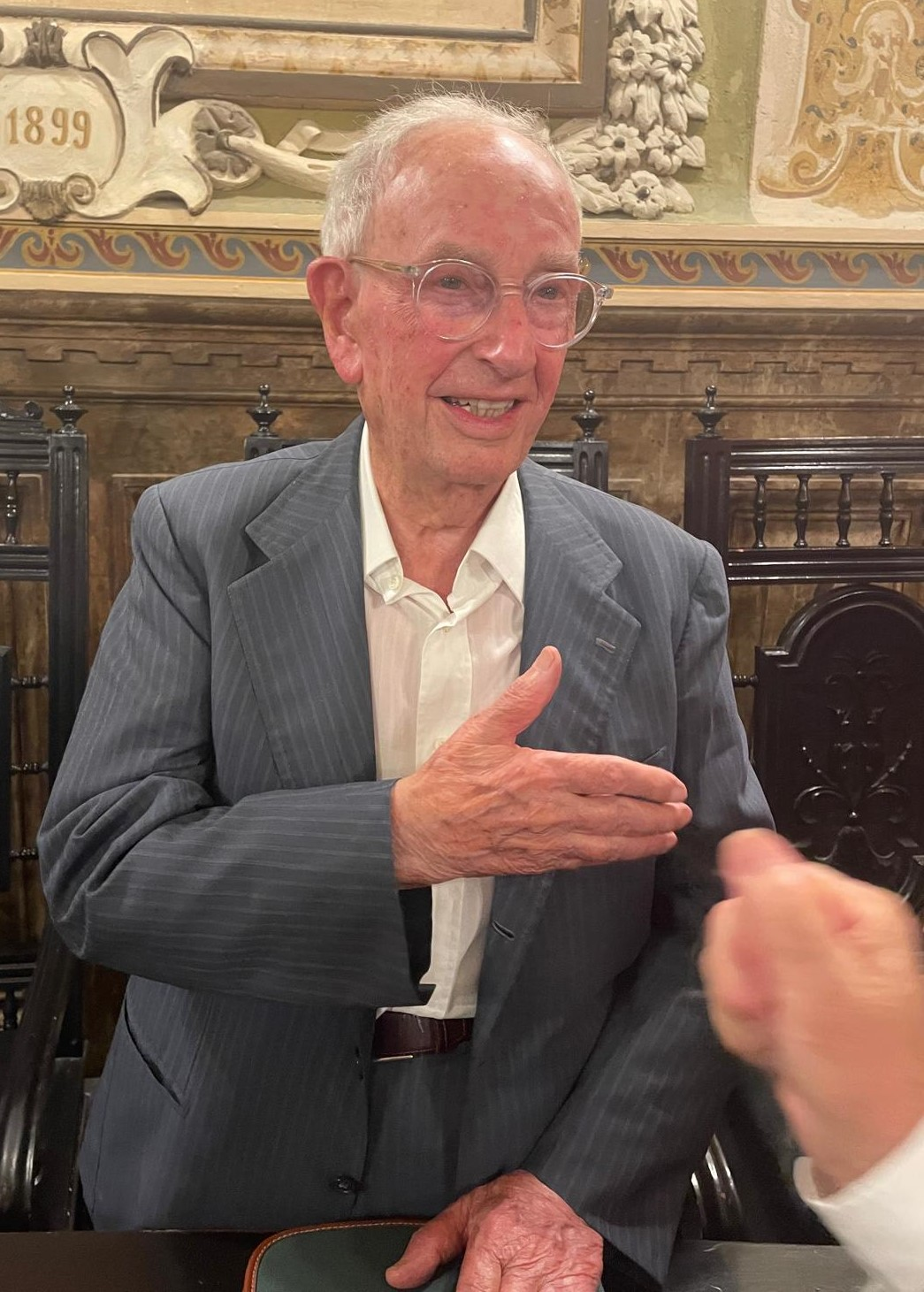
- Costanzo in 2025

Member of the European Parliament for Southern Italy
- In office 17 July 1979 – 24 July 1989

Personal details
- Born: 27 November 1929 San Marco dei Cavoti, Italy
- Died: 8 August 2026 (aged 96) San Marco dei Cavoti, Italy
- Party: DC
- Occupation: Civil servant

Roberto Costanzo (27 November 1929 – 8 August 2026) was an Italian politician. A member of Christian Democracy, he served as a member of the European Parliament from 1979 to 1989.

Costanzo died in San Marco dei Cavoti on 8 August 2026, at the age of 96.
