= Bruno Ferrero =

Italian politician

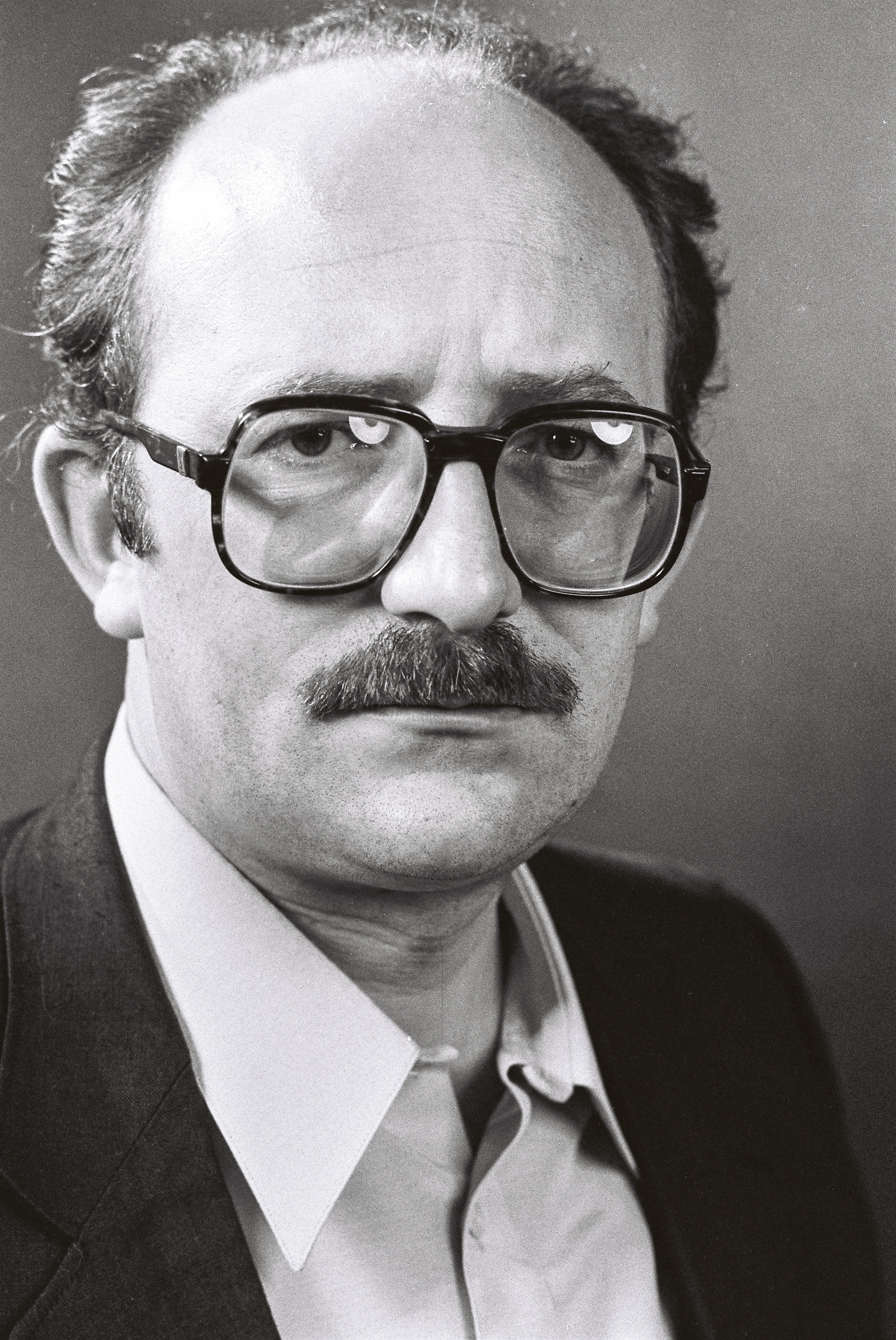

Member of the European Parliament
- In office 17 July 1979 – 24 July 1989
- Constituency: Italy

Personal details
- Born: 2 June 1943 Belluno, Veneto, Kingdom of Italy
- Died: 15 April 2006 (aged 62)
- Party: Italian Communist Party
- Occupation: Politician

Bruno Ferrero (2 June 1943 – 15 April 2006) was an Italian Communist Party politician. From 1979–1984 and 1988–1989, he served as a Member of the European Parliament (MEP).
