= Giovanni Bersani =

Italian politician (1914–2014)

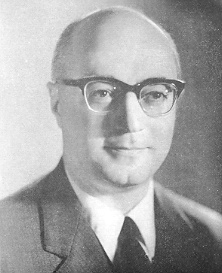
Giovanni Bersani

Giovanni Bersani (22 July 1914 – 24 December 2014) was an Italian politician. He was born and died in Bologna.

Bersani was a Christian Democratic deputy for six legislatures and a senator in his seventh.

He was a member of the European Parliament between 1960 and 1989 and undersecretary for the Minister of Labour and Social Welfare in 1952–53, in the De Gasperi cabinet.

== Honour ==
- Knight Grand Cross of the Order of Merit of the Italian Republic (30 June 1994)
