= Giosuè Ligios =

Italian politician (1928–2021)

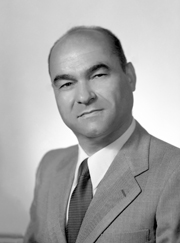
- Ligios in 1972

Member of the Senate of the Republic of Italy
- In office 25 May 1972 – 11 July 1983

Member of the European Parliament
- In office 1979–1989

President of the Province of Nuoro
- In office 23 November 1964 – 15 June 1969

Personal details
- Born: Giosuè Stefano Ligios; 26 December 1928 Bitti, Italy
- Died: 9 December 2021 (aged 92)
- Party: DC

Giosuè Stefano Ligios (26 December 1928 – 9 December 2021) was an Italian politician. A member of the Christian Democracy party, he served in the Senate of the Republic from 1972 to 1983 and in the European Parliament from 1979 to 1989.
