= Southern Italy (European Parliament constituency) =

Constituency of the European Parliament

- European Parliament constituency
- Location among the current constituencies

- Shown in Italy in red
- Member state: Italy
- Created: 1979
- MEPs: 18-15 (2009), 17 (2004), 21 (1999), 21 (1994)

In European elections, Southern Italy is a constituency of the European Parliament. It consists of the regions of Abruzzo, Apulia, Basilicata, Calabria, Campania and Molise.

As the other Italian constituencies, it has only a procedural goal to choose the elected MEPs inside party lists, the distribution of seats between different parties being calculated at national level (called Collegio Unico Nazionale, National Single Constituency).
