= Giovanni Giavazzi =

Italian politician (1920–2019)

Giovanni Giavazzi (14 April 1920 – 30 June 2019) was an Italian politician who served as a member of the European Parliament and as president of the Province of Bergamo.
