= Guido Sacconi =

Italian politician (1948–2023)

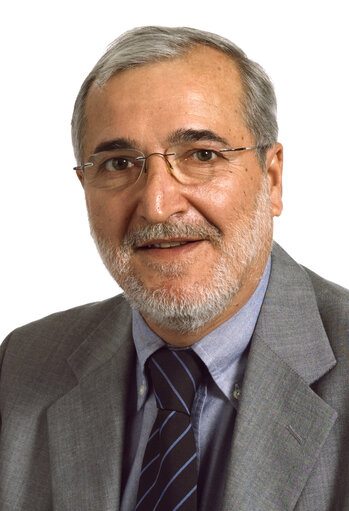

Guido Sacconi (23 June 1948 – 2 May 2023) was an Italian politician and a Member of the European Parliament for the Central region with the Democrats of the Left (DS), part of the Socialist Group, and sat on the European Parliament's Committee on the Environment, Public Health and Food Safety.

He was a substitute for the Committee on Agriculture and Rural Development, a member of the Delegation for relations with the People's Republic of China and a substitute for the Delegation for relations with the countries of South-east Europe.

Sacconi was born in Udine on 23 June 1948. He died in Florence on 2 May 2023, at the age of 74.

== Biography ==
Born in Udine, he moved to Florence at a young age, where he served as provincial secretary of the FIOM-CGIL, general secretary of the Florence Chamber of Labor from 1981 to 1990, and regional secretary of the CGIL in Tuscany. Since 1992, he has served as regional secretary of the Democratic Party of the Left. In this capacity, he proposed a federal party that would include the forces that would later participate in the founding of the Democrats of the Left.In 1995, he was elected regional councilor in Tuscany for the center-left coalition and served as vice president of the Regional Council.

Elected to the European Parliament in 1999 as a member of the DS, he was re-elected in 2004 on the Uniti nell'Ulivo list in the Central constituency, receiving 72,000 first-choice votes. He was a member of the Party of European Socialists parliamentary group. He was a member of the Committee on the Environment, Public Health, and Food Safety; the Committee on Agriculture and Rural Development; the Delegation for relations with the People’s Republic of China; and the Delegation for relations with the countries of Southeast Europe.

He then joined the Democratic Party (Italy), after some initial hesitation in 2009, he completed his term in the European Parliament.

In 2019, he ran for mayor of Vaglia as a candidate for the Democratic Party, receiving 33.7% of the vote and thus losing the election.

== Career ==
- 1967: Studied philosophy at the University of Florence
- 1972: Responsible for the research office at the Chamber of Labour of Florence
- Member of the Provincial Secretariat (1975) and then General Secretary (1978) of FIOM CGIL (Federazione Impiegati Operai Metallurgici)
- 1990: General Secretary of the Chamber of Labour of Florence
- until 1992: Regional Secretary of CGIL for Tuscany
- since 1992: Regional Secretary of the Democratic Party of the Left - Tuscany
- Member (1995) and then Vice-Chairman (1998) of the Regional Council of Tuscany
- 1995-1998: Secretary of the PDS Florentine Metropolitan Union
- since 1999: Member of the European Parliament
- Member of the delegation from the European Parliament to the Earth Summit 2002 (in Johannesburg), and to the Ninth Conference of the Parties to the UN Framework

== See also ==
- 2004 European Parliament election in Italy
