= Enzo Bettiza =

Dalmatian Italian writer and politician (1927–2017)

Vincenzo Bettiza
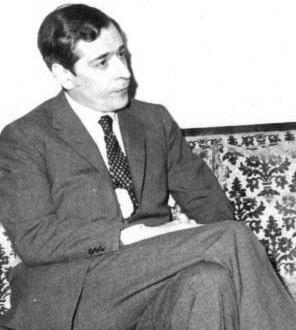
- Enzo Bettiza
- Born: 7 July 1927; Split, Kingdom of Serbs, Croats and Slovenes
- Died: 28 July 2017 (aged 90); Rome, Italy
- Occupations: Novelist, journalist, politician

Vincenzo Bettiza (7 June 1927 – 28 July 2017) was a Dalmatian Italian novelist, journalist, and politician.

== Biography ==
Bettiza was born in Dalmatia, then part of Kingdom of Yugoslavia, in a wealthy Dalmatian Italian-Croatian family, his mother descending from a family from the Croatian island of Brač who owned the Gilardi e Bettiza cement factory, in the city of Split. In 1941, when Bettiza was 13, Axis powers Italy and Germany invaded Yugoslavia. During Italian occupation and the subsequent the war, Bettiza's father helped many Croatian people to escape out of Fascist prison. The family also took an active role in fighting the invasion. Enzo Bettiza's cousin Pietro threw a bomb on the Italian army band, since they played Fascist marches, while Enzo himself boycotted Fascist gatherings and organizations.

In 1944, during the Italian Civil War, the city was rejoined to Croatia in new Yugoslavia. Many Italian families were forced to leave once they realized that, due to their association with Italian dictator Benito Mussolini, they were aconsidered "enemy of people". Whilst some Italian and mixed families remained, those who chose to retain Italian citizenship were deemed authorities being interested in dealing with those have been collaborating with the occupiers, either Croats, Italians or others. Their assets were nationalized. After the end of World War II, at the age of 18, Bettiza moved to Gorizia. Later he moved to Trieste, and then to Milan, where he finally settled. Bettiza always declared to consider himself as "an exile".

Bettiza has been the editor of several Italian newspapers and author of numerous books. As a journalist he devoted his attention to Eastern European politics, in particular Southeastern Europe and the Yugoslavian area. From 1957 to 1965 he was foreign correspondent for the newspaper La Stampa, first from Vienna and then from Moscow. Later he moved to Corriere della Sera, for which he worked for ten years. In 1974, together with Indro Montanelli, he founded the newspaper il Giornale nuovo, for which he was co-editor until 1983.

In 1976 he was elected as a member of the Italian Senate and the European Parliament for the Italian Liberal Party and moved to Rome. Bettiza married twice. First to Ludina Barzini, and then to Italian writer Laura Laurenzi. Bettiza's novel I fantasmi di Mosca (Phantoms of Moscow) runs for over 2,000 pages and is credited as the longest published novel written in Italian. Bettiza died on 29 July 2017 at the age of 90.

== Selected Bibliography ==
- Il fantasma di Trieste (1958)
- Non una vita (1963)
- Mito e realtà di Trieste (1966)
- Quale PCI? Anatomia di una crisi (1969)
- Il mistero di Lenin (1982)
- Saggi, viaggi, personaggi (1983)
- L'anno della tigre (1987)
- I fantasmi di Mosca (1993)
- L'eclisse del comunismo (1994)
- Esilio (1995)
- La campagna elettorale (1997)
- L'ombra rossa (1997)
- Via Solferino (1999)
- Mostri sacri (1999)
- La cavalcata del Secolo (2000)
- Corone e Maschere (2001)
- Viaggio nell'ignoto; il mondo dopo l'11 settembre (2002)
- Sogni di Atlante (2005)
- Il libro perduto (2005)

== Awards and medals ==
Bettiza received the Knight Grand Cross of the Order of Merit of the Italian Republic on 28 May 2003 from Italian President Carlo Azeglio Ciampi. In 2004 Croatian President Stipe Mesić awarded him with the Order of Danica Hrvatska with the face of Marko Marulić.
