= Carlo Alberto Galluzzi =

Italian politician

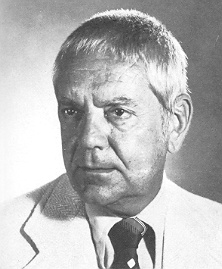

Member of the European Parliament
- In office 15 October 1976 – 24 July 1989
- Constituency: Italy

Personal details
- Born: 2 December 1919 Florence, Tuscany, Kingdom of Italy
- Died: 11 March 2000 (aged 80)
- Party: Italian Communist Party
- Occupation: Politician

Carlo Alberto Galluzzi (1919–2000) was an Italian politician. From 1976 till 1989, he served as a Member of the European Parliament. He was a member of the Communist Party of Italy. In 1983/1984 he served as Chair of the Delegation to the European Parliament/Spanish Cortes Joint Committee. From 1985 until 1987 he served as Chair of the Delegation for relations with Japan. During 1989 he served as Vice-Chair of the Delegation for relations with the Member States of ASEAN and the ASEAN Interparliamentary Organisation (AIPO) and the Republic of Korea.
