= Maria Lisa Cinciari Rodano =

Italian politician (1921–2023)

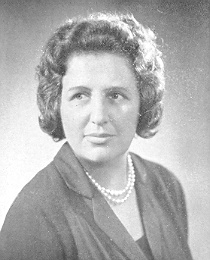
- Cinciari Rodano in the 1940s

Member of the Chamber of Deputies
- In office 8 May 1948 – 4 June 1968

Member of the Senate of the Republic
- In office 5 June 1968 – 24 May 1972

Member of the European Parliament
- In office 10 June 1979 – 18 June 1989
- Constituency: Central Italy

Personal details
- Born: Maria Lisa Cinciari; 21 January 1921; Rome, Italy
- Died: 2 December 2023 (aged 102); Rome, Italy
- Citizenship: Italy; Sahrawi (since 2022)
- Political party: PSC (1941–1946); PCI (1946–1991); PDS (1991–1998); DS (1998–2007)
- Spouse: Franco Rodano (m. 1944)
- Children: 5

Maria Lisa Cinciari Rodano (21 January 1921 – 2 December 2023) was an Italian politician. She served as a member of the Italian Parliament's lower and upper house, and as a member of the European Parliament for Central Italy. Rodano died on 2 December 2023, at the age of 102. Up until her death she was the last living member of the Legislature I of Italy.
