= Maria Luisa Cassanmagnago Cerretti =

Italian politician (1929–2008)

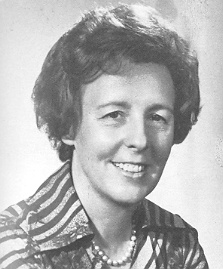

Member of the European Parliament
- In office 1979–1994

Member of the Chamber of Deputies
- In office 1972–1979

Personal details
- Born: 7 April 1929 Bergamo, Italy
- Died: 4 August 2008 (aged 79)
- Party: Christian Democracy; European People's Party Group
- Education: Università Cattolica del Sacro Cuore

Maria Luisa Cassanmagnago Cerretti (7 April 1929 – 4 August 2008) was an Italian politician. She represented the Christian Democracy in the Chamber of Deputies between 1972 and 1979 and the European People's Party Group in the European Parliament between 1979 and 1994.

== Early life ==
Cerretti was born on 7 April 1929 in Bergamo, Italy. She attended the Università Cattolica del Sacro Cuore, where she received a doctorate of economics and commercial science. She became a member of the Christian Democracy executive for the National Women's Movement in 1963.

== Political career ==
She was elected as a deputy in the Chamber of Deputies in the 1972 general election and the 1976 general election, and served on the Justice Commission and the Committee of the Prime Minister's Office, Internal Affairs and Religious Affairs. She was then elected as a member of the European Parliament in the 1979 election as a representative for the European People's Party Group. She was Vice-President of the European Parliament and the Bureau of the European Parliament. She was re-elected in the 1984 election and appointed as the vice-chair of the Committee on the Verification of Credentials and the Committee on Development and Cooperation. She served her third term after being re-elected in the 1989 election and was appointed as the chair of the Political Affairs Committee and the Members from the European Parliament to the Joint Assembly of the Agreement between the African, Caribbean and Pacific States and the European Economic Community. She was also the vice-chair of the Delegation for relations with Canada and the Committee on Foreign Affairs and Security.

After the dissolution of the Christian Democracy Party, she joined the Italian People's Party. She was a member of the federal assembly of the Democracy is Freedom – The Daisy, which was formed by a merger of the Italian People's Party, The Democrats and Italian Renewal.

Until her death on 4 August 2008, she was President of the Lombard Initiative Committee for the European Federal State.
