= List of members of the European Parliament (1984–1989) =

The second European Parliament election by direct universal suffrage, took place in June 1984. The citizens of nine countries elected overall 518 MEPs for a term of five years.

In 1986, the accession of Spain and Portugal meant the addition of new members from those countries.

== MEPs by Country ==
- MEPs for Belgium 1984–1989
- MEPs for Denmark 1984–1989
- MEPs for France 1984–1989
- MEPs for Greece 1984–1989
- MEPs for Ireland 1984–1989
- MEPs for Italy 1984–1989
- MEPs for Luxembourg 1984–1989
- List of members of the European Parliament for the Netherlands, 1984–1989
- MEPs for Portugal 1987–1989
- MEPs for Spain 1987–1989
- MEPs for the UK 1984–1989
- MEPs for West Germany 1984–1989

== A ==
- Jean-Pierre Abelin
- Victor Abens
- Carlos Aboim
- Gordon Adam
- Dimitrios Adamou
- Jochen van Aerssen
- Heinrich Aigner
- Alexandros Alavanos
- Siegbert Alber
- Jean-Marie Alexandre
- Manuel Almeida
- Giorgio Almirante
- José María Álvarez de Eulate
- José Álvarez de Paz
- Giuseppe Amadei
- Rui Amaral
- Werner Amberg
- Georgios Anastassopoulos
- Hedy d'Ancona
- Ettore Andenna
- Anne André-Léonard
- Niall Andrews
- Magdeleine Anglade
- Dario Antoniozzi
- Bernard Antony
- Víctor Manuel Arbeloa
- Pedro Argüelles
- Miguel Arias Cañete
- Rudi Arndt
- Evangelos Averoff-Tositsas
- Paraskevas Avgerinos

== B ==
- Jean-Paul Bachy
- Monique Badénes
- Gianni Baget Bozzo
- Louis Baillot
- Richard A. Balfe
- Francisco Pinto Balsemão
- Juan María Bandrés
- Mary Elizabeth Banotti
- Carla Barbarella
- Otto Bardong
- Enrique Barón
- Carlos Barral
- Sylvester Barrett
- José Barros
- Roberto Barzanti
- Robert Batailly
- Robert C. Battersby
- Dominique Baudis
- Denis Baudouin
- Charles E. Baur
- Bernardo Bayona
- Christopher Beazley
- Peter Beazley
- Hans-Joachim Beckmann
- Luis Filipe Pais Beirôco
- Maria Belo
- Carlos Manuel Bencomo
- Gérard Benhamou
- Pierre Bernard-Reymond
- Giovanni Bersani
- Jean Besse
- The Lord Nicholas Bethell
- Vincenzo Bettiza
- Bouke Beumer
- Luc Ch. H. Beyer de Ryke
- John A. W. Bird
- Philipp von Bismarck
- Birgit Bjørnvig
- Undine-Uta Bloch von Blottnitz
- Roland Blum
- Erik Bernhard Blumenfeld
- Gisèle Bochenek-Forray
- Reinhold L. Bocklet
- Jørgen Bøgh
- Alfons Boesmans
- Alain Bombard
- Aldo Bonaccini
- Jens-Peter Bonde
- Emma Bonino
- Margherita Boniver
- Elise C. A. M. Boot
- Franco Borgo
- Bodil Boserup
- Ioannis Boutos
- Ursula Braun-Moser
- Georges de Brémond d'Ars
- Jürgen Brinckmeier
- José António Brito
- Elmar Brok
- Beata Ann Brookes
- Paulin-Christian Bruné
- Carlos María Bru
- Janey O'Neil Buchan
- Hubert Jean Buchou
- José Miguel Bueno
- Martine Buron
- Antonino Buttafuoco

== C ==
- Esteban Caamaño
- Pío Cabanillas Gallas
- Jesús Cabezón
- José Cabrera Bazan
- Rafael Calvo
- Leopoldo Calvo-Sotelo
- Michel de Camaret
- Jorge Campinos
- Eusebio Cano
- Antonio Nicola Cantalamessa
- Manuel Cantarero
- Alain Carignon
- Angelo Carossino
- José Vicente Carvalho
- Carlo Casini
- Jean-Pierre Cassabel
- Maria Luisa Cassanmagnago Cerretti
- Bryan M.D. Cassidy
- Luciana Castellina
- Barbara A. Castle
- Sir Fred Catherwood
- Marco Cellai
- José Emilio Cervera
- Giovanni Cervetti
- Dominique Chaboche
- Robert Chambeiron
- Raphaël M. G. Chanterie
- Mauro Chiabrando
- Roger Chinaud
- Vittorino Chiusano
- Louis Chopier
- Nicole Chouraqui
- Ib Christensen
- Ejner Hovgård Christiansen
- Efthymios Christodoulou
- Michelangelo Ciancaglini
- Roberto Cicciomessere
- Maria Lisa Cinciari Rodano
- Mark Clinton
- José Coderch
- Robert Cohen
- António Antero Coimbra
- Juan Luis Colino
- Michel Collinot
- Kenneth D. Collins
- Joan Colom
- Michele Columbu
- Francesco Compasso
- Fernando Condesso
- Petrus A. M. Cornelissen
- Roberto Costanzo
- Alfred Coste-Floret
- Jean-Pierre Cot
- Richard J. Cottrell
- John de Courcy Ling
- Baroness Christine M. Crawley
- Rodolfo Crespo
- Lambert V. J. Croux
- Jean E. Crusol
- George Robert Cryer
- David M. Curry

== D ==
- Joachim Dalsass
- Margaret E. Daly
- Pieter Dankert
- Rika M. R. De Backer
- Michel Debatisse
- Karel De Gucht
- Antonio Del Duca
- Robert Delorozoy
- Danielle De March-Waller
- Ciriaco De Mita
- Jean-François Deniau
- Pancrazio De Pasquale
- Gérard Deprez
- Stéphane Dermaux
- Claude J.-M. J. Desama
- Dimitrios Dessylas
- Gilbert Devèze
- Gijs M. de Vries
- August M. C. De Winter
- Ramón Díaz del Río
- Mario Di Bartolomei
- Mario Didò
- Carmen Díez de Rivera
- Nel B. M. van Dijk
- Chrysanthos Dimitriadis
- Aristides Dimopoulos
- Georges H. Donnez
- The Lord Douro
- José Manuel Duarte Cendán
- Daniel Ducarme
- Bárbara Dührkop
- Peter Klaus Duetoft
- Anne-Marie Dupuy
- Emilio Duran
- Josep Antoni Duran i Lleida
- Raymonde M. E. A. Dury

== E ==
- Manfred Artur Ebel
- The Baroness Elles
- James Elles
- Michael N. Elliott
- Vassilis Ephremidis
- Sergio Ercini
- Arturo Juan Escuder
- José Antonio Escudero
- Nicolas Estgen
- Rafael Estrella
- Dimitrios Evrigenis
- Winifred M. Ewing
- Louis Eyraud

== F ==
- Sheila Faith
- Roger Fajardie
- Alexander C. Falconer
- Guido Fanti
- André Fanton
- Léon Fatous
- Ludwig Fellermaier
- António José Fernandes
- Basil de Ferranti
- Concepció Ferrer
- Bruno Ferrero
- Ove Fich
- António Jorge de Figueiredo Lopes
- Konstantinos Filinis
- Gene Fitzgerald
- Jim Fitzsimons
- Seán Flanagan
- Colette Flesch
- Elena Flores
- Gaston Flosse
- Katharina Focke
- Nicole Fontaine
- Glyn Ford
- Roberto Formigoni
- André Fourçans
- Manuel Fraga
- Otmar Franz
- Bruno Friedrich
- Ingo Friedrich
- Isidor W. Früh
- Yvette M. Fuillet

== G ==
- Colette Gadioux
- Gerardo Gaibisso
- Yves A. R. Galland
- Max Gallo
- Carlo Alberto Galluzzi
- José Augusto Gama
- Juan Antonio Gangoiti
- Carlos Garaikoetxea
- Vasco Garcia
- Manuel García Amigo
- Ludivina García
- Antonio Garcia-Pagan
- José Luis García Raya
- Salvador Garriga Polledo
- Carles-Alfred Gasòliba
- Natalino Gatti
- Roger Gauthier
- Fritz Gautier
- Jas Gawronski
- Nikolaos Gazis
- Kyriakos Gerontopoulos
- Marietta Giannakou
- Giovanni Giavazzi
- Vincenzo Giummarra
- Emmanouil Glezos
- Ernest Glinne
- Roland Goguillot
- Fernando Gomes
- Friedrich-Wilhelm Graefe zu Baringdorf
- Jacqueline Grand
- Carlo Alberto Graziani
- Eva Gredal
- Maxime François Gremetz
- Winston James Griffiths
- Julián Grimaldos
- Anselmo Guarraci
- Guy Jean Guermeur
- Julén Guimon
- Antoni Gutiérrez

== H ==
- Otto von Habsburg
- Wolfgang Hackel
- Klaus Hänsch
- Benedikt Härlin
- Wilhelm F. T. Hahn
- Else Hammerich
- José H. G. Happart
- Brigitte Heinrich
- Fernand H. J. Herman
- José Ramón Herrero Merediz
- Robert Hersant
- Ien van den Heuvel
- Michael J. Hindley
- Rüdiger Hitzigrath
- Magdalene Hoff
- Jacqueline Hoffmann
- Karl-Heinz Hoffmann
- Geoffrey W. Hoon
- Paul F. Howell
- Leslie J. Huckfield
- Stephen Hughes
- Jean-Paul Hugot
- John Hume
- Alasdair Henry Hutton

== I ==
- Antonio Iodice
- Felice Ippolito
- John Iversen

== J ==
- Caroline Jackson
- Christopher Murray Jackson
- Erhard V. Jakobsen
- James L. Janssen van Raay
- Marie Jepsen
- Lionel Jospin
- Alain Juppé

== K ==
- Edward Kellett-Bowman
- Michael L. Kilby
- Mark Killilea Jnr
- Egon A. Klepsch
- Jan Klinkenborg
- Michael Klöckner
- Spiridon Kolokotronis
- Frode Kristoffersen
- Willy H. G. J. M. Kuijpers
- Leonidas Kyrkos

== L ==
- Antonio Augusto Lacerda
- José María Lafuente López
- Leonidas Lagakos
- Patrick Joseph Lalor
- Panayotis Lambrias
- Horst Langes
- Jessica E. S. Larive
- Pierre Lataillade
- Jean A. F. Lecanuet
- Jean-Marie Le Chevallier
- Olivier Lefevre d'Ormesson
- Martine Lehideux
- Bram van der Lek
- Eileen Lemass
- Gerd Ludwig Lemmer
- Marcelle Lentz-Cornette
- Marlene Lenz
- Jean-Marie Le Pen
- Marie-Noëlle Lienemann
- Giosuè Ligios
- Salvatore Lima
- Rolf Linkohr
- Anne-Marie A. Lizin
- Carmen Llorca Vilaplana
- César Llorens
- Alfred Lomas
- Gérard Longuet
- Charles-Emile Loo
- Hendrik J. Louwes
- Francisco Lucas Pires
- Zenon-José Luis
- Rudolf Luster
- Finn Lynge

== M ==
- John Joseph McCartin
- Giulio Maceratini
- Michael McGowan (politician)
- Hugh McMahon
- Edward McMillan-Scott
- Ray MacSharry
- Luís Filipe Madeira
- Emmanuel P. M. Maffre-Baugé
- Thomas Joseph Maher
- Hanja Maij-Weggen
- Kurt Malangré
- Philippe Malaud
- Christian de La Malène
- Jacques Mallet
- Jean-François Mancel
- Georges Marchais
- Pol M. E. E. Marck
- Francesca Marinaro
- Luís Marinho
- Alain Marleix
- António Marques Mendes
- António José Marques Mendes
- John Leslie Marshall
- Claudio Martelli
- David Martin (Scottish politician)
- Simone M. M. Martin
- Renato Massari
- Vincenzo Mattina
- Georgios Mavros
- Sylvie Mayer
- Federico Mayor
- José Manuel Medeiros Ferreira
- Manuel Medina
- Thomas Megahy
- Meinolf Mertens
- Alman Metten
- Alberto Michelini
- Karl-Heinrich Mihr
- Joaquim Miranda
- Ana Miranda de Lage
- Alfeo Mizzau
- Poul Møller
- Emilio Molinari
- Andoni Monforte
- José María Montero
- James Moorhouse
- Fernando Morán
- Alberto Moravia
- Raúl Morodo
- Giovanni Moroni
- David Morris
- Didier Motchane
- Jean Mouchel
- Ernest Mühlen
- Günther Müller
- Werner Münch
- Joaquim Muns
- Hemmo J. Muntingh
- François Musso

== N ==
- Alessandro Natta
- Antonio Navarro Velasco
- Giovanni Negri
- Lore Neugebauer
- Stanley Newens
- Eddy Newman
- Bill Newton Dunn
- Jørgen Brøndlund Nielsen
- Tove Nielsen
- Egbert Nitsch
- Hans Nord
- Jean-Thomas Nordmann
- Sir Tom Normanton
- Wolfgang von Nostittz
- Diego Novelli

== O ==
- Tom O'Donnell
- Charles Strachey, 4th Baron O'Hagan
- Francisco Oliva García
- Christopher Gerard O'Malley
- Jeanette Oppenheim

== P ==
- Ian Paisley
- Giancarlo Pajetta
- Roger Palmieri
- Marco Pannella
- Konstantina Pantazi
- Nikolaos Papakyriazis
- Giovanni Papapietro
- Christiane Papon
- Christos Papoutsis
- Eolo Parodi
- Roger Partrat
- Jean-Claude Pasty
- George Benjamin Patterson
- Andrew Pearce
- Jorge Pegado
- Jiří Pelikán
- Jean J. M. Penders
- Manuel Pereira
- Virgílio Pereira
- José Pereira Lopez
- Fernando Pérez Royo
- Luis Guillermo Perinat y Elío
- Nicole Pery
- Johannes Wilhelm Peters
- Francesco Petronio
- Gabriele Peus
- Gero Pfennig
- Pierre Pflimlin
- Dorothee Piermont
- Carlos Pimenta
- Sergio Pininfarina
- Maria de Lourdes Pintasilgo
- Pedro Augusto Pinto
- René-Emile Piquet
- Fritz Pirkl
- Ferruccio Pisoni
- Nino Pisoni
- Terry Pitt
- Luis Planas
- Spyridon Plaskovitis
- The Lord Plumb
- Hans Poetschki
- Hans-Gert Pöttering
- Lydie Polfer
- Mario Pomilio
- Michel C. Poniatowski
- Bernard Pons
- Josep Enric Pons Grau
- Gustave A. Pordea
- Lars Poulsen
- Derek Prag
- Pierre-Benjamin Pranchère
- Peter N. Price
- Christopher Prout, Baron Kingsland
- James L. C. Provan
- Alonso José Puerta
- Eduardo Punset

== Q ==
- Joyce G. Quin

== R ==
- Renate-Charlotte Rabbethge
- Tom Raftery
- Andrea Raggio
- Juan de Dios Ramírez Heredia
- Alfredo Reichlin
- Marcel Gh. A. A. Remacle
- Maria Dolors Renau
- Mario Rigo
- Günter Rinsche
- Dame Shelagh Roberts
- Carlos Robles Piquer
- François M. G. A. Ch. F. Roelants du Vivier
- Dieter Rogalla
- Rosario Romeo
- Georgios Romeos
- Domènec Romera
- Pino Romualdi
- Yvonne M. C. Th. van Rooy
- Walter Rosa
- Giorgio Rossetti
- André Rossi
- Tommaso Rossi
- Mechtild Rothe
- Willi Rothley
- Jean-Pierre Roux
- Xavier Rubert
- Richie Ryan

== S ==
- Henri Saby
- Bernhard Sälzer
- Jannis Sakellariou
- Heinke Salisch
- Felipe Sanchez-Cuenca
- Pedro Santana Lopes
- Manuel dos Santos
- Francisco Javier Sanz Fernández
- Enrique Sapena Granell
- Georgios Saridakis
- Giuseppe Schiavinato
- Dieter P. A. Schinzel
- Ursula Schleicher
- Gerhard Schmid
- Barbara Schmidbauer
- Lydie Schmit
- Konrad Schön
- Heinz Schreiber
- Frank Schwalba-Hoth
- James Scott-Hopkins
- Christiane Scrivener
- Barry H. Seal
- Horst Seefeld
- Hans-Joachim Seeler
- Sergio Camillo Segre
- Lieselotte Seibel-Emmerling
- Madron Seligman
- Gustavo Selva
- Alexander Sherlock
- Mateo Sierra
- José Silva Domingos
- Richard J. Simmonds
- Barbara Simons
- Anthony M. H. Simpson
- Llewellyn T. Smith
- Leopold Späth
- Altiero Spinelli
- Vera Squarcialupi
- Paul M. J. Staes
- Giovanni Starita
- Franz-Ludwig Schenk Graf von Stauffenberg
- Konstantinos Stavrou
- George W. Stevenson
- Kenneth A. Stewart
- Sir Jack Stewart-Clark
- Jean-Pierre Stirbois
- Fernando Suárez
- Georges Sutra

== T ==
- John Taylor
- Wilfried Telkämper
- Bernard Thareau
- Diemut R. Theato
- Jacqueline Thome-Patenotre
- Carlo Tognoli
- Claus Toksvig
- Teun Tolman
- John Tomlinson, Baron Tomlinson
- Carole Tongue
- Günter Topmann
- Enzo Tortora
- Raymond Tourrain
- Michel A. E. J. Toussaint
- Giovanni Travaglini
- Alberto Tridente
- Antonino Tripodi
- Renzo Trivelli
- Osvalda Trupia
- Frederick A. Tuckman
- Amédée E. Turner
- Ioannis Tzounis

== U ==
- Jakob von Uexkull
- Jef L. E. Ulburghs

== V ==
- Maurizio Valenzi
- José Valverde
- Jaak H.-A. Vandemeulebroucke
- Marijke J. H. van Hemeldonck
- Jean-Marie Vanlerenberghe
- Karel Van Miert
- Peter B. R. Vanneck
- Grigorios Varfis
- Marie-Claude Vayssade
- José Vázquez
- Luis Vega Escandón
- Simone Veil
- Herman A. Verbeek
- Josep Verde
- Willem J. Vergeer
- Paul Vergès
- Jacques Vernier
- Willy Vernimmen
- Heinz Oskar Vetter
- Nikolaos Vgenopoulos
- Phili Viehoff
- Ben Visser
- Silvio Vitale
- Kurt Vittinghoff
- Thomas von der Vring

== W ==
- Leen van der Waal
- Manfred W. Wagner
- Gerd Walter
- Kurt Wawrzik
- Beate Weber
- Rudolf Wedekind
- Michael J. Welsh
- Charles Wendeling
- Norman West
- Klaus H. W. Wettig
- Heidemarie Wieczorek-Zeul
- Florus A. Wijsenbeek
- Karl von Wogau
- Jos Wohlfart
- Claude Wolff
- Eisso P. Woltjer
- Francis Wurtz

== Z ==
- Mario Zagari
- Hans-Jürgen Zahorka
- Axel N. Zarges
- Spyridon Zournatzis

== See also ==
- 1984 European Parliament election
- List of members of the European Parliament 1984–1989
- Member of the European Parliament
