= List of members of the European Parliament for France, 1984–1989 =

Members of the European Parliament from France
ECSC delegation	(1952)
EP delegation	(1958)
1st term	(1979)
2nd term	(1984)
3rd term	(1989)
4th term	(1994)
5th term	(1999)
6th term	(2004)
7th term	(2009)
8th term	(2014)
9th term	(2019)
10th term	(2024)

This is a list of the 81 members of the European Parliament for France in the 1984 to 1989 session.

== List ==
Name	National party	EP Group	Constituency
Jean-Pierre Abelin	Union for French Democracy	EPP	
Michel Debatisse	Union for French Democracy	EPP	
Dominique Baudis (until 20 June 1988) Stéphane Dermaux (from 01 July 1988)	Union for French Democracy	EPP (until 20 June 1988) LDR (from 01 July 1988)	
Guy Jean Guermeur	Rally for the Republic	EDA	
Denis Baudouin	Rally for the Republic	EDA	
Alain Carignon (until 19 March 1986) Roger Gauthier (from 20 March 1986)	Rally for the Republic	EDA	
Magdeleine Anglade	National Centre of Independents and Peasants	EDA	
Pierre Bernard-Reymond (until 04 December 1986) Raymond Tourrain (from 05 December 1986)	Centre of Social Democrats (until 04 December 1986) Rally for the Republic (from 05 December 1986)	EPP (until 04 December 1986) EDA (from 05 December 1986)	
Roger Chinaud (until 03 April 1989) Jacqueline Grand (from 12 April 1989)	Republican Party (until 03 April 1989) Rally for the Republic (from 12 April 1989)	LDR (until 03 April 1989) EDA (from 12 April 1989)	
Nicole Chouraqui (until 01 September 1987) Gérard Benhamou (from 09 September 1987)	Rally for the Republic (until 01 September 1987) Radical Party (from 09 September 1987)	EDA (until 01 September 1987) LDR (from 09 September 1987)	
Alfred Coste-Floret	French Christian Democracy	EDA	
Jean-François Deniau (until 01 April 1986) Paulin Bruné (from 02 April 1986 to 30 June 1986) Jean-Pierre Cassabel (from 01 July 1986 to 28 October 1987) Christiane Papon (from 29 October 1987)	Union for French Democracy (until 30 June 1986) Rally for the Republic (from 01 July 1986)	LDR (until 30 June 1986) EDA (from 01 July 1986)	
Georges Donnez	Union for French Democracy	LDR	
Anne-Marie Dupuy (until 31 December 1988) Monique Badénès (from 06 January 1989)	Rally for the Republic (until 31 December 1988) Union for French Democracy (from 06 January 1989)	EDA (until 31 December 1988) EPP (from 06 January 1989)	
André Fanton	Rally for the Republic	EDA	
Gaston Flosse (until 19 March 1986) Pierre Lataillade (from 20 March 1986)	Rally for the Republic	EDA	
Nicole Fontaine	Union for French Democracy	EPP	
Yves Galland (until 18 August 1986) André Fourçans (from 19 August 1986)	Republican Party (until 12 December 1985) Radical Party (from 13 December 1985 until 18 August 1986) Union for French Democracy (from 19 August 1986)	LDR	
Robert Hersant	Union for French Democracy	EPP	
Alain Juppé (until 19 March 1986) Jean-Marie Vanlerenberghe (from 20 March 1986)	Rally for the Republic (until 19 March 1986) Union for French Democracy (from 20 March 1986)	EDA (until 19 March 1986) EPP (from 20 March 1986)	
Jean Lecanuet (until 09 October 1988) Jean-Paul Hugot (from 10 October 1988)	Union for French Democracy (until 09 October 1988) Rally for the Republic (from 10 October 1988)	EPP (until 09 October 1988) EDA (from 10 October 1988)	
Gérard Longuet (until 19 March 1986) Roland Blum (from 20 March 1986 to 03 April 1987) Hubert Jean Buchou (from 04 April 1987)	Republican Party (until 19 March 1986) Union for French Democracy (from 20 March 1986 to 03 April 1987) Rally for the Republic (from 04 April 1987)	LDR (until 03 April 1987) EDA (from 04 April 1987)	
Philippe Malaud	National Centre of Independents and Peasants	EDA	
Christian de la Malène	Rally for the Republic	EDA	
Jacques Mallet	Union for French Democracy	EPP	
Jean-François Mancel (until 11 December 1986) Charles Baur (from 12 December 1986)	Rally for the Republic (until 11 December 1986) Union for French Democracy (from 12 December 1986)	EDA (until 11 December 1986) LDR (from 12 December 1986)	
Simone Martin	Republican Party	LDR	
Jean Mouchel	Rally for the Republic	EDA	
François Musso	Rally for the Republic	EDA	
Jean-Thomas Nordmann	Radical Party	LDR	
Jean-Claude Pasty	Rally for the Republic	EDA	
Pierre Pflimlin	Centre of Social Democrats	EPP	
Michel Poniatowski	Union for French Democracy	LDR	
Bernard Pons (until 30 April 1985) Alain Marleix (from 01 May 1985)	Rally for the Republic	EDA	
André Rossi (until 05 September 1986) Robert Delorozoy (from 06 September 1986)	Republican Party (until 12 December 1984) Union for French Democracy (until 31 December 1984 from 13 December 1984) Radical Party (from 01 January 1985 to 05 September 1986) Union for French Democracy (from 06 September 1986)	LDR	
Jean-Pierre Roux (until 31 March 1987) Roger Partrat (from 01 April 1987 to 10 August 1988) Georges de Brémond d'Ars (from 09 September 1988)	Rally for the Republic (until 31 March 1987) Union for French Democracy (from 01 April 1987)	EDA (until 31 March 1987) EPP (from 01 April 1987 to 10 August 1988) LDR (from 09 September 1988)	
Christiane Scrivener (until 05 January 1989) Robert Batailly (from 07 January 1989)	Republican Party (until 05 January 1989) Radical Party (from 07 January 1989)	LDR	
Jacqueline Thome-Patenotre	Radical Party	EDA	
Simone Veil	Union for French Democracy	LDR	
Jacques Vernier	Radical Party	EDA	
Claude Wolff	Union for French Democracy	LDR	
Jean-Paul Bachy (until 23 June 1988) Martine Buron (from 01 July 1988)	Socialist Party	S	
Jean Besse	Socialist Party	S	
Alain Bombard	Socialist Party	S	
Gisèle Charzat	Socialist Party	S	
Jean-Pierre Cot	Socialist Party	S	
Louis Eyraud	Socialist Party	S	
Roger Fajardie (until 25 August 1987) Jean-Marie Alexandre (from 09 September 1987)	Socialist Party	S	
Léon Fatous	Socialist Party	S	
Yvette Fuillet	Socialist Party	S	
Colette Gadioux	Socialist Party	S	
Max Gallo	Socialist Party	S	
Lionel Jospin (until 12 May 1988) Jean Crusol (from 16 May 1988)	Socialist Party	S	
Marie-Noëlle Lienemann (until 25 June 1988) Louis Chopier (from 21 July 1988)	Socialist Party	S	
Charles-Emile Loo	Socialist Party	S	
Didier Motchane (until 22 May 1989) Charles Wendeling (from 24 May 1989)	Socialist Party	S	
Nicole Pery	Socialist Party	S	
Henri Saby	Socialist Party	S	
Georges Sutra de Germa	Socialist Party	S	
Bernard Thareau	Socialist Party	S	
Marie-Claude Vayssade	Socialist Party	S	
Jacqueline Hoffmann (until 29 April 1986) Sylvie Mayer (from 30 April 1986)	Communist Party	COM	
Danielle De March-Ronco (Waller)	Communist Party	COM	
Maxime Gremetz (until 29 April 1986) Louis Baillot (from 30 April 1986)	Communist Party	COM	
Robert Chambeiron	Communist Party	COM	
Pierre-Benjamin Pranchère	Communist Party	COM	
René-Emile Piquet	Communist Party	COM	
Georges Marchais	Communist Party	COM	
Emmanuel Maffre-Baugé	Communist Party	COM	
Dominique Chaboche (until 15 April 1986) Roland Goguillot (from 16 April 1986)	National Front	ER	
Michel de Camaret (until 24 June 1987) Roger Palmieri (until 01 July 1987)	National Front	ER	
Bernard Antony	National Front	ER	
Francis Wurtz	Communist Party	COM	
Paul Vergès	Communist Party (until 31 December 1984) Communist Party of Réunion (from 01 January 1985)	COM	
Michel Collinot	National Front	ER	
Jean-Marie Le Chevallier	National Front	ER	
Jean-Marie Le Pen	National Front	ER	
Martine Lehideux	National Front	ER	
Olivier Lefevre d'Ormesson	National Front (until 15 November 1987) National Centre of Independents and Peasants (from 16 November 1987)	ER (until 15 November 1987) NI (from 16 November 1987)	
Gustave Pordea	National Front	ER	
Jean-Pierre Stirbois (until 14 April 1986) Gilbert Devèze (from 16 April 1986)	National Front	ER	
