= List of candidates in the 1979 European Parliament election in the Netherlands =

The 1979 European Parliament election for the election of the delegation from the Netherlands was held on 7 June 1979. This is the 1st time the elections have been held for the European elections in the Netherlands.

== Background ==
The official order and names of candidate lists:

Candidate lists for the 1979 European Parliament election in the Netherlands
List		English translation	List name (Dutch)
1	list	Labour Party/European Socialists	Partij van de Arbeid/Europese Socialisten
2	list	CDA European People's Party	CDA Europese Volkspartij
3	list	VVD - European Liberal-Democrats	VVD - Europese Liberaal-Democraten
4	list	D'66	
5	list	S.G.P.	
6	list	C.P.N.	
7	list	P.P.R.	
8	list	G.P.V.	
9	list	P.S.P.	
10	list	List Leschot	Lijst Leschot

== Labour Party/European Socialists ==
Candidate list for the Labour Party
Number	Candidate	Votes	Result
1	Anne Vondeling	1,559,941	Elected
2	Ien van den Heuvel-de Blank	65,447	Elected
3	Pieter Dankert	14,164	Elected
4	Johan van Minnen	26,484	Elected
5	Wim Albers	5,194	Elected
6	Annie Krouwel-Vlam	7,985	Elected
7	Bob Cohen	1,684	Elected
8	Hemmo Muntingh	1,816	Elected
9	Eisso Woltjer	3,228	Elected
10	Phili Viehoff	2,000	Replacement
11	Dick Toornstra	968	
12	Henk Hartmeijer	1,599	
13	Frans Oudejans	2,975	
14	Elly Walter	2,525	
15	Jacques van Esch	1,720	
16	Griet Last-Elmendorp	987	
17	Sam Rozemond	938	
18	Bert Uri	597	
19	Nic Tummers	6,558	
20	Marie-José Grotenhuis	2,807	
21	René Glaser	751	
22	Hein Heering	794	
23	Jan Wentink	648	
24	Rob van de Water	886	
25	Evert van Dijk	1,479	
26	Riek Horeman-van Oorschot	1,294	
27	Ferry Rondagh	336	
28	Bert Broekhuis	666	
29	Henk Aben	334	
30	Gaston Sporre	809	
31	Willem Vermeend	523	
32	Frans Krips	478	
33	André Verbaan	1,265	
34	Aad Burger	2,360	
Total		1,722,240	

== CDA European People's Party ==
Candidate list for the Christian Democratic Appeal
Number	Candidate	Votes	Result
1	Bouke Beumer	1,839,966	Elected
2	Wim Vergeer	24,501	Elected
3	Teun Tolman	14,587	Elected
4	Elise Boot	9,745	Elected
5	Harry Notenboom	53,792	Elected
6	Sjouke Jonker	2,688	Elected
7	Frans van der Gun	2,319	Elected
8	Jean Penders	1,704	Elected
9	Hanja Maij-Weggen	4,685	Elected
10	Jim Janssen van Raaij	3,663	Elected
11	Rob van den Toorn	1,623	
12	Freek Piket	1,608	
13	Arie Oostlander	945	
14	Joep Mommersteeg	2,768	Replacement
15	Y. Schaaf	5,317	
16	Jan Reijnen	10,231	
17	Jan de Koning	2,268	
18	A. Oliemans	1,349	
19	Gerrit Braks	4,495	
20	Annemieke van Heel-Kasteel	1,489	
21	Jan Nico Scholten	2,640	
22	Joost van Iersel	640	
23	P.J. Blommestijn	578	
24	M. van Ditmarsch	574	
25	H.A. Strijd-Groenewegen	1,386	
26	Jan Hendriks	841	
27	W. van der Spek	1,418	
28	Hannie van Leeuwen	6,216	
29	Ton Lückers-Bergmans	3,781	
30	N.M.M.L. Hameleers	311	
31	R.A.E. Indemans	328	
32	J. Hollander	852	
33	J.A. Nijbakker	262	
34	B. Funk	1,472	
35	G.C. van Wijnbergen	248	
36	C.C. Kakes-Veen	687	
37	T.P.J.N. van Rijn	298	
38	J.F.M. van Erp	1,709	
39	H.W. van Heuven	518	
40	J. Cornelissen	3,241	
Total		2,017,743	

== VVD - European Liberal-Democrats ==
Candidate list for the People's Party for Freedom and Democracy
Number	Candidate	Votes	Result
1	Cornelis Berkhouwer	822,713	Elected
2	Hans Nord	6,109	Elected
3	Hendrik Jan Louwes	6,770	Elected
4	Aart Geurtsen	5,570	Elected
5	J.C.W. Taselaar echtgenote van Bogaards	13,578	
6	Florus Wijsenbeek	1,820	
7	Frits Bolkestein	2,691	
8	C. Trojan	977	
9	Hélène van Leuven-Ederveen	3,193	
10	J.G. Bruggeman	987	
11	Theo Joekes	2,039	
12	Angelina Fr.M. Hamm-Tonnaer	1,475	
13	P. Alberti	1,057	
14	Cees Goekoop	1,665	
15	Johan Schlingemann	662	
16	A.C.A. Dake	478	
17	M. van den Bos	860	
18	Roelf Hofstee Holtrop	911	
19	J.H. Vrijlandt-Krijnen	962	
20	Joh.D. van Dijk	638	
21	Sch. Overwater	643	
22	D.H. Kok	1,095	
23	H.P. Varenhorst	330	
24	Broos van Erp	1,199	
25	G.J. Selman	171	
26	Max Tripels	4,289	
27	J. Drijber	725	
28	Cees A.J. van Beukering	1,060	
29	J. Stork	612	
30	Lien Vos-van Gortel	426	
31	Nicoline van den Broek-Laman Trip	849	
32	Jaap Scherpenhuizen	404	
33	Govert van Tets	373	
34	Albert-Jan Evenhuis	780	
35	Bokke Algra	599	
36	E. Maris geb. Koster	428	
37	Henk Vonhoff	4,942	
38	Frits Korthals Altes	1,456	
39	Haya van Someren-Downer	12,290	
40	Koos Rietkerk	6,961	
Total		914,787	

== D'66 ==
Candidate list for the Democrats 66
Number	Candidate	Votes	Result
1	Aar de Goede	392,304	Elected
2	Suzanne Dekker	91,949	Elected
3	Herman Schaper	3,180	
4	Doeke Eisma	2,186	Replacement
5	Werner Uerz	1,490	
6	Anton de Man	2,042	
7	Arend Meerburg	1,059	
8	Arie Manten	1,952	
9	Nico Wegter	463	
10	Jan Fokko Wegter	1,203	
11	Hein van Oorschot	941	
12	Bert van Wijk	2,618	
13	Arjen Meij	1,504	
14	Emar Vogelaar	602	
15	Henk Potman	544	
16	Frank Baas	948	
17	Joop Coorengel	2,165	
18	Rik Kuethe	276	
19	Jan van Berkom	1,596	
20	Henk de Goede	1,086	
21	Arnold Balfoort	473	
22	Johan Juurlink	1,386	
Total		511,967	

== S.G.P. ==
Candidate list for the Reformed Political Party
Number	Candidate	Votes	Result
1	Henk van Rossum		
2	Leen van der Waal		
3	P.H.D. van Ree		
4	F.W.J. den Ottolander		
5	A.K. van der Staaij		
6	J. Slagboom		
Total		126,412	

== C.P.N. ==
Candidate list for the Communist Party of the Netherlands
Number	Candidate	Votes	Result
1	Rinus Haks		
2	Tineke van den Klinkenberg		
3	Frits Dragstra		
4	Gijs Schreuders		
5	Heiltje de Vos-Krul		
6	Willem Kremer		
7	Wim van het Schip		
8	Elli Izeboud		
9	Harm Leeman		
10	Trijnie Ahlers geb. Luppens		
11	Hans Geleijnse		
12	Truus Divendal geb. Klok		
13	Johan Bosma		
14	Cor van der Zanden		
15	Cilia Galesloot		
16	Wim Nieuwenhuijse		
17	Rinze Visser		
18	Garl Splinter		
19	Siem van der Helm		
20	Carla Boxma-Viallé		
21	Frans Aarts		
22	Joop Stout		
23	Joop Mantel		
24	Ton van Hoek		
25	Claartje Visser-de Jong		
26	Rudi van der Velde		
27	Joop Schepers		
28	Jan Berghuis		
29	Bep Grave-Spa		
30	Jos de Keijzer		
31	Bob Vrins		
32	Hanneke Jagersma		
33	Laurens Meerten		
34	Arend Luppens		
35	Jaap Janissen		
36	Gerrit Out		
37	Simon Korper		
38	Bertus Faber		
39	Jan van de Meulenhof		
40	Jannie Jongeneel-Ketzer		
Total		97,343	

== P.P.R. ==
Candidate list for the Political Party of Radicals
Number	Candidate	Votes	Result
1	Leo Jansen		
2	Dilia van der Heem-Wagemakers		
3	Ad Melkert		
4	Constant van Waterschoot		
5	Wouter van Doorn		
6	Henk Waltmans		
7	Tine Jager-Lonkhuyzen		
8	Gerritjan van Oven		
9	Boy Trip		
10	Herman Verbeek		
11	Maurits Blanson Henkemans		
12	Egbert Bocker		
13	Marlies ter Borg-Neervoort		
14	Eric-Jan Tuininga		
15	Theo Potma		
16	Michiel van de Kasteelen		
17	Karel van Kesteren		
18	Grietje Pasma		
19	Erik Jurgens		
20	Bas de Gaaij Fortman		
Total		92,055	

== G.P.V. ==
Candidate list for the Reformed Political League
Number	Candidate	Votes	Result
1	Hans Blokland		
2	Gert Schutte		
3	Bart Verbrugh		
4	Jan van der Jagt		
5	W. Haitsma		
6	Jurn de Vries		
7	L. Feijen		
8	P. Cnossen		
9	J.C. Nieuwlaat		
10	S. de Vries		
11	J.A. Knepper		
12	H. van den Berg		
Total		62,610	

== P.S.P. ==
Candidate list for the Pacifist Socialist Party
Number	Candidate	Votes	Result
1	Bouwe Kalma		
2	Titia M. Bos		
3	Joop Vogt		
4	Erik Meijer		
5	Bram van der Lek		
6	Andrée van Es		
7	Rudi Boon		
8	Wim Combrink		
9	Frank Köhler		
10	Fred van der Spek		
11	Jan Muytjens		
12	Pieternel Rol		
13	Jan Bos		
14	Gied ten Berge		
15	Hein van Wijk		
16	Ben Evers		
17	Wilbert Willems		
18	Els Agtsteribbe		
19	Kees Walle		
20	Kees van Laren		
21	Lambert Meertens		
22	Ed van Dalsem		
23	To van Albada		
24	Rob Steinbuch		
25	Sander J. Doeve		
26	Pieterjan Hendriks		
27	Lex Spaans		
28	Jan Knottnerus		
29	Jos Noordhuizen		
30	Hubert Smeets		
31	Peter Korzelius		
32	Wilbert N.H.M. Dekker		
33	Alex Wassenaar		
34	Eric Köhler		
35	Tom Pitstra		
36	Do Kester		
37	Frans A. Kamphuis		
38	Felix O de Vroomen		
39	Rob Scharrenborg		
40	Frans Janssen		
Total		97,243	

== List Leschot ==
Candidate list for List Leschot
Number	Candidate	Votes	Result
1	Winand Leschot	24,903	
Total		24,903	

== Sources ==
- Data of the 1979 European Election by the Electoral Committee
