= List of members of the European Parliament for the Netherlands, 1984–1989 =

In the parliamentary term from 24 July 1984 to 24 July 1989, 27 people were representatives of the Netherlands in the European Parliament. 25 were elected after the 1984 European Parliament election in the Netherlands and were installed at the start of the term.

After the elections, the national parties joined political groups in the European Parliament. The largest delegation, the Labour Party (PvdA, 9 seats), remained in the Socialist Group (SOC). Christian Democratic Appeal (CDA, 8 seats) remained in the European People's Party (EPP), and the People's Party for Freedom and Democracy (VVD, 5 seats) in the Liberal and Democratic Group (LD). The Green Progressive Accord (GPA, 2 seats), a joint list of the Pacifist Socialist Party (PSP), the Political Party of Radicals (PPR) and the Communist Party of the Netherlands (CPN), joined the newly created Rainbow Group (RBW). The joint list of the Reformed Political Party (SGP), the Reformed Political League (GPV) and the Reformatory Political Federation (RPF) won 1 seat, taken by the SGP, which sat with the Non-Inscrits (NI).

== List ==
Name	National party	EP Group	Begin date (Note: Within this parliamentary term. Membership of previous terms is not included.)	End date (Note: Within this parliamentary term. Membership of later terms is not included.)	Ref.
Hedy d'Ancona	PvdA	SOC	24 July 1984	24 July 1989	
Bouke Beumer	CDA	EPP	24 July 1984	24 July 1989	
Elise Boot	CDA	EPP	24 July 1984	24 July 1989	
Bob Cohen	PvdA	SOC	24 July 1984	24 July 1989	
Pam Cornelissen	CDA	EPP	24 July 1984	24 July 1989	
Piet Dankert	PvdA	SOC	24 July 1984	24 July 1989	
Nel van Dijk	CPN (Note: Elected on the joint list of the Green Progressive Accord.)	RBW	31 January 1987	24 July 1989	
Ien van den Heuvel-de Blank	PvdA	SOC	24 July 1984	24 July 1989	
Jim Janssen van Raaij	CDA	EPP	5 November 1986	24 July 1989	
Jessica Larive	VVD	LD	24 July 1984	24 July 1989	
Bram van der Lek	PSP	RBW	24 July 1984	24 July 1989	
Hendrik Jan Louwes	VVD	LD	24 July 1984	24 July 1989	
Hanja Maij-Weggen	CDA	EPP	24 July 1984	24 July 1989	
Alman Metten	PvdA	SOC	24 July 1984	24 July 1989	
Hemmo Muntingh	PvdA	SOC	24 July 1984	24 July 1989	
Hans Nord	VVD	LD	24 July 1984	24 July 1989	
Jean Penders	CDA	EPP	24 July 1984	24 July 1989	
Yvonne van Rooy	CDA	EPP	24 July 1984	28 October 1986	
Teun Tolman	CDA	EPP	24 July 1984	24 July 1989	
Herman Verbeek	PPR	RBW	24 July 1984	16 December 1986	
Wim Vergeer	CDA	EPP	24 July 1984	24 July 1989	
Phili Viehoff	PvdA	SOC	24 July 1984	24 July 1989	
Ben Visser	PvdA	SOC	24 July 1984	24 July 1989	
Gijs de Vries	VVD	LD	24 July 1984	24 July 1989	
Leen van der Waal	SGP (Note: Elected on the joint list of the SGP, GPV and RPF.)	NI	24 July 1984	24 July 1989	
Florus Wijsenbeek	VVD	LD	24 July 1984	24 July 1989	
Eisso Woltjer	PvdA	SOC	24 July 1984	24 July 1989	
