= List of members of the European Parliament for the Netherlands, 1979–1984 =

Below is a list of the 25 members of the European Parliament for the Netherlands in the 1979 to 1984 session.

== Party representation ==
| National party | EP Group | Seats |
|---|---|---|
| Christian Democratic Appeal | EPP | 10 / 25 |
| Labour Party | SOC | 9 / 25 |
| People's Party for Freedom and Democracy | LD | 4 / 25 |
| Democrats 66 | NI | 2 / 25 |

== List ==
MEPs for the Netherlands elected to the 1st European Parliament session
| Name | Sex | National party | EP Group | Period |
|---|---|---|---|---|
| Wim Albers | Male | Labour Party | SOC | 17 July 1979 – 24 July 1984 |
| Cees Berkhouwer | Male | People's Party for Freedom and Democracy | LD | 17 July 1979 – 24 July 1984 |
| Bouke Beumer | Male | Christian Democratic Appeal | EPP | 17 July 1979 – 19 July 1994 |
| Elise Boot | Female | Christian Democratic Appeal | EPP | 17 July 1979 – 24 July 1989 |
| Bob Cohen | Male | Labour Party | SOC | 17 July 1979 – 24 July 1989 |
| Piet Dankert | Male | Labour Party | SOC | 17 July 1979 – 7 November 1989 |
| Suzanne Dekker | Female | Democrats 66 | NI | 17 July 1979 – 10 June 1981 |
| Doeke Eisma | Male | Democrats 66 | NI | 19 June 1981 – 23 July 1984 |
| Aart Geurtsen | Male | People's Party for Freedom and Democracy | LD | 17 July 1979 – July 1984 |
| Aar de Goede | Male | Democrats 66 | NI | 17 July 1979 – 24 July 1984 |
| Frans van der Gun | Male | Christian Democratic Appeal | EPP | 17 July 1979 – 1 January 1982 |
| Ien van den Heuvel-de Blank | Female | Labour Party | SOC | 17 July 1979 – 24 July 1989 |
| Sjouke Jonker | Male | Christian Democratic Appeal | EPP | 17 July 1979 – 24 July 1984 |
| Annie Krouwel-Vlam | Female | Labour Party | SOC | 17 July 1979 – 23 July 1984 |
| Hendrik Jan Louwes | Male | People's Party for Freedom and Democracy | LD | 17 July 1979 – 24 July 1989 |
| Hanja Maij-Weggen | Female | Christian Democratic Appeal | EPP | 17 July 1979 – 6 November 1989 |
| Johan van Minnen | Male | Labour Party | SOC | 17 July 1979 – 24 July 1984 |
| Joep Mommersteeg | Male | Christian Democratic Appeal | EPP | 15 February 1982 – 24 July 1984 |
| Hemmo Muntingh | Male | Labour Party | SOC | 17 July 1979 – 19 July 1994 |
| Hans Nord | Male | People's Party for Freedom and Democracy | LD | 17 July 1979 – 24 July 1989 |
| Harry Notenboom | Male | Christian Democratic Appeal | EPP | 17 July 1979 – July 1984 |
| Jean Penders | Male | Christian Democratic Appeal | EPP | 17 July 1979 – 19 July 1994 |
| Jim Janssen van Raaij | Male | Christian Democratic Appeal | EPP | 17 July 1979 – 24 July 1984; October 1986 – 20 July 1999 |
| Teun Tolman | Male | Christian Democratic Appeal | EPP | 17 July 1979 – 24 July 1989 |
| Wim Vergeer | Male | Christian Democratic Appeal | EPP | 17 July 1979 – 24 July 1989 |
| Phili Viehoff | Female | Labour Party | SOC | December 1979 – 24 July 1989 |
| Anne Vondeling | Male | Labour Party | SOC | 17 July 1979 – 22 November 1979 |
| Eisso Woltjer | Male | Labour Party | SOC | 17 July 1979 – 19 July 1994 |

== Mutations ==
=== 1979 ===
- 7 June: Election for the European Parliament in the Netherlands.
- 17 July: Begin 1st European Parliament session. (1979-1984)
- 22 November: Anne Vondeling (PvdA) dies after a traffic accident.
- 29 November: Phili Viehoff (PvdA) is installed in the European Parliament as a replacement for Anne Vondeling.

=== 1981 ===
- 10 June: Suzanne Dekker (D66) leaves the European Parliament, taking her seat in the Dutch Parliament after the 1981 Dutch general election.
- 19 June: Doeke Eisma (D66) is installed in the European Parliament as a replacement for Suzanne Dekker.

=== 1982 ===
- 1 January: Frans van der Gun (CDA) leaves the European Parliament.
- 15 February: Joep Mommersteeg (CDA) is installed in the European Parliament as a replacement for Frans van der Gun.
