= List of Christian Democratic Appeal members of the European Parliament =

This is a list of all (former) Members of the European Parliament for the Christian Democratic Appeal (CDA).

== List ==
Name	Start	End	Ref
Tom Berendsen	2 July 2019	22 February 2026	
Bouke Beumer	17 July 1979	18 July 1994	
Elise Boot	17 July 1979	23 July 1989	
Cees Bremmer	8 October 2003	19 July 2004	
Wim van de Camp	14 July 2009	1 July 2019	
Pam Cornelissen	24 July 1984	19 July 1999	
Bert Doorn	20 July 1999	13 July 2009	
Camiel Eurlings	20 July 2004	21 February 2007	
Gaius de Gaay Fortman	13 March 1978	14 July 1979	
Frans van der Gun	17 July 1979	31 December 1981	
Jim Janssen van Raaij	17 July 1979	23 July 1984	
Jim Janssen van Raaij	5 November 1986	1 December 1996	
Sjouke Jonker	17 July 1979	23 July 1984	
Willemien Koning-Hoeve	3 March 2026		
Ingeborg ter Laak	16 July 2024		
Esther de Lange	12 April 2007	15 February 2024	
Jeroen Lenaers	1 July 2014		
Albert Jan Maat	20 July 1999	9 April 2007	
Hanja Maij-Weggen	17 July 1979	5 November 1989	
Hanja Maij-Weggen	19 July 1994	30 September 2003	
Toine Manders	2 June 2020	15 July 2024	
Maria Martens	20 July 1999	13 July 2009	
Joep Mommersteeg	15 February 1982	23 July 1984	
Lambert van Nistelrooij	20 July 2004	1 July 2019	
Harry Notenboom	19 January 1978	23 July 1984	
Ria Oomen	25 July 1989	1 July 2014	
Arie Oostlander	25 July 1989	19 July 2004	
Henk Jan Ormel	27 February 2024	15 July 2024	
Karla Peijs	25 July 1989	26 May 2003	
Jean Penders	17 July 1979	18 July 1994	
Peter Pex	19 July 1994	19 July 1999	
Peter Pex	11 June 2003	19 July 2004	
Joop Post	1 March 2007	15 October 2007	
Bartho Pronk	20 November 1989	19 July 2004	
Yvonne van Rooy	24 July 1984	27 October 1986	
Annie Schreijer-Pierik	1 July 2014	15 July 2024	
Jan Sonneveld	25 July 1989	19 July 1999	
Teun Tolman	19 January 1978	23 July 1989	
Wim Vergeer	19 January 1978	23 July 1989	
Maxime Verhagen	25 July 1989	18 July 1994	
Wim van Velzen	19 July 1994	19 July 2004	
Cornelis Visser	17 October 2007	13 July 2009	
Corien Wortmann	20 July 2004	1 July 2014	
