= List of members of the European Parliament for France, 1979–1984 =

Members of the European Parliament from France
ECSC delegation	(1952)
EP delegation	(1958)
1st term	(1979)
2nd term	(1984)
3rd term	(1989)
4th term	(1994)
5th term	(1999)
6th term	(2004)
7th term	(2009)
8th term	(2014)
9th term	(2019)
10th term	(2024)

This is a list of the 81 members of the European Parliament for France in the 1979 to 1984 session.

== List ==
Name	National party	EP Group	Constituency
Gisèle Bochenek-Forray	Socialist Party	S	
Édith Cresson	Socialist Party	S	
Jacques Delors	Socialist Party	S	
Claude Estier	Socialist Party	S	
Maurice Faure	Radical Party of the Left	S	
Yvette Fuillet	Socialist Party	S	
Françoise Gaspard	Socialist Party	S	
Gérard Jaquet	Socialist Party	S	
Charles Josselin	Socialist Party	S	
Charles-Emile Loo	Socialist Party	S	
Gilles Martinet	Socialist Party	S	
Pierre Mauroy	Socialist Party	S	
Jacques Moreau	Socialist Party	S	
Didier Motchane	Socialist Party	S	
Jean Oehler	Socialist Party	S	
Daniel Percheron	Socialist Party	S	
Georges Sarre	Socialist Party	S	
Roger-Gérard Schwartzenberg	Radical Party of the Left	S	
Georges Sutra de Germa	Socialist Party	S	
Marie-Claude Vayssade	Socialist Party	S	
Yvette Roudy	Socialist Party	S	
Gustave Ansart	Communist Party	COM	
Louis Baillot	Communist Party	COM	
Robert Chambeiron	Communist Party	COM	
Félix Damette	Communist Party	COM	
Danielle de March-Ronco	Communist Party	COM	
Jacques Denis	Communist Party	COM	
Guy Fernandez	Communist Party	COM	
Georges Frischmann	Communist Party	COM	
Maxime Gremetz	Communist Party	COM	
Jacqueline Hoffmann	Communist Party	COM	
Emmanuel Maffre-Baugé	Communist Party	COM	
Georges Marchais	Communist Party	COM	
Maurice Martin	Communist Party	COM	
Sylvie Mayer	Communist Party	COM	
René-Emile Piquet	Communist Party	COM	
Henriette Poirier	Communist Party	COM	
Pierre-Benjamin Pranchère	Communist Party	COM	
Paul Vergès	Communist Party	COM	
Francis Wurtz	Communist Party	COM	
Hubert Jean Buchou (until 30 September 1980) Pierre-Bernard Cousté (from 13 October 1980)	Defense of French Interests in Europe	EPD	
Jacques Chirac (until 28 April 1980) Gérard Israël (from 16 May 1980)	Defense of French Interests in Europe	EPD	
Nicole Chouraqui (until 16 October 1980) François-Marie Geronimi (from 17 October 1980)	Defense of French Interests in Europe	EPD	
Michel Debré (until 30 September 1980) Marie-Madeleine Fourcade (from 13 October 1980 to 17 September 1981) Xavier Deniau (from 18 September 1981 to 14 April 1983) Jacqueline Nebout (from 25 April 1983)	Defense of French Interests in Europe	EPD	
Vincent Ansquer	Defense of French Interests in Europe	EPD	
Gustave Deleau	Defense of French Interests in Europe	EPD	
Marie-Madeleine Dienesch (until 30 September 1980) Jean de Lipkowski (from 13 October 1980 to 15 December 1981) René Paulhan (from 16 December 1981 to 09 March 1983) Marie-Claire Scamaroni (from 11 March 1983)	Defense of French Interests in Europe	EPD	
Maurice Druon (until 20 June 1980) André Fanton (from 26 June 1980 to 16 April 1982) André Bord (from 19 April 1982)	Defense of French Interests in Europe	EPD	
Alain Gillot (until 30 September 1980) André Turcat (from 13 October 1980 to 17 September 1981) Jean Méo (from 18 September 1981 to 30 September 1982) Magdeleine Anglade (from 06 October 1982 to 18 November 1983)	Defense of French Interests in Europe (until 30 September 1982) National Centre of Independents and Peasants (from 06 October 1982 to 18 November 1983)	EPD	
Claude Labbé (until 09 July 1980) Jean-José Clément (from 11 July 1980 to 15 February 1982) Jean Mouchel (from 16 February 1982 to 30 September 1983) Hector Rolland (from 01 October 1983)	Defense of French Interests in Europe	EPD	
Christian de la Malène	Defense of French Interests in Europe	EPD	
Pierre Messmer (until 27 June 1980) Maurice Doublet (from 01 July 1980 to 18 June 1981) Michel Junot (from 19 June 1981 to 12 January 1983) Roger Gauthier (from 13 January 1983)	Defense of French Interests in Europe	EPD	
Christian Poncelet (until 30 September 1980) Daniel Vié (from 13 October 1980)	Defense of French Interests in Europe	EPD	
Eugène Remilly	Defense of French Interests in Europe	EPD	
Louise Weiss (until 26 May 1983) Hugues Tatilon (from 27 May 1983 to 24 July 1983) Gabriel Kaspereit (from 25 July 1983)	Defense of French Interests in Europe	EPD	
Henri Caillavet	Union for France	L (until 04 May 1982) S	
Corentin Calvez	Union for France	L	
Francis Combe (until 15 April 1982) Jean-Thomas Nordmann (from 16 April 1982)	Union for France	L	
Charles Delatte	Union for France	L	
Robert Delorozoy	Union for France	L	
Georges Donnez	Union for France	L	
Edgar Faure	Union for France	L	
Yves Galland	Union for France	L	
Simone Martin	Union for France	L	
Jean-François Pintat	Union for France	L	
Michel Poniatowski	Union for France	L	
Marie-Jane Pruvot	Union for France	L	
André Rossi	Union for France	L	
Victor Sablé	Union for France	L	
Christiane Scrivener	Union for France	L	
Simone Veil	Union for France	L	
Pierre Baudis	Union for France	L (until 31 December 1980) EPP	
Francisque Collomb	Union for France	EPP	
Michel Debatisse (until 23 October 1979) Edgard Pisani (from 24 October 1979)	Union for France (until 23 October 1979) Socialist Party (from 24 October 1979)	EPP (until 23 October 1979) S (from 24 October 1979)	
André Diligent	Union for France	EPP	
Jean Lecanuet	Union for France	EPP	
Olivier d'Ormesson	Union for France	EPP	
Louise Moreau	Union for France	EPP	
Pierre Pflimlin	Union for France	EPP	
Jean Seitlinger	Union for France	EPP	
Maurice-René Simonnet	Union for France	EPP	
