= List of Dutch Labour Party members of the European Parliament =

This is a list of all (former) Member of the European Parliament for the Labour Party (PvdA)

== Seats in the European Parliament ==
=== Labour Party ===
Election year	List	# of votes	% of overall vote	# of seats won	Change	Notes
1979	List	1,722,240	30.39% (#2)	9 / 25		
1984	List	1,785,165	33.70% (#1)	9 / 25	0	
1989	List	1,609,626	30.70% (#2)	8 / 25	1 ▼	
1994	List	945,869	22.88% (#2)	8 / 31	0	
1999	List	712,929	20.11% (#2)	6 / 31	2 ▼	
2004	List	1,124,549	23.60% (#2)	7 / 27	1 ▲	
2009	List	548,691	12.05% (#3)	3 / 25	4 ▼	
2014	List	446,763	9.40% (#6)	3 / 26	0	
2019	List	1,045,274	19.01% (#1)	6 / 26	3 ▲	

=== GroenLinks–PvdA ===
Election year	List	# of votes	% of overall vote	# of seats won	Change	Notes
2024	List	1,314,428	21.09 (#1)	8 / 31	▼1 (Note: Compared to the totals of PvdA and GroenLinks in 2019.)	

== Alphabetical ==
=== Delegation members of the European Coal and Steel Community Parliament (from 1952-58) ===
Delegation member	Sex	Period	Photo
Paul Kapteijn	Male	from 10 September 1952 till 10 October 1956	
Marinus van der Goes van Naters	Male	from 10 September 1952 till 1 January 1958	
Gerard Nederhorst	Male	from 10 September 1952 till 1 January 1958	

=== Delegation members of the European Parliament (1958-79) ===
Delegation member	Sex	Period	Photo
Wim Albers	Male	from 3 October 1974 till 17 July 1979	
Nel Barendregt	Female	from 13 March 1973 till 4 June 1973	
Jan Broeksz	Male	from 16 November 1970 till 15 July 1979	
Jaap Burger	Male	from 20 October 1966 till 29 September 1970	
Marinus van der Goes van Naters	Male	from 1 January 1958 till 7 May 1967	
Arie van der Hek	Male	from 3 July 1973 till 17 October 1977	
Reint Laan	Male	from 16 June 1965 till 1 March 1968	
Cees Laban	Male	from 3 July 1973 till 5 September 1977	
Jan Lamberts	Male	from 24 October 1977 till 17 July 1979	
Gerard Nederhorst	Male	from 1 January 1958 till 29 September 1965	
Ad Oele	Male	from 21 October 1965 till 16 January 1973	
Schelto Patijn	Male	from 3 July 1973 till 16 July 1979	
Siep Posthumus	Male	from 19 March 1958 till 24 May 1965 from 11 May 1968 till 15 September 1971	
Jan Pronk	Male	from 13 March 1973 till 11 May 1973	
Max van der Stoel	Male	from 22 September 1971 till 11 May 1973	
Henk Vredeling	Male	from 19 March 1958 till 11 May 1973	
Ep Wieldraaijer	Male	from 3 July 1973 till 19 September 1974	

=== Elected members of the European Parliament (from 1979) ===
Current members of the European Parliament are in bold.

Delegation member	Sex	Period	Photo
Wim Albers	Male	from 03-10-1974 till 23-07-1984	
Hedy d'Ancona	Female	from 24-07-1984 till 07-11-1989 from 19-07-1994 till 19-07-1999	
Nel Barendregt	Female	from 13-03-1973 till 04-06-1973	
Max van den Berg	Male	from 19-07-1999 till 01-09-2007	
Thijs Berman	Male	from 20-07-2004 till 30-06-2014	
Leonie van Bladel	Female	from 19-07-1994 till 19-07-1999	
Emine Bozkurt	Female	from 20-07-2004 till 30-06-2014	
Mathilde van den Brink	Female	from 20-11-1989 till 23-07-1984	
Jan Broeksz	Male	from 16-11-1970 till 15-07-1979	
Ieke van den Burg	Female	from 19-07-1999 till 13-07-2009	
Jaap Burger	Male	from 20-10-1966 till 29-09-1970	
Frits Castricum	Male	from 19-07-1994 till 19-07-1999	
**Mohammed Chahim**	Male	from 02-07-2019 till present	
Jan Cremers	Male	from 08-05-2008 till 13-07-2009	
Bob Cohen	Male	from 17-07-1979 till 23-07-1989	
Dorette Corbey	Female	from 19-07-1999 till 13-07-2009	
Piet Dankert	Male	from 17-07-1979 till 07-11-1989 from 19-07-1994 till 19-07-1999	
Annemarie Goedmakers	Female	from 20-11-1989 till 23-07-1984	
Marinus van der Goes van Naters	Female	from 01-01-1958 till 07-05-1967	
Arie van der Hek	Male	from 03-07-1973 till 17-10-1977	
Ien van den Heuvel	Female	from 17-07-1979 till 23-07-1989	
Michiel van Hulten	Male	from 19-07-1999 till 19-07-2004	
Lily Jacobs	Female	from 04-09-2007 till 13-07-2009	
Agnes Jongerius	Female	from 01-07-2014 till 15-07-2024	
Paul Kapteijn	Male	from 01-01-1958 till 20-10-1966	
Annie Krouwel-Vlam	Female	from 18-10-1977 till 23-07-1984	
Reint Laan	Male	from 16-06-1965 till 01-03-1968	
Cees Laban	Male	from 03-07-1973 till 05-09-1977	
Jan Lamberts	Male	from 24-10-1977 till 17-07-1979	
**Marit Maij**	Female	from 16-7-2024 till present	
Edith Mastenbroek	Female	from 20-07-2004 till 20-04-2008	
Judith Merkies	Female	from 14-07-2009 till 30-06-2014	
Alman Metten	Male	from 24-07-1984 till 19-07-1999	
Johan van Minnen	Male	from 17-07-1979 till 23-07-1984	
Hemmo Muntingh	Male	from 17-07-1979 till 18-07-1994	
Gerard Nederhorst	Male	from 01-01-1958 till 29-09-1965	
Ad Oele	Male	from 21-10-1965 till 16-01-1973	
Schelto Patijn	Male	from 03-07-1973 till 16-07-1979	
Kati Piri	Female	from 01-07-2014 till 30-03-2021	
Siep Posthumus	Male	from 19-03-1958 till 24-05-1965 from 11-05-1968 till 15-09-1971	
Jan Pronk	Male	from 13-03-1973 till 11-05-1973	
Maartje van Putten	Female	from 24-07-1989 till 19-07-1999	
**Thijs Reuten**	Male	from 15-04-2021 till present	
Max van der Stoel	Male	from 22-09-1971 till 11-05-1973	
Joke Swiebel	Female	from 19-07-1999 till 19-07-2004	
Paul Tang	Male	from 01-07-2014 till 15-07-2024	
Vera Tax	Female	from 02-07-2019 till 15-07-2024	
Wim van Velzen	Male	from 24-07-1989 till 19-07-1999	
Phili Viehoff	Female	from 29-11-1979 till 23-07-1989	
Ben Visser	Male	from 24-07-1984 till 18-07-1994	
Anne Vondeling	Male	from 17-07-1979 till 22-11-1979	
Henk Vredeling	Male	from 19-03-1958 till 11-05-1973	
Ep Wieldraaijer	Male	from 03-07-1973 till 19-09-1974	
Jan Marinus Wiersma	Male	from 19-07-1994 till 13-07-2009	
**Lara Wolters**	Female	from 04-07-2019 till present	
Eisso Woltjer	Male	from 17-07-1979 till 18-07-1994	
