= 2004 Upper Normandy regional election =

French regional election

- 21 March 2004 (first round); 28 March 2004 (second round)

All 55 seats in the Regional Council of Normandy
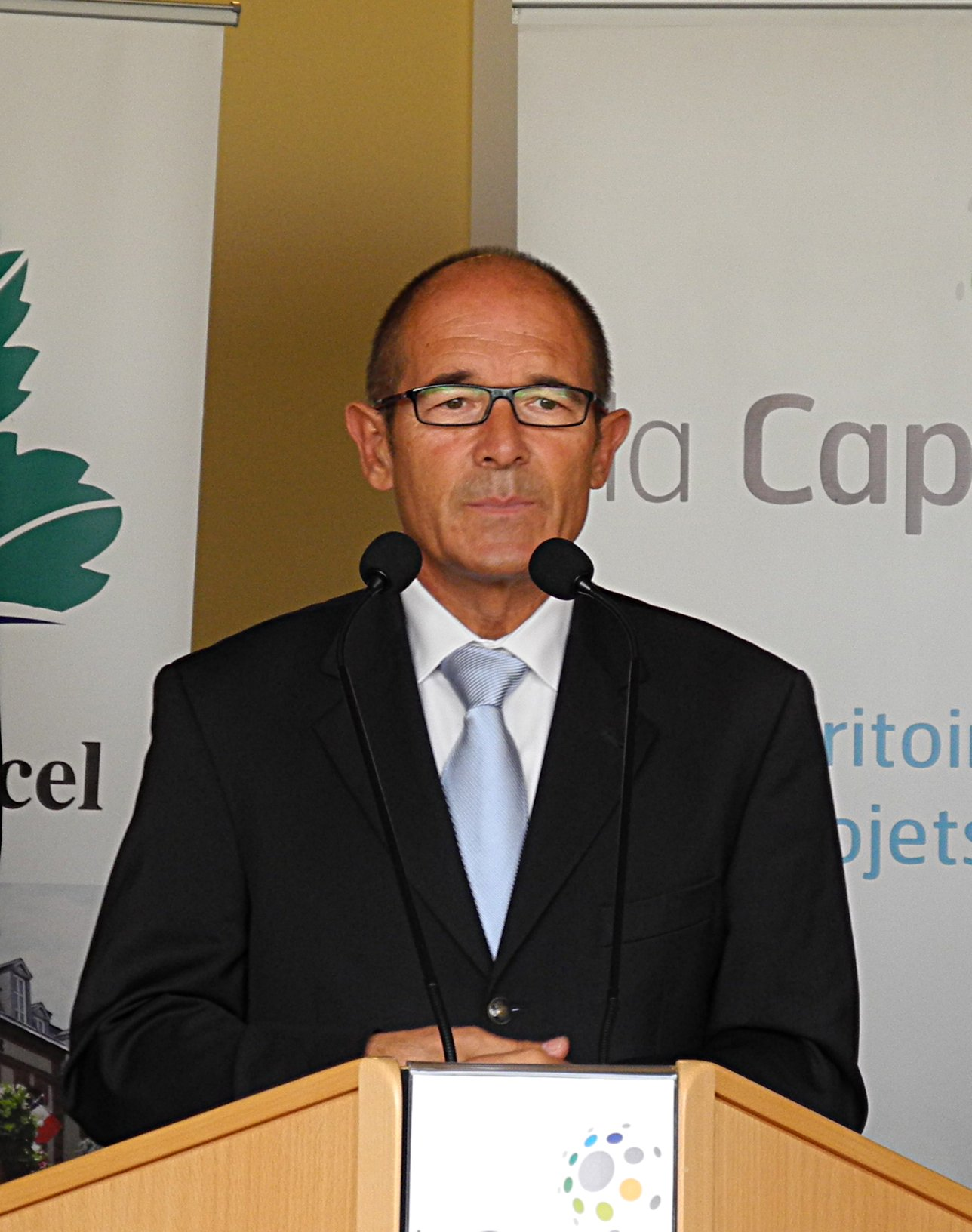

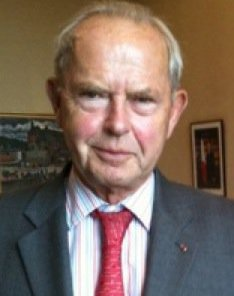
	First party	Second party	Third party
Leader	Alain Le Vern	Antoine Rufenacht	Dominique Chaboche
Party	PS	UMP	FN
Seats won	36	13	6
Popular vote	408,237	253,478	112,937
Percentage	52.69%	32.72%	14.59%

A regional election took place in Upper Normandy on 21 March and 28 March 2004, along with all other regions. Alain Le Vern (PS) was re-elected President of the Council.

== Results ==
Party	Presidential candidate	First round		Second round		Seats
Party	Presidential candidate	Votes	%	Votes	%	Seats
PS–PCF–PRG–Verts	Alain Le Vern	281,320	38.86	408,237	52.70	36
UMP–MPF	Antoine Rufenacht	153,089	21.15	253,478	32.72	13
FN	Dominique Chaboche	115,183	15.91	112,937	14.58	6
UDF–CAP21	Hervé Morin	90,505	12.50			0
LCR–LO	Christine Poupin	40,434	5.59			0
MEI–GE	Bernard Frau	30,202	4.17			0
MNR	Philippe Foucher-Saillenfest	13,124	1.81			0
Total		723,857	100.00	774,652	100.00	55
Valid votes		723,857	95.66	774,652	96.80	
Invalid/blank votes		32,857	4.34	25,626	3.20	
Total votes		756,714	100.00	800,278	100.00	
Registered voters/turnout		1,219,975	62.03	1,220,008	65.60	
Source: Ministry of the Interior Delwit
