= List of Christian Union – Reformed Political Party members of the European Parliament =

This is a list of all (former) Member of the European Parliament for the Christian Union – Reformed Political Party (CU-SGP)

== Seats in the European Parliament ==
Results for Christian Union-SGP common list. Participated as SGP/RPF/GPV, before 2004

| Election year | List | # of overall votes | % of overall vote | # of overall seats won | +/– | Notes |
|---|---|---|---|---|---|---|
| 1984 | List | 275,786 | 5.21 (#5) | 1 / 25 | 1 ▲ | |
| 1989 | List | 309,060 | 5.90 (#6) | 1 / 25 | 0 | |
| 1994 | List | 322,793 | 7.81 (#5) | 2 / 31 | 1 ▲ | |
| 1999 | List | 309,612 | 8.74 (#5) | 3 / 31 | 1 ▲ | |
| 2004 | List | 279,880 | 5.87 (#7) | 2 / 27 | 1 ▼ | |
| 2009 | List | 310,540 | 6.82 (#8) | 2 / 25 | 0 | |
| 2014 | List | 364,843 | 7.67 (#7) | 2 / 26 | 0 | |
| 2019 | List | 375,660 | 6.83 (#7) | 2 / 26 | 0 | |

=== SGP ===
Reformed Political Party (SGP)

| Election year | List | # of overall votes | % of overall vote | # of overall seats won | Notes |
|---|---|---|---|---|---|
| 1979 | List | 126,412 | 2.23 (#5) | 0 / 25 | |
| 2024 | List | 228,036 | 3.66 (#10) | 1 / 31 | |

=== GPV ===
Reformed Political Alliance (GPV)

| Election year | List | # of overall votes | % of overall vote | # of overall seats won | Notes |
|---|---|---|---|---|---|
| 1979 | List | 62,610 | 1.10 (#9) | 0 / 25 | |

=== CU ===
Christian Union (CU)

| Election year | List | # of overall votes | % of overall vote | # of overall seats won | Notes |
|---|---|---|---|---|---|
| 2024 | List | 180,060 | 2.89 (#11) | 0 / 31 | |

== Alphabetical ==
=== Elected members of the European Parliament (from 1979) ===
Current members of the European Parliament are in bold.

==== SGP ====
| European Parliament member | Sex | Period | Photo |
|---|---|---|---|
| Bas Belder | Male | from 20 July 1999 till 2 July 2019 | |
| Leen van der Waal | Male | from 24 July 1984 till 1 September 1997 | |
| **Bert-Jan Ruissen** | Male | from 2 July 2019 till present | |

==== CU ====
GPV or RPF before 2004.

| European Parliament member | Sex | Period | Group | Photo |
|---|---|---|---|---|
| Hans Blokland | Male | from 19 July 1994 till 13 July 2009 | GPV and CU | |
| Peter van Dalen | Male | from 14 July 2009 till 3 September 2023 | CU | |
| Rijk van Dam | Male | from 1 September 1997 till 19 July 2004 | RPF | |
| Anja Haga | Female | from 5 September 2023 till 15 July 2024 | CU | |
