= List of members of the European Parliament for Luxembourg, 1984–1989 =

This is a list of the 6 members of the European Parliament for Luxembourg in the 1984 to 1989 session.

== List ==
Name	National party	EP Group
Victor Abens	Socialist Workers' Party	SOC
Nicolas Estgen	Christian Social People's Party	EPP
Colette Flesch (Note: Resigned in 1985. Replaced by Lydie Polfer on 9 October 1985.)	Democratic Party	LD (1984–1985) / LDR
Marcelle Lentz-Cornette	Christian Social People's Party	EPP
Ernest Mühlen	Christian Social People's Party	EPP
Lydie Schmit (Note: Died in 1988. Replaced by Jos Wohlfart on 28 April 1988.)	Socialist Workers' Party	SOC

=== Party representation ===
National party	EP Group	Seats	±
Christian Social People's Party	EPP	3 / 6	Steady
Socialist Workers' Party	PES	2 / 6	▲1
Democratic Party	LD	1 / 6	▼1
