= Frédéric Leturque =

French politician (born 1968)

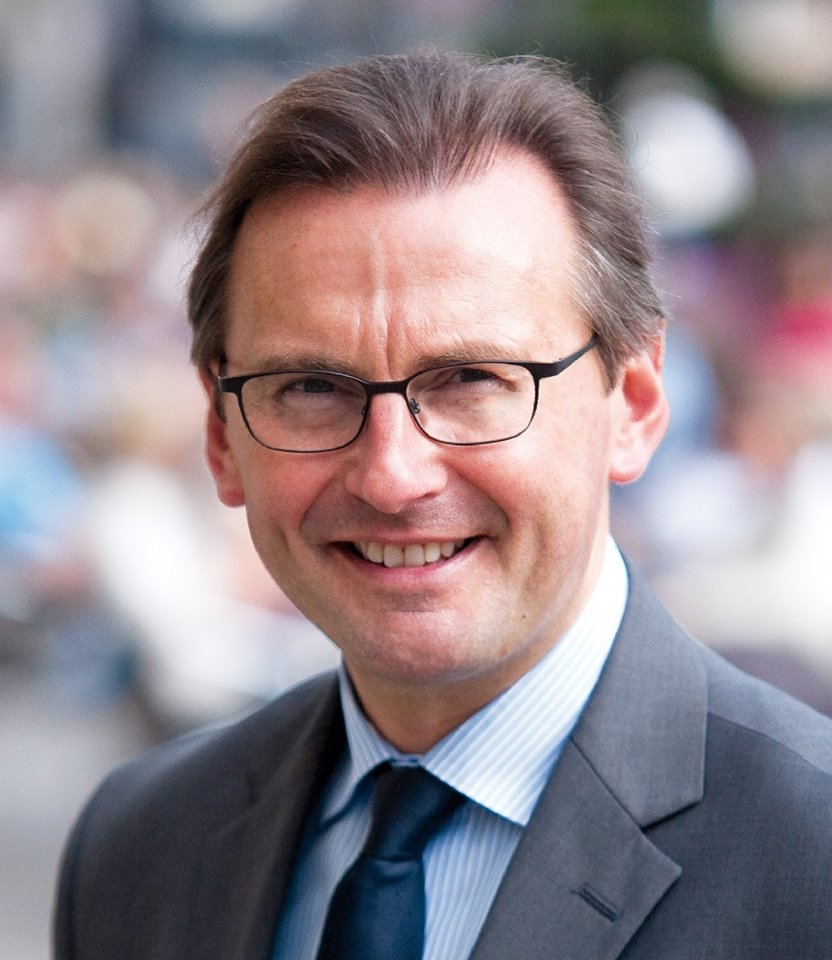
- Leturque in 2015

Mayor of Arras
- Incumbent
- Assumed office 14 November 2011
- Preceded by: Jean-Marie Vanlerenberghe

Personal details
- Born: 10 September 1968 (age 57)
- Party: The Centrists (since 2017)

Frédéric Leturque (born 10 September 1968) is a French politician serving as mayor of Arras since 2011. He concurrently serves as president of the Communauté urbaine d'Arras since 2020. He has been a member of the Regional Council of Hauts-de-France since 2016, and was a member of the Regional Council of Nord-Pas-de-Calais from 2004 to 2010.
