= Wilbert Willems =

Dutch politician

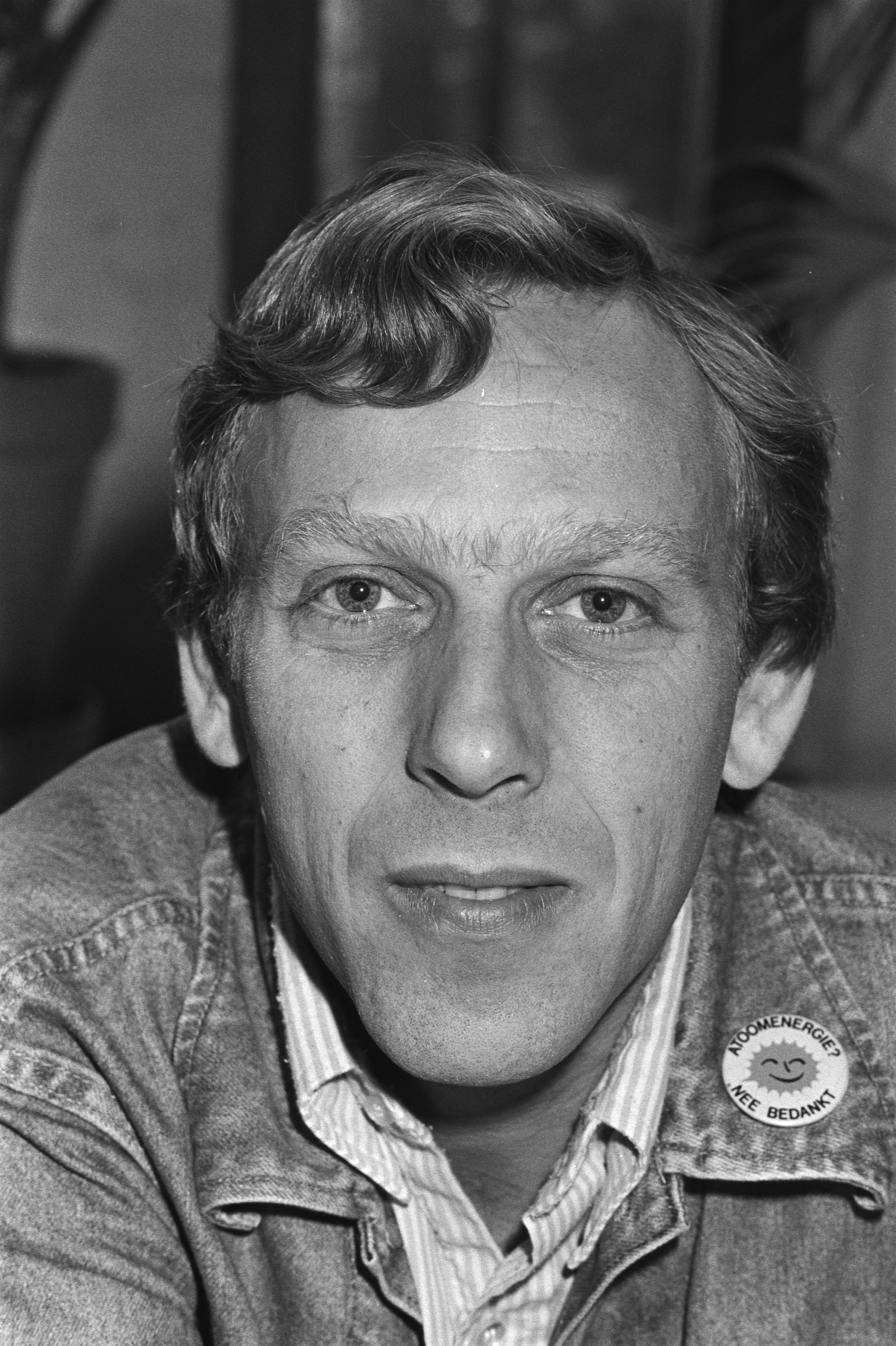
- Wilbert Willems in 1981

Member of the House of Representatives
- In office 10 June 1981 – 3 June 1986
- In office 14 September 1989 – 17 May 1994

Personal details
- Born: Wilbert Jan Willems; 2 November 1946 (age 79) Tilburg, Netherlands
- Party: PSP (1973-1991); GroenLinks (from 1990)
- Spouse: Snjezana Matijevic
- Children: 4
- Education: Tilburg University

Wilbert Jan Willems (born 2 November 1946) is a Dutch former politician. He was a member of the Dutch House of Representatives from 1981 to 1986 and from 1989 to 1994, his first term for the Pacifist Socialist Party (PSP) and his second for GroenLinks. He has also occupied various positions in local and provincial government for both parties.

== Biography ==
Wilbert Jan Willems was born on 2 November 1946 in Tilburg. He studied law at the Katholieke Hogeschool Tilburg, today known as Tilburg University, from 1965 to 1968. He was general secretary of the Catholic Youth Council of the Netherlands from 1973 to 1977. He first entered into politics as a member of the municipal council of Tilburg for the Pacifist Socialist Party (PSP), serving from 1974 to 1978.

Willems was first elected to the House of Representatives in the 1981 Dutch general election for the PSP. As an MP, he was a spokesperson on internal affairs, the environment and housing. In 1983, he proposed a law which would have shortened the length of alternative civilian service for draft refusers, but despite broad support left-wing support he faced opposition from within his party, with PSP parliamentary leader Fred van der Spek criticising the law for not going far enough. In 1984 the proposal was withdrawn.

Although he left the House of Representatives after the 1986 Dutch general election, in 1989 he was again elected as MP, this time for GroenLinks, into which the PSP had merged, leaving his seat again in 1994. From 1987 to 1989 he was a member of the North Brabant provincial council, where he served as leader of the Links Brabant faction, which included the PSP. In 1988 he graduated from the Catholic University Brabant in Tilburg with a degree in law.

In 2006, Willems became alderman in Breda, responsible for culture, infrastructure, and environmental affairs. During his term, he focused on various issues, including efforts to have Breda declared European Capital of Culture, to build a biomass power plant and to improve bike parking. In 2012, Willems resigned as alderman due to a "lack of trust" from the municipal council.

He is married to Snjezana Matijevic, and they have had four children together.
