= Jan Reijnen =

Dutch politician (1927–2020)

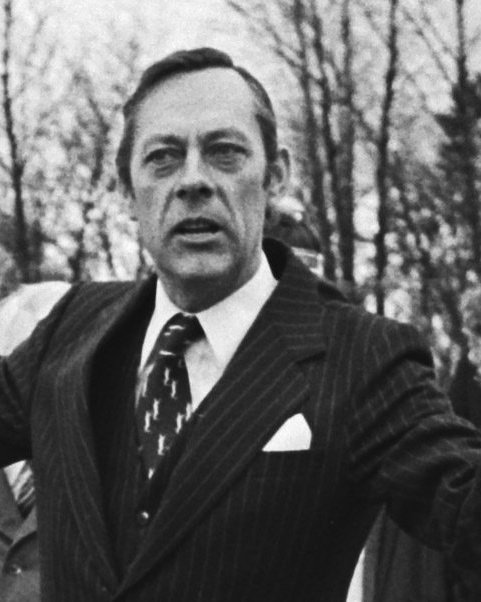
Reijnen (1978)

Jan Reijnen (3 February 1927 in Kaatsheuvel – 7 April 2020 in Vught) was a Dutch politician of the Catholic People's Party and later the Christian Democratic Appeal. He was mayor of Wervershoof (1964–1969), Oldenzaal (1969–1976) and Heerlen (1976–1986). He was a member of the Senate from 16 May 1972 until 20 September 1977.
