= Léon Fatous =

French politician (1926–2023)

Member of the French Senate for Pas-de-Calais
- In office 1 October 1992 – 1 October 2001

Mayor of Arras
- In office 1975–1995
- Preceded by: Guy Mollet
- Succeeded by: Jean-Marie Vanlerenberghe

Member of the European Parliament
- In office 1984–1989

Personal details
- Born: 11 February 1926 Dainville, Pas-de-Calais, France
- Died: 24 September 2023 (aged 97) Arras, France
- Party: Socialist Party

Léon Fatous (11 February 1926 – 24 September 2023) was a French politician who served as a Member of the European Parliament and as a Senator. Fatous died on 24 September 2023, at the age of 97.
