= Anne-Marie Dupuy =

French politician (1920 – 2008)

Anne-Marie Dupuy (18 September 1920 – 19 September 2008) was a French politician of the Rally for the Republic (RPR). After serving as chief of cabinet for Georges Pompidou as prime minister and president of France, she was named to the Conseil d'État in 1974, as its first woman member. She was the mayor of Cannes from 1983 to 1989 and a Member of the European Parliament from 1984 to 1988.

== Biography ==
Dupuy was born in Pithiviers in Loiret and graduated with a law degree. Aged 22, she joined the forces of Free France, serving as an ambulance driver.

After World War II, Dupuy met Georges Pompidou, and became his cabinet chief when he was named prime minister of France in 1963. She maintained the same role when he became president of France in 1969. When Pompidou died in 1974, she left the executive and became the first woman named to the Conseil d'État, France's highest court.

Dupuy met Jacques Chirac, who made her the deputy secretary-general and then the national treasurer of his Rally for the Republic (RPR) party. She first took part in the 1978 French legislative election, being defeated, but won a cantonal election in 1982 and was elected mayor of Cannes in 1983 and a Member of the European Parliament in 1984.

Dupuy served one term each as mayor and MEP. In the 1989 French municipal elections, she competed against Michel Mouillot of the Republican Party. Mouillot's initial victory was quashed by the Conseil d'État for defamatory comments he made about her public and private lives. These attacks, and RPR's attempts to ally with Mouillot in the re-run, led her to quit the party, though she served as a cantonal councillor until 1994. She dedicated the remainder of her life to writing.

In September 2018, the Square Saint-Nicolas in Cannes was renamed after Dupuy.
