= Jean-Marie Alexandre =

French politician

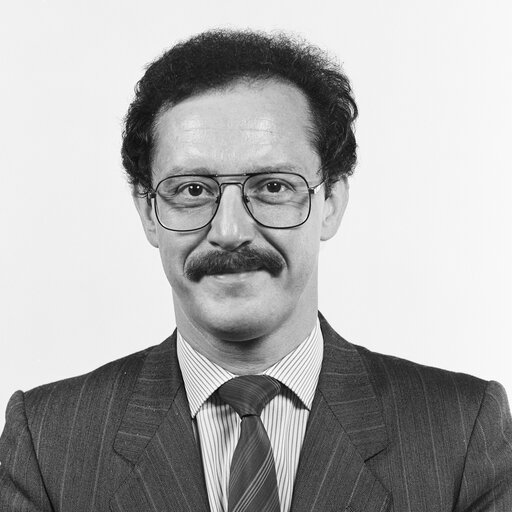

Member of the European Parliament
- In office 9 September 1987 – 18 July 1994
- Constituency: France

Personal details
- Born: 25 November 1946 (age 79) Souchez, France
- Party: French Socialist Party
- Occupation: Politician

Jean-Marie Alexandre is a French politician, who, from 1987 until 1994, was a Member of the European Parliament representing France for the Socialist Party.

== Parliamentary Service ==
- Vice-Chair, Committee on Regional Policy and Regional Planning (1989–1992)
- Vice Chair, Delegation for Relations with the Gulf States (1992–1994)
