= Paulin Bruné =

French politician (born 1946)

Paulin Bruné (born 24 July 1946) is a politician from French Guiana who served in the French National Assembly from 1986-1988, and briefly in the European Parliament in 1986.

Bruné was born in Cayenne, French Guiana, and holds a doctorate in Economics. He joined the Rally for the Republic, and was first elected in 1984. In 1986, he became deputy for French Guiana, and served until 1988.
