= Ben Visser =

Dutch politician

- Born: February 6, 1934 (age 92); The Hague
- Occupation: Politician
- Political party: Labour Party

Ben Visser (born 6 February 1934 in The Hague) is a Dutch politician and local government official, a member of the Labour Party, and a Member of the European Parliament for its 2nd and 3rd terms.

== Biography ==
In 1953, he completed high school, and later he took training courses in finance, economics, and law. He was an editor of the magazine "Tijdschrift voor Openbaar Bestuur". He worked in local administration, including in The Hague and Rotterdam. From 1970 to 1984, he served as the director of the finance department in the municipal administration of Arnhem. From 1983 to 1984, he was a member of the provincial states of Gelderland. He was active in the Labour Party, holding various positions in the regional structures of this group.

In 1984, he was elected as a Member of the European Parliament, and successfully sought re-election in 1989. During his term, he belonged to the Party of European Socialists group. From 1984 to 1987, he was a member of the Committee on Transport, and from 1987 to 1994, he was a member of the Committee on Transport and Tourism. From 1985 to 1987, he was part of the Delegation for relations with Austria. From 1987, he was a member of the Delegation for relations with the countries of the Association of Southeast Asian Nations (ASEAN) and the ASEAN Interparliamentary Organization (AIPO) and with the Republic of Korea. In 1989, he became the vice-chair of this delegation, serving until 1994.
