= Christiane Papon =

French politician (1924–2023)

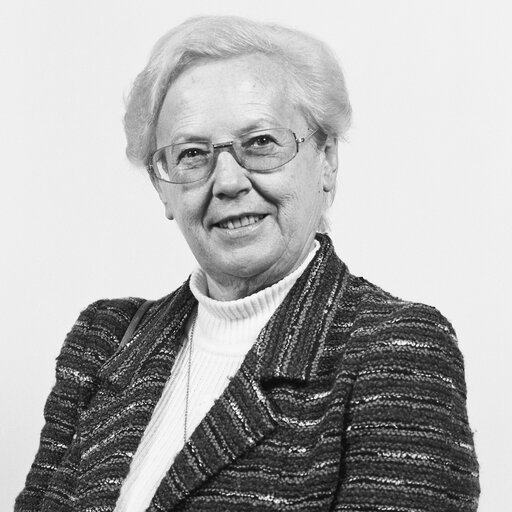

Member of the National Assembly for Val-de-Marne's 1st constituency
- In office 1988–1993

Member of the European Parliament
- In office 1987–1989

Personal details
- Born: 3 September 1924 Vienna, Austria
- Died: 8 January 2023 (aged 98) Neuilly-sur-Seine, France
- Party: RPR

Christiane Papon (French pronunciation: [kʁistjan papɔ̃]; 3 September 1924 – 8 January 2023) was an Austrian-born French politician.

Papon was born on 3 September 1924 in Vienna, Austria. Papon was a member of the Rally for the Republic (RPR), and led its women's wing, Femme Avenir, from 1975 to 1988. She was elected to the National Assembly in 1986 via proportional representation, as a member of the RFR from Val-de-Marne. She represented Val-de-Marne's 1st constituency from 1988, and served until 1993. While a member of the National Assembly, Papon also sat on the European Parliament, representing France from 1987 to 1989.

Papon was designated commander of the Legion of Honor in 2000, and awarded the Grand Cross of the National Order of Merit in 2008.

Papon died in Neuilly-sur-Seine on 8 January 2023, at the age of 98.
