= Jean-Marie Vanlerenberghe =

French politician

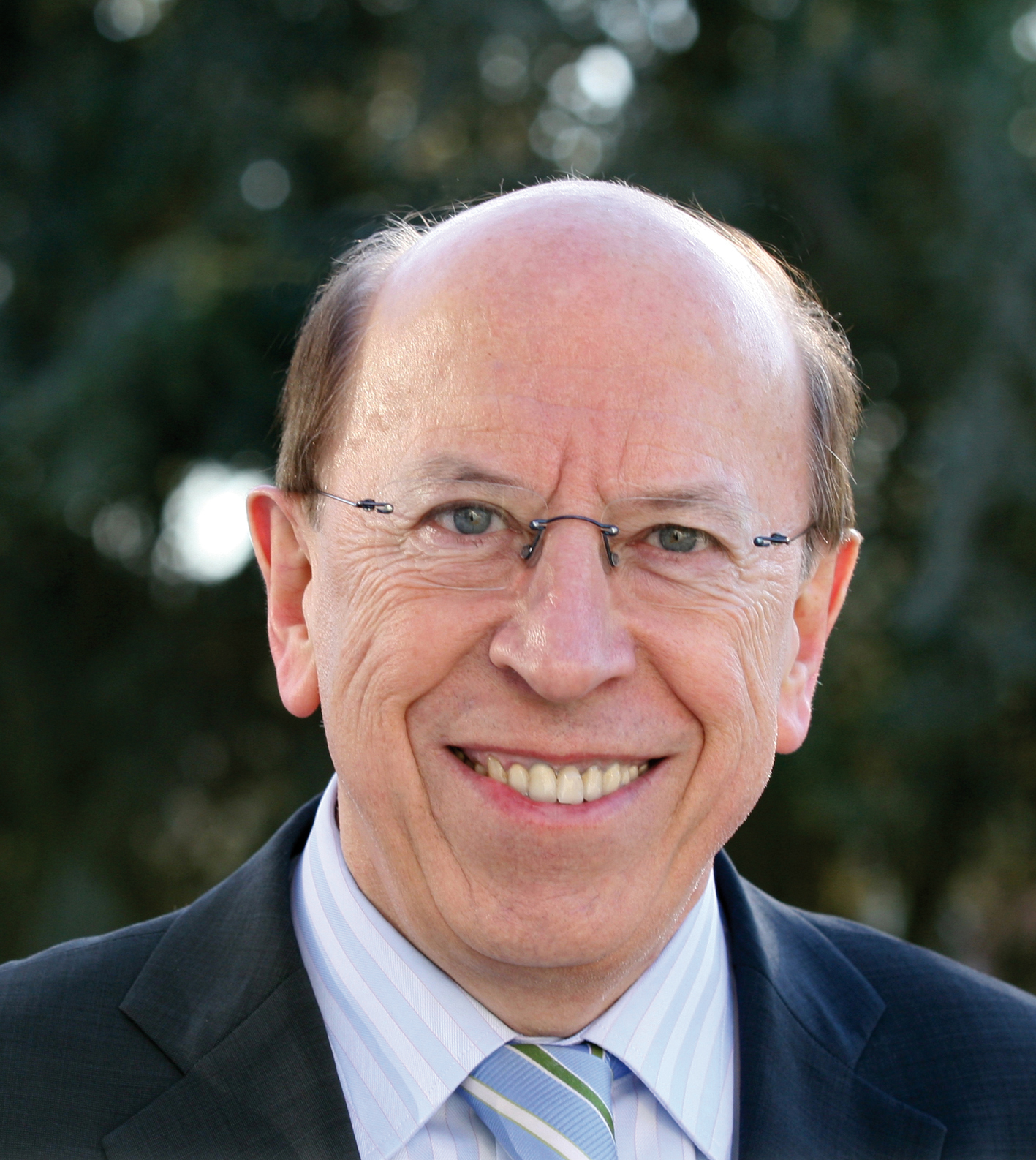
- Jean-Marie Vanlerenberghe in 2009

Member of the French Senate for Pas-de-Calais
- Incumbent
- Assumed office 23 September 2001

Mayor of Arras
- In office 1995–2011
- Preceded by: Léon Fatous
- Succeeded by: Frédéric Leturque

Member of the European Parliament
- In office 31 March 1993 – 18 July 1994
- Preceded by: Simone Veil

Personal details
- Born: 29 March 1939 (age 87) Bully-les-Mines, France
- Party: UDI
- Children: Isabelle Florennes
- Education: ICAM Lille

Jean-Marie Vanlerenberghe (born 29 March 1939) is a French politician of the Democratic Movement (MoDem) who has been serving as a member of the Senate since 2001.

== Early life and career ==
Vanlerenberghe was born in Bully-les-Mines, Pas-de-Calais. He is an engineer by training, having studied at the Institut Catholique d'Arts et Métiers in Lille and holding a degree from the Centre des Hautes Études de la Construction. He worked in Arras for the Public Works Commission, also holding jobs from 1964 to 1974 at Rhône-Poulenc and the Centre d'Études Supérieurs Industrielles.

From 1981 to 1986, Vanlerenberghe led the Fédération Nationale du Crédit Mutuel Agricole et Rural in Paris; from 1990 to 1993, he directed the Conseil en Développement d'Entreprises et Ressources Humaines.

== Political career ==
=== Member of the European Parliament ===
Vanlerenberghe was a Member of the European Parliament from 1986 to 1989 and again from 1993 to 1994. In parliament, he served on the Committee on Youth, Culture, Education, Information and Sport (1986–1987), the Committee on Budgets (1987–1989) and the Committee on the Environment, Public Health and Consumer Protection (1993–1994).

=== Mayor of Arras ===
Vanlerenberghe served as mayor of Arras from June 1995 to February 2011. Having won reelection as mayor in the 2008 elections with broad cross-party support, he left his post in February 2011 in favor of his successor, fellow MoDem politician Frédéric Leturque.

=== Member of the Senate ===
Vanlerenberghe was elected UDF senator from the Pas-de-Calais in the 2001 elections.

A centrist, Vanlerenberghe joined the MoDem of François Bayrou after the 2007 elections and has since been part of the Centrist Union group at the Palais du Luxembourg. In the Senate, he is a member of the Committee on Social Affairs. Since 2014, he has been serving as the Senate's lead rapporteur on the social security in France.

=== Current mandates ===
- Vice-President of Mouvement démocrate
- Senator for Pas-de-Calais
- Member of the Municipal Council of Arras
- Member of the Urban Community of Arras

=== Former mandates ===
- Mayor of Arras
- President of the Urban Community of Arras
- Member of the French Parliamentary Delegation for the European Union
- Member of the Parliamentary Office for the Evaluation of Health Policy
- Regional counsellor for Nord-Pas-de-Calais

== Political positions ==
In 2016, Vanlerenberghe publicly endorsed Alain Juppé in the Republicans' primaries for the 2017 presidential elections.
