= Robert Batailly =

French politician

Robert Batailly (2 March 1934 – 27 November 2017) was a French politician.

Born in Bourg-de-Thizy, Batailly later moved to Lyon, where he was active in municipal politics. As a member of the Radical Party, he sat on the European Parliament in 1989. He later became mayor of the 8th arrondissement of Lyon under the Union for French Democracy banner. Batailly was named a commander of the Legion of Honor in 2010.
