= Pierre Lataillade =

French politician (1933–2020)

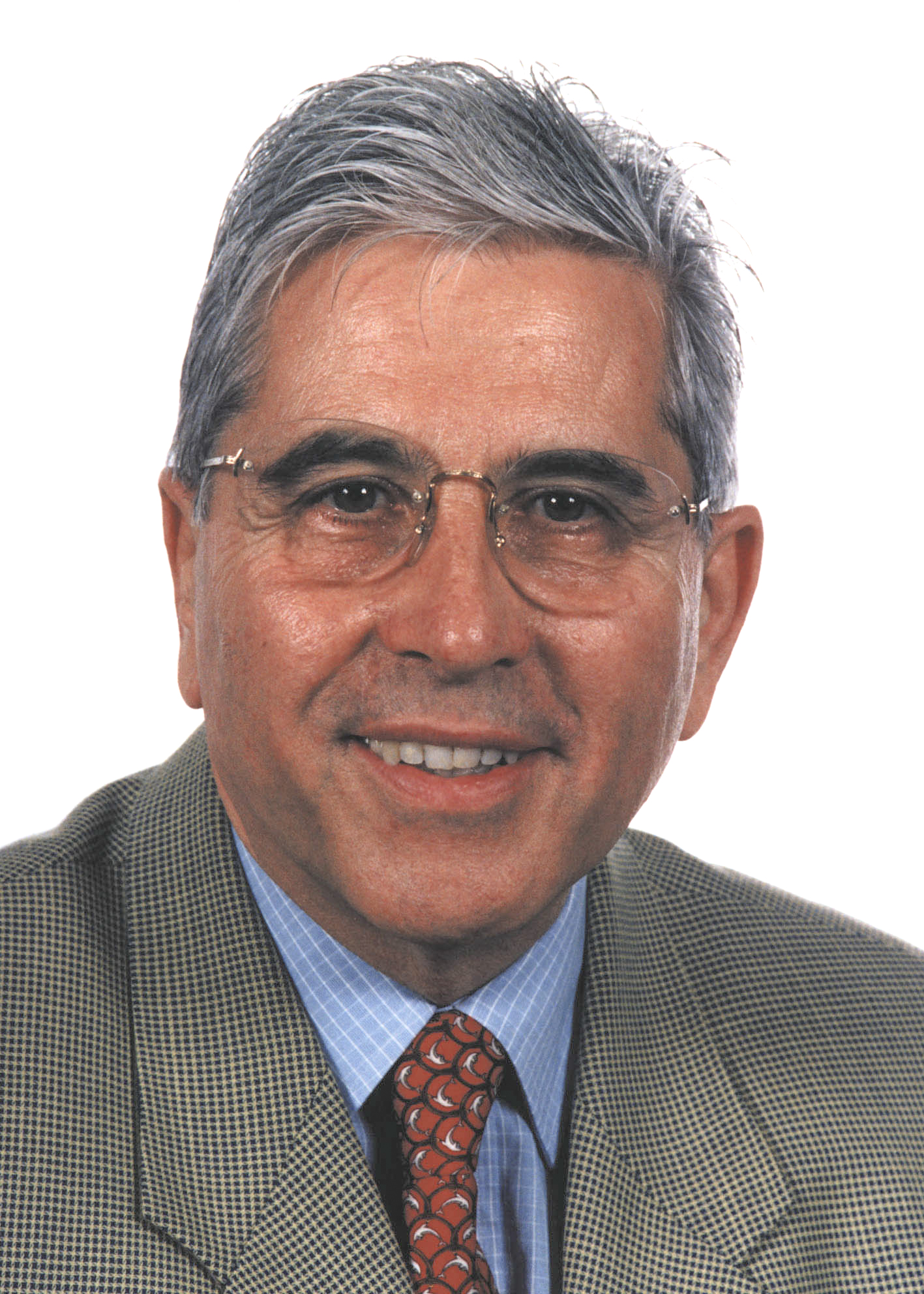

Member of the European Parliament
- In office 20 March 1986 – 19 July 1999

Member of the French National Assembly for Gironde's 7th constituency
- In office 19 March 1978 – 22 May 1981
- Preceded by: Émile Durand
- Succeeded by: Kléber Haye

Mayor of Arcachon
- In office 1985 – 18 March 2001
- Preceded by: Robert Fleury
- Succeeded by: Yves Foulon

Personal details
- Born: 27 April 1933 Arcachon, France
- Died: 7 November 2020 (aged 87) Gujan-Mestras, France
- Party: RPR

Pierre Lataillade (27 April 1933 – 7 November 2020) was a French politician.

== Biography ==
Lataillade began his political career on the Municipal Council of Arcachon in 1956. He was very quickly spotted by Mayor Lucien de Gracia, who made him his deputy. He then continued his duties as a deputy for Robert Fleury. Fleury resigned as Mayor in 1985, leaving the position to Lataillade. Lataillade won the mayoral elections of 1985, 1989, and 1995. However, he was defeated by Yves Foulon in 2001. He subsequently retired from political life.

In addition to his mayoral duties, Lataillade served as a Member of the European Parliament, a Deputy for Gironde's 7th constituency, and a General Councillor for the Canton of Arcachon.

Pierre Lataillade died in Gujan-Mestras on 7 November 2020 at the age of 87.
