= Jean Mouchel =

French politician (1928–2022)

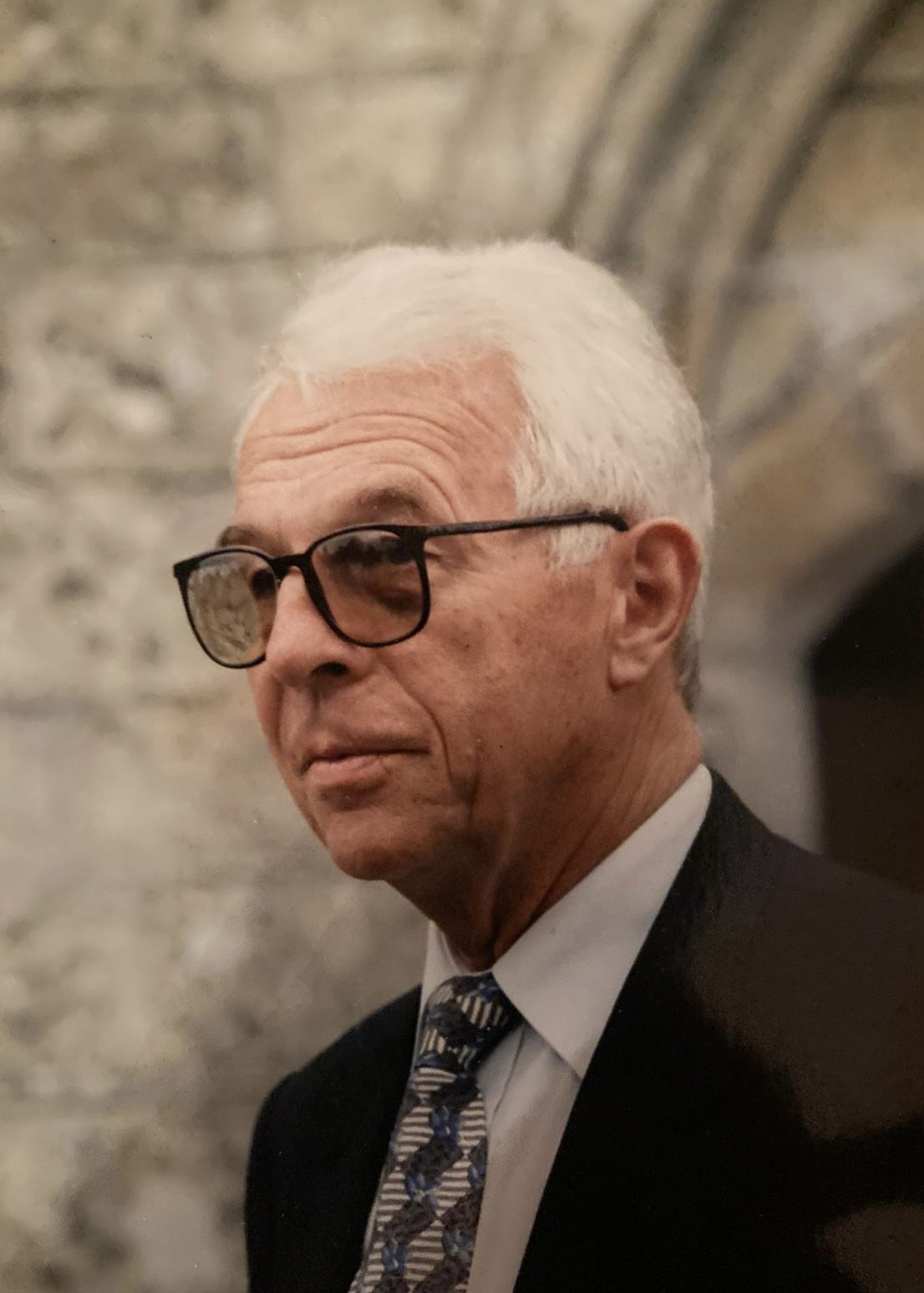

Member of the European Parliament
- In office 24 July 1984 – 24 July 1989
- Constituency: France
- In office 16 February 1982 – 30 September 1983
- Constituency: France

Personal details
- Born: 22 May 1928 Bricquebosq, France
- Died: 7 March 2022 (aged 93) France
- Party: RPR

Jean Mouchel (22 May 1928 – 7 March 2022) was a French politician, novelist, and farmer.

== Life and career ==
Mouchel spent his childhood in Lieusaint, Manche, and subsequently became a farmer in Folligny and Noyers-Bocage. He became active in trade unions, serving as President of the Fédération régionale des syndicats d'exploitants agricoles and vice-president of the Fédération nationale des syndicats d'exploitants agricoles.

Mouchel's activism in trade unions led him to politics. In 1982, he was elected to represent France in the European Parliament as a member of the Rally for the Republic. He was re-elected in 1984. He also served in the Regional Council of Basse-Normandie, of which he became vice-president in 1986. In addition to his political activities, he was affiliated with the Société des auteurs de Normandie.

Jean Mouchel died on 7 March 2022, at the age of 93.

== Works ==
- Le Champ de la bien-aimée (1988)
- Les Cahiers de guerre de Jeanne Métadier (2002)
- La Robe bleue d'Hélène (2002)
- Le Fils d'Hélène (2005)
- Soir maudit à la ferme d'Arry (2009)
- Normands depuis toujours (2012)
- La Bonne Fortune de Sébastien (2013)
- Paysan engagé (2016)
