= Pierre Pranchère =

French politician (1927–2023)

Deputy of National Assembly
- In office 1956–1958

Deputy of European Parliament
- In office 1979–1989

Personal details
- Born: 1 July 1927; Brive-la-Gaillarde, France
- Died: 30 December 2023 (aged 96)
- Political party: French Communist Party
- Occupation: Politician; Farmer

Pierre Pranchère (1 July 1927 – 30 December 2023) was a French politician and farmer.

Pranchère was a member of the French Communist Party (PCF), and served as deputy of National Assembly in 1956 and 1958. He sat on the PCF Central Committee from 1964 to 1985. Pranchère was re-elected deputy of the first constituency of Corrèze in 1973. He was also a member of the general council of Corrèze, elected in the Canton of La Roche-Canillac. Pranchère was already a member of the young underground communists from 1943. He was also elected deputy of the I and II legislatures.

== Biography ==
Pierre Pranchère was born in Brive-la-Gaillarde, France on 1 July 1927. He worked with his farming parents. Pranchère was the general secretary of the Maquis de Corrèze collective.

Pranchère died on 30 December 2023, at the age of 96.

Political offices
Preceded by Jean Vinatier	Deputy of National Assembly; 1956–1958	Succeeded by Jean-Pierre Bechter
Preceded by —	Deputy of European Parliament; 1979–1989	Succeeded by —
