= Nicole Chouraqui =

French economist and politician (1938 – 1987)

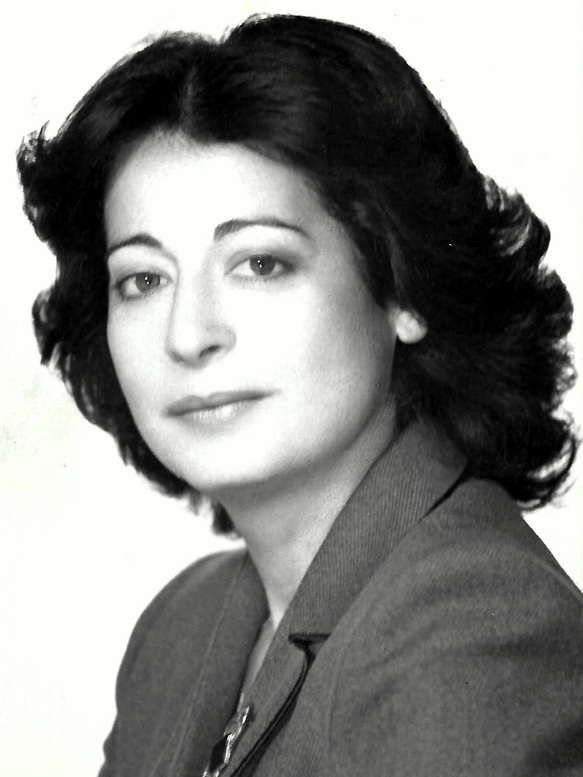

Deputy Mayor of Paris
- In office 1984–1987

Member of European Parliament
- In office 1979–1980

Personal details
- Born: 18 March 1938 Algiers, French Algeria
- Died: 31 August 1987 (aged 49) Paris, France
- Citizenship: French
- Party: Rally for the Republic (RPR); Radical Party (before 1978)
- Education: Sciences Po

Nicole Chouraqui (French pronunciation: [nikɔl ʃuʁaki]; 18 March 1938 – 31 August 1987) was a French economist and politician. She served as deputy secretary general of the RPR party. She was a member of the European Parliament.

== Biography ==
Born on 18 March 1938 in Algiers, Algeria, Nicole Chouraqui was the daughter of business manager Félix Dahan and his wife Marcelle Cohen-Bacri, director of a kindergarten. She studied at the Delacroix high school in Algiers. On a scholarship, she continued her higher education at the Public Service section of the Paris Institute of Political Studies (Sciences Po), from which she graduated in 1959.

In 1960, she became a financial analyst at the Banque de l'Union Parisienne, a French investment bank. She later became the director of the French Broadcasting and Television Office (ORTF) in 1970 and started an economic magazine. In 1971, she founded the school of economics for women, also called the “Center Eurofemme”, which trained 2500 students over 10 years.

She began her political career with the Radical Party of France. She later, at the request of Jacques Chirac, joined the RPR. From 1978, she was in charge of the party's associative pole, and then she became the deputy secretary general of the party. She was the councilor of Paris, representing the 19th arrondissement, where a street was named after her. From 17 July 1979 to 16 October 1980, she served as a member of the European Parliament. On 24 July 1984, she was elected as a deputy mayor of Paris, a position she held until her death.

She was married to insurer Claude Chouraqui.

She died on 31 August 1987 in Paris as a result of cancer.
