= Charles-Émile Loo =

French politician (1922–2016)

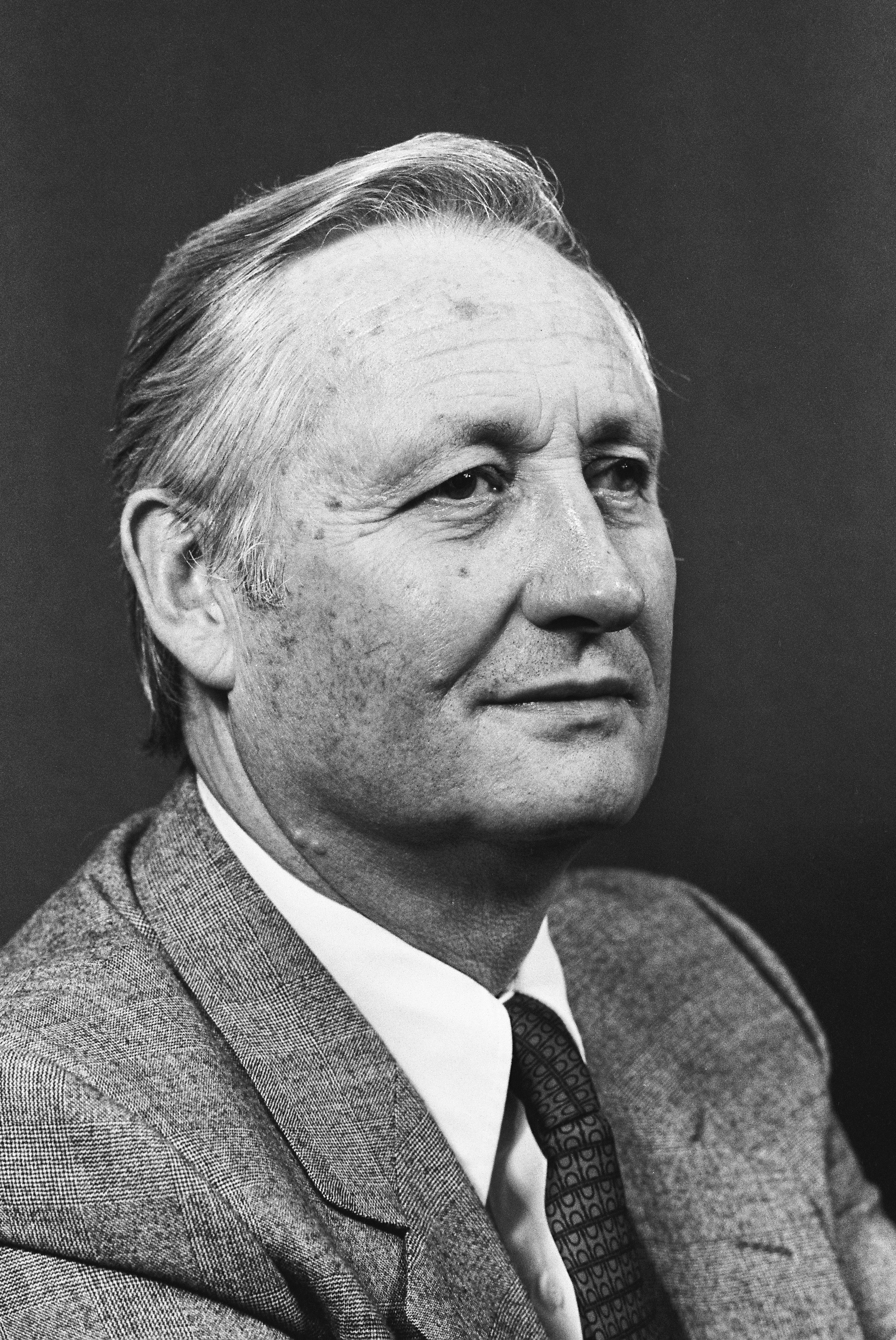
- Born: 4 March 1922; Marseille, Bouches-du-Rhône, France
- Died: 20 August 2016 (aged 94)
- Occupation: Politician
- Political party: Socialist Party

Charles-Émile Loo (4 March 1922 – 20 August 2016) was a French politician. He served as a member of the National Assembly from 1967 to 1968, and from 1973 to 1978. He also served as a member of the European Parliament from 1979 to 1989.
