= Marie-Claude Vayssade =

French politician (1936–2020)

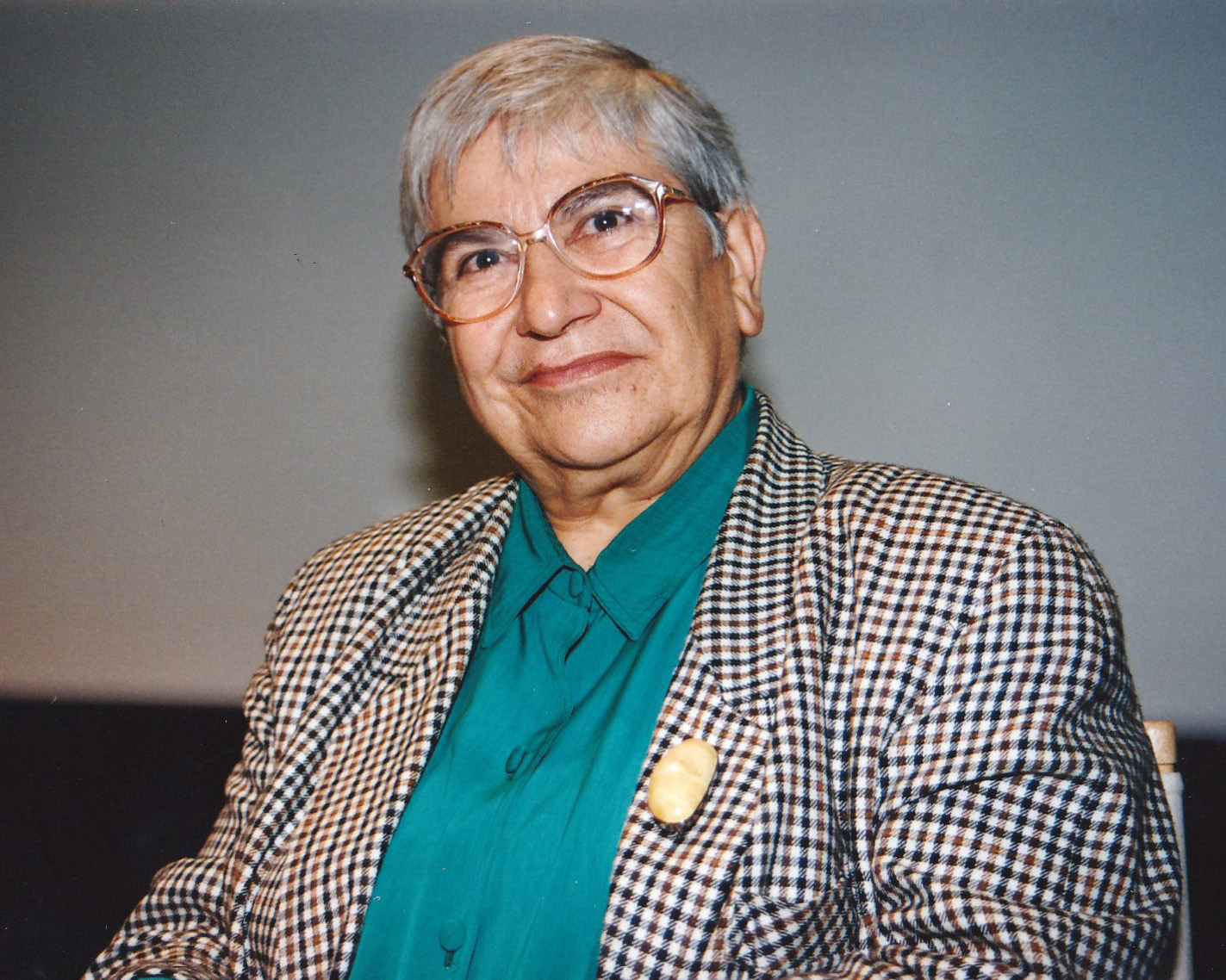

Member of the European Parliament
- In office 17 July 1979 – 18 July 1994

Personal details
- Born: 8 August 1936 Pierrepont, France
- Died: 11 November 2020 (aged 84) Vandœuvre-lès-Nancy, France
- Party: PS

Marie-Claude Vayssade (8 August 1936 – 11 November 2020) was a French politician. She served on the European Parliament from 1979 to 1994 and was a member of the Socialist Party.

== Decorations ==
- Commander of the Ordre national du Mérite (2012)
