= Dominique Chaboche =

French politician

Dominique Chaboche (12 May 1937, Paris – 16 November 2005) was a French far-right wing politician and member of the European Parliament affiliated to the Front National.

He succeeded to Alain Robert as general secretary of the National Front (Front national) in October 1973. In 1976 he became vice-president of the FN, and was elected European deputy in 1984, and deputy at the National Assembly between 1986 and 1988.

From 1986 to 2005, he was president of the National Front group at the regional council of Haute-Normandie.

Chaboche was a specialist of international contact with foreign far-right movements, especially in Russia and the Balkans.

He can be seen in the documentary White Terror encouraging Russian Nazi-Skinheads.

== Quotations ==
- If we have to, we will be the first ones to press the trigger ! (in 1998, in the context of the trial of Jean-Marie Le Pen before the appeal Court of Versailles).
