= Bouke Beumer =

Dutch economist and politician

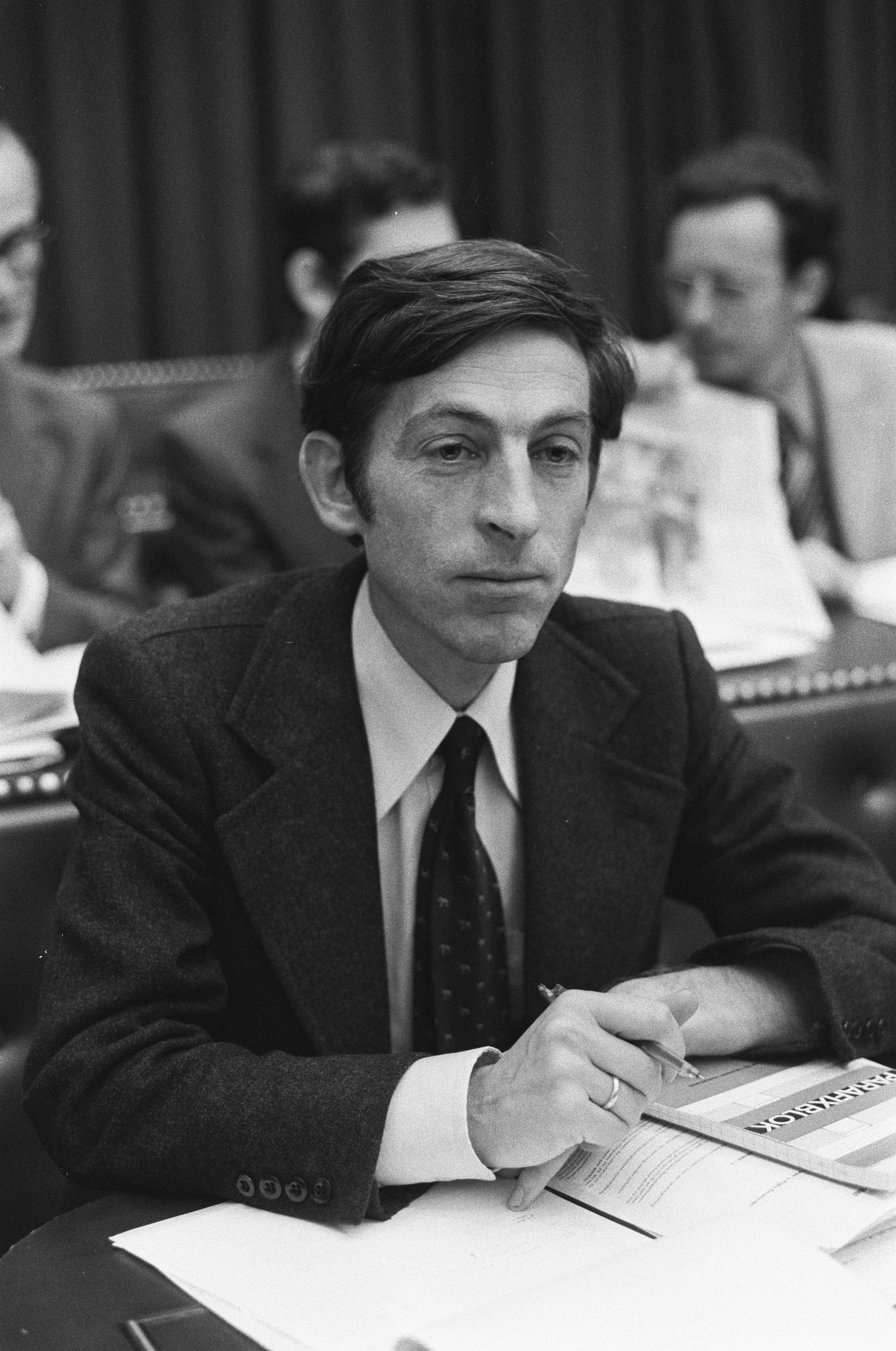

Personal details
- Born: 21 November 1934 Valkenswaard, Netherlands
- Died: 10 April 2022 (aged 87) Bloemendaal, Netherlands
- Party: Christian Democratic Appeal
- Occupation: Economist, politician

Bouke Beumer (21 November 1934 in Valkenswaard, Netherlands – 10 April 2022 in Bloemendaal, Netherlands) was a Dutch economist, politician and local government official, member of the Christian Democratic Appeal, MP for Tweede Kamer, member of the European Parliament for the first, second and third terms.

== Biography ==
He was educated at the Nederlandse Economische Hogeschool in Rotterdam. He worked at the Unilever corporation and in regional administration. He was active in the Anti-Revolutionary Party and was part of its central government. With the group, in 1980, he co-founded the Christian Democratic Appeal.

From 1966 to 1975 he held the position of mayor of the municipality of Midwolda. At the same time, from 1968 to 1971, he temporarily performed the duties of mayor of the municipality of Scheemda. From 1970, he was also a provincial councilor of Groningen for five years. From January 1975 to July 1979 he sat on the Twedee Kamer, the lower house of the Dutch States General. During this time, he served as vice chairman of the special committee on the Groningen peat colony redevelopment project and vice chairman of the economic affairs committee.

In 1979, he obtained a mandate for the first time to the European Parliament. He renewed it in the two subsequent elections in 1984 and 1989, serving in the European Parliament until 1994. Over his fifteen-year tenure in the EP, Bouke Beumer was a member of the bureau of the European People's Party (1979–1994), a member of the Committee on Economic and Monetary Affairs (1979–1982 and 1984–1987), chair of the Committee on Youth, Culture, Education, Information, and Sport (1982–1984), as well as chair of the Committee on Economic and Monetary Affairs and Industrial Policy (1987–1994).

He was active in various social organizations, and from 2000 to 2003 was chairman of the Federatie Filmbelangen.
