= Jim Janssen van Raaij =

Dutch lawyer and politician (1931–2010)

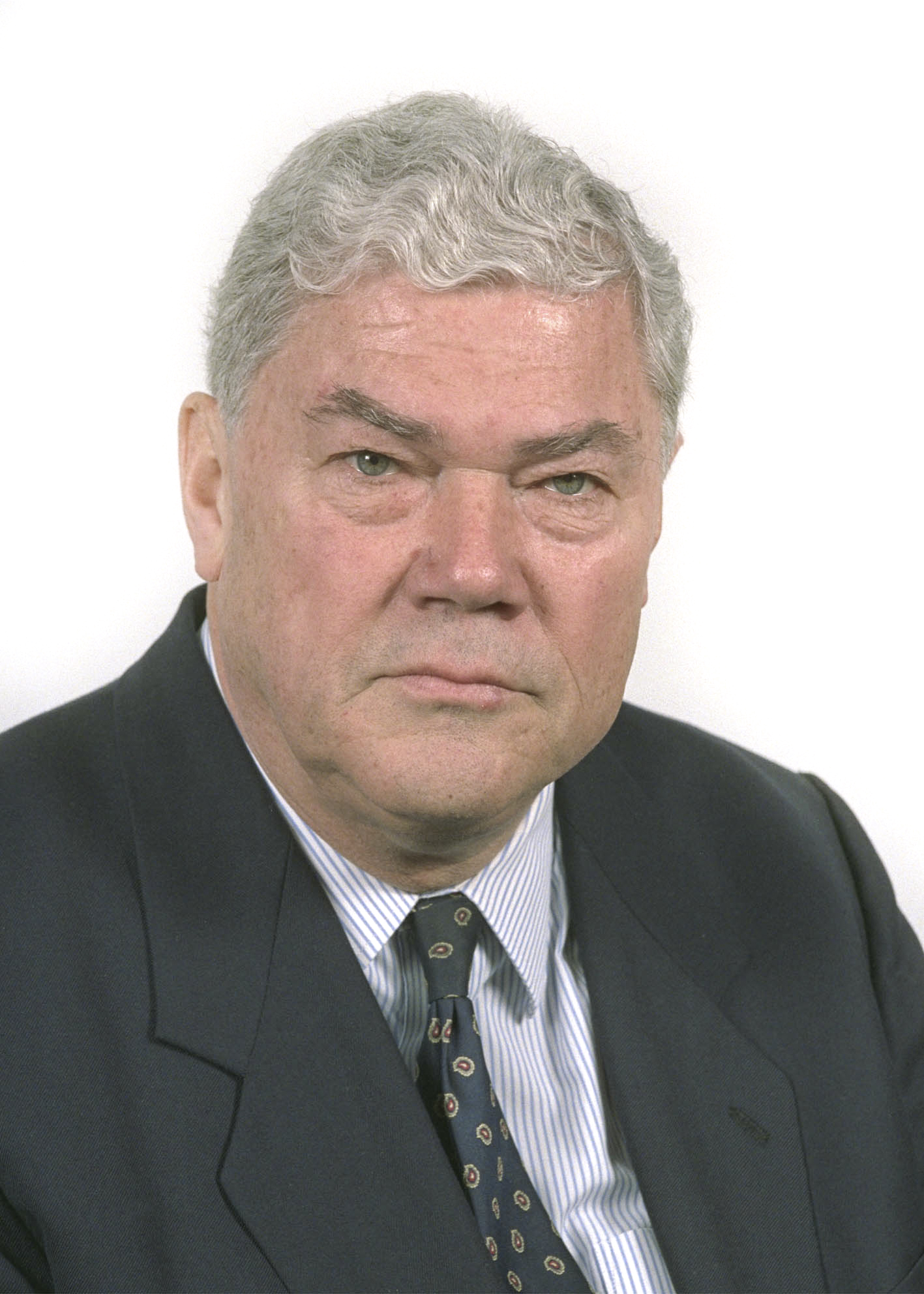

House of Representatives Member of the European Parliament
- In office 2002–2003

Personal details
- Born: James Leonard Janssen van Raay; 1 June 1932 Muntok, Dutch East Indies
- Died: 11 February 2010 (aged 77) The Hague
- Party: Pim Fortuyn List (2002–2003)
- Other political affiliations: EVPN (1999) Union 55+ (1996–1999) Christian Democratic Appeal (1980–1996) Christian Historical Union (1980)
- Occupation: Politician, lawyer

James "Jim" Leonard Janssen van Raay (1 June 1931 – 11 February 2010) was a Dutch lawyer and politician.

== Biography ==
Janssen van Raay was born in 1931 in Mentok, then part of the Dutch East Indies. As a teenager he was placed in a civilian internment camp run by the Japanese during the Second World War. He arrived in the Netherlands in 1946 and started a career as a lawyer. In 1961 he was involved in the foundation of the Association of Contract Players, a union for professional football players in the Netherlands. Van Raaij died in early 2010 at the age of 77 in a hospital in The Hague.

== Politics ==
Janssen van Raay became involved in the Christian Historical Union and was appointed as its national secretary. In 1980, he was a founding member of the Christian Democratic Appeal (CDA). In 1979, he was elected as an MEP to the European Parliament for the CDA but became an independent in 1996 due to alleged financial misdeeds. He joined the Union for Europe group as an independent MEP and supported a number of eurosceptic proposals including voting against the introduction of the Euro currency. At the same time he also joined the Union 55+ party but continued to serve as an independent in the European parliament until his term ended. In 1999 he took part in the European Parliament elections with his own party, the European Electors Platform Netherlands (EVPN) but narrowly failed to win a seat.

In 2002, he joined the newly created Pim Fortuyn List and was third on the candidate list for the 2002 general election. He was elected to the House of Representatives on 15 May 2002. Van Raaij had more professional political experience than other LPF members and was vice-chairman of the standing committee for Foreign Affairs. Following Fortuyn's assassination, he attended the trial of Volkert van der Graaf to give a witness statement. He ran for president of the House of Representatives, but lost to Frans Weisglas. He would retire from politics at the 2003 election due to disputes with new LPF leader Mat Herben.
