= Jean Penders =

Dutch politician (1939–2025)

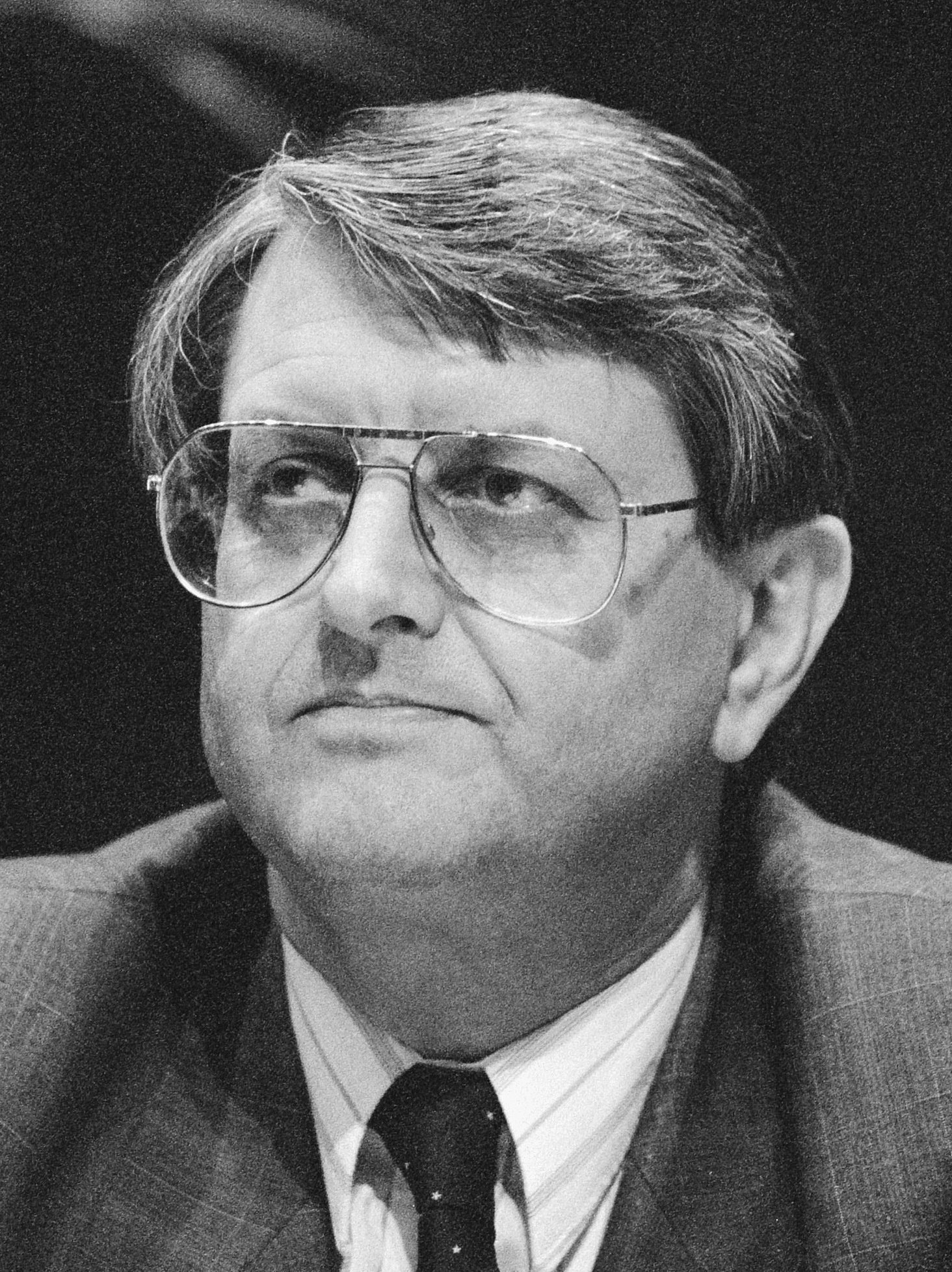
- Penders in 1989

Member of the European Parliament for the Netherlands
- In office 17 July 1979 – 18 July 1994

Personal details
- Born: Johannes Josephus Maria Penders; 5 April 1939; Gemert, Netherlands
- Died: 13 January 2025 (aged 85); Leidschendam, Netherlands
- Political party: KVP (until 1980); Christian Democratic Appeal (1980–2025)
- Education: Catholic University of Nijmegen

Johannes Josephus Maria "Jean" Penders (5 April 1939 – 13 January 2025) was a Dutch politician. A member of the Catholic People's Party and the Christian Democratic Appeal, he served in the European Parliament from 1979 to 1994.

Penders died in Leidschendam on 13 January 2025, at the age of 85.
