= Phili Viehoff =

Dutch politician

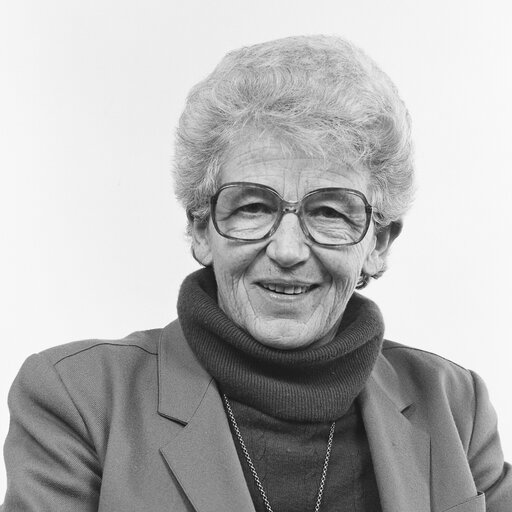

Member of the European Parliament
- In office 29 November 1979 – 24 July 1989

Member of the municipal council of Hoevelaken
- In office September 1974 – 1977

Member of the States of Gelderland
- In office 5 June 1974 – 1977

Personal details
- Born: 8 June 1924 Zwolle, Netherlands
- Died: 1 June 2015 (aged 90) Haren, Groningen, Netherlands
- Party: Labour Party

Philippine Johanna "Phili" Viehoff born Maag-van Os van den Abeele (8 June 1924 – 1 June 2015) was a Dutch politician of the Labour Party. Between 1974 and 1977 she served on the municipal council of Hoevelaken and in the States of Gelderland. Between November 1979 and July 1989 she was a Member of the European Parliament (MEP).

== Career ==
Viehoff was born on 8 June 1924 in Zwolle. Between 1945 and 1949 she worked as a child carer. In 1953 she was employed by the newspaper Het Parool for a while. In 1974 Viehoff took up political office. On 5 June she became member of the States of Gelderland and in September of the same year she became member of the municipal council Hoevelaken. Both her positions ended in 1977.

On 29 November 1979 Viehoff became member of the European Parliament when she succeeded Anne Vondeling. For her first four years in the Parliament she was member of the Committee on Youth, Culture, Education, Information and Sport. Between 1984 and 1989 she was member of the Committee on Energy, Research and Technology. And for the largest part of her time in Parliament she was also part of the Delegation for relations with Japan. During her time as MEP Viehoff was supportive of biotechnology as a socially steerable technology. In February 1987 she presented the report Biotechnology in Europe and the need for an integrated policy, the report was adopted by the European Parliament. In February 1989 Viehoff asked the European Commission whether it was going to discipline former Dutch Prime Minister Dries van Agt for comments he made regarding the Dutch delegation to the funeral of Japanese Emperor Dries van Agt. She found his comments towards the Dutch government denigratory. Viehoff's term in the European Parliament ended on 24 July 1989.

In the 1990s Viehoff was active in the Rooie Vrouwen in de PvdA (Red Women of the Labour Party) movement. Viehoff died on 1 June 2015 in Haren, Groningen.
