= Ien van den Heuvel =

Dutch politician (1927–2010)

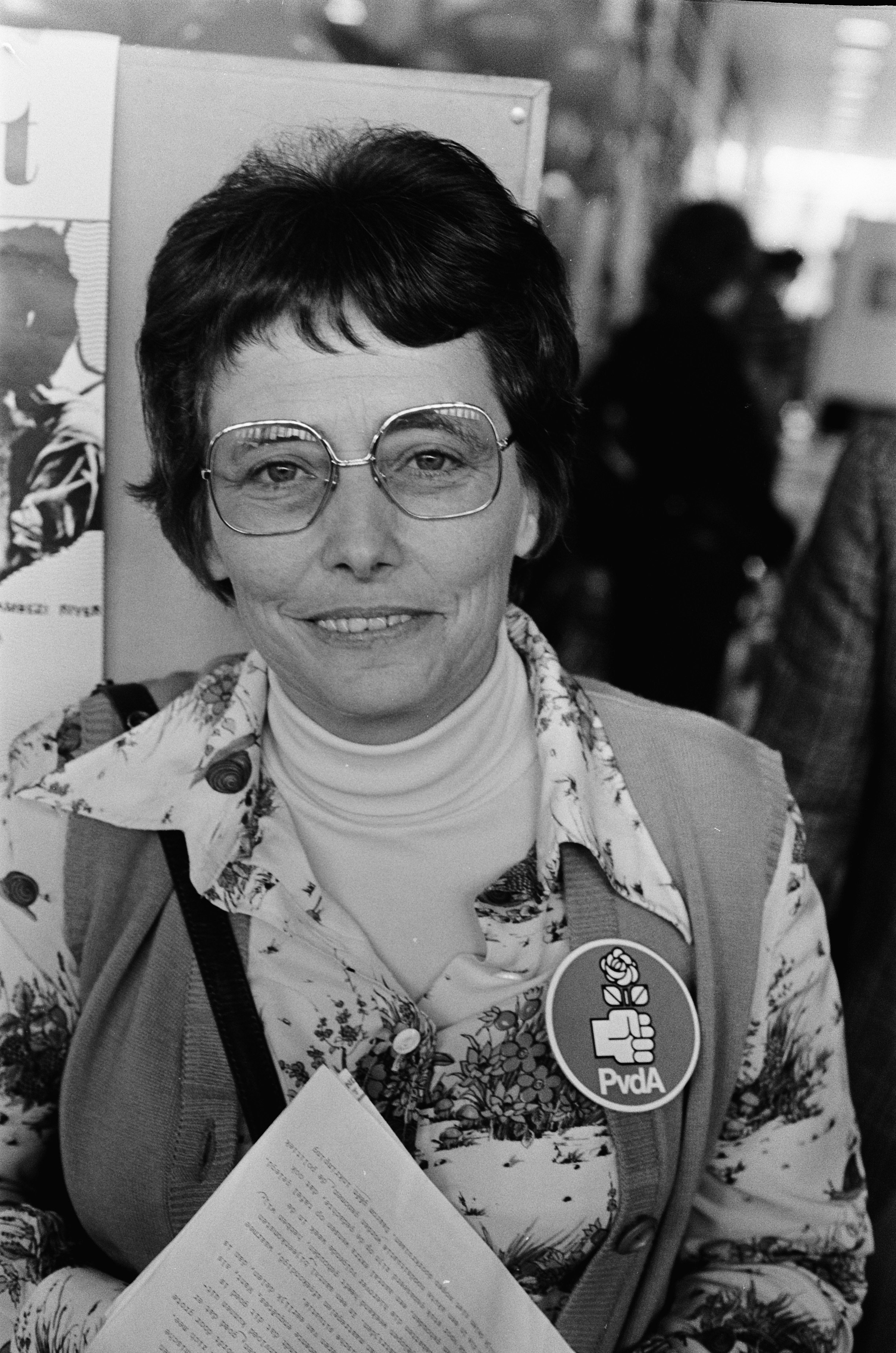
Van den Heuvel in 1975

Carolina van den Heuvel-de Blank, known as Ien van den Heuvel, (7 August 1927 – 13 October 2010) was a Dutch Labour Party (PvdA) politician.

== Political life ==
Van den Heuvel joined the Dutch Labour Party (Partij van de Arbeid) immediately when it was formed in 1946, was president of its women's association from 1969 to 1974, and was the party's first female chair from 1975 to 1979.

She was a member of the Senate of the Netherlands from 1974 to 1979 and of the European Parliament from 1979 to 1984 and from 1984 to 1989.

== Personal life ==
Carolina de Blank was born 7 August 1927 in Tiel. She married Ad van den Heuvel (born 1925) in 1950 and they had one daughter and one son. She died 13 October 2010 in Heemskerk.
