= Teun Tolman =

Dutch politician (1924 - 2007)

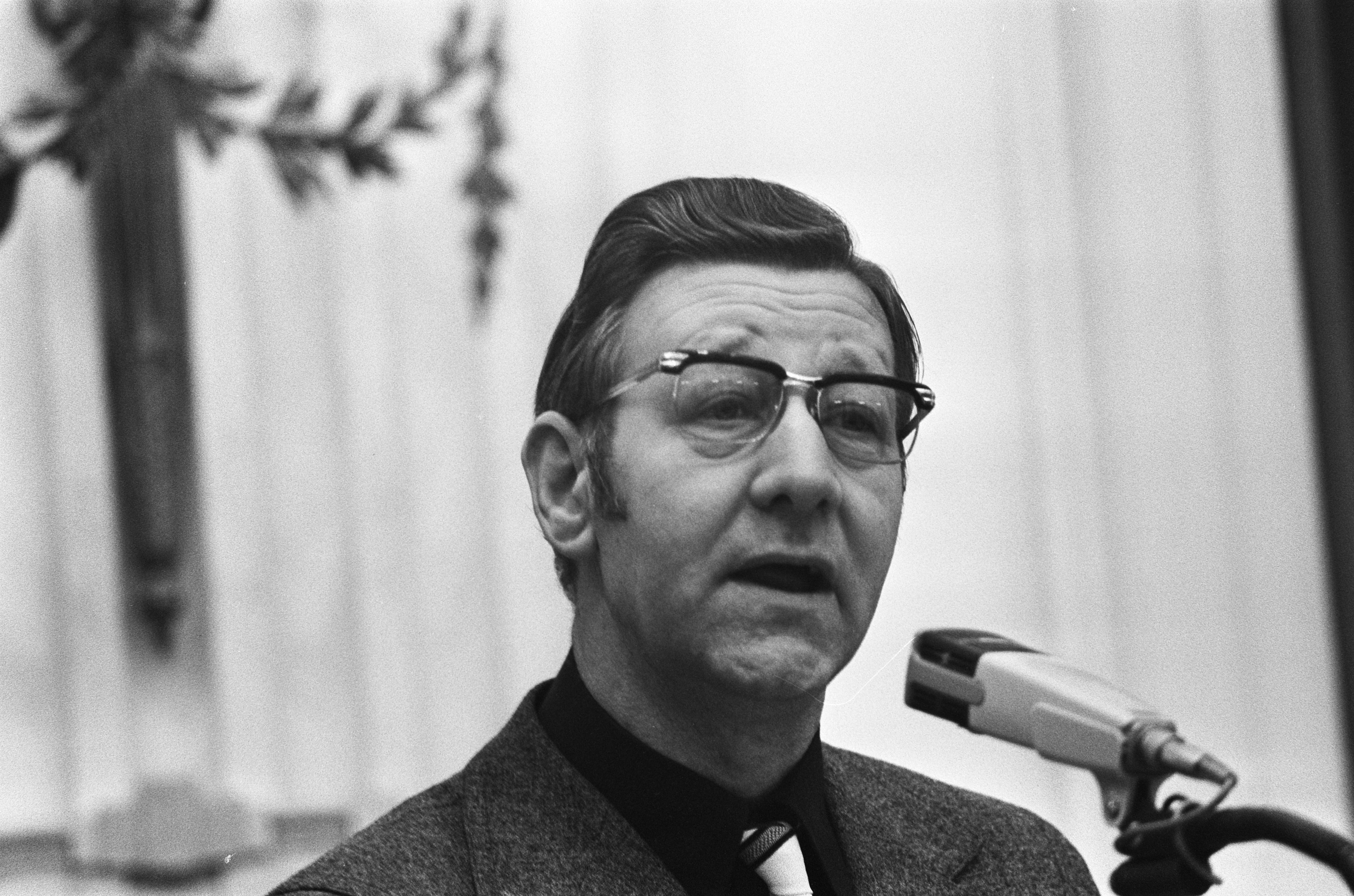
Teunus Tolman in 1974

Teunus (Teun) Tolman (22 September 1924, in Oldeholtpade – 30 October 2007, in Oldeholtpade) was a Dutch politician and farmer. He was a member of the House of Representatives from 1963 to 1979, representing the Christian Historical Union (CHU). From 1979 to 1986, he was a member of the European Parliament, until 1980 for the CHU and from 1980 onward for the CDA. Tolman died in Oldeholtpade in 2007.
