= Elise Boot =

Dutch jurist and former politician (1932–2023)

Elisabeth Cornelia Alphonsa Maria (Elise) Boot (2 August 1932 – 27 November 2023) was a Dutch jurist and politician.

Boot was born in Rotterdam on 2 August 1932. She studied theology at the Catholic University of Nijmegen, but after a few years she switched to studying law at the National University of Utrecht. She graduated in 1967.

Following her studies, she worked at the Europa Institute of Utrecht University, focussing on economic law. From 1970 she was also linked to the Salzburg Seminar in American Studies in the Austrian city of Salzburg. In 1971 she became a member of the executive board of the Faculty of Law of the University of Utrecht. She also taught European law at the University of Birmingham from 1973 to 1974.

For the Christian Democratic Appeal (CDA) she was a member of two legislative bodies. From 1978 to 1982 she was a member of the Provinciale Staten of Utrecht and from 1979 to 1989 she was a member of the European Parliament.

In 1989 the CDA decided not to make her a candidate for the European Parliament again. In a hopeless attempt to stay in the Parliament, she joined the splinterparty 'God Met Ons' (God With Us). For this party she was number five on the ballot. Around 1994 she joined the Algemeen Ouderen Verbond (General Elderly Alliance). Later she ended up in the Lijst Pim Fortuyn (List Pim Fortuyn). For this party she was number 23 on the ballot in the 2003 parliamentary elections, but she did not receive enough votes to take a seat. Until June 2003 she was a member of the governing body of the List Pim Fortuyn, but in July she was expelled from the party. In 2004 she joined Pim Fortuyn's Cultuurgoed (Pim Fortuyn's Cultural Heritage).

Boot had also been active in other functions. She had a seat in the boards of three European-oriented clubs: the Europese Beweging in Nederland (European Movement in the Netherlands), the Mouvement Européen (European Movement) and the Union of European Federalists. She was also member of the department of 'international affairs' of the Raad van Kerken (Council of Churches in the Netherlands) and a member of the Katholieke Raad voor Kerk en Samenleving (Catholic Council for Church and Society).

Boot died in Utrecht on 27 November 2023, at the age of 91.
