= European reactions to the 2006 Lebanon War =

Reactions to the 2006 Lebanon War coming from the European countries.

== Austria ==
Ursula Plassnik, Austrian foreign minister, called for an immediate end to hostilities in Lebanon. "The [use of] blind force must stop," Plassnik said. "I appeal seriously to the Israeli army and Hezbollah to stop their attacks and no longer oppose diplomatic efforts" to end the conflict, she said.

== Belgium ==
Minister of foreign affairs Karel De Gucht and Prime Minister Guy Verhofstadt said that Israel has the right to defend itself, but has now responded with excessive violence. Verhofstadt also called for the release of the captured Israeli soldiers. The Belgian-Lebanese leader of the Arab European League, Dyab Abou Jahjah, expressed his will to go to Lebanon to fight against Israel.

== Bosnia and Herzegovina ==
Former High Representative Paddy Ashdown said that "It is not Hezbullah's position that is weakening now. It is Israel's. Its stated war aim was to destroy Hezbullah. It is not clear why, having failed to do this by occupying Lebanon, it thought it could achieve it by bombing," he warned.

== Bulgaria ==
Bulgaria voiced its concern over the growing tension in the Near East region, Ministry of Foreign Affairs Spokesman Dimitar Tsanchev said in a press-release: "We condemn the kidnap of the two Israeli soldiers. We consider that the Shiite Lebanese organization Hisbullah should release them immediately and cease the shooting against Israeli territory". "We bitterly condemn the bombing of the Israeli Army on Lebanon, which result in the death of tens of innocent Lebanese citizens. Israel should refrain from such actions and from breaking the borders of Lebanon," the release further said.

== Denmark ==
The Danish foreign minister Per Stig Møller said that the Lebanese government has to take responsibility to prevent further terror attacks from Hezbollah in southern Lebanon. Israel has the right to act in self-defense, but is also obligated to not use too strong measures.

Following the Israeli attack on Qana, the Foreign Minister said he was “horrified” by the Israeli bombing of the town of Qana earlier on Sunday and "the senseless loss of life that we have seen here. It is completely unacceptable. Our thoughts and feelings are with the affected families of all civilian victims of the conflict.”

== Finland ==
Finland, which currently holds the European Union's rotating presidency, has issued the following statement: "The European Union is greatly concerned about the disproportionate use of force by Israel in Lebanon in response to attacks by Hezbollah on Israel. The presidency deplores the loss of civilian lives and the destruction of civilian infrastructure. The imposition of an air and sea blockade on Lebanon cannot be justified."

Finnish foreign minister Erkki Tuomioja, representing the EU in Israel, criticised Israeli "precision attacks" for hitting "everyone except Hezbollah" after the killing of four UN peacekeepers (including one Finnish) in southern Lebanon. "Israel could be destroying Lebanon while leaving the guerrilla group Hizbullah intact", stated Tuomioja on 11 August

== France ==
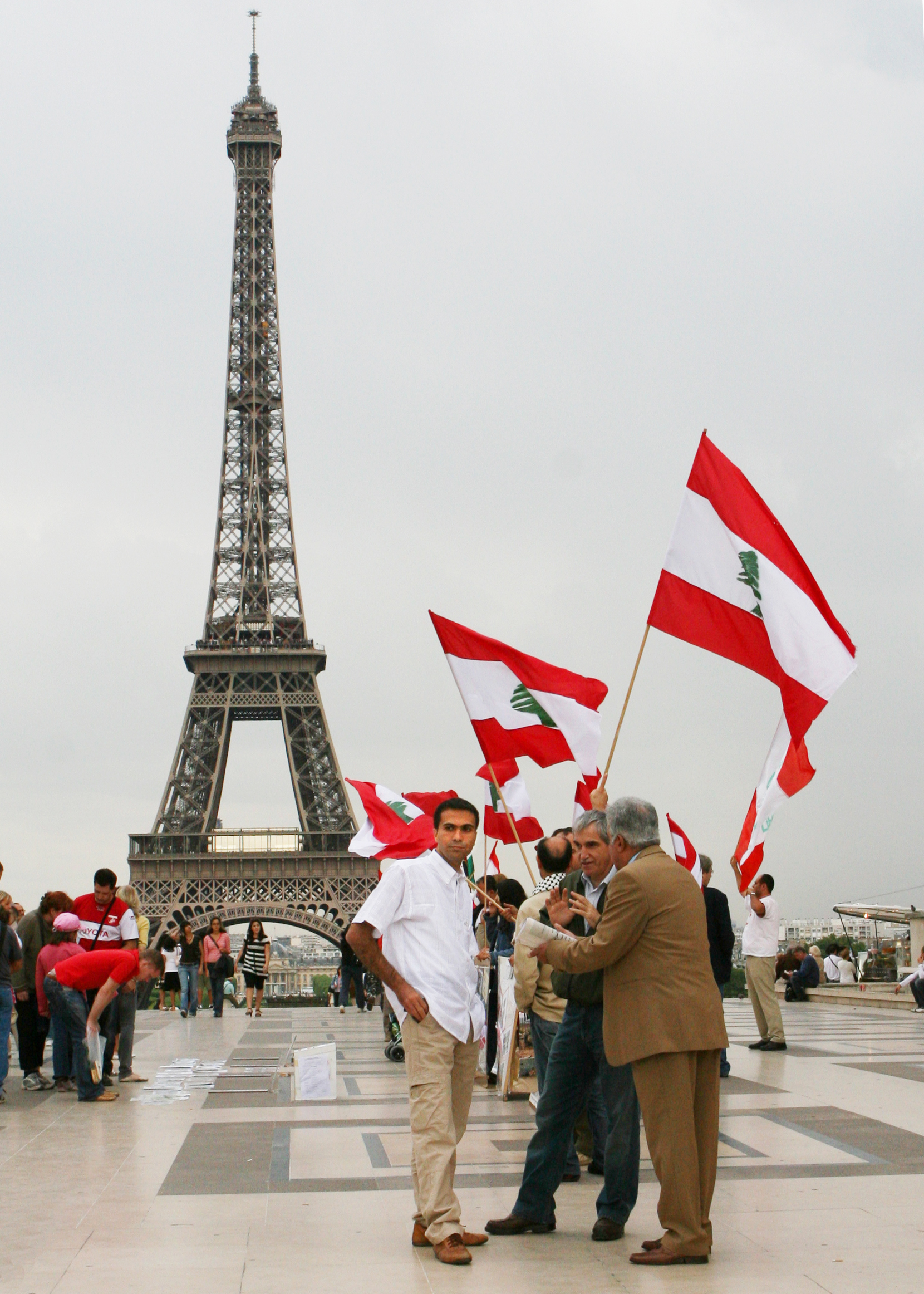
Pro-Lebanese demonstrators at the Eiffel Tower.

Foreign minister Philippe Douste-Blazy said the Israeli offensive on Lebanon is a "disproportionate act of war with negative consequences" which could "plunge Lebanon back into the worst years of the war with the flight of thousands of Lebanese who ... were in the process of rebuilding their country." Douste-Blazy also condemned Hezbollah rocket attacks and the kidnappings of Israeli soldiers, and asked for their immediate and unconditional release, and called I call on all parties to "show restraint and not engage in a cycle of violence in which civilian populations would be the first victims".

French President Jacques Chirac castigated the Israeli offensive into Lebanon on 14 July. However, Israeli Army Radio later reported that Chirac had secretly told Israeli Prime Minister Ehud Olmert that France would support an Israeli invasion of Syria and the overthrow of the government of President Bashar al-Assad, promising to veto any moves against Israel in the United Nations or European Union.

== Germany ==
Chancellor Angela Merkel says "We call on the powers in the region to seek to bring about a de-escalation of the situation. We cannot confuse cause and effect. The starting point is the capture of the Israeli soldiers. It is important that the government in Lebanon, which is on a peaceful path, should be strengthened, but it must be made clear that the capture [of the soldiers] cannot be tolerated. The attacks did not start from the Israeli side, but from Hezbollah's side." Sunday, German Development Minister Heidemarie Wieczorek-Zeul voiced criticism against Israel's attacks on civilian infrastructure in Lebanon, calling it "completely unacceptable."

== Greece ==
Spokesman Evangelos Antonaros urged Hezbollah to release the captured Israeli soldiers. "Greece expresses its serious concern and is intensely troubled," the spokesman said. "It is vital, to stop the (situation) worsening, Hezbollah must immediately release the soldiers taken hostage. At the same time, Greece calls on the government of Israel to avoid the use of excessive and pointless force which cannot provide a solution to the problem."

A demonstration took place on 25 July, near the embassy of the United States, with slogans such as "Down USA, down Israel".

== Italy ==
The Italian foreign minister Massimo D'Alema said "We have the impression that the (Israeli) reaction is out of proportion and dangerous for the consequences it could have, I think that this, apart from some nuances, is the way the whole international community sees the situation." He then added, "We are working for moves by the EU and the G8 in the next few hours to stop the spiral of violence," making reference to the G8 meeting planned for the weekend in St. Petersburg. He also condemned Hezbollah's assault on Israeli soldiers as "unacceptable," adding that Rome had asked for the release of the soldiers being held hostage.

On 16 July there were reports that Italy was attempting to broker an agreement between Israel and Lebanon. The Israelis would agree to a cease-fire immediately on two conditions:

1. The return of the two soldiers captured on 12 July.
2. The Army/Government of Lebanon would have to ensure that Hezbollah would pull back to the Litani River.

== Ireland ==
Minister for Foreign Affairs Dermot Ahern said "It is now in the interests of everyone in the region that all parties act urgently on the repeated calls to exercise restraint. They must cooperate with the diplomatic efforts to resolve the crisis without further death and suffering. The Israeli Government has a particular and immediate responsibility in this regard."

On 26 July, Ahern told RTÉ News that the Irish officer acting as liaison between the UN and the Israeli defence forces had warned them six times (before the airstrike that killed four UN observers) that their shelling was too close to UN positions. Ahern continued that the deaths were the result either of an incredible accident or of deliberate targeting. The concerns were passed onto the Israeli Ambassador to the Republic of Ireland Daniel Megiddo.

Following the Israeli air strike on Qana, on 30 July, the Taoiseach, Bertie Ahern said "This event strongly underlines the clear message the Government has been giving out which is that an immediate ceasefire on all sides is urgently necessary. Military actions are only making a solution more difficult."

A shipment of bombs being sent to Israel by the United States was banned using Irish airspace or airfields on 29 July. The weapons were part of a series of agreed arms shipments between the United States and Israel. The plane diverted to Prestwick Airport in Scotland.

On 2 August, The Oireachtas Committee for Foreign Affairs unanimously agreed a motion condemning the bloodshed in the Middle East and calling for an immediate ceasefire and the provision of humanitarian relief for those affected.

== Netherlands ==
The Dutch foreign minister Bernard Bot has expressed "understanding for Israel's reaction" but said "it would be hard to support Israel in case there will be many civilian casualties". Moreover, Israel should try everything it can to minimize civilian casualties.

== Norway ==
The Norwegian foreign minister Jonas Gahr Støre called Israel's reaction "totally unacceptable" and referred to it as "a dangerous escalation," while also condemning Hezbollah's attack on the Israeli soldiers and the kidnapping of the two Israeli soldiers.

Jonas Gahr Støre stated again on 30 July 2006, "The Israeli attack on the Lebanese village of Qana is a clear-cut violation of international law.".

However, he also stated, "Hezbollah has through its fighting taken the whole Lebanese population as hostage, which is totally unacceptable. The civilian population is targeted and the situation in southern Lebanon is unsafe both in safety and humanitarily. I support UN Emergency Relief Coordinator Jan Egeland's demand of a 72-hour ceasefire and the creation of a supply line to send first aid supplies to Southern Lebanon".

== Romania ==
On 13 July, the Romanian Foreign Affairs Ministry (MAE) voiced concern over the crisis. The ministry called on the parties involved to show calm and refrain from any actions that might further deteriorate the situation and might lead to new victims and inflict material damages. The MAE also stated that Hezbollah should free the two captured Israeli soldiers immediately and unconditionally and stop the attacks on Israel.

On 19 July, Romanian President Traian Băsescu said in a press conference that "we are starting to face a humanitarian crisis" and urged UN Security Council to quickly adopt a solution to put an end to the insecurity in the area. "We recognize Israel's right to security but it has generated a humanitarian crisis", "Both parties must protect civilians", and "The incapacity of the international community to enforce the UN resolutions led to a humanitarian disaster" Băsescu said. Also present, Foreign Affairs Minister Răzvan Ungureanu said that "it is absolutely necessary that hostilities cease".

== Russia ==
Russia sharply criticized Israel over its onslaught against Lebanon, sparked when Hezbollah militants captured two Israeli soldiers. The Russian Foreign Minister Sergei Lavrov said Israel's actions have gone "far beyond the boundaries of an anti-terrorist operation" and repeating calls for an immediate cease-fire.

Foreign minister said "this is a disproportionate response to what has happened and if both sides are going to drive each other into a tight corner then I think that all this will develop in a very dramatic and tragic way." He added: "We firmly reaffirm support for Lebanon's sovereignty and territorial integrity."

Russian Defense Minister Sergei Ivanov called on both sides to quickly calm the situation and said Hezbollah should stop using "terrorist methods."

Russian President Vladimir Putin has urged both sides to halt their military actions.

Putin also called on Israel to show restraint, and a Russian newsagency said "Putin believes that Israel pursues other aims in the Middle East, except for the return of hostages."

== Spain ==
Spain's Prime Minister José Luis Rodríguez Zapatero issued a statement saying that "From my point of view, Israel is wrong. One thing is self defense, and the other is to launch a counter offensive consisting on a general attack in Lebanon and Gaza that is just going to further escalate violence in the area" . The Spanish Government asked also Israel to act with moderation and in proportion to these events given the need to avoid a spreading of violence, which would put the stability of the region in danger and would have as its principal victim, once again, the civilian population. Spain also called on Hezbollah to release the two Israeli soldiers.

On Saturday, 22 July 2006:

12:10 p.m.: The prime ministers of Spain and Turkey appealed to world leaders and international bodies to help stop hostilities in the Middle East, saying the violence threatened to drag the entire region into a "chaotic deadlock." In a joint declaration, Recep Tayyip Erdogan of Turkey and Spain's Jose Luis Rodriguez Zapatero offered to contribute to efforts toward a cease-fire. Turkey's Erdogan spoke with Bush by phone earlier in the day.

== Sweden ==
The minister of foreign affairs Jan Eliasson said on 13 July (translated) "The military offensive of Israel is an extremely dangerous escalation of the situation in the region". He condemned the attack of Hezbollah, but said that the line of proportionality in the reaction had been crossed. "I am deeply critical that the civilian population is being affected."

On 30 July, Jan Eliasson said "It is time to end this madness. The UN Security Council must accept its responsibility and immediately adopt a resolution to bring an end to hostilities."

== Switzerland ==
On 13 July, the Swiss Department of Foreign Affairs condemned Israel's "disproportionate" military actions in Lebanon and stated that "Israel's reply should remain strictly proportional and not threaten a non-hostile neighboring state." It also condemned "the Hezbollah attacks against settlements in Northern Israel, which also violate international humanitarian law". The department expressed concerns of a regional conflict being ignited and called on all parties to de-escalate the situation.

On 27 July, the Swiss Federal Council held a special meeting to discuss the crisis. The Council announced that it deplored the human tragedy of the conflict and that it would reinforce its humanitarian aid measures; it also allocated CHF 5 million in emergency aid for the ICRC. The government's failure to reiterate the foreign department's criticism of Israel and its decision not to cancel the Swiss cooperation with the Israeli armaments industry were considered by the press to be a rebuke to outspoken Socialist foreign minister Micheline Calmy-Rey by the Council's center-right majority.

== Turkey ==
Turkish former foreign minister Abdullah Gül (former president of Turkey) urges for all sides in the Middle East to agree to a ceasefire quickly in order to prevent a further escalation from occurring. "I invite everyone to a ceasefire quickly. If a ceasefire is delayed, I see the risk of an escalation and the complete destruction of the opportunity for co-existence," Gül told reporters.

Prime Minister Recep Tayyip Erdoğan issued a statement in which he expressed his concerns about the goals of Israel and questioned whether it is "the complete invasion of Palestine", and pointed out "If that is indeed the case, certainly there will be repercussions from the entire humanity. The children of Palestine are as valuable as those of Israel." Erdoğan criticized the Israeli counterattacks, stating that "While the kidnapping in Palestine was both negative and wrong, a tenfold use of excessive force is even more so. No reason can justify bombing civilians and laying waste to cities in a merciless manner." Erdoğan also mentioned that he got a phone call from Fuad Sinyora, the Prime Minister of Lebanon, where Sinyora explained to him that "they were being wrongfully accused of a crime they did not commit" and asked him to intervene in behalf of a cease-fire. "We are going to contribute in every way we can," Erdoğan said in his statement.

== United Kingdom ==
The government of the UK was hesitant in calling for an "immediate" stop to the fighting, and British Foreign Secretary Margaret Beckett said that "a call to the end the violence" must form an element of a "long-term peace plan." An envoy for the EU said that Britain would "pay a heavy political price" if it continued to oppose the call for an immediate cease-fire.

On 25 July, a poll was published in The Guardian indicating that only 22% of Britons believed Israel's response to the Hezbollah incursion was proportionate. The poll also showed a majority (63% of those surveyed) believe Prime Minister Blair is keeping Britain too close to the United States.

Prime Minister Tony Blair personally urged for a calm mediation between both sides. "I entirely understand the desire, and indeed need, for Israel to defend itself properly and I also understand the plight of Lebanon and the Lebanese government, not to say the many Palestinians that suffer as well," he said. "The only way we are going to get this situation resolved is if we support the UN mission, get some calm into the situation and then as soon as possible... get back in to the road map towards a two-state solution that offers the only chance for stability and peace in the future." Blair also underscored the tragedy that the crisis has brought to the region. "What is happening is absolutely tragic for all the people involved, but the only solution is that the international community empowers the moderates on both sides to come to a solution." On 16 July, Prime Minister Blair blamed Iran and Syria for the flare-up in the Middle East.

On 22 July Kim Howells, Foreign Office minister with responsibility for the Middle East, criticised Israel's bombardment of Lebanon while on a visit to Beirut. He said "The destruction of the infrastructure, the death of so many children and so many people. These have not been surgical strikes. And it's very difficult, I think, to understand the kind of military tactics that have been used. You know, if they're chasing Hezbollah, then go for Hezbollah. You don't go for the entire Lebanese nation."

On 25 July Menzies Campbell, leader of the Liberal Democrats, wrote to Blair demanding the suspension of all future arms exports to Israel including the removal of 'special licences'. His letter followed the publication of a report detailing British arms sales to Israel by four Government departments. Campbell stated in his letter; "In light of disproportionate military action by Israel in Lebanon and Gaza the UK government must suspend any further arms exports to Israel."

On 27 July British Foreign Secretary Margaret Beckett protested to the government of the United States via US Secretary of State Condoleezza Rice about its use of Prestwick Airport, Scotland to transport bombs to Israel. The laser guided munitions were allegedly transported using two chartered Airbus A310 cargo planes.

On 28 July, former British Foreign Secretary and current Leader of the House of Commons Jack Straw called the Israeli response "disproportionate"

On 29 July former British Foreign Secretary and current Leader of the House of Commons Jack Straw warned that Israel's military action "could further destabilise the already fragile Lebanese nation", while noting that "Israel has clear rights to defend itself proportionately". He added that he grieved equally "for all those innocent Israeli civilians killed in the conflict" and the "10 times as many innocent Lebanese, men women and children, killed by Israeli fire".

On 30 July the British Ambassador to the UN, Emyr Jones Parry, urged the Security Council to call for an immediate end to hostilities and work for a political resolution of the crisis.

On 30 July anti-war protestors at Scotland's Prestwick Airport managed to have a chartered plane laden with bombs en route from Texas to Tel Aviv diverted to RAF Mildenhall in Suffolk, England. The bombs are part of a series of agreed arms shipments between the United States Government and Israel and were diverted originally from Irish airspace as the Irish Government refused to allow the aircraft permission to land. The transport of weapons to Israel via British airspace has caused embarrassment for the British Government although the shipments are to continue.

== Holy See ==
On 14 July, resigning Secretary of State Cardinal Angelo Sodano said that "the Holy See condemns both the terroristic attacks of one side and the military reprisals of the other. Indeed, the right to defense of one State does not exempt it from respect of the norms of international law, especially as regards the protection of civilian populations. In particular, the Holy See deplores now the attack on Lebanon, a free and sovereign nation, and assures its closeness to those populations, who already have suffered so much to defend their independence."

These statements have drawn some criticism, both inside and outside the Vatican, for what is seen as a pro-Arab and anti-Israeli bias on Sodano's part. It is believed that earlier incidents of a similar nature have contributed to the current Pope accepting Sodano's resignation on 22 June 2006, although Sodano will remain in office until 15 September. Following declarations from the Pope himself have expressed equal concern for the suffering of people on both Lebanon and Israel, and a constant request for a ceasefire.

On 16 July, during the weekly Angelus prayer, Pope Benedict XVI expressed strong concern for the escalation of military action and the numerous civilian casualties. He admitted that the conflict had been originated by "objective violations of right and justice", but stated that "neither terroristic acts nor reprisals are justifiable, especially when they have tragic consequences on the civilian population", and said that the path of war does not lead to positive results. After mentioning that the Israeli city of Haifa had been heavily struck, the Pope prayed for peace and concord.

During an exchange with the press on 19 July, the Pope commented: "I fully agree with the G8 statement." The G8 asked that Israel act with restraint but laid the blame for the conflict on Hezbollah.

On 23 July, the Pope proclaimed a special day of prayer and penance for peace. He renewed his appeal to the combatants, asking that they cease fire, allow the sending of humanitarian aid, and begin negotiations with the help of the international community. Then the Pope reaffirmed "the right of the Lebanese to the integrity and sovereignty of their country, the right of Israelis to live in peace in their state, and the right of Palestinians to have a free and sovereign country." He also expressed solidarity for civilian populations who suffer because of a conflict in which they are "mere victims", both the Israelis forced to live in shelters and the Lebanese who see their country destroyed and have to seek refuge elsewhere.

On 30 July, the Pope deplored the "increasingly tragic" situation in the Middle East and how "in the hearts of many, hatred and will of vengeance seem to grow". He said that "these facts show how it is not possible to reestablish justice [...] using the instrument of violence". The Pope exclaimed that those responsible should immediately cease hostilities, "in the name of God". Then he asked governments and international institutions to make every effort to that end, and asked people of good will to continue sending relief aid and praying God for peace.
