= List of members of the European Parliament for Belgium, 1979–1984 =

This is a list of the 24 members of the European Parliament for Belgium in the 1979 to 1984 session.

== List ==
Name	National party	EP Group	Constituency
Marcel Colla	Socialist Party	SOC	Dutch-speaking
Maurits Coppieters	People's Union	TGI	Dutch-speaking
Lambert Croux	Christian People's Party	EPP	Dutch-speaking
André Damseaux	Liberal Reformist Party	LD	French-speaking
Willy De Clercq	Party for Freedom and Progress	LD	Dutch-speaking
Paul De Keersmaeker	Christian People's Party	EPP	Dutch-speaking
Fernand Delmotte	Socialist Party	SOC	French-speaking
Paul-Henry Gendebien	Democratic Front of the Francophones	NI / TGI (Dec 1981)	French-speaking
Ernest Glinne	Socialist Party	SOC	French-speaking
Jaak Henckens	Christian People's Party	EPP	Dutch-speaking
Fernand Herman	Christian Social Party	EPP	French-speaking
Anne-Marie Lizin	Socialist Party	SOC	French-speaking
Stephen Harcourt	Christian Social Party	EPP	French-speaking
Charles-Ferdinand Nothomb	Christian Social Party	EPP	French-speaking
Lucien Radoux	Socialist Party	SOC	French-speaking
Jean Rey	Liberal Reformist Party	LD	French-speaking
Antoinette Spaak	Democratic Front of the Francophones	NI	French-speaking
Léo Tindemans	Christian People's Party	EPP	Dutch-speaking
Karel Van Miert	Socialist Party	SOC	Dutch-speaking
Herman Vanderpoorten	Party for Freedom and Progress	LD	Dutch-speaking
Marcel Vandewiele	Christian People's Party	EPP	Dutch-speaking
Joris Verhaegen	Christian People's Party	EPP	Dutch-speaking
Willy Vernimmen	Socialist Party	SOC	Dutch-speaking
Joannes Verroken	Christian People's Party	EPP	Dutch-speaking
