= Véronique De Keyser =

Belgian politician

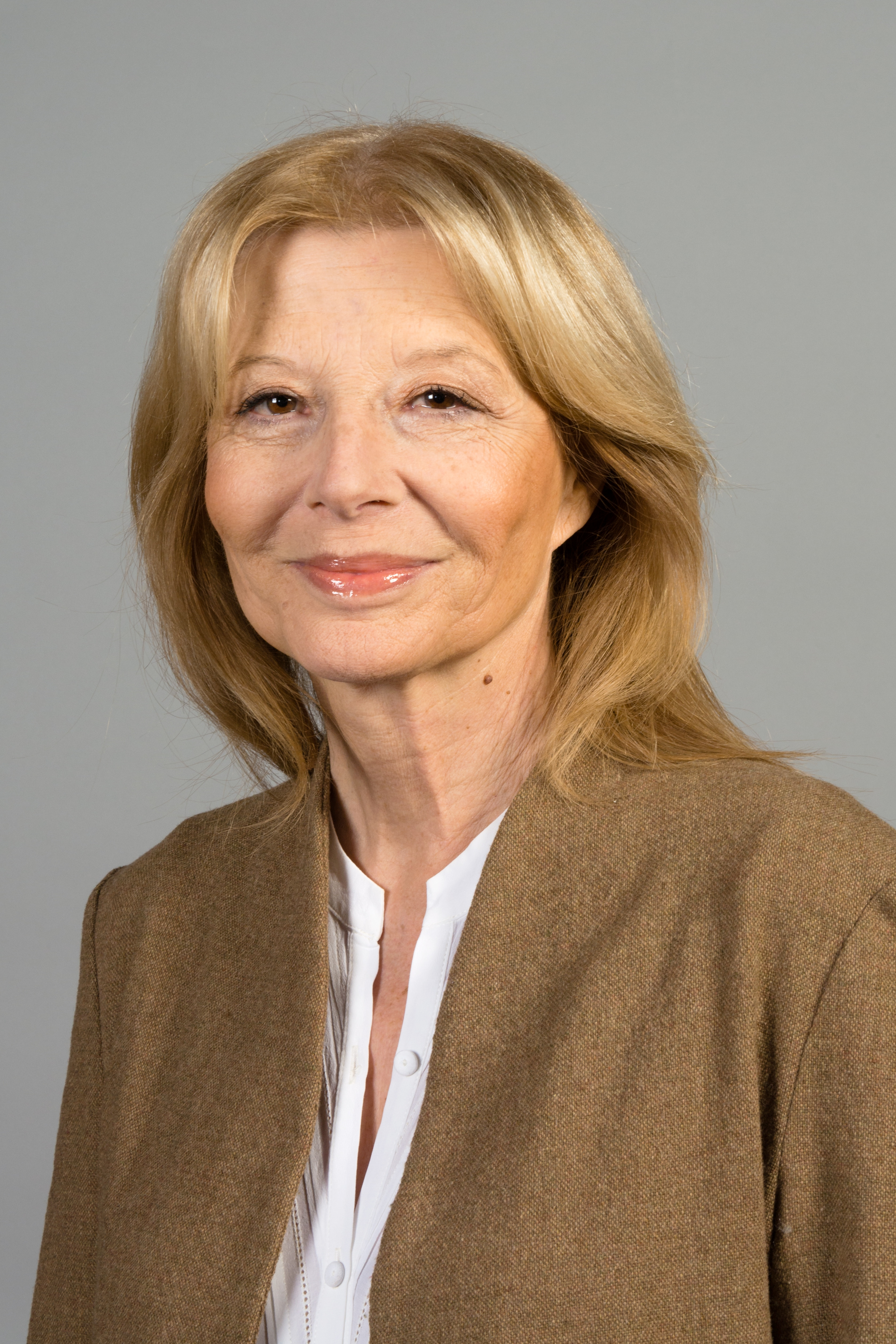
- Véronique De Keyser 2014
- Born: 23 March 1945 (age 80); Brussels, Belgium
- Occupation: politician

Video Introduction (English) / (French)

Véronique Marie Alice Henriette De Keyser (born 23 March 1945) is a Belgian politician who served as a Member of the European Parliament from 2001 until 2014. She is a member of the Parti Socialiste, part of the Socialist Group

De Keyser majored in Psychology at the Université libre de Bruxelles (1968) and has a doctorate in work psychology (1974).

In parliament, De Keyser served on the Committee on Foreign Affairs. She was also a substitute for the Committee on Women's Rights and Gender Equality and the Committee on the Internal Market and Consumer Protection.

== Mandates ==
- Member of the European Parliament (from 2001)
- Municipal councillor of Liège (since 2006)
- Named Head of Election Observation Mission in Palestine in 2005 for the 2006 elections
- Named Head of Election Observation Mission in Sudan in 2010 for the 2010 elections
- Named Head of Election Observation Mission in South Sudan in 2011 for the 2011 referendum

== Education ==
- 1968: Degree in psychology, Free University of Brussels (ULB)
- 1974: Doctorate in work psychology with Approche psychologique de l'expérience ouvrière à travers les systèmes

== Career ==
- 1968-1984: Researcher in psychology at the ULB and the Brussels Industrial Study and Research Centre
- 1984: Junior lecturer at the University of Liège
- 1988: Lecturer at the University of Liège
- 1990-1998: Dean of the Psychology and Education Science Faculty at the University of Liège
- Visiting lecturer at the Universities of Oporto, Moscow and Toulouse-Le Mirail
- 1990-1994: President of the Belgian Psychology Society
- 1995-2016: Administrator at the King Baudouin Foundation
- 2001-2014: Member of the European Parliament
- 1997-2003: President of the European Work and Organisational Psychology Association

== Academics ==
Work psychology professor at the University of Liège and former Dean of the faculty of Psychology, municipal councilor of Liège, she has become a specialist in work conditions, stress, labour, and specifically labour of young people. She denounces, through her political action and her writings, the degrading conditions of workers and work in Europe of this past decade.

== Politics ==
In the June 2009 elections, Véronique De Keyser was elected for her third mandate as member of the European Parliament, and at the same time beginning her first mandate as vice-president of the Socialists and Democrats (S&D) Group. She is a member of the EP Committee on Development (DEVE), the EP Subcommittee on Human Rights (DROI), the Delegation to the ACP–EU Joint Parliamentary Assembly, the Delegation for relations with the Palestinian Legislative Council, and is a substitute for the Committee on Foreign Affairs.

In 2001, Véronique De Keyser became a Member of the European Parliament, a position which followed a long international scientific career. She began her studies at the Université libre de Bruxelles in Psychology, where she obtained her doctorate in work psychology in 1974. She will then first be in charge of classes in the University of Liège in 1984, then Ordinary Professor in 1988 and finally dean of the Faculty of Psychology from 1990 to 1998. Her academic career – which will see her become an internationally recognised specialist in applied research in security and human reliability in risk environments as well as in ergonomics – will allow her to build bridges between a variety of scientific communities and to develop academic collaborations with the United States of America, Russia, South America and Africa. She was president of the "European Work and Organizational Psychology Association" (EAWOP), president of the Ergonomics Society of the French Language, and director of the Excellency Center of the University of Liège on the modeling of temporal reasoning in dynamic situations. She has written over one hundred articles and many scientific works.

Throughout her political career, Véronique De Keyser maintained a strong commitment to the Belgian Socialist Party. She entered the European Parliament for her first mandate on 12 September 2001, in the wake of the 9/11 terror attacks in New York City. She then became a member of the Committee on External Affairs and a substitute in the Committee on Environment. She was vigorously outspoken against the American intervention in Iraq, and voiced her political commitment very early on issues related to the Middle East, human rights, and women's rights. She regularly went on missions to multiple countries in the Middle East including Syria and Palestine. At the end of 2005, during her second mandate, she is named Head of the Election Observation Mission in Palestine in 2005 for the 2006 elections.

During her third term as Member of the European Parliament, Véronique De Keyser continues to fight in favour of the peoples of the Southern Mediterranean on the eve of the Arab Spring. She also turns towards Africa and development policies of the EU. She will, once again, be named Head of the Election Observation Mission in Sudan in 2010 for the presidential, legislative and local elections, and once more for the South Sudan independence referendum of July 2011.

In the European Parliament, her work carried on with countries in democratic transition (Arab Spring), especially on the Middle East, Syria, Palestine, and conflict regions of Africa. She has defended democracy, peace, reinforcement of fragiles states, consolidation of progressive parties, women's rights, humanities, the fight against torture and in particular that of children, the fight against using children as soldiers, and against child sorcers.

== Titles and awards ==
- 1986: NATO Science Award
- 1988: Chevalier de l'Ordre de Léopold
- 1996: Prix Santé et Entreprises
- 1997: Commandeur de l'Ordre de la Couronne
- 1999: Maria Sibylla-Merian prize awarded to women scientists for their outstanding achievements mainly in the natural and technical sciences, as well as in medicine
- 2011: Théroigne de Méricourt prize of Walloon Synergy

== See also ==
- 2004 European Parliament election in Belgium

== Bibliography ==
- De Keyser, V., Qvale, T., Wilpert, B., & Ruiz Quintanilla, S.A (Eds)(1988) The Meaning of Work and Technology Option. Wiley & Sons
- De Keyser, V. & Van Daele, A. (Eds)(1989). The ergonomics of conception. Editions De Boeck
- Cellier, J.M., De Keyser, V, & Valot, C. (1996) La Gestion du temps dans les environnements dynamiques, Presses Universitaires de France
- De Keyser, V. & Leonova, A. (2001) – Human error prevention and well being at work in Western Europe and Russia, Kluwer Publisher
- De Keyser, V. (2002) – Human Error, Editions Labor
- De Keyser, V. (2003) – To life and to death, Editions Labor
- De Keyser, V. (2008) – Petits crimes sans importance. Critiques de la flexibilité au travail en Europe, Editions Luc Pire
- Hessel, S. & De Keyser, V. (2013) – Palestine, the European betrayal, Editions Fayard
- Thesis in psychology, 1974 – Psychological approach of workers' experience through automated systems.
