= Fitna (film) =

- Title card for Fitna
- Written by: Geert Wilders
- Music by: Edvard Grieg; Pyotr Ilyich Tchaikovsky
- Distributed by: LiveLeak
- Release date: 27 March 2008
- Running time: 17 minutes
- Country: Netherlands
- Languages: Dutch; English; Arabic; Persian; Turkish

Fitna (Arabic: فِتْنَة) is a 2008 short film by Dutch politician Geert Wilders. Approximately 17 minutes in length, the film attempts to demonstrate that the Qur'an motivates its followers to hate all who violate Islamic teachings. The film shows selected excerpts from Surahs of the Qur'an, interspersed with media clips and newspaper cuttings showing or describing acts of violence by Muslims worldwide.

The film argues that Islam encourages – among other things – acts of terrorism, antisemitism, violence against women, violence against LGBT people and against infidels, as well as subjugation of all non-Muslims: Islamic universalism. A large part of the film details the influence of Islam on the Netherlands. The film was published on the Internet in 2008. Shortly before its release, its announcement was suspended from its website by the American provider because of the perceived controversy. It stirred a still continuing debate in the Netherlands as well as abroad.

The Arabic title-word "fitna" means "disagreement and division among people" or "a test of faith in times of trial".

== Production ==
The Friends of the Party for Freedom (PVV) foundation commissioned the film. It contracted a production company credited in the film as "Scarlet Pimpernel Productions", a pseudonym adopted out of fear of reprisal. In fact large parts of the documentary Obsession: Radical Islam's War Against the West written by Wayne Kopping and Raphael Shore were copied. Both films have been described as part of the counter-jihad movement.

== Release ==
The exact nature of Fitna's release was uncertain up until its official launch. This was due to concerns of the legality of its content and anticipated acts of terrorism. The Dutch press centre Nieuwspoort offered to release the film, on the condition that Wilders would pay for the increased security required during the press conference and the weeks after it. Wilders declined to do so, citing prohibitive costs.

Having failed to successfully negotiate a transmission of the film with any Dutch television station, Wilders created a website, www.fitnathemovie.com, on 5 March 2008 with the intention of releasing the film. However, this was subsequently suspended (see below).

On 22 March, the Dutch Muslim Broadcasting Association (NMO) nl offered to air the film, on the proviso that it could be previewed for any possible illegal material and that Wilders would take part in a debate with proponents and opponents afterwards. Wilders declined, quoted as saying "No way, NMO."

Wilders released the film on 27 March 2008 on the video website LiveLeak. The following day, LiveLeak removed the film from their servers after receiving threats that they described as being "of a very serious nature". The film soon appeared on various BitTorrent and video sharing websites.

LiveLeak reinstated Fitna on 30 March, after security upgrades offering increased protection to its staff had been implemented. Soon after, Wilders withdrew the film to make some minor edits, such as removing the copyrighted Jyllands-Posten Muhammad cartoons. Kurt Westergaard, the cartoonist, was pleased with the news and believed the lawsuit would be dropped. In September 2008, Wilders agreed to pay Westergaard 7500 euros for using his Jyllands-Posten cartoon without permission.

A revised edition, containing a new cartoon in place of the contentious one, and a corrected picture of Bouyeri, was released on LiveLeak on 6 April.

=== Distribution ===
On 14 December 2008, a conference entitled "Facing Jihad" was organized at the Menachem Begin Heritage Center in Jerusalem. Geert Wilders, Aryeh Eldad, Robert Spencer, Itamar Marcus, Daniel Pipes, Shlomo Sharan, and John David Lewis were in attendance. During the conference, Fitna was put on view and distributed to all conference attendees; it was announced that it would be shown in several European parliaments. The Ruder Finn PR company organized the conference and set up the group's website, and are also actively distributing the film. Finn distributed the film for free.

== Plot ==
The film shows a selection of Suras from the Qur'an, interspersed with newspaper clippings and media clips with The Arabian Dance and Åses død as an underscore.

=== Themes ===
Wilders described the film as a push for a leidcultuur, a culture that "draws on Christian, Jewish, humanistic traditions and that poses a challenge to the Islamic problem".

==== The Qur'an and terrorism ====
Al-Anfal 60 is shown next to a video of the attacks of September 11.

Suras are juxtaposed to video clips of imams stating Islamic teaching, and videos of violent atrocities committed in the name of Islam, including major terrorist attacks.

The first Sura of the film, Al-Anfal verse 60,^{[8:60]} is translated as:

Prepare for them whatever force and cavalry ye are able of gathering, to strike terror, to strike terror into the hearts of the enemies, of Allah and your enemies.

Footage of the September 11 attacks is shown, followed by the Madrid train bombings. Imam Abu Hamza al-Masri rises above the smoke and declares "Allah is happy when non-Muslims get killed." Stills taken from the 7 July 2005 London bombings show an exploded bus and the underground train.

The next Sura, An-Nisa verse 56,^{[4:56]} is shown as a justification for Islamic antisemitism. Sheikh Bakr Al-Samarai is shown raising a sword while declaring: "If Allah permits us, O nation of Mohammed, even the stone will say O Muslim. A Jew is hiding behind me, come and cut off his head. And we shall cut off his head! By Allah, we shall cut it off! O Jews! Allahu Akbar! Jihad for the sake of Allah!" An auditorium of several hundred people respond with approving chants and fist shaking.

Following this, a three-year-old Muslim girl, says that Jews are "apes and pigs" in an interview on Iqraa TV.

Sura 47, verse 4^{[47:4]} is shown in relation to the murder of Dutch film director Theo Van Gogh, committed by Mohammed Bouyeri. Bouyeri is reported as saying: "If I had the opportunity to get out of prison, and I had the opportunity to do it again, what I did on November 2nd, Allah I would have done exactly the same". Protesters are shown supporting Van Gogh's murder, warning others to heed the lesson or "pay with your blood".

Dutch newspaper headlines are reproduced, outlining intimidating threats of murder to prominent critics of Islam, followed by footage of Eugene Armstrong's beheading. Armstrong's disembodied head is shown held up by Al-Qaeda terrorists.

==== The Qur'an as a means for Islamic universalism ====
Ayatollah 'Ali Meshkini speaks at a Friday sermon, declaring "Islam is a religion that wants to rule the world. It has done so before and eventually, will rule it again".

The final Sura used in the film is Quran 8:39:^{[8:39]}

Fight them until there is no dissension, and the religion is entirely Allah's.

President Mahmoud Ahmadinejad of Iran is quoted as saying:

The message of the [Iranian] Revolution is global, and is not restricted to a specific place or time. Have no doubt... Allah willing, Islam will conquer what? It will conquer all the mountain tops of the world.

Ibrahim Mudeiris is seen speaking to a congregation. He says: "We have ruled the world before, and by Allah, the day will come when we will rule the entire world again! The day will come when we will rule America. The day will come when we rule Britain and the entire world!" Abdul Rahman Saleem speaks in English: "You will take over the USA! You will take over the UK! You will take over Europe! You will defeat them all! You will get victory! You will take over Egypt! We trust in Allah!" Demonstrators outside the Danish embassy to Britain are shown holding signs that read: "Islam will dominate the world" and "Freedom go to hell".

==== Islam and the Netherlands ====
The film's depiction of a girl being strapped down in preparation for female genital mutilation.

The final segment of the film deals with issues related to Islam in the Netherlands, under the heading: "The Netherlands under the spell of Islam". These issues include opposition to democracy, Islamic views on homosexuality and women's treatment in Islam.

An unidentified person claims that "The mosque will be part of the system of the government of Holland", in an apparent refusal to accept liberal democracy. Wilders juxtaposes a newspaper headline "Cabinet: no ban on burqa" against a Muslim woman fully covered up. A graph illustrating the number of Muslims in the Netherlands since 1909 is shown against a background of Muslim women. Dutch police are shown removing their shoes before entering a mosque. A Dutch Muslim expresses his desire to enact an honour killing, if his mother or sister commits zina, the Islamic concept of extramarital sex. Another condemns homosexuality, saying "Islam considers something like that a crime".

A postcard is shown, ostensibly from the Netherlands, with pictures of mosques in place of visitor attractions, with the words "Groeten uit Nederland" ("Greetings from the Netherlands") superimposed.

Audio recordings that are said to have been taken from mosques in the Netherlands show Imams denouncing political parties, "worldly concepts like liberalism [and] democracy". Another states that female adulterers must be "stoned" to death, even when the man commits the adultery. A graphic image of gays being hanged, under Sharia law is a depiction of a possible future dystopian Netherlands. A series of clips show female genital cutting, a woman's disembodied head lying on a floor, and a burqa-clad woman being shot through the head by a man.

Finally, a succession of newspaper headlines are shown, containing stories related to Islam in the Netherlands, their views, actions, ambitions and politics. Some verified headlines are:

- "Sudanese demand execution of British 'miss teddy bear'" (see Sudanese teddy bear blasphemy case)
- "Almost half of young Moroccans anti-Western"
- "Throw gays from tall buildings"
- "Al-Qaeda proclaims death penalty Jihad against Wilders"

The film ends with a hand seen gripping a page of the Qur'an and a call to action from Wilders to defeat "Islamic ideology", likening it to Communism and Nazism.

=== Quranic chapters ===
An-Nisa 56, translated here as: "Those who have disbelieved our signs, we shall roast them in fire. Whenever their skins are cooked to a turn, we shall substitute new skins for them, that they may feel the punishment; Verily Allah is sublime and wise."

The following Suras are mentioned in Fitna in order of appearance. The translation is from Pickthall's The Meaning of the Glorious Koran. Only the passages marked as bold are included in the quotations in the film, while the related passages are omitted.

Al-Anfal (The Spoils of War) Q8:60–61

Make ready for them all thou canst of (armed) force and of horses tethered, that thereby ye may dismay the enemy of Allah and your enemy, and others beside them whom ye know not. Allah knoweth them. Whatsoever ye spend in the way of Allah it will be repaid to you in full, and ye will not be wronged. And if they incline to peace, incline thou also to it, and trust in Allah. Lo! He, even He, is the Hearer, the Knower.

An-Nisa (The Women) Q4:56–57

Lo! Those who disbelieve Our revelations, We shall expose them to the Fire. As often as their skins are consumed We shall exchange them for fresh skins that they may taste the torment. Lo! Allah is ever Mighty, Wise. And as for those who believe and do good works, We shall make them enter Gardens underneath which rivers flow – to dwell therein for ever; there for them are pure companions—and We shall make them enter plenteous shade.

Muhammad (Muhammad) Q47:4

Now when ye meet in battle those who disbelieve, then it is smiting of the necks until, when ye have routed them, then making fast of bonds; and afterward either grace or ransom till the war lay down its burdens. That (is the ordinance). And if Allah willed He could have punished them (without you) but (thus it is ordained) that He may try some of you by means of others. And those who are slain in the way of Allah, He rendereth not their actions vain.

An-Nisa (The Women) Q4:89–90

They long that ye should disbelieve even as they disbelieve, that ye may be upon a level (with them). So choose not friends from them till they forsake their homes in the way of Allah; if they turn back (to enmity) then take them and kill them wherever ye find them, and choose no friend nor helper from among them, Except those who seek refuge with a people between whom and you there is a covenant, or (those who) come unto you because their hearts forbid them to make war on you or make war on their own folk. Had Allah willed He could have given them power over you so that assuredly they would have fought you. So, if they hold aloof from you and wage not war against you and offer you peace, Allah alloweth you no way against them.

Al-Anfal (The Spoils of War) Q8:38–39

Tell those who disbelieve that if they cease (from persecution of believers) that which is past will be forgiven them; but if they return (thereto) then the example of the men of old hath already gone (before them, for a warning). And fight them until persecution is no more, and religion is all for Allah. But if they cease, then lo! Allah is Seer of what they do

=== Differences between first and second release ===
The first edition used copyrighted Jyllands-Posten Muhammad cartoons without permission. These were removed from the second edition.

Also in the first edition of the film, and removed from the second edition, when referring to the murder of Theo van Gogh a picture of the Dutch rapper Salah Edin is displayed instead of the murderer Mohammed Bouyeri. The picture was shot for the rapper's album 'Nederlands Grootste Nachtmerrie' (Netherlands' Worst Nightmare), which according to the singer's website, was shot to be 'exactly like the mugshot of convicted killer Mohamed B'. A 2007 article by Dutch tabloid newspaper DAG had illustrated an article about the killer with the photograph. On that occasion, Salah Edin's received an out-of-court libel settlement for the publication. The photo was said by the rapper to be intended to depict "the way the average white Dutch citizen sees me, as a young Moroccan Muslim radical. That's why I chose to do this picture and use it for the front cover of my album. It is in no way supporting the deeds of Mohamed B."

== Reaction ==
International reaction to Fitna consisted of condemnation in the Muslim community, fatwās by Al-Qaeda and an Australian imam calling for the beheading of Geert Wilders, and attempts by Southeast Asian countries to censor the film. The Dutch government allegedly "distanced itself from the film".

Indonesia, the most populous Muslim country and itself a Dutch colony until 1949, has conducted a ban on several web sites, such as YouTube, MySpace, RapidShare and Metacafe, as directed by the Ministry of Communications and Informations. On April 11, the Indonesian government lifted the ban. Indonesian communications minister Muhammad Nuh apologised to the public for the inconvenience.

Geert Wilders' film failed to generate much "controversy" in Iran although the government did express its outrage on the day of its release and conservative websites complained about it for a while. By and large, Fitna elicited indifference among the general public. There was an anti-Fitna demonstration, but just 30 people turned up and they were carrying signs that had "nothing to do with the film".

In response to the film, Dutch Minister of Foreign Affairs Maxime Verhagen published an op-ed in the Arabic-language newspaper Asharq al Awsat on March 30. In the article, he asks of the readers to "keep the head cool and the relations warm" and urged dialogue, not provocation, as a means to bridge the cultural differences.

On 1 April, a debate was held about the film in the Dutch parliament. In this debate, the government and Geert Wilders accused each other of lying about facts of their previous communication. According to various members of the government, Wilders had told in previous conversations about his intentions to tear parts out of the Qur'an and setting them on fire. Wilders denied this.

=== Legal actions ===
One of the Jyllands-Posten Muhammad cartoons was included in the film without the permission of the artist, Kurt Westergaard. Westergaard asserted that this infringed his copyright and was considering taking legal action against Wilders. The Danish Union of Journalists has said it will file a lawsuit on Westergaard's behalf. Similarly, Dutch director Rob Muntz announced he was to file a lawsuit because of the uncredited use of his interview with Theo van Gogh.

In 2010 and 2011 Wilders was accused of criminally insulting religious and ethnic groups and inciting hatred and discrimination. However, he was found not guilty in June 2011.

On 12 February 2009, Wilders was denied entry to the United Kingdom after being invited by the Lord Pearson of the United Kingdom Independence Party to show his film in the House of Lords. He declared this "a sad day for the United Kingdom" and accused the government of cowardice. Wilders appealed the ban, and on 13 October 2009, it was overturned by the Asylum and Immigration Tribunal. The UK Home Office then stated its intention not to appeal the tribunal decision, and Wilders' planned visit to the UK went ahead, with his arriving in the country on 16 October 2009. Wilders described the decision to overturn the ban as a "victory for freedom of speech".

=== Films made in response ===
On 28 March, a film was released by the Arab European League, named Al Mouftinoun. A Saudi blogger made a contra-film in April called Schism. It was also released on LiveLeak.

== Sequel ==
Wilders has stated that he plans to release a sequel to Fitna. In March 2010, Wilders announced that he plans to release a second movie about the spread of Islam, but not until after Dutch elections in June. He said the sequel to his 2008 film would focus on the consequences of mass migration from Muslim countries, freedom of expression, and Sharia or Muslim law. He indicated that he received help from professionals in the US to make his film. In 2017, Wilders announced on Twitter that he was making a sequel.

== See also ==
- Arnoud van Doorn
- Criticism of Islam
- Freedom of speech
- Submission – 2004 Dutch short film critical of Islam
