= Q47 =

Q47 may refer to:

- Q47 (New York City bus)
- French submarine Circé (Q47)
- Muhammad (surah), the 47th surah of the Quran
