= Gendebien =

Gendebien is a surname. Notable people with this surname include:

- Alexandre Gendebien (1789–1869), Belgian lawyer and participant in the Belgian Revolution
- Blake Gendebien, American farmer and Congressional candidate, see 2026 United States House of Representatives elections in New York
- Olivier Gendebien (1924–1998), Belgian racing driver
- Paul-Henry Gendebien (1939–2024), Belgian economist and politician
