= French-speaking electoral college =

Constituency of the European Parliament

- European Parliament constituency
- Location among the current constituencies

- Shown within Belgium
- Member state: Belgium
- Created: 1979
- MEPs: 8

The French-speaking electoral college is one of three constituencies of the European Parliament in Belgium. It currently elects 8 MEPs using the D'Hondt method of party-list proportional representation. It elected 9 MEPs until the 2007 accession of Bulgaria and Romania.

Prior to the 1999 elections, electors in the German-speaking community were voting in the French-speaking electoral college, along with the rest of the Walloon region where they are located; they vote now in their own German-speaking electoral college.

== Boundaries ==
The constituency corresponds to the French Community of Belgium. In officially bilingual Brussels, electors can choose between lists of this electoral college or those of the Dutch-speaking electoral college. In the rest of the country, voters vote according to the region in which they reside.

Prior to the 2011–2012 state reform, electors could choose between both lists not only in Brussels, but in an area encompassing unilingually Dutch territory, Brussels-Halle-Vilvoorde. Some towns in the officially Dutch-speaking Brussels Periphery still have this option however.

== Members of the European Parliament ==
Representatives of the French-Speaking community (1979–present)
Election	MEP (Party)	MEP (Party)	MEP (Party)	MEP (Party)	MEP (Party)	MEP (Party)	MEP (Party)	MEP (Party)	MEP (Party)	MEP (Party)	MEP (Party)	MEP (Party)
1979	André Damseaux (PRL)	Jean Rey (PRL)	Fernand Delmotte (PS)	Ernest Glinne (PS)	Anne-Marie Lizin (PS)	Lucien Radoux (PS)	Paul-Henry Gendebien (DéFI)	Antoinette Spaak (DéFI)	Fernand Herman (CSP)	Charles-Ferdinand Nothomb (CSP)	Stephen Harcourt (CSP)	11 seats
1984	Luc Beyer de Ryke (PRL)	Daniel Ducarme (PRL)	Raymonde Dury (PS)	Ernest Glinne (PS)	Anne-Marie Lizin (PS)	José Happart (PS)	Marcel Remacle (PS)	François Roelants du Vivier (Ecolo)	Fernand Herman (CSP)	Anne-Marie Lizin (CSP)	Michel Toussaint (PRL)	11 seats
1989	François-Xavier de Donnea (PRL)	Jean Defraigne (PRL)	Raymonde Dury (PS)	Ernest Glinne (PS)	Anne-Marie Lizin (PS)	José Happart (PS)	Claude Delcroix (PS)	Paul Lannoye (Ecolo)	Fernand Herman (CSP)	Gérard Deprez (CSP)	Elio Di Rupo (PS)	Brigitte Ernst de la Graete (Ecolo)
1991	Anne André-Léonard (PRL)	Jean Defraigne (PRL)	Raymonde Dury (PS)	Ernest Glinne (PS)	Anne-Marie Lizin (PS)	José Happart (PS)	Claude Delcroix (PS)	Paul Lannoye (Ecolo)	Fernand Herman (CSP)	Gérard Deprez (CSP)	Elio Di Rupo (PS)	Brigitte Ernst de la Graete (Ecolo)
1994	Anne André-Léonard (PRL)	Philippe Monfils (PRL)	Raymonde Dury (PS)	Claude Desama (PS)	Antoinette Spaak (DéFI)	José Happart (PS)	Daniel Féret (FN)	Paul Lannoye (Ecolo)	Fernand Herman (CSP)	Gérard Deprez (CSP)	10 seats	
1998	Anne André-Léonard (PRL)	Philippe Monfils (PRL)	Claude Delcroix (PS)	Claude Desama (PS)	Antoinette Spaak (DéFI)	José Happart (PS)	Daniel Féret (FN)	Paul Lannoye (Ecolo)	Fernand Herman (CSP)	Gérard Deprez (CSP)	10 seats	
1999	Daniel Ducarme (PRL)	Frédérique Ries (PRL)	Jean-Maurice Dehousse (PS)	Claude Desama (PS)	Brigitte Ernst de la Graete (Ecolo)	Freddy Thielemans (PS)	Pierre Jonckheer (Ecolo)	Paul Lannoye (Ecolo)	Gérard Deprez (MCC)	Michel Hansenne (CSP)	10 seats	
2001	Daniel Ducarme (PRL)	Frédérique Ries (PRL)	Jean-Maurice Dehousse (PS)	Olga Zrihen (PS)	Brigitte Ernst de la Graete (Ecolo)	Véronique De Keyser (PS)	Pierre Jonckheer (Ecolo)	Paul Lannoye (Ecolo)	Gérard Deprez (MCC)	Michel Hansenne (CSP)	10 seats	
2003	Anne André-Léonard (PRL)	Frédérique Ries (PRL)	Jean-Maurice Dehousse (PS)	Olga Zrihen (PS)	Brigitte Ernst de la Graete (Ecolo)	Véronique De Keyser (PS)	Pierre Jonckheer (Ecolo)	Paul Lannoye (Ecolo)	Gérard Deprez (MCC)	Michel Hansenne (CSP)	10 seats	
2004	Anne André-Léonard (PRL)	Jacqueline Rousseaux (PRL)	Jean-Maurice Dehousse (PS)	Olga Zrihen (PS)	Brigitte Ernst de la Graete (Ecolo)	Véronique De Keyser (PS)	Pierre Jonckheer (Ecolo)	Paul Lannoye (Ecolo)	Gérard Deprez (MCC)	Michel Hansenne (CSP)	10 seats	
2004	Frédérique Ries (MR)	Gérard Deprez (MR)	Philippe Busquin (PS)	Marc Tarabella (PS)	Alain Hutchinson (PS)	Véronique De Keyser (PS)	Pierre Jonckheer (Ecolo)	Raymond Langendries (CDH)	Antoine Duquesne (MR)	9 seats		
2007	Frédérique Ries (MR)	Gérard Deprez (MR)	Philippe Busquin (PS)	Giovanna Corda (PS)	Alain Hutchinson (PS)	Véronique De Keyser (PS)	Pierre Jonckheer (Ecolo)	Raymond Langendries (CDH)	Antoine Duquesne (MR)	9 seats		
2009	Frédérique Ries (MR)	Louis Michel (MR)	Frédéric Daerden (PS)	Marc Tarabella (PS)	Philippe Lamberts (Ecolo)	Véronique De Keyser (PS)	Isabelle Durant (Ecolo)	Anne Delvaux (CDH)	8 seats			
2014	Frédérique Ries (MR)	Louis Michel (MR)	Marie Arena (PS)	Marc Tarabella (PS)	Philippe Lamberts (Ecolo)	Hugues Bayet (PS)	Gérard Deprez (MR)	Claude Rolin (CDH)	8 seats			
2019	Frédérique Ries (MR)	Olivier Chastel (MR)	Marie Arena (PS)	Marc Tarabella (PS)	Philippe Lamberts (Ecolo)	Saskia Bricmont (Ecolo)	Marc Botenga (PTB)	Benoît Lutgen (CDH)	8 seats			
2024	Sophie Wilmès (MR)	Olivier Chastel (MR)	Elio Di Rupo (PS)	Estelle Ceulemans (PS)	Benoît Cassartt (MR)	Saskia Bricmont (Ecolo)	Marc Botenga (PTB)	Yvan Verougstraete (LE)	8 seats			

== Election results ==
=== 2024 ===
Party	EU party	EP group	Votes	%	Change	Seats	Change
Reformist Movement	ALDE	RE	900,413	34.88	+15.59	3	+1
Socialist Party	PES	S&D	529,697	20.52	-6.17	2	-
Workers' Party of Belgium	ELA	Left	397,055	15.38	+1.21	1	-
Les Engagés	ALDE	RE	368,338	14.28	new	1	-
Ecolo	EGP	G-EFA	259,745	10.06	-9.85	1	-1
DéFl	NI	NI	75,243	2.91	-2.99	0	-
Anticapitalist Left	NI	NI	50,758	1.97	new	0	-

=== 2019 ===
Party	Affiliation	Votes	%	Change	Seats	Change
Socialist Party (PS)	PES	651,157	26.69	▼2.60	2	▼1
Ecolo	EGP	485,655	19.91	▲8.22	2	▲1
Reformist Movement (MR)	ELDR	470,654	19.29	▼7.81	2	▼1
Workers' Party of Belgium (PTB)	None	355,883	14.59	▲9.11	1	▲1
Humanist Democratic Centre (CDH)	EPP	218,078	8.94	▼2.42	1	Steady
DéFI	None	144,555	5.92	▲2.54	0	Steady
People's Party (PP)	None	113,793	4.66	▼1.32	0	Steady
Total		2,439,775	100	–	8	Steady

=== 2014 ===
Party	Affiliation	Votes	%	Change	Seats	Change
Socialist Party (PS)	PES	714,645	29.29	▲0.19	3	Steady
Reformist Movement (MR)	ELDR	661,332	27.10	▲1.05	3	▲1
Ecolo	EGP	285,196	11.69	▼11.19	1	▼1
Humanist Democratic Centre (CDH)	EPP	277,246	11.36	▼1.98	1	Steady
People's Party (PP)	ADDE	145,909	5.98	▲5.98	0	Steady
Workers' Party of Belgium (PTB)	None	133,811	5.48	▲4.32	0	Steady
Francophone Democratic Federalists (FDF)	None	82,540	3.38	▲3.38	0	Steady
Debout Les Belges! (DLB!)	None	72,671	2.98	▲2.98	0	Steady
La Droite	None	38,813	1.59	▲1.59	0	Steady
Vega	None	15,208	0.62	▲0.62	0	Steady
Stand Up USE	None	7,970	0.33	▲0.33	0	Steady
MG	None	4,705	0.19	▲0.19	0	Steady
Total		2,440,046	100	–	8	Steady

=== 2009 ===
Party	Affiliation	Votes	%	Change	Seats	Change
Socialist Party (PS)	PES	714,947	29.10	▼6.99	3	▼1
Reformist Movement (MR)	ELDR	640,092	26.05	▼1.53	2	▼1
Ecolo	EGP	562,081	22.88	▲13.03	2	▲1
Humanist Democratic Centre (CDH)	EPP	327,824	13.34	▼1.80	1	0
National Front (FN)	None	87,706	3.57	▼3.88	0	0
Workers' Party of Belgium+ (PTB)	None	28,483	1.16	▲0.35	0	0
Others		96,045	3.91	–	0	–
Total		2,457,178	100	–	8	▼1

=== 2004 ===
Party	Votes	%	Change	Seats	
Socialist Party (PS)	878,577	36.09	+10.31	4	+1
Reformist Movement (MR)	671,422	27.58	+0.59	3	0
Democratic Humanist Centre (CDH)	368,753	15.15	+1.84	1	+1
Ecologists (Ecolo)	239,687	9.84	−12.86	1	−2
National Front (FN)	181,351	7.45	+3.35	0	0
New Belgian Front (FNB)	26,775	1.1	+0.03	0	0
Rassemblement Wallonie-France (RWF)	23,090	0.95	N/A	0	
CDF	19,718	0.81	N/A	0	
Workers' Party of Belgium (PTB+)	19,645	0.81	N/A	0	
Movement for a Socialist Alternative (MAS)	5,675	0.23	N/A	0	
Total	2,434,693			9	
