= Alain Hutchinson =

Belgian politician

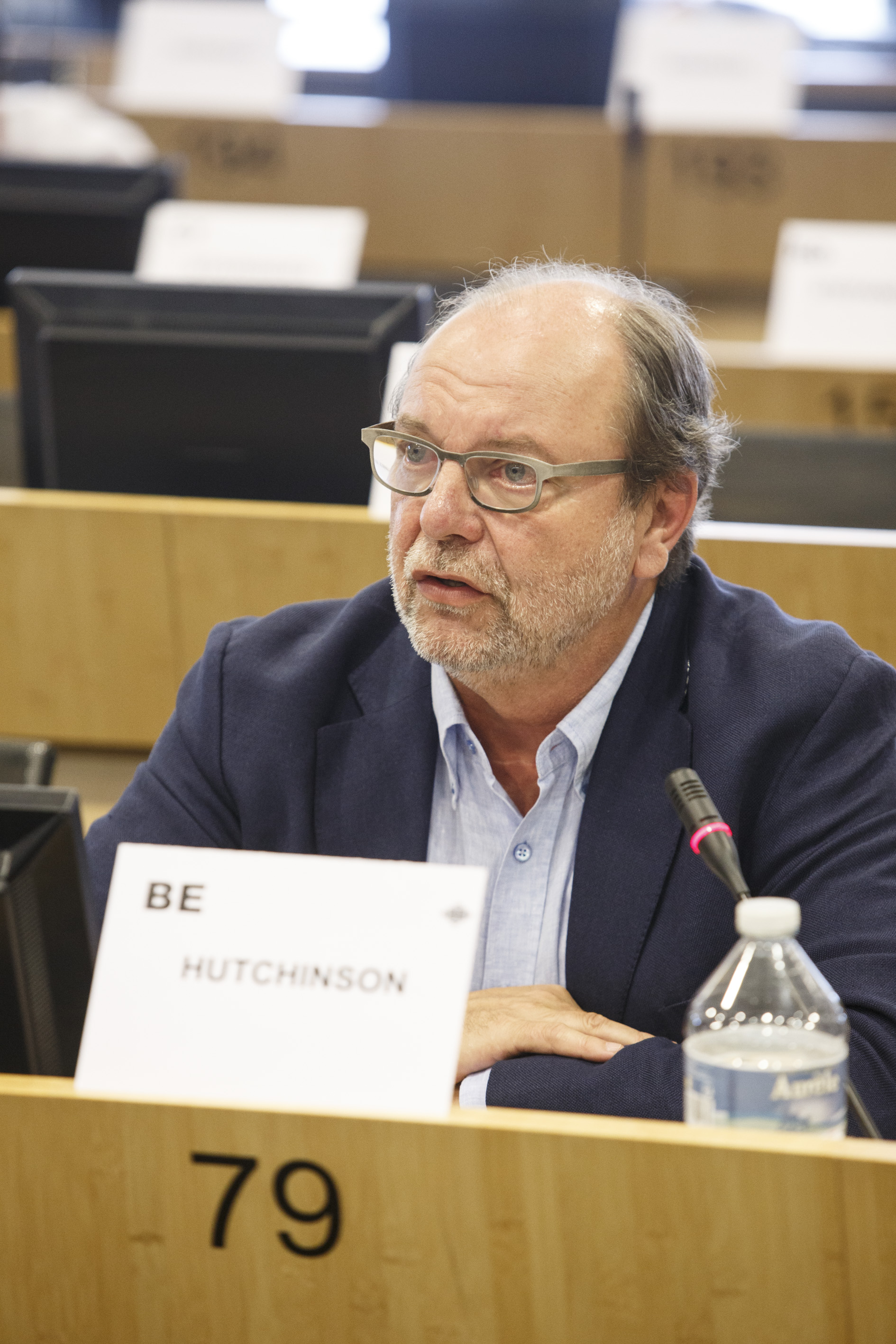
- Alain Hutchinson, Municipal Councillor of Saint-Gilles, Belgium, 2015,
- Born: 10 December 1949 (age 76); Schaerbeek, Belgium
- Occupation: Politician

Alain Hutchinson (born 10 December 1949) is a Belgian politician and Member of the European Parliament for the French Community of Belgium with the Parti Socialiste, part of the Socialist Group and sits on the European Parliament's Committee on Development where he is Coordinator for the Socialist group.

He is a substitute for the Subcommittee on Human Rights and a vice-chair of the Delegation for relations with the Maghreb countries and the Arab Maghreb Union (including Libya).

== Education ==
- 1970: Social worker

== Career ==
- 1972-1987: Secretary of the FGTB employees' union
- 1988-1989: Head of the office of the Minister for Social Welfare and Health, French-Speaking Community of Belgium
- 1989-1999: Head of the office of the Premier of the Brussels-Capital Region
- 1988-1999: Deputy Mayor for education and culture, Saint-Gilles
- 1999-2004: State Secretary for housing and energy, Brussels-Capital Region
- Minister for the Budget and Social Welfare, French Community Commission

== Decorations ==
- Knight of the Order of the Crown (Belgium)
- Commander of the Order of Leopold II

== See also ==
- 2004 European Parliament election in Belgium
