= Dyab Abou Jahjah =

Arab political activist and writer (born 1971)

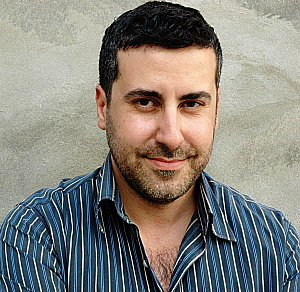
Dyab Abou Jahjah in 2008.

Dyab Abou Jahjah (Arabic: دياب أبو جهجه, romanized: Diyāb Abū Jahjah; born 24 June 1971) is a Lebanese political activist and writer. He is the co-founder of Hind Rajab Foundation and its parent organization, the March 30 Movement, as well as the former leader of the Arab European League (AEL), a Pan-Arabist movement that supports the interests of Muslim immigrants in Europe.

== Personal life ==
Abou Jahjah was born and grew up in southern Lebanon in Hanin, near the border with Israel. He said that he had joined Hezbollah in its campaign against Israel and had some military training. He gained refugee status in 1996 and became a Belgian citizen through marriage to a Belgian woman, from whom he much later divorced. He is now married to a Belgian Muslim woman, Nabila Boujdaine of Moroccan origin, who was also on the electoral lists for his MDP party in 2004. N. Boujdaine is the sister of Saida from the book Saida, written by De Standaard journalist, Tom Naegels and is a partner in a new organisation, Safe Have Aid, established by Dyab Abou Jahjah and his brother.

Abou Jahjah has written several books, among them an autobiography titled Between Two Worlds: The Roots of a Freedom Struggle. He was also the subject of two political biographies, one written by Mohammed Benzakour and the other by Maroun Labaki, and a political analysis book written by the Belgian communist writer Ludo De Witte.

In 1991, at the age of 19, Abou Jahjah moved from Lebanon to Belgium. He studied at UCLouvain in Louvain-la-Neuve and obtained a master's degree in political science and International relations. After several odd jobs during his study time, including factory work and construction labour, he became the director of vzw Welkom, the immigrant working body for the ABVV trade union.

== Political views ==
Abou Jahjah is an Arab nationalist in the Nasserite tradition and considers socialism to be a core paradigm to his thinking as it is not based on race or skin color. He believes immigrants should be treated as full citizens, rather than being treated as guests, and has expressed admiration for the American model of assimilation, saying: "America's race laws are more advanced than here. I have relatives in Detroit and they are Arab-Americans but they feel American. I don't feel European. Europe needs to make its concept of citizenship inclusive to all cultures and religions."

The Guardian wrote that Abou Jahjah was called “Belgium’s Malcolm X." According to a Flemish newspaper, Abou Jahjah supported the use of violence against foreign troops in Iraq. In a blog post, Abou Jahjah stated that his views were misrepresented and that, "Every soldier taking part in an illegal occupation is a legitimate target for resistance. However, rejoicing the death of people, even enemy soldiers, is not something that I would do". After a Danish newspaper published negative portrayals of the prophet Muhammad, the Dutch arm of the AEL published a comic casting doubt on the Holocaust in 2010, for which it was fined. The organization said it was published to highlight a double standard regarding freedom of speech. After the president of the Board of Deputies of British Jews wrote a letter to then-home secretary Jacqui Smith in 2009, Abou Jahjah was banned from the UK. His political views and statements have sometimes been controversial. In 2015, Jeremy Corbyn was asked about his relationship with Abou Jahjah. Corbyn and Abou Jahjah had two meals together and spoke at the same anti-war meeting in 2009.

=== Arab European League ===
In 2000, Abou Jahjah founded the pan-Arabist and anti-Zionist Arab European League in Antwerp, a city with a large Muslim population. In the 2003 election, the Arab European League partnered with the Marxist-Leninist Workers' Party of Belgium to form the RESIST (electoral list), which failed to win any seats and soon dissolved. In 2004 he started the MDP, but this party didn't obtain any elected participants.

In 2001, Abou Jahjah founded the Sabra and Shatila committee, which brought a lawsuit against former Israeli prime minister Ariel Sharon for his role in the Sabra and Shatila massacre that was committed in adjacent refugee camps during the Lebanese Civil War in 1982.

== Career ==
=== 2006 Lebanon War ===
In July 2006, he announced that he would be going to Lebanon to help in whatever way he can defending his country against the attack by Israeli forces.

=== Popular culture ===
During the year of 2002, Abou Jahjah was the most mentioned name in the Belgian media, exceeding references to the prime minister and the king. He was played by the comedian Paul Groot in the Dutch comedy show Kopspijkers. He was also a main character in the best selling novel Los of writer Tom Naegels which was later filmed.

=== Debating skills ===
Roderiek van Grieken called Abou Jahjah a "perfect pure talent" in debating. The linguist C. Delantsheer wrote a chapter on Abou Jahjah's rhetoric in a book published by Cambridge university in 2007, as well as a paper on the power of Abou Jahjah's metaphors which was presented to an academical congress in Sweden.

=== Return to Belgium ===
In September 2013, Abou Jahjah returned to Belgium due to the dire security situation in Lebanon. He said that he would be founding a new movement, Movement-X, that will seek to defend equal rights and social justice.

In January 2017, De Standaard cancelled Abou Jahjah's column when, following the 2017 Jerusalem truck attack, he wrote that the "liberation of Palestine 'by any means necessary' needs to take place", citing newspaper policy.

=== Hind Rajab Foundation ===
In 2024, Abou Jahjah co-founded the March 30 Movement (a name referencing Land Day) and its legal arm, the Hind Rajab Foundation – named in honor of Hind Rajab – a group that aims to use "offensive litigation" to hold responsible those involved in "atrocities, including perpetrators, accomplices, and inciters of violence against Palestinians." In early 2025, following the announcement that a court in Brazil would be investigating an Israeli soldier (at the time, visiting the country) for war crimes, Abou Jahjah was threatened on X by Amichai Chikli, an Israeli government official. Chikli wrote "Hello, our human rights activist. Watch your pager", which Belgian media suggested was a reference to the 2024 Lebanon electronic device attacks.
