= Arab European League =

Arab European League Arabisch-Europese Liga رابطة الدول العربية الأوروبية
- Founder: Dyab Abou Jahjah
- Founded: 22 February 2000
- Dissolved: 26 November 2007
- Ideology: Arab nationalism Nasserism; Pan-Arabism; Pan-Islamism; Anti-Zionism; Anti-Americanism; Anti-LGBT; Antisemitism (denied); Sunni-Shia unity Muslim-Christian unity
- Political position: Catch-all

The Arab European League (Dutch: Arabisch-Europese Liga, AEL) was a Pan-Arabist political organisation active in Belgium and the Netherlands.

The Arab European League was dissolved by court order on November 26, 2007, and liquidated on December 20, 2010.

== Foundation ==
AEL was founded and is led by Dyab Abou Jahjah, a Lebanese-born Shi'a Muslim living in Belgium who emigrated from Lebanon in 1991 to begin university studies in Belgium. In July 2006, Abou Jahjah returned to Lebanon allegedly to join the battle of the 2006 Lebanon War on the side of Hezbollah against Israel.

== Activities ==
The AEL described itself as Nasserite, Pan-Arabist and anti-Zionist. The group expresses support for the actions of Islamist "resistance" against the occupation of Iraq and approves the killings of coalition soldiers.

Salon.com reported that the group issued public approvals for the September 11, 2001 attacks and the organization's rallies have been reported by The Christian Science Monitor to end in chanting "jihad" and "Osama bin Laden". However, the group's English-language website has been critical of Al-Qaeda, referring to the September 11 attacks as "horrifying" and condemning al-Qaeda for alleged terrorist acts committed in Jordan.

Following the murder of a 27-year-old Belgian of North African descent by an allegedly mentally ill native Belgian man in Antwerp in 2002, which led to racially influenced riots in the city, the Arab European League began patrolling the streets of Antwerp with video cameras to monitor police activity. The AEL claimed that Belgian police were engaging in a racist "manhunt" of the city's Moroccan youth and that many police officers sympathized with the far-right political party Vlaams Blok. The AEL patrols were stopped after the Antwerp public prosecutor's office began an investigation into whether the activities violated Belgian laws against the organization of private militias. The court however decided on 31 May 2006 that the patrols were not enough to prosecute the organization. Three leaders of the AEL however will be tried for their leading role in the unrest and riots after the 2002 murder.

The organization also responded to issues of concern to Muslims, as with its creation of a short film Al Mouftinoun in response to the film Fitna. (See International reaction to Fitna.)

== Electoral participations ==
Moslim Democratische Partij logo

The AEL strived to develop an Arab Muslim communalist movement in Europe. The group participated in the federal elections in Belgium in 2003 under the umbrella RESIST with the PVDA (Workers Party Belgium, a Maoist political party). The party gained 0.15% in the election of the Belgian Chamber of Representatives and 0.27% in the Dutch electoral college of the Belgian Senate. These electoral results were far too low to win a seat.

They also participated in the Flemish elections in 2004 under the denomination Moslim Democratische Partij (Muslim Democratic Party), reaching their highest share of votes (0.27%) in the province of Antwerp. This electoral result was far too low to gain a seat in the Flemish Parliament.

== Controversies ==
=== Antisemitism ===
Belgian prime minister Guy Verhofstadt blamed the group for agitating racist Arabism sentiments among Arabs and inciting violence during street riots in Antwerp in 2002 and criticized it for creating patrols to shadow policemen with video cameras to monitor for alleged acts of supposed "anti-Arab racism".

According to Center for Information and Documentation Israel (CIDI) a think tank established by the Jewish community in the Netherlands in 1974:

In April 2002 the Antwerp-based Arab European League (AEL) leader Dyab Abou Jahjah (1971) performed for the first time at a pro-Palestine demonstration in Antwerp that got completely out of hand, "Where flags of Israel were set on fire and demonstrators shouted anti-Semitic chant" (De Volkskrant, 11/5/02). "Jews are dogs," was heard in the streets (Reformatorisch Dagblad, March 1, 2003).

In June 2002, the Centre for Equal Opportunities and Opposition to Racism lodged a complaint against the Arab European League for infringing the anti-racist law.

A demonstration took place the same month co-organized with the Flemish Green party and NGO's such as 11.11.11 and Kif Kif, during which a puppet representing an orthodox Jew was burned publicly.

According to a 2005 US State Department report, in Europe:

Anti-Semitism, particularly among Muslims, was linked in many cases to the ongoing conflict between Israel and the Palestinians. Most anti-Semitic incidents were not violent and included abusive language, hate mail, verbal insults at soccer matches, Internet "chat room" discussions, as well as persistent historical revisionism (such as Holocaust denial). However, pockets of militant young Muslims, mostly Moroccan Arabs, on a number of occasions assaulted or intimidated identifiable Jews. In addition to the anti-Semitic acts carried out by a relatively small group of Arab youths, the virulent anti-Israel sentiment among certain groups in society, such as the Arab European League (AEL) and the Stop the Occupation movement, also have contributed to an anti-Semitic atmosphere in some quarters.

In 2005, Arab European League's president Dyab Abou Jahjah supported and rationalized Mahmoud Ahmadinejad's statements—after The Islamic Republic's head made his controversial speeches including the infamous (widely denounced) genocidal call for Israel to be wiped off—writing:

(…) the foundation of Mr. Ahmadinejad's reasoning is intellectually defendable, and despite the fact that his regime is no perfect example of political morality, I argue that his position on this matter is the only possible moral one.

And adding:

It is not the Jewish people that should be wiped out, and it is not the buildings and the houses and the schools that the settlers built, but it is the institutional frame that is represented by that Zionist entity "Israel" and its founding Ideology: Zionism. Wiping out Zionism from Palestine and establishing one Palestinian democratic state on all the territories of historical Palestine is the only solution that will guarantee peace for all, in equality. It is the only way to build a future together and to turn the bloody page that was opened when Zionism was introduced by western colonialism into the heart of the Arab nation. And, above all, it is the only position any democrat can have if he is to be consistent with himself. Just like abolishing the racist and segregationist South Africa was the only acceptable position. Saying that Zionism and the state built by it and with it as leitmotiv should be wiped out from the map is, regardless of the nuances, the only morally defendable position.

In February 2006, AEL posted antisemitic cartoons on its website. In late September 2005, the Danish newspaper Jyllands-Posten published several controversial Muhammad cartoons in which the Islamic prophet Muhammad was associated with terrorism. After Belgian and Dutch newspapers republished the cartoons and politicians defended the publication with the argument of free speech, both denouncing the protests of Muslims and the AEL, the AEL issued statements and posted cartoons on the subject of Holocaust denial on its web pages using the same argument of "free speech" and denouncing official protests against them in return. The cartoons were called antisemitic and negationist by De Standaard, a Belgian newspaper. A Dutch pro-Israel organization "Center for Information and Documentation Israel" (CIDI) filed a formal complaint in Amsterdam against the AEL following the publication of the cartoons.

In January 2009, the AEL was reported to be the driving force behind Anti-Jewish violence during anti-Israel protests in Antwerp.

On August 19, 2010, shortly before its liquidation, the organisation was fined by a Dutch appeals court 2,500 euros ($3,200) for publishing a cartoon which suggested the Holocaust was made up or exaggerated by Jews.

=== Homophobia ===
Salon.com states that an AEL official called for the death penalty for homosexuals prior to assuming a leadership position within the group. In 2003, the political party Agalev (currently known as Groen!) attempted to place posters in Antwerp of gay and lesbian couples kissing while dressed in Islamic attire. The AEL considered it blasphemous and as an insult to Islam because according to them, the Qur'an explicitly forbids homosexuality.

== Dissolution ==
The Arab European League was officially dissolved by court order on November 26, 2007, with the liquidation process completed on December 20, 2010.

== See also ==
- Arabs in Europe
  - Arabs in the Netherlands
- Antisemitism in Islam
