= International reactions to Fitna =

Reactions to a movie by a Dutch politician

The international reaction to Fitna consisted of condemnation from Muslims, several fatwa against Geert Wilders, and attempts by many Islamic countries to censor the film. The Dutch government immediately distanced itself from the film. Several Muslim organizations and political parties organized boycotts against Dutch products.

== Prior to the release ==
It was feared that the film would lead to violent demonstrations by Muslims much like the organized protests against the Jyllands-Posten Muhammad cartoons that were published in the Danish newspaper Jyllands-Posten in 2005. The Dutch counter-terrorism agency raised its terror risk level from "limited" to "substantial", noting Islamist death threats against Wilders and calls to attack Dutch troops. Previous violence included the burning of the Danish embassy in Syria and other acts of violence around the world, including the murder of a Catholic nun.

=== In the Netherlands ===
The movie was first mentioned in the Dutch media on November 27, 2007. The Dutch government almost immediately expressed great concern about the film release. It made evacuation plans available to all its consulates and embassies worldwide and tightened security measures around military installations abroad.

The Prime minister of the Netherlands, Jan Peter Balkenende, worried about possible repercussions for Dutch citizens and economic interests. In response Wilders accused Balkenende of capitulating to Islam.

Wilders had been warned by Dutch National Counterterrorism Co-ordinator Tjibbe Joustra that his film may "lead to reactions that endanger public order, security and the economy". The publication of the film was investigated by the Dutch Ministry of Justice to find out whether the release of the film could be prevented, but this could not be done. In an opinion poll, 54% of Dutch people still believed that the film should be released, despite any possible negative effects.

On March 6, 2008, the Dutch government raised its national risk level of a terrorist attack from the status 'limited' to 'substantial' because of concerns that Muslim terrorists would launch attacks against European targets, using the film as justification.

A demonstration against the release of the film occurred in Dam Square, in Amsterdam, on 22 March 2008. In response to concerns, Dutch broadcaster Radio Netherlands Worldwide created a multi-language website to detail the film, the surrounding controversy, its creator, and the nation of its origin. The Dutch newspaper De Pers printed a reconstruction of how the concerns came about and who was responsible for them.

A large advertisement was placed on the front page of de Volkskrant stating that if Wilders had said the things he has said about Muslims, about Jews, he would have been prosecuted for antisemitism. The advertisement was endorsed by the Jewish organisations Stichting de Initiavieven and Een Ander Joods Geluid.

=== Other reactions ===
On 7 April 2008, Indonesia blocked access to YouTube and a number of other websites, such as MySpace and Multiply. Minister of Menkon Info Muhammad Nuh passed a bill that forced 146 ISP's in Indonesia to block access to YouTube on Monday. Kompas confirmed that the reason for the block was YouTube's refusal to remove Fitna from their servers. The block has now been removed, and the foreign relation minister has apologised to the people for any inconvenience.

Also it banned the YouTube video in Malaysia due to its Islamic content and violent nature which cause the YouTube to be blocked and later lifted by 1 month.

The EU alerted its diplomatic missions around the world to expect a reaction to the release of the film.

NATO said it feared that the consequences of Fitna would affect the safety of troops in Afghanistan. Indeed, Zabihullah Mujahid stressed that the Taliban would increase their attacks on Dutch military and humanitarian peacekeepers in Afghanistan, if the film were released.

President Nicolas Sarkozy declared that France would provide the support to the Netherlands in the event of international problems.

Iran threatened to review its diplomatic stance with the Netherlands if the film was aired. Public protests occurred in Kabul, Afghanistan. Egypt said it was closely monitoring the situation.

In February 2008, Pakistan internally banned YouTube for several days due to a video clip one report claimed to be a trailer for Fitna; the ban was lifted a few days later. As a result of the block, Pakistan accidentally caused YouTube to be unavailable worldwide for two hours.

The Grand Mufti of Syria, Ahmad Badr al-Din, said that if Geert Wilders showed the image of a burning Qur'an in his film, the Dutch people will be held responsible and possible attacks against Western public interests would not be not out of the question.

Wilders is the subject of a fatwa, associated with Al-Qaeda, calling upon Muslims to assassinate him in the name of Islam.

==== Network Solutions website suspension ====
On 5 March 2008, a preliminary version of the movie's official website, fitnathemovie.com, went online. The only page on the site consisted of a picture of the Qur'an accompanied by the text "Geert Wilders presents Fitna" and "Coming soon". On 22 March, the hosting provider of the website, Network Solutions, replaced the page with a message stating that the company “is investigating whether the site's content is in violation of the Network Solutions Acceptable Use Policy” and that “Network Solutions has received a number of complaints regarding this site that are under investigation.”

On March 24, Network Solutions issued a press release saying the company asked Wilders for a copy of the film to review to gauge compliance with the Acceptable Use Policy, and it was only after they received no response from Wilders that they suspended the website. Wilders responded saying he had other options available and that his film would be made public before 1 April. The shutdown was followed by extensive criticism of Network Solutions' alleged hypocrisy in hosting the domain of Hezbollah, an entity that the United States and the Netherlands (along with four other countries) designate as a terrorist organization. On March 26, Network Solutions shut down the hizbollah.org domain as well.

== After the release ==
The reaction was mild in comparison with what was expected, with some Muslim delegates describing it as “not as jarring as anticipated”, saying they were “extremely relieved”. A worldwide violent reaction did not materialise, in stark contrast with threats made by Islamic leaders in the months before the release of the film. Death threats did occur against Wilders and the company that hosted the film.

=== In the Netherlands ===
In a televised reaction following the release, Jan Peter Balkenende, Prime Minister of the Netherlands, gave his reaction on behalf of the Dutch government.

Amongst other things, it stated:

The film equates Islam with violence. We reject this interpretation. The vast majority of Muslims reject extremism and violence. In fact, the victims are often also Muslims... ...We therefore regret that Mr Wilders has released this film. We believe it serves no purpose other than to cause offence.

Dutch parliamentarians of the largest political parties, Pieter van Geel (CDA), Mariëtte Hamer (PvdA) and Mark Rutte (VVD) stated that it was sad that the film did not present any solutions to current problems in the Dutch society - integration of Muslim immigrants and Muslim extremism - and invited Mr. Wilders to discuss possible solutions in the parliament. In a later parliamentary debate to discuss Balkenende's televised reaction, they expressed further opinions, calling the film 'cunningly made with evil intentions' (CDA), 'a message of fear beyond compare' (PvDA) and 'paranoid' (SP). Wilders was described as a 'political pyromaniac' (VVD) and a 'fearful man' (D66).

According to Der Spiegel, a speaker for the Muslim organization Contactorgaan Moslims en Overheid (CMO), Yusuf Altuntas, said that Wilders "is obviously looking to push the limits, but he resists crossing them." For instance, in the film a ripping sound overlaid with imagery of the Qur'an is said to be the ripping of a page from the phone book, and thunder sounds are replacing what might otherwise be perceived as bomb explosion sounds. The Arabic expert Leo Kwarten on the other hand said that "these subtleties may however be lost in the Arabic world."

The Centraal Joods Overleg (Central Jewish Committee) released a statement on March 28, 2008, condemning the film for reinforcing prejudices by implying that all Muslims are terrorists. The Committee said that the portrayal of Muslims in this manner was counterproductive, and that the Dutch Jewish community, along with the Dutch Muslim community and all of Dutch society, has a duty to combat all religious-based terrorism, and to protect everyone against those who wish to overthrow democracy or promote religious hatred.

Politician, and former Muslim, Ehsan Jami had intended to release an animated cartoon entitled The Life of Mohammed on April 20, 2008. The film, critical of Islam and Muhammad, was to depict Muhammad as a "sexual pervert" for the consummation of his marriage to Aisha when she was nine or ten years old at the time. In one clip, Muhammad is shown with an erection, taking the girl to a mosque adorned with a Nazi swastika, in preparation of her deflowering. Following calls from the Minister of Justice, Ernst Hirsch Ballin, to not increase tension in society, Jami decided against its release. He spoke of his fears that the Dutch police would be unable to adequately protect his safety, and of the possibility of a fatwa calling for his death being issued by Iran.

The Dutch Islamic Federation petitioned a judge for a judgement on Geert Wilders on allegations of hate speech law violations. Wilders was found not guilty of spreading hate.

In November 2008, a pamphlet that was distributed to children aged 10–12 years compared Fitna to Mein Kampf, stating that "Geert Wilders’ film Fitna and Adolf Hitler's Mein Kampf are based upon one-sided points-of-view. Fortunately there are also other books and plays that -on the contrary- show respect for people with other ideas or faiths or that look different."

=== Africa ===
In Algeria, the Minister for Religious Affairs said that Fitna is "a recurrent expression of the fascism which is abhorred by all cultures", and the country's imams have been ordered to denounce the film.

In Egypt, Foreign minister referred to Wilders' film as "a humiliation" to Islam, calling it "nothing less than repugnant," and stating that "Egypt rejects any offence or denigration of Islam and its prophet."

President Omar al-Bashir of Sudan called on Muslims to "challenge those who insult" Muhammad, and asked for "a binding international charter" for the respect of religious beliefs. al-Bashir continued: ""The offenses against our Arab and Islamic nations under the banner of freedom of expression are derogatory and defamatory and go against all human values."

=== Asia ===
==== Central Asia ====
Murat Ali Jumanov, the Grand Mufti of Kyrgyzstan, denounced the film, saying that it defames Islam and the Quran. He urged Kyrgyzstan's Muslim population to counter the hostility of the film's release.

==== South Asia ====
The Ministry of Foreign Affairs of Bangladesh "condemned in the strongest terms" the release of Fitna. It said that "Islam is a faith of peace which preaches patience and understanding," and the film's "unwarranted and mindless release can have grave consequences."

In an editorial for the independent English-language Bangladeshi newspaper Weekly Blitz, under the editorship of Salah Choudhury, there were many opinions expressed in condemnation of the Muslim world's response: "The Muslim world that is vocal and vociferous in its demands for censorship in the West is going through a reenergized paroxysm of anger and hate," the newspaper said, and asked "is it realistic to mandate that 100% of the world's population must be pro-Koran and pro-Muslim?" The editorial stated that Fitna's relative artistic or philosophical worth is irrelevant, and that its release is an issue of individual rights, freedom of speech, critical thinking, and the West's cultural inheritance of 3,000 years of civilization. The editorial continued to question Muslim countries' censorship and restriction of free speech, satirically saying that "we should ask them firmly yet politely exactly how they so effectively censor the existing hate speech, the rampant anti-Semitic and anti-West propaganda that fill their media, Mosques, schools and universities on an hourly basis, every day, almost without exclusion." The newspaper noted the hypocrisy of how Islam interacts with other religions, saying that Islam has "such unrivaled respect and such unprejudiced consideration for Christianity, Judaism and the rest of the world's religious cultures and beliefs." It notes that anti-government, pro-democratic, and "moderate or revolutionary speech and actions within their societies" are censored, and that multiculturalism, freedom of religion, and "unqualified personal expression" is prohibited.

Pakistan called for a discussion of the film at the next Organisation of the Islamic Conference (OIC) summit. According to the APP, the country's official news agency, the Pakistani foreign minister Shah Mehmood Qureshi condemned Fitna as being anti-Islamic. He said that the film was part of a series of incitingly discriminatory actions against Islam, made by the Western media. Quereshi said that the Pakistani government, and its people, are highly sensitive towards such actions made in the name of freedom of expression. Outside the Karachi Press Club, an effigy of Wilders, and the Dutch flag, was burned in a protest.

In a speech to the United Nations Human Rights Council (UNHRC) on 1 April, the ambassador and permanent representative of Pakistan to the United Nations, Masood Khan, said that the film was a "blatant provocation," had "distorted the message of the Holy Qur'an," was xenophobic and religiously intolerant. He called for the UNHRC to do more than condemn or adopt resolutions. As such, a Pakistani-sponsored United Nations resolution calling for the monitoring of "abuse of the right of freedom of expression" was successfully passed. The measure was accepted after achieving the required number of votes from Islamic countries, while European countries and Canada abstained. On behalf of the OIC, Khan said that the resolution will require people to exercise their freedom of expression responsibly. This drew criticism from Reporters Without Borders, whose press statement read:

The growing influence of Organisation of the Islamic Conference member states within the Human Rights Council is disturbing. All of the council's decisions are nowadays determined by the interests of the Muslim countries or powerful states such as China or Russia that know how to surround themselves with allies.

The secretary-general of the OIC, Ekmeleddin İhsanoğlu, spoke of helping a co-ordinated strategy made by the Ummah, the diaspora of Muslims living in non-Muslim countries, to combat a campaign of defamaing Islam in the West. İhsanoğlu had previously condemned the film as "causing insult to the sentiments of more than 1.3 billion Muslims in the world," and that it was "a deliberate act of discrimination against Muslims" that would "threaten the security and stability of the world."

On 6 April 2008, five thousand members of the Jamaat-e-Islami political party held a demonstration in Karachi, in protest against both Wilders' film and the Jyllands-Posten Muhammad cartoons. The leader of the political party stated that "such shameful acts can never be tolerated in the name of freedom of expression or press," and asserted that anyone who committed a crime of provoking Muslims should be declared "terrorists".

On 3 May 2008, around 5000 Muslims gathered in Karachi, Pakistan in a protest against Wilder's film, chanting "Death to the blasphemer" and burned an effigy of Wilders. In Afghanistan, the Taliban murdered two Dutch soldiers in retaliation for the film.

==== Southeast Asia ====
President Susilo Bambang Yudhoyono of Indonesia banned Wilders from entering the country, and prohibited the film from being broadcast. About 50 members of a hardline Muslim group demonstrated at the Dutch embassy in the Indonesian capital, Jakarta, throwing eggs and water bottles to the embassy compound. Protesters held signs saying "Death Sentence for Humiliating Islam", amid images of guns aimed at his head, and "Kill Geert Wilders". Indonesia blocked access to YouTube, after its demand that copies of the film be removed from YouTube servers was not implemented. The ban was lifted on April 11, following protests and allegations of censorship from users, with Indonesian communications minister Muhammad Nuh apologising for “the inconvenience caused”. Internet Service Providers said that they would instead try to block access to individual pages carrying Fitna.

On April 2, a Dutch consulate in the Indonesian city of Medan was the scene of a student protest. The Dutch national flag was torn from its pillar and burned, and about 50 students broke through the consulate gates.

In a letter to the state-owned Indonesian news agency Antara, Dutch ambassador Nikolaos van Dam said how Dutch society is one of peaceful co-existence, with respect for the law, which guarantees safety and freedom of speech and freedom of religion. He said that Holland has a tradition of respect, tolerance and responsibility, and that offending others is not part of that tradition; he called for everyone else to act in a similar spirit. Van Dam also expressed his government's desire to remain in open contact with everyone who wishes peaceful dialogue, to build a society "more firmly grounded in mutual understanding and respect."

Ahmad Zahid Hamidi, a member of the Cabinet of Malaysia government, urged Muslim intellectuals and youths to "take advantage of their resourcefulness and skills which they had used against the establishment, this time to defend Islam" through the internet; a reference to when hackers defaced a governmental webpage in protest of a proposed ban on pornography. The Pan-Malaysian Islamic Party, an opposition policial party, delivered a letter to the Dutch embassy warning that the film would "invite vengeance", and, along with former president Mahathir Mohamad, called for a worldwide Muslim boycott of Dutch goods. Mahathir said: "If the world's 1.3 billion Muslims unite and say they won't buy, then it [the boycott] will be effective." The Muslim Consumers Association of Malaysia, the Consultative Council, and the Muslim Restaurants Association of Malaysia released a joint statement referring to Fitna as having insulted the Koran, and called on Muslims to boycott Dutch goods. Malay supermarket Mydin has marked Dutch goods in red, indicating their country of origin.

There was a demonstration outside the Dutch embassy in Kuala Lumpur on 4 April 2008, attended by approximately fifty members of the Pan-Malaysian Islamic Party. Slogans such as "Long live Islam" and "Crush the Netherlands" were shouted. A leader of the political party said: "He wants to insult Islam, insult our prophet, insult our Quran," and called for a fatwa ordering Wilders' death. The Dutch ambassador's response was: "The call for the death of Mr Wilders is a very emotional one, which in no way can be justified."

Singapore issued a statement strongly condemning the film, with deputy prime minister Wong Kan Seng saying: "Freedom of expression does not give anyone the licence to insult another's religion or race."

==== West Asia ====
The Bahrain News Agency, the government-operated news agency for Bahrain, released a statement regarding the film. Through the Supreme Council for Islamic Affairs, the government referred to Wilders as slanderous, and that Fitna was part of "the escalating hostility and unjust war waged from time to time against Islam." The Supreme Council called for "peaceful protests that reflect the civilized aspect of Islam," and recommended dialogue with the West to "spread the true tenets of Islam and shed light on the life and precepts of prophet Mohammed." The Supreme Council also called for Islamic countries and the Organisation of the Islamic Conference to push for a United Nations resolution to criminalise blasphemy against Islam, "for the sake of global peace and harmony".

Mohammad Ali Hosseini, a spokesman for Iran's ministry of foreign affairs said Fitna was "heinous", blasphemous, and that its release "is indicative of the continuation of the evilness and deep vengeance such Western nationals have against Islam and Muslims." Iran's government spokesperson, Gholam-Hossein Elham, said that "The new wave of the fight against Islam and promoting Islamophobia, which was started by the U.S., has so far opposite effects in the world of Islam as well as other parts of the globe." Elham stated that the governments 'of the countries where the anti-Islamic moves have been made' would, in future, prevent any further actions against Islam, saying that 'insults against the holy prophet of Islam and the divine religion were against the principles of freedom of expression'. In Tehran, approximately seventy members of the paramilitary force Basij protested outside the Dutch embassy. They chanted slogans such as "Down with USA", "Down with Israel", "Dutch Ambassador to Iran Should Be Expelled", and called for the closure of Royal Dutch Shell and Philips. A spokesperson for the protesters said that the release of the film was a ploy by imperialists to harm Muslim countries, insult Muhammad, and stage a Crusade, adding: "We will never remain silent in the face of ploys by domestic or foreign enemies. During a sermon on 4 April, broadcast on Iranian state radio, Ayatollah Ahmad Khatami accused the "Zionist entity" of Fitna's making and release. He said: "Behind these satanic acts can be found the oppressive powers and the Zionist regime." Of Wilders, Khatami said: "This poor Dutch deputy has made 40 trips to Israel over the past 25 years." Khatami concluded that "we see the hand of the Zionist regime behind these satanic acts and we cry 'death to Israel'." He stated that Fitna and the Jyllands-Posten Muhammad cartoons were a reaction against the "blossoming of Islam," and that "these films and caricatures are disseminated under the pretext of freedom of information in Europe. This is a great lie of Western liberal democracy, because anyone who speaks out against the official version of the Holocaust is jailed," referring to Holocaust denial. Khatami spoke of a Europe actively engaged in defaming Islam, saying that "there is a catchy disease spreading in Europe today, whose victims feel obliged to insult Islam and to fight against the Muslims," mentioning the conversion of Magdi Allam from Islam to Catholicism as further proof of his statements. He claimed that European "plans" that had been "devised for hundreds of years have borne absolutely no fruit, which is the reason why they have begun conducting such wretched moves." Khatami said that "such moves are made in Europe under the cover of freedom of expression prove that such a freedom does not exist there, since as soon as an intellectual begins talking about the Holocaust, they put him to trial, condemn his move, and imprison him." He claimed that Islam in the Netherlands is increasing, saying that "the Dutch have also bought a large number of electronic versions of Qur'an in their own language and a large number of people in Holland have openly announced they have converted to Islam."

53 parliamentarians of Jordan have signed a petition, calling on Prime Minister Nader Dahabi to expel the Dutch ambassador and sever all diplomatic ties with Holland. Jordan also summoned Wilders to court, as Fitna was deemed to incite hatred.

The Dutch ambassador of Qatar said that: "In Holland, we have full freedom of expression. There is absolutely no censorship. People are expected to behave responsibly and those who cross the limits will be accountable for their actions."

The Saudi Arabian embassy in The Hague called the film provocative and "full of errors", that could ultimately lead to hatred of Muslims.

The Directorate of Religious Affairs in Turkey condemned the film as being 'incompatible with freedom of speech and thought', saying that it "aimed to portray Muslims as potential terrorists and to gradually exclude them from the international community." The Directorate said that "Islam is unfortunately face-to-face with a new 'fitna' due to the film, which promotes discrimination, hatred and violence." It continued to say that the film's objective was to create worldwide prejudice against Islam, and that "it is a serious indication of irresponsibility that in the film negative implications are directed at Muslim religious scholars, who never refrain from sharing their knowledge on religion with the Dutch government." The Directorate said that followers of other religions also did not accept the notion that terrorism is associated with Muslims, and that "this is an auspicious development for restoring peace among different cultures in the world."

United Arab Emirates Foreign minister, Abdullah Bin Zayed Al Nahyan, condemned the film as being critical and insulting to Muhammad.

The Yemeni parliament condemned the film, calling it inflammatory, discriminatory towards Muslims, and promoting religious violence and hatred, whilst stressing the need to respect all religions, cultures, and civilizations without prejudice.

=== Europe ===
In Denmark, Kurt Westergaard, the cartoonist from one of the Jyllands-Posten cartoons of Muhammed, has expressed concerns because his cartoon is used in the film without his permission, a violation of copyright. The Danish Union of Journalists has said it will file a lawsuit on Westergaard's behalf as he is still in hiding from the death threats against him. Westergaard says his cartoon was aimed against Islamic terrorists, not against Muslims. Similarly Dutch director Rob Muntz announced to file a lawsuit because of the uncredited use of his interview with Theo van Gogh. Westergaard drew a new cartoon showing Geert Wilders with a bomb on his head and a sign saying "Danger! Freedom of expression".

The Norwegian government (Labour Party) sharply distanced itself from the movie. Secretary of state Raymond Johansen from the Norwegian Foreign Ministry said in a statement to the newspaper Dagsavisen that "Wilders attempts to promote a content which contributes to hatred and suspicion. I profoundly disagree with the content, and I sharply distance myself from it." Per-Willy Amundsen, Spokesperson on Immigration Issues of the opposition Progress Party, however found the film largely correct, and challenged Johansen to present what that was false about it.

United Kingdom: Foreign Minister David Miliband announced his commitment to the “European values of freedom of speech” but said “in each of our countries” there are legal checks to ensure speech could not incite religious or racial hatred.

=== Oceania ===
Australian Minister for foreign affairs, Stephen Smith, "deplored" the film's release, saying that it is "an obvious attempt to generate discord between faith communities," and accused it of inciting racial hatred.

=== South America ===
Suriname: With 22% of its population being Muslim. Suriname has the highest Islamic population by percentage in the New World. The Surinamese agreement of Muslims launched a statement which said: "We regret the fact that the Dutch MP Geert wilders abuses feelings of fear and ignorance across the white Dutch population by insulting en bashing the Islam systematically....His latest provocation (the film Fitna) is an insult to the Islam and its 1,3 billion followers across the world".

=== International organizations ===
After the release of the film, a number of international organizations released statements or otherwise responded to the film. United Nations' Secretary-General Ban Ki-moon stated on March 28, 2008 that

I condemn, in the strongest terms, the airing of Geert Wilders’ offensively anti-Islamic film. There is no justification for hate speech or incitement to violence. The right of free expression is not at stake here. I acknowledge the efforts of the Government of the Netherlands to stop the broadcast of this film, and appeal for calm to those understandably offended by it. Freedom must always be accompanied by social responsibility.

In its statement, The Muslim World League said that Fitna's release was "[an] offensive act that aims to spread discord between people." The European Union's Slovenian president repudiated the film, commenting that it served “no other purpose than inflaming hatred”. The EU foreign ministers also condemned the film. “The film equates Islam with violence and this view is sharply rejected”, the ministers said in their statement, released after a meeting in Brdo, Slovenia. Europe's highest human rights authority, the Strasbourg based Council of Europe, called the film “a distasteful manipulation which exploits ignorance, prejudice and fear”.

Lengthier responses were released by the Arab European League and the Union of NGOs of the Islamic World.

==== Union of NGOs of the Islamic World ====
The Union of NGOs of the Islamic World (UNIW) issued a press release, stating that the film "heavily included insults to the Holy Qur’an and to the Islamic values." The UNIW said that distribution of such Islamophobic material, as well as other forms of Islamophobia such as the theatrical interpretation of Salman Rushdie's novel, The Satanic Verses, and the Jyllands-Posten Muhammad cartoons, should be banned in Europe. It said that "humiliation of the values that are held in high esteem by people cannot be justified by the freedom of speech" or artistic expression. It stated that "freedom of speech and disseminating ideas do not amount to the right to insult," and that no-one's "sacred values" should be humiliated. It went on to call for European states to "not give permission to such publications, broadcasts and policies," and asked that they "take the necessary regulations that shall regard the Islamophobic acts and incidents as a crime." The UNIW likened Islamophobia to antisemitism and its legal status in Europe, saying that if Islamophobia and Islamophobic publications are not made illegal, "marginal extremist-racist groups that are after discrimination may be strengthened." It said that Islamophobia is an infringement of human rights, and "a perilous discrimination." It said:

The reason why Muslim public opinion have not overreacted to these aforementioned broadcasts, policies and events is that they have a common sense stemming from their belief. Nevertheless, it does not mean that they shall never react. It should be ensured that Muslim public opinion react to these all the Anti-Islamist broadcasts, policies and acts through peaceful means.

The UNIW called on Europe "to use their common sense and heed, and to revise their attitudes in order to build social peace."

==== Arab European League ====
The Arab European League released a short film, Al Mouftinoun, in response to Fitna. It was released March 28 on YouTube, one day after Fitna was released. Al Mouftinoun criticizes Fitna's director Wilders as a racist. The film was created by the AEL because they find that Muslims are being marginalised and discriminated against by Fitna.

On their website, the AEL claimed the following:

The announced movie of Wilders and the Danish cartoons are part of an agenda to provoke Muslims in Europe and around the world under the flag of freedom of expression. There can be no doubt about their intentions. Defending their statements with the right of expression is deceptive. There should be a debate on the content. The right-wing movement should not be underestimated. They represent a large part of European society. They are advocating for the eradication of equality as a constitutional law. And more often advocating for constriction of the rights of ethnic minorities. The right-wing movement in the Netherlands and in Europe in general is not compatible with its own "Western values."
