= Fernand Delmotte =

Belgian politician (1920–1998)

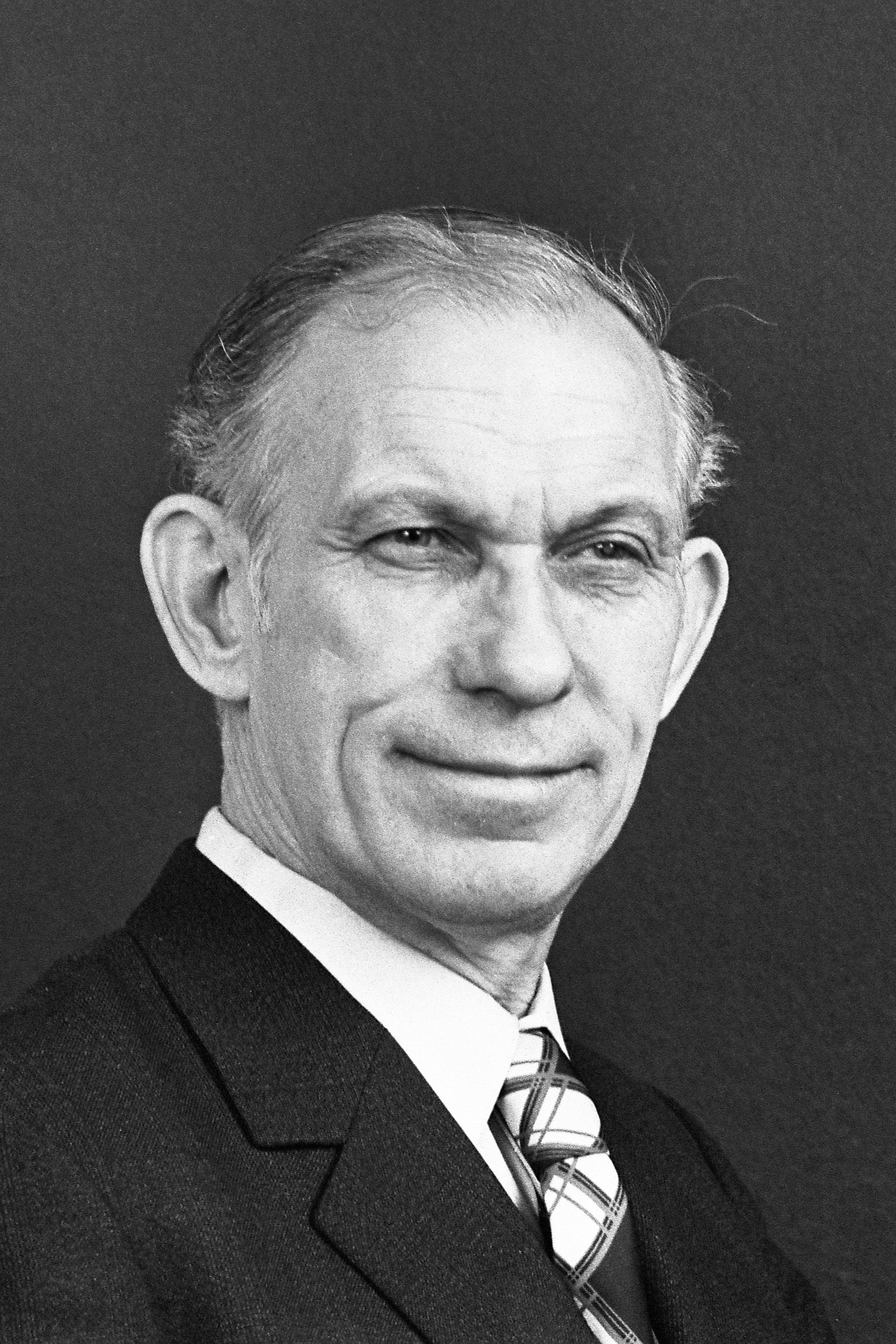

Member of the European Parliament
- In office 1979–1984

Personal details
- Born: 24 July 1920
- Died: 4 July 1998 (aged 77)
- Party: Socialist

Fernand L. Delmotte (24 July 1920 – 4 July 1998) was a Belgian veteran of the Battle of Belgium and a politician from the Socialist Party who was a Senator, Minister and Member of the European Parliament for the French-speaking electoral college from 1979 to 1984.

== See also ==
- List of members of the European Parliament for Belgium, 1979–1984
