= John David Lewis =

American academic

John David Lewis (March 17, 1955 – January 3, 2012) was a political scientist, historian and Objectivist scholar who held the post of visiting associate professor in the Philosophy, Politics and Economics Program at Duke University from 2008 to 2012, as well as Associate Professor of Business at the University of North Carolina at Chapel Hill. Lewis was also an Anthem Fellow for Objectivist Scholarship.

Lewis received his PhD in classical studies at Cambridge University in 2001, with the dissertation, Solon’s Polis as Kosmos: Intellectual, Moral and Political Integration in Archaic Athens. He taught at the University of London from 2000 to 2001. From 2001 to 2008, he was a professor in the History and Political Science Department at Ashland University, where contention surrounding his denial of promotion to tenured professor drew national attention. Lewis was a member of the American Political Science Association, the Association of Ancient Historians, the Society for Military History, the American Philological Association, and the Cambridge Philological Society. Lewis published three books, was a contributing editor to The Objective Standard and contributed to Capitalism Magazine and contributed to multiple publications including Journal of Business Ethics, Social Philosophy and Policy, Polis, Dike, and Bryn Mawr Classical Review. Lewis frequently spoke at Objectivist conferences and Tea Party events. He also spoke on the morality of free markets in medicine, arguing that innovators ought to be freed from unnecessary regulation. In 2008 Lewis held a presentation at the "Facing Jihad" conference in Jerusalem, a counter-jihad summit hosted by MK Aryeh Eldad that included a screening of the film Fitna by Geert Wilders.

Lewis died on January 3, 2012, after a long battle with cancer. He was 56.

== Books ==
- Nothing Less than Victory: Decisive Wars and the Lessons of History (Princeton University, March 2010)
- Solon the Thinker: Political Thought in Archaic Athens (Duckworth Press, 2006) (pb. edn. 2008)
- Early Greek Lawgivers (Bristol Classical Press, August 2007)
