= Anne André-Léonard =

Belgian politician

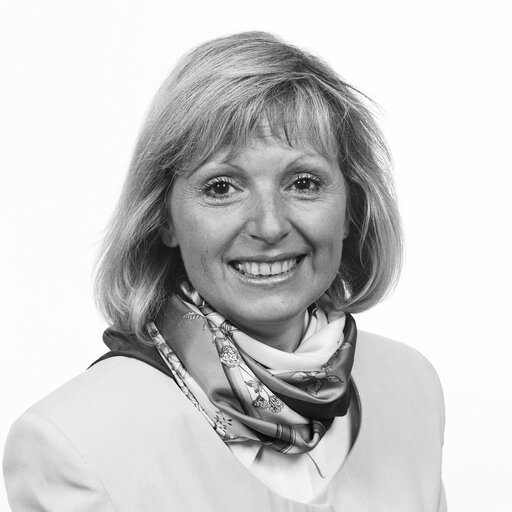
- Born: 16 November 1948 (age 77); Schaerbeek, Belgium
- Occupation: politician

Anne André-Léonard (born 16 November 1948) is a former Member of the European Parliament representing Belgium. She was a member of the Liberal Reformist Party and the Mouvement Réformateur. Originally a local alderman, André-Léonard was first elected a Member of the European Parliament in 1985, ending her European Parliamentary career in 2004 after three non-consecutive terms.

== Career ==
Anne André-Léonard was born on 16 November 1948 at Schaerbeek, Belgium. Her professional career began with the Ministry of Economic Affairs, although her entry into political life did not occur until 1976, when she became a member of the Municipal Council of Ottignies. Five years later, she was elected alderman. On 12 November 1985, André-Léonard became a Member of the European Parliament, representing Belgium as a member of the Liberal Reformist Party. She was not re-elected in 1989, instead opting to focus on municipal politics, serving as Deputy Mayor of Ottignies. In 1994, André-Léonard was again elected to the European Parliament, again as a member of the Liberal Reformist Party, ending her second term there on 19 July 1999.

In 1999, André-Léonard joined the federal government as the commissaire du gouvernement à la simplification administrative, or government commissioner for administrative simplification. From 2000 to 2006, she was a member of the provincial government of Walloon Brabant, and in 2003 she was elected a Member of the European Parliament for a third time, as a member of the Liberal Reformist Party and the Mouvement Réformateur. Her final European Parliament term ended the very next year, on 19 July 2004.

After leaving provincial politics, André-Léonard served as the Assistant Commissioner for Belgium at the World Expo in Zaragoza, a position she held from 2006 to 2008.
