= 2003 Belgian federal election =

- 18 May 2003
- Chamber of Representatives
- All 150 seats in the Chamber of Representatives; 76 seats needed for a majority
- Turnout: 91.63%
Party	Leader	Vote %	Seats	+/–
VLD	Guy Verhofstadt	15.36	25	+2
sp.a–spirit	Johan Vande Lanotte	14.91	23	+9
CD&V	Stefaan De Clerck	13.25	21	−1
PS	Elio Di Rupo	13.02	25	+6
Vlaams Blok	Frank Vanhecke	11.68	18	+3
MR	Antoine Duquesne	11.40	24	+6
cdH	Joëlle Milquet	5.47	8	−2
N-VA	Geert Bourgeois	3.06	1	New
Ecolo	Philippe Defeyt; Évelyne Huytebroeck; Marc Hordies	3.06	4	−7
FN	Daniel Féret	1.98	1	0
This lists parties that won seats. See the complete results below.
- Senate
- 40 of 71 seats in the Senate
Party	Vote %	Seats	+/–
sp.a–spirit	15.47	7	+3
VLD	15.38	7	+1
PS	12.84	6	+2
CD&V	12.71	6	0
MR	12.15	5	0
Vlaams Blok	11.32	5	+1
cdH	5.54	2	−1
Ecolo	3.19	1	−2
FN	2.25	1	+1
This lists parties that won seats. See the complete results below.

Federal Government before	Federal Government after election
Verhofstadt I Government	Verhofstadt II Government

Federal elections were held in Belgium on 18 May 2003, the first under a new electoral code. One of the novelties was an electoral threshold of 5, which has cost many seats to the N-VA and the Green parties, Ecolo and Agalev. The Belgian Socialists recovered well; the liberal and nationalist parties increased their vote as well.

The Flemish Greens lost all their seats. The Greens were attacked on two fronts: some, including their coalition partners, accused them of being too fundamentalist, while others said that they had betrayed their ideals. Although it was predicted in some opinion polls, the gains of the Front National were surprising, considering that it seldom appeared in the media. The most important trend was the recovery of the Flemish social-democrats, led by the popular (some would say populist) Steve Stevaert. The fact that Elio Di Rupo was learning Dutch caused rumours that he hoped to become prime minister, if the social-democrats would turn out to be the largest political family.

Themes that probably influenced the election results in some way were the government's opposition to the 2003 invasion of Iraq, the controversy around the nuisance around the airport of Zaventem, the controversy surrounding the banning of tobacco publicity, and unemployment, but a general dominating theme was lacking.

== Results ==
=== Chamber of Representatives ===
Party	Votes	%	+/–	Seats	+/–
Vlaamse Liberalen en Democraten	1,009,223	15.36	+1.06	25	+2
Socialistische Partij Anders–Spirit	979,750	14.91	+5.37	23	+9
Christen-Democratisch en Vlaams	870,749	13.25	–0.84	21	–1
Parti Socialiste	855,992	13.02	+2.86	25	+6
Vlaams Blok	767,605	11.68	+1.72	18	+3
Mouvement Réformateur	748,952	11.40	+1.26	24	+6
Centre démocrate humaniste	359,660	5.47	–0.40	8	–2
New Flemish Alliance	201,399	3.06	New	1	New
Ecolo	201,118	3.06	–4.29	4	–7
Agalev	162,205	2.47	–4.52	0	–9
National Front	130,012	1.98	+0.53	1	0
Vivant	81,337	1.24	–0.86	0	0
Chrétiens démocrates francophones	38,346	0.58	New	0	New
Liberal Appeal	29,868	0.45	New	0	New
Rassemblement Wallonie France	25,416	0.39	New	0	New
Workers' Party of Belgium	20,825	0.32	–0.18	0	0
RESIST	10,059	0.15	New	0	New
Belgian Union	10,034	0.15	New	0	New
Parti citoyenneté et prospérité	8,258	0.13	New	0	New
Socialist Movement	8,116	0.12	New	0	New
Communist Party of Belgium	6,759	0.10	–0.27	0	0
New Belgian Front	6,736	0.10	–0.26	0	0
MARIA	6,440	0.10	New	0	New
France	5,668	0.09	–0.03	0	0
Nation	4,190	0.06	New	0	New
VeiligBlauw	3,237	0.05	New	0	New
Left Socialist Party	2,929	0.04	New	0	New
Communist Party–RDS	2,522	0.04	New	0	New
CHOPE	2,430	0.04	New	0	New
RDS–Communist Party	2,084	0.03	New	0	New
UFE	1,910	0.03	New	0	New
OMNIUM	1,616	0.02	New	0	New
PDA	1,415	0.02	New	0	New
Vrijheid, Intimiteit, Thuis, Arbeid en Liefde	1,325	0.02	New	0	New
Noor	1,141	0.02	+0.00	0	0
DL	1,052	0.02	New	0	New
MDT	914	0.01	New	0	New
Parti humaniste–Humanistische Partij	521	0.01	+0.01	0	0
PPR	376	0.01	New	0	New
Total	6,572,189	100.00	–	150	0
Valid votes	6,572,189	94.75			
Invalid/blank votes	364,412	5.25			
Total votes	6,936,601	100.00			
Registered voters/turnout	7,570,637	91.63			
Source: IBZ

=== Senate ===
Party	Votes	%	+/–	Seats	+/–
Socialistische Partij Anders–Spirit	1,013,560	15.47	+6.59	7	+3
Vlaamse Liberalen en Democraten	1,007,868	15.38	+0.01	7	+1
Parti Socialiste	840,908	12.84	+3.19	6	+2
Christen-Democratisch en Vlaams	832,849	12.71	–2.03	6	0
Mouvement Réformateur	795,757	12.15	+1.58	5	0
Vlaams Blok	741,940	11.32	+1.91	5	+1
Centre démocrate humaniste	362,705	5.54	–0.49	2	–1
Ecolo	208,868	3.19	–4.21	1	–2
New Flemish Alliance	200,273	3.06	New	0	New
Agalev	161,024	2.46	–4.62	0	–3
National Front	147,305	2.25	+0.75	1	+1
Vivant	86,723	1.32	–0.66	0	0
Chrétiens démocrates francophones	38,339	0.59	New	0	New
Rassemblement Wallonie France	27,424	0.42	New	0	New
Liberal Appeal	26,629	0.41	New	0	New
Workers' Party of Belgium	18,699	0.29	+0.11	0	0
RESIST	17,604	0.27	New	0	New
Left Socialist Party	8,337	0.13	New	0	New
VeiligBlauw	8,048	0.12	New	0	New
Social Liberal Democrats	6,651	0.10	–0.02	0	0
Total	6,551,511	100.00	–	40	0
Valid votes	6,551,511	94.48			
Invalid/blank votes	383,093	5.52			
Total votes	6,934,604	100.00			
Registered voters/turnout	7,570,637	91.60			
Source: IBZ
