= 2004 European Parliament election in Belgium =

- 13 June 2004

24 seats to the European Parliament
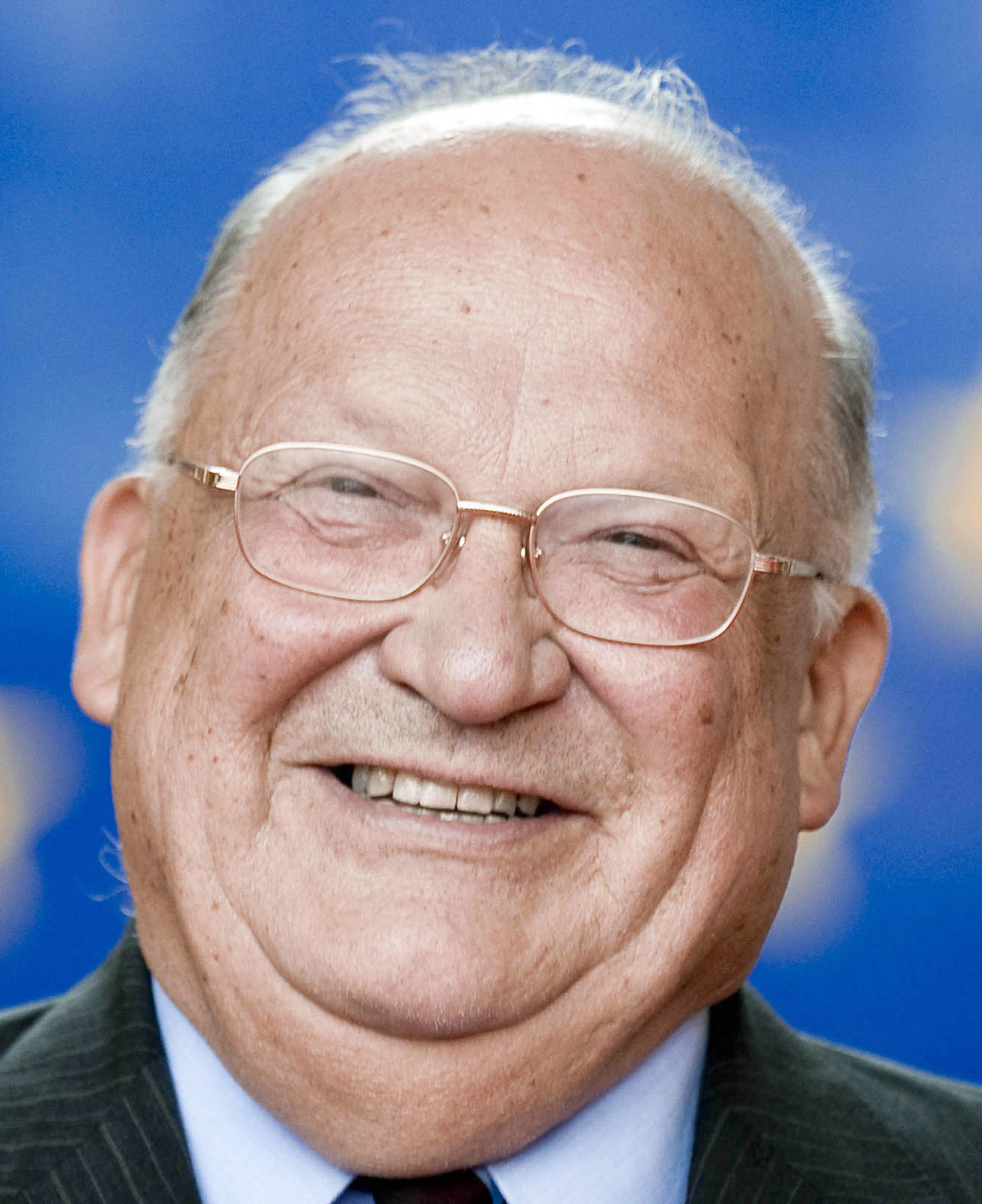

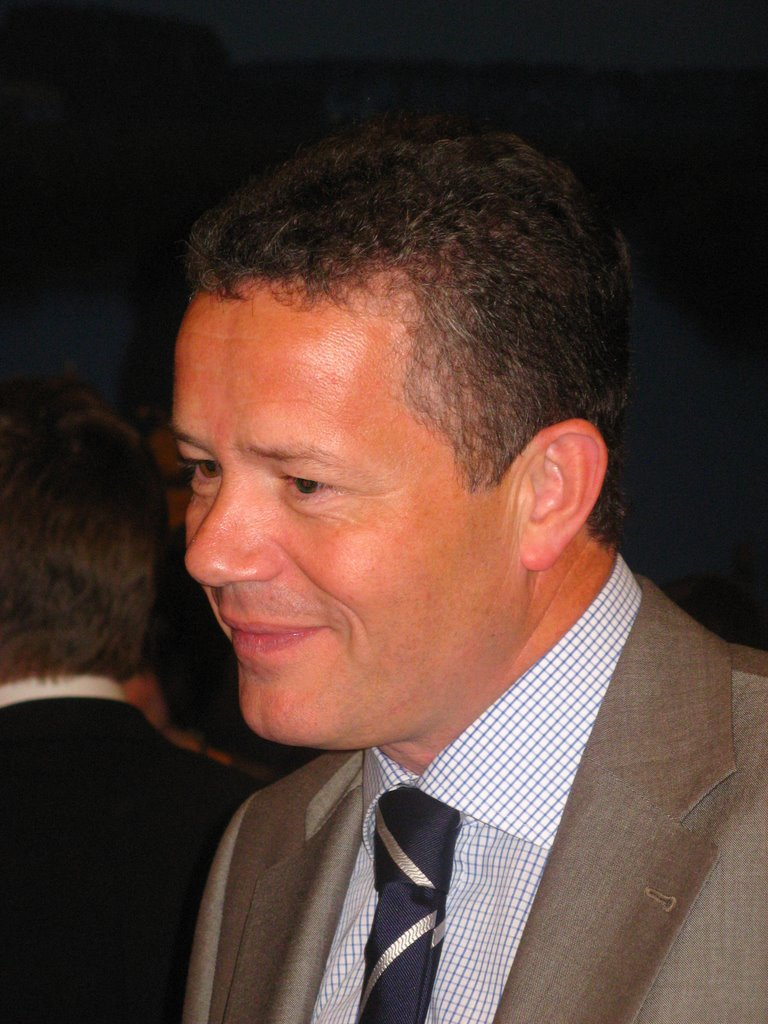

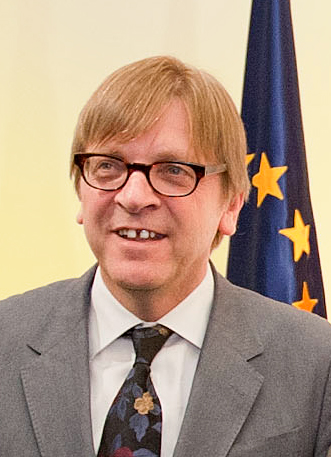

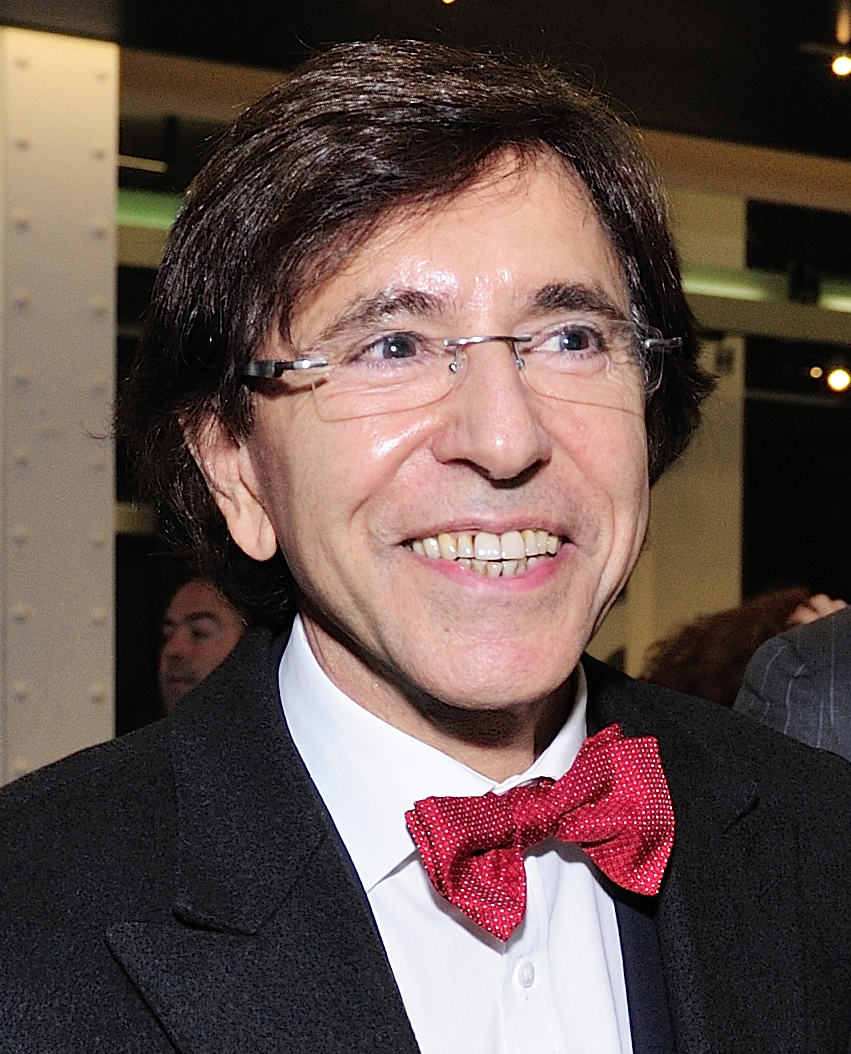
	First party	Second party
Leader	Jean-Luc Dehaene	Frank Vanhecke
Party	CD&V	Vlaams Blok
Alliance	EPP
Last election	3 seats, 13.49%	2 seats, 9.39%
Seats won	4	3
Seat change	▲1	▲1
Popular vote	1,131,119	930,731
Percentage	17.43%	14.43%
Swing	▲3.94%	▲4.95%
	Third party	Fourth party
Leader	Guy Verhofstadt	Elio Di Rupo
Party	Open Vld	PS
Alliance	ALDE	PES
Last election	3 seats, 13.61%	3 seats, 9.59%
Seats won	3	4
Seat change	Steady	▲1
Popular vote	880,279	878,577
Percentage	13.56%	13.54%
Swing	▼1.13%	▲3.95%

Elections to the European Parliament were held in Belgium on 13 June 2004. The elections produced little overall change in the distribution of seats in the European Parliament among Belgium's many political parties. The two socialist parties improved their vote, while the Green parties lost ground. The Flemish nationalist party the Flemish Bloc (Vlaams Blok) registered the largest gains.

== Results ==
Party	Votes	%	Seats
French-speaking electoral college
Socialist Party	878,577	36.09	4
Reformist Movement	671,422	27.58	3
Humanist Democratic Centre	368,753	15.15	1
Ecolo	239,687	9.84	1
National Front	181,351	7.45	0
New Belgian Front	26,775	1.10	0
Rassemblement Wallonie France	23,090	0.95	0
Francophone Christian Democrats	19,718	0.81	0
Workers' Party of Belgium	19,645	0.81	0
Movement for a Socialist Alternative	5,675	0.23	0
Total	2,434,693	100.00	9
Dutch-speaking electoral college
Christian Democratic and Flemish–New Flemish Alliance	1,131,119	28.15	4
Vlaams Blok	930,731	23.16	3
Flemish Liberals and Democrats–Vivant	880,279	21.91	3
Socialist Party Differently–Spirit	716,317	17.83	3
Green!	320,874	7.99	1
Workers' Party of Belgium	24,807	0.62	0
Left Socialist Party	14,166	0.35	0
Total	4,018,293	100.00	14
German-speaking electoral college
Christian Social Party	15,722	42.49	1
Partei für Freiheit und Fortschritt–Reformist Movement	8,434	22.79	0
Socialist Party	5,527	14.94	0
Ecolo	3,880	10.49	0
Non-Party Young Independents–PDB	3,442	9.30	0
Total	37,005	100.00	1
Valid votes	6,489,991	94.63	
Invalid/blank votes	367,995	5.37	
Total votes	6,857,986	100.00	
Registered voters/turnout	7,552,240	90.81	
Source: Belgian Elections
