= Paul-Henry Gendebien =

Belgian economist and politician (1939–2024)

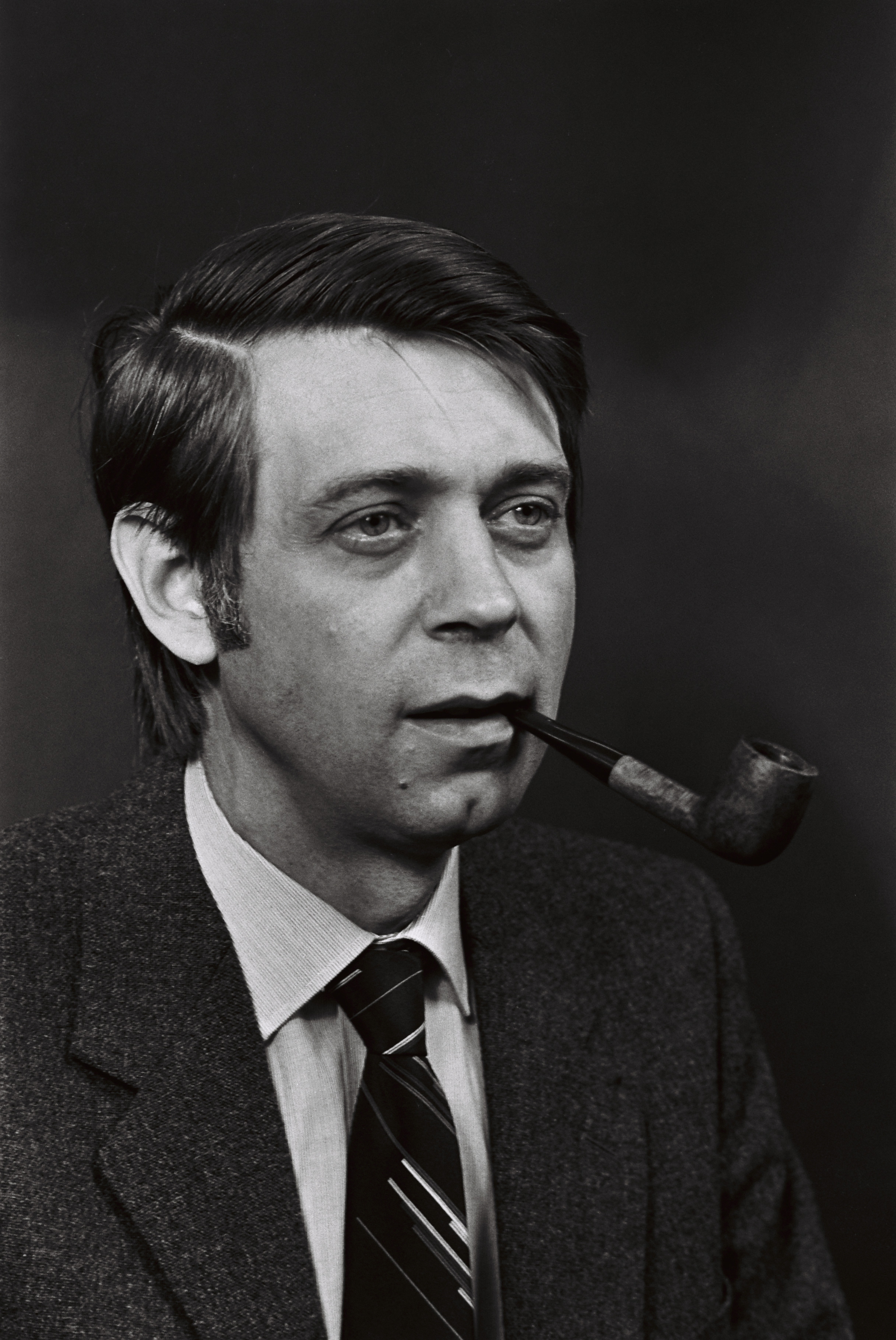
- Gendebien in 1979

President of the Rassemblement Wallonie France
- In office 1999 – 3 May 2024

Member of the European Parliament for the French-speaking electoral college
- In office 17 July 1979 – 23 July 1984

Member of the Chamber of Representatives of Belgium
- In office 1985–1988
- In office 1971–1981

Personal details
- Born: 9 July 1939 Hastière, Belgium
- Died: 3 May 2024 (aged 84) Liège, Belgium
- Party: PSC; RW; RWF
- Education: Saint-Louis University, Brussels; Catholic University of Louvain
- Occupation: Economist

Paul-Henry Gendebien (9 July 1939 – 3 May 2024) was a Belgian economist and politician of the Walloon Rally (RW) and the Rassemblement Wallonie France (RWF). He was descended from Alexandre Gendebien, who was Belgium's first Minister of Justice.

== Biography ==
Born in Hastière on 9 July 1939, he was the son of World War II pilot Marc Gendebien and Guillemette Carton de Wiart, who herself was the daughter of former Prime Minister Henry Carton de Wiart. He earned a Doctor of Laws in 1962 and a licentiate in economic sciences in 1964 from Saint-Louis University, Brussels and subsequently studied at the Catholic University of Louvain. After his studies, he became a researcher at the Center for Socio-Political Research and Information and was an assistant professor at the University of Kinshasa from 1965 to 1967. From 1968 to 1971, he directed the economic research office at the Province of Hainaut.

In response to the Leuven Affair, Gendebien left the Christian Social Party and joined the Walloon Rally (RW). In 1971, he was elected to the Chamber of Representatives and, in 1979, he was elected as a member of the European Parliament. However, he left the party in 1981 to join the Alliance démocratique wallonne and eventually settled with the Rassemblement Wallonie France, that he founded and became president in 1999.

Gendebien favored a split of Belgium similar to that of the dissolution of Czechoslovakia and an integration of Wallonia and Brussels into France. He also denounced the "Flemishization" of the Belgian state by the armed forces and the National Railway Company.

Paul-Henry Gendebien died in Liège on 3 May 2024, at the age of 84.

== Books ==
- Congo, 1963 (1964)
- L’Intervention des Nations unies au Congo (1968)
- L’Environnement… un problème politique pour la Wallonie, pour l’Europe, pour le Monde (1972)
- Une certaine idée de la Wallonie (1987)
- Splendeurs de la Liberté (1999)
- Le Choix de la France (2002)
- La Belgique : dernier quart-d'heure ? (2006)
- Wallons et Bruxellois, ensemble avec la France ! (2008)
- La raison et le cœur. Oui à la France (2010)
- Demain la Wallonie avec la France. Vers la réunification française (2013)
- Histoire d'une famille. Les Gendebien au temps des révolutions et des guerres européenne (2017)
- 1914-1918 Deux villages Wallons dans l'enfer de la grande guerre (2018)
- Mon séjour dans la fosse aux lions de la politique belge (2021)
