= RESIST (electoral list) =

RESIST is an electoral list formed as a result of the coalition between the Marxist–Leninist Workers' Party of Belgium (PTB; Partij van de Arbeit) and the Arab European League (AEL' Arabisch-Europese Liga) for the Belgian federal election, 2003 in the Flemish Region. RESIST was led by PTB lawyer Zohra Othman, herself an ethnic Arab of Moroccan extraction, and received 10,059 votes. Consequently, AEL distanced itself from PTB and formed a new party called the Moslim Democratische Partij.

== See also ==
- National Museum of the Resistance, a WWII museum in Belgium
- Resistance during World War II
