= Muhammad (surah) =

47th chapter of the Qur'an

Surah 47 of the Quran
محمد Muḥammad Muhammad
- Qira'ah; English text
- Classification: Medinan
- Position: Juzʼ 26
- No. of verses: 38
- No. of Rukus: 4
- No. of words: 615
- No. of letters: 2400

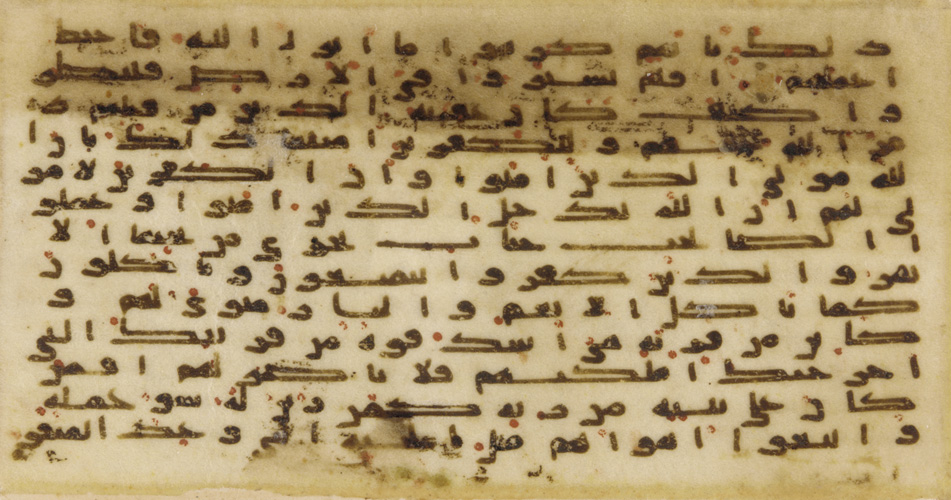
9th century North African folio of ayah 9–15

Muhammad (Arabic: محمد, muḥammad; "Chapter of Muhammad") is the 47th chapter (surah) of the Quran with 38 verses (ayat).

The title is derived from the direct mentioning of the Islamic prophet Muhammad in 47:2. It also has the name of Al-Qitāl (Arabic: القتال), which translates to fighting due to the context of the sura. This sura pertains to a specific conflict that arose from people prohibiting the acceptance and spread of Islam. It refers to the Battle of Badr, where an army was being gathered to attack Medina. The Battle of Badr took place during Ramadan, in year 2 of the Islamic calendar.

== Summary ==
- 1 The works of those who oppose Islam shall come to naught
- 2-3 True believers shall receive the expiation of their sins
- 4-5 How enemies of Islam are to be treated in war
- 6-8 God will reward those who fight for Islam
- 9-12 God will utterly destroy the unbelievers
- 13-17 The final condition of believers and infidels contrasted
- 18-20 Hypocrites reproved and warned
- 21 Obey God and speak kindly; trust in God for better outcomes
- 22-33 Cowardly Muslims and hypocrites rebuked and warned
- 34-36 Those who would dissuade Muslims from their duty warned
- 37 God does not pressure a soul more than it can take
- 38 Muslims exhorted to liberality in contributing towards the expenses of holy war

== See also ==
- Muhammad in Islam
