= Rassemblement Wallonie France =

Rally Wallonia France Rassemblement Wallonie France
- Leader: Laurent Brogniet
- Founded: 27 November 1999
- Ideology: Walloon Movement; Partitionism; Rattachism; Pluralism; Republicanism
- Colors: Blue, white, and red

Website
- https://rwf.be

The Rassemblement Wallonie France (French pronunciation: [ʁasɑ̃bləmɑ̃ walɔni fʁɑ̃s], Rally Wallonia France, RWF) is a small political party in Belgium. It is active in Wallonia and the Brussels-Capital Region. In Brussels it is known as the Rassemblement Bruxelles France or RBF. Its aim is the secession of Wallonia, Brussels and the six Flemish municipalities with language facilities for French-speakers around Brussels from Belgium and to unite them with France.

The party's symbol is the red rooster, representing Wallonia, inside a hexagon, which is a common geometric representation of France. The blue, white, and red represent the colours of the French national flag.

== History ==
Defending the principles of republicanism, democracy, pluralism, and socialism, the party was founded on 27 November 1999 in Charleroi. It was established on the basis of a reconciliation between three organisations: André Libert's Rassemblement Wallon (RW); Paul-Henry Gendebien's Democratic Alliance Wallone (AWD), which was formed in 1985 when Gendebien left the Social Christian Party (PSC); and the Walloon Movement for the Return to France (RF), chaired by Maurice Lebeau. In the 2003 federal elections, the party was presented under the label "RWF-RBF". It was presented again under the label "RWF" in the 2007 federal elections, and received 1.5% of votes in the Senate against 1.2% in the Chamber of Representatives in Wallonia.

The RWF is present in every election in Wallonia and Brussels. In the 2009 regional elections, the party won 1.37% of the vote for the Walloon Parliament. In the 2009 European elections, it won 0.43% of the vote in the French-speaking electoral college.

The RWF was refounded in 2010 on the proposal of President Paul-Henry Gendebien and the executive board.

In March 2012, the Constitutional Convention elected Laurent Brogniet as the new President of the RWF, and Paul-Henry Gendebien became founding president. New statutes were subject to the approval of Congress.

== See also ==
- Natural borders of France
- Political parties in Belgium
- Rattachism
- Greater Netherlands ideology
