= North-West Italy (European Parliament constituency) =

Constituency of the European Parliament

- European Parliament constituency
- Location among the current constituencies

- Shown in Italy in red
- Member state: Italy
- Created: 1979
- MEPs: 20 (2014, 2019, 2024); 21 (2009); 23 (2004); 26 (1999); 23 (1984); 25 (1979, 1989, 1994)

North-West Italy is a constituency of the European Parliament in Italy. It consists of the regions of Aosta Valley, Liguria, Lombardy, and Piedmont.

As the other Italian constituencies, it has only a procedural goal to choose the elected MEPs inside party lists, the distribution of seats between different parties being calculated at national level (called Collegio Unico Nazionale, National Single Constituency).

== Background information ==
Year	Electorate	Votes	Turnout	Blank & Invalid votes	Valid votes
1979	11,627,452	10,318,960	88.75%	361,261	9,967,867
1984	12,070,999	10,437,340	86.47%	532,579	9,904,761
1989	12,399,499	10,406,067	83.92%	772,304	9,633,763
1994	12,746,127	9,990,019	78.38%	594,676	9,395,343
1999	12,796,526	9,474,034	74.04%	761,178	8,712,856
2004	12,797,155	9,600,091	75.02%	679,533	8,920,558
2009	12,823,169	9,117,216	71.70%	424,699	8,692,517
2014	12,851,872	8,389,127	65.28%	411,053	7,978,074
2019	12,991,551	8,141,426	62.67%	276,019	7,865,407
2024	13,133,282	7,130,054	54.29%	363,329	6,766,423

Source: Italian Ministry of the Interior

=== Seats by party ===
==== 1979–1994 ====
Party	1979	1984	1989
Christian Democracy (DC)	8	7	7
Italian Communist Party (PCI)	7	7	5
Italian Socialist Party (PSI)	3	3	4
Italian Liberal Party (PLI)	2	2	1
Italian Social Movement (MSI)	1	1	1
Italian Democratic Socialist Party (PSDI)	1	1	1
Italian Republican Party (PRI)	1	0	0
Radical Party (PR)	1	1	1
Proletarian Democracy (DP)	1	1	1
Lega Lombarda (LL)			2
Federation of Green Lists (FLV)			1
Rainbow Greens (VA)			1
Total	25	23	25

==== Since 1994 ====
Party		1994	1999	2004	2009	2014	2019	2024
Forza Italia	FI	9	7	5		3	2	2
Lega Nord / Lega	LN	4	3	3	5	2	9	3
National Alliance	AN	2	2	2				
The People of Freedom	PdL				8			
Brothers of Italy	FdI					0	2	7
New Centre-Right	NCD					1		
Democratic Party of the Left	PDS	3						
Italian People's Party	PPI	2	1					
Democrats of the Left	DS		3					
The Olive Tree				6				
Democratic Party	PD				5	9	5	5
Communist Refoundation Party	PRC	2	1	1	0	0	0	
Party of Italian Communists	PdCI		1	1				
The Democrats	Dem		2					
Italy of Values	IdV			1	2	0		
Federation of the Greens	FdV	1	1	1		0	0	
Greens and Left Alliance	AVS							2
Italian Radicals	RI	1	3	1	0			
Segni Pact	PS	1						
United Christian Democrats	CDU		1					
Union of the Centre	UDC			1	1			
Pensioners' Party	PP		1	1				
The Other Europe with Tsipras	AET					1		
Five Star Movement	M5S					4	2	1
Total		25	26	23	21	20	20	20
Source: Italian Ministry of the Interior

== Current MEPs ==
MEPs for North-West Italy elected to the 10th European Parliament session
2024–2029
Name	Gender	National party	Group	Period	Preference vote
Giorgia Meloni	Female	Brothers of Italy	ECR	Never sworn in	624,907
Cecilia Strada	Female	Democratic Party	S&D	16 July 2024 – Present	284,785
Giorgio Gori	Male	Democratic Party	S&D	16 July 2024 – Present	211,426
Roberto Vannacci	Male	National Future	ESN	16 July 2024 – Present	186,966
Ilaria Salis	Female	Greens and Left Alliance	The Left	16 July 2024 – Present	127,257
Antonio Tajani	Male	Forza Italia	EPP	Never sworn in	107,274
Irene Tinagli	Female	Democratic Party	S&D	16 July 2024 – Present	78,933
Silvia Sardone	Female	Lega	P4E	16 July 2024 – Present	75,253
Brando Benifei	Male	Democratic Party	S&D	16 July 2024 – Present	64,831
Carlo Fidanza	Male	Brothers of Italy	ECR	16 July 2024 – Present	50,804
Pierfrancesco Maran	Male	Democratic Party	S&D	16 July 2024 – Present	45,468
Letizia Moratti	Female	Forza Italia	EPP	16 July 2024 – Present	41,968
Isabella Tovaglieri	Female	Lega	P4E	16 July 2024 – Present	40,017
Mario Mantovani	Male	Brothers of Italy	ECR	16 July 2024 – Present	39,080
Massimiliano Salini	Male	Forza Italia	EPP	16 July 2024 – Present	36,696
Giovanni Crosetto	Male	Brothers of Italy	ECR	16 July 2024 – Present	34,009
Benedetta Scuderi	Female	Greens and Left Alliance	Greens/EFA	16 July 2024 – Present	20,685
Lara Magoni	Female	Brothers of Italy	ECR	16 July 2024 – Present	20,403
Pietro Fiocchi	Male	Brothers of Italy	ECR	16 July 2024 – Present	19,172
Mariateresa Vivaldini	Female	Brothers of Italy	ECR	16 July 2024 – Present	18,796
Paolo Inselvini	Male	Brothers of Italy	ECR	16 July 2024 – Present	16,865
Gaetano Pedullà	Male	Five Star Movement	The Left	16 July 2024 – Present	15,921

== Elections ==
=== 1979 ===
Summary of the results of North-West Italy election to the European Parliament · 10 June 1979
National party	European group	Main candidate	Votes	%	Seats
Christian Democracy (DC)	EPP	Benigno Zaccagnini	3,426,574	34.35	8 / 25
Italian Communist Party (PCI)	COM	Gian Carlo Pajetta	2,856,313	28.66	7 / 25
Italian Socialist Party (PSI)	SOC	Bettino Craxi	1,240,108	12.44	3 / 25
Italian Liberal Party (PLI)	LD	Sergio Pininfarina	625,173	6.27	2 / 25
Italian Democratic Socialist Party (PSDI)	SOC	Mauro Ferri	468,155	4.70	1 / 25
Radical Party (PR)	TGI	Marco Pannella	410,716	4.12	1 / 25
Italian Social Movement (MSI)	NI	Giorgio Almirante	333,559	3.35	1 / 25
Italian Republican Party (PRI)	LD	Susanna Agnelli	297,865	2.99	1 / 25
Proletarian Democracy (DP)	TGI	Mario Capanna	91,576	0.92	1 / 25
Proletarian Unity Party (PdUP)	TGI	Lucio Magri	111,073	1.11	0 / 25
Others (parties and candidates that won less than 1% of the vote and no seats)			109,755	1.10	0 / 25
Valid votes			9,967,867		
Blank and invalid votes			361,261		
Totals			10,318,960	100.00	25 / 25
Eligible voters and turnout			11,627,452	88.75	
Source: Italian Ministry of the Interior

=== 1984 ===
Summary of the results of North-West Italy election to the European Parliament · 17 June 1984
National party	European group	Main candidate	Votes	%	+/-	Seats	+/-
Christian Democracy (DC)	EPP	Roberto Formigoni	3,216,336	32.47	▼1.88	7 / 23	▼1
Italian Communist Party (PCI)	COM	Gian Carlo Pajetta	3,142,339	31.73	▲3.07	7 / 23	0
Italian Socialist Party (PSI)	SOC	Carlo Tognoli	1,217,774	12.44	▼0.15	3 / 23	0
Liberal Party–Republican Party (PLI–PRI)	LD	Sergio Pininfarina	898,821	9.07	▼0.19	2 / 23	▼1
Italian Social Movement (MSI)	ER	Francesco Petronio	451,031	4.55	▲1.20	1 / 23	0
Radical Party (PR)	NI	Enzo Tortora	398,053	4.02	▼0.10	1 / 23	0
Italian Democratic Socialist Party (PSDI)	SOC	Pier Luigi Romita	324,948	3.28	▼1.42	1 / 23	0
Proletarian Democracy (DP)	RBW	Emilio Molinari	189,838	1.92	▲1.0	1 / 23	0
Others (parties and candidates that won less than 1% of the vote and no seats)			65,621	0.67	▼0.43	0 / 23	0
Valid votes			9,904,761				
Blank and invalid votes			532,579				
Totals			10,437,340	100.00	—	23 / 23	▼2
Eligible voters and turnout			12,070,999	86.47	▼2.28		
Source: Italian Ministry of the Interior

=== 1989 ===
Summary of the results of North-West Italy election to the European Parliament · 18 June 1989
National party	European group	Main candidate	Votes	%	+/-	Seats	+/-
Christian Democracy (DC)	EPP	Giovanni Goria	2,907,623	30.18	▼2.29	7 / 25	0
Italian Communist Party (PCI)	EUL	Achille Occhetto	2,423,549	25.16	▼6.57	5 / 25	▼2
Italian Socialist Party (PSI)	SOC	Bettino Craxi	1,465,601	15.21	▲2.77	4 / 25	▲1
Lega Nord–Lega Lombarda (LN–LL)	RBW	Umberto Bossi	542,201	5.63		2 / 25	
Liberal Party–Republican Party (PLI–PRI)	LDR	Jas Gawronski	498,434	5.17	▼3.90	1 / 25	▼1
Italian Social Movement (MSI)	NI	Gianfranco Fini	430,021	4.46	▼0.09	1 / 25	0
Federation of Green Lists (FLV)	G	Gianfranco Amendola	387,387	4.02		1 / 25	
Rainbow Greens (VA)	G	Edo Ronchi	281,428	2.92		1 / 25	
Italian Democratic Socialist Party (PSDI)	SOC	Enrico Ferri	228,293	2.37	▼0.91	1 / 25	0
Proletarian Democracy (DP)	G	Eugenio Melandri	152,116	1.58	▼0.34	1 / 25	0
Antiprohibitionist List (LA)	G	Marco Taradash	111,285	1.16		1 / 25	
Others (parties and candidates that won less than 1% of the vote and no seats)			205,825	2.13	▼1.46	0 / 25	0
Valid votes			9,633,763				
Blank and invalid votes			772,304				
Totals			10,406,067	100.00	—	25 / 25	▲2
Eligible voters and turnout			12,399,499	83.92	▼2.55		
Source: Italian Ministry of the Interior

=== 1994 ===
Summary of the results of North-West Italy election to the European Parliament · 12 June 1994
National party	European group	Main candidate	Votes	%	+/-	Seats	+/-
Forza Italia (FI)	FE	Silvio Berlusconi	3,246,029	34.55		9 / 25	
Lega Nord (LN)	ELDR	Umberto Bossi	1,393,415	14.83	▲9.20	4 / 25	▲2
Democratic Party of the Left (PDS)	PES	Achille Occhetto	1,364,811	14.53		3 / 25	
Italian People's Party (PPI)	EPP	Svevo Colombo	870,597	9.27		2 / 25	
National Alliance (AN)	NI	Gianfranco Fini	645,534	6.87		2 / 25	
Communist Refoundation Party (PRC)	EUL	Fausto Bertinotti	549,234	5.85		2 / 25	
Federation of the Greens (FdV)	G	Carlo Ripa di Meana	318,211	3.39		1 / 25	
Segni Pact (PS)	EPP	Mariotto Segni	275,040	2.93		1 / 25	
Pannella List (LP)	ERA	Marco Pannella	260,303	2.77		1 / 25	
Others (parties and candidates that won less than 1% of the vote and no seats)			430,060	5.01	▲2.88	0 / 25	0
Valid votes			9,395,343				
Blank and invalid votes			594,676				
Totals			9,990,019	100.00	—	25 / 25	0
Eligible voters and turnout			12,746,127	78.38	▼5.54		
Source: Italian Ministry of the Interior

=== 1999 ===
Summary of the results of North-West Italy election to the European Parliament · 13 June 1999
National party	European group	Main candidate	Votes	%	+/-	Seats	+/-
Forza Italia (FI)	EPP	Silvio Berlusconi	2,574,092	29.54	▼5.01	7 / 26	▼2
Democrats of the Left (DS)	PES	Bruno Trentin	1,221,331	14.02	▼0.51	3 / 26	0
Bonino List (LB)	TGI	Emma Bonino	1,042,515	11.97	▲9.20	3 / 26	▲2
Lega Nord (LN)	TGI	Umberto Bossi	916,886	10.52	▼4.31	3 / 26	▼1
The Democrats (Dem)	ELDR	Antonio Di Pietro	632,014	7.25		2 / 26	
National Alliance (AN)	UEN	Gianfranco Fini	581,532	6.67	▼0.20	2 / 26	0
Communist Refoundation Party (PRC)	GUE/NGL	Fausto Bertinotti	375,881	4.31	▼1.54	1 / 26	▼1
Italian People's Party (PPI)	EPP	Guido Bodrato	215,637	2.47	▼6.80	1 / 26	▼1
United Christian Democrats (CDU)	EPP	Rocco Buttiglione	192,294	2.21		1 / 26	
Party of Italian Communists (PdCI)	GUE/NGL	Armando Cossutta	187,858	2.16		1 / 26	
Federation of the Greens (FdV)	Greens/EFA	Reinhold Messner	159,568	1.83	▼1.56	1 / 26	0
Pensioners' Party (PP)	EPP	Carlo Fatuzzo	97,073	1.11		1 / 26	
Others (parties and candidates that won less than 1% of the vote and no seats)			516,355	5.92	▲0.91	0 / 26	0
Valid votes			8,712,856				
Blank and invalid votes			761,178				
Totals			9,474,034	100.00	—	26 / 26	▲1
Eligible voters and turnout			12,796,526	74.04	▼4.34		
Source: Italian Ministry of the Interior

=== 2004 ===
Summary of the results of North-West Italy election to the European Parliament · 12–13 June 2004
National party	European group	Main candidate	Votes	%	+/-	Seats	+/-
The Olive Tree	Several (Note: The coalition was composed by Democrats of the Left (DS), Democracy is Freedom – The Daisy (DL), Italian Democratic Socialists (SDI) and European Republicans Movement (MRE), members of PES, EDP, PES and ALDE groups respectively.)	Pier Luigi Bersani	2,521,411	28.27		6 / 23	
Forza Italia (FI)	EPP	Silvio Berlusconi	2,167,169	24.29	▼5.25	5 / 23	▼2
Lega Nord (LN)	NI	Umberto Bossi	995,057	11.15	▲0.63	3 / 23	0
National Alliance (AN)	AEN	Gianfranco Fini	697,932	7.82	▲1.15	2 / 23	0
Communist Refoundation Party (PRC)	GUE/NGL	Fausto Bertinotti	529,564	5.94	▲1.63	1 / 23	0
Union of the Centre (UDC)	EPP	Marco Follini	358,066	4.01		1 / 23	
Bonino List (LB)	NI	Emma Bonino	251,650	2.82	▼9.15	1 / 23	▼2
Federation of the Greens (FdV)	Greens/EFA	Alfonso Pecoraro Scanio	202,445	2.27	▲0.44	1 / 23	0
Party of Italian Communists (PdCI)	GUE/NGL	Marco Rizzo	197,531	2.21	▲0.05	1 / 23	0
Italy of Values (IdV)	ALDE	Antonio Di Pietro	171,239	1.92		1 / 23	
Pensioners' Party (PP)	EPP	Carlo Fatuzzo	157,376	1.76	▲0.65	1 / 23	0
Others (parties and candidates that won less than 1% of the vote and no seats)			671,028	7.51	▲1.59	0 / 23	0
Valid votes			8,920,558				
Blank and invalid votes			679,533				
Totals			9,600,091	100.00	—	23 / 23	▼3
Eligible voters and turnout			12,797,155	75.02	▲0.98		
Source: Italian Ministry of the Interior

=== 2009 ===
Summary of the results of North-West Italy election to the European Parliament · 6–7 June 2009
National party	European group	Main candidate	Votes	%	+/–	Seats	+/–
The People of Freedom (PdL)	EPP	Silvio Berlusconi	2,898,314	33.39		8 / 21	
Democratic Party (PD)	S&D	Sergio Cofferati	1,999,623	23.04		5 / 21	
Lega Nord (LN)	UEN	Umberto Bossi	1,684,121	19.40	▲8.15	5 / 21	▲2
Italy of Values (IdV)	ALDE	Antonio Di Pietro	634,573	7.31	▲5.39	2 / 21	▲1
Union of the Centre (UDC)	EPP	Magdi Allam	459,998	5.30	▲1.29	1 / 21	0
Federation of the Left (FdS)	GUE/NGL	Margherita Hack	260,816	3.00	▼2.94	0 / 21	▼1
Bonino-Pannella List (LB)	NI	Emma Bonino	250,619	2.89	▲0.07	0 / 21	▼1
Left and Freedom (SL)	GUE/NGL	Nichi Vendola	181,938	2.10		0 / 21	
Others (parties and candidates that won less than 1% of the vote and no seats)			309,515	3.56	—	0 / 21	0
Valid votes			8,679,517				
Blank and invalid votes			424,571				
Totals			9,104,088	100.00	—	21 / 21	▼2
Eligible voters and turnout			12,697,349	71.70	▼3.85		
Source: Italian Ministry of the Interior

=== 2014 ===
Summary of the results of North-West Italy election to the European Parliament · 25 May 2014
National party	European group	Main candidate	Votes	%	+/–	Seats	+/–
Democratic Party (PD)	S&D	Alessia Mosca	3,234,068	40.62	▲17.58	9 / 20	▲4
Five Star Movement (M5S)	NI		1,467,188	18.43		4 / 20	
Forza Italia (FI)	EPP	Giovanni Toti	1,293,275	16.24		3 / 20	
Lega Nord (LN)	EFN	Matteo Salvini	933,135	11.72	▼7.68	2 / 20	▼3
The Other Europe with Tsipras (AET)	GUE/NGL	Moni Ovadia	303,805	3.82		1 / 20	
New Centre-Right (NCD)	EPP	Maurizio Lupi	276,143	3.47		1 / 20	
Brothers of Italy (FdI)	ECR	Giorgia Meloni	254,453	3.20		0 / 20	
European Greens – Green Italia (EV)	Green/EFA	Monica Frassoni	80,762	1.01		0 / 20	
Others (parties and candidates that won less than 1% of the vote and no seats)			119,479	1.50	—	0 / 20	0
Valid votes			7,962,308				
Blank and invalid votes			410,387				
Totals			8,372,695	100.00	—	20 / 20	▼1
Eligible voters and turnout			12,689,459	65.98	▼5.72		
Source: Italian Ministry of the Interior

=== 2019 ===
Summary of the results of North-West Italy election to the European Parliament · 26 May 2019
National party	European group	Main candidate	Votes	%	+/–	Seats	+/–
Lega	ID	Matteo Salvini	3,190,306	40.70	▲28.28	9 / 20	▲7
Democratic Party (PD)	S&D	Giuliano Pisapia	1,838,355	23.45	▼17.17	5 / 20	▼4
Five Star Movement (M5S)	NI		871,370	11.12	▼7.31	2 / 20	▼2
Forza Italia (FI)	EPP	Silvio Berlusconi	689,433	8.80	▼7.44	2 / 20	▼1
Brothers of Italy (FdI)	ECR	Giorgia Meloni	443,136	5.65	▲2.45	2 / 20	▲2
More Europe (+E)	RE	Benedetto Della Vedova	246,824	3.15		0 / 20	
Green Europe (EV)	Green/EFA	Pippo Civati	190,778	2.43		0 / 20	
The Left (LS)	GUE/NGL		115,445	1.47	▼2.35	0 / 20	▼1
Others (parties and candidates that won less than 1% of the vote and no seats)			253,090	3.22	—	0 / 20	0
Valid votes			7,838,737				
Blank and invalid votes			274,949				
Totals			8,113,686	100.00	—	20 / 20	Steady
Eligible voters and turnout			12,760,430	63.58	▼2.40		
Source: Italian Ministry of the Interior

=== 2024 ===
Summary of the results of North-West Italy election to the European Parliament · 8–9 June 2024
National party	European group	Main candidate	Votes	%	+/–	Seats	+/–
Brothers of Italy (FdI)	ECR	Giorgia Meloni	2,086,659	30.84	▲25.19	7 / 20	▲5
Democratic Party (PD)	S&D	Cecilia Strada	1,561,797	23.08	▼0.37	5 / 20	0
Lega	ID	Roberto Vannacci	802,884	11.87	▼28.83	3 / 20	▼6
Forza Italia (FI)	EPP	Antonio Tajani	634,028	9.37	▲0.57	2 / 20	0
Greens and Left Alliance (AVS)	The Left; Greens/EFA	Ilaria Salis	484,001	7.15	▲3.25	2 / 20	▲2
Five Star Movement (M5S)	NI		455,255	6.73	▼4.39	1 / 20	▼1
Action (A)	RE	Carlo Calenda	256,269	3.79		0 / 20	
United States of Europe (SUE)	RE	Matteo Renzi	256,083	3.78		0 / 20	
Peace Land Dignity (PTD)	The Left	Michele Santoro	140,701	2.08		0 / 20	
Others (parties and candidates that won less than 1% of the vote and no seats)			88,750	1.31	—	0 / 20	0
Valid votes			6,766,423				
Blank and invalid votes			363,629				
Totals			7,130,054	100.00	—	20 / 20	Steady
Eligible voters and turnout			13,133,282	54.29	▼9.29		
Source: Italian Ministry of the Interior
