= 1990 Italian local elections =

- 6–7 May 1990
- 41,965 seats in the city councils and 2,823 seats in the provincial councils
Party	Leader	Vote %	Seats	+/–
City councils
DC	Arnaldo Forlani	33.9	16386	+103
PCI	Achille Occhetto	22.8	9515	−2327
PSI	Bettino Craxi	17.8	7477	+1245
PRI	Giorgio La Malfa	4.2	1062	−96
PSDI	Antonio Cariglia	3.4	961	−395
MSI	Pino Rauti	3.1	621	−477
LN	Umberto Bossi	2.4	609	New
PLI	Renato Altissimo	2.2	370	−44
FLV – VA	Gianni Francesco Mattioli	1.9	495	New
LV	None	1.3	283	New
DP	Mario Capanna	0.6	47	−75
VA	None	0.5	74	New
SVP	Silvius Magnago	0.8	1551	−24
PSd'Az	Carlo Sanna	0.3	117	+5
AD	Marco Taradash	0.3	6	New
Others		4.3	2384	+806
Provincial councils
DC	Arnaldo Forlani	31.6	989	+38
PCI	Achille Occhetto	23.8	700	−124
PSI	Bettino Craxi	15.7	467	+93
MSI	Pino Rauti	4.2	126	−53
This lists parties that won seats. See the complete results below.

The 1990 Italian local elections were held on 6 and 7 May. The elections were held in 6,397 municipalities and 87 provinces.

== Municipal elections ==
=== Results summary ===
Party	Votes	%	Seats
Christian Democracy (DC)	7,354,589	33.9	16,386
Italian Communist Party (PCI)	4,943,547	22.8	9,515
Italian Socialist Party (PSI)	3,865,575	17.8	7,477
Italian Republican Party (PRI)	915,714	4.2	1,062
Italian Democratic Socialist Party (PSDI)	730,318	3.4	961
Italian Social Movement (MSI)	674,705	3.1	621
Lombard League (LL)	519,795	2.4	609
Italian Liberal Party (PLI)	470,256	2.2	370
Green List – Rainbow Greens (LV–VA)	414,605	1.9	495
Green List (LV)	284,976	1.3	283
Proletarian Democracy (DP)	121,869	0.6	47
Rainbow Greens (VA)	118,398	0.5	74
South Tyrolean People's Party (SVP)	166,119	0.8	1,551
Sardinian Action Party (PSd'Az)	71,276	0.3	117
Antiprohibitionists on Drugs	59,628	0.3	6
Venetian League (ŁV)	55,158	0.3	56
Leftist lists	51,887	0.2	163
Pentapartito	50,010	0.2	168
Pensioners' Party (PP)	12,056	0.1	6
Others	790,954	3.7	1,997
Total	21,671,727	100	41,965

=== City councils of main cities ===
Comune	Parties									
Comune	DC	PCI	PSI	MSI	PRI	PSDI	PLI	Greens	LN	Others
Aosta	9	7	7	-	2	-	-	2	-	13
Alessandria	11	14	17	1	1	1	1	3	1	1
Asti	15	8	11	1	1	1	1	1	1	-
Cuneo	18	3	5	-	3	3	3	3	2	-
Turin	17	24	10	4	6	2	5	5	3	4
Vercelli	14	10	9	1	-	1	1	2	2	-
Bergamo	20	5	5	2	2	-	1	3	11	1
Brescia	16	9	7	1	2	-	-	2	11	1
Como	14	4	7	1	1	1	1	3	8	-
Cremona	12	10	6	1	1	-	-	1	8	1
Mantua	10	12	8	1	1	-	1	3	4	-
Milan	17	16	16	3	5	1	2	4	11	5
Sondrio	15	4	9	1	-	2	1	1	7	-
Varese	13	5	6	1	2	-	1	2	9	1
Trento	20	5	8	1	2	2	1	5	-	6
Padua	21	8	7	3	2	1	2	3	2	-
Rovigo	16	8	8	1	-	2	1	3	-	-
Treviso	17	6	6	1	2	1	1	4	2	-
Venice	17	15	11	1	2	2	-	7	2	3
Verona	27	7	11	2	1	1	1	5	5	-
Vicenza	21	6	7	2	2	-	1	7	-	-
Gorizia										
Udine	19	11	6	2	3	2	1	-	-	6
Genoa	19	26	13	2	3	2	4	4	5	2
Imperia	14	8	6	-	1	2	1	1	-	7
La Spezia	15	18	8	1	2	1	-	3	1	-
Savona	10	15	7	1	1	-	1	2	3	-
Bologna	13	25	9	2	3	1	1	3	1	1
Ferrara	11	22	9	2	1	1	1	3	-	1
Forlì	10	22	5	1	9	-	-	2	-	-
Modena	12	25	6	1	2	-	1	3	-	-
Parma	14	17	9	1	2	1	-	3	3	-
Piacenza	14	13	7	3	1	2	3	2	-	5
Reggio Emilia	12	25	7	1	1	1	-	1	2	-
Arezzo	13	14	7	1	1	-	-	2	-	2
Florence	17	21	9	2	4	1	1	3	-	2
Livorno	11	25	8	1	2	-	-	3	-	-
Lucca	20	7	6	1	1	1	1	2	-	-
Massa	14	9	9	1	4	1	-	1	-	1
Pisa	14	16	10	2	3	1	1	2	-	1
Pistoia	11	18	5	1	2	1	-	2	-	-
Perugia	13	21	12	2	1	-	-	1	-	-
Terni	11	19	12	1	2	1	1	1	-	2
Ascoli Piceno	23	6	7	1	1	1	-	1	-	-
Macerata	17	6	7	2	5	1	-	2	-	-
Pesaro	12	16	7	1	1	-	-	1	-	2
Frosinone	18	4	6	3	2	4	1	1	-	1
Latina	25	3	7	2	1	1	1	-	-	-
Rieti	14	8	11	2	3	1	-	-	-	1
Viterbo	19	7	7	2	2	1	1	1	-	-
Chieti	28	5	4	1	1	-	-	1	-	-
L'Aquila	19	7	9	2	1	1	1	-	-	-
Pescara	23	8	10	2	2	2	2	1	-	-
Teramo	25	5	3	-	1	-	-	-	-	6
Campobasso	24	5	5	1	2	1	1	-	-	1
Isernia	27	7	4	-	1	1	-	-	-	-
Avellino	22	3	9	1	-	2	2	1	-	-
Benevento	19	2	12	1	2	3	1	-	-	-
Caserta	24	-	5	2	1	1	1	2	-	4
Salerno	14	6	17	2	4	4	-	1	-	2
Bari	23	6	20	2	3	3	2	1	-	-
Brindisi	15	5	10	2	4	2	1	1	-	-
Foggia	22	4	12	1	1	4	4	2	-	-
Lecce	16	3	10	4	3	1	-	-	-	1
Taranto	15	10	10	1	2	3	1	1	-	7
Potenza	23	5	7	1	-	3	1	-	-	-
Catanzaro	24	6	13	1	3	2	1	-	-	-
Cosenza	19	6	14	2	2	5	1	1	-	-
Cagliari	21	9	6	2	3	2	1	-	-	6
Nuoro	13	9	8	1	2	1	1	-	-	4
Oristano	19	4	5	1	1	5	1	-	-	4
Sassari	19	9	7	1	3	3	-	1	-	8
Agrigento	22	4	7	-	2	1	2	-	-	2
Caltanissetta	23	4	6	1	1	3	2	-	-	-
Enna	19	5	11	1	2	2	-	-	-	-
Messina	29	3	11	2	3	5	2	-	-	5
Palermo	42	6	11	3	4	4	4	2	-	2
Ragusa	17	9	7	1	2	2	2	-	-	-
Syracuse	28	6	6	1	2	2	1	-	-	1
Trapani	16	3	11	1	4	2	1	-	-	-

== Provincial elections ==
Party	Votes	%	Seats
Christian Democracy (DC)	11,119,983	31.6	989
Italian Communist Party (PCI)	8,402,003	23.8	700
Italian Socialist Party (PSI)	5,514,562	15.7	467
Italian Social Movement (MSI)	1,643,816	4.7	126
Italian Republican Party (PRI)	1,440,492	4.1	115
Lombard League (LL)	1,390,758	3.9	77
Italian Democratic Socialist Party (PSDI)	1,197,846	3.4	103
Italian Liberal Party (PLI)	842,452	2.4	54
Green List (LV)	833,614	2.4	46
Green List – Rainbow Greens (LV–VA)	598,490	1.7	53
Rainbow Greens (VA)	390,350	1.1	13
Proletarian Democracy (DP)	330,586	0.9	3
Antiprohibitionists on Drugs	305,144	0.9	4
Venetian League (ŁV)	168,341	0.5	12
Sardinian Action Party (PSd'Az)	135,762	0.4	14
Pensioners' Party (PP)	77,797	0.2	5
Friuli Movement (MF)	14,816	0.0	1
Others	817,609	2.3	41
Total	35,223,441	100	2,823
