= List of elections in 1984 =

The following elections occurred in the year 1984.

== Africa ==
- 1984 Algerian presidential election
- 1984 Beninese parliamentary election
- 1984 Botswana general election
- 1984 Burundian presidential election
- 1984 Cameroonian presidential election
- 1984 Comorian presidential election
- 1984 Congolese parliamentary election
- 1984 Egyptian parliamentary election
- 1984 Guinea-Bissau legislative election
- 1984 Moroccan parliamentary election
- 1984 Somali parliamentary election
- 1984 South African general election
- 1984 South African presidential election
- 1984 Seychellois presidential election
- 1984 Zairean presidential election

== Asia ==
- 1984 Egyptian parliamentary election
- 1984 Iranian legislative election
- 1984 Iraqi parliamentary election
- 1984 Israeli legislative election
- 1984 Philippine parliamentary election
- 1984 Singaporean general election
- 1984 Soviet Union legislative election
- 1984 Taiwan presidential election
- 1984 Turkish local elections

=== India ===
- 1984 Indian general election in Tamil Nadu
- 1984 Indian general election
- 1984 Indian vice presidential election
- 1984 Tamil Nadu Legislative Assembly election

== Europe ==
- 1984 Danish parliamentary election
- 1984 European Parliament election
- 1984 Faroese parliamentary election
- 1984 Gibraltar general election
- 1984 Icelandic presidential election
- 1984 Luxembourg general election
- 1984 Soviet Union legislative election
- 1984 Turkish local elections
- 1984 West German presidential election

=== European Parliament ===
- 1984 European Parliament election
- 1984 European Parliament election in Belgium
- 1984 European Parliament election in Denmark
- 1984 European Parliament election in Sardinia
- 1984 European Parliament election in the United Kingdom
- 1984 European Parliament election in France
- 1984 European Parliament election in Greece
- 1984 European Parliament election in Ireland
- 1984 European Parliament election in Italy
- 1984 European Parliament election in Luxembourg
- 1984 European Parliament election in the Netherlands
- 1984 European Parliament election in West Germany
- 1984 European Parliament election in France
- 1984 European Parliament election in West Germany
- 1984 European Parliament election in Italy
- 1984 European Parliament election in Sardinia

=== Spain ===
- 1984 Basque parliamentary election
- Catalan parliamentary election, 1984

=== United Kingdom ===
- 1984 Chesterfield by-election
- 1984 Cynon Valley by-election
- 1984 Enfield Southgate by-election
- 1984 European Parliament election in the United Kingdom
- 1984 Portsmouth South by-election
- 1984 Stafford by-election
- 1984 South West Surrey by-election

==== United Kingdom local ====
- 1984 Scottish District local elections
- 1984 United Kingdom local elections

===== English local =====
- 1984 Bristol City Council election
- 1984 Manchester Council election
- 1984 Trafford Council election
- 1984 Wolverhampton Council election

== North America ==
- 1984 Belizean legislative election
- 1984 Greenlandic general election
- 1984 Guatemalan Constitutional Assembly election
- 1984 Nicaraguan general election
- 1984 Panamanian general election
- 1984 Salvadoran presidential election

=== Canada ===
- 1984 Canadian federal election
- 1984 Edmonton municipal by-election
- 1984 Liberal Party of Canada leadership election
- 1984 Nova Scotia general election

=== Caribbean ===
- 1984 Anguillian general election
- 1984 Antiguan general election
- 1984 Caymanian general election
- 1984 Grenadian general election
- 1984 Haitian parliamentary election
- 1984 Puerto Rican general election
- 1984 Saint Kitts and Nevis general election
- 1984 Tobago House of Assembly election
- 1984 Turks and Caicos Islands general election
- 1984 Vincentian general election

=== United States ===
- 1984 United States elections
- 1984 United States presidential election

==== United States lieutenant gubernatorial ====
- 1984 Delaware lieutenant gubernatorial election
- 1984 Missouri lieutenant gubernatorial election
- 1984 North Carolina lieutenant gubernatorial election

==== United States gubernatorial ====
- 1984 Arkansas gubernatorial election
- 1984 Delaware gubernatorial election
- 1984 Indiana gubernatorial election
- 1984 Missouri gubernatorial election
- 1984 Montana gubernatorial election
- 1984 New Hampshire gubernatorial election
- 1984 North Carolina gubernatorial election
- 1984 North Dakota gubernatorial election
- 1984 Rhode Island gubernatorial election
- 1984 United States gubernatorial elections
- 1984 Utah gubernatorial election
- 1984 Vermont gubernatorial election
- 1984 Washington gubernatorial election
- 1984 West Virginia gubernatorial election

==== United States House of Representatives ====
- 1984 United States House of Representatives elections
- 1984 United States House of Representatives elections in Alabama
- 1984 United States House of Representatives election in Alaska
- 1984 United States House of Representatives elections in California
- 1984 United States House of Representatives election in Delaware
- 1984 United States House of Representatives election in the District of Columbia
- 1984 Indiana's 8th congressional district election
- 1984 United States House of Representatives elections in Nevada
- 1984 United States House of Representatives elections in New Hampshire
- 1984 United States House of Representatives elections in New Jersey
- 1984 United States House of Representatives election in North Dakota
- 1984 United States House of Representatives elections in Rhode Island
- 1984 United States House of Representatives elections in South Carolina
- 1984 United States House of Representatives elections in Tennessee
- 1984 United States House of Representatives elections in Texas
- 1984 United States House of Representatives election in Vermont
- 1984 United States House of Representatives election in Wyoming

==== United States Senate ====
- 1984 United States Senate elections
- 1984 United States Senate election in Alabama
- 1984 United States Senate election in Alaska
- 1984 United States Senate election in Arkansas
- 1984 United States Senate election in Colorado
- 1984 United States Senate election in Georgia
- 1984 United States Senate election in Idaho
- 1984 United States Senate election in Illinois
- 1984 United States Senate election in Iowa
- 1984 United States Senate election in Kansas
- 1984 United States Senate election in Kentucky
- 1984 United States Senate election in Louisiana
- 1984 United States Senate election in New Hampshire
- 1984 United States Senate election in North Carolina
- 1984 United States Senate election in Oklahoma
- 1984 United States Senate election in Oregon
- 1984 United States Senate election in South Carolina
- 1984 United States Senate election in South Dakota

==== United States mayoral elections ====
- 1984 Anchorage mayoral election
- 1984 Auburn, Alabama municipal elections
- 1984 Orlando mayoral election
- 1984 Portland, Oregon mayoral election
- 1984 San Diego mayoral election
- 1984 Sioux Falls mayoral election

== South America ==
- 1984 Argentine Beagle conflict dispute resolution referendum
- 1984 Ecuadorian general election
- 1984 Uruguayan general election

== Oceania ==
- 1984 New Zealand general election
- 1984 Niuean general election
- 1984 Palauan general election
- 1984 Solomon Islands general election
- 1984 Tongan general election

=== Australia ===
- 1984 Archerfield state by-election
- 1984 Australian federal election
- 1984 Corangamite by-election
- 1984 Elizabeth state by-election
- 1984 Hughes by-election
- 1984 Jingili by-election
- 1984 New South Wales state election
- 1984 Australian referendum
- 1984 Richmond by-election
- 1984 Stafford state by-election
- 1984 Western Australian daylight saving referendum
