= 1990 Lombard regional election =

The 1990 Lombard regional election took place on 6 and 7 May 1990. The 5th term of the Regional Council was chosen.

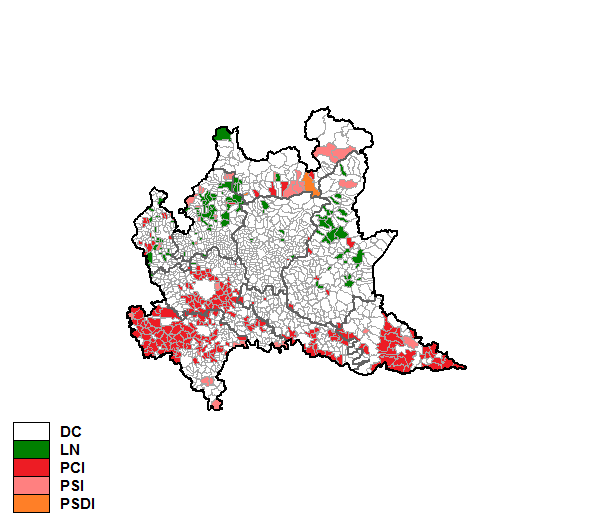
Largest party by municipality

== Electoral law ==
The election was held under proportional representation with provincial constituencies where the largest remainder method with a Droop quota was used. To ensure more proportionality, remained votes and seats were transferred at regional level and calculated at-large.

== Results ==
The Christian Democracy party, which had been the leading political force in the region for twenty years, and the Communist Party lost half million votes each while the Lombard League, a new autonomist party led by Umberto Bossi, obtained a resounding victory, entering the Regional Council with 15 councillors, along with one for the Lombard Alliance, and becoming the second largest party in the region. Since that point the Lombard League became a stable political force in Lombardy.

After the election a cabinet led by the incumbent president Giuseppe Giovenzana was formed but, after the Tangentopoli crisis, it was replaced by a succession of governments which included both Lombard League and the former communist PDS.

6 May 1990 Lombard regional election results
Party	Votes	%	Seats	+/−
Christian Democracy	1,784,634	28.56	25	-6
Lombard League	1,183,493	18.94	15	+15
Italian Communist Party	1,172,059	18.76	15	-7
Italian Socialist Party	892,998	14.29	12	±0
Green List	213,529	3.42	2	±0
Italian Republican Party	160,985	2.58	2	-2
Italian Social Movement	158,614	2.54	2	-2
Pensioners' Party	114,016	1.82	1	+1
Rainbow Greens	113,824	1.82	1	New
Italian Democratic Socialist Party	103,188	1.65	1	-1
Italian Liberal Party	88,308	1.41	1	±0
Lombard Alliance	76,516	1.22	1	New
Proletarian Democracy	73,451	1.18	1	-1
Antiprohibitionists on Drugs	62,356	1.00	1	New
Hunting Fishing Environment	18,834	0.30	0	New
Ecological List	14,774	0.24	0	New
Italian Southerns' List	11,199	0.18	0	New
Italian National Hunting Movement	5,200	0.08	0	New
Total valid votes	6,247,978	100.00	80	
Blank votes	188,011			
Invalid votes (blank included)	372,326			
Total	6,620,304			
Registered voters & turnout	7,258,354	91.21		
Source: Ministry of the Interior

Popular vote (party)
DC	28.56%
LN	18.94%
PCI	18.76%
PSI	14.29%
LV	3.42%
PRI	2.58%
MSI	2.54%
Others	10.91%

Seats
DC	31.25%
LN	18.75%
PCI	18.75%
PSI	15.00%
LV	2.50%
PRI	2.50%
MSI	2.50%
Others	8.75%

=== Seats by province ===
Province	DC	Lega	PCI	PSI	LV+VA	MSI	PRI	PP	Others	Total
Milan	9	5	8	6	3	1	2	1	5	40
Brescia	3	2	1	1	-	1	-	-	-	8
Bergamo	3	2	1	1	-	-	-	-	-	7
Como	3	2	1	1	-	-	-	-	-	7
Varese	2	2	1	1	-	-	-	-	-	6
Pavia	2	1	1	1	-	-	-	-	-	5
Mantua	1	-	1	1	-	-	-	-	-	3
Cremona	1	1	1	-	-	-	-	-	-	3
Sondrio	1	-	-	-	-	-	-	-	-	1
Total	25	15	15	12	3	2	2	1	5	80
