= 1990 Italian regional elections =

← 1985	6–7 May 1990	1995 →

Presidents and regional assemblies of Piedmont, Lombardy, Veneto, Liguria, Emilia-Romagna, Tuscany, Marche, Umbria, Lazio, Campania, Molise, Abruzzo, Apulia, Basilicata and Calabria
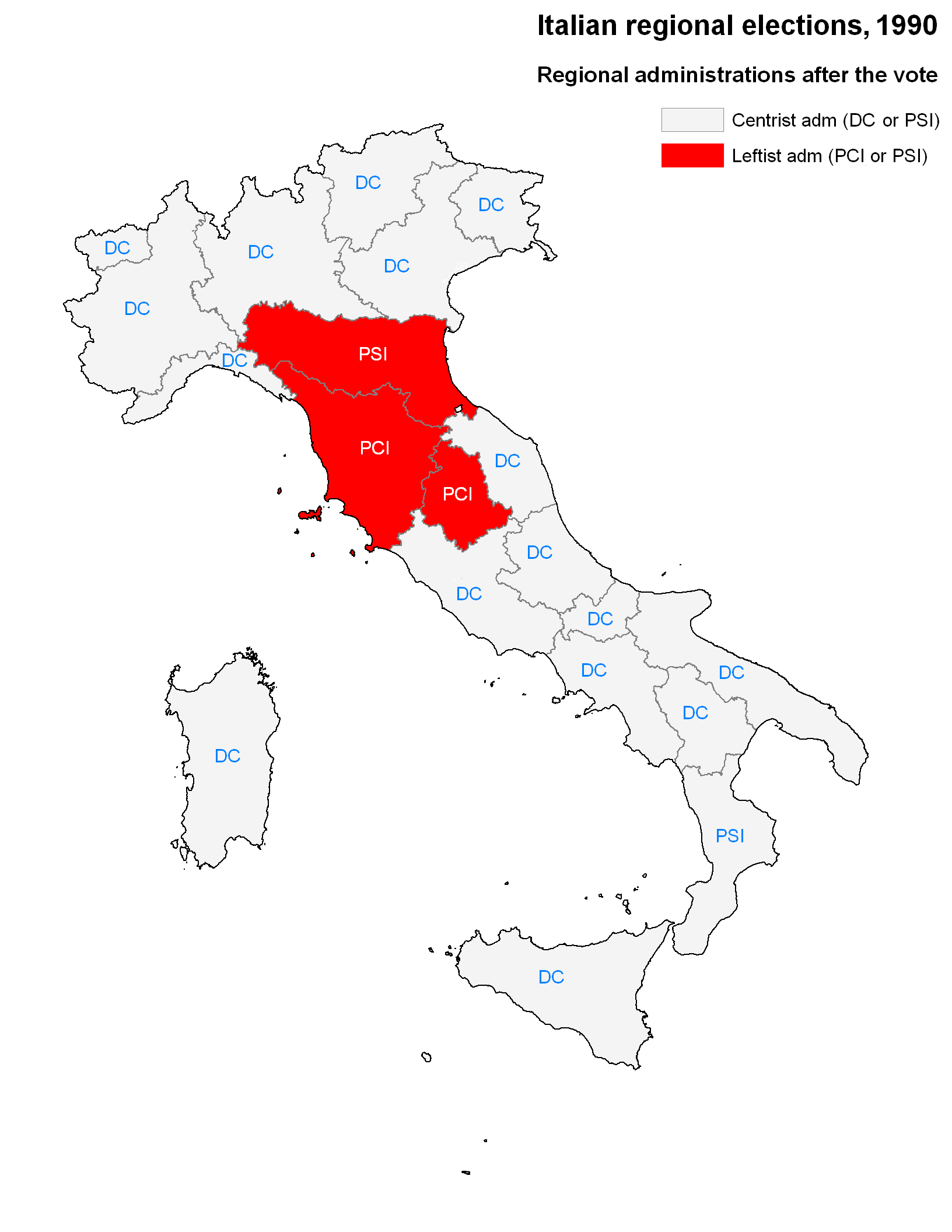

The Italian regional elections of 1990 were held on 6 and 7 May. The fifteen ordinary regions, created in 1970, elected their fifth assemblies.

== Electoral system ==
The pure party-list proportional representation had traditionally become the electoral system of Italy; it was also adopted for the regional vote. Each Italian province corresponded to a constituency, electing a group of candidates. At the constituency level, seats were divided between open lists using the largest remainder method with a Droop quota. The remaining votes and seats were transferred at the regional level, where they were divided using the Hare quota and automatically distributed to the best losers in the local lists.

== Results summary ==
The total summary across all regions was:

Party	votes	votes (%)	seats
Christian Democracy (DC)	10,651,675	33.4	272
Italian Communist Party (PCI)	7,660,553	24.0	182
Italian Socialist Party (PSI)	4,884,179	15.3	113
Northern League (LN)	1,718,467	5.2	24
Italian Social Movement (MSI)	1,246,564	3.9	25
Italian Republican Party (PRI)	1,139,590	3.6	21
Italian Democratic Socialist Party (PSDI)	894,318	2.8	21
Green List (LV)	771,721	2.4	13
Italian Liberal Party (PLI)	630,242	2.0	13
Rainbow Greens (VA)	433,001	1.4	7
Green List–Rainbow Greens (LV–VA)	381,190	1.2	8
Antiprohibitionists on Drugs	336,966	1.0	6
Proletarian Democracy (DP)	308,650	1.0	4
Hunting Fishing Environment (CPA)	237,958	0.8	4
Pensioners' Party (PP)	174,443	0.5	3
Other leagues	563,724	1.8	4
Total	31,915,619	100	720

The Italian political spectrum, which had been quite static since World War II, began to change rapidly. Umberto Bossi's Lega Nord obtained a stunning result in the general election round, making major gains in the Lombard Regional Council to become the second largest party in that council. The Christian Democrats suffered hugely under League pressure in Northern Italy, but counterbalanced these negative results in Southern Italy. Throughout Italy, the Communists lost ground, with revolutions in the Eastern Bloc marking the final decline of the party. Secretary Achille Occhetto understood that an era was finished and prepared the transition of his group to social-democratic ideas.

Despite these changes, all fifteen councils confirmed their respective political administrations. However, margins in Northern Italy were too close to allow stable leadership, beginning a period of fragmentation in those regions. By the time these councils expired in 1995, Italian politics had changed completely.

== Results by region ==
- 1990 Abruzzo regional election
- 1990 Apulian regional election
- 1990 Basilicata regional election
- 1990 Calabrian regional election
- 1990 Campania regional election
- 1990 Emilia-Romagna regional election
- 1990 Lazio regional election
- 1990 Ligurian regional election
- 1990 Lombard regional election
- 1990 Marche regional election
- 1990 Molise regional election
- 1990 Piedmontese regional election
- 1990 Tuscan regional election
- 1990 Umbrian regional election
- 1990 Venetian regional election
