= Giancarlo Pajetta =

Italian communist politician (1911–1990)

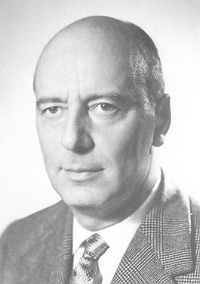

Member of the Chamber of Deputies
- In office 25 June 1946 – 13 September 1990
- Constituency: Turin

Member of the European Parliament
- In office 17 July 1979 – 24 July 1989
- Constituency: North-West Italy

Personal details
- Born: 24 June 1911 Turin, Italy
- Died: 13 September 1990 (aged 79) Rome, Italy
- Party: PCI
- Occupation: Journalist, politician

Giancarlo Pajetta (24 June 1911 – 13 September 1990) was an Italian communist politician.

== Biography ==
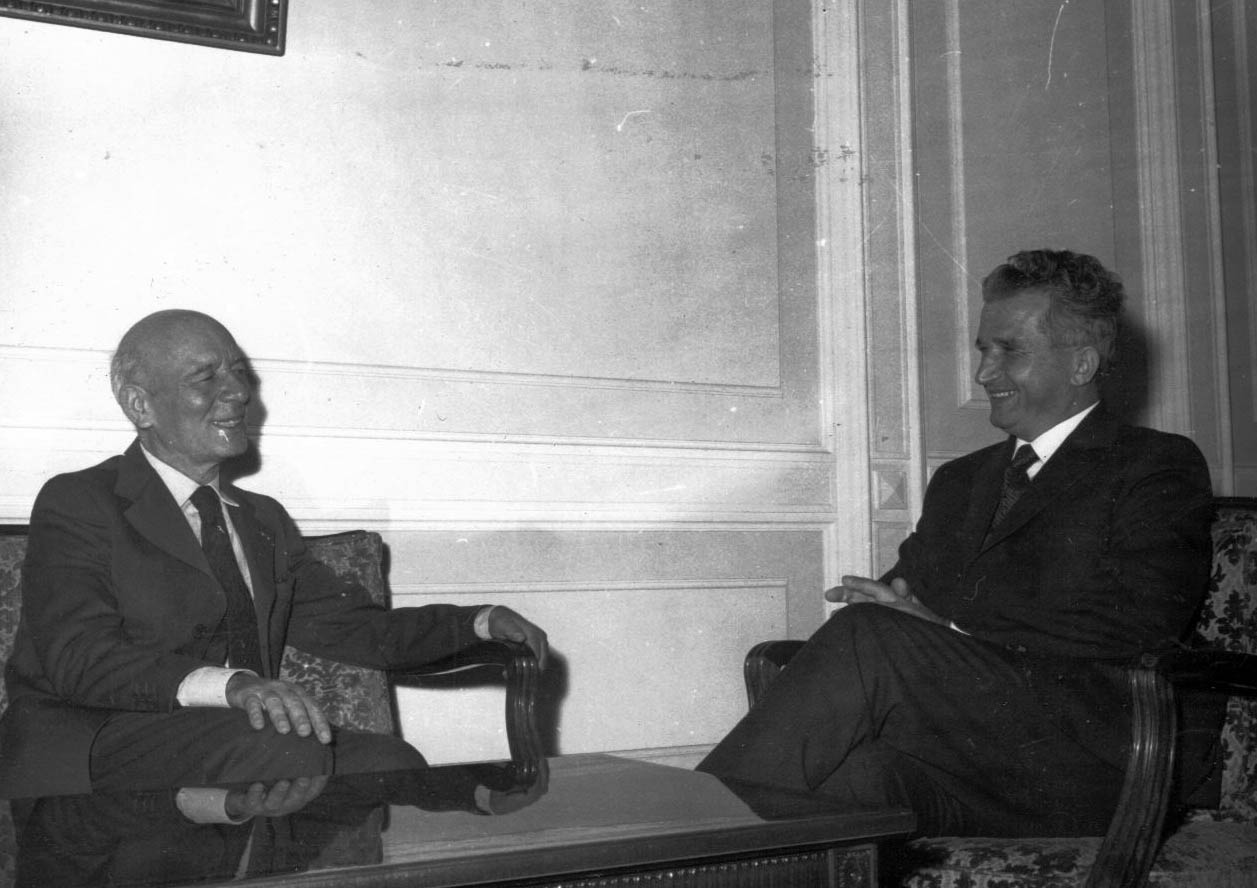
Giancarlo Pajetta with Nicolae Ceauşescu in 1974

Pajetta was born in a working-class district of Turin to Carlo, a bank employee, and Elvira Berrini, an elementary school teacher. He attended Liceo Classico Massimo d'Azeglio for his high school studies and joined the Communist Party of Italy during this time. In 1927 he was sentenced to two years of imprisonment for subversive propaganda, after having distributed anti-fascist leaflets to the workers at the Saroglia typographical workshops. In 1931, he went into exile in France. While in exile he travelled to Moscow several times as a representative of the Italian Communist Youth Federation to the Communist International. He took up the pseudonym Nullo, after 19th century Italian patriot Francesco Nullo.

In 1933, Pajetta returned to Italy in secret, but was arrested and sentenced to 21 years of imprisonment by the Special Tribunal for the Defense of the State. He was freed on 23 August 1943, after the fall of Fascism. He subsequently took part in the early phase of the partisan resistance with the Garibaldi Brigades, of which he was de facto deputy commander. In February 1944, together with Ferruccio Parri and Alfredo Pizzoni, he was part of the delegation of the National Liberation Committee (CLN) that sought recognition from the Allies as the legitimate government authority in occupied Italy. After this, he remained in the Allied-controlled South.

Pajetta was elected to the Constituent Assembly in 1946 and then was a deputy in the lower house of the Italian Parliament from 1948 until his death. He was also elected to the European Parliament in 1979 and 1984. From 1948 to 1985 he was a member of the National Secretariat of the Italian Communist Party (PCI), at first with responsibility for international relationships. He was briefly director of the party newspaper L'Unità, in 1947 and from 1969 to 1970, and of the Marxist periodical Rinascita, from 1964 to 1966.

In 1947, Pajetta took part in the armed occupation of the prefecture of Milan, in protest for the removal of prefect Ettore Troilo. Pajetta was one of the most respected Communist politicians after World War II. Following the death of secretary Enrico Berlinguer in 1984, Pajetta was considered too old to succeed him. He later opposed Achille Occhetto's project of transforming the PCI into a social-democratic party. Pajetta died suddenly in Rome in September 1990, before the dissolution of the PCI. His funeral ceremony was attended by 200,000 people.

== Bibliography ==
- Le crisi che ho vissuto (1982)
- Il ragazzo rosso (1983, autobiography)
- Il ragazzo rosso va alla guerra (1986)
