= 1985 Italian regional elections =

← 1980	12–13 May 1985	1990 →

Presidents and regional assemblies of Piedmont, Lombardy, Veneto, Liguria, Emilia-Romagna, Tuscany, Marche, Umbria, Lazio, Campania, Molise, Abruzzo, Apulia, Basilicata and Calabria
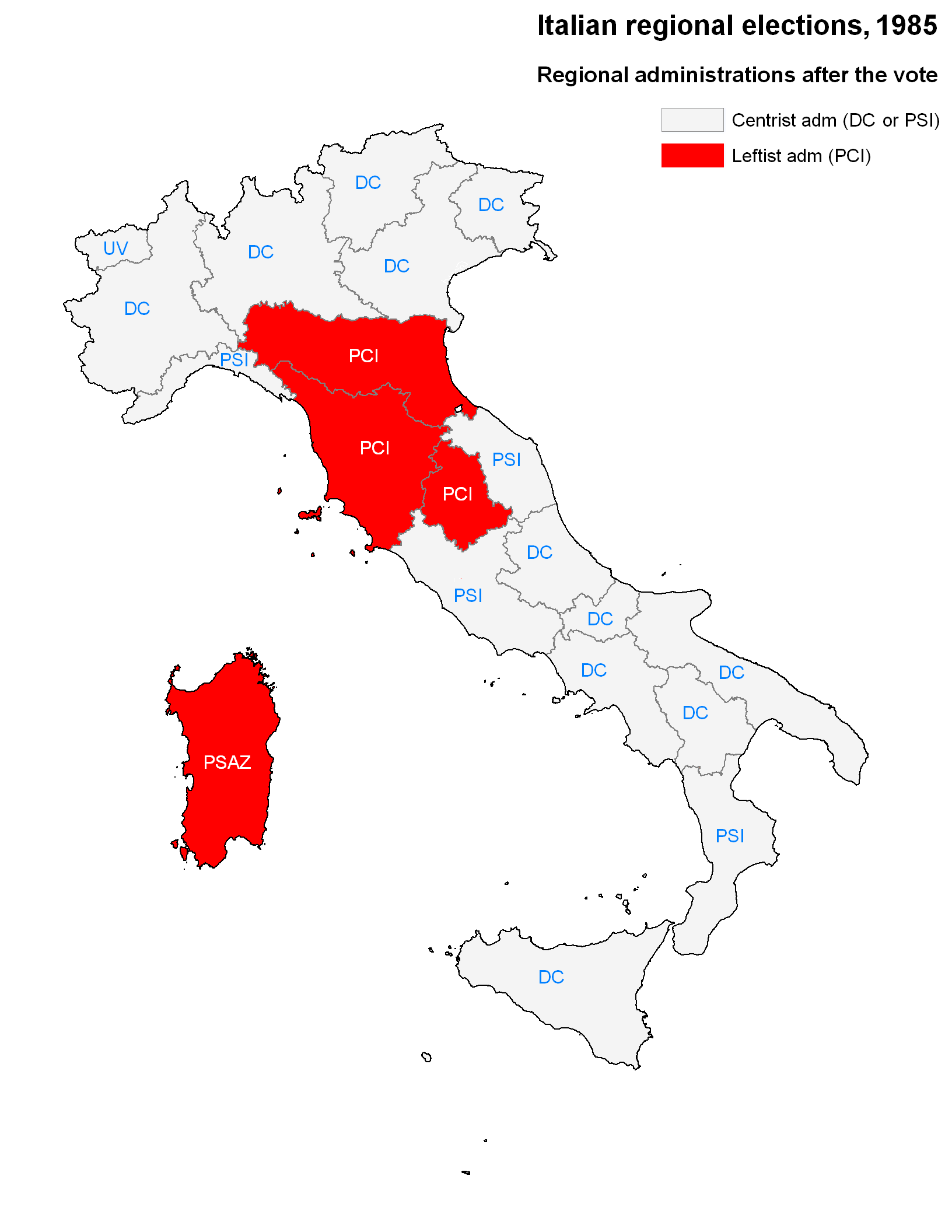

The Italian regional elections of 1985 were held on 12 and 13 May. The fifteen ordinary regions, created in 1970, elected their fourth assemblies.

== Electoral system ==
The pure party-list proportional representation had traditionally become the electoral system of Italy, and it was adopted for the regional vote too. Each Italian province corresponded to a constituency electing a group of candidates. At constituency level, seats were divided between open lists using the largest remainder method with Droop quota. Remaining votes and seats were transferred at regional level, where they were divided using the Hare quota, and automatically distributed to best losers into the local lists.

== Results summary ==
Party	votes	votes (%)	seats
Christian Democracy (DC)	11,223,284	35.0	276
Italian Communist Party (PCI)	9,686,140	30.2	225
Italian Socialist Party (PSI)	4,267,959	13.3	94
Italian Social Movement (MSI)	2,087,404	6.5	41
Italian Republican Party (PRI)	1,280,563	4.0	25
Italian Democratic Socialist Party (PSDI)	1,150,788	3.6	23
Italian Liberal Party (PLI)	702,273	2.2	13
Federation of Green Lists (FLV)	648,832	2.1	11
Proletarian Democracy (DP)	470,626	1.5	9
Venetian League (ŁV)	266,909	0.9	3
Others	246,336	0.7	-
Total		100.00	

The most relevant result of these elections was the switch of Piedmont, which returned to the Christian Democracy after ten year of leftist administration. If the vote weakened both two major parties, the DC could compensate its loss with the reinforcement of its national allies, while the Communists became increasingly isolated, with Craxi's Socialists looking definitely at their right. Twelve Regional Councils elected a centrist administration, with the PSI rewarded by four presidencies, while the PCI was confined to its traditional strongholds: Emilia-Romagna, Tuscany and Umbria.

The results strengthened Craxi's government after the alarming results of the 1984 European election, and they underlined the decline of the Communist party into a progressively post-industrial Italy.

== Results by region ==
- 1985 Abruzzo regional election
- 1985 Apulian regional election
- 1985 Basilicata regional election
- 1985 Calabrian regional election
- 1985 Campania regional election
- 1985 Emilia-Romagna regional election
- 1985 Lazio regional election
- 1985 Ligurian regional election
- 1985 Lombard regional election
- 1985 Marche regional election
- 1985 Molise regional election
- 1985 Piedmontese regional election
- 1985 Tuscan regional election
- 1985 Umbrian regional election
- 1985 Venetian regional election
