= Arnaboldi =

Arnaboldi may refer to:

== People ==
- Andrea Arnaboldi (born 1987), Italian tennis player
- Federico Arnaboldi (born 2000), Italian tennis player
- Letizia Brichetto-Arnaboldi (born 1949), Italian businesswoman and former politician
- Patrizia Arnaboldi (1946–2025), Italian politician

== Places ==
- Albaredo Arnaboldi, comune in Italy
