= Gloria Grosso =

Italian politician (born 1936)

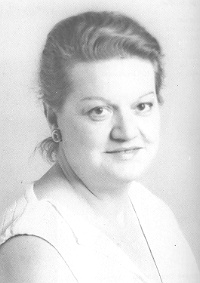

Member of the Chamber of Deputies
- In office 29 June 1987 – 22 April 1992

Personal details
- Born: 9 April 1936 (age 89) Colleferro, Kingdom of Italy
- Party: Federation of Green Lists; Italian Democratic Socialist Party

Gloria Grosso Romero (born 9 April 1936) is an Italian former politician. She was a member of the Chamber of Deputies from 1987 to 1992, representing the Federation of Green Lists and the Italian Democratic Socialist Party.

== Early life ==
Grosso was born on 9 April 1936 in Colleferro in Rome. She began working as a primary school teacher. She was a founder and national president of the League for the Abolition of Hunting and the first signatory of a referendum against hunting. She was a member of the provincial council of Milan for the Federation of Green Lists from 1985, where she achieved the end of bird-shooting in the province.

== Political career ==
Grosso was elected to the Chamber of Deputies on 29 June 1987 with the Federation of Green Lists as a representative for Milan-Pavia. She served as vice chair of the labour committee between 9 January 1991 and 22 April 1992 and as vice chair of the agriculture committee between 16 October 1991 and 22 April 1992. In April 1990 she switched parties to the Italian Democratic Socialist Party. She left office on 22 April 1992.
