= Emilio Molinari =

Italian politician (1939–2025)

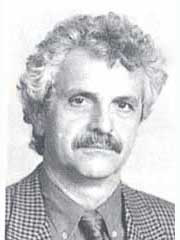

Member of the European Parliament
- In office 24 July 1984 – 2 September 1985
- Constituency: Italy

Personal details
- Born: 12 November 1939 Milan, Italy
- Died: 5 July 2025 (aged 85)
- Party: Proletarian Democracy
- Occupation: Politician

Emilio Molinari (12 November 1939 – 5 July 2025) was an Italian politician. From 1984 to 1985, he served as a Member of the European Parliament, representing Italy for Proletarian Democracy. From 1992 to 1994, he served as a Senator, representing Lombardy for the Federation of the Greens.

Molinari died on 5 July 2025, at the age of 85.
