= 1985 Marche regional election =

The Marche regional election of 1985 took place on 12 May 1985.

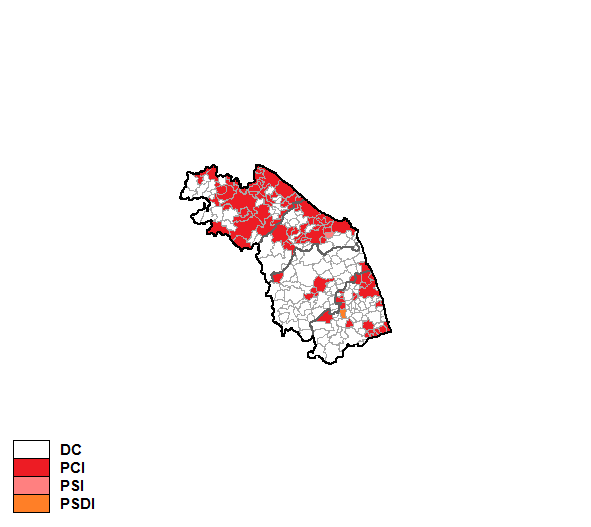
Largest party by municipality

== Events ==
Christian Democracy was the largest party, narrowly ahead of the Italian Communist Party. After the election Emidio Massi, the incumbent Christian Democratic President, formed a new government including also the Italian Socialist Party, the Italian Democratic Socialist Party and the Italian Republican Party (organic Centre-left).

== Results ==
Parties	votes	votes (%)	seats
Christian Democracy	359,314	36.1	15
Italian Communist Party	355,232	35.7	15
Italian Socialist Party	104,587	10.5	4
Italian Social Movement	55,280	5.6	2
Italian Republican Party	36,639	3.7	1
Italian Democratic Socialist Party	32,439	3.3	1
Green List	22,314	2.2	1
Italian Liberal Party	11,772	1.2	1
Proletarian Democracy	10,136	1.0	-
Pensioners Italian Alliance – Venetian League	5,433	0.6	-
Valdostan Union – Democratic Party – others	2,069	0.2	-
Total	995,215	100.0	40

Source: Ministry of the Interior
