= Microparty =

Term for a small political party

Microparty, micro-party, or micro party is a term, sometimes pejorative, for a small political party that does not attract enough votes to be elected to a legislature in its own right. The term is most commonly used in Australia where the combination of single transferable vote (also known as preferential or alternative voting) and group voting tickets enabled microparties to direct preferences to each other, so that one of them could well be elected even when each party individually attracted very few primary votes.

== History and background ==
Australian voters have historically elected independents and candidates from smaller parties to the Australian Senate and the upper houses of Australian states and territories. For example, Brian Harradine was an independent Senator for Tasmania for thirty years from 1975 to 2005.

=== Group voting tickets ===
Upper house elections have attracted a large number of candidates, and until the 1980s voters had to number every box in sequence on a large ballot paper. It was difficult to complete successfully, and informal votes were commonly around ten percent.

The Hawke government introduced group voting tickets (GVTs) for the Senate 1984 election. Political parties submitted a complete ticket before the election, and voters simply wrote a 1 above the line to select that party's ticket. Once "above the line" voting was introduced, the vast majority of voters used it – usually around 95 percent.

Group voting meant political parties chose preferences, and not voters. The effect was to amplify the effectiveness of preference deals between parties. Instead of just giving guidance to their supporters in a how-to-vote card, they could control the allocation of preferences.

GVTs encouraged the formation of single-issue microparties, who harvested votes and then distributed preferences, often to destinations their voters might not have expected. As the number of microparties increased, the ballot paper got bigger and more daunting, increasing the likelihood that a voter would vote above the line.

=== Minor Party Alliance ===
If all microparties preference each other despite policy differences, it becomes possible one of them will be elected, although which one can be hard to predict.

Glenn Druery, known as the "preference whisperer", organised the Minor Party Alliance, a network of microparties that agreed to preference each other. The alliance first operated in the 1999 New South Wales state election. Wilson Tucker was elected in 2021 with 98 primary votes as a result of one of Druery's deals: it is believed to be the lowest primary vote for any candidate elected to an Australian parliament.

David Leyonhjelm was elected to the Australian Senate in 2014 as a candidate of the Liberal Democrats. He benefited from preferences from the Smokers' Rights Party, Outdoor Recreation Party and Republican Party of Australia; he was an official or adviser to all three.

== List of successful microparty candidates ==
The following candidates have been elected to Australian legislatures from primary votes under 2%.

Name	Party	Year	Legislature	Primary vote
Malcolm Jones	Outdoor Recreation Party	1999	NSW	0.19%
Peter Breen	Reform the Legal System	1999	NSW	1.00%
Steve Fielding	Family First	2004	Senate	1.9%
Wayne Dropulich (Note: Although Dropulich was elected upon a recount of ballots, the Western Australian Senate election results were declared void and re-run in 2014. Dropulich did not win a seat.)	Australian Sports Party	2013	Senate	0.02%
Ricky Muir	Australian Motoring Enthusiast Party	2013	Senate	0.51%
James Purcell	Vote 1 Local Jobs	2014	Victoria	1.26%
Rod Barton	Transport Matters Party	2018	Victoria	0.62%
Clifford Hayes	Sustainable Australia	2018	Victoria	1.26%
David Limbrick	Liberal Democratic Party	2018	Victoria	0.84%
Wilson Tucker	Daylight Saving Party	2021	WA	0.18%
