= 1979 European Parliament election in Italy =

- 10 June 1979
- All 81 Italian seats to the European Parliament
- Turnout: 85.7%
Party	Leader	Vote %	Seats
DC	Benigno Zaccagnini	36.5%	29
PCI	Enrico Berlinguer	29.6%	24
PSI	Bettino Craxi	11.0%	9
MSI	Giorgio Almirante	5.5%	4
PSDI	Pietro Longo	4.3%	4
PR	Marco Pannella	3.7%	3
PLI	Valerio Zanone	3.6%	3
PRI	Oddo Biasini	2.6%	2
PdUP	Luciana Castellina	1.2%	1
DP	Mario Capanna	0.7%	1
SVP	Silvius Magnago	0.6%	1
This lists parties that won seats. See the complete results below.
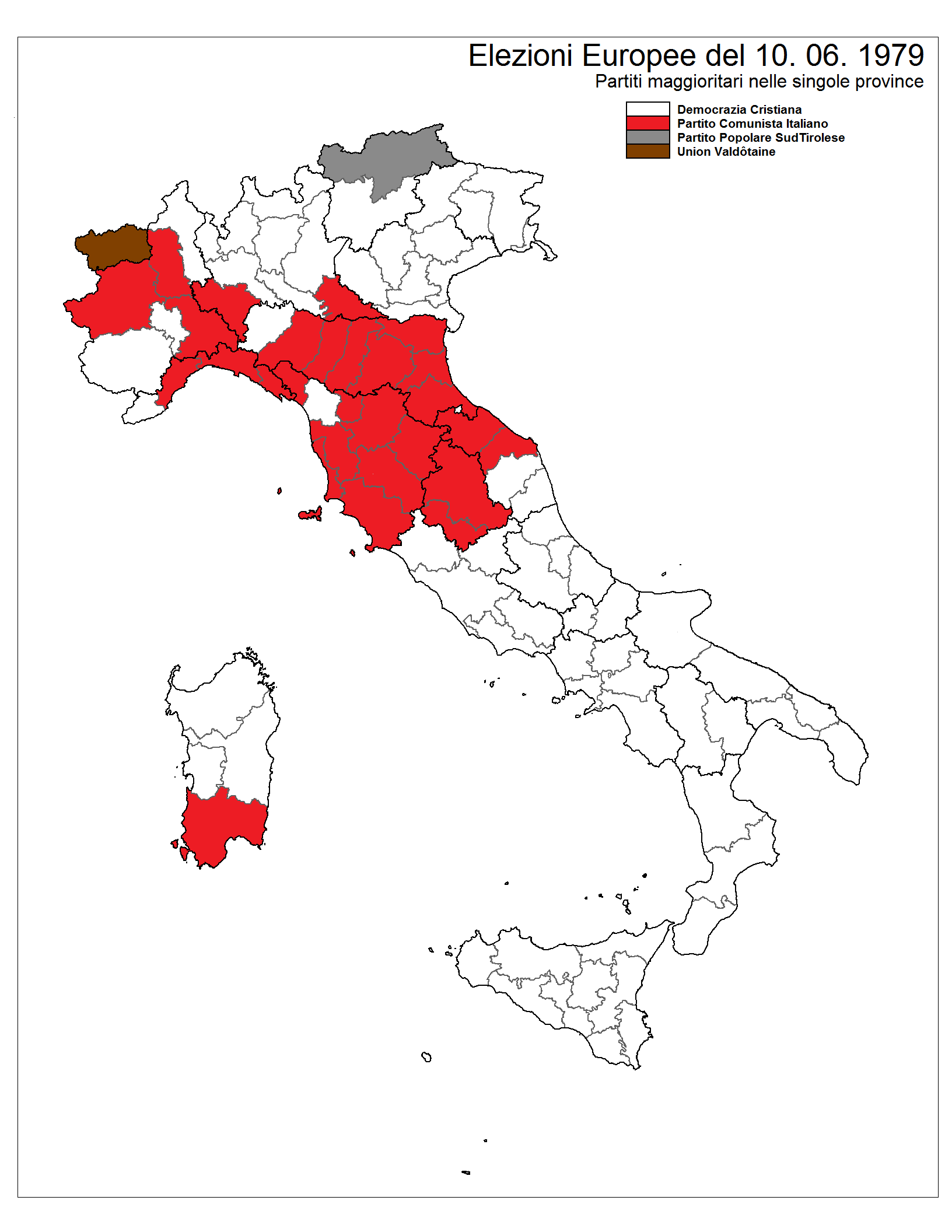
Major party in each province

The 1979 European Parliament election in Italy was held on 10 June 1979. As the 1979 Italian general election was held on 3 June, just a week before, the lack of matching between the two elections caused much controversy for wasting public money.

== Electoral system ==
The pure party-list proportional representation was the traditional electoral system of the Italian Republic since its foundation in 1946, so it was naturally adopted to elect the Italian representatives to the European Parliament. Two levels were used: a national level to divide seats between parties, and a constituency level to distribute them between candidates. Italian regions were united in 5 constituencies, each electing a group of deputies. At national level, seats were divided between party lists using the largest remainder method with Hare quota. All seats gained by each party were automatically distributed to their local open lists and their most voted candidates.

=== Constituencies ===
Seats are allocated to party lists on a national basis using an electoral quota, with the residue given to the lists with the largest excess over whole quotas. An electoral quota is then calculated for each list and used to allocate seats to each list in each of the five electoral regions.

Electoral Region	Administrative Regions	Seats
North-West	Aosta Valley, Liguria, Lombardy, Piedmont	25
North-East	Emilia-Romagna, Friuli-Venezia Giulia, Trentino-Alto Adige/Südtirol, Veneto	17
Central	Latium, Marche, Tuscany, Umbria	17
Southern	Abruzzo, Apulia, Basilicata, Calabria, Campania, Molise	15
Islands	Sardinia, Sicily	7

== Results ==
As the election took place just a week after the general election, it gave a similar result; however, the minor importance of the European ballot caused a lower turnout, which particularly punished the two major parties, Christian Democracy (DC) and the Italian Communist Party (PCI). The small Italian Liberal Party (PLI) had a breath of fresh air from this vote, doubling its percentage compared to seven days before.

Summary of 10 June 1979 European Parliament election results in Italy →
National party	EP group	Votes	%	Seats
Christian Democracy (DC)	EPP	12,774,320	36.45	29
Italian Communist Party (PCI)	COM	10,361,344	29.57	24
Italian Socialist Party (PSI)	SOC	3,866,946	11.03	9
Italian Social Movement (MSI)	NI	1,909,055	5.45	4
Italian Democratic Socialist Party (PSDI)	SOC	1,514,272	4.32	4
Radical Party (PR)	TGI	1,285,065	3.67	3
Italian Liberal Party (PLI)	LD	1,271,159	3.63	3
Italian Republican Party (PRI)	LD	896,139	2.56	2
Proletarian Unity Party (PdUP)	TGI	406,656	1.16	1
Proletarian Democracy (DP)	TGI	252,342	0.72	1
South Tyrolean People's Party (SVP)	EPP	196,373	0.56	1
Federalism (Valdostan Union–Others)	None	166,393	0.47	0
National Democracy (DN)	None	142,537	0.41	0
Valid votes		35,042,601	96.94	
Blank and invalid votes		1,105,579	3.06	
Totals		36,148,180	100.00	81
Electorate (eligible voters) and voter turnout	42,203,405	85.65	—	

Popular vote
DC	36.45%
PCI	29.57%
PSI	11.03%
MSI	5.45%
PSDI	4.32%
PR	3.67%
PLI	3.63%
PRI	2.56%
PdUP	1.16%
Others	2.16%
