= Patrizia Arnaboldi =

Italian politician (1946–2025)

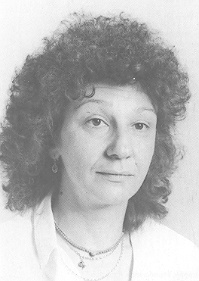

Member of the Chamber of Deputies
- In office 2 July 1987 – 22 April 1992
- Constituency: Lombardy

Personal details
- Born: 27 November 1946; Milan, Italy
- Died: 1 July 2025 (aged 78); Milan, Italy
- Political party: PdUP (until 1978); DP (1978–1991); PRC (1991–2025)
- Spouse: Mario Capanna (m. 1987)

Patrizia Arnaboldi (27 November 1946 – 1 July 2025) was an Italian politician. Coming from the Proletarian Unity Party, in the 1980s she was part of the national leadership of Proletarian Democracy, where she ran for regional councilor in the 1985 Lombard regional election, receiving 2008 votes but was not elected.

== Career ==
In 1987, she was elected to the Chamber of Deputies for the 10th Legislature. In Montecitorio, she was a member of the presidency bureau and also served as group leader from July 1989 to July 1991; she was also a member of the Committee on Culture, Science, and Education. After the dissolution of DP, she joined the Rifondazione Comunista, a party of which she remained a member until the end of her life. Together with other women in the party, she experimented with spaces and practices of gender autonomy, giving life to the PRC Women's Forum. In Lombardy she served for years as President of the PRC Regional Guarantee Board. She was also the coordinator of the Communist Refoundation Party Rosa Luxemburg circle in Milan.

== Personal life and death ==
Arnaboldi was married to the leader of the Democratic Party Mario Capanna.

Arnaboldi died in Milan on 1 July 2025, at the age of 78.
