= Else Hammerich =

Danish politician (1936–2021)

Else Hammerich MEP

Member of the European Parliament
- In office 1979–1989
- Constituency: Denmark

Personal details
- Born: 7 September 1936 Frederiksberg, Denmark
- Died: 20 March 2021 (aged 84)
- Party: People's Movement against the EU

Else Hammerich (7 September 1936 – 20 March 2021) was a Danish politician who served as a Member of the European Parliament from 1979 to 1989. A member of the protest movement People's Movement against the EU, she was elected to the European Parliament for this association.

== Early and personal life ==
Born in Frederiksberg, Hammerich was the seventh of eight children, a daughter of naval officer Kai Hammerich and Valborg Rump. The family was involved in the resistance movement during World War II; one of her brothers was killed by the Gestapo. She attended school primarily in Gentofte, but spent a year in a Catholic school in Tokyo while her parents were overseas providing humanitarian aid during the Korean War.

She was married to Per Bethlowsky Rasmussen from 1958 to 1968, and to lecturer Søren Laurits Højmark-Jensen from 1977 to 1987.

== Career ==
Hammerich became a special education teacher after graduation. As her teaching career began, she also began to get involved in politics, and was part of the grassroots campaign in protest of nuclear weapons. She was married in 1958, and had three children before being divorced a decade later; after the marriage ended she continued her teaching education, and graduated from Danmarks Lærerhøjskole (Denmark School of Education). In 1971, she joined the Blaagaard Seminarium, and served as a faculty member there until 1978. She also joined the People's Movement against the EU upon its inception in 1972, but stayed politically independent in regard to Denmark's parties; she felt that the European Union was contradictory to the anti-nuclear movement that she supported.

In 1979, Hammerich ran for the European Parliament, winning a seat, her association, Folkebevægelsen mod EF, won a total of four delegates. She aligned herself with the Technical Group of Independents, and became chairperson near the end of the five-year term. She ran for re-election in 1984, and then served as chairperson of the Rainbow Group in parliament. She served as a member of the Political Affairs Committee from 1984 to 1987, and was thereafter member of the Committee on the Environment, Public Health and Consumer Protection. She focused on human rights during the military dictatorship of Chile, and on the Chilean women's resistance. She retired from politics after her term ended in 1989, finding the parties to be too polarized. She went on to co-found the Center for Conflict Resolution in 1994, serving as leader of the centre until 1998, and continued to work for the centre after stepping down as leader.

Hammerich died on 20 March 2021, at the age of 84.

== Selected works ==
- Rapport fra et skoleår : overvejelser, handlinger og hændelser. Copenhagen: Unge Pædagoger. 1977. ISBN 9788787400183. OCLC 3668980. (With Mette Bugge, Lotte Kærsaa and Karin Vilien).
- Grænser for fællesskab : en bog om social sortering i folkeskolen og dens materielle årsager i lokalsamfundet. Copenhagen: Unge Pædagoger. 1979. ISBN 9788787400329. OCLC 873438505. (With Liselotte Taarup).
- Børn og moral : hvad opdrages vore børn til?. Copenhagen: Danmarks Demokratiske Kvindeforbund. 1979. ISBN 9788798079309. OCLC 872150941. (With Spæt Henriksen and Ruth Hougaard).
- Det fik vi gjort (Folkebevægelsen i EF-parlamentet 1984-89). Regnbuegruppen i EF-parlamentet, Folkebevægelsen mod EF. 1988. ISBN 9788787586368. OCLC 463915365. (editor)
- Harens mod : stillehavsriget Palau, et eksempel på vor tids imperialisme. Valby: Vindrose. 1990. ISBN 9788774563785. OCLC 858630375. (With Lisbet Bendix).
- Vestunionen. Copenhagen: Fremad. 1991. ISBN 9788755716865. OCLC 894350597. (With Uffe Ellemann-Jensen and Frede P Jensen).
