= 1989 European Parliament election in Italy =

- 18 June 1989
- All 81 Italian seats to the European Parliament
- Turnout: 81.07% (▼1.4 pp)
Party	Leader	Vote %	Seats	+/–
DC	Arnaldo Forlani	32.9%	26	0
PCI	Achille Occhetto	27.6%	22	−5
PSI	Bettino Craxi	14.8%	12	+3
MSI	Gianfranco Fini	5.5%	4	−1
PLI–PRI–Fed.	R. Altissimo, G. La Malfa & M. Pannella	4.4%	4	−1
Green List	Gianni F. Mattioli	3.8%	3	New
PSDI	Antonio Cariglia	2.7%	2	−1
Rainbow Greens	Mario Capanna	2.4%	2	New
Lega Lombarda	Umberto Bossi	1.8%	2	+2
DP	Giovanni Russo Spena	1.3%	1	0
Antiprohibitionists	Marco Taradash	1.2%	1	−2
PSd'Az – others	Collective leadership	0.6%	1	0
SVP	Silvius Magnago	0.5%	1	0
This lists parties that won seats. See the complete results below.
Result by leading party in each province

The 1989 European Parliament election in Italy was held on 18 June 1989. The election was paired with 1989 Italian advisory referendum, a non-binding referendum about the devolution of powers to the European Economic Community (EEC), which passed with overwhelming support from voters.

== Electoral system ==
The pure party-list proportional representation was the traditional electoral system of the Italian Republic since its foundation in 1946, so it had been adopted to elect the Italian representatives to the European Parliament too. Two levels were used: a national level to divide seats between parties, and a constituency level to distribute them between candidates. Italian regions were united in 5 constituencies, each electing a group of deputies. At national level, seats were divided between party lists using the largest remainder method with Hare quota. All seats gained by each party were automatically distributed to their local open lists and their most voted candidates.

=== Constituencies ===
Seats are allocated to party lists on a national basis using an electoral quota, with the residue given to the lists with the largest excess over whole quotas. An electoral quota is then calculated for each list and used to allocate seats to each list in each of the five electoral regions.

Electoral Region	Administrative Regions	Seats
North-West	Aosta Valley, Liguria, Lombardy, Piedmont	25
North-East	Emilia-Romagna, Friuli-Venezia Giulia, Trentino-Alto Adige/Südtirol, Veneto	17
Central	Latium, Marche, Tuscany, Umbria	16
Southern	Abruzzo, Apulia, Basilicata, Calabria, Campania, Molise	16
Islands	Sardinia, Sicily	7

== Results ==
For more than 35 years, the Italian Communist Party (PCI) had thought that their final victory was no more than a matter of time; however, the deindustrialization of Italy during the 1980s showed that the time had expired. The decline of the traditional opponents of Christian Democracy (DC) opened the door to new forms of protests: the Federation of Green Lists (LV) and the Lombard League (LL) in Northern Italy. The government of Ciriaco De Mita did not survive to this vote. The declining Italian Republican Party (PRI) fired its leader Giovanni Spadolini, and the new secretary Giorgio La Malfa retired his support to De Mita. The DC chose Giulio Andreotti as the new prime minister.

← Summary of the 18 June 1989 European Parliament election results in Italy →
National party	Votes	%	+/–	Seats	+/–
Christian Democracy (DC)	11,451,053	32.90	0.06 ▼	26	0
Italian Communist Party (PCI)	9,598,369	27.58	5.75 ▼	22	5 ▼
Italian Socialist Party (PSI)	5,151,929	14.80	3.59 ▲	12	3 ▲
Italian Social Movement (MSI)	1,918,650	5.51	0.96 ▼	4	1 ▼
Liberals – Republicans – Federalists (PLI–PRI–FED)	1,532,388	4.40	1.69 ▼	4	1 ▼
Federation of Green Lists (FLV)	1,317,119	3.78	New	3	New
Italian Democratic Socialist Party (PSDI)	945,383	2.72	0.77 ▼	2	1 ▼
Rainbow Greens (VA)	830,980	2.39	New	2	New
Lombard League – Northern Alliance (LL–AN)	636,242	1.83	1.36 ▲	2	2 ▲
Proletarian Democracy (DP)	449,639	1.29	0.15 ▼	1	0
Antiprohibitionists on Drugs	430,150	1.24	2.43 ▼	1	2 ▼
Federalism (PSd'Az–UV–MF–UfS–UPV–SSK)	207,739	0.60	0.05 ▲	1	0
South Tyrolean People's Party (SVP)	172,383	0.50	0.06 ▼	1	0
Pensioners' Party (PP)	162,293	0.47	New	0	New
Valid votes	34.804.317	92.63			
Blank and invalid votes	2,768,442	7.37			
Totals	37,572,759	100.00	—	81	0
Electorate (eligible voters) and voter turnout	46,346,961	81.07	1.40 ▼		
Source: Ministry of the Interior

Popular vote
DC	32.90%
PCI	27.58%
PSI	14.80%
MSI	5.51%
PLI-PRI	4.40%
Greens	2.79%
PSDI	2.72%
Rainbow Greens	2.39%
Others	5.93%

=== Distribution by European group ===
European Parliament group	Seats	National party	Seats
European People's Party Group	27 / 81	Christian Democracy (DC)	26
European People's Party Group	27 / 81	South Tyrolean People's Party (SVP)	1
European United Left	22 / 81	Italian Communist Party (PCI)	22
Socialist Group	14 / 81	Italian Socialist Party (PSI)	12
Socialist Group	14 / 81	Italian Democratic Socialist Party (PSDI)	2
The Green Group in the European Parliament	7 / 81	Federation of Green Lists (FLV)	3
The Green Group in the European Parliament	7 / 81	Rainbow Greens (VA)	2
The Green Group in the European Parliament	7 / 81	Proletarian Democracy (DP)	1
The Green Group in the European Parliament	7 / 81	Antiprohibitionists on Drugs	1
Liberal and Democratic Reformist Group	3 / 81	Italian Republican Party (PRI)	3
Rainbow Group	3 / 81	Lombard League (LL)	2
Rainbow Group	3 / 81	Sardinian Action Party (PSd'Az)	1
Non-Inscrits	5 / 81	Italian Social Movement (MSI)	4
Non-Inscrits	5 / 81	Lay Pole (Independent)	1

== See also ==
- European Parliament
