= 1984 European Parliament election in Sardinia =

The European Parliament election of 1984 took place on 17 June 1984.

The Italian Communist Party was narrowly ahead of Christian Democracy in Sardinia. The Sardinian Action Party had a surprisingly good result and was able to elect Mario Melis to the European Parliament in the Islands constituency, thanks to an alliance with several regionalist parties notably including the Valdostan Union, the Trentino Tyrolean People's Party and Liga Veneta.

== Results ==
Parties	votes	votes (%)
Italian Communist Party	296,908	32.5
Christian Democracy	284,409	31.2
Sardinian Action Party	115,885	12.7
Italian Socialist Party	73,509	8.1
Italian Social Movement	46,499	5.1
Radical Party	34,459	3.8
Italian Democratic Socialist Party	28,804	3.2
Italian Republican Party–Italian Liberal Party	21,900	2.4
Proletarian Democracy	8,951	1.0
Others	1,093	0.1
Total	912,417	100.0

Source: Ministry of the Interior

== See also ==
- 1984 European Parliament election in Italy
