= Paolo Inselvini =

Italian politician (born 1994)

Paolo Inselvini MEP
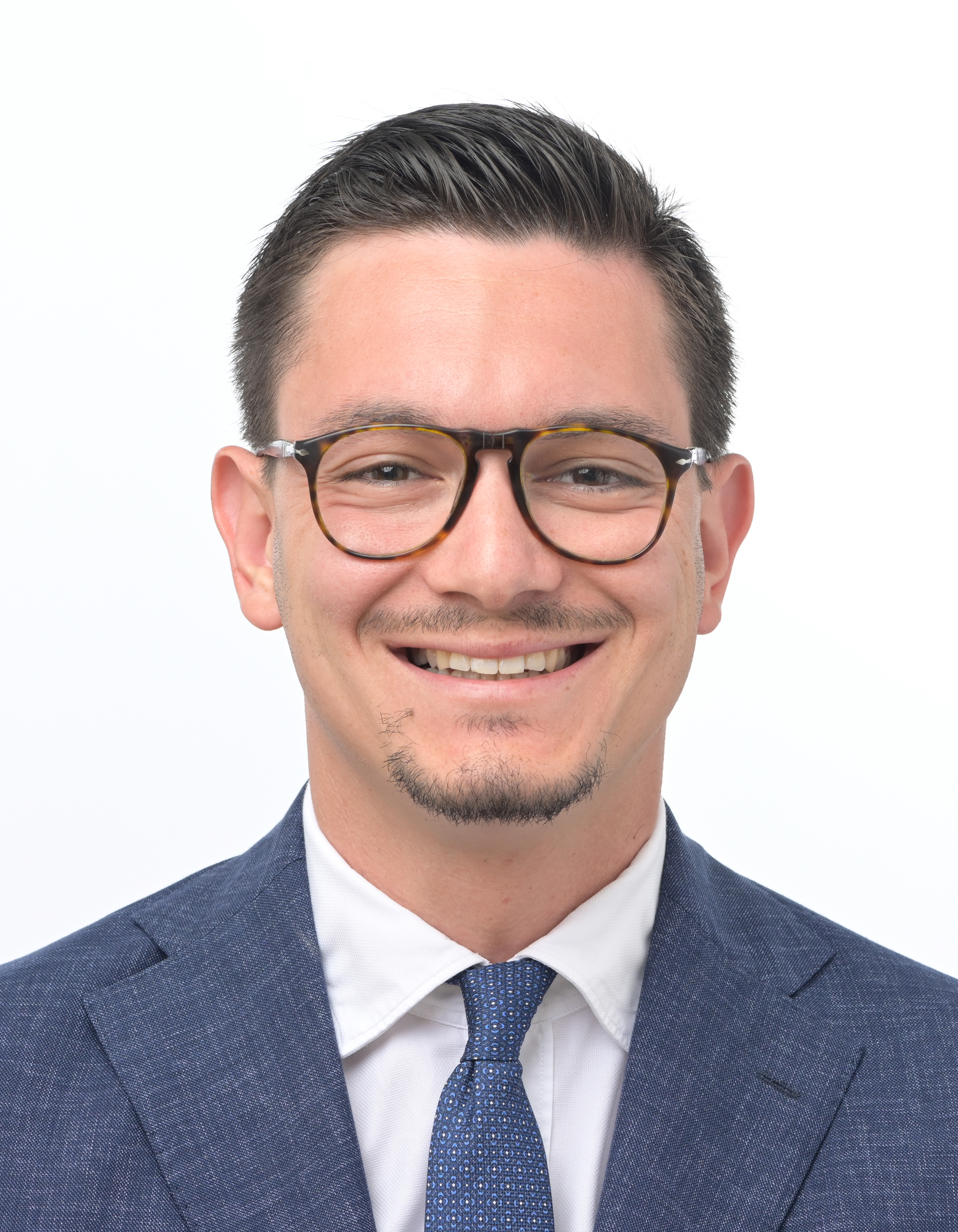

Member of the European Parliament
- Incumbent
- Assumed office 16 July 2024
- Constituency: North-West Italy

Personal details
- Born: 5 October 1994 (age 31) Brescia, Italy
- Party: Brothers of Italy
- Other political affiliations: European Conservatives and Reformists Party
- Education: University of Brescia
- Website: MEPs

Paolo Inselvini (born 5 October 1994) is an Italian politician who was elected a Member of the European Parliament (MEP) in 2024. A member of Brothers of Italy (FdI), he sits with the European Conservatives and Reformists (ECR).

== Early life and career ==
Inselvini was born in Brescia. He joined Brothers of Italy in 2013. He was named leader of the party in Brescia in 2020, and was a candidate for the Chamber of Deputies in Lombardy 3 - 02 in the 2022 election. He is the current president of the National Youth in Lombardy.
