= 1984 United States House of Representatives elections in Rhode Island =

1984 United States House of Representatives election in Rhode Island
- November 6, 1984
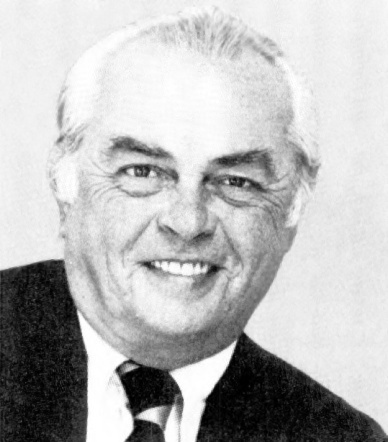

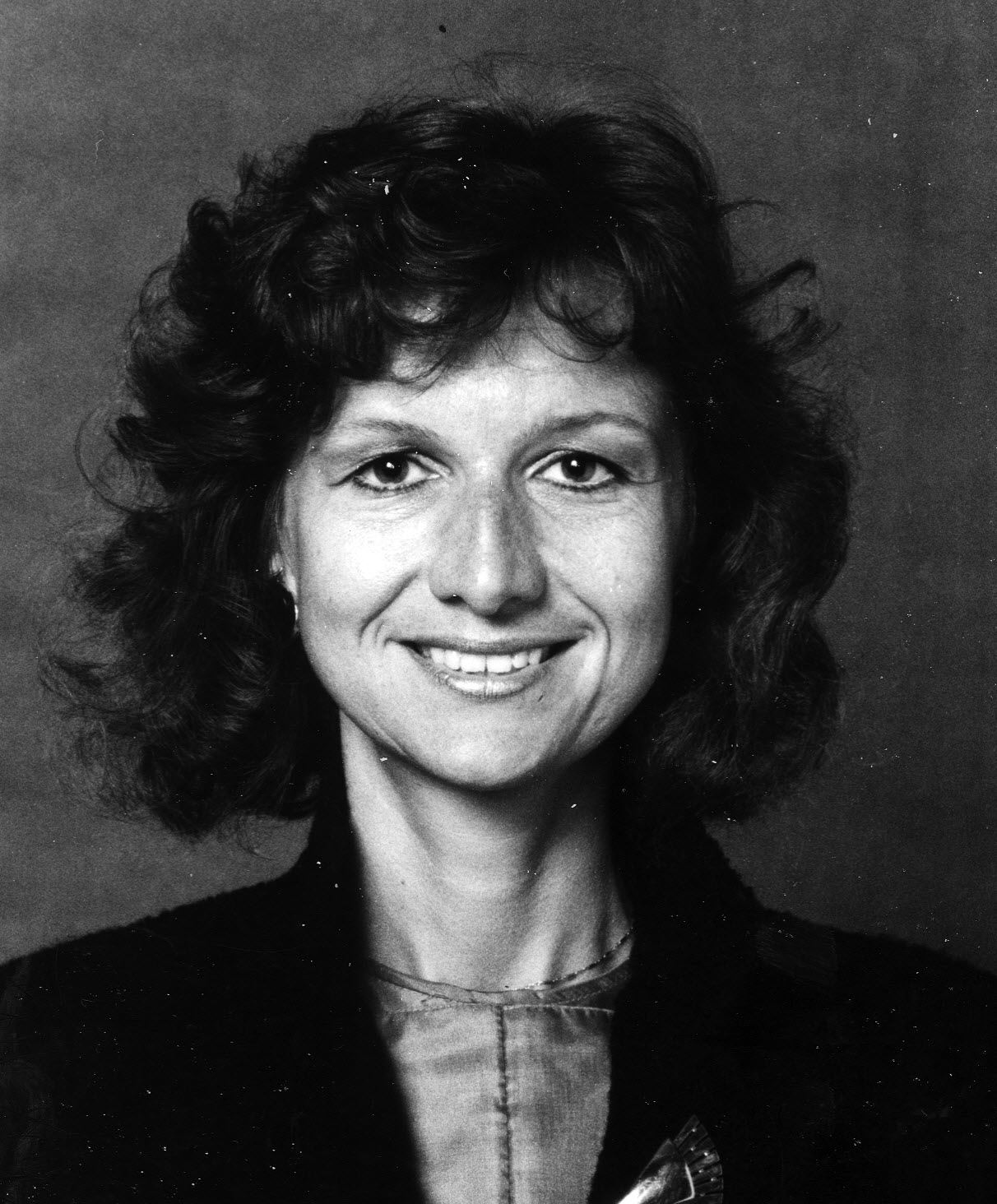
	First party	Second party
Leader	Fernand St. Germain	Claudine Schneider
Party	Democratic	Republican
Leader's seat	1st district	2nd district
Popular vote	194,925	194,308
Percentage	50.08%	49.92%

The 1984 United States House of Representatives elections in Rhode Island were held on November 6, 1984, to determine who would represent Rhode Island in the United States House of Representatives. Rhode Island had two seats in the House, apportioned according to the 1980 United States census. Representatives are elected for two-year terms.

== Overview ==
United States House of Representatives elections in Rhode Island, 1984
Party	Votes	Percentage	Seats	+/–
Democratic	194,925	50.08%	1	-
Republican	194,308	49.92%	1	-
Totals	389,233	100.0%	2	-

== District 1 ==
Rhode Island's 1st congressional district election, 1984
Party	Candidate	Votes	%
Democratic	Fernand St. Germain	130,584	68.51%
Republican	Alfred Rego Jr.	60,026	31.49%
Total votes		190,610	100.00%
Democratic hold			

== District 2 ==
1984 Democratic U.S. House primary
Party	Candidate	Votes	%
Democratic	Richard Sinapi	31,736	80.75%
Democratic	Vincent J. DuBreuil	7,567	19.25%
Total votes		39,303	100.00%

Rhode Island's 2nd congressional district election, 1984
Party	Candidate	Votes	%
Republican	Claudine Schneider	134,282	67.61%
Democratic	Richard Sinapi	64,341	32.39%
Total votes		198,623	100.00%
Republican hold			

== See also ==
- 1984 United States House of Representatives elections
