= 1984 Edmonton municipal by-election =

Municipal election in Alberta, Canada

On October 22, 1984, residents of Edmonton's Ward 6 elected an alderman to replace Bettie Hewes, who had resigned after being named to the board of the Canadian National.

== Results ==
(bold indicates elected, italics indicate incumbent)

Party	Candidate	Votes	%
Independent	**Ken Kozak**	**2,529**	**20.78%**
Independent	Sheila McKay	2,514	20.65%
Urban Reform Group Edmonton	Bernie Fiesler	2,063	16.95%
Independent	Mary Lobay	2,061	16.93%
Independent	Marc Louis Tercier	997	8.19%
Independent	Wayne Weeks	594	4.88%
Edmonton Voters Association	Mike Uhryn	355	2.92%
Independent	Larry Messier	342	2.81%
Independent	Basdeo Roopnarie	338	2.78%
Independent	George Broumas	183	1.50%
Independent	Naseer Chaudhary	160	1.31%
Independent	Carl Williams	36	0.30%
