= 1984 Caymanian general election =

General elections were held in the Cayman Islands in November 1984. The ruling Team for National Unity led by Jim Bodden lost all eight seats due to a scandal over Caymanian banks being used to launder drug money. The opposition Progress with Dignity Team of Benson Ebanks won three seats in the Legislative Assembly, but the majority (nine) were won by independents. Ebanks subsequently became Chief Minister after forming a coalition.

== Results ==
Party	Votes	%	Seats	+/–
Progress with Dignity Team			3	+1
Team for National Unity			0	–8
Independents			9	+7
Total			12	0
Total votes	6,690	–		
Registered voters/turnout	8,581	77.96		
Source: Caribbean Elections
