= Marco Taradash =

Italian politician and journalist (born 1950)

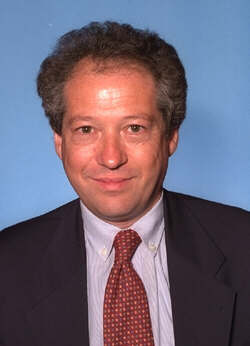

Member of the Chamber of Deputies
- In office 23 April 1992 – 29 May 2001
- Constituency: Show list: Milan (1992–94) San Giuliano Milanese (1994–96) Cava de' Tirreni (1996–01)

Member of the European Parliament
- In office 25 July 1989 – 19 July 1994
- Constituency: North-West Italy

Member of the Regional Council of Lombardy
- In office 25 May 1990 – 6 February 1991

Member of the Regional Council of Tuscany
- In office 16 April 2010 – 17 June 2015

Personal details
- Born: 19 May 1950 (age 76) Livorno, Italy
- Party: PLI (1968–1976); PR (1977–1989); FI (1994–2000); RL (2005–2009); PdL (2009–2013); NCD (2013–2015) +Eu (since 2018)
- Profession: Politician, journalist

Marco Taradash (born 19 May 1950) is an Italian politician and journalist.

== Life and career ==
Marco Taradash was born in Livorno on 19 May 1950 from a Tuscan mother and a New Yorker father, who came to Italy with the allied army. The surname has a Ukrainian Jewish origin, but while his grandmother, Zweig, kept the Jewish faith, his paternal grandfather, who fled as a child with the family to the United States, later converted to Catholicism, and his father to Protestantism.

In 1968 he enrolled in the youth organization of the Italian Liberal Party, which he left in the mid-seventies, to join the Radical Party. In the 70s he also began his journalistic career and thanks to "Stampa e Regime", the press review of Radio Radicale, he also obtained one of the most famous Italian journalistic prizes, the Premiolino.

He was elected to the European Parliament in 1989 for the Antiprohibitionists on Drugs list, while in 1994 and in 1996 he was elected to the Chamber of Deputies for Forza Italia. He also served as Chairman of the RAI Supervision Commission from 1994 to 1996.

In the 2000s he conducts some television programs of political depth. In 2005 he founded, along with Peppino Calderisi and Benedetto Della Vedova, the Liberal Reformers movement.

In 2009 he was a candidate for mayor of Livorno with the support of the centre-right coalition but he was defeated by the outgoing mayor Alessandro Cosimi, candidate for the Democratic Party.

In 2010, he was elected to the Regional Council of Tuscany for The People of Freedom but in 2013 left it to join the New Centre-Right, a party led by Angelino Alfano.

In the European elections of 2019, he was a candidate for the European Parliament with More Europe, in the central Italian constituency.

== Electoral history ==
Election	House	Constituency	Party	Votes	Result
1987	Chamber of Deputies	Verona–Padua–Vicenza–Rovigo	PR	1,099	Not elected
1989	European Parliament	North-West Italy	LAD	7,436	Elected
1992	Chamber of Deputies	Milan–Pavia	LP	4,131	Elected
1994	Chamber of Deputies	San Giuliano Milanese	LP	39,848	Elected
1994	European Parliament	North-West Italy	LP	23,037	Not elected
1996	Chamber of Deputies	Cava de' Tirreni	FI	37,509	Elected
2019	European Parliament	Central Italy	+E	6,566	Not elected
2024	European Parliament	North-West Italy	SUE	5,476	Not elected
