= 1984 European Parliament election in Italy =

- 17 June 1984
- All 81 Italian seats to the European Parliament
- Turnout: 82.47% (▼2.9 pp)
Party	Leader	Vote %	Seats	+/–
PCI	Alessandro Natta	33.3%	27	+3
DC	Ciriaco De Mita	33.0%	26	−3
PSI	Bettino Craxi	11.2%	9	0
MSI	Giorgio Almirante	6.5%	5	+1
PLI–PRI	V. Zanone & G. Spadolini	6.1%	5	0
PSDI	Pietro Longo	3.5%	3	−1
PR	Marco Pannella	3.4%	3	0
DP	Mario Capanna	1.4%	1	0
SVP	Silvius Magnago	0.6%	1	0
PSd'Az – others	Collective leadership	0.6%	1	+1
This lists parties that won seats. See the complete results below.
Result by leading party in each province

The 1984 European Parliament election in Italy was held on 17 June 1984. The election took place just six days after the death of Italian Communist Party (PCI) leader Enrico Berlinguer. This fact greatly influenced the vote, which represented the first and only time in Italian history that the PCI placed first in a national election, overcoming the dominance of Christian Democracy (DC) and producing a historic result.

== Electoral system ==
The pure party-list proportional representation was the traditional electoral system of the Italian Republic since its foundation in 1946, so it had been adopted to elect the Italian representatives to the European Parliament too. Two levels were used: a national level to divide seats between parties, and a constituency level to distribute them between candidates. Italian regions were united in 5 constituencies, each electing a group of deputies. At national level, seats were divided between party lists using the largest remainder method with Hare quota. All seats gained by each party were automatically distributed to their local open lists and their most voted candidates.

=== Constituencies ===
Seats are allocated to party lists on a national basis using an electoral quota, with the residue given to the lists with the largest excess over whole quotas. An electoral quota is then calculated for each list and used to allocate seats to each list in each of the five electoral regions.

Electoral Region	Administrative Regions	Seats
North-West	Aosta Valley, Liguria, Lombardy, Piedmont	23
North-East	Emilia-Romagna, Friuli-Venezia Giulia, Trentino-Alto Adige/Südtirol, Veneto	15
Central	Latium, Marche, Tuscany, Umbria	17
Southern	Abruzzo, Apulia, Basilicata, Calabria, Campania, Molise	18
Islands	Sardinia, Sicily	8

== Results ==
The public emotion caused by Berlinguer's tragic death resulted in an extraordinary strength for the PCI; for the first time in Western Europe since the 1956 French legislative election and the first time ever in Italian history, a Communist party received a plurality by a democratic vote. In opposition, this result reinforced the moderate government ruling the country. The Italian Socialist Party (PSI) of Prime Minister Bettino Craxi had maintained its vote, and its major ally, the defeated DC, did not want to take any chances of a political crisis that could lead to a dangerous general election.

← Summary of the 17 June 1984 European Parliament election results in Italy →
National party	EP group	Votes	%	+/–	Seats	+/–
Italian Communist Party (PCI)	COM	11,714,428	33.33	3.76 ▲	27	3 ▲
Christian Democracy (DC)	EPP	11,583,767	32.96	3.49 ▼	26	3 ▼
Italian Socialist Party (PSI)	SOC	3,940,445	11.21	0.18 ▲	9	0
Italian Social Movement (MSI)	ER	2,274,556	6.47	1.02 ▲	5	1 ▲
Italian Liberal Party – Italian Republican Party (PLI–PRI)	LD	2,140,501	6.09	2.46 ▲	5	2 ▲
Italian Democratic Socialist Party (PSDI)	SOC	1,225,462	3.49	0.83 ▼	3	1 ▼
Radical Party (PR)	NI	1,199,876	3.41	0.26 ▼	3	0
Proletarian Democracy (DP)	RBW	506,753	1.44	0.72 ▲	1	0
South Tyrolean People's Party (SVP)	EPP	198,220	0.56	0	1	0
Federalism (UV–PSd'Az–Others)	RBW	193,430	0.55	0.08 ▲	1	1 ▲
Venetian League – Union for a Federalist Europe (incl. LL–AI–UP)	None	164,115	0.47	—	0	0
Valid votes			35,141,553	94.80		
Blank and invalid votes			1,928,073	5.20		
Totals		37,069,626	100.00	—	81	—
Electorate (eligible voters) and voter turnout		44,948,253	82.47	2.91 ▼		
Source: Italian Ministry of the Interior

Popular vote
PCI	33.33%
DC	32.96%
PSI	11.21%
MSI	6.47%
PLI-PRI	6.09%
PR	3.67%
PSDI	3.49%
DP	1.44%
Others	1.58%

== See also ==
- 1984 European Parliament election in Sardinia
