= Technical Group of Independents (1979–1984) =

Nationalist group of the European Parliament

- European Parliament group
- Name: Technical Group of Independents
- English abbr.: n/a
- French abbr.: CDI
- Formal name: Group for the Technical Coordination and Defence of Independent Groups and Members
- From: 1979
- To: 1984
- Preceded by: n/a
- Succeeded by: Rainbow Group: Federation of the Green Alternative European Links, Agalev-Ecolo, the Danish People's Movement against Membership of the European Community, and the European Free Alliance, in the European Parliament
- Chaired by: Marco Pannella; Neil Blaney; Jens-Peter Bonde
- MEP(s): 11 (17 July 1979)

The Technical Group of Independents was a heterogenous political technical group in the European Parliament operating between 1979 and 1984.

== History ==
The Technical Group of Independents was formed in 1979. The group was officially called "Group for the Technical Coordination and the Defence of Independent Groups and Members" and it used the abbreviation "CDI". It was a coalition of parties ranging from the centre to the radical left, which were not aligned with any of the major international party federations. In 1984 most of the CDI members later joined the "Rainbow Group".

The group was a rather diverse alliance, and this was reflected in its chairs which included the Italian Radical Marco Pannella, the hardline Irish Republican Neil Blaney and Danish left-wing Eurosceptic Jens-Peter Bonde. On 13 December 1983, the group was joined by British MEP Michael Gallagher of the Social Democratic Party, who was previously member of the Labour Party and Socialist Group.

== MEPs at 13 December 1983 ==
Member state	MEPs	Party	MEPs by party	Notes
Belgium	1	People's Union	1	Maurits Coppieters
(Republic of Ireland) Ireland	1	Independent Fianna Fáil	1	Neil Blaney
United Kingdom	1	Social Democratic Party	1	Michael Gallagher
Denmark	4	People's Movement against the EEC	4	Else Hammerich, Jens-Peter Bonde, Sven Skovmand, Jørgen Bøgh
Italy	5	Proletarian Unity Party	1	Luciana Castellina
Italy	5	Proletarian Democracy	1	Mario Capanna
Italy	5	Radical Party	3	Marco Pannella, Emma Bonino, Leonardo Sciascia

== Sources ==
- Europe Politique
- European Parliament MEP Archives
- CVCE- Centre Virtuel de la Connaissance sur l'Europe
