= Rainbow Group (1984–1989) =

Former political group of the European Parliament

- European Parliament group
- Name: Rainbow Group (1984–1989)
- English abbr.: RBW
- French abbr.: ARC
- Formal name: Rainbow Group: Federation of the Green Alternative European Links, Agalev-Ecolo, the Danish People's Movement against Membership of the European Community, and the European Free Alliance, in the European Parliament
- Ideology: Green politics, Regionalism
- Associated organisations: Green Alternative European Link; European Free Alliance
- From: 24 July 1984
- To: 1989
- Preceded by: Technical Group of Independents
- Succeeded by: Rainbow Group
- Chaired by: Else Hammerich; Jaak Vandemeulebroucke; Bram van der Lek; Paul Staes
- MEP(s): 20 (24 July 1984)

The Rainbow Group, officially the Rainbow Group: Federation of the Green Alternative European Links, Agalev-Ecolo, the Danish People's Movement against Membership of the European Community, and the European Free Alliance, in the European Parliament was a green and regionalist political group with seats in the European Parliament between 1984 and 1989.

== History ==
The Rainbow Group was formed in 1984 as a coalition of Greens, Regionalists and other parties of the left unaffiliated with any of the international organizations.

The German Greens and the Dutch Green Progressive Alliance were used a principle of rotation used by the Germany and Dutch parties, requiring its MEPs to sit for half their five-year term.

In 1989 the Rainbow Group split. The green parties formed the Green Group, whilst the regionalist parties stayed a continuing Rainbow group, with the shorter official name of the Rainbow Group in the European Parliament.

== Member parties ==
Country	Party	MEPs	Notes
Germany	The Greens	7	MEPs served for 2.5 years (half of a regular 5-year term)
Netherlands	Political Party of Radicals	1	Member of an electoral alliance and common delegation with PSP and CPN. MEP served between 1984 and 1987
Netherlands	Pacifist Socialist Party	1	Member of an electoral alliance and common delegation with PPR and CPN
Netherlands	Communist Party of the Netherlands	1	Member of an electoral alliance and common delegation with PSP and PPR. MEP served between 1987 and 1989
Belgium	Agalev	1	Common delegation with Ecolo
Belgium	Ecolo	1	Common delegation with Agalev
Belgium	People's Union	2	Member of the European Free Alliance
Denmark	People's Movement against the European Community	4	
Italy	Proletarian Unity Party	1	Member of electoral alliance with Proletarian Democracy
Italy	Proletarian Democracy	1	Member of electoral alliance with Proletarian Unity Party
Italy	Sardinian Action Party	1	Member of the European Free Alliance

== Nomenclature ==
The formal name of the 1984–1989 Rainbow was "Rainbow Group: Federation of the Green Alternative European Links, Agalev-Ecolo, the Danish People's Movement against Membership of the European Community, and the European Free Alliance, in the European Parliament". This is the longest name of any European Parliament Group to date.
