= Antiprohibitionists on Drugs =

Defunct liberal Italian political party

Antiprohibitionists on Drugs Antiproibizionisti sulla droga
- Leader: Marco Taradash
- Founded: 1989
- Dissolved: 1992
- Preceded by: Radical Party
- Succeeded by: Pannella List
- Ideology: Drug liberalisation Liberalism; Libertarianism; Pro-Europeanism
- Political position: Centre-left
- European Parliament group: The Green Group in the European Parliament

The Antiprohibitionists on Drugs (Italian: Antiproibizionisti sulla droga; full name Italian: Lista Antiproibizionisti sulla Droga, per Roma Civica, laica e verde, contro la criminalità politica e comune, lit. 'List of Antiprohibitionists on Drugs, for a Civic, Secular and Green Rome, against Political and Common Crime') was a libertarian electoral list active in Italy from 1989 to 1992, and a successor to the Radical Party.

== Electoral results ==
=== European Parliament ===
Election year	# of overall votes	% of overall vote	# of overall seats won	+/–	Leader
1989	430,150 (#11)	1.24	1 / 87	–	Marco Taradash

Regional vote

- 6 councillors in the 1990 Italian regional elections.
