= Socialists, Democrats and Greens Group =

Political group in the Parliamentary Assembly of the Council of Europe

The Socialists, Democrats and Greens Group (French: Groupe Socialiste, SOC) is a primarily social-democratic political grouping in the Parliamentary Assembly of the Council of Europe. It was known as the Socialist Group prior to August 2017.

The group has 154 members as of October 2026. Its chair is Frank Schwabe of the SPD from Germany.

== Socialist Group membership as of October 2026 ==
Country	Party name	Members	Other affiliations		
Country	Party name	Members	European party	EU Parliament	International
Albania	Socialist Party	5	PES	N/A	Socialist International
Andorra	Groupe De Concòrdia	1	None	N/A	None
Andorra	Groupe Socialdémocrate	1	PES	N/A	Socialist International
Armenia	Armenia	1	None	N/A	None
Armenia	Civil Contract	1	None	N/A	None
Austria	GRÜNE	1	European Green Party	Greens/EFA	Global Greens
Austria	SPÖ	3	PES	S&D	Progressive Alliance
Belgium	PS	2	PES	S&D	Progressive Alliance and Socialist International
Belgium	Vooruit	1	PES	S&D	Progressive Alliance
Bosnia & Herzegovina	Social Democratic Party of Bosnia and Herzegovina	1	PES	N/A	Progressive Alliance and Socialist International
Croatia	Independent Democratic Serb Party	1	None	S&D	None
Croatia	Social Democratic Party of Croatia	2	PES	S&D	Progressive Alliance and Socialist International
Croatia	We Can! – Political Platform	1	European Green Party	Greens/EFA	None
Cyprus	DIKO - Democratic Party	1	None	S&D	Progressive Alliance
Czechia	Pirate Party	1	European Pirate Party	Greens/EFA	Pirate Parties International
Denmark	Social Democratic Party	3	PES	S&D	Progressive Alliance
Finland	Social Democratic Party	3	PES	S&D	Progressive Alliance and Socialist International
France	Écologiste et Social	2	None	None	None
France	Socialistes et apparentés	2	None	None	None
France	Socialiste, Écologiste et Républicain	2	PES	S&D	Progressive Alliance and Socialist International
Germany	BÜNDNIS 90/DIE GRÜNEN	4	European Green Party	Greens/EFA	Global Greens
Germany	SPD	8	PES	S&D	Progressive Alliance
Greece	PASOK - Movement for Change (PASOK-KINAL)	2	PES	S&D	Progressive Alliance and Socialist International
Iceland	People's Party	4	None	N/A	None
Italy	PD - IDP	6	None	None	None
Italy	SVP-PATT, Campobase	1	European Green Party	None	Global Greens
Latvia	Progressives	1	European Green Party	Greens/EFA	None
Lithuania	Dawn of Nemunas	1	None	None	None
Lithuania	Social Democratic Party of Lithuania	3	PES	S&D	Progressive Alliance and Socialist International
Lithuania	Union of Democrats "For Lithuania"	1	PES	S&D	None
Luxembourg	Parti ouvrier socialiste (LSAP)	1	European Green Party	Greens/EFA	Progressive Alliance
Malta	Labour Party	4	PES	S&D	Socialist International
Montenegro	Civic Movement United Reform Action	1	European Green Party	N/A	Global Greens
Montenegro	Democratic Party of Socialists of Montenegro	1	PES	N/A	Progressive Alliance and Socialist International
Netherlands	Progressive Netherlands	3	PES	S&D & Greens/EFA	None
North Macedonia	Coallition Vlen	1	None	N/A	None
North Macedonia	Democratic Union for Integration	1	PES	N/A	None
North Macedonia	Social Democratic Union of Macedonia	3	PES	N/A	Progressive Alliance and Socialist International
Norway	Labour Party	4	PES	N/A	Progressive Alliance
Poland	The Left	2	None	S&D	None
Portugal	PS	4	PES	S&D	Progressive Alliance and Socialist International
Romania	Social Democratic Party	6	PES	S&D	Progressive Alliance and Socialist International
San Marino	PSD	1	None	N/A	None
San Marino	LIBERA/PS	1	None	N/A	None
Serbia	Ivica Dačić – Socialist Party of Serbia	2	None	N/A	None
Serbia	Party of Freedom and Justice - Movement of Free Citizens	2	PES	N/A	None
Slovakia	SMER - Sociálna demokracia	2	None	NI	Socialist International
Spain	PSOE	10	PES	S&D	Progressive Alliance and Socialist International
Sweden	Social Democratic Party	6	PES	S&D	Progressive Alliance
Switzerland	Grüne	1	European Green Party	N/A	Global Greens
Switzerland	Parti socialiste suisse	3	PES	N/A	Progressive Alliance
Türkiye	YENI Party	6	None	N/A	Socialist International
Türkiye	CHP	1	PES	N/A	Progressive Alliance
United Kingdom	Crossbench	1	N/A	N/A	N/A
United Kingdom	Labour	22	PES	N/A	Progressive Alliance and Socialist International

== Socialist Group membership as of 2011 ==
Country	Party name	Other affiliations		
Country	Party name	European party	EU Parliament	International
Albania	Socialist Party of Albania	PES	N/A	SI
Andorra	Social Democratic Party	PES	N/A	SI
Armenia	Armenian Revolutionary Federation	None	N/A	SI
Austria	Social Democratic Party of Austria	PES	S&D	SI
Austria	The Greens	EGP	Greens/EFA	GG
Azerbaijan	Civic Unity Party	None	N/A	None
Belgium	Groen	EGP	Greens/EFA	GG
Belgium	Socialist Party	PES	S&D	SI
Belgium	Forward	PES	S&D	SI
Bosnia and Herzegovina	Alliance of Independent Social Democrats	None	N/A	None
Bosnia and Herzegovina	Social Democratic Party	PES	N/A	SI
Bulgaria	Bulgarian Socialist Party	PES	S&D	SI
Croatia	Social Democratic Party of Croatia	PES	S&D	SI
Croatia	We Can!	EGP	Greens/EFA	None
Cyprus	Democratic Party	None	S&D	None
Cyprus	Movement for Social Democracy	PES	S&D	SI
Czech Republic	Czech Social Democratic Party	PES	S&D	SI
Denmark	Social Democrats	PES	S&D	SI
Estonia	Social Democratic Party	PES	S&D	SI
Finland	Social Democratic Party of Finland	PES	S&D	SI
France	Socialist Party	PES	S&D	SI
Georgia	Citizens	None	N/A	None
Germany	Alliance 90/The Greens (part)^{[A]}	EGP	Greens/EFA	GG
Germany	Social Democratic Party of Germany	PES	S&D	SI
Greece	Panhellenic Socialist Movement	PES	S&D	SI
Hungary	Hungarian Socialist Party	PES	S&D	SI
Hungary	Politics Can Be Different	EGP	No MEPs	GG
Iceland	Social Democratic Alliance	PES	N/A	SI
Ireland	Labour Party	PES	S&D	SI
Italy	Democratic Party	PES	S&D	PA
Latvia	Harmony Centre	None	S&D	None
Lithuania	Social Democratic Party of Lithuania	PES	S&D	SI
Luxembourg	Luxembourg Socialist Workers' Party	PES	S&D	SI
Luxembourg	The Greens	EGP	Greens/EFA	GG
Malta	Labour Party	PES	S&D	SI
Moldova	Democratic Party of Moldova	PES	N/A	SI
Montenegro	Democratic Party of Socialists	PES	N/A	SI
Montenegro	Social Democratic Party of Montenegro	PES	N/A	SI
Montenegro	Socialist People's Party of Montenegro	None	N/A	None
North Macedonia	Democratic Union for Integration	None	N/A	None
North Macedonia	Social Democratic Union of Macedonia	PES	N/A	SI
Norway	Labour Party	PES	N/A	PA
Netherlands	GreenLeft	EGP	Greens/EFA	GG
Netherlands	Labour Party	PES	S&D	PA
Poland	Democratic Left Alliance	PES	S&D	SI
Poland	Palikot's Movement	None	N/A	None
Portugal	Socialist Party	PES	S&D	SI
Romania	Social Democratic Party	PES	S&D	SI
Russia	A Just Russia	None	N/A	SI
Russia	Liberal Democratic Party of Russia (part)^{[B]}	None	N/A	None
San Marino	Party of Socialists and Democrats	PES	N/A	SI
Serbia	Socialist Party of Serbia	None	N/A	None
Serbia	Party of Freedom and Justice	None	N/A	None
Slovakia	Direction – Social Democracy	PES	S&D	SI
Slovenia	Social Democrats	PES	S&D	SI
Spain	Spanish Socialist Workers' Party	PES	S&D	SI
Sweden	Swedish Social Democratic Party	PES	S&D	SI
Switzerland	Green Party of Switzerland	EGP	N/A	GG
Switzerland	Social Democratic Party of Switzerland	PES	N/A	SI
Turkey	Republican People's Party	PES	N/A	SI
Ukraine	Party of Regions (part)^{[C]}	None	N/A	None
United Kingdom	Labour Party	PES	N/A	PA
^A Two of the four Alliance 90/The Greens members sit with SOC. The other two sit with the Alliance of Liberals and Democrats for Europe.^B One of the four members of LDPR sit with SOC. The other three sit with the European Conservatives Group.^C Four of the eight members of Party of Regions sit with SOC. Two sit with the European Conservatives Group and two sit with the Alliance of Liberals and Democrats for Europe.

== See also ==
- Progressive Alliance of Socialists and Democrats
