= Rainbow Greens (Italy) =

Rainbow Greens Verdi Arcobaleno
- Leader: Mario Capanna
- Deputy Leader: Francesco Rutelli
- Spokesperson: Edo Ronchi; Adelaide Aglietta; Adele Faccio
- Founded: 1 January 1989
- Dissolved: 9 December 1990
- Merged into: Federation of the Greens
- Headquarters: Via Salandra 6, Rome
- Ideology: Green politics Eco-socialism
- Political position: Centre-left to left-wing
- European affiliation: European Federation of Green Parties (1989–1990)
- European Parliament group: Green Group (1989–1990)
- Colors: Green

Rainbow Greens (Italian: Verdi Arcobaleno) was a green political party in Italy.

It was founded in May 1989 by splinters of Proletarian Democracy (Mario Capanna, Virginio Bettini, Gianni Tamino, Edo Ronchi and Paolo Gentiloni) and some leading Radicals (Adelaide Aglietta, Adele Faccio, Francesco Rutelli, Franco Corleone and Marco Boato).

It took part in the 1989 European elections, under the denomination 'Rainbow Greens for Europe' (Verdi Arcobaleno per l'Europa), receiving 2.4% of the vote and electing 2 MEPs, who sat in the Green Group.

In December 1990 it merged with the Federation of Green Lists (Gianni Mattioli, Lino De Benetti, Gianfranco Amendola, Alexander Langer, Enrico Falqui, Sauro Turroni and Alfonso Pecoraro Scanio) to form the Federation of the Greens.
