= Mario Capanna =

Italian politician and writer (born 1945)

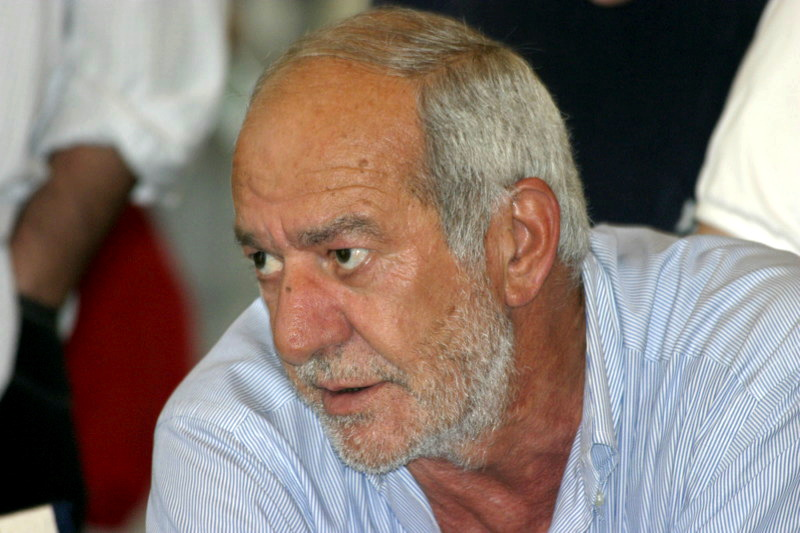

Member of the Chamber of Deputies
- In office 12 July 1983 – 22 April 1992
- Constituency: Naples (1983–1987); Palermo (1987–1992)

Member of the European Parliament
- In office 17 July 1979 – 23 July 1984
- Constituency: North-West Italy

Personal details
- Born: 10 January 1945 (age 81) Città di Castello, Italy
- Party: DP (1978–1989); VA (1989–90); FdV (1990–92)
- Spouse: Patrizia Arnaboldi (m. 1987; died 2025)
- Education: University of Milan
- Profession: Politician, writer

Mario Capanna (born 10 January 1945) is an Italian politician and writer.

== Biography ==
Mario Capanna as student leader (1968)

Born in Città di Castello, he studied philosophy at the Catholic University of Milan, and was the leader of the Italian students' movement in the late 1960s and early 1970s. In 1969 he was attacked by exponents of the neo-Fascist Italian Social Movement.

In 1975 he entered politics, adhering to the Proletarian Unity Party (PdUP), which later merged with Proletarian Democracy (DP). Capanna was charismatic leader of the latter until 27 June 1987, when he resigned, succeeded by Giovanni Russo Spena.

Capanna was elected for the DP to the Italian Chamber of Deputies (1983–1987), and to the European Parliament (1979). In 1989 he broke away from the Proletarian Democracy to form the Rainbow Greens party.

Capanna is currently President of the Committee for Genetical Rights, an independent association devoted to information on Biotechnology. Capanna is a supporter of the Campaign for the Establishment of a United Nations Parliamentary Assembly, an organisation which advocates for democratic reformation of the United Nations.

== Works ==
- Formidabili quegli anni (1988)
- Arafat (1989)
- Speranze (1994)
- Il fiume della prepotenza (1996)
- Lettera a mio figlio sul '68 (1998)
- L'Italia viva (2000)
- Verrò da te (2003)
