= Federation of Green Lists =

Federation of Green Lists Federazione delle Liste Verdi
- Leader: Gianni Francesco Mattioli
- Founded: 16 November 1986
- Dissolved: 9 December 1990
- Merged into: Federation of the Greens
- Headquarters: Via Salandra 6, Rome
- Ideology: Green politics
- Political position: Left-wing
- European Parliament group: Green Group

The Federation of Green Lists (Italian: Federazione delle Liste Verdi) or Green List (Lista Verde, LV) was a green political party in Italy. Its members included Gianni Francesco Mattioli, Lino De Benetti, Gianfranco Amendola, Alexander Langer, Enrico Falqui, Sauro Turroni and Alfonso Pecoraro Scanio. The Green Lists used the Smiling Sun symbol of the anti-nuclear movement, which was inherited by its successor party, the Federation of the Greens.

== History ==
It was founded on 16 November 1986. The party was formed as a national organisation of Green Lists which had first contested regional elections in 1985, initially being joined by seventy local lists. In the 1987 general election, the Green Lists received 2.5% for the Chamber, returning thirteen deputies as well as two senators in the Senate.

The party took part in the 1989 European Parliamentary elections, receiving 3.8% of the vote, electing 3 MEPs. A rival ecologist list, the Rainbow Greens, received 2.4% in the same election.

In December 1990 the party merged with the Rainbow Greens to form the Federation of the Greens.

== Election results ==
=== Chamber of Deputies ===
Election	Leader	Votes	%	Seats	Position	Status
1987	Gianni Francesco Mattioli	969,218	2.5	13 / 630	8th	Opposition

=== Senate ===
Election	Leader	Votes	%	Seats	Position	Status
1987	Gianni Francesco Mattioli	634,182	1.9	2 / 315	9th	Opposition

=== European Parliament ===
Election	Leader	Votes	%	Seats	Position
1989	Gianni Francesco Mattioli	1,317,119	3.8	3 / 81	6th

== Leadership ==
Spokesman:

- Gianni Francesco Mattioli (1986–1989)
- Sauro Turroni (1989–1991)
