= Proletarian Democracy =

Proletarian Democracy Democrazia Proletaria
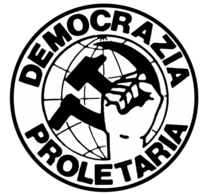
- Abbreviation: DP
- General Secretary: Mario Capanna; Giovanni Russo Spena
- Founded: 1975 (as coalition); 13 April 1978 (as party)
- Dissolved: 9 June 1991
- Split from: Proletarian Unity Party
- Merged into: Communist Refoundation Party
- Newspaper: Quotidiano dei lavoratori
- Membership: max: 10,310 (1988) min: 2,500 (1979)
- Ideology: Communism; Eco-socialism; Pacifism; Factions: Trotskyism; Workerism
- Political position: Far-left
- European Parliament group: Technical Group of Independents (1979–84); Rainbow Group (1984–89); Green Group (1989–94)
- Colours: Red

Website
- democraziaproletaria.it

Proletarian Democracy (Italian: Democrazia Proletaria, DP) was a far-left political party in Italy.

== History ==
=== 1970s ===
DP was founded in 1975 as a joint electoral front of the Proletarian Unity Party (PdUP), Workers Vanguard (AO) and the "Workers Movement for Socialism" (MLS), for the 1975 Italian regional elections. At the local level, smaller groups joined, such as the "Marxist-Leninist Communist Organization", "Revolutionary Communist Groups - IV International" and the "League of the Communists".

DP took part in the 1976 elections, winning 556,022 votes (1.51%) and 6 seats in the election to the Chamber of Deputies. On 13 April 1978, DP was transformed into a political party. The move to make DP into a real political party was pushed through by the minority wing of PdUP, led by journalist Vittorio Foa and Silvano Miniati; the majority of AO, led by Massimo Gorla and Luigi Vinci; and the League of the Communists, led by Romano Luporini.

The main figure of DP was the charismatic Mario Capanna, a former student leader associated with the 1968 New Left movement.

The strongholds of DP were the industrial cities of Northern Italy, which had strong leftist traditions. DP was opposed to the so-called 'historic compromise' between the Italian Communist Party and the Christian Democrats.

During the 1978 electoral campaign, Peppino Impastato, a leading DP member from Sicily, was murdered by the Mafia.

In the 1979 elections for the European Parliament, DP won 1 seat in the Technical Group of Independents group.

=== 1980s ===
In the 1983 Italian general election DP won 542,039 votes (1.47%) and 7 seats in the election to the Chamber of Deputies. In the 1987 general election DP won 642,161 votes (1.66%) and 8 seats in the election to the Chamber of Deputies. In the same year DP won 493,667 votes (1.52%) and one seat in the election to the Senate.

In 1987 Capanna stepped down, and Giovanni Russo Spena became the secretary of DP. Two years later, the DP suffered a split, as a section led by Capanna launched their own list on ahead of the elections to the European Parliament, in association with leading Radicals, called the Rainbow Greens.

=== 1990s ===
On 9 June 1991 the congress of DP in Riccione decided to merge the party into the Communist Refoundation Movement, which became the Communist Refoundation Party.

== Election results ==
=== Italian Parliament ===
Chamber of Deputies
Election year	Votes	%	Seats	+/−	Leader
1976	557,025 (7th)	1.5	6 / 630	–	Mario Capanna
1979	294,462 (10th)	0.8 (Note: Ran as "New United Left". The Proletarian Unity Party, part of DP in 1976, ran separately and obtained 502,247 votes, 1.4% of the vote and 6 seats.)	0 / 630	▼6	Mario Capanna
1983	542,039 (9th)	1.5	7 / 630	▲7	Mario Capanna
1987	641,901 (11th)	1.7	8 / 630	▲1	Mario Capanna

Senate of the Republic
Election year	Votes	%	Seats	+/−	Leader
1976	78,170 (11th)	0.3	0 / 315	–	Mario Capanna
1979	410,048 (9th)	1.3 (Note: Ran as "New United Left", in most constituencies in alliance with the Radical Party.)	0 / 315	–	Mario Capanna
1983	327,750 (10th)	1.1	0 / 315	–	Mario Capanna
1987	493,667 (11th)	1.5	1 / 315	▲1	Mario Capanna

=== European Parliament ===
European Parliament
Election year	Votes	%	Seats	+/−	Leader
1979	252,342 (10th)	0.7	1 / 81	–	Mario Capanna
1984	506,753 (8th)	1.4	1 / 81	–	Mario Capanna
1989	449,639 (10th)	1.3	1 / 81	–	Giovanni Russo Spena

=== Regional elections ===
Regions of Italy
Election year	Votes	%	Seats	+/−	Leader
1975	271,216 (8th)	0.9	4 / 720	–	Mario Capanna
1980	274,100 (9th)	0.9	2 / 720	▼2	Mario Capanna
1985	470,626 (9th)	1.5	9 / 720	▲7	Mario Capanna
1990	308,650 (13th)	1.0	4 / 720	▼5	Giovanni Russo Spena
