= Open Space (Italy) =

Open Space (Spazio Aperto) was an association connected to The People of Freedom (PdL), a political party in Italy.

Led by Andrea Augello and Silvano Moffa, it was one of the factions of the so-called arcipelago finiano, that is to say the area around Gianfranco Fini. Open Space represented the more conciliatory wing of Finiani, especially if compared to Generation Italy (GI). Its members included mainly former members of National Alliance close to Fini (Augello, Moffa, Pasquale Viespoli, Cesare Cursi, Oreste Tofani, Marcello De Angelis, Giuseppe Valditara, Maurizio Saia, Luca Bellotti, Tommaso Foti) and few Berlusconiani coming from Forza Italia (Debora Bergamini, Romano Comincioli, Ferruccio Saro, Enrico Musso).

Moffa was also a founding member of National Area and joined GI too, while the former refused to do so because of his disagreement with Italo Bocchino. In fact most members of Open Space (Augello, Viespoli, Cursi, Tofani, De Angelis, Foti and, of course, the four Berlusconiani) did not join GI.

In July 2010 only a third of Open Space members left the PdL groups in the Chamber and the Senate in order to join Future and Freedom (FLI), the new parliamentary party animated by GI. Moffa, Viespoli, Valditara, Saia and Bellotti joined FLI, while Augello, Cursi, Tofani, De Angelis, Foti, Bergamini, Comincioli, Saro and Musso remained in the PdL. Musso, a committed liberal, left the PdL in November, while Moffa left FLI to return into the PdL's orbit in December. In that occasion he was followed also by Giampiero Catone, Catia Polidori and Maria Grazia Siliquini.
