= Generation Italy =

Generation Italy (Generazione Italia, GI) or Finiani was an association connected to Future and Freedom (FLI), a political party in Italy, and earlier to The People of Freedom (PdL).

Although most of its members came from the conservative National Alliance (AN) and were earlier members of the Italian Social Movement (MSI), GI was a social liberal wing within the PdL. The faction's members identified themselves as close supporters of Gianfranco Fini, former leader of MSI/AN and frequent critic of Silvio Berlusconi from his post of President of the Chamber of Deputies. During the years, the former post-fascist leader had taken controversial stances on stem cell research, end of life issues, advance health care directive and immigration. Fini was also an outspoken supporter of the principle of separation of church and state and of a more structured party organisation. Although most Finiani, such as Bocchino, Adolfo Urso, Fabio Granata, Carmelo Briguglio, Flavia Perina and Giulia Bongiorno, were perfectly in line with Fini on moral issues and immigration, many others, including Andrea Ronchi, took a very different approach on these issues. In fact most Finiani were southern conservatives who opposed Berlusconi's leadership, his firm alliance with the once-separatist Lega Nord, the party's economic policy and federal reform.

== History ==
Generation Italy was launched in December 2009 by Italo Bocchino, deputy-leader of the PdL in the Chamber of Deputies, in order to better represent Fini's views within the party and push for a different party organisation, which was thought to be too dependent on Berlusconi's personality. Bocchino explained that it was not his intent or Fini's to undermine the party, while he wanted to promote internal democracy through debate and strengthen the party, especially in the North, where it had suffered a big blow from Lega Nord in 2010 regional elections. Despite this, however, the faction soon caused a major upheaval within the party. On 15 April Fini posed a sort of ultimatum to Berlusconi and hinted the formation of separate parliamentary groups from the PdL in Parliament. Some Finiani even proposed the formation of a new party outside the PdL. After some tense days, it looked likely that Fini and his group would remain in the party as a minority faction.

On 20 April 52 MPs (39 deputies and 13 senators) signed a document in support of Fini and his theses, while other 74 ex-AN MPs, including Ignazio La Russa, Maurizio Gasparri, Altero Matteoli and Giorgia Meloni, plus the Mayor of Rome Gianni Alemanno, signed an alternative document in which they reasserted their loyalty to the party and Berlusconi. It was the end of the unity of former AN members within the PdL, with most heavyweights of that party turning their back on their former leader. Fini, for his part, started attract to his faction some PdL members coming from various political backgrounds, from the former Radical Benedetto Della Vedova to former Christian Democrats such as Giuseppe Pisanu. On 22 April the National Committee of the PdL convened in Rome for the first time in a year. The conflict between Fini and Berlusconi was covered live by television. At the end of the day a resolution proposed by the party leadership was put before the assembly. The Finiani who voted against the resolution were 13 out of 172 members of the Committee: Roberta Angelilli, Andrea Augello, Italo Bocchino, Carmelo Briguglio, Cesare Cursi, Fabio Granata, Donato Lamorte, Silvano Moffa, Flavia Perina, Andrea Ronchi, Salvatore Tatarella, Adolfo Urso and Pasquale Viespoli.

On 3 May Fini officially endorsed GI through a video message in the faction's website and encouraged his followers to form a network of GI circles all around Italy. In the meantime, group of moderate Finiani led by Augello and Moffa launched a group called Open Space, that included also some close supporters of Berlusconi coming from his former Forza Italia party, in order to distance themselves by the hardliners led by Bocchino and dialogue with Berlusconi, while the conservative supporters of Fini re-grouped themselves into National Area led by Roberto Menia and, again, Moffa. However, most Finiani, including Moffa and Menia chose to join also GI.

Since then, clashes between Fini and Berlusconi became even more frequent and reached their heights in late July, when Fini questioned the morality of some party bigwigs under criminal investigation. On 29 July 2010 the party executive released a document (voted by 33 members out of 37) in which Fini was described as "incompatible" with the political line of the PdL and unable to perform his job of President of the Chamber of Deputies in a neutral way. Berlusconi asked Fini to step down from his post and the executive proposed the suspension from party membership for three hard-liner Finiani (Italo Bocchino, Fabio Granata and Carmelo Briguglio) who had harshly criticized Berlusconi and accused some party members of criminal offences. For both parts, this was the point of no turning back.

On 30 July Fini and his followers (33 deputies and 10 senators, at the time) organised separate groups both in the Chamber and the Senate under the name Future and Freedom (FLI). Only a minority of the deputies and senators coming from National Alliance followed their former long-time leader Fini into the new party, but enough to hold the balance in the Chamber of Deputies. GI was the core of the new parliamentary groups.

In the 2013 general election, FLI obtained 0.4% and no seats in the Chamber of Deputies. Both FLI and GI were disbanded soon after.

== See also ==
- Future and Freedom
- The People of Freedom
