= Legislature XVI of Italy =

16th legislature of the Italian Republic (2008–2013)

Legislature XVI of Italy XVI legislatura della Repubblica Italiana
- 16th legislature

Type
- Type: bicameral
- Houses: Chamber of Deputies; Senate of the Republic

History
- Founded: 29 April 2008
- Disbanded: 14 March 2013 (4 years, 319 days)
- Preceded by: XV Legislature
- Succeeded by: XVII Legislature

Leadership
- President of the Senate: Renato Schifani, PdL since 29 April 2008
- President of the Chamber of Deputies: Gianfranco Fini, PdL since 30 April 2008

Structure
- Seats: C: 630; S: 319 (315 + 4)
- Chamber of Deputies political groups: PD (203); PdL (202); LN (58); UdC (36); FLI (24); PT (21); IdV (14); Mixed (71)
- Senate political groups: PdL (113); PD (104); LN (22); UdC–SVP-Aut. (16); ApI–FLI–CD (13); CN (12); FdI (11); IdV (10); Mixed (18)

Elections
- Chamber of Deputies voting system: Porcellum
- Senate voting system: Porcellum
- Last general election: 13–14 April 2008

Meeting place
- Palazzo Montecitorio, Rome (C)
- Palazzo Madama, Rome (S)

Website
- leg16.camera.it www.senato.it/Leg16/home

Constitution
- Constitution of Italy

The Legislature XVI of Italy (Italian: XVI Legislatura della Repubblica Italiana) started on 29 April 2008 and ended on 14 March 2013. Its composition resulted from the snap election of 13–14 April 2008, called after President Giorgio Napolitano dissolved the houses on 6 February 2008. The dissolution of the Parliament was a consequence of the defeat of the incumbent government led by Romano Prodi during a vote of confidence in the Senate.

The legislature was dissolved by President Napolitano on 22 December 2012, a few months before the end of its natural five-year term.

== Government ==
Prime Minister	Party	Term of office		Government	Composition
Prime Minister	Party	Took office	Left office	Government	Composition
Silvio Berlusconi (1936–2023)	The People of Freedom	8 May 2008	16 November 2011	Berlusconi IV	PdL • LN • MpA (Centre-right coalition)
Mario Monti (b. 1943)	Independent	16 November 2011	28 April 2013	Monti	Independents (Technocratic cabinet)

== Composition ==
=== Chamber of Deputies ===
The number of elected deputies is 630.

- President: Gianfranco Fini (PdL until 30 July 2010, then FLI), elected on 30 April 2008
- Vice Presidents: Maurizio Lupi (PdL), Antonio Leone (PdL), Rosy Bindi (PD), Rocco Buttiglione (UdC)

Parliamentary groups in the Chamber of Deputies
Initial composition		Final composition		
Parliamentary group	Seats	Parliamentary group	Seats	Change
People of Freedom	275	People of Freedom	202	▼73
Democratic Party	217	Democratic Party	203	▼14
Lega Nord Padania	60	Northern League Padania	58	▼2
Union of the Centre	35	Union of the Centre for the Third Pole	36	▲1
Italy of Values	29	Italy of Values	15	▼14
		Future and Freedom for the Third Pole	24	▲24
		People and Territory (We the South–Freedom and Autonomy, The Populars of Italy Tomorrow-PID, Movement of National Responsibility-MRN, Popular Action, Alliance of the Centre-AdC, Popular Agreement)	21	▲21
Mixed	14	Mixed	71	▲57
Movement for Autonomy	8	Movement for the Autonomies – Allied for the South	4	▼4
Linguistic Minorities	3	Linguistic Minorities	3	Steady
		Great South – PPA	10	▲10
		Free Italy – Italian Populars – Populars for Europe – Liberals for Italy – Italian Liberal Party	10	▲10
		Rights and Freedom	5	▲5
		Democratic Centre	4	▲4
		FareItalia for the Popular Constituent	4	▲4
		Italian Republican Party – Actionists	4	▲4
		Liberal Democrats – MAIE	3	▲3
		Autonomy South – Lega Sud Ausonia – Souvereign Peoples of Europe	3	▲3
		Liberal Initiative	3	▲3
Non inscrits	3	Non inscrits	18	▲15
Total seats	630	Total seats	630	Steady

=== Senate ===
The number of elected senators was 315. At the start of the legislature there were seven life senators (Francesco Cossiga, Oscar Luigi Scalfaro and Carlo Azeglio Ciampi as former Presidents, as well as nominated life senators Giulio Andreotti, Rita Levi-Montalcini, Emilio Colombo and Sergio Pininfarina), making the total number of senators 322. At the end of the legislature, after the deaths of Cossiga, Scalfaro, Levi-Montalcini and Pininfarina, and the nomination of a new life senator (Mario Monti) the total number of senators went down to 319.

- President: Renato Schifani (PdL), elected on 29 April 2008
- Vice Presidents: Rosi Mauro (LN, then Mixed), Domenico Nania (PdL), Valerio Chiti (PD), Emma Bonino (RI)

Parliamentary groups in the Senate of the Republic
Initial composition		Final composition		
Parliamentary group	Seats	Parliamentary group	Seats	Change
The People of Freedom	146	The People of Freedom	113	▼33
Democratic Party	119	Democratic Party	104	▼15
Northern League Padania	26	Northern League Padania	22	▼4
Italy of Values	14	Italy of Values	10	▼4
UdC, SVP and Autonomies	11	Union of the Centre, SVP and Autonomies (Union Valdôtaine, MAIE, Toward North, European Republicans Movement, Italian Liberal Party, Italian Socialist Party)	16	▲5
		For the Third Pole (ApI – FLI – Democratic Centre)	13	▲13
		National Cohesion (Great South – Yes Mayors – Populars of Italy Tomorrow – The Good Government – FareItalia)	12	▲12
		Brothers of Italy – National Centre-right	11	▲11
Mixed	6	Mixed	18	▲12
MPA – Movement for Autonomy	2	MPA – Movement for the Autonomies – Allied for the South	3	▲1
		We Are The Common People Territorial Movement	2	▲2
		Democratic Participation	2	▲2
		Italian Republican Party	1	▲1
		Movement of Autonomist Socialists	1	▲1
		Rights and Freedom	1	▲1
		Pensioners' Party	1	▲1
		Democratic Union for Consumers	1	▲1
Non inscrits	4	Non inscrits	6	▲2
Total seats	322	Total seats	319	▼3

==== Senators for Life ====
Senator	Motivation	Appointed by	From	Till
Giulio Andreotti	Merits in the social field	President Francesco Cossiga	Previous legislature	Next legislature
Francesco Cossiga	Former president of Italy	ex officio	Previous legislature	17 August 2010 (deceased)
Oscar Luigi Scalfaro	Former president of Italy	ex officio	Previous legislature	29 January 2012 (deceased)
Rita Levi Montalcini	Merits in the social and scientific field	President Carlo Azeglio Ciampi	Previous legislature	30 December 2012 (deceased)
Emilio Colombo	Merits in the social field	President Carlo Azeglio Ciampi	Previous legislature	Next legislature
Sergio Pininfarina	Merits in the social field	President Carlo Azeglio Ciampi	Previous legislature	3 July 2012 (deceased)
Carlo Azeglio Ciampi	Former president of Italy	ex officio	Previous legislature	Next legislature
Mario Monti	Merits in the social field	President Giorgio Napolitano	9 November 2011	Next legislature
