= New Pole for Italy =

Centrist political coalition in Italy (2010–2012)

New Pole for Italy Nuovo Polo per l'Italia
- Leaders: Pier Ferdinando Casini; Gianfranco Fini; Francesco Rutelli; Raffaele Lombardo
- Founded: 15 November 2010
- Dissolved: 8 May 2012
- Succeeded by: With Monti for Italy (majority)
- Political position: Centre

The New Pole for Italy (Italian: Nuovo Polo per l'Italia, NPI), better known as the Third Pole (Terzo Polo) and less frequently as Pole of the Nation (Polo della Nazione), was a centrist coalition of parties in Italy active from late 2010 to sometime in 2012. By January 2013, after Mario Monti had announced his intention to step in into politics, Future Italy and other groups formed Civic Choice with direct support from Monti. Subsequently, Civic Choice, UdC, and FLI joined forces in the With Monti for Italy coalition. The NPI was founded on 15 December 2010 both as an alternative to the centre-right coalition between The People of Freedom and Lega Nord led by Silvio Berlusconi, and to the centre-left coalition between the Democratic Party and Italy of Values led by Pier Luigi Bersani.

Most NPI members were former supporters of Berlusconi but there were also a relevant group of disillusioned Democrats. The constituent members of the coalition were the Union of the Centre led by Pier Ferdinando Casini, Future and Freedom led by Gianfranco Fini, Alliance for Italy led by Francesco Rutelli, and the Movement for the Autonomies led by Raffaele Lombardo. The NPI, which was never an electoral coalition, was disbanded sometime in 2012, after Casini announced that he was no longer interested in the project. Rutelli's ApI even returned to the centre-left coalition and one of its members, Bruno Tabacci, decided to run in the 2012 Italian centre-left primary election. In September 2012, Luca Cordero di Montezemolo announced that he would take part through his Future Italy association to the formation o a new "popular, reform and authentically liberal force", which would hegemonize the political centre of Italian politics, in dialogue with "responsible people" of the established parties. Casini and Fini responded by proposing a joint "List for Italy" without party symbols.

== Composition ==
Party	Main ideology	Leader
Union of the Centre (UdC)	Christian democracy	Pier Ferdinando Casini
Future and Freedom (FLI)	Liberal conservatism	Gianfranco Fini
Alliance for Italy (ApI)	Centrism	Francesco Rutelli
Movement for Autonomies (MpA)	Regionalism	Raffaele Lombardo
Italian Liberal Party (PLI)	Liberalism	Stefano De Luca

== See also ==
- Action – Italia Viva, the Third Pole of 2022
- For the Third Pole, the parliamentary group led by Rutelli from 2011 to 2013
- List of political parties in Italy
- Segni Pact, centrist alliance of 1994
- Third Pole
