= Pier Ferdinando Casini =

Italian politician (born 1955)

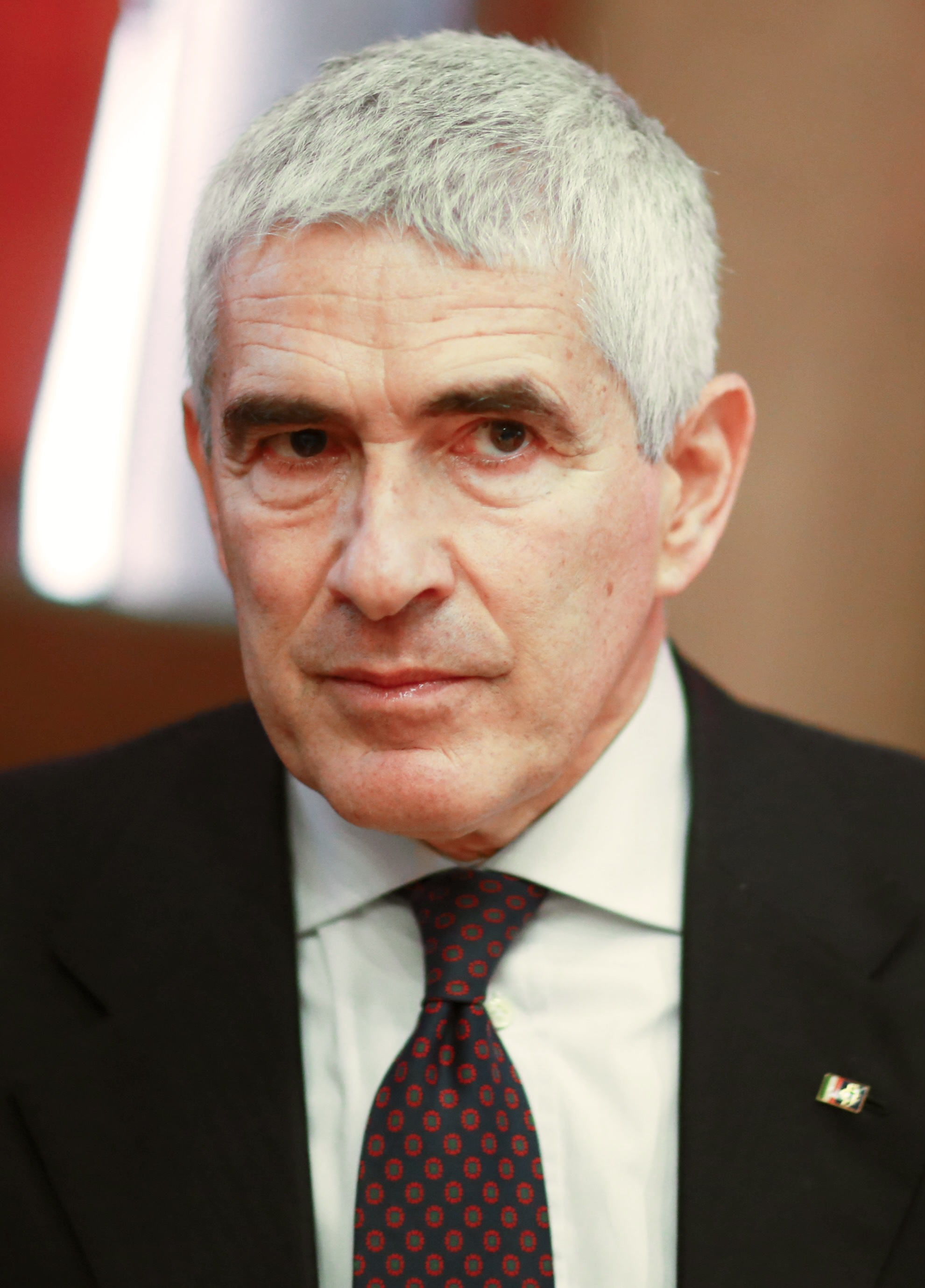
- Casini in 2016

President of the Chamber of Deputies
- In office 31 May 2001 – 27 April 2006
- Preceded by: Luciano Violante
- Succeeded by: Fausto Bertinotti

Leader of the Christian Democratic Centre
- In office 18 January 1994 – 31 May 2001
- Preceded by: Position established
- Succeeded by: Marco Follini

Member of the Senate of the Republic
- Incumbent
- Assumed office 15 March 2013
- Constituency: Show list: Bologna (2018–present) Campania (2013–2018)

Member of the Chamber of Deputies
- In office 12 July 1983 – 14 March 2013
- Constituency: Show list: Liguria (2008–2013) Lombardy 1 (2006–2008) Pomezia (2001–2006) Maglie (1996–2001) Emilia-Romanga (1994–1996) Bologna (1983–1994)

Personal details
- Born: 3 December 1955 (age 70) Bologna, Italy
- Party: DC (1980–1994); CCD (1994–2002); UDC/UdC (2002–2016); CpE (2016–present)
- Spouses: Roberta Lubich (m. 1982; div. 1998) Azzurra Caltagirone (m. 2007; div. 2016)
- Children: 4
- Education: University of Bologna
- Profession: Politician

Pier Ferdinando Casini (Italian pronunciation: [ˈpjɛr ferdiˈnando kaˈziːni]; born 3 December 1955) is an Italian politician. He served as President of the Chamber of Deputies from 2001 to 2006.

Casini is the honorary president of the Centrist Democrat International and the Inter-Parliamentary Union. From 1993 to 2001, he served as secretary of Christian Democratic Centre, while from 2002 until 2016 he was the leader of Union of the Centre. Being elected to the Chamber of Deputies in 1983 for the first time, Casini is the longest-serving member of the parliament in Italy.

== Early life and career ==
Casini was born in Bologna in 1955. His father Tommaso was an Italian literature teacher and a local leader of the Christian Democracy (DC), while his mother Mirella was a librarian. Casini has also two sisters and one brother.

After having attended the classical lyceum Luigi Galvani, in 1979 he graduated with a degree in law at the University of Bologna. During these years he joined the Christian Democracy, like his father, and he was elected to the national directorate of the party's youth wing. In 1980, Casini was elected municipal councillor in his hometown, Bologna, a traditional stronghold of the Italian Communist Party (PCI), the DC' historic rival.

== Political career ==
=== Beginnings within the Christian Democracy ===
In the 1983 Italian general election, at only 28 years old, Casini was elected to the Chamber of Deputies, becoming one of the youngest members of the parliament. He run in the multi-member constituency of Bologna, gaining more than 34,000 votes. During his first years as deputy, he became a close advisor of Arnaldo Forlani, one of the most prominent leaders of the DC, head of the conservative faction of the party. When Forlani was elected secretary of the DC in February 1989, he appointed Casini in the national directorate of the party. In the 1987 Italian general election, he was re-elected with more than 52,000 votes and appointed vice president of the so-called "Massacres Commission", focused on the terrorist attacks perpetrated in Italy during the Years of Lead. In the 1992 election, Casini was once again elected in Bologna's constituency with 50,000 votes.

=== Leader of Christian Democratic Centre ===
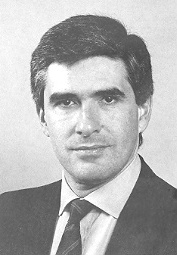
Casini in March 1994

In 1993, at the beginning of the secretariat of Mino Martinazzoli, the Christian Democracy was overwhelmed by investigations on Tangentopoli corruption scandal and mafia trial of the long-time Christian democratic leader, Giulio Andreotti. The party suffered a serious consensus crisis, and Casini, together with Clemente Mastella, took positions against Martinazzoli, leaning towards an alliance with Forza Italia (FI), a new conservative political party founded by the media magnate Silvio Berlusconi, the Italian Social Movement (MSI) of Gianfranco Fini and Umberto Bossi's Northern League (LN), aiming at forming a centre-right coalition in opposition to the centre-left one built around the post-communist Democratic Party of the Left (PDS).

On 18 January 1994, along with other Christian democrats who opposed the party's transformation into the Italian People's Party (PPI), Casini founded the Christian Democratic Centre (CDC). On the same day, he was appointed secretary of the party. In the 1994 general election, the CCD run in a joint list with Forza Italia as a member of the Pole of Freedoms in Northern Italy and the Pole of Good Government in Southern Italy, and gaining 27 deputies and 12 senators. Casini was elected in the closed list constituency of Emilia-Romagna. When Berlusconi's first government lost the support of Lega Nord, Casini did not support the newly formed technocratic cabinet of Lamberto Dini.

In the 1996 Italian general election, Casini's CDC formed a joint list with Rocco Buttiglione's United Christian Democrats (CDU). However, the election was characterized by a strong aftermath of the centre-left coalition, The Olive Tree, led by Romano Prodi. Casini was elected with nearly 40,000 votes in the single-member constituency of Maglie, in Apulia region. From 1996 to 2001, he strongly opposed the centre-left governments which ruled the country.

=== President of the Chamber of Deputies ===
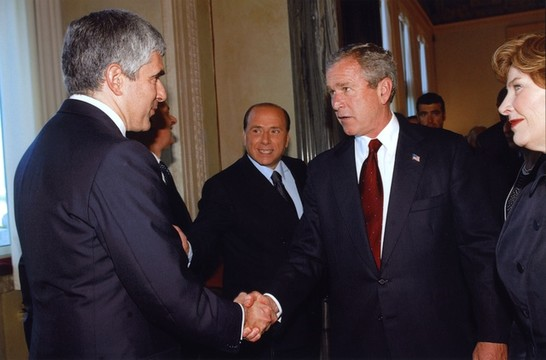
Casini with U.S. President George W. Bush in 2004

In 2001, Casini's CDC joined the House of Freedoms alliance, once again led by Berlusconi. The centre-right coalition largely won the 2001 election and Casini was elected to the Chamber for Pomezia's district, with 56,000 votes. On 31 May 2001, he was elected President of the Chamber of Deputies; at 46 years old, he was one of the youngest ever.

On 14 November 2002, Casini was the protagonist of a historical event that never happened before: the visit of a Pope to Palazzo Montecitorio, the seat of the Chamber of Deputies. Casini and Senate's president, Marcello Pera, invited Pope John Paul II to the house.

On 6 December 2002, the CDC formed, along with Buttiglione's UDC and Sergio D'Antoni's European Democracy (DE), the Union of Christian and Centre Democrats (UDC). Casini, who was serving as the president of the Chamber of Deputies, could not be appointed secretary of the party and he would never be; however, from 2002 until 2016 when he left the party, Casini would be the most recognisable figure and de facto leader of UDC.

=== Leader of Union of the Centre ===
On 28 January 2006, Casini was elected president of the Christian Democratic International (IDC), succeeding José María Aznar, a position that he held until July 2015. During the electoral campaign for the 2006 Italian general election, Casini hypothesized together with Gianfranco Fini, an alternative candidate for the position of prime minister, if UDC and Fini's National Alliance (AN) had reached a larger number of votes than those of Berlusconi's party. The UDC in fact inserted Casini's name in the new electoral symbol. However, the 2006 election was narrowly won by the centre-left coalition of Romano Prodi, who became the new prime minister.

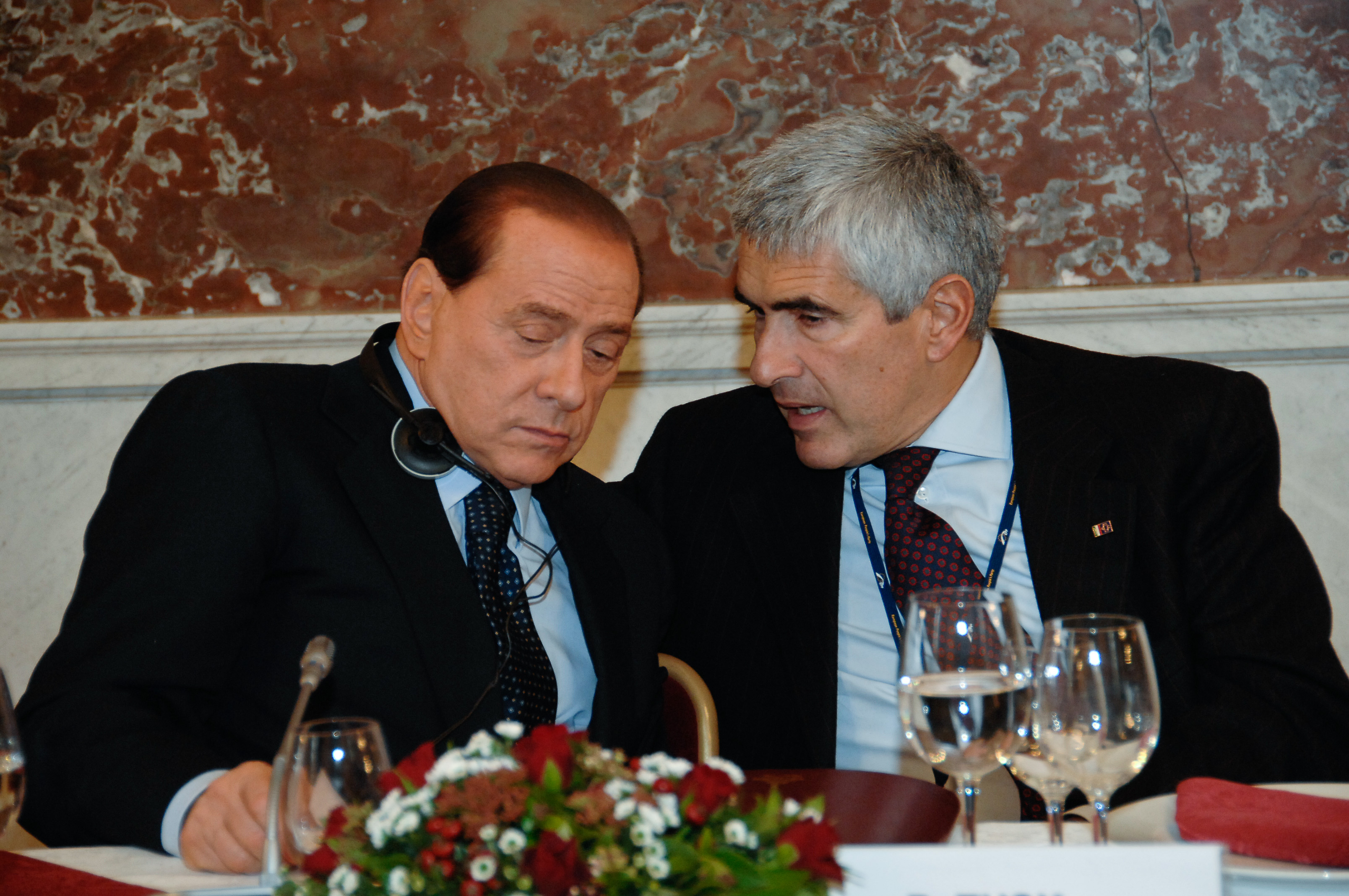
Casini and Silvio Berlusconi in 2008

Tensions between UDC and House of Freedoms became clear on 2 December 2006, when the centre-right parties, united in opposition to Prodi's cabinet, nevertheless organized two different demonstrations: Berlusconi, Fini and Bossi led the protest through Rome, while Casini and other leaders of UDC spoke in Palermo. During these years, Casini was sometimes spoken of as a possible successor to Berlusconi himself as leader of the coalition. However, as the campaign for the 2008 general election began, Casini officially detached himself from Berlusconi's coalition, refusing to enter his new People of Freedom (PdL) party, preferring to contest the election alone. In a speech to his party, Casini said that "not everyone is for sale", in a not so veiled statement about Berlusconi's political tactics. Casini ran on a purely 'centrist' platform, expanding the UDC into the Union of the Centre (UdC) along with Savino Pezzotta's White Rose. The election was won by the centre-right coalition and became prime minister once again. The Union of the Centre gained 5.6% of votes and Casini was elected in the multi-member constituency of Liguria.

After the election, Casini relaunched his plan for a new centrist party, as an alternative to both the PdL and the newly created Democratic Party. Casini long criticised the PdL for not being "Catholic" enough, particularly criticising Berlusconi, who once spoke of "anarchy of values" in describing the catch-all nature of the PdL, and Gianfranco Fini, who was known for his social-liberal stance on stem-cell research, abortion and right-to-die issues, and explicitly wooed the "Christian democrats of the PD" to join him.

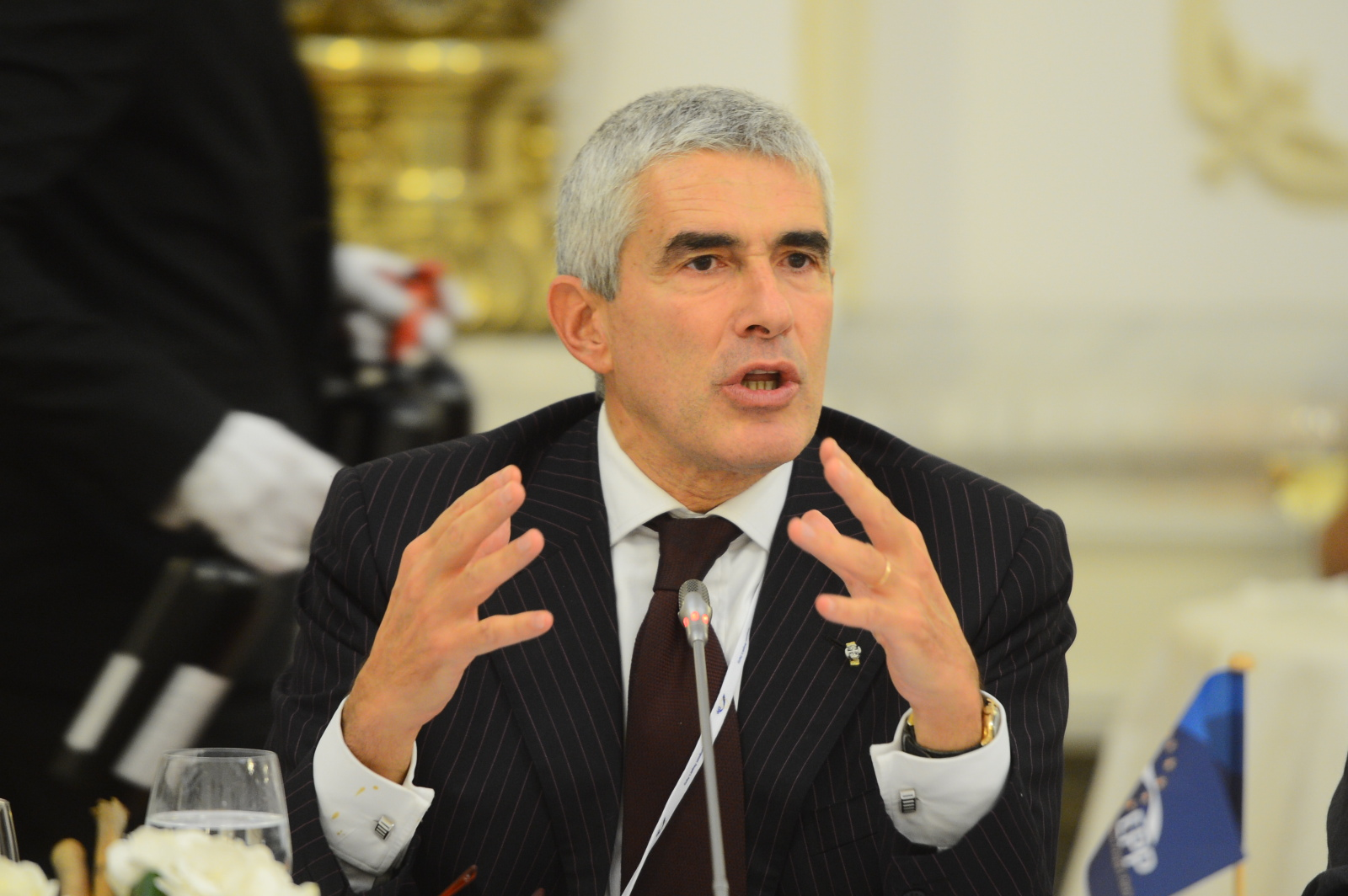
Casini at the European People's Party congress in 2012

In the 2009 European Parliament election in Italy, the UdC won 6.5% of the votes, while in the 2010 regional elections, UdC chose to form alliances both with the centre-right and the centre-left (or stood alone) in different regions, depending on local conditions, losing ground everywhere but in those southern regions where it was in alliance with the centre-right. In December 2010, Casini was one of the founding fathers of New Pole for Italy (NPI), along with Fini's newly born Future and Freedom (FLI) and the Francesco Rutelli's Alliance for Italy. The NPI's aim was to form a third distinct bloc from the centre-right and the centre-left.

In November 2011, Berlusconi resigned as prime minister and Mario Monti formed a new technocratic government. Casini was a strong supporter of Monti's policies and, in the 2013 Italian general election, his party joined With Monti for Italy coalition, alongside FLI and Monti's Civic Choice (SC). The election resulted however in a huge defeat for the UdC, which obtained a mere 1.8% of the vote, eight deputies and two senators. Casini was elected in the Senate for the first time, within the multi-member constituency of Campania.

=== Within the centre-left coalition ===
In 2013, Casini supported the grand coalition cabinet of Enrico Letta and, in February 2014, the new centre-left government of Matteo Renzi. In the run-up of the 2016 Italian constitutional referendum, strongly supported by Renzi, the UdC chose to campaign for "No", while Casini was among the keenest supporters of "Yes". After the referendum, which saw a defeat of the "Yes" side, the UdC withdrew its support for Renzi. However, some UdC splinters, notably including Casini and minister Gian Luca Galletti, launched "Centrists for Italy" and confirmed their alliance with the Angelino Alfano's New Centre-Right, in support of the centre to centre-left cabinet. Renzi resigned due to the referendum's lost and Paolo Gentiloni became the new prime minister.

The new party was officially founded in February 2017 and named Centrists for Europe (CpE). In December 2017 the CpE launched the Popular Civic List (CP), within the centre-left coalition, along with Popular Alternative (AP), Italy of Values (IdV), Solidary Democracy (DemoS) and minor parties. The new leader of AP, Beatrice Lorenzin, was chosen as leader of the list too. In the 2018 Italian general election, the CP obtained a mere 0.5%, but Casini was re-elected to the Senate with nearly 122,000 votes from a single-seat constituency in Bologna, thanks to the decisive support of the PD.

In the 2022 Italian presidential election, Casini was considered one of the most reliable candidates but later asked to rule out his name and vote for the incumbent president Sergio Mattarella.

== Personal life ==
In 1982, Casini married Roberta Lubich, with whom he had two daughters, Maria Carolina and Benedetta. The coupled divorced in 1998 and he started dating Azzurra Caltagirone, daughter of the famous Roman entrepreneur and publisher Francesco Gaetano Caltagirone, who he married in 2007 and with whom he has other two children, Caterina and Francesco. They divorced in 2016.

Casini is an avid supporter of Bologna FC 1909 and Virtus Bologna, respectively the football and basketball teams of his hometown.

== Electoral history ==
Election	House	Constituency	Party	Votes	Result
1983	Chamber of Deputies	Bologna–Ferrara–Ravenna–Forlì	DC	34,409	Elected
1987	Chamber of Deputies	Bologna–Ferrara–Ravenna–Forlì	DC	52,667	Elected
1992	Chamber of Deputies	Bologna–Ferrara–Ravenna–Forlì	DC	50,323	Elected
1994	Chamber of Deputies	Emilia-Romagna	CCD	– (Note: Elected in a closed list proportional representation system.)	Elected
1996	Chamber of Deputies	Apulia – Maglie	CCD	39,863	Elected
2001	Chamber of Deputies	Lazio 1 – Pomezia	UDC	56,109	Elected
2006	Chamber of Deputies	Lombardy 1	UDC	–	Elected
2008	Chamber of Deputies	Liguria	UDC	–	Elected
2013	Senate of the Republic	Campania	UDC	–	Elected
2018	Senate of the Republic	Emilia-Romagna – Bologna	CpE	121,898	Elected
2022	Senate of the Republic	Emilia-Romagna – Bologna	CpE	232,092	Elected

=== First-past-the-post elections ===
1996 general election (C): Apulia — Maglie
Candidate	Coalition	Votes	%
Pier Ferdinando Casini	Pole for Freedoms	39,863	53.7
Aurelio Gianfreda	The Olive Tree	34,381	46.3
Total		72,244	100.0

2001 general election (C): Lazio 1 — Pomezia
Candidate	Coalition	Votes	%
Pier Ferdinando Casini	House of Freedoms	56,109	54.5
Angelo Capriotti	The Olive Tree	37,365	36.3
Others		9,478	9.2
Total		102,952	100.0

2018 general election (S): Bologna
Candidate	Coalition	Votes	%
Pier Ferdinando Casini	Centre-left coalition	121,898	34.2
Elisabetta Brunelli	Centre-right coalition	99,824	28.0
Michela Montevecchi	Five Star Movement	87,052	24.4
Vasco Errani	Free and Equal	30,937	8.7
Others		17,260	4.7
Total		356,871	100.0

2022 general election (S): Bologna
Candidate	Coalition	Votes	%
Pier Ferdinando Casini	Centre-left coalition	232,092	40.1
Vittorio Sgarbi	Centre-right coalition	187,206	32.3
Fabio Selleri	Five Star Movement	62,930	10.9
Marco Lombardo	Action – Italia Viva	54,244	9.4
Others		42,794	7.3
Total		579,266	100.0

== Honours and awards ==
- Malaysia : Honorary Grand Commander of the Order of the Defender of the Realm (2003)
- Uruguay : Grand Cordon of the Medal of the Oriental Republic of Uruguay (2003)

== Works ==
- C'era una volta la politica. Parla l'ultimo democristiano, Piemme, 2023, ISBN 9788856688610 (presented at Villa Bertelli, Forte dei Marmi)

Party political offices
Position established	Leader of the Christian Democratic Centre; 1994–2001	Succeeded by Marco Follini
Political offices
Preceded by Luciano Violante	President of the Italian Chamber of Deputies; 2001–2006	Succeeded by Fausto Bertinotti
