= Tatarella =

Tatarella is an Italian surname. Notable people with the surname include:

- Giuseppe Tatarella (1935–1999), Italian politician
- Salvatore Tatarella (1947–2017), Italian politician
