= For the Third Pole =

For the Third Pole Per il Terzo Polo
- Chamber: Senate of the Republic
- Legislature(s): XVI
- Foundation: 14 July 2011
- Dissolution: 14 March 2013
- Leader: Francesco Rutelli
- Ideology: Centrism; Liberalism
- Political position: Centre

For the Third Pole (Per il Terzo Polo) was a parliamentary group the Senate of the Republic active in the Legislature XVI of Italy.

Launched on 14 July 2011, the group consisted of members of Future and Freedom and Alliance for Italy. The president of the group was Francesco Rutelli, leader of Alliance for Italy.

The group placed itself in opposition to the Berlusconi IV Cabinet, while it guaranteed parliamentary support for the subsequent Monti Cabinet (2011–2013).

== Composition ==
Alliance for Italy

- Senators: Francesco Rutelli, Giacinto Russo (since 20 September 2011), Emanuela Baio, Franco Bruno, Cristina De Luca (since 15 February 2012), Riccardo Milana (until 16 October 2012), Claudio Molinari

Future and Freedom

- Senators: Candido De Angelis, Maria Ida Germontani (since 20 September 2011), Mario Baldassarri, Barbara Contini, Egidio Digilio, Anna Maria Mancuso (since 31 October 2012), Nino Strano (3 November 2011 – 20 December 2012), Giuseppe Valditara

== Leadership ==
- Francesco Rutelli (2011 – 2013)
