= National Area =

National Area (Area Nazionale, AN) was an association connected to Future and Freedom (FLI), a political party in Italy, and earlier to The People of Freedom.

Founded by Roberto Menia and Silvano Moffa (who was also a leading member of Open Space), it represented the right wing of the so-called arcipelago finiano, that is to say the area around Gianfranco Fini. Most members of the group, whose acronym was identical to that of National Alliance (AN), the party Fini founded from the Italian Social Movement (MSI) in 1995 and finally led into the PdL in 2009, were members of Generation Italy too.

In July 2010 virtually all National Area members left the PdL groups in the Chamber and the Senate in order to join FLI, the new parliamentary party animated by GI. Menia and Moffa became coordinators of the political platform and the parliamentary groups of FLI, respectively.

In December 2010 Moffa left FLI, which had become a staunch opponent of Silvio Berlusconi, to return into the PdL's orbit, while Menia remained firmly behind Fini.
