= FreeRight =

Italian political association

FreeRight (Italian: LiberaDestra, LD) is a liberal-conservative political association in Italy.

LD was launched by Gianfranco Fini, former leader of the Italian Social Movement (MSI), National Alliance (AN) and Future and Freedom (FLI), former minister of Foreign Affairs, former deputy prime minister and former president of the Chamber of Deputies, in October 2013.

The association's leading principles are patriotism (i.e. not nationalism), legality, liberty and European integration. In Fini's words, "if the political and cultural community of the right is able to work in the near future to express original ideas in line with its traditional values and if new leaders emerge, the political right will resume its path in a credible way" and he "will try [...] to give a contribution of ideas and proposals in order to define the countenance of an Italian right finally alike [...] to several European formations." In this respect, Fini has long hinted that he might return to active politics and expressed interest in the creation of a party representing both the traditional and the "moderate" right, as opposed to the "populism" supposedly espoused by Brothers of Italy and Lega Nord, AN's historical nemesis.
