= With Monti for Italy =

Italian coalition of parties

With Monti for Italy Con Monti per l'Italia
- Leader: Mario Monti
- Founded: 28 December 2012
- Dissolved: 22 October 2013
- Preceded by: New Pole for Italy (majority)
- Ideology: Liberalism; Pro-Europeanism; Reformism; Christian democracy
- Political position: Centre

Website
- www.agenda-monti.it

With Monti for Italy (Italian: Con Monti per l'Italia) was an electoral coalition of political parties in Italy, formed for the 2013 general election to support the outgoing Prime Minister Mario Monti and his reform plans. Its platform was based on Monti's manifesto titled "Change Italy. Reform Europe."

== Formation and composition ==
The coalition was launched in December 2012 during the last month of the Monti Cabinet. It comprised the following parties:

Party	Main ideology	Leader
Civic Choice	Liberalism	Mario Monti
Union of the Centre	Christian democracy	Pier Ferdinando Casini
Future and Freedom	Conservatism	Gianfranco Fini

While the Union of the Centre and Future and Freedom were established parties, Civic Choice was formed in the run-up of the election by Monti. Its core consisted of Toward the Third Republic, a centrist outfit formed in November 2012 by the merger of Luca Cordero di Montezemolo's Future Italy with other centrist associations as Toward North, established parties such as Lorenzo Dellai's Union for Trentino, and some leading figures from progressive Catholic ecclesial movements and trade associations, notably including minister Andrea Riccardi of the Community of Sant'Egidio, Andrea Olivero of the Christian Associations of Italian Workers and Luigi Marino of Confcooperative. Beyond Riccardi, also ministers Renato Balduzzi and Enzo Moavero Milanesi joined Civic Choice. Moreover, a number of individual representatives of the centre-left Democratic Party and centre-right The People of Freedom announced their defections to Monti's party. The partyless economist Monti presented the grouping as a civil movement and rejected the traditional notions of political left, right, or centre.

Because of the particularities of Italy's electoral law, the coalition ran as an alliance of three constituent lists for the Chamber of Deputies and as a single list for the Senate. Monti has chosen business executive Enrico Bondi to assist him with examining the coalition's candidates.

== Electoral results ==
Election	Leader	Chamber of Deputies				Senate of the Republic			
Election	Leader	Votes	%	Seats	Position	Votes	%	Seats	Position
2013	Mario Monti	3,772,582	10.56	47 / 630	4th	2,981,534	9.13	19 / 315	4th

== Symbols ==
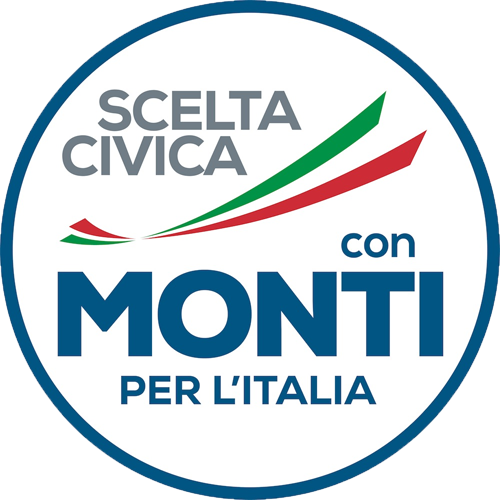
Logo of "Civic Choice" list for the Chamber of Deputies (one of three constituent lists)

Logo of the coalition's joint Senate list "With Monti for Italy"
