= Italo Bocchino =

Italian politician and journalist

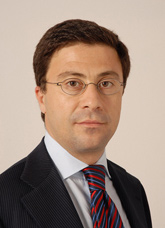

Member of the Chamber of Deputies
- In office 9 May 1996 – 14 March 2013

Personal details
- Born: Italo Bocchino; 6 July 1967 (age 59) Naples, Italy
- Party: MSI (until 1995); AN (1995–2009); PdL (2009–2010); FLI (2010–2013)
- Spouse: Gabriella Buontempo
- Education: University of Naples Federico II
- Profession: Politician, journalist

Italo Bocchino (born 6 July 1967) is an Italian politician and journalist.

== Biography ==
Bocchino was born in Naples, and in his youth, he was a member of the Italian Social Movement (a post-fascist formation) and worked as a spokesman for the member of parliament Giuseppe Tatarella, and subsequently as a journalist for Il Secolo d'Italia.

In 1996, 2001 and 2006 he was elected to the Italian Chamber of Deputies for National Alliance, the party founded by Gianfranco Fini to replace MSI. In 2005 he was the centre-right candidate for the presidency of the Campania region, but was defeated by Antonio Bassolino. In 2007 he founded Con, a conservative magazine.

Despite having been elected to the Italian Parliament into The People of Freedom lists in 2008, Bocchino in 2010 followed Gianfranco Fini to found Future and Freedom, a centre-right party which aims to counter Silvio Berlusconi's predominance in the Italian right area. Within the party, he is the founder of the Generation Italy movement.

== Sources ==
- Bocchino, Italo; Orazio Abbamonte (2006). L'esperienza della politica. Un dialogo. ISBN 88-498-1344-9.

Italian Chamber of Deputies
Preceded by Title jointly held	Member of the Italian Chamber of Deputies; Legislatures; XIII, XIV, XV, XVI; 1996 – 2013	Succeeded by Title jointly held
Party political offices
New political party	Chamber of Deputies Group Leader of Future and Freedom; 2010–2011	Succeeded by Benedetto Della Vedova
New political party	Vice President of Future and Freedom; 2011–2013	Party dissolved
