= Giulia Bongiorno =

Italian lawyer and politician (born 1966)

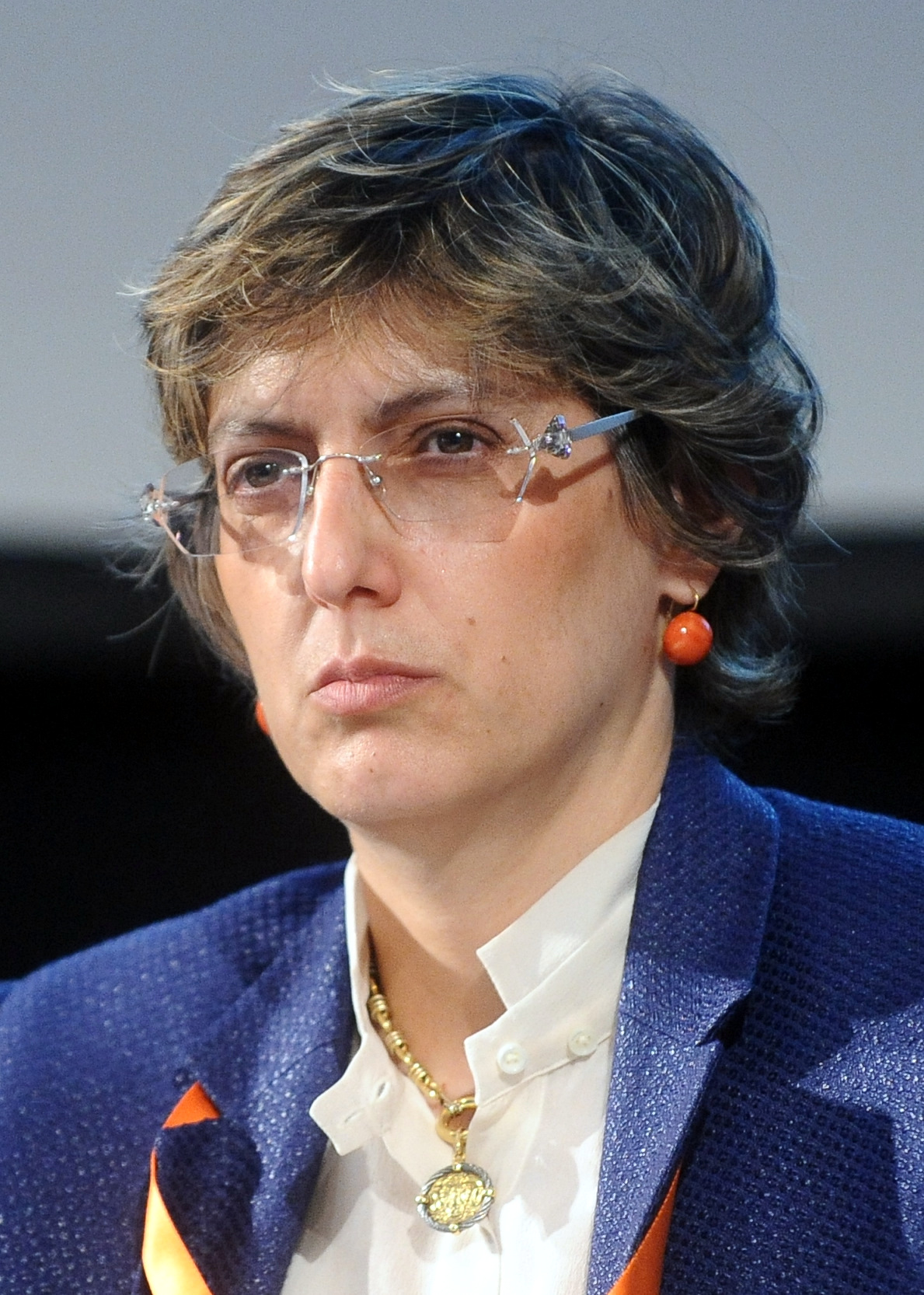

Minister of Public Administration
- In office 1 June 2018 – 5 September 2019
- Prime Minister: Giuseppe Conte
- Preceded by: Marianna Madia
- Succeeded by: Fabiana Dadone

Member of the Senate for Sicily
- Incumbent
- Assumed office 23 March 2018

Member of the Chamber of Deputies for Lazio's 1st district
- In office 28 April 2006 – 14 March 2013

Personal details
- Born: 22 March 1966 (age 60) Palermo, Italy
- Party: AN (before 2009); PdL (2009–2010); FeL (2010–2013); Independent (2013–2018); Lega (since 2018)
- Education: University of Palermo

Giulia Bongiorno (born 22 March 1966) is an Italian lawyer and politician who served as the Italian Minister of Public Administration from 1 June 2018 to 5 September 2019. A prominent criminal defense attorney, she has served in both houses of the Italian parliament: formerly a member of the Chamber of Deputies from 2008 to 2013, she has served as a Senator of the Italian Republic since 15 March 2018.

== Background ==
A native of Sicily, Bongiorno (a relative of Mike Bongiorno, the television host) studied at a Liceo classico, before matriculating to the University of Palermo, where she studied law.

== Law career ==
As a lawyer, she first rose to fame with her defence of Giulio Andreotti, the forty-first Prime Minister of Italy, during his Mafia association trials. Bongiorno, then in her twenties, successfully defended the statesman in court over the next decade, through multiple appeals, finally culminating in a full acquittal before the Supreme Court of Cassation in 2004. Her work in white-collar crime also brought her into contact with Sergio Cragnotti, the former head of Italian food company Cirio, whom she defended in a fraud case in 2008.

She then went on to defend well-known clients, such as Ezio Greggio, Tiziano Ferro, and Simone Pianigiani, in tax-related criminal proceedings. Bongiorno was also involved in cases with Clementina Forleo and Niccolò Ghedini; as well as the acquittal of three Google executives, including David Drummond and George Reyes of defamation, in a case involving a video showing students bullying a handicapped boy.

Her defense of Raffaele Sollecito, a college student, in the murder trial of Meredith Kercher resulted in the acquittal of her client; the subsequent trials and acquittal of Sollecito's girlfriend, Amanda Knox, went on to become a cause célèbre in the United States.

In the wake of the Costa Concordia disaster, she represented passengers suing the cruise line.

Bongiorno is also known for her work in sports law, representing clients ranging from fencer Andrea Baldini, to footballers Cristiano Doni and Francesco Totti.

== Political career ==
First elected to the Chamber of Deputies in 2006 for the constituency of Lazio, Bongiorno left the lower house in 2013, having been re-elected in the snap election of 2008. Originally a member of the National Alliance, upon its dissolution, she joined its successor, The People of Freedom, led by Silvio Berlusconi. After Berlusconi split with Gianfranco Fini in July 2010, she left as well, joining Fini's new Future and Freedom party, becoming a spokesperson for Future and Freedom, and protesting against Berlusconi's scandals.

After the general election in 2018, where she was elected Senator for Sicily among the ranks of the League, she was seen a possible candidate for prime minister.

=== Political positions ===
Bongiorno is a chief architect of the 2009 law criminalising stalking; she has also denounced femicide. In 2014, Bongiorno proposed that housewives should be paid for their work, in order to strengthen their economic independence and advance their social dignity.

During her time in the lower house, Bongiorno shepherded a wiretapping bill through Parliament; the Italian Wikipedia protested by shutting down for a time. After punitive amendments were added, she disowned the bill entirely, and it ultimately failed to pass. In 2017, she rejected another version of the bill, saying that it contained ambiguities of language and imposed a burden on judges.

== Minister of Public Administration ==
On 1 June 2018, Bongiorno became the Italian Minister of Public Administration. With the fall of the cabinet during the 2019 Italian government crisis, and the subsequent establishment of the Conte II Cabinet, Bongiorno ceased to be minister in early September 2019.

== Other work ==
Bongiorno and Michelle Hunziker established a nonprofit foundation in 2007, Doppia Difesa (Double Defense), to combat discrimination, violence, and abuse against women. The foundation has, among other activities, begun public awareness campaigns (including with Swarovski), participated in conferences, and has received awards. The effectiveness of the foundation's efforts have been questioned.

== See also ==
- Conte Cabinet
