= Future and Freedom =

Defunct political party in Italy

Future and Freedom for Italy Futuro e Libertà per l'Italia
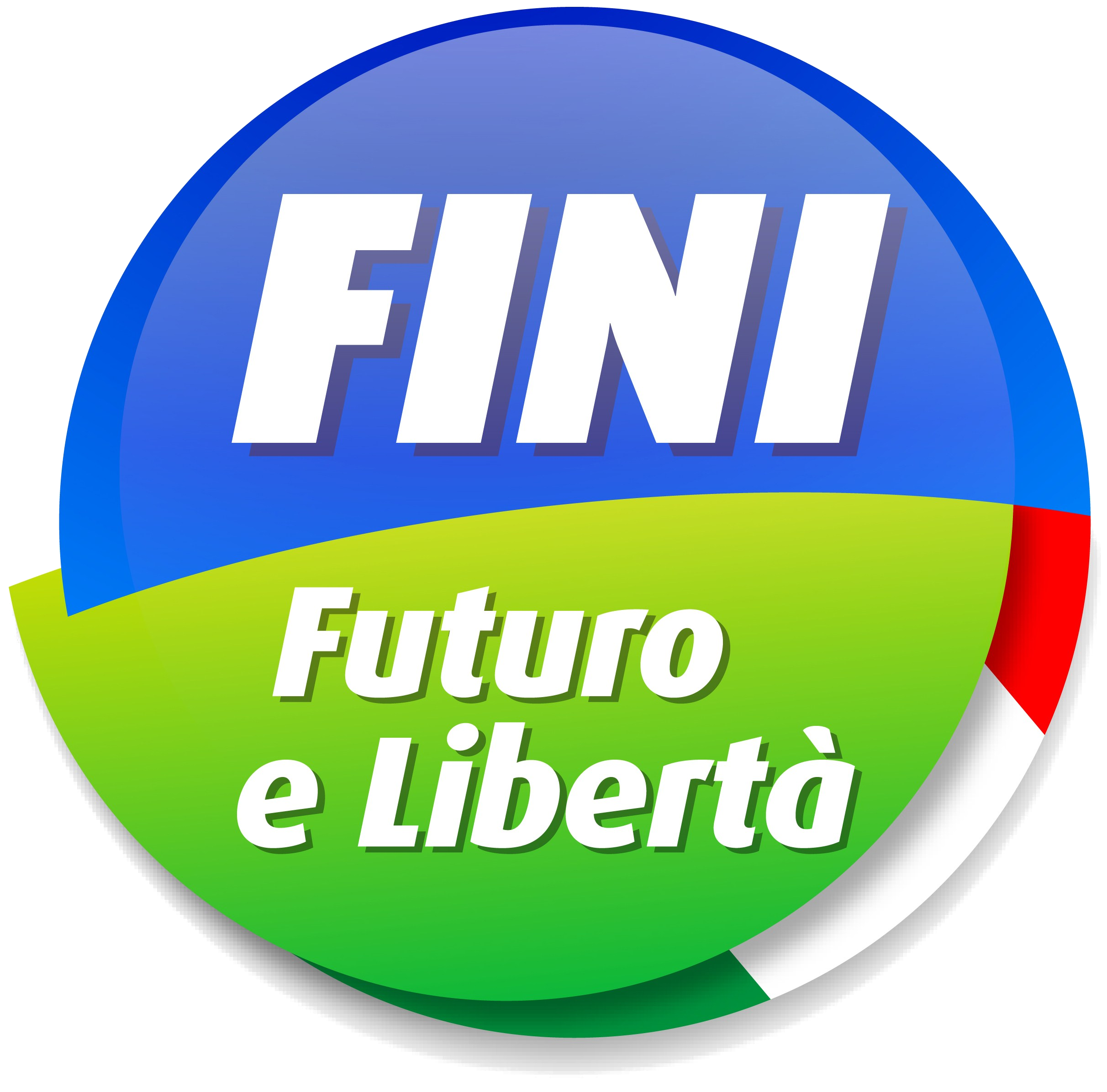
- President: Gianfranco Fini
- Vice President: Italo Bocchino
- Coordinator: Adolfo Urso; Roberto Menia
- President of the National Assembly: Andrea Ronchi; Salvatore Tatarella
- Founded: 30 July 2010
- Dissolved: 2014 (de facto)
- Split from: The People of Freedom
- Headquarters: Via Poli 29, Rome
- Youth wing: Generation Future
- Ideology: Liberal conservatism National conservatism (minority)
- Political position: Centre-right
- National affiliation: New Pole for Italy (2010–12); With Monti for Italy (2012–13); Movement for National Alliance (2013)
- European Parliament group: European People's Party
- Colours: Blue

Future and Freedom (Italian: Futuro e Libertà), whose full name was Future and Freedom for Italy (Futuro e Libertà per l'Italia, abbreviated to FLI), was a political party in Italy, comprising both liberal and national conservative elements.

FLI was formed by followers of Gianfranco Fini in July 2010 as a split from The People of Freedom (PdL), the major Italian centre-right party of the time, led by Silvio Berlusconi. Fini, former leader of the Italian Social Movement (MSI) and National Alliance (AN) and co-founder of the PdL in 2009, had taken a long journey from post-fascism to become a liberal conservative. Soon after the PdL's foundation, he started to become a critic of Berlusconi's government and leadership style.

The core of FLI was constituted by Generation Italy (GI), led by Italo Bocchino, who was also appointed vice president of the party by Fini. FLI members were mostly former MSI/AN stalwarts, with some notable exceptions.

== History ==
=== Background ===
Somewhat surprisingly, Gianfranco Fini, former leader of the national-conservative National Alliance (AN) and President of the Chamber of Deputies, became the most influential representative of the socially liberal wing of the party due to his progressive views on stem cell research, end of life issues, advance health care directives and immigration. Fini was also an outspoken supporter of the principle of separation of church and state and became also a vocal critic of Silvio Berlusconi and of his leadership style of the country and the party.

Fini's positions distanced him from most former leading members of AN (including Ignazio La Russa, Maurizio Gasparri, Gianni Alemanno, Altero Matteoli and Giorgia Meloni) who became close allies of Berlusconi instead.

In the meantime, a group of Fini loyalists, known as Finiani, started to join forces in support of their leader. In April 2010 Italo Bocchino launched an association within the PdL named Generation Italy in order to better represent Fini's views within the party and push for a different party organisation. Fini posed a sort of ultimatum to Berlusconi and hinted the formation of separate groups from the PdL in Parliament. At one point some Finiani even proposed the formation of a new party outside the PdL. After some tense days emerged as a possibility that Fini and his group would have remained in the party as a minority faction. On 22 April 2010 the National Committee of the PdL convened in Rome for the first time in a year. The conflict between Fini and Berlusconi was covered live by television. A resolution which denounced Fini's conduct and reaffirmed the party's political line was approved by a landslide margin by the assembly.

=== Split from the PdL ===
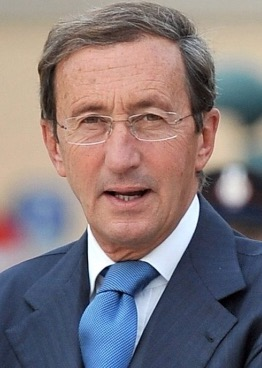
Gianfranco Fini

Clashes between Fini and Berlusconi became even more frequent and reached their heights in late July 2010, when Fini questioned the morality of some PdL party bigwigs under investigation. On 29 July 2010 the executive of the PdL released a document (voted by 33 members out of 37) in which Fini was described as "incompatible" with the political line of the PdL and unable to perform his job of President of the Chamber of Deputies in a neutral way. Berlusconi asked Fini to step down from his post and the executive proposed the suspension from party membership of three Finiani hard-liners (Italo Bocchino, Fabio Granata and Carmelo Briguglio) who had harshly criticised Berlusconi and accused some party members of criminal offences.

On 30 July, Fini held a press conference during which he announced the formation of separate groups from the PdL both in the Chamber and the Senate under the name Future and Freedom for Italy (FLI). He also confirmed the support of his group, which counted a handful of cabinet members, to Berlusconi's government. 33 deputies and 10 senators joined the new parliamentary groups from the beginning. Only a minority of the PdL MPs originating from National Alliance followed their former leader Fini into the new party, but enough to hold the balance in the Chamber of Deputies Moreover, some members of the former Forza Italia, Berlusconi's party before its merger into the PdL, joined too (Benedetto Della Vedova and Barbara Contini).

On 5 July, the Chamber voted on the suspension of Giacomo Caliendo, a PdL senator under investigation, from his post of Undersecretary of Justice. The FLI group chose to abstain from the vote along with the Union of the Centre, Alliance for Italy and the Movement for the Autonomies, forming the so-called "area of responsibility". The motion was voted down, but it was a blow for the Berlusconi IV Cabinet, which retained its majority only through FLI's support.

During the vote on Caliendo, Chiara Moroni, a social democrat formerly of the New Italian Socialist Party and Forza Italia, announced that she was leaving the PdL group in order to join Fini's outfit. In a touching speech dedicated to her father Sergio Moroni, a Socialist who committed suicide during Tangentopoli, she explained that she was leaving the PdL in the name of garantismo (an Italian word for "protection of civil liberties" used in relation to the right to a fair trial). For this she was vehemently criticised by senior former Socialists in the PdL such as Fabrizio Cicchitto and Margherita Boniver.

On 5 September, after a month of silence, Fini gave a speech to his supporters during the Festa Tricolore in Mirabello, a traditional rally of the old MSI and, later, of the AN. During that speech Fini declared that the PdL was dead and that his group would not have returned into the PdL's fold, but he did not speak about the transformation of FLI into an official party. Moreover, despite being very critical of Berlusconi, he offered a "legislative pact" in order for the government to continue until 2013. As a response, Berlusconi and his junior partner in government Umberto Bossi reiterated their call to Fini to resign from his post of President of the Chamber. Subsequently, on 8 September, Fini left the PdL group in the Chamber and joined to all intents and purposes FLI, becoming its 36th member.

=== Road to the new party ===
On 22 September FLI abstained during a secret confidence vote on Nicola Cosentino, an Undersecretary of Economy under investigation for camorra-related crimes. The motion was rejected by a larger majority than expected, meaning than some Finiani and possibly some deputies from the opposition.

On 24 September Souad Sbai left FLI and returned into the fold of the PdL parliamentary group. However, on the same day, Giampiero Catone, a former Christian Democrat who had been elected with the PdL on behalf of Gianfranco Rotondi's Christian Democracy for Autonomies, joined FLI.

On 29 September FLI voted yes in a vote of confidence to the government in the Chamber of Deputies, but two FLI deputies (Mirko Tremaglia and Fabio Granata) voted against. On the same day Fini announced the imminent birth of a new party.

On 2 November the party logo was presented during a press conference. The day after two more deputies joined the party: Roberto Rosso, a former Christian Democrat who had been leader of Forza Italia in Piedmont, and Daniele Toto. In Sicily the party joined forces with the remnants of the PdL–Sicily and formed an eight-strong group in the Regional Assembly in support of President Raffaele Lombardo.

On 7 November, during a crowded convention in Bastia Umbra, Fini asked Berlusconi to step down from his post of Prime Minister and proposed a new government including the Union of the Centre (UdC). Fini declared also that if Berlusconi were not to step down, FLI ministers and under-secretaries would leave the executive. As Berlusconi refused to do so, the four FLI members of the government resigned on 15 November.

On 14 December FLI voted against the government in a vote of confidence in the Chamber of Deputies, a vote won by Berlusconi by 314 to 311. Three FLI deputies (Giampiero Catone, Catia Polidori and Maria Grazia Siliquini) voted in favour (along with Giuseppe Angeli, who had left FLI and returned to the PdL in November), while another, Silvano Moffa, abstained from the vote and chose to leave the party. Subsequently, also Catone, Polidori and Siliquini left FLI.

On 15 December 2010 FLI was a founding member of the New Pole for Italy (NPI), along with the UdC and some minor parties.

=== Party foundation and defections ===
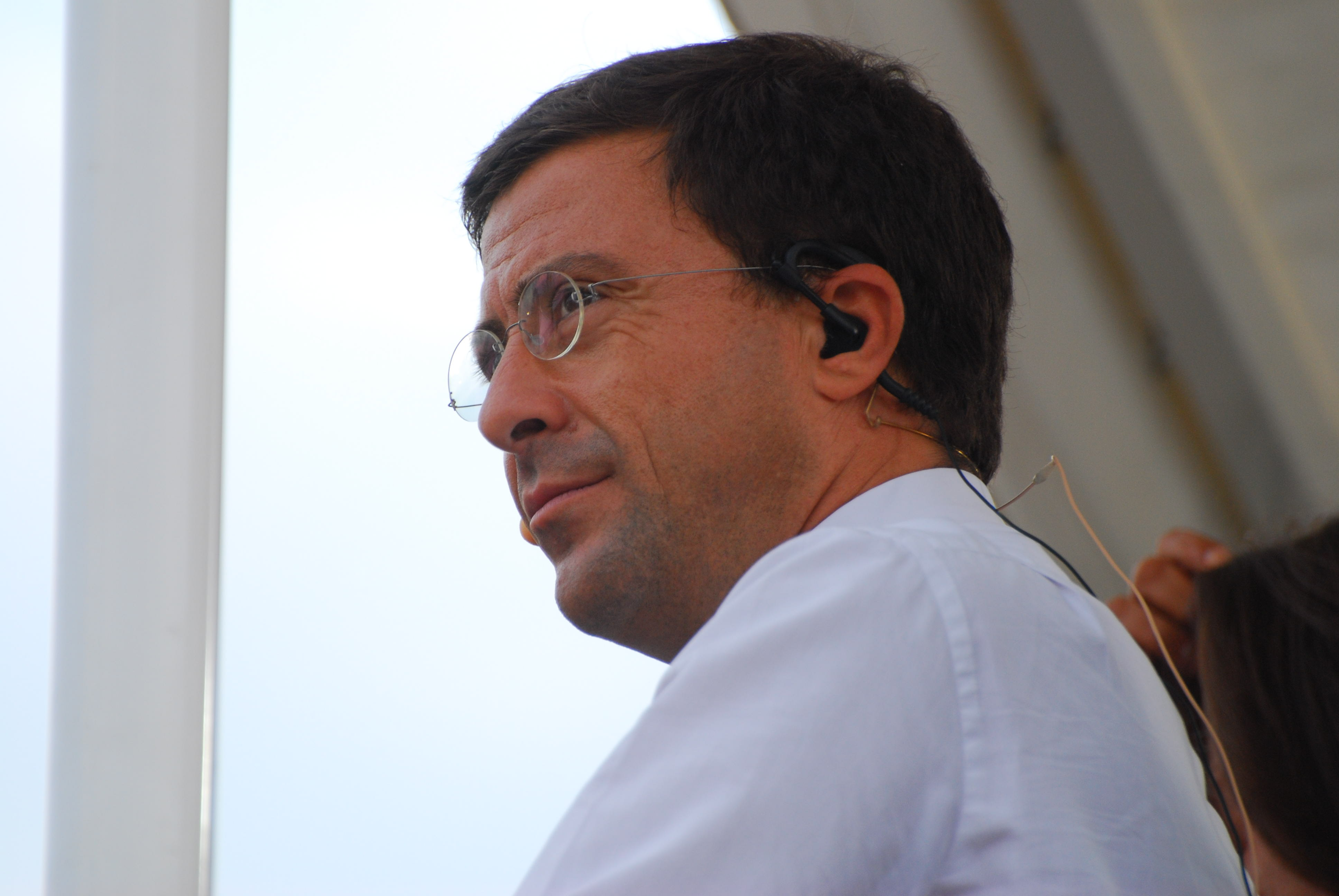
Italo Bocchino

On 11–13 February 2011 FLI was officially established as a party during a congress in Milan and Gianfranco Fini was elected president of it.

During the congress, no-one questioned the leadership of Fini, but the party was divided between "radicals" (Italo Bocchino, Benedetto Della Vedova, Fabio Granata, Carmelo Briguglio, Flavia Perina, etc.) and "moderates" (Adolfo Urso, Andrea Ronchi, Pasquale Viespoli, Mario Baldassarri and most senators), who strongly opposed the rise of Bocchino to party leadership. Fini finally appointed Bocchino vice president, downgraded Urso to spokesperson, appointed another "radical", Della Vedova, at the head of the party in the Chamber of Deputies, while Viespoli, a "moderate", was confirmed as leader in the Senate. This caused outrage among the "moderates", and Urso and Viespoli were especially critical of Fini's choices.

On 15 February Viespoli resigned from the position of Senate floor leader, but was immediately re-elected by the 10 FLI senators with a new mandate: ensuring the centre-right credentials of the group. On 16 February senator Giuseppe Menardi quit the party. On 17 February he was followed by senator Francesco Pontone and deputy Roberto Rosso, who both returned to the PdL. On 19 February also deputy Luca Bellotti left to re-join the PdL. On 20 February it was the turn of deputy Luca Barbareschi, formerly a "radical". On 22 February Pasquale Viespoli and Maurizio Saia, both senators, left the party too and the senatorial group was dissolved. Viespoli, Menardi and Saia, along with other like-minded senators like Adriana Poli Bortone (I the South), formed a new centre-right group called National Cohesion and returned into the fold of the majority. On 16 February one more deputy, Giulia Cosenza, walked out and returned to the PdL.

The party experienced more internal troubles in April 2011, in the run-up to local elections. Some leading members of the party disagreed with some candidatures decided by the party's national leadership, notably in Latina and Naples. This finally led MEP Enzo Rivellini to step down from the regional leadership in Campania and leave the party. Another MEP, Potito Salatto, and one senator, Candido De Angelis, left their leadership posts too. In the meantime the party's "moderates", led Urso and Ronchi, launched their own faction, FareItalia, open to members of all the centre-right parties, from the PdL to UDC. In May Ronchi resigned from president of the party's national assembly. In June Ronchi, along with Urso and Giuseppe Scalia (Sicilian leader of FLI), left the party.

On 30 December 2011 Mirko Tremaglia, a veteran of the Italian Social Republic and a historic figure in the history of MSI and AN, died.

=== Dissolution ===
In the 2013 general election, held in February 2013, the party ran as part of the With Monti for Italy alliance with the UdC and Civic Choice and obtained a mere 0.4% of the vote, returning no seats in the Chamber and one in the Senate, plus two elects by Italians abroad. Subsequently, Fini resigned from party president. It was also decided that, under the leadership of Roberto Menia, FLI would reconnect with the other wings of the former AN in order to recompose the Italian right. As a result, the party decided to support Gianni Alemanno, a former AN bigwig, as mayor in the run-off of Rome municipal election.

In the following months, several FLI members left the party. Benedetto Della Vedova, Aldo Di Biagio and Maria Ida Germontani joined SC (Della Vedova was appointed spokesperson), Fabio Granata and Flavia Perina joined Green Italia, Carmelo Briguglio re-joined Alemanno in Italy First, Francesco Divella launched Protagonist Apulia, Potito Salatto joined forces with the UdC aiming at forming a joint party on the European People's Party's model, etc. What remained of the party started to cooperate with The Right, Tricolour Flame, I the South and other right-wing parties and people in order to form a "new National Alliance". In the meantime, most members of the former AN had either returned into the PdL's fold or joined Brothers of Italy, a party led by Giorgia Meloni and Ignazio La Russa which was granted by the "National Alliance Foundation" of the permission to use AN's name and symbol in December 2013.

In the 2014 Piedmontese regional election FLI ran with The Right and the Social Right into United Right, but the joint list obtained no seats.

FLI was officially disbanded sometime between 2013 and 2014. Fini, who was not a member of the Chamber of Deputies for the first time in thirty years and was one of the few incumbent Presidents not to be returned to Parliament, continued his political activity through an association named FreeRight.

== Ideology and factions ==
The ideology of Future and Freedom stretched from national conservatism to liberal conservatism, but some of its leading members had a strong taste for social liberalism. Its core issues include the defense of national unity, suspicion of federal reform and the development of Southern Italy.

The core of FLI was constituted by Generation Italy (GI), to which a majority of FLI deputies and senators are affiliated, but also the other two factions of the arcipelago finiano (National Area and Open Space) are represented. On the cultural side, the FareFuturo foundation and Secolo d'Italia newspaper are very influential.

Most FLI members come from the post-fascist tradition of the Italian Social Movement (MSI) and National Alliance (AN) with some notable exceptions: Benedetto Della Vedova (a former Radical, who was elected deputy for Forza Italia, FI, and was later the leader of the Libertiamo association), Barbara Contini (a former Governor of Nasiriyah, Iraq elected for FI), Chiara Moroni (a former Socialist, later member of FI), Giuseppe Valditara (a former member of Lega Nord), Giulia Bongiorno, Alessandro Ruben and a handful of former Christian Democrats. However most FLI members are Southern conservatives or MSI nostalgics worried by the growing influence of Lega Nord over the centre-right, federal reform and economic liberalism. The party was actually very heterogeneous, and it was possible to identify some divisions either over politics or policies.

First, on the relations with the PdL, at the beginning there was a clear divide between a "radical" wing (Italo Bocchino, Fabio Granata, Carmelo Briguglio, Flavia Perina, Luca Barbareschi and most deputies) and a "moderate" one (Andrea Ronchi, Pasquale Viespoli, Roberto Menia and most senators). Some (the "moderates" and Adolfo Urso) long continued to consider themselves as part of the PdL, while others (the "radicals" and Menia) wanted FLI to be autonomous from the PdL. Shortly before launching the new party, Fini sided with the "radicals" and criticized the "moderates". Many "moderates", most of the former Christian Democrats and even "radical" Barbareschi left the party along the way. Some "moderates" led by Urso and Ronchi launched FareItalia, others directly re-joined the PdL.

Second, while some Finiani (Bocchino, Granata, etc.) see FLI as the embryo of a modern and innovative right-wing, others (Menia, Urso, etc.) have joined FLI in order to re-create the political community of the late MSI. In this sense the word "future" in the party's name was a reference to futurism, which was a cultural inspiration for Italian Fascism. Both progressive and reactionary forces thus hail from FLI, but almost none identifies with the political centre.

Third, on the economy, the predominant strain in FLI was highly influenced by dirigisme, statism, corporatism and centralism (all well represented in the ideology of the former MSI). Salvatore Merlo writes that "though Fini would never admit it ... many of the positions adopted by him today derive from a certain thread in fascist culture" and The Economist remarks that "many of Mr Fini's fellow-rebels originated in the social wing of neo-fascism, whose anti-capitalist adherents embraced such ideas as feminism and environmentalism as long ago as the 1970s", that was why FLI "has perhaps the oddest pedigree of any progressive group on the European right". However, FLI included also some uncompromising economic liberals such as Benedetto Della Vedova, his fellow former Radicals and the Libertiamo faction and foundation. Moreover, some Finiani, notably including Mario Baldassarri, propose to lower taxes and to slow down the introduction of fiscal federalism instead.

Fourth, on ethical issues, which caused some of the main strifes between Fini and the majority of the PdL and of the former AN, some FLI members such as Della Vedova were pushing for a progressive commitment aimed at the introduction of civil unions and the liberalisation of artificial insemination, while others did not consider those issues a priority or oppose any departure from the traditional social conservatism of MSI/AN.

== Electoral results ==
=== Italian Parliament ===
Chamber of Deputies
Election year	# of overall votes	% of overall vote	# of overall seats won	+/–	Leader
2013	159,429 (#12)	0.5	1 / 630	–	Gianfranco Fini

Senate of the Republic
Election year	# of overall votes	% of overall vote	# of overall seats won	+/–	Leader
2013	into With Monti for Italy	–	2 / 315	–	Gianfranco Fini

== Symbols ==
Official logo

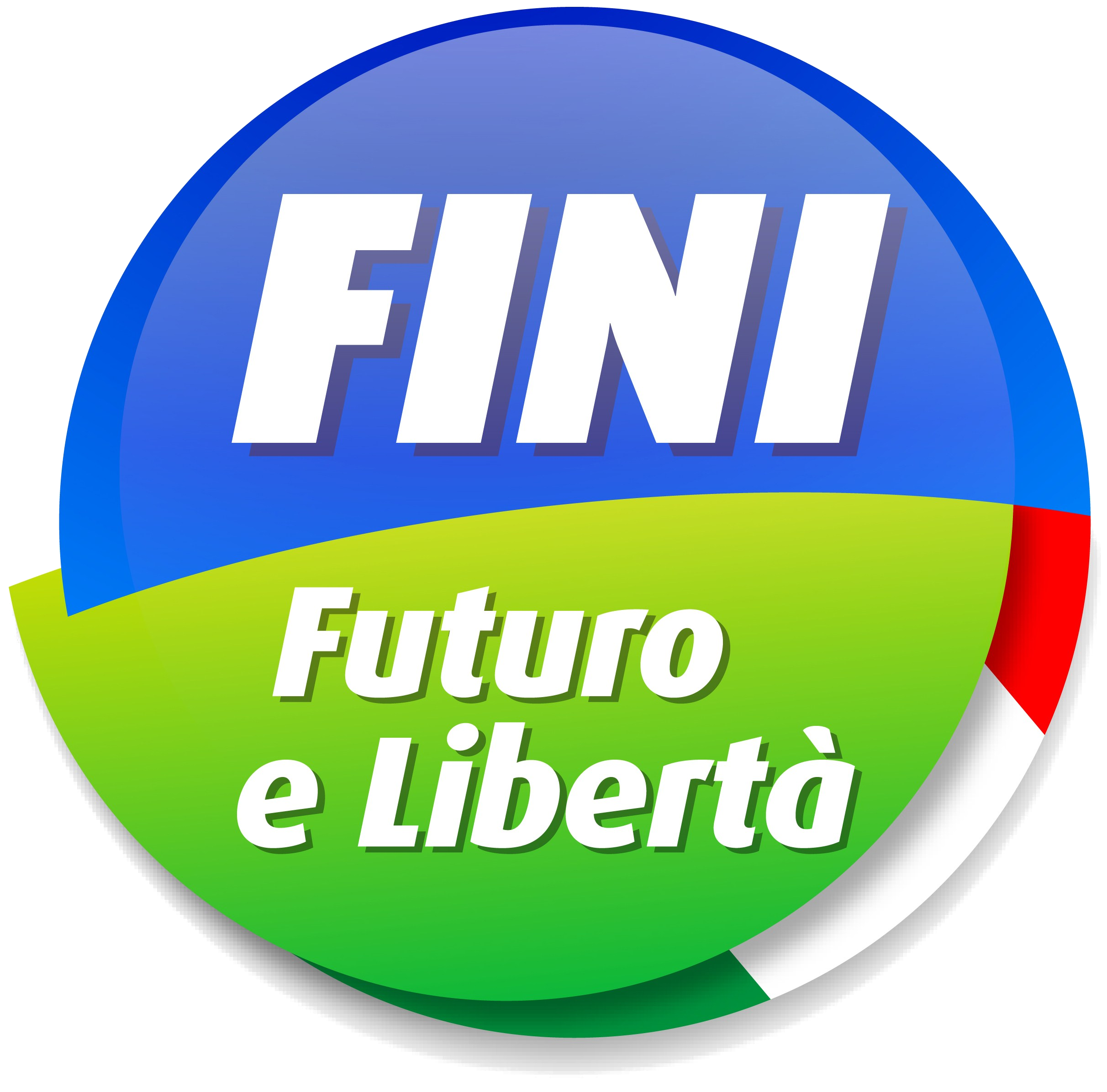
Electoral logo

== Leadership ==
- President: Gianfranco Fini (2011–2013)
- Vice President: Italo Bocchino (2011–2013)
  - Coordinator: Adolfo Urso (2010–2011), Roberto Menia (2011–2014)
  - Spokesperson: Silvano Moffa (2010), Benedetto Della Vedova (2010–2011), Giulia Bongiorno (2012–2013)
- President of the National Assembly: Andrea Ronchi (2011), Salvatore Tatarella (2011–2014)
- Party Leader in the Chamber of Deputies: Italo Bocchino (2010–2011), Benedetto Della Vedova (2011–2013)
- Party Leader in the Senate: Pasquale Viespoli (2010–2011), Candido De Angelis (2011–2013)
- Party Leader in the European Parliament: Cristiana Muscardini (2010–2012)
