= Salvatore Tatarella =

Italian politician (1947–2017)

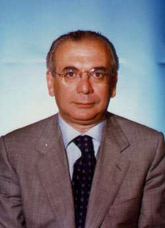
Salvatore Tatarella

Salvatore Tatarella (11 October 1947 – 28 January 2017) was an Italian politician.

== Biography and career ==
Graduated in law at the University of Bari, in 1972 he became a member of the central committee of the Italian Social Movement. From 1993 to 1999 he was Mayor of Cerignola and in the 1994 European Parliament election he was elected MEP. In 1999 he resigned as MEP and was candidate to the Chamber of Deputies in the supplementary election of Bari, in the vacant district for the death of his brother Pinuccio, and he was elected. In the 2001 Italian general election he was candidate in the district of Cerignola, but he wasn't re-elected.

In the European Parliament Election of 2004 he was again elected MEP with National Alliance for the Southern electoral district, and in the 2009 European Parliament election he was re-elected with The People of Freedom. In 2010 he left the PdL and joined Future and Freedom, the new party of Gianfranco Fini. He sat on the European Parliament's Committee on the Environment, Public Health and Food Safety. He also was a substitute for the Committee on Transport and Tourism, a member of the Delegation for relations with Iran and a substitute for the Delegation for relations with Mercosur countries.

Tatarella died on 28 January 2017 at the age of 69.
