= Popular Action (Italy) =

Italian political party

Popular Action (Azione Popolare, AP) was a conservative political party in Italy.

It was founded by Silvano Moffa as an association of former members of National Alliance who left Future and Freedom to return into the centre-right fold in late 2010. Moffa has been also leader of the group of People and Territory in the Italian Chamber of Deputies since 2011.

In 2012 AP formed Cantiere Popolare along with The Populars of Italy Tomorrow, the Christian Movement of Workers and the Extended Christian Pact.

== Leadership ==
- President: Silvano Moffa (2010–2012)
- Vice President: Gennaro Malgieri (2011–2012)
