= Giulia Cosenza =

Italian politician (born 1968)

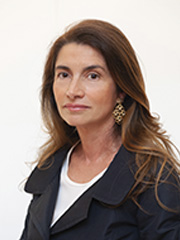
- Cosenza in 2022

Member of the Senate
- Incumbent
- Assumed office 13 October 2022
- Constituency: Campania – 02

Member of the Chamber of Deputies
- In office 28 April 2006 – 15 March 2013
- Constituency: Campania 2

Personal details
- Born: 25 January 1968 (age 58)
- Party: Brothers of Italy (since 2013)

Giulia Cosenza (born 25 January 1968) is an Italian politician serving as a member of the Senate since 2022. From 2006 to 2013, she was a member of the Chamber of Deputies.
