= Francesco Rutelli =

Italian politician (born 1954)

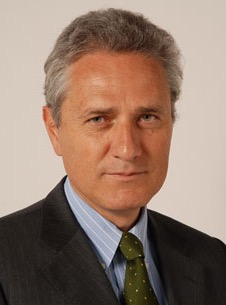

Deputy Prime Minister of Italy
- In office 17 May 2006 – 8 May 2008
- Prime Minister: Romano Prodi
- Preceded by: Gianfranco Fini; Giulio Tremonti
- Succeeded by: Angelino Alfano

Minister of Cultural Heritage
- In office 17 May 2006 – 8 May 2008
- Prime Minister: Romano Prodi
- Preceded by: Rocco Buttiglione
- Succeeded by: Sandro Bondi

Minister of the Environment
- In office 28 April 1993 – 4 May 1993
- Prime Minister: Carlo Azeglio Ciampi
- Preceded by: Valdo Spini
- Succeeded by: Valdo Spini

Mayor of Rome
- In office 6 December 1993 – 8 January 2001
- Preceded by: Franco Carraro
- Succeeded by: Walter Veltroni
Parliamentary offices
Member of the Senate
In office 29 April 2008 – 14 March 2013
Constituency	Umbria
Member of the Chamber of Deputies
In office 30 May 2001 – 28 April 2008
Constituency	Rome
In office 23 April 1992 – 14 January 1994
Constituency	Rome
In office 12 July 1983 – 5 July 1990
Constituency	Rome (1983–1987); Naples (1987–1990)

Personal details
- Born: 14 June 1954 (age 72) Rome, Italy
- Party: PR (1972–1989); VA (1989–1990); FdV (1990–1999); Dem (1999–2002); DL (2002–2007); PD (2007–2009); ApI (2009–2016); PDE (since 2016)
- Spouse: Barbara Palombelli (m. 1982)
- Education: University of Rome La Sapienza

Francesco Rutelli (born 14 June 1954) is an Italian journalist and former politician who is the president of ANICA National Association of Film and Audiovisual Industry since October 2016 and re-elected for the 2020–2022 term, plus ANICA Servizi. He is the legal representative of MIA (Italian Audiovisual Market). He also chairs the Centro per un Futuro Sostenibile (Centre for a Sustainable Future), a bipartisan think tank on climate change and environmental issues).

Rutelli was for 15 years co-president of the European Democratic Party, a centrist European political party. He has been Mayor of Rome 1994–2001, and president of the centrist party Democracy is Freedom – The Daisy 2002–2007. He was the Deputy Prime Minister and Minister of Culture and Tourism in the second cabinet of Prime Minister Romano Prodi 2006–2008. He also chairs Incontro di Civiltà (Civilizations Meeting); Videocittà, Moving Images Festival (Rome, 2018–2019); and Priorità Cultura (Culture First), which gathers outstanding Italian personalities, engaged on Heritage conservation and promotion, contemporary arts, public-private partnership in the many fields of culture.

== Biography ==
Born in Rome, Rutelli entered politics joining the Radical Party, for which he was then elected secretary in 1980, aged 26. With the Radicals, Rutelli championed humanitarian and libertarian policies such as unilateral disarmament, abolition of nuclear power plants, conscientious objection to the compulsory national service, eradication of world hunger, decriminalisation of the use of cannabis. At those times the political action of the Italian Radicals was self-defined as inspired by the Gandhian non-violent movement.

First elected as deputy in 1983, confirming his office in 1987 and 1992, he then joined the Federation of the Greens in the late 1980s, becoming one of the party's leading figures, and developing new environmental campaigns. He was then chosen as Ministry of Environment and Urban Areas in 1993, although he resigned after one day in the post. That same year, he was first elected Mayor of Rome as centre-left coalition candidate, defeating centre-right candidate Gianfranco Fini. Being reelected in 1997, with 985.000 popular votes, the highest in the history of the City, Rutelli held the position until 2001. He also served as a member of European Parliament from 1999 to 2004. There he's been committed to promote initiatives for the abolition of death penalty, freedom of information improvement, and against corruption.

From the mid-1990s onwards, his views appeared increasingly moderate. Rutelli was defeated by Silvio Berlusconi in the 2001 general election as Prime Minister candidate for the centre-left Olive Tree coalition, gathering 16.4 million votes, against 16.9 million of the right wing coalition. He was also one of the founders of the Democrats, which became part of Democracy is Freedom – The Daisy. Rutelli led the party until it merged into the Democratic Party on 14 October 2007. Rutelli's role in the Daisy – a party with strong ties with Italian Christian heritage – is considered by his opponents a singular upshot after a fairly erratic journey within Italian progressive politics, mainly because of his past social-libertarian and green experiences.

In 2006, Rutelli was named Deputy Prime Minister and Minister for Culture in the cabinet of Romano Prodi during Prodi's second term as Italian Prime Minister. In February 2008 he announced his intention to run again as mayor of Rome leading a local centre-left coalition, but lost the local elections on 28 April 2008 against centre-right Gianni Alemanno.

In October 2009 he announced his intention to leave the Democratic Party. After leaving the Democratic Party, he co-founded the Alliance for Italy (ApI), a centrist, liberal party which ran joint lists with the Union of the Centre (UdC) in most regions in the regional elections of March 2010. In December 2010, the ApI became a founding member of the new centrist formation New Pole for Italy, and Rutelli became one of the new group's main leaders, along with UdC leader Pier Ferdinando Casini and Gianfranco Fini, the leader of the Future and Freedom party and former leader of the post-fascist Italian Social Movement and the national-conservative National Alliance, until 2012.

Rutelli was again elected to the Chamber of Deputies in 2001 and 2006, and to the Senate in 2008, when he became the Chairman of COPASIR (Parliamentary Committee of Overview on Intelligence), where he drafted and published reports on human trafficking as a strategic threat, and the first Report to the Parliament and the Government on Cyberspace and its implications for national security.

== International ==
Rutelli founded the European Democratic Party, together with the French political leader François Bayrou. He was unanimously voted co-president of the party (2004-2019). The members of the EDP in the European Parliament sit in the ALDE Group (Alliance of Democrats and Liberals) and then the Renew Group. At the end of the 1990s he was member of the Committee of Regions, where he chaired the Urban Policies Committee, and was an Advisor for Urban Development to the former UN Secretary-General Boutros Boutros Ghali. He is now the President of the political foundation affiliated to the EDP, the Institute of European Democrats.

Rutelli was elected to the European Parliament (1999-2004), sitting in the ALDE Group, introducing Reports and many Parliamentary initiatives. He has been one of the main promoter of the Referendum for a stronger integration between Italy and the EU (held in 1989, with an overwhelming YES vote – 88%); he has been awarded the Crocodile-Altiero Spinelli Prize, as a proEuropean personality. Serving in the Italian Parliament, he has been member of the Foreign Affairs Committee. He also chaired for two terms the Human Rights Committee in the Chamber of Deputies.

Rutelli got a Diploma in International Organizations from the Italian Society for International Organization, SIOI. He also has been the Honorary President (2013-2014) of the Institute for Cultural Diplomacy (Berlin). He promoted the "Cultural and Creative Industries Italy-China " Forums (Beijing, 2014; Milan, Venice, 2015). He co-chaired (2015) the Silk Road Cities Alliance (Beijing). Rutelli quit University in 1977; 40 years later, at the age of 62, a degree in Landscape and environmental planning and design, with highest grade and honors by Università La Sapienza and Tuscia University.

== Culture ==
His family has ancestral ties with culture and the arts, rooted in the regions of Marche, Emilia, Sicily and Rome. Mario Rutelli (his great-grandfather) was the author of the Najadi Fountain in Rome (1901), the Anita Garibaldi's Monument, and dozens of public and private sculptures; among them, some of the most important monuments in Palermo (Sicily). Another great-grandfather, Felice Martini from Parma, was the Architect of the latest renovation (1873) of the historic Arsenale in Venice. Grandfather Ottavio Marini was the Director of Antiquities and Belle Arti of the Italian Government (1910s-1920s). The Rutelli family, in Palermo, is associated to many relevant developments: the construction of Teatro Massimo, the buildings in via Roma and on the seaside, Mondello's liberty buildings.

In the last twenty years, as Mayor of Rome and, furtherly, as Minister of Culture, Francesco Rutelli has contributed to the creation and development of many crucial infrastructures, cultural institutions, museums and galleries in Italy. Among them, the Auditorium-Città della Musica (an institution awaited in Rome for 60 years, designed by Renzo Piano), the MAXXI Museum, the new Ara Pacis shrine/museum, a vast restoration and archeological excavation program and the opening of over 20 museums and exhibition spaces in Rome, including the National Gallery of Ancient Art, the Civic Gallery of Modern Art (later renamed MACRO) and the Scuderie del Quirinale complex. He oversaw the restoration of San Carlo Theatre (Naples) and Petruzzelli Theatre (Bari), the construction of the new Maggio Fiorentino Auditorium (Florence), the radical restructuring of Museo Archeologico di Reggio Calabria and the conclusion of the Reggia di Venaria (Torino) restoration. He enacted a new Landscape Code and a new tax credit/tax shelter system that revitalized the movie industry. He established the Teatro Festival in Naples and re-launched the International Festival of Spoleto. He promoted the first (and only) White Book on Italian creative industries.

Rutelli led a significant Cultural Diplomacy strategy for Italy, and through successful negotiations managed the recovery of priceless stolen crafts and historical masterpieces, in the UNESCO Conventions framework, in cooperation with international museums and cultural institutions, developing new agreements on lending policies and scientific cooperation. In 2016, Olivetti Company, owned by TIM-Telecom, asked Francesco Rutelli to chair the Olivetti Design Contest, devoted to award young Italian designers.

== Personal life ==
Rutelli is married to Barbara Palombelli, a radio (Rai Radio 2) and television journalist for the Italian broadcasting company Mediaset; they have four children, 3 of which are adopted. After a period of skepticism, now he considers himself Catholic. He is the great-grandson of Mario Rutelli. Rutelli is a supporter of Roman football club SS Lazio.

== Electoral history ==
Election	House	Constituency	Party	Votes	Result
1983	Chamber of Deputies	Rome–Viterbo–Latina–Frosinone	PR	3,648	Elected
1987	Chamber of Deputies	Naples–Caserta	PR	16,040	Elected
1989	European Parliament	Central Italy	VA	17,606	Not elected
1992	Chamber of Deputies	Rome–Viterbo–Latina–Frosinone	FdV	10,900	Elected
2001	Chamber of Deputies	Rome – Prenestino Labicano	Ulivo	36,457	Elected
2006	Chamber of Deputies	Lazio 1	Ulivo	– (Note: Elected in a closed list proportional representation system.)	Elected
2008	Senate of the Republic	Umbria	PD	–	Elected

Political offices
Preceded by Franco Carraro	Mayor of Rome; 1993–2001	Succeeded by Walter Veltroni
Preceded by Rocco Buttiglione	Minister of Culture and Tourism; 2006–2008	Succeeded by Sandro Bondi
Preceded by Gianfranco Fini	Deputy Prime Minister of Italy; 2006–2008; Served alongside: Massimo D'Alema	Succeeded by Angelino Alfano
Preceded by Giulio Tremonti	Deputy Prime Minister of Italy; 2006–2008; Served alongside: Massimo D'Alema	Succeeded by Angelino Alfano
Preceded by Claudio Scajola	President of COPASIR; 2008–2010	Succeeded by Massimo D'Alema
Party political offices
New title	President of Democracy Is Freedom – The Daisy; 2002–2007	Office abolished
New title	President of Alliance for Italy since 2009	Incumbent
