= Silvano Moffa =

Italian journalist and politician

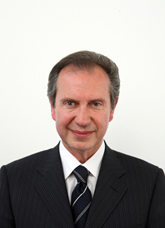

President of the Province of Rome
- In office 29 November 1998 – 25 May 2003
- Preceded by: Giorgio Fregosi
- Succeeded by: Enrico Gasbarra

Member of the Chamber of Deputies
- In office 28 April 2006 – 14 March 2013
- Constituency: Lazio 1

Personal details
- Born: 21 April 1951 (age 75) Rome, Italy
- Party: MSI (1970–1995); AN (1995–2009); PdL (2009–2010); FLI (2010); AP (2011–2012); CP (since 2012)
- Profession: Politician, journalist

Silvano Moffa (born 21 April 1951 in Rome, Italy) is an Italian politician and journalist.

== Biography ==
Moffa joined the Italian Social Movement in 1970 and in 1973 he was elected municipal councilor in Colleferro. In 1975 he became journalist of the newspaper Secolo d'Italia, of which he became editor-in-chief in 1977. He left the newspaper in 1989 to devote himself more to politics.

In 1993 Moffa was elected Mayor of Colleferro with the 51.0% of the vote and he was reconfirmed in 1997, with the 66.5% of the vote. He remained Mayor of Colleferro until 2001. In 1998 he was also elected President of Province of Rome with the 51.1% of the vote, but he was defeated by Enrico Gasbarra. In 2004 he was elected for the third time Mayor of Colleferro, with the 50.6% of the vote.

On 30 December 2004 he was appointed Undersecretary to the Ministry of Infrastructure in the Berlusconi II Cabinet.

In 2006 Moffa was elected for the first time to the Chamber of Deputies with National Alliance, and he was re-elected in 2008 with The People of Freedom. On 30 July 2010 he left the PdL to join Future and Freedom, led by Gianfranco Fini. On 14 December 2010 Moffa, although he was signatory of the distrust motion to the Berlusconi IV Cabinet presented by FLI and other parties, following the vote in the Senate, he announced that he had never shared the line of no confidence, but that he would still have voted the distrust provided provided his request for Italo Bocchino's resignation as group leader had been accepted, but this request that was rejected. Moffa so decided not to appear in the Chamber for the vote and left FLI, to join the Mixed Group.

In 2011 Moffa founded Popular Action and joined the new parliamentary group Responsible Initiative (later "People and Territory").

In 2015 he again ran for mayor of Colleferro, but lost in the second ballot against the centre-left candidate Pierluigi Sanna.
