= Roberto Rosso =

Italian politician (born 1967)

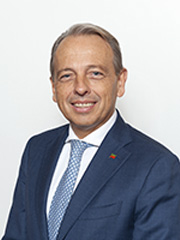
- Rosso in 2022

Member of the Senate
- Incumbent
- Assumed office 13 October 2022
- Constituency: Piedmont – P02

Member of the Chamber of Deputies
- In office 23 March 2018 – 12 October 2022
- Constituency: Piedmont 1 – U02

Personal details
- Born: 16 August 1967 (age 59)
- Party: Forza Italia

Roberto Rosso (born 16 August 1967) is an Italian politician serving as a member of the Senate since 2022. From 2018 to 2022, he was a member of the Chamber of Deputies.

== Biography ==
In 1995, he served as a member of the Piedmont Regional Council on the Lega Nord ticket, serving as the party’s group leader from 1996 to 1999, when he left the Northern League to join the mixed group. He remained a regional council member until 2000. A journalist, he served as vice president of Corecom Piedmont from 2006 to 2011.

In the 2018 general election, he was elected to the Chamber of Deputies as a member of Forza Italia. He has been a member of the Ninth Committee on Transportation, Postal Services, and Telecommunications since 2018. Since March 30, 2021, he has served as Vice Chair of the Forza Italia Caucus in the Chamber of Deputies.
