= Giuseppe Valditara =

Italian politician (born 1961)

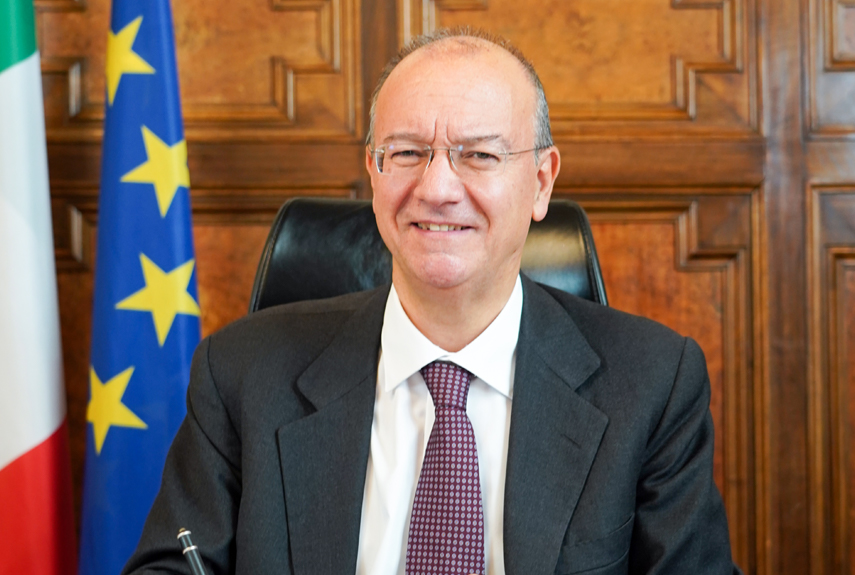
- Official portrait, 2022

Minister of Education and Merit
- Incumbent
- Assumed office 22 October 2022
- Prime Minister: Giorgia Meloni
- Preceded by: Patrizio Bianchi

Member of the Senate of the Republic
- In office 30 May 2001 – 14 March 2013
- Constituency: Lombardy

Personal details
- Born: 12 January 1961 (age 65) Milan, Italy
- Party: Lega (since 2022)
- Other political affiliations: AN (1995-2009); PdL (2009-2010); FLI (2010-2013)
- Education: University of Milan
- Occupation: University professor

Giuseppe Valditara (born 12 January 1961) is an Italian academic and politician. He has been the Italian Minister of Education and Merit in the Meloni Cabinet from 22 october 2022.

== Biography ==
Valditara was full professor of private and public Roman law at the Department of Law of the University of Turin. He was scientific director of the legal journal European Legal Studies published by the European University of Rome, as well as dean of the Law degree of the same university.

In 2001, he was elected senator for the center-right coalition and remained in office for three terms until 2013. He is now a member of the League.

On 22 October 2022, Valditara was sworn in as Minister of Education and Merit in the cabinet led by Giorgia Meloni.
