= Barbara Contini =

Italian politician

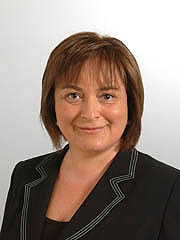
Barbara Contini

Barbara Contini (born 22 September 1961) is an Italian politician and an official of international organisations expert on international politics and security.

== Early life ==
Contini was born in Milan. She earned two BA in Political science and Japanese language at the University of Naples Federico II, then she obtained a master's degree in Business Management and Administration and several advanced courses in peacekeeping, crisis situations, humanitarian operations.

== Political career ==
From 2008 to 2013 she was an Italian senator elected with The People of Freedom, member of Defense Commission, member of Foreign Affairs Commission, member of Human Rights Commission, president Bilateral Parliamentary Association of Italy Iraq.

She started her international activity working with the United Nations Development Programme (UNDP) in 1988.

For almost thirty years she has worked in several countries.

She was Special Representative of the Italian Prime Minister for Darfur, Sudan, from 2004 to 2006.

She served as Governor of the Dhi Qar Province in Iraq, Nasiriyah, with the Coalition Provisional Authority led by ambassador Paul Bremer in Iraq, from 2003 to 2004.

She was Regional Director of the Organization for Security and Co-operation in Europe (OSCE) in Bosnia and Herzegovina from 1999 to 2002.

She was special international observer of the Organization for Security and Co-operation in Europe (OSCE) in Sarajevo from 1997 to 1999.

She speaks Italian, English, French, Spanish, Japanese, Serbo-Croatian, Arabic.

== In popular culture ==
File footage of Contini speaking on EuroNews about the invasion of Iraq was used in the 2005 film Caché (Hidden) starring Juliette Binoche.

| Preceded by Title jointly held | Member of the Italian Senate; 2009–2013 | Succeeded by Title jointly held |
