= Secolo d'Italia =

Italian online newspaper

- Type: Daily newspaper (1952–2012); Online newspaper (since 2012)
- Owner: Fondazione Alleanza Nazionale
- Editor-in-chief: Italo Bocchino
- Founded: 1952
- Political alignment: National conservatism Italian nationalism Post-fascism (since 1995); Formerly; Neo-fascism (1952–1995)
- Language: Italian
- Headquarters: Rome
- ISSN: 0391-6979
- Website: www.secoloditalia.it (in Italian)

Secolo d'Italia ([ˈsɛːkolo diˈtaːlja]; "Century of Italy") is a daily online newspaper. It was founded in Rome on May 16, 1952, as an independent right-wing newspaper. In 2012, it ceased its print edition and continued as an online-only conservative publication.

== Political and ideological context ==
After the war in Italy ended, various, small political organizations and parties adhering to variants of an extreme-right ideology were born. On 26 December 1946, the Italian Social Movement (Movimento Sociale Italiano or MSI) was created through the merging of various such entities. (Note: These parties were the Italian Movement of Social Unity (Movimento Italiano di Unità Sociale or MIUS) founded by Giorgio Almirante, former minister in the Italian Social Republic and former fascist veterans of the Italian Social Republic (RSI), the Front of the Italian (Fronte dell'Italiano), the Front of Work' (Fronte del Lavoro), the Trade Union of Italian Railwaymen (Unione Sindacale dei Ferrovieri Italiani) and the Independent Veterans Group (Gruppo Reduci Indipendenti). See Gennaccari (2006).) The three initial main objectives of the new party were to revive Mussolini's fascism, attack the Italian democratic regime, and defend the country against communism.

From the beginning, there was inherent tension within the MSI between two tendencies: One placed anti-communism as the party's main stance and, therefore, declared itself open to or seeking alliances with all anti-communist parties and organizations, along with accepting the support of and aid from foreign sources that were similarly engaged, such as the United States and by extension NATO. Its adherents were labeled "Atlanticists" by proponents of the other tendency, which rejected any collaboration with forces, such as the Americans, which had fought against and defeated Fascist Italy. (Note: Carrying such views of "ideological purity", some elements within MSI started working to establish contact with former Nazis as well as neo-fascist groupings in Europe, and for this purpose they founded the Centro Studi Europei in Trieste, which started publishing the Europa Unita journal. See Bale (1994)) In this context, they also stood opposed to Italy's entry and participation in the North Atlantic Treaty Organization. (Note: Italy, in fact, became in 1949 one of the founding member-states NATO.) For these positions, they were characterized as "Leftists" within MSI. Essentially, it was a clash of priorities: between nationalism and anti-communism.

By the end of the 1940s, the MSI was characterized as "one of the largest and best organized neofascist electoral parties in Europe" as well as the eventual "pivotal party" for the re-emergence of the extreme right in Europe.

Since the beginning, there was throughout the party, and most strongly among the Evolani, "bitter hostility" towards the so-called "25 July 1943 traitors", which meant that many members stood opposed to bringing in any of the "ventennio-era Fascist hierarchs".

== Early years: with the MSI ==
Secolo d'Italia (Note: The newspaper was initially and for only one month titled as simply Secolo. See Terranova (2013)) was founded by Franz Turchi, World War I veteran, National Fascist Party official, and prefect of La Spezia during the time of the Italian Social Republic; its first issue appeared on 16 May 1952. At the beginning, the paper had five editors, among whom were the esotericista Aniceto Del Massa, and the poet Ezra Pound. The paper's first headquarters were in via Tomacelli 146, in Rome, the same address that some years later would also house the offices of Il Manifesto and Mondoperaio, as well as the Roman editorial staff of Corriere della Sera. The first chief editor was Bruno Spampanato, fascist author, Mussolini loyalist, and Decima Flottiglia MAS veteran. The editorial group was anti-American and opposed Italy's accession to NATO, supporting the "socialization of businesses" and rejecting the "right-wing" label. They also stood against any collaboration with Italy's monarchists or with conservative parties such as the Christian Democrats.

Junio Valerio Borghese, Mussolini loyalist, and decorated wartime veteran of the Decima, who had joined MSI in November 1952 at the invitation of its leadership, (Note: Borghese, at war's end, was helped by X2 officer of OSS James Angleton to escape the partisans active in the Milan region. He was arrested in Rome, tried, convicted, and, in 1945, sentenced to 12 years imprisonment for "collaboration" with the Nazis. He was not charged for war crimes, despite the ascertained massacres committed by La Decima during "anti-partisan operations". He was released from prison in 1949 by a Supreme Court of Cassation decision.The discount on his sentence was due to "[the defendant's] glorious expeditions during the war, his defence of north-east borders against Tito's IX Corps and his defence of Genoa harbour", per the court's decision. See Kisatsky (2005).) wrote the newspaper's first editorial. While Borghese's entry into MSI inspired the party's "leftist" and Evolani wings on account of his illustrious and fanatically fascist career, he immediately sided with the "Atlanticists", supporting the "unconditional adherence" to a "pro-Western" and "philo-American" foreign policy.

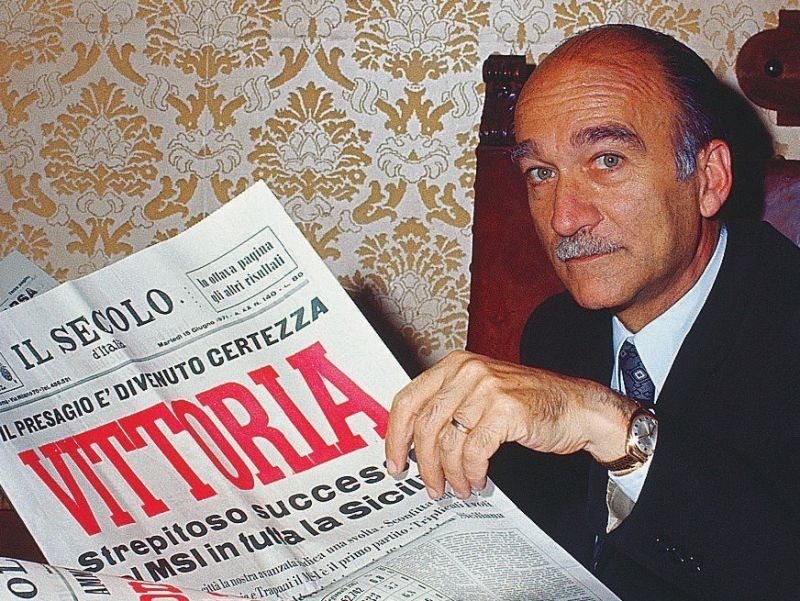
Almirante with the Secolo issue reporting MSI's result in the 1971 Sicilian regional election

The MSI party had no direct involvement in the founding of Secolo d'Italia. Its leadership initially expressed concerns over the paper's appearance and dispatched Roberto Mieville, head of the party's Centro Stampa e Propaganda, to various party sections and affiliated publications to inform them that Secolo had "obscure origins and even more obscure objectives." However, by that time, the pro-Atlantic current within MSI was asserting its dominance. In July 1952, Borghese gave the introductory speech at MSI's Third Congress held at L'Aquila, denying that the party was "totalitarian" and stating that the task of all missini was to "interpret the common aspirations" of the Italian people and resolve their economic problems. On 18 August 1952, Secolo d'Italia passed directly into the hands of MSI's Giorgio Almirante and Filippo Anfuso, with Franz Turchi appointed finance manager. After Almirante resigned from the leadership position, Augusto De Marsanich, another Mussolini loyalist, was elected in his place. Almirante opposed, at the time, what he determined as "the new conservatism" in far-right politics and emphasised "the proletarian origins of fascism." More radical cadres, such as Pino Rauti, who went on to create Ordine Nuovo, left MSI for the same reasons. Four years later, in 1954, De Marsanich was replaced by Arturo Michelini, with the positions supported by Secolo closely following the shifts inside Movimento; newspaper eventually adapted Michelini's strategy of inserimento (insertion) into the mainstream that resulted in MSI becoming, by the late 1950s, Italy's 4th largest party. Secolo d'Italia, during Michelini's leadership, supported the strategy of industrialist Enrico Mattei, chairman of state-owned Agip, who died in 1962 in an airplane accident. (Note: After World War II, Christian Democrat public administrator Enrico Mattei was given the task of dismantling the state-owned petroleum company Agip that had been established by the Fascist regime. Instead, Mattei enlarged and reorganized it into what became the National Fuel Trust conglomerate or ENI. He negotiated oil concessions in the Middle East as well as trade agreements with the Soviet Union, thus ostensibly breaking the oligopoly of the so-called "Seven Sisters" that dominated the mid-20th-century oil industry. In 1962, he died in an airplane accident under mysterious circumstances. See La Repubblicca (1994). See Firrao et al (2009).)

When Michelini died, in 1969, Almirante was re-elected leader of MSI. Improving on Michelini's inserimento, Almirante introduced a double-aim strategy of broadening the party's reach in both the conservative and the radical direction. He started a collaboration with the Monarchist National Party, invited back hard-liner Rauti and other radicals, and commenced tactical approaches to conservative figures within the Christian Democrats and the Liberals. The subsequent, increased popularity of MSI, (Note: Contesting the 1972 general election in a joint list with the Monarchists, the MSI, whose members numbered more than four hundred thousand, almost doubled its electoral support up to 8.7% of the votes, its highest score until that time. See Ruzza et al (2009).) broadened Secolo's readership as well, with daily sales reaching approximately 150,000 issues on average.

As soon as he became again MSI leader, in 1969, Almirante appointed as Secolo's editor-in-chief Antonino Tripodi, lawyer, MSI MP, and veteran of Mussolini's National Fascist Party, assigning him with the task of modernizing the paper's appearance through the use of new composition & printing technologies and of expanding its reporting on culture. Tripodi enlisted notable journalists of the far right, such as Alberto Giovannini, former editor of the fascist periodical L'Assalto ("Assault"), and creator of the short-lived post-war review Rosso e Nero ("Red and Black") that supported a "conciliation" between fascism and socialism. (Note: Giovannini went as far as inviting socialists such as, in the very first issue, Avanti! journalist Ugo Zatterin, to write opinion pieces for the review. In his letter, Zatterin highlighted the value of the position taken by many former fascists who, rejecting at least in part their ideology, declared that they recognize themselves in the republican regime. The letter was strongly criticized by the socialist leadership and its author was suspended for several months from Avanti!, from which he then resigned. See Vallauri (2001).)

On 12 March 1980, Secolo employee and MSI member Angelo Mancia was killed by two gunmen near his home. The group Compagni organizzati in volante rossa, with a phone call to La Repubblica, assumed the responsibility for the "anti-fascist" action. The assassination was considered to be in retaliation for the killing of Autonomia Operaia member Valerio Verbano, a few weeks before, by three unidentified gunmen, generally suspected to be neo-fascist militants.

Tripodi stayed on until 1982, upon which time he was elected leader of MSI and Alberto Giovannini was promoted to the position of Secolo's chief editor.

== Transition to the Alleanza ==
When Giorgio Almirante died in May 1988, Gianfranco Fini was elected MSI secretary, defeating Pino Rauti, who was then deputy-secretary. After Rauti's January 1990 election to the top position, Fini returned, in July 1991, as party secretary. Four years later, in January 1995, the party's congress in Fiuggi decided to merge the MSI with conservative elements of the disbanded Christian Democrats and form the National Alliance party (Alleanza Nazionale or AN), with Fini assuming its presidency. (Note: This turning point in MSI history came to be known as svolta di Fiuggi. See Eatwell (1997).) The new party distanced itself from fascism, with Fini stating that there would not and could not be "any return to fascism" and disavowing AN supporters who used the fascist salute. In 1994, author Gennaro Malgieri was appointed Secolo's chief editor, joined as co-chief editor, in 1998, by Marcello Staglieno, Lega Nord MP and former culture correspondent for Il Giornale.

In 2000, Secolo appointed its first woman editor-in-chief, Flavia Perina. She introduced reporting and editorials on feminism and ecology, and reached to Islamic citizens of Italy. In 2009, the newspaper campaigned for the investigation into the homicide of a 31-year-old man who died while in police custody, in Rome, after being arrested for possession of drugs, a case that "gripped the country." (Note: In 2019, after nine years and numerous trials, two police officers were found guilty of involuntary manslaughter and sentenced to 12 years imprisonment. See Tondo (2019).) On the controversial issue of immigration, Perina published editorials in support of granting Italian citizenship to non-European Community citizens who've been residing in the country for five years or more.

In January 2011, Secolo's editor-in-chief co-signed, along with women of all ideological persuasions, an open letter that denounced "the repeated, indecent, ostentatious representation of women as a naked object of sexual exchange offered by newspapers, televisions, and advertisements". The same year, she co-authored along with Partito Democratico MP Alessia Mosca the essay "A dialogue on power, rights, family, in the most male-dominated country in Europe" in response to the "Rubygate" scandal.

In 2007, with Silvio Berlusconi having fallen from power, Alleanza Nazionale merged with Forza Italia to create a "centre-right" grouping, "the People of Freedom" (Popolo della Libertà or PdL), which went on to win the 2008 parliamentary election, returning Berlusconi to power. In 2010, disagreements on policy between Fini and Berlusconi caused Fini and most of his supporters to leave PdL. In March 2011, Perina was sacked from the position of Secolo d'Italia editor-in-chief by decision of its board of directors, chaired by Giuseppe Valentino (Note: In 2017, Giuseppe Valentino was elected Alleanza president.) and composed mostly of Alleanza members. She was asked to remain as political commentator but refused. (Note: After her sacking from Secolo, Perina continued reporting and campaigning for women's rights, going as far as denouncing the "paternalism of the Right" on this issue. See here, in Huffington Post (2017).) Luciano Lanna and culture editor Filippo Rossi also left the newspaper with her. Former Secolo editor Enzo Raisi denounced Perina's sacking, stating that it's "a shame for the freedom of the press." She was replaced by Alleanza member and parliamentarian Marcello De Angelis.

== Online years ==
In December 2011, the newly sworn-in government of Mario Monti announced significant cutbacks to the subsidies historically dispensed to the newspaper industry, a move that hit especially hard titles with small circulations. In May 2012, the government announced tax credits and other supportive measures for online newspapers and magazines. In November 2012, a four-month freeze on salary payments in Secolo d'Italia was lifted after the liquidity problems were resolved. The financial plan included passing the newspaper's ownership from the bankrupt A.N. Association to a new company, the A.N. Foundation, and it was formulated by president Franco Mugnai, general secretary Antonio Giordano, board chairman Tommaso Foti, and managing director Alberto Dello Strologo, with the consent of the members appointed by the court during the bankruptsy-protection process.

On 21 December 2012, Secolo d'Italia ceased its print edition and became an online-only publication.

Italo Bocchino took over as editor-in-chief on 14 June 2014. In 2020, the Federazione Italiana Editori Giornali for online-newspaper publishers elected him as vice president. Οn 23 January 2019, Francesco Storace, former leader of the party La Destra ("The Right"), replaced him. One year later, Storace left to join Il Tempo as assistant editor-in-chief, replaced temporarily by Girolamo Fragalà. Italo Bocchino returned in 2020 and went on to become the Secolo d'Italia editor-in-chief with the most years in that position.

== See also ==
- Il Popolo d'Italia
