= Pasquale Viespoli =

Italian politician

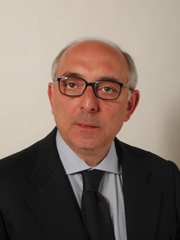

Personal details
- Born: Pasquale Viespoli; 19 January 1955 (age 71) Benevento (Italy)
- Height: 1.73 m (5 ft 8 in)
- Spouse: Simonetta Rivellini
- Occupation: politician

Pasquale Viespoli (born 19 January 1955) is an Italian politician who served as Mayor of Benevento (1993–2001), Deputy (2001–2006), Undersecretary of State (2001–2006, 2008–2010) and Senator (2006–2013).
