= Giuseppe Tatarella =

Italian politician (1935–1999)

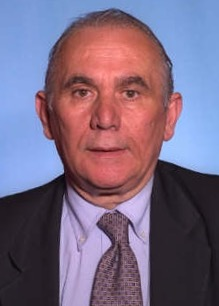

Deputy Prime Minister of Italy
- In office 10 May 1994 – 17 January 1995 Serving with Roberto Maroni
- Prime Minister: Silvio Berlusconi
- Preceded by: Claudio Martelli
- Succeeded by: Walter Veltroni

Minister of Communications
- In office 10 May 1994 – 17 January 1995
- Prime Minister: Silvio Berlusconi
- Preceded by: Maurizio Pagani
- Succeeded by: Agostino Gambino

Member of the Chamber of Deputies
- In office 20 June 1979 – 8 February 1999
- Constituency: Apulia

Personal details
- Born: 17 September 1935 Cerignola, Kingdom of Italy
- Died: 8 February 1999 (aged 63) Turin, Italy
- Party: MSI (until 1995); AN (1995–1999)

Giuseppe Tatarella (17 September 1935 – 8 February 1999), also known as Pinuccio Tatarella, was an Italian politician who served as deputy prime minister in the first cabinet of Silvio Berlusconi from 1994 to 1995.

== Early life and education ==
Tatarella was born in Cerignola, Apulia, in 1935. He held a law degree.

== Career ==
Tatarella was a lawyer and journalist. He worked for the local branches of the Italian Social Movement (MSI), a neo-fascist party that was launched by Benito Mussolini's followers in 1946 based on his strong nationalistic ideals. In the 1960s, he launched the weekly Puglia d'Oggi (Puglia Today). In 1970, he became a member of the Puglia regional council. In 1979, he was first elected to the Italian Parliament and retained his seat until 1999. Tatarella was among the co-founders of National Alliance (AN) in January 1994. He became one of its senior member. The party was the continuation of the MSI. He served as floor leader of the AN at the parliament for a long time. In 1996, he took over the Il Roma, a Naples-based daily, and served as its editor until 1999.

Tatarella was appointed deputy prime minister to the first Berlusconi government, which was the first right-wing cabinet of Italy after World War II, on 10 May 1994. He also served as Minister of Post and Telecommunications. Although he was one of four AN members in the same cabinet, only Tatarella's appointment was regarded as significant, and he was surnamed the minister of harmony. Tatarella was in office until 1995. He also won his seat from Bari in the 1996 Italian general election. In January 1997, he was named as the head of a parliamentary subcommittee. It was one of four subcommittees that constituted a bicameral committee of Parliament set up to discuss the institutional reorganization of Italy.

During his political career, Tatarella was often described and viewed as a fascist, which he denied. Tatarella said that he had joined the MSI not because he was nostalgic of Italian fascism but because it was the strongest anti-communist party. He defined himself thusly: "I am a nationalist, a Catholic and a democrat." Belgian minister Elio Di Rupo refused to shake Tatarella's hand during a meeting in Brussels when Tatarella was serving as deputy prime minister and minister of posts and telecommunications. It was due to the negative image of AN.

== Death ==
Tatarella died of a heart attack at a hospital in Turin at age 63 on 8 February 1999. A funeral service was performed for him in Bari.
