= Gianfranco Fini =

Italian politician (born 1952)

Gianfranco Fini GCMG
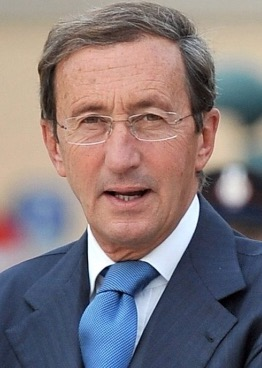

President of the Chamber of Deputies
- In office 30 April 2008 – 14 March 2013
- Preceded by: Fausto Bertinotti
- Succeeded by: Laura Boldrini

Deputy Prime Minister of Italy
- In office 11 June 2001 – 17 May 2006
- Prime Minister: Silvio Berlusconi
- Preceded by: Sergio Mattarella
- Succeeded by: Massimo D'Alema; Francesco Rutelli

Minister of Foreign Affairs
- In office 18 November 2004 – 17 May 2006
- Prime Minister: Silvio Berlusconi
- Preceded by: Franco Frattini
- Succeeded by: Massimo D'Alema

Secretary of the Italian Social Movement
- In office 7 July 1991 – 27 January 1995
- Preceded by: Pino Rauti
- Succeeded by: position abolished
- In office 13 December 1987 – 14 January 1990
- Preceded by: Giorgio Almirante
- Succeeded by: Pino Rauti

Member of the Chamber of Deputies
- In office 12 July 1983 – 14 March 2013
- Constituency: Rome

Personal details
- Born: 3 January 1952 (age 74) Bologna, Italy
- Party: MSI (1968–1995); AN (1995–2009); PdL (2009–2010); FLI (2010–2013)
- Spouse: Daniela Di Sotto (m. 1988; div. 2007)
- Domestic partner(s): Elisabetta Tulliani (since 2007)
- Children: 3
- Education: Sapienza University of Rome
- Profession: Journalist; Politician

Gianfranco Fini (born 3 January 1952) is a retired Italian politician who served as the president of the Italian Chamber of Deputies from 2008 to 2013 and Deputy Prime Minister from 2001 to 2006. He is the former leader of the far-right Italian Social Movement, the conservative National Alliance, and the center-right Future and Freedom party. He was Deputy Prime Minister and Minister of Foreign Affairs in Silvio Berlusconi's government from 2001 to 2006.

== Biography ==
=== Family origins ===
Fini was born on 3 January 1952 in Bologna. His grandfather, a communist activist, died in 1970. His father, Argenio "Sergio" Fini (Bologna, 1923 – Rome, 1998), was a volunteer with the Italian Social Republic, a fascist state in Northern Italy allied with Germany during 1943–45; he later declared feeling close to the centre-left Italian Democratic Socialist Party (PDSI), but withdrew from political activity after his son became involved in the Italian Social Movement (MSI).

His mother Erminia Marani (Ferrara, 1926 – Rome, 2008) was the daughter of Antonio Marani, who took part along with Italo Balbo in the march on Rome, which signalled the beginning of Italian fascism in 1922. The name Gianfranco was chosen in remembrance of a cousin, who was killed when he was 20 years old by partisans soon after the liberation of Northern Italy on 25 April 1945.

=== Personal events ===
In the 1980s, he met Daniela Di Sotto, at that time married to Sergio Mariani, a friend and party officer. Di Sotto ended her marriage to stay with Fini. Mariani would try to kill himself soon after. In 1985 they had their only daughter, Giuliana. Fini and Di Sotto married in a civil ceremony in Marino in 1988. They separated in 2007.

Five months after his separation, his relationship with Elisabetta Tulliani, a lawyer, was revealed. In December 2007, they had a daughter, Carolina. Their second daughter is called Martina.

== Political career ==
=== From the beginning to the role of Deputy of Giorgio Almirante ===
Fini attended "Laura Bassi" high school in Bologna. His first known involvement with politics occurred in 1968, when the 16-year-old Fini was involved in clashes with communist activists, among them a protest in front of a cinema against the screening of the John Wayne movie The Green Berets. At this time, he became involved with the Italian Social Movement.

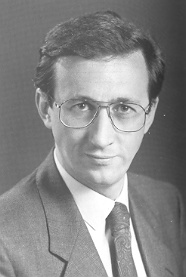
Gianfranco Fini in 1992.

He then began his political career in the Youth Front, the MSI youth organization. Three years later, he moved with his family to Rome. In August 1976 he served his military service in Savona, then in Rome at the Ministry of Defence. In 1977 he became national secretary of the Youth Front, chosen by Giorgio Almirante, secretary of the party that now called itself "MSI - Destra Nazionale". Fini had placed fifth among seven candidates elected in the national secretariat of the youth.

In the meantime, Fini had also graduated with a degree in pedagogy from La Sapienza University in Rome. He also collaborated with the party's newspaper, Il Secolo d'Italia, along with the youth movement magazine Dissenso.

Fini was first elected to the Chamber of Deputies on 26 June 1983 as a member of the MSI. Re-elected in 1987, in September he was nominated by Almirante to be his successor as the party's secretary.

In 2009 it emerged that as early as 1980 Almirante had identified Fini as one among a group of young Italians who were "young, non-fascist, non-nostalgic, who believe, as I do by now, in these institutions, in this Constitution. Because only in this way the MSI can have a future."

=== From the Italian Social Movement to National Alliance ===
Giorgio Almirante died in May 1988, and at the party's congress in Sorrento that year, Fini defeated the right wing of the party, headed by Pino Rauti, and was elected party secretary. He remained in the national secretariat of the MSI until January 1990, when at the next party congress in Rimini, Pino Rauti was elected secretary. But in July 1991, after a tough electoral defeat in administrative and regional elections in Sicily, Fini returned to his role as party secretary. He held this post until the dissolution of party in 1995.

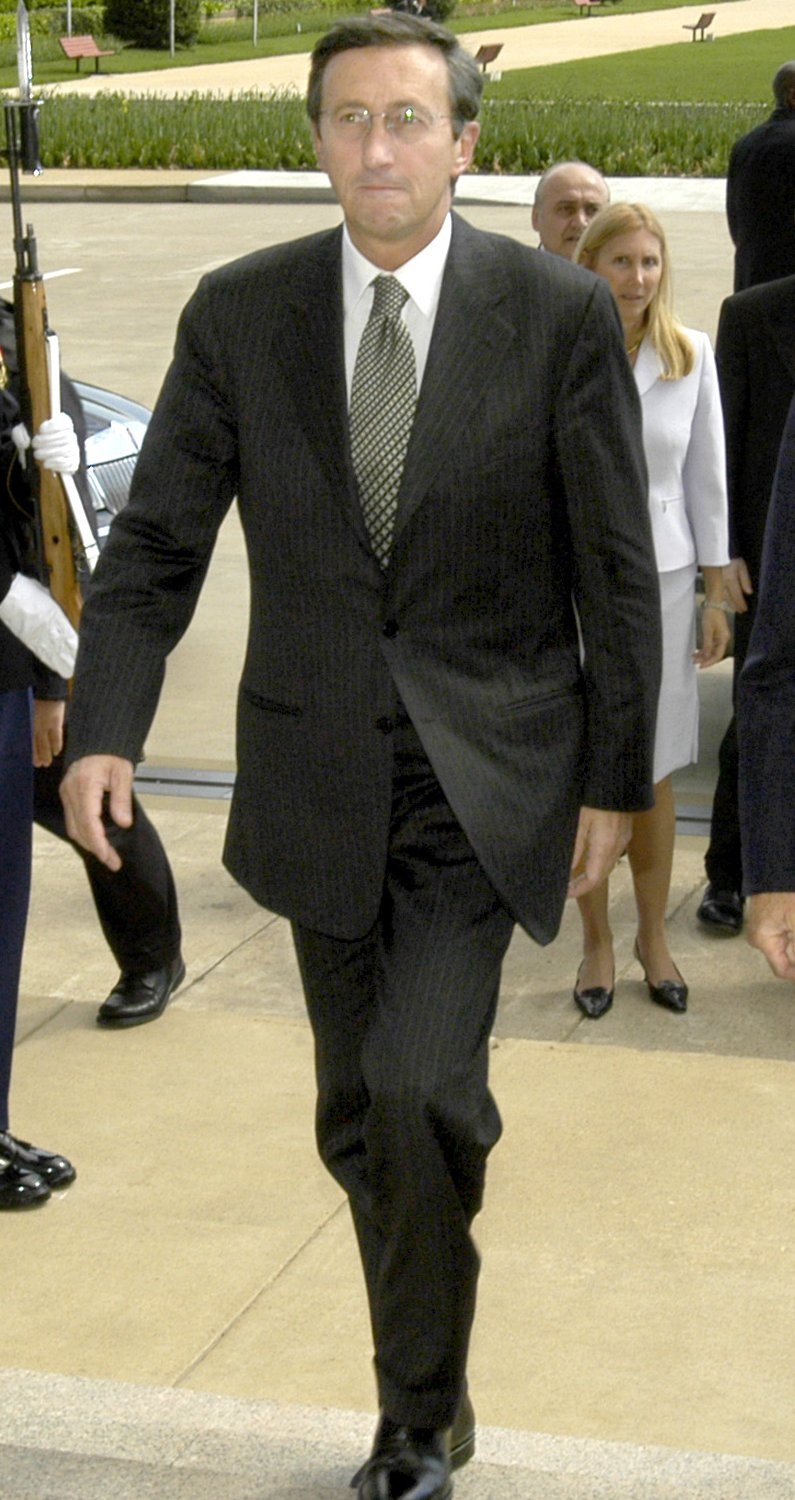
Gianfranco Fini in 2004.

During his time as national secretary, he confirmed the MSI's role as the inheritors of Benito Mussolini's Fascist legacy with a number of famous polemical statements, including: "Dear comrades, MSI claims its right to refer to fascism" (1988), "We are fascists, the heirs of fascism, the fascism of the year 2000" (1991), "After almost half a century, the idea of fascism is alive" (1992), "There are phases where freedom is not among the key values" (1994), "Mussolini was the greatest Italian statesman of the twentieth century", "Fascism has a tradition of honesty, correctness and good government" (1994).

In the autumn of 1993, Fini ran for mayor of Rome, garnering enough votes to participate in a runoff election that resulted in the victory of Francesco Rutelli. Nevertheless, for the first time an MSI candidate received significant support in a major election. Silvio Berlusconi, then an entrepreneur but not involved in politics, affirmed on that occasion his preference for Fini: "If I had to vote in Rome, my preference would go to Fini.

After Berlusconi's election in 1994, for the first time in Italy's political history, an Italian government included four ministers from the MSI party, including the Deputy Prime Minister Giuseppe Tatarella, although Fini did not directly take part as a minister. (Fini was not a minister at that time.)

During the 1990s Fini gradually began to move the MSI away from its neo-fascist ideology to a more traditionally conservative political agenda. In January 1995, the Party's congress in Fiuggi marked a radical change, afterwards referred to as la svolta di Fiuggi (the turning point at Fiuggi) and merged the MSI with conservative elements of the disbanded Christian Democrats to form the National Alliance (AN), of which Fini assumed the presidency.

The new party took a decisive stance distancing itself from fascism. After the House of Freedoms' 1994 victory, Fini said there would not and could not be any return to fascism and frequently disavowed AN supporters who used the fascist salute. Some MSI members (Pino Rauti, Erra, Staiti) dissented and seceded to form the new Tricolor Flame party.

=== Government experiences ===
Fini and his party have been part of Berlusconi's right-wing House of Freedoms coalition which won the 1994 and 2001 parliamentary election. Fini became deputy prime minister in 2001 and foreign minister in November 2004.

From February 2002 to 2006, he represented the Italian Government at the European Convention. Following the April 2008 general election, Fini was elected President of the Chamber of Deputies on 30 April 2008 on the fourth ballot, receiving 355 votes.

His most widely known legislative acts have been:

- The Bossi-Fini Act, a restrictive law on immigration;
- The Fini-Giovanardi Act (2006), a restrictive law on drugs. The act abolishes any distinction between soft drugs (cannabis) and hard drugs (heroin, cocaine), punishing the user on the base of the quantity of active ingredient in the dose. As administrative sanctions, personal use of drugs is punished with a fine and the suspension of passport, driving license and/or weapon carrying permit. The cultivation of a single plant is punished with 1 up to 6 years of imprisonment.

=== From National Alliance to the People of Freedom ===
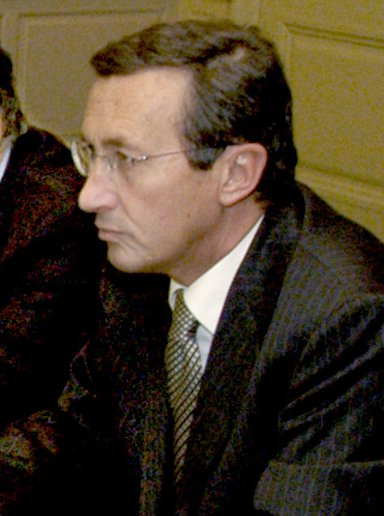
Gianfranco Fini in 2004.

After some discord between the party's factions in 2005, a congress dismantled the factions and confirmed Fini as president of the party.

In 2006, Fini announced the removal of the symbol of the flame and of the "M.S.I." writing from AN symbol. The move, after facing opposition from party members such as Maurizio Gasparri was finally denied.

Fini began a personal evolution towards more socially liberal positions in the 2000s, notwithstanding the opposition of the rest of his party. In particular:

- in 2005 he announced a positive vote (three yes, one no) on a referendum on artificial insemination aimed at removing some limits introduced by the Act n.40/2004 of the same Berlusconi II Cabinet.
- in December 2006 he declared he would be in favour of public acknowledgement of civil unions, including homosexual ones, although nonetheless in opposition to the centre-left government proposed bill on the theme.

At the end of January 2007, Berlusconi declared that Fini would be his only successor in case of unification of centre-right parties, provoking dissent from the Northern League and the Union of Christian and Centre Democrats (UDC).

In 2007 Berlusconi proclaimed the dissolution of his Forza Italia party and the birth of a new unitary party of the centre-right, the People of Freedom. At first, Fini reacted coldly, affirming that AN would not participate, judging the way the new party was born confused and superficial, and expressing open dissent against his ally of the "former coalition".

However, two months later, he moved closer to Berlusconi again, soon after the fall of the Prodi II Cabinet. They agreed to present the two parties under the same symbol of the People of Freedom in the April 2008 parliamentary election, and then to proceed towards a unitary centre-right party.

=== President of the Chamber of Deputies ===
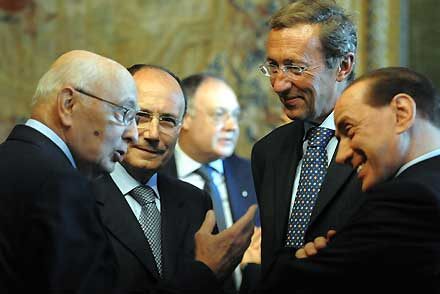
Fini with Giorgio Napolitano, Silvio Berlusconi and Renato Schifani.

After the electoral victory, on 30 April 2008 after four rounds of voting, Fini was elected President of the Chamber of Deputies, with 335 votes from a total of 611. He then resigned the presidency of AN in anticipation of unification with the new People of Freedom party. Within this new party, Fini became seen as Berlusconi's "heir apparent".

Commenting on the homage to every victim of terrorism made by the President of the Republic, the former member of the Italian Communist Party (PCI) Giorgio Napolitano, he announced "the end of the post-war period", of "the cleavage between the right and society", and of "overcoming minority status".

Pursuing his path of revision of the values of the Italian right, at the 2008 youth fest Atreju 2008 he asserted that the Right has to acknowledge those rights "present in the Constitution: freedom, equality and social justice. Values that determined and still determine the path of the Right, that are values of any democracy and that are fully anti-fascist".

In his role of Speaker of the Chamber, he more than once rebuked the government, criticising their extensive use of the confidence votes. He was considered a moderating force between Berlusconi's government and the President of the Republic, eventually suggesting that Berlusconi should step down.

He fought against the bad practices of absenteeism and double-voting by MPs in the Italian Parliament, promoting a digital voting system (to be implemented from March 2009) to prevent other MPs from voting on behalf of absent members, judging it "immoral" 19 MPs out of a total of 630 refused, however, to allow their fingerprints to be recorded, and the system was implemented on a voluntary basis.

He also negatively judged the desire of the Berlusconi government to intervene with a decree in the case of Eluana Englaro and supported the need to defend the secularism of the State, being then criticized by members of UDC and of his own party. In recent times he has become more and more vocally critical of the government platform, which he considers too biased towards the far-right federalist coalition party Lega Nord. This has brought him into conflict with Berlusconi himself.

He founded the parliamentarian group "Futuro e libertà per l'Italia" (Future and Freedom for Italy) in hopes of establishing a centrist "third pole", similar to what Pier Ferdinando Casini had done with the Union of the Centre. In the 2013 Italian general election, the FLI (Future and Freedom for Italy) received only 0.5% of the vote and thus was awarded no seats in the Chamber of Deputies, ending Fini's 30 year parliamentary career. After the electoral defeat, Fini retired from politics.

== Controversies ==
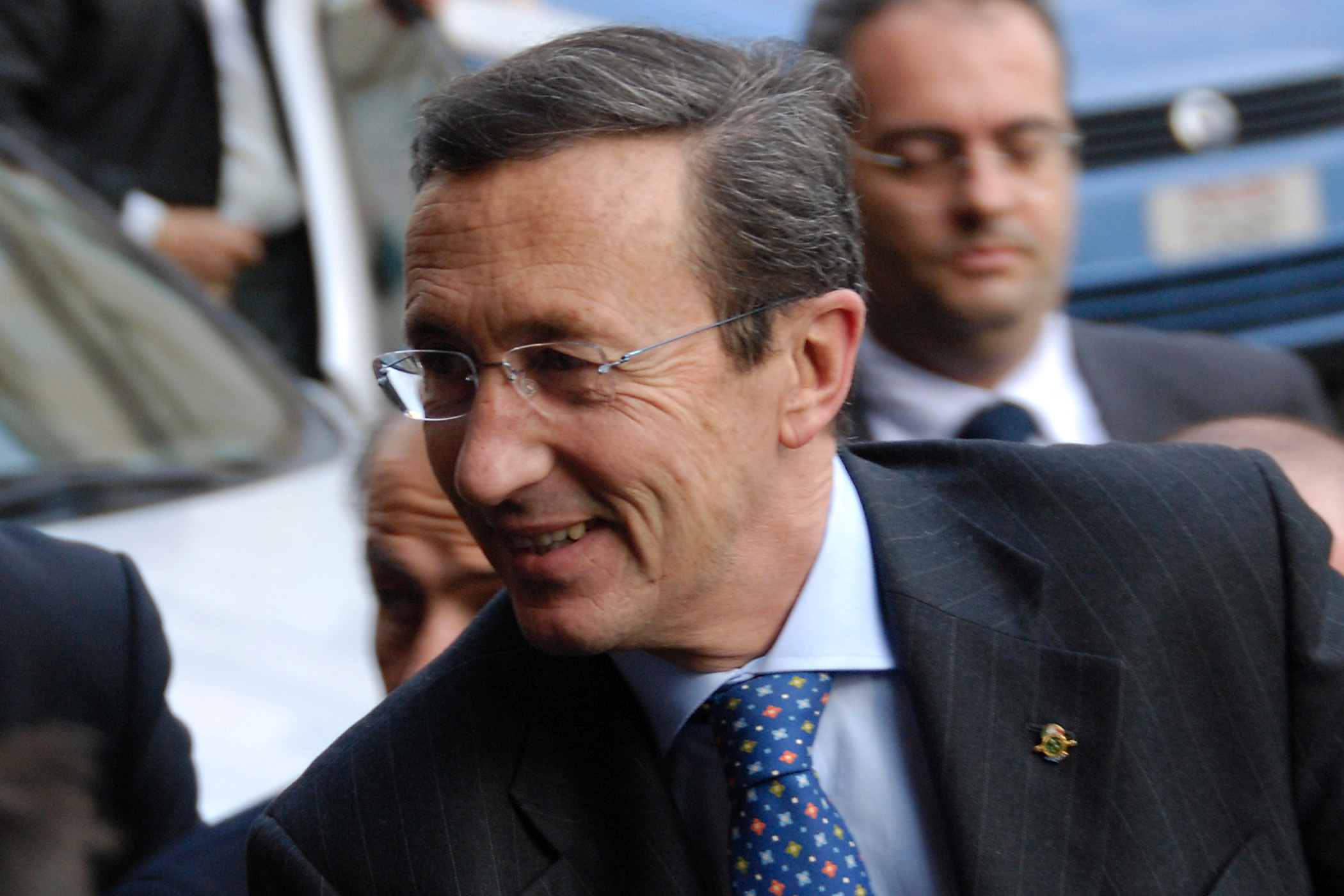
Gianfranco Fini in 2008.

The strongest criticisms of Fini from the right are related to moves away from the traditional policies of the party. Apart from the Social Right area of his traditional rival Pino Rauti, the right-wing intellectual Marcello Veneziani accused Fini of having lost any connection to right-wing thought (whether traditional, nostalgic, modern, or conservative) and of representing an astral right, with no similarity to any other European right-wing group.

Further criticism of Fini came from Lega Nord with respect to some aspects of federalism and immigration, and from Forza Italia regarding justice.

Fini has lately been accused of being incoherent by some theo-con members for holding socially conservative political positions while at the same time being separated and never married in Church.

- In 1999, Fini asked for forced hospitalization of drug users, without distinction between different illegal drugs.
- On 13 October 2004, he said that "Istria, Fiume (Rijeka) and Dalmatia are Italian land" and that Croatia is against national minorities.
- On 29 January 2006, after Senate approval of the Fini-sponsored drug bill which strengthened the law against marijuana and promoted it to a class 1 drug, putting it in the same category as heroin and cocaine, giving dealers the same penalty as dealers in hard drugs and users the same fines for consumption, Fini, as a guest on the popular TV-Show Che tempo che fa, hosted by Fabio Fazio, admitted to having smoked marijuana while on vacation in Jamaica.
- In May 2008, he sparked outrage when he said that the burning of an Israeli flag was much worse than the murder of a 29-year-old man in Verona, savagely beaten to death by a local group of skinheads.
- He ignited controversy when he stated that the racial laws were not the sole responsibility of the Fascist regime, but also that Italian civil society and the Roman Catholic Church had to have their share of the blame as well.
- At a press conference to the Foreign Press Association, he was asked for his thoughts on Benito Mussolini. A journalist reminded him that 15 years earlier he had called the dictator the greatest statesman of the century. Fini replied: "I'm fascinated by your question. ... clearly the answer is in what I've done in the past 15 years. Today my answer is no, I have changed my mind, otherwise I would be schizophrenic."
- In August 2010, after becoming a leading critic of Berlusconi and threatening Berlusconi's majority in parliament, a newspaper owned by the Berlusconi family implicated Fini with a condominium in Monte Carlo. The condo was previously owned by the National Alliance political party. The party sold the condo in 2008 to an offshore company and it was leased back to the younger brother of Fini's girlfriend. Elisabetta Tulliani, the partner of Fini, is now under investigation by magistrates in Rome for money laundering because of a bank transfer of 739.000 euros related to the sale of the Montecarlo condo. The magistrates found documentary evidence that Elisabetta and her brother Giancarlo were the real owners of the offshore companies that leased the condo, and afterwards sold it. Fini said he was "a dork (coglione) but never a corrupt man", because he did not notice that the condo was owned and sold by his girlfriend. In April 2024, Fini was convicted and sentenced to two years and eight months imprisonment for his role in the sale.

== Electoral history ==
Election	House	Constituency	Party	Votes	Result
1983	Chamber of Deputies	Rome–Viterbo–Latina–Frosinone	MSI	16,223	Elected
1987	Chamber of Deputies	Rome–Viterbo–Latina–Frosinone	MSI	38,893	Elected
1989	European Parliament	North-West Italy	MSI	117,978	Elected
1992	Chamber of Deputies	Rome–Viterbo–Latina–Frosinone	MSI	113,650	Elected
1994	Chamber of Deputies	Rome – Della Vittoria	AN	49,446	Elected
1994	European Parliament	Central Italy	AN	658,771	Elected
1996	Chamber of Deputies	Rome – Della Vittoria	AN	48,587	Elected
1999	European Parliament	Central Italy	AN	451,619	Elected
2001	Chamber of Deputies	Rome – Della Vittoria	AN	43,213	Elected
2006	Chamber of Deputies	Lazio 1	AN	– (Note: Elected in a closed list proportional representation system.)	Elected
2008	Chamber of Deputies	Lazio 1	PdL	–	Elected
2013	Chamber of Deputies	Lazio 1	FLI	–	Not elected

=== First-past-the-post elections ===
1994 general election (C): Rome — Della Vittoria
Candidate	Coalition	Votes	%
Gianfranco Fini	Pole of Good Government	49,446	51.8
Eduardo Missoni	Alliance of Progressives	29,171	30.5
Costanza Pera	Pact for Italy	10,179	11.4
Others		6,578	6.9
Total		95,524	100.0

1996 general election (C): Rome — Della Vittoria
Candidate	Coalition	Votes	%
Gianfranco Fini	Pole for Freedoms	48,587	53.5
Giovanni Battista Bachelet	The Olive Tree	40,571	44.7
Others		1,616	1.8
Total		90,774	100.0

2001 general election (C): Rome — Della Vittoria
Candidate	Coalition	Votes	%
Gianfranco Fini	House of Freedoms	43,213	52.6
Augusto Fantozzi	The Olive Tree	35,947	43.8
Others		2,985	3.6
Total		82,145	100.0

Political offices
Preceded by Sergio Mattarella	Deputy Prime Minister of Italy; 2001–2006; With: Marco Follini (2004–2005); Giulio Tremonti (2005–2006)	Succeeded by Massimo D'Alema
Preceded by Sergio Mattarella	Deputy Prime Minister of Italy; 2001–2006; With: Marco Follini (2004–2005); Giulio Tremonti (2005–2006)	Succeeded by Francesco Rutelli
Preceded by Franco Frattini	Minister of Foreign Affairs; 2004–2006	Succeeded by Massimo D'Alema
Preceded by Fausto Bertinotti	President of the Chamber of Deputies; 2008–2013	Succeeded by Laura Boldrini
Party political offices
Preceded by Giorgio Almirante	Secretary of the Italian Social Movement; 1987–1990	Succeeded by Pino Rauti
Preceded by Pino Rauti	Secretary of the Italian Social Movement; 1991–1995	Party dissolved
New political party	President of National Alliance; 1995–2008	Succeeded by Ignazio La Russa as Acting President
New political party	President of Future and Freedom; 2011–2013	Vacant
