= 2020 Italian by-elections =

Special elections in Italy to fill vacancies

The 2020 Italian by-elections were called to fill seats in the Parliament that became vacant after the 2018 general elections. In 2020, by-elections were held for the Chamber of Deputies the Senate of the Republic.

== Overview ==
The new Italian electoral law approved in 2017 and nicknamed Rosatellum, provides the election of members of Parliament in 232 single-member districts for the Chamber of Deputies and in 116 for the Senate of the Republic. Whenever a seat of this kind becomes vacant, a by-election is called, and a new representative is elected.

== Chamber of Deputies ==
=== Lazio 1: Rome, Trionfale ===
Map of the district.

The by-election in the constituency of Trionfale (Rome) was held on 1 March 2020 to elect a deputy for the seat left vacant by Paolo Gentiloni (PD). He was selected as the new commissioner for Economy in the Von der Leyen Commission, and resigned from the Chamber of Deputies on 2 December 2019.

The centre-left coalition nominated Roberto Gualtieri, former member of the European Parliament for the PD, and economy minister of the Conte II Cabinet. The centre-right nominated Maurizio Leo.

The election had a low turnout of 17.7%, and the elected candidate was Gualtieri, with 62.2% of the votes.

2020 Rome, Trionfale by-election
Party or coalition	Candidate	Votes	%	+/−
Centre-left	Roberto Gualtieri (PD)	20,304	62.24	+15.01
Centre-right	Maurizio Leo (FdI)	8,508	26.08	–4.73
Five Star Movement	Rossella Rendina	1,422	4.36	–12.43
Communist Party	Marco Rizzo	855	2.62	+2.25
Power to the People	Elisabetta Canitano	785	2.41	+0.19
The People of the Family	Mario Adinolfi	432	1.32	+0.75
Volt Italy	Luca Maria Lo Muzio Lezza	316	0.97	—
Total votes		32,622	100.00	—
Turnout		32,880	17.65	—
Centre-left hold				

== Senate of the Republic ==
=== Campania 7: Naples, San Carlo all'Arena ===
Map of the district.

The by-election in the constituency of San Carlo all'Arena (Naples) was held on 23 February to elect a senator for the seat left vacant by Franco Ortolani (M5S), who died on 23 November 2019.

The Five Star Movement, in an internal vote, nominated engineer Luigi Napolitano, former M5S candidate in the 2019 European election. After his nomination, Napolitano was accused by Neapolitan M5S activists of having been nominated for being a close friend of the M5S leader Luigi Di Maio during university.

The centre-right coalition confirmed the candidacy of Salvatore Guangi (FI), Vice President of the City Council of Naples and former centre-right candidate in the same constituency in the 2018 general election.

The centre-left coalition reached an agreement with DemA, the party of Mayor of Naples Luigi De Magistris, by nominating the journalist Sandro Ruotolo, former candidate for Civil Revolution in the 2013 Lazio regional election (running for president) and in the 2013 general election. Ruotolo stated that in case of victory he would seat in the Mixed Group.

The left-wing party Power to the People ran with Professor Giuseppe Aragno, former candidate for the same party in the same constituency in the 2018 general election. Riccardo Guarino, president of the party "Neapolitan Renaissance", announced his intention to run for the election.

The election was characterized by a very low turnout of only 9.52%, and saw the victory of the centre-left candidate Sandro Ruotolo with 48.5% of the votes.

2020 Naples, San Carlo all'Arena by-election
Party or coalition	Candidate	Votes	%	+/−
Centre-left	Sandro Ruotolo (Ind.)	16,243	48.45	+28.16
Centre-right	Salvatore Guangi (FI)	8,066	24.06	+1.45
Five Star Movement	Luigi Napolitano	7,533	22.47	–30.70
Power to the People	Giuseppe Aragno	865	2.58	+0.29
Neapolitan Renaissance	Riccardo Guarino	819	2.44	—
Total votes		33,526	100.00	—
Turnout		34,009	9.52	—
Centre-left gain from Five Star Movement				

=== Umbria 2: Terni ===
Map of the district.

The by-election in the constituency of Terni was held on 8 March to elect a senator for the seat left vacant by Donatella Tesei (Lega). She was elected as the new President of the Region of Umbria after the 2019 regional election, and resigned on 2 December from her Senate seat.

2020 Terni by-election
Party or coalition	Candidate	Votes	%	+/−
Centre-right	Valeria Alessandrini (League)	23,552	53.74	+15.19
Centre-left	Maria Elisabetta Mascio (Ind.)	16,669	38.03	+12.35
Five Star Movement	Roberto Alcidi	3,282	7.49	–20.55
Reconquer Italy	Armida Gargani	325	0.74	—
Total votes		43,828	100.00	—
Turnout		44,580	14.55	—
Centre-right hold				

=== Sardinia 3: Sassari ===
Map of the district.

A by-election in the constituency of Sassari was held on 20–21 September 2020, to elect a senator for the seat left vacant by Vittoria Bogo Deledda (M5S), who died on 17 March 2020. The centre-left coalition and the Five Star Movement reached an agreement with the engineer Lorenzo Corda, while the center-right coalition supported the regional councillor Antonello Peru. Italia Viva, Italia in Comune, More Europe and Italian Liberal Party instead chose to run with their own candidate, the lawyer Agostinangelo Marras.

2020 Sassari by-election
Party or coalition	Candidate	Votes	%	+/−
Centre-right	Carlo Doria (PSd'Az)	49,725	40.25	+8.41
Centre-left	Lorenzo Corda (Ind.)	35,718	28.91	–31.36
Italia Viva (Note: Including also IiC, +E and PLI.)	Agostinangelo Marras (Ind.)	30,671	24.83	—
Italian Socialist Party	Gian Mario Salis	7,434	6.02	—
Total votes		145,262	100.00	—
Turnout		427,824	33.95	—
Centre-right gain from Five Star Movement				

=== Veneto 9: Villafranca di Verona ===
Map of the district.

A by-election in the constituency of Villafranca di Verona was held in 20–21 September 2020, to elect a senator for the seat left vacant by Stefano Bertacco (FdI), who died on 14 June.

2020 Villafranca di Verona by-election
Party or coalition	Candidate	Votes	%	+/−
Centre-right	Luca De Carlo (FdI)	132,907	71.87	+17.83
Centre-left	Matteo Melotti (PD)	35,059	18.96	+3.68
Five Star Movement	Emanuele Sterzi	16,967	9.17	–14.69
Total votes		201,984	100.00	—
Turnout		326,475	61.87	—
Centre-right hold				
