= Nicola Zamboni =

Italian sculptor (1943–2023)

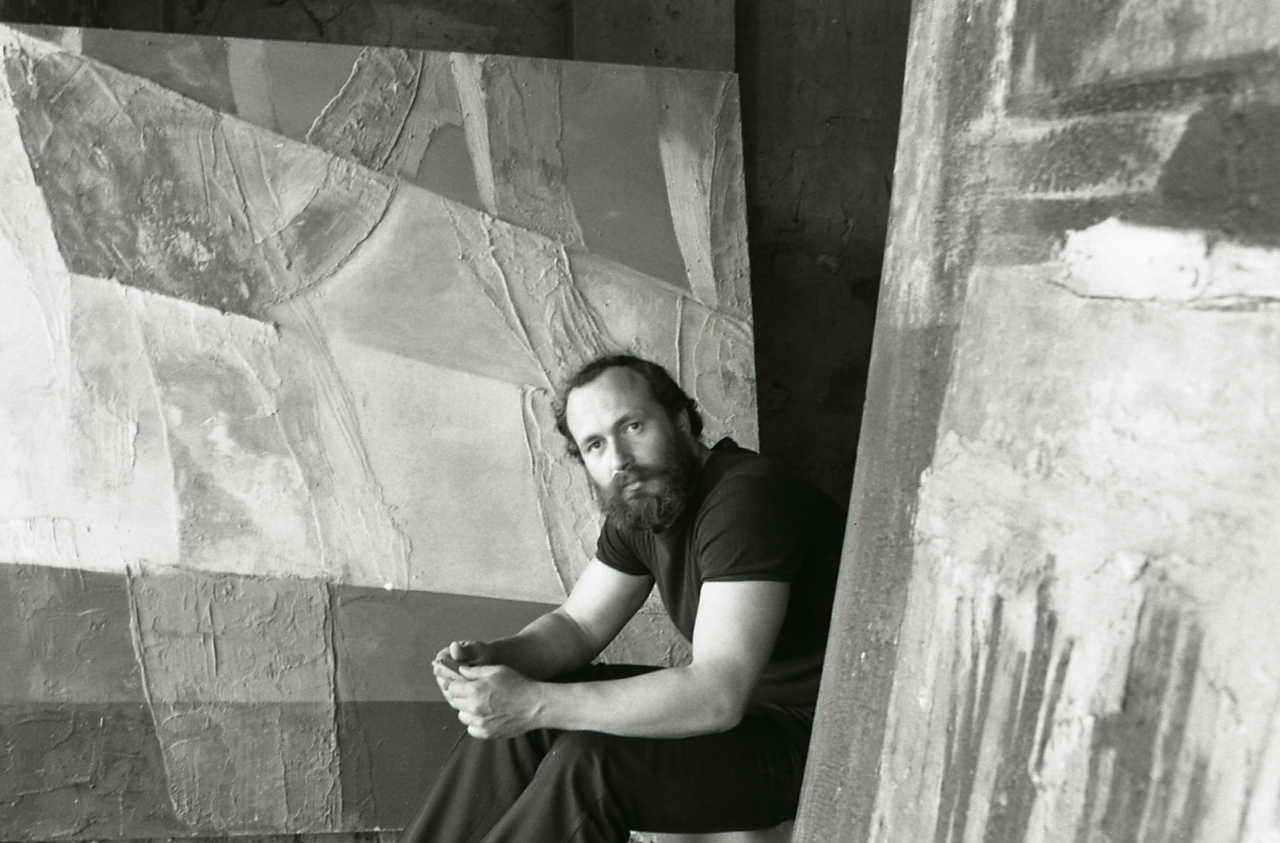
- Zamboni portrayed by Paolo Monti, Bologna, 1974
- Born: May 10, 1943; Bologna, Kingdom of Italy
- Died: January 17, 2023 (aged 79)

Nicola Zamboni' (10 May 1943 – 17 January 2023) was an Italian sculptor from Bologna, known for large-scale figurative works in materials such as ceramics, cement, stone, wood, and copper. A student of Quinto Ghermandi and a guest of Henry Moore, he taught sculpture at the Accademia di Belle Arti di Bologna and later at the Brera Academy in Milan, and created several public monuments commemorating the Bologna massacre.

== Life ==
Zamboni was born in Bologna and he was student and assistant of Quinto Ghermandi. After retiring from the Academy of Fine Arts in Bologna in his third year, he went to England in 1968 as a guest of Henry Moore. In 1975 he began teaching at the Academy in Bologna, and from 1997 to 2004 he taught sculpture at the Brera Academy of Arts in Milan, where he met Sara Bolzani who became his student and partner.

Zamboni lived in Sala Bolognese in a big farmhouse converted into a studio residence, under the banks of the Samoggia river.

The sculptor portrayed the human figure with realistic forms, with a careful search for detail and life-size, in large choral works that require the use of various modelling techniques; these sculptures are made of various materials including ceramics, cement, stone, wood, copper.

He created the large monument in Marzabotto in 1975 in front of the town hall, as well as several monuments commemorating the Bologna massacre in various Italian cities. He also created a small garden of medieval inspiration with allegorical statues in one of the courts of the Cavedone PEEP.

Works by Zamboni photographed by Paolo Monti, 1971

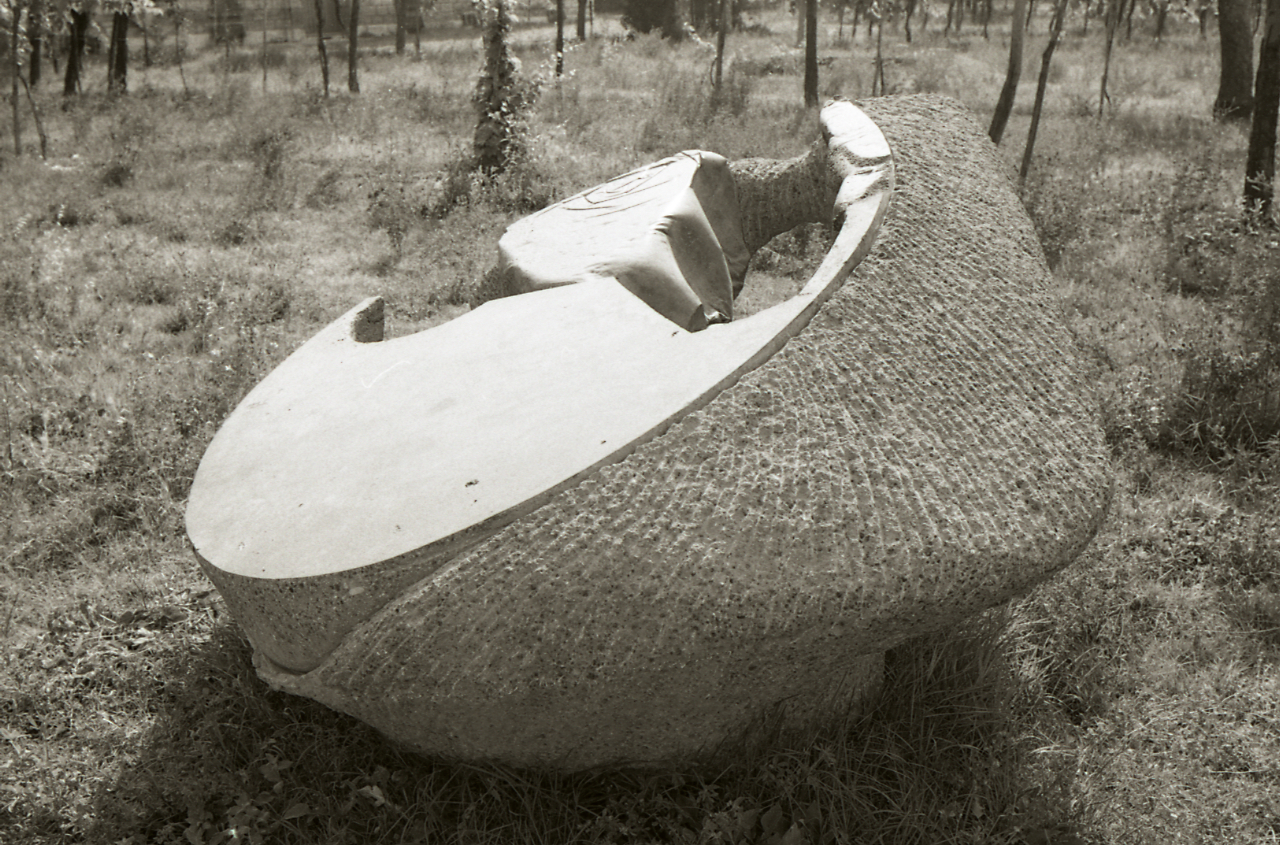
Experiments with cement

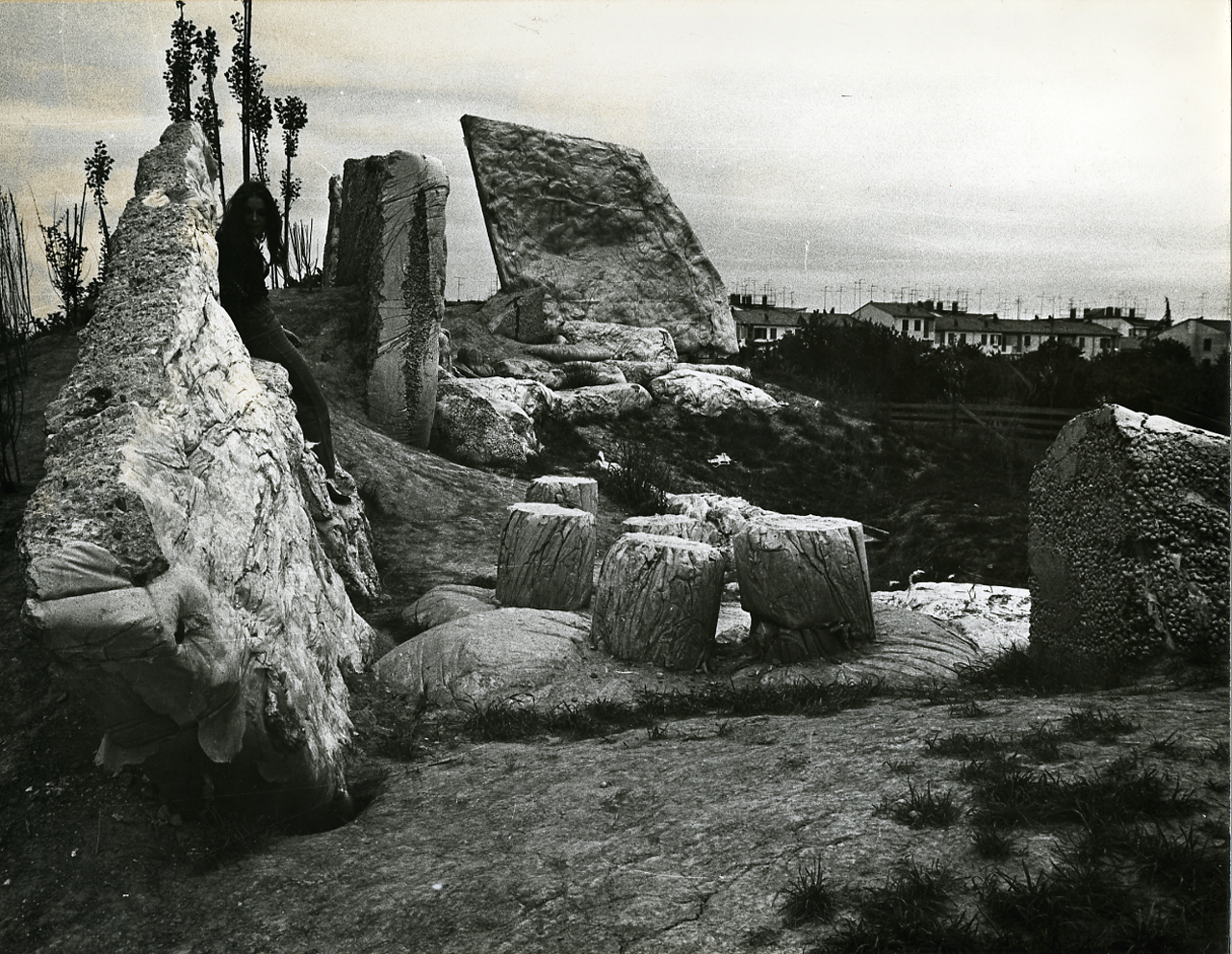
Sculpture theatre

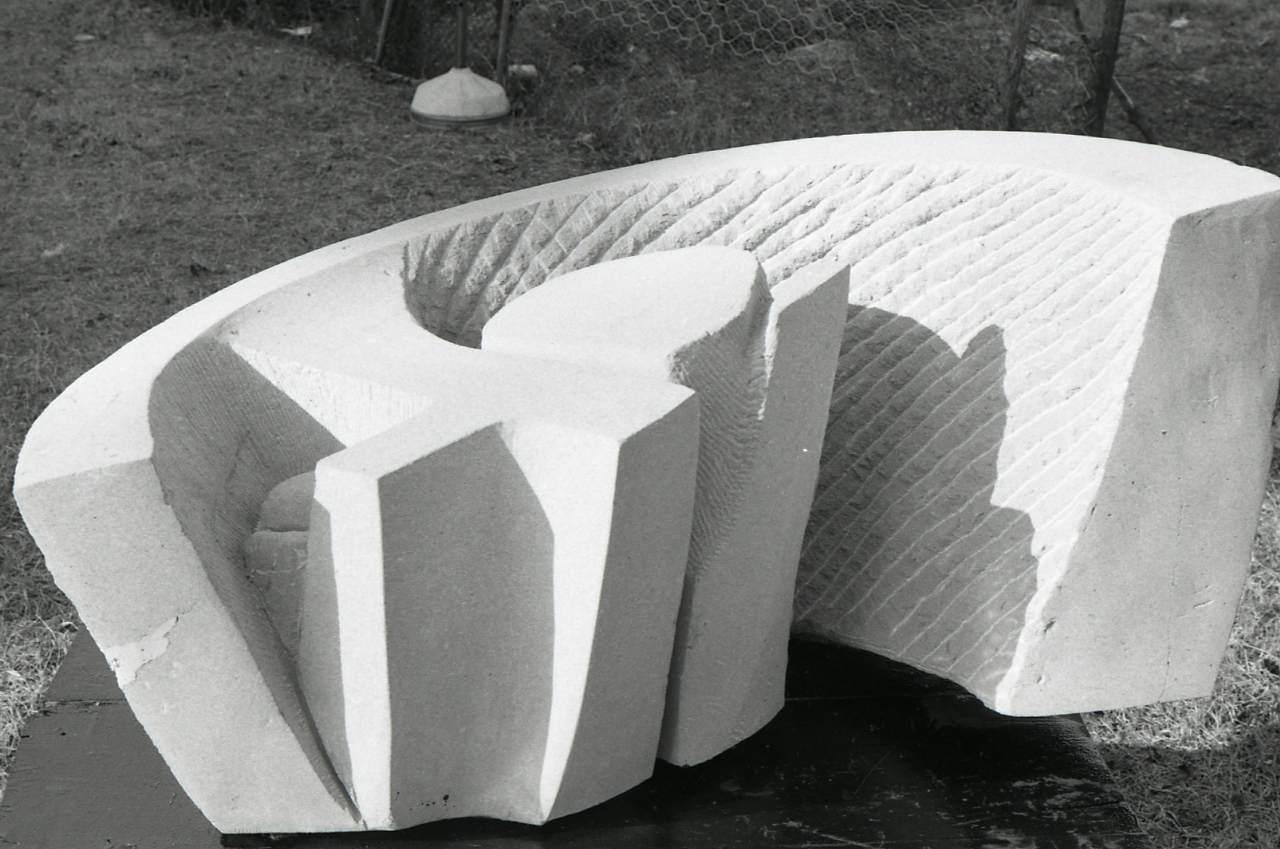
Sculpture, Villa Pepoli Baciocchi, Bologna
