= Sandro Ruotolo =

Italian journalist and politician (born 1955)

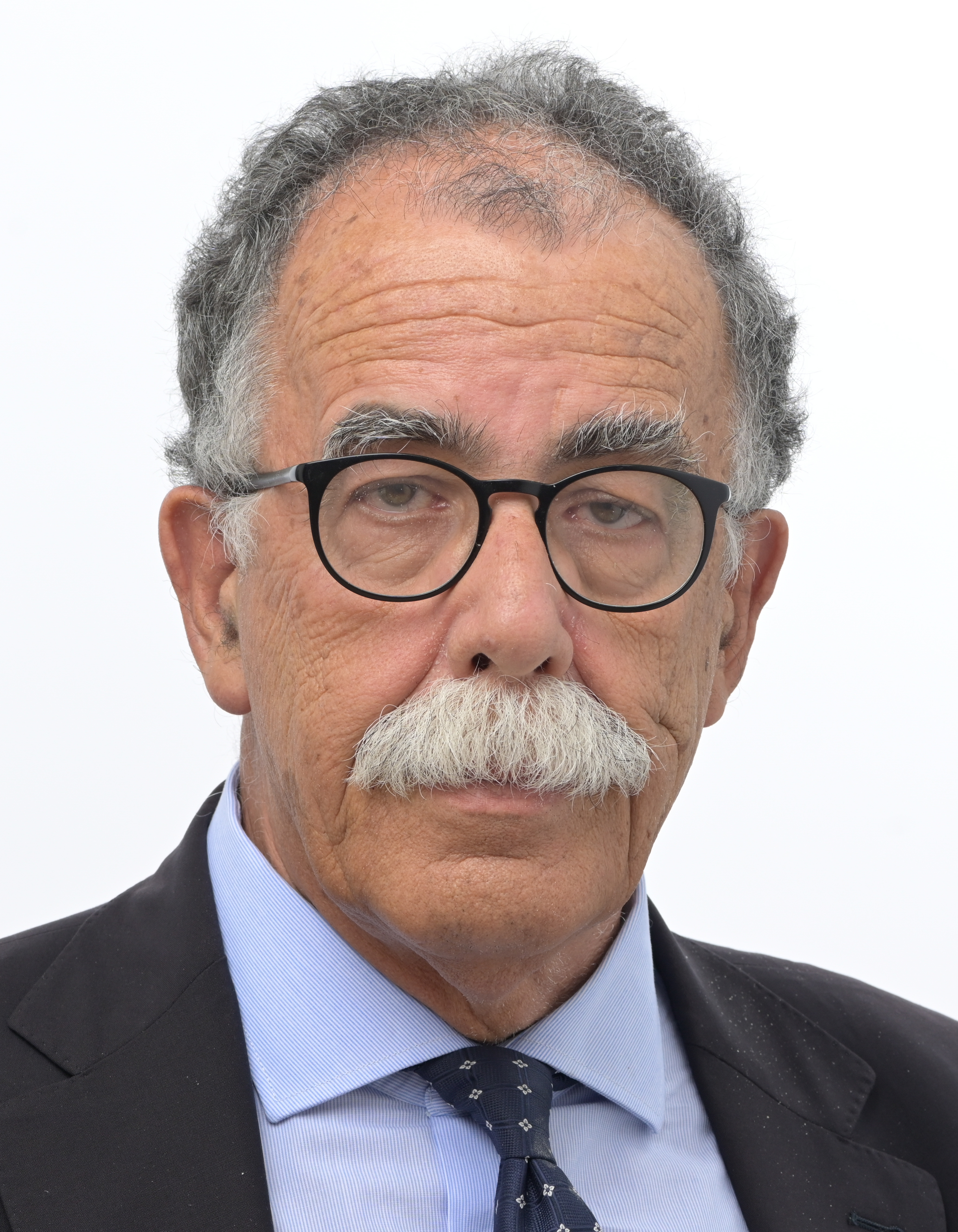

Member of the European Parliament for Southern Italy
- Incumbent
- Assumed office 16 July 2024

Member of the Senate of the Republic
- In office 27 February 2020 – 13 October 2022
- Constituency: Naples–San Carlo all'Arena

Personal details
- Born: Alessandro Ruotolo; 9 July 1955 (age 71) Naples, Italy
- Party: Democratic Party (since 2023)
- Other political affiliations: Centre-left coalition
- Profession: Journalist

Alessandro Ruotolo (born 9 July 1955) is an Italian journalist and politician. He was elected to the Senate of the Republic in a by-election in 2020 as an independent politician of the centre-left coalition.

== Political career ==
In November 2019, Five Star Movement Senator Franco Ortolani died from cancer. A by-election was held in the Naples district in February 2020, in which Ruotolo stood as an independent candidate with support from the centre-left coalition. Ruotolo was elected with 48% of the votes.

Ruotolo has written about the COVID-19 pandemic in Italy.
