= Luca De Carlo =

Italian politician

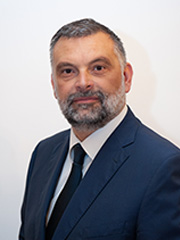

Member of the Senate of the Republic
- Incumbent
- Assumed office 24 September 2020

Member of the Chamber of Deputies
- In office 23 March 2018 – 5 August 2020

Mayor of Calalzo di Cadore
- In office 8 June 2009 – 10 June 2024
- Preceded by: Pier Mario Fop
- Succeeded by: Luca Fanton

Personal details
- Born: 7 August 1972 (age 53) Pieve di Cadore, Veneto, Italy
- Party: Brothers of Italy
- Profession: Entrepreneur

Luca De Carlo (born 7 August 1972) is an Italian politician. He is a member of the Brothers of Italy and the mayor of Calalzo di Cadore from 2009 to 2024.

== Political career ==
In July 2015, he was appointed president of the communal company Servizi Ampezzo (SeAm).

Elected to the Chamber in 2018, he lost the seat in July 2020 after a late recount of the votes.

He was elected to the Italian Senate in a by-election in Villafranca di Verona held in September 2020 to succeed Stefano Bertacco, who died in June. De Carlo is the first parliamentarian in the history of Italy to have been elected to both the Chamber and the Senate during the same legislature.

In November 2022, he was appointed president of Italy's Ninth Commission, which handles industry, commerce, tourism, agriculture and food production.

== Electoral history ==
2020 Villafranca di Verona by-election
Party or coalition	Candidate	Votes	%	+/−
Centre-right	Luca De Carlo (FdI)	132,907	71.87	+17.83
Democratic Party	Matteo Melotti	35,059	18.96	+3.68
Five Star Movement	Emanuele Sterzi	16,967	9.17	–14.69
Total votes		201,984	100.00	—
Turnout		326,475	61.87	—
Centre-right hold				
