= Stefano Bertacco =

Italian politician (1962–2020)

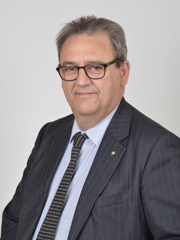

Member of the Senate of the Republic for Villafranca di Verona
- In office 25 September 2014 – 14 June 2020
- Preceded by: constituency created
- Succeeded by: Luca De Carlo
- Constituency: Veneto 09

Personal details
- Born: 29 December 1962 Verona, Veneto, Italy
- Died: 14 June 2020 (aged 57) Verona, Veneto, Italy
- Party: Brothers of Italy (from 2017)
- Other political affiliations: FI (2013-2017); The People of Freedom (2009–2013); National Alliance (1995–2009); Italian Social Movement (until 1995)

Stefano Bertacco (29 December 1962 – 14 June 2020) was an Italian politician who was an Italian Senator from 2014 until his death in 2020.

== Political career ==
Bertacco first became a member of the Italian Senate when Elisabetta Casellati left and Bertacco took her seat in the legislature. Bertacco was re-elected at the 2018 general election in the single-member district of Villafranca di Verona.

Bertacco died on 14 June 2020 after a long illness. A by-election was held to replace Bertacco in September 2020 and was won by Luca De Carlo.
