= List of presidents of the Democratic Party (Italy) =

The president of the Democratic Party is one of the leaders of the Democratic Party, the main centre-left political party in Italy. The current president is Stefano Bonaccini.

== List of presidents ==
N°	Portrait	Name (Born–Died)	Term of office	
1		Romano Prodi (1939– )	14 October 2007	16 April 2008
Vacant			16 April 2008	7 November 2009
2		Rosy Bindi (1951– )	7 November 2009	19 April 2013
Vacant			19 April 2013	15 December 2013
3		Gianni Cuperlo (1961– )	15 December 2013	21 January 2014
Vacant			21 January 2014	14 June 2014
4		Matteo Orfini (1974– )	14 June 2014	17 March 2019
5		Paolo Gentiloni (1954– )	17 March 2019	22 February 2020
6		Valentina Cuppi (1983– )	22 February 2020	12 March 2023
7		Stefano Bonaccini (1967– )	12 March 2023	Incumbent

== List of vice presidents ==
N°	Portrait	Name (Born–Died)	Term of office		President
1		Ivan Scalfarotto (1965– )	7 November 2009	15 December 2013	Bindi
1		Marina Sereni (1960– )	7 November 2009	15 December 2013	Bindi
2		Sandra Zampa (1956– )	15 December 2013	7 May 2017	Cuperlo, Orfini
2		Matteo Ricci (1974– )	15 December 2013	7 May 2017	Cuperlo, Orfini
3		Barbara Pollastrini (1947– )	7 May 2017	17 March 2019	Orfini
3		Domenico De Santis (1982– )	7 May 2017	17 March 2019	Orfini
4		Debora Serracchiani (1970– )	17 March 2019	12 March 2023	Gentiloni, Cuppi
4		Anna Ascani (1987– )	17 March 2019	12 March 2023	Gentiloni, Cuppi
5		Loredana Capone (1964– )	12 March 2023	Incumbent	Bonaccini
5		Chiara Gribaudo (1981– )	12 March 2023	Incumbent	Bonaccini
