= Valentina Cuppi =

Italian politician (born 1983)

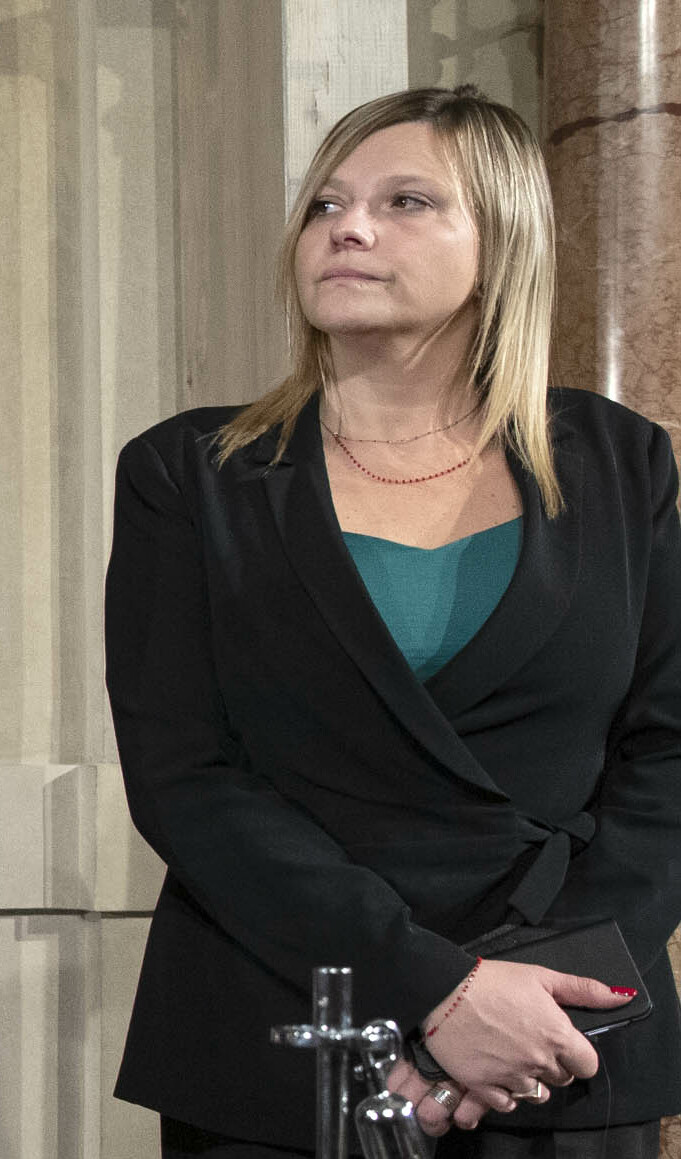

President of the Democratic Party
- In office 22 February 2020 – 12 March 2023
- Vice President: Anna Ascani; Debora Serracchiani
- Preceded by: Paolo Gentiloni
- Succeeded by: Stefano Bonaccini

Mayor of Marzabotto
- Incumbent
- Assumed office 7 June 2019
- Preceded by: Romano Franchi

Personal details
- Born: 19 August 1983 (age 43) Bologna, Italy
- Party: SEL (2010–2016); Independent (2016–2020); PD (since 2020)
- Education: University of Bologna
- Occupation: Teacher, politician

Valentina Cuppi (born 19 August 1983) is an Italian politician. She has been president of the Democratic Party (PD) from February 2020 to March 2023. Since June 2019, she is also serving as mayor of Marzabotto, a town near Bologna.

== Biography ==
Valentina Cuppi was born in Bologna in 1983, and grew up in Marzabotto, a small town in the Bologna province. In 2008, she graduated in Philosophical Sciences at the University of Bologna, where she also got a PhD in Political Science in 2014. Cuppi worked as an educator for many years in Marzabotto, before becoming a history and philosophy teacher in high school.

In 2009 Cuppi was elected to the municipal council of Marzabotto, holding the role of councilor with responsibility for Peace and Marzabotto massacre's Memory. In 2010, she became a member of Left Ecology Freedom (SEL), a democratic socialist party led by Nichi Vendola. As member of SEL, she ran in the 2013 Italian general election for the Chamber of Deputies, but she was not elected. From 2014 to 2019, she held the position of deputy Mayor of Marzabotto and councilor for culture and tourism in the second municipal government of Romano Franchi. In the 2019 local election, Cuppi was elected Mayor of Marzabotto with 70.93% of the votes.

During the 2019 PD leadership election, Cuppi joined the committee in support of Nicola Zingaretti's candidacy as secretary. Zingaretti, who was the party's left-wing candidate, won the election with 66% of votes.

In February 2020, Zingaretti proposed Cuppi for the office of president of the PD, replacing former Prime Minister Paolo Gentiloni, who was appointed European Commissioner for Economy in the von der Leyen Commission in December 2019. On 22 February, the National Assembly of the party officially elected her as the party's new president.
