= Rosy Bindi =

Italian politician (born 1951)

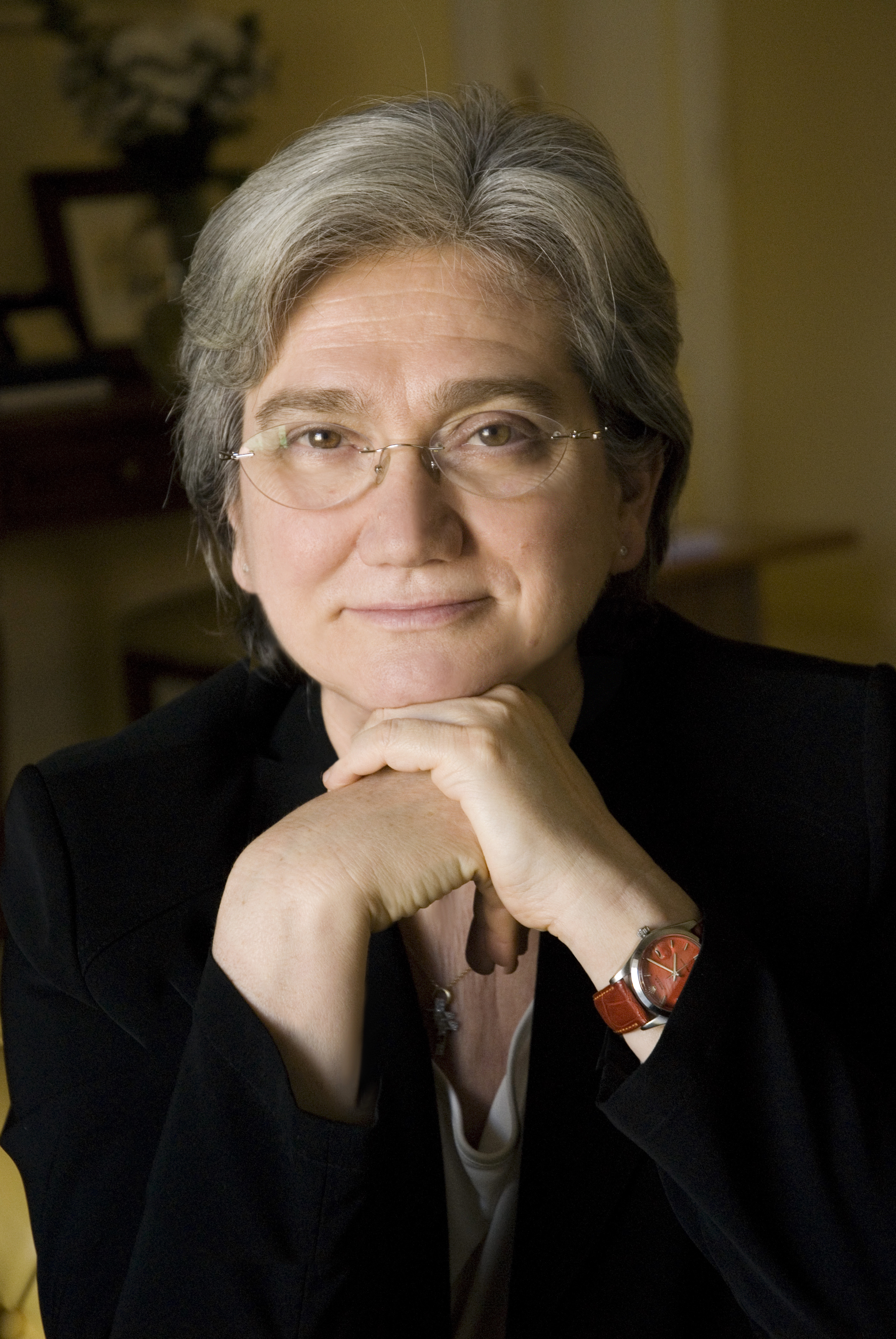

President of the Antimafia Commission
- In office 22 October 2013 – 22 March 2018
- Preceded by: Giuseppe Pisanu
- Succeeded by: Nicola Morra

President of the Democratic Party
- In office 7 November 2009 – 19 April 2013
- Preceded by: Romano Prodi
- Succeeded by: Gianni Cuperlo

Minister for Family Policies
- In office 17 May 2006 – 8 May 2008
- Prime Minister: Romano Prodi
- Preceded by: Roberto Maroni
- Succeeded by: Office abolished

Minister of Health
- In office 17 May 1996 – 26 April 2000
- Prime Minister: Romano Prodi; Massimo D'Alema
- Preceded by: Elio Guzzanti
- Succeeded by: Umberto Veronesi

Member of the Chamber of Deputies
- In office 15 April 1994 – 22 March 2018
- Constituency: Veneto (1994–1996); Tuscany (1996–2013); Calabria (2013–2018)

Member of the European Parliament
- In office 25 July 1989 – 19 July 1994
- Constituency: North–East Italy

Personal details
- Born: 12 February 1951 (age 75) Sinalunga, Italy
- Party: DC (1989–1994); PPI (1994–2002); DL (2002–2007); PD (2007–2018)
- Education: Pro Deo University
- Profession: Political scientist

Maria Rosaria "Rosy" Bindi (Italian pronunciation: [ˈrɔːzi ˈbindi]; born 12 February 1951) is an Italian politician and former president of the Antimafia Commission. She began her political career in Christian Democracy (DC), becoming a member of the European Parliament in 1989. After the dissolution of the DC, she joined the centre-left-leaning Italian People's Party (PPI) in 1994 and Democracy is Freedom – The Daisy (DL) in 2002.

Bindi served as Minister of Health and Minister for Family Policies in the centre-left coalition governments of Romano Prodi and Massimo D'Alema from 1996 to 2000 and 2006 to 2008. In 2007, she was among the founding members of the Democratic Party (PD), and was the party's president from 2009 to 2013. Elected a Chamber of Deputies in 1994, after a total of six legislatures, she did not run for re-election in 2018 and left the PD, ending her political career.

== Early life and education ==
Born in Sinalunga, in the province of Siena, Bindi graduated in political science. Prior to her graduation at LUISS, Bindi enrolled in sociology at the University of Trento, and later became a researcher in administrative law in the Faculty of Political Science at La Sapienza in Rome and then in the Faculty of Law at the University of Siena until 1989. A pupil and later assistant of the lawyer, magistrate, and DC politician Vittorio Bachelet, she was standing near Bachelet when he was assassinated by the Red Brigades in 1980. Bachelet's death contributed to Bindi's anti-mafia activism. In 2020, she said that Bachelet's assassination was the result of the powers that be opposed to the changes of those years.

== Career ==
=== Political career ===
From 1984 to 1989, Bindi held the position of vice-president of Azione Cattolica, the most popular Italian Catholic lay association, with which she continues to be active. In 1989, she joined the DC, the ruling party of the First Italian Republic. In the 1989 European Parliament election in Italy, she was elected a member of the European Parliament, a position she held until 1994. During her period at the European Parliament, she was president of the Petitions and Citizens' Rights Commission. During her career, she was a follower of Giuseppe Dossetti, whom she met in Monteveglio, and was close to Tina Anselmi. After the dissolution of the DC in 1994, Bindi joined the PPI, of which she became regional secretary in Veneto, and later became a leading figure in The Olive Tree, the broad left-to-centre coalition led by Romano Prodi; later in the 2000s, she was also a lead figure of the DL.

Following the coalition's victory in the 1996 Italian general election, Bindi was named Minister of Health, a position she held in the governments led by Massimo D'Alema. During her tenure at the Ministry of Health, through Bindi's circolare of 2 December 1996, (Note: For the circolare in question, see Bindi, Rosy (2 December 1996). "Circolare Bindi del 2 dicembre 1996". Tactical Media Crew (in Italian). Archived from the original on 12 May 2023.) electroshock therapy (ECT) was re-introduced in Italy to treat psychiatrized patients. It was later corrected through Bindi's circolare of 15 February 1999, (Note: For the circolare in question, see Bindi, Rosy (15 February 1999). "Circolare Bindi del 15 febbraio 1999" (PDF). CCDU (in Italian). Archived (PDF) from the original on 1 November 2022.) which limited the use of ECT in particular cases but did not totally revoke it. In 1999, she also reformed Italy's national health service, closely following Anselmi's reform of 1979. In addition to the restrictions on ECT, other reforms included the definitive closure of psychiatric hospitals, the bills on the rights and duties of cohabitations, which brought criticism from Catholics because too radical and from LGBT people because too moderate, and on equality between natural and legitimate children. Under Bindi, the Ministry of Health contributed to the rewriting of Title V of the Constitution of Italy with the redefinition of the relationship between state and territory in the healthcare sector.

In the 2001 Italian general election, Bindi was elected for the third time to the Chamber of Deputies in the constituency of Cortona representing the DL. After the victory of The Union in the 2006 Italian general election, she became Minister for Family Policies, serving in that post until the results of the 2008 Italian general election returned the Silvio Berlusconi-led centre-right coalition back to power. As Minister for Family Policies, she was responsible for the establishment of the First National Conference on the Family. One of the founders and strongest supporters of the PD, the result of a merge between the DC's centre-left-leaning legal successor parties with those of the Italian Communist Party, Bindi competed for the 2007 PD leadership election, and was the distant runner-up; she received 12.93% of the vote cast. She continued to work for the party, leading the Democrats Really faction, until the 2018 Italian general election, when she did not seek re-election, and ended her political career.

From 2008 to 2013, Bindi was the vice-president of the Chamber of Deputies. From 2009 to 2013, she was president of the PD. In the 2009 PD leadership election, Bindi supported eventual winner Pierluigi Bersani. She strongly criticized the 101 party deputies that did not vote for Prodi and thus sank his candidacy during the 2013 Italian presidential election. In the 2013 PD leadership election that ensued after Bersani resigned due to Prodi's failed candidacy, she did not endorse neither eventual winner Matteo Renzi nor Gianni Cuperlo, who succeeded her as the party's president; she said that she did not recognize herself in neither candidate. During the 2017 PD leadership election, Bindi voted for the runner-up Andrea Orlando. Later that same year, she said that the PD under Renzi had betrayed The Olive Tree and described it as Berlusconi's crutch. In 2018, Bindi called for the dissolution of the PD, a position she repeated in 2022. In an interview to La Repubblica on 12 February 2021, Bindi reiterated that she no longer recognized herself in the PD, and that is why she continues to not renew her PD membership card. In an interview to La Stampa that same day, she said: "I think it's time for women to run for party leadership." In the 2023 PD leadership election, Bindi did not endorse neither eventual winner Elly Schlein nor Stefano Bonaccini. Later that same year, she took part to a PD rally after many years. She clarified that she would not return to the party as a member.

=== President of the Antimafia Commission ===
In October 2013, Bindi was elected president of the Antimafia Commission, a position she held until March 2018. In May 2015, the Antimafia Commission led by Bindi published a list of unpresentable candidates, including fellow PD member and Campania president candidate Vincenzo De Luca. In April 2017, the Antimafia Commission headed by Bindi invited the Guardia di Finanza to seize and make public the lists of 35,000 members of the four main Italian Masonic obediences. The lodges described the parliamentary inquiry as a witch-hunt. Bindi called the description made by Giuliano Di Bernardo, a Grand Master of the Grand Orient of Italy lodge at Palazzo Giustiniani in Rome who testified to the Antimafia Commission, a "truly separate order within the state". In December 2017, she said that the Sicilian Mafia and 'Ndrangheta were interested to Masonry. According to the Antimafia Commission, the secrecy of Freemasonry "is inconceivable in a democratic state". The final report, which said it was not about Masonry itself but rather "on the relational aspect of the mafias", concluded that there were organizations in which "there has been a sort of 'surrender' towards the mafia", with a control system which "has often proven ineffective ... above all due to the lack of will in this sense".

In March 2017, Bindi was the head of an Antimafia Commission about the alleged ties between the then Juventus chairman Andrea Agnelli and the 'Ndrangheta within the inquiry about alleged tickets sales to 'Ndrangheta members. Bindi commented: "The mafias in Italy even reach Juventus, this is clear." A supporter of Juventus rival Fiorentina, Bindi ironically congratulated Agnelli for winning the 2017 Coppa Italia final and sent her best wishes for the 2017 UEFA Champions League final but said that in the league she "must respect the pluralism of the fans". It later emerged that a wiretap implicating Agnelli, which Bindi had cited during a parliamentary audition in response to the objections of Agnelli's lawyer and the doubts of the then PD senator Stefano Esposito, (Note: For the report in shorthand, see "XVII Legislatura – Commissione parlamentare di inchiesta sul fenomeno delle mafie e sulle altre associazioni criminali, anche straniere – Resoconto stenografico – Seduta n. 196 di Mercoledì 15 marzo 2017". Camera dei Deputati (in Italian). 15 March 2017. Archived from the original on 25 May 2022.) was fabricated by the public prosecutor Giuseppe Pecoraro, a supporter of Juventus rival Napoli who had said that he hoped Juventus would not win the scudetto, and Agnelli and the club were acquitted of the charge. Although Juventus was the only club investigated by sports justice, the Antimafia Commission report also cited Catania, Genoa, Lazio, and Napoli, and concluded that "the largely criminal background of the representatives of organized groups is the ideal humus to allow the infiltration of mafia-type organized crime" and that these cases "paint a varied picture". Bindi commented: "Football, as a body, is not healthy enough to consider itself immune from mafias, it is a world rich in money and the possibility of creating consensus." (Note: The report read: "The power of intimidation of the ultras fans within the 'stadium territory' is often exercised in ways that reproduce the mafia method; together with this, the condition of apparent extra-territoriality of the curves with respect to the authority has allowed the groups to acquire and strengthen their power towards the sports clubs and their employees or members. ... The situation is further aggravated from the point of view of the clubs, from the social base of the fans themselves, made up of significant contingents of people with criminal convictions, in some cases close to 30% of the total, according to the estimates of the forces of police. In the corners, in fact, the anarchy in the management of spaces, compared to the criteria for assigning seats dictated by the ticket sales system, for the most extreme fans is also functional in making the identification of individuals more difficult, since the mapping of the stadium sectors is effectively prevented on the basis of the match between the name of the buyer and the seat assigned by the computer reservation system. Ultras groups are often made up of individuals with serious criminal records or, in any case, with personal histories characterized by aggressive and antisocial behaviour, ready to give rise to violence, outside the stadium or in the stands, against the opposing fans or against the forces of order, to unsportsmanlike gestures, racist chants, use of smoke bombs or other dangerous instruments or, more generally, to initiatives sanctioned by federal regulations.")

=== Post-retirement activities ===
Bindi's post-retirement activities included reports on mafia and information and on confiscated assets, the legislative proposals on the anti-mafia code and on witnesses of justice, the diffusion of the first list of the unpresentable in 2015, the seizure of the lists of Masonic lodges, the contribution to the working group on excommunication of mafias established in the Vatican, and the publication of some books, including La salute impaziente, Famiglia, Cattolica e democratica, and Quel che è di Cesare.

In 2018, Bindi was made honorary president of the Fundamental Health Law Association, which was founded together with health policy experts, doctors, epidemiologists, and jurists in defense of public health. She published several documents on the effects of the COVID-19 pandemic in Italy on the national health service and the risks of privatization of the public service. In 2020, Bindi joined the scientific committee of lavialibera, a bimonthly information and in-depth magazine on mafias, corruption, the environment, and migration directed by Luigi Ciotti. In May 2021, she joined a working group on excommunication of mafias established in the Vatican at the Dicastery for Promoting Integral Human Development, with the aim of following up on the excommunication of mafiosi pronounced by Pope Francis in Calabria on 21 June 2014. In June 2021, Bindi became a professor at the Pontifical University Antonianum, where she carries out training and research activities on the topics of legality and the fight against mafias in the analysis and study of criminal and mafia phenomenon, in collaboration with the Department of Liberating Maria from the mafias of the Pontifical Academy of Mary.

== Political views ==
During her political career, Bindi was considered a representative of left-leaning Christian democracy and part of the Christian left, interested to the dialogue between Catholics and secularists. Although she left politics and the PD in 2018, Bindi remains close to the party and is a political commentator interested to the politics of the PD and the broader Italian left-wing. In the context of the 2021 Italian government crisis, she defended Giuseppe Conte and criticized Matteo Renzi. She said: "Meetings with my universe of reference, the Catholic world, the anti-mafia, the schools, are always on the agenda and held remotely. Now it will be Mario Draghi who will take us out of the [COVID-19] pandemic. ... I respect the person and I also believe that he is the right man. But let me tell you two things. I would have given Giuseppe Conte another chance. If it is true that there were some shortcomings, there is no doubt that the war was unleashed against him. ... I am intrigued by the fact that Matteo Renzi today manages to say, quite with impunity, that he paved the way for Draghi. He closed it to Conte. His target was Conte. Stop. And to achieve it he made Italy risk its neck."

In December 2023, Bindi said that the European Union can be reborn through criticism of capitalism. About the relations between capitalism and the European Union, Bindi stated: "We thought that democracy had won [in 1989], but instead capitalism won. Europe has lost its social function and the ability to guide the rules of the market and the liberal right has imposed its development model, with the capitalism of shareholders and profit. We cannot help but make this self-criticism, also in reference to the Third Way, which has not been able to react adequately." About liberal democracy and the threats to it, she said: "Democracy is faltering on this continent, public policies and policies on common goods, from work to welfare, have been backwards since the 1980s, and when a democracy no longer guarantees respect for fundamental rights, the mechanism of individualism is triggered." On the issue of the Russian invasion of Ukraine, Bindi took a classic Italian Catholic pacifist view, saying: "Now the war is inside Europe, is the EU aware that it is the force of politics and not of weapons that can end it?" On the Middle East and the 2023 escalation of the Israeli–Palestine conflict, she stated: "It's humiliating to see European leaders going to Tel Aviv to say different things." In April 2024, ahead of the 2024 European Parliament election in Italy, Bindi defended the PD candidates, such as Marco Tarquinio and Cecilia Strada, who held different views from the party on issues like Ukraine and war, saying that voters shared Tarquinio and Strada's views more than the party's leaders.

In response to Gennaro Sangiuliano, who defined himself as both anti-communist and anti-fascist, and asked Bindi to do the same in January 2024, she said: "I am definitely anti-fascist. I always say that I am a woman of the left but I have never been a communist, however in my small way with my political militancy, from the DC to the PD, I believe I have contributed to ensuring that communism, which was present in the life of our country, was a factor integral part of Italian democracy. The profound difference is that the Italian communists wrote the Constitution. The Italian fascists did not." About the Meloni government, of which Sangiuliano was then part as Minister of Culture, she further commented: "This government is not only not anti-fascist, it is also anti-republican." She further explained to Sangiuliano that while the Constitution of Italy recognizes private property and profit as legitimate, it attributes a social purpose to them. She said: "The richness of our Constitution has a social purpose. There are common goods and public goods which are more important than individual goods. Since this lesson has been forgotten, school, public health, safety in the workplace, and on the streets have been abandoned. And therefore inequalities increase."

== Electoral history ==
Election	House	Constituency	Party	Votes	Result
1989	European Parliament	North–East Italy	DC	211,170	Elected
1994	Chamber of Deputies	Veneto 1	PPI	– (Note: Elected in a closed list proportional representation system)	Elected
1996	Chamber of Deputies	Cortona	Ulivo	60,443	Elected
2001	Chamber of Deputies	Cortona	Ulivo	56,452	Elected
2006	Chamber of Deputies	Tuscany-at-large	Ulivo	–	Elected
2008	Chamber of Deputies	Tuscany-at-large	PD	–	Elected
2013	Chamber of Deputies	Calabria-at-large	PD	–	Elected

=== First-past-the-post elections ===
1996 general election (C): Tuscany — Cortona
Candidate	Coalition	Votes	%
Rosy Bindi	The Olive Tree	60,443	65.1
Anna Duchini	Pole for Freedoms	29,193	31.4
Others		3,287	3.5
Total		92,923	100.0

2001 general election (C): Tuscany — Cortona
Candidate	Coalition	Votes	%
Rosy Bindi	The Olive Tree	56,452	61.5
Leonardo Giomarelli	House of Freedoms	32,623	35.5
Others		2,794	3.0
Total		91,869	100.0

== Personal life ==
Little is known about Bindi's private life, other than she is not married and has no children. Controversy ensued in 2006 after the then National Alliance senator Maurizio Saia implied that Bindi was a lesbian and thus was not suitable to be Minister for Family Policies. His words, which were uttered during a local TV programme, were unanimously condemned. In a 2011 interview to the weekly A, she opened up about her personal life, stating that she has had two to three boyfriends. A practising Catholic, one of her interests is theology. Bindi is a supporter of Fiorentina.

Bindi was often the target of Silvio Berlusconi's sexist jibes, (Note: In 2009, Berlusconi's sexist jibes attracted international attention, including from BBC News, when he referred to Bindi as being "more beautiful than intelligent". It led about 100,000 women to protest Berlusconi, as part of the "I'm not at your disposal" campaign in support of Bindi. In 2010, during a visit to the private Università degli Studi eCampus in Novedrate, Berlusconi again insulted Bindi. Referring to some female students who had been invited by email, Berlusconi said: "Here are some beautiful girls who have graduated with maximum marks and they don't look like Rosy Bindi." Bindi responded: "I congratulate the students who have graduated. As for the Prime Minister's remarks, I will only note, sadly, that among the many signs that his rule is coming to an end we now have this repeatedly wearing evidence of his vulgarity." That same year, Bindi was also the subject of a joke by Berlusconi that ended in a bestemmia. When Berlusconi died in June 2023, she recalled: "['I'm not a woman at your disposal'] was an unthought reaction, they are words that come out because you have them inside. I never made peace or met Berlusconi again after that episode, he never apologized but I have no regrets, I don't know if I would have accepted his apologies.") and from other centre-right coalition politicians, such as Vittorio Sgarbi, (Note: One of Berlusconi's sexist jibs towards Bindi was on an on-air broadcast of Porta a Porta on 7 October 2009, when Berlusconi sarcastically told Bindi that she was more beautiful than intelligent, to which Bindi replied that she was not a woman at his disposal. Sgarbi later stated that this wording was his own idea, which he had elaborated with Mino Martinazzoli during the 1990s.) who once referred to the Italian president Sergio Mattarella as "the unexpressed twin of Rosy Bindi", whose role as president of the Antimafia Commission he criticized. When Berlusconi died in June 2023, she said that "sanctification is not good for Italy, national mourning is inappropriate", arguing that "Berlusconism must be elaborated", and that the national day of mourning was "disrespectful toward the majority" who opposed him. Her views were shared by other individuals, including among others Andrea Crisanti, Luigi de Magistris, and Tomaso Montanari. (Note: As a host on Un giorno da pecora on Rai Radio 1, Bindi stated that she agreed with a state funeral but had reservations about national mourning. She explained: "The accounts of Berlusconism were not made when he was alive, I hope they will be made now. Berlusconi was not just a politician, he was an entrepreneur in a certain way, it brings with it many mysteries and I cannot extol its entrepreneurial abilities. ... If he hadn't had the protection of politics he wouldn't have been a great entrepreneur. ... State funerals are planned and it is right that there should be but national mourning for a divisive person like Berlusconi was, in my opinion, not an appropriate choice." On the La7 TV programme Tagadà, Bindi criticized the state funeral of Berlusconi, saying that state funerals are for people who united, not divided, the country. She said: "Prodi is right to go, it's a sign of respect for the institutions. I wish Berlusconi to rest in peace, I know what it means for him to lose his parents: there is understanding for the man but the sanctification that is happening in Rai does not correspond to the truth. She further stated: "He was the first populist of this country. He certainly wasn't a promoter of women, on the contrary he used them in every sense. He told me I was more beautiful than intelligent. The sense of ownership he had towards institutions was identical to that towards women. He was in love with himself and anyone who was not at his disposal, or the subject of his fascination, did not fall into his good graces.")

== Works ==
- Ugo Biggeri, A. Bondi, Luigino Bruni, Rosy Bindi, Francesco Gesualdi, Don Milani alle radici dell’economia alternativa, U. Biggeri e S. Siliani (editors), Milano, 2024, Giangiacomo Feltrinelli Editore.
- Rosy Bindi, La salute impaziente, Jaca Book, 2005, ISBN 88-16-40597-X.
- Rosy Bindi, Famiglia, Vittorio Sammarco (editor), La Scuola, 2007, ISBN 88-350-2137-5.
- Rosy Bindi, Cattolica e democratica, Arnoldo Mondadori Editore, 2007, ISBN 88-04-57376-7.
- Rosy Bindi, Giovanna Casadio, Quel che è di Cesare, Laterza, 2009, ISBN 88-420-9107-3.
- with Chiara Rinaldi, Una sanità uguale per tutti, Solferino, 2026.

== Notes ==
Italian Chamber of Deputies
Preceded by Title jointly held	Member of the Chamber of Deputies; 1994–2018	Incumbent
Political offices
Preceded by Elio Guzzanti	Minister of Health; 1996–2000	Succeeded by Umberto Veronesi
Preceded by Roberto Maroni	Minister for Family; 2006–2008	Succeeded by –
