= Valeria Alessandrini =

Italian politician

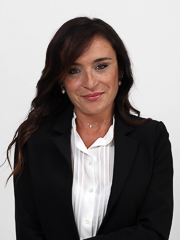

Member of the Senate of the Republic
- In office 12 March 2020 – 13 October 2022
- Constituency: Terni

Personal details
- Born: 26 August 1975 Terni, Italy
- Party: Lega Nord

Valeria Alessandrini (born 26 August 1975) is an Italian politician.

== Political career ==
Alessandrini served as an assessor in Terni and was elected to the Legislative Assembly of Umbria in 2019. She was elected to the Italian Senate in 2020 in a by-election to succeed Donatella Tesei.
