= Franco Ortolani =

Italian politician (1943–2019)

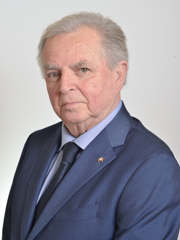

Member of the Senate of the Republic for Naples–San Carlo all'Arena district
- In office 28 March 2018 – 22 November 2019
- Preceded by: constituency established
- Succeeded by: Sandro Ruotolo
- Constituency: Campania 7

Personal details
- Born: Franco Ortolani; 29 August 1943 Molinella, Bologna, Emilia-Romagna, Italy
- Died: 22 November 2019 (aged 76) Rome, Italy
- Party: Five Star Movement
- Education: University of Naples Federico II

Franco Ortolani (29 August 1943 – 22 November 2019) was an Italian politician who served in the Italian Senate for the Five Star Movement from 2018 to 2019.

== Career ==
Ortolani was a candidate for the Five Star Movement in the 2018 general election, and was elected in Naples after receiving over 100,000 votes.

== Death ==
He died from cancer in Rome in the night of 22 November 2019. He was succeeded in a by-election in 2020 by Sandro Ruotolo of the centre-left coalition.
