= Marzabotto =

Italian comune in Emilia-Romagna

- Comune
- Comune di Marzabotto
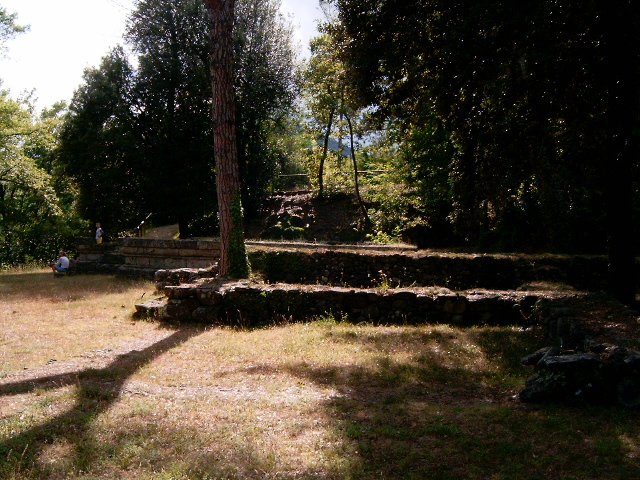
- Marzabotto acropolis

- Coat of arms

- Location within Italy Location within Emilia-Romagna
- Coordinates: 44°20′20″N 11°12′20″E
- Country: Italy
- Region: Emilia-Romagna
- Metropolitan city: Bologna (BO)
- Frazioni: see list

Government
  - Mayor: Valentina Cuppi

Area
  - Total: 74 km^{2} (29 sq mi)
- Elevation: 130 m (430 ft)

Population (30 September 2017)
  - Total: 6,826
  - Density: 92/km^{2} (240/sq mi)
- Demonym: Marzabottesi
- Time zone: UTC+1 (CET)
  - Summer (DST): UTC+2 (CEST)
- Postal code: 52100
- Dialing code: 051
- Patron saint: Saint Joseph and Saint Charles
- Saint day: March 19
- Website: Official website

Marzabotto (Medial Mountain Bolognese: Marzabòt) is a small town and comune in the Italian region of Emilia-Romagna, part of the Metropolitan City of Bologna. It is located 27 kilometres (17 mi) south-southwest of Bologna by rail, and lies in the valley of the Reno. The area includes the site of an ancient Etruscan city and also the place of a modern massacre that took place there during World War II.

== Etruscan city ==
In and below the grounds of the Villa Aria, close to the city, are the remains of an Etruscan town of the 5th century BC, Kainua, protected on the west by the mountains, on the south-east by the river, which by a change of course has destroyed about half of it. The acropolis was just below the villa: here remains of temples were found.

The town lay below the modern high-road and was laid out on a rectangular plan divided by main streets into eight quarters, and these in turn into blocks or insulae. Necropoleis were found on the east and north of the site. The place was partially inhabited later by the Gauls, but was not occupied by the Romans.

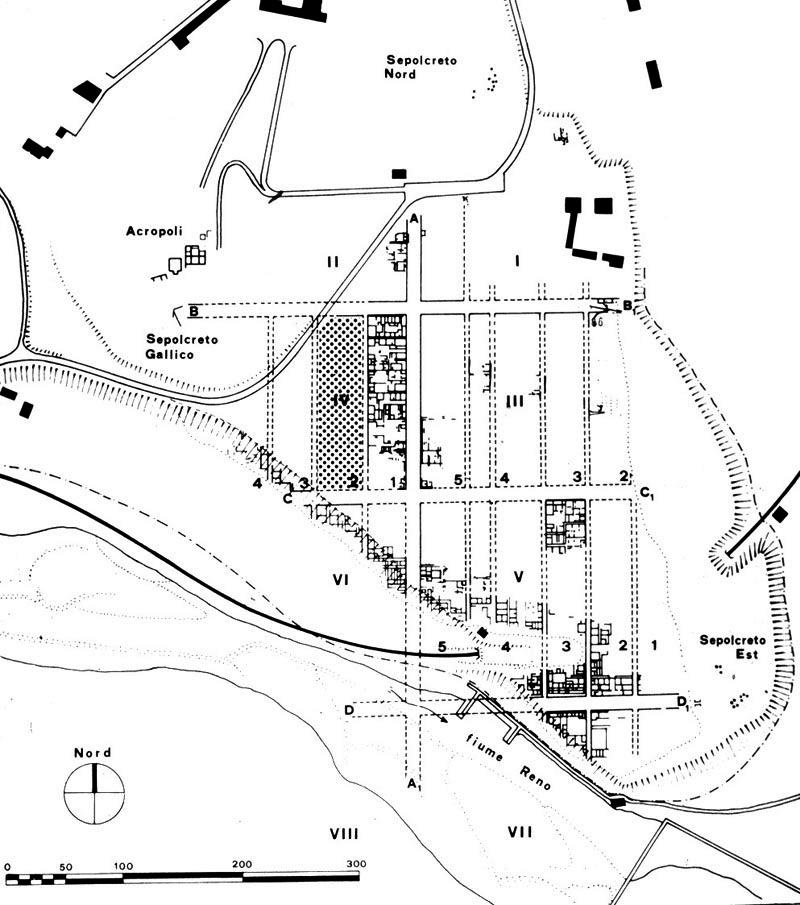
Map of the Etruscan site

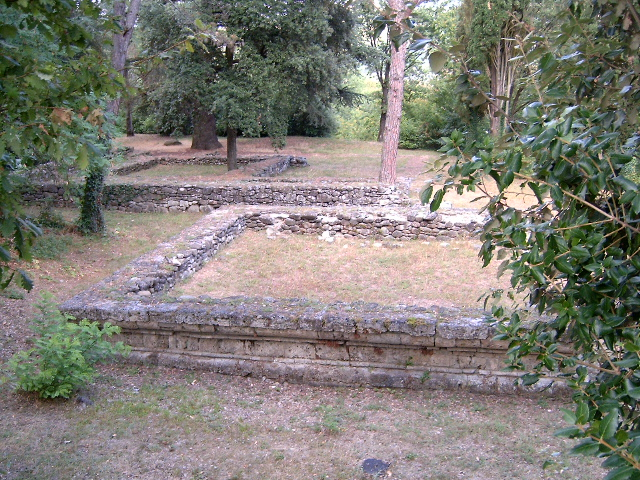
Remains of Etruscan temples at Marzabotto

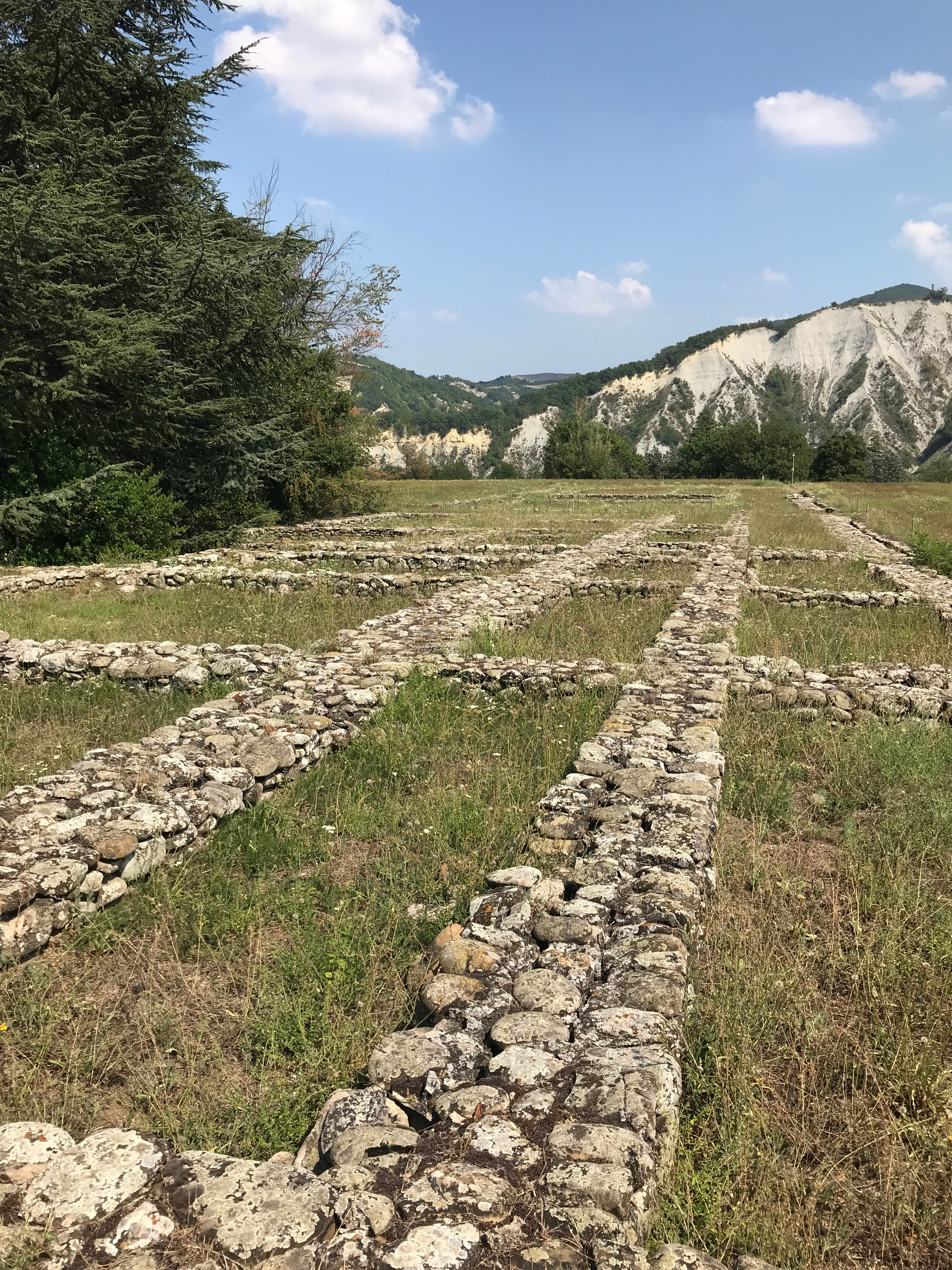
Remains of Etruscan necropolis at Marzabotto

== World War II massacre ==
On September 29, 1944, during the World War II German occupation of Italy, the town was the site of the worst massacre of civilians committed by the Waffen SS in Italy. In reprisal of the local support given to the partisans and the resistance movement, soldiers of the SS-Panzer-Aufklärungsabteilung 16, killed systematically hundreds of civilians in Marzabotto, and in the adjacent Grizzana Morandi and Monzuno. The town was awarded the Gold Medal of Military Valour for this episode. Sculptor Nicola Zamboni created a large monument in the city in 1975 in front of the town hall.
