= Maurizio Leo =

Italian politician (born 1955)

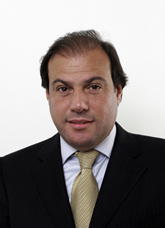
- Leo in 2008

Member of the Chamber of Deputies
- Incumbent
- Assumed office 13 October 2022
- Constituency: Sicily 2
- In office 30 May 2001 – 14 March 2013
- Constituency: Piedmont 2 (2001–2006); Piedmont 1 (2006–2013)

Personal details
- Born: 25 July 1955 (age 70)
- Party: Brothers of Italy

Maurizio Leo (born 25 July 1955) is an Italian politician of Brothers of Italy serving as a member of the Chamber of Deputies. He first served from 2001 to 2013, representing the National Alliance. He returned to the chamber in the 2022 general election, and was appointed deputy minister of economy and finance.
