= Vittoria Bogo Deledda =

Italian politician (1967–2020)

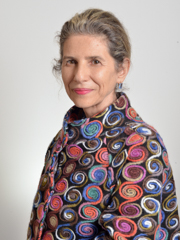

Senator of the Legislature XVIII of Italy
- Incumbent
- Assumed office March 2018
- Constituency: Sardegna

Personal details
- Born: 1 January 1967
- Died: 17 March 2020 (aged 53)
- Party: Five Star Movement

Vittoria Bogo Deledda (1 January 1967 – 17 March 2020) was an Italian politician of the populist Five Star Movement, who served as a Senator. She was a member of the Legislature XVIII of Italy.

== Biography ==
After graduating from the "Enrico Fermi" scientific high school in Nuoro, he obtained two degrees, in sociology and political science, at the La Sapienza University of Rome. In 1992 she was hired by the municipal administration of Budoni as head of Social Services, Culture and Tourism.

She died on 17 March 2020, at the age of 53, of cancer.

== Election as Senator ==
She was elected senator under the Five Star Movement in the XVIII legislature in the political elections of 4 March 2018, in the single-member college Sardinia - 03 (Sassari-Olbia). With 103,823 votes, she was the candidate elected with the most votes in all of Sardinia.
