= Paolo Gentiloni =

Italian politician (born 1954)

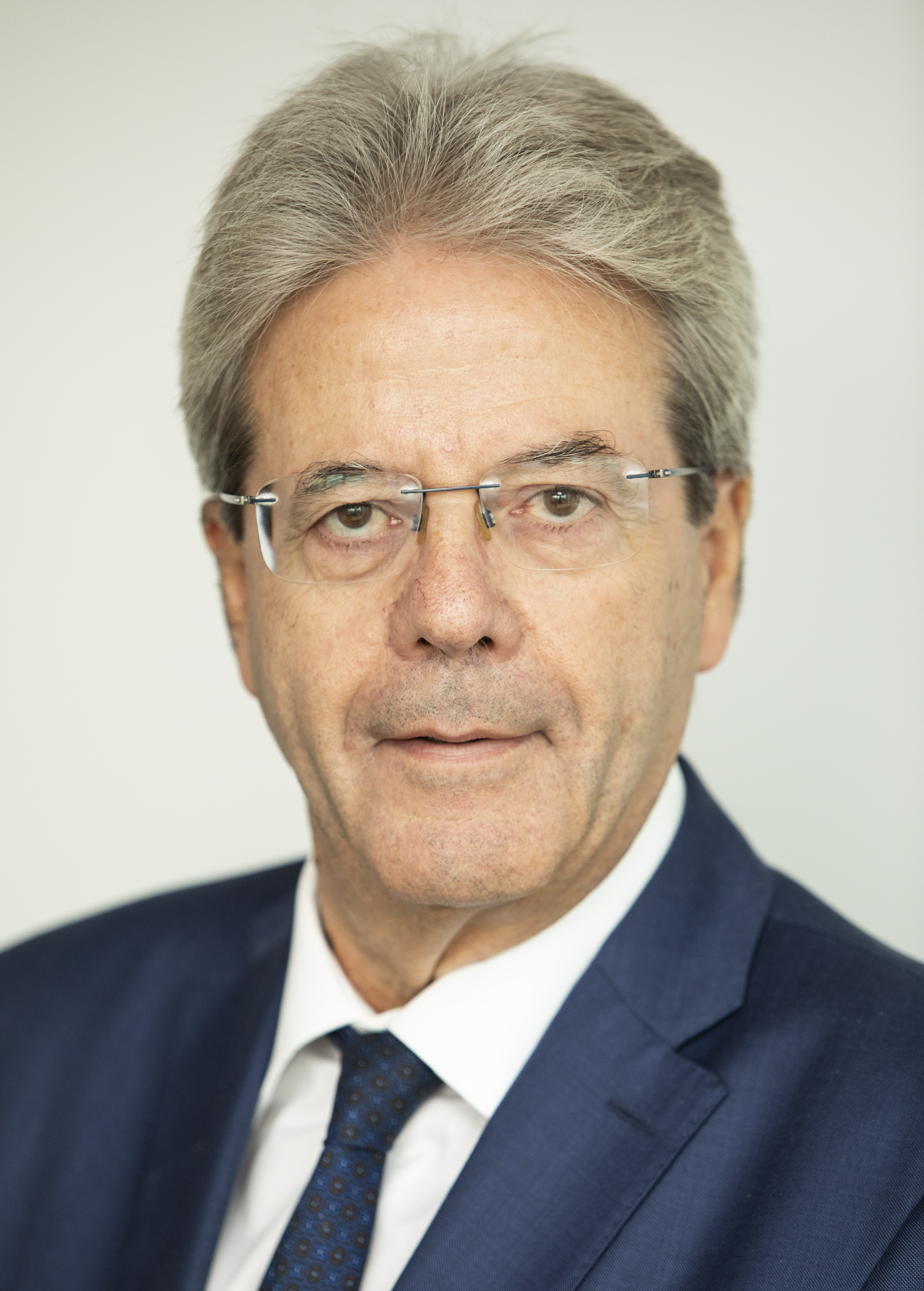
- Official portrait, 2019

European Commissioner for Economy
- In office 1 December 2019 – 30 November 2024
- Commission: Von der Leyen I
- Preceded by: Pierre Moscovici
- Succeeded by: Valdis Dombrovskis

Prime Minister of Italy
- In office 12 December 2016 – 1 June 2018
- President: Sergio Mattarella
- Preceded by: Matteo Renzi
- Succeeded by: Giuseppe Conte

Minister of Foreign Affairs
- In office 31 October 2014 – 12 December 2016
- Prime Minister: Matteo Renzi
- Preceded by: Federica Mogherini
- Succeeded by: Angelino Alfano

Minister of Communications
- In office 17 May 2006 – 8 May 2008
- Prime Minister: Romano Prodi
- Preceded by: Mario Landolfi
- Succeeded by: Claudio Scajola

President of the Democratic Party
- In office 17 March 2019 – 22 February 2020
- Secretary: Nicola Zingaretti
- Preceded by: Matteo Orfini
- Succeeded by: Valentina Cuppi

Member of the Chamber of Deputies
- In office 30 May 2001 – 2 December 2019
- Constituency: Piedmont (2001–2006); Lazio (2006–2018); Rome (2018–2019)

Personal details
- Born: Paolo Gentiloni Silveri; 22 November 1954 (age 71) Rome, Italy
- Party: MLS (1976–1981); PdUP (1981–1984); Dem (1999–2002); DL (2002–2007); PD (since 2007)
- Height: 1.77 m (5 ft 10 in)
- Spouse: Emanuela Mauro (m. 1989)
- Education: Sapienza University of Rome

Paolo Gentiloni Silveri (Italian pronunciation: [ˈpaːolo dʒentiˈloːni]; born 22 November 1954) is an Italian politician who was European Commissioner for Economy in the Von der Leyen Commission from 1 December 2019 to 30 November 2024. He had previously served as prime minister of Italy from December 2016 to June 2018.

After a lengthy career in local politics, Gentiloni was elected to the Chamber of Deputies in 2001. He served in the Cabinet under Romano Prodi as Minister of Communications from 2006 to 2008. In 2007, he was one of the senior founding members of the Democratic Party, and went on to become party president from 2019 to 2020. Gentiloni later served as Minister of Foreign Affairs from 2014 to 2016 in the Cabinet of Matteo Renzi. Following Renzi's resignation in the wake of a failed constitutional referendum, the Democratic Party held discussions on his replacement. Eventually, Gentiloni won support from his colleagues, and President Sergio Mattarella appointed him Prime Minister on 12 December 2016.

Despite being considered a caretaker prime minister upon his appointment, during his time in office Gentiloni successfully delivered major reforms that had been delayed for many years, including the implementation of the advance healthcare directive, the reform of the voluntary sector and the passage of a new electoral law. He also introduced stricter rules on immigration and social security, in an attempt to counteract the European migration crisis. In foreign policy, Gentiloni built on his time as foreign minister by projecting a strong Europeanist stance, whilst at the same time building close relations with the Arab countries of the Persian Gulf, and notably overseeing a normalisation of Italian relations with India after years of tensions. Gentiloni resigned as Prime Minister following the 2018 election. In September 2019, he was nominated by the Conte Government to become Italy's new European Commissioner, and was given the key portfolio of overseeing the European Union Economy.

== Early life and family ==
A descendant of Count Gentiloni Silveri, Paolo Gentiloni is related to the Italian politician Vincenzo Ottorino Gentiloni, chamberlain of Pope Pius X, who was the leader of the conservative Catholic Electoral Union and a key ally of the long-time prime minister Giovanni Giolitti. If the Kingdom of Italy still existed, Gentiloni would have the titles of Nobile of Filottrano, Nobile of Cingoli, and Nobile of Macerata.

Gentiloni was born in Rome in 1954, during his childhood he attended a Montessori institute, where he became a friend of Agnese Moro, the daughter of Aldo Moro, a Christian democratic leader and Prime Minister. During the early 1970s he attended the Classical Lyceum Torquato Tasso in Rome; he graduated in political sciences at the Sapienza University of Rome. Gentiloni was a professional journalist before entering politics.

In 1989 he married Emanuela Mauro, an architect; they have no children. Gentiloni speaks fluent English, French and German.

== Early political career ==
During the 1970s, Paolo Gentiloni was a member of the Student Movement (Movimento Studentesco), a far-left youth organization led by Mario Capanna; when Capanna founded the Proletarian Democracy party, Gentiloni did not follow him, and joined the Workers' Movement for Socialism (Movimento Lavoratori per il Socialismo; MLS), a far-left Maoist group, of which he became the regional secretary for Lazio. In 1981 Gentiloni followed the MLS into the Proletarian Unity Party (Partito di Unità Proletaria; PdUP), remaining a member until its dissolution three years later.

Gentiloni slowly abandoned far-left ideals, sharing more moderate views and becoming particularly involved in green politics and ecologism. During those years he became a close friend of Chicco Testa who helped Gentiloni to become director of La Nuova Ecologia ("The New Ecology"), the official newspaper of Legambiente. As director of this ecologist newspaper he met the young leader of Federation of the Greens, Francesco Rutelli and became, along with Roberto Giachetti, Michele Anzaldi and Filippo Sensi, a member of the so-called "Rutelli boys", a group formed by Rutelli's closest advisors and supporters.

=== Rome City Council ===
In 1993 he became Rutelli's spokesman during his campaign to become Mayor of Rome; after the election, which saw a strong victory by Rutelli against Gianfranco Fini, leader of the neo-fascist Italian Social Movement, Gentiloni was appointed Great Jubilee and Tourism Councillor in the Rome City Council. Rutelli was reelected in 1997, with 985,000 popular votes, the highest share in the history of the city.

Gentiloni held his office until January 2001, when Rutelli resigned to become the centre-left candidate to the premiership in the 2001 general election. However Rutelli was soundly defeated by former prime minister Silvio Berlusconi with 35.1% of votes against 49.6%.

=== Member of Parliament and Minister ===
In the 2001 general election, Gentiloni was elected as a Member of Parliament and started his national political career. In 2002 he was a founding member of the Christian leftist The Daisy party, being the party's communications spokesman for five years. From 2005 until 2006, he was Chairman of the Broadcasting Services Watchdog Committee; the committee oversees the activity of state broadcaster RAI, which is publicly funded. He was reelected in the 2006 election as a member of The Olive Tree, the political coalition led by the Bolognese economist Romano Prodi. After the centre-left's victory, Gentiloni served as Minister for Communications in Prodi's second government from 2006 until 2008.

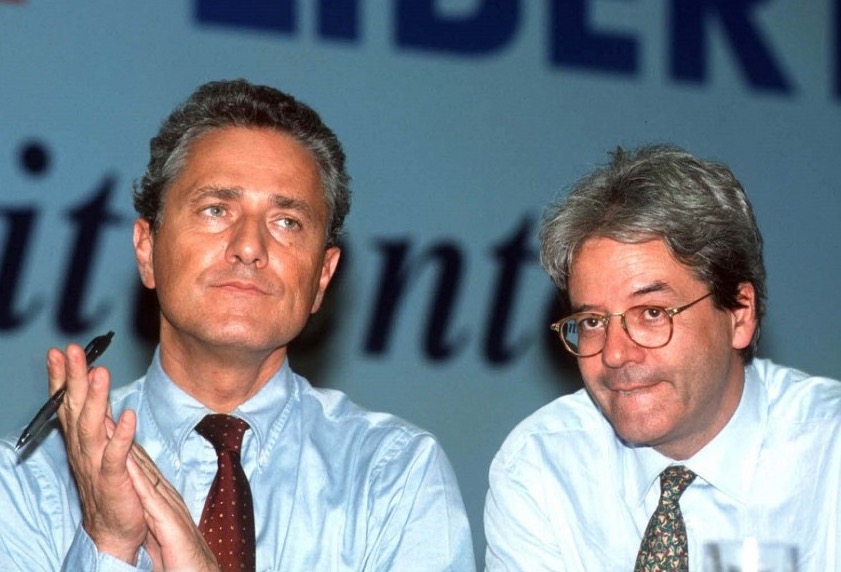
Paolo Gentiloni with Francesco Rutelli.

As minister Gentiloni planned to reform the Italian television system, with the defeat of the Gasparri Law, the previous reform proposed by the centre-right lawmaker Maurizio Gasparri. The reform provided, between other things, the reduction of advertising. However, in 2007, the government suffered a crisis and lost its majority, so the reform had never been approved. The "Gentiloni Reform" bill of 12 October 2006, established the existence of a market dominance where a subject exceeded 45% of advertising sales and abolished the "integrated communication system" (SIC) introduced by the Gasparri Law. The law also lowered the maximum advertising threshold for TV from 18% to 16%, to encourage redistribution, and provided for the transfer to digital of one network each for RAI and Mediaset by 2009, thus freeing up frequencies and imposing the obligation to sell (Europa 7 affair). However, the bill will not be approved.

In May 2007 a second reform text was launched that concerns only the RAI (Senate Act no. 1588/2007). Among the main aspects, the property should have passed from the Ministry of Economy to a foundation; there would also have been a separation between TV financed by the fee and TV financed by advertising, and the rules for appointing the board of directors would have changed. However, the reform will not be approved.

He was one of the 45 members of the national founding committee of the Democratic Party in 2007, formed by the union of the social democrats Democrats of the Left and the Christian leftist The Daisy. Gentiloni was re-elected in the 2008 general election, which saw the victory of the conservative coalition led by Silvio Berlusconi. In this legislature, he was a member of the Committee regarding Transport and Telecommunications.

On 6 April 2013 he ran in the primary election to select the center-left candidate for Mayor of Rome, placing third, with 14% of votes, after Ignazio Marino (51%), who became mayor, and the journalist David Sassoli, who gained 28%. After the defeat in the primary election, many political commentators believed that Gentiloni's career as a prominent member of the centre-left was over.

However, Gentiloni was elected again to the Chamber of Deputies in the 2013 general election, as part of the centre-left coalition Italy. Common Good led by Pier Luigi Bersani, Secretary of the PD. In 2013, after Bersani's resignation as secretary, Gentiloni supported the Mayor of Florence, Matteo Renzi, in the Democratic Party leadership election.

== Minister of Foreign Affairs ==
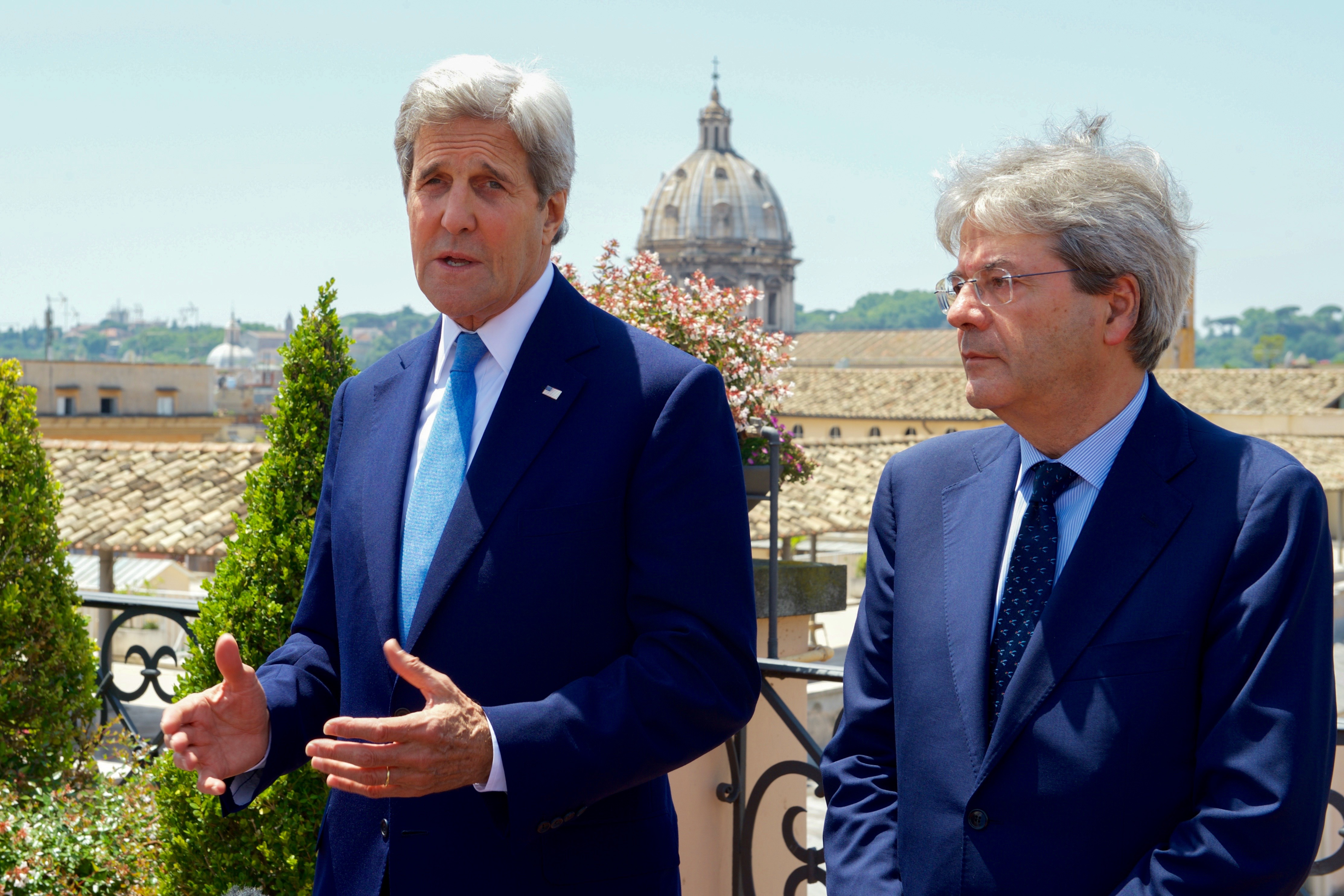
Gentiloni with United States Secretary of State John Kerry in Rome in June 2016.

On 31 October 2014 Gentiloni was appointed Minister of Foreign Affairs by Prime Minister Matteo Renzi; Gentiloni succeeded Federica Mogherini, who became High Representative of the Union for Foreign Affairs and Security Policy. He took office two months before Italy's rotating presidency of the Council of the European Union ended in December 2014. At the time of his appointment, Gentiloni had not been mentioned in political circles as a candidate. Renzi had reportedly wanted to replace Mogherini with another woman, to preserve gender parity in his 16-member cabinet. Moreover, Gentiloni was not known as a specialist in international diplomacy.

As foreign minister, Gentiloni tried to trace an intermediate path for Italy in the scenario of multiple crises that surrounds it, from the wars in Libya and Syria to tensions with Russia. Gentiloni showed a strong closeness to his US counterpart John Kerry and kept open a channel of dialogue with the Russian Sergei Lavrov.

On 13 February 2015, during an interview on Sky TG24, Gentiloni stated that "if needed, Italy will be ready to fight in Libya against the Islamic State, because the Italian government can not accept the idea that there is an active terrorist threat only a few hours from Italy by boat." The following day Gentiloni was threatened by ISIL, which accused him of being a crusader, minister of an enemy country.

In March 2015 Gentiloni visited Mexico and Cuba and met First Secretary of the Communist Party of Cuba Raúl Castro, ensuring the Italian support for the normalization of relations between Cuba and the United States.

On 11 July 2015, a car bomb exploded outside the Italian consulate in the Egyptian capital Cairo, resulting in at least one death and four people injured; the Islamic State claimed responsibility. On the same day Gentiloni stated that "Italy will not be intimidated" and would continue the fight against terrorism.

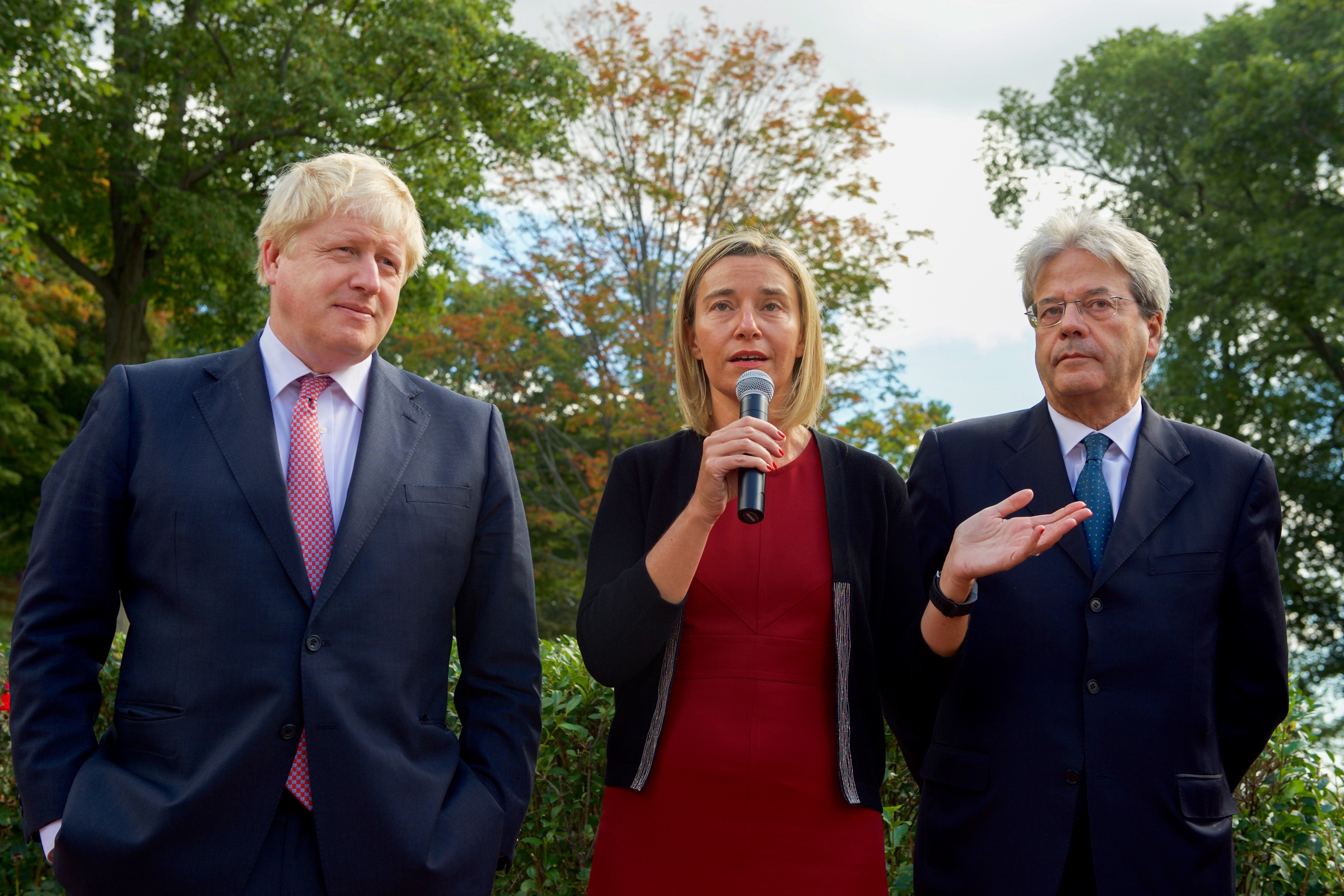
Gentiloni with Boris Johnson and Federica Mogherini in September 2016.

In December 2015, Gentiloni hosted a peace conference in Rome with the representatives from both governments of Libya involved in the civil war, but also from the United Nations, the United States and Russia.

As foreign minister, Gentiloni had to confront various abductions of Italian citizens. In January 2015, he negotiated the release of Vanessa Marzullo and Greta Ramelli, two Italian students and activists who had been held hostage by Syrian terrorists for 168 days.

Another high-profile case was the murder of Giulio Regeni, an Italian Cambridge University graduate student killed in Cairo following his abduction on 25 January 2016; He was a Ph.D. student researching Egypt's independent trade unions. Regeni's mutilated and half-naked corpse was found in a ditch alongside the Cairo-Alexandria highway on the outskirts of Cairo on 3 February 2016. His recovered body showed signs of extreme torture like contusions and abrasions, extensive bruising from kicks, punches, and assault with a stick, more than two dozen bone fractures, a brain hemorrhage and a broken cervical vertebra, which ultimately caused death. The Egyptian police was strongly suspected of involvement in his murder in Europe, although Egypt's media and government deny this, alleging secret undercover agents belonging to the Muslim Brotherhood in Egypt carried out the crime in order to embarrass the Egyptian government and destabilize relations between Italy and Egypt.

In the 2016 United Nations Security Council election, Gentiloni and his Dutch counterpart Bert Koenders agreed on splitting a two-year term on the United Nations Security Council after the United Nations General Assembly was deadlocked on whether to choose Italy or the Netherlands following five rounds of voting for the last remaining 2017–18 seat. Such arrangements were relatively common in deadlocked elections starting in the late 1950s until 1966, when the Security Council was enlarged. This however would be the first time in over five decades that two members agreed to split a term; intractable deadlocks have instead usually been resolved by the candidate countries withdrawing in favour of a third member state.

== Prime Minister of Italy ==
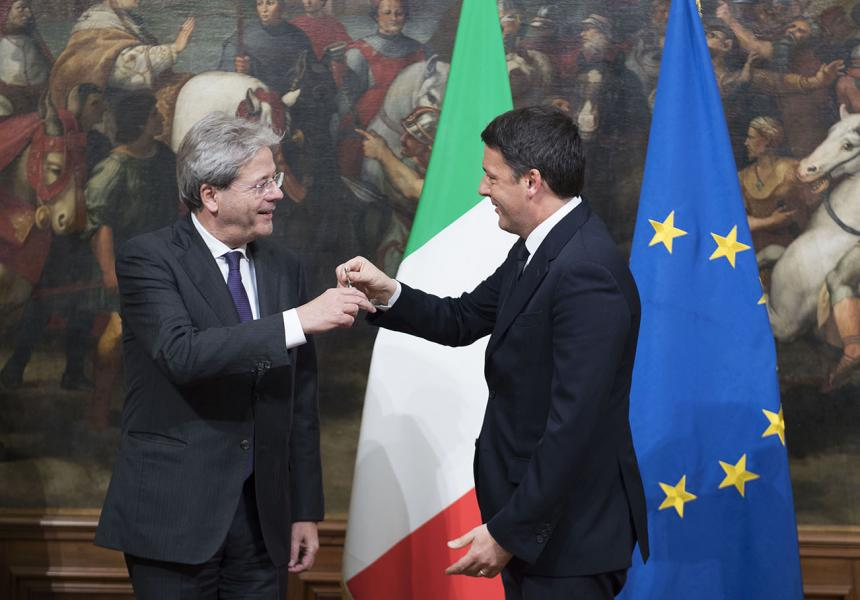
Gentiloni with Matteo Renzi during the swearing-in ceremony.

On 7 December 2016, Prime Minister Matteo Renzi announced his resignation, following the rejection of his proposals to overhaul the Senate in the 2016 Italian constitutional referendum. On 11 December, Gentiloni was asked by President Mattarella to form a new government. On 12 December, Gentiloni was officially sworn in as the new head of the government.

Gentiloni led a coalition government supported by the Democratic Party (PD) and the Christian democratic Popular Area, composed of the New Centre-Right (NCD) and the Centrists for Italy. This was the same majority that had supported Renzi's government for almost three years. Meanwhile, the centrist Liberal Popular Alliance (ALA), led by Denis Verdini, did not support the new cabinet because no member of the ALA was appointed as a minister.

On 13 December, Gentiloni's cabinet won a confidence vote in the Chamber of Deputies, with 368 votes for and 105 against, while the deputies of the Five Star Movement (M5S) and Lega Nord left the chamber. On the following day, the government also won a confidence vote in the Senate, with 169 votes for and 99 against.

On 29 December, deputy ministers of the PD, NCD, the Italian Socialist Party, and Solidary Democracy, were appointed. After the split of Article One from the PD, that party was presented by one deputy minister in the government.

On 19 July 2017, Gentiloni became Minister of Regional Affairs ad interim after the resignation of Enrico Costa, member of Popular Alternative, who often criticized Gentiloni's views and ideas, especially regarding immigration and the jus soli.

On 24 March 2018, following the elections of the presidents of the two houses of the Italian Parliament, Roberto Fico (M5S) and Maria Elisabetta Alberti Casellati (FI), Gentiloni resigned his post to President Mattarella; however, he remained in office until 1 June, when Giuseppe Conte was sworn in as the new prime minister at the head of a populist coalition composed by the M5S and the League.

=== Social policies ===
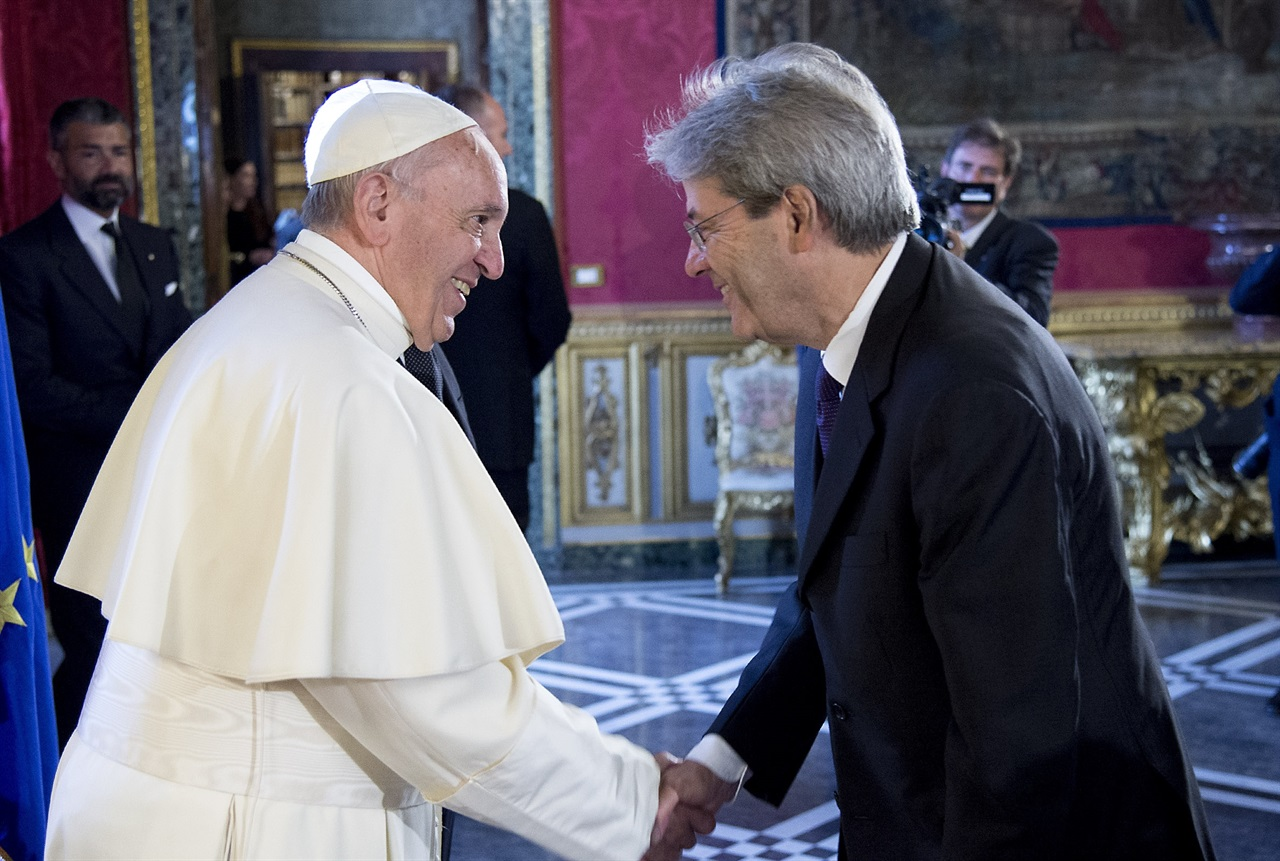
Gentiloni with Pope Francis in June 2017.

On 19 May 2017, the Council of Ministers, on the proposal of Prime Minister Gentiloni and Health Minister Beatrice Lorenzin, approved a decree law containing urgent vaccine prevention measures that reintroduced the mandatory vaccination, bringing the number of mandatory vaccines from 4 to 12 and not allowing those who have not been vaccinated to attend school.

On 14 December 2017, the Parliament officially approved a law concerning the advance healthcare directive, better known as "living will", a legal document in which a person specifies what actions should be taken for their health if they are no longer able to make decisions for themselves because of illness or incapacity. With this law, living will has become legal in Italy. The law also provided the refusal of end-of-life cares. The bill was harshly opposed by many Christian democratic and social conservative politicians of Forza Italia, Lega Nord, Brothers of Italy and even PD's ally Popular Alternative, while it was supported by PD, Five Star Movement, Article One and Italian Left.

The Catholic Church, led by Pope Francis, did not put up major objections to the living will law, saying that a balance needed to be struck with the prevention of excessive treatment or therapeutic obstinacy.

=== Labour policies ===
In March 2017 the government abolished the use of labour vouchers, bonds of the redeemable transaction type which are worth a certain monetary value and which may be spent only for specific reasons or on specific goods, commonly one-off labour services. The government decided to promote this law after a referendum that was called by Italy's main trade union CGIL. Gentiloni stated that he decided to abolish them, because he did not want to split the country in another referendum, after the December 2016 constitutional one.

In March 2018, the unemployment rate was around 11%, lower than the previous years, and the percentage of unemployed young people was the lowest since 2011, at 31.7%. This data were seeing by many as the proof of a robust economic recovery started in 2013, after the euro area crisis that affected Italy in 2011.

=== Immigration ===
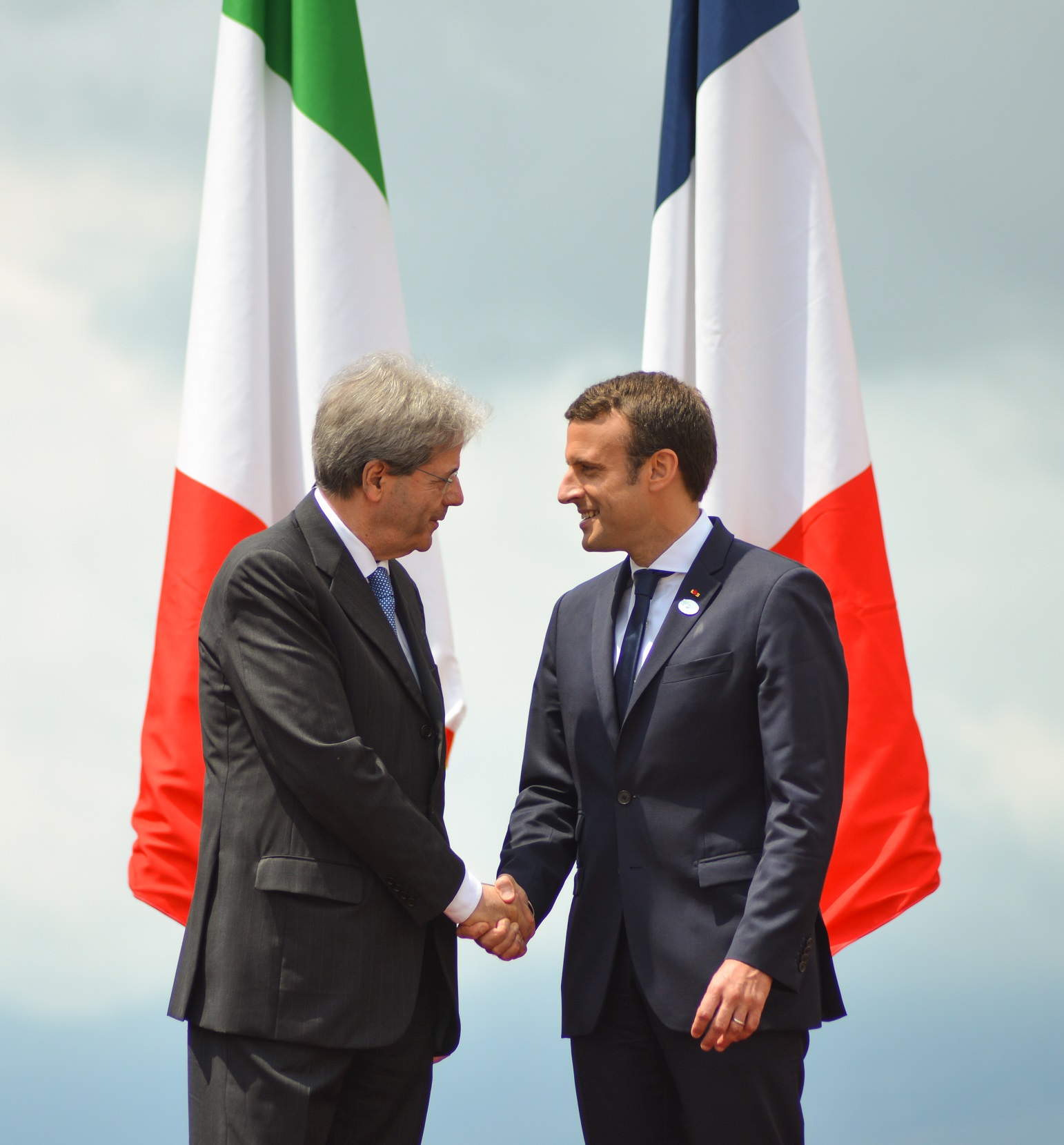
Gentiloni with French President Emmanuel Macron in May 2017.

A major problem faced by Gentiloni upon becoming prime minister in 2016 was the high levels of illegal immigration to Italy. On 2 February 2017, Gentiloni reached a deal in Rome with Libyan Chairman of the Presidential Council Fayez al-Sarraj on halting migration. Libya agreed to try to stop migrants from setting out to cross the Mediterranean Sea. On 9 February, Gentiloni signed a similar deal with President of Tunisia Beji Caid Essebsi, to prevent the migration across the Mediterranean.

During his premiership, Gentiloni and his Interior Minister, Marco Minniti, promoted stricter policies regarding immigration and public security, to reduce the number of immigrants toward Italy and to counteract the populist propaganda promoted by the far-right Northern League. In July 2017 the government promoted the so-called "Minniti Code", which must be subscribed by the NGOs that are involved in rescuing asylum seekers in the Mediterranean.

Among other things, the code forbids NGO vessels from entering Libyan territorial waters. Minniti and Gentiloni warned those NGOs who did not sign the pact that they have set themselves "outside of the organised system for rescue at sea". Some NGOs refused to sign the new code of conduct; Médecins Sans Frontières was the first charity to officially announce its 'no' to the code, saying that there were no conditions under which to sign. Facing growing public discontent and scrutiny by the Italian, Libyan, and EU authorities, MSF had to suspend its activities in the Mediterranean sea. The German NGO, Sea Watch, said that the code was "largely illegal" and "will not save lives but will have the opposite effect".

In December 2017, the Gentiloni announced the peacekeeping mission which consists in the sending of 450 soldiers in Niger, to help the local forces in the fight against migrants' traffickers and Islamic terrorism. The deal was reached along with French president Emmanuel Macron, who stated that French troops, which were already in the area, will cooperate with Italian ones.

=== Electoral law ===
After the rejection of the constitutional reform, the Parliament had to change the electoral law proposed by Renzi's government; in fact the so-called Italicum regulates only the election of the Chamber of Deputies, and not that of the Senate, which, if the reform passed, would be indirectly elected by citizens. The PD proposed a new electoral law called Mattarellum bis, better known as Rosatellum, from the name of his main proponent Ettore Rosato, Democratic leader in the Chamber of Deputies. This electoral law was similar to the one which was applied in Italy from 1993 to 2005.

The Rosatellum used an additional member system, which act as a mixed system, with 37% of seats allocated using a first past the post electoral system, 61% using a proportional method, with one round of voting and 2% elected in the overseas constituencies. The Senate and the Chamber of Deputies did not differ in the way they allocated the proportional seats, both using the D'Hondt method of allocating seats. The new electoral law was supported by PD and his government ally Popular Alternative, but also by the opposition parties Forza Italia and Lega Nord.

Despite many protests from the Five Star Movement and Article One, which accused Renzi and Gentiloni to have used the confidence vote in order to approve the law, on 12 October the electoral law was approved by the Chamber of Deputies with 375 votes in favor and 215 against.

=== Foreign policy ===
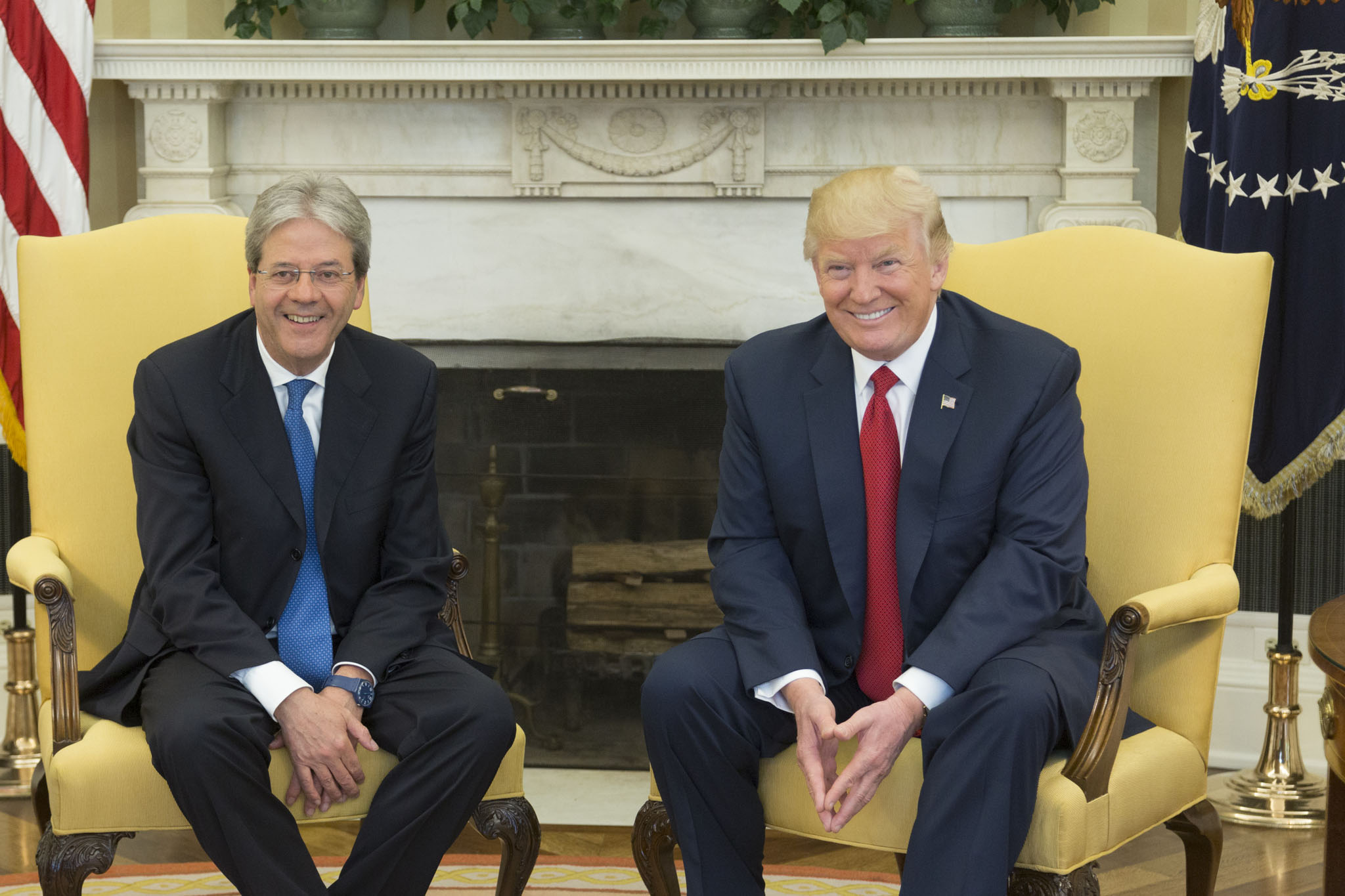
Paolo Gentiloni with U.S. President Donald Trump in April 2017

Paolo Gentiloni strongly supports European integration and a multi-speed Europe. During his premiership, Gentiloni faced several challenging foreign policy situations, such as the European debt crisis, the civil war in Libya, the insurgency of the Islamic State (IS) in the Middle East. Gentiloni set up good relations with Canadian Prime Minister Justin Trudeau, UK Prime Minister Theresa May, German Chancellor Angela Merkel and French President Emmanuel Macron.

In April 2017, he was invited to the White House by President Trump, where the two leaders discussed the serious crisis caused by the civil wars in Libya and Syria, the tensions with Vladimir Putin's Russia and their key partnership against the Islamic terrorism.

As prime minister, he hosted the 43rd G7 summit in Taormina, Sicily. This summit was the first one for him and also for U.S. president Donald Trump, Prime Minister May, and President Macron. It was the first time since 1987 that the G7 summit in Italy was not hosted by Silvio Berlusconi.

While in office, Gentiloni built up a series of close relations with the Arab countries of the Persian Gulf, based especially on commercial agreements regarding oil and offshore producing concessions. Gentiloni visited the Arab peninsula three times thought his premiership. On 1 May 2017, he went to Kuwait, where he had bilateral meetings with the Emir Sabah al-Ahmad and the crown prince Nawaf Al-Ahmad; later the premier visited the Italian soldiers stationed in Kuwait as part of the anti-ISIL coalition. On 31 October 2017, the prime minister met in Riyadh, King Salman bin Abdulaziz Al Saud and the crown prince Mohammed bin Salman. Gentiloni, later visited Qatar, where he met with the Emir Tamim bin Hamad Al Thani and visited the National Library of Qatar with Emir's consort, Moza bint Nasser. Gentiloni visited the United Arab Emirates twice; the first one in November 2017 and the second one in March 2018, when he met in Abu Dhabi the crown prince Mohammed bin Zayed Al Nahyan. During his visit he participated in the signing ceremony of a commercial agreement between Eni and Abu Dhabi National Oil Company.

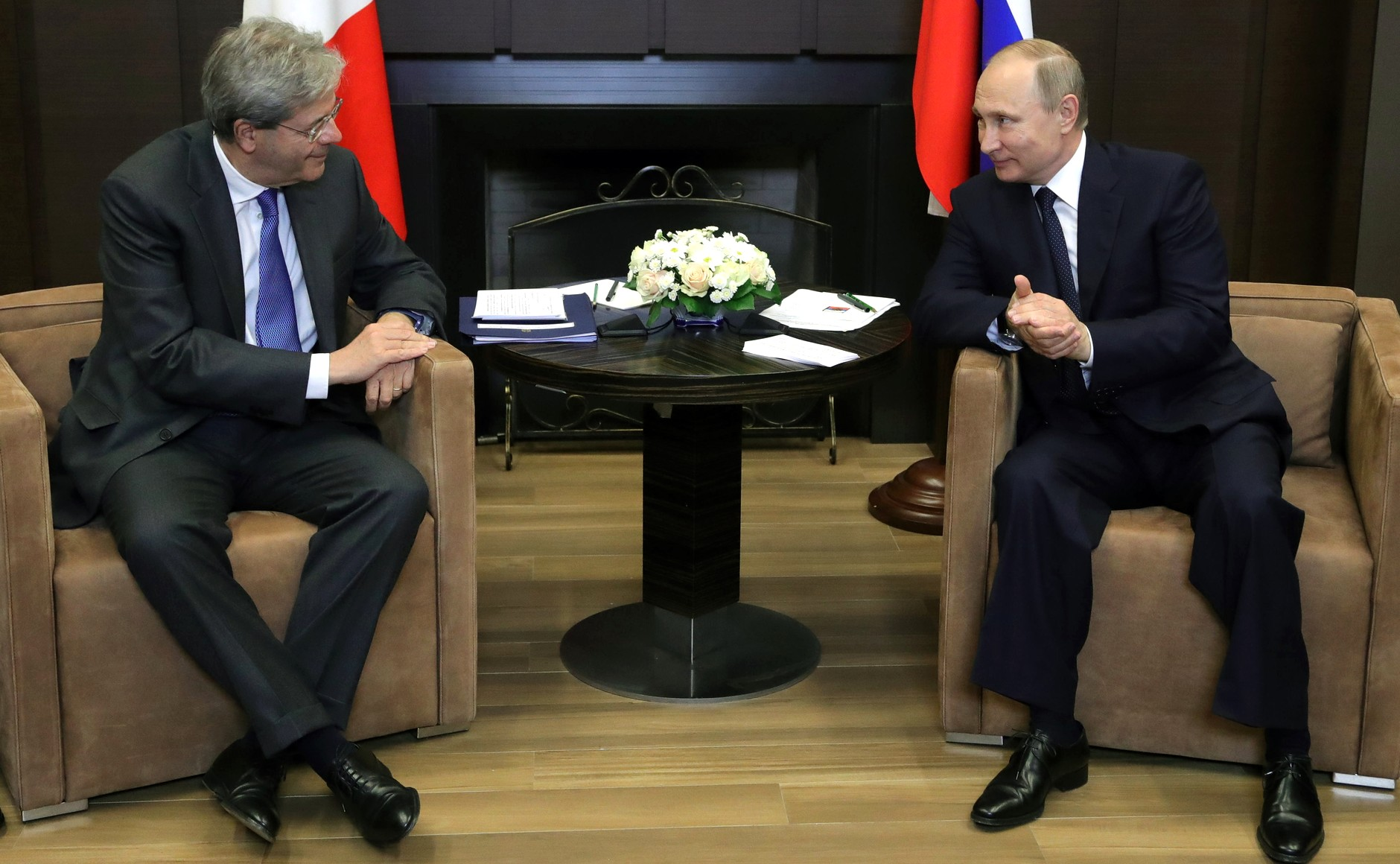
Gentiloni with Russian President Vladimir Putin in May 2017

In May 2017, he had an official trip to China to meet CCP General Secretary Xi Jinping and Chinese Premier Li Keqiang, to discuss about the One Belt One Road Initiative, a development strategy proposed by the Chinese government that focuses on connectivity and cooperation between Eurasian countries. Gentiloni stated that "Italy can be a key protagonist in this great operation: it is a great opportunity for us and my presence here means how much we consider it important."

On 16 and 17 May, Paolo Gentiloni went to Sochi, where he met Russian president Vladimir Putin. The two leaders stressed their hope for a re-opening of a dialogue between Russia and NATO. They also signed six economic deals between the Italian Eni and the Russian Rosneft.

On 20 September, Prime Minister Gentiloni spoke at the United Nations General Assembly during the UN annual summit in New York City. Gentiloni focused his speech on the problem of climatic change, the facing of the migrant crisis and the fight against Islamic terrorism.

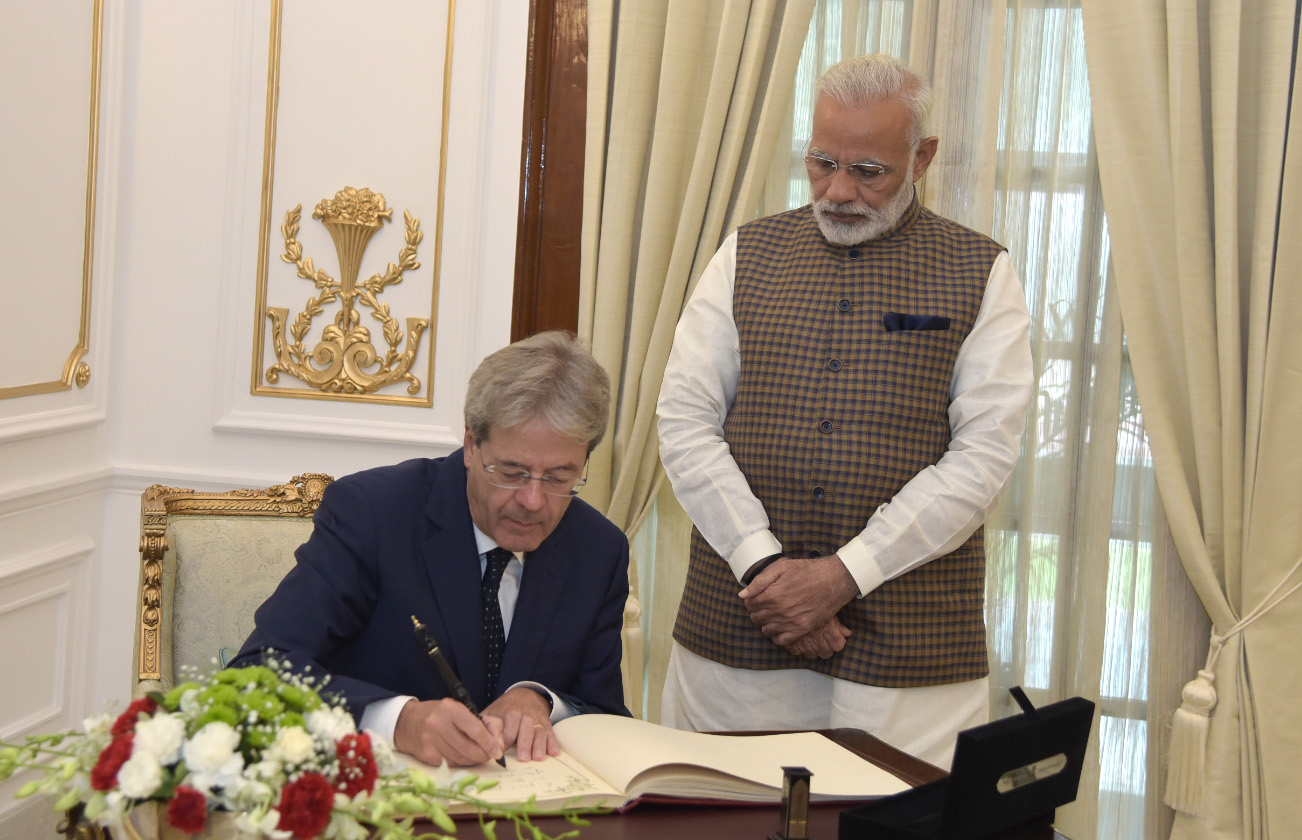
Gentiloni with Indian Prime Minister, Narendra Modi, in October 2017

On 29 and 30 October, Gentiloni went to India, where he met Prime Minister Narendra Modi. After some years of tensions due to the 2012 Enrica Lexie case, in which two Italian marines were arrested for killing two fishermen in Kerala, the two countries revived normal relations. The two leaders signed some economic treaties and discussed the recognition of the Hare Krishnas, who still are not recognized in Italy as a religious minority. Gentiloni was the first Italian leader to visit India since Romano Prodi in 2007; Gentiloni and Modi described the visit as a "new beginning" and a great opportunity for both countries.

During his term as foreign affairs minister and especially during his premiership, Gentiloni started a policy review which led to the creation of the Italy–Africa initiative, which includes renewable energy cooperation and a new package of development aid in fields stretching from health care to culture; counterterrorism has been a key part of his agenda, but the West Africa region is also important to stop the migration flows from there to Italy through North Africa, especially Libya. In November 2017 he started one of the most important foreign mission of his tenure. On 24 November, Gentiloni visited Tunisia, where he met President Beji Caid Essebsi and Prime Minister Youssef Chahed, with whom he discussed the migrant crisis, the fight against terrorism and the Libyan Civil War. He also had a meeting with the Italian community in Tunis. On 26 November he moved to Angola, where he had a bilateral meeting with President João Lourenço; the two leaders signed many economic deals between Eni and the Angolan Sonangol Group. On the following days Gentiloni went to Ghana to meet President Nana Akufo-Addo and visit Eni's plant named "John Agyekum Kufuor". On 28 November he moved to Ivory Coast to participate at the EU–African Union summit.

=== 2018 general election ===
On 28 December 2017, after meeting with Gentiloni, President Sergio Mattarella dissolved the Parliament and called new elections for 4 March 2018. Gentiloni remained in office during this period as a caretaker Prime Minister. During the 2018 Italian general election campaign, many prominent members of the Democratic Party, including Romano Prodi, Walter Veltroni, and Carlo Calenda, publicly asked Matteo Renzi to renounce his candidacy for Prime Minister and promote Gentiloni as the party's candidate. Gentiloni refused to endorse the view of his colleagues, and Renzi remained within the party leadership .

The election resulted in the centre-right alliance, led by Matteo Salvini's League, winning a plurality of seats in the Chamber of Deputies and in the Senate, while the anti-establishment Five Star Movement, led by Luigi Di Maio, became the party with the largest individual number of votes; the centre-left coalition, led by Renzi and the Democratic Party, finished third. After negotiations lasting several months, the League and the Five Star Movement agreed a programme for a coalition government led by the independent Giuseppe Conte; Gentiloni resigned as prime minister on 1 June 2018.

Gentiloni chose not to contest the leadership of the Democratic Party, instead remaining on the backbench within the Chamber of Deputies, where he frequently attacked the policies of Matteo Salvini as Interior Minister, particularly on immigration, Romani people and gun laws. On 28 June 2018, during an interview with Lilli Gruber's Otto e mezzo, Gentiloni announced his intention to play a role in the formation of a broad centre-left coalition, which was seen by many as an intention to become the candidate for prime minister of the centre-left at the next election. Nothing came of these plans; in October 2018, Gentiloni endorsed Nicola Zingaretti in the election for the new PD Secretary. After Zingaretti won the election in March 2019, he appointed Gentiloni as the president of the Democratic Party.

== European Commissioner for Economy ==
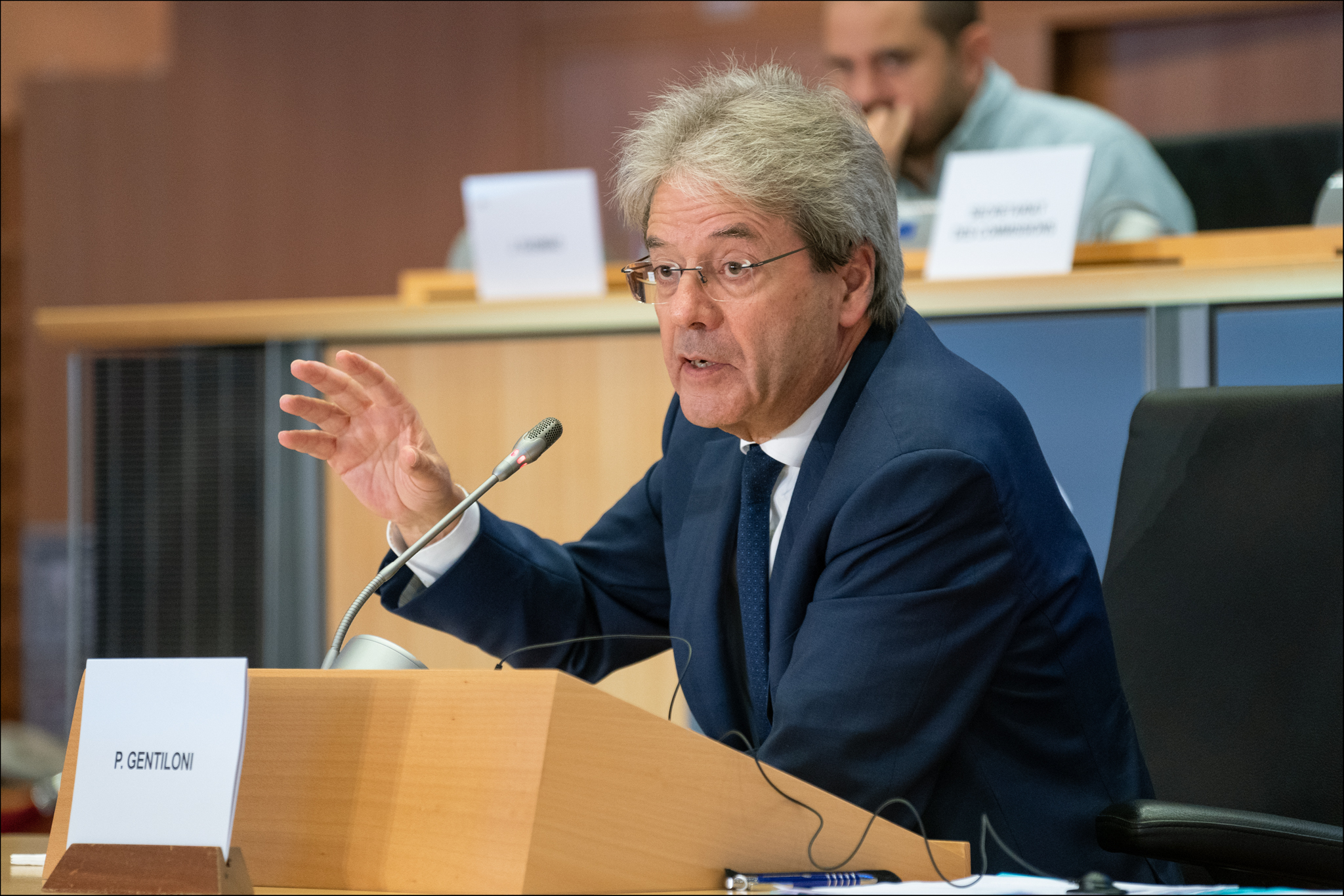
Gentiloni before the European Parliament as candidate for Commissioner for Economy.

In August 2019, tensions between the League and Five Star Movement (5SM) became public, leading to a motion of no-confidence in Giuseppe Conte as prime minister. Conte initially offered his resignation, but in a surprise move, Gentiloni led the national executive of the Democratic Party in announcing it would be open to the possibility of forming a new coalition with the M5S, based on pro-Europeanism, green economy, sustainable development, the fight against economic inequality and a new immigration policy, and while keeping Conte as prime minister. On 29 August 2019, President Sergio Mattarella invited Conte to form a new coalition government between 5SM and the PD, with several PD politicians entering the Cabinet. On 5 September 2019, the new Cabinet was sworn in; later that afternoon, following the first meeting of the new Cabinet, Conte announced that the Government had decided to nominate Gentiloni as the new Italian European Commissioner within the Von der Leyen Commission.

On 10 September, Ursula von der Leyen announced that she would hand Gentiloni the role of Commissioner for Economy if he was successfully approved by the European Parliament. On 3 October, the Committee on Economic and Monetary Affairs approved Gentiloni's nomination for the role. On 30 November, Gentiloni announced his retirement from the Chamber of Deputies, after almost 19 years of service. The resignation became effective on 2 December. During his final speech to the Chamber, he said: "I make a solemn commitment to hold together the national and European interests. I am an Italian man in love with Italy, I am a patriot, and I will try to make it clear that the best way to protect the national interest is to do so in the European dimension." On 1 December 2019, he formally began his new role within the European Commission.

In early March 2020, Gentiloni was appointed by President von der Leyen to serve on the Commission's special task force to coordinate their response to the COVID-19 pandemic, which severely affected the European Union. The task force's plan consisted in the Next Generation EU program, an economic recovery package to support member states adversely impacted by the COVID-19 pandemic. Agreed to by the European Council on 21 July 2020, the fund is worth €750 billion. The NGEU fund will operate from 2021 to 2023, and will be tied to the regular 2021–2027 budget of the EU's Multiannual Financial Framework (MFF). The comprehensive NGEU and MFF packages are projected to reach €1824.3 billion.

== Later career ==
In late 2024, United Nations Secretary-General António Guterres appointed Gentiloni to a group of experts to promote actionable policy solutions and galvanize political and public support required to resolve the developing world's debt crisis, chaired by Mahmoud Mohieldin.

== Political views and public image ==
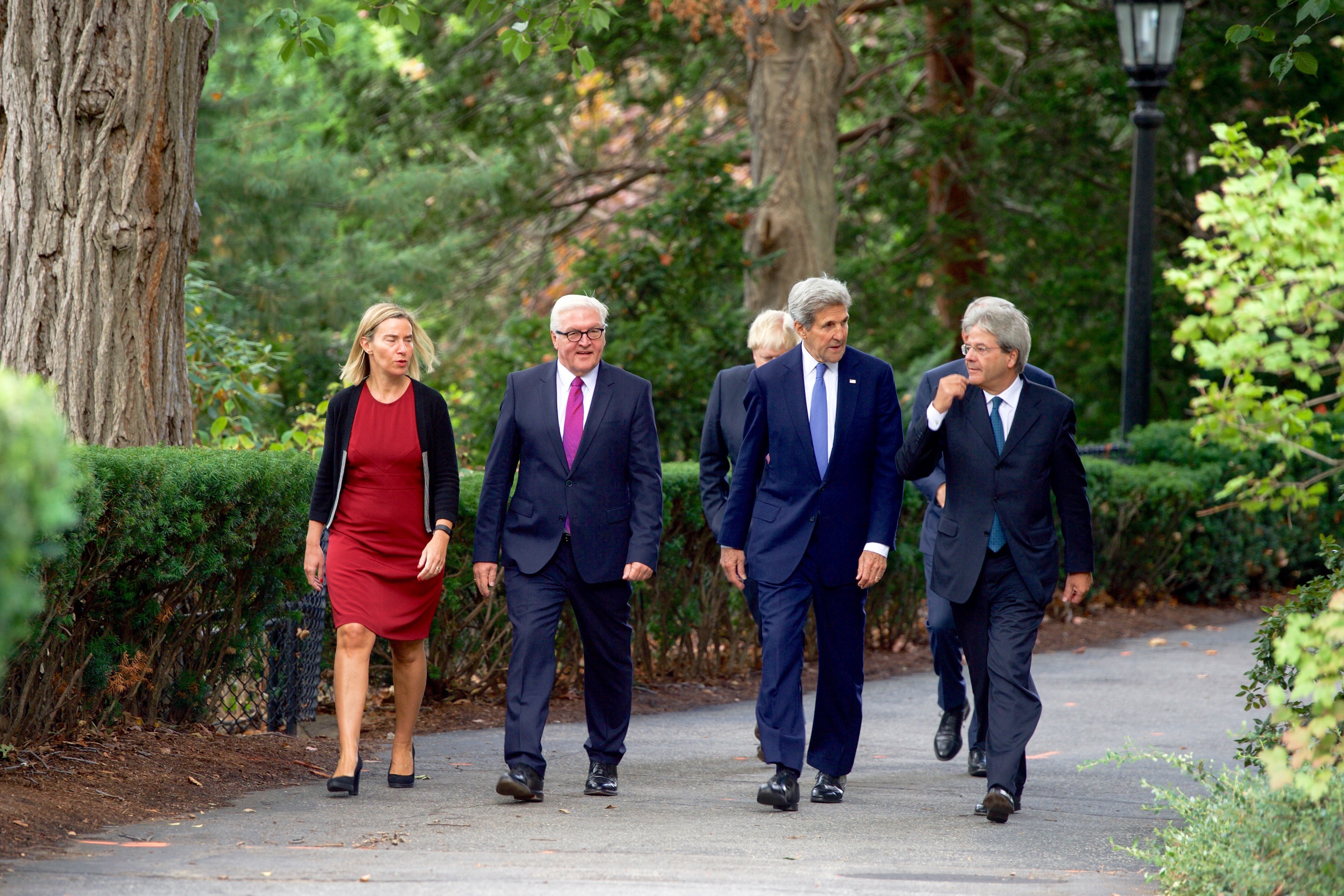
Paolo Gentiloni with the other G7 foreign ministers in Massachusetts, 2016.

Paolo Gentiloni is widely considered a Christian leftist and progressive politician. Despite having started his political career within the extra-parliamentary far-left movements, Gentiloni later assumed more Christian democratic and social liberal views. Gentiloni is in favour of the recognition of civil unions for same-sex couples and stepchild adoptions, a situation which occurs when at least one parent has children, from a previous relationship, that are not genetically related to the other parent. He also supports the advance healthcare directive.

While traditionally supporting the social integration of immigrants, since 2017 Paolo Gentiloni has adopted a more critical approach on the issue. Inspired by Marco Minniti, his Interior Minister, the government promoted stricter policies regarding immigration and public security. These policies resulted in broad criticism from the left-wing Article One, PD's partners in the cabinet which later left the government's majority, as well as left-leaning intellectuals like Roberto Saviano and Gad Lerner. In August Lerner, who was among the founding members of the Democratic Party, left the party altogether, due to the government's new immigration policies.

Gentiloni is considered by many journalists, politicians and commentators a skilled political mediator and well-wisher of a collective leadership, based on consociationalism and power-sharing, very different from the overflowing political style of his predecessor and former party mate, Matteo Renzi. Due to his nature and political views, Gentiloni was sometimes compared to Romano Prodi, former prime minister and founder of the centre-left coalition.

According to public opinion surveys in December 2017, after one year of government, Gentiloni's approval rating was 44%, the second highest rating after that of President Sergio Mattarella, and far higher than the other prominent politicians; moreover his approval rating has increased since he came into office. After the 2018 general election, Gentiloni's approval rating rose to 52%, higher than every other political leader and followed by League's leader Matteo Salvini.

== Health ==
On 10 January 2017, after an official trip in Paris to meet President François Hollande, Gentiloni suffered an obstructed coronary artery and received an emergency angioplasty. On the following day Gentiloni tweeted that he felt well and would be back at work soon. On the same day he also received well wishes from President Sergio Mattarella, former prime ministers Matteo Renzi and Silvio Berlusconi, and Canadian prime minister Justin Trudeau.

== Electoral history ==
| Election | House | Constituency | Party | Votes | Result |
|---|---|---|---|---|---|
| 2001 | Chamber of Deputies | Piedmont 2 | DL | – (Note: Elected in a closed list proportional representation system.) | Elected |
| 2006 | Chamber of Deputies | Lazio 1 | Ulivo | – | Elected |
| 2008 | Chamber of Deputies | Lazio 1 | PD | – | Elected |
| 2013 | Chamber of Deputies | Lazio 1 | PD | – | Elected |
| 2018 | Chamber of Deputies | Rome–Trionfale | PD | 47,737 | Elected |

=== First-past-the-post elections ===
2018 general election (C): Rome — Trionfale
| Candidate | Party | Votes | % |
|---|---|---|---|
| Paolo Gentiloni | Centre-left coalition | 47,737 | 42.1 |
| Luciano Ciocchetti | Centre-right coalition | 35,014 | 30.9 |
| Angiolino Cirulli | Five Star Movement | 19,987 | 16.7 |
| Others | | 11,741 | 10.3 |
| Total | | 113,479 | 100.0 |

Political offices
| Preceded by Mario Landolfi | Minister of Communications; 2006–2008 | Succeeded by Claudio Scajola as Minister of Economic Development |
| Preceded by Federica Mogherini | Minister of Foreign Affairs; 2014–2016 | Succeeded by Angelino Alfano |
| Preceded by Matteo Renzi | Prime Minister of Italy; 2016–2018 | Succeeded by Giuseppe Conte |
| Preceded by Federica Mogherini | Italian European Commissioner; 2019–2024 | Succeeded by Raffaele Fitto |
| Preceded by Pierre Moscovici | European Commissioner for Economic and Monetary Affairs; 2019–2024 | Succeeded by Valdis Dombrovskis |
Party political offices
| Preceded by Matteo Orfini | President of the Democratic Party; 2019–2020 | Succeeded by Valentina Cuppi |
Diplomatic posts
| Preceded by Shinzō Abe | Chair of the Group of Seven; 2017 | Succeeded by Justin Trudeau |
