= List of Alleanza Nazionale politicians =

A list of notable politicians of the Alleanza Nazionale party, Italy:

== A ==
- Gianni Alemanno
- Giuseppe Angeli
- Roberta Angelilli

== B ==
- Mario Baldassarri
- Sergio Berlato
- Italo Bocchino
- Giulia Bongiorno

== C ==
- Antonio Cicchetti

== D ==
- Elena Donazzan

== F ==
- Gianfranco Fini
- Publio Fiori
- Domenico Fisichella
- Alessandro Foglietta

== G ==
- Maurizio Gasparri
- Alberto Giorgetti

== L ==
- Ignazio La Russa
- Mario Landolfi

== M ==
- Alfredo Mantica
- Altero Matteoli
- Giorgia Meloni
- Roberto Menia
- Cristiana Muscardini
- Alessandra Mussolini

== P ==
- Giovanni Pace
- Nicola Pasetto
- Oreste Perri
- Umberto Pirilli
- Adriana Poli Bortone

== R ==
- Antonio Rastrelli
- Andrea Ronchi

== S ==
- Daniela Santanchè
- Giuseppe Scopelliti
- Edgardo Sogno

== T ==
- Giuseppe Tatarella
- Salvatore Tatarella
- Mirko Tremaglia
