= Foundation of Freedom =

Italian think tank

Foundation of Freedom (Fondazione della Libertà) was a liberal-conservative think tank connected to The People of Freedom, a political party in Italy.

Founded in 2010 by Altero Matteoli, it can be seen as a continuation of New Alliance, a major faction within National Alliance (merged into PdL in 2009), through the PdL. However, while New Alliance represented the wing of National Alliance closer to the leader Gianfranco Fini, Matteoli and his group distanced from Fini, after that he started to criticize Silvio Berlusconi, and are now much more closer to the latter.

Foundation of Freedom is thus a keen supporter of Berlusconi's leadership and opposes the moves of Generation Italy, the minority faction around Fini. In this respect the faction collaborates with the two other main groups coming from National Alliance which are loyal to Berlusconi, Protagonist Italy (leaders: Maurizio Gasparri, Ignazio La Russa) and New Italy (leader: Gianni Alemanno), along with some minor groups (Christian Reformists, Movement for Italy, etc.).

Other than Matteoli (president), leading members of the faction are Eugenio Minasso (vice president), Andrea Fluttero (secretary-general), Marcello De Angelis (scientific director), Giovan Battista Papello (organizational director) and Marco Martinelli.
