= List of Italian Social Movement politicians =

A list of notable Italian Social Movement politicians:

== A ==
- Gianni Alemanno
- Giorgio Almirante
- Filippo Anfuso

== B ==
- Gino Birindelli
- Junio Valerio Borghese
- Teodoro Buontempo

== C ==
- Antonio Cicchetti
- Alfredo Covelli

== D ==
- Augusto De Marsanich
- Renzo de' Vidovich

== F ==
- Lando Ferretti
- Gianfranco Fini
- Domenico Fisichella
- Alessandro Foglietta

== G ==
- Maurizio Gasparri
- Ezio Maria Gray
- Rodolfo Graziani
- Almerigo Grilz

== L ==
- Ignazio La Russa
- Domenico Leccisi

== M ==
- Altero Matteoli
- Roberto Menia
- Domenico Mennitti
- Vito Miceli
- Arturo Michelini
- Massimo Morsello
- Cristiana Muscardini
- Alessandra Mussolini
- Nello Musumeci

== P ==
- Biagio Pace
- Nicola Pasetto
- Giorgio Pini
- Umberto Pirilli
- Adriana Poli Bortone

== R ==
- Pino Rauti
- Giovanni Roberti
- Pino Romualdi

== S ==
- Giuseppe Scopelliti
- Tomaso Staiti di Cuddia delle Chiuse
- Francesco Storace

== T ==
- Giuseppe Tatarella
- Salvatore Tatarella
- Mirko Tremaglia
