= New Italy (foundation) =

Italian think tank

New Italy Foundation (Fondazione Nuova Italia) is a national and socially-conservative think tank in Italy.

Its president is Gianni Alemanno, a neofascist politician who served as minister of Agriculture in 2001 to 2006 and mayor of Rome in 2008 to 2013.

Formed in 2006 within the National Alliance (AN), the successor party of the Italian Social Movement (MSI), New Italy was affiliated to The People of Freedom (PdL), a broad centre-right party led by Silvio Berlusconi, from its foundation in 2009 to 2013, when Alemanno left the party to launch Italy First.

== History ==
Within AN, Alemanno was one of the two main leaders of Social Right, along with Francesco Storace, since the late 1990s. They represented the party's nostalgic right-wing and had left-wing populist instincts on the economy. In 2007 Alemanno divorced from Storace because of the latter's opposition of Gianfranco Fini's leadership, the party's application to become a member of the European People's Party and its proposed merged with Forza Italia to form the PdL. While Storace chose to leave the party to form The Right to the right of AN, Alemanno threw his weight behind Fini and launched New Italy as a cultural association instead.

Since its foundation, the cornerstones of New Italy had been those of the defunct Social Right: a strong Italian patriotism (with a clear reference to the tradition of the MSI), disillusionment with globalization, support for social market economy, a "social" view of welfare, and pacifism. Despite his post-fascist past, Alemanno tended to be a moderate figure within the PdL, thanks to his converging views with the party's Christian democrats on moral and social issues.

Within the PdL, New Italy organised the New Italy Clubs, which were the "political arm" of the association. In 2010 they staunchly supported the leadership of Silvio Berlusconi and opposed the moves of Generation Italy, the minority faction around Gianfranco Fini. In this respect, Alemanno's followers co-operated with the two other main groups hailing from AN, Protagonist Italy (leaders: Maurizio Gasparri, Ignazio La Russa) and Foundation of Freedom (leader: Altero Matteoli), and other minor groups formed mainly by former AN members (Christian Reformists, Movement for Italy, etc.). Only a few former Social Rightists eventually joined Fini's Future and Freedom.

In 2011 Alemanno became more critical of Berlusconi. In September New Italy organized a three-day convention during which Alemanno outlined its plan for Italy and the PdL. At the top of his agenda, there were the introduction of primaries at all levels in the PdL and the reduction of Lega Nord's role within the coalition.

In 2012, while still being part of the PdL, the faction presented its own lists in a few municipalities in Southern Italy, gaining a notable 14.2% in Fasano, Apulia.

In October 2013 Alemanno, who was defeated in his mayoral re-election bid, left the PdL. A few days later, he launched a new political party called Italy First. In doing this, he was actively supported by New Italy, which contributed to the draft of the party's founding manifesto.
