= Lists of Italian politicians =

The following are lists of Italian politicians.

- List of Alleanza Nazionale politicians
- List of Italian Communist Party politicians
- List of Italian Communist Refoundation Party politicians
- List of Partito d'Azione politicians
- List of Democrats of the Left politicians
- List of Democratic Party of Italy politicians
- List of Italian Christian Democracy politicians
- List of Lega Nord politicians
- List of Italian Liberal Party politicians
- List of Italian Social Movement politicians
- List of Democracy is Freedom – The Daisy politicians
- List of Italian religious minority politicians

== See also ==
- List of people from Italy
