= Protagonist Italy =

Protagonist Italy (Italia Protagonista) is a national conservative foundation and think tank connected to Forza Italia (formerly PdL), a political party in Italy.

Founded in 2009 by Maurizio Gasparri, it can be seen as a continuation of Protagonist Right, a major faction within National Alliance (merged into PdL in 2009), through the PdL. In June 2010 the group was joined by Ignazio La Russa, who was the leader of Protagonist Right along with Gasparri.

Protagonist Italy is a keen supporter of the leadership of Silvio Berlusconi and opposes the moves of Generation Italy, the minority faction around Gianfranco Fini. In this respect the faction collaborates with the two other main groups coming from National Alliance which are loyal to Berlusconi, New Italy (leader: Gianni Alemanno) and Foundation of Freedom (leader: Altero Matteoli), along with some minor groups (Christian Reformists, Movement for Italy, etc.).
