= New Alliance (Italy) =

Italian political party faction

New Alliance (Nuova Alleanza) was a liberal-conservative faction within National Alliance, a political party in Italy.

The faction was founded in December 2001 by Altero Matteoli, Cristiana Muscardini, Adolfo Urso and Domenico Nania, who were at the time the staunchest supporters of the leadership of Gianfranco Fini. New Alliance, which was the result of the merger of Right and Freedom (Matteoli, Urso) with Plural Right (Nania), was an early supporter of the party's entry into the European People's Party and represented the most vocal wing of the party in favour of economic liberalism.

In the 2002 party congress New Alliance was represented by the 25-30% of delegates.

Within The People of Freedom, the broad centre-right party into which National Alliance was merged in 2009, Matteoli launched Foundation of Freedom, distancing from Fini, while Urso became one of the most staunchest supporters of Fini's Generation Italy and the secretary-general of FareFuturo. When Fini and his followers (including Urso, at the time) left the party in order to launch Future and Freedom, most former members of New Alliance remained in The People of Freedom.
