= Sadda Haq =

Sadda Haq (lit. ' Our Right') may refer to:

- Sadda Haq (song), a song by A. R. Rahman from the 2011 Indian film Rockstar
- Sadda Haq (film), a 2013 Indian punjabi film by Mandeep Benipal
- Sadda Haq (TV series), a 2013 Indian television series

== See also ==
- Our Right
- My Life (disambiguation)
- My Choice (disambiguation)
