= Our Right =

Our Right (La Nostra Destra) was a short-lived national-conservative faction within The People of Freedom (PdL), a political party in Italy.

Founded on 3 May 2010 by Ignazio La Russa on the ashes of Protagonist Right, a major faction within National Alliance (merged into PdL in 2009), Our Right was active primarily in Lombardy, where La Russa and his brother Romano had their power base, despite hailing from Sicily. The faction was launched as a response to Generation Italy, the minority faction around Gianfranco Fini which opposed Silvio Berlusconi and eventually left the party in order to launch Future and Freedom.

Soon after the establishment of the faction, La Russa joined forces with his long-time faction-mate Maurizio Gasparri within Protagonist Italy.
