= Anna Maria Bernini =

Italian politician and lawyer (born 1965)

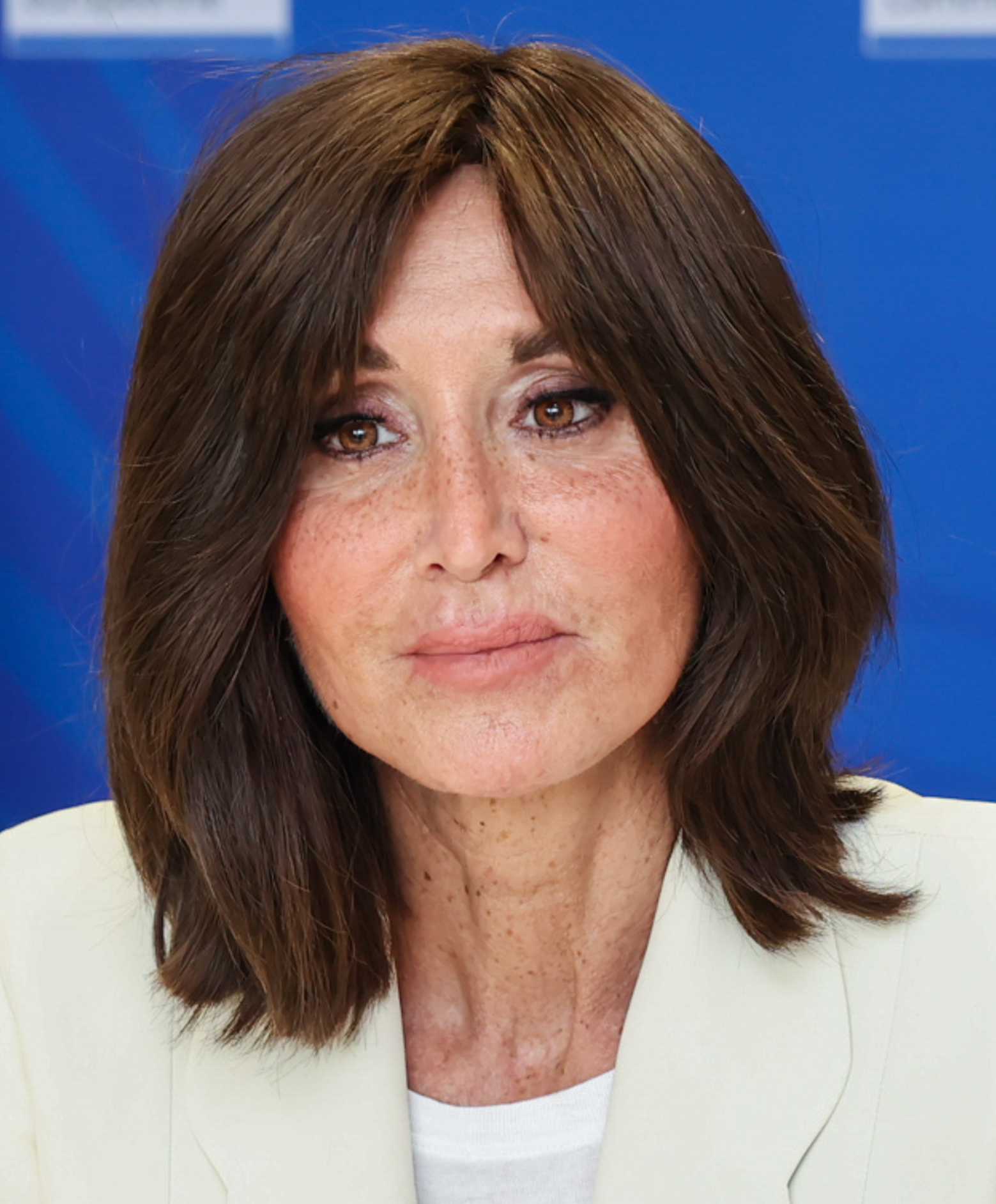
- Bernini in 2024

Minister of University and Research
- Incumbent
- Assumed office 22 October 2022
- Prime Minister: Giorgia Meloni
- Preceded by: Maria Cristina Messa

Member of the Senate
- Incumbent
- Assumed office 14 March 2013
- Constituency: Emilia-Romagna (2013-2022); Padua (since 2022)

Minister of European Affairs
- In office 27 July 2011 – 16 November 2011
- Prime Minister: Silvio Berlusconi
- Preceded by: Andrea Ronchi
- Succeeded by: Enzo Moavero Milanesi

Member of the Chamber of Deputies
- In office 29 April 2008 – 14 March 2013
- Constituency: Emilia-Romagna

Personal details
- Born: 17 August 1965 (age 61) Bologna, Italy
- Party: FI (since 2013)
- Other political affiliations: AN (2007–2009); PdL (2009–2013)
- Spouse: Luciano Bovicelli (m. 2003; died 2011)
- Parent: Giorgio Bernini (father)
- Education: University of Bologna
- Profession: Politician, lawyer, university professor

Anna Maria Bernini (born 17 August 1965) is an Italian politician, lawyer, and university professor. She has been elected to the Italian Chamber of Deputies and Senate of the Republic, and has served as Minister of European Affairs. She is currently Minister of University and Research.

== Biography ==
Bernini is a civil and administrative lawyer and associate professor of Compared Public Law at the University of Bologna, where she later taught also Institutions of Public Law, and Law of International and Internal Arbitration and of the alternative procedures. She completed her legal training by participating in several study abroad programs at the University of Michigan, the International Chamber of Commerce (ICC) in Paris, the London Court of International Arbitration (LCIA), Queen Mary College, the Chartered Institute of Arbitrators of London, the Institut du Droit et des Pratiques des Affaires Internationales de la Chambre de Commerce Internationale and the American Arbitration Association (AAA).

=== Political career ===
In 2007, Bernini was one of the promoters of the FareFuturo association founded by Gianfranco Fini. She also joined Fini's National Alliance party.

She was elected to the Chamber of Deputies in the 2008 Italian general election with The People of Freedom. In 2010 she was candidate in the Emilia-Romagna regional election, losing against Vasco Errani. On 27 July 2011 she was appointed Minister of European Affairs, following the resignation of Andrea Ronchi.

In the 2013 Italian general election she was elected to the Senate of the Republic. She is later re-elected at the 2018 general election and proposed by the Northern League as a possible candidate for the role of President of the Senate, but she refused, choosing to endorse her party colleague Maria Elisabetta Alberti Casellati.

On 27 March 2018, Bernini is elected group leader of Forza Italia at the Senate.

=== Political positions ===
Dissenting from the majority of her party, Bernini is fully favourable to the recognition of same-sex unions in Italy and to the stepchild adoption.

=== Family ===
Anna Maria Bernini was the daughter of Giorgio Bernini (1928–2020), who was a lawyer for the United Nations and Forza Italia politician, minister of foreign trade in Berlusconi's first cabinet.

She was married to Luciano Bovicelli, 30 years her senior, a noted gynecologist, who died in 2011.

== Electoral history ==
Election	House/Office	Constituency	Party	Votes	Result
2008	Chamber of Deputies	Emilia-Romagna	PdL	– (Note: Elected in a closed list proportional representation system.)	Elected
2010	President of Emilia-Romagna	Emilia-Romagna	PdL	844,915	Defeated
2013	Senate of the Republic	Emilia-Romagna	PdL	–	Elected
2018	Senate of the Republic	Emilia-Romagna	FI	–	Elected
2022	Senate of the Republic	Padua	FI	272,010	Elected
