= Protagonist Right =

Italian political faction

Protagonist Right (Destra Protagonista) was a national conservative faction within National Alliance, a political party in Italy.

The faction was founded in July 1999 by the followers of Giuseppe Tatarella, one of the party's charismatic leader who had died in February of that year. The faction was very close to Silvio Berlusconi, leader of Forza Italia and the People of Freedom/House of Freedoms coalition, and it was somewhat critical to Gianfranco Fini, leader of National Alliance, instead. Its main members included Ignazio La Russa, Maurizio Gasparri, Mario Landolfi, Salvatore Tatarella and Italo Bocchino.

Protagonist Right was the party's largest faction and in the 2002 congress had more than 40% of the delegates.

Since National Alliance's merger into The People of Freedom, most members of the faction conclusively distanced from Fini and became some of the staunchest supporters of Berlusconi. Only a minority, led by Bocchino and Tatarella, joined Generation Italy and finally followed Fini out of the party into Future and Freedom. Within The People of Freedom, Gasparri launched Protagonist Italy as a successor of the old faction, while La Russa started to strengthen its power base especially in the North through Our Right. In 2012 La Russa left The People of Freedom to form Brothers of Italy, a right-wing ally of The People of Freedom from the outside.
