= New Italy =

New Italy may refer to:

- New Italy, an Italian foundation chaired by Gianni Alemanno
- New Italy, New South Wales, a locality in Australia
