= Independence (Italian political party) =

Independence Indipendenza
- Secretary: Gianni Alemanno
- President: Massimo Arlechino
- Founded: November 26, 2023
- Dissolved: March 31, 2026
- Split from: Brothers of Italy
- Merged into: National Future
- Ideology: Ultraconservatism; Euroscepticism; Right-wing populism Nationalism
- Political position: Far-right
- Colors: Blue

Website
- movimentoindipendenza.it

Independence (Italian: Indipendenza) was a political party in Italy founded on 26 November 2023.

== History ==
After the start of the Russian invasion of Ukraine, Gianni Alemanno, former mayor of Rome, spoke out for a stop to sending arms to Ukraine and for negotiations with Russia, accusing NATO of provoking Russia during the past years. On 27 May 2022, he was among the organisers of the conference 'Stop the war' (Italian: Fermare la Guerra). In August 2022, he refused to stand as a candidate in Brothers of Italy, his former party, accusing centre-right leaders of having different positions from his on the Ukrainian conflict. In September he was appointed spokesman for the 'Stop the War' committee, born out of the conference organised months earlier and in which some former National Alliance parliamentarians such as Marcello Taglialatela, Francesco Biava and Marco Martinelli were active, in which Alemanno criticised the sanctions against Russia, describing them as counterproductive for the Italian economy. In the summer of 2023, he supported the 'Committee Reject the War' (Italian: Ripudia la Guerra) and the Committee 'Future Generations' for two petitions for a referendum on stopping the sending of arms to Ukraine, failing to collect 500,000 signatures. On 29 and 30 July he launched the Forum for Italian Independence in Orvieto, where he criticised Giorgia Meloni and Brothers of Italy.

On 25 and 26 November Alemanno launched Independence, unveiling the party logo and declaring his intention to participate in the next European elections. Present at the party's founding assembly were Cateno De Luca, leader of South calls North, and Marco Rizzo, leader of Sovereign Popular Democracy, with whom Alemanno said they both shared common ideas. Alemanno criticised the Meloni government as the most Atlanticist in the history of the Italian Republic, claiming his movement to be close to ultraconservatism. Independence was joined by former CasaPound leader Simone Di Stefano, Massimo Arlechino, Fabio Granata, Marcello Taglialatela, and Nicola Colosimo, spokesman for 'Magnitudo'.

On 31 March 2026, the Indipendenza! movement merged with Roberto Vannacci’s National Future.

== Leadership ==
- Secretary: Gianni Alemanno (2023–2026)
  - First Deputy Secretary: Marcello Taglialatela (2023–2026)
  - Deputy Secretary: Nicola Colosimo (2023–2026), Felice Costini (2023–2026), Simone Di Stefano (2023–2024), Luigia Passaro (2023–2026)
- President: Massimo Arlechino (2023–2026)
