= FareFuturo =

Italian political foundation

- Abbreviation: FF
- Formation: 15 May 2007; 19 years ago
- Legal status: Foundation
- Purpose: Political activism
- Headquarters: Via Vittoria Colonna, 11; 00193 Rome
- President: Adolfo Urso
- Main organ: Charta minuta
- Parent organization: Future and Freedom (2011–2013); FareItalia (2013–present)
- Website: farefuturofondazione.it

FareFuturo (meaning "MakeFuture", FF) is a right-wing think tank, which intend develop a new liberal conservative and secular-minded right, on the model of Nicolas Sarkozy's UMP, David Cameron's Conservatives and José María Aznar's PP, who also participated in the foundation.

== History ==
The foundation was launched in February 2007 by Gianfranco Fini, leader of National Alliance (AN), and Adolfo Urso, MP for the same party, at a convention that rallied 105 personalities of the culture, economy and arts sectors, including former Constitutional Court President Annibale Marini, TV personality and lawyer Tina Lagostena Bassi, the rector of the Milan Polytechnic Giovanni Azzone, sociologist Sabino Acquaviva, actor Luca Barbareschi, television host Rita Dalla Chiesa and operatic soprano Cecilia Gasdia. According to the founders, FareFuturo hadn't the purpose to succeed AN, but enlarge under a European perspective the culture of the Italian right-wing, re-organizing it after the defeat of the House of Freedoms in the 2006 election.

The think tank FareFuturo was officially founded on 15 May 2007 in Rome. Also former Spanish PM José Aznar attended the foundative meeting, expressing his desire to see AN join in the European People's Party (EPP), the main centre-right party in the European Union. In September 2007, thanks to Aznar's pressure, FareFuturo attende the meeting of the Centre for European Studies, the EPP's think tank.

In April 2009, a statement of political analyst Sofia Ventura about the TV showgirls (veline) involvement in Italian politics, published on the web-magazine of FareFuturo, caused polemics and criticisms also inside the same political area of the foundation, especially about the presumed attitude of Fini's main ally Silvio Berlusconi. In November 2009, FareFuturo started a solid cooperation with FAES, the Aznar's foundation.

In 2010, during tensions inside the recently founded The People of Freedom (PdL) party between Berlusconi and Fine, FareFuturo sided with the Finiani, who finally left the party in February 2011 to found Future and Freedom (FLI), a liberal conservative party led by Fini. In March 2011, however, many members left the foundation and the web-magazine was closed. Fini resigned the presidency over the foundation in favour to Urso, who became the new president. Urso rapidly fell in disagreement with the now-centrist policy of Fini, who established the New Pole for Italy, a coalition between FLI, the Union of the Centre (UDC) and API. Instead to re-align the foundation to the PdL, Urso prosecuted a policy of distance between all the centre-right parties, claiming for a "popular constituent" for the creation of conservative party, who will had to represent the EPP in Italy. To represent this project, in April 2011 Urso created the foundation FareItalia (literally "MakeItaly"), that in 2013 joined in the national-conservative party Brothers of Italy (FdI), led by Giorgia Meloni. In January 2018, Urso was selected by FdI candidate for the Chamber of Deputies, in prevision to the 2018 election.
