= Tough Choices =

Tough Choices may refer to:

- A memoir by CEO and 2016 US Republican Presidential Candidate Carly Fiorina
- A British Drug Interventions Programme

== See also ==
- Choice (disambiguation)
