= List of presidents of the Province of Reggio Calabria =

President of the Province of Reggio Calabria
- Presidente della Provincia di Reggio Calabria
- Inaugural holder: Francesco Medici
- Formation: 1889
- Final holder: Giuseppe Raffa
- Abolished: 2016
- Superseded by: Metropolitan mayor of Reggio Calabria

The president of the Province of Reggio Calabria was the head of the provincial administration of Reggio Calabria, a local government authority in Calabria, Italy.

== History ==
The office of president of the Province of Reggio Calabria was established in 1889, initially within the Provincial Deputation. Before that date, the Deputation was headed by the prefect. During the Fascist period (1926–1944), the province was governed by appointed officials, including commissioners and presidents of the Rectorate. After World War II, the office was restored and gradually redefined within the Italian Republic, first with indirect election by the Provincial Council and, from 1994, with direct popular election.

The province was eventually replaced in 2016 by the Metropolitan City of Reggio Calabria.

== List ==
=== Presidents of the Provincial Deputation (1889–1924) ===
No.	Portrait	Name	Term of office		Party
No.	Portrait	Name	Start	End	Party
1		Francesco Medici	1889	1899	?
2		Francesco Carlizzi	1899	1905	?
3		Antonio Sarlo	1905	1907	?
4		Pasquale Reytani	1907	1916?	?

=== Presidents of the Provincial Deputation (1944–1952) ===
No.	Portrait	Name	Term of office		Party
No.	Portrait	Name	Start	End	Party
		?	?	?	?
—		Francesco Geraci (Special Commissioner)	30 August 1946	?	Italian Socialist Party
—		Luigi Calenda (Special Commissioner)	?	18 September 1948	—
		Ugo Tropea	18 September 1948	14 June 1952	Christian Democracy

=== Presidents of the Province (1952–2016) ===
No.	Portrait	Name	Term of office		Party
No.	Portrait	Name	Start	End	Party
		Ugo Tropea	14 June 1952	1960	Christian Democracy
		?	?	?	?
		Cosimo Iannopollo	11 May 1977	3 June 1981	Italian Socialist Party
		Fortunato Licandro	1981	1984	Christian Democracy
		Pantaleo Gullì	1984	1985	Christian Democracy
		Vincenzo Gallizzi	1985	17 August 1990	Italian Socialist Party
		Michele Furfaro	17 August 1990	31 October 1991	Italian Socialist Party
		Francesco Libri	27 December 1991	9 September 1992	Italian Republican Party
		Mario Galletta	13 November 1992	11 October 1993	Christian Democracy
		Umberto Pirilli	2 July 1994	25 May 1998	National Alliance
		Cosimo Antonio Calabrò	25 May 1998	28 May 2002	Italian People's Party
		Pietro Fuda	28 May 2002	30 November 2005	Forza Italia
—		Oreste Iovino (Special Commissioner)	30 November 2005	7 June 2006	—
		Giuseppe Morabito	7 June 2006	3 June 2011	Democrats of the Left; Democratic Party
		Giuseppe Raffa	3 June 2011	8 August 2016	The People of Freedom

== See also ==
- List of mayors of Reggio Calabria
- Metropolitan City of Reggio Calabria

== Sources ==
- "Storia amministrativa dell'ente". Ministero dell'Interno.
- Menichini, Piera (2005). "I presidenti delle Province dall'Unità alla Grande guerra: repertorio analitico". Storia Amministrazione Costituzione (13): 282–283.
