= Election (disambiguation) =

An election is a political process.

Election may also refer to:

== Film and television ==
- Election (1999 film), an American comedy starring Reese Witherspoon and Matthew Broderick
- Election (2005 film), a Hong Kong action thriller directed by Johnnie To
- Election (2013 film), an Indian action drama film directed by Om Prakash Rao
- Election (2024 film), an Indian Tamil-language film
- Election (TV series), a 2008 British television series
- The Election, a Hong Kong television series
- "The Election" (Dawson's Creek), a 1998 television episode
- "The Election" (Saved by the Bell), a 1989 television episode
- "Election" (The Vicar of Dibley), a 1994 television episode
- "Election", an episode of the Indian TV series The Suite Life of Karan & Kabir

== Other uses ==
- Election (novel), by Tom Perrotta
- Election (Christianity), a theological term
- Predestination, a religious concept
  - Conditional election
  - Unconditional election
- Leader election, a concept in distributed computing
- Election (horse), a Thoroughbred racehorse
- Electional astrology, the study of astrologically auspicious times to begin an event

== See also ==
- -elect
- Choice (disambiguation)
