= Marco Martinelli =

Marco Martinelli may refer to:

- Marco Martinelli (volleyball)
- Marco Martinelli (politician)
