= La Russa =

La Russa is an Italian surname. Notable people with the surname include:

- Adrienne La Russa (born 1948), American actress
- Ignazio La Russa (born 1947), Italian politician
- Romano Maria La Russa (born 1952), Italian politician
- Tony La Russa (born 1944), American former baseball manager and player
