= Russa =

Russa may refer to:

- Staraya Russa, a town in Novgorod Oblast, Russia
- Robert Russa Moton (1867–1940), African-American educator and author
- Márcia Matos Calaça (born 1963), commonly known as Russa, Brazilian footballer

== See also ==
- La Russa
- Russia (disambiguation)
