= My Choice =

My Choice may refer to:

- "My body, my choice", a slogan

== Film and television ==
- My Choice (film), a 2015 short film directed by Homi Adajania
- It's Not My Choice, a 2015 film directed by Priyakanta Laishram
- Sadda Haq (TV series) (Sadda Haq - My Life, My Choice), an Indian TV series

== Music ==
- My Choice (album), 2002 compilation album by Shinhwa
- "My Choice" (song), 2006 song by Jolin Tsai
- "My Girl: My Choice", a mini album by A.C.E.

== See also ==
- Choice (disambiguation)
- The Choice (disambiguation)
