= Giorgio Bernini =

Italian jurist and politician (1928–2020)

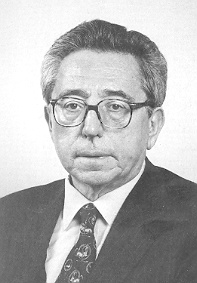

Minister of Foreign Trade
- In office 10 May 1994 – 17 January 1995
- Prime Minister: Silvio Berlusconi
- Preceded by: Paolo Baratta
- Succeeded by: Alberto Clò

Member of the Chamber of Deputies
- In office 15 April 1994 – 8 May 1996
- Constituency: Umbria

Personal details
- Born: 9 November 1928 Bologna, Italy
- Died: 22 October 2020 (aged 91) Bologna, Italy
- Party: Forza Italia
- Children: Anna Maria Bernini
- Education: University of Bologna
- Profession: Politician, university professor, lawyer

Giorgio Bernini (9 November 1928 – 22 October 2020) was an Italian jurist, academic and politician. He was the father of Anna Maria Bernini.

== Biography ==
Giorgio Bernini graduated in law in 1950; he was a lawyer since 1951 and cassationist since 1965. He was also a university professor in Ferrara (1964–1966), Padua (1966–1970) and in other foreign universities.

He often collaborated with the UN: he was a member of the commission for International Trade Law (1969–1972) and of the non-governmental organization of the United Nations (1986–1994), of which he was honorary president.

Elected to the Chamber of Deputies in 1994 with the Pole of Freedoms, he served as Minister of Foreign Trade in the first Berlusconi government. In 1996 he left politics.

In 1999 he resigned from the Antitrust Authority to be able to return to the profession of lawyer privately. In 2001 he was appointed president of the Italian Railway Network and vice president of the Confindustria of Lazio.

Bernini died on 22 October 2020 at the age of 91.
