= Donato Lamorte =

Italian politician (1931–2014)

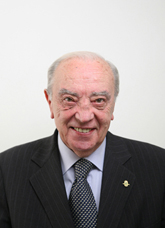

Member of the Chamber of Deputies
- In office 2001–2013

Personal details
- Born: 1 March 1931 Rionero in Vulture, Basilicata, Italy
- Died: 21 August 2014 (aged 83) Rome, Lazio, Italy
- Party: MSI (1949–1995); AN (1995–2009); PdL (2009–2010); FLI (2010–2013)

Donato Lamorte (1 March 1931 – 21 August 2014) was an Italian politician.

== Biography ==
Donato Lamorte was born in Rionero in Vulture on March 1, 1931. During the Second World War he moved with his family to Asmara, returning to Italy at the end of the conflict. He joined the Italian Social Movement in 1949.

For decades he organized the rallies, the congresses and printed the posters for the party. He was the man of confidence of Giorgio Almirante first and then of Gianfranco Fini. In 1995, after the dissolution of the Italian Social Movement, it joined National Alliance.

He was provincial councilor of Rome for 18 years. In 2001, he was elected to the Chamber of Deputies for the first time; he was then re-elected in 2006 and 2008. After joining the People of Freedom in 2009, in which National Alliance had merged, in 2010 he followed Fini to his new party, Future and Freedom.

He died in 2014 at the age of 83.
