= Francesco Medici =

Italian lawyer and politician (1830–1903)

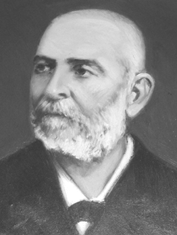
- Portrait of Francesco Medici

Senator of the Kingdom of Italy
- In office 14 June 1886 – 5 February 1903
- Appointed by: Umberto I of Italy

President of the Province of Reggio Calabria
- In office 1889–1897
- Succeeded by: Francesco Carlizzi

President of the Provincial Council of Reggio Calabria
- In office 1881–1885
- Preceded by: Domenico Spanò Bolani
- Succeeded by: Fabrizio Plutino

Personal details
- Born: 2 July 1830 Bianco, Kingdom of the Two Sicilies
- Died: 5 February 1903 (aged 72) Reggio Calabria, Kingdom of Italy
- Spouse: Clementina Scaglione
- Occupation: Lawyer

Francesco Medici (2 July 1830 – 5 February 1903) was an Italian lawyer and politician who served as a Senator of the Kingdom of Italy from 1886 until his death. He was also active in local government in Reggio Calabria, serving as the first president of the Province and president of the Provincial Council.
