= Romano Maria La Russa =

Italian politician

Romano Maria La Russa (born 11 January 1952 in Paternò) is an Italian politician and Member of the European Parliament for North-West with the Alleanza Nazionale, part of the Union for a Europe of Nations and sits on the European Parliament's Committee on Civil Liberties, Justice and Home Affairs.

He is a substitute for the Committee on Economic and Monetary Affairs, a vice-chair of the Delegation for relations with Iran and a substitute for the Delegation for relations with the Gulf States, including Yemen.

== Biography ==
Born in Paternò(Catania), he is the youngest of four children of Antonino La Russa—a lawyer, business executive, politician, secretary of the National Fascist Party in Paternò during the 1940s, and, after the war, a member of parliament for the Italian Social Movement—and Maria Concetta Oliveri, who came from a wealthy family in Paternò. He is the younger brother of Vincenzo (1938–2021) and Ignazio La Russa(1947)—both of whom were also lawyers and politicians—and Emilia.

He grew up in Milan, where he settled with his family in 1960; in the Lombard capital, he attended elementary school and earned his classical high school diploma at the Giosuè Carducci High School. From the 1980s through the first decade of the 2000s, La Russa was active as an entrepreneur in the wholesale sanitary ware business through a company based in Pero, Lombardy, in the Milan area.

== Education ==
- Secondary school-leaving certificate
- Member of the AN national party executive

== Career ==
- 1990-2004: Municipal Councillor of Cinisello Balsamo (Milan) (1985-1990) and of Sesto San Giovanni (Milan)
- 1995-2004: AN group leader in the Regional Government
- 1995-2004: Member of the Regional Executive

== See also ==
2004 European Parliament election in Italy
