= FareItalia =

FareItalia (translation: MakeItaly) was an Italian conservative political association.

The group was founded in April 2011 by Adolfo Urso, Andrea Ronchi and Giuseppe Scalia as a "moderate" faction within Future and Freedom (FLI) in opposition to the party's "radicals" (Italo Bocchino, Fabio Granata, etc.). In May Ronchi resigned from president of FLI's national assembly. In June the three left the party altogether. Since then, they have functioned as an external faction of The People of Freedom (PdL), the party of which they all belonged before being founding members of FLI in July 2010. In November 2011 Ronchi was appointed by PdL secretary Angelino Alfano to the delegation for the European People's Party's congress in Marseille. In this respect, the party's goal was to unite all Italian "popular" forces. Despite that, in March 2014 Urso joined the national-conservative Brothers of Italy instead.

At its height, the party counted four deputies (Urso, Ronchi, Scalia and Antonio Buonfiglio), two senators in the National Cohesion group (Giuseppe Menardi and Maurizio Saia) and one MEP. None of them was included in the PdL's slates for the 2013 general election.

Since 2014 Adolfo Urso has sided with Brothers of Italy, a party formed mainly by former members of National Alliance.

== Leadership ==
- President: Adolfo Urso (since 2011)
- Secretary-general: Andrea Ronchi (2011–2013), Sergio Marchi (since 2013)
- Administrative Secretary: Maurizio Saia (2011–2013)
- Organization Coordinator: Giovanni Collino (2011–2013)
