= Nicola Pasetto =

Italian politician (1961–1997)

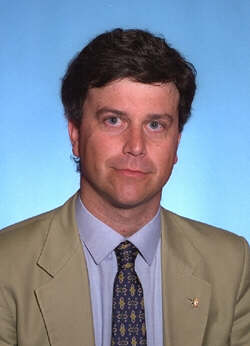
Nicola Pasetto

Nicola Pasetto (20 June 1961, in Verona – 29 March 1997) was an Italian politician. He represented the Italian Social Movement (from 1992 to 1995) and the National Alliance (from 1995 to 1997) in the Chamber of Deputies.

== Biography ==
He joined the Youth Front (Italy) at the age of 14; by 1979, he was the provincial secretary for Verona, and in 1980 he was elected to the city council as a member of the MSI, one of the youngest council members in Italy. On the evening of April 4, 1981, Pasetto was involved in a brawl between poster hangers from opposing factions; he was arrested and held in jail for about a month until he was acquitted in the subsequent trial. In the 1980s, he served on the National Executive Committee and the Executive Board of the Youth Front.

After earning a Jurisprudence degree and marrying Roberta Benedetti in 1991, Pasetto remained on the city council of Verona until 1992, when he was elected to the Chamber of Deputies for the Italian Social Movement in Constituency VII – Veneto 1. During that legislative term, he served on the Finance Committee.

He was re-elected to the Chamber of Deputies in 1994 and re-elected again in 1996, representing the National Alliance (Italy). On October 20, 1994, he was involved in a famous brawl that took place in Parliament between members of the Italian Social Movement and the Communist Refoundation Party. During the 11th legislature, he served on the Standing Committee on Finance and the Special Committee for the Examination of Bills on Parliamentary Immunity. In the 12th legislature, he served on the Standing Committee on Justice, and in the 13th legislature, on the Standing Committee on Social Affairs.

He died on March 29, 1997, at the age of 35, in a car accident on the Autostrada A4 (Italy).
