= Choice (disambiguation) =

Choice involves deciding between multiple options.

Choice(s) may also refer to:

== Media ==
=== Film ===
- Choices (1986 film), a television film directed by David Lowell Rich
- Choices (2021 film), an OTT Indian film
- No Other Choice, 2025 South Korean film

=== Music ===
==== Performers ====
- Choice (producer), Laurent Garnier (born 1966), French techno music producer and DJ
- Choice (rapper), Kim Davis, American rapper
- Choice, a 1990s American R&B girl group featuring Pink

==== Albums ====
- Choice, a series of compilation albums from Azuli Records
- Choice, by Central Line, 1983
- Choice, an EP by Victon, 2022
- Choices (Dewey Redman album), 1992
- Choices (Terence Blanchard album), 2009
- Choices: The Album, by Three 6 Mafia, 2001
- Choices – The Singles Collection, by the Blow Monkeys, 1989
- Choices (EP), by Clint Lowery (under the name Hello Demons...Meet Skeletons), 2013
- Choices, by Lucy Spraggan, 2021

==== Songs ====
- "Choices" (Billy Yates song), 1997; covered by George Jones, 1999
- "Choices" (The Hoosiers song), 2010
- "Choices (Yup)", by E-40, 2014
- "Choices", by Mudvayne from Lost and Found, 2005
- "Choices", by Le Sserafim, 2023

=== Television ===
==== Television episodes ====
- "Choice" (The Acolyte), a 2024 Star Wars episode
- "Choices" (Buffy the Vampire Slayer), a 1999 episode
- "Choices" (Holby City), a 2001 episode
- "Choices" (Knots Landing), a 1981 episode
- "Choices" (Tales of the Jedi), a 2022 Star Wars episode

==== Television channels ====
- BBC Choice, a defunct British digital channel
  - BBC Choice Wales
  - BBC Choice Scotland
  - BBC Choice Northern Ireland
- Choice TV, a New Zealand channel

=== Video games ===
- Choices: Stories You Play, a 2016 mobile game

== Politics and law ==
- Choice of law, a trial stage
- Pro-choice, a term used by abortion rights proponents

== Publications ==
- Choice (Australian magazine), a publication of the Australian consumer organisation of the same name
- Choice (American magazine), a publication of the American Library Association
- Choices (journal), a food industry policy magazine

== Science and technology ==
- Choice (command), a shell command to prompt a user to select one item from a set of one-character choices
- Choices (operating system), object-oriented operating system, developed at University of Illinois
- Choice modelling, in research
- Design choice, in engineering

== Other uses ==
- Choice (Australian consumer organisation)
- Choice (credit card), issued by Citibank
- Choice, Texas, an American unincorporated community
- Choice Hotels, a hospitality holding corporation
- RTÉ Choice, an Irish digital radio station
- Tashard Choice (born 1984), American football running back

== See also ==
- The Choice (disambiguation)
- My Choice (disambiguation)
- Choc ice
- TV Choice, a British weekly TV listings magazine
