= L'Italia settimanale =

Defunct Italian political magazine (1992–1996)

- Categories: Political magazine
- Frequency: Weekly
- Founded: 1992
- First issue: 16 December 1992
- Final issue: March 1996
- Country: Italy
- Based in: Rome
- Language: Italian

L'Italia settimanale was a right-wing political magazine published in Rome, Italy. The magazine was established in 1992 and the first issue appeared on 16 December 1992. Marcello Veneziani was the founding director of the magazine, which was published weekly on Wednesdays. Veneziani left the magazine in 1995 when the publisher was partially acquired by an Uruguayan company. Pietrangelo Buttafuoco served as the director succeeding him in the post.

At the end of 1995 L'Italia settimanale was relaunched following a temporary closure. The magazine folded in March 1996 due to the bankruptcy of the publishing company.
