= Design choice =

Choice to satisfy an engineering development requirement

Montana design choices

A design choice describes the planned way to satisfy an engineering development requirement in a way that could be satisfied differently. Often, there are multiple ways to satisfy a requirement, which necessitates making choices to select from possible design options. Selection is often based on financial considerations, often resulting in the least expensive option.

In civil engineering, design choices typically derive from basic principles of materials science and structural design. A suspension bridge, for example, uses the fact that steel is extremely efficient in tension, while a prestressed concrete bridge takes advantage of concrete's relatively low cost by weight and its ability to sustain high compressive loading (see compression).
