= Umberto Pirilli =

Italian politician (born 1940)

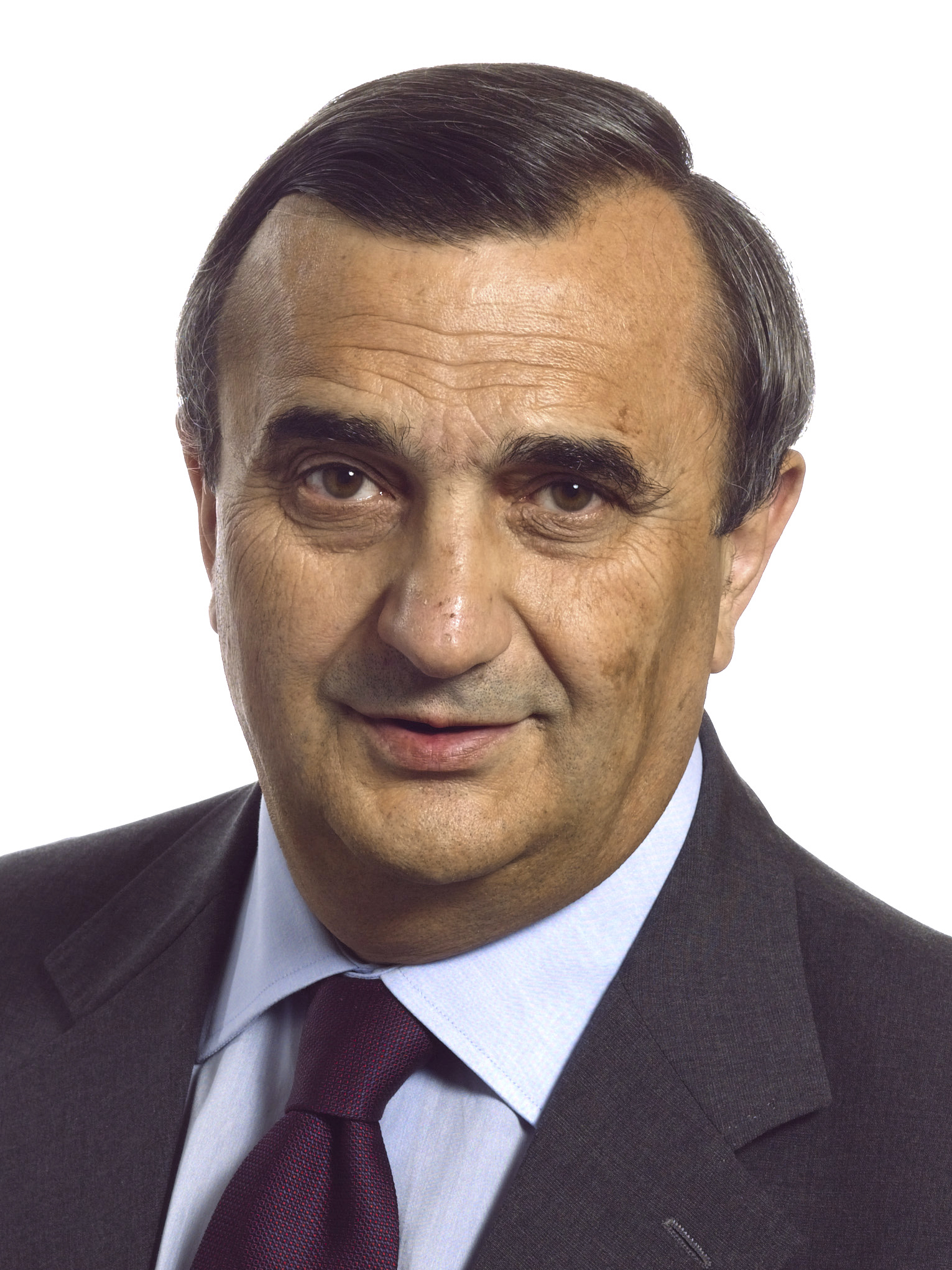

Member of the European Parliament
- In office 20 July 2004 – 13 July 2009
- Constituency: Southern Italy

President of the Province of Reggio Calabria
- In office 26 June 1994 – 24 May 1998
- Preceded by: Mario Galletta
- Succeeded by: Cosimo Antonio Calabrò

Personal details
- Born: 25 September 1940 (age 85) Gioia Tauro, Province of Reggio Calabria, Kingdom of Italy
- Party: Italian Social Movement; National Alliance; The People of Freedom; Brothers of Italy
- Occupation: University lecturer, journalist

Umberto Pirilli (born 25 September 1940) is an Italian politician who served as a member of the European Parliament and president of the Province of Reggio Calabria.

In 2004, he was elected to the European Parliament in the Southern Italy constituency with National Alliance, part of the Union for a Europe of Nations. He was part of the Committee on Industry, Research and Energy. He was a substitute for the Committee on Foreign Affairs and a member of the Delegation to the EU-Bulgaria Joint Parliamentary Committee.
