= The Choice =

The Choice may refer to:

== Books ==
- The Choice (novel), a novel by Nicholas Sparks
- The Choice, 1984 novel by Og Mandino
- The Choice, a non-fiction book about Bill Clinton's 1996 presidential campaign by Bob Woodward
- The Choice (Goldratt book), a book by Eliyahu M. Goldratt and Efrat Goldratt-Ashlag
- The Choice, a 1993 book by Muslim preacher Ahmed Deedat

== Film ==
- The Choice (1976 film), a film by Jacques Faber starring Claude Jade in a dual role
- Yam Daabo, released in English as The Choice, a 1986 film by Idrissa Ouedraogo
- The Choice (2015 film), an Italian film directed by Michele Placido
- The Choice (2016 film), a film adaptation of the Nicholas Sparks novel
- The Choice (1970 film), by Youssef Chahine

== Television ==
=== Series ===
- The Choice (American TV series), a 2012 dating game show
- Hostage (TV series) (working title The Choice), a 2025 British political thriller series

=== Episodes ===
- "The Choice" (Dynasty May 1986)
- "The Choice" (Dynasty November 1986)
- "The Choice" (Farscape), 2001
- "The Choice" (Homeland), 2012
- "The Choice" (House), 2010
- "The Choice" (The Outer Limits), 1995
- "The Choice" (Suits), 2012
- "The Choice" (Veep), 2014

== Music ==
- "The Choice", a 1990 song by Neurosis from The Word as Law
- "The Choice", a track from the soundtrack of the 2015 video game Undertale by Toby Fox

== Other ==
- The Choice (play), a 1764 play by Arthur Murphy
- The Choice (painting), a 1909 watercolor painting by Frances MacDonald (available on Wikimedia Commons)
- The Choice (radio series), an interview series on BBC Radio 4 presented by Michael Buerk
- KTSU, a college radio station branded as "The Choice"

== See also ==
- Choice (disambiguation)
