= Andrea Ronchi =

Italian politician

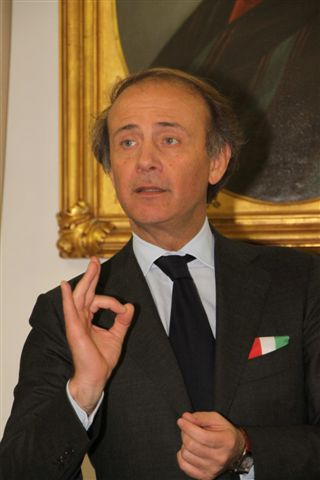

Minister of European Affairs
- In office 8 May 2008 – 15 November 2010
- Prime Minister: Silvio Berlusconi
- Preceded by: Emma Bonino
- Succeeded by: Anna Maria Bernini

Member of the Chamber of Deputies
- In office 2001–2013

Personal details
- Born: 3 August 1955 (age 71) Perugia, Italy
- Party: Italian Social Movement (until 1995); National Alliance (1995–2009); The People of Freedom (2009–2010); Future and Freedom (2010–2011); FareItalia (since 2011)
- Education: Sapienza University of Rome
- Profession: Politician, journalist

Andrea Ronchi (born 3 August 1955) is an Italian politician, former Italian Minister of European Affairs.

== Biography ==
Andrea Ronchi was born in Perugia, Umbria. He graduated in political science and worked as journalist. He was a founding member of the National Alliance party.

In 2001, he was elected to the Chamber of Deputies. He was reelected in 2006 as a member of People of Freedom. In 2005, he was appointed by Gianfranco Fini as National Spokesman for National Alliance. He served as Minister of European Affairs into the Berlusconi IV Cabinet from 2008 to 2010. In 2010, Ronchi left The People of Freedom and joined Future and Freedom, the new party founded by Fini.

Shortly after having been appointed as chairman of the National Assembly of the Future and Freedom party on 13 February 2011, Ronchi and other party leaders, like Adolfo Urso, criticised Gianfranco Fini for allegedly departing from centre-right values. Ronchi resigned on 18 May and left the party on 9 July, upon Angelino Alfano's appointment as secretary of The People of Freedom, and founded a new centre-right association, FareItalia.
