= Alessandro Foglietta =

Italian politician

Alessandro Foglietta (born 1 February 1953, in Supino) is an Italian politician and Member of the European Parliament for Central with the Alleanza Nazionale, Treasurer of the Union for a Europe of Nations and sits on the European Parliament's Committee on the Environment, Public Health and Food Safety.

He is a substitute for the Committee on Budgetary Control and the Committee on Economic and Monetary Affairs. He is also a member of the Delegation to the EU-Chile Joint Parliamentary Committee.

== Education ==
- Diploma in accounting studies
- 1976: Commercial representative
- office worker (1979) and managing director (1986) in private industry
- 1970: Section Secretary of the Youth Front
- 1980: Secretary of the MSI, Supino (Frosinone) section (1976) then provincial leader of Frosinone
- 1988: Member of the Central Committee of MSI

== Career ==
- 1997–2004: Chairman of the Frosinone provincial Federation of AN
- AN official responsible for 'social cohesion'
- Deputy Mayor (1993) and Municipal Councillor (1994–2005) of Supino
- Regional Councillor (1996–2005) of Lazio Region

== See also ==
- 2004 European Parliament election in Italy
