= List of Italian Liberal Party politicians =

A list of notable Italian Liberal Party politicians:

== A ==
- Renato Altissimo
- Giovanni Amendola

== B ==
- Luigi Barzini, Jr.
- Bortolo Belotti
- Alfredo Biondi
- Manlio Brosio
- Pietro Bucalossi

== C ==
- Roberto Cassinelli
- Leone Cattani
- Raffaele Costa
- Benedetto Croce

== D ==
- Giuseppe De Capitani D'Arzago
- Raffaele De Caro
- Paolo De Castro
- Francesco De Lorenzo
- Enrico De Nicola

== E ==
- Luigi Einaudi

== G ==
- Giancarlo Galan
- Fabio Gava
- Niccolò Ghedini
- Giuseppe Grassi (politico)
- Paolo Guzzanti

== M ==
- Benedetto Majorana della Nicchiara
- Giovanni Francesco Malagodi
- Antonio Martino
- Francesco Martino
- Gaetano Martino

== P ==
- Dino Philipson
- Sergio Pininfarina

== S ==
- Carlo Scognamiglio
- Vittorio Sgarbi
- Edgardo Sogno

== V ==
- Bruno Villabruna

== Z ==
- Valerio Zanone
