= Mario Landolfi =

Italian politician (born 1959)

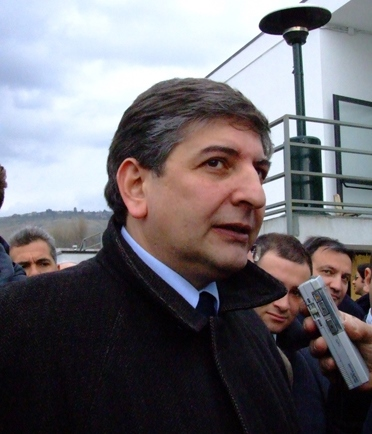

Minister of Communications
- In office 23 April 2005 – 17 May 2006
- Prime Minister: Silvio Berlusconi
- Preceded by: Maurizio Gasparri
- Succeeded by: Paolo Gentiloni

Personal details
- Born: Mario Landolfi; 6 June 1959 (age 66) Mondragone, Italy
- Party: Alleanza Nazionale
- Height: 1.75 m (5 ft 9 in)

Mario Landolfi (born 6 June 1959) is an Italian politician, served as a member of the parliament and minister of communications.

== Early life ==
Landolfi was born in Mondragone, the province of Caserta, on 6 June 1959.

== Career ==
Landolfi was a council member of Mondragone beginning in 1983. He became a member of the Italian parliament in June 2001, being part of the National Alliance party. In addition, Landolfi served as the spokesman of the AN. He was a Member of the Chamber of Deputies from 1994 to 2013. He served as the member of different parliamentary commissions. He was appointed Minister of communications to the cabinet led by prime minister Silvio Berlusconi in a reshuffle on 23 April 2005, replacing another AN deputy Maurizio Gasparri in the post. On 17 May 2006, Landolfi's term ended, and Paolo Gentiloni became the new minister of communications.

Landolfi was appointed president of the state television watchdog, Commissione vigilanza, after leaving office in 2006.
