= List of Democracy is Freedom – The Daisy politicians =

A list of notable Democracy is Freedom – The Daisy politicians of Italy:

== A ==
- Lorenzo Acquarone
- Alfonso Andria

== B ==
- Giovanni Bianchi
- Enzo Bianco
- Gerardo Bianco
- Rosy Bindi
- Paola Binetti
- Carlo Bo
- Guido Bodrato
- Willer Bordon

== C ==
- Massimo Cacciari
- Salvatore Cardinale
- Pierluigi Castagnetti
- Luigi Cocilovo
- Tommaso Coletti

== D ==
- Luciano D'Alfonso
- Sergio D'Antoni
- Pier Giorgio Dall'Acqua
- Ciriaco De Mita
- Lorenzo Dellai
- Graziano Delrio
- Bruno Dettori
- Lamberto Dini

== F ==
- Giuseppe Fioroni
- Domenico Fisichella
- Maurizio Fistarol
- Marco Formentini
- Aniello Formisano
- Francesco Fortugno
- Dario Franceschini

== G ==
- Paolo Gentiloni
- Roberto Giachetti
- Paolo Giaretta

== I ==
- Rosa Russo Iervolino

== L ==
- Linda Lanzillotta
- Enrico Letta
- Andrea Losco

== M ==
- Antonio Maccanico
- Enrico Manca
- Nicola Mancino
- Franco Marini
- Sergio Mattarella
- Alessia Mosca

== O ==
- Leoluca Orlando

== P ==
- Arturo Parisi
- Pina Picierno
- Lapo Pistelli
- Giovanni Procacci
- Romano Prodi
- Vittorio Prodi

== R ==
- Matteo Renzi
- Sergio Reolon
- Gianni Rivera
- Ettore Rosato
- Francesco Rutelli

== S ==
- Giulio Santagata
- Gian Mario Spacca
- Gianluca Susta

== T ==
- Patrizia Toia

== V ==
- Achille Variati
- Donato Veraldi
- Gianni Vernetti

== Z ==
- Valerio Zanone
