= Adolfo Urso =

Italian politician (born 1957)

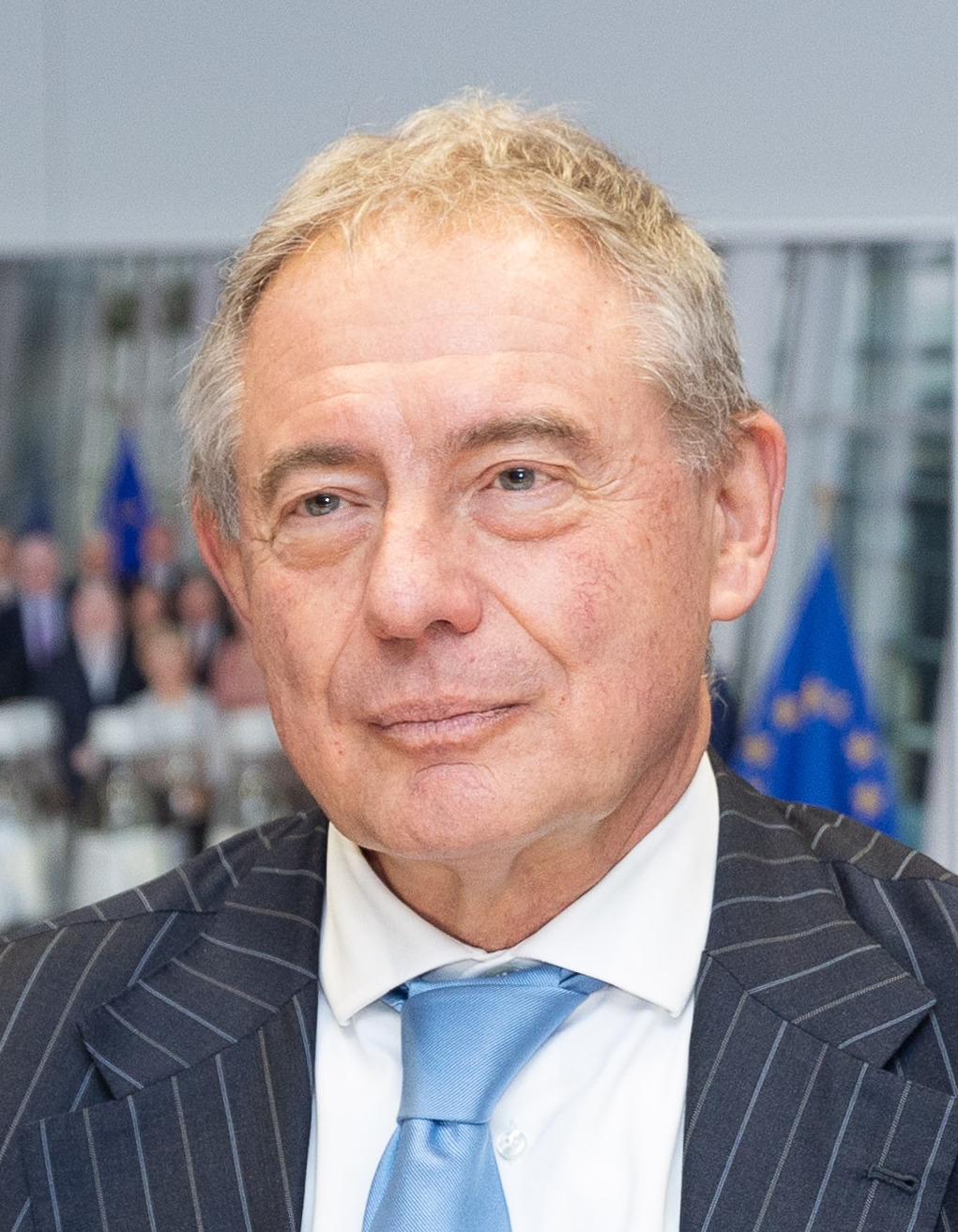
- Urso in 2024

Minister for Enterprises and Made in Italy
- Incumbent
- Assumed office 22 October 2022
- Prime Minister: Giorgia Meloni
- Preceded by: Giancarlo Giorgetti

President of COPASIR
- In office 9 June 2021 – 12 October 2022
- Preceded by: Raffaele Volpi
- Succeeded by: Lorenzo Guerini

Member of the Senate of the Republic
- Incumbent
- Assumed office 23 March 2018
- Constituency: Veneto

Member of the Chamber of Deputies
- In office 15 April 1994 – 14 March 2013
- Constituency: Lazio (1994–2001); Veneto (2001–2013)

Personal details
- Born: 1957 (age 68–69) Padua, Italy
- Party: MSI (till 1995); AN (1995–2009); PdL (2009–2010); FLI (2010–2011); FareItalia (2011–2015); FdI (since 2015)
- Education: Sapienza University of Rome
- Profession: Politician, journalist

Adolfo Urso (born 1957) is an Italian politician and journalist. In 2022, he became the Minister for Enterprises and Made in Italy. He was a founder of the conservative political party FareItalia.

== Early life and career ==
The son of Sicilian parents, Urso was born in Padua. After studying in Acireale and Catania, he graduated in sociology at the Sapienza University of Rome. He was a journalist for the neo-fascist party, Italian Social Movement's newspaper Secolo d'Italia, deputy director of the newspaper Roma (1991–1992), editor-in-chief of L'Italia settimanale (1993–94), and director of the magazine Charta Minuta (since 1994).

== Political career ==
Urso was elected deputy from 1994 to 2008 as member of National Alliance first and then of The People of Freedom. He served as Deputy Minister of Productive Activities with delegation to foreign trade in the second and third governments headed by Silvio Berlusconi. As Deputy Minister, he dealt with the internationalization of companies (Law 56/2005) and presented the Italy-Syria agreement on investment protection for parliamentary ratification (Law 258/2003).

In the fourth Berlusconi government, Urso was appointed Undersecretary and subsequently Deputy Minister of Economic Development. After joining Gianfranco Fini's new party, Future and Freedom, Urso, along with other representatives Andrea Ronchi, Roberto Menia, and Antonio Buonfiglio, as well as Giuseppe Maria Reina of the Movement for Autonomy, resigned on 15 November 2010 and left the government due to the refusal by Berlusconi to resign and form a new government open to the Union of the Centre, as had been requested by Fini.

On 19 April 2011, Urso founded the association FareItalia and on 9 July 2011, together with Andrea Ronchi and Giuseppe Scalia, he definitively left Future and Freedom. In 2015, Urso joined Brothers of Italy, a party led by Giorgia Meloni, and in 2018 was elected senator into its lists. In April 2024, Urso, as an industry minister, met with representatives of Uber to discuss the company's position in the country. This was followed by protests from a taxi driver labour union in May 2024.

== Electoral history ==
Election	House	Constituency	Party	Votes	Result
1994	Chamber of Deputies	Rome Primavalle	AN	40,072	Elected
1996	Chamber of Deputies	Rome Primavalle	AN	34,966	Not elected
1996	Chamber of Deputies	Lazio 2	AN	– (Note: Elected in a closed list proportional representation system)	Elected
2001	Chamber of Deputies	Veneto 1	AN	–	Elected
2006	Chamber of Deputies	Veneto 1	AN	–	Elected
2008	Chamber of Deputies	Veneto 2	PdL	–	Elected
2018	Senate of the Republic	Veneto 2	FdI	–	Elected
2022	Senate of the Republic	Veneto 1	FdI	–	Elected
