= Movement for Italy =

Movement for Italy Movimento per l'Italia
- Leader: Daniela Santanchè
- Founded: 22 November 2008
- Dissolved: 24 February 2010
- Split from: The Right
- Merged into: The People of Freedom
- Ideology: Conservatism; Italian nationalism
- Political position: Right-wing

Movement for Italy (Movimento per l'Italia, MpI) was a conservative political party in Italy led by Daniela Santanchè.

== History ==
In September 2008 Daniela Santanchè, spokeswoman of The Right and candidate for Prime Minister in the 2008 general election, left the party, after having fallen out with secretary Francesco Storace. Santanché opposed Storace's political line and instead proposed an alliance with the PdL. In November Santanchè launched her own party, which had allied with The People of Freedom led by Silvio Berlusconi. On 24 February 2010 the Movement for Italy definitely joined the PdL and on 1 March 2010 Santanchè was appointed Undersecretary to the Ministry for the Implementation of the Government Program in the Berlusconi IV Cabinet.

== Leadership ==
- Secretary: Daniela Santanchè (2008–2010)
  - Deputy-Secretary: Diego Zarneri (2008–2010)
