= Cristiana Muscardini =

Italian politician and writer

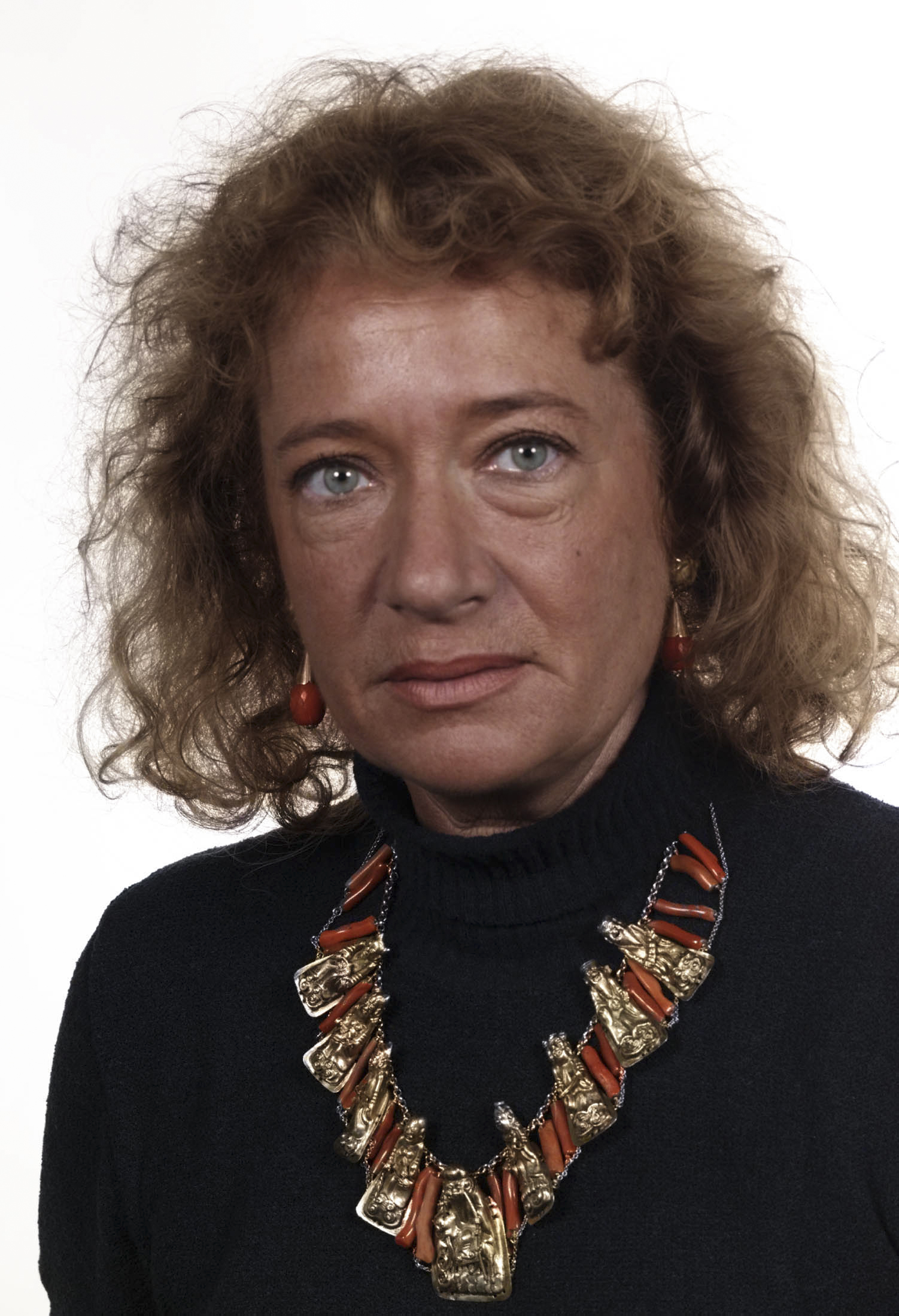
- Official portrait, 1999

Member of the European Parliament for Italy
- In office 1989–2014

Personal details
- Born: 6 November 1948 (age 78) Cannobio, Italy
- Party: European Choice
- Other political affiliations: Italian Social Movement; National Alliance; The People of Freedom; Future and Freedom; Conservatives and Social Reformers

Cristiana Muscardini (born 6 November 1948) is an Italian politician and freelance writer and publicist.

Graduated in philosophy, Cristiana Muscardini was executive of the National University Action Front, the Italian Social Movement and National Alliance. She was also a municipal councillor of Milan from 1980 to 1990 and in 1991 a municipal councillor of Varese.

In the 1983 Italian general election she was elected to the Chamber of Deputies, while in the 1989 European Parliament election she was elected MEP for the first time, re-confirmed in the successive elections of 1994, 1999, 2004 and 2009. From 2000 to 2004 she was Vice-Chairwoman of the Union for Europe of the Nations Group and from 2001 to 2009 General Secretary of the Alliance for Europe of the Nations. In 2009 she was elected to the European Parliament with The People of Freedom and she joined the European People's Party Group. In 2010 she joined the new party of Gianfranco Fini, Future and Freedom, but in 2012 she left this party to found the Conservatives and Social Reformers (CSR), joining the European Conservatives and Reformists Group in the EP.

In the 2014 European Parliament election she was a candidate with European Choice, but the list didn't exceed the threshold and she wasn't re-elected.

== Decorations ==
- Commander of the Order of St. Maurice and St. Lazarus
