= Christian Reformists =

Political faction in Italy

The Christian Reformists (Cristiano Riformisti, CR) are a Christian-democratic faction within New Centre-Right (NCD), a political party in Italy.

The group emerged as a faction within National Alliance (AN), a conservative party. Its founders included Antonio Mazzochi (ex-DC), Erder Mazzocchi (ex-DC) and Pietro Armani (ex-PRI). The main goal of CR was the admission of the party into the European People's Party (EPP).

In March 2009 the CR, along with the whole AN, joined The People of Freedom (PdL).

In September 2008 the Christian-Social European Union, a Christian-democratic association led by Gennaro Castiello (a former member of the Christian Democratic Refoundation) which had joined the PdL in April 2008, merged into the Christian Reformists, opening the way to a 40,000 members-strong "Catholic bloc".

In 2012, while still being part of the PdL, the faction presented its own lists in a few municipalities in Central Italy, gaining a notable 10.5% in Ardea, Lazio.

In November 2013 the CR left the PdL and joined NCD.
