= Marco Martinelli (politician) =

Italian politician (1962–2023)

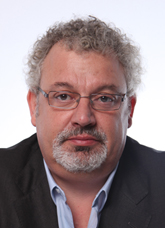
- Martinelli in 2013

Member of the Chamber of Deputies of Italy for Tuscany
- In office 28 April 2006 – 22 March 2018

Personal details
- Born: 6 December 1962 Rome, Italy
- Died: 8 October 2023 (aged 60) Rome, Italy
- Party: AN; PdL; FI
- Occupation: Consultant

Marco Martinelli (6 December 1962 – 8 October 2023) was an Italian consultant and politician and a member of the National Alliance, The People of Freedom, and Forza Italia. He also served in the Chamber of Deputies from 2006 to 2018.

Martinelli died in Rome on 8 October 2023, at the age of 60.
