= Maurizio Gasparri =

Italian politician (born 1956)

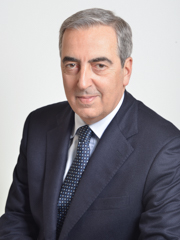

Minister of Communications
- In office 11 June 2001 – 23 April 2005
- Prime Minister: Silvio Berlusconi
- Preceded by: Salvatore Cardinale
- Succeeded by: Mario Landolfi

Member of the Senate of the Republic
- Incumbent
- Assumed office 29 April 2008
- Constituency: Lazio

Member of the Chamber of Deputies
- In office 23 April 1992 – 28 April 2008
- Constituency: Rome (1992–1996); Lazio (1996–2001); Calabria (2001–2008)

Personal details
- Born: 18 July 1956 (age 70) Rome, Italy
- Party: Forza Italia (since 2013)
- Other political affiliations: MSI (1979–1995); AN (1995–2009); PdL (2009–2013)
- Height: 1.74 m (5 ft 9 in)
- Spouse: Amina Fiorillo (m. 1980)
- Profession: politician, ex journalist

Maurizio Gasparri (born 18 July 1956) is an Italian politician.

== Career ==
Gasparri was born in Rome to parents of Campanian origins. He was educated at the Liceo Torquato Tasso in the city. In his civilian life he worked as a journalist, becoming editor-in-chief of the Secolo d'Italia, the daily paper of the post-fascist Italian Social Movement (MSI).

== Political career ==
Gasparri was formerly a member of the MSI - where he was deputy secretary of the movement's Youth Front (Fronte della Gioventù; FdG) throughout the mid-1980s - and the National Alliance (AN). From 2001 to 2005 he served as the Minister of Communications in the Berlusconi II Cabinet. It was during his time in this role that he pushed for controversial amendments to the country's telecommunications legislation, known collectively as the legge Gasparri. Following a weak showing in the regional elections of 2005, he was replaced in Berlusconi's third Cabinet by Mario Landolfi.

Alongside Ignazio La Russa, Gasparri was considered a leader of the AN mainstream faction Destra Protagonista. During the XVI legislature (2008–13), he was president of The People of Freedom (PdL) bloc in the Senate. He is against jus soli, same-sex marriage and LGBT adoption.

=== Obama controversy ===
In the wake of Barack Obama's election in November 2008, Gasparri declared on RAI that "with Obama in the White House, perhaps al-Qaeda is happier". He was heavily criticized for his comments by the Italian Democratic Party.

=== 2026 Report controversy ===
As a member of the Rai Supervisory Commission, Gasparri has been accused of having attempted to block the broadcast of the Report episode titled "La banalità del nero", which investigated the possible neofascist involvement in the 1992 Mafia massacres (Capaci and Via D'Amelio).

== Electoral history ==
Election	House	Constituency	Party	Votes	Result
1992	Chamber of Deputies	Rome–Viterbo–Latina–Frosinone	MSI	11,323	Elected
1994	Chamber of Deputies	Rome–Ciampino	AN	44,817	Elected
1996	Chamber of Deputies	Rome–Ciampino	AN	41,602	Not elected
1996	Chamber of Deputies	Lazio 1	AN	– (Note: Candidate in a closed list proportional representation system.)	Elected
2001	Chamber of Deputies	Calabria	AN	–	Elected
2006	Chamber of Deputies	Calabria	AN	–	Elected
2008	Senate of the Republic	Lazio	PdL	–	Elected
2013	Senate of the Republic	Lazio	PdL	–	Elected
2018	Senate of the Republic	Lazio	FI	–	Elected
2022	Senate of the Republic	Lazio	FI	–	Elected

== Gallery ==
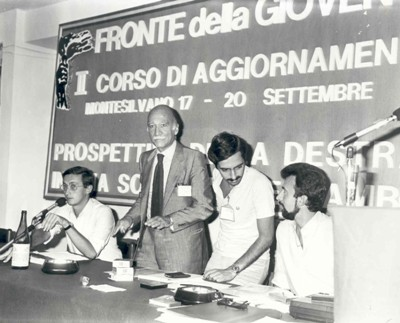
Gasparri (second from right) addressing the Youth Front in 1981, alongside Giorgio Almirante (second from left), Gianfranco Fini and Almerigo Grilz.

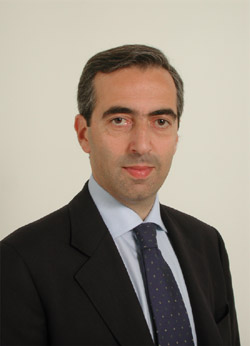
Gasparri in 2001.

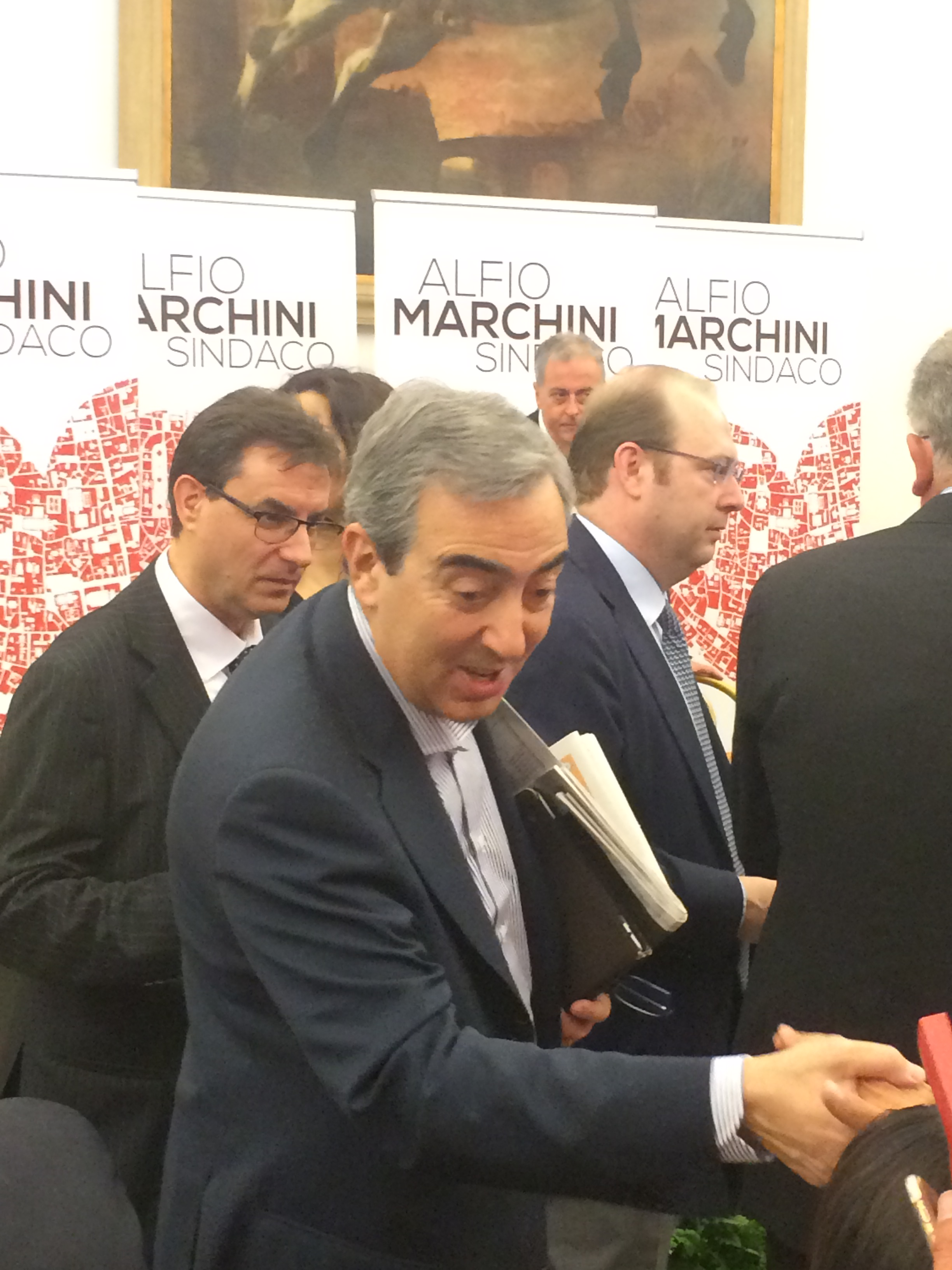
Gasparri campaigning on behalf of Alfio Marchini during the municipal elections in Rome in 2016.

== Bibliography ==
- Maurizio Gasparri; Adolfo Urso (1986). L'età dell'intelligenza. Settimo Sigillo.EAN 2565576176576
- 2005 - Fare il futuro, intervista a cura di Lucilla Parlato
- 2007 - Il cuore a destra, ed. Rubbettino
