= Ignazio La Russa =

Italian politician (born 1947)

The Honourable Ignazio La Russa
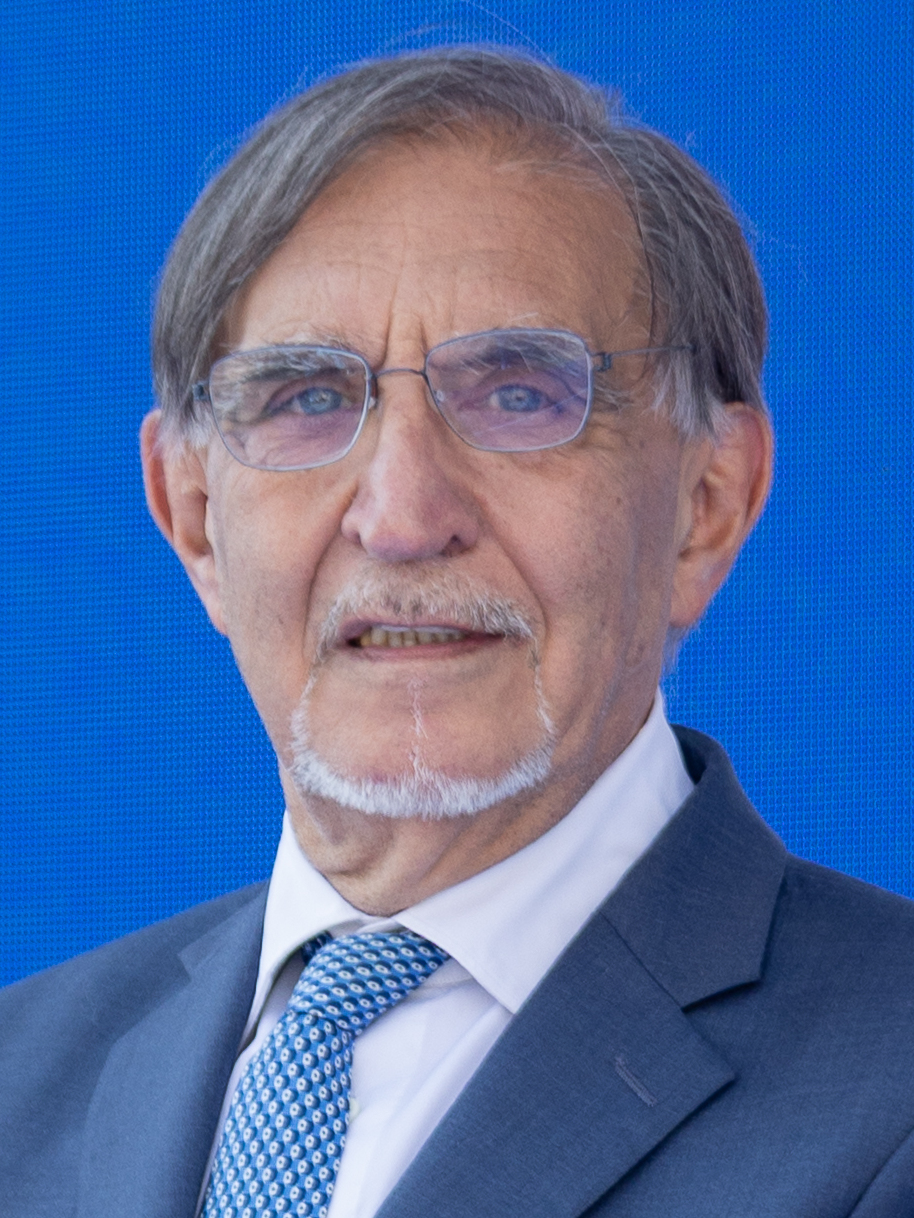
- La Russa in 2025

President of the Senate of the Republic
- Incumbent
- Assumed office 13 October 2022
- Preceded by: Elisabetta Casellati

Minister of Defence
- In office 8 May 2008 – 16 November 2011
- Prime Minister: Silvio Berlusconi
- Preceded by: Arturo Parisi
- Succeeded by: Giampaolo Di Paola
Leadership offices
President of Brothers of Italy
In office 4 April 2013 – 8 March 2014
Preceded by	Office established
Succeeded by	Giorgia Meloni
President of National Alliance
Acting; 12 May 2008 – 22 March 2009
Preceded by	Gianfranco Fini
Succeeded by	Office abolished (Note: The party merged with Forza Italia to form The People of Freedom.)
Parliamentary offices
Member of the Senate of the Republic
Incumbent
Assumed office 23 March 2018
Constituency	Show list: Rozzano (2018–2022); Cologno Monzese (since 2022)
Member of the Chamber of Deputies
In office 23 April 1992 – 22 March 2018
Constituency	Show list: Milan–Pavia (1992–1994); Lombardy 1 (1994–2006); Liguria (2006–2008); Lombardy 1 (2008–2013); Apulia (2013–2018)

Personal details
- Born: Ignazio Benito Maria La Russa; 18 July 1947 (age 79) Paternò, Sicily, Italy
- Party: Brothers of Italy (since 2012)
- Other political affiliations: MSI (1971–1995); AN (1995–2009); PdL (2009–2012)
- Height: 1.72 m (5 ft 8 in)
- Spouse: Laura De Cicco
- Children: 3
- Education: University of Pavia

Ignazio Benito Maria La Russa (born 18 July 1947) is an Italian politician, who has been serving as president of the Senate of the Republic since 13 October 2022. He is the first politician with a neo-fascist background to hold the position of President of the Senate, the second highest-ranking office of the Italian Republic.

La Russa also served as Minister of Defence in the Berlusconi IV Cabinet from 2008 to 2011, and as Vice President of the Senate of the Republic from 2018 until 2022. Moreover, during his long-time career, he held various posts within his parties. In 2008, he became acting president of the National Alliance, which on 29 March 2009 merged into The People of Freedom, of which he was one of the three national coordinators until 17 December 2012, when he launched Brothers of Italy (FdI). From 4 April 2013 to 8 March 2014, La Russa served as president of FdI.

== Early life and family ==
Ignazio La Russa was born in Paternò, near Catania, Sicily, in 1947. His father, Antonino La Russa, served as secretary of the National Fascist Party (PNF) for Paternò during the 1940s and joined the Italian Social Movement (MSI) after the war, being elected to the Parliament several times. La Russa had two brothers, both of them involved in politics: Vincenzo, a former senator for Christian Democracy (DC), and Romano, a former member of the European Parliament for the MSI's legal successor, the National Alliance.

When he was 13, his family moved to Milan, where his father was a practising lawyer. After attending college in St. Gallen, a German-speaking Swiss canton, he obtained a degree in law at the University of Pavia. After serving as a Regular Army Reserve Officer, he has worked as a criminal defence lawyer at the Supreme Court of Cassation. He is married to Laura De Cicco and has three sons: Geronimo, Lorenzo, and Leonardo.

== Political career ==
During his youth, La Russa joined the neo-fascist Italian Social Movement (MSI), and was involved in nationalist activism in Milan. In 1971, he became one of the main leaders of the newly-formed Youth Front (FdG), the youth section of the MSI. On 12 April 1973, during a demonstration organised by the MSI against what they called "red violence", two hand grenades were thrown, one of which killed the 22-year-old policeman Antonio Marino. La Russa was accused of being one of the "moral perpetrators" of the bombings.

In the 1985 Lombard regional election, La Russa was elected regional councillor for the Milan district, gaining 24,096 votes. In the 1990 Lombard regional election, he was re-elected to the council with 13,807 votes. In 1987, La Russa became the lawyer of Sergio Ramelli's family, a young member of the MSI who was assassinated by far-leftist communist militants. Moreover, from 1989 to 1994, he was town councillor in San Donato Milanese, near Milan.

=== Member of the Parliament ===
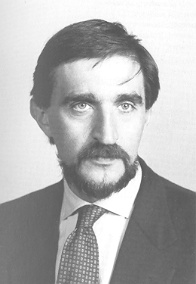
La Russa in 1992

In the 1992 Italian general election, La Russa was elected both to the Chamber of Deputies with 26,098 votes for the constituency of Milan–Pavia, and to the Senate of the Republic for the constituency of Milan II with 4,943 votes. After the election, he left the Lombardy Regional Council, and choose to be a member of the Chamber of Deputies. The electoral law of that time allowed a candidate to run for election as representative for both the Senate and the Chamber: if the candidate obtained sufficient votes to be elected to both, he had to opt for one of the two houses.

In 1994, the MSI merged with conservative factions of the former Christian Democracy and the Italian Liberal Party, forming a new party called National Alliance (AN) which was launched in 1994 but was officially founded in January 1995. Former MSI members dominated the new party, and the MSI's last leader, Gianfranco Fini, was elected the new party's first leader. Fini appointed La Russa vice president of the party. In the 1994 Italian general election, which was won by Silvio Berlusconi's centre-right coalition, La Russa was re-elected to the Chamber and appointed deputy speaker of the house.

In the 1996 Italian general election won by Romano Prodi's centre-left coalition, La Russa was re-elected to the Chamber for the single-member constituency of Milan with 41,598 votes. In the legislature, La Russa was appointed chairman of the "Committee on Parliamentary Immunity", an office he held until 2001. In the 2001 Italian general election, which was won by the centre-right, he was once again elected to the Chamber for the district of Milan 2 with 41,158 votes. On 5 June 2001, La Russa became the leader of AN's deputies, a position that he held until 8 October 2003 and again between November 2004 and July 2005. In the 2006 Italian general election, he was confirmed at the Chamber of Deputies for the constituency of Lombardy 1.

=== Minister of Defence ===
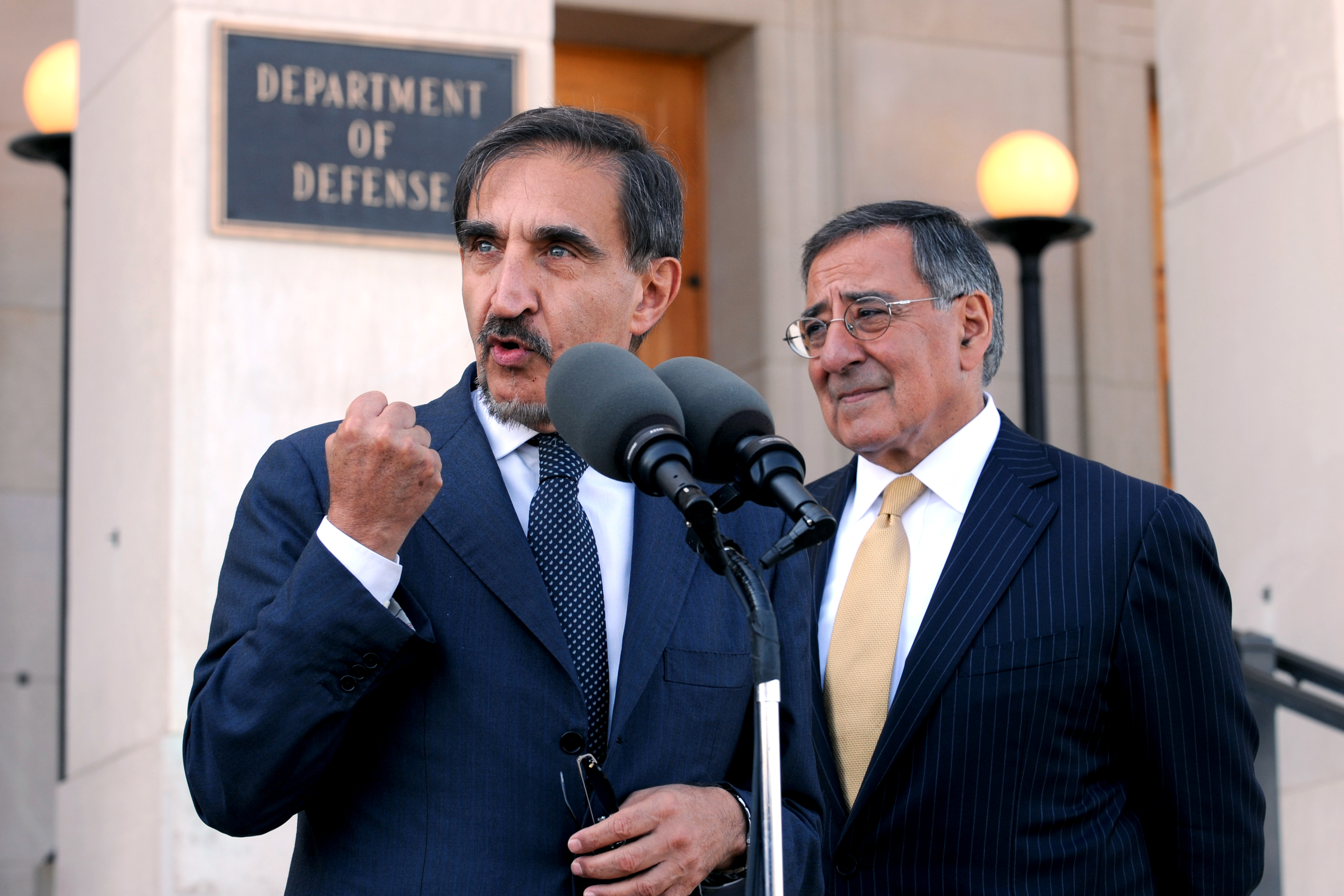
La Russa with U.S. Secretary of Defense Leon Panetta in 2011

In the run-up to the 2008 Italian general election, AN merged with Berlusconi's Forza Italia forming The People of Freedom (PdL), which La Russa joined, becoming party's national coordinator along with Sandro Bondi and Denis Verdini. On 8 May 2008, after being re-elected to the Chamber, La Russa was appointed Minister of Defence in the Berlusconi IV Cabinet, an office that he held until 16 November 2011 when Berlusconi resigned. Moreover, La Russa ran in the 2009 European Parliament election in the North-Western Italy constituency, being elected with 223,986 votes but decided to renounce his seat in favor of that in the Chamber of Deputies. In November 2009, La Russa challenged the judgement of the Lautsi v. Italy of the European Court of Human Rights, which contested the display of the crucifix in Italian classrooms. He said: "The crucifix will remain in all the classrooms. They can die, they can die, they and those fake international organizations that count for nothing." Following an appeal by Italy, the first degree judgement was finally overturned. At the end of 2009, with the 2010 financial law, La Russa launched Difesa Servizi S.p.A. a company with the aim of enhancing the defense's brand and assets.

La Russa was among the main supporters of the 2011 military intervention in Libya against the regime of Muammar Gaddafi, which was initially opposed by Prime Minister Berlusconi due to his long-time friendship with the de facto leader of Libya since 1969. Furthermore, he was in favor of a ceasefire intervention by Italy in the Russo-Georgian War. As minister, La Russa issued the law 100/2009 and established the day of remembrance for the fallen soldiers in international peacekeeping missions.

On 2 May 2009, La Russa founded Our Right, a national-conservative faction within the PdL, which was soon disbanded when he formed Protagonist Italy, along with Maurizio Gasparri.

=== Co-founder of Brothers of Italy ===
On 21 December 2012, La Russa, along with Guido Crosetto and Giorgia Meloni, founded Brothers of Italy (FdI), a national-conservative party, split from the PdL because FdI considered Berlusconi and the PdL's secretary Angelino Alfano of being too close to Mario Monti's cabinet. In the 2013 Italian general election, he was once again elected to the Chamber. Moreover, on 4 April 2013, La Russa was appointed president of FdI, a position that he held until 8 March 2014, when he was replaced by Meloni. In the 2018 Italian general election, La Russa was elected to the Senate of the Republic for the single-member district of Rozzano gaining 137,793 votes. He became vice president of the Senate on 23 March 2018.

=== President of the Senate ===
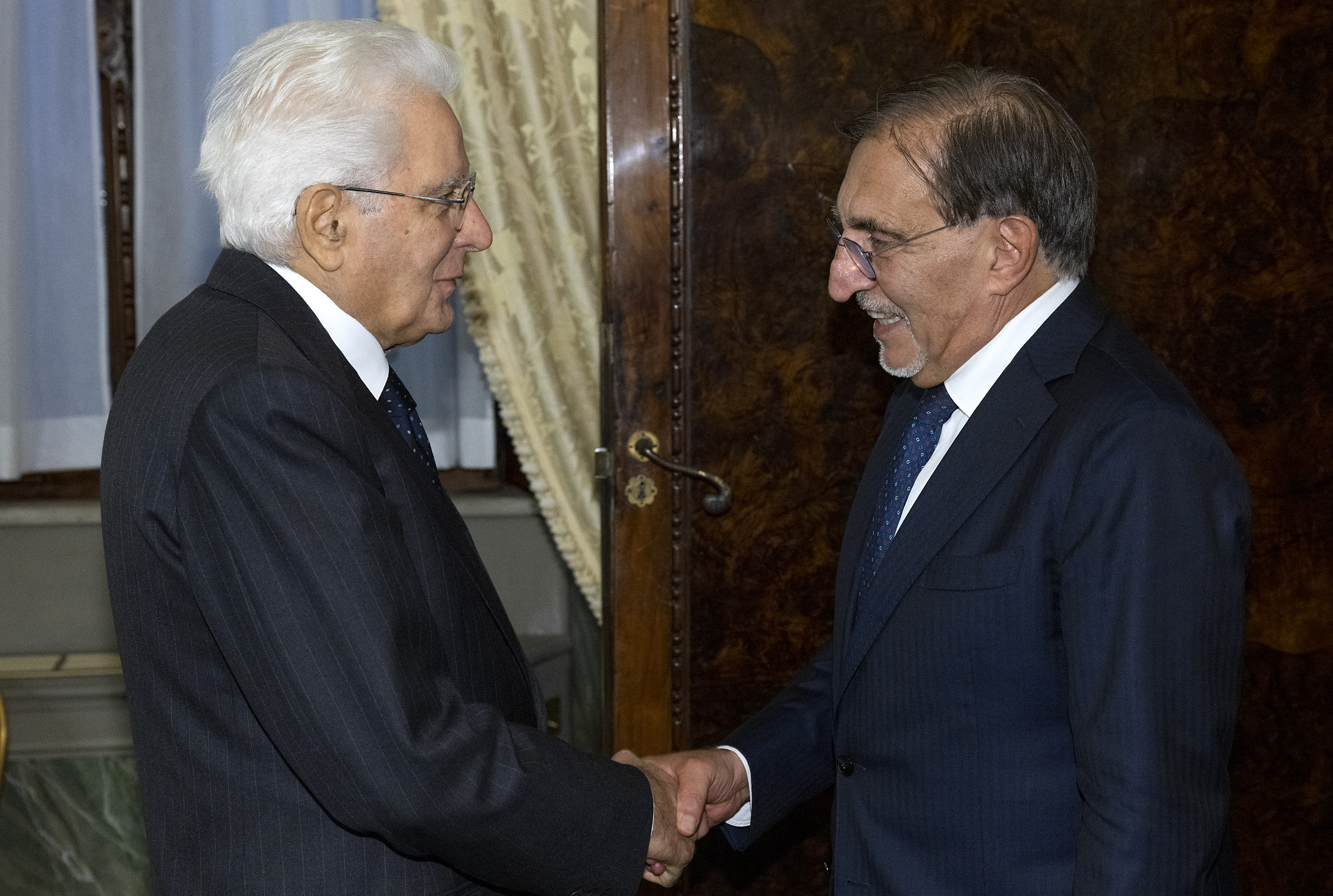
La Russa meeting President Sergio Mattarella in October 2022

The 2022 Italian general election was marked by a strong showing of FdI, which became the most voted party with 26% of votes; the centre-right coalition, led by Meloni, won an absolute majority in both houses. La Russa was re-elected to the Senate for the single-member constituency of Cologno Monzese with 239,720 votes.

On 13 October 2022, La Russa was elected President of the Senate of the Republic by obtaining 116 votes out of 206 in the first round. La Russa's candidacy was not supported by Berlusconi's Forza Italia, but he succeeded in being elected getting votes from members of the opposition parties. The first post-fascist elected to the position, La Russa was proclaimed president by Liliana Segre, a senator for life and Holocaust survivor, who presided the Senate's session due to her being the oldest senator.

On 11 December 2022, La Russa announced the proposal of a law aiming at introducing a voluntary military service for young people between 18 and 25 years old.

== Political views ==
La Russa speaking at World Travel & Tourism Council Global Summit in 2025

Often accused of being a neo-fascist politician, he has been described as far right; La Russa has described himself as a conservative.

Despite his membership of a party with neo-fascist origins and his possession of a bust of Mussolini, La Russa is a supporter of Israel and the government of Benjamin Netanyahu.

During the coronavirus outbreak of 2020, he tweeted that replacing the handshake with the Roman salute, used under the fascist regime of Mussolini, would be a useful hygiene measure. He later deleted the tweet. In February 2020, he also recommended that 25 April, the commemoration of Italy's liberation from fascism and nazism, should be replaced with a day that commemorates the victims of "all wars" and of coronavirus.

La Russa opposes adoption by gay couples as he believes this is "an unjustified incitement to grow up gay". He feels that gay couples raising children is against the "natural law".

La Russa has also expressed anti-communist views multiple times throughout his career.

== Controversies ==
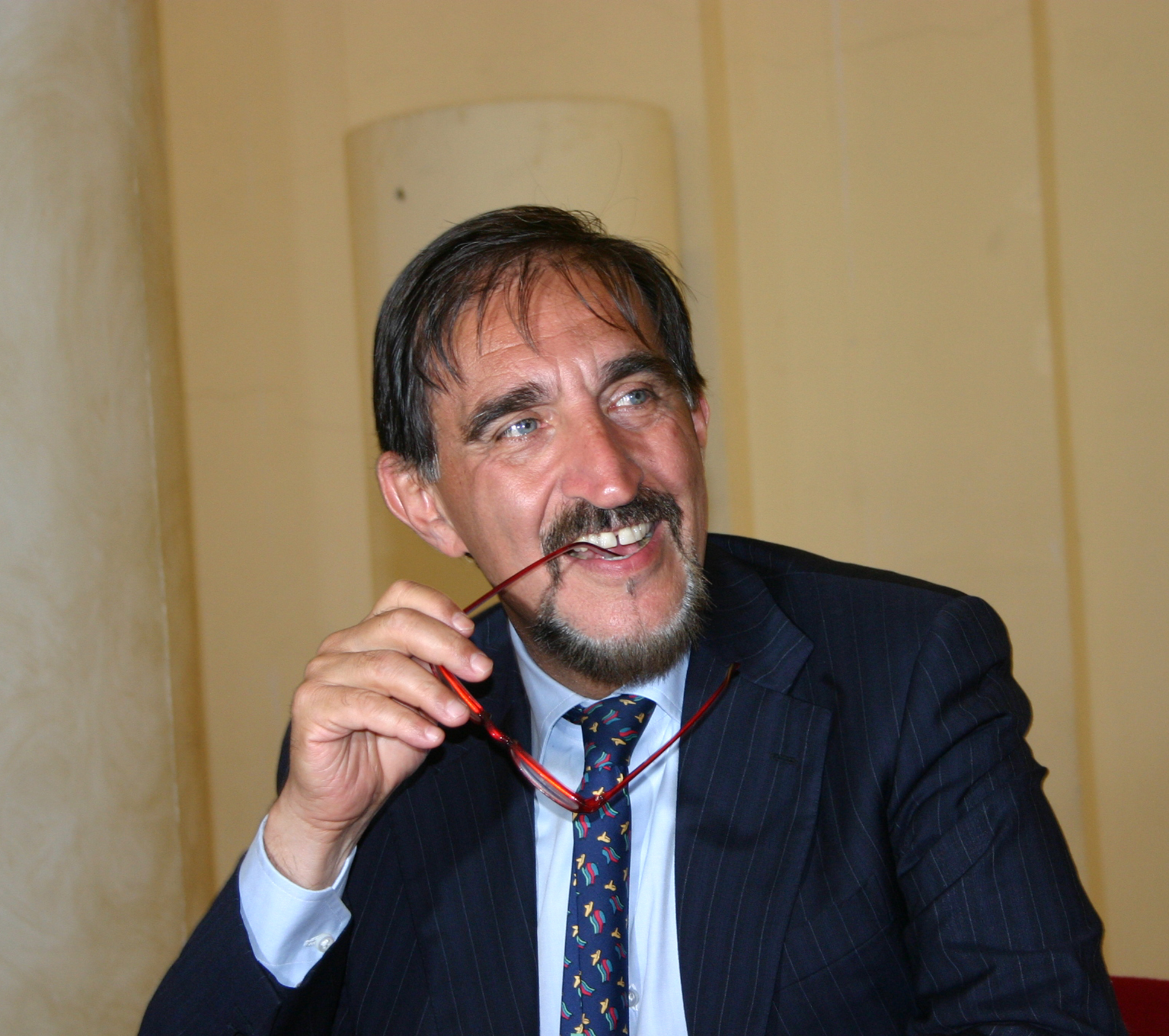
La Russa in 2007

During his long-time career, La Russa has often been the protagonist of controversies.

On 12 April 1973, La Russa, at the time the leader of the MSI’s Youth Front, led an unauthorized demonstration, in which his brother Romano also took part, organized by various neo-fascists (an event later labelled as the "Black Thursday of Milan"): the demonstration immediately descended into acts of vandalism and violence, including the occupation of a public university residence and the damaging of a high school; thirteen police officers were wounded, one by a grenade that also struck a passerby, while another grenade killed a police officer. On 25 October 2026, La Russa filed a lawsuit against historian Michela Ponzani for linking him to that demonstration, noting that he has no convictions or responsibility regarding what took place, and for her assertion that, if a "security decree" had been enacted back then, he would not have become president of the Senate.

A press conference of then Prime Minister Silvio Berlusconi held on 10 March 2010 was interrupted several times by the political activist Gian Rocco Carlomagno. La Russa, who had already invited him to leave the room, approached Carlomagno, pulling and pushing him towards the exit, while the protestor accused La Russa of being a fascist.

On 12 February 2011, La Russa kicked and insulted AnnoZero journalist Corrado Formigli, who wanted to ask him questions about Berlusconi's sex scandals. La Russa initially apologized for the statements but then accused Formigli of having kicked him in the back and Formigli was moved away by the security service. Moreover, La Russa was being investigated by Italy's Court of Audit for embezzlement in relation to the use of state flights to attend the football match between Inter Milan and Schalke 04 on 5 April 2011.

At the beginning of the COVID-19 pandemic in Italy, he had suggested on social networks to give up the unhygienic handshake to replace it with the fascist salute. During a television debate on 15 September, one week before the 2022 Italian general election, La Russa stated that "we are all heirs of the Duce." In his house in Milan, La Russa collects several statues and memorabilia of Benito Mussolini and his fascist movement, as well as photos and paintings about Italy's colonial campaigns.

Secretary of Defense Robert M. Gates, rescorts visiting Italian Defense Minister La Russa into the Pentagon in 2011

In February 2023 he declared to have given his sister a bust of Benito Mussolini that he had received by his father and which he had kept at home for several years. In March 2023, La Russa described the via Rasella attack, perpetrated by Italian partisans against Nazi occupation forces which later brought to the reprisal of Ardeatine caves, as an "inglorious event of the Italian resistance".

In July 2024, commenting on a statement by the Italian journalist Paolo Berizzi who criticised centre-left politicians for having played a charity football game with members of the right-wing government saying that "you don't play football with fascists", La Russa answered: "I would not play football with Berizzi, so we're even."

In December 2025, La Russa praised the founders of the MSI, former members of the PNF and the RSI, also recalling the continuity of the fiamma tricolore present in the symbols of MSI, AN and FdI. He also stated that "[they] thought about the future, they didn't try to overthrow by force something that, moreover, would have been impossible to overturn", although prominent members of the MSI participated in attempted coups, most notably Junio Valerio Borghese (even though he had left the party two years before the coup). This statements lead to criticisms by the opposition and ANPI.

In December 2025, a preliminary hearing judge in Milan ruled on a case involving Leonardo Apache La Russa, son of Italian Senate President Ignazio La Russa, concerning the alleged unlawful dissemination of intimate images without consent. The judge deemed a €25,000 compensation offer made by La Russa to the young woman who had filed the complaint to be adequate under Italian law and declared the offence extinguished as a result. A prior allegation of sexual assault related to the same events had already been dismissed during the investigation phase. The decision took into account a written statement from La Russa expressing regret over the incident and his willingness to meet the complainant. The woman, however, rejected the compensation and announced her intention to appeal the ruling on the adequacy of the sum.

La Russa was criticised, a few days before 25 April 2026 (Liberation Day), for his statement about the fact in the past he had gone to pay tribute both to the partisans who died during the Second World War and to the soldiers of the Italian Social Republic, and that he would do it again.

La Russa was accused, on 14 May 2026, of having made a sexist joke about other politicians, who were supposed to later report the outcome of a meeting to him: "We'll have a special session, of three [a threesome], which isn't bad with Gelmini and Carfagna."

On 13 November 2026, during a meeting with high school students in Milan, where the topic of discussion was the popular vote, La Russa stated that "The will of the people can be imperfect; after all, it was the people who wanted fascism, it was not a fascist revolution. There was the March on Rome, which was subsequently sanctified by the people. The people were wrong, but there is no remedy other than to place one's trust in the will of the people, which is the highest value in a democracy." The statement has been criticised as historically false, due to the violence perpetrated by the Fascists during those years and the coup d'état that was the March on Rome.

== Electoral history ==
Election	House	Constituency	Party	Votes	Result
1985	Regional Council of Lombardy	Milan	MSI	24,096	Elected
1990	Regional Council of Lombardy	Milan	MSI	13,807	Elected
1992	Chamber of Deputies	Milan–Pavia	MSI	26,098	Elected
1994	Chamber of Deputies	Lombardy 1 – Milan 2	AN	8,561	Not elected
1994	Chamber of Deputies	Lombardy 1	AN	– (Note: Elected in a closed list proportional representation system.)	Elected
1996	Chamber of Deputies	Lombardy 1 – Milan 2	AN	41,598	Elected
2001	Chamber of Deputies	Lombardy 1 – Milan 2	AN	41,158	Elected
2006	Chamber of Deputies	Liguria	AN	–	Elected
2008	Chamber of Deputies	Lombardy 1	PdL	–	Elected
2009	European Parliament	North-West Italy	PdL	223,986	Elected (Note: La Russa renounced to his seat and remained a member of the Chamber of Deputies.)
2013	Chamber of Deputies	Apulia	FdI	–	Elected
2018	Senate of the Republic	Lombardy 4 – Rozzano	FdI	137,793	Elected
2022	Senate of the Republic	Lombardy 2 – Cologno Monzese	FdI	239,720	Elected

== Notes ==
Party political offices
Preceded by Gianfranco Fini	President of National Alliance; Acting; 2008–2009	Position abolished
Preceded by New party	President of Brothers of Italy; 2013–2014	Succeeded by Giorgia Meloni
Political offices
Preceded by Arturo Parisi	Minister of Defence; 2008–2011	Succeeded by Giampaolo Di Paola
Preceded by Elisabetta Casellati	President of the Italian Senate; 2022–present	Incumbent
Order of precedence
Preceded by Sergio Mattarella as President of the Republic	Order of precedence of Italy; President of the Senate	Succeeded by Lorenzo Fontana as President of the Chamber of Deputies
