= Altero Matteoli =

Italian politician (1940–2017)

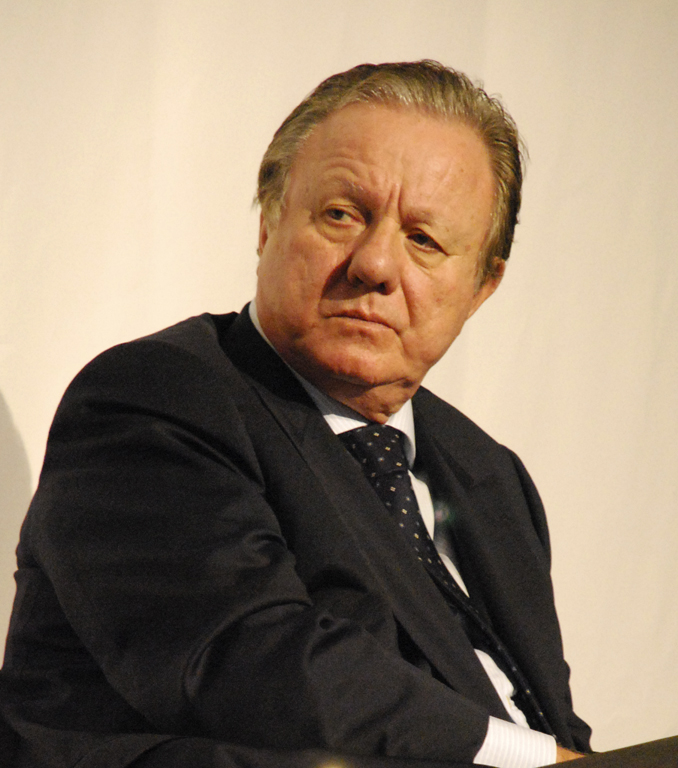

Minister of Infrastructure and Transport
- In office 7 May 2008 – 16 November 2011
- Prime Minister: Silvio Berlusconi
- Preceded by: Antonio Di Pietro (as Minister of infrastructures); Alessandro Bianchi (as Minister of transports)
- Succeeded by: Corrado Passera

Minister of the Environment
- In office 11 June 2001 – 17 May 2006
- Prime Minister: Silvio Berlusconi
- Preceded by: Willer Bordon
- Succeeded by: Alfonso Pecoraro Scanio
- In office 11 May 1994 – 17 January 1995
- Prime Minister: Silvio Berlusconi
- Preceded by: Valdo Spini
- Succeeded by: Paolo Baratta

Member of the Senate
- In office 28 April 2006 – 18 December 2017

Member of the Chamber of Deputies
- In office 12 July 1983 – 27 April 2006

Personal details
- Born: 8 September 1940 Cecina, Tuscany
- Died: 18 December 2017 (aged 77) Capalbio, Tuscany
- Party: MSI (1983–1995); AN (1995–2008); PdL (2008–2013); FI (2013–2017)
- Height: 1.77 m (5 ft 10 in)

Altero Matteoli (8 September 1940 – 18 December 2017) was an Italian politician.

== Political career ==
Born in Cecina, he has been a member of the Italian Social Movement and National Alliance. He was a member of the Chamber of Deputies from 1983 to 2006 and a Senator from 2006 to 2017.

He served as Minister of the Environment in the second and in the third Berlusconi Cabinet. He also served as Minister of Infrastructure and Transport in the fourth Berlusconi Cabinet. He has been Mayor of Orbetello from 2006 to 2011.

He died in a car accident on 18 December 2017.
