= National Alliance (Italy) =

Conservative political party in Italy

National Alliance Alleanza Nazionale
- Abbreviation: AN
- Leader: Gianfranco Fini (first); Ignazio La Russa (last)
- Founded: 22 January 1994 (as an organisation); 27 January 1995 (as a party)
- Dissolved: 22 March 2009
- Preceded by: Italian Social Movement
- Merged into: The People of Freedom
- Succeeded by: Brothers of Italy (Note: FdI was founded by former AN members, and is the current bearer of its symbol with the authorization of the National Alliance Foundation)
- Newspaper: Secolo d'Italia
- Student wing: Student Action
- Youth wing: Youth Action
- Membership (2004): 250,000
- Ideology: National conservatism; Conservatism; Post-fascism
- Political position: Right-wing to far-right
- National affiliation: Pole of Good Government (1994); Pole for Freedoms (1996–2001); House of Freedoms (2001–2008)
- European affiliation: Alliance for Europe of the Nations
- European Parliament group: Union for Europe of the Nations

National Alliance (Italian: Alleanza Nazionale, AN) was a national conservative political party in Italy. It was the successor of the Italian Social Movement (MSI), a neo-fascist party founded in 1946 by former followers of Benito Mussolini that had moderated its policies over its last decades and finally distanced itself from its former ideology, a move known as post-fascismo, during a convention in Fiuggi by dissolving into the new party in 1995.

Gianfranco Fini was the leader of AN from its foundation through 2008, after being elected President of the Chamber of Deputies. Fini was succeeded by Ignazio La Russa, who managed the merger of the party with Forza Italia (FI) into The People of Freedom (PdL) in 2009. During AN's last congress, it was decided that a foundation would manage the assets and the political legacy of MSI/AN; as a result, the National Alliance Foundation was established in 2011. A group of former AN members, led by La Russa and Giorgia Meloni, as well as former Christian Democrat Guido Crosetto, left the PdL in 2012 to launch the Brothers of Italy (FdI), while others remained in the PdL and were among the founding members of the re-launched Forza Italia (FI) in 2013. The National Alliance Foundation authorised FdI to use AN's symbol in 2014 and onwards.

== History ==
=== Foundation ===
National Alliance was launched in 1994 when the Italian Social Movement (MSI), the former neo-fascist party, merged with conservative elements of the former Christian Democracy, which had disbanded in 1994 after two years of scandals and various splits due to political corruption at its highest levels, exposed by the Mani pulite investigation, and the Italian Liberal Party, disbanded in the same year. It was officially launched in January 1995. Former MSI members dominated the new party, and the MSI's last leader, Gianfranco Fini, was elected the new party's first leader.

The AN logo followed a template very similar to that of the Democratic Party of the Left, incorporating the MSI logo in a small roundel of the AN logo as a means of legally preventing others from using it. The name was suggested by an article on the Italian newspaper Il Tempo written in 1992 by Domenico Fisichella, a prominent conservative academic. Starting in the 1990s, the MSI gradually transformed into a mainstream right-wing party, culminating in its 1995 dissolution into AN.

=== Government participation ===
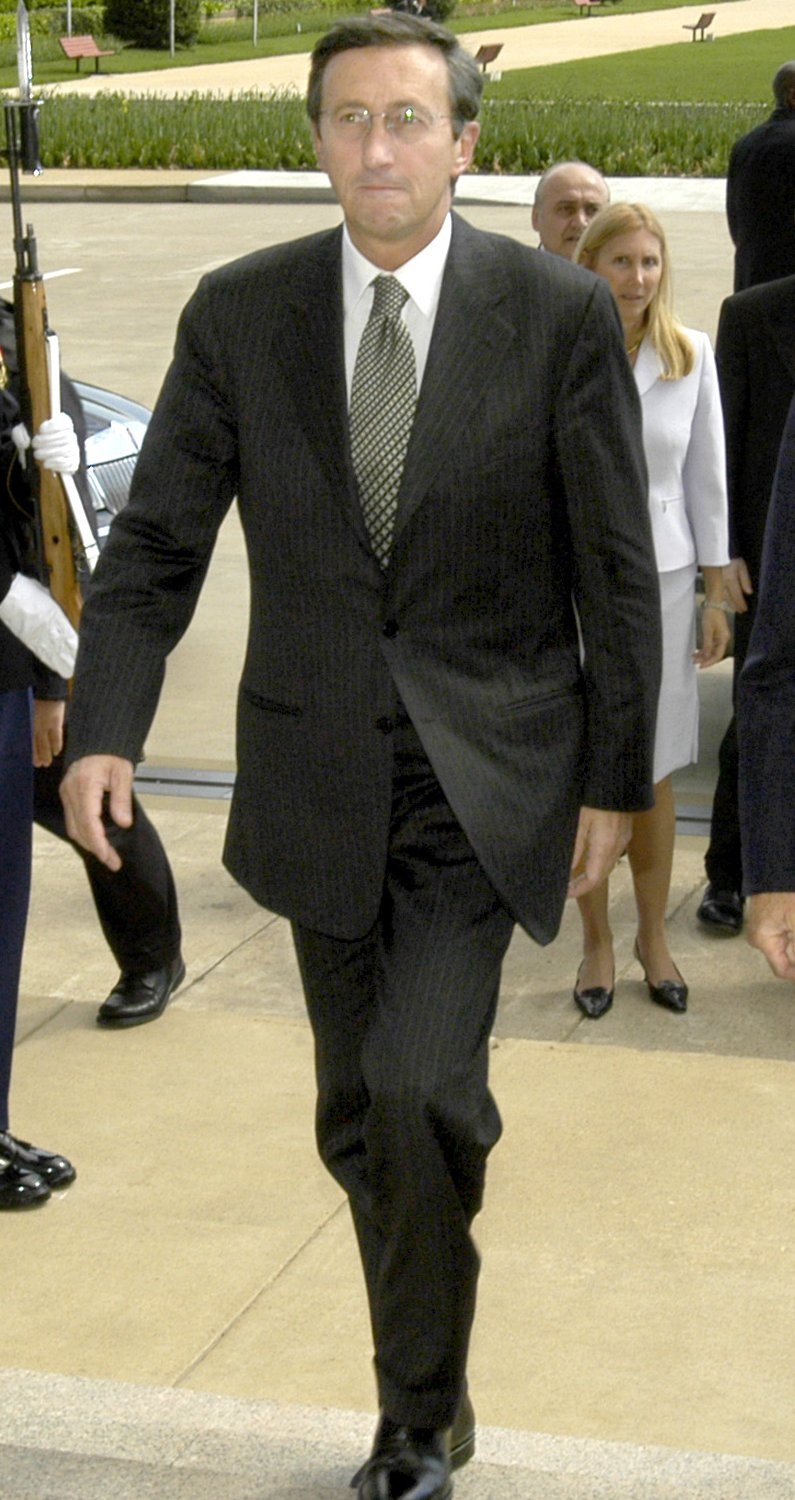
Gianfranco Fini in 2004

The party was part of all three House of Freedoms coalition governments led by Silvio Berlusconi. Fini was nominated Deputy Prime Minister after the 2001 Italian general election and was Foreign Minister from November 2004 to May 2006.

When Fini visited Israel in late November 2003 in the function of Italian Deputy Prime Minister, he labelled the racial laws issued by the Italian fascism regime in 1938 as "infamous", as also Giorgio Almirante, historic leader of MSI, had done before. He also referred to the Italian Social Republic as belonging to the most shameful pages of the past, and considered fascism part of an era of "absolute evil", something which was hardly acceptable to the few remaining hardliners of the party. As a result, Alessandra Mussolini, the granddaughter of the former fascist dictator Benito Mussolini, who had been at odds with the party on a number of issues for a long time, and some hardliners left the party and formed Social Action.

In occasion of the 2006 Italian general election, AN ran within the House of Freedoms, with new allies. The centre-right lost by 24,000 votes in favour of the centre-left coalition The Union. Individually, AN received nearly 5 million votes, amounting to 12.3%. In July 2007, a group of splinters led by Francesco Storace formed The Right, which was officially founded on 10 November. Seven MPs of AN, including Teodoro Buontempo and Daniela Santanchè, joined the new party.

=== The People of Freedom ===
In November 2007, Silvio Berlusconi announced that Forza Italia would have soon merged or transformed into The People of Freedom (PdL) party.

After the sudden fall of the Prodi II Cabinet in January 2008, the break-up of The Union and the subsequent political crisis which led to a fresh general election, Berlusconi hinted that Forza Italia would have probably contested its last election and the new party would have been officially founded only after that election. In an atmosphere of reconciliation with Gianfranco Fini, Berlusconi also stated that the new party could see the participation of other parties. Finally, on 8 February, Berlusconi and Fini agreed to form a joint list under the PdL banner, allied with Lega Nord (LN). After the victory of the PdL in the 2008 Italian general election, AN was merged into the PdL in early 2009.

During AN's last congress, it was decided that a foundation would manage the assets and the political legacy of MSI/AN; as a result, in 2011 the National Alliance Foundation was established. In 2014 the Foundation, which has been successively led by Franco Pontone, Franco Mugnai and Giuseppe Valentino, gave the Brothers of Italy (FdI), a political party formed by former AN members who had splintered from the PdL and who were led by La Russa and Giorgia Meloni, the authorisation to use AN's symbol. Former AN members have since been active in several parties, but mostly in FdI, however the Foundation continues to have former AN members of all ideological stripes in its ranks, including those who are now members of the new Forza Italia, the new Lega and the most-recently formed Independence.

== Ideology ==
National Alliance's political programme emphasised:

- traditional values, being often close to the position of the Catholic Church, despite some social liberal and secular attitudes;
- law and order, especially laws aimed at controlling immigration and implementing punishment;
- support for Israel, the United States and European integration;
- prohibition of all drugs, including marijuana.

Distinguishing itself from the MSI, the party distanced itself from Benito Mussolini and fascism, and made efforts to improve relations with Jewish groups. For example, after far-right skinheads celebrated the then-AN politician Gianni Alemanno's election as Mayor of Rome in 2008 by making the Roman salute outside the Palazzo Senatorio, Alemanno visited Rome Synagogue, where he gave a speech praising what he called the universal values of the fight against Nazism. The shift was also present in the rhetoric of the party's leader Fini, who went from declaring himself as "fascist for the 2000s" in 1987 when at the head of the MSI, to describing himself as a conservative at the time of the AN's launch in 1994. With most hardliners leaving the party, it sought to present itself as a respectable conservative party and to join forces with Forza Italia in the European People's Party and eventually in a united party of the centre-right. Historian David Broder has compared the AN to the People's Party in Spain, a post-Francisco Franco party.

Although the party approved the market economy and held favourable views on liberalisation and the privatisation of state-owned companies, AN was to the left of Forza Italia on economic issues and sometimes supported statist policies. That is why the party was strong in Rome and Lazio, where most civil servants live. The implosion of the Christian Democrats created space for a more economically interventionist party of the conservative right, and the AN sought closer ties to the former DC factions that joined the Berlusconi-led alliances of the right. As part of this, it also moderated its stances on the European Union and immigration, both of which were conditionally accepted by the party's leadership. Moreover, AN presented itself as a party promoting national cohesion, national identity, and patriotism.

Regarding institutional reforms, the party was a long-time supporter of presidentialism and a plurality voting system, and came to support also federalism and to fully accept the alliance with Lega Nord, although the relations with that party were tense at times, especially about issues regarding national unity.

Fini, a moderniser who saw Nicolas Sarkozy and David Cameron as role-models, impressed an ambitious political line to the party, combining the pillars of conservative ideology like security, family values, and patriotism with a more progressive approach in other areas, such as stem cell research and supporting voting rights for legal aliens. Some of these positions were not shared by many members of the party, most of whom staunchly opposed stem cell research and artificial insemination.

== Factions ==
National Alliance was a heterogeneous political party and within it members were divided in different factions, some of them very organised:

- Protagonist Right (Destra Protagonista), headed by Maurizio Gasparri and Ignazio La Russa, was the bigger faction and the closest to Forza Italia due to its liberal-conservative stances.
- New Alliance (Nuova Alleanza), formerly called Right and Freedom (Destra e Libertà), headed by Altero Matteoli and Adolfo Urso, was formed by the staunchest supporters of Gianfranco Fini within the party and supported a liberal political agenda.
- Social Right (Destra Sociale), led by Gianni Alemanno, advocated a more social approach to economic policy and was considered at the right of the party. It had close ties with the General Labour Union.
- D-Destra, led by Francesco Storace, was the most conservative component of the party, proud of the MSI's tradition and in open opposition to Fini. Formed as a split from the Social Right, the group finally left AN and launched The Right in July 2007.
- Christian Reformists (Cristiano Riformisti) was a minor Christian-democratic faction.

In the party there was also a group named Ethic-Religious Council, whose board members included Gaetano Rebecchini (founder, ex-DC), Riccardo Pedrizzi (president), Franco Tofoni (vice-president), Luigi Gagliardi (secretary-general), Alfredo Mantovano, Antonio Mazzocchi, and Riccardo Migliori. This was not a faction but an official organism within the party and expressed the official position of the party on ethical and religious matters. Sometimes the group criticised Fini for his liberal views on abortion, artificial insemination, and stem-cell research, which led some notable ex-DC members as Publio Fiori to leave the party. Some members of the council, such as Pedrizzi and Mantovano, were described as members of an unofficial Catholic Right faction.

== Popular support ==
The party had roughly 10–15% support across Italy, having its strongholds in Central Italy, as well as Southern Italy (Lazio 18.6%, Umbria 15.2%, Marche 14.3%, Abruzzo 14.3%, Apulia 13.2%, Sardinia 12.9%, Tuscany 12.6%, and Campania 12.6% in the 2006 Italian general election), scoring badly in Lombardy (10.2%) and Sicily (10.9%), while competing in the North-East (Friuli-Venezia Giulia 15.5% and Veneto 11.3%).

The party had a good showing in the first general election in which it took part, achieving 13.5% of the popular vote in 1994 Italian general election. In the 1996 Italian general election, when Fini tried for the first time to replace Silvio Berlusconi as leader of the centre-right, the party grew its support to 15.7%. From that moment the party suffered an electoral decline but remained the third force of Italian politics.

In the 2006 Italian general election, the final election in which the party participated on its own account, AN won 12.3% of the vote, securing 71 seats in the Chamber of Deputies and 41 in the Senate. In the 2008 Italian general election, the party had 90 deputies (excluding Fiamma Nirenstein, Alessandro Ruben, and Souad Sbai, whose election was supported both by Forza Italia and National Alliance), and 48 senators, who were elected as part of a joint election list under the banner of The People of Freedom.

The electoral results of National Alliance in general (Chamber of Deputies) and European Parliament elections since 1994 are shown in the chart below.

View source data.

The electoral results of National Alliance in the 10 most populated regions of Italy are shown in the table below.

	1994 general	1995 regional	1996 general	1999 European	2000 regional	2001 general	2004 European	2005 regional	2006 general
Piedmont	8.3	11.2	12.1	7.5	11.9	9.2	8.8	9.5	11.8
Lombardy	5.8	10.0	9.0	6.0	9.7	8.6	7.2	8.7	10.2
Veneto	7.7	10.7	11.7	8.3	9.8	8.5	9.0	8.1	11.3
Emilia-Romagna	9.0	10.3	11.5	8.6	11.4	9.7	8.4	8.9	10.2
Tuscany	10.9	13.1	15.8	10.9	14.9	13.0	10.9	10.9	12.6
Lazio	25.3	24.5	28.9	20.3	23.1	20.4	18.4	23.9 (Note: Combined result of National Alliance (16.9%) and Lista Storace (7.0%), which was the personal list of AN regional leader Francesco Storace.)	18.6
Campania	20.3	18.3	18.7	10.7	11.2	13.1	13.2	10.6	12.6
Apulia	27.5 (Note: Forza Italia failed to present a list and thus most centre-right voters voted for National Alliance.)	20.4	17.9	12.7	15.5	15.3	16.0	12.1	13.2
Calabria	17.2	16.3	23.4	10.2	10.4	15.2	15.5	9.9	11.0
Sicily	14.0	14.1 (1996)	16.4	12.1	11.3 (2001)	10.7	14.5	10.6 (2006)	10.9
ITALY	13.5	-	15.7	10.3	-	12.0	11.3	-	12.3

== Election results ==
=== Italian Parliament ===
Election	Leader	Chamber of Deputies					Senate of the Republic				
Election	Leader	Votes	%	Seats	+/–	Position	Votes	%	Seats	+/–	Position
1994	Gianfranco Fini	5,214,133	13.5	109 / 630	▲109	▲3rd	into PBG		48 / 315	▲48	–
1996	Gianfranco Fini	5,870,491	15.7	93 / 630	▼17	3rd	into PpL		43 / 315	▼5	–
2001	Gianfranco Fini	4,463,205	12.0	99 / 630	▲7	▼5th	into CdL		45 / 315	▲2	–
2006	Gianfranco Fini	4,706,654	12.3	71 / 630	▼18	▲3rd	4,234,693	12.2	41 / 315	▼4	▲3rd

=== European Parliament ===
Election	Leader	Votes	%	Seats	+/–	Position	EP Group
1994	Gianfranco Fini	4,108,670	12.5	11 / 87	▲11	▲3rd	NI
1999	Gianfranco Fini	3,202,895	10.3	9 / 87	▼2	3rd	UEN
2004	Gianfranco Fini	3,736,606	11.5	9 / 78	0	3rd	UEN

== Leadership ==
- President: Gianfranco Fini (1995–2008), Ignazio La Russa (acting, 2008–2009)
  - Coordinator: Maurizio Gasparri (1995–1998), Ignazio La Russa (2003–2005)
  - Spokesman: Francesco Storace (1995–1997), Adolfo Urso (1997–2001), Antonio Landolfi (2001–2005), Andrea Ronchi (2005–2009)
  - Head of Political Secretariat: Donato Lamorte (1995–2002), Andrea Ronchi (2002–2004), Carmelo Briguglio (2002–2004), Donato Lamorte (2004–2009)
- President of National Assembly: Domenico Fisichella (1995–2005), Marcello Perina (2005–2006), Francesco Servello (2006–2009)
- Organizational Coordinator: Giuseppe Tatarella (1995–1998), Altero Matteoli (1998–2002), Donato Lamorte (2002–2004), Italo Bocchino (2004–2005), Marco Martinelli (2005–2009)
- Administrative Secretary: Francesco Pontone (1995–2009)
- Party Leader at the Chamber of Deputies: Raffaele Valensise (1994–1995), Giuseppe Tatarella (1995–1998), Gustavo Selva (1998–2001), Ignazio La Russa (2001–2003), Gian Franco Anedda (2003–2004), Ignazio La Russa (2004–2008), Italo Bocchino (deputy-leader of PdL's group, 2008–2009)
- Party Leader at the Senate: Giulio Maceratini (1994–2001), Domenico Nania (2001–2006), Altero Matteoli (2006–2008), Maurizio Gasparri (leader of PdL's group, 2008–2009)
- Party Leader at the European Parliament: Cristiana Muscardini (1994–2004), Roberta Angelilli (2004–2009)

== Symbols ==
1995–2009

2006 general election

== See also ==
- List of political parties in Italy
