= Lazio 2 (Chamber of Deputies constituency) =

- Chamber of Deputies; Electoral constituency
- Region: Lazio
- Electorate: 1,502,774 (2018)
- Major settlements: Frosinone, Latina, Rieti, Viterbo

Current constituency
- Created: 1993
- Seats: 20
- Members: M5S (6); Lega (4); FI (4); FdI (4); PD (2)

Lazio 2 is one of the 29 constituencies (Italian: circoscrizioni) represented in the Chamber of Deputies, the lower house of the Italian parliament. The constituency currently elects 20 deputies. Its boundaries correspond to those of the provinces of Frosinone, Latina, Rieti and Viterbo, within the Lazio region. The electoral system uses a parallel voting system, which act as a mixed system, with 37% of seats allocated using a first-past-the-post electoral system and 61% using a proportional method, with one round of voting.

The constituency was first established by the Mattarella law on 4 August 1993 and later confirmed by the Calderoli law on 21 December 2005 and by the Rosato law on 3 November 2017.

== Members of the Parliament ==
=== 2018–present ===
Single-member districts
District			Deputy	Coalition	Party
N.	Name	Map	Deputy	Coalition	Party
01	Viterbo		Mauro Rotelli	Centre-right	Brothers of Italy
02	Velletri		Alessandro Battilocchio	Centre-right	Forza Italia
03	Rieti		Paolo Trancassini	Centre-right	Brothers of Italy
04	Frosinone		Francesco Zicchieri	Centre-right	League
05	Cassino		Ilaria Fontana	Five Star Movement	
06	Terracina		Paolo Barelli	Centre-right	Forza Italia
07	Latina		Chiara Colosimo	Centre-right	Brothers of Italy

Multi-member districts
District			Party	Deputy
N.	Name	Map	Party	Deputy
01	Lazio 2 – 01		Five Star Movement	Marta Grande
01	Lazio 2 – 01		Five Star Movement	Gabriele Lorenzoni
01	Lazio 2 – 01		League	Filippo Maturi
01	Lazio 2 – 01		Forza Italia	Renata Polverini
01	Lazio 2 – 01		Democratic Party	Fabio Melilli
01	Lazio 2 – 01		Brothers of Italy	Francesco Lollobrigida
02	Lazio 2 – 02		Five Star Movement	Luca Frusone
02	Lazio 2 – 02		Five Star Movement	Raffaele Trano
02	Lazio 2 – 02		Five Star Movement	Enrica Segneri
02	Lazio 2 – 02		League	Claudio Durigon
02	Lazio 2 – 02		League	Francesca Gerardi
02	Lazio 2 – 02		Forza Italia	Patrizia Marrocco
02	Lazio 2 – 02		Democratic Party	Claudio Mancini
