= Po River District Basin Authority =

- Autorità di bacino distrettuale del fiume Po
- Abbreviation: AdbPo
- Formation: 18 May 1989 (public body); 25 October 2016 (basin authority)
- Type: Basin authority
- Purpose: Maintenance and protection of the Po river
- Headquarters: 75 Giuseppe Garibaldi, Parma, Province of Parma, Emilia-Romagna
- Affiliations: Ministry of Ecological Transition
- Website: adbpo.it

The Po River District Basin Authority (Italian: Autorità di bacino distrettuale del fiume Po)—formerly the Po River Basin Authority (Autorità di bacino del fiume Po) and abbreviated AdbPo—is a statutory corporation responsible for the maintenance of the Po river and tributaries in Italy's sovereign territory. Established via decree on 18 May 1989, the public body is a basin authority sponsored by the Ministry of Ecological Transition. It was declared a basin authority on 25 October 2016 by the erstwhile Ministry for Environment, Land and Sea Protection.
