= Marco Cerreto =

Italian politician (born 1971)

Member of the Chamber of Deputies
- Incumbent
- Assumed office 13 October 2022
- Constituency: Campania 2

National secretary of the National Movement for Sovereignty
- In office 7 July 2019 – 7 December 2019
- President: Roberto Menia
- Preceded by: Gianni Alemanno
- Succeeded by: Position abolished

Personal details
- Born: 1 January 1971 (age 55)
- Party: FdI (2019–present)
- Other political affiliations: MNS (until 2019)

Marco Cerreto (born 1 January 1971) is an Italian politician of Brothers of Italy who was elected member of the Chamber of Deputies in 2022. He served as national secretary of the National Movement for Sovereignty until its merger with Brothers of Italy in 2019.
