= National Movement for Sovereignty =

National Movement for Sovereignty Movimento Nazionale per la Sovranità
- Secretary: Marco Cerreto
- President: Roberto Menia
- Founded: 18 February 2017
- Dissolved: 7 December 2019
- Merger of: National Action; The Right
- Merged into: Brothers of Italy
- Headquarters: Via Giovanni Paisiello 40, Rome, Italy
- Youth wing: Identitary Youth
- Ideology: Souverainism; Euroscepticism; Neo-fascism
- Political position: Right-wing to far-right
- Colours: Dark blue

Website
- www.movimento-nazionale.it

The National Movement for Sovereignty (Italian: Movimento Nazionale per la Sovranità, MNS) was a souvereigntist and neo-fascist political party in Italy, founded on 18 February 2017, with the merger of National Action and The Right. Its founders were Gianni Alemanno and Francesco Storace, both former ministers and former leaders of the two founding parties, respectively.

The MNS had his powerbase in Lazio, the region of Rome and a traditional stronghold of Italian right-wing parties: Alemanno served as mayor of Rome (2008–2013), Storace as President of Lazio (2000–2005).

The party was finally merged into Brothers of Italy in December 2019.

== History ==
The roots of the MNS can be traced in the tradition of the Italian Social Movement (MSI), the party of the neo-fascist right, and its successor, National Alliance (AN), launched in 1993 and established in 1995. Both National Action and The Right are heirs of that tradition. The latter was founded in 2007 by former President of Lazio Francesco Storace, who opposed the merger of National Alliance into The People of Freedom, while National Action was launched in 2015 by former mayor of Rome Gianni Alemanno. Both Alemanno and Storace hailed from the Social Right faction of the defunct National Alliance.

During its founding congress in February 2017, the MNS elected Alemanno secretary and Storace president. The party aimed at forming a broad "Sovereignitist Pole" with the Northern League (LN), Brothers of Italy, Direction Italy, and others. However, Brothers of Italy did not take part to the MNS' founding congress, despite being invited.

In the run-up of the 2018 general election the party endorsed Matteo Salvini and the LN, which was restyled as "League". As a result, the MNS had a few candidates in League's lists. However, Storace disagreed with Alemanno on them and on which candidate the party should endorse in the regional election in Lazio: the former favoured right-wing independent Sergio Pirozzi, the latter the official centre-right candidate Stefano Parisi. When Storace resigned from president, Alemanno tried to mind fences (the role of president remained temporarily vacant), but also led the party to officially support Parisi. Storace denounced that the episode had marked his "definitive imcompatibility with the MNS". Claudio Barbaro of the MNS was elected senator under the agreement between the party and the League. In May 2018, Roberto Menia replaced Storace, who had left the party, as MNS president.

In March 2019, after being sentenced in the Mafia Capitale trial, Alemanno resigned as secretary of the MNS.

In the 2019 European Parliament election the MNS presented its candidates on the lists of Brothers of Italy (FdI). Subsequently, in June 2019, the MNS formed a federative pact with FdI. In July 2019 Marco Cerreto was elected new secretary of the MNS. In December 2019 the MNS was finally merged into FdI.

== Founding parties ==
Party	Ideology	Leader
National Action	National conservatism	Gianni Alemanno
The Right	National conservatism	Francesco Storace

Additionally, a number of associations and local groups joined the MNS.

== Leadership ==
- Secretary: Gianni Alemanno (2017–2019), Marco Cerreto (2019)
- President: Francesco Storace (2017–2018), Roberto Menia (2018–2019)
  - Deputy Secretary: Roberto Menia (2017–2018)
  - Spokesperson: Marco Cerreto (2018–2019)
  - Organisational Secretary: Roberto Buonasorte (2017–2018), Felice Costini (2018–2019)
- Coordinator of the National Board: Giuseppe Scopelliti (2017–2019)
- President of the College of Guarantee: Livio Proietti (2017–2019)
- Guarantors: Domenico Nania (2017–2019), Paolo Agostinacchio (2017–2018), Francesco Bevilacqua (2018–2019)
