= Carla Ruocco =

Italian politician (born 1973)

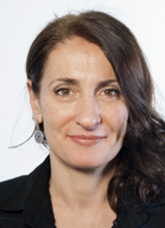
- Ruocco in 2018

Member of the Chamber of Deputies
- In office 15 March 2013 – 13 October 2022
- Constituency: Lazio 1

President of the 6th Finance Committee
- In office 21 June 2018 – 14 February 2020
- Preceded by: Maurizio Bernardo
- Succeeded by: Raffaele Trano

Personal details
- Born: 28 July 1973 (age 53) Naples, Italy
- Party: Five Star Movement (until 2022); Civic Commitment (2022)
- Education: University of Naples Federico II
- Occupation: Tax official

Carla Ruocco (born 28 July 1973) is an Italian politician from the Five Star Movement who served in the Chamber of Deputies from 2013 to 2022. She also served as president of the 6th Finance Committee.
