= Social Right =

Social Right may refer to:

- Social Right (faction), a faction within National Alliance
- Social Right (political party), a political party led by Luca Romagnoli
