= Ministry of Ecological Transition =

Ministry of the Ecological Transition may refer to:

- Ministry of the Ecological Transition (France)
- Ministry of the Ecological Transition (Italy)
- Ministry for the Ecological Transition and the Demographic Challenge (Spain)
