= Massimo Ruspandini =

Italian politician (born 1973)

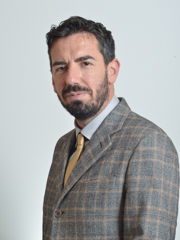
- Ruspandini in 2018

Member of the Chamber of Deputies
- Incumbent
- Assumed office 13 October 2022
- Constituency: Lazio 2

Member of the Senate of the Republic
- In office 23 March 2018 – 12 October 2022
- Constituency: Lazio

Personal details
- Born: 20 June 1973 (age 53)
- Party: Brothers of Italy

Massimo Ruspandini (born 20 June 1973) is an Italian politician of Brothers of Italy who was elected member of the Chamber of Deputies in 2022. He previously served in the Senate of the Republic from 2018 to 2022.

== Biography ==
Born in Ceccano, where his father served as a city council member, even though he came from a family of Italian Communist Party activists, he began his political activism with the Italian Social Movement, and then, following Gianfranco Fini’s “Fiuggi Turn,” joined the National Alliance (AN), with which he ran for the Ceccano City Council in the 2002 municipal elections in Lazio, appearing on AN’s ballot in support of the center-right mayoral candidate Luca Giovannone, and was elected city councilor.

In the 2004 local elections, he ran for the Province of Frosinone on the AN ticket in the Ceccano I district in support of the center-right candidate for provincial president, Paolo Fanelli, where he received 15.17% of the vote but was not elected.
