= Ilaria Fontana =

Italian politician

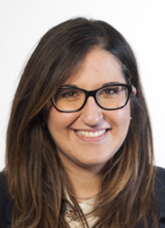
- Ilaria Fontana in 2018

Undersecretary of State at the Ministry of Ecological Transition
- In office 1 March 2021 – 22 October 2022

Member of the Chamber of Deputies of Italy
- Incumbent
- Assumed office 23 March 2018
- Constituency: Lazio 2

Personal details
- Born: 26 June 1984 (age 42) Italy
- Party: Five Star Movement

Ilaria Fontana (born 26 June 1984) is an Italian politician from the Five Star Movement. She is a member of the Chamber of Deputies and was Undersecretary of State at the Ministry of the Ecological Transition in the Draghi Government.

== Biography ==
An activist with the Five Star Movement since its founding, she ran for city council in Frosinone in the 2012 municipal elections but was not elected.

In the 2013 Italian regional elections in Lazio, she ran as a candidate for regional councilor for the Province of Frosinone on the M5S ticket, receiving 2,615 votes but failing to win a seat.

In the 2018 Italian general election, she was elected to the Chamber of Deputies in the single-member district of Cassino as a candidate for the Five Star Movement, receiving 37.81% of the vote and narrowly defeating Mario Abbruzzese of the center-right (37.68%) and Gianrico Ranaldi of the center-left (18.57%).During the 18th Legislature, she served on the Environment Committee.

On February 24, 2021, she was appointed Undersecretary at the Ministry of the Environment and Protection of Land and Sea in the new Draghi government.

In the 2022 Italian general election, she ran again for the Chamber of Deputies as a candidate for the Five Star Movement in the single-member district of Lazio 2 - 04 (Frosinone), where she received 16.61% of the vote and was defeated by Massimo Ruspandini of the center-right (54.54%) and Andrea Turriziani of the center-left (18.47%); she also ran as the lead candidate in the Lazio 2 - 02 multi-member district, where she was elected.

Since spring 2023, she has served as the provincial coordinator of the M5S in Frosinone; since the fall of that same year, she has been a member of the national “Pianeta 2050” committee, an internal M5S platform that focuses on environmental, agricultural, and food policies, as well as animal protection.

== See also ==
- List of members of the Italian Chamber of Deputies, 2018–2022
- List of members of the Italian Chamber of Deputies, 2022–
