= Paolo Trancassini =

Italian politician

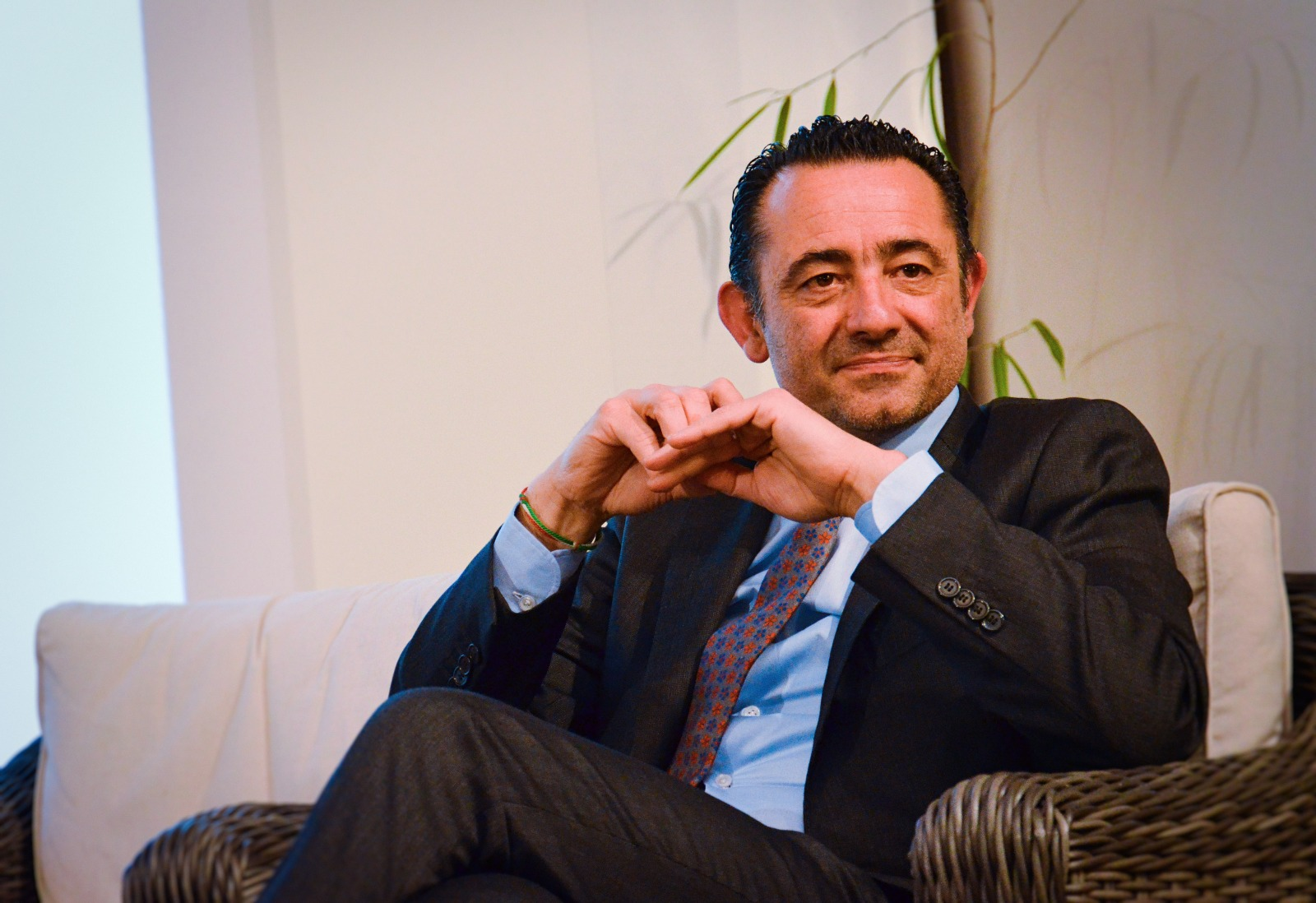

Mayor of Leonessa
- In office 24 April 1995 – 13 June 2004
- Succeeded by: Alfredo Rauco

Deputy of the Italian Republic
- Incumbent
- Assumed office 23 March 2018

Personal details
- Born: 29 June 1963 (age 63) Rome, Italy
- Party: FdI (since 2012); MSI (until 1995); AN (1995–2009); PdL (2009–2012)
- Education: Sapienza University of Rome
- Occupation: Politician

Paolo Trancassini (born 29 June 1963 in Rome, Italy) is an Italian politician and has been a member of the Chamber of Deputies representing Brothers of Italy since 2018.

== Biography ==
Born in Rome to a family of restaurateurs originally from Leonessa in the province of Rieti, he spent his formative years shuttling between the capital city and his hometown, where he assumed an administrative role at a very young age.

He earned his diploma from the "Virgilio" State Classical High School in Rome and later graduated in Law from Sapienza University of Rome.

After completing his studies, he entered the legal profession, ultimately achieving the position of an attorney authorized to represent clients before the Court of cassation. At the same time, he carries on the management of the historic family business, La Campana restaurant in Rome's Campo Marzio district.

=== Political career ===
From 1990 to 1995, he served as the Deputy Mayor of the municipality of Leonessa with the Italian Social Movement-National Right (Italian: Movimento Sociale Italiano-Destra Nazionale). Then, from 1995 to 2004, he held the position of Mayor of the town for two terms, after which he returned as a municipal councilor. In 2009, he was once again elected as the Mayor of the municipality, securing 51.46% of the votes, and he was re-elected in the 2014 elections with 58.10% of the vote.

In the 2009 municipal elections, he was also elected as a councilor for the province of Rieti in the Leonessa constituency, representing Alliance of the Right (National Alliance) and becoming the provincial group leader. Furthermore, he held the position of vice-president of the Rieti Provincial Tourism Agency (APT).

In 2013, he left The People of Freedom (Italian: Popolo della Libertà) party and joined Brothers of Italy (Italian: Fratelli d'Italia), where he ran for the Chamber of Deputies in the Lazio 2 constituency in the 2013 general elections but was not elected.

In the 2018 general elections, he was re-elected to the Chamber of Deputies in the single-member constituency of Lazio 2 - 03 (Rieti) as part of the center-right coalition representing Brothers of Italy. He secured victory with 37.14% of the votes, defeating the candidate from the 5 Star Movement, Maurizio Angeloni (32.67%), and the center-left candidate affiliated with the Democratic Party, Paolo Anibaldi (21.40%). During the 18th legislative term, he served as a member of the 8th Committee on Environment, Territory, and Public Works. He also held the position of group leader for Brothers of Italy in the 5th Committee on Budget, and from 3 December 2019 he served as the vice-president of the parliamentary commission of inquiry investigating the kidnapping and murder of Giulio Regeni.

In January 2019, he was appointed as the Regional Commissioner of Brothers of Italy for Lazio by Giorgia Meloni.

During the 2019 municipal elections, he chose not to run for re-election as the Mayor of Leonessa. Instead, he supported the candidacy of his deputy, Vito Paciucci, who, however, was defeated by the center-left candidate Gianluca Gizzi.

On 9 January 2020 he co-founded the "Lazio club Montecitorio 1900" along with other parliamentarians from various political backgrounds, and he assumed the role of President.

In the early parliamentary elections held on 25 September 2022, he was re-elected as a deputy in the single-member constituency of Rieti with 50.99% of the vote, surpassing Alessandra Clementini of the center-left (23.06%) and Roberto Casanica of the 5 Star Movement (14.27%). On 19 October he was elected as the Senior Quaestor of the Chamber of Deputies.
