= Social right (political theory) =

Social right is a right-wing political theory present in the European political spectrum, but mainly present in Italy. The main tenets of the social right thought are corporatism, social market economics, as well as nationalism.

According to Italian right-wing writer Marcello Veneziani, the political concept of social right rotates around the main tenets State interventism, where the State's action is aimed to the protection of weaker social sectors. At the same time, the Social right sees the State as promoting meritocracy and private initiative.

Main proponents of the concept of "social right" are Italian: theorists such as Gaetano Rasi and Giano Accame, but also politicians like Gianni Alemanno and Marcello De Angelis.

== Economic policy ==
According Italian right-wing politician Gianni Alemanno, social right endorses neo-keynesian measures of economic policy, favouring inflative monetary policies and in general assigning to the State the role of propulsive centre of the economic and social development.

According to the founding thesis of National Alliance, the social right aims to bring together workers and business owners, in order to defend the right to work and equity, also in order to mirror the Catholic social teachings.
