= Fabio Rampelli =

Italian politician (born 1960)

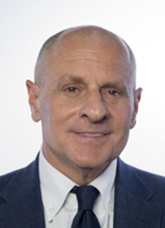

Vice-President of the Chamber of Deputies
- Incumbent
- Assumed office 13 June 2018
- President: Roberto Fico; Lorenzo Fontana

Member of the Chamber of Deputies
- Incumbent
- Assumed office 21 December 2005
- Constituency: Lazio 1

Personal details
- Born: 2 August 1960 (age 66) Rome, Italy
- Party: MSI (until 1995); AN (1995–2009); PdL (2009–2012); FdI (since 2012)
- Education: Sapienza University of Rome
- Profession: Politician, architect

Fabio Rampelli (born 2 August 1960) is an Italian politician.

== Biography ==
Rampelli graduated in Architecture at the University of Rome "La Sapienza" and worked as an architect. He was also a member of the Italy national swimming team in 1978.

In his youth, Rampelli joined the Roman Youth section of the Italian Social Movement and in 1989, together with Gianni Alemanno, he was arrested for protests in Nettuno for the arrival of George H. W. Bush. Rampelli served as municipal councilor of Rome from 1993 to 1997 and as regional councilor of Lazio from 1995 to 2005. In 2005 he was elected for the first time to the Chamber of Deputies with National Alliance. He joined later The People of Freedom and subsequently, in 2012, he followed Giorgia Meloni into Brothers of Italy. He has been chairman of the FdI's parliamentary group from 2014 to 2018, when he has been elected vice-president of the Chamber of Deputies.

In 2023, Rampelli proposed a law that would outlaw the use of any language other than Italian on official documents. The law has yet to go up for parliamentary debate.
