= National Action (Italy) =

National Action Azione Nazionale
- Leader: Gianni Alemanno
- President: Pasquale Viespoli
- Coordinator: Fausto Orsomarso
- Founded: 9 November 2015
- Dissolved: 18 February 2017
- Preceded by: Future and Freedom for Italy
- Merged into: National Movement for Sovereignty
- Headquarters: Via di San Godenzo 52 – Rome
- Ideology: Conservatism; National conservatism
- Political position: Right-wing
- Colours: Blue

Website
- www.azionenazionale.it

National Action (Italian: Azione Nazionale, AN) was a right-wing conservative political party in Italy.

Its members initially insisted that National Action, whose acronym is intentionally identical to that of the defunct National Alliance, was not a party, but a cultural association. The new AN's mentors were Gianfranco Fini (founder and leader of National Alliance, minister of Foreign Affairs, deputy prime minister and president of the Chamber of Deputies) and Gianni Alemanno (former leading member of National Alliance, minister of Agriculture and mayor of Rome).

National Action includes people affiliated to several groups, notably including FreeRight (a liberal-conservative association led by Fini), Italy First (a national- and social-conservative party led by Alemanno) and Alto Adige in the Heart (a regional party led by Alessandro Urzì in South Tyrol), and various individuals previously active in the old AN.

In 2017 the party was merged, along with The Right, into the National Movement for Sovereignty.

== History ==
The roots of the party can be traced in the tradition of the Italian Social Movement (MSI), the party of the post-fascist right, and its successor, National Alliance (AN), launched in 1993 and established in 1995.

In October 2015 the assembly of the "National Alliance Foundation", the association in charge of administering the assets of the defunct party (which was merged with Silvio Berlusconi's Forza Italia into The People of Freedom, PdL in 2009), confirmed the license to use the name and the symbol to Brothers of Italy (FdI), a right-wing party led by Giorgia Meloni. A front inspired by Fini, not a Foundation member, and led by Alemanno, who had proposed to form a larger party (including FdI), opposed the decision. After his defeat, Alemanno announced that he would create a "movement for the united right".

The new AN was launched on 9 November 2015 by a group of former AN members (most of whom active in regional and local government), who had joined forces with Alemanno during the Foundation's latest assembly. Fausto Orsomarso (regional councillor in Calabria elected with the PdL and re-elected with the new Forza Italia) was appointed coordinator, Pasquale Viespoli (a former senator of the PdL, FLI and National Cohesion) president. Fini did not participate in the party's first press conference and Alemanno was silent, but the symbol was registered by Roberto Menia (a close ally of Fini and former coordinator of FLI), Marco Cerreto (a close ally of Alemanno and splinter from FdI) and Giuseppe Scopelliti (a former President of Calabria who left the PdL in order to join the New Centre-Right in 2013).

AN and The Right, Storace's own party, merged into the National Movement for Sovereignty in February 2017. The new party elected Alemanno secretary, Menia deputy secretary and Scopelliti coordinator of the national board. However, neither Orsomarso, who had joined the FdI a month earlier, nor Viespoli joined.

== Ideology ==
National Action included people with very different political sensibilities, despite being mostly former members of National Alliance. In fact, over the years, Fini had become a staunch Europeanist and much of a social liberal when it came to abortion, LGBT issues, euthanasia, immigration and separation of church and state (in 2010 he broke with Berlusconi and launched his own Future and Freedom party), while Alemanno had always been a representative of the Social Right, whose program included traditional values and suspicion of the free market, and opposed the Euro (he remained a member of the PdL until 2013, after which he briefly joined FdI). According to Fini's remarks, the new AN would be a bulwark of the moderate right as opposed to the one represented by FdI and Lega Nord, the old AN's nemesis.

The party's credo was, however, quite traditional and socially conservative. AN wanted to "guarantee Italians first", supported life "from conception to natural death", gave emphasis to Italian sovereignty (and unity), and took a critical approach toward the European Union in its current form.

== Leadership ==
- Coordinator: Fausto Orsomarso (2015–2017)
- President: Pasquale Viespoli (2015–2017)
