= Fausto Orsomarso =

Italian politician (born 1971)

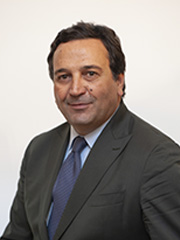
- Orsomarso in 2022

Member of the Senate of the Republic
- Incumbent
- Assumed office 13 October 2022
- Constituency: Calabria

Personal details
- Born: 18 August 1971 (age 54)
- Party: Brothers of Italy

Fausto Orsomarso (born 18 August 1971) is an Italian politician of Brothers of Italy who was elected member of the Senate of the Republic in 2022. From 2010 to 2020, he served in the Regional Council of Calabria. In 2015, he was a co-founder of National Action.
