= Mauro Rotelli =

Italian politician (born 1971)

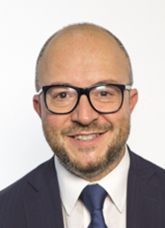
- Rotelli in 2018

Member of the Chamber of Deputies
- Incumbent
- Assumed office 23 March 2018
- Constituency: Lazio 2

Personal details
- Born: 2 April 1971 (age 55)
- Party: Brothers of Italy

Mauro Rotelli (born 2 April 1971) is an Italian politician of Brothers of Italy serving as a member of the Chamber of Deputies. He was first elected in the 2018 general election, and was re-elected in 2022. Since 2022, he has chaired the Environment Committee.

== Biography ==
Born in Viterbo, where he still lives, he earned his high school diploma in the science track from the Paolo Ruffini High School and went on to earn a bachelor’s degree in business administration and then a bachelor’s degree in political science and international relations from the Tuscia University.
