= Paolo De Castro =

Italian politician (born 1958)

Paolo De Castro MEP
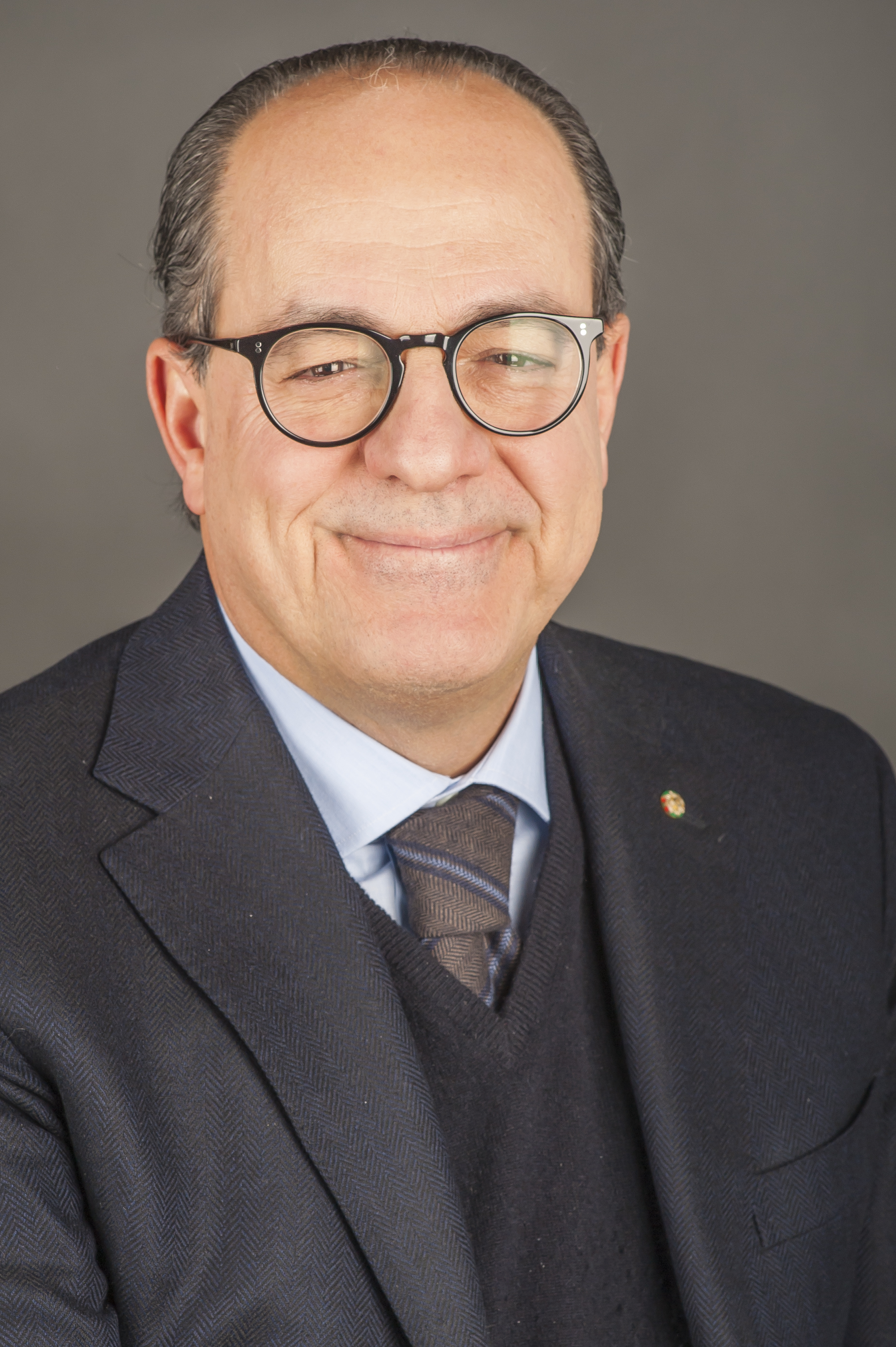

Member of the European Parliament
- In office 14 July 2009 – 15 July 2024
- Constituency: Southern Italy (2009–2014); North-East Italy (2014–2024)

Minister of Agriculture
- In office 17 May 2006 – 8 May 2008
- Prime Minister: Romano Prodi
- Preceded by: Gianni Alemanno
- Succeeded by: Luca Zaia
- In office 21 October 1998 – 25 April 2000
- Prime Minister: Massimo D'Alema
- Preceded by: Michele Pinto
- Succeeded by: Alfonso Pecoraro Scanio

Member of the Senate of the Republic
- In office 29 April 2008 – 14 July 2009
- Constituency: Apulia

Member of the Chamber of Deputies
- In office 28 April 2006 – 28 April 2008
- Constituency: Apulia

Personal details
- Born: 2 February 1958 (age 68) San Pietro Vernotico, Italy
- Party: PD (since 2007)
- Other political affiliations: Dem (1998–2002); The Daisy (2002–2007)
- Education: University of Bologna
- Profession: University professor

Paolo De Castro (born 2 February 1958) is an Italian politician. He was Minister of Agriculture, Food and Forestry Policies in the D'Alema I, D'Alema II and Prodi II cabinets.

In 2009 he was elected to the European Parliament, and served as chair of the parliament's Committee on Agriculture and Rural Development from 2009 to 2014. He has also served as professor of Agricultural Economics at the Veterinary Medicine University of Bologna. He is married and has two sons.

== Early life and career ==
Born in San Pietro Vernotico, Apulia, as a son of farmers; De Castro grew up on the family's 36-hectare farm. In 1980 he graduated at Bologna getting the maximum mark in Agricultural Science.

== Career ==
=== Career in academia ===
From January 2001 to May 2004, De Castro chaired the Nomisma Economics Studies Institute. He also chaired the Qualivita Foundation and currently runs the International Agricultural Policy Magazine edited by the Informatore Agrario in Verona. He is professor at the Agriculture Academy of Bologna, the Georgofili Agricultural Economics Academy of Florence, the Agriculture Academy of Pesaro and the National Academy of Treja.

From 1996 to 1998 de Castro served as economic advisor to Prime Minister Romano Prodi and economic advisor to the Minister of Agriculture and Forestry Resources, Michele Pinto. Since 1 June to 31 December 2000 he was appointed special Advisor to the EU Commission's president. From 21 October 1998 to 25 April 2000 he served as Minister of Agriculture and Forestry Policies in both governments chaired by Massimo D'Alema.

De Castro is also scientific coordinator of the International Center for Advanced Mediterranean Agronomic Studies (CIHEAM) in Paris, and scientific Director of the Genio Rurale Magazine: a magazine on goods evaluation and territory science of Edagricole. He is also member of the Italian Agricultural Economists' Society (SIDEA) and of the European Agricultural Economics Association (EAEA).

=== Minister of Agriculture, Food and Forestry Policy ===
A candidate in the Italian general election held from 9 to 10 April 2006 in Apulia in the Olive Tree list, De Castro was elected to the XV Legislature. In May 2006 he was appointed Minister of Agriculture, Food and Forestry Policies in the government chaired by Romano Prodi.

=== Member of the European Parliament ===
De Castro became a Member of the European Parliament following the 2009 European elections. In parliament, he is a member of the Progressive Alliance of Socialists and Democrats group. Since 2009 he has since been serving on the Committee on Agriculture and Rural Development. Between 2009 and 2014, De Castro acted as the committee's chairman. In this capacity, he led the parliament's negotiations in 2013 with the Council of the European Union on the Common Agricultural Policy (CAP) budget for 2014–2020. Since 2014, he has been serving as his parliamentary group's coordinator on the committee. In 2019, he also joined the Committee on Budgets.

In addition to his committee assignments, De Castro has been a member of the parliament's delegation for relations with the United States (since 2011) and of the European Parliament Intergroup on Extreme Poverty and Human Rights. From 2009 until 2011, he was also a member of the Delegation for relations with the Palestinian Legislative Council.

== Other activities ==
- Reimagine Europa, Member of the Advisory Board

== Recognition ==
In November 2000, President Carlo Azeglio Ciampi awarded De Castro the Cavaliere di Gran Croce al merito della Repubblica Italiana merit honour.

== Electoral history ==
Election	House	Constituency	Party	Votes	Result	Ref
2006	Chamber of Deputies	Apulia	Ulivo	– (Note: Candidate in a closed list proportional representation system.)	Elected	
2008	Chamber of Deputies	Apulia	PD	–	Elected	
2009	European Parliament	Southern Italy	PD	112,522	Elected	
2014	European Parliament	North-East Italy	PD	87,034	Elected	
2019	European Parliament	North-East Italy	PD	53,267	Elected	

Political offices
Preceded by Michele Pinto	Minister of Agriculture, Food and Forestry Policies; 1998–2000	Succeeded by Alfonso Pecoraro Scanio
Preceded by Gianni Alemanno	Minister of Agriculture, Food and Forestry Policies; 2006–2008	Succeeded by Luca Zaia
