= Paolo Agostinacchio =

Italian politician

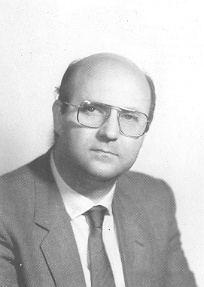

Mayor of Foggia
- In office 8 May 1995 – 28 June 2004
- Preceded by: Salvatore Chirolli
- Succeeded by: Orazio Ciliberti

Member of the Chamber of Deputies
- In office 12 July 1983 – 1 July 1987
- In office 23 April 1992 – 18 October 1995

Personal details
- Born: 22 July 1938 Ascoli Satriano, Province of Foggia, Kingdom of Italy
- Died: 26 June 2024 (aged 85) Foggia, Apulia, Italy
- Party: Italian Social Movement (until 1995); National Alliance (1995–2007); The Right (2007–2017); Brothers of Italy (2019–2024)
- Education: University of Bari
- Profession: Lawyer

Paolo Antonio Mario Agostinacchio (22 July 1938 – 26 June 2024) was an Italian politician and lawyer. A member of the Italian Social Movement and later National Alliance, he served as mayor of Foggia from 1995 to 2004 and was a member of the Chamber of Deputies for three legislatures.
