= Giuseppe Cossiga =

Italian politician

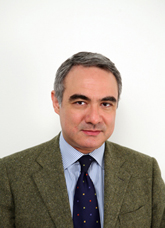

Undersecretary of Defence
- In office 12 May 2008 – 16 November 2011 Serving with Guido Crosetto
- Prime Minister: Silvio Berlusconi
- Preceded by: Emidio Casula
- Succeeded by: Gianluigi Magri

Deputy to the Italian Parliament
- In office 30 May 2001 – 27 April 2006
- Constituency: 2 – Luino (Lombardy 2)
- In office 28 April 2006 – 14 March 2013
- Constituency: Sardinia

Personal details
- Born: 30 October 1963 (age 62) Sassari, Sardinia, Italy
- Party: Forza Italia (1994–2009); The People of Freedom (2009–2012); Brothers of Italy (2012–2016)
- Parents: Francesco Cossiga (father); Giuseppa Sigurani (mother)
- Education: University of Rome
- Occupation: Engineer, politician

Giuseppe Cossiga (born 30 October 1963) is an Italian politician, member of Brothers of Italy from 2012 to 2016. Deputy from 2001 to 2013, he became (with Guido Crosetto) Undersecretary of State for Defence in the fourth cabinet of Silvio Berlusconi (2008–2011).

== Biography ==
=== Study and work ===
Cossiga was born in Sassari by politician Francesco Cossiga and his spouse, pharmacist Giuseppa Sigurani. He graduated in Aeronautical engineering at the University of Rome. He has worked in the aerospace sector and spent a significant period of time abroad in Toulouse, France and in the Middle East. He also focused on roads and traffic collection and control technologies in various countries; later, he worked in the telecommunications and multimedia services sectors.

He has been a teacher at the Sapienza University of Rome in the "Master for Air Transports" and Chairman of the ISTRID - Istituto Studi e Ricerche per la Difesa (Institute for Defence Studies and Research).

=== Political career ===
After his election as Member of Parliament in 2001, he has become the person of reference for Defence-related issues in FI, the Silvio Berlusconi's party. During the 14th Parliament (2001–2006), he was Member and Spokesperson of the Defence Committee, Member of the Constitutional Affairs Committee of the Lower House (known as Montecitorio), Member of the Parliamentary Commission of Inquiry on the Mitrokhin File and on the Nazi-fascist Crimes. He was re-elected to the 15th Parliament (2006–2008) for Forza Italia in the Constituency of Sardinia and appointed Member and Spokesperson for the Defence Committee of the Forza Italia Parliamentary Group. In 2008, he stood for election to the Parliament in the lists of The People of Freedom (PDL); he was re-elected to the 16th Parliament (2008–2013), again in the Constituency of Sardinia: in December 2012 he left, with Guido Crosetto, the PDL and run with Giorgia Meloni's Brothers of Italy (FdI) for Senate in the 2013 general election, but he was not elected because FdI did not passed the threshold at 3% of the electoral law known as Porcellum.

=== Personal life ===
Cossiga is the son of the former Italian prime minister and former president Francesco Cossiga. Giuseppe is a passionate historian and a fan of military simulations. He speaks English, French and Spanish. He is married and has one son.

Italian Chamber of Deputies
Preceded by Title jointly held	Deputy; Legislatures; XIV, XV, XVI; 2001–2013	Succeeded by Title jointly held
