= Italy First (political party) =

Italy First (Prima l'Italia) was a national-conservative political party in Italy, which was briefly a faction of Brothers of Italy (FdI) and then joined into National Action (AN).

The party was supported by the New Italy Foundation, previously active within The People of Freedom (PdL) as Alemanno's factional think tank.

== History ==
Italy First was launched as a "political association" in October 2013 by Gianni Alemanno, a former mayor of Rome (2008–2013) for the PdL. A long-time politician of the Italian Social Movement (MSI) and National Alliance (AN), within which he led the Social Right faction, Alemanno had left the PdL a few days earlier.

The founding manifesto of Italy First included criticism of the PdL, its participation in the European People's Party and its compliance to Europeanism and economic liberalism. One of the first political campaigns of the new party was against the euro currency.

Soon after its foundation, Italy First participated in the process of enlargement of FdI, a party led by Giorgia Meloni, through the "Workshop for Italy" and was finally integrated into FdI in March 2014. Italy First thus became a faction within FdI and Alemanno was one of the party's leading candidates in the 2014 European Parliament election: he obtained almost 45,000 personal votes in the South, but was not elected to the European Parliament as FdI was below the 4% national threshold.

In December 2014 Alemanno, who was mired in a scandal related to his tenure as mayor of Rome, and, consequently, Italy First left FdI.

In October 2015, during an assembly of the "National Alliance Foundation" (the association in charge of administering the assets of the defunct party), Alemanno and his supporters, who wanted to form a larger right-wing party (including FdI), lost a vote on the entitlement of AN's symbol over the representatives of FdI, supported by former AN heavyweights who had remained in the PdL. As a result, Alemanno announced that he would create a "Movement for the United Right". That "movement" is National Action (AN), which was formed on 9 November 2015 by a group of former AN members, who had joined forces with Alemanno during the Foundation's assembly.

== Leadership ==
- President: Gianni Alemanno (2013–2015)
- Secretary: Francesco Biava (2013–2015)
