= Ester Mieli =

Italian politician (born 1976)

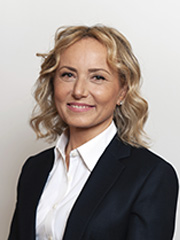
- Mieli in 2022

Member of the Senate
- Incumbent
- Assumed office 13 October 2022
- Constituency: Lazio

Personal details
- Born: 22 April 1976 (age 50)
- Party: Brothers of Italy

Ester Mieli (born 22 April 1976) is an Italian politician of Brothers of Italy. She has been a member of the Senate since 2022, and a substitute member of the Parliamentary Assembly of the Council of Europe since 2023. She is the granddaughter of a holocaust survivor, she did not want to mix her heritage with her political career. She was a journalist for the Italian programme Zona bianca.

== Biography ==
She was born on April 22, 1976, in Rome, where she still lives. She is the granddaughter of the Italian writer and Holocaust survivor Alberto Mieli. After earning her high school diploma in the science track from the “Renzo Levi” high school in Rome, she graduated with a degree in sociology from Sapienza University of Rome and earned a three-year university diploma in Jewish studies from the “Renzo Gattegna” program, organized by the UCEI. A professional journalist, she has contributed to Il Sole 24 Ore, Libero, Il Tempo, and Metro, and since 2021 has been a member of the editorial staff of the television program Zona bianca, which airs on Rete 4.She has served as a spokesperson for the Jewish community of Rome.
