= Francesco Lollobrigida =

Italian politician (born 1972)

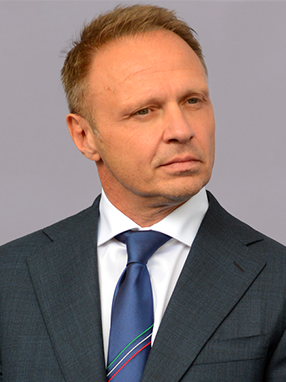
- Lollobrigida in 2022

Minister of Agriculture
- Incumbent
- Assumed office 22 October 2022
- Prime Minister: Giorgia Meloni
- Preceded by: Stefano Patuanelli

Member of the Chamber of Deputies
- Incumbent
- Assumed office 23 March 2018

Personal details
- Born: 21 March 1972 (age 54) Tivoli, Lazio, Italy
- Party: Brothers of Italy (since 2012)
- Other political affiliations: MSI (before 1995); AN (1995–2009); PdL (2009–2012)
- Height: 1.80 m (5 ft 11 in)
- Domestic partner: Arianna Meloni (2000–2024)
- Children: 2
- Relatives: Gina Lollobrigida (second cousin once removed); Guido Lollobrigida (distant cousin); Francesca Lollobrigida (distant cousin)
- Education: Niccolò Cusano University

Francesco Lollobrigida (born 21 March 1972) is an Italian politician who has been the minister of Agriculture since 22 October 2022. A leading member of the national-conservative Brothers of Italy, Lollobrigida is widely considered one of the closest allies of Giorgia Meloni.

== Early life, family, and education ==
Lollobrigida was born in Tivoli, Lazio on 21 March 1972. He is a distant cousin of actress Gina Lollobrigida (whose grandfather Luigi was a brother of his great-grandfather Nazzareno) and Olympic speed skating gold medalist Francesca Lollobrigida. He graduated in law from the Niccolò Cusano telematic university.

His domestic partner was Arianna Meloni who is the sister of incumbent Prime Minister Giorgia Meloni. They have two daughters.

== Career ==
During the 1990s, Lollobrigida started his involvement in politics within the Youth Front (FdG), the youth-wing of the neo-fascist Italian Social Movement (MSI). Until 1995, Lollobrigida served as provincial secretary of FdG for Rome. From 1997 to 1999, he served as leader of Student Action, a far-right student movement connected to National Alliance (AN), the MSI's heir. During this period, he also held various political positions at the provincial level, including municipal councilor in Subiaco (1996–2000), provincial councilor in Rome (1998–2003) and councilor for sport, culture and tourism in the municipality of Ardea (2005–2006).

He ran in the 2005 Lazio regional election, in support of incumbent President Francesco Storace, but he was not elected. On 5 July 2006, he was elected regional councilor in Lazio, taking over from Andrea Augello, elected to the Senate of the Republic in the 2006 general election. In 2008, he became provincial president of National Alliance for Rome and from 2010 to 2012 he held the same position in The People of Freedom (PdL). On 17 April 2010, he was appointed councilor for mobility and transport in the Lazio regional government of Renata Polverini, a position he held until 12 March 2013.

Since 2012, Lollobrigida is a member of the Brothers of Italy (FdI) and was elected as a deputy for Lazio region representing the party in the 2018 general election. From June 2018 he served as its parliamentary group leader In the 2022 general elections he also won a seat in the Parliament. He was appointed minister of Agriculture, Food Sovereignty and Forests on 22 October 2022 in the government led by Prime Minister Giorgia Meloni.

== Controversy ==
On 19 April 2023 Lollobrigida attracted criticism for his remarks to a trade union conference suggesting that "Italians are having fewer children, so we're replacing them with someone else. [We say] yes to helping births, no to ethnic replacement. That's not the way forward." Opposition politicians set his remarks in the wider context of the racist Great Replacement theory.

== Electoral history ==
Election	House	Constituency	Party	Votes	Result
2018	Chamber of Deputies	Lazio 2	FdI	– (Note: Elected in a closed list proportional representation system.)	Elected
2022	Chamber of Deputies	Lazio 2	FdI	–	Elected
