= Arianna Meloni =

Italian politician, sister of Georgia Meloni (born 1975)

Head of the Political Secretariat of Brothers of Italy
- Incumbent
- Assumed office 24 August 2023
- Leader: Giorgia Meloni

Personal details
- Born: 26 May 1975 (age 51) Rome, Italy
- Party: FdI (since 2022)
- Other political affiliations: MSI (1992–1995); AN (1995–2009); Independent (2009–2022)
- Domestic partner: Francesco Lollobrigida (2000–2024)
- Children: 2

Arianna Meloni (born 26 May 1975) is an Italian politician of Brothers of Italy, serving as the Head of the Political Secretariat under the leadership of her sister, Giorgia Meloni.

== Biography ==
Arianna Meloni was born on 26 May 1975 in Rome, Italy. Her father, Francesco Meloni, was the son of Nino Meloni, a radio director from Sardinia, and the actress Zoe Incrocci from Lombardy. Meloni's mother, Anna Paratore, is from Sicily. Her father was a tax advisor and, according to some political profiles, had communist sympathies and voted for the Italian Communist Party, while her mother later became a novelist. Her father abandoned the family in 1978 when she was three years old, moving to the Canary Islands and remarrying. She has a younger sister, Giorgia.

From the age of 17, like her sister Giorgia, she became involved in politics, obtaining her first party membership card with the neo-fascist Italian Social Movement (MSI). However, over the years, she remained largely out of the political spotlight. She temporarily left her law studies at university to enter the workforce and, since 2000, she has been employed by the Lazio regional government.

Since the early 2000s, she has been in a relationship with Francesco Lollobrigida, a right-wing politician and Minister of Agriculture since 2022. The couple had two daughters, Vittoria and Rachele. However, their relationship ended in 2024.

In 2022, her sister was elected Prime Minister of Italy and, in 2023, Meloni was appointed head of the political secretariat of Brothers of Italy (FdI).
