= Ministry of the Environment (Italy) =

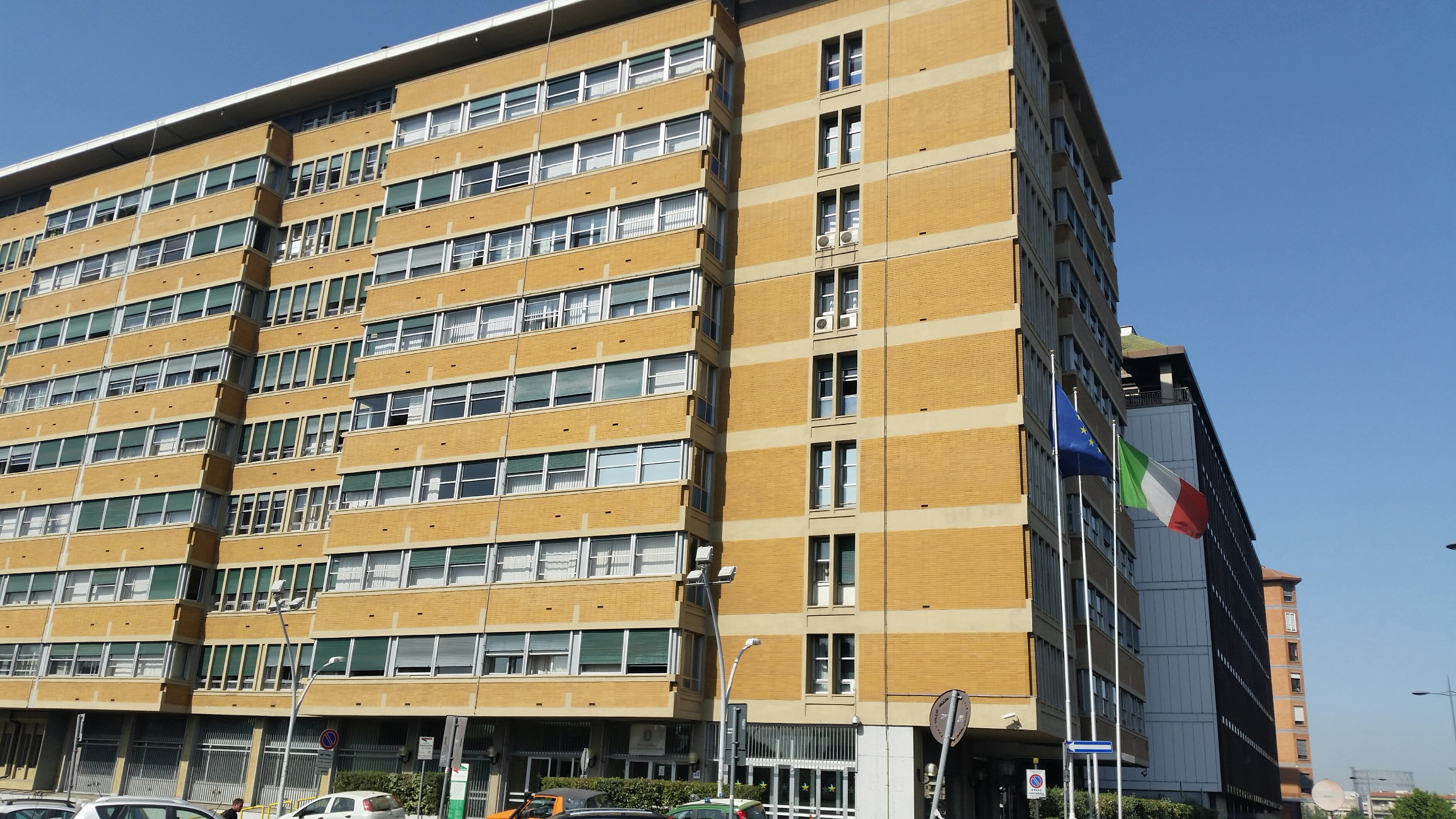
Seat of the Ministry of the Environment (Italy)

The Ministry for Environment, Land and Sea Protection of Italy (Italian: Ministero dell'Ambiente e della Tutela del Territorio e del Mare, also known as MATTM) was an Italian ministry established in 1981. The ministry is responsible for environmental issues in Italy. It was led by the Minister of the Environment. it was abolished in 2021, and replaced by the Ministry of the Ecological Transition.
