= Social Right (faction) =

Faction of the National Alliance political party in Italy

Social Right (Destra Sociale) was the main national- and social-conservative faction within National Alliance, a political party in Italy.

The faction had two main leaders: Francesco Storace and Gianni Alemanno. Although the first had once been one of the closest aides to Gianfranco Fini, the faction soon became the most vocally critic of Fini's leadership and his departures from the tradition of the post-fascist Italian Social Movement. The faction's stances ranged from a strong social conservatism to a sort of economic left-wing populism, favouring big government and criticising free market.

In the 2002 party congress the Social Right had more than 30% of the delegates. In that occasion Storace was particularly critical of Fini.

In 2006 Storace broke with Alemanno as the latter chose to support Fini and his proposal to merge the party with Forza Italia and, thus, enter the European People's Party. Storace accused Fini of being a Christian democrat and formed D-Destra, a new faction, while Alemanno launched New Italy.

Since Storace's departure in 2007 to form The Right, which represented the definitive break-up of the Social Right faction, and National Alliance's merger into The People of Freedom in 2009, most Social Rightists conclusively distanced from Fini, who had become a vocal social liberal, and, among them, Alemanno joined forces with The People of Freedom's Christian democrats on several issues. Eventually, Alemanno, along with his New Italy think tank, left The People of Freedom, launched Italy First in 2013, briefly joined Brothers of Italy in 2014, before being instrumental in the foundation of National Action in 2015.

The Right and National Action merged into the National Movement for Sovereignty in February 2017, overcoming ten years of separation for Storace and Alemanno.
