= Maria Alessandra Gallone =

Italian politician (born 1966)

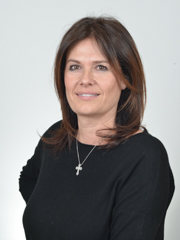

Member of the Senate of the Republic for Bergamo
- In office 9 December 2008 – 12 October 2022
- Preceded by: constituency established
- Constituency: Lombardy 12

Personal details
- Born: 2 September 1966 Italy
- Party: Forza Italia

Maria Alessandra Gallone (born 2 September 1966) is an Italian politician. Senator Gallone concluded her first mandate in 2013, a second mandate started in 2018. Senator worked strictly with mayor of Bergamo between 1999 and 2004. She also served on the city council for 20 years.
