= Patrizia Marrocco =

Italian politician (born 1977)

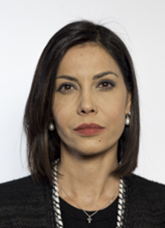
- Marrocco in 2018

Member of the Chamber of Deputies
- Incumbent
- Assumed office 23 March 2018
- Constituency: Lazio 2 – P02 (2018–2022); Lazio 2 – P02 (2022–present)

Personal details
- Born: 21 March 1977 (age 49)
- Party: Forza Italia

Patrizia Marrocco (born 21 March 1977) is an Italian politician serving as a member of the Chamber of Deputies since 2018. She has served as deputy chairwoman of the inquiry committee on working conditions, exploitation of labour and occupational safety and health since 2023.
