= Roberto Menia =

Italian politician (born 1961)

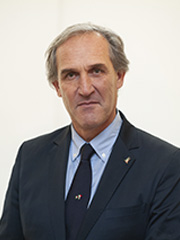

Member of the Senate of the Republic
- Incumbent
- Assumed office 13 October 2022
- Constituency: Liguria

Member of the Chamber of Deputies
- In office 15 April 1994 – 14 March 2013
- Constituency: Friuli-Venezia Giulia

Personal details
- Born: 3 December 1961 (age 64) Pieve di Cadore, Italy
- Party: FdI (since 2019)
- Other political affiliations: MSI (till 1995); AN (1995–2008); PdL (2008–2010); FLI (2010–2015); AzN (2015–2017); MNS (2017–2019)
- Education: University of Trieste
- Profession: Politician, journalist

Roberto Menia (born 3 December 1961) is an Italian politician.

== Biography ==
Born in Pieve di Cadore, Veneto, Menia is the son of an Istrian exile of Buje, who moved to Trieste after the war. He has a law degree and he is a publicist journalist. Menia began his political activity in the youth organization of the Italian Social Movement, under the leadership of Almerigo Grilz.

In 1994, Menia was elected for the first time to the Chamber of Deputies and he was re-confirmed as deputy until 2013. In 2004, Menia was the first promoter of the law which established 10 February as Day of Remembrance dedicated to the martyrs of Foibe. On 12 May 2008, he was appointed Undersecretary for the Environment in the Berlusconi IV Cabinet. On 21 March 2009, in the last Congress of National Alliance, Menia was the only one to vote against the dissolution of the party and its merge into The People of Freedom. In 2010, he left the PdL and he resigned as Undersecretary to follow Gianfranco Fini into his new party, Future and Freedom.

In the 2013 general election he was again placed as a candidate in the list of FLI, but the party didn't pass the electoral threshold and he wasn't re-elected. After the electoral failure, Fini resigned as President of FLI and Menia was appointed Regent Coordinator of the party. In 2017, Menia was appointed Deputy Secretary of the National Movement for Sovereignty.
