= The Right (Italy) =

Italian national-conservative political party

The Right La Destra
- Secretary: Francesco Storace
- Vice Secretary: Nello Musumeci
- Founded: 14 July 2007
- Dissolved: 18 February 2017
- Split from: National Alliance
- Merged into: National Movement for Sovereignty
- Headquarters: Via Sebastiano Conca 6, Rome
- Newspaper: Il Giornale d'Italia (online)
- Youth wing: Italian Youth
- Ideology: Right-wing populism Neo-fascism; National conservatism
- Political position: Far-right
- Religion: Roman Catholicism
- European Parliament group: Union for Europe of the Nations

The Right (Italian: La Destra) was a national-conservative and neo-fascist political party in Italy. Its founder and leader was Francesco Storace.

== History ==
=== Foundation ===
On 3 July 2007 Storace announced his resignation from National Alliance (AN) in a letter posted on his website, claiming that AN had become too centrist and moderate and in protest against the lack of internal democracy in the party, and on 27 July he announced the formation of a new party.

On 10 November the party was founded in a constituent congress in Rome. On that occasion the Sicilian Alliance of Nello Musumeci merged into The Right, and Daniela Santanchè, a leading female member of AN, left the party to join The Right, broadening its appeal, as she was close to the Italian Liberal Party (PLI) and never joined the Italian Social Movement (MSI). In January 2008 Unitalia, a minor party in South Tyrol, and Taverna List, a minor party in the province of Trentino, merged into The Right.

As the party was organised as a federal structure, Unitalia and Taverna List became the provincial sections of the party in the provinces of South Tyrol and Trento, respectively, as Sicilian Alliance had become the regional section of the party in Sicily.

=== 2008 general election ===
On 27 February 2008 it was announced that The Right would contest the 2008 general election in alliance with Tricolour Flame, outside The People of Freedom-led centre-right coalition, in a joint list known as The Right–Tricolour Flame. Daniela Santanchè was the candidate for Prime Minister of Italy, and leader of the joint list between the two parties.

On 18 January 2008 Giancarlo Pagliarini joined the party. Pagliarini is a libertarian and keen fiscal federalist who was a leading member of Lega Nord from 1991 to 2007 and was close to the independentist wing of the party. He headed the coalition list in Lombardy for the Senate.

Despite several well-known candidates, the party gained only 2.4% and thus failed to surpass the 4% threshold for entering the Chamber of Deputies. Also Storace, who topped the list in his home-region Lazio, failed re-election, as the coalition stopped at 3.2%, five points below the 8% regional threshold.

=== Out of Parliament ===
On 20 July 2008, during a party convention, Storace resigned from party leadership, opening way for a national congress and a leadership election. This election would also decide the party's electoral strategy, choosing either to continue an independent path or to join The People of Freedom (PdL) of Silvio Berlusconi. Storace favoured the first option, while Santanchè favoured an alliance with Berlusconi. Storace would continue to be party secretary at least until the November congress and after if party members decided so.

On 22 August 2008 Santanchè presented her candidacy for the party leadership, competing against Storace, who would stand again as candidate. However, on 28 September, Santanché resigned as spokesperson and from the party, opening the possibility for a more consensual congress. On 9 November Storace was re-elected secretary during a party congress. On that occasion he remarked that he did not exclude a future alliance with PdL.

In October 2008 the party suffered another split led by Stefano Morselli, who launched Federal Right, and Paolo Casolari, journalist, one of the founders and head of the party in Emilia-Romagna. In November Santanchè launched her Movement for Italy. Both parties were expected to join PdL, while a third party resulting from the split, Libertarian Right led by Luciano Buonocore, joined it.

In the 2009 European Parliament election the party ran as part of The Autonomy, an alliance including the Movement for the Autonomies, the Pensioners' Party and the Alliance of the Centre, gaining 2.2% of the vote, resulting in no seats in the European Parliament. For the 2010 regional elections Storace signed a national pact with the PdL under which The Right supported PdL or Lega Nord candidates for president in all 13 regions where an election took place.

In the 2012 Sicilian regional election, Nello Musumeci ran for president for the centre-right coalition, but lost to Rosario Crocetta of the Democratic Party.

In the 2013 general election, held in February 2013, the party obtained 0.7% of the vote, gaining no seats.

=== European Parliament election of 2014 ===
On the occasion of the 2014 European Parliament election The Right supported the candidates of Forza Italia.

=== Adhesion to National Movement for Sovereignty ===
On 18 February 2017 the Right, together with National Action, merged into the new party called National Movement for Sovereignty.

== Ideology ==
The party defined itself the party of the "social, national and popular right" and promoting patriotism, Catholic values and national cohesion. Among other things, The Right was strongly supportive of direct democracy and of presidentialism. Its economic policy was a mixture of statism, such the strong support for the welfare state and the introduction of the so-called "social loan" (mutuo sociale) for young people to enable them to purchase a house, and of libertarian proposals, such as the introduction of the flat tax and fiscal federalism.

Party leader Francesco Storace maintained that his party had nothing to do with the far right and instead he says to take inspiration from Indro Montanelli, a conservative-liberal journalist and editor of Il Giornale who declared "I am a right-winger, but this is not the right-wing I dreamt of". Although the party distanced itself from The People of Freedom, it also rejected any alliance with the parties of the far right, such as New Force and Tricolour Flame, with which it had formed a joint list for the 2008 general election.

== Members ==
The party in 2007–2008 had 7 MPs: 4 deputies (Teodoro Buontempo, Antonio Pezzella, Roberto Salerno and Daniela Santanchè) and 3 senators (Stefano Losurdo, Stefano Morselli and Francesco Storace himself). Leading members of the new party include Nello Musumeci, MEP, Paolo Danieli and Michele Florino, both former senators, Alberto Arrighi, former editor of Area (the journal of Social Right, a faction of AN), Paolo Agostinacchio, former mayor of Foggia, and Nuccio Carrara (former under-secretary for Reforms in Berlusconi's governments).

== Popular support ==
The first opinion poll after the announcement of Storace put The Right at 3.2%. According to this survey, The Right may steal votes both from National Alliance and from Social Action, Alessandra Mussolini's party. Other polls have placed the party around 5%. After the fall of Romano Prodi government, The Right was placed at 3.3%.

However, in the 2008 general election, the party was damaged by its choice to run alone and won only 2.4% of the vote. In that occasion the party was particularly strong in Central Italy: 3.6% in Umbria, 3.4% in Lazio and the Marche.

== Electoral results ==
=== Italian Parliament ===
Chamber of Deputies
Election year	# of overall votes	% of overall vote	# of overall seats won	+/–	Leader
2008	884,961 (#7)	2.4	0 / 630	–	Daniela Santanchè
2013	219,816 (#11)	0.6	0 / 630	–	Francesco Storace

Senate of the Republic
Election year	# of overall votes	% of overall vote	# of overall seats won	+/–	Leader
2008	686,926 (#7)	2.1	0 / 315	–	Daniela Santanchè
2013	221,112 (#10)	0.7	0 / 315	–	Francesco Storace

=== European Parliament ===
Election year	# of overall votes	% of overall vote	# of overall seats won	+/–	Leader
2009	681,290 (#9)	2.2	0 / 72	–	Francesco Storace

== Leadership ==
- Secretary: Francesco Storace (2007–2017)
  - Deputy-Secretary: Nello Musumeci (2008–2017)
  - Administrative Secretary: Giulio La Starza (2007–2008), Livio Proietti (2008–2017)
  - Organizational Secretary: Stefano Morselli (2007–2008), Aldo Traccheggiani (2008–2009), Bruno Esposito (2009–2011), Roberto Buonasorte (2011–2017)
  - Spokesperson: Daniela Santanchè (2007–2008)
- President: Teodoro Buontempo (2007–2013)
