= Raffaele Trano =

Italian politician (born 1979)

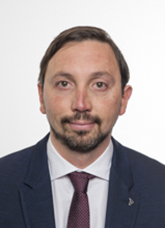
- Trano in 2018

Member of the Chamber of Deputies
- In office 23 March 2018 – 12 October 2022
- Constituency: Lazio 2 – P02

Personal details
- Born: 1 April 1979 (age 47)
- Party: Five Star Movement (2018–2020); Alternativa (2021–2025)

Raffaele Trano (born 1 April 1979) is an Italian politician. From 2018 to 2022, he was a member of the Chamber of Deputies. From March to July 2020, he served as chairman of the Finance Committee.
