= Ministry of Ecological Transition (Italy) =

Government ministry of Italy

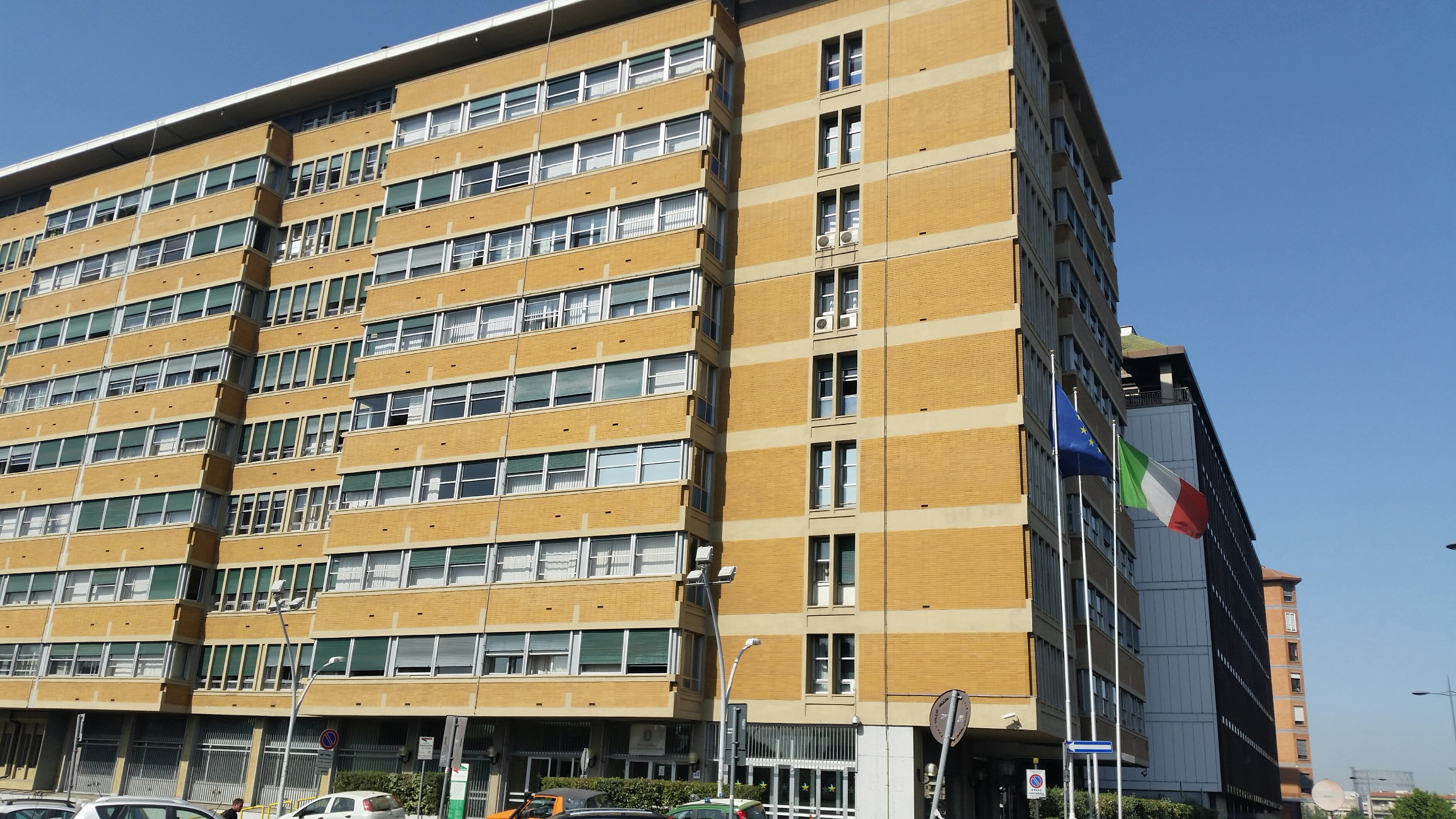
The ministry headquarters in Rome

The Ministry of Ecological Transition (Italian: Ministero dell'ambiente e della sicurezza energetica) is a department of the Italian government. It was formed in 2021 by the Draghi Cabinet, and replaced the Ministry of the Environment.

== Ministers ==
The ministry is led by the Italian Minister of the Environment.

Ilaria Fontana is Undersecretary of State.
