= Gianni Alemanno =

Italian politician (born 1958)

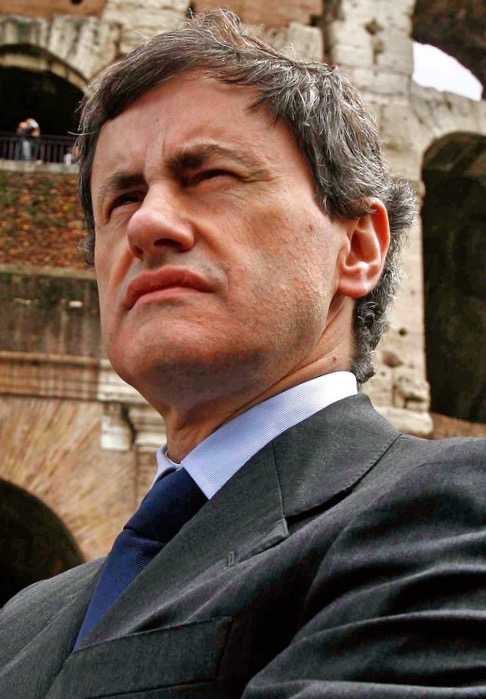
- Alemanno in 2008

Mayor of Rome
- In office 28 April 2008 – 12 June 2013
- Preceded by: Walter Veltroni
- Succeeded by: Ignazio Marino

Minister of Agricultural and Forestry Policies
- In office 11 June 2001 – 17 May 2006
- Prime Minister: Silvio Berlusconi
- Preceded by: Alfonso Pecoraro Scanio
- Succeeded by: Paolo De Castro

Member of the Chamber of Deputies
- In office 15 April 1994 – 28 April 2008
- Constituency: Rome

Personal details
- Born: Giovanni Alemanno; 3 March 1958 (age 68) Bari, Italy
- Party: FN (since 2026)
- Other political affiliations: MSI (1980–1995); AN (1995–2009); PdL (2009–2013); PI (2013–2014); FdI (2014–2015; 2019–2022); AN (2015–2017); MNS (2017–2019); Independent (2022–2023); Indipendenza (2023–2026)
- Height: 1.68 m (5 ft 6 in)
- Spouse: Isabella Rauti (m. 1992; div. 2018)
- Children: Manfredi (b. 1995)
- Education: University of Perugia
- Profession: Journalist, engineer

Giovanni "Gianni" Alemanno (born 3 March 1958) is an Italian politician who from April 2008 until June 2013 was mayor of Rome for The People of Freedom. He was the secretary of the National Movement for Sovereignty from 2017 to 2019.

== Career ==
Alemanno was born in Bari on 3 March 1958. At an early age, he joined the Italian Social Movement (MSI), a neo-fascist party, and although arrested three times, he was never convicted. The first arrest took place in Rome on 20 November 1981, when he was accused (along with four others) of intimidating a 23-year-old student, Dario D'Andrea, who was hit on the head by Sergio Mariani, then secretary of the Fronte della Gioventù (the youth organization of the MSI). Mariani was sentenced, while Alemanno was acquitted. The second time was in 1982, when Alemanno was accused of throwing a Molotov cocktail at the Soviet Union (USSR) embassy. According to other sources, his arrest followed a brawl that broke out during a protest against the USSR. Despite being sentenced to eight months in Rebibbia Prison, he was subsequently acquitted.

Alemanno became the national secretary of the youth organization of the party in 1988. After being elected regional deputy of Lazio in 1990, he was elected for the first time to the Chamber of Deputies in the 1994 Italian general election. In 1995, he joined the newly formed National Alliance, a post-fascist party that succeeded the MSI following its repudiation of far-right politics and extremism at the Congress of Fiuggi in 1994. Together with Francesco Storace, he founded Social Right, a national-conservative and social-conservative faction within National Alliance. Between 2001 and 2006, Alemanno was Minister of Agriculture under Silvio Berlusconi's second and third governments. In 2004, in order to encourage and patronage the Italian Mountaineering Expedition and Delegates bound for K2 he arrived Pakistan for participation in celebration of K2 Golden Jubilee ceremony at Concordia base camp. The Alpine Club of Pakistan marked a friendship expedition headed by Hayatullah Khan Durrani as chief of the Pakistan National mountaineering team to represent Pakistan in the Golden Jubilee ceremony of K2 mountain.

=== Mayor of Rome ===
After having been heavily defeated by Walter Veltroni in the 2006 mayoral election of Rome, in April 2008, he defeated Francesco Rutelli and became mayor of the city. Alemanno rejected a formal alliance with the far-right party, but his critics emphasized that his victory was greeted by crowds of supporters, among them far-right skinheads, who chanted "Duce! Duce!" and raised their arms in a fascist salute; then Alemanno said: "People calling me Duce make me laugh. I’m not at all fascist and I think that today the word belongs to the history books. I’ve grown to hate all forms of totalitarianism, whether of the left or of the right."

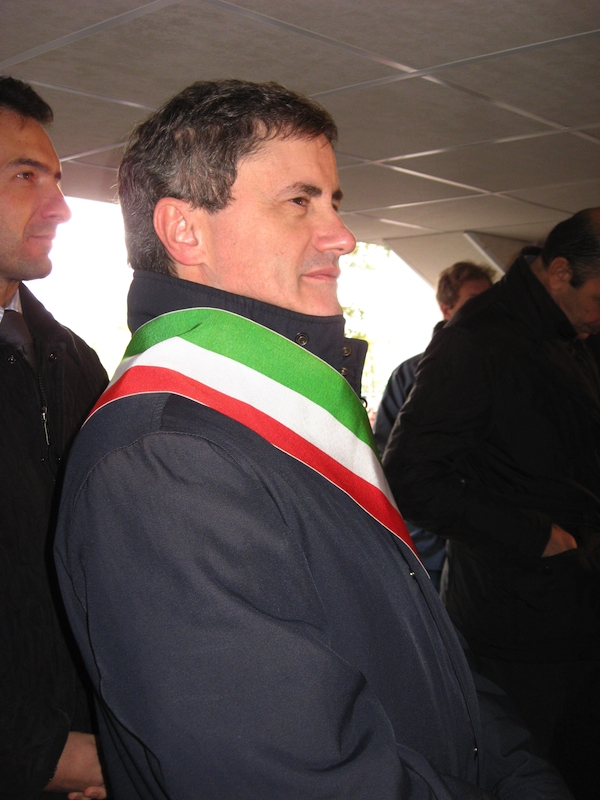
Alemanno as mayor of Rome

In August 2008, Alemanno ignited controversy over immigration and the status of Romani people in Italy, when a group of Romani men attacked a Dutch couple that had been camping outside Rome. The couple were beaten and robbed and the woman was raped. Alemanno stated that the couple had been "very careless" by camping in an area "forgotten by God and man" where camping was illegal. Alemanno said that the attack was an isolated case, and repeated that he wanted to crack down on crime, regaining total control of the territory. In November 2008, Alemanno decided to build a museum dedicated to the memory of the Holocaust in a Roman park. The leader of Rome's Jewish community, Riccardo Pacifici, praised the mayor for this project.

Alemanno is the son-in-law of Pino Rauti, a former leader of the Italian Social Movement. He always wears a necklace with a Celtic cross. He stated he wears it only as a religious symbol and because of a personal meaning for him, being a jewel worn by his friend Paolo di Nella, a far-right militant who had been killed during the 1970s Anni di Piombo.

The approval of the Romans of the mayor Alemanno rose to 60% in January 2009. In February 2009 Alemanno conferred honorary citizenship to Dalai Lama, leader of the Tibetan government-in-exile. In July 2009, Alemanno conferred honorary citizenship to captive Israeli soldier Gilad Shalit.

Other important measures of the Alemanno Administration were: an ordinance against prostitution in the streets, an attempt to recapitalize the municipal company AMA redefining its role, the census and the dismantling of six camps for nomads (including the Casilino 900) setting up garrisons, thus ensuring immunizations and education for Romani children, and to expel illegal immigrants. In August 2012 was approved the "family quotient", introduced by Alemanno to balance the waste charge according to economic situation, number of components, and any health burdens, of Roman families. Among the projects of Alemanno as a mayor was the construction of a tourist amusement park dedicated to ancient Rome.

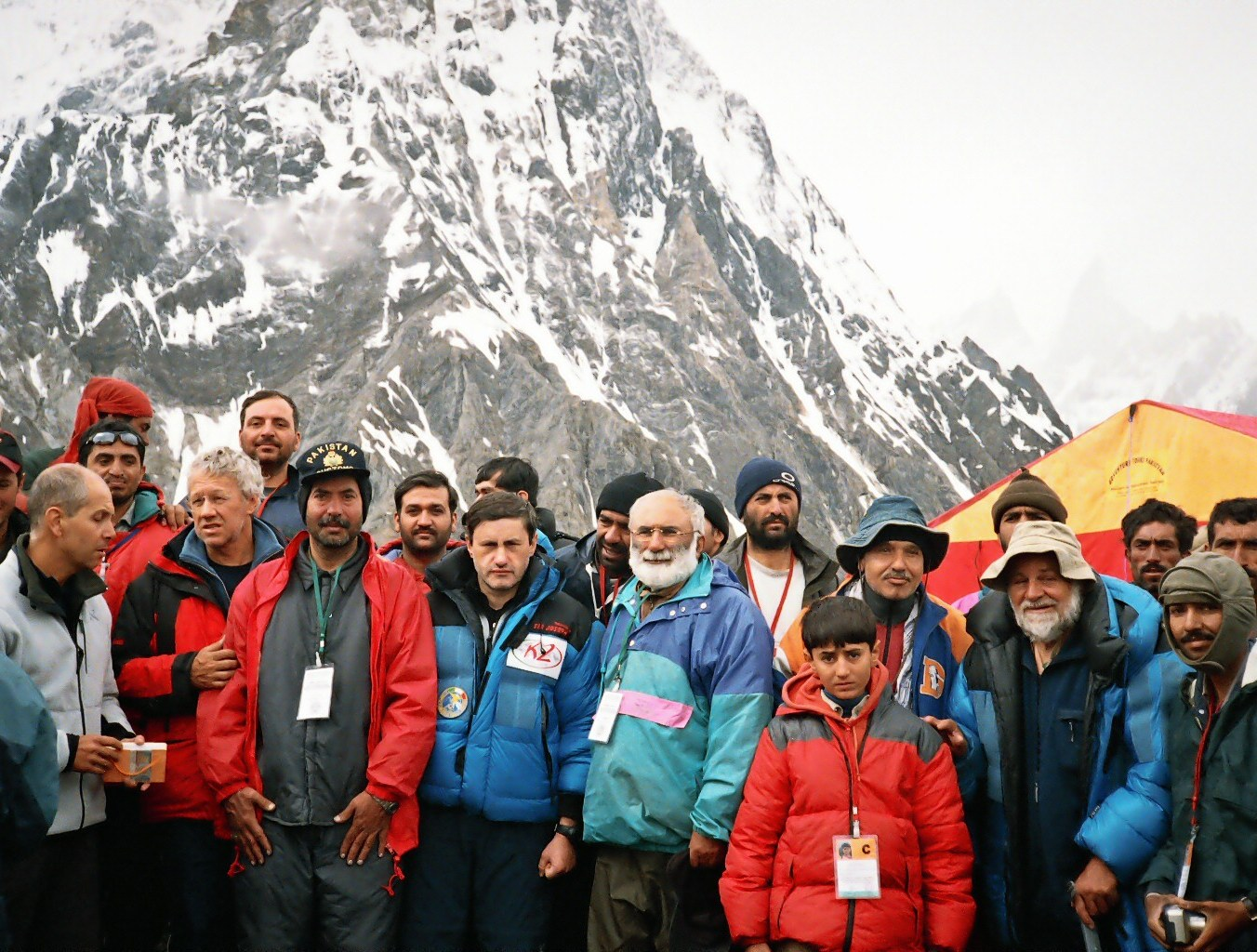
Group of Chiltan Adventurers Association Balochistan with Lino Lacedelli and Alemanno at Concordia base camp 2004

== Corruption allegations ==
In late 2014, Alemanno was investigated in the 2014 Rome corruption scandal, involving an external cooperation in a mafia association. On 23 March 2015, he was indicted along with seven other people due to an alleged illicit funding received for the Lazio regional elections of 2010 that would have been masked by a false poll in favour of Renata Polverini's list. Alemanno says: "I have never called for or received unlawful financing, this is a marginal event I could not verify the legal requirements because it was not about my election campaign." On 18 December 2015, he was indicted for corruption and illicit financing. According to the accusation, Alemanno received €125,000 from the cooperatives' boss Salvatore Buzzi. On 7 February 2017, the allegation of an external cooperation in a mafia association was filed, including the allegations of corruption and illicit funding. In February 2019, Alemanno was sentenced to six years in prison for corruption and illicit financing in the Mafia Capitale trial. After the sentence, Alemanno resigned as secretary of the National Movement for Sovereignty.

== Electoral history ==
Election	House	Constituency	Party	Votes	Result
1994	Chamber of Deputies	Rome – Suburban Gianicolense	AN	39,978	Elected
1996	Chamber of Deputies	Rome – Suburban Gianicolense	AN	40,785	Not elected
1996	Chamber of Deputies	Lazio 1	AN	– (Note: Elected in a closed list proportional representation system.)	Elected
2001	Chamber of Deputies	Rome – Trionfale	AN	33,578	Elected
2006	Chamber of Deputies	Lazio 1	AN	–	Elected
2008	Chamber of Deputies	Lazio 1	PdL	–	Elected
2014	European Parliament	Southern Italy	FdI	44,888	Not elected

=== First-past-the-post elections ===
1994 general election (C): Rome – Suburban Gianicolense
Candidate	Coalition	Votes	%
Gianni Alemanno	Pole of Good Government (AN)	39,978	46.8
Giuseppe Ignesti	Progressives (PDS)	31,511	36.9
Paolo Barelli	Pact for Italy (PS)	9,948	11.6
Alberto Antinori	Pannella List	3,947	4.6
Total		85,384	100.0

1996 general election (C): Rome – Suburban Gianicolense
Candidate	Coalition	Votes	%
Pier Paolo Cento	The Olive Tree (FdV)	41,105	50.2
Gianni Alemanno	Pole for Freedoms (AN)	40,785	49.8
Total		81,890	100.0

2001 general election (C): Rome – Trionfale
Candidate	Coalition	Votes	%
Gianni Alemanno	House of Freedoms (AN)	33,578	48.2
Giuliano Falcolini	The Olive Tree	31,866	45.8
Salvatore Mattiacci	Italy of Values	2,077	3.0
Marco Eramo	Pannella-Bonino List	2,076	3.0
Total		65,597	100.0

== Writings ==
- Arad Boaz; Mosheh Gordon, ha-Kohen.; Gianni Alemanno (2013). Israel now : reinventing the future (in Italian and English). Rome, London: Drago, Turnaround. ISBN 9788888493879. OCLC 823552837.
- Leila Nista; Rita Sassu; Gianni Alemanno (2011). Fostering the dialogue between citizens, civil society organisations, national and european institutions: an introduction to the year of voluntary activities promoting active citizenship. Roma: Quintilia. p. 394. ISBN 9788890030420. OCLC 898497270 – via archive.today/20190825134614/http://opac.regione.lazio.it/SebinaOpac/resource/fostering-the-dialogue-between-citizens-civil-society-organisations-national-and-europena-institutti/RL12754251 opac.regione.lazio.it].
- Antonio Rosario Mennonna; Gianfranco Ravasi; Gianni Alemanno; Giulio Andreotti (2008). Dialoghi con i personaggi dell'antica Roma. Galatina: M. Congedo. p. 206. ISBN 9788880868354. OCLC 821181879.
- Gianni Alemanno; Angelo Mellone (curator) (2002). Intervista sulla destra sociale. Gli specchi del presente (n. 52) (in Italian). Venezia: Marsilio. ISBN 9788831780827. OCLC 606832350 – via archive.today/20190825131549/https://www.worldcat.org/search?q=au:%22gianni+alemanno%22&qt=results_page archive.is].
- Gianni Alemanno (2005). Democrazia nel postglobal : religioni, generi, generazioni. Giustizia, ambiente, pace (in Italian). Bologna: EMI. p. 185. OCLC 60681771. (Proceedings of the conference of Orvieto (Terni) in 2004)
- Gianni Alemanno (2014). Il partito della nazione. I libri del Borghese (in Italian). Rome. p. 121. ISBN 9788875574369. OCLC 881826046.
- Silvano Scalabrella; Gianni Alemanno (2004). La dottrina sociale della Chiesa. Cultura di destra (n. 2) (in Italian). Rome: Nuove Idee. p. 136. ISBN 9788875570545. OCLC 895125214.

Political offices
Preceded by Alfonso Pecoraro Scanio	Italian Minister of Agriculture; 2001–2006	Succeeded by Paolo De Castro
Preceded by Walter Veltroni	Mayor of Rome; 2008–2013	Succeeded by Ignazio Marino
