= Brothers of Italy =

Brothers of Italy Fratelli d'Italia
- Abbreviation: FdI
- President: Giorgia Meloni
- Head of Political Secretariat: Arianna Meloni
- Organisational Secretary: Giovanni Donzelli
- Founders: Ignazio La Russa; Guido Crosetto; Giorgia Meloni
- Founded: 21 December 2012; 13 years ago
- Split from: The People of Freedom
- Preceded by: National Alliance (Note: Not direct predecessor. FdI was established mainly by former AN members, who had been part of the PdL in 2008–2012, and is the current bearer of AN's symbol under the authorisation of the National Alliance Foundation.)
- Headquarters: Via della Scrofa 39, Rome
- Newspaper: La Voce del Patriota
- Student wing: Student Action; University Action
- Youth wing: National Youth
- Membership (2024): 254,000
- Ideology: National conservatism; Right-wing populism; Post-fascism (Note: Some sources classify FdI as post-fascist, while others consider it neo-fascist.)
- Political position: Right-wing to far-right
- National affiliation: Centre-right coalition
- European affiliation: European Conservatives and Reformists Party
- European Parliament group: EPP Group (2012–2014); ECR Group (since 2019)
- International affiliation: International Democracy Union
- Colours: Blue
- Chamber of Deputies: 118 / 400
- Senate: 66 / 205
- European Parliament: 24 / 76
- Regional Councils: 182 / 896
- Conference of Regions: 3 / 21

Website
- fratelli-italia.it

Brothers of Italy (Italian: Fratelli d'Italia, (Note: Named after the first line of the Italian national anthem ("Il Canto degli Italiani")) FdI) is a national-conservative and right-wing populist political party in Italy, that is currently the country's ruling party. After becoming the largest party in the 2022 Italian general election, it consolidated as one of the two major political parties in Italy during the 2020s, along with the Democratic Party. The party is led by Giorgia Meloni, the incumbent Prime Minister of Italy. Meloni's tenure has been described as the "most right-wing" government in Italy since World War II, whilst her time in government is variously described as a shift towards the far-right in Italian politics.

In December 2012, FdI emerged from a right-wing split within The People of Freedom (PdL) party. The bulk of FdI's membership (including Meloni, who has led the party since 2014), and its symbol, the tricolour flame, hail from the National Alliance (AN), which was established in 1995 and merged into PdL in 2009. AN was the successor to the Italian Social Movement (MSI), a neo-fascist party active from 1946 to 1995. However, FdI is home also to several former Christian Democrats and half of its ministers are not former MSI members.

According to Meloni and leading members, FdI is a mainstream conservative party. Academics and observers have variously described it as conservative, national-conservative, social-conservative, right-wing populist, nationalist, neo-fascist, post-fascist, and nativist. The party espouses a Eurosceptic position, while being in favour of Atlanticism. While its MEPs were originally affiliated with the European People's Party Group, they left in 2014 and joined the European Conservatives and Reformists in 2019, which was led by Meloni from 2020 to 2025. FdI proposes a "confederal Europe" of nations as opposed to a "federal Europe".

== History ==
=== Background and foundation ===
In November 2012, Ignazio La Russa and Maurizio Gasparri, leaders of the Protagonist Right, a faction within The People of Freedom (PdL), announced their support for Angelino Alfano in the party primary scheduled for December. The subsequent cancellation of the primary was not agreed with by La Russa and many others in the party. On 16 December 2012, Giorgia Meloni, Fabio Rampelli, Guido Crosetto, and Giuseppe Cossiga organised in Rome the Primaries of Ideas, in which they openly criticised Silvio Berlusconi's leadership and any possible prospect of an electoral alliance with Prime Minister Mario Monti, proposed by some leading factions of the party, among them Liberamente, Network Italy, Reformism and Freedom, Liberal Populars, New Italy, and FareItalia.

On 17 December 2012, La Russa, one of the three PdL national coordinators, announced he was leaving the party to form the "National Centre-right" (Centrodestra Nazionale), including not just right-wingers but also Christian democrats and liberals from Forza Italia (FI) such as Crosetto and Cossiga. The split from the PdL was agreed with Berlusconi to better represent the Italian right and offer an appealing choice to right-wing voters. Simultaneously, Crosetto and Meloni announced the formation of "Brothers of Italy", whose name was taken from the first line of the Italian national anthem. On 21 December, the two groups, formed mainly by former members of National Alliance such as La Russa, Meloni, Rampelli, Massimo Corsaro, Viviana Beccalossi, and Alfredo Mantica, joined forces as "Brothers of Italy – National Centre-right", usually shortened to Brothers of Italy (FdI). La Russa's followers soon formed their own groups in most regional councils, starting with the Regional Council of Lombardy, and the Senate of the Republic. Carlo Fidanza and Marco Scurria, MEPs in the European People's Party group, also joined the party.

=== 2013 general election and aftermath ===
In the 2013 Italian general election, the party obtained 2.0% of the vote and won nine seats in the Chamber of Deputies. On 5 March 2013, the party's executive board appointed La Russa president, Crosetto coordinator, and Meloni leader in the Chamber of Deputies. During the 2013 Italian presidential election's fourth ballot on 19 April, FdI decided to support Franco Marini, a Democratic Party (PD) member supported also by PdL and Lega Nord (LN). Following the unsuccessful outcome of the vote, FdI started voting for colonel Sergio De Caprio, known for having arrested Sicilian Mafia boss Salvatore Riina. On 29 April, Meloni announced in the Chamber of Deputies the party's vote of no confidence for Enrico Letta's government, supported by PD, PdL, and Civic Choice.

In September 2013, FdI launched "Workshop for Italy" (Officina per l'Italia, abbr. OpI), a political initiative aimed at broadening the party's base. The newly formed OpI's political committee, led by Cossiga, included, among others, former minister of Foreign Affairs Giulio Terzi di Sant'Agata, former members of AN (notably including Gianni Alemanno, Mario Landolfi, Sergio Berlato, Adolfo Urso, and Souad Sbai), former members of FI (including former Socialists such as Giulio Tremonti and Antonio Guidi, and former Christian Democrats such as Fabio Garagnani), former members of the Union of the Centre (Magdi Allam and Luciano Ciocchetti), and a former member of the LN (Oreste Rossi). Alemanno's Italy First and Urso's FareItalia were to join FdI by February 2014.

=== National Alliance Foundation ===
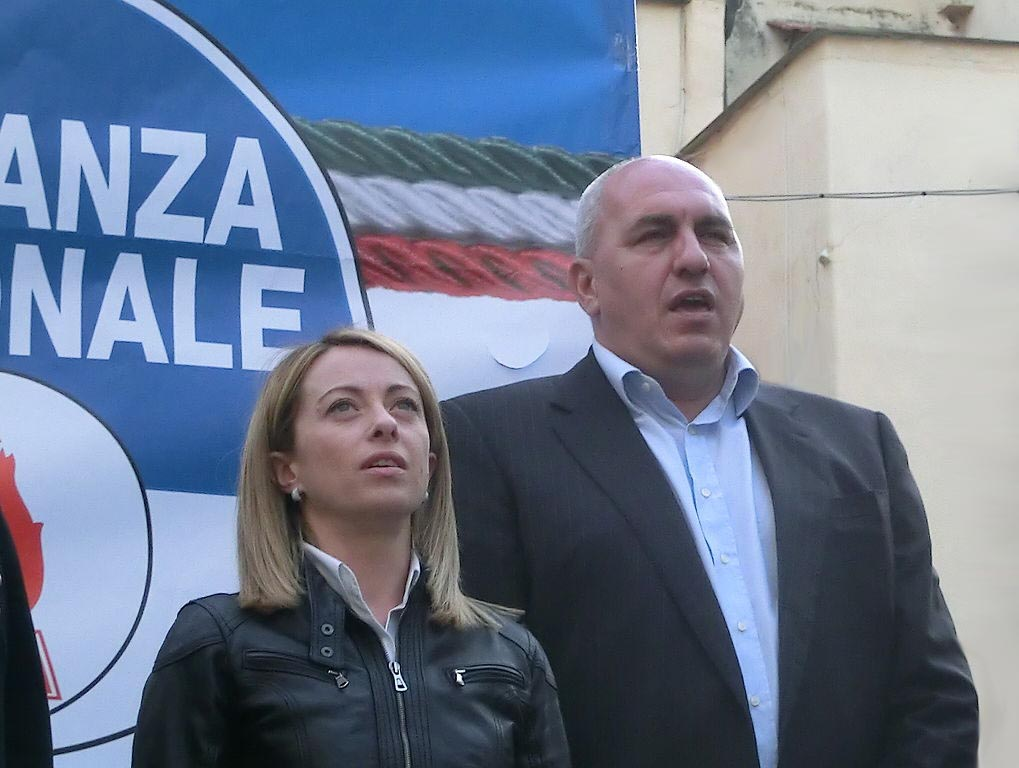
Giorgia Meloni and Guido Crosetto in 2014

In December 2013, the National Alliance Foundation, the association in charge of administering the assets of the defunct party, authorised FdI, supported by Alemanno and Urso, to use the logo of AN in the 2014 European Parliament election in Italy, despite opposition from the Movement for National Alliance alternative front composed of The Right, Future and Freedom, Tricolour Flame, I the South, and New Alliance, as well as the former members of AN who had joined FI such as senators Maurizio Gasparri and Altero Matteoli.

In February 2014, the party organised a primary in which members and supporters agreed to change the party's name to Brothers of Italy – National Alliance, chose the new symbol, including in small AN's one, and re-elected Meloni as president. During the party's first congress in March 2014, FdI ratified the primary's outcomes; the congress also voted for the party to leave the European People's Party Group in the European Parliament and adopt Eurosceptic positions. In the 2014 European Parliament election in Italy, FdI obtained 3.7% of the vote and no seats, while doing well in Central and Southern Italy, especially in Lazio (5.6%), Umbria (5.4%), Abruzzo (4.7%), and Campania (4.5%), as well as in north-eastern Friuli-Venezia Giulia (4.4%).

During an assembly of the association in October 2015, the representatives of FdI, supported by former AN heavyweights who had remained in the PdL, won a decisive vote over a front led by Alemanno, who had left FdI earlier, joined forces with former allies of Gianfranco Fini and wanted to form a larger party, including FdI, which retained the use of AN's name and symbol, while Alemanno announced that he would create a Movement for the United Right.

=== Road to the 2018 general election ===
In November 2015, it was announced that the party would undergo a new process of enlargement and that a new political committee, named Our Land (TN), would be launched by January 2016. TN would comprise FdI, along with other right-wing politicians, notably including Cossiga (former deputy of FI and founding member of FdI), Alberto Giorgetti (a deputy of FI, who was long a member of AN) and Walter Rizzetto (deputy of Free Alternative, originally elected with the Five Star Movement). In March 2016, Rizzetto officially joined FdI and it was announced that the party's group in the Chamber would be renamed Brothers of Italy–Our Land. The name change never happened, but the party's enlargement continued with the switch of two deputies from FI.

In the 2016 Rome municipal election, Meloni ran for mayor with the support of Us with Salvini but in competition with the candidate supported by FI. Meloni won 20.6% of the vote, almost twice than FI's candidate, but did not qualify for the run-off, while FdI obtained 12.3%. In the 2017 Sicilian regional election, Nello Musumeci, a conservative close to the party, was elected president of Sicily.

During the party's second congress in December 2017, Meloni was re-elected president, the party was renamed simply Brothers of Italy, and a new symbol was unveiled. In the event, FdI welcomed several newcomers, notably including Daniela Santanchè and Bruno Mancuso, respectively from FI and Popular Alternative (AP). Mancuso became the party's third senator after Stefano Bertacco, as well as Bartolomeo Amidei, had previously switched from FI. Additionally, Crosetto and Urso returned to an active role in the party. Finally, Alessandro Urzì led the Alto Adige in the Heart party into FdI.

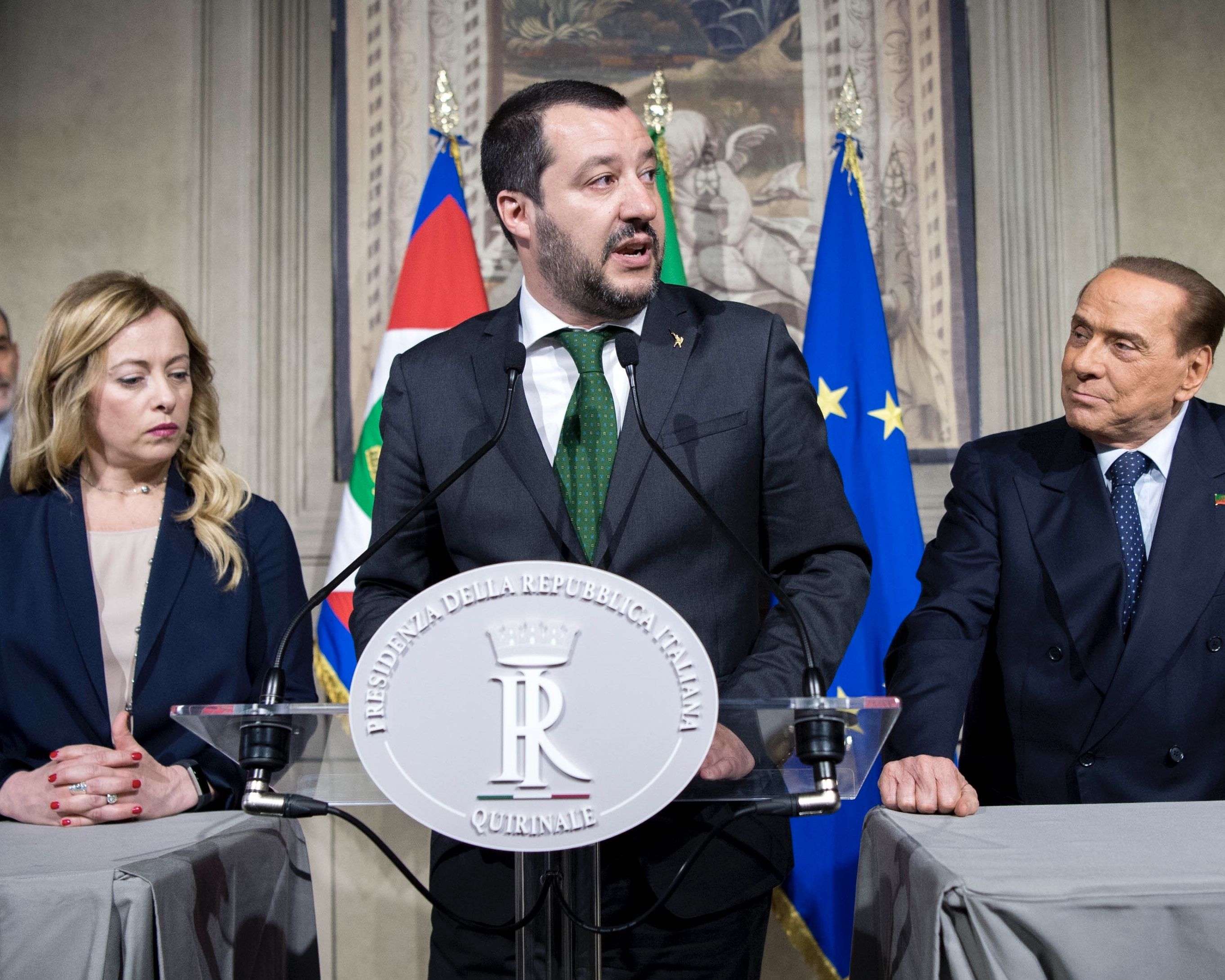
Meloni (left) with Matteo Salvini (centre) and Silvio Berlusconi (right) at the Quirinal Palace after the 2018 election

=== 2018 general election and aftermath ===
In the 2018 Italian general election, as part of the centre-right coalition, FdI obtained 4.4% of the vote and won more than three times the seats won in 2013. In November 2018, in the run-up to the 2019 European Parliament election in Italy, the party agreed to join the European Conservatives and Reformists (ECR) group in the European Parliament, opening the way for a pact with other minor conservative parties in Italy, notably including Raffaele Fitto's Direction Italy. On 29 October 2019, Direction Italy officially merged into FdI, and on 7 December 2019 the National Movement for Sovereignty of Roberto Menia and Gianni Alemanno merged into FdI. In 2020, other minor right-wing parties, such as Gabriella Peluso's Protagonist South and Lorenzo Loiacono's Right Bank, also merged into FdI.

Party member Marco Marsilio won 48.0% of the vote in the 2019 Abruzzo regional election and became FdI's first regional president on 10 February. Since governing the region, which ranked as the ninth-worst region by number of deaths per capita during the COVID-19 pandemic in Italy, critics said undermined access to abortion and privatised health care, FdI has made it harder for migrants to access social housing. Meloni reclaimed this by saying that "Italians first is not just a slogan." For the 2019 European Parliament election, FdI recruited several candidates, including five outgoing MEPs (two of Direction Italy, plus three more recent splinters from FI: Fabrizio Bertot, Stefano Maullu, and Elisabetta Gardini), other former FI politicians (Alfredo Antoniozzi and Monica Stefania Baldi), and sociologist Francesco Alberoni. FdI obtained 6.4% of the vote (10.3% in Calabria, 9.0% in Lazio, 8.9% in Apulia, and 8.4% in Basilicata) and five MEPs.

For the 2022 Italian presidential election on 24–29 January, FdI voted Carlo Nordio when all the other main parties proposed a re-election of incumbent president Sergio Mattarella. In April 2022, the party organised a large convention in Milan, to discuss its political program and start the campaign for the next general election.

=== Road to the 2022 general election ===
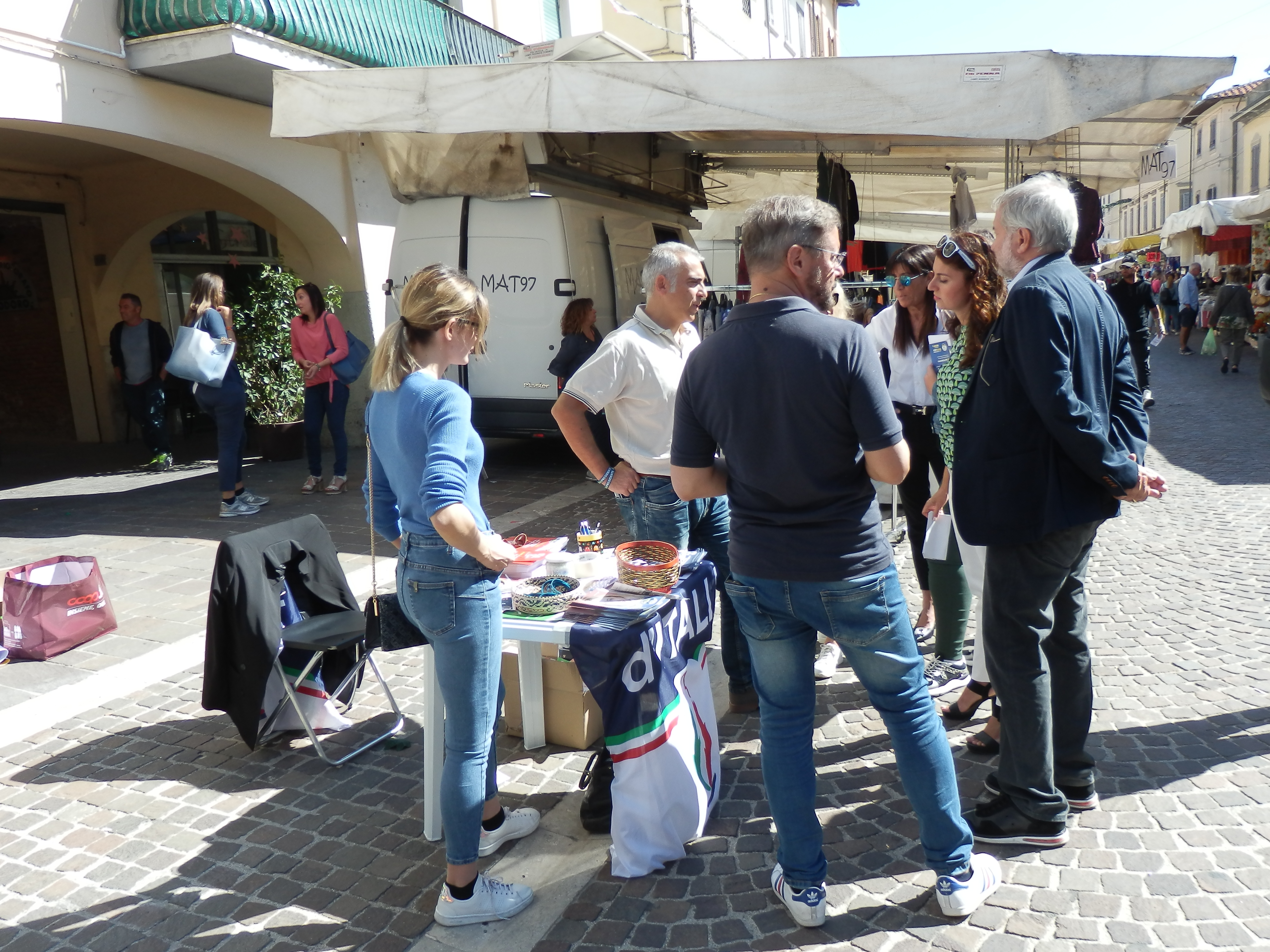
FdI volunteers canvassing in Cascina, Tuscany, three days before the 2022 general election; on the right Claudio Borghi Aquilini (League)

Heading into the 2022 Italian general election rising in the polls, a snap election that was called after the 2022 Italian government crisis, it was agreed among the centre-right coalition that the leader of the party receiving the most votes would become prime minister candidate. As of July 2022, FdI was first party in the coalition according to opinion polling, and she was widely expected to become Prime Minister of Italy if the centre-right coalition obtained an absolute majority in Parliament, which would be the most right-wing government in the history of the Italian Republic according to some academics.

In an attempt to moderate the party to placate fears among those who describe FdI as neo-fascist or far-right, including fears within the European Commission that she could lead Italy towards Hungary under Viktor Orbán, Meloni told the foreign press that Italian fascism is history. As president of the European Conservatives and Reformists Party, she said she shared the experiences and values of the Conservative Party in the United Kingdom, Likud in Israel, and the Republican Party in the United States.

=== 2022 general election and aftermath ===
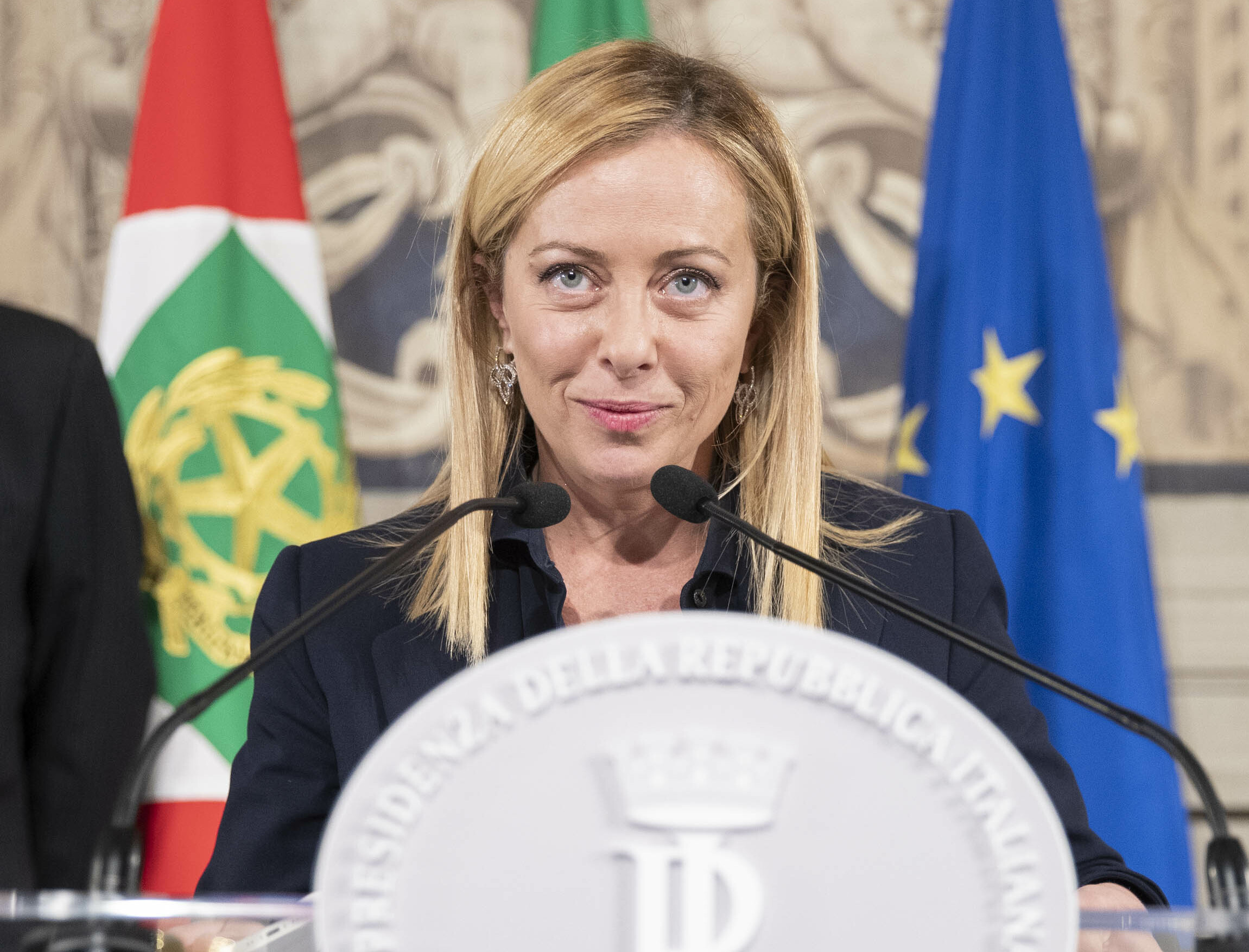
Giorgia Meloni at the Quirinal Palace accepting the task of forming a new government

In the run-up to the election, several politicians previously affiliated with Berlusconi's FI joined the FdI electoral lists. Notably, they included Giulio Tremonti (ex-PSI and ex-FI, former finance minister), Marcello Pera (ex-PSI and ex-FI, former president of the Senate), Antonio Guidi (ex-PSI and ex-FI, former family and social solidarity minister), Giulio Terzi di Sant'Agata (former foreign affairs minister, honorary president of the PRT), Carlo Nordio (former prosecutor, member of the PLI), and Eugenia Roccella (a former Radical and feminist who later turned into a conservative feminist), among others. General election candidate Calogero Pisano was sacked after praising Adolf Hitler. While he remained a candidate, FdI removed its symbol from his candidature; he was elected in the single-district constituency of Agrigento, Sicilia with 37.8% of the vote. In one of Rome's single-seat constituencies, Ester Mieli, a former spokesperson of the local Jewish community and granddaughter of a Holocaust survivor, was elected with 37.5% of the vote.

In a record-low voter turnout election, exit polls projected that the centre-right coalition would win a majority of seats in the 2022 general election. Meloni was projected to be the winner of the election with FdI receiving a plurality of seats, and per agreement with the centre-right coalition, which held that the largest party in the coalition would nominate the next prime minister, she is the favourite to become Prime Minister and would be the country's first woman to hold the office. On 13 October, the new parliamentary term started and FdI's La Russa was elected President of the Senate of the Republic; he is the first politician with a neo-fascist background and to come from a post-fascist party to hold the position, which is the second highest-ranking office of the Italian Republic.

After customary talks among the parties and the president, Sergio Mattarella, as part of the 2022 Italian government formation on 20–21 October, Meloni accepted the task of forming a new government and announced the Meloni government, which assumed official functions after each ministers were sworn in on 22 October. It was variously described as a shift to the political right, and the first far-right-led coalition, as well as its first far-right leader, since the Second World War. Other than Meloni, the government included 9 FdI ministers, notably including Nordio at Justice, Crosetto at Defense, and Urso at Economic Development. The Meloni government successfully won the confidence votes on 25–26 October with a comfortable majority in both houses of the Italian Parliament.

During the annual party convention, named after Michael Ende's character Atreju, which took place in December 2023, international guests included British Prime Minister Rishi Sunak, Albanian Prime Minister Edi Rama, Spanish right-wing leader Santiago Abascal and businessman Elon Musk.

In the 2024 European Parliament election, Meloni led the party in all five constituencies, after presenting the event as a vote of confidence on her leadership and government. Differently from other parties, FdI privileged party stalwarts over signature candidates. A rare exception was the inclusion of Vittorio Sgarbi, whose candidacy would not succeed. FdI came in first place in the election, winning 28.9% of the vote and 24 seats, ahead of the PD and centre-right coalition partners. Meloni, who was a candidate in all five constituencies, received 2.3 million preferences votes and was the most voted individual in the election. The second most voted candidate in the party was Nicola Procaccini, outgoing chairman of the European Conservatives and Reformists group.

In September 2024, FdI was admitted into the International Democracy Union.

== Ideology and factions ==
Academics and political commentators have variously described FdI's political position as right-wing, radical right, as well as far-right. The party has been characterised as conservative, national-conservative, social-conservative, right-wing populist, nationalist, neo-fascist, post-fascist, and nativist. Although FdI rejects the "neo-fascist" label, it has been applied due to the party's history dating back to the Italian Social Movement (MSI), its far-right ties, its appeal to neo-fascist themes on social media such as Facebook, and some party leaders' nostalgia for Italian fascism, including Roman salutes. Some party members have celebrated Benito Mussolini, with fascist memorabilia in some local offices. Some members of the Mussolini family have run for FdI, such as Rachele Mussolini, granddaughter of Mussolini, for the City Council of Rome, and Caio Giulio Cesare Mussolini, great-grandson of Mussolini, for the 2019 European Parliament election.

In 2019, academic Đorđe Sredanović placed FdI, along with the neo-fascist parties CasaPound (a split from Tricolour Flame, which refused to join the National Alliance) and New Force (FN) from the Terza Posizione tradition, in the post-fascist/neo-fascist categories. In October 2021, FdI distanced itself from FN after they violently assaulted the labour union Italian General Confederation of Labour's headquarters; the party abstained on a parliamentary motion to ban FN while condemning "all totalitarianisms". A December 2021 investigation by Fanpage.it on allegations of money laundering and illicit campaign financing also revealed FdI had ties with neo-Nazis in the Milan party section. Meloni told Corriere della Sera there were no "nostalgic fascists, racists or antisemites in the Brothers of Italy DNA" and that she had always got rid of "ambiguous people", and in other interviews she said there was no place for fascist nostalgia in FdI.

On economic issues, the party takes inspiration from both the economic interventionism of Social Right and the economic liberalism of Reaganomics, advocating tax cuts and workfare schemes. In opposition, the party advocated more protectionist measures.

In regards to social issues, the party opposes euthanasia and abortion. It also has been described as being strictly "anti-gay marriage" and supporting the "traditional family unit". The party collaborates with anti-abortion and anti-LGBTQ+ movements. FdI's MEPs voted against the resolution proposed by the European Citizens' Initiative (ECI), "My voice, my choice", a project that wanted to provide support, including financial support, to member states in providing access to abortion for anyone in Europe who does not have full access to abortion yet. FdI calls for a zero-tolerance policy on illegal immigration and wants to blockade migrants from reaching Italian ports and boost the birth rate of Italian nationals to ease the need for migrant labour. FdI, frequently described as Eurosceptic, aims at a "confederal Europe" of sovereign nations as opposed to a "federal Europe", and wants to "re-discuss" European Union treaties and amend Italy's constitution to give Italian law priority over European law. Once in favour of withdrawing from the eurozone, the party abandoned the idea. Prior to the start of the 2022 Russian invasion of Ukraine, the party was in favour of better relations with Russia while maintaining a pro-NATO stance. Since then, it has condemned the invasion and promised to send arms to Ukraine, and Meloni moved the party towards Atlantism. Besides being a leading member of the European Conservatives and Reformists Party, FdI has ties with the Conservative Party in the United Kingdom, Likud in Israel, and the Republican Party in the United States, where Meloni has been a guest at the CPAC Conference in February 2022.

FdI had several organised internal factions, including a minor liberal-conservative faction. It has also been stated that some internal wings of the party have ties to the neo-fascism movement.
Factions include:

- Italy First (Prima l'Italia, PI), national-conservative, led by Gianni Alemanno (until 2015, later joined National Action)
- FareItalia (FI, lit. 'Make Italy'), liberal-conservative, led by Adolfo Urso
- I Love Italy (Io Amo l'Italia, IAI), social-conservative, led by Magdi Allam (until 2015)
- I the South (Io Sud, IS), national-conservative and centrist, led by Adriana Poli Bortone (until 2015, later joined Forza Italia)
- National Movement for Sovereignty (Movimento Nazionale per la Sovranità, MNS), national-conservative, led by Gianni Alemanno
- Direction Italy (Direzione Italia, DI), liberal-conservative, led by Raffaele Fitto

Alemanno and Poli Bortone left FdI, along with their factions, in December 2014 and April 2015, respectively. In December 2019, Alemanno returned through the MNS.

In June 2024, a Fanpage.it journalist infiltrated a Roman section of the party's youth organisation "National Youth". The resulting investigation showed how militants frequently use the Nazi slogan "Sieg Heil!", make fascist salutes and praise Benito Mussolini. The organisation is said to have a policy of masking all these aspects publicly, while in private they are tolerated and promoted.

== Election results ==
=== Italian Parliament ===
Election	Leader	Chamber of Deputies					Senate of the Republic				
Election	Leader	Votes	%	Seats	+/–	Position	Votes	%	Seats	+/–	Position
2013	Giorgia Meloni	666,035	1.9	9 / 630	New	8th	590,083	1.9	0 / 315	New	7th
2018	Giorgia Meloni	1,429,550	4.4	32 / 630	▲23	▲5th	1,286,606	4.3	18 / 315	▲18	▲5th
2022	Giorgia Meloni	7,302,517	26.0	119 / 400	▲87	▲1st	7,167,136	26.0	66 / 200	▲48	▲1st

=== European Parliament ===
Election	Leader	Votes	%	Seats	+/–	Position	EP Group
2014	Giorgia Meloni	1,004,037	3.7	0 / 73	New	7th	–
2019	Giorgia Meloni	1,726,189	6.4	6 / 76	▲6	▲5th	ECR
2024	Giorgia Meloni	6,732,303	28.8	24 / 76	▲18	▲1st	ECR

=== Regional councils ===
Region	Election year	Votes	%	Seats	+/−	Status in legislature
Aosta Valley	2025	6,634 (3rd)	10.99	4 / 35	▲4	Opposition
Piedmont	2024	403,954 (1st)	24.43	11 / 51	▲9	Majority
Lombardy	2023	725,402 (1st)	25.18	22 / 80	▲19	Majority
South Tyrol	2023	16,747 (5th)	5.96	2 / 35	▲1	Majority
Trentino	2023	28,714 (3rd)	12.35	5 / 35	▲5	Majority
Veneto	2025	312,839 (2nd)	18.69	9 / 51	▲4	Majority
Friuli-Venezia Giulia	2023	71,503 (2nd)	18.10	8 / 49	▲6	Majority
Emilia-Romagna	2024	354,833 (2nd)	23.74	11 / 50	▲8	Opposition
Liguria	2024	84,816 (2nd)	15.08	5 / 31	▲2	Majority
Tuscany	2025	340,202 (2nd)	26.78	13 / 41	▲9	Opposition
Marche	2025	155,540 (1st)	27.41	11 / 31	▲3	Majority
Umbria	2024	62,419 (2nd)	19.44	3 / 21	▲1	Opposition
Lazio	2023	519,633 (1st)	33.62	22 / 51	▲19	Majority
Abruzzo	2024	139,578 (1st)	24.10	9 / 31	▲6	Majority
Molise	2023	26,649 (1st)	18.85	4 / 21	▲3	Majority
Campania	2025	239,733 (2nd)	11.93	7 / 51	Steady	Opposition
Apulia	2025	248,904 (2nd)	18.73	11 / 51	▲4	Opposition
Basilicata	2024	45,458 (1st)	17.39	4 / 21	▲3	Majority
Calabria	2025	88,335 (4th)	11.64	4 / 31	Steady	Majority
Sicily	2022	282,345 (1st)	15.10	13 / 70	▲10	Majority
Sardinia	2024	93,122 (2nd)	13.60	8 / 60	▲5	Opposition

== Leadership ==
- President: Giorgia Meloni, Ignazio La Russa, Guido Crosetto (2012–2013), Ignazio La Russa (2013–2014), Giorgia Meloni (2014–present)
  - Coordinator: Guido Crosetto (2013–2014), Giovanni Donzelli (2015–2017), Guido Crosetto (2018–2019)
  - Head of Political Secretariat: Arianna Meloni (2023–present)
  - Organisational Secretary: Giovanni Donzelli (2022–present)
  - Administrative Secretary (treasurer): Pierfrancesco Gamba (2013–2014), Pasquale Maietta (2014), Marco Marsilio (2014–2018), Roberto Carlo Mele (2018–present)
  - Coordinator of the Political Committee of Workshop for Italy: Giuseppe Cossiga (2013–2014)
- President of the National Assembly: Ignazio La Russa (2014–present)
- Coordinator of the National Board: Edmondo Cirielli (2018–present)
- Leader in the Chamber of Deputies: Giorgia Meloni (2013–2014), Fabio Rampelli (2014–2018), Francesco Lollobrigida (2018–2022), Tommaso Foti (2022–2024), Galeazzo Bignami (2024–present)
- Leader in the Senate: Maria Alessandra Gallone (2012–2013), Stefano Bertacco (2017–2018), Luca Ciriani (2018–2022), Lucio Malan (2022–present)
- Leader in the European Parliament: Carlo Fidanza (2019–present)

== See also ==
- List of political parties in Italy

== Bibliography ==
- Benveniste, Annie; Campani, Giovanna; Lazaridis, Gabriella (2016). The Rise of the Far Right in Europe: Populist Shifts and 'Othering'. Springer. ISBN 978-1-1375-5679-0 – via Google Books.
- Bosworth, R. J. B. (2021). Mussolini and the Eclipse of Italian Fascism: From Dictatorship to Populism. Yale University Press. ISBN 978-0-3002-5582-9 – via Google Books.
- Campani, Giovanna; Lazaridis, Gabriella (2016). Understanding the Populist Shift: Othering in a Europe in Crisis. Taylor & Francis. ISBN 978-1-3173-2606-9 – via Google Books.
- Jones, Kay Bea; Pilat, Stephanie (2020). The Routledge Companion to Italian Fascist Architecture: Reception and Legacy. Routledge. ISBN 978-1-0000-6144-4 – via Google Books.
- Kuhar, Roman; Paternotte, David (2017). Anti-Gender Campaigns in Europe: Mobilizing against Equality. Rowman & Littlefield. ISBN 978-1-7866-0001-1 – via Google Books.
- Mammone, Andrea (2015). Transnational Neofascism in France and Italy. Cambridge University Press. ISBN 978-1-1070-3091-6 – via Google Books.
- Papakostas, Nikolaos; Pasamitros, Nikolaos (2016). EU: Beyond the Crisis: A Debate on Sustainable Integrationism. Columbia University Press. ISBN 978-3-8382-6848-4 – via Google Books.
- Russell, Eric Louis (2019). The Discursive Ecology of Homophobia: Unravelling Anti-LGBTQ Speech on the European Far Right. Multilingual Matters. ISBN 978-1-7889-2347-7 – via Google Books.
