= Second Conte government =

66th government of the Italian Republic

- 66th Cabinet of Italy

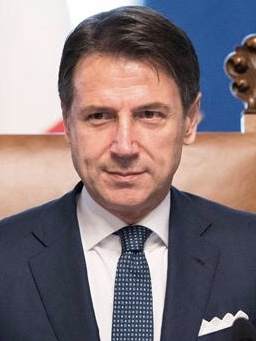
- Date formed: 5 September 2019
- Date dissolved: 13 February 2021 (528 days)

People and organisations
- Head of state: Sergio Mattarella
- Head of government: Giuseppe Conte
- No. of ministers: 21 (including Prime Minister)
- Ministers removed: 3 resigned
- Total no. of members: 24
- Member parties: M5S, PD, LeU (Art.1–SI), IV (18 September 2019–14 January 2021)
- Status in legislature: Coalition (Majority)
- Opposition parties: Lega, FI, FdI, IV (since 14 January 2021)

History
- Incoming formation: 2019 government formation
- Election: 2018 election
- Legislature term: XVIII Legislature (2018–2022)
- Predecessor: First Conte government
- Successor: Draghi government

The second Conte government was the 66th government of the Italian Republic and the second government led by Giuseppe Conte. The government was sworn in on 5 September 2019, and lasted until 13 February 2021. The second Conte government had the lowest average age of its members in the history of the Italian Republic.

The government was supported by the anti-establishment and populist Five Star Movement (M5S) and the centre-left Democratic Party (PD), along with the left-wing parliamentary group Free and Equal (LeU). On 17 September 2019, the centrist party Italia Viva (IV), which splintered from the PD on that day, announced its support for the coalition government. The government was referred to as the "yellow-red government" (governo giallorosso), based on the customary colours of the main supporting parties.

On 13 January 2021, after weeks of disagreements within the government coalition, the two ministers of IV resigned from their posts. Having lost the full support of one of the parties forming the government, Prime Minister Conte resigned on 26 January 2021.

== Supporting parties ==
=== Beginning of term ===
At the time of the government formation, its ministers and other members were part of the following three parties.

Party	Main ideology	Leader
Five Star Movement (M5S)	Populism	Luigi Di Maio
Democratic Party (PD)	Social democracy	Nicola Zingaretti
Free and Equal (LeU) (Note: Political alliance between Article One (led by Roberto Speranza) and Italian Left (led by Claudio Grassi).)	Democratic socialism	Several leaders

The government also obtained the support of the Associative Movement of Italians Abroad (MAIE), and one of its senators, Ricardo Merlo, was appointed as undersecretary in the government. The government received also the external support of the following minor parties: Popular Civic List (CP), the Italian Socialist Party (PSI), Italia in Comune (IiC), the South Tyrolean People's Party (SVP) and the Trentino Tyrolean Autonomist Party (PATT).

=== 2019–2021 ===
Party	Main ideology	Leader
Five Star Movement (M5S)	Populism	Vito Crimi (acting)
Democratic Party (PD)	Social democracy	Nicola Zingaretti
Italia Viva (IV)	Liberalism	Matteo Renzi
Free and Equal (LeU) (Note: Political alliance between Article One (led by Roberto Speranza) and Italian Left (led by Nicola Fratoianni).)	Democratic socialism	Several leaders

On 17 September 2019, former Prime Minister Matteo Renzi led a breakaway group outside the PD and formed Italia Viva, which confirmed its support to the government.

=== End of term ===
Party	Main ideology	Leader
Five Star Movement (M5S)	Populism	Vito Crimi (acting)
Democratic Party (PD)	Social democracy	Nicola Zingaretti
Free and Equal (LeU) (Note: Political alliance between Article One (led by Roberto Speranza) and Italian Left (led by Nicola Fratoianni).)	Democratic socialism	Several leaders

On 13 January 2021, former Prime Minister Matteo Renzi announced the withdrawal of his party’s support to the government.

== History ==
=== Background ===
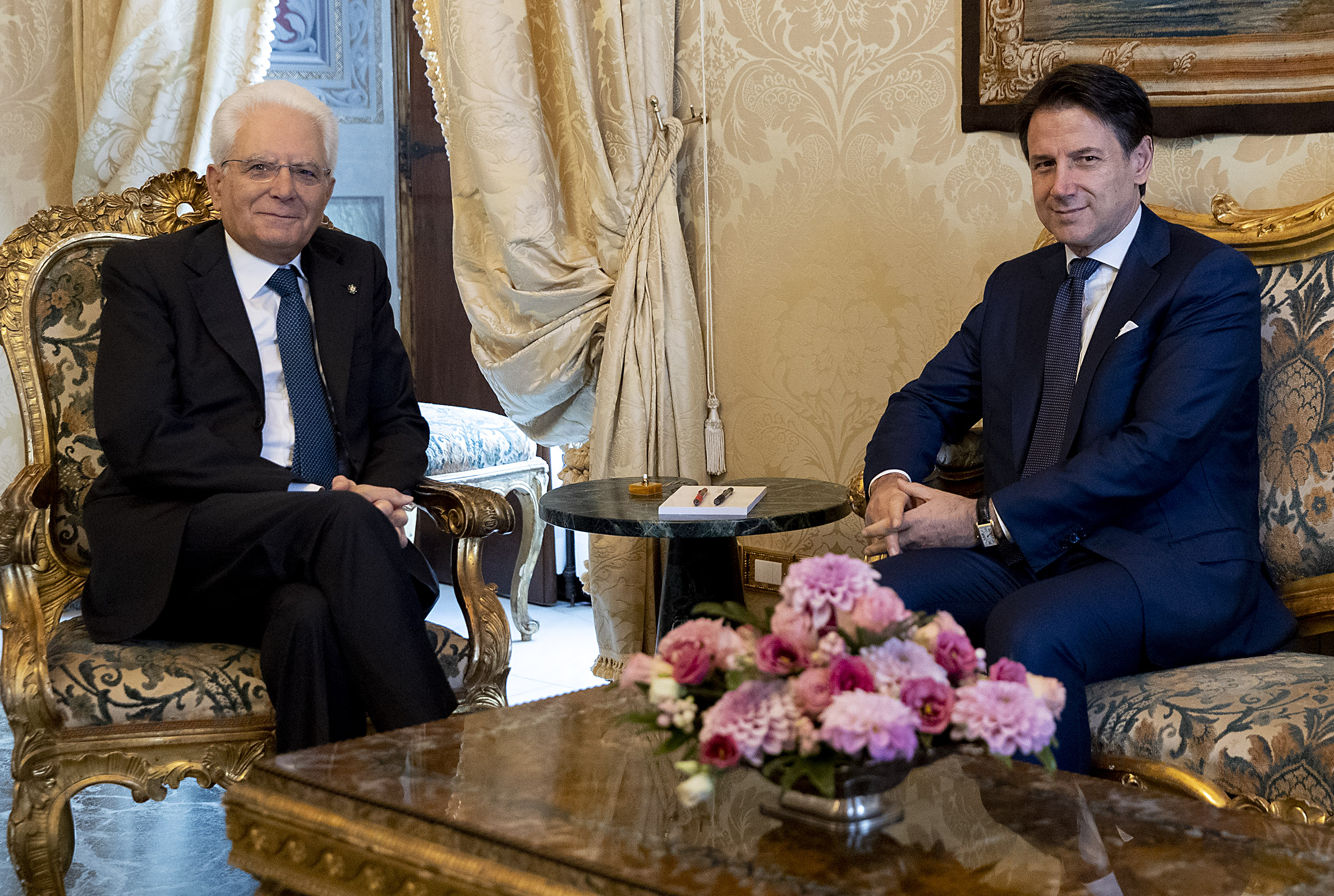
Conte with President Sergio Mattarella at the Quirinal Palace in August 2019

After the 2018 general election the Five Star Movement (M5S), which had come first in the election, and the League (Lega) agreed to form a coalition government led by Giuseppe Conte, the first Conte government. In August 2019, Matteo Salvini, Deputy Prime Minister and leader of Lega, announced a motion of no confidence against the government, after growing tensions within the majority. Salvini's move came right after a vote in the Senate regarding the progress of the Turin–Lyon high-speed railway, in which Lega, along with the largest opposition parties, voted against an attempt of the M5S to block the construction works. Many political analysts believe the no confidence motion was an attempt to force early elections to improve his party's standing in Parliament, due to its increasing support in opinion polls, ensuring Salvini could become the next prime minister. On 20 August, following the parliamentary debate in which Conte harshly accused Salvini of being a political opportunist who "had triggered the political crisis only to serve his personal interest", the Prime Minister tendered his resignation to President Sergio Mattarella.

=== Government formation ===
On 21 August, Mattarella started consultations with parliamentary groups. On the same day, the national board of the Democratic Party (PD) officially and unanimously opened to the prospect of a government with the M5S, based on pro-Europeanism, green economy, sustainable development, fight against economic inequality and a new immigration policy. However, the talks resulted in a unclear outcome, the President announced a second round of consultations starting on 27 August.

Negotiations between PD and M5S started, while Free and Equal (LeU), a left-wing parliamentary group, announced its support too. On 28 August, PD's leader Nicola Zingaretti announced at the Quirinal Palace his favourable position on forming a new government with the Five Stars with Conte at its head. On same day, Mattarella summoned Conte to the Quirinal Palace for 29 August to give him the task of forming a new government. On 3 September, M5S members voted through the so-called "Rousseau Platform" in favor of an agreement with the PD, with Conte Prime Minister, with more than 79% of the vote out of nearly 80,000 voters.

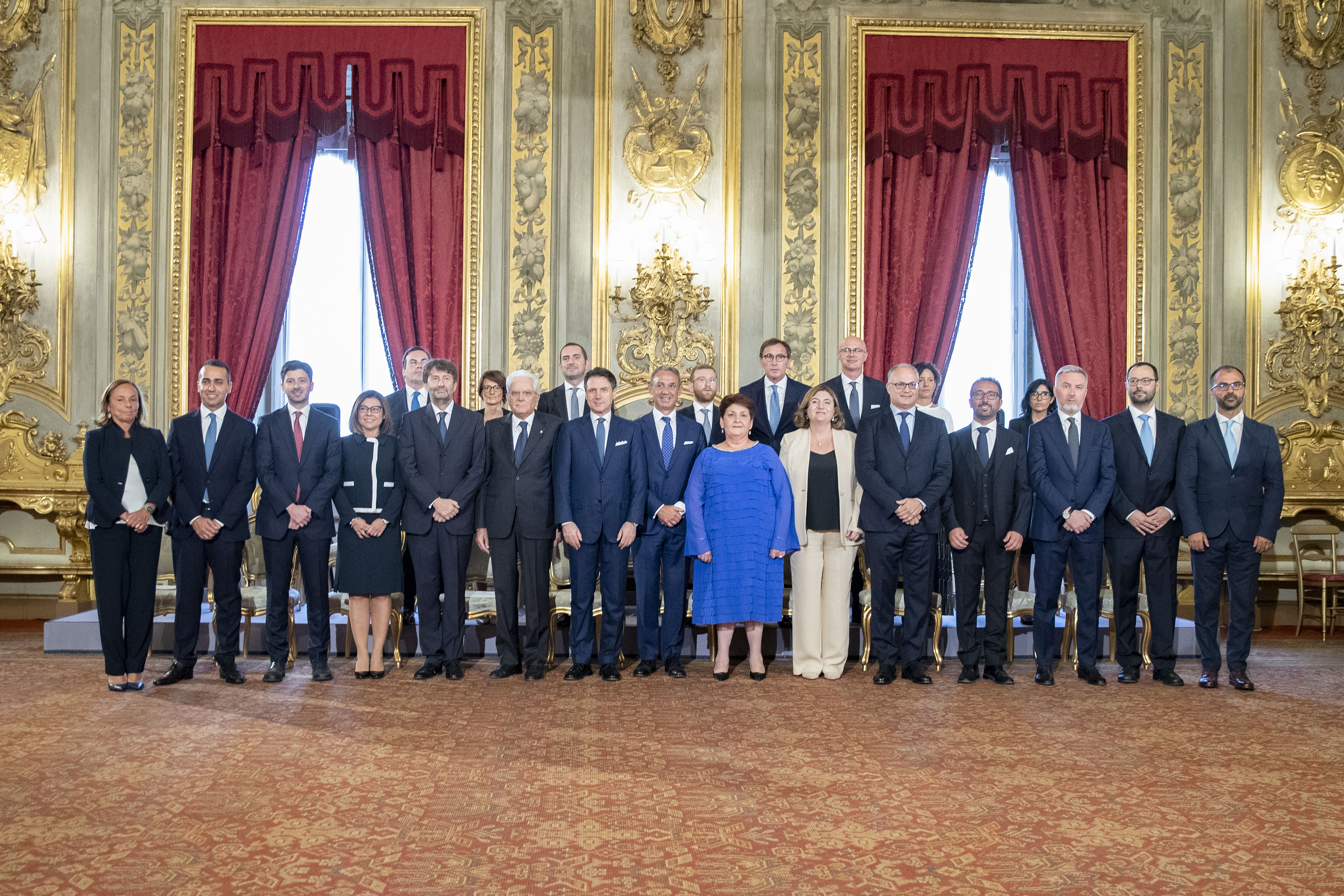
The government at the Quirinal Palace for the oath

On 4 September Conte announced the ministers of this new government, which was sworn in on the following day. At its start, the government was composed of 21 ministers, 14 men and 7 women, a majority of whom were from Southern Italy.

=== Investiture votes ===
On 9 September 2019 the Chamber of Deputies approved the government with 343 votes in favour, 263 against and 3 abstentions. On the following day the Senate followed suit, with 169 in favour, 133 against and 5 abstentions.

9–10 September 2019 Investiture votes for Conte II Cabinet
House of Parliament	Vote	Parties	Votes
Chamber of Deputies (Present: 609 (Note: Absent (16): FI (4), Lega (3), M5S (3), PD (2), FdI (1), Others (3) On institutional leave (4): M5S (4)) of 630, Majority: 304)	Yes	M5S (208), PD (109), LeU (14), CP–AP–PSI–AC (4), +Eu–CD (3), Others (5)	343 / 609
Chamber of Deputies (Present: 609 of 630, Majority: 304)	No	Lega (121), FI (95), FdI (33), NcI–USEI (4), Others (10)	263 / 609
Chamber of Deputies (Present: 609 of 630, Majority: 304)	Abstention	SVP–PATT (3)	3 / 609
Senate of the Republic (Present: 307 (Note: Absent (8): FI (5), M5S (1), Others (2) On institutional leave (5): M5S (1), PD (1), Lega (1), Aut (1), Others (1) President (1)) of 321, Majority: 152)	Yes	M5S (104), PD (49), Aut (4), LeU (4), Others (8)	169 / 307
Senate of the Republic (Present: 307 of 321, Majority: 152)	No	Lega (57), FI (56), FdI (18), +Eu (1), Others (1)	133 / 307
Senate of the Republic (Present: 307 of 321, Majority: 152)	Abstention	Aut (3), M5S (1), PD (1)	5 / 307

=== Italia Viva and M5S crises ===
In September 2019 former Prime Minister Matteo Renzi lead a split from the PD, and formed a party called Italia Viva. The new party had two ministers (Teresa Bellanova and Elena Bonetti) and one undersecretary, and kept its support for the Conte II government. In December 2019, the Minister of Education and Research, Lorenzo Fioramonti, resigned after disagreements with the rest of the cabinet regarding the recently approved 2020 budget bill. Fioramonti considered the share of funds dedicated to education and research to be insufficient. For the designation of the new Minister, Prime Minister Conte decided to split the Ministry of Education, University and Research into two. The Ministry of Public Education went to the former undersecretary Lucia Azzolina (M5S), whereas the Ministry of University and Research went to the dean of the University of Naples Federico II, Gaetano Manfredi (Ind). In January 2020, the Five Star Movement suffered multiple parliamentary defections and a sizeable decrease in popularity with respect to the 2018 elections. Luigi Di Maio resigned from his position as M5S political leader, retaining his position as foreign minister.

=== Coronavirus outbreak ===
In February 2020, the COVID-19 pandemic was confirmed to have spread to northern Italian regions. In a few weeks, it spread to the rest of the country, with major concentration of cases in the regions of Lombardy, Emilia-Romagna, Piedmont and Veneto. The government faced the subsequent health crisis by imposing gradually stricter measures of social distancing and quarantine, until a nationwide lockdown was imposed on 9 March, restricting the movement of people except for reasons of necessity, health, or work.

=== January 2021 political crisis ===
On 13 January 2021, after weeks of disagreements between IV and the rest of the government regarding the handling of the Next Generation EU funds, all three cabinet members of IV (Minister of Agriculture Teresa Bellanova, Minister of Family Elena Bonetti and Undersecretary for Economy Ivan Scalfarotto) resigned from their posts. Having lost the full support of one of the parties forming the government, Prime Minister Conte narrowly won a confidence vote at the Senate with a 156–140 tally, including 16 abstention votes from the IV senators, falling short of the absolute majority of 161 votes. As a result of the vote, and unable to find enough votes in Parliament to move ahead with the incumbent government, on 26 January 2021 Conte tended his resignations to President Sergio Mattarella, who asked him to stay in office to handle current affairs (as is customary in Italian politics).

== Party breakdown ==
=== Beginning of term ===
==== Ministers ====
- Five Star Movement
9
- Democratic Party
9
- Free and Equal
1
- Independents
3

==== Ministers and other members ====
- Five Star Movement (M5S): 9 ministers, 6 deputy ministers, 16 undersecretaries
- Democratic Party (PD): 9 ministers, 4 deputy ministers, 14 undersecretaries
- Free and Equal (LeU): 1 ministers, 2 undersecretaries
  - Article One (Art.1): 1 minister, 1 undersecretary
  - Italian Left (SI): 1 undersecretary
- Associative Movement Italians Abroad (MAIE): 1 undersecretary
- Independents: Prime minister, 2 ministers

=== 2019–2021 ===
==== Ministers ====
- Five Star Movement
9
- Democratic Party
7
- Italia Viva
2
- Free and Equal
1
- Independents
4

==== Ministers and other members ====
- Five Star Movement (M5S): 9 ministers, 6 deputy ministers, 15 undersecretaries
- Democratic Party (PD): 7 ministers, 4 deputy ministers, 13 undersecretaries
- Italia Viva (IV): 2 ministers, 1 undersecretary
- Free and Equal (LeU): 1 ministers, 2 undersecretaries
  - Article One (Art.1): 1 minister, 1 undersecretary
  - Italian Left (SI): 1 undersecretary
- Associative Movement Italians Abroad (MAIE): 1 undersecretary
- Independents: Prime minister, 3 ministers

=== End of term ===
==== Ministers ====
- Five Star Movement
9
- Democratic Party
7
- Free and Equal
1
- Independents
4

==== Ministers and other members ====
- Five Star Movement (M5S): 9 ministers, 6 deputy ministers, 15 undersecretaries
- Democratic Party (PD): 7 ministers, 4 deputy ministers, 13 undersecretaries
- Free and Equal (LeU): 1 minister, 2 undersecretaries
  - Article One (Art.1): 1 minister, 1 undersecretary
  - Italian Left (SI): 1 undersecretary
- Associative Movement Italians Abroad (MAIE): 1 undersecretary
- Independents: Prime minister, 3 ministers, 1 undersecretary

== Geographical breakdown ==
=== Beginning of term ===
A choropleth map showing the number of ministers from each region of Italy

- Northern Italy: 8 ministers
  - Emilia-Romagna: 2 ministers
  - Lombardy: 2 ministers
  - Piedmont: 2 ministers
  - Friuli-Venezia Giulia: 1 minister
  - Veneto: 1 minister
- Central Italy: 2 ministers
  - Lazio: 2 ministers
- Southern and Insular Italy: 12 ministers (including Conte)
  - Campania: 4 ministers
  - Apulia: 3 ministers (including Conte)
  - Sicily: 3 ministers
  - Basilicata: 2 ministers

=== 2019–2021 ===
- Northern Italy: 8 ministers
  - Emilia-Romagna: 2 ministers
  - Lombardy: 2 ministers
  - Piedmont: 2 ministers
  - Friuli-Venezia Giulia: 1 minister
  - Veneto: 1 minister
- Central Italy: 1 minister
  - Lazio: 1 minister
- Southern and Insular Italy: 14 ministers (including Conte)
  - Campania: 5 ministers
  - Sicily: 4 ministers
  - Apulia: 3 ministers (including Conte)
  - Basilicata: 2 ministers

=== End of term ===
- Northern Italy: 6 ministers
  - Piedmont: 2 ministers
  - Emilia-Romagna: 1 minister
  - Friuli-Venezia Giulia: 1 minister
  - Lombardy: 1 minister
  - Veneto: 1 minister
- Central Italy: 1 minister
  - Lazio: 1 minister
- Southern and Insular Italy: 14 ministers (including Conte)
  - Campania: 5 ministers
  - Sicily: 4 ministers
  - Apulia: 3 ministers (including Conte)
  - Basilicata: 2 ministers

== Council of Ministers ==
The Council of Ministers was composed of the following members:

Office	Name	Party	Term
Prime Minister	Giuseppe Conte	Independent (Note: Proposed by the Five Star Movement.)	2019–2021
Minister of Foreign Affairs	Luigi Di Maio	Five Star Movement	2019–2021
Minister of the Interior	Luciana Lamorgese	Independent	2019–2021
Minister of Justice	Alfonso Bonafede	Five Star Movement	2019–2021
Minister of Defence	Lorenzo Guerini	Democratic Party	2019–2021
Minister of Economy and Finance	Roberto Gualtieri	Democratic Party	2019–2021
Minister of Economic Development	Stefano Patuanelli	Five Star Movement	2019–2021
Minister of Agriculture	Teresa Bellanova	Democratic Party / Italia Viva	2019–2021
Minister of the Environment	Sergio Costa	Independent	2019–2021
Minister of Infrastructure and Transport	Paola De Micheli	Democratic Party	2019–2021
Minister of Labour and Social Policies	Nunzia Catalfo	Five Star Movement	2019–2021
Minister of Education, University and Research	Lorenzo Fioramonti	Five Star Movement	2019
Minister of Education, University and Research	Lucia Azzolina (Public Education)	Five Star Movement	2020–2021
Minister of Education, University and Research	Gaetano Manfredi (University and Research)	Independent	2020–2021
Minister of Cultural Heritage and Activities	Dario Franceschini	Democratic Party	2019–2021
Minister of Health	Roberto Speranza	Free and Equal (Art.1)	2019–2021
Minister for Parliamentary Relations	Federico D'Incà	Five Star Movement	2019–2021
Minister of Public Administration	Fabiana Dadone	Five Star Movement	2019–2021
Minister of Regional Affairs	Francesco Boccia	Democratic Party	2019–2021
Minister for the South	Giuseppe Provenzano	Democratic Party	2019–2021
Minister for Family and Equal Opportunities	Elena Bonetti	Democratic Party / Italia Viva	2019–2021
Minister of European Affairs	Vincenzo Amendola	Democratic Party	2019–2021
Minister for Sport and Youth Policies	Vincenzo Spadafora	Five Star Movement	2019–2021
Minister for Technological Innovation	Paola Pisano	Five Star Movement	2019–2021
Secretary of the Council of Ministers	Riccardo Fraccaro	Five Star Movement	2019–2021

== Composition ==
Office	Portrait	Name	Term of office	Party
Prime Minister		Giuseppe Conte	5 September 2019 – 13 February 2021	Independent
Prime Minister	Undersecretaries: Mario Turco (M5S) – Delegated to Economic Planning and Investment; Andrea Martella (PD) – Delegated to Publishing and Information; Pietro Benassi (Ind.) – Delegated to Authority for the Security of the Republic (since 22 January 2021)			
Minister of Foreign Affairs		Luigi Di Maio	5 September 2019 – 13 February 2021	Five Star Movement
Minister of Foreign Affairs	Deputy Ministers: Emanuela Del Re (M5S); Marina Sereni (PD); Undersecretaries: Manlio Di Stefano (M5S); Ivan Scalfarotto (IV) (until 14 January 2021) (Note: Scalfarotto resigned during a press conference in which Matteo Renzi, leader of Italia Viva, withdrew his support to the government.); Ricardo Merlo (MAIE)			
Minister of the Interior		Luciana Lamorgese	5 September 2019 – 13 February 2021	Independent
Minister of the Interior	Deputy Ministers: Vito Crimi (M5S); Matteo Mauri (PD); Undersecretaries: Carlo Sibilia (M5S); Achille Variati (PD)			
Minister of Justice		Alfonso Bonafede	5 September 2019 – 13 February 2021	Five Star Movement
Minister of Justice	Undersecretaries: Vittorio Ferraresi (M5S); Andrea Giorgis (PD)			
Minister of Defence		Lorenzo Guerini	5 September 2019 – 13 February 2021	Democratic Party
Minister of Defence	Undersecretaries: Angelo Tofalo (M5S); Giulio Calvisi (PD)			
Minister of Economy and Finance		Roberto Gualtieri	5 September 2019 – 13 February 2021	Democratic Party
Minister of Economy and Finance	Deputy Ministers: Laura Castelli (M5S); Antonio Misiani (PD); Undersecretaries: Alessio Villarosa (M5S); Pierpaolo Baretta (PD); Maria Cecilia Guerra (LeU/Art.1)			
Minister of Economic Development		Stefano Patuanelli	5 September 2019 – 13 February 2021	Five Star Movement
Minister of Economic Development	Deputy Minister: Stefano Buffagni (M5S); Undersecretaries: Alessandra Todde (M5S); Mirella Liuzzi (M5S); Gian Paolo Manzella (PD); Alessia Morani (PD)			
Minister of Agricultural, Food and Forestry Policies		Teresa Bellanova	5 September 2019 – 14 January 2021 (Note: Bellanova resigned during a press conference in which Matteo Renzi, leader of Italia Viva, withdrew his support to the government.)	Democratic Party; Before 18 September 2019
Minister of Agricultural, Food and Forestry Policies		Teresa Bellanova	5 September 2019 – 14 January 2021	Italia Viva; After 18 September 2019
Minister of Agricultural, Food and Forestry Policies		Giuseppe Conte (Acting)	14 January 2021 – 13 February 2021	Independent
Minister of Agricultural, Food and Forestry Policies	Undersecretaries: Giuseppe L'Abbate (M5S)			
Minister of the Environment		Sergio Costa	5 September 2019 – 13 February 2021	Independent
Minister of the Environment	Undersecretaries: Roberto Morassut (PD)			
Minister of Infrastructure and Transport		Paola De Micheli	5 September 2019 – 13 February 2021	Democratic Party
Minister of Infrastructure and Transport	Deputy Minister: Giancarlo Cancelleri (M5S); Undersecretaries: Roberto Traversi (M5S); Salvatore Margiotta (PD)			
Minister of Labour and Social Policies		Nunzia Catalfo	5 September 2019 – 13 February 2021	Five Star Movement
Minister of Labour and Social Policies	Undersecretaries: Stanislao Di Piazza (M5S); Francesca Puglisi (PD)			
Minister of Education, University and Research (Note: On 28 December 2019, after the resignation of former Minister of Education, University and Research, Lorenzo Fioramonti, the prime minister split the Ministry into a Ministry of Public Education and a Ministry of University and Research.)		Lorenzo Fioramonti	5 September 2019 – 30 December 2019 (Note: Fioramonti resigned after disagreements on the 2020 financial budget bill. According to Fioramonti, the approved bill allocated insufficient funds for education and research.)	Five Star Movement
Minister of Education, University and Research		Giuseppe Conte (Acting)	30 December 2019 – 10 January 2020	Independent
Minister of Education, University and Research	Deputy Minister: Anna Ascani (PD) (until 10 January 2020); Undersecretaries: Lucia Azzolina (M5S) (until 10 January 2020); Giuseppe De Cristofaro (LeU/SI) (until 10 January 2020)			
Minister of Public Education		Lucia Azzolina	10 January 2020 – 13 February 2021	Five Star Movement
Minister of Public Education	Deputy Minister: Anna Ascani (PD); Undersecretary: Giuseppe De Cristofaro (LeU/SI)			
Minister of University and Research		Gaetano Manfredi	10 January 2020 – 13 February 2021	Independent
Minister of Cultural Heritage and Activities and Tourism		Dario Franceschini	5 September 2019 – 13 February 2021	Democratic Party
Minister of Cultural Heritage and Activities and Tourism	Undersecretaries: Anna Laura Orrico (M5S); Lorenza Bonaccorsi (PD)			
Minister of Health		Roberto Speranza	5 September 2019 – 13 February 2021	Free and Equal (Art.1)
Minister of Health	Deputy Minister: Pierpaolo Sileri (M5S); Undersecretaries: Sandra Zampa (PD)			
Minister for Parliamentary Relations (without portfolio)		Federico D'Incà	5 September 2019 – 13 February 2021	Five Star Movement
Minister for Parliamentary Relations (without portfolio)	Undersecretaries: Gianluca Castaldi (M5S); Simona Malpezzi (PD)			
Minister of Public Administration (without portfolio)		Fabiana Dadone	5 September 2019 – 13 February 2021	Five Star Movement
Minister of Regional Affairs and Autonomies (without portfolio)		Francesco Boccia	5 September 2019 – 13 February 2021	Democratic Party
Minister for the South (without portfolio)		Giuseppe Provenzano	5 September 2019 – 13 February 2021	Democratic Party
Minister for Family and Equal Opportunities (without portfolio)		Elena Bonetti	5 September 2019 – 14 January 2021 (Note: Bonetti resigned during a press conference in which Matteo Renzi, leader of Italia Viva, withdrew his support to the government.)	Democratic Party; Before 18 September 2019
Minister for Family and Equal Opportunities (without portfolio)		Elena Bonetti	5 September 2019 – 14 January 2021	Italia Viva; After 18 September 2019
Minister for Family and Equal Opportunities (without portfolio)		Giuseppe Conte (Acting)	14 January 2021 – 13 February 2021	Independent
Minister of European Affairs (without portfolio)		Vincenzo Amendola	5 September 2019 – 13 February 2021	Democratic Party
Minister of European Affairs (without portfolio)	Undersecretaries: Laura Agea (M5S)			
Minister for Sport and Youth Policies (without portfolio)		Vincenzo Spadafora	5 September 2019 – 13 February 2021	Five Star Movement
Minister for Technological Innovation (without portfolio)		Paola Pisano	5 September 2019 – 13 February 2021	Five Star Movement
Secretary of the Council of Ministers		Riccardo Fraccaro	5 September 2019 – 13 February 2021	Five Star Movement
