= Centre for the Study of Governance Innovation =

South African research centre

The Centre for the Study of Governance Innovation (GovInn) is a research centre of the University of Pretoria in South Africa. It was launched at the International Studies Association annual conference on 6 April 2013 and then in South Africa on 20 May 2013 by the University of Pretoria, with a keynote lecture by political scientist and activist Susan George.

GovInn is the first research institution in Africa dedicated entirely to governance innovation. Its goal is to promote research that helps rethink conventional wisdom in the field of development and governance studies, with projects dedicated to the governance of the commons, beyond GDP economic governance, and new forms of bottom-up regionalism. It also specialises in resource governance, through international projects such as the Land Matrix, the global dataset on land grab and other forms of investment in land, agriculture and common resources

The centre is directed by political economist Lorenzo Fioramonti, and its international advisory board is made up of scholars and experts in international development, including Susan George, Simon Zadek, Luk Van Langenhove, Lydia Powell, Jan Aart Scholte and Lew Daly. GovInn hosts the Governance Innovation Week, an annual gathering of leaders and innovators from all over the world. Keynote speakers at the Week have included Susan George, Johan Galtung, Robert Costanza, Raj Patel, Michel Bauwens and Simon Zadek. GovInn has long-standing partnerships with research institutions such as CIRAD and the United Nations University, through its institute for comparative regionalism UNU-CRIS. GovInn also houses the first and only Jean Monnet Programme Chair in Africa and the UNESCO-UNU Chair in Regional Integration Migration and Free Movement of People.
