= Giuseppe L'Abbate =

Italian politician

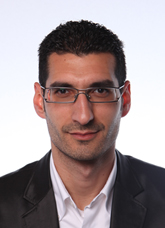

Undersecretary of State to the Ministry of Agriculture and Forests
- In office 16 September 2019 – 13 February 2021
- Prime Minister: Giuseppe Conte; Mario Draghi

Member of the Chamber of Deputies
- In office 15 March 2013 – 12 October 2022
- Constituency: Puglia

Personal details
- Born: 13 March 1985 (age 41) Castellana Grotte, Italy
- Party: M5S (2013–2022)
- Education: University of Bari
- Profession: Politician

Giuseppe L'Abbate (born 13 March 1985) is an Italian politician.

== Political career ==
He was elected to the Chamber of Deputies in 2013 and re-elected in 2018 for the Five Star Movement.

He was State Secretary at the Ministry of Agricultural, Food and Forestry Policies in the Conte II Cabinet.

In 2022 he left the Five Star Movement with Luigi Di Maio. He is the political manifesto coordinator for Together for the Future for the 2022 Italian general election.
