= Pierpaolo Sileri =

Italian politician, surgeon and academic professor

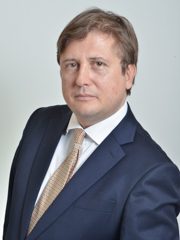

Member of the Senate of the Republic
- In office 23 March 2018 – 12 October 2022
- Constituency: Lazio 4

Personal details
- Born: 25 August 1972 (age 54) Rome, Italy
- Party: Together for the Future
- Height: 1.78 m (5 ft 10 in)
- Education: University of Rome Tor Vergata

Pierpaolo Sileri (Italian pronunciation: [pjerˈpaːolo siˈlɛːri]; born 25 August 1972) is an Italian politician, surgeon and academic professor and since served from 13 September 2019 until 13 February 2021 as Deputy Minister of Health in the government of the Italian Republic.

He received the Knight of the Order of Labour on 27 December 2013.

== Biography ==
He graduated with honors in Medicine and Surgery in 1998 at the Tor Vergata University of Rome where he obtained his specialization in Surgery of the digestive system in 2004 and the PhD in Robotics and computer science applied to surgery (2005).

Fellow from 1999 to 2002 at University of Illinois of Chicago where he obtained the Master in Surgical Sciences, and where from 2017 he obtained the title of Adjunct Clinical Assistant Professor of Surgery.

From 2019, he is associate professor at University Vita-Salute San Raffaele of Milan.

He has contributed to more than 167 scientific publications.

He tested positive for infection with the coronavirus on 14 March 2020.

== Political activity ==
In the political elections of March 2018, he was elected to the Senate of the Republic in the uninominal college of Rome-Collatino, supported by the 5 Star Movement, defeating closely the candidate of the center-right Lavinia Mennuni.

On 21 June 2018 he was elected President of the 12th Senate Permanent Hygiene and Health Commission of the Senat of the Italian Republic

On 31 October 2018, he was appointed member of the Senate Parliamentary Committee for Children and Adolescents of the Senat of the Italian Republic

During the XVIII legislature, he presented as a first signatory a set of law proposal inherent: the teaching of health education in schools, the donation of the body for research purposes, the treatment of endometriosis and the modification of article 117 of the Constitution. He also promoted the institution of the national day of human health and that for adherence to therapy, finally he dealt with measures on autism and the protection of stomata and incontinent patients.

On 2 February 2020, in the midst of the COVID-19 pandemic, he left for Wuhan as coordinator of a team of doctors and nurses in the mission that will allow the recovery of 56 Italian countrymen present in the Chinese city. However, due to health problems, it was not possible to allow the repatriation of an Italian citizen, Niccolò, who will return to Italy on 15 February 2020 with an Air Force flight in which Sileri has taken part again.

On 3 February 2020, the Chamber of Deputies definitively approves the law proposal number AS733 in its first signature concerning "Rules on the disposition of one's body and post-mortem tissues for study, training and scientific research purposes." defined by the press "Sileri Law".

On 13 February 2021, with the oath of the Mario Draghi's government, he ceases to function as Deputy Minister of Health.

== Electoral history ==
2018 general election (S): Rome
Candidate	Party	Votes	%	
Pierpaolo Sileri	Five Star Movement	94,144	32.98	Elected
Lavinia Mennuni	Centre-right coalition	93,598	32.79	
Paolo Quinto	Centre-left coalition	71,105	24.9	
Others		26,616	9.33	
Total		285,463	100.0	

== Other information ==
=== The experience in the commissioner management of Rome ===
During the commissarial management of the Municipality of Rome, in 2016, he is part of the "technical secretariat" of Commissioner Francesco Paolo Tronca together with representatives of the Army, Guardia di Finanza, Carabinieri, State Police, university teachers and magistrates.

=== The appeal to the regional administrative court against appointments in University ===
In 2015 he presented an appeal to the regional administrative court to block a direct call appointment procedure. In March 2017 the TAR recognized the defects in the procedure and the Council of State in 2018 confirmed the cancellation of the procedure.

These events are also the subject of an investigation by the Prosecutor of Rome which led to the trial and trial of the Rector.

Following these events, along with other researchers and members of the Italian academic world, he founded the association "Transparency and Merit. The University we want".

== Personal life ==
Since 2018, Sileri has been married with Giada Nurry, with whom he has one child, Ludovico.
