= Civic Commitment =

Civic Commitment Impegno Civico
- Leader: Luigi Di Maio
- Founded: 1 August 2022
- Dissolved: 21 October 2022
- Headquarters: Via Francesco Denza 15, Rome
- Ideology: Reformism; Green politics Pro-Europeanism
- Political position: Centre
- National affiliation: Centre-left coalition
- Member parties: IpF; CD; A2050; PSDI
- Colors: Teal Orange

Website
- impegno-civico.it

Civic Commitment (Italian: Impegno Civico, IC) was an Italian centrist electoral list running in the 2022 general election, composed of Luigi Di Maio's Together for the Future (IpF) and Bruno Tabacci's Democratic Centre (CD).

According to its founders Di Maio and Tabacci, IC's platform was based on pro-Europeanism, reformism and green politics.

== History ==
In June 2022, the minister of foreign affairs Luigi Di Maio, along with several deputies and senators, left the Five Star Movement (M5S) and launched Together for the Future (IpF), a parliamentary group active both in the Senate and the Chamber, which was joined also by two MEPs. Following the resignation of prime minister Mario Draghi and the call for a snap election to be held in September, Di Maio started talks with Bruno Tabacci, a Christian leftist politician and leader of Democratic Centre (CD), around the possibility of forming a joint list for the upcoming election.

On 1 August, Di Maio and Tabacci, along with Lucia Azzolina, Emilio Carelli, Laura Castelli and other former members of the M5S, presented their joint list named "Civic Commitment", along with the new party's logo. The Italian Republican Party (PRI) initially joined the list but it withdrew on 8 August to join forces with Italia Viva (IV). Civic Commitment became a part of the centre-left coalition in the 2022 general election. During the event, Di Maio strongly criticized Giuseppe Conte, Matteo Salvini and Silvio Berlusconi, labeling them as "extremist", adding that "their victory would isolate Italy from Europe". On 11 August, Alessio Pascucci, leading member of Italia in Comune and leader of the National Civic Agenda/Network joined IC, but later Pascucci left IC blaming the leadership for ignoring them.

After the disappointing electoral result, on October 7 Tabacci declared the electoral experience of Civic Commitment concluded. Di Maio's party, IpF, ceased to exist on October 13 with the beginning of the new legislature. On 22 October Di Maio resigned from the office of leader of Civic Commitment, signaling the de facto dissolution of the party.

== Composition ==
Party	Ideology	Leader
Together for the Future (IpF)	Centrism	Luigi Di Maio
Democratic Centre (CD)	Christian left	Bruno Tabacci
Environment 2050 (A2050)	Green politics	Federico D'Incà
Innovative Democratic Socialist Proposal (PSDI)	Social democracy	Mario Calì

== Electoral results ==
Election	Leader	Chamber of Deputies				Senate of the Republic			
Election	Leader	Votes	%	Seats	Position	Votes	%	Seats	Position
2022	Luigi Di Maio	185,163	0.60	1 / 400	15th	176,383	0.56	0 / 200	15th
