= Sergio Costa =

Italian military official and politician

Honorable Sergio Costa
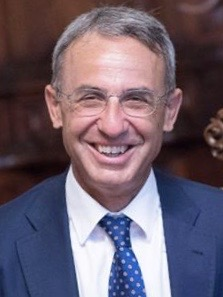

Vice-President of the Chamber of Deputies
- Incumbent
- Assumed office 19 October 2022
- President: Lorenzo Fontana

Minister of the Environment
- In office 1 June 2018 – 13 February 2021
- Prime Minister: Giuseppe Conte
- Preceded by: Gian Luca Galletti
- Succeeded by: Roberto Cingolani (Ecological Transition)

Member of the Chamber of Deputies
- Incumbent
- Assumed office 13 October 2022
- Constituency: Naples-Fuorigrotta

Personal details
- Born: 22 April 1959 (age 67) Naples, Italy
- Party: Five Star Movement (since 2022)
- Education: University of Naples Federico II
- Profession: Forest Carabinieri official

Sergio Costa (born 22 April 1959) is an Italian military official and politician, who served in the government of Italy as Minister of the Environment between 2018 and 2021. He is a member of the Five Star Movement.

== Biography ==
Costa was born in Naples on 22 April 1959. In 1983 he graduated in Agricultural science at the University of Naples Federico II.

Between 2006 and 2008 he was in the staff of the Minister for the Environment Alfonso Pecoraro Scanio during the Prodi II Cabinet.

=== Military career ===
He was Commander of the Provincial Police of Naples, with the title of Manager, until 7 April 2009. In 2009 he passed to the State Forestry Corps; from 2009 to 2010 he was regional commander of the Basilicata, and vice commander from 2010 to 2011. Subsequently, he was Provincial Commander of Naples from 2011 to 2014 and Regional Commander of Campania from 2014 to 2016. Inserted in the ranks of the Carabinieri, after the incorporation of the Forestry Corps, from 1 January 2017 to 31 May 2018 he was Regional Commandant of forest carabinieri of Campania, with the rank of Brigadier general.

=== Minister of the Environment ===
On 25 February 2018, Luigi Di Maio (leader of the Five Star Movement) indicated Sergio Costa as Minister of the Environment of his possible future government team. Finally, on 1 June 2018, Costa was officially appointed Minister of the Environment of the Conte I Cabinet. He was later re-confirmed in the Conte II Cabinet.
