= Daniela Rondinelli =

Italian politician

Daniela Rondinelli MEP
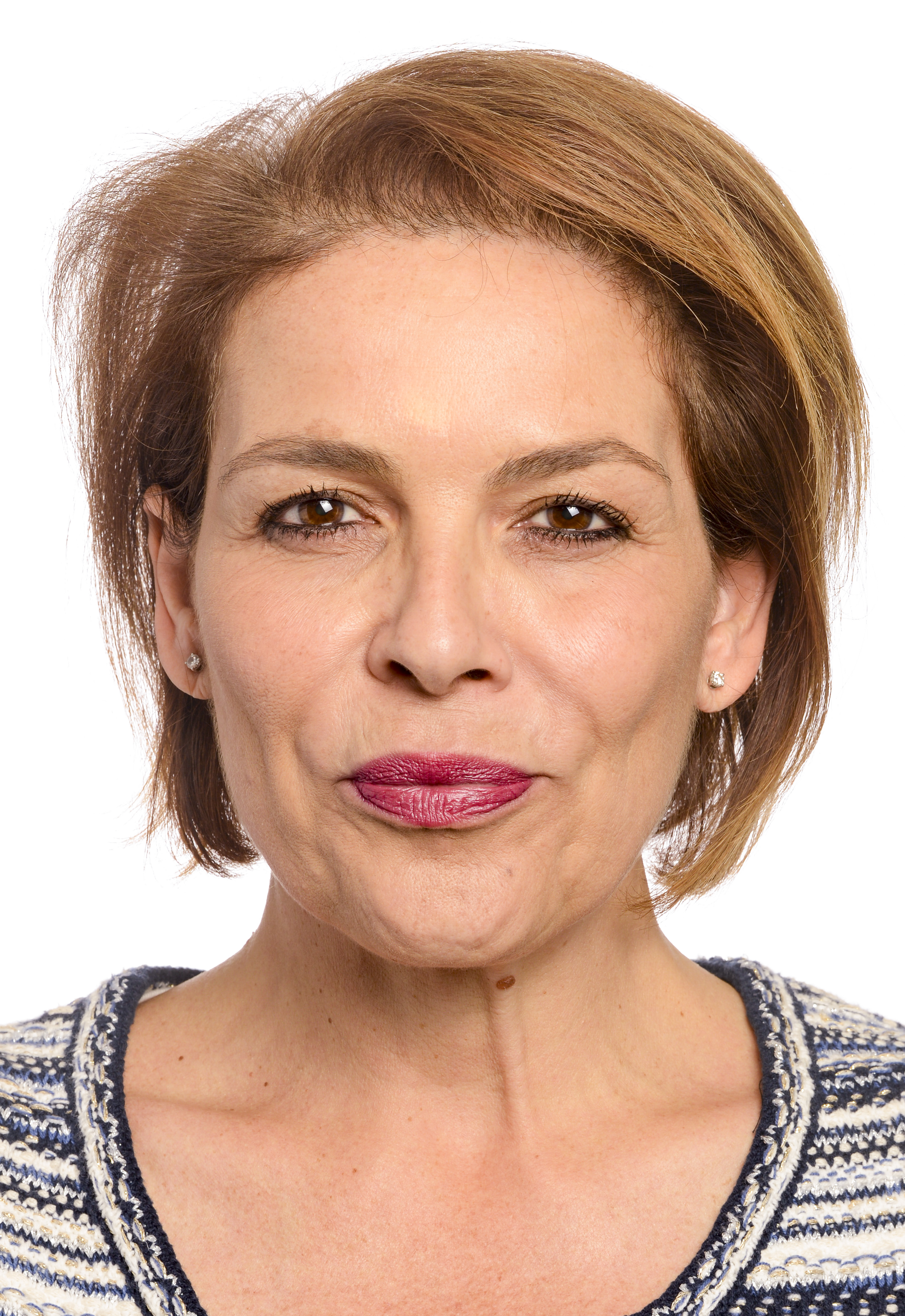

Member of the European Parliament for Central Italy
- In office 2 July 2019 – 16 July 2024

Personal details
- Party: Democratic (since 2023)
- Other political affiliations: Five Star Movement (until 2022); Together for the Future (2022)

Daniela Rondinelli (born 19 August 1967) is an Italian politician and member of the European Parliament in 2019.
