= Nunzia Catalfo =

Italian politician (born 1967)

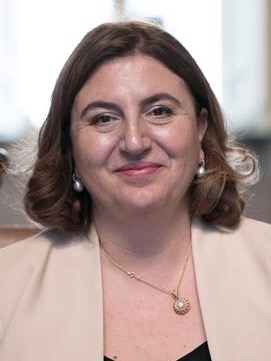

Minister of Labour and Social Policies
- In office 5 September 2019 – 13 February 2021
- Prime Minister: Giuseppe Conte
- Preceded by: Luigi Di Maio
- Succeeded by: Andrea Orlando

Member of the Senate of the Republic
- In office 15 March 2013 – 13 October 2022
- Constituency: Sicily

Personal details
- Born: 29 July 1967 (age 58) Catania, Italy
- Party: Five Star Movement
- Profession: Politician

Nunzia Catalfo (born 29 July 1967) is an Italian politician, member of the Five Star Movement. She served as Minister of Labour and Social Policies in the Conte II Cabinet.

== Early life and education ==
Catalfo was born in Catania on 29 July 1967. She has a high school degree in science.

== Career ==
In 2013 she became a senator for the Five Star Movement. She was re-elected to the Senate in 2018. On 5 September 2019 she was appointed the Minister of Labour and Social Policies in the second Conte cabinet.

== Personal life ==
Catalfo is married and has two children.
