= Patrizio Bianchi =

Italian economist

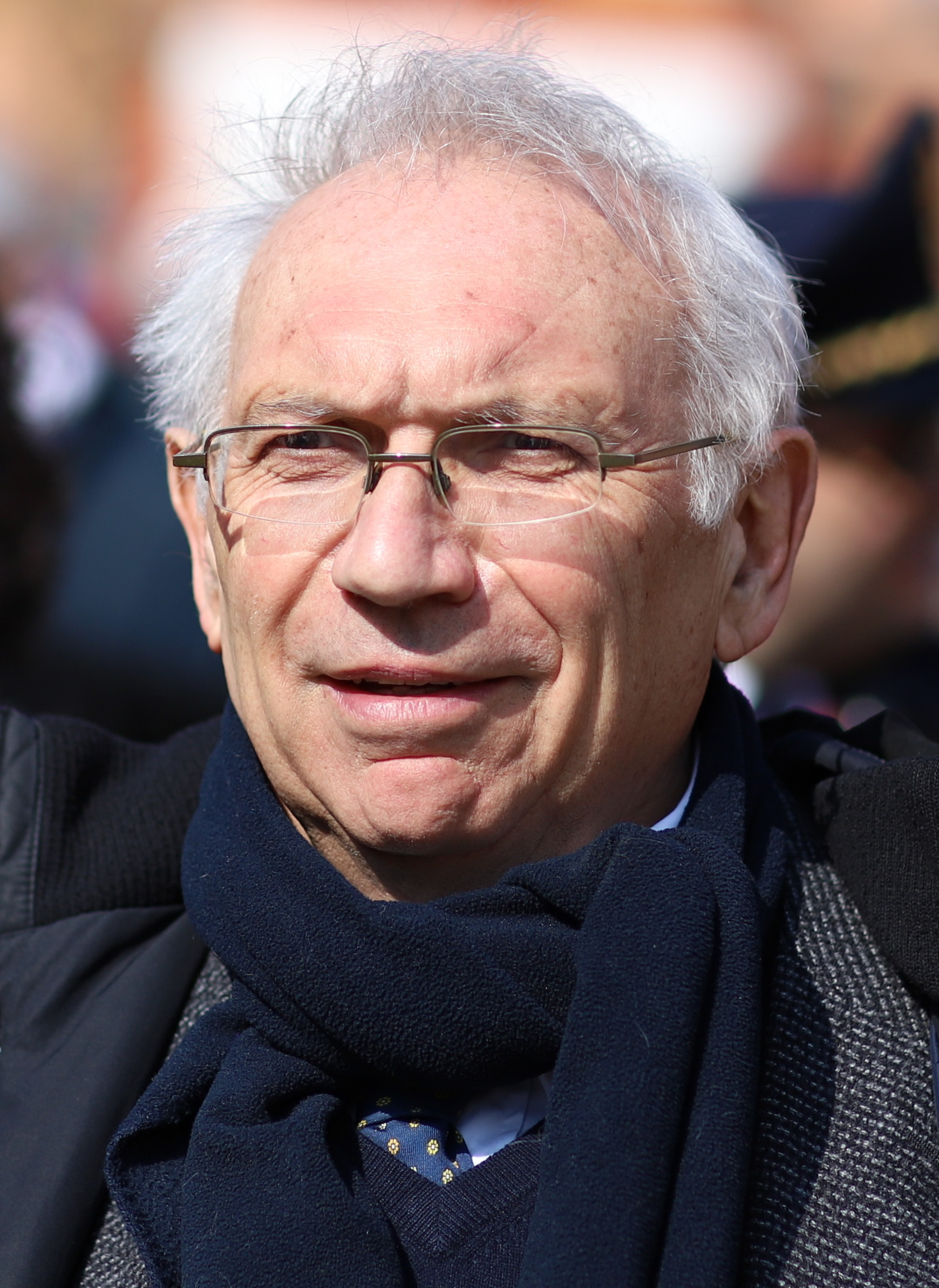

Minister of Education
- In office 13 February 2021 – 22 October 2022
- Prime Minister: Mario Draghi
- Preceded by: Lucia Azzolina
- Succeeded by: Giuseppe Valditara

Personal details
- Born: 28 May 1952 (age 74) Copparo, Italy
- Education: University of Bologna
- Occupation: Economist, professor

Patrizio Bianchi (born 28 May 1952) is an Italian economist and academic, current chairholder of the UNESCO Chair in Education, Growth and Equality. He served as minister of education in the Draghi Cabinet from 2021 to 2022.

== Biography ==
=== Early life and studies ===
Patrizio Bianchi was born in the town of Copparo, but he and his family moved to the nearby city of Ferrara in his early life. After having graduated from the University of Bologna in May 1976 with honours in political science under the guidance of Romano Prodi and Alberto Quadrio Curzio, he specialised in economics and industrial politics at the London School of Economics with Professor Basil Yamey. During this period, he worked for the British Price Commission, participating in an investigative report into price controls in the cement sector, a subject about which he wrote his first essay, published in 1980 by Il Mulino.

=== Academic Activity ===
==== Early career at the universities of Trento, Udine and Bologna ====
In 1980, he became a researcher at the Faculty of Economics of the University of Trento, and in the same year, the Minister of Budget Beniamino Andreatta nominated him National Planning Secretary for the restructuring of the automobile industry. In 1981, he became the supervising scientist for the Laboratory of Industrial Politics in Nomisma.

In 1982, he moved to the University of Bologna in the same role of university researcher, where he won the Associate Professorship in 1986. In 1987 along with Martin Carnoy (Stanford University) and Manuel Castells (University of California, Berkeley), he was invited to the Chinese Ministry of Education to analyse the relationship between the university system and economic development, paying particular attention to the evaluation of research activities and to the training of PhD students. In 1989, he was named as visiting professor of Political Economics at the University of Udine. In 1991, he returned to Bologna as visiting professor of Political Economics for the European community, with the mandate to launch the course of political science from the new seat of the University of Bologna at Forli. Furthermore, at the University of Bologna in 1994, he became a full professor of Economic Policy in the Department of Economic Sciences.

In 1992, he was named as director of the economic and industrial politics magazine L'industria (published by Il Mulino), a role that he would carry out until 2004.

==== University of Ferrara: from the foundation of the Faculty of Economics to becoming Dean ====
In 1997, he entered into the governing body of the IRI - Istituto per la Ricostruzione Industriale with the objective of finalising its privatisation by the year 2000. From 1999 to 2000 he was named President of Sviluppo Italia (today Invitalia) the national agency for the development of Southern Italy - created with the objective of valuing, rationalising and reuniting the previously operating 8 agencies of development.

In 1997 he moved to the University of Ferrara where in 1998 he founded the Faculty of Economics - now knows as Department of Economy and Management, recognised as department of excellence at national level. Here he fulfilled his role as Full Professor of Economy and Industrial Politics as well as becoming the faculty director in 2000. Professor Bianchi was elected Dean of the university with a 3-year term in 2004 and reelected to the same post until 2010. From 2004 to 2007, he was part of the managerial committee of the Conference of Italian University Rectors. From 2006 to 2010, he was appointed as President of the Foundation of the Conference of Italian University Rectors and President of the Università telematica internazionale "UniNettuno" of Rome (owned by the consortium of Italian universities "Nettuno"). From 2003 to 2010, he acted as President of IMPAT - university consortium for the promotion of technology transfer and research spin-offs.

Since January 2020, he has been the UNESCO chairholder for Education, Growth and Equality at the University Of Ferrara.

Over the years, he has carried out research and consultancy activities for major national, European and international institutions, in particular in the area of industrial policy and development policies, publishing over 200 articles and 40 books in Italian, English and Spanish.

=== Political Activity ===
==== Regional Minister for Emilia-Romagna ====
He served as Regional Minister for education, training, research, university, labour, work and European policies for development for the Emilia-Romagna region for two terms from 2010 to February 2020 under the respective guidance of the presidents Vasco Errani and Stefano Bonaccini.

From 2010 to 2012, he designed and implemented the reform of regional professional development, and from 2012 to 2014, he managed the reinitiation of teaching activities and the reconstruction of schools in the area affected by the 2012 20–29 May Earthquake. Since 2017 he has directed the activities for the design and activation of the Big Data Technopole in Bologna, the new headquarters of the European Center for Weather Forecasts (previously located in Reading but transferred to Bologna following Brexit) and of the European Scientific Supercomputing Center which houses Leonardo, the fourth fastest supercomputer in the world. In January 2019, he founded the International Foundation Big Data and Artificial Intelligence for Human Development (IFAB), where he was Scientific Director until 2021. Since June 2018 he has also worked as vice-president of the Intermediterranean Commission (CIM) of the Conference of Peripheral and Maritime Regions (CPMR).

His term as Regional Minister ended in February 2020. During his years as Councillor he was awarded the honour of Commendatore al merito della Repubblica Italiana by the President of the Italian Republic Giorgio Napolitano in 2010. On the 11 June 2015 as part of the closing meeting of the academic year of the Accademia dei Lincei he received the Lincei prize of the Ministry of Cultural Heritage for Political and Social Sciences from the President of the Italian Republic, Sergio Mattarella.

==== Italian Minister of Education in the Mario Draghi cabinet ====
In April of the same year, he coordinated the ministerial task force, formed by the then Minister of Education Lucia Azzolina, to coordinate and manage the restart of the school year during the COVID-19 pandemic.

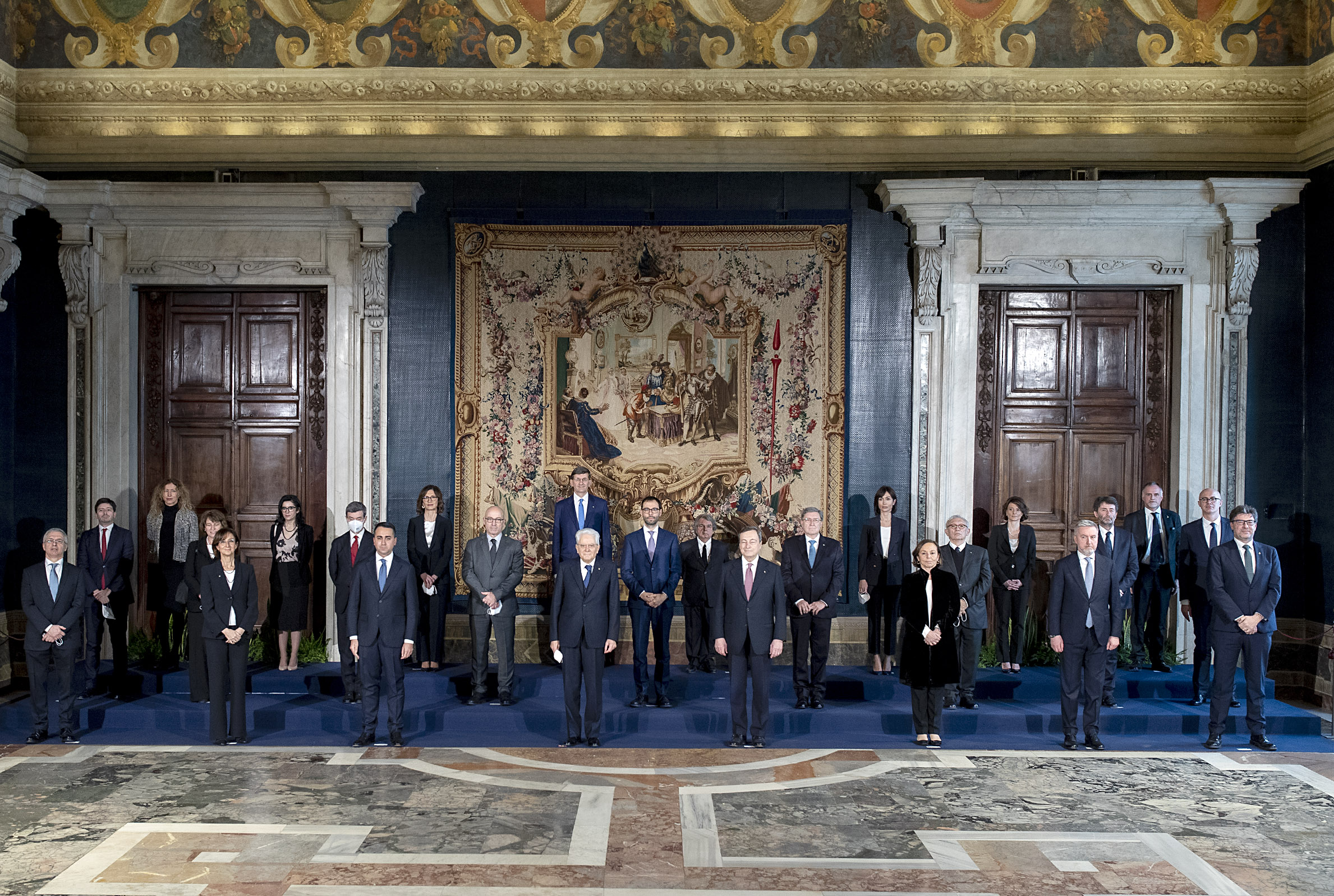
The Draghi government at the Quirinal Palace for the official portrait. Patrizio Bianchi is 7th from right.

On 12 February 2021 he was named by Mario Draghi as Minister of Education in the Draghi government (a national unity government) and was sworn in the following day at the Quirinale in the presence of the President of the Republic Sergio Mattarella. The main objectives of his term was the return of face-to-face teaching for the 2021–2022 school year after the distance learning period due to the coronavirus pandemic and the implementation of the reforms envisaged by the National Recovery and Resilience Plan - PNRR (part of Next Generation EU).

Patrizio Bianchi at the conference, 2021

As Education Secretary, he chaired the G20 of education in Catania in 2021, held within the 2021 G20 summit under the Italian presidency. In September 2022, he also spoke in New York on the theme "Transforming Education for a Transforming World" at the seventy-seventh UN general assembly.

His term ended on 22 October 2022, with the inauguration of the Meloni government.

=== Return to Academic Activity ===
After his term in government concluded, he returned to academic activity, being appointed professor emeritus at the University of Ferrara. On 3 and 4 November 2022, he participated in the International Conference of UNESCO Chairs held in Paris on the occasion of the thirtieth anniversary of the UNESCO/UNITWIN Chairs Program.

== Honours, Prizes and recognitions ==
- 2005 - Honorary Professor of Economy and Technology at the Technological University of Guangzhou
- 2008 - Honorary Citizen of the City of Fokoué-Fotomena, Cameroon
- 2009 - Honorary Citizen of the City of Rafaela
- 2010 - Commander/Commendatore Ordine al Merito della Repubblica Italiana/3rd Class Order of Merit of the Italian Republic
- 2015 - Lincei Prize winner, Ministry of culture and Accademia Nazionale dei Lincei
- 2020 - Honorary Citizen of the City of Novafeltria
- 2020 - Member of the Vicenza Olympic Academy
- 2020 - UNESCO chairholder for "Education, Growth, Equality"
- 2022 - Doctorado ad honorem, Universidad de Buenos Aires.
- 2022 - Honorary degree in Economy and Political Science, University of Medicine, Tirana.

== Works ==
- Politiche pubbliche e strategie dell'impresa nell'industria europea del cemento, Il Mulino, Bologna, pp. 1–162, 1980
- Il controllo dei prezzi. Un confronto internazionale, Franco Angeli, Milano, pp. 1–140, 1982
- Public and Private Control in Mass Product Industry: The Cement Industry Cases, Martinus Nijhoff Publisher, London, pp. 1–140, 1983
- Divisione del lavoro e ristrutturazione industriale, Il Mulino, Bologna, pp. 1–130, 1984
- Antitrust e gruppi industriali, Il Mulino, Bologna, pp. 1–300, 1988
- Industrial Reorganization and StructuralChange in the Automobile Industry, Collana di Economia Applicata, Bologna University Press, Bologna, pp. 1–142, 1989
- L'amministrazione dell'industria e del commercio estero, (P. Bianchi and M. G. Giordani eds.), Il Mulino, Bologna, pp. 1–270, 1990
- Produzione e potere di mercato, Ediesse, Roma, pp. 1–270, 1991
- Concorrenza e controllo delle concentrazioni in Europa, (P. Bianchi and G. Gualtieri eds.), Il Mulino, Bologna, pp. 1–502, 1993
- Technology and Human Resources in Europe after Maastricht, (P. Bianchi e M. Carnoyeds), International Journal of Technology Management, vol. 9, n. ¾, 1994
- Europe's Economic Challenge, (P. Bianchi, K. Cowling, R. Sudgeneds), Routledge, London-New York, pp. 1–216, 1994
- L'Europa smarrita, Vallecchi Editore, Firenze, pp. 1–180, 1995
- Le politiche industriali dell'Unione Europea, Il Mulino, Bologna, pp. 1–250, 1995
- Cambiamento delle istituzioni economiche e nuovo sviluppo in Italia e in Europa, (S. Beretta e P. Bianchi eds.), Il Mulino, Bologna, pp. 1–410, 1996
- Costruir el mercado. Lecciones de la Unión Europea: el desarrollo de la instituciones y de las políticas de competitividad, Universidad Nacional de Quilmes, Buenos Aires, pp. 1–260, 1997
- Industrial Policies and Economic Integration. Learning from European Experiences, Routledge, London, pp. 1–240, 1998
- Construir el Mercado, nueva edicion, Pagina/12 editorial, Buenos Aires, 1998
- InnovacionY Territorio, Politicas para pequeña empresas, (con L. M. Miller), Editorial JVS, Mexico City, pp. 1–280, 1999
- Politiche industriali dell'Unione Europea, 2ª edizione ampliata, Il Mulino, Bologna, pp. 1–326, 1999
- Le Api Audaci – Piccole Imprese e Dinamiche Industriali in Estremo Oriente, (con M. R. De Tommaso and L. Rubini), Franco Angeli, Milano, pp. 1–210, 2000
- La Rincorsa Frenata – L'industria italiana dall'unità nazionale all'unificazione europea, Il Mulino, Saggi, Bologna, pp. 1–330, 2002
- Technology, Information and Market Dynamics: Topics in Advanced Industrial Organization, (P. Bianchi and L. Lambertini eds.), E. Elgar, London, pp. 1–212, 2003
- The Economic Importance of Intangible Assets, (P. Bianchi and S. Labory eds.), Ashgate Academic Pu. London, pp. 1–202, 2004
- International Handbook on Industrial Policy, (P. Bianchi and S. Labory eds.), E. Elgar, Cheltenham, pp. 1–464, 2006
- High Technology, Productivity and Networks, (P. Bianchi, M. D. Parrilli, R. Sugden eds.), Palgrave Pu., London, pp. 1–254, 2008
- International Handbook on Industrial Policy, (P. Bianchi and S. Labory eds.), II edition, 2008
- Le nuove politiche industriali dell'Unione Europea, (con S. Labory), Il Mulino, pp. 1–243, Bologna, 2009
- Le politiche industriali alla prova del futuro, (P. Bianchi and C. Pozzi eds.), Bologna, Il Mulino, 2010.
- Industrial Policies after the Crisis. Seizing the Future, (con S. Labory), E. Elgar, Cheltenham, pp. 1–150, 2011
- La zucca i coriandoli e la strega cicciona, Ferrara, Corbo Editore, 2011
- La rincorsa frenata. L'industria italiana dall'unità nazionale alla crisi globale. Nuova edizione, Il Mulino, Bologna, pp. 1–346, 2013
- Globalizzazione, crisi e ristrutturazione industriale, McGraw-Hill Education, Milano, pp. 1–190, Milano-New York, 2014
- Manufacturing Reinassance, (con S. Labory), Revue d'économie industrielle, numéro special (two issues), n. 144, pp. 1–200, 2013 and n. 145, pp. 1–200, 2014
- Toward a New Industrial Policy. Selected Papers, (con S. Labory), Mc Graw Hill Education, Milano, pp. 1–190, Milano-New York, 2016
- Il Cammino e le orme. Industria e politica alle origini dell'Italia contemporanea, Il Mulino, Bologna, 2017
- Industrial policy for the manufacturing revolution: perspectives on digital globalisation, (P. Bianchi and S. Labory eds.), E. Elgar, Cheltenham, 2018
- 4.0 La nuova rivoluzione industriale, Il Mulino, Bologna 2018
- Nello specchio della scuola. Quale sviluppo per l'Italia, Il Mulino, Bologna, 2020
