= Stefano Patuanelli =

Italian politician and civil engineer (born 1974)

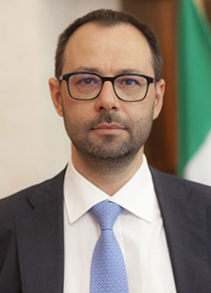
- Official portrait, 2021

Minister of Agricultural, Food and Forestry Policies
- In office 13 February 2021 – 22 October 2022
- Prime Minister: Mario Draghi
- Preceded by: Teresa Bellanova
- Succeeded by: Francesco Lollobrigida

Minister of Economic Development
- In office 5 September 2019 – 13 February 2021
- Prime Minister: Giuseppe Conte
- Preceded by: Luigi Di Maio
- Succeeded by: Giancarlo Giorgetti

Member of the Senate of the Republic
- Incumbent
- Assumed office 23 March 2018
- Constituency: Friuli-Venezia Giulia

Personal details
- Born: 8 June 1974 (age 52) Trieste, Italy
- Party: Five Star Movement
- Education: University of Trieste
- Profession: Politician, engineer

Stefano Patuanelli (born 8 June 1974) is an Italian politician and civil engineer, member of the Five Star Movement. On 5 September 2019, he was appointed the Italian Minister of Economic Development in the Conte II Cabinet.
