= Chiara Maria Gemma =

Italian politician (born 1968)

Chiara Maria Gemma MEP
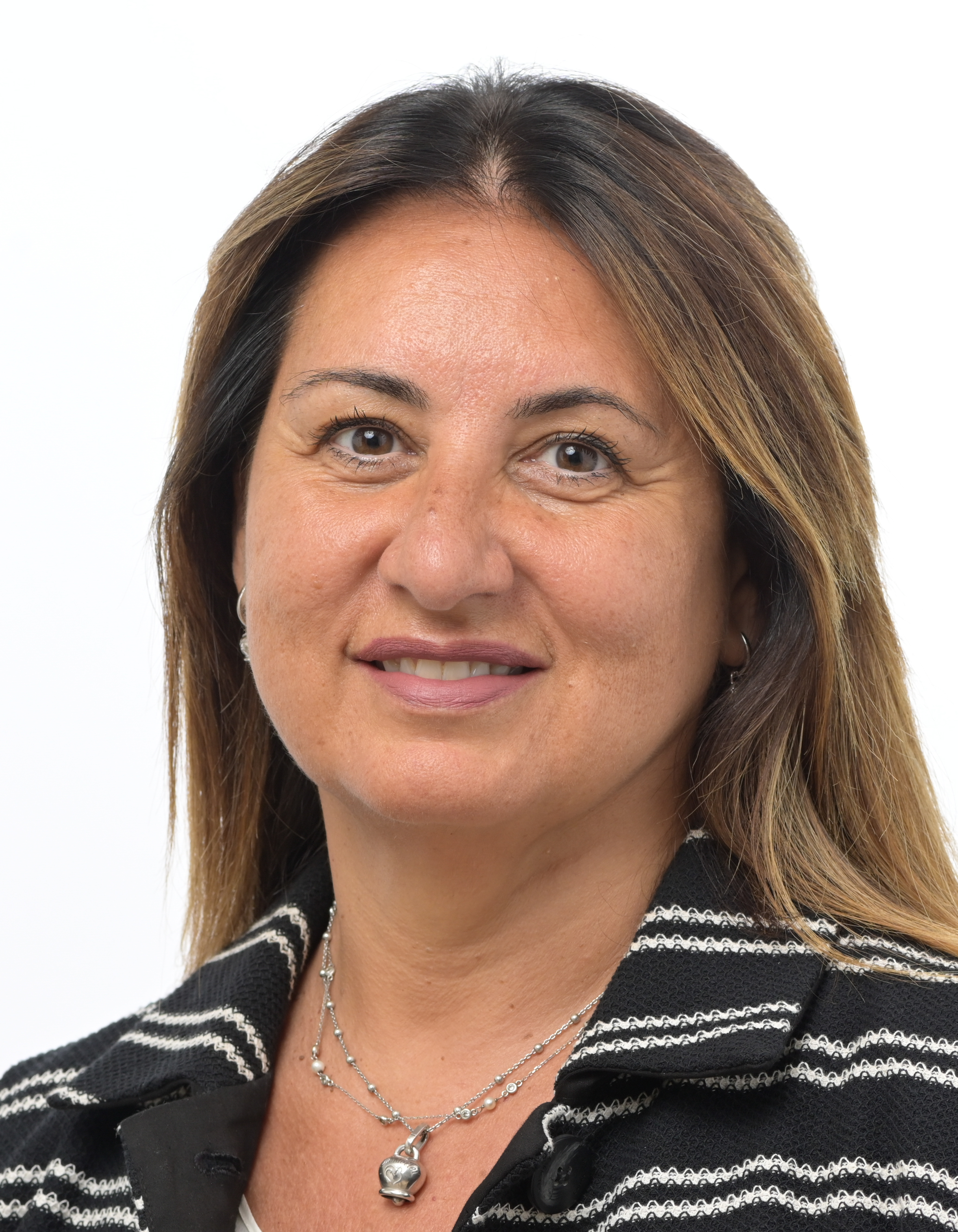
- Official portrait, 2024

Member of the European Parliament for Southern Italy
- Incumbent
- Assumed office 2 July 2019

Personal details
- Born: Chiara Maria Gemma; 20 September 1968 (age 58) Brindisi, Italy
- Party: FdI (2023–present)
- Other political affiliations: M5S (2019–2022); IpF (2022)
- Education: University of Bari
- Occupation: University professor Politician

Chiara Maria Gemma (born 20 September 1968) is an Italian politician who was elected as a member of the European Parliament in 2019 and in 2024.

== Biography ==
After earning a bachelor’s degree in Pedagogy with a grade of 110 cum laude from the University of Salento in 1995, he won a competitive position as a research fellow in “General Education” at the University of Bari Aldo Moro in 2001. In 2005, he earned his Ph.D. in “Design and Evaluation of Educational Processes” from the University of Bari. In 2006, her son Francesco was born. She passed the competitive exam for associate professor in General Didactics (M-PED/03) held by the “Suor Orsola Benincasa” University of Naples in 2006. Since 2007, she has been an associate professor in “Special Education and Pedagogy” at the University of Bari. In 2017, she obtained her qualification as a full professor; in 2020, she was appointed full professor of “Special Education and Pedagogy” by the University of Bari and is awaiting the start of her tenure upon the conclusion of her leave of absence for parliamentary duties. A member of various scientific and pedagogical societies, she co-edits the journal “Quaderni di didattica della scrittura” (Cafagna Editore). She lives in Province of Bari.
