= Lucia Azzolina =

Italian politician and teacher

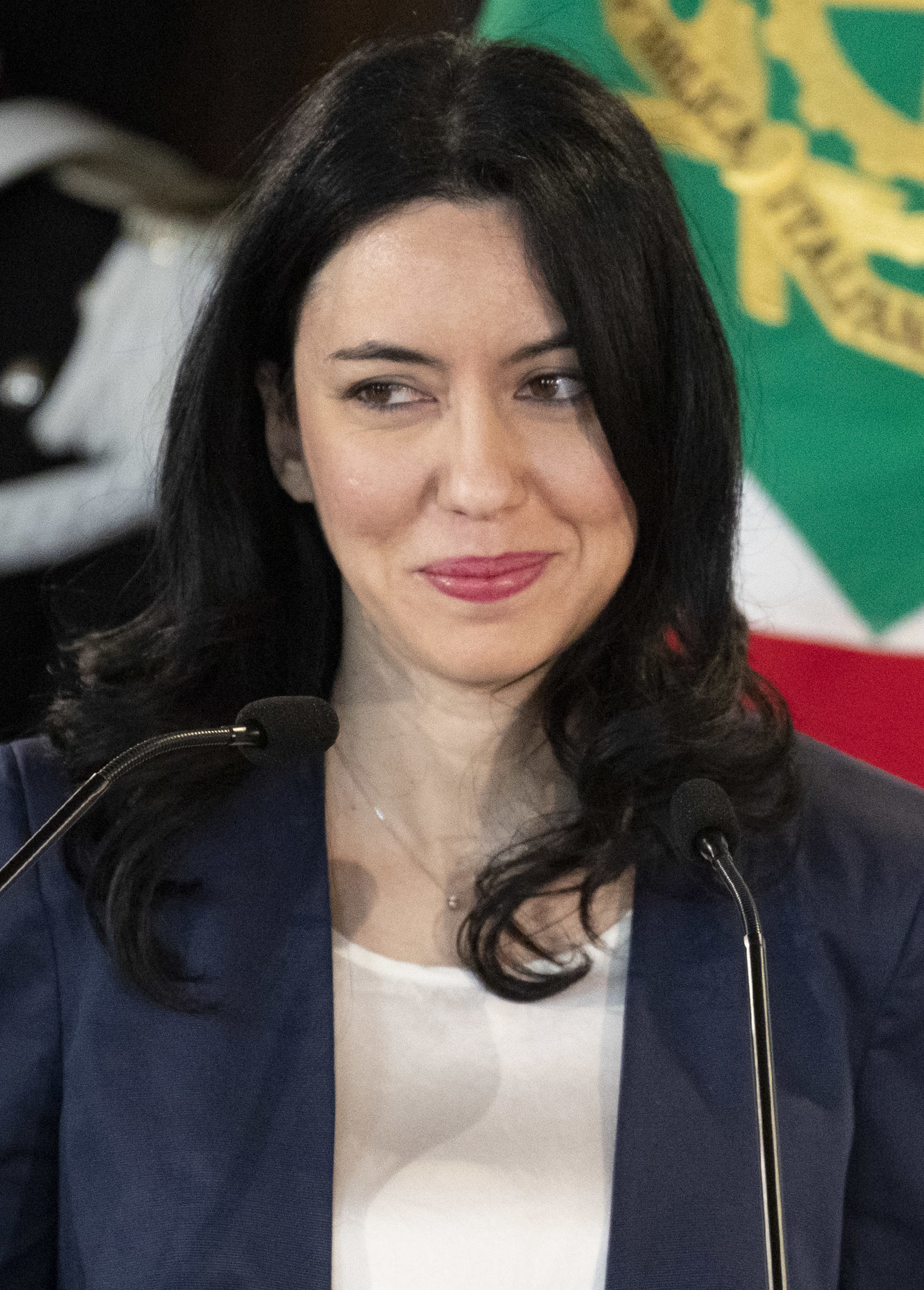

Minister of Education
- In office 10 January 2020 – 13 February 2021
- Prime Minister: Giuseppe Conte
- Preceded by: Lorenzo Fioramonti
- Succeeded by: Patrizio Bianchi

Member of the Chamber of Deputies
- In office 23 March 2018 – 12 October 2022
- Constituency: Piedmont

Personal details
- Born: 25 August 1982 (age 44) Siracusa, Italy
- Party: Five Star Movement
- Education: University of Catania; University of Pavia; University of Pisa
- Occupation: Politician, teacher, syndicalist

Lucia Azzolina (born 25 August 1982) is an Italian politician and teacher. She was the Minister of Education during the Conte II Cabinet.

== Biography ==
Lucia Azzolina attended the "Leonardo da Vinci" high school in Floridia, then she graduated in History of Philosophy at the University of Catania. She then attended the School of Specialization in secondary education (SSIS), for the qualification to teach history and philosophy.

After passing the final SSIS exam, she started teaching in the high schools of La Spezia and Sarzana. She obtained a specialization in teaching support at the University of Pisa. She then enrolled in the Faculty of Law of the University of Pavia, where she graduated in December 2013 with a thesis on administrative law, teaching simultaneously in the schools. In January 2014, she became a tenured teacher at the I.I.S "Quintino Sella" in Biella. After graduating in Law, she carried out forensic practice dealing with school law.

For several years she was active within the ANIEF (National Association of Teachers and Trainers), first in Piedmont, and then operating in Lombardy. After resigning from the union, she returned to teach in 2017 at the I.I.S "Quintino Sella" in Biella, joining the staff of the school management.

In the general election of 2018, she was a candidate to the Chamber of Deputies in the "Piedmont 2" constituency among the ranks of the Five Star Movement. Initially she was not elected, however, on 20 March 2018, the Court of Cassation, following the exhaustion of M5S candidates in Campania, which were lower than the assigned seats, assigned the vacant seat in the "Campania 1" constituency to Lucia Azzolina, who was then proclaimed Deputy of the XVIII legislature.

On 13 September 2019 she was appointed Undersecretary of State to the Ministry of Education, University and Research in the Conte II Government. On 28 December 2019, following the resignation of Minister Lorenzo Fioramonti, Prime Minister Giuseppe Conte announced her imminent appointment as Minister of Education. On 10 January 2020 she was sworn in and officially took office.

In September 2021 she became head teacher of the school "Istituto Comprensivo Emanuele Giaracà" in Syracuse.

== Controversies ==
In May 2019, the weekly L'Espresso published a series of articles highlighting her participation in the competition as a school manager, published on 24 November 2017 and held between 2018 and 2019 (ranking at 2542th out of a total of 2900 places available in a competition attended by 35 thousand teachers), despite being vested with the position of member of the Parliamentary Education Commission of the Chamber. To criticisms of a feared conflict of interest, Azzolina replied stating that it was a competition for which she had been preparing since 2017.

On 27 December 2019, Massimo Arcangeli, President of the Commission for access to the role of school manager who judged the deputy's oral test, doubted the ability of the same in being able to carry out the role of Minister of Education, on the basis of test results. The Commission chaired by Arcangeli himself awarded 80.5 / 100 points to the written test and 75/100 points to the oral test.

On 11 January 2020, again Massimo Arcangeli, in the newspaper La Repubblica, sustained that some paragraphs of the thesis presented by her at the time for the qualification to teach would have been copied from specialist texts. After the news was published, opposition parties, including the League, asked for his resignation from government office. Lucia Azzolina replied to the accusations noting that it is neither a thesis nor a plagiarism, the written being a simple end-of-trainee report.

== Electoral history ==
Election	House	Constituency	Party	Votes	Result
2018	Chamber of Deputies	Piedmont 2	M5S	– (Note: Elected in a closed list proportional representation system.)	Elected
