= Together for the Future =

Together for the Future Insieme per il Futuro
- Leader: Luigi Di Maio
- Coordinator: Vincenzo Spadafora
- Founded: 21 June 2022
- Dissolved: 13 October 2022
- Split from: Five Star Movement
- Political position: Centre
- National affiliation: Civic Commitment

Together for the Future (Italian: Insieme per il Futuro, IpF) was a centrist political party in Italy, which for all of its existence was active solely as a parliamentary group. Its founder and leader was Luigi Di Maio. All of its parliamentary members were elected for the Five Star Movement (M5S) in the 2018 Italian general election but exited from the party in June 2022, when the M5S's former leader Di Maio decided to form his own political group, following tensions with M5S leader Giuseppe Conte.

Di Maio explained that IpF would not be a "personal party" and would reject populism, while being open to the contribution of people from different political experiences, especially mayors.

== History ==
During 2022, tensions grew within the Five Star Movement (M5S) between the party's president, Giuseppe Conte, and the party's former leader, Luigi Di Maio. The two main representatives of the movement clashed many times, primarily regarding the policies promoted by the government of Mario Draghi, in which Di Maio served as foreign minister. The two politicians argued also in the run-up of the 2022 Italian presidential election, during which, at some point, Conte supported, along with League's leader Matteo Salvini, the candidacy of Elisabetta Belloni, and met Di Maio's opposition.

In early June 2022, Conte became particularly critical towards the government's approach to the Russian invasion of Ukraine and specifically the deployment of military aids to the Ukrainian government; as foreign minister, Di Maio, defended it. Di Maio also labeled the new party's leadership as "immature", and said it was weak on Atlanticism, while Conte and his allies threatened to eject Di Maio from the M5S.

On 21 June, Di Maio, along with several deputies and senators, left the M5S and launched IpF. During a press conference, Di Maio stated: "We had to choose which side of history to stand. The leaders of the Five Star Movement risked to weaken Italy, putting the government in jeopardy for reasons related to their own consensus crisis. I thank the Movement for what it has done for me, but from today a new path begins." On the following day, the group was officially established in the Chamber of Deputies, with 51 members, while in Senate 10 senators joined IpF, and formed a joint group with the Democratic Centre (CD). Moreover, two members of the European Parliament (Daniela Rondinelli and Chiara Maria Gemma) and three regional councillors in Campania and one councillor in Abruzzo also left the M5S to join the new party.

On 1 August, Di Maio and CD leader Bruno Tabacci launched the Civic Commitment electoral alliance in preparation for contesting the 2022 general election.

After the poor electoral result, Di Maio and most party members retired from politics, and the party was effectively disbanded.

== Leadership ==
- Political coordinator: Vincenzo Spadafora
- Political manifesto coordinator: Giuseppe L'Abbate
- Leader in the Chamber of Deputies: Iolanda Di Stasio
- Leader in the Senate: Primo Di Nicola

== Electoral Results ==
=== Italian Parliament ===
Election	Leader	Chamber of Deputies					Senate of the Republic				
Election	Leader	Votes	%	Seats	+/–	Position	Votes	%	Seats	+/–	Position
2022	Luigi Di Maio	Into IC		0 / 400	New	15th	Into IC		0 / 200	New	15th
