= Lavinia Mennuni =

Italian politician (born 1976)

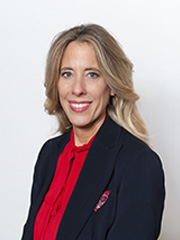
- Mennuni in 2022

Member of the Senate
- Incumbent
- Assumed office 13 October 2022
- Constituency: Lazio – 02

Personal details
- Born: 17 April 1976 (age 50)
- Party: Brothers of Italy (since 2015)

Lavinia Mennuni (born 17 April 1976) is an Italian politician serving as a member of the Senate since 2022. She was a member of the City Council of Rome from 2008 to 2015 and from 2018 to 2022.

== Biography ==
Born in Southampton, England, she earned her high school diploma in languages from the Istituto Sacro Cuore Trinità dei Monti in Rome and her law degree from the Sapienza University of Rome in 2003. She has been practicing law since 2008 and has served as a senator of the Republic since 2022.

She is married to Federico Guidi, a former Rome city council member and chair of the Metropolitan City of Rome Capital Budget Committee, and has three children.
