= Lorenzo Fioramonti =

Italian political scientist

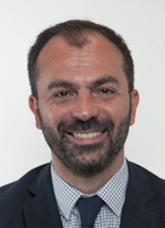
- Fioramonti in 2018

Minister of Education, University and Research
- In office 5 September 2019 – 25 December 2019
- Prime Minister: Giuseppe Conte
- Preceded by: Marco Bussetti
- Succeeded by: Lucia Azzolina (Education); Gaetano Manfredi (University)

Member of the Chamber of Deputies
- Incumbent
- Assumed office 23 March 2018
- Constituency: Lazio

Personal details
- Born: 29 April 1977 (age 49) Rome, Italy
- Party: Five Star Movement (2018–19); Green Italia (2020–present)
- Education: University of Rome Tor Vergata; University of Siena

Lorenzo Fioramonti (born 29 April 1977, in Rome, Italy) is a political scientist and former Italian Minister of Education, University and Research. Fioramonti is currently Director of the Institute for Sustainability at the University of Surrey. Prior to joining the University of Surrey, Fioramonti was a professor of political economy at the University of Pretoria and an associate fellow of the Centre for the Study of Governance Innovation.

== Career ==
In 2017, two books by Fioramonti were published Wellbeing Economy: Success in a World Without Growth and The World After GDP: Economics, Politics and International Relations in the Post-Growth Era, in May and March respectively. According to the Financial Times, Fioramonti argues that GDP is "not only a distorted mirror in which to view our increasingly complex economies, but also an impediment to building better societies."

== Publications ==
Fioramonti has co-authored and co-edited a total of ten books. Fioramonti's books include the bestselling Gross Domestic Problem: The Politics Behind the World’s Most Powerful Number and How Numbers Rule the World: The Use and Abuse of Statistics in Global Politics. According to The Hedgehog Review, Gross Domestic Problem is one three most influential books on the gross domestic product published in the 21st century.

According to Public Books, Fioramonti’s research shows that “the reliance on GDP derives from a technocratic worldview that glorifies experts, corrodes communal values, and devalues the natural world.”" For the LSE Review of Books, his research is a kind of “psychopath’s guide to bullying the world by numbers”, unmasking the pretension that “everything is ‘rational’, ‘independent’ and ‘objective’ and building fortresses of power around these intentional misrepresentations” . Fioramonti’s work has been endorsed by public intellectuals such as Vandana Shiva, Susan George, Raj Patel and Kumi Naidoo, the former executive director of the environmental organization Greenpeace. Fioramonti is also the first Jean Monnet Programme Chair in Africa and the president of the European Union Studies Association of Sub-Saharan Africa. By 2014, he also holds the UNESCO/UNU Chair in Regional Integration, Migration and Free Movement of People.

== Positions ==
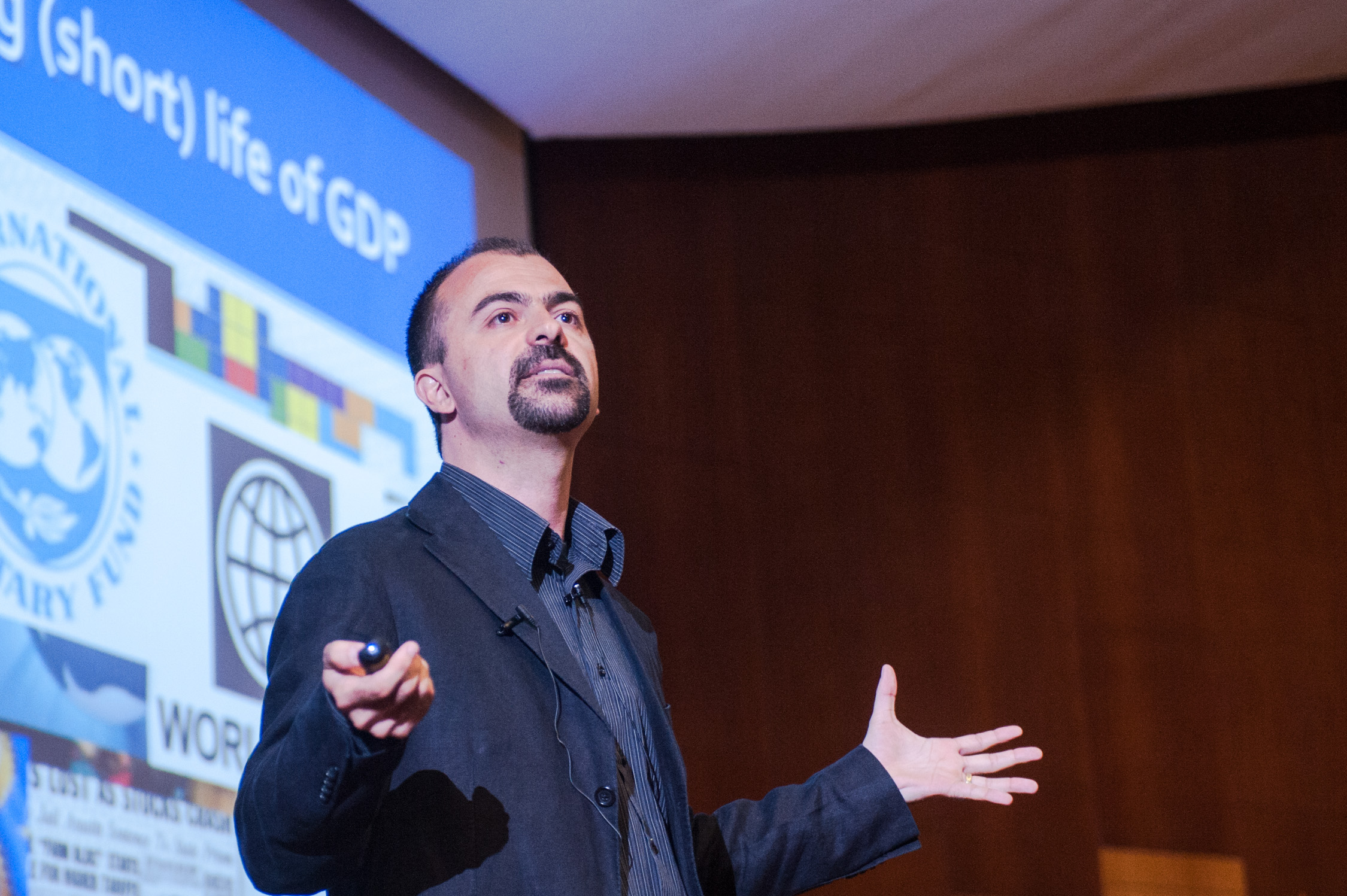
Lorenzo Fioramonti in 2013

He is a fellow of the Centre for Social Investment of the University of Heidelberg, of the Hertie School of Governance and of the United Nations University. His articles have appeared in The New York Times, The Guardian, the Harvard Business Review, Die Presse, Der Freitag, the Mail & Guardian, Foreign Policy and openDemocracy. He has a monthly column in the Business Day, South Africa’s leading financial newspaper.

== Politics ==
Fioramonti was nominated in January 2018, as a candidate for the Five Star Movement in the 2018 Italian general election.

On 5 September 2019, Fioramonti was named Italian Minister of Public Education. On 5 November 2019, Fioramonti announced that from the following year Italy would become the first country in the world where the study of climate change and sustainable development will be mandatory for students. On 18 November 2019, he stated that if there was not an additional €3 billion in funding in the 2020 budget for the Ministry of Education, he would resign as minister.

On 25 December 2019 Fioramonti resigned from government in protest. He objected to the government not providing significant extra funding in the 2020 budget for the Ministry of Education. His decision was faced with strong criticism from his colleagues in the government and in the Five Star Movement, causing his resignation from the M5S on 30 December 2019.
