= Simon Zadek =

British writer and advisor on business and sustainability

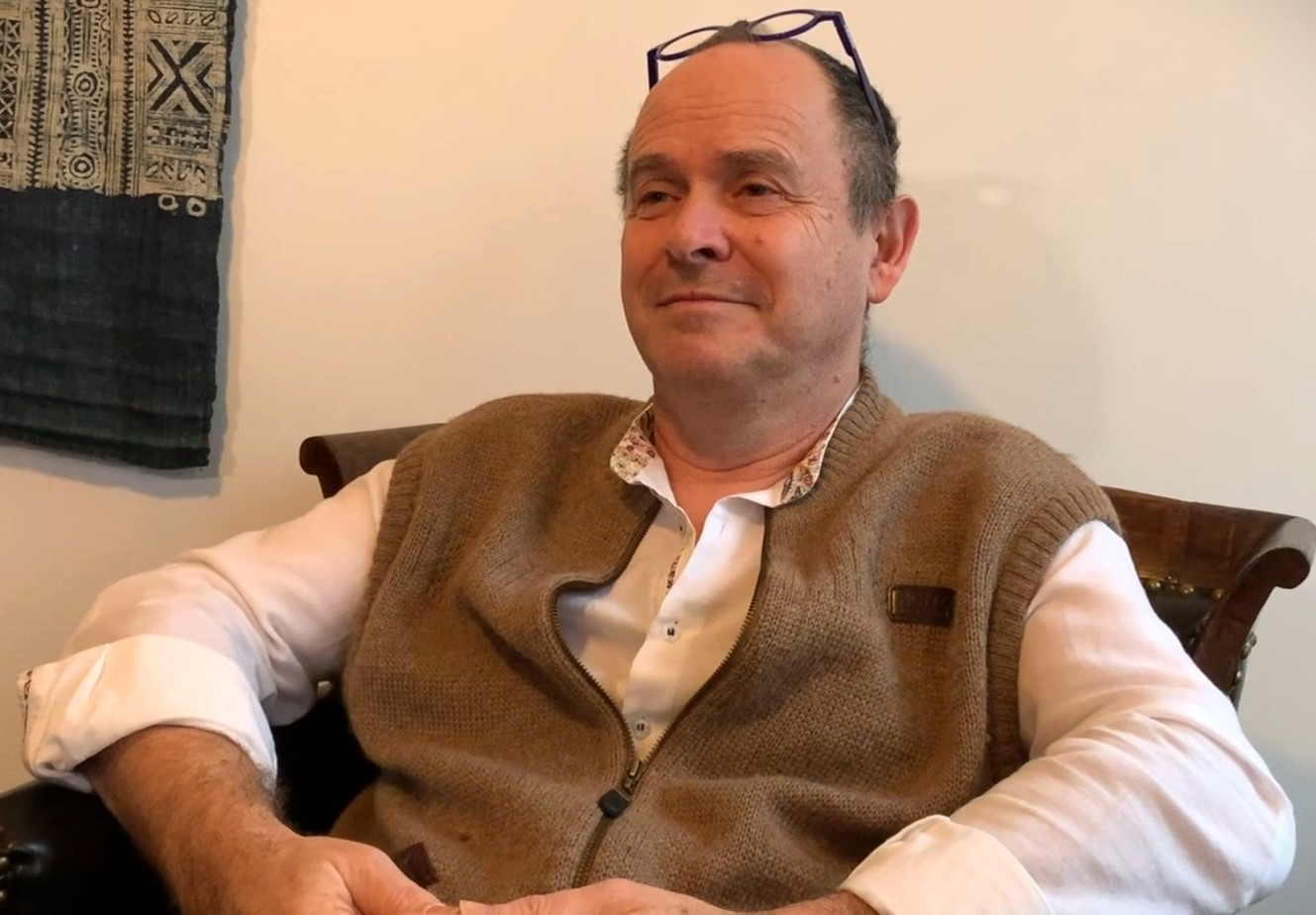
- Zadek in 2019
- Born: 16 July 1957 (age 69); London, England
- Citizenship: British

Academic work
- Discipline: Sustainability; Economics; Corporate responsibility Green growth

Simon Zadek (born 16 July 1957) is a writer and advisor, focused on business and sustainability. He is the co-Founder and Managing Partner of Morphosis, an adaptation investment business. He was Founding CEO of NatureFinance, a non-profit organization aiming to align global finance with nature positive outcomes.

== Background ==
Zadek grew up in London, later attending Bristol University (BSc Economics, 1979), he also has a PhD in Economics from Brunel University (An economics of Utopia: the democratisation of scarcity, 1992). He reports that the dissertation topic was rejected by potential supervisors at the University of Oxford and LSE, before he enrolled at Brunel. Most recently he has lived in China and Geneva.

== Career ==
Zadek has held a number of positions broadly concerned with supporting alternative economic development and sustainable business activity. Together with Julie McCarthy he currently serves as Co-CEO of NatureFinance. Before, he was Co-Director of the UNEP Inquiry into the Design of a Sustainable Financial System, which started in 2014 in Geneva.

From 1979 to 1981 he was an economic planner for the Government of St Lucia, followed by a period of consulting with Coopers and Lybrand. In 1992 he joined the New Economics Foundation, becoming its Development Director and leading its work on corporate social responsibility. He helped to found AccountAbility in 1995, acting as its CEO from 2002 to 2009, and was Founding Chair of the Ethical Trading Initiative.

Positions in academic institutions have included:

- Visiting Fellow at the University of Sussex
- Visiting Professor at Copenhagen Business School
- Honorary Professor at the University of South Africa
- Senior Fellow at the Centre for Government and Business of Harvard University's Kennedy School (until 2011)
- Visiting Scholar at Tsinghua School of Economics and Management in Beijing
- Visiting Professor, DSM Senior Fellow in Partnership and Sustainability, Singapore Management University (2018)

He is also been an advisor to several green and business initiatives, including the Centre for International Governance Innovation (CIGI), the World Economic Forum, and the International Institute for Sustainable Development (IISD).

== Contributions ==
Zadek's early interests were in alternative, utopian, and Buddhist economics. But he became interested in the corporate social responsibility movement and particularity the development of social auditing techniques, when working at the New Economics Foundation (1992–1999) and then as founder and CEO of AccountAbility (1995–2009). Latterly he has worked on promoting green and responsible financial policies across the banking, insurance and investment sectors. He has developed environmental and social risk policies for banks and corporate clients, and argues insurers need to report their exposure to climate risks and their strategies for resilience.

== Recognition ==
In 2003 he was named as one of the World Economic Forum's 'Global Leaders of Tomorrow'.

Zadek's book, The Civil Corporation: the New Economy of Corporate Citizenship (2001/2007) received the Academy of Management's Best Book Social Issues Award in 2006 and has been called one of the most influential books on sustainability, by the Cambridge Programme for Sustainability Leadership.

== Writings ==
=== Books ===
- Simon Zadek. 2015. Eco-China Inc. Routledge, London. ISBN 1783531347
- Simon Zadek. 2001/2007. The Civil Corporation: the New Economy of Corporate Citizenship, Earthscan, London (2001, Second edition 2007)
- Simon Zadek, Peter Raynard. 2006. Tomorrow’s History: Selected Writings of Simon Zadek: 1994-2003. Earthscan, London (2006). ISBN 978-1874719854. ch 1
- (With Niels Højensgård and Peter Raynard (editors), Perspectives on the New Economy of Corporate Citizenship, The Copenhagen Centre, Copenhagen (2000)
- (With Jutta Blauert (editors)) Mediating Sustainability from the Grassroots, Kumarian, Hartford CT (1998)
- (With Peter Pruzan and Richard Evans (editors)) Building Corporate Accountability: Emerging Practices in Social and Ethical Accounting and Auditing. Earthscan, London (1997)
- Thake, Stephen and Simon Zadek (1997) Practical People, Noble Causes: How to Support Community Social Entrepreneurs, New Economics Foundation, London
- An Economics of Utopia: the Democratisation of Scarcity. Avebury, Aldershot (1992)

=== Selected articles and working papers ===
- Zadek, Simon (2017). Partnership alchemy: engagement, innovation and governance. In Perspectives on corporate citizenship edited by Jörg Andriof and Malcolm McIntosh. London: Routledge.
- Zadek, Simon, Maya Forstater and Kelly Yu (2012) The Political Economy of Responsible Business in China, Journal of Current Chinese Affairs, July 2012
- Zadek, Simon (2011) Civil Society and Market Transformation, in Michael Edwards (ed.), The Oxford Handbook of Civil Society. Oxford and New York: Oxford University Press, Oxford*Zadek, Simon (2011), “Beyond Climate Finance: From Accountability to Productivity in Addressing the Climate Challenge”, Climate Policy, Volume 11, Issue 3, June 2011: 1058-1068
- Zadek, Simon (2010) “Emerging Nations and Sustainability: Chimera or Leadership?”, Politeia, XXVI, 98, 2010. ISSN 1128-2401 pp. 153-167 (reproduced by Harvard University as Working Paper, 2010)
- Forstater, Maya, Simon Zadek, Yang Guang, Kelly Yu, Chen Xiao Hong, Mark George (2010) Corporate Responsibility in African Development, Working Paper, Corporate Social Responsibility Initiative, Harvard Kennedy School, Cambridge, Mass.
- Zadek, Simon (2008) Collaborative Governance: the New Multilateralism for the 21st Century, in Global Development 2.0, Brookings Institution, Washington DC
- Zadek, Simon and Alex MacGillivray (2008) “Responsible Competitiveness: Making Sustainability Count in Global Markets”, Harvard International Review, Summer 2008: 72-77
- Zadek, Simon (2006) “Corporate Responsibility and Competitiveness at the Macro Level”, Corporate Governance: Vol 6, No 4., 2006: 334-348
- Zadek, Simon and Sasha Radovich (2006) Governing Collaborative Governance: Enhancing Development Outcomes by Improving Partnership Governance and Accountability, Working Paper 23, Corporate Social Responsibility Initiative, Harvard Kennedy School, Cambridge, Mass.
- Zadek, Simon (2006) The Logic of Collaborative Governance: Corporate Responsibility, Accountability, and the Social Contract, Working Paper 17, Corporate Social Responsibility Initiative, Harvard Kennedy School, Cambridge, Mass.
- Zadek, Simon (2004) The path to Corporate Responsibility, Harvard Business Review, December 2004

The Guardian articles
