= Teresa Bellanova =

Italian politician and trade unionist

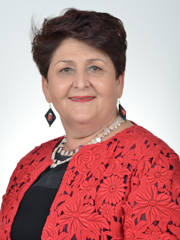

Minister of Agriculture
- In office 5 September 2019 – 14 January 2021
- Prime Minister: Giuseppe Conte
- Preceded by: Gian Marco Centinaio
- Succeeded by: Stefano Patuanelli

Member of the Senate of the Republic
- In office 23 March 2018 – 13 October 2022
- Constituency: Emilia-Romagna

Member of the Chamber of Deputies
- In office 28 April 2006 – 22 March 2018
- Constituency: Apulia

Personal details
- Born: 17 August 1958 (age 67) Ceglie Messapica, Italy
- Party: Italia Viva (since 2019)
- Other political affiliations: DS (1998–2007); PD (2007–2019)
- Profession: Politician; Trade unionist

Teresa Bellanova (born 17 August 1958) is an Italian politician, trade unionist and former farm worker, who served as Minister of Agriculture from September 2019 to January 2021 in the government of Giuseppe Conte. In 2018, she was elected in the Italian Senate for the Democratic Party (PD), but in 2019 she joined Italia Viva (IV), the new movement of Matteo Renzi. Bellanova was also a member of the Italian Chamber of Deputies from 2006 to 2018.

== Biography ==
=== Agricultural laborer and trade unionist ===
Teresa Bellanova was born near Brindisi, Apulia in 1958. At only 15 years old, she started working as an agricultural laborer and later joined the left-wing trade union CGIL, serving as regional coordinator of Federbraccianti. She worked in the south-east of Bari and then moved to the province of Lecce, to fight against the caporalato, the gang-master system in which people, usually migrants, are illegally recruited for agricultural labour for little or no pay and under slavery-like conditions.

In 1988, she was nominated to the post of Provincial General Secretary of the FLAI (Federation of Agro-industrial Workers) for Lecce. In 1996 she became General Secretary of the FILTEA (Italian Federation of Footwear Textile Clothing), a position she held until 2000, when she joined the FILTEA National Secretariat with responsibility for Southern Italy policies, industrial policies, labor market and professional training.

=== Political career ===
In 2005 she was elected member of the National Council of Democrats of the Left. On 22 April 2006 she was elected for the first time to the Chamber of Deputies within the centre-left The Olive Tree government of Romano Prodi. In the following year, she was a founding member of the Democratic Party, and was thus re-elected in the Chamber of Deputies for the second time in the 2008 election. From 21 May 2008 she was a member of the Commission for Public and Private Work.

Bellanova was re-elected again in the 2013 general election. On 28 February 2014 she was appointed Undersecretary of State to Labour Policies in the government of Matteo Renzi. On 29 January 2016 she was appointed Deputy Minister of Economic Development, a position she held both in the governments of Renzi and Paolo Gentiloni. In the 2018 general election, which was characterized by a strong showing of populist parties, she was elected in the Italian Senate for the first time, running in the multi-member constituency of Emilia-Romagna.

=== Minister of Agriculture (2019–2021) ===
In August 2019 tensions grew within the populist government, leading to the issuing of a motion of no-confidence on Prime Minister Giuseppe Conte by the League. After Conte's resignation, the national board of the PD officially opened to the possibility of forming a new cabinet in a coalition with the M5S, based on pro-Europeanism, green economy, sustainable development, fight against economic inequality and a new immigration policy. The party also accepted that Conte may continue at the head of a new government, and on 29 August President Sergio Mattarella formally invested Conte to do so. On 5 September 2019 Bellanova was appointed Minister of Agriculture.
