= Luigi Di Maio =

Italian politician (born 1986)

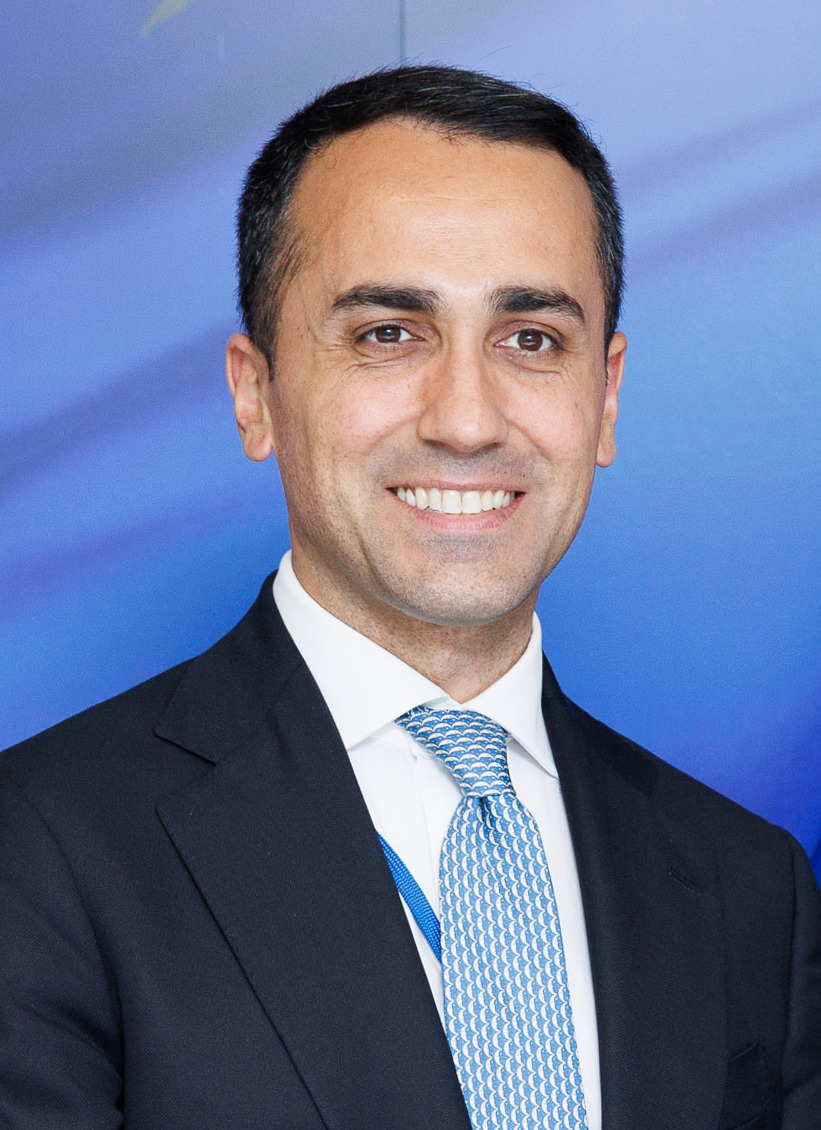
- Di Maio in 2023

EU Special Representative for the Gulf
- Incumbent
- Assumed office 1 June 2023
- Commissioner: Josep Borrell; Kaja Kallas
- Preceded by: Office established

Minister of Foreign Affairs
- In office 5 September 2019 – 22 October 2022
- Prime Minister: Giuseppe Conte; Mario Draghi
- Preceded by: Enzo Moavero Milanesi
- Succeeded by: Antonio Tajani

President of the Committee of Ministers of the Council of Europe
- In office 17 November 2021 – 20 May 2022
- Preceded by: Péter Szijjártó
- Succeeded by: Simon Coveney

Deputy Prime Minister of Italy
- In office 1 June 2018 – 5 September 2019 Serving with Matteo Salvini
- Prime Minister: Giuseppe Conte
- Preceded by: Angelino Alfano (2014)
- Succeeded by: Antonio Tajani (2022); Matteo Salvini (2022)

Minister of Economic Development
- In office 1 June 2018 – 5 September 2019
- Prime Minister: Giuseppe Conte
- Preceded by: Carlo Calenda
- Succeeded by: Stefano Patuanelli

Minister of Labour and Social Policies
- In office 1 June 2018 – 5 September 2019
- Prime Minister: Giuseppe Conte
- Preceded by: Giuliano Poletti
- Succeeded by: Nunzia Catalfo

Leader of the Five Star Movement
- In office 23 September 2017 – 22 January 2020
- Preceded by: Beppe Grillo
- Succeeded by: Vito Crimi

Member of the Chamber of Deputies
- In office 15 March 2013 – 13 October 2022
- Constituency: Campania 1 (2013–2018); Naples–Acerra (2018–2022)

Personal details
- Born: 6 July 1986 (age 40) Avellino, Italy
- Other political affiliations: M5S (2009–2022); IC–IpF (2022); Independent (2022–present)
- Domestic partner: Alessia D'Alessandro (since 2023)
- Children: 1

Luigi Di Maio (Note: Italian pronunciation: [luˈiːdʒi di ˈmaːjo]) (born 6 July 1986) is an Italian politician who has been serving as EU Special Representative for the Gulf region since 1 June 2023. Di Maio also served as Minister of Foreign Affairs from 2019 to 2022, as Deputy Prime Minister of Italy and Minister of Economic Development, Labour and Social Policies from 2018 to 2019, and as Vice President of the Chamber of Deputies in the 17th Italian legislature.

From September 2017 to January 2020, Di Maio was the leader of the Five Star Movement, an anti-establishment party founded by Beppe Grillo. He resigned from this position to quell discontent and stem the flow of party desertions and expulsions after he led the party into coalition with the centre-left Democratic Party. In June 2022, Di Maio left the Five Star Movement due to tensions with Giuseppe Conte over providing support for Ukraine against the Russian invasion, founding his own political group, Together for the Future (IpF). IpF had a brief life, being disbanded following a poor performance in the 2022 Italian general election (in which it ran within the Civic Commitment electoral list alongside Democratic Centre).

== Early life ==
Luigi Di Maio was born in Avellino in 1986; he was the eldest of three brothers. His father Antonio was a small real estate entrepreneur and local councilor for the Italian Social Movement (MSI), while his mother was a teacher of Italian and Latin.

Di Maio attended the Liceo classico, and then he enrolled at the University of Naples Federico II to study engineering, but after failing, subsequently changed to law.

Di Maio is a dropout and never graduated from university.

In 2007, he was registered as an apprentice journalist, later attempting to work as a webmaster. He would then become a concessions vendor selling water at the Stadio San Paolo in Naples.

== Political career ==
In 2007, Di Maio was among the founders of the political group "Friends of Beppe Grillo", the predecessors of the Five Star Movement (M5S), founded by the popular comedian in October 2009.

In 2010, he ran in the Council elections of Pomigliano, in which the Five Star Movement obtained 548 votes and Di Maio 59, ranking first among the candidates of his party, but not enough to be elected.

=== 2013 general election ===
In the 2013 election, he was nominated as candidate for the M5S with 189 online votes and elected to the Chamber of Deputies of the Italian Parliament at 26 years old. On 21 March 2013, he became the youngest Vice President of the Chamber of Deputies.

On 12 July 2017, Di Maio was formally investigated for defamation following a complaint filed by Marika Cassimatis, former M5S mayoral candidate in Genoa, while, on 28 July 2017, the journalist Elena Polidori filed a complaint against him also for defamation. Di Maio invoked his parliamentary immunity; he had previously criticized that privilege and pledged never to avail himself of it.

In 2017, Beppe Grillo announced that he would campaign in the 2018 election, but he would not be the candidate for the position of prime minister. Di Maio was considered the frontrunner and the most likely candidate for the premiership of Italy.

Di Maio has often been labelled as the most pragmatic and "institutional", but also the least populist Five Star politician; he is considered the leader of the moderate and "governmental" faction of the movement. No other leading members of the M5S, such as Alessandro Di Battista, a politician and personal friend of Di Maio, or Roberto Fico, leader of the M5S left-wing faction and rival of Di Maio and Di Battista, would run for the office.

Di Maio's opponents were the Senator Elena Fattori (Vice President of the 9th Permanent Senate Committee) and six other city councillors. Many of them were almost unknown and this led to a lot of criticism from the Democratic Party, Lega Nord and Forza Italia, which considered this ballot a false primary election, with the only aim of appointing Di Maio as M5S candidate without any real challenger.

=== 2018 general election ===
In September 2017 Di Maio was elected Prime Ministerial candidate and Political Head of the M5S, with more than 82% of the vote.

Before the 2018 general election, Di Maio announced a referendum to quit the Euro and stated his position to leave. He proposed to dismantle the NATO alliance and criticised the United States commitment against Russia.

In the 2018 general election, the M5S became the party with the largest number of votes and of parliamentary seats, while the centre-right alliance, in which Matteo Salvini's League emerged as the main political force, won a plurality of seats in the Chamber of Deputies and in the Senate and the centre-left coalition, led by former Prime Minister Matteo Renzi, came third. However, no political group or party won an outright majority, resulting in a hung parliament.

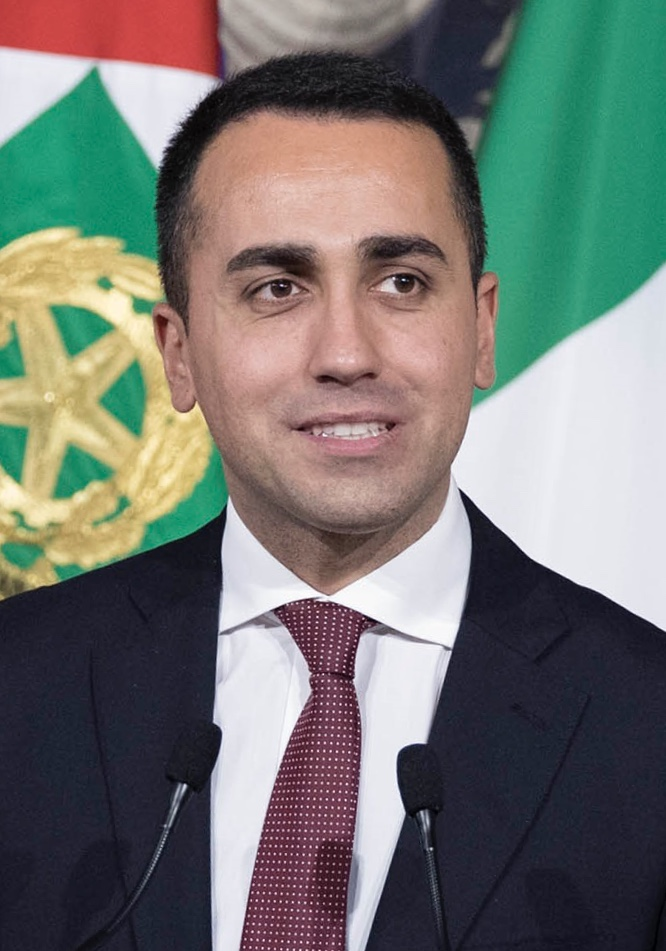
Di Maio in May 2018

On 7 April, Di Maio made an appeal to the PD to "bury the hatchet" and consider a governing coalition with his party.

On 7 May, President Mattarella held a third round of government formation talks, after which he formally confirmed the lack of any possible majority (M5S rejecting an alliance with the whole centre-right coalition, PD rejecting an alliance with both M5S and the centre-right coalition, and the League's Matteo Salvini refusing to start a government with M5S but without Silvio Berlusconi's Forza Italia party, whose presence in the government was explicitly vetoed by M5S's leader Luigi Di Maio); on the same circumstance, he announced his intention to soon appoint a "neutral government" (irrespective of M5S and League's refusal to support such an option) to take over from the Gentiloni Cabinet which was considered unable to lead Italy into a second consecutive election as it was representing a majority from a past legislature, and offering an early election in July (on what it would be the very first time for a summer general election in Italy) as a realistic option to take into consideration due to the deadlock situation. The Lega and M5S agreed to hold new elections on 8 July, an option that was however rejected by all other parties.

On 9 May, after a day of rumours surfaced, both Di Maio and Salvini officially requested President Mattarella to give them 24 more hours to strike a government agreement between the two parties. Later the same day, in the evening, Silvio Berlusconi publicly announced Forza Italia would not support a M5S-League government on a vote of confidence, but he would still maintain the centre-right alliance nonetheless, thus opening the doors to a possible majority government between the two parties.

On 13 May 5 Star Movement and League reached an agreement in principle on a government program, likely clearing the way for the formation of a governing coalition between the two parties, but could not find an agreement regarding the members of a government cabinet, most importantly, the prime minister. M5S and League leaders met with Italian President Sergio Mattarella on 14 May to guide the formation of a new government. On their meeting with President Mattarella, both parties asked for an additional week of negotiations to agree on a detailed government program and a prime minister to lead the joint government. Both M5S and the League announced their intention to ask their respective members to vote on the government agreement by the weekend.

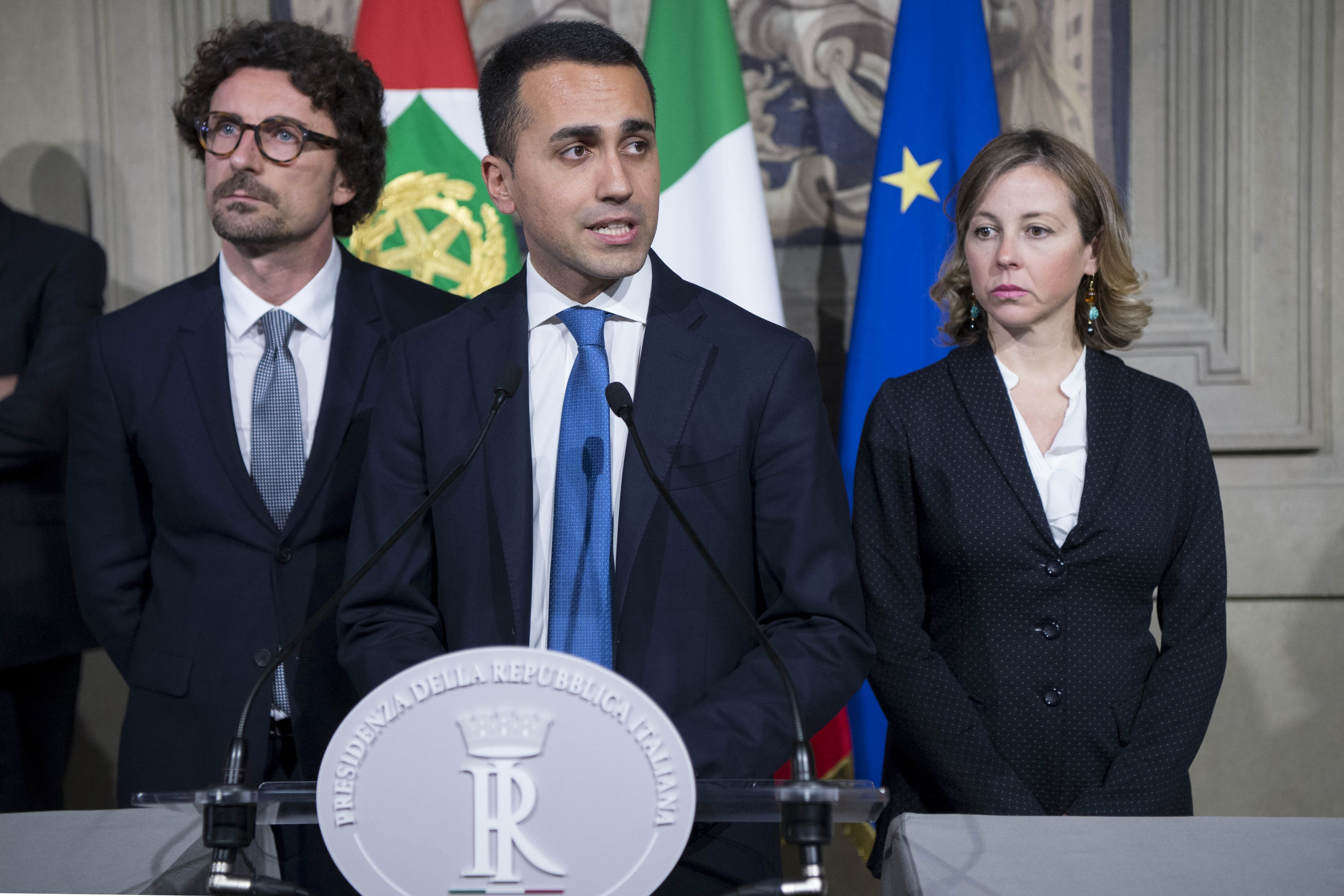
Di Maio at the Quirinal Palace in April 2018.

On 21 May 2018, Di Maio and Salvini proposed the private law professor Giuseppe Conte for the role of Prime Minister in the 2018 Italian government, despite reports in the Italian press suggesting that President Mattarella still had significant reservations about the direction of the new government. On 23 May 2018, Conte was invited to the Quirinal Palace to receive the presidential mandate to form a new cabinet. In the traditional statement after the appointment, Conte said that he would be the “defense lawyer of Italian people”.

However, Conte renounced to his office on 27 May due to the contrasts between Salvini and President Mattarella. In fact, Salvini proposed the university professor Paolo Savona as Minister of Economy and Finances, but Mattarella strongly opposed him, considering Savona too Eurosceptic and anti-German. In his speech after Conte's resignation, Mattarella declared that the two parties wanted to bring Italy out of the Eurozone, and as the guarantor of the Italian Constitution and the country's interest and stability, he could not allow this.

On the following day, Mattarella gave Carlo Cottarelli, a former director of the International Monetary Fund, the task of forming a new government. On 28 May 2018, the Democratic Party (PD) announced that it would abstain from voting the confidence to Cottarelli, while the Five Star Movement and the center-right parties Forza Italia (FI), Brothers of Italy (FdI) and the League announced their vote against.

Cottarelli was expected to submit his list of ministers for approval to President Mattarella on 29 May. However, on 29 and 30 May he held only informal consultations with the President, waiting for the formation of a “political government”. Meanwhile, Matteo Salvini and Luigi Di Maio announced their willingness to restart the negotiations to form a political government, Giorgia Meloni, leader of FdI, gave her support to the initiative. On 31 May, M5S and the League reached an agreement to form a new government, without Paolo Savona as finance minister (he became minister of European affairs instead), and with Conte at its head.

=== Deputy Prime Minister (2018–2019) ===
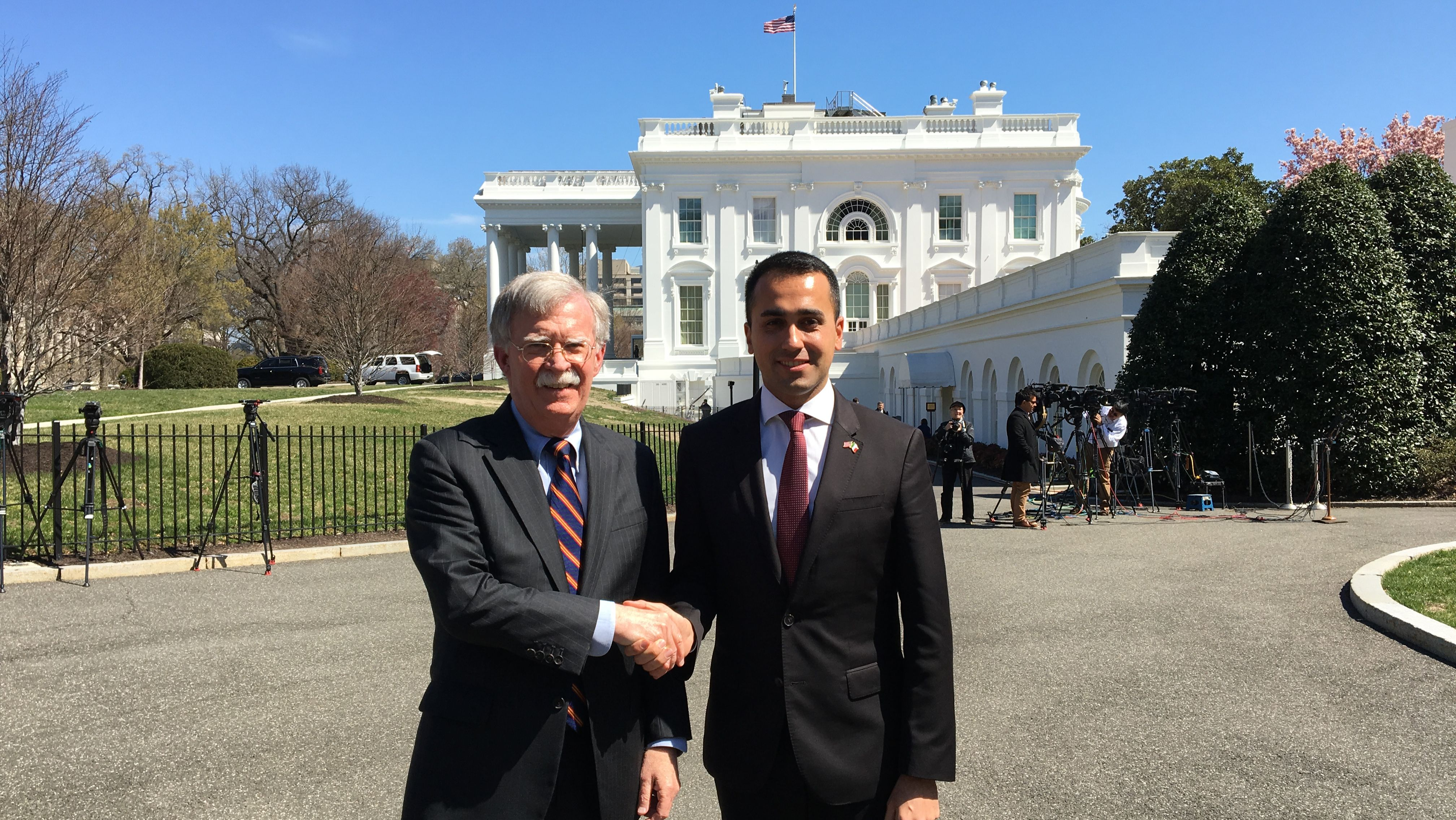
Di Maio with U.S. National Security Advisor John Bolton at the White House in 2019

Di Maio was sworn in as Deputy Prime Minister and Minister of Economic Development, Labour and Social Policies in the first Conte government on 1 June 2018.

As minister, he implemented the so-called "citizens' income" (Italian: reddito di cittadinanza), a system of social welfare provision that provides a basic income and assistance in finding a job to poor people and families, which was one of the main proposal of the M5S 2018 campaign. The income was set to a maximum of €780 per month, and in its first year the program had almost 2.7 million applications.

In May 2019, Di Maio's party suffered a huge defeat, changing from 32,68% (March 2018) till 17,06%, the biggest change in history in 14 months.

In August 2019, Di Maio's co-serving Deputy Prime Minister, Salvini, announced a motion of no confidence against Conte, after growing tensions within the majority and after Salvini was trying to lead the government after massively winning the elections of May 2019. Salvini's move came right after a vote in the Senate regarding the progress of the Turin–Lyon high-speed railway, in which the Lega voted against an attempt of the M5S to block the construction works. Many political analysts believe the no confidence motion was an attempt to force early elections to improve Lega's standing in Parliament, ensuring Salvini could become the next prime minister. On 20 August, following the parliamentary debate in which Conte harshly accused Salvini of being a political opportunist who "had triggered the political crisis only to serve his personal interest", the Prime Minister resigned his post to President Sergio Mattarella.

=== Minister of Foreign Affairs (2019–2022) ===
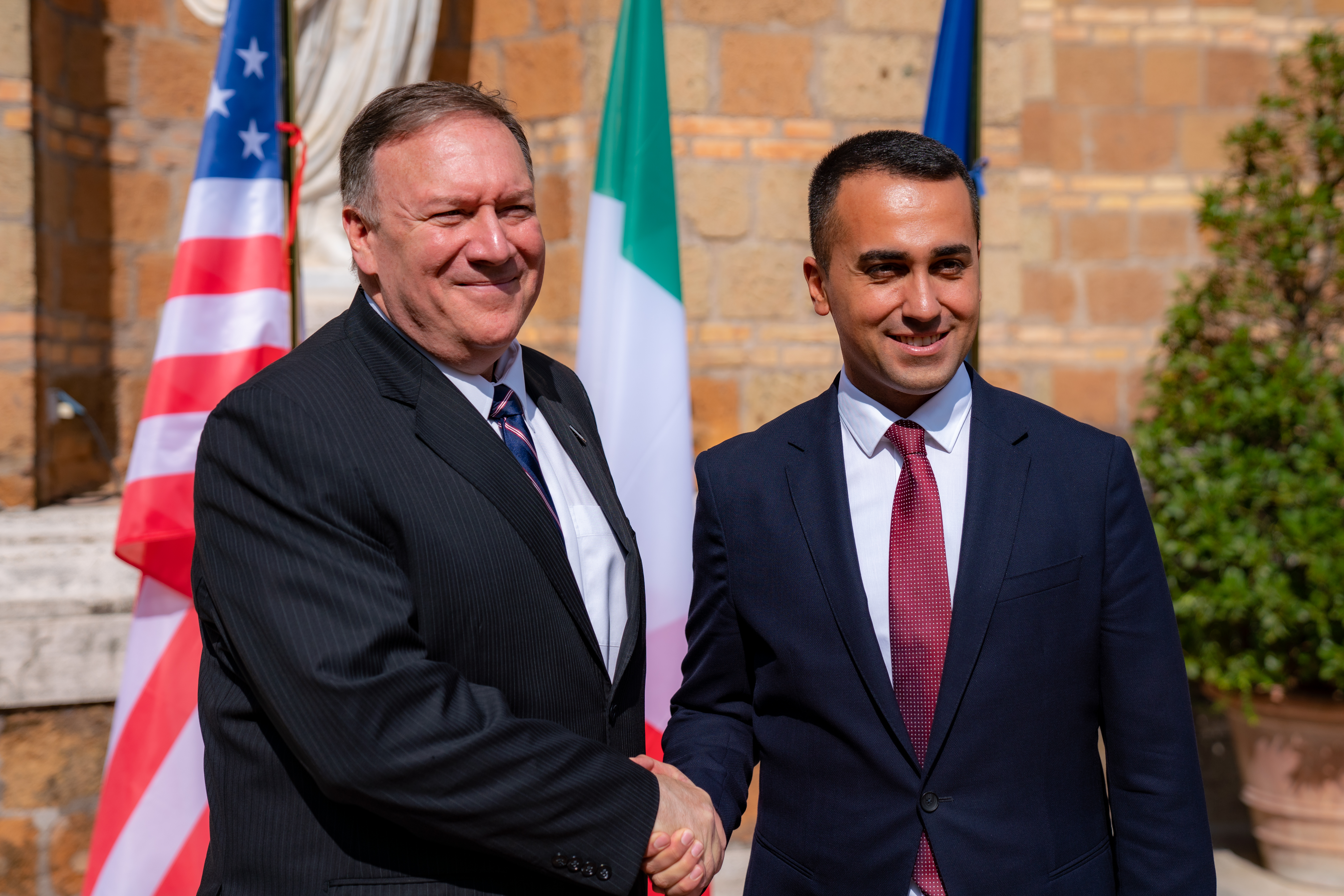
Di Maio with the U.S. Secretary of State Mike Pompeo in October 2019

After Conte's resignation, the national board of the PD officially opened to the possibility of forming a new cabinet in a coalition with the M5S, based on pro-Europeanism, green economy, sustainable development, fight against economic inequality and a new immigration policy. Di Maio was initially contrary, and rumours grew about the possibility of forming a second cabinet between M5S and Lega, with Di Maio himself as PM. However, the PD later accepted the M5S offer to keep Conte as head of the new government, and on 29 August President Mattarella formally invested Conte to do so.

On 1 September, Five Star's founder Beppe Grillo strongly endorsed an alliance with the PD, describing it as a "unique occasion" to reform the country. After two days, on 3 September, the members of the Five Star Movement voted in favor of an agreement with the Democrats, under the premiership of Giuseppe Conte, with more than 79% of favorable votes out of nearly 80,000 voters. On 5 September, Di Maio was sworn in as Minister of Foreign Affairs in the new government.

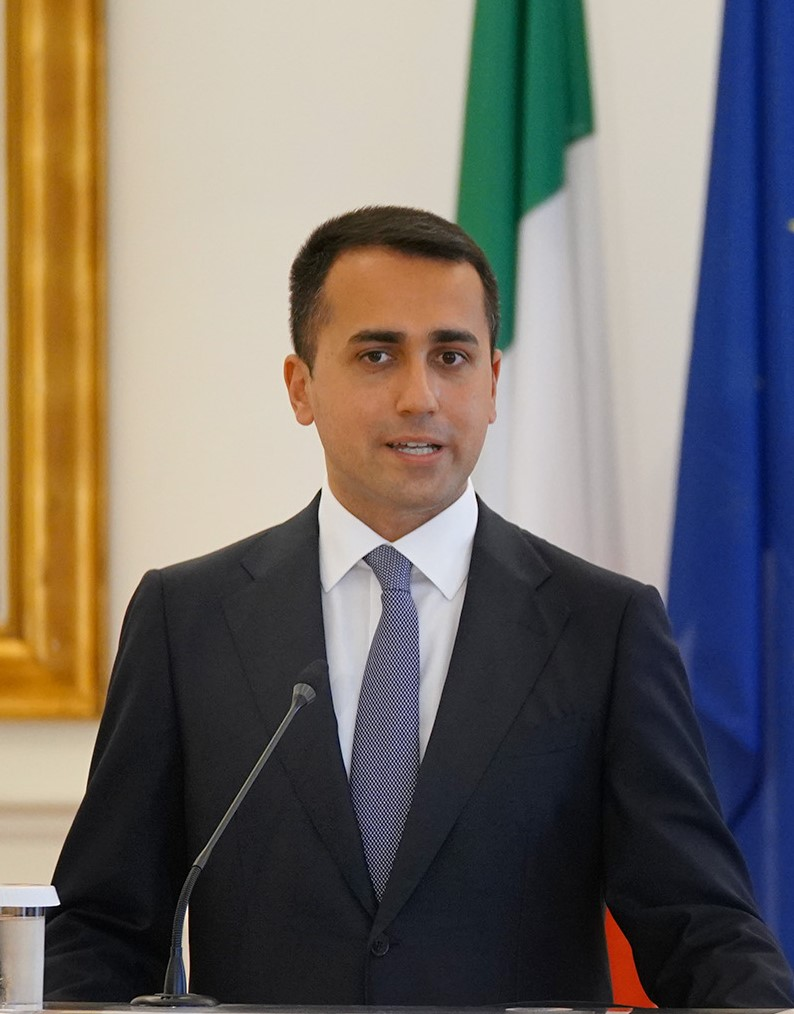
Di Maio in 2020

On 22 January 2020, four days before crucial elections in a few regions, Di Maio resigned as leader of the M5S, due to the increasing criticism for his choices as leader.

In early 2020, Di Maio supported the government-imposed nationwide lockdown in response to the COVID-19 pandemic.

In November 2018, Silvia Romano, a 23-year-old Italian aid worker, was kidnapped in Kenya by a group of terrorists linked to Al-Shabaab. On 9 May 2020, Conte announced her liberation in a tweet. Immediately after the announcement, speculations rose about the ransom paid to the kidnappers, which according to some sources stood at around €4 million. Moreover, Romano became the target of a hate campaign by the right-wing opposition due to her conversion to Islam, occurred during the captivity. During a discussion in the Chamber of Deputies, Alessandro Pagano, a member of the League, called her a "neo-terrorist".

Dombrovskis and Di Maio during the g7 in 2021

On 1 September 2020, two Italian fishing boats were detained by the Libyan Coast Guard, along with their crews of eighteen members total, while allegedly fishing in Libya's territorial waters in the Southern Mediterranean. Prime Minister Conte and Minister Di Maio asked for the immediately release, but the Libyan commander Khalifa Haftar denied it, demanding a prisoner exchange. On 17 December 2020, Conte announced that the eighteen fishermen were freed.

In December 2020, Di Maio announced the incoming transfer to Italy of Enrico "Chico" Forti, an Italian murderer who was sentenced to life imprisonment for the murder of Dale Pike, son of Ibiza Pikes Hotel owner Tony Pike. On 23 December, Di Maio stated: "This is an extremely important result, which rewards a long and patient political and diplomatic work. We have never forgotten Chico Forti, who will finally be able to return to his home country, close to his loved ones.". However Forti was never transferred to Italy as the deal was found to be poorly done and not applicable to Italian law.

In February 2021, Giuseppe Conte resigned as prime minister, following Italia Viva's withdrawal from the government. The former President of the European Central Bank, Mario Draghi, was invited by Italian President Sergio Mattarella to form a government of national unity. On 13 February, Di Maio was confirmed as Minister of Foreign Affairs.

In July 2021, Italy–United Arab Emirates relations hit their lowest point, when Italy became the only country in the world to impose sanctions on the United Arab Emirates. The UAE expelled Italian soldiers from the key military base of Al Minhad.

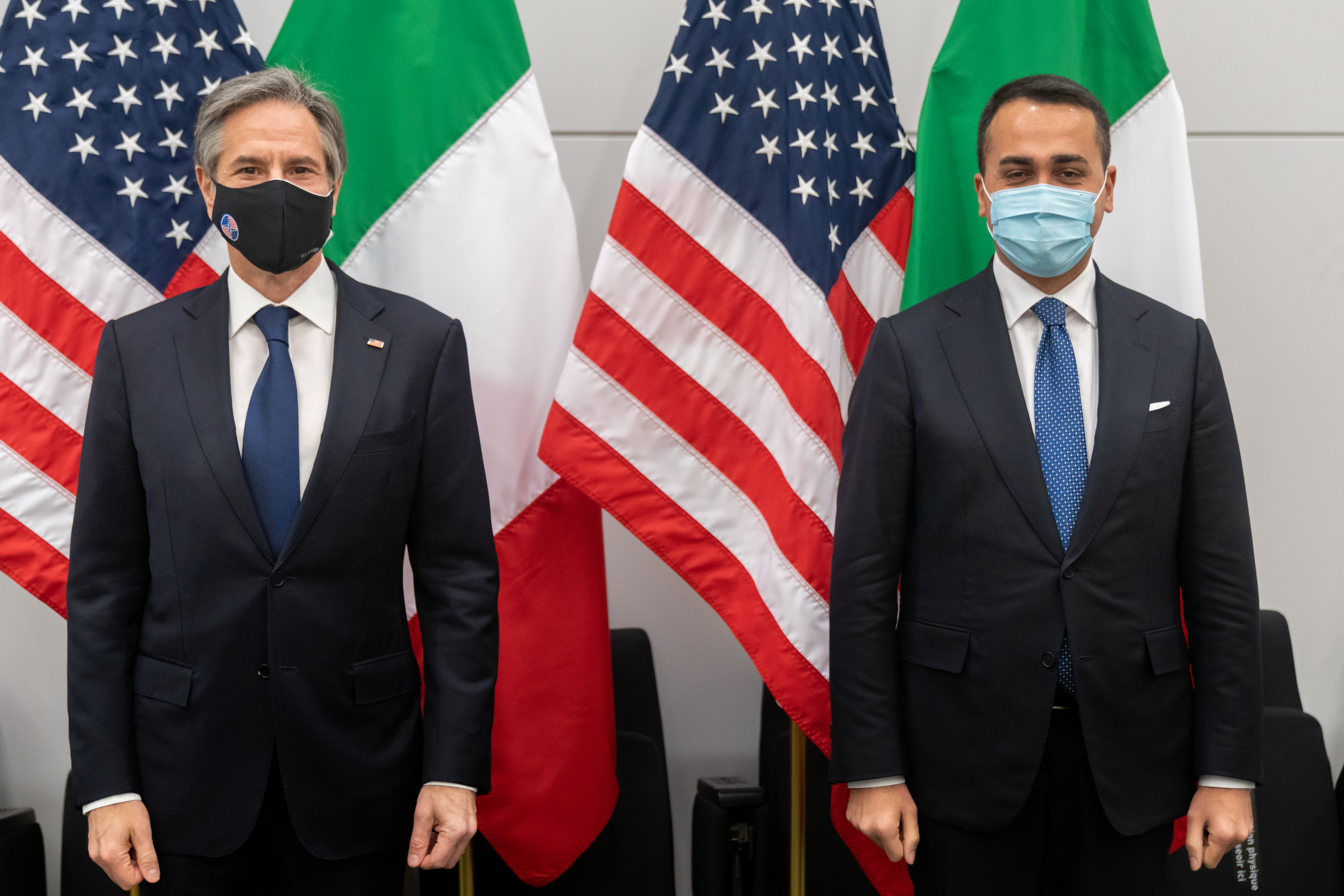
Di Maio with U.S. Secretary of State Antony Blinken in 2021

Amid the Russo-Ukrainian crisis, Di Maio went to Kyiv on 15 February 2022 to meet his Ukrainian counterpart Dmytro Kuleba, while on 17 February, Di Maio had a bilateral meeting with the Russian foreign affairs minister Sergey Lavrov. In Moscow, Di Maio stated that "Italy has always been committed to the front row for a diplomatic solution. [...] Russia and Ukraine can count on Italy to reach a diplomatic solution". On 24 February, Vladimir Putin announced a full-scale invasion of Ukraine; Di Maio harshly condemned Russia's attack, asking for the implementation of heavy international sanctions on Russia.

In 2022, tensions grew within the M5S between Conte and Di Maio; the two main representatives of the movement clashed many times regarding the policies promoted by the government as well as in the run-up of the 2022 presidential election, during which Conte briefly supported, along with Salvini, the candidacy of Elisabetta Belloni, opposed by Di Maio. In June 2022, Conte became particularly critic toward the government's approach to the war in Ukraine and the deployment of military aid to Kyiv's government; on the other hand, Di Maio strongly defended it. Di Maio also labeled the new party's leadership as "immature", while Conte and his closer allies threatened to expel Di Maio from the movement. On 21 June, Di Maio, along with several deputies and senators, left the M5S, founding their own political group, known as Together for the Future (IpF). During a press conference, Di Maio stated: "We had to choose which side of the history to stand. The leaders of the Five Star Movement risked weakening Italy, putting the government in difficulty for reasons related to their own consensus crisis. I thank the movement for what it has done for me, but from today a new path begins." As a result, Di Maio was strongly criticized both from many members of the M5S and from the M5S' founder himself, Grillo, being accused of betraying founding precepts of the M5S he himself had strongly advocated for in the past.

==== 2022 general election ====
On 1 August 2022, following the resignation of prime minister Draghi and the call for snap election to be held in September, Di Maio and Bruno Tabacci, leader of Democratic Centre (CD), founded Civic Commitment (IC), a centrist electoral alliance. In spite of the affiliation with the Democratic Party, in the election he lost his seat in Parliament, and after his departure from the Ministry of Foreign Affairs, he resigned from Civic Commitment leadership, bringing de facto an end to this electoral list.

=== After the government ===
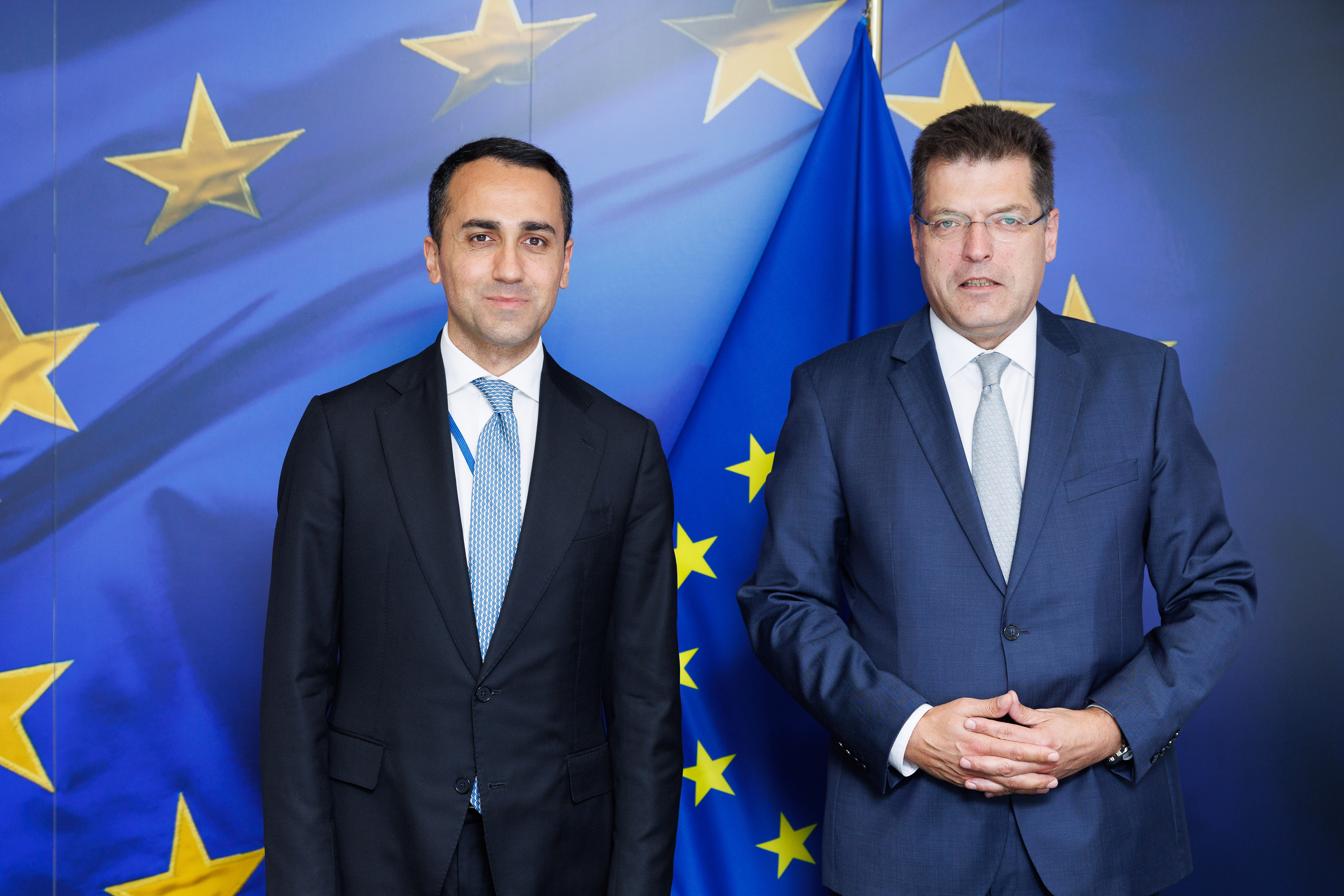
Di Maio with the European Commissioner Janez Lenarčič in 2023

Following the electoral defeat, Di Maio retired from politics. On 15 May 2023, he was elected Special Representative of the European Union for the Persian Gulf. His candidacy, despite being initially opposed by the new Italian government of Giorgia Meloni, was widely approved by the High Representative Josep Borrell and the European Council. Di Maio officially will hold the position from 1 June 2023, with the aim of developing a stronger, comprehensive and more strategic partnership with the countries in the Gulf. In January 2025, Borrell's successor Kaja Kallas confirmed Di Maio as Special Representative for two more years.

In May 2026, Di Maio became a member of the European Council on Foreign Relations.

== Personal life ==
In 2023, Di Maio began a relationship with Alessia D'Alessandro, a former candidate for the M5S in the 2018 election. The couple has a son, Gabriel, born in September 2024.

== Electoral history ==
Election	House	Constituency	Party	Votes	Result
2013	Chamber of Deputies	Campania 1	M5S	– (Note: Elected in a closed list proportional representation system.)	Elected
2018	Chamber of Deputies	Campania 1 – Acerra	M5S	95,219	Elected
2022	Chamber of Deputies	Campania 1 – Fuorigrotta	IC	41,743	Not elected

=== First-past-the-post elections ===
2018 general election (C): Acerra
Candidate	Party	Votes	%
Luigi Di Maio	Five Star Movement	95,219	63.4
Vittorio Sgarbi	Centre-right coalition	30,596	20.4
Antonio Falcone	Centre-left coalition	18,018	12.0
Others		6,315	4.1
Total		150,148	100.0

2022 general election (C): Fuorigrotta
Candidate	Party	Votes	%
Sergio Costa	Five Star Movement	67,936	39.7
Luigi Di Maio	Centre-left coalition	41,743	24.4
Mariarosaria Rossi	Centre-right coalition	38,515	22.5
Mara Carfagna	Action – IV	12,144	7.1
Others		10,700	6.3
Total		171,038	100.0

Party political offices
Preceded by Beppe Grillo	Leader of the Five Star Movement; 2017–2020	Succeeded by Vito Crimi
Political offices
Preceded by Angelino Alfano	Deputy Prime Minister of Italy; 2018–2019; Served alongside: Matteo Salvini	Succeeded by Antonio Tajani & Matteo Salvini
Preceded by Carlo Calenda	Minister of Economic Development; 2018–2019	Succeeded by Stefano Patuanelli
Preceded by Giuliano Poletti	Minister of Labour and Social Policies; 2018–2019	Succeeded by Nunzia Catalfo
Preceded by Enzo Moavero Milanesi	Minister of Foreign Affairs; 2019–2022	Succeeded by Antonio Tajani
