= Minister without portfolio (Italy) =

In the Italian government, ministers without portfolio (Italian: ministro senza portafoglio) are nominated by the President of the Council of Ministers (Prime Minister) and formally appointed by the President of the Republic to lead particular departments directly under the Presidency (or Presidium) of the Council of Ministers. Unlike the office of State Undersecretary to the Presidency, who fulfills duties in the Prime Minister's remit, ministers without portfolio enjoy the full status of ministers but do not lead an independent ministry. Departments on equalities, European affairs, and relations with regions, for example, are usually led by ministers without portfolio.

== List of ministers ==
1944

- Giuseppe Saragat

The Monti Cabinet (2011 to 2013) had six ministers without portfolio:

- Dino Piero Giarda (Relations with Parliament)
- Fabrizio Barca (Territorial cohesion)
- Piero Gnudi (Regional affairs, Tourism and Sport)
- Enzo Moavero Milanesi (European affairs)
- Andrea Riccardi (Integration and International cooperation)
- Filippo Patroni Griffi (Public Administration and Law simplification)

The Letta Cabinet (2013 to 2014) had eight ministers without portfolio:

- Josefa Idem (Equal opportunities, Sport and Youth policy; resigned in June)
- Cécile Kyenge (Integration and Youth Policy)
- Giampiero D'Alia (Public Administration)
- Dario Franceschini (Relations with Parliament)
- Enzo Moavero Milanesi (European affairs)
- Graziano Delrio (Regional affairs and Sport)
- Carlo Trigilia (Territorial cohesion)
- Gaetano Quagliariello (Constitutional reforms)

The Renzi Cabinet (2014 to 2016) had three ministers without portfolio:

- Maria Elena Boschi (Constitutional Reforms and Parliamentary Relations)
- Marianna Madia (Simplification of Public Administration)
- Maria Carmela Lanzetta (2014–2015) (Regional Affairs)
