= Letta government =

62nd government of the Italian Republic

- 62nd Cabinet of Italy

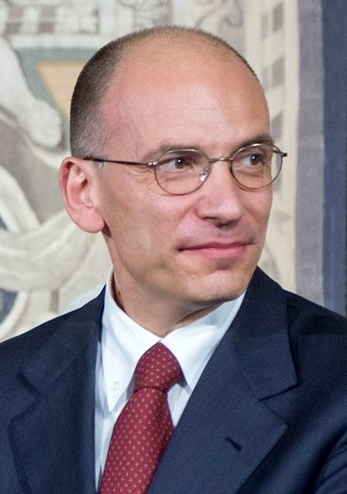
- Date formed: 28 April 2013
- Date dissolved: 22 February 2014 (301 days)

People and organisations
- Head of state: Giorgio Napolitano
- Head of government: Enrico Letta
- No. of ministers: 22 (including Prime Minister)
- Member parties: Until November 2013: PD, PdL, SC, UdC, RI; After November 2013: PD, NCD, SC, PpI, UdC, RI
- Status in legislature: Until November 2013: Supermajority (grand coalition); After November 2013; Majority (coalition)
- Opposition parties: M5S, LN, SEL, FdI, FI (after November 2013)

History
- Election: 2013 election
- Legislature term: XVII Legislature (2013–2018)
- Predecessor: Monti government
- Successor: Renzi government

The Letta government was the 62nd government of the Italian Republic. In office from 28 April 2013 to 22 January 2014, it comprised ministers of the Democratic Party (PD), The People of Freedom (PdL), Civic Choice (SC), the Union of the Centre (UdC), one of the Italian Radicals (RI), and three non-party independents. Led by the PD deputy-secretary Enrico Letta as Prime Minister of Italy, the government was referred to by journalists as a "grand coalition" (Italian: grande coalizione), or "government of broad agreements" (Italian: governo di larghe intese).

At formation, the Letta government benefited from a supermajority in the Italian Parliament, one of the largest in the history of the Italian Republic. It was the youngest government to date, with a median age of 53. It was sworn in on 28 April 2013 and won the confidence vote in the Chamber of Deputies on 29 April, and then the Senate of Republic on 30 April.

== History ==
=== Formation ===
The 2013 Italian general election, held on 24–25 February, saw the rise of the Five Star Movement (M5S) and the lack of a common majority in both houses of Parliament. More specifically, the centre-left coalition (known as Italy. Common Good) was ahead of the centre-right coalition but controlled a majority only in the Chamber of Deputies, meaning there was a hung parliament. The election was followed by weeks of deadlock, including various failed attempts either to elect a new President of Italy to succeed Giorgio Napolitano and form a government, the establishment of a panel of experts by the President himself (the "wise men") in order to outline priorities and formulate an agenda to deal with the persistent economic hardship and growing unemployment, and ultimately the resignation of Pier Luigi Bersani as secretary of the PD.

On 22 April 2013, Napolitano, after being re-elected for an unprecedented second term, immediately started consultations. Two days later, the President gave Letta the task of forming a government, having determined that Bersani could not. Letta succeeded Mario Monti, who had resigned on 21 December 2012 but whose government remained in charge for ordinary administration until 28 April 2013, the day the new government was sworn in. During the ceremony, a man fired shots outside Palazzo Chigi and wounded two Carabinieri. The cabinet was composed mainly by four parties: the PD, the PdL, SC, and the UdC. The fact that the new Prime Minister was a nephew of Gianni Letta, one of the most trusted advisors to Silvio Berlusconi, the leader of the PdL, was perceived as a way of overcoming the bitter hostility between the two opposing camps.

=== Fall of government ===
On 28 September, Berlusconi asked his party's five ministers to resign from the government over a tax hike. On 15 November 2013, Berlusconi, who would be soon stripped of his seat in the Senate with PD's votes due to his conviction for tax fraud, announced the re-foundation of Forza Italia (FI), in opposition to the government, and the PdL split. In fact, all five PdL ministers, led by Deputy Prime Minister and Minister of the Interior Angelino Alfano, joined the New Centre-Right (NCD) party. The same week, SC also suffered a split, with its minister Mario Mauro leaving the party, founding the Populars for Italy (PpI) and nevertheless keeping his post. The Letta government lasted until 22 February 2014 (for a total of 300 days). The government fell apart after the PD retired its support. Since December 2013, the party had been led by Matteo Renzi, the 39-year-old mayor of Florence nicknamed "the scrapper". Renzi succeeded Letta and formed the Renzi government.

== Investiture votes ==
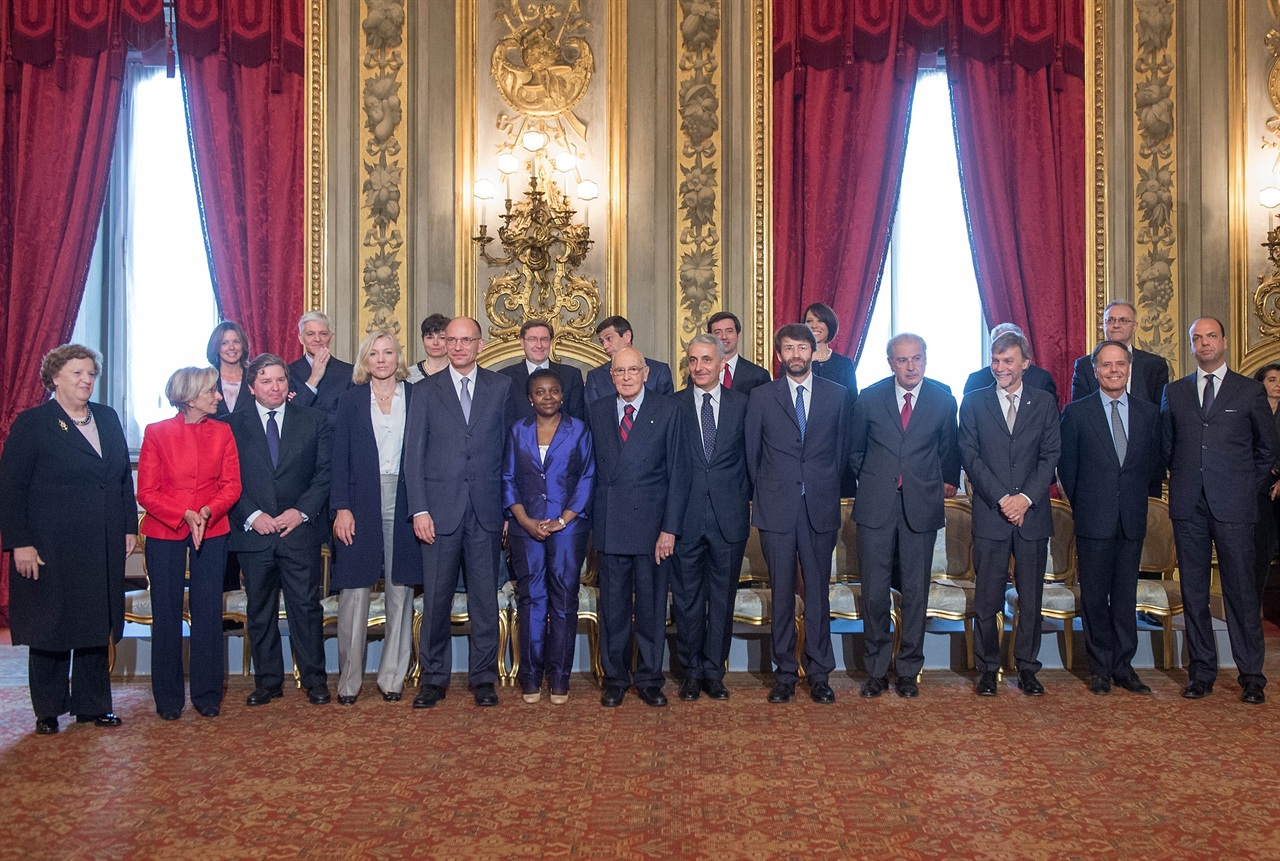
Letta's government during the oath

29–30 April 2013 Investiture votes for the Letta Cabinet
| House of Parliament | Vote | Parties | Votes |
|---|---|---|---|
| Chamber of Deputies (Voting: 623 (Note: Absent (6): CeI (2), PD (2), FdI (1), SI–SEL–P (1)) of 629, Majority: 304) | Yes | PD (291), FI (97), CeI (45), LN (2), Others (18) | 453 / 623 |
| Chamber of Deputies (Voting: 623 of 629, Majority: 304) | No | M5S (109), SEL (35), FdI (8), LN (1), Others (2) | 153 / 623 |
| Chamber of Deputies (Voting: 623 of 629, Majority: 304) | Abstention | LN (17) | 17 / 623 |
| Senate of the Republic (Voting: 310 (Note: Absent (4): FI (1), M5S (1), PD (1), Others (1) On institutional leave (4): FI (1), PD (1), Aut (1), Others (1) President (1)) of 319, Majority: 156) | Yes | PD (106), FI (89), CeI (21), Aut (9), GAL–UDC (8) | 233 / 310 |
| Senate of the Republic (Voting: 310 of 319, Majority: 156) | No | M5S (53), Others (6) | 59 / 310 |
| Senate of the Republic (Voting: 310 of 319, Majority: 156) | Abstention | LN (16), GAL–UDC (2) | 18 / 310 |

== Party breakdown ==
=== Beginning of term ===
==== Ministers ====
- Democratic Party
10
- The People of Freedom
5
- Independents
3
- Civic Choice
2
- Union of the Centre
1
- Italian Radicals
1

==== Ministers and other members ====
- Democratic Party (PD): Prime minister, 9 ministers, 5 deputy ministers, 12 undersecretaries
- The People of Freedom (PdL): 5 ministers, 2 deputy ministers, 10 undersecretaries
- Independents: 3 ministers, 2 deputy ministers, 5 undersecretaries
- Civic Choice (SC): 2 ministers, 1 deputy minister, 2 undersecretaries
- Union of the Centre (UdC): 1 minister, 1 undersecretary
- Italian Radicals (RI): 1 minister
- Great South (GS): 1 undersecretary
- Moderates in Revolution (MiR): 1 undersecretary

=== End of term ===
==== Ministers ====
- Democratic Party
9
- New Centre-Right
4
- Independents
3
- Civic Choice
1
- Union of the Centre
1
- Populars for Italy
1
- Italian Radicals
1

==== Ministers and other members ====
- Democratic Party (PD): Prime minister, 8 ministers, 4 deputy ministers, 12 undersecretaries
- New Centre-Right (NCD): 4 ministers, 1 deputy minister, 7 undersecretaries
- Independents: 3 ministers, 2 deputy ministers, 5 undersecretaries
- Civic Choice (SC): 1 minister, 1 deputy minister, 1 undersecretary
- Populars for Italy (PpI): 1 minister, 1 undersecretary
- Union of the Centre (UdC): 1 minister, 1 undersecretary
- Italian Radicals (RI): 1 minister

== Council of Ministers ==
| Cabinet | Name | Party | Term |
|---|---|---|---|
| Prime Minister | Enrico Letta | PD | 2013–2014 |
| Deputy Prime Minister | Angelino Alfano | PdL / NCD | 2013–2014 |
| Minister of Foreign Affairs | Emma Bonino | RI | 2013–2014 |
| Minister of the Interior | Angelino Alfano | PdL / NCD | 2013–2014 |
| Minister of Justice | Anna Maria Cancellieri | Independent | 2013–2014 |
| Minister of Defence | Mario Mauro | SC / PpI | 2013–2014 |
| Minister of Economy and Finance | Fabrizio Saccomanni | Independent | 2013–2014 |
| Minister of Economic Development | Flavio Zanonato | PD | 2013–2014 |
| Minister of Infrastructure and Transport | Maurizio Lupi | PdL / NCD | 2013–2014 |
| Minister of Agricultural, Food and Forestry Policies | Nunzia De Girolamo | PdL / NCD | 2013–2014 |
| Minister of Agricultural, Food and Forestry Policies | Enrico Letta (ad interim) | PD | 2014 |
| Minister of the Environment | Andrea Orlando | PD | 2013–2014 |
| Minister of Labour and Social Policies | Enrico Giovannini | Independent | 2013–2014 |
| Minister of Education, University and Research | Maria Chiara Carrozza | PD | 2013–2014 |
| Minister of Culture and Tourism | Massimo Bray | PD | 2013–2014 |
| Minister of Health | Beatrice Lorenzin | PdL / NCD | 2013–2014 |
| Minister of European Affairs | Enzo Moavero Milanesi | SC | 2013–2014 |
| Minister of Regional Affairs | Graziano Delrio | PD | 2013–2014 |
| Minister of Territorial Cohesion | Carlo Trigilia | PD | 2013–2014 |
| Minister for Parliamentary Relations | Dario Franceschini | PD | 2013–2014 |
| Minister for Integration | Cécile Kyenge | PD | 2013–2014 |
| Minister of Equal Opportunities, Sport and Youth Policies | Josefa Idem | PD | 2013 |
| Minister of Public Administration | Gianpiero D'Alia | UDC | 2013–2014 |
| Minister for Constitutional Reforms | Gaetano Quagliariello | PdL / NCD | 2013–2014 |
| Secretary of the Council of Ministers | Filippo Patroni Griffi | Independent | 2013–2014 |

== Composition ==
| Office | Portrait | Name | Term of office | Party |
|---|---|---|---|---|
| Prime Minister | | Enrico Letta | 28 April 2013 – 22 February 2014 | Democratic Party |
| Prime Minister | Undersecretaries: Giovanni Legnini (PD) – Delegated to Publishing and the Implementation of the Government Program; Marco Minniti (PD) – Delegated to the Authority for the Security of the Republic | | | |
| Deputy Prime Minister | | Angelino Alfano | 28 April 2013 – 22 February 2014 | The People of Freedom; Before 15 November 2013 |
| Deputy Prime Minister | | Angelino Alfano | 28 April 2013 – 22 February 2014 | New Centre-Right; After 15 November 2013 |
| Minister of Foreign Affairs | | Emma Bonino | 28 April 2013 – 22 February 2014 | Italian Radicals |
| Minister of Foreign Affairs | Deputy Ministers: Lapo Pistelli (PD); Marta Dassù (PD); Bruno Archi (PdL; after 16 November 2013: FI) (until 3 December 2013); Undersecretary: Mario Giro (SC; after 10 December 2013: PpI) | | | |
| Minister of the Interior | | Angelino Alfano | 28 April 2013 – 22 February 2014 | The People of Freedom; Before 15 November 2013 |
| Minister of the Interior | | Angelino Alfano | 28 April 2013 – 22 February 2014 | New Centre-Right; After 15 November 2013 |
| Minister of the Interior | Deputy Minister: Filippo Bubbico (PD); Undersecretaries: Domenico Manzione (Ind.); Gianpiero Bocci (PD) | | | |
| Minister of Justice | | Anna Maria Cancellieri | 28 April 2013 – 22 February 2014 | Independent |
| Minister of Justice | Undersecretaries: Giuseppe Berretta (PD); Cosimo Ferri (Ind.) | | | |
| Minister of Defence | | Mario Mauro | 28 April 2013 – 22 February 2014 | Civic Choice; Before 23 November 2013 |
| Minister of Defence | | Mario Mauro | 28 April 2013 – 22 February 2014 | Populars for Italy; After 23 November 2013 |
| Minister of Defence | Undersecretaries: Roberta Pinotti (PD); Gioacchino Alfano (PdL; after 16 November 2013: NCD) | | | |
| Minister of Economy and Finance | | Fabrizio Saccomanni | 28 April 2013 – 22 February 2014 | Independent |
| Minister of Economy and Finance | Deputy Ministers: Luigi Casero (PdL; after 16 November 2013: NCD); Stefano Fassina (PD) (until 4 January 2014); Undersecretaries: Pier Paolo Baretta (PD); Alberto Giorgetti (PdL; after 16 November 2013: NCD) | | | |
| Minister of Economic Development | | Flavio Zanonato | 28 April 2013 – 22 February 2014 | Democratic Party |
| Minister of Economic Development | Deputy Ministers: Carlo Calenda (SC); Antonio Catricalà (Ind.); Undersecretaries: Simona Vicari (PdL; after 16 November 2013: NCD); Claudio De Vincenti (PD) | | | |
| Minister of Agricultural, Food and Forestry Policies | | Nunzia De Girolamo | 28 April 2013 – 27 January 2014 | The People of Freedom; Before 15 November 2013 |
| Minister of Agricultural, Food and Forestry Policies | | Nunzia De Girolamo | 28 April 2013 – 27 January 2014 | New Centre-Right; After 15 November 2013 |
| Minister of Agricultural, Food and Forestry Policies | Enrico Letta (Acting) | | 27 January 2014 – 22 February 2014 | Democratic Party |
| Minister of Agricultural, Food and Forestry Policies | Undersecretaries: Maurizio Martina (PD); Giuseppe Castiglione (PdL; after 16 November 2013: NCD) | | | |
| Minister of the Environment | | Andrea Orlando | 28 April 2013 – 22 February 2014 | Democratic Party |
| Minister of the Environment | Undersecretary: Marco Flavio Cirillo (PdL; after 16 November 2013: FI) | | | |
| Minister of Infrastructure and Transport | | Maurizio Lupi | 28 April 2013 – 22 February 2014 | The People of Freedom; Before 15 November 2013 |
| Minister of Infrastructure and Transport | | Maurizio Lupi | 28 April 2013 – 22 February 2014 | New Centre-Right; After 15 November 2013 |
| Minister of Infrastructure and Transport | Deputy Minister: Vincenzo De Luca (PD); Undersecretaries: >Erasmo De Angelis (PD); Rocco Girlanda (PdL; after 16 November 2013: NCD) | | | |
| Minister of Labour and Social Policies | | Enrico Giovannini | 28 April 2013 – 22 February 2014 | Independent |
| Minister of Labour and Social Policies | Deputy Minister: Maria Cecilia Guerra (PD); Undersecretaries: Carlo Dell'Aringa (PD); Jole Santelli (PdL; after 16 November 2013: FI) (until 6 December 2013) | | | |
| Minister of Education, University and Research | | Maria Chiara Carrozza | 28 April 2013 – 22 February 2014 | Democratic Party |
| Minister of Education, University and Research | Undersecretaries: Gabriele Toccafondi (PdL; after 16 November 2013: NCD); Marco Rossi-Doria (Ind.); Gianluca Galletti (UDC) | | | |
| Minister of Cultural Heritage and Activities and Tourism | | Massimo Bray | 28 April 2013 – 22 February 2014 | Democratic Party |
| Minister of Cultural Heritage and Activities and Tourism | Undersecretaries: Simonetta Giordani (Ind.); Ilaria Borletti Buitoni (SC) | | | |
| Minister of Health | | Beatrice Lorenzin | 28 April 2013 – 22 February 2014 | The People of Freedom; Before 15 November 2013 |
| Minister of Health | | Beatrice Lorenzin | 28 April 2013 – 22 February 2014 | New Centre-Right; After 15 November 2013 |
| Minister of Health | Undersecretary: Paolo Fadda (PD) | | | |
| Minister for Parliamentary Relations and Coordination of Governmental Activity (without portfolio) | | Dario Franceschini | 28 April 2013 – 22 February 2014 | Democratic Party |
| Minister for Parliamentary Relations and Coordination of Governmental Activity (without portfolio) | Undersecretaries: Sesa Amici (PD); Sabrina De Camillis (PdL; after 16 November 2013: NCD) | | | |
| Minister of Public Administration (without portfolio) | | Gianpiero D'Alia | 28 April 2013 – 22 February 2014 | Union of the Centre |
| Minister of Public Administration (without portfolio) | Undersecretaries: Gianfranco Micciché (GS; after 16 November 2013: FI) (until 29 November 2013); Michaela Biancofiore (PdL) (until 1 October 2013) | | | |
| Minister of Regional Affairs and Autonomies (without portfolio) | | Graziano Delrio | 28 April 2013 – 22 February 2014 | Democratic Party |
| Minister of Regional Affairs and Autonomies (without portfolio) | Undersecretaries: Walter Ferrazza (MIR; after 16 November 2013: FI) (until 2 December 2013) | | | |
| Minister of European Affairs (without portfolio) | | Enzo Moavero Milanesi | 28 April 2013 – 22 February 2014 | Civic Choice |
| Minister of Regional Affairs and Territorial Cohesion (without portfolio) | | Carlo Trigilia | 28 April 2013 – 22 February 2014 | Democratic Party |
| Minister for Equal Opportunities, Sport and Youth Policies (without portfolio) | | Josefa Idem | 28 April 2013 – 22 February 2014 | Democratic Party |
| Minister for Integration (without portfolio) | | Cécile Kyenge | 28 April 2013 – 22 February 2014 | Democratic Party |
| Minister for Constitutional Reforms (without portfolio) | | Gaetano Quagliariello | 28 April 2013 – 22 February 2014 | The People of Freedom; Before 15 November 2013 |
| Minister for Constitutional Reforms (without portfolio) | | Gaetano Quagliariello | 28 April 2013 – 22 February 2014 | New Centre-Right; After 15 November 2013 |
| Secretary of the Council of Ministers | | Filippo Patroni Griffi | 28 April 2013 – 22 February 2014 | Independent |

== See also ==
- National unity government
- Technocratic government (Italy)
