= Luigi Nicolais =

Italian politician (1942–2026)

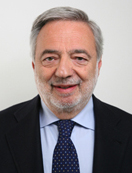

Minister for Reforms and Administrative Innovations
- In office 17 May 2006 – 8 May 2008
- Prime Minister: Romano Prodi
- Preceded by: Mario Baccini
- Succeeded by: Renato Brunetta

Member of the Chamber of Deputies
- In office 28 April 2008 – 23 February 2012
- Constituency: Campania 1

President of the National Research Council
- In office 18 February 2012 – 18 February 2016
- Preceded by: Francesco Profumo
- Succeeded by: Massimo Inguscio

Personal details
- Born: 9 February 1942 Sant'Anastasia, Italy
- Died: 12 January 2026 (aged 83) Naples, Italy
- Party: DS (1998–2007); PD (2007–2026)
- Education: University of Naples Federico II
- Profession: University professor, chemical engineer

Luigi Nicolais (9 February 1942 – 12 January 2026) was an Italian politician and academic, member of the Democratic Party and President of the National Research Council from 2012 to 2016.

== Life and career ==
=== Academic and research career ===
A chemical engineer, Nicolais graduated from the Faculty of Engineering of the University of Naples Federico II. Full professor of "Polymer Technologies" at the same University, as well as the author of over 350 scientific publications, he was Director of the Institute for Composite Materials Technology of the National Research Council. He was also a professor at the University of Washington and the University of Connecticut.

In 2012 he was appointed president of the National Research Council, replacing the new Minister of Education, University and Research of the Monti Cabinet Francesco Profumo and held the office for four years.

=== Political career ===
On 17 May 2006, Nicolais joined the second Prodi government as Minister for Reforms and Administrative Innovations and held the office for the whole 15th legislature.

A candidate in the 2008 political elections in the Campania 1 constituency among the Democratic Party lists, he was elected for a seat in the Chamber of Deputies. During the 16th legislature, Nicolais was a member and Vice-President of the 7th Commission for Culture, Science and Education of the Chamber of Deputies.

Formerly close to the positions of former President of Campania Antonio Bassolino, he was regional councilor with delegations to the University, scientific research and technological innovation to the Campania region from 2000 to 2005.

He was a candidate representing the centre-left coalition for the presidency of the province of Naples, but in the 2009 administrative elections he was beaten by the centre-right candidate Luigi Cesaro.

=== Death ===
Nicolais died in Naples on 12 January 2026, at the age of 83.
