= Roberto Calderoli =

Italian politician (born 1956)

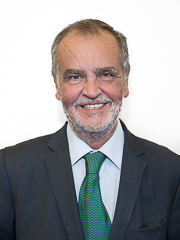

Minister of Regional Affairs and Autonomies
- Incumbent
- Assumed office 22 October 2022
- Prime Minister: Giorgia Meloni
- Preceded by: Mariastella Gelmini

Minister of Legislative Simplification
- In office 8 May 2008 – 16 November 2011
- Prime Minister: Silvio Berlusconi
- Succeeded by: Filippo Patroni Griffi

Member of the Senate of the Republic
- Incumbent
- Assumed office 30 May 2001
- Constituency: Lombardy (2001–06); Piedmont (2006–08); Lombardy (since 2008)

Member of the Chamber of Deputies
- In office 23 April 1992 – 29 May 2001
- Constituency: Lombardy

Vice President of the Senate of the Republic
- In office 21 March 2013 – 12 October 2022

Personal details
- Born: 18 April 1956 (age 70) Bergamo, Italy
- Party: Lega Nord; Lega per Salvini Premier
- Height: 1.78 m (5 ft 10 in)
- Profession: Maxillofacial surgeon

Roberto Calderoli (born 18 April 1956) is an Italian politician and a member of the Senate of the Republic. He was a Minister without portfolio for Legislative Simplification in the Berlusconi IV Cabinet. He previously served as Minister without portfolio for Reforms and Devolution in the Berlusconi II Cabinet (since 20 June 2004) and in the Berlusconi III Cabinet (until 18 February 2006, when he resigned following a controversy). A leading member of Lega Nord, he is regarded as representing the right wing of the political spectrum. He is serving as minister of Regional Affairs and Autonomies in the Meloni Cabinet since 2022.

Calderoli is often the centre of public controversies, usually because of racist, xenophobic, or offensive public remarks.In July 2013, Calderoli insulted Italy's first black Minister, Italo-Congolese Cécile Kyenge, saying: "Whenever I see Minister Kyenge, I cannot help but think of an orangutan."

== Career ==
A native of Bergamo and a dentist like many of his relatives, Calderoli started his political experience with the Lega Lombarda, a precursor of the federated Northern League, of which he was the president in 1993 and national secretary between 1995 and 2002.

Between 1990 and 1995, he sat in the town council in Bergamo, and since 2002 he has been the coordinator of the national secretariat of the Northern League. He was an MP in the Chamber of Deputies between 1992 and 2001, as a representative of the Northern League-Padania, and for a while he was president of the Commission for Social Affairs.

In the 2001 Italian general election, he was elected to the Senate of Italy in the first-past-the-post constituency of Albino. He then became the vice-president of the Senate until July 2004, when he was appointed Minister for Institutional Reforms in the place of Umberto Bossi, the longtime leader of the Northern League who had suffered a serious stroke and could not perform his duties. During his mandate, he also wrote a new electoral law based on proportional representation with a strong majority premium rather than plurality voting system, which was first introduced in Italy in 1994 by a referendum. Successively, Calderoli himself criticized the electoral law he wrote by defining it una porcata (literally, "a piggish stuff").

Calderoli is currently serving as secretary of Lega per Salvini Premier.

== New electoral law (2005) ==
A new electoral law was established in 2005 under Calderoli's rapporteurship, and then dubbed Calderoli Law, and it is a form of semi-proportional representation. A party presents its own closed list and it can join other parties in alliances. The coalition which receives a plurality automatically wins at least 26 seats. Respecting this condition, seats are divided between coalitions, and subsequently to party lists, using the largest remainder method with a Hare quota. To receive seats, a party must overcome the barrier of 8% of the vote if it contests a single race, or of 3% of the vote if it runs in alliance. The change in the electoral law was strongly requested by the Union of Christian and Centre Democrats, and finally agreed by Berlusconi, although criticised (including by political scientist Giovanni Sartori) for its comeback to proportionalism and its timing, less than one year before general elections. Calderoli himself defined the electoral law as a porcata – a pork affair.

== Cartoon crisis ==
During the international crisis sparked by the publishing of the Jyllands-Posten Muhammad cartoons, Calderoli made statements on 8 February 2006 that were favourable to usage of force against Muslims and asked for the intervention of Pope Benedict XVI to form a "coalition", referencing the battles of Lepanto and Vienna.

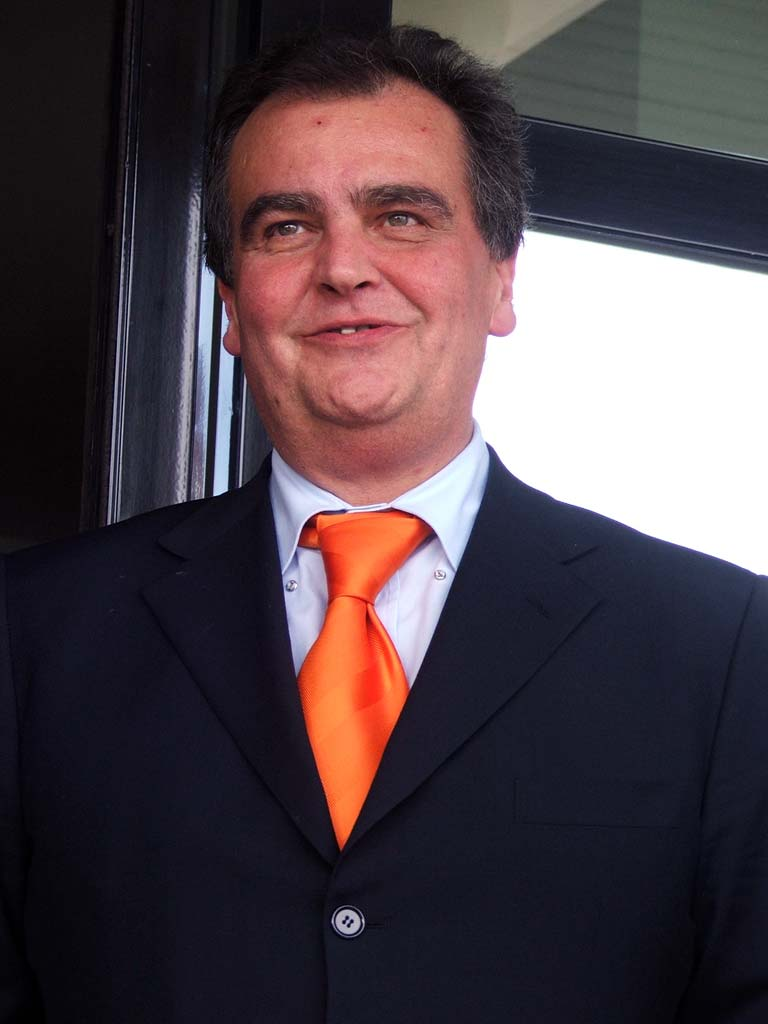
Calderoli in 2008

On 15 February 2006, he announced he would wear a T-shirt with the Muhammad cartoons. Later that evening, just after the news broadcast on state flagship television station Rai Uno, during a live interview he said: "I am wearing one of those T-shirts even now", and promptly unbuttoned his shirt, revealing a T-shirt with a caricature emblazoned on it. Though the press reported it to be one of the Jyllands-Posten cartoons, it was actually the cartoon published on France-Soir's front page in the 1 February 2006 issue, the very day the same newspaper published the Jyllands-Posten cartoons. Actually, Calderoli did not show one of the cartoons that caused the international crisis.

The event was widely published in Libya (a former colony of Italy), and about 1,000 people gathered for a protest and began throwing rocks and bottles toward the Italian consulate in Benghazi which they set ablaze. In clashes with the police, at least eleven people died and twenty-five were wounded.

Subsequently, Silvio Berlusconi asked Calderoli to resign because his act was against the government's political line; in an interview given to Italian newspaper La Repubblica, Calderoli declared that he would not resign. He eventually gave in to the massive pressure coming from all parties (and lack of support in his own), and resigned on 18 February 2006.

== Controversy ==
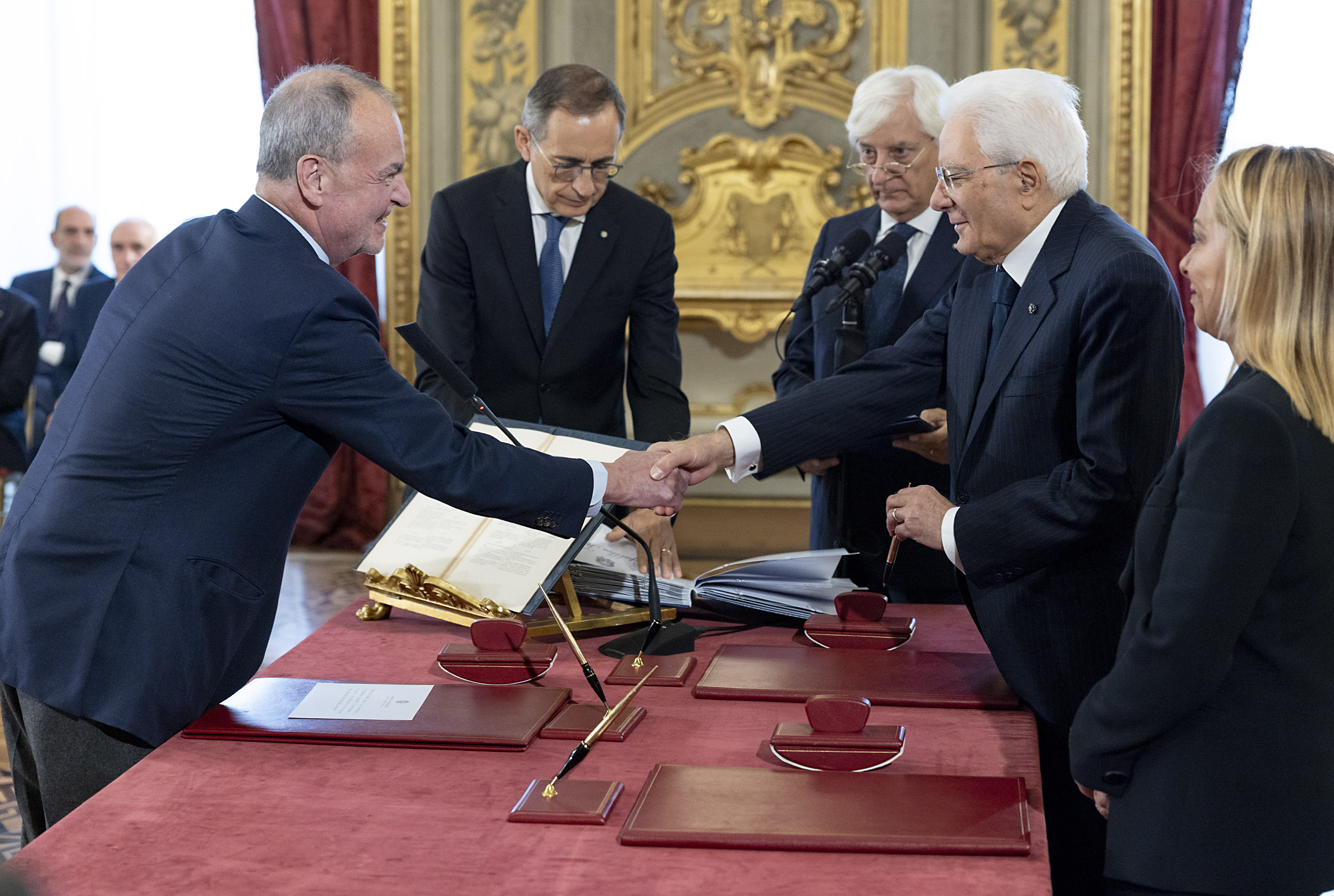
Roberto Calderoli, Minister without Portfolio, at the swearing-in ceremony of the government

Responding to criticism about a controversial electoral law that he penned in 2006, Calderoli affirmed: "I wrote [the law], but honestly it is a pig-sty."

Following Italy's win against France in the 2006 FIFA World Cup Final, Calderoli criticized France for having "sacrificed its identity for results by fielding negroes, Muslims and Communists". These comments drew many protests from the French embassy, the Italian Green Party who said that Calderoli is "no better than the Ku Klux Klan", and the Party of Italian Communists, among others. Moreover, Calderoli said the centre-left government "would very probably have supported this France with no identity and the headbutts of Zidane".

In June 2008 Calderoli said in a TV interview: "It is obvious that there are ethnic groups and populations that are more inclined to work and others not. And there is greater predisposition for crime by someone over others."

On 13 July 2013, Calderoli told a Lega Nord rally in Treviglio that Integration minister Cécile Kyenge, who was born in the Democratic Republic of the Congo but has Italian citizenship, would be better off working as a minister "in her country." According to the Corriere della Sera, which reported the event, he added: "I love animals – bears and wolves, as is known – but when I see the pictures of Kyenge I cannot but think of the features of an orangutan, even if I'm not saying she is one."

== Comments on the Swiss vote to ban minarets ==
In November 2009, after a national referendum resulted in the changing the Swiss Federal Constitution so that it prohibited the construction of minarets, Calderoli told Agenzia Nazionale Stampa Associata that Switzerland had sent a clear signal: "Yes to church towers, no to minarets." He further stated that he wished Switzerland would act as a model for Italy in this regard.

Political offices
Preceded by Umberto Bossi	Minister for Institutional Reforms; 2004–2006	Succeeded by Vannino Chiti
New title	Minister for Legislative Simplification; 2008–2011	Succeeded by Filippo Patroni Griffi
