= Minister for Integration =

Minister for Integration may refer to:

- Minister for Integration (Denmark)
- Minister for Integration (Italy)
- Minister for Integration (Sweden)
