= Antonio Catricalà =

Italian magistrate and politician (1952–2021)

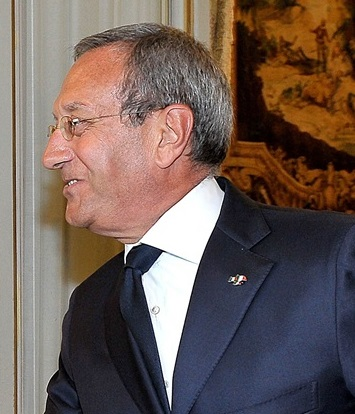

Secretary of the Council of Ministers
- In office 16 November 2011 – 28 April 2013
- Prime Minister: Mario Monti
- Preceded by: Gianni Letta
- Succeeded by: Filippo Patroni Griffi

Personal details
- Born: 7 February 1952 Catanzaro, Italy
- Died: 24 February 2021 (aged 69) Rome, Italy
- Party: Independent
- Spouse: Diana Agosti
- Children: 2
- Education: Sapienza University of Rome
- Profession: Politician, lawyer, magistrate, professor, civil servant

Antonio Catricalà (7 February 1952 – 24 February 2021) was an Italian public manager, politician, professor, lawyer, and magistrate.

== Biography ==
Catricalà graduated with honors in law from the University of Rome "La Sapienza". He passed the competitive examination for the ordinary judiciary and passed the qualifying exam as a lawyer. Subsequently, he became councilor and section president of the Italian Council of State. He also taught private law in the faculty of law of the University of Rome Tor Vergata.

He was president of the Italian Competition Authority from 9 March 2005 to 16 November 2011. On 18 November 2010, he was appointed chair of the Authority for electricity and gas, but he gave up the appointment a few days later to remain President of the Antitrust.

On 16 November 2011, he was appointed Undersecretary of State to the Presidency of the Council of Ministers acting as Council Secretary in the Monti Cabinet. On 2 May 2013, he was appointed Deputy Minister to the Ministry of Economic Development in the Letta Cabinet with responsibility for communications.

On 28 October 2014, Catricalà announced that he had resigned as Section President of the Council of State to pursue a career as a lawyer and founded the "Law Academy". Subsequently, he became a partner of "Studio Lipani Catricalà & Partners". On 30 June 2015 he was appointed president of the "Body for the management of the lists of financial agents and credit brokers" (Organismo per la gestione degli Elenchi degli Agenti in attività finanziaria e dei Mediatori creditizi). On 20 April 2017, he was appointed chairman of "Aeroporti di Roma SpA".

Catricalà used a revolver to commit suicide in his apartment in Rome, on 24 February 2021.
