= Renato Brunetta =

Italian economist and politician (born 1950)

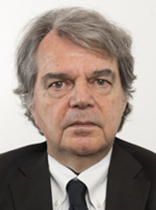

President of the CNEL
- Incumbent
- Assumed office 20 April 2023
- Preceded by: Tiziano Treu

Minister of Public Administration
- In office 13 February 2021 – 22 October 2022
- Prime Minister: Mario Draghi
- Preceded by: Fabiana Dadone
- Succeeded by: Paolo Zangrillo
- In office 8 May 2008 – 16 November 2011
- Prime Minister: Silvio Berlusconi
- Preceded by: Luigi Nicolais
- Succeeded by: Filippo Patroni Griffi

Member of the Chamber of Deputies
- In office 28 April 2008 – 12 October 2022
- Constituency: Veneto

Member of the European Parliament for North-East Italy
- In office 20 July 1999 – 28 April 2008

Personal details
- Born: 15 May 1950 (age 76) Venice, Italy
- Party: PSI (1983–1994); FI (1994–2009); PdL (2009–2013); FI (2013–2022)
- Spouse: Titti Giovannoni
- Education: University of Padua
- Profession: Economist; Politician

Renato Brunetta (born 26 May 1950) is an Italian economist and politician. He was the Minister of Public Administration and Innovation from 8 May 2008 to 16 November 2011 in the Berlusconi government. He was also the Minister for Public Administration in the Draghi government, from 13 February 2021 until 22 October 2022. He was the head of Forza Italia's deputies group at the Chamber of Deputies from 2013 to 2018.

== Early life and career ==
Renato Brunetta was born on 26 May 1950, in Venice, Italy, the youngest of three brothers. He grew up in a poor family and his father was a peddler. He attended the classical lyceum Foscarini. Brunetta once said that as a boy, he often studied classics on his own, to "reduce the social gap between him and his fellow students".

On 2 July 1973, he graduated in Political and Economic Sciences at the University of Padua. His academic career began at the same university shortly after graduation. Beginning as an Assistant Professor of Theory and Development Policy and Applied Economics, he went on to focus on Labour Policy in 1977. In 1982, he joined the Department of Economic and Social Analysis of the Territory at the Luav University of Venice where he performed the role of associate professor of Fundamentals of Economics.

From 1991 to 1999, he was associate professor of Labour Economics at University of Rome Tor Vergata, where he also held the position of Professor of Political Economy until 2009.

Since 1976, Brunetta has been enrolled as a freelance journalist in the Order of Journalists of Veneto. He is a columnist of Il Sole 24 Ore and Il Giornale. Moreover, he is the founder and editor of the magazine Labor – Reviews of Labor Economics and Industrial Relations, published by Wiley-Blackwell for the Center for Economic and International Studies (CEIS) of the Tor Vergata University.

Together with Vittorio Feltri, he wrote a series of Manuals of Political Conversation published by Libero. In June 2020, he briefly became a columnist for Il Riformista, a centrist and liberal newspaper directed by Piero Sansonetti, which he left in October 2020.

== Political activity ==
He is a former member of the Italian Socialist Party.

== Career ==
- He is a former professor of Labour Economics at the University of Rome Tor Vergata.
- In the 1980s and 1990s he was an economics adviser to the governments of Bettino Craxi, Giuliano Amato, and Carlo Azeglio Ciampi.
- From 1985 to 1989, he was the vice-chairman of the Labour and Social Affairs Committee of the Organisation for Economic Co-operation and Development (in Paris).
- From 1983 to 1987 he was an official of the Ministry of Labour with overall responsibility for employment strategy and incomes policy.
- In 1989 he founded the European Association of Labour Economists, of which he is the first chairman.
- From 1999 to 2008 he was a member of the European Parliament.
- He is the founder and editor of the journal Labour - Review of Labour Economics and Industrial Relations. He has also written for the newspapers Il Sole 24 Ore, Il Giornale, and Avanti!.

== See also ==
- 1999 European Parliament election in Italy
- 2004 European Parliament election in Italy

== Notes ==
Political offices
Preceded by Luigi Nicolais	Italian Minister of Public Administration and Innovation; 2008 – 2011	Succeeded by Filippo Patroni Griffi
Preceded by Fabiana Dadone	Italian Minister of Public Administration; 2021 – 2022	Succeeded by Gilberto Pichetto Fratin
