= Maria Cecilia Guerra =

Italian politician and economist (born 1957)

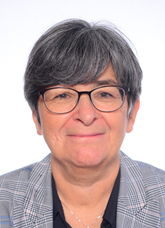
- Born: 6 December 1957 (age 68); Nanantola, Italy
- Occupations: academic, politician
- Political party: Democratic Party (Italy)

Maria Cecilia Guerra (born 6 December 1957 in Nonantola) is an Italian economist and politician.

She served as the Undersecretary of the Ministry of Labor and Social Policies in the Monti government and as the Deputy Minister of the same ministry, with responsibility for Equal Opportunities, in the Letta government. From 16 September 2019 to 22 October 2022 she served as the Undersecretary of the Ministry of Economy and Finance in the Conte II and Draghi governments.

== Biography ==
After obtaining a degree in Economics and Commerce in 1981 from the University of Modena, Guerra earned a Master of Philosophy in Economics from the University of Cambridge in 1983, with recognition for admission to the second year of the Ph.D. program at the same university. From 1983 to 1987, she pursued her Ph.D. in Political Economics established by the consortium of the Universities of Bologna, Modena, Padua, and Venice.

== Career ==
=== Academic career ===
Her professional experience began in 1986 as a researcher in Political Economics, specializing in Public Finance, at the University of Brescia. From 1990 to 1995, she held a contract professor position at the Luigi Bocconi Commercial University. In 1992, she joined the Faculty of Economics at the University of Modena as an associate professor of Public Finance, and in 2000, she became a full professor in the same field.

Guerra participated in working groups and committees established by the Ministry of Finance from 1989 to 1999, focusing on the taxation of capital income and companies. In 2006, she chaired the commission on the taxation of capital and various financial incomes, established by the Ministry of Economy and Finance. From 2007 to 2008, she served as a member of the advisory and study commission on the tax treatment of family incomes and family allowances, established by the Higher School of Economics and Finance upon the recommendation of the Vice Minister of Economy and Finance, Visco.

She is a member of the CAPP (Center for Analysis of Public Policies) and CEFIN (Study Center for Banking and Finance). She is part of the editorial board of lavoce.info, the management board of the journal Politica Economica published by Il Mulino, and the scientific committee of the Rivista delle politiche sociali published by Ediesse.

She has also held non-academic positions, such as a member of the Management Committee of the Revenue Agency, a member of the board of directors and Internal Control Committee of Meta S.p.A., a member of the Board of Directors of Hera Modena S.r.l., and a political commitments.

=== Political career ===
On 28 November 2011 Guerra joined the Monti government as the Undersecretary of the Ministry of Labor and Social Policies. She took the oath the following day. At the time of her appointment, she was a member of the scientific committee "Standard Needs" at the scientific directorate of Ifel (Institute for Finance and Local Economy) and the regional observatory for the implementation of fiscal federalism in Emilia-Romagna (ORAFF-ER).

In the 2013 general elections, she was elected to the Senate of the Republic on the Democratic Party's list in the Emilia-Romagna constituency.

On 2 May 2013 she was confirmed in her role as Undersecretary in the new Letta government. On 19 June 2013 the Council of Ministers approved the delegation of functions proposed by Minister Enrico Giovannini to grant her the title of Deputy Minister. On 26 June 2013, following the resignation of Minister Josefa Idem, she was assigned the responsibility for Equal Opportunities.

After leaving the Democratic Party, she became the group leader of MDP on 28 February 2017. In the 2018 general elections, she ran for the Chamber of Deputies with Liberi e Uguali in the single-member constituency of Modena but was not elected. After her unsuccessful re-election, she returned to teaching Public Finance at the Faculty of Economics at the University of Modena.

She ran in the 2019 European Parliament elections on the PD-Siamo Europei-PSE list in the North-East constituency. She was one of the representatives of Article One in the lists. With 28,753 preference votes, she ranked eleventh but was not elected.

On 13 September 2019 she joined the second Conte government as the Undersecretary of the Ministry of Economy and Finance.

In the early elections held on 25 September 2022 she was a candidate for the Chamber of Deputies in the multi-member constituency of Piemonte 1 - 01, ranking third on the list of the Democratic Party – Italia Democratica e Progressista and was elected. On 14 October 2022 her party nominated her as a candidate in the election for the Presidency of the Chamber of Deputies, but she was not elected.

In April 2023, she became a member of the new secretariat of the Democratic Party led by Elly Schlein, with responsibility for labor policies. In June 2023, Articolo Uno dissolved and officially merged into the Democratic Party.
