= Minister for Public Administration (Italy) =

Ministry in the Cabinet of Italy

- Ministro per la Pubblica Amministrazione

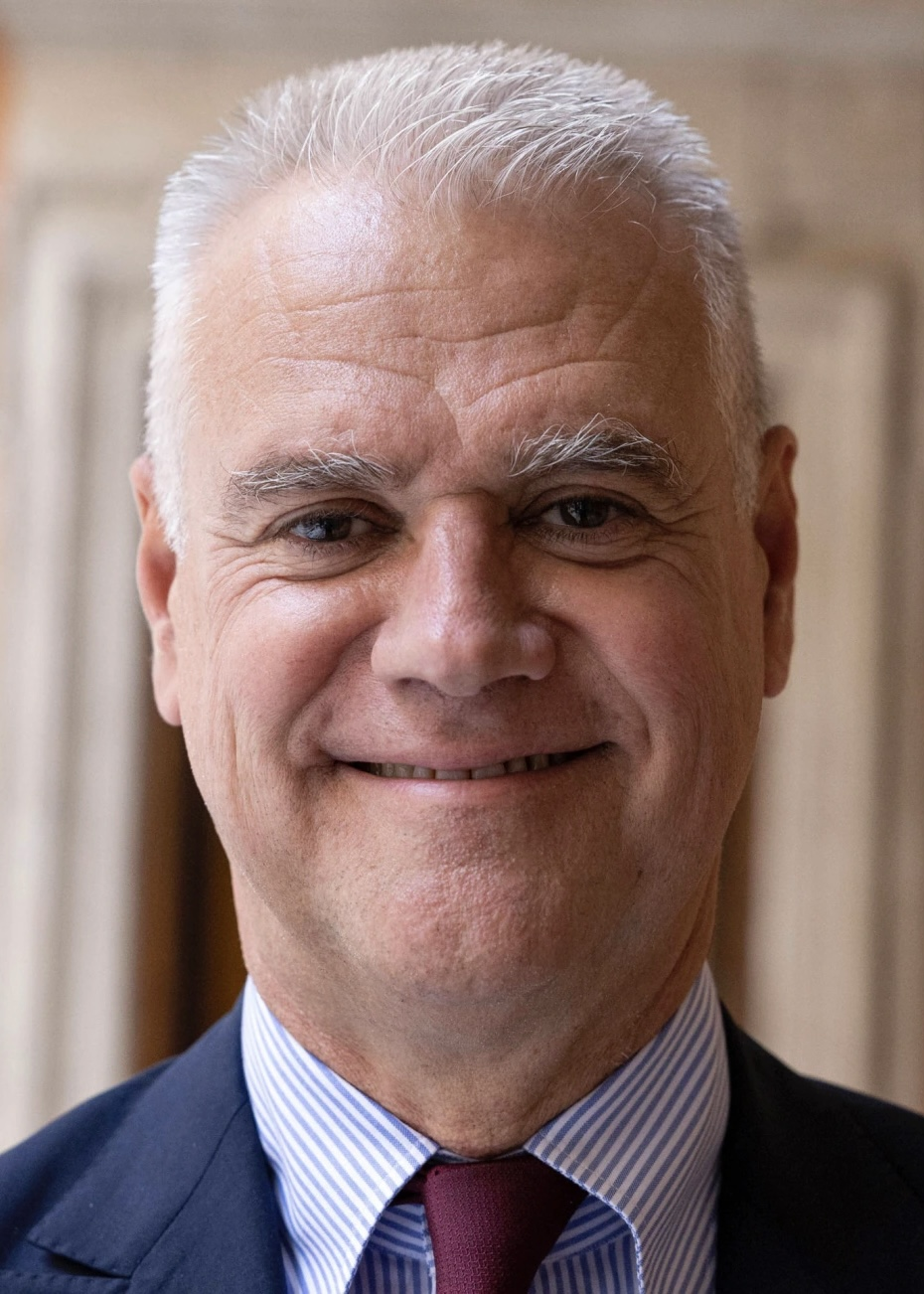
- Incumbent; Paolo Zangrillo since October 22, 2022
- Department of Public Function
- Member of: Council of Ministers
- Seat: Rome
- Appointer: The president of Italy
- Term length: No fixed term
- Formation: January 27, 1950; 76 years ago
- First holder: Raffaele Pio Petrilli
- Website: www.funzionepubblica.gov.it

The minister of public administration (Italian: ministro per la pubblica amministrazione) in Italy is one of the positions in the Italian government.

The current minister for public administration is Paolo Zangrillo, of Forza Italia, who held the office since 22 October 2022 in the government of Giorgia Meloni.

== List of ministers ==
Parties:

- 1946–1994:
  - Christian Democracy
  - Italian Democratic Socialist Party
  - Independent
- 1994–present:
  - Forza Italia / The People of Freedom
  - Democratic Party of the Left / Democrats of the Left
  - Italian Democratic Socialists
  - Union of Christian and Centre Democrats / Union of the Centre
  - Democratic Party
  - Northern League / League
  - Five Star Movement

Coalitions:

- 1946–1994:
  - Centrist coalition
  - Organic centre-left
  - Pentapartito / Quadripartito
  - Mixed coalition
- 1994–present:
  - Centre-right coalition
  - Centre-left coalition
  - Mixed coalition

Portrait	Name (Born–Died)	Term of office			Party	Government	Ref.
Portrait	Name (Born–Died)	Took office	Left office	Time in office	Party	Government	Ref.
Minister for the Bureaucratic Reform
	Raffaele Pio Petrilli (1892–1971)	27 January 1950	26 July 1951	1 year, 180 days	Christian Democracy	De Gasperi VI	
Office not in use		1951–1953				De Gasperi VII·VIII	
	Salvatore Scoca (1894–1962)	17 August 1953	18 January 1954	154 days	Christian Democracy	Pella	
Minister for the Administrative Reform
	Umberto Tupini (1889–1973)	18 January 1954	6 July 1955	1 year, 169 days	Christian Democracy	Fanfani I Scelba	
Minister for the Administrative Reform and Constitution
	Guido Gonella (1905–1982)	6 July 1955	19 May 1957	1 year, 317 days	Christian Democracy	Segni I	
Minister for the Administrative Reform
	Mario Zotta (1904–1963)	19 May 1957	1 July 1958	1 year, 43 days	Christian Democracy	Zoli	
	Camillo Giardina (1907–1985)	1 July 1958	16 February 1959	230 days	Christian Democracy	Fanfani II	
	Giorgio Bo (1905–1980)	16 February 1959	11 April 1960	1 year, 55 days	Christian Democracy	Segni II; Tambroni	
	Armando Angelini (1891–1968)	11 April 1960	26 July 1960	106 days	Christian Democracy	Tambroni	
	Tiziano Tessitori (1895–1973)	26 July 1960	21 February 1962	1 year, 210 days	Christian Democracy	Fanfani III	
	Giuseppe Medici (1907–2000)	21 February 1962	21 June 1963	1 year, 120 days	Christian Democracy	Fanfani IV	
	Roberto Lucifredi (1909–1981)	21 June 1963	4 December 1963	166 days	Christian Democracy	Leone I	
	Luigi Preti (1914–2009)	4 December 1963	23 February 1966	2 years, 81 days	Italian Democratic Socialist Party	Moro I·II	
	Virginio Bertinelli (1901–1973)	23 February 1966	24 June 1968	2 years, 122 days	Italian Democratic Socialist Party	Moro III	
	Tiziano Tessitori (1895–1973)	24 June 1968	12 December 1968	171 days	Christian Democracy	Leone II	
	Eugenio Gatto (1911–1981)	12 December 1968	27 March 1970	1 year, 105 days	Christian Democracy	Rumor I	
	Eugenio Gatto (1911–1981)	12 December 1968	27 March 1970	1 year, 105 days	Christian Democracy	Rumor II	
	Remo Gaspari (1921–2011)	27 March 1970	26 June 1972	2 years, 91 days	Christian Democracy	Rumor III; Colombo	
	Remo Gaspari (1921–2011)	27 March 1970	26 June 1972	2 years, 91 days	Christian Democracy	Andreotti I	
	Silvio Gava (1901–1999)	26 June 1972	14 March 1974	1 year, 261 days	Christian Democracy	Andreotti II	
	Silvio Gava (1901–1999)	26 June 1972	14 March 1974	1 year, 261 days	Christian Democracy	Rumor IV	
Minister for Public Administration and Regions
	Luigi Gui (1914–2010)	14 March 1974	23 November 1974	254 days	Christian Democracy	Rumor V	
	Francesco Cossiga (1928–2010)	23 November 1974	12 February 1976	1 year, 81 days	Christian Democracy	Moro IV	
	Tommaso Morlino (1925–1983)	12 February 1976	30 July 1976	169 days	Christian Democracy	Moro V	
Office not in use		1976–1979				Andreotti III·IV·V	
	Massimo Severo Giannini (1915–2000)	4 August 1979	18 October 1980	1 year, 75 days	Independent	Cossiga I	
	Massimo Severo Giannini (1915–2000)	4 August 1979	18 October 1980	1 year, 75 days	Independent	Cossiga II	
	Clelio Darida (1927–2017)	18 October 1980	28 June 1981	253 days	Christian Democracy	Forlani	
	Dante Schietroma (1917–2004)	28 June 1981	4 August 1983	2 years, 37 days	Italian Democratic Socialist Party	Spadolini I·II; Fanfani V	
Minister of Public Function
	Remo Gaspari (1921–2011)	4 August 1983	18 April 1987	3 years, 257 days	Christian Democracy	Craxi I·II	
Minister for Public Administration and Regions
	Livio Paladin (1933–2000)	18 April 1987	29 July 1987	102 days	Independent	Fanfani VI	
Ministers of Public Function
	Giorgio Santuz (1936– )	29 July 1987	13 April 1988	260 days	Christian Democracy	Goria	
	Paolo Cirino Pomicino (1939–2026)	13 April 1988	22 July 1989	1 year, 100 days	Christian Democracy	De Mita	
	Remo Gaspari (1921–2011)	22 July 1989	28 June 1992	2 years, 342 days	Christian Democracy	Andreotti VI·VII	
Office not in use		1992–1993				Amato I	
	Sabino Cassese (1935– )	28 April 1993	10 May 1994	1 year, 12 days	Independent	Ciampi	
Minister of Public Function and Regional Affairs
	Giuliano Urbani (1937– )	10 May 1994	17 January 1995	252 days	Forza Italia	Berlusconi I	
	Franco Frattini (1957–2022)	17 January 1995	22 March 1996	1 year, 65 days	Independent	Dini	
	Giovanni Motzo (1930–2002)	23 March 1996	17 May 1996	55 days	Independent	Dini	
	Franco Bassanini (1940– )	17 May 1996	21 October 1998	2 years, 157 days	Democratic Party of the Left	Prodi I	
Minister of Public Function
	Angelo Piazza (1955– )	21 October 1998	22 December 1999	1 year, 62 days	Italian Democratic Socialists	D'Alema I	
	Franco Bassanini (1940– )	22 December 1999	11 June 2001	1 year, 171 days	Democrats of the Left	D'Alema II; Amato II	
	Franco Frattini (1957–2022)	11 June 2001	14 November 2002	1 year, 166 days	Forza Italia	Berlusconi II	
	Luigi Mazzella (1932–)	14 November 2002	2 December 2004	2 years, 18 days	Independent	Berlusconi II	
	Mario Baccini (1957– )	2 December 2004	17 May 2006	1 year, 166 days	Union of Christian and Centre Democrats	Berlusconi II·III	
Minister for Reforms and Administrative Innovations
	Luigi Nicolais (1942–2026)	17 May 2006	8 May 2008	1 year, 357 days	Democrats of the Left / Democratic Party	Prodi II	
Minister for Public Administration and Innovation
	Renato Brunetta (1950– )	8 May 2008	16 November 2011	3 years, 192 days	The People of Freedom	Berlusconi IV	
Minister for Public Administration and Simplification
	Filippo Patroni Griffi (1955– )	16 November 2011	28 April 2013	1 year, 163 days	Independent	Monti	
	Gianpiero D'Alia (1966– )	28 April 2013	22 February 2014	300 days	Union of the Centre	Letta	
Minister of Simplification and Public Administration
	Marianna Madia (1980– )	22 February 2014	1 June 2018	4 years, 99 days	Democratic Party	Renzi; Gentiloni	
Minister for Public Administration
	Giulia Bongiorno (1966– )	1 June 2018	5 September 2019	1 year, 96 days	League	Conte I	
	Fabiana Dadone (1984– )	5 September 2019	13 February 2021	1 year, 161 days	Five Star Movement	Conte II	
	Renato Brunetta (1950– )	13 February 2021	22 October 2022	1 year, 251 days	Forza Italia / Independent	Draghi	
	Paolo Zangrillo (1961– )	22 October 2022	Incumbent	3 years, 320 days	Forza Italia	Meloni	
