= Paolo Zangrillo =

Italian politician

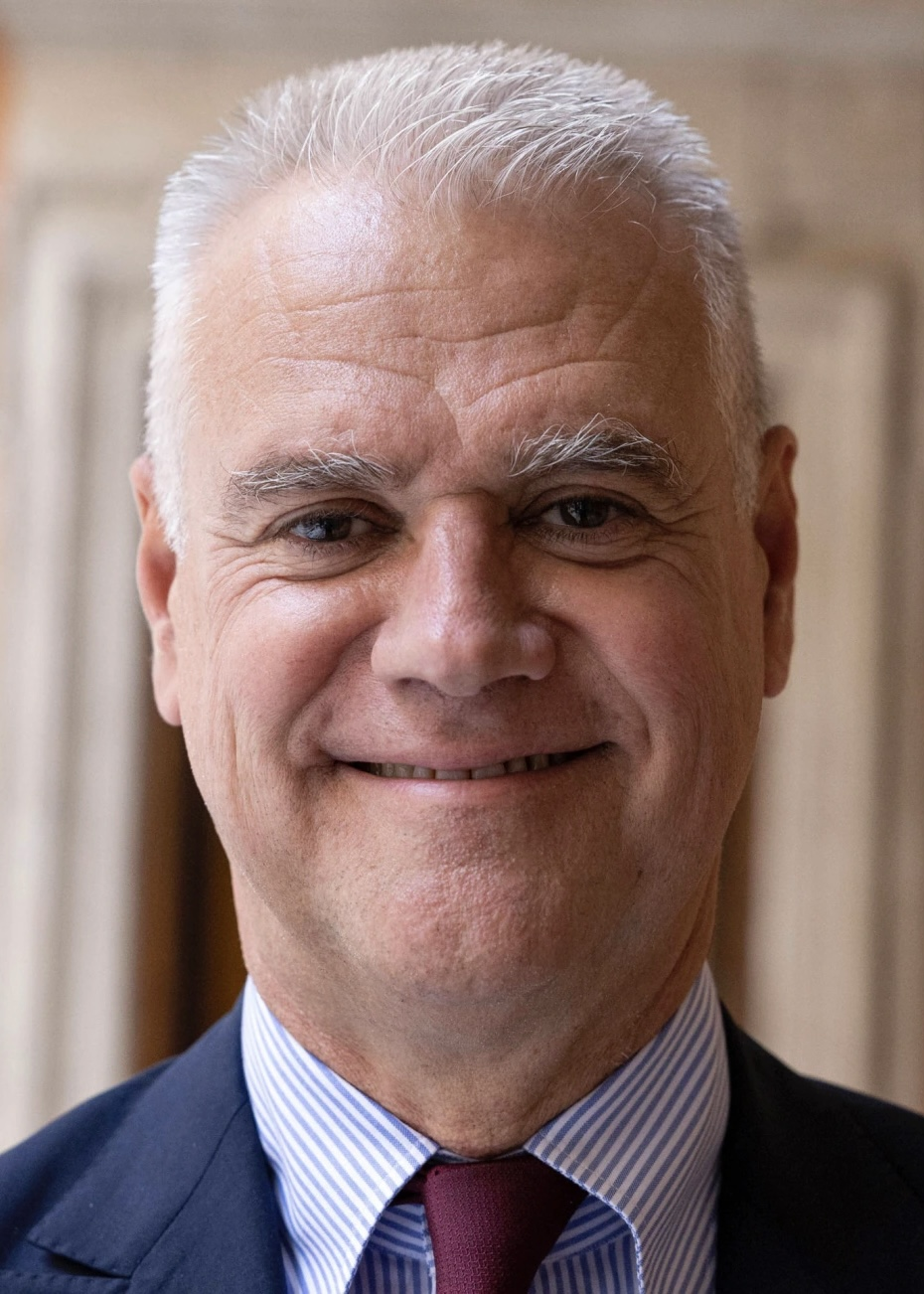
- Zangrillo in 2022

Minister for Public Administration
- Incumbent
- Assumed office 22 October 2022
- Prime Minister: Giorgia Meloni
- Preceded by: Renato Brunetta

Member of the Senate
- Incumbent
- Assumed office 13 October 2022
- Constituency: Alessandria

Member of the Chamber of Deputies
- In office 23 March 2018 – 12 October 2022
- Constituency: Piedmont 1

Personal details
- Born: 3 December 1961 (age 64) Genoa, Italy
- Party: Forza Italia
- Education: University of Milan
- Profession: Manager

Paolo Zangrillo (Genoa, born 3 December 1961) is an Italian politician and business executive, and the Minister for Public Administration in the Meloni government since 22 October 2022.

== Biography ==
Born in Genoa in 1961, he graduated in law from the University of Milan in 1987. Paolo Zangrillo is the younger brother of Alberto Zangrillo, head of the General Anesthesia and Resuscitation Unit of the San Raffaele Hospital in Milan and president of the Genoa and Silvio Berlusconi's personal doctor.

=== Managerial career ===
He began his career as a manager in 1992 at Magneti Marelli, maintaining his position until 2005, first as head of personnel in Europe and in the world and later as head of industrial relations and human resources. He then holds the position of vice-president for human resources at Fiat Powertrain Technologies until 2010 and at Iveco until 2011.

From 2011 to 2017, he held the role of personnel and organization director at Acea in Rome.

=== Political career ===
In January 2018 he was officially nominated by Forza Italia for the Chamber of Deputies in the general elections of that year, presenting himself in the Piedmont 1 – 01 plurinominal college and being among the elected members. During the XVIII legislature of the Republic he was a member of the 11th Public and Private Labor Commission, where he also dealt with citizens' income.

On 18 October 2018 he was appointed as the new regional commissioner of Forza Italia in Piedmont and Aosta Valley, replacing his party colleague and senator Gilberto Pichetto Fratin. On 24 December 2019 the regional councilor Emily Rini was chosen as the new coordinator of Forza Italia in the Aosta Valley, and therefore Zangrillo retains the position only for Piedmont.

==== Minister for Public Administration ====
In the early general elections of 2022, Zangrillo was a candidate for the Senate of the Republic in the uninominal college of Alessandria, for the center-right coalition in the Forza Italia, where he was elected senator with 50.83% of the votes, just under double compared to the candidates of the center-left, Democratic Party, Maria Rita Rossa (25.64%) and the Susy Matrisciano 5 Star Movement (9.57%).

On 22 October 2022 Zangrillo took the oath before the President of the Republic Sergio Mattarella and became Minister of Public Administration in the Meloni government.

== Political positions ==
He said he was in favor of smart working in the public administration, saying he was more open than the previous Minister of Public Administration Renato Brunetta, to the Turin-Lyon TAV project numerous times, participating in the Madamine demonstration in Piazza Castello in November 2018, and also invoking the "hard fist" of the Turin judiciary against groups of No TAV demonstrators, and a strong critic of citizens' income.
