= European Policy Centre =

Belgian think tank

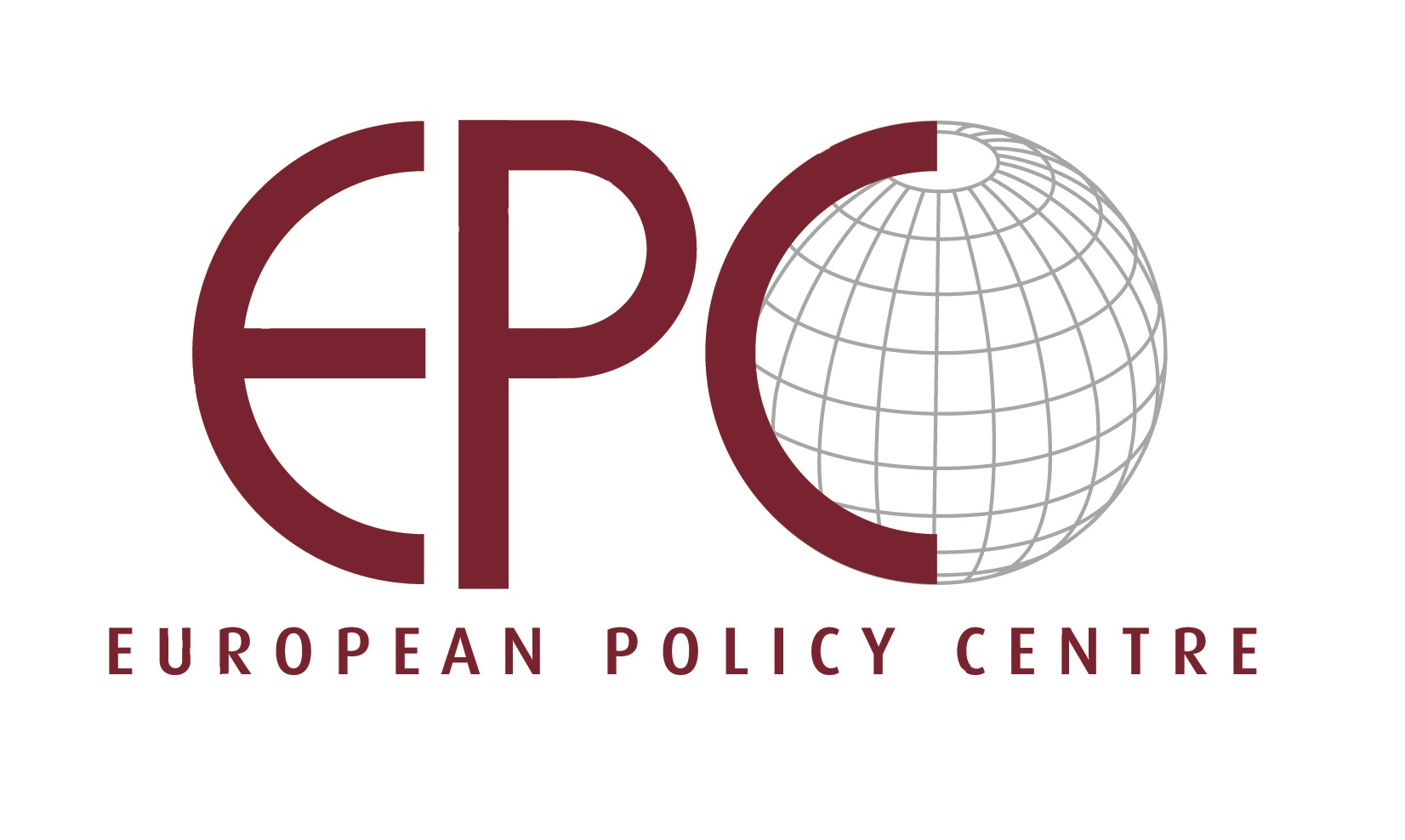
EPC logo

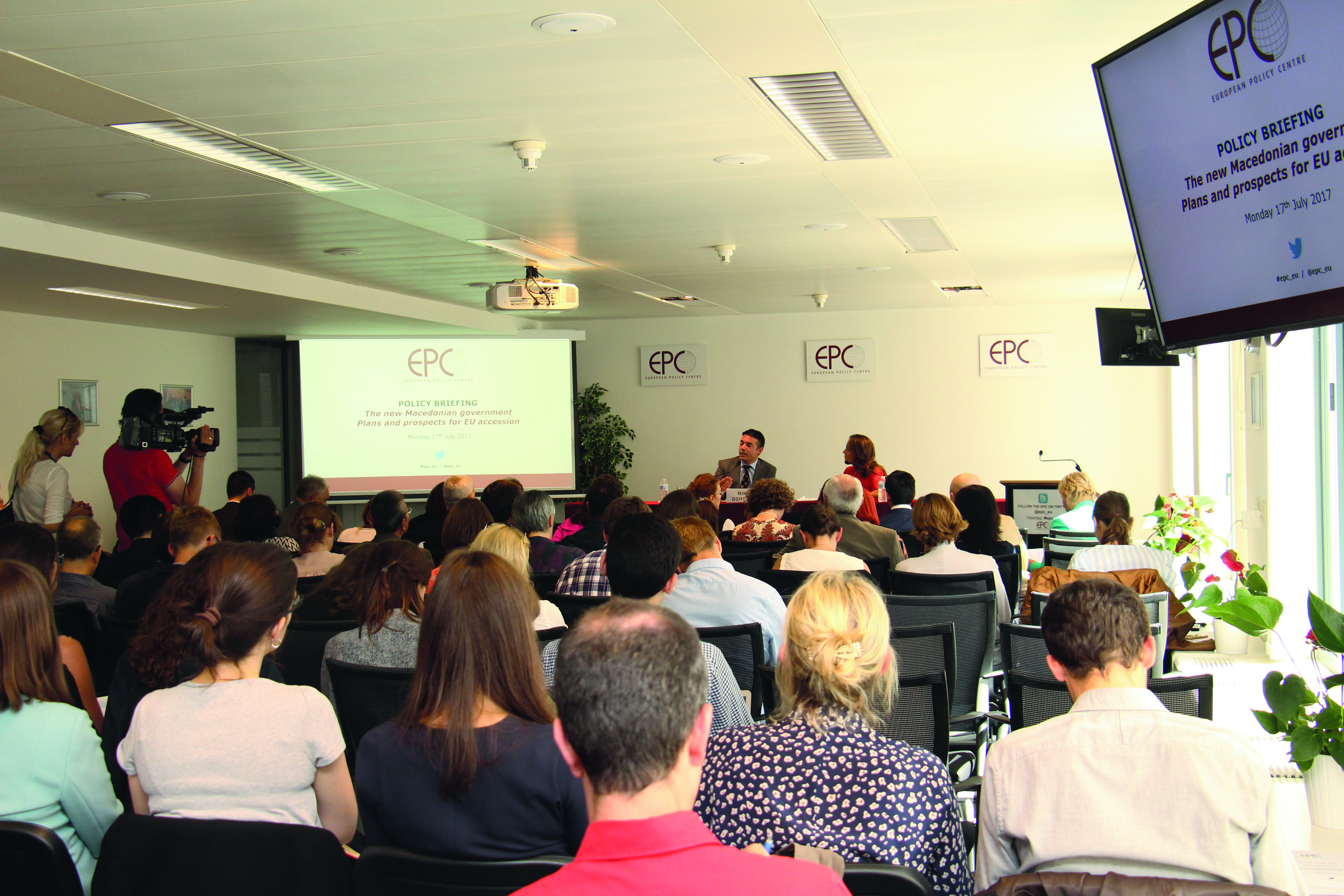
EPC conference centre

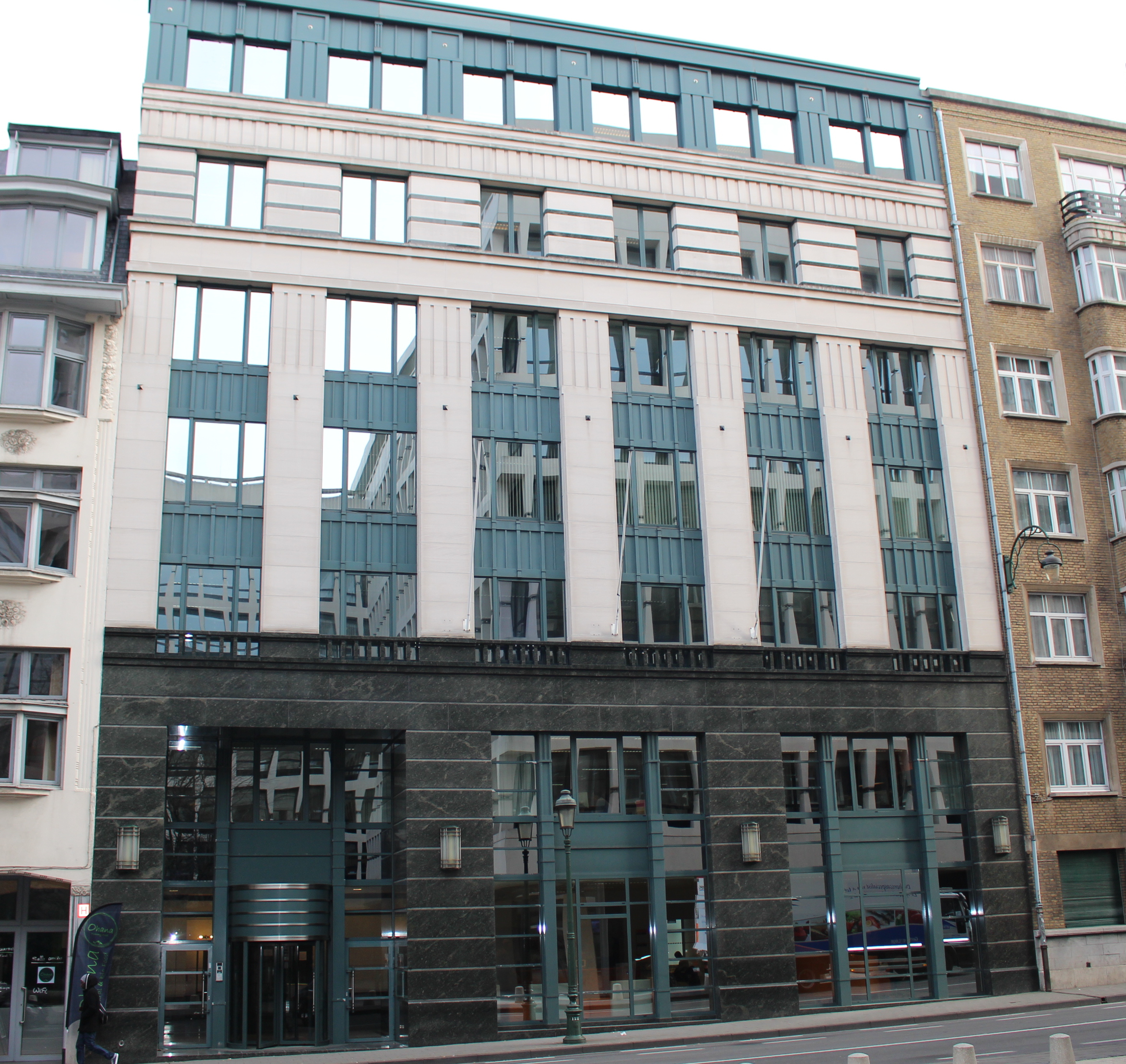
The premises of the European Policy Centre on Rue du Trône 14–16 in Brussels, Belgium

The European Policy Centre (EPC) is a think tank working on Europe Union and global affairs. It was founded in 1997.

== Governance ==
The EPC's funding comes from a number of sources, including its strategic partners: the King Baudouin Foundation, based in Belgium and Stiftung Mercator, based in Germany, and the European Union 's CERV Programme. It also comes from membership fees, and grants from the EU and other organisations. The EPC's total income in 2024 was 5 737 164 €.

The EPC is one of many Brussels-based think tanks funded partly through the European Commission’s CERV programme. According to a 2025 report by MCC Brussels, EPC received nearly €5.5 million in direct EU funding over the past decade and participated in projects worth nearly €30 million supported by EU grants. Conservative and euroskeptic critics have argued that such funding creates a perception of ideological alignment between the EPC and EU institutions, raising questions about the independence of EU-funded think tanks.

== Membership ==
The EPC has a membership of around 350 organisations, which include the following companies and organisations: Astra Zeneca, Jeronimo Martins, Danish Agricultural Council, Turkish Industry & Business Association, Mission of the Kingdom of Morocco to the European Communities, Mission of the People's Republic of China to the European Communities, the Taipei Representative Office in the EU and Belgium, the Open Society European Policy Institute, and the Wilfried Martens Centre for European Studies.

== Governance ==
Brigid Laffan is President of the European Policy Centre and chairs its Strategic Council, which includes Jean-Claude Juncker, Joaquin Almunia, Maria Joào Rodrigues, Lord Kerr of Kinlochard, Janez Potočnik, André Sapir, Wolfgang Schüssel, Marta Dassù, Catherine Day, Monica Frassoni, and Nathalie Tocci among others.

The EPC's General Assembly and Governing Board are chaired by Declan Kelleher, Former Irish Ambassador to the EU and to China.

Former Presidents of the European Policy Centre include Herman Van Rompuy, Peter Sutherland (1998–2011) and Philippe Maystadt (2011–2014). Former Chairs of the Governing Board include David O'Sullivan, former EU Ambassador to the US, Hywel Ceri Jones, founder of the Erasmus Programme; António Vitorino, former European Commissioner; and Meglena Kuneva, former European Commissioner.

== Funding ==
The EPC is funded through several sources, including its strategic partners: the King Baudouin Foundation, based in Belgium and Stiftung Mercator, based in Germany. The over 300 EPC members also pay annual fees, with amounts according to the type of membership. In addition, other foundations, corporations and the European Commission provide grants or fund specific events and publications.

== Tobacco companies ==
In the 1990s and 2000s, the European Policy Centre (EPC) was linked to lobbying activities carried out on behalf of the tobacco industry, particularly British American Tobacco (BAT) and Philip Morris International (PMI). Research based on internal tobacco industry documents suggests that the EPC played a role in the development of the European Union's "Better Regulation" agenda, which critics argue prioritises business interests over public health, social, and environmental concerns. Specifically, EPC helped tobacco companies, as well as other industry groups, lobby "to ensure that the EU framework for evaluating policy options emphasised business interests at the expense of public health".

The campaign ultimately succeeded, with all new EU public policies now subject to mandatory impact assessment. Although officially covering economic, social, and environmental impacts, researchers suggest that economic effects often receive the most weight, in line with the original objectives of BAT and allied corporations.

Hiding tobacco industry involvement. Studies have argued that the EPC's involvement helped obscure the role of tobacco companies in promoting these regulatory changes, by creating a broader coalition of corporate supporters. Interviews with European Commission officials at the time revealed little awareness of tobacco industry participation in the campaign, supporting claims that lobbying networks deliberately concealed the sector's role.

Following the public release of these findings, EPC's then–Chief Executive Hans Martens stated that BAT was merely a member of the Centre and "not very active," stressing that the company received no special favours compared to other members.
