= Monti government =

61st government of the Italian Republic

- 61st Cabinet of Italy

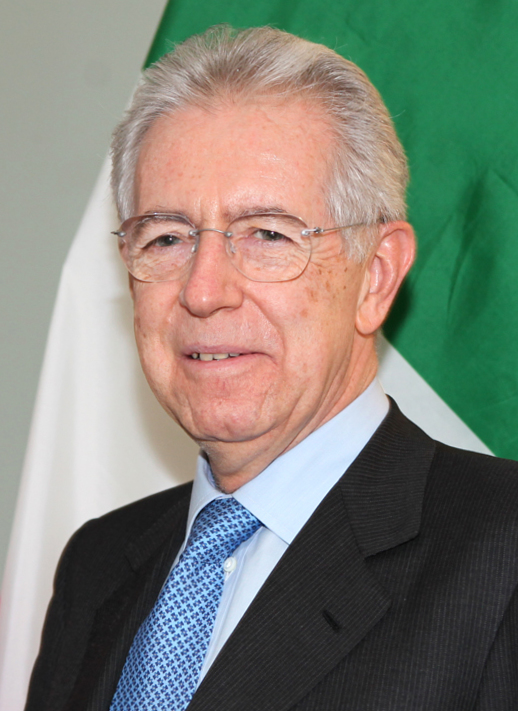
- Date formed: 16 November 2011
- Date dissolved: 28 April 2013 (530 days)

People and organisations
- Head of state: Giorgio Napolitano
- Head of government: Mario Monti
- No. of ministers: 18 (incl. Prime Minister)
- Ministers removed: 1 resigned
- Total no. of members: 19 (incl. Prime Minister)
- Member parties: Independents; External support: PdL, PD, UdC, FLI
- Status in legislature: Supermajority (national unity)
- Opposition parties: LN, IdV

History
- Outgoing election: 2013 election
- Legislature term: XVI Legislature (2008–2013)
- Predecessor: Fourth Berlusconi government
- Successor: Letta government

The Monti government was the sixty-first government of Italy and was announced on 16 November 2011. This Experts' cabinet was composed of independents, three of whom were women and was formed as an interim government. The government ran the country for eighteen months until the aftermath of the elections in Spring 2013 and then replaced by the Letta government, formed by Enrico Letta on 28 April.

== Formation ==
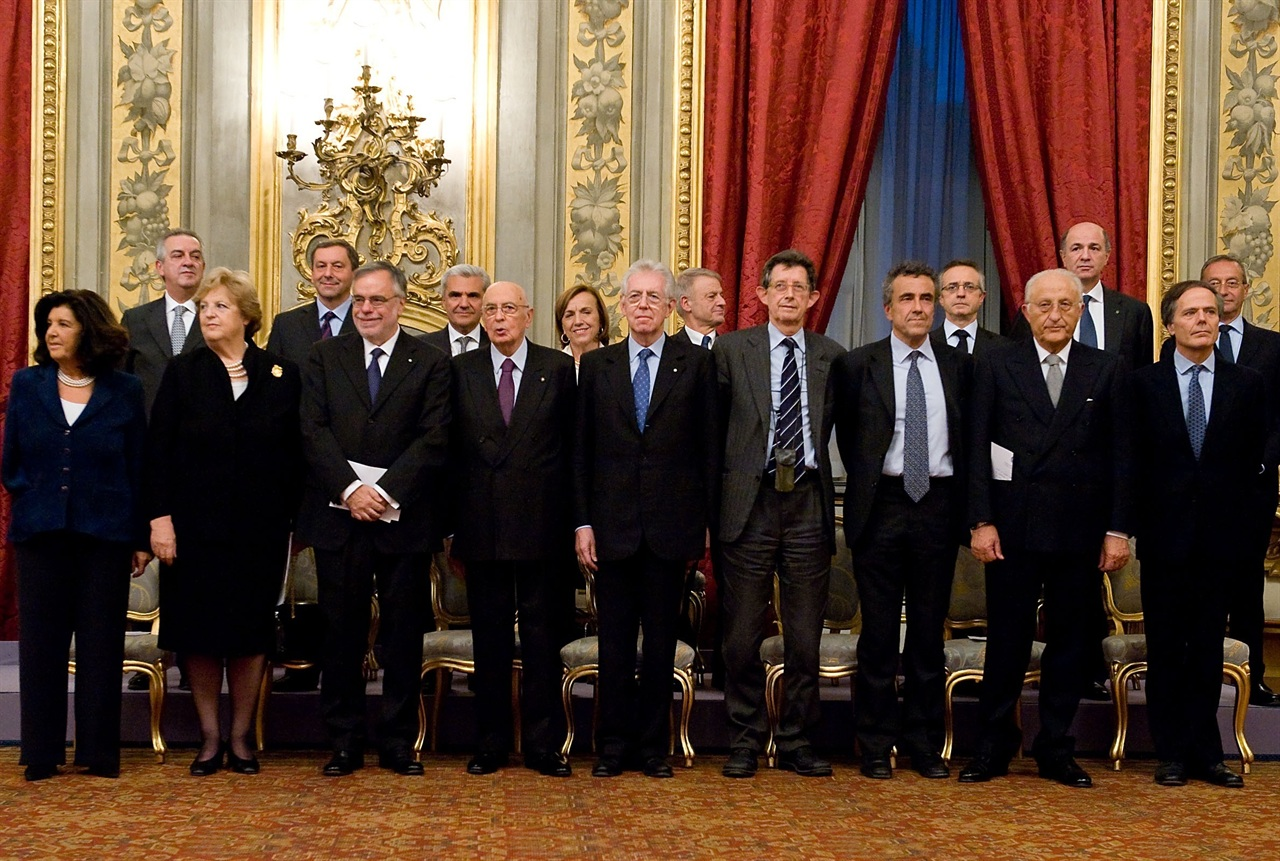
Monti's government during the oath.

On 9 November 2011 Mario Monti, an economist and former European Commissioner, was appointed a senator for life by Italian President Giorgio Napolitano. He was seen as a favourite to replace Silvio Berlusconi and lead a new unity government in Italy in order to implement reforms and austerity measures. The ultimate purpose of Monti's appointment was to save Italy from the eurozone sovereign debt crisis.

On 12 November 2011, following Berlusconi's resignation, Napolitano asked Monti to form a new government. Monti accepted, and held talks with the leaders of the main Italian political parties, declaring that he wanted to form a government that would remain in office until the next scheduled general elections in 2013. On 16 November 2011, Monti was sworn in as Prime Minister of Italy, after making known a technocratic government composed entirely of unelected professionals. He also chose to hold personally the post of Minister of Economy and Finance. His tenure in the latter post lasted until 11 July 2012 when Vittorio Grilli, previously vice-minister, became Minister.

On 17 and 18 November 2011, the Italian Senate and Italian Chamber of Deputies both passed motions of confidence supporting Monti's government, with only the Northern League voting against.

== Investiture votes ==
17–18 November 2011 Investiture votes for the Monti Cabinet
House of Parliament	Vote	Parties	Votes
Senate of the Republic (Voting: 306 (Note: Absent (12): PdL (6), PD (2), UDC–SVP–Aut (1), Others (3) On institutional leave (3): CN (2), Others (1) President (1)) of 322, Majority: 154)	Yes	PdL (121), PD (104), UDC–SVP–Aut (14), Third Pole (ApI–FLI) (13), IdV (10), CN (10), Others (7)	281 / 306
Senate of the Republic (Voting: 306 of 322, Majority: 154)	No	LN (25)	25 / 306
Senate of the Republic (Voting: 306 of 322, Majority: 154)	Abstention	None	0 / 306
Chamber of Deputies (Voting: 617 (Note: Absent (12): PdL (6), FLI (3), PD (1), IdV (1), PT (1) On institutional leave (1): UDC (1)) of 630, Majority: 309)	Yes	PdL (205), PD (205), UdC (37), FLI (23), PT (22), IdV (21), Others (43)	556 / 617
Chamber of Deputies (Voting: 617 of 630, Majority: 309)	No	LN (59), PdL (1), PT (1)	61 / 617
Chamber of Deputies (Voting: 617 of 630, Majority: 309)	Abstention	None	0 / 617

== Composition ==
Office	Portrait	Name	Term of office	Party
Prime Minister		Mario Monti	16 November 2011 – 28 April 2013	Independent
Prime Minister	Undersecretaries: Antonio Catricalà (Ind.) – Delegated to Administrative Coordination; Paolo Peluffo (Ind.) – Delegated to Information and Communications, Publishing and Administrative Coordination (since 19 January 2012); Carlo Malinconico (Ind.) – Delegated to Publishing (until 10 January 2012); Gianni De Gennaro (Ind.) – Delegated to Authority for the Security of the Republic (since 11 May 2012)			
Minister of Foreign Affairs		Giulio Terzi di Sant'Agata	16 November 2011 – 26 March 2013	Independent
Minister of Foreign Affairs		Mario Monti (Acting)	26 March 2013 – 28 April 2013	Independent
Minister of Foreign Affairs	Deputy Minister: Marta Dassù (since 27 March 2013); Undersecretaries: Marta Dassù (until 27 March 2013); Staffan de Mistura (since 27 March 2013)			
Minister of the Interior		Anna Maria Cancellieri	16 November 2011 – 28 April 2013	Independent
Minister of the Interior	Undersecretaries: Carlo De Stefano (Ind.); Giovanni Ferrara (Ind.); Saverio Ruperto (Ind.)			
Minister of Justice		Paola Severino	16 November 2011 – 28 April 2013	Independent
Minister of Justice	Undersecretaries: Salvatore Mazzamuto (Ind.); Andrea Zoppini (Ind.) (until 15 May 2012); Antonino Gullo (Ind.) (since 6 July 2012); Sabato Malinconico (Ind.) (since 6 July 2012)			
Minister of Defence		Giampaolo Di Paola	16 November 2011 – 28 April 2013	Independent
Minister of Defence	Undersecretaries: Filippo Milone (Ind.); Gianluigi Magri (Ind.)			
Minister of Economy and Finance		Mario Monti (Acting)	16 November 2011 – 11 July 2012	Independent
Minister of Economy and Finance		Vittorio Grilli	11 July 2012 – 28 April 2013	Independent
Minister of Economy and Finance	Deputy Minister: Vittorio Grilli (Ind.) (until 11 July 2012); Undersecretaries: Vieri Ceriani (Ind.); Gianfranco Polillo (Ind.)			
Minister of Economic Development, Infrastructure and Transport		Corrado Passera	16 November 2011 – 28 April 2013	Independent
Minister of Economic Development, Infrastructure and Transport	Deputy Minister: Mario Ciaccia (Ind.) (Infrastructure and Transport); Undersecretaries: Claudio De Vincenti (Ind.) (Economic Development); Massimo Vari (Ind.) (Economic Development); Guido Improta (Ind.) (Infrastructure and Transport)			
Minister of Agricultural, Food and Forestry Policies		Mario Catania	16 November 2011 – 28 April 2013	Independent
Minister of Agricultural, Food and Forestry Policies	Undersecretary: Franco Braga (Ind.)			
Minister of the Environment		Corrado Clini	16 November 2011 – 28 April 2013	Independent
Minister of the Environment	Undersecretary: Tullio Fanelli (Ind.)			
Minister of Labour and Social Policies		Elsa Fornero	16 November 2011 – 28 April 2013	Independent
Minister of Labour and Social Policies	Deputy Minister: Michel Martone (Ind.); Undersecretary: Maria Cecilia Guerra (Ind.)			
Minister of Education, University and Research		Francesco Profumo	16 November 2011 – 28 April 2013	Independent
Minister of Education, University and Research	Undersecretaries: Elena Ugolini (Ind.); Marco Rossi-Doria (Ind.)			
Minister of Cultural Heritage and Activities		Lorenzo Ornaghi	16 November 2011 – 28 April 2013	Independent
Minister of Cultural Heritage and Activities	Undersecretary: Roberto Cecchi (Ind.)			
Minister of Health		Renato Balduzzi	16 November 2011 – 28 April 2013	Independent
Minister of Health	Undersecretary: Adelfio Elio Cardinale (Ind.)			
Minister for Parliamentary Relations and Implementation of the Government Program (without portfolio)		Dino Piero Giarda	16 November 2011 – 28 April 2013	Independent
Minister for Parliamentary Relations and Implementation of the Government Program (without portfolio)	Undersecretaries: Giampaolo D'Andrea (Ind.); Antonio Malaschini (Ind.)			
Minister of Public Administration (without portfolio)		Filippo Patroni Griffi	16 November 2011 – 28 April 2013	Independent
Minister of Regional Affairs, Tourism and Sport (without portfolio)		Piero Gnudi	16 November 2011 – 28 April 2013	Independent
Minister of European Affairs (without portfolio)		Enzo Moavero Milanesi	16 November 2011 – 28 April 2013	Independent
Minister for Territorial Cohesion (without portfolio)		Fabrizio Barca	16 November 2011 – 28 April 2013	Independent
Minister for Integration and International Cooperation (without portfolio)		Andrea Riccardi	16 November 2011 – 28 April 2013	Independent
Secretary of the Council of Ministers		Antonio Catricalà	16 November 2011 – 28 April 2013	Independent

== Notable actions ==
On 9 October 2012, Interior Minister Anna Maria Cancellieri sacked the municipal administration of Reggio Calabria (mayor, assessors, councillors) for alleged links to the organised crime syndicate 'Ndrangheta after a months long investigation and replaced it with three central government appointed administrators to govern for 18 months until a new election in 2014. This was the first time the government of a provincial capital had been dismissed.

== See also ==
- Government of Experts
