= Minister of Education, University and Research =

Ministry in the Cabinet of Italy

This is a list of the Italian ministers of education, university and research, a position which led the Ministry of Education, University and Research. The last minister was Lorenzo Fioramonti of the Five Star Movement, who was in office until December 2019, when, after his resignation, the ministry was split between public education and university and research.

== List of ministers ==
Parties:

- Democratic Party of the Left
- Forza Italia / The People of Freedom
- Democratic Party
- Five Star Movement
- Independent

Coalitions:

- Centre-left coalition
- Centre-right coalition
- Mixed coalition

N.	Portrait	Name (Born–Died)	Term of office			Party	Government	Ref.
N.	Portrait	Name (Born–Died)	Took office	Left office	Time in office	Party	Government	Ref.
1		Luigi Berlinguer (1932–2023)	17 May 1996	21 October 1998	2 years, 157 days	Democratic Party of the Left	Prodi I	
Office not in use (Note: The Ministry was split between the Minister of Education and the Minister of University and Research.)			1998–2001				D'Alema I·II; Amato II	
2		Letizia Moratti (1949–)	11 June 2001	17 May 2006	4 years, 340 days	Forza Italia	Berlusconi II·III	
Office not in use (Note: The Ministry was split between the Minister of Education and the Minister of University and Research.)			2006–2008				Prodi II	
3		Mariastella Gelmini (1973–)	8 May 2008	16 November 2011	3 years, 192 days	The People of Freedom	Berlusconi IV	
4		Francesco Profumo (1953– )	16 November 2011	28 April 2013	1 year, 163 days	Independent	Monti	
5		Maria Chiara Carrozza (1965–)	28 April 2013	22 February 2014	300 days	Democratic Party	Letta	
6		Stefania Giannini (1960–)	22 February 2014	12 December 2016	2 years, 294 days	Civic Choice / Democratic Party	Renzi	
7		Valeria Fedeli (1949–)	12 December 2016	1 June 2018	1 year, 171 days	Democratic Party	Gentiloni	
8		Marco Bussetti (1962– )	1 June 2018	5 September 2019	1 year, 96 days	Independent	Conte I	
9		Lorenzo Fioramonti (1977– )	5 September 2019	25 December 2019	111 days	Five Star Movement	Conte II	
10		Giuseppe Conte (1964– ) Acting	25 December 2019	10 January 2020	16 days	Independent	Conte II	
Office not in use (Note: The Ministry was split between the Minister of Education and the Minister of University and Research.)			2019–present				Conte II; Draghi	
