= Technocratic government (Italy) =

Form of Non party affiliated government in the wake of a crisis

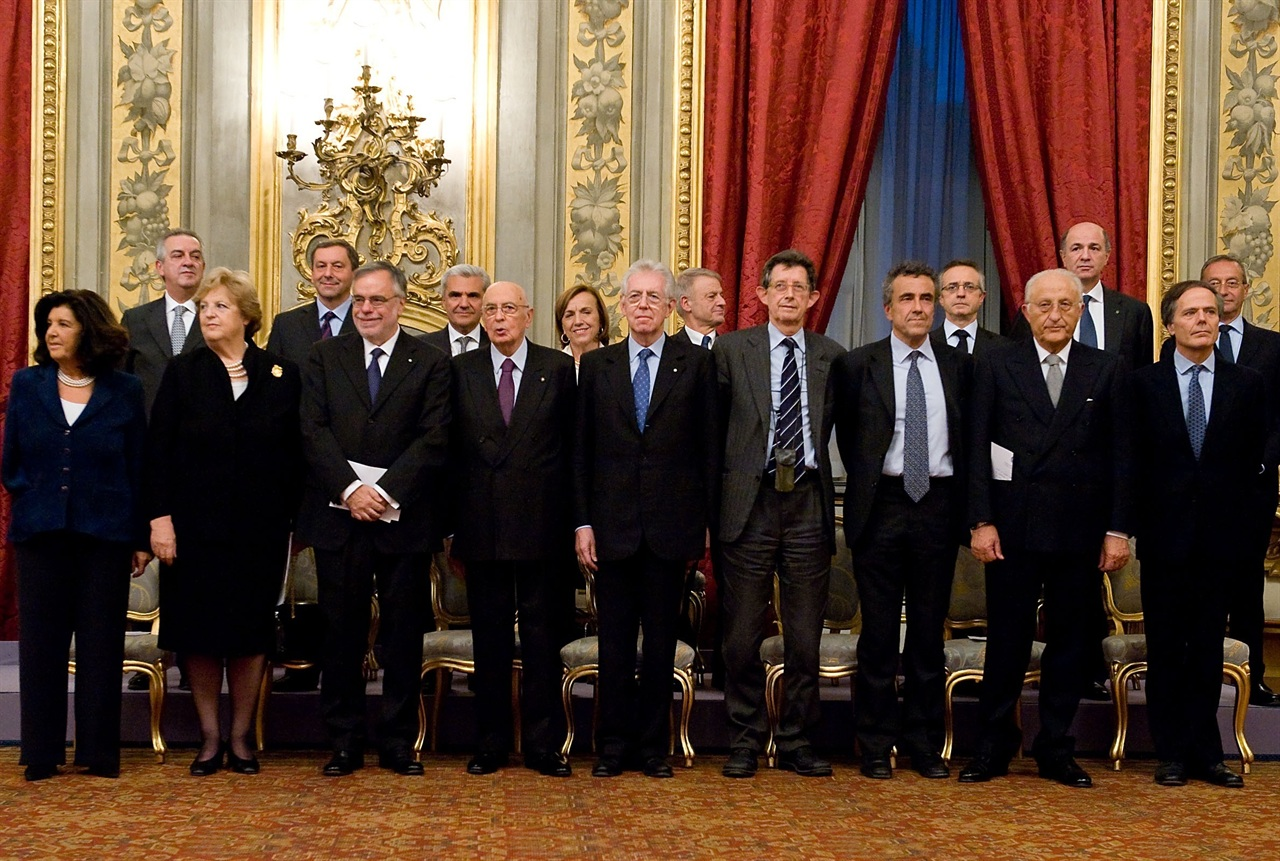
Ministers of the government of experts led by Mario Monti, formed in November 2011, following the collapse of the fourth Berlusconi government, which was tasked to deal with the effects the Great Recession.

In Italy, technocratic government (Italian: governo tecnocratico), also called technical government (governo tecnico), government of technicians (governo dei tecnici), or government of experts (governo degli esperti), is the term used to refer to a cabinet (Council of Ministers) made up of experts not officially affiliated to any political party or political coalition. There have been two to four (depending on the definition) such governments in the history of Italy: the Ciampi government, the Dini government, the Monti government, and the Draghi government, with the Ciampi and Draghi governments also including political ministers. These governments tend to be formed during emergencies, usually an economic crisis, and are seen by some as undemocratic. As a result and as elsewhere, technocracy in Italy has often proved to be controversial.

== Context ==
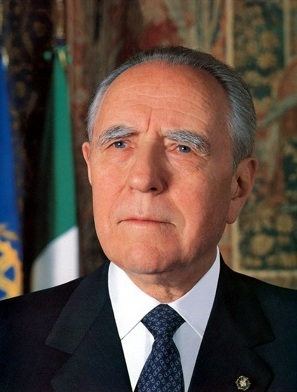
Carlo Azeglio Ciampi, the first non-member of Parliament to serve as prime minister, led a governo di scopo.

In a technocratic government, major decisions are not made by elected politicians, and the government policy is not decided by party leaders. The Constitution of Italy allows non-members of the Italian Parliament to serve as prime minister of Italy, as it simply states that the prime minister is appointed by the president of the Italian Republic and must win a confidence vote in both houses of Parliament within ten days of said appointment.

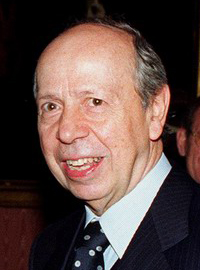
Lamberto Dini headed the first Italian technocratic government made up only of experts.

In some cases, in the aftermath of political turmoil, multiple parties that make up a majority in Parliament agreed to support a neutral cabinet of experts headed by an independent prime minister, voting in favour of motions of confidence in the government, which is something similar to a confidence and supply agreement. Said cabinets of experts were tasked to deal with the crises and emergencies; once the critical situations were deemed to have been solved, the technocratic governments resigned, allowing for new elections to be held and for a prime minister with a direct mandate from the people to take their place.

There have been two "governments of experts" in Italian history: the Dini government and the Monti government. Some cabinets, such as those of the Ciampi government (1993–1994) and the Draghi government (2021–2022), were called "technocratic government" or "government of experts", even though they included elected politicians and senior party members in their makeup.

== See also ==
- Caretaker government
- Government of national unity
- Grand coalition
- Independent politician
- Technocracy

== Bibliography ==
- Roberto Bin; Giovanni Pitruzzella [in Italian] (2005). Public Law. Torino: Giappichelli. ISBN 88-348-5674-0.
- Fabrizio, Politi. "Government of Experts". Trecciani Governo tecnico Libro dell'anno 2013.
