= Andrea Riccardi =

Italian politician

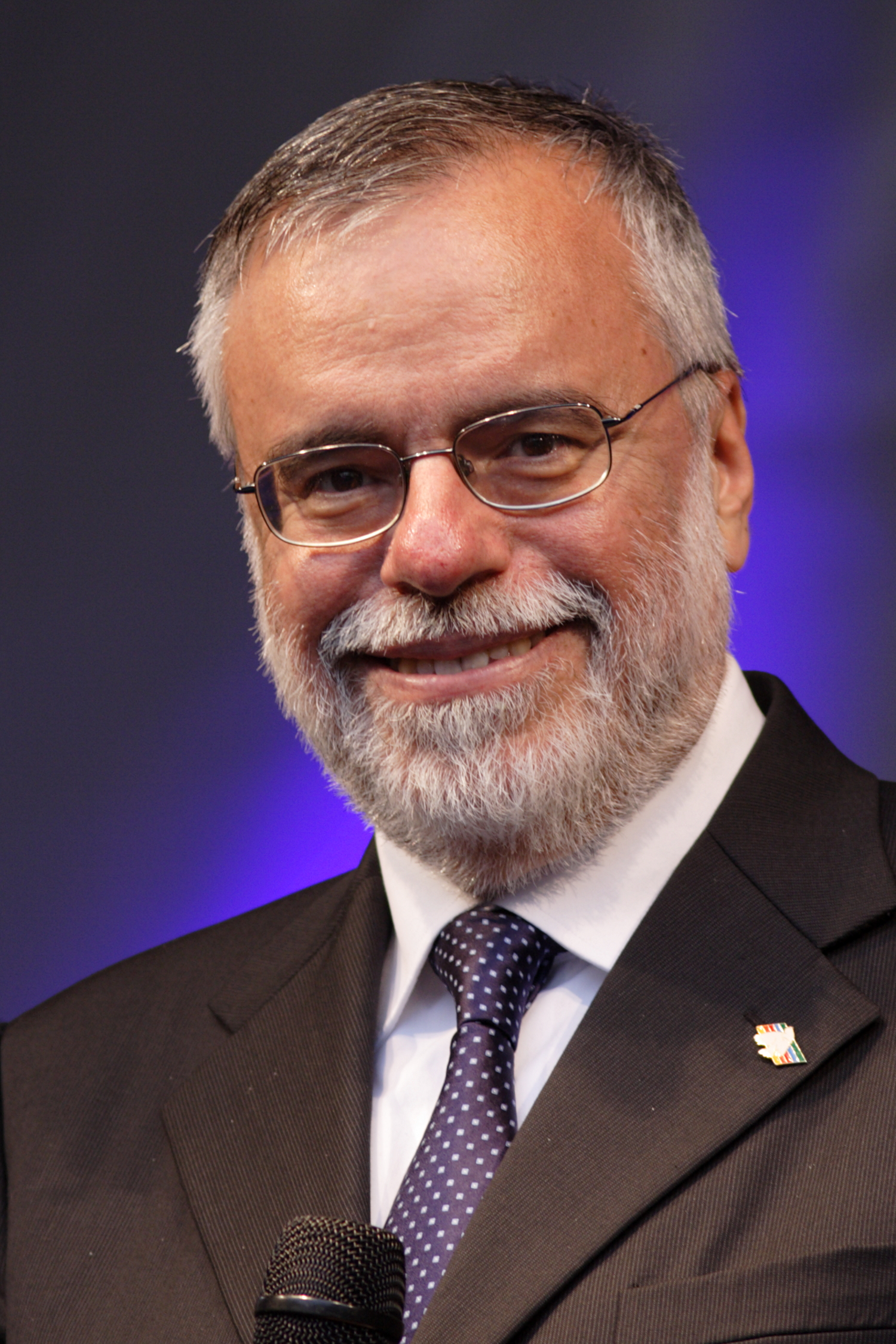
- Andrea Riccardi in Aachen, 2009.

Minister for International Cooperation and Integration
- In office 16 November 2011 – 28 April 2013
- Prime Minister: Mario Monti
- Preceded by: Office established
- Succeeded by: Cécile Kyenge

Personal details
- Born: 16 January 1950 (age 76) Rome, Italy
- Party: Independent
- Other political affiliations: Civic Choice (2013)
- Education: Sapienza University of Rome
- Occupation: University professor

Andrea Riccardi (born 16 January 1950) is an Italian historian, professor, politician and activist, founder of the Community of Sant'Egidio. He was part of a team of mediators who negotiating the Rome General Peace Accords in 1992 during the Mozambican Civil War. He served as minister for international cooperation without portfolio in the Monti Cabinet.

== Life ==
In 1999, he received the Houphouet-Boigny Peace Prize from the United Nations Educational, Scientific, and Cultural Organization. In November 2004, he was given the International Balzan Prize for Humanity, Peace and Brotherhood among Peoples. He has also taught at Sapienza University and the University of Bari.

Andrea Riccardi is also a member of the Fondation Chirac's honour committee, ever since the foundation was launched in 2008 by former French president Jacques Chirac in order to promote world peace. He also participated as jury member in 2009 for the Prize for Conflict Prevention awarded every year by this foundation. From 4 January 2013 to 16 May 2013 Riccardi was the president of Civic Choice, a centrist political party.

== Books ==
- Sant'Egidio, Rome and the World - by Andrea Riccardi, Peter Heinegg, ISBN 0-85439-559-8 / 9780854395590, Saint Paul Publications
- French Catholicism
- Homme et femme, le rêve de Dieu
- Il secolo del martirio. I cristiani nel Novecento (The Century of Martyrdom. Christians in the 20th Century), 2000
- Ils sont morts pour leur foi (They died for their faith), 2002

Awards
Preceded by Angela Merkel	Recipient of the Charlemagne Prize; 2009	Succeeded by Donald Tusk
Political offices
New title	Minister for International Cooperation and Integration; 2011–2013	Succeeded by Cécile Kyenge as Minister for Integration
Party political offices
New political party	President of Civic Choice; 2013	Succeeded by Mario Monti
