= Cécile Kyenge =

Italian politician and ophthalmologist

Cécile Kashetu Kyenge
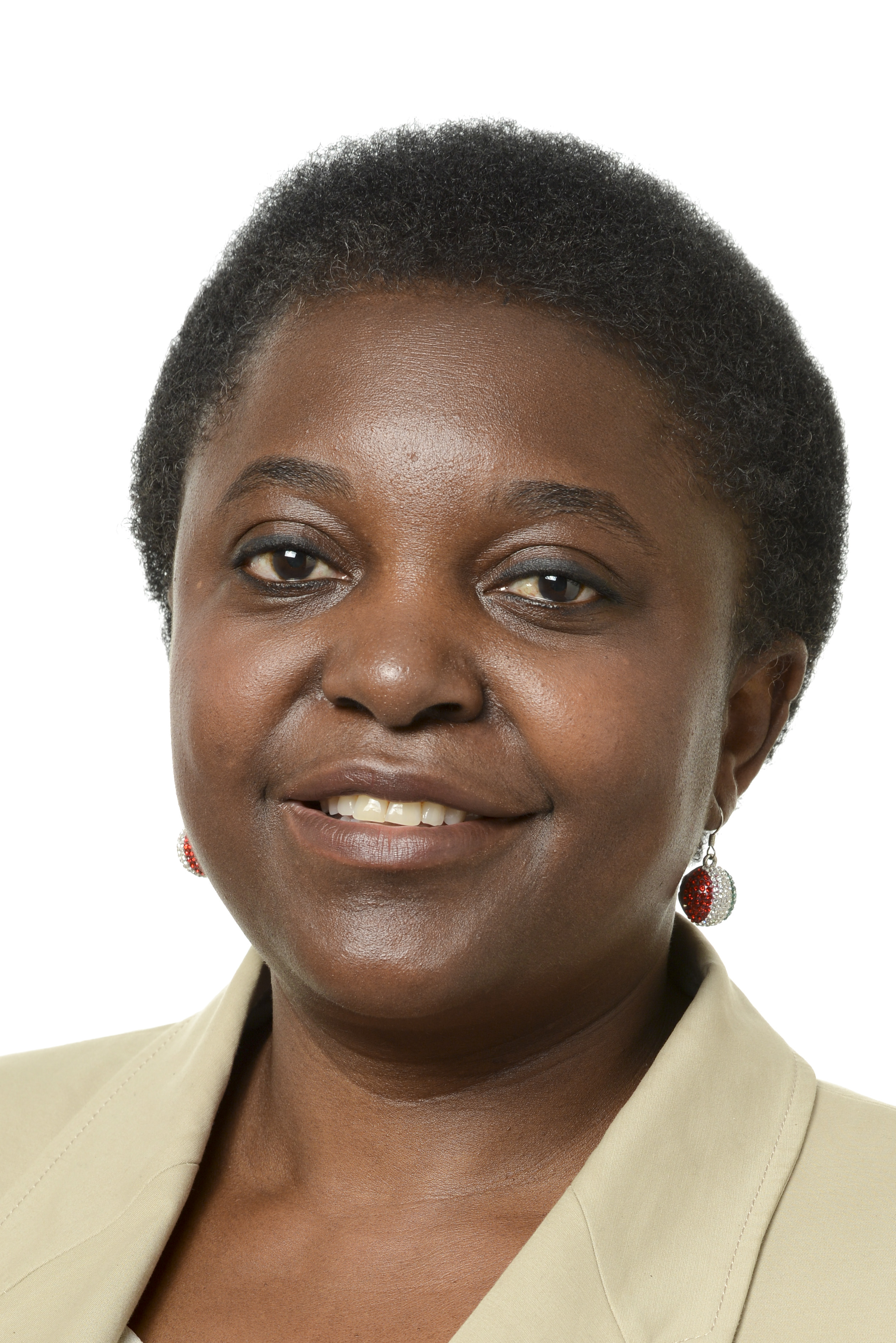
- Official portrait, 2014

Member of the European Parliament for North-East Italy
- In office 1 July 2014 – 2 July 2019

Minister for Integration
- In office 28 April 2013 – 22 February 2014
- President: Giorgio Napolitano
- Prime Minister: Enrico Letta
- Preceded by: Andrea Riccardi
- Succeeded by: Ministry abolished

Member of the Chamber of Deputies
- In office 26 February 2013 – 18 February 2014
- Constituency: Emilia-Romagna

Personal details
- Born: 28 August 1964 (age 62) Kambove, DR Congo
- Party: Democratic Party
- Spouse: Domenico Grispino (1994–2019)
- Children: 2
- Education: Università Cattolica del Sacro Cuore
- Profession: Ophthalmologist

Cécile Kashetu Kyenge (Italian: [seˈsil ˈkjɛŋɡe]; born Kashetu Kyenge, 28 August 1964) is an Italian politician and ophthalmologist. She served as the Minister for Integration in the Letta Cabinet and was an MEP in the 8th European parliament.

After moving to Italy in 1983 at the age of 19, she became a qualified ophthalmologist in Modena, Emilia-Romagna. She has founded an intercultural Association (DAWA) to promote mutual awareness, integration and cooperation between Italy and Africa, particularly in her country of birth, the Democratic Republic of Congo. She is also the spokesperson of the association "March First", which works to promote the rights of migrants in Italy.

In February 2013 she was elected member of the Chamber of Deputies for the Democratic Party in Emilia-Romagna. Two months later she was appointed Minister for Integration in the grand coalition government formed by Enrico Letta, becoming Italy's first black cabinet minister. She supports the introduction of a Jus soli law to grant citizenship to children of immigrants born on Italian soil.

== Early life and education ==
Kyenge was born in Kambove (Haut-Katanga District) in the Democratic Republic of Congo on 28 August 1964. She arrived in Italy with a student visa in 1983. She has a degree in medicine and surgery from the Università Cattolica del Sacro Cuore in Rome. She is a specialist in ophthalmology at the University of Modena and Reggio Emilia.

In 2002, she founded the Association for Intercultural DAWA ("dawa" is a Kiswahili word meaning "medicine"), with the aim of promoting mutual understanding of different cultures and develop processes of awareness, integration and cooperation between Italy and Africa, particularly in the Democratic Republic of Congo where Kyenge focuses mostly her efforts. Since September 2010, she has been the national spokesperson of the Italian association "March First" that works to promote the rights of migrants. She collaborates with various organizations and associations in national campaigns on the rights of citizenship. She collaborates with many Italian magazines, including Combonifem and Corriere Immigrazione, an online newspaper and a weekly journal on the culture of Italy of the present and future.

== Career ==
=== Early political career ===
In 2004, Kyenge was elected in a district of the town of Modena for the Democrats of the Left and later became the provincial head of the Forum of International Cooperation and Immigration.

On 7 June 2009, Kyenge was elected provincial councilor in Modena for the Democratic Party (PD) and joined the committee Welfare and social policies. She is also responsible for immigration policies in Emilia-Romagna for the Democratic Party.

On 25 February 2013, Kyenge was elected member of the Chamber of Deputies for the PD in Emilia-Romagna.
Immediately after her election to the Italian Parliament, with the support of other signatories (Pier Luigi Bersani, Khalid Chaouki and Roberto Speranza), she began to promote a plan for a law granting citizenship to children of immigrants born on Italian soil (a so-called Ius soli law).

=== Minister for Integration (2013-2014) ===
In April 2013, Kyenge was appointed Minister for Integration in the grand coalition government formed by Enrico Letta, becoming Italy's first black cabinet minister. Her ministerial nomination was repudiated in some circles on cultural and/or racial grounds, being met by racist insults from individual politicians belonging to the Northern League such as Roberto Calderoli, VP of the Italian Senate, who called her an orangutan, in addition to racist campaigns orchestrated by the New Force party and other far-right groups. Her treatment as Italy's first black minister has been described by The Economist as "shameful" with "limited condemnation". Writer and University of Tokyo Professor Flavio Rizzo further analysed the climate around Minister Kyenge in the context of Italian inability to relate to diversity and "the emergence of institutional racism".

=== European Parliament tenure (2014-2019) ===
Kyenge was elected to the European Parliament in the elections of 2014 as a candidate for the Democratic Party from the constituency of North-East Italy. During her time in parliament, she was a member of the Committee on Civil Liberties, Justice and Home Affairs. In addition to her committee assignments, she served as vice-chairwoman of the parliament's delegation to the ACP–EU Joint Parliamentary Assembly. She was also a member of the European Parliament Intergroup on Integrity (Transparency, Anti-Corruption and Organized Crime), the European Parliament Intergroup on Extreme Poverty and Human Rights and the European Parliament Intergroup on LGBT Rights. She was an MEP from 7 January 2014 through 7 January 2019.

Kyenge led the EU-Election Observer Mission for the 2015 general election in Burkina Faso.

== Personal life ==
Kyenge married engineer Domenico Grispino in 1994 and filed for divorce in 2019. Kyenge and Grispino have two daughters named Giulia and Maisha. Grispino is a supporter of Matteo Salvini and ran as a member of Lega Nord in 2019 for a municipal position. Kyenge lives in Castelfranco Emilia.
