= Minister for Integration (Italy) =

Ministry in the Cabinet of Italy

The minister for integration (Italian: ministro per l'integrazione) in Italy was one of the positions in the Italian government.

The latest minister for integration was Cécile Kyenge, who held the office from 28 April 2013 until 22 February 2014.

== List of ministers ==
Parties

Democratic Party Independent

Governments

Centre-left coalition Mixed coalition

Name (Born–Died)	Portrait	Term of office		Political party	Government
Minister for International Cooperation and Integration
Andrea Riccardi (1950– )		16 November 2011	28 April 2013	Independent	Monti
Minister for Integration
Cécile Kyenge (1964– )		28 April 2013	22 February 2014	Democratic Party	Letta
Office not in use		2014–present			Renzi; Gentiloni
Office not in use		2014–present			Conte I·II; Draghi
