= Gianni Letta =

Italian journalist and politician (born 1935)

Gianni Letta OMRI
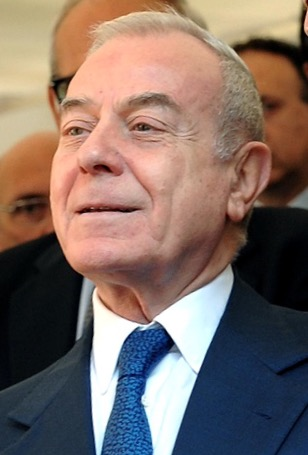

Secretary of the Council of Ministers
- In office 8 May 2008 – 16 November 2011
- Prime Minister: Silvio Berlusconi
- Preceded by: Enrico Letta
- Succeeded by: Antonio Catricalà
- In office 11 June 2001 – 17 May 2006
- Prime Minister: Silvio Berlusconi
- Preceded by: Enrico Luigi Micheli
- Succeeded by: Enrico Letta
- In office 10 May 1994 – 17 January 1995
- Prime Minister: Silvio Berlusconi
- Preceded by: Antonio Maccanico
- Succeeded by: Lamberto Cardia

Personal details
- Born: 15 April 1935 (age 91) Avezzano, Italy
- Party: PSDI (before 1994); FI (1994–2009); PdL (2009–2013); FI (since 2013)
- Height: 1.63 m (5 ft 4 in)
- Spouse: Maddalena Marignetti
- Children: 2

Giovanni "Gianni" Letta (born 15 April 1935) is an Italian journalist and politician. He was a close advisor of Silvio Berlusconi and is a member of the advisory board of Goldman Sachs International.

== Biography ==
After graduating in law, he started working as a journalist for several daily newspapers, as well as RAI and ANSA. He was editor-in-law of Il Tempo from 1973 to 1987; that year, he left the newspaper in order to enter into the Fininvest group owned by Silvio Berlusconi. He hosted a number of TV programmes, especially on Canale 5.

After Berlusconi's entry into politics, Letta became undersecretary of the first government led by Berlusconi in 1994, an office he took again from 2001 to 2006, and from 2008 to 2011. In 2010, CNN referred to Letta as "Berlusconi's right-hand man." Among Letta's duties for Berlusconi include co-ordinating the Italian government's activities with the Holy See. Gianni is an extremely close associate of Berlusconi, and was the best man at Berlusconi's wedding to Veronica Lario at the Palazzo Marino in 1990.

In 2006, Berlusconi nominated him as the House of Freedoms candidate to succeed Carlo Azeglio Ciampi as President of the Italian Republic. In the first ballot held on 8 May 2006, he received 369 votes, not enough to be elected. He received the votes from the right-wing coalition, but he was soundly refused by the majority of the house, L'Unione, for being considered as the factotum of Silvio Berlusconi. The election was won by Giorgio Napolitano, the candidate of L'Unione, on 10 May 2006.

On 18 June 2007, Letta was made a member of the advisory board of Goldman Sachs International, assigned by the bank to "provide strategic consulting on growth opportunities, with a special focus on Italy." Chairman of Goldman Sachs International Peter Sutherland said in the press statement that Letta was "an exceptional talent, with political experience and profound knowledge of Italian politics and the Italian and international market." Letta is the uncle of Enrico Letta, the Prime Minister from the centre-left Democratic Party.

He received the America Award of the Italy-USA Foundation in 2014. As of September 2020, he is a member of the Italian Aspen Institute.

== Honours and awards ==
- Italy: Grand Cross Knight of the Order of Merit of the Italian Republic (2002)
- Vatican City: Knight Grand Cross of the Pian Order (2005)
- Vatican City: Papal gentleman (2008)
- France: Knight of the Order of the Legion of Honour (2009)
- Italy: Gold Collar for Sporting Merit (2015)

Media offices
Preceded by -	Managing editor of Il Tempo; 1958–1973	Succeeded by -
Preceded by Renato Angiolillo	Editor in chief of Il Tempo; 1973–1987	Succeeded by Gaspare Barbiellini Amidei
Political offices
Preceded by Antonio Maccanico	Secretary to the Council of Ministers; 1994–1995	Succeeded by Lamberto Cardia
Preceded by Enrico Micheli	Secretary to the Council of Ministers; 2001–2006	Succeeded by Enrico Letta
Preceded by Enrico Letta	Secretary to the Council of Ministers; 2008–2011	Succeeded by Antonio Catricalà
