= Enzo Moavero Milanesi =

Italian politician (born 1954)

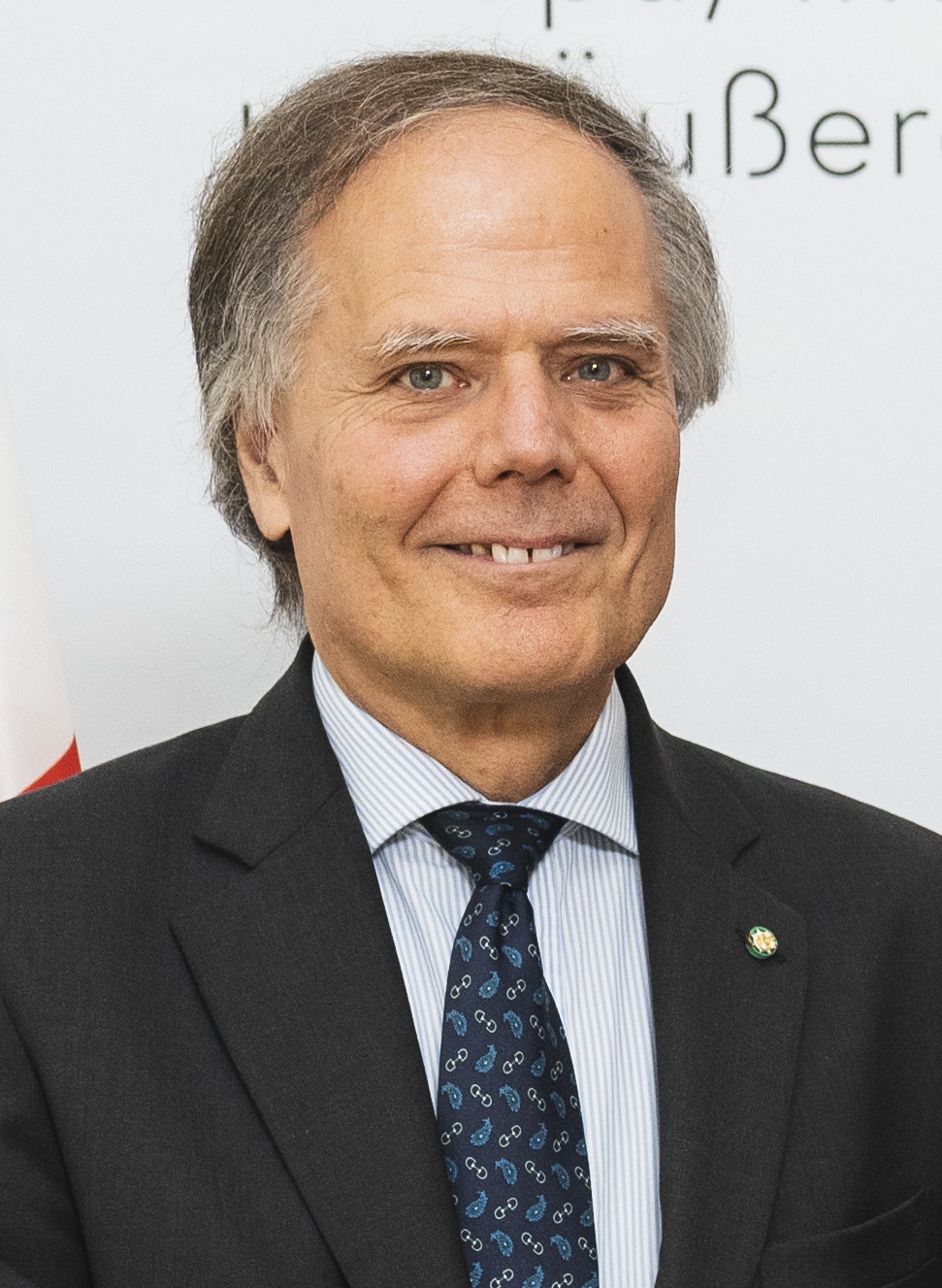

Minister of Foreign Affairs
- In office 1 June 2018 – 5 September 2019
- Prime Minister: Giuseppe Conte
- Preceded by: Angelino Alfano
- Succeeded by: Luigi Di Maio

Chairperson-in-Office of the Organization for Security and Co-operation in Europe
- In office 1 June 2018 – 1 January 2019
- Preceded by: Angelino Alfano
- Succeeded by: Miroslav Lajčák

Minister of European Affairs
- In office 16 November 2011 – 22 February 2014
- Prime Minister: Mario Monti; Enrico Letta
- Preceded by: Anna Maria Bernini
- Succeeded by: Paolo Savona

Personal details
- Born: 17 August 1954 (age 71) Rome, Italy
- Party: Civic Choice (2013–2014); Independent (2014–present)
- Education: Sapienza University; College of Europe

Enzo Moavero Milanesi (born 17 August 1954) is an Italian independent politician and law professor who served as Minister of Foreign Affairs in the first Cabinet of Giuseppe Conte from 1 June 2018 to 5 September 2019. He was also the Chairman-in-Office of the Organization for Security and Co-operation in Europe during the Italian Chairmanship of the organisation in 2018. He previously served as Deputy Secretary-General of the European Commission (2002–2005) and as Italy's Minister of European Affairs in the Monti Cabinet and the Letta Cabinet from 16 November 2011 to 22 February 2014. He is a graduate of the College of Europe.

== Early life and education ==
Milanesi was born on 17 August 1954. He is a descendant of Ferdinando Bocconi, who founded the Bocconi University in Milan. He graduated in law from the Sapienza University of Rome and continued his studies in Belgium, taking an LL.M. at the College of Europe (1981–1982, Johan Beyen promotion).

== Career ==
=== European and political career ===
Milanesi served in the Guardia di Finanza from 1977 to 1979, and subsequently worked for 20 years for the European Commission in Brussels. In 1994, Carlo Azeglio Ciampi appointed Milanesi Undersecretary for European Affairs.

From 1995 to 2000 Milanesi served as chief of cabinet to European Commissioner Mario Monti, responsible for competition policy and the internal market. Milanesi served as Deputy Secretary-General of the European Commission from 2002 to 2005, in this capacity supporting Secretary General David O'Sullivan.

Milanesi was appointed as Minister of European Affairs in the Monti Cabinet on 16 November 2011 and reconfirmed in the following cabinet led by Prime Minister Enrico Letta on 28 April 2013. He left the cabinet on 22 February 2014.

Shortly after, European Commissioner for Internal Market and Services Michel Barnier appointed Milanesi as an unpaid special adviser on legal issues on implementation of single market rules. From 2015, he served as special adviser to Frans Timmermans, the First Vice President of the European Commission, on the Rule of Law and 'Better Regulation'.

Milanesi became the Minister of Foreign Affairs in the cabinet of Giuseppe Conte on 1 June 2018. Shortly after he took office, the ministry summoned French ambassador Christian Masset over remarks made by French President Emmanuel Macron condemning Italy's decision to close its ports to humanitarian rescue ships.

=== Teaching ===
From 1993 to 1996, Milanesi was Professor of Law at the Sapienza University and LUISS, and from 1996 to 2000, he taught at the Bocconi University, and again at the Sapienza University from 2002 to 2006. He is currently Professor of European Law and Director of the School of Law at LUISS. He is also a visiting professor at the College of Europe.

== Honours ==
=== National honours ===
- Commander of the Order of Merit of the Italian Republic (26 April 2000)
- Grand Officer of the Order of Merit of the Italian Republic (22 May 2002)
- Knight Grand Cross of the Order of Merit of the Italian Republic (16 February 2009)
- Recipient of the Italian Order of Merit for Culture and Art (20 April 2006)

=== Foreign honours ===
- Estonia: Member 1st Class of the Order of the Cross of Terra Mariana (2 July 2018)
- Latvia: Commander Grand Cross of the Cross of Recognition (29 June 2018)

Political offices
Preceded by Angelino Alfano	Minister of Foreign Affairs; 2018–2019	Succeeded by Luigi Di Maio
Diplomatic posts
Preceded by Angelino Alfano	Chair of the Organization for Security and Co-operation in Europe; 2018–2019	Succeeded by Miroslav Lajčák
