= Marianna Madia =

Italian politician (born 1980)

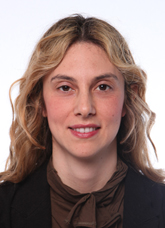

Minister of Simplification and Public Administration
- In office 22 February 2014 – 1 June 2018
- Prime Minister: Matteo Renzi; Paolo Gentiloni
- Preceded by: Gianpiero D'Alia
- Succeeded by: Giulia Bongiorno

Member of the Chamber of Deputies
- Incumbent
- Assumed office 29 April 2008
- Constituency: Lazio 1

Personal details
- Born: Maria Anna Madia; 9 May 1980 (age 46) Rome, Italy
- Party: PD (2007-2026); Italia Viva (since 2026)
- Spouse: Mario Gianani (m. 2013)
- Education: Sapienza University of Rome; IMT Institute for Advanced Studies Lucca
- Profession: Politician, journalist

Maria Anna "Marianna" Madia (Italian pronunciation: [mariˈanna maˈdiːa]; born 5 September 1980) is an Italian politician of the Democratic Party and a member of the Italian Chamber of Deputies since 2008.

She was Minister of Public Administration and Simplification from 22 February 2014 to 1 June 2018 (Renzi Cabinet and Gentiloni Cabinet).

== Biography ==
Madia was born in Rome in 1980. Her family came from Calabria and settled in Rome. Her great-grandfather, Titta Madia, was a lawyer, journalist, and Fascist and MSI member of the Chamber of Deputies. Her father was the politician, journalist and actor Stefano Madia.

She studied at Lycée français Chateaubriand in Rome. She studied at the University of Rome La Sapienza and undertook a PhD at IMT Institute for Advanced Studies Lucca in political science.

In June 2013 she married Mario Gianani, a television and film producer. They have twins, Francesco and Margherita, born on 8 April 2014.

She considers herself a practising Catholic.

== Career ==
Madia began her career in February 2008 when she was chosen by the Secretary of the Democratic Party, Walter Veltroni, who proposed her to be candidate for Chamber of Deputies. In April 2008 she was elected. She was reelected in 2013 and in 2018.
