= Gianpiero D'Alia =

Italian politician (born 1966)

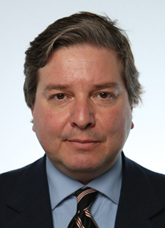
- D'Alia in 2013

Minister for Public Administration and Simplification
- In office 28 April 2013 – 22 February 2014
- Prime Minister: Enrico Letta
- Preceded by: Filippo Patroni Griffi
- Succeeded by: Marianna Madia

Member of the Chamber of Deputies
- In office 30 May 2001 – 28 April 2008
- In office 15 March 2013 – 22 March 2018

Member of the Senate of Republic
- In office 29 April 2008 – 14 March 2013
- Constituency: Sicily

President of the Union of the Centre
- In office 22 March 2014 – 2 November 2016

Personal details
- Born: 22 September 1966 (age 59) Messina, Italy
- Party: DC (1987–1994); CCD (1994–2002); UdC (2001–2016); CpE (since 2016)
- Education: University of Messina
- Profession: Politician, lawyer

Gianpiero D'Alia (born 22 September 1966) is an Italian politician.

== Early life and education ==
Gianpiero D'Alia was born on 22 September 1966 in Messina. His father was the former Christian Democracy (DC) deputy Salvatore D'Alia. He graduated in law at the University of Messina, and became a cassationist lawyer.

== Career ==
D'Alia started his career among the ranks of the DC. When the DC was dissolved, he joined the Christian Democratic Centre (CCD). With the CCD, he was elected to the Chamber of Deputies for the first time in the 2001 Italian general election. He then joined the Union of the Centre (UdC) in 2002. In 2005, D'Alia became Undersecretary to the Ministry of the Interior in the third Berlusconi government. In the 2006 Italian general election, he was re-elected as a Deputy. He was elected in the constituency of Sicily a member of the Senate of the Republic in the 2008 Italian general election. In the 2013 Italian general election D’Alia was re-elected to the Chamber of Deputies and together with the other members of the UdC joined the Civic Choice (SC) group. In December 2013, he and the others left the SC group to found the new group called For Italy. On 22 March 2014, D’Alia was appointed as president of the UdC, after losing the race for secretary against Lorenzo Cesa in the fourth national congress of the party.

In 2015, D'Alia joined the Popular Area (AP) group, together with the other UdC deputies. On 2 November 2016, Cesa suspended D'Alia from the party and referred him to arbitrators, accusing him of highly offensive statements against the same party. He had declared a few days before "the UdC is dead". D'Alia left the UdC to launch Centrists for Sicily (CpS), a new party formed in the Sicilian Regional Assembly (ARS). In 2017, he became the coordinator of Centrists for Europe (CpE), the new party launched by Pier Ferdinando Casini.

Political offices
Preceded by Filippo Patroni Griffi	Minister for Public Administration and Simplification; 2013–2014	Succeeded by Marianna Madia
Assembly seats
Preceded by Rocco Buttiglione	President of the Union of the Centre; 2014–2016	Succeeded by Antonio De Poli
