= Francesco Profumo =

Italian politician

Italian Minister of Education
- In office 16 November 2011 – 28 April 2013
- Prime Minister: Mario Monti
- Preceded by: Mariastella Gelmini
- Succeeded by: Maria Chiara Carrozza

Personal details
- Born: 3 May 1953 (age 73) Savona, Italy
- Party: Independent

Francesco Profumo (born 3 May 1953) is an Italian engineer and academic who was Italy's Minister of Education from 16 November 2011 to 28 April 2013. He has been president of the National Research Council (CNR) since August 2011 and had previously been Chancellor of the Polytechnic University of Turin from 2005 to 2011.

From 2016 to 2024, he was chairman of Compagnia di San Paolo.

Formerly Chairman of Iren SpA (2013–2016), he has been Chairman of the Fondazione Bruno Kessler since 2014. Since July 2014, he has been Chairman of the ESCP Business School at its Turin campus. As of 2023, he is the Rector of OPIT – Open Institute of Technology.

He has been a member of the European Innovation Council Board of the European Commission since 2022. Since May 2024, he has been chairman of Isybank, the digital bank of Intesa Sanpaolo Group.

== Early life and education ==
Profumo studied electronic engineering at the Polytechnic University of Turin and graduated in 1977.

== Career ==
Profumo started his professional career in research and development at Ansaldo in Genova in 1978 and was there until 1984. In 1985, he moved to Turin as a researcher and associate professor at the local Polytechnic University of Turin. In 2003, he was named dean of the 1st engineering faculty of the Politecnico, and in 2005, he became rector of the university. As of September 2020, he is a member of the Italian Aspen Institute.

Professor of Electrical Machines and Drives at the Polytechnic University of Turin, he is currently Professor Emeritus of the university. He has authored approximately 250 contributions, including articles and publications in international journals, and is a member of several scientific associations such as IEEE, JIEE, IEE, and EPE. He also is President of the Uni-Italia Association.

In the past, he has been on the boards of Reply, FIDIA S.p.A., and Unicredit Private Bank. On 12 April 2011, he was appointed to the Board of Directors of Telecom Italia. He has also held advisory roles for Il Sole 24 Ore and Pirelli & C., and is a member of the Steering Committee of Italianieuropei.

From 13 August 2011 to January 2012, he was President of the Italian National Research Council (CNR).

On 16 November 2011, Prime Minister Mario Monti appointed him Minister of Education.

== Minister of Education ==
On 16 November 2011, he was appointed Minister of Education, Universities, and Research in the Monti government, a role he held until the government's conclusion in 2013.

On 30 January 2012, Profumo resigned from his position as President of the CNR (National Research Council), a role he had been appointed to just a few months earlier by former Minister of Education Mariastella Gelmini. The resignation came after controversy arose regarding the simultaneous holding of both positions, as the CNR presidency is a government-appointed role. Prior to officially assuming the ministerial post, Profumo had already temporarily stepped aside from his duties at the CNR, delegating responsibilities to the vice president.

=== After the ministerial appointment ===
Profumo was appointed president of the energy company Iren where he was Chairman from 2013 to 2016. On 13 December 2014, he was appointed chairman of the Bruno Kessler Foundation in Trento, Italy, and on 5 September 2014, he was appointed chairman of the School of Advanced Management Training (SAFM) in Turin, Italy.

On 18 May 2015, he was appointed chairman of the board of INWIT, Infrastrutture Wireless Italiane S.p.A., a company of the Telecom Italia group.

In 2019, he was unanimously elected President of ACRI, a position he held until 21 February 2024.

Since 2016, he has headed Compagnia di San Paolo, where he was reconfirmed for a second term in 2020, until 16 April 2024, when Marco Gilli succeeded him.

Since 2018, he has been a member of the Giovanni Agnelli Foundation.

Since 2020, he has been Chairman of the Uni-Italia Association. In 2024, he became Chairman of isybank, the Quadrivio Fund, and the Reggio Children Foundation – Centro Loris Malaguzzi ETS.

Since 2025, he has been Chairman of Società Gasdotti Italia, and he has also continued to be Rector of OPIT – Open Institute of Technology since 2022, and as Chairman of the Turin campus of the ESCP Business School since 2014.

He is a member of the European Innovation Council of the European Commission.

== Other activities ==
- Istituto Affari Internazionali (IAI), Member of the Board

Academic offices
Preceded by Giovanni Del Tin	Dean of Polytechnic University of Turin; 2005–2011	Succeeded by Marco Gilli
Preceded by Luciano Maiani	President of National Research Council of Italy; 2011–2012	Succeeded by Luigi Nicolais
Political offices
Preceded by Mariastella Gelmini	Italian Minister of Education; 2011–2013	Succeeded by Maria Chiara Carrozza
