= Marta Dassù =

Italian politician

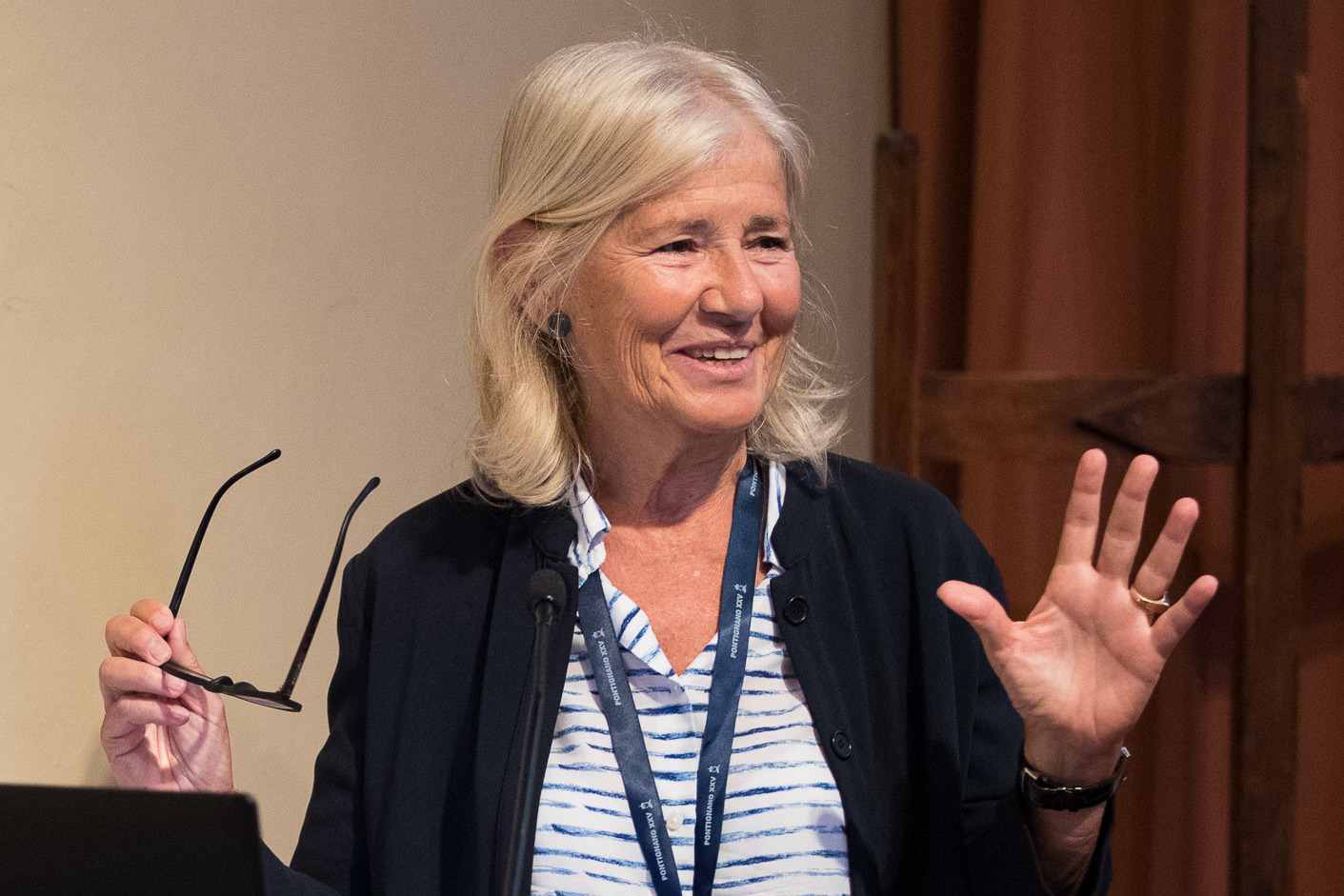
Marta Dassù

Marta Dassù (born 8 March 1955) is an Italian politician who served as Undersecretary of Foreign Affairs in the government led by Mario Monti from 2011 to 2013 and as Deputy Minister of Foreign Affairs in the government of Enrico Letta from 2013 to 2014. She serves as Senior Director of European Affairs at the Aspen Institute and Editor-in-Chief of Aspen Institute Italia's journal, Aspenia. She is a regular contributor to the Italian newspaper La Stampa.

In 2020, Dassù was appointed by NATO Secretary General Jens Stoltenberg to join a group of experts to support his work in a reflection process to further strengthen NATO's political dimension.

== Other activities ==
=== Corporate boards ===
- Finmeccanica, Member of the board of directors
- Trevi Finanziaria, Non-executive and Independent Member of the board of directors

=== Non-profit organizations ===
- European Council on Foreign Relations (ECFR), Member of the Board (since 2019)
- The Center for American Studies in Rome, Vice President
- European Institute of Peace (EIP), Member of the Advisory Council
- European Policy Centre (EPC), Member of the Strategic Council
- Fondazione Eni Enrico Mattei, Member of the Board
- International Institute for Strategic Studies (IISS), Member of the Board
- Istituto Affari Internazionali (IAI), Member board of directors
- LUISS School of Government, Member of the Scientific Committee
- Trilateral Commission, Member of the European Group
