= Filippo Patroni Griffi =

Italian politician and magistrate

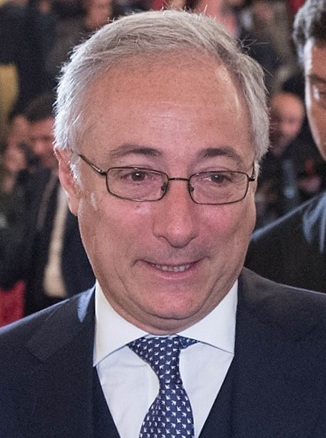

Judge of the Constitutional Court of Italy
- Incumbent
- Assumed office 29 January 2022
- Appointed by: Italian Council of State
- Preceded by: Giancarlo Coraggio

President of the Italian Council of State
- In office 25 September 2018 – 29 January 2022
- Preceded by: Alessandro Pajno
- Succeeded by: Franco Frattini

Secretary of the Council of Ministers
- In office 28 April 2013 – 22 February 2014
- Prime Minister: Enrico Letta
- Preceded by: Antonio Catricalà
- Succeeded by: Graziano Delrio

Minister of Public Administration
- In office 29 November 2011 – 28 April 2013
- Prime Minister: Mario Monti
- Preceded by: Renato Brunetta
- Succeeded by: Gianpiero D'Alia

Personal details
- Born: 27 August 1955 (age 71) Naples, Italy
- Party: Independent
- Education: University of Naples Federico II
- Profession: Politician, magistrate

Filippo Patroni Griffi (born 27 August 1955 in Naples) is an Italian politician and magistrate who served as Minister of Public Administration between 2011 and 2013.

== Biography ==
Filippo Patroni Griffi comes from an aristocratic Neapolitan family, son of magistrate and relative of the director Giuseppe Patroni Griffi. He was ordinary magistrate and administrative judge at the TAR. Subsequently, he became Councilor and then President of the Council of State. For a long time he held the technical office of Head of the Legislative Office of the Ministry of Public Administration with the ministers Sabino Cassese, Giovanni Motzo, Franco Bassanini and Franco Frattini.

He was also Chief of the Cabinet of the Minister for Institutional Reforms Giuliano Amato (Prodi I Cabinet), head of the public service cabinet with Minister Renato Brunetta (Berlusconi IV Cabinet) and head of the Legal Affairs Department of the Council Presidency in the Prodi II Cabinet. He is the author of scientific essays on the subject of administrative law, regulatory and administrative simplification, administrative process.

From 18 April 2005 to 28 November 2011 he was Secretary General of the "Authority of the Guarantor for the protection of personal data" and on 15 December 2009 he was also appointed as member of the Independent Commission for Evaluation, Transparency and Integrity of Public Administrations (CiVIT).

From 29 November 2011 to 28 April 2013 he served as Minister of Public Administration in the Monti Cabinet, while from 28 April 2013 to 22 February 2014 he served as Secretary of the Council of Ministers in the Letta Cabinet. From September 2018 to January 2022 he has been president of Italian Council of State.

== Honours and awards ==
- Italy: Knight Grand Cross of the Order of Merit of the Italian Republic (2013)
- Italy: Grand Officer of the Order of Merit of the Italian Republic (2005)
- Italy: Commander of the Order of Merit of the Italian Republic (1991)
