= Ciriani =

Ciriani is a surname. Notable people with the surname include:

- Alessandro Ciriani (born 1970), Italian politician
- Henri Ciriani (1936–2025), Peruvian architect and teacher
- Luca Ciriani (born 1967), Italian politician
