= AccessiWay =

European digital accessibility company founded in 2021

Accessiway
- Type: Private
- Industry: Web accessibility, Technology
- Founded: 2021
- Founders: Eldad Barnoon, Gianni Vernetti, Amit Borsok
- Headquarters: Turin, Italy
- Number of locations: 4 offices (Italy, France, Austria, Germany)
- Area served: Europe
- Key people: Amit Borsok (CEO)
- Products: accessWidget, accessScan, Accessibility Audits, Training Services
- Number of employees: 120+
- Parent: team.blue (since 2024)
- Website: www.accessiway.com

Accessiway is a digital accessibility company based in Turin, Italy, that helps organizations make websites, web applications and mobile apps usable by people with disabilities. Its work centers on compliance with European and national accessibility rules, including the European Accessibility Act.

== History ==
Accessiway was founded in Italy in 2021 by Eldad Barnoon, Gianni Vernetti, and Amit Borsok. The company focuses on users with visual, auditory, motor, or cognitive impairments.

In September 2024, the company was recognized for entering LinkedIn's Top 10 Startups of 2024.

=== Recognition ===
Accessiway has expanded to serve more than 1,500 clients across 20 countries. The company's clients include ING, UnipolSai, Allianz, Intesa San Paolo, Barilla, AXA, Dolce & Gabbana, Lavazza, BPER, and Mediobanca, Q8.

=== Acquisition by team.blue ===
On December 10, 2024, team.blue, a European digital enabler, announced the acquisition of a majority stake in Accessiway. The acquisition was advised by DLA Piper. This transaction made Accessiway part of a bigger digital compliance network serving over 3.3 million customers across Europe.

== Products and services ==
Accessiway offers a range of digital accessibility solutions:

=== Accessiway Platform ===
Accessiway's platform is a web-based software developed by Accessiway to support organizations in managing, monitoring, and remediating the accessibility of their digital touchpoints. The platform centralizes accessibility data across websites and digital properties, providing a structured overview of compliance status, identified issues, and remediation progress over time. It includes integrated remediation workflows that enable teams to assign, track, and resolve accessibility issues, ensuring a coordinated path toward compliance.

=== Accessibility Widget ===
A web accessibility tool that provides automated adjustments and customizable settings for users with different accessibility needs. It is marketed as a supplementary tool to support accessibility efforts, not as a standalone compliance solution.

=== Accessibility Scan ===
A free accessibility validator that uses artificial intelligence to provide comprehensive accessibility reports for websites.

=== Assessment and Training Services ===
Accessiway provides services designed to enable high-level compliance and accessibility, in accordance with the European Accessibility Act and the EN 301 549 standard best practices. The company also offers:

- Manual and automated accessibility audits
- User testing with people with disabilities
- Accessibility statement services
- Corporate training programs

== Operations ==
Accessiway operates with a team of over 120 employees representing more than 13 different nationalities. The company maintains offices in four European countries:

- Turin, Italy (headquarters)
- Paris, France
- Vienna, Austria
- Hamburg, Germany

The company serves clients across Italy, France, Austria, and Germany, with plans for further international expansion. By 2025, Accessiway's client base included over 200 public administration bodies and more than 55 companies in the fashion and retail sectors.

== Collaboration with iubenda ==
Following the acquisition by team.blue, Accessiway has developed a strategic collaboration with iubenda, another team.blue company specializing in privacy and compliance solutions. Starting in January 2025, iubenda refers enterprise clients with websites over 1 million pageviews to Accessiway for accessibility solutions.

== Regulatory Compliance ==
Accessiway operates within the framework of European accessibility legislation, particularly the European Accessibility Act (EAA), which comes into force in June 2025 and requires many businesses to make their digital services accessible.

The company's work also addresses EN 301 549, the harmonised European standard for ICT accessibility, and WCAG 2.2 AA, commonly used international accessibility guidelines.

National regulations relevant to Accessiway's work include:

- Italy: Legge Stanca (Law 4/2004) and AGID guidelines
- France: Référentiel Général d'Amélioration de l'Accessibilité (RGAA)
- Germany: Barrierefreiheitsstärkungsgesetz (BFSG) and BITV 2.0
- Austria: Behindertengleichstellungsgesetz (BGG)

== Advocacy and Public Engagement ==
Accessiway is an active member of the Interparliamentary Group on Digital Accessibility, contributing to policy discussions at the European level.

In June 2025, ahead of the European Accessibility Act's entry into force on June 28, Accessiway participated in institutional events promoting digital accessibility awareness. The company organized an event in Milan in collaboration with the President of the European Parliament (Office in Italy), and AGID (Agenzia per l'Italia Digitale), focusing on the implementation of digital accessibility standards.

CEO Amit Borsok has been featured in international media outlets discussing digital accessibility, including a June 2025 article in Forbes about the implications of the European Accessibility Act deadline for brands.

== Mission and Community Engagement ==
=== Mission and Impact ===
Accessiway focuses exclusively on digital accessibility. The company's mission is to make the web accessible for people with disabilities by helping companies see compliance as an opportunity and not just a legal requirement.

The company's work addresses a significant need: approximately 101 million Europeans have some form of disability, and nearly a quarter (23.9%) of people aged 16 years or over in the EU had a disability in 2024. In 2024, 82.3% of EU residents with severe disabilities used the internet in the past year, versus 95.2% of those without disabilities, a gap Accessiway aims to close.

=== Collaboration with NGOs and Disability Organizations ===
Accessiway partners with users with disabilities and disability organizations to understand their needs. This feedback shapes the company's products and services.

The company has been a sponsor of Disability Pride Turin, an annual disability rights event. Accessiway participated in the 2023 Global Accessibility Awareness Day celebrations in conjunction with the Disability Pride event.

=== ESG and Corporate Social Responsibility ===
The company is part of team.blue's ESG strategy, outlined in its "blue.shift" Impact Report. team.blue is building a volunteering program based on Accessiway's model of working with accessibility-focused NGOs. Employees will get paid volunteer time, and all activities will include disability inclusion support.

team.blue positions Accessiway as a key part of its accessibility efforts across Europe.
