= Andrea Abodi =

Italian politician and business executive

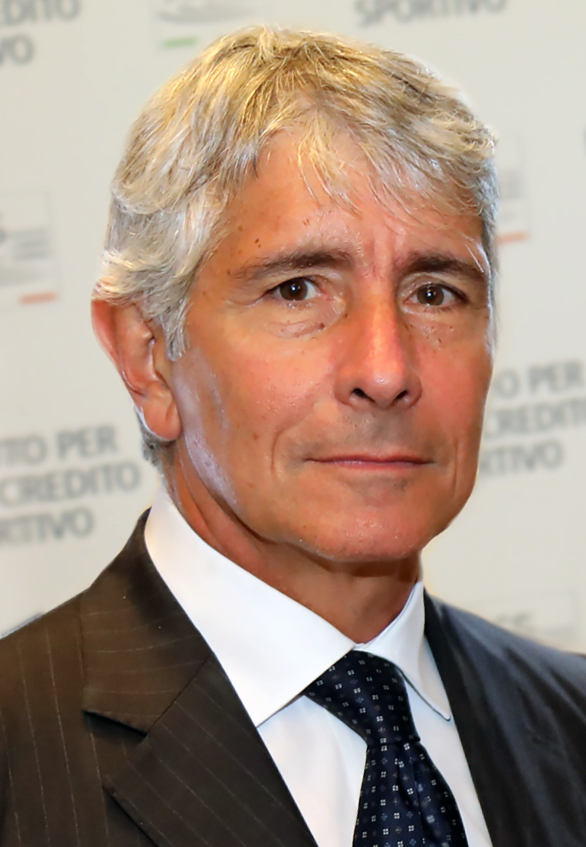
- Abodi in 2018

Minister for Sport and Youth
- Incumbent
- Assumed office 22 October 2022
- Prime Minister: Giorgia Meloni
- Preceded by: Fabiana Dadone (Youth); Vincenzo Spadafora (Sport, 2021)

Personal details
- Born: March 7, 1960 (age 66) Rome, Italy
- Party: Independent
- Education: LUISS University

Andrea Abodi (born 7 March 1960) is an Italian politician and business executive, since 22 October 2022 he has been Minister for Sport and Youth in the Meloni government.

== Biography ==
He graduated from LUISS in economics and commerce, specializing in the industrial management of sport and in the development of sport marketing activities.

In 1986, he enrolled in the list of publicists of the Order of Journalists of Lazio (local journalist trade union).

=== Managerial career ===
He began his managerial career in 1987, holding until 1994 the role of marketing director of the Italian branch of the US multinational IMG - International Management Group, leader in the organization and management of events, rights and sports talents.

From 1990 to 1994, he was also responsible for Italy of TWI — Trans World International (today IMG Media), a company that operates in the international production and distribution of audiovisual sports and cultural content.

In 1994 he co-founded Media Partners Group, an Italian multinational leader in the sports industry, then acquired by the Infront Group, in which he held the position of Executive Vice President until 2002.

Between 2003 and 2006 he held the position of President of the Azienda Strade Lazio SpA and Arcea Lazio SpA, companies operating in the road and motorway infrastructure sector.

=== Managerial career in the sports world ===
From 2002 to 2008, he was a director of CONI Servizi spa. In 2009 he led, as executive vice president and general manager, the Organizing Committee of the finals of the World Baseball Championships; he then coordinated the marketing activities for Rome's candidacy for the 2004 Summer Olympic and Paralympic Games, also participating in the activities of the Organizing Committee for those of 2020.

With the decree of 26 October 2021 of the Minister of Tourism, he was designated a member of the Permanent Committee for the promotion of tourism in Italy. Furthermore, with the decree of 26 January 2022 he was appointed by the Minister of Tourism as a member of the National Tourism Observatory for a term of three years. In the same period he was a member of the Special Funds Management Committee as well as a Director of the Italian Banking Association, which he joined for the 2020–2022 term before being renewed for another two-year appointment.
