= Paola Pisano =

Italian academic and politician

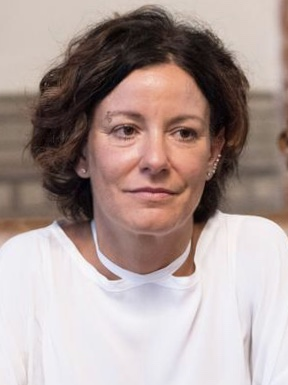

Minister for Technological Innovation and Digitalisation
- In office 5 September 2019 – 13 February 2021
- Prime Minister: Giuseppe Conte
- Preceded by: Lucio Stanca (2006)
- Succeeded by: Vittorio Colao

Personal details
- Born: 4 January 1977 (age 49) Turin, Piedmont, Italy
- Party: Five Star Movement
- Education: University of Turin

Paola Pisano (born 4 January 1977) is an Italian academic and politician for the Five Star Movement. In September 2019, she was appointed Minister for Technological Innovation in the Conte II Cabinet.

== Biography ==
City Council member (Assessor) in charge of Innovation in the Turin constituency and university researcher in charge of Innovation Management at the University of Turin.

She has been the President of the Company Commission of the IT department at the University of Turin and the Director of the Centre for Multidisciplinary Technological Innovation at the same Ateneum. (IcxT).

Visiting Professor at Westminster University and consultant in several projects involving corporate innovation.

In 2018 she was nominated ‘The most influential woman in the digital industry’ by magazine Digitalic Mag.

In spring 2019 she declined to be the leading candidate for the 5 Star Movement (Movimento 5 Stelle) at the European Elections to keep her position of City Council member (Assessor) under Mayor of Turin Chiara Appendino and therefore to continue working on the projects already started in that constituency.

=== City Council member (Assessor) in charge of innovation in the Turin constituency (2017–2019) ===
During her mandate as City Council member (Assessor) in charge of digital development in the Turin constituency, she kickstarted the testing of self-driving cars, launching also the first self-driving bus service. She incentivized companies in joining the testing of high-financial-risk hi-tech products in the city of Turin through the Torino City Lab project.

During her mandate she was also involved in the digitalization of public services, launching the portal Torino Facile. For the first time ever, the historic centre hosted two shows featuring several drones.

=== Minister of Technological Innovation and Digitalization (2019–2021) ===
On 5 September 2019 she was appointed as Minister of Technological Innovation and Digitalization in the Conte II Cabinet.

On 17 December 2019 she unveiled in Rome the Digital Republic Manifesto (Manifesto della Repubblica Digitale) with the objective of relaunching digital identity and domicile, revamping traditional manufacturing sectors, achieving inclusive and sustainable development.

"What we offer is a shared vision, able to address the Country towards a technological and digital transformation, which involves three challenges: digitalization, innovation, ethical and sustainable development.”

A supporter of technologies developed through ethical, inclusive, transparent means, in full respect of civil rights, on 18 February 2020 she signed a Memorandum of Understanding with Fondazione Leonardo to outline the ethical and juridical context within which to develop and apply artificial intelligence, especially to meet the public administration needs of the City council.

She signed on behalf of the Italian Government the ‘Call for Ethics’ by the Pontifical Academy for Life for the development of Artificial Intelligence, together with Microsoft, IBM, UN Food and Agricultural Organization.

In March 2020, to reduce the socio-economic impact of the Coronavirus pandemic, she became the driving force behind a project promoting digital solidarity, through which she invited both individuals and public figures to share services, competencies and energy to support Italy's students and workers.

== Work ==
=== Academic publications ===
- Magazine article. Papa, Armando, Mital, Monika, Pisano, Paola, Del Giudice, Manlio (2018). E-health and wellbeing monitoring using smart healthcare devices: An empirical investigation. TECHNOLOGICAL FORECASTING AND SOCIAL CHANGE, p. 1–10, ISSN 0040-1625, doi: 10.1016/j.techfore.2018.02.018
- Magazine article. Dezi, Luca, Pisano, Paola, Pironti, Marco, Papa, Armando (2018). Unpacking open innovation neighbourhoods: le milieu of the lean smart city. MANAGEMENT DECISION, p. 1–24, ISSN 0025-1747, doi: 10.1108/MD-04-2017-0407
- Magazine article. Kapetaniou, Chrystalla, Rieple, Alison, Pilkington, Alan, Frandsen, Thomas, Pisano, Paola (2017). Building the layers of a new manufacturing taxonomy: How 3D printing is creating a new landscape of production eco-systems and competitive dynamics.
- Technological Forecasting And Social Change, vol. 128, p. 22–35, ISSN 0040-1625, doi: 10.1016/j.techfore.2017.10.011
- Volume contribution (Chapter or Essay). Pisano Paola, Pironti Marco, Rieple Alison (2016). The changing role of the designer in new business models based around 3D printing technologies.
- In: Robert DeFillippi Alison Rieple Patrik Wikström. International Perspectives on Business Innovation and Disruption in Design. p. 60–74, CHELTENHAM: Edward Elgar Publishing Limited, ISBN 9781784716639
- Magazine article. Pisano Paola, Pironti Marco, Rieple Alison (2015). Identify Innovative Business Models: Can Innovative Business Models Enable Players to React to Ongoing or Unpredictable Trends?. ENTREPRENEURSHIP RESEARCH JOURNAL, vol. 5, p. 181–199, ISSN 2157-5665, doi: 10.1515/erj-2014-0032
- Magazine article. Rieple Alison, Pisano Paola (2015). Business Models in a New Digital Culture: The Open Long Tail Model. SYMPHONYA, p. 75–88, ISSN 1593-0319, doi: 10.4468/2015.2.06rieple.pisano
- Magazine article. Rieple Alison, Gander Jonathan, Pisano Paola, Haberberg Adrian (2015). UK Fashion Designers Working in Micro-sized Enterprises; Attitudes to Locational Resources, Their Peers and the Market. INDUSTRY AND INNOVATION, vol. 22, p. 147–164, ISSN 1366-2716, doi: 10.1080/13662716.2015.1035959
- Magazine article. Pisano Paola, Cautela Cabirio, Pironti Marco (2014). Changing customer roles to innovate business models: an overview of design-intensive industries. PICCOLA IMPRESA, p. 55–76, ISSN 0394-7947
- Magazine article. Cabirio Cautela, PISANO, PAOLA, PIRONTI, Marco (2014). The emergence of new networked business models from technology innovation: an analysis of 3-D printing design enterprises. INTERNATIONAL ENTREPRENEURSHIP AND MANAGEMENT JOURNAL, p. 1–15, ISSN 1554-7191, doi: 10.1007/s11365-014-0301-z
- Volume contribution (Chapter or Essay). Paola Pisano, Alison Rieple, Marco Pironti (2014). Strategic approaches. In: Gary Rees Paul E. Smith. Strategic Human Resource Management. p. 30–71, London:SAGE Publications, ISBN 9781446255858
