= List of presidents of the Province of Pordenone =

President of the Province of Pordenone
- Presidente della Provincia di Pordenone
- Inaugural holder: Danilo Pavan
- Formation: 1970
- Final holder: Claudio Pedrotti
- Abolished: 2016

The president of the Province of Pordenone was the head of the provincial administration of Pordenone, a local government authority in Friuli-Venezia Giulia, Italy.

== History ==
The Province of Pordenone was established in 1968, becoming the fourth province of Friuli-Venezia Giulia. The first provincial elections were held in 1970, and Danilo Pavan was elected as the first president. From 1970 until 1995, the president of the province was elected by the Provincial Council. Following the reform of Italian provincial administrations, between 1995 and 2016 the president was elected directly by citizens through popular vote.

The province was abolished as an administrative body on 1 January 2017 as part of the reform of local government in Friuli Venezia Giulia. The abolition process was established by Regional Law no. 20 of 9 December 2016, which provided for the suppression of the provinces and the transfer of their functions to other local authorities. The province was replaced by a Regional Decentralization Entity (Ente di Decentramento Regionale), an administrative body headed by a general director.

The Province of Pordenone is scheduled to be re-established on 1 January 2027, following the reform of the local government system of Friuli-Venezia Giulia which provides for the reintroduction of the provinces.

== List ==
=== President of the Province (1970–2016) ===
No.	Portrait	Name	Term		Party
No.	Portrait	Name	Start	End	Party
		Danilo Pavan	10 August 1970	1975	Christian Democracy
		Giancarlo Rossi	1975	1979	Christian Democracy
		?	?	?	?
		Dario Valvasori	1982	5 August 1985	Italian Socialist Party
		Dario Valvasori	5 August 1985	24 July 1990	Italian Socialist Party
		Dario Valvasori	24 July 1990	12 January 1993	Italian Socialist Party
		Sergio Chiarotto	12 March 1993	8 May 1995	Christian Democracy
		Alberto Rossi	11 May 1995	29 June 1999	Italian People's Party
		Elio De Anna	29 June 1999	30 June 2004	Forza Italia
		Elio De Anna	30 June 2004	13 April 2008	Forza Italia
		Alessandro Ciriani	7 June 2009	26 November 2014	The People of Freedom; Brothers of Italy
		Claudio Pedrotti	26 November 2014	24 June 2016	Democratic Party
–		Loris Toneguzzi	24 June 2016	26 July 2016	Special commissioner
–		Annamaria Pecile	26 July 2016	1 January 2017	Special commissioner

=== Regional Decentralization Entity of Pordenone (2020–present) ===
No.	General director	Term of office	
No.	General director	Start	End
–	Augusto Viola (Extraordinary commissioner)	1 July 2020	2 August 2023
1	Cinzia Cuscela	2 August 2023	Incumbent

== Sources ==
- "Storia amministrativa dell'ente". Ministero dell'Interno.
