= Giuseppe Asquini =

Italian politician (1901–1987)

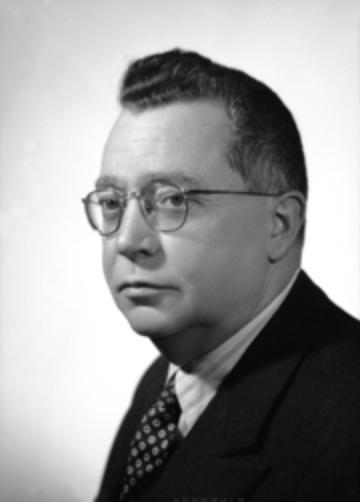

Personal details
- Born: 19 August 1901
- Died: 12 January 1987 (aged 85)

Giuseppe Asquini (19 August 1901 – 12 January 1987) is an Italian politician who served as Mayor of Pordenone (1945–1946) and Senator (1948–1953).

Political offices
Preceded by Enrico Galvani (podestà)	Mayor of Pordenone; 1945–1946	Succeeded by Giuseppe Garlato
