= Draghi government =

67th government of the Italian Republic

- 67th Cabinet of Italy

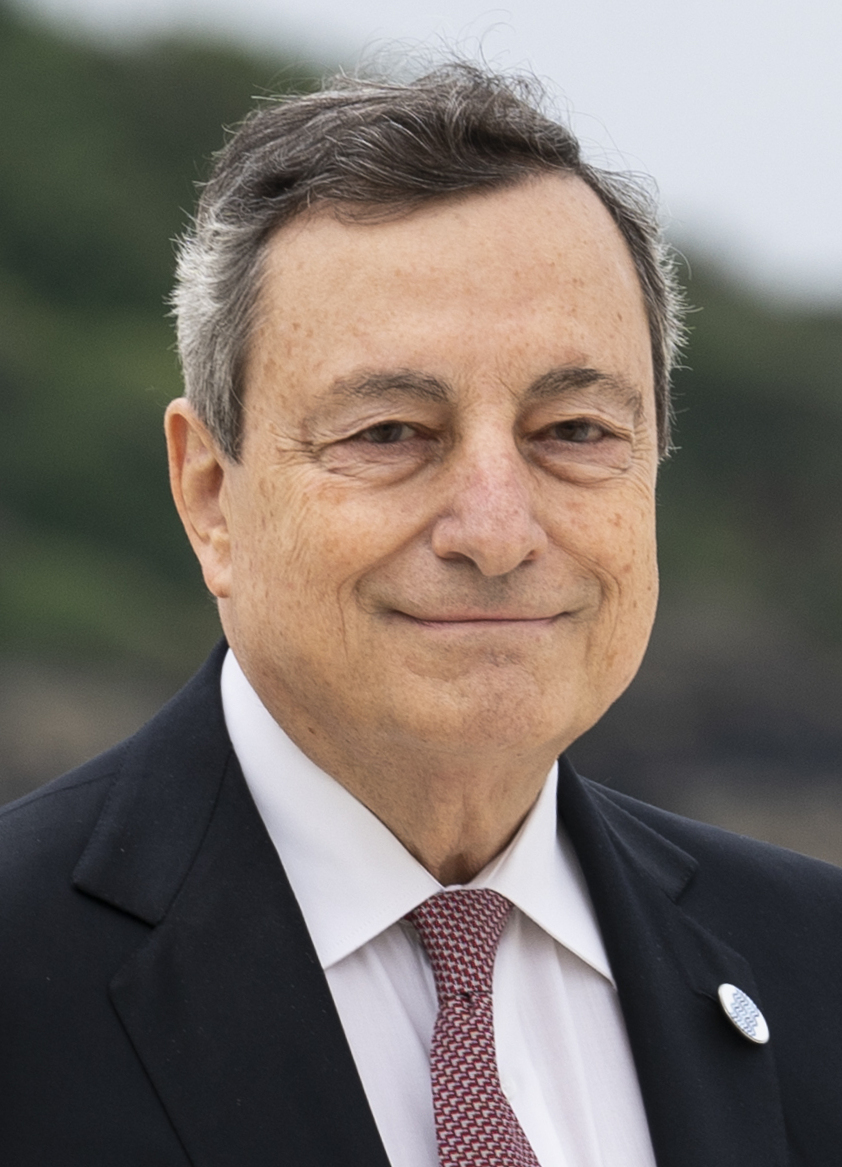
- Date formed: 13 February 2021
- Date dissolved: 22 October 2022 (617 days)

People and organisations
- Head of state: Sergio Mattarella
- Head of government: Mario Draghi
- No. of ministers: 24 (incl. Prime Minister)
- Member parties: Lega; M5S; PD; FI; IpF; IV; Art.1; Az; A2050; CD; NcI; +Eu
- Status in legislature: Supermajority (national unity)
- Opposition parties: FdI; SI; Alt

History
- Incoming formation: 2021 government formation
- Outgoing formation: 2022 government crisis
- Election: 2018 election
- Legislature term: XVIII Legislature (2018–2022)
- Predecessor: Second Conte government
- Successor: Meloni government

The Draghi government was the 67th government of the Italian Republic, led by former President of the European Central Bank, Mario Draghi. It was in office between 13 February 2021 and 22 October 2022.

The Draghi government was formed following the resignation of Prime Minister Giuseppe Conte in the midst of a political crisis which led to the Conte government losing its majority. After consultations with political parties, President Sergio Mattarella tasked Draghi with forming a "high-profile" government. Mattarella stated that the new government would have to face the health, economic and social crises related to the COVID-19 pandemic, as well as overseeing the EU relief fund associated with it. The Draghi government was described as a national unity government by numerous news sources. The choice by Mattarella to appoint Draghi as Prime Minister was welcomed by some international observers, with others casting doubt on the stability of a new technocratic government.

The Draghi Government was formed with both politicians and independent technocrats, and was supported by a large majority of the Italian Parliament, including the anti-establishment Five Star Movement (M5S), the right-wing League (Lega), the centre-right Forza Italia (FI), the centre-left Democratic Party (PD), the centrist Italia Viva (IV), and the leftist Article One (Art.1).

On 21 July 2022, following M5S, Lega and FI's withdrawal of their support to the government, Prime Minister Draghi submitted his resignation. The government continued to operate as a caretaker government until the next government formation following the 2022 Italian general election on 25 September.

== Supporting parties ==
=== Beginning of term ===
At the time of the government formation, its ministers were part of the following parties.

Party	Main ideology	Leader
Five Star Movement (M5S)	Populism	Giuseppe Conte
League (Lega)	Right-wing populism	Matteo Salvini
Democratic Party (PD)	Social democracy	Enrico Letta
Forza Italia (FI)	Liberal conservatism	Silvio Berlusconi
Italia Viva (IV)	Liberalism	Matteo Renzi
Article One (Art.1)	Social democracy	Roberto Speranza

=== End of term ===
After 1 August 2022 the government was composed of the following parties.

Party	Main ideology	Leader
League (Lega)	Right-wing populism	Matteo Salvini
Democratic Party (PD)	Social democracy	Enrico Letta
Five Star Movement (M5S)	Populism	Giuseppe Conte
Action (Az)	Liberalism	Carlo Calenda
Together for the Future (IpF)	Reformism	Luigi Di Maio
Italia Viva (IV)	Liberalism	Matteo Renzi
Article One (Art.1)	Social democracy	Roberto Speranza
Environment 2050 (A2050)	Environmentalism	Federico D'Incà

On 21 June 2022, Luigi Di Maio led a breakaway group outside of the M5S and formed Together for the Future, which confirmed its support for the government. Mariastella Gelmini, Renato Brunetta and Mara Carfagna left FI on 21, 22 and 26 July, respectively. On 29 July, Gelmini and Carfagna joined Action. On 30 July, Federico D'Incà left the M5S, and on 1 August he founded Environment 2050 alongside deputy Davide Crippa.

== History ==
=== Background ===
On 13 January 2021, Italia Viva (IV) withdrew its support for the second Conte government, triggering a political crisis. Conte subsequently won confidence motions in both houses of Parliament, with the abstention of IV, but could only reach a plurality in the Senate, rather than an absolute majority. In the wake of this, Conte tendered his resignation to President Mattarella, who then began a round of discussions with various parties to form a new government.

=== Government formation ===
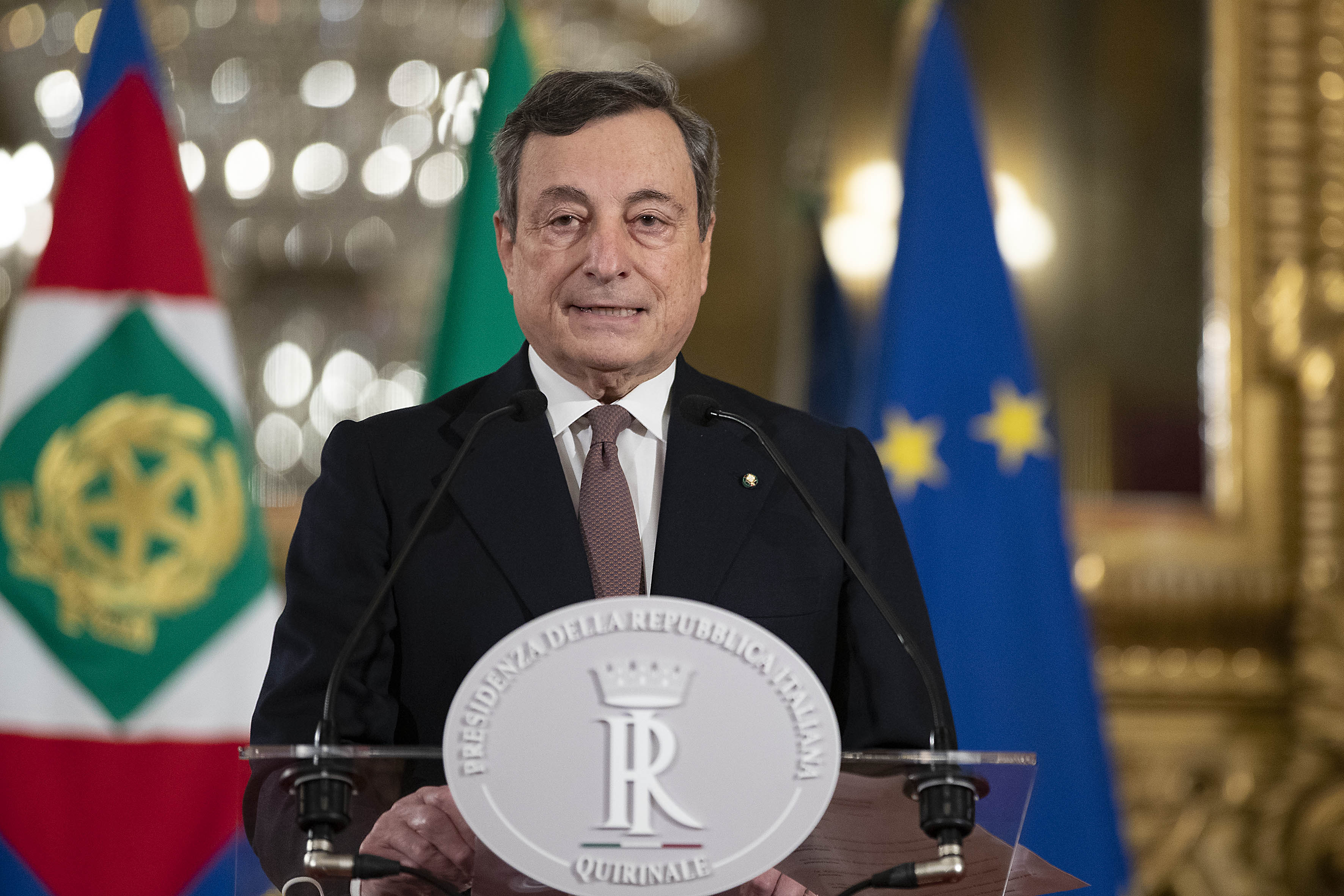
Mario Draghi announcing the Cabinet at the Quirinal Palace.

Mattarella met with delegations of political parties on 28 and 29 January to determine their views on the formation of a new government. The Five Star Movement (M5S), Democratic Party (PD), Free and Equal (LeU), For the Autonomies, Europeanists, and some members of the Mixed Group all expressed support for the reappointment of Conte as Prime Minister, but IV ruled this out. The centre-right and right-wing parties, the League (Lega), Forza Italia (FI) and the Brothers of Italy (FdI), stated that they preferred a snap election, but would be willing to join a national unity government under certain conditions. Following this deadlock, Mattarella asked Roberto Fico, the President of the Chamber of Deputies, to explore the possibility of a grand coalition government. On 2 February, Fico confirmed that there was insufficient support for the proposal.

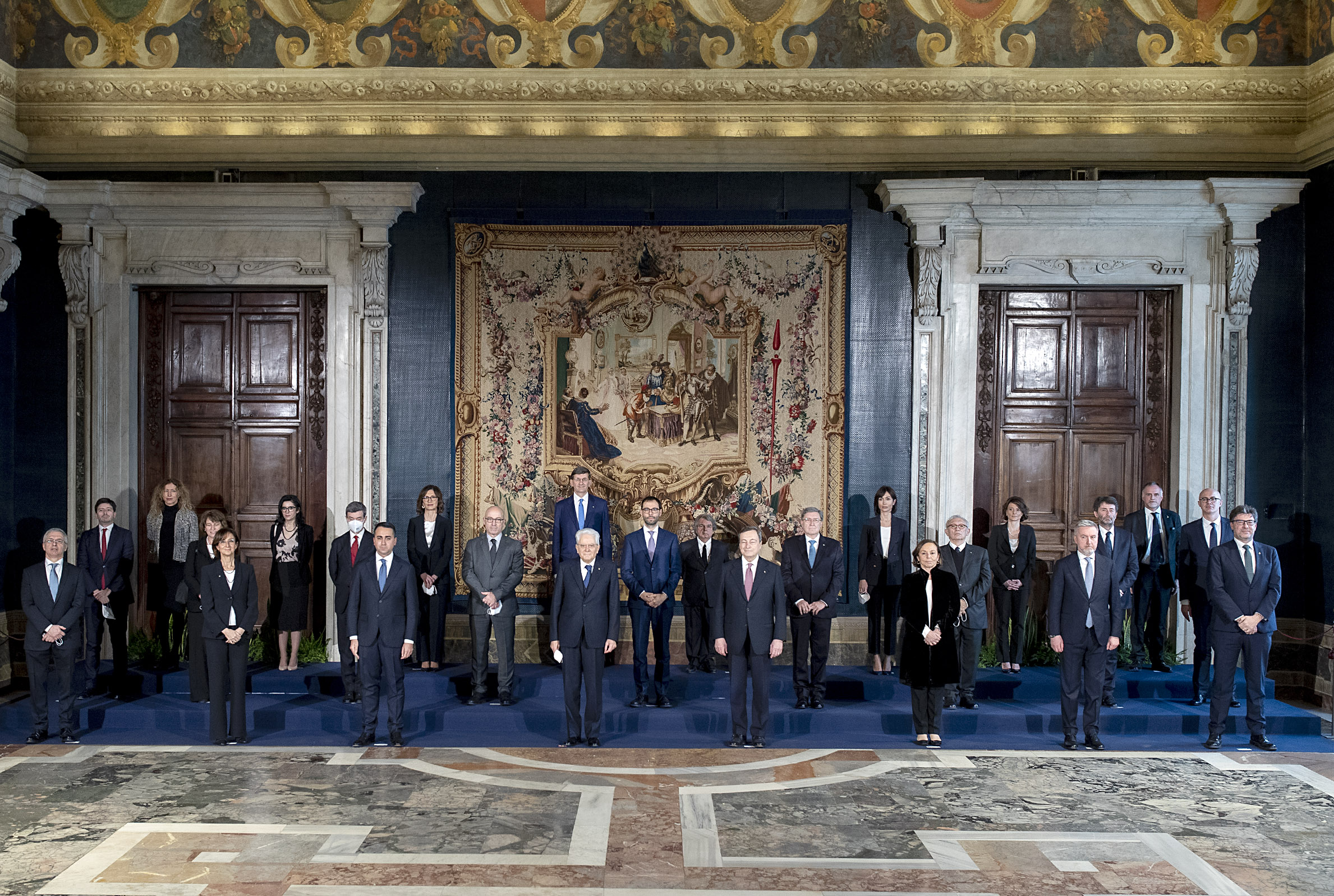
The Draghi government at the Quirinal Palace for the official portrait.

With the prospect of early elections looming, on 3 February Mattarella invited former ECB President Mario Draghi to the Quirinal Palace to charge him to forming a national unity government. Draghi accepted the offer, and began consultations with the leaders of political parties. Conte publicly endorsed him as his successor the following day, and further negotiations commenced. On 10 February, League leader Matteo Salvini and FI leader Silvio Berlusconi jointly announced their support for Draghi. Conversely, FdI leader Giorgia Meloni stated that her party would go into opposition. The PD's national board unanimously voted on 11 February to support Draghi. The same day, the M5S held an online referendum on whether to "support a technical-political government with the other political forces indicated by the appointed prime minister Mario Draghi", which was approved by 59.3%.

Having achieved sufficient support, on 12 February Draghi met with President Mattarella at the Quirinal Palace and presented his list of ministers. The Draghi government was sworn in on the following day, 13 February, at 11:00 AM UTC. The government was composed of twenty-four ministers, eight women and sixteen men, most of them from Northern Italy, largely from Lombardy and Veneto; it contained representatives from all supportive political parties, as well as numerous independent technocrats.

=== Investiture vote ===
On 17 February 2021, the Senate approved the Draghi government with 262 votes in favour, 40 against and 2 abstentions. The following day, the Chamber of Deputies affirmed its support, with 535 votes in favour, 56 against and 5 abstentions. This was the third largest majority garnered by a government in the history of the Italian Republic after the Monti government and after the fourth Andreotti government.

17–18 February 2021 Investiture votes for Draghi Cabinet
House of Parliament	Vote	Parties	Votes
Senate of the Republic (Voting: 302 of 321, Majority: 152)	Yes	M5S (69), Lega–PSd'Az (62), FI–UDC (49), PD (35), IV–PSI (17), Eur–MAIE–CD (10), Aut (5), LeU (4), IdeA–C! (3), +Eu–A (2), Others (6)	262 / 302
Senate of the Republic (Voting: 302 of 321, Majority: 152)	No	FdI (19), M5S (15), LeU / Italian Left (2), Others (4)	40 / 302
Senate of the Republic (Voting: 302 of 321, Majority: 152)	Abstention	Aut (1), Others (1)	2 / 321
Chamber of Deputies (Voting: 591 of 630, Majority: 296)	Yes	M5S (155), Lega (125), PD (91), FI (81), IV (28), CD (14), LeU (11), C! (10), NcI−USEI−AdC (5), SVP–PATT (4), Az–+Eu–RI (4), Eur–MAIE–PSI (2), Others (5)	535 / 591
Chamber of Deputies (Voting: 591 of 630, Majority: 296)	No	FdI (31), M5S (16), Lega (1), LeU / Italian Left (1), Others (7)	56 / 591
Chamber of Deputies (Voting: 591 of 630, Majority: 296)	Abstention	M5S (5)	5 / 630

=== Government crisis and collapse ===
In July 2022, the M5S did not participate to a confidence vote in the Senate on a government bill, the so-called decreto aiuti, regarding a €27 billion economic aid to counteract the energy and economy crisis. Prime Minister Draghi offered his resignation, which was rejected by President Mattarella. After a few days, on 20 July, Draghi spoke to the Senate again, seeking a confidence vote again to secure the government majority supporting his cabinet, while rejecting the proposal put forward by Lega and FI on a new government without the M5S. In that occasion, the M5S, Lega and FI, three major parties which were supporting the Draghi government, withdrew their support. Consequently, Draghi tendered his final resignation to President Mattarella, who dissolved the houses of Parliament, leading to an early election in September 2022, and asked Draghi to stay in office to handle current affairs (as is customary in Italian politics) until a new government could be formed following the upcoming general election.

== Party breakdown ==
=== Beginning of term ===
==== Ministers ====
- Independents
9
- Five Star Movement
4
- League
3
- Democratic Party
3
- Forza Italia
3
- Italia Viva
1
- Article One
1

==== Ministers and other members ====
- Independents: Prime minister, 8 ministers, 3 undersecretaries
- Five Star Movement (M5S): 4 ministers, 2 deputy ministers, 9 undersecretaries
- League (Lega): 3 ministers, 1 deputy minister, 8 undersecretaries
- Democratic Party (PD): 3 ministers, 1 deputy minister, 5 undersecretaries
- Forza Italia (FI): 3 ministers, 1 deputy minister, 5 undersecretaries
- Italia Viva (IV): 1 minister, 1 deputy minister, 1 undersecretary
- Article One (Art.1): 1 minister, 1 undersecretary
- Democratic Centre (CD): 1 undersecretary
- Us with Italy (NcI): 1 undersecretary
- More Europe (+Eu): 1 undersecretary

=== End of term ===
==== Ministers ====
- Independents
10
- League
3
- Democratic Party
3
- Five Star Movement
2
- Action
2
- Together for the Future
1
- Italia Viva
1
- Article One
1
- Environment 2050
1

==== Ministers and other members ====
- Independents: Prime minister, 9 ministers, 2 undersecretaries
- League (Lega): 3 ministers, 1 deputy minister, 8 undersecretaries
- Democratic Party (PD): 3 ministers, 1 deputy minister, 5 undersecretaries
- Five Star Movement (M5S): 2 ministers, 1 deputy minister, 5 undersecretaries
- Action (Az): 2 ministers
- Together for the Future (IpF): 1 minister, 1 deputy minister, 4 undersecretaries
- Italia Viva (IV): 1 minister, 1 deputy minister, 1 undersecretary
- Article One (Art.1): 1 minister, 1 undersecretary
- Environment 2050 (A2050): 1 minister
- Forza Italia (FI): 1 deputy minister, 6 undersecretaries
- Democratic Centre (CD): 1 undersecretary
- Us with Italy (NcI): 1 undersecretary
- More Europe (+Eu): 1 undersecretary

== Geographical breakdown ==
A choropleth map showing the number of ministers from each region.

- Northern Italy: 18 ministers
  - Lombardy: 9 ministers
  - Veneto: 4 ministers
  - Emilia-Romagna: 2 ministers
  - Friuli-Venezia Giulia: 1 minister
  - Liguria: 1 minister
  - Piedmont: 1 minister
- Central Italy: 2 ministers (including Draghi)
  - Lazio: 2 ministers (including Draghi)
- Southern and Insular Italy: 4 ministers
  - Basilicata: 2 ministers
  - Campania: 2 ministers

== Council of Ministers ==
The Council of Ministers is composed of the following members:

Office	Name	Party	Term
Prime Minister	Mario Draghi	Independent	2021–2022
Minister of Foreign Affairs	Luigi Di Maio	Five Star Movement / Together for the Future	2021–2022
Minister of the Interior	Luciana Lamorgese	Independent	2021–2022
Minister of Justice	Marta Cartabia	Independent	2021–2022
Minister of Defence	Lorenzo Guerini	Democratic Party	2021–2022
Minister of Economy and Finance	Daniele Franco	Independent	2021–2022
Minister of Economic Development	Giancarlo Giorgetti	League	2021–2022
Minister of Agricultural, Food and Forestry Policies	Stefano Patuanelli	Five Star Movement	2021–2022
Minister for the Ecological Transition (Note: On 26 February 2021, the Ministry of the Environment was renamed Ministry for the Ecological Transition, and its responsibilities were expanded so as to include energy policies.)	Roberto Cingolani	Independent	2021–2022
Minister of Sustainable Infrastructure and Mobility (Note: On 26 February 2021, the Ministry of Infrastructure and Transport was renamed Ministry of Sustainable Infrastructure and Mobility.)	Enrico Giovannini	Independent	2021–2022
Minister of Labour and Social Policies	Andrea Orlando	Democratic Party	2021–2022
Minister of Education	Patrizio Bianchi	Independent	2021–2022
Minister of University and Research	Maria Cristina Messa	Independent	2021–2022
Minister of Culture	Dario Franceschini	Democratic Party	2021–2022
Minister of Health	Roberto Speranza	Article One	2021–2022
Minister of Tourism (Note: The Ministry of Culture was also responsible for tourism in the previous governments. The new Ministry of Tourism has just been established as an independent institution.)	Massimo Garavaglia	League	2021–2022
Minister for Parliamentary Relations	Federico D'Incà	Five Star Movement / Environment 2050	2021–2022
Minister of Public Administration	Renato Brunetta	Forza Italia / Independent	2021–2022
Minister of Regional Affairs and Autonomies	Mariastella Gelmini	Forza Italia / Action	2021–2022
Minister for the South and Territorial Cohesion	Mara Carfagna	Forza Italia / Action	2021–2022
Minister for Equal Opportunities and Family	Elena Bonetti	Italia Viva	2021–2022
Minister for Youth Policies	Fabiana Dadone	Five Star Movement	2021–2022
Minister for Technological Innovation and Digital Transition	Vittorio Colao	Independent	2021–2022
Minister for Disabilities	Erika Stefani	League	2021–2022
Secretary of the Council of Ministers	Roberto Garofoli	Independent	2021–2022

== Composition ==
Office	Portrait	Name	Term of office	Party
Prime Minister		Mario Draghi	13 February 2021 – 22 October 2022	Independent
Prime Minister	Undersecretaries: Vincenzo Amendola (PD) – Delegated to European Affairs; Franco Gabrielli (Ind.) – Delegated to the Authority for the Security of the Republic; Giuseppe Moles (FI) – Delegated to Information and Publishing; Bruno Tabacci (CD) – Delegated to the Coordination of Economic Policy and to Space; Valentina Vezzali (Ind.; after 27 July 2022: FI) – Delegated to Sport (since 16 March 2021)			
Minister of Foreign Affairs		Luigi Di Maio	13 February 2021 – 22 October 2022	Five Star Movement; Before 21 June 2022
Minister of Foreign Affairs		Luigi Di Maio	13 February 2021 – 22 October 2022	Together for the Future; After 21 June 2022
Minister of Foreign Affairs	Deputy Minister: Marina Sereni (PD); Undersecretaries: Benedetto Della Vedova (+Eu); Manlio Di Stefano (M5S; after 21 June 2022: IpF)			
Minister of the Interior		Luciana Lamorgese	13 February 2021 – 22 October 2022	Independent
Minister of the Interior	Undersecretaries: Nicola Molteni (Lega); Ivan Scalfarotto (IV); Carlo Sibilia (M5S)			
Minister of Justice		Marta Cartabia	13 February 2021 – 22 October 2022	Independent
Minister of Justice	Undersecretaries: Anna Macina (M5S; after 21 June 2022: IpF); Francesco Paolo Sisto (FI)			
Minister of Defence		Lorenzo Guerini	13 February 2021 – 22 October 2022	Democratic Party
Minister of Defence	Undersecretaries: Giorgio Mulè (FI); Stefania Pucciarelli (Lega)			
Minister of Economy and Finance		Daniele Franco	13 February 2021 – 22 October 2022	Independent
Minister of Economy and Finance	Deputy Minister: Laura Castelli (M5S; after 21 June 2022: IpF); Undersecretaries: Claudio Durigon (Lega) (until 2 September 2021) (Note: Durigon resigned after tensions within the majority due to his support in renaming a public park of Latina after Arnaldo Mussolini, brother of the fascist dictator Benito Mussolini.); Maria Cecilia Guerra (Art.1); Alessandra Sartore (PD); Federico Freni (Ind.) (from 28 September 2021)			
Minister of Economic Development		Giancarlo Giorgetti	13 February 2021 – 22 October 2022	League
Minister of Economic Development	Deputy Ministers: Gilberto Pichetto Fratin (FI); Alessandra Todde (M5S); Undersecretary: Anna Ascani (PD)			
Minister of Agricultural, Food and Forestry Policies		Stefano Patuanelli	13 February 2021 – 22 October 2022	Five Star Movement
Minister of Agricultural, Food and Forestry Policies	Undersecretaries: Francesco Battistoni (FI); Gian Marco Centinaio (Lega)			
Minister for the Ecological Transition		Roberto Cingolani	13 February 2021 – 22 October 2022	Independent
Minister for the Ecological Transition	Undersecretaries: Ilaria Fontana (M5S); Vannia Gava (Lega)			
Minister of Infrastructure and Sustainable Mobility		Enrico Giovannini	13 February 2021 – 22 October 2022	Independent
Minister of Infrastructure and Sustainable Mobility	Deputy Ministers: Teresa Bellanova (IV); Alessandro Morelli (Lega); Undersecretary: Giancarlo Cancelleri (M5S)			
Minister of Labour and Social Policies		Andrea Orlando	13 February 2021 – 22 October 2022	Democratic Party
Minister of Labour and Social Policies	Undersecretaries: Rossella Accoto (M5S); Tiziana Nisini (Lega)			
Minister of Education		Patrizio Bianchi	13 February 2021 – 22 October 2022	Independent
Minister of Education	Undersecretaries: Barbara Floridia (M5S); Rossano Sasso (Lega)			
Minister of University and Research		Maria Cristina Messa	13 February 2021 – 22 October 2022	Independent
Minister of Culture		Dario Franceschini	13 February 2021 – 22 October 2022	Democratic Party
Minister of Culture	Undersecretary: Lucia Borgonzoni (Lega)			
Minister of Health		Roberto Speranza	13 February 2021 – 22 October 2022	Article One
Minister of Health	Undersecretaries: Andrea Costa (NcI); Pierpaolo Sileri (M5S; after 21 June 2022: IpF)			
Minister of Tourism		Massimo Garavaglia	13 February 2021 – 22 October 2022	League
Minister for Parliamentary Relations (without portfolio)		Federico D'Incà	13 February 2021 – 22 October 2022	Five Star Movement; Before 30 July 2022
Minister for Parliamentary Relations (without portfolio)		Federico D'Incà	13 February 2021 – 22 October 2022	Environment 2050; After 30 July 2022
Minister for Parliamentary Relations (without portfolio)	Undersecretaries: Deborah Bergamini (FI); Simona Malpezzi (PD) (until 25 March 2021); Caterina Bini (PD) (since 31 March 2021)			
Minister of Public Administration (without portfolio)		Renato Brunetta	13 February 2021 – 22 October 2022	Forza Italia; Before 21 July 2022
Minister of Public Administration (without portfolio)		Renato Brunetta	13 February 2021 – 22 October 2022	Independent; After 21 July 2022
Minister of Regional Affairs and Autonomies (without portfolio)		Mariastella Gelmini	13 February 2021 – 22 October 2022	Forza Italia; Before 20 July 2022
Minister of Regional Affairs and Autonomies (without portfolio)		Mariastella Gelmini	13 February 2021 – 22 October 2022	Action; After 20 July 2022
Minister for the South and Territorial Cohesion (without portfolio)		Mara Carfagna	13 February 2021 – 22 October 2022	Forza Italia; Before 26 July 2022
Minister for the South and Territorial Cohesion (without portfolio)		Mara Carfagna	13 February 2021 – 22 October 2022	Action; After 26 July 2022
Minister for the South and Territorial Cohesion (without portfolio)	Undersecretary: Dalila Nesci (M5S; after 21 June 2022: IpF)			
Minister for Family and Equal Opportunities (without portfolio)		Elena Bonetti	13 February 2021 – 22 October 2022	Italia Viva
Minister for Youth Policies (without portfolio)		Fabiana Dadone	13 February 2021 – 22 October 2022	Five Star Movement
Minister for Technological Innovation and Digital Transition (without portfolio)		Vittorio Colao	13 February 2021 – 22 October 2022	Independent
Minister for Technological Innovation and Digital Transition (without portfolio)	Undersecretary: Assuntela Messina (PD)			
Minister for Disabilities (without portfolio)		Erika Stefani	13 February 2021 – 22 October 2022	League
Secretary of the Council of Ministers		Roberto Garofoli	13 February 2021 – 22 October 2022	Independent
