= Vittorio Colao =

Italian businessman (born 1961)

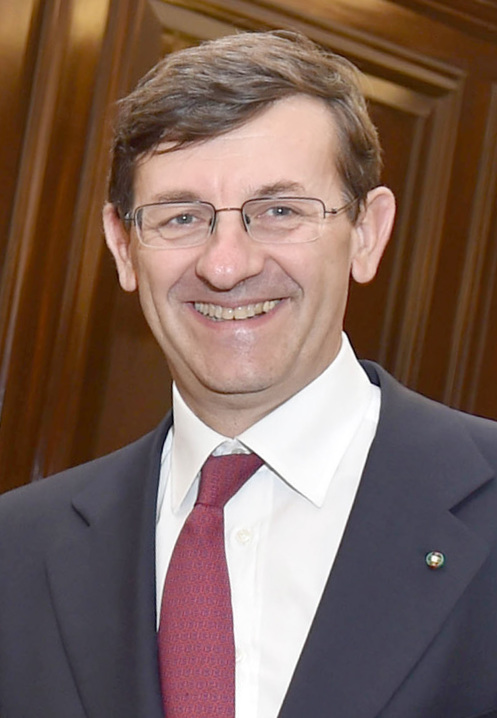

Minister for Technological Innovation and Digital Transition
- In office 13 February 2021 – 22 October 2022
- Prime Minister: Mario Draghi
- Preceded by: Paola Pisano
- Succeeded by: Office abolished

CEO of Vodafone
- In office July 2008 – October 2018
- Preceded by: Arun Sarin
- Succeeded by: Nick Read

Personal details
- Born: 3 October 1961 (age 64) Brescia, Lombardy, Italy
- Spouse: Married 1992
- Children: 2
- Education: Bocconi University; Harvard University
- Known for: Omnitel Pronto Italia COO; RCS MediaGroup CEO; Vodafone CEO

Vittorio Amedeo Colao (born 3 October 1961) is an Italian manager who served as Minister for Technological Innovation and Digital Transition in the government of Prime Minister Mario Draghi from 2021 to 2022. From 2008 until 2018, he was the chief executive officer at Vodafone Group.

== Early life ==
The son of an officer in the Carabinieri, Colao was born in Brescia. He received a business economics degree from Bocconi University and an MBA from the Harvard Business School.

== Career in the private sector ==
Colao started his career at investment bank Morgan Stanley in London. He joined the Milan office of McKinsey & Co in 1986, where as a Partner he worked on media, telecommunications and industrial goods sectors and was responsible for office recruitment.

In 1996 Colao joined Omnitel Pronto Italia, rising to chief operating officer before its take over to become Vodafone Italy. He became regional CEO, Southern Europe in 2001 and joined the main board in 2002. After missing out on the CEO's job, taken by his friend Arun Sarin, and having a purchase of a Bulgarian mobile company blocked, he left Vodafone for Italian publishing company RCS MediaGroup, where he became CEO in July 2004.

After shareholder criticism of the publishing group's strategy and governance, he resigned from RCS MediaGroup following the company's board meeting in September, rejoining Vodafone in October 2006 as CEO Europe and succeeding Sir Julian Horn-Smith as deputy CEO.

Commenting to the Italian press in 2007 that he had no interest in taking the CEO's job at Telecom Italia, Colao succeeded Vodafone CEO Arun Sarin on 29 July 2008. During his time in office, Vodafone sold out of the United States with a $130 billion exit from a joint venture with Verizon and bought the German and eastern European cable networks of Liberty Global for $18 billion (turning Vodafone into Europe's largest broadband provider).

In May 2018, Colao announced that he would step down as Vodafone CEO effective October 2018, and was succeeded by the finance director Nick Read. In July 2019, he became a special adviser of General Atlantic.

In 2024 he received an Honorary Doctorate of Laws from the University of Bath.

== Political career ==
In April 2020, Colao was appointed by the Italian government led by Giuseppe Conte as the leader of a special task force to handle the 'Phase 2' of the emergency for the COVID-19 pandemic. He submitted a proposed plan in June 2020 that was largely ignored by the government.

In February 2021, he was appointed Minister of Technological Innovation and Digital Transition in Mario Draghi's government.

== Other activities ==
=== Corporate boards ===
- General Atlantic, Senior Advisor (since 2019)
- Verizon, Member of the Board of Directors (since 2019)
- Unilever, Non-Executive Member of the Board of Directors (since 2015)

=== Non-profit organizations ===
- Bocconi University, Member of the International Advisory Council
- European Round Table of Industrialists (ERT), Member

== Personal life ==
Colao has been married since 1992. His wife and two children reside with him in South Kensington, Greater London. Colao is a reserve officer in the Carabinieri.
