= Claudio Pedrotti =

Italian politician and engineer (born 1950)

Mayor of Pordenone
- In office 31 May 2011 – 20 June 2016
- Preceded by: Sergio Bolzonello
- Succeeded by: Alessandro Ciriani

President of the Province of Pordenone
- In office 26 November 2014 – 20 June 2016
- Preceded by: Alessandro Ciriani
- Succeeded by: Office abolished

Personal details
- Born: 22 July 1950 (age 76) Bolzano, Italy
- Party: Democratic Party
- Education: University of Padua
- Occupation: Electronic engineer

Claudio Pedrotti (born 22 July 1950) is an Italian politician and electronic engineer who served as mayor of Pordenone from 2011 to 2016 and as president of the Province of Pordenone from 2014 to 2016.

== Life and career ==
Pedrotti was born in Bolzano in 1950 and graduated in electronic engineering from the University of Padua in 1975. He moved to Pordenone in 1979, when he began working for Electrolux. From 1987 to 1990, he was responsible for automation and management systems at the company's automated plant in Porcia.

Pedrotti entered politics in 2011, when he was elected mayor of Pordenone as the Democratic Party candidate. He was supported by a centre-left coalition and won the runoff election on 29 May 2011 with 59.64% of the vote. In November 2014, Pedrotti became president of the Province of Pordenone, succeeding Alessandro Ciriani.
