= Riccardo Fraccaro =

Italian politician

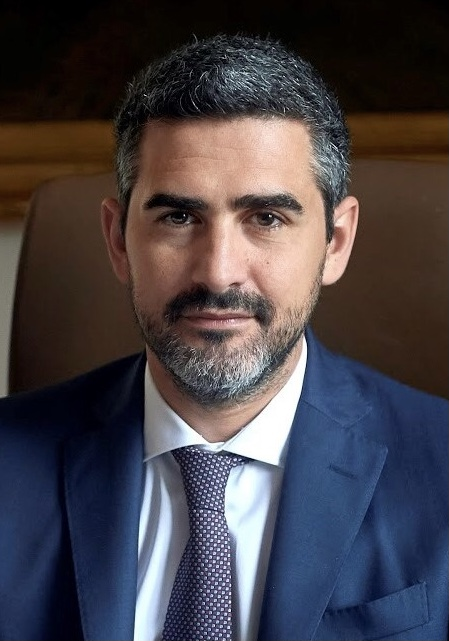

Secretary of the Council of Ministers
- In office 5 September 2019 – 13 February 2021
- Prime Minister: Giuseppe Conte
- Preceded by: Giancarlo Giorgetti
- Succeeded by: Roberto Garofoli

Minister for Parliamentary Relations and Direct Democracy
- In office 1 June 2018 – 5 September 2019
- Prime Minister: Giuseppe Conte
- Preceded by: Anna Finocchiaro
- Succeeded by: Federico D'Incà

Member of the Chamber of Deputies
- In office 15 March 2013 – 13 October 2022
- Constituency: Trentino-Alto Adige

Personal details
- Born: 13 January 1981 (age 45) Montebelluna, Italy
- Party: Five Star Movement
- Education: University of Trento

Riccardo Fraccaro (born 13 January 1981) is an Italian politician, who served in the government of Italy as Minister for Parliamentary Relations and Direct Democracy in Giuseppe Conte's first cabinet.

He served as Secretary of the Council of Ministers of Italy from 5 September 2019 to 13 February 2021.

== Early life and education ==
Fraccaro was born in Montebelluna on 13 January 1981. He holds a bachelor's degree in international environmental law from the University of Trento in 2011.

He worked as an employee of an energy company.

== Political career ==
He was elected Deputy for the first time in the 2013 Italian general election; subsequently he was elected secretary of the Bureau of Presidency of the Chamber of Deputies.

In the 2018 general election he was candidate in the uninominal constituency of Pergine Valsugana, but he placed third. He was nevertheless elected Deputy in the plurinominal constituency of Trentino-Alto Adige.

On 1 June 2018 Fraccaro was appointed Minister for Parliamentary Relations and Direct Democracy of the Conte I Cabinet.

In September 2019, Fraccaro was appointed "cabinet undersecretary" (Secretary of the Council of Ministers of Italy) in the Conte II Cabinet, after the failure of Matteo Salvini's vote of non-confidence.

In November 2020, Fraccaro called for the cancellation by the European Central Bank (ECB) of "sovereign bonds bought during the COVID-19 pandemic or perpetually extending their maturity." He also proposed a "green rule" that would exempt "public expenditures related to environmental investment from deficit calculations." Fraccaro said: "The ECB does not have an issue with debt - it can print as much money as it wants."
