= Minister for Parliamentary Relations =

Ministry in the Cabinet of Italy

- Ministro per i Rapporti con il Parlamento

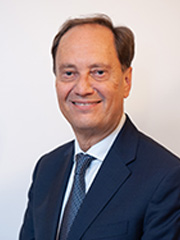
- Incumbent; Luca Ciriani since October 22, 2022
- Department for Parliamentary Relations
- Member of: Council of Ministers
- Seat: Rome
- Appointer: The president of Italy
- Term length: No fixed term
- Formation: February 10, 1954; 72 years ago
- First holder: Raffaele De Caro
- Website: www.rapportiparlamento.gov.it

The minister for parliamentary relations (Italian: ministro per i rapporti con il Parlamento) is one of the positions in the Italian government.

The current minister is Luca Ciriani, who held the office since 22 October 2022.

== List of ministers ==
Parties:

- 1946–1994:
  - Italian Liberal Party
  - Christian Democracy
  - Italian Republican Party
  - Democratic Party of the Left
  - Independent
- 1994–present:
  - Forza Italia / The People of Freedom
  - Democratic Party of the Left
  - Democratic Union for the Republic / Union of Democrats for Europe
  - Italian People's Party
  - Christian Democratic Centre / Union of Christian and Centre Democrats
  - Democratic Party
  - Five Star Movement
  - Brothers of Italy
  - Independent

Coalitions

- 1946–1994:
  - Centrist coalition
  - Organic centre-left
  - Pentapartito / Quadripartito
  - Mixed coalition
- 1994–present:
  - Centre-right coalition
  - Centre-left coalition
  - Mixed coalition

Portrait	Name (Born–Died)	Term of office			Party	Government	Ref.
Portrait	Name (Born–Died)	Took office	Left office	Time in office	Party	Government	Ref.
Minister for Parliamentary Relations
	Raffaele De Caro (1883–1961)	10 February 1954	19 May 1957	3 years, 98 days	Italian Liberal Party	Scelba; Segni I	
	Rinaldo Del Bo (1916–1991)	19 May 1957	16 February 1959	1 year, 273 days	Christian Democracy	Zoli; Fanfani II	
	Giuseppe Bettiol (1907–1982)	16 February 1959	25 March 1960	1 year, 38 days	Christian Democracy	Segni II	
	Armando Angelini (1891–1968)	25 March 1960	26 July 1960	123 days	Christian Democracy	Tambroni	
	Giuseppe Codacci Pisanelli (1913–1988)	26 July 1960	4 December 1963	3 years, 131 days	Christian Democracy	Fanfani III·IV; Leone I	
	Umberto Delle Fave (1912–1986)	4 December 1963	22 July 1964	231 days	Christian Democracy	Moro I	
	Giovanni Battista Scaglia (1910–2006)	22 July 1964	24 June 1968	3 years, 338 days	Christian Democracy	Moro II·III	
	Crescenzo Mazza (1910–1990)	24 June 1968	24 March 1969	273 days	Christian Democracy	Leone II	
	Crescenzo Mazza (1910–1990)	24 June 1968	24 March 1969	273 days	Christian Democracy	Rumor I	
	Carlo Russo (1920–2007)	24 March 1969	27 March 1970	1 year, 3 days	Christian Democracy	Rumor I	
	Carlo Russo (1920–2007)	24 March 1969	27 March 1970	1 year, 3 days	Christian Democracy	Rumor II	
	Mario Ferrari Aggradi (1916–1997)	27 March 1970	6 August 1970	132 days	Christian Democracy	Rumor III	
	Carlo Russo (1920–2007)	6 August 1970	26 June 1972	1 year, 325 days	Christian Democracy	Colombo	
	Carlo Russo (1920–2007)	6 August 1970	26 June 1972	1 year, 325 days	Christian Democracy	Andreotti I	
	Giorgio Bergamasco (1904–1990)	26 June 1972	7 July 1973	1 year, 11 days	Italian Liberal Party	Andreotti II	
	Giovanni Gioia (1925–1981)	7 July 1973	23 November 1974	1 year, 139 days	Christian Democracy	Rumor IV·V	
Office not in use		1974–1979				Moro IV·V; Andreotti III·IV·V	
	Adolfo Sarti (1928–1992)	4 August 1979	14 January 1980	163 days	Christian Democracy	Cossiga I	
	Clelio Darida (1927–2017)	14 January 1980	4 April 1980	81 days	Christian Democracy	Cossiga I	
	Remo Gaspari (1921–2011)	4 April 1980	18 October 1980	197 days	Christian Democracy	Cossiga II	
	Antonio Gava (1930–2008)	18 October 1980	28 June 1981	253 days	Christian Democracy	Forlani	
	Luciano Radi (1922–2014)	28 June 1981	1 December 1982	1 year, 156 days	Christian Democracy	Spadolini I·II	
	Lucio Abis (1926–2014)	1 December 1982	4 August 1983	246 days	Christian Democracy	Fanfani V	
	Oscar Mammì (1926–2017)	4 August 1983	18 April 1987	3 years, 257 days	Italian Republican Party	Craxi I·II	
	Gaetano Gifuni (1932–2018)	18 April 1987	29 July 1987	102 days	Independent	Fanfani VI	
	Sergio Mattarella (1941– )	29 July 1987	22 July 1989	1 year, 358 days	Christian Democracy	Goria; De Mita	
	Egidio Sterpa (1926–2010)	22 July 1989	28 June 1992	3 years, 257 days	Italian Liberal Party	Andreotti VI·VII	
Office not in use		1992–1993				Amato I	
	Augusto Antonio Barbera (1938– )	28 April 1993	4 May 1993	6 days	Democratic Party of the Left	Ciampi	
	Paolo Barile (1917–2000)	14 May 1993	10 May 1994	1 year, 6 days	Independent	Ciampi	
	Giuliano Ferrara (1952– )	10 May 1994	17 January 1995	252 days	Forza Italia	Berlusconi I	
	Guglielmo Negri (1926–2000)	17 January 1995	17 May 1996	1 year, 121 days	Independent	Dini	
Office not in use		1996–1997				Prodi I	
	Giorgio Bogi (1929– )	14 March 1997	21 October 1998	1 year, 221 days	Democratic Party of the Left	Prodi I	
	Gian Guido Folloni (1946– )	21 October 1998	22 December 1999	1 year, 62 days	Democratic Union for the Republic / Union of Democrats for Europe	D'Alema I	
	Agazio Loiero (1940– )	22 December 1999	25 April 2000	125 days	Union of Democrats for Europe	D'Alema II	
	Patrizia Toia (1950– )	25 April 2000	11 June 2001	1 year, 47 days	Italian People's Party	Amato II	
	Carlo Giovanardi (1950– )	11 June 2001	17 May 2006	4 years, 340 days	Christian Democratic Centre / Union of Christians and Centre Democrats	Berlusconi II·III	
Minister for Institutional Reforms and Parliamentary Relations
	Vannino Chiti (1947– )	17 May 2006	8 May 2008	1 year, 357 days	Democrats of the Left / Democratic Party	Prodi II	
Minister for Parliamentary Relations
	Elio Vito (1960– )	8 May 2008	16 November 2011	3 years, 192 days	The People of Freedom	Berlusconi IV	
	Dino Piero Giarda (1936– )	16 November 2011	28 April 2013	1 year, 163 days	Independent	Monti	
	Dario Franceschini (1958– )	28 April 2013	22 February 2014	300 days	Democratic Party	Letta	
Minister for Constitutional Reforms and Parliamentary Relations
	Maria Elena Boschi (1981– )	22 February 2014	12 December 2016	2 years, 294 days	Democratic Party	Renzi	
Minister for Parliamentary Relations
	Anna Finocchiaro (1955– )	12 December 2016	1 June 2018	1 year, 171 days	Democratic Party	Gentiloni	
Minister for Parliamentary Relations and Direct Democracy
	Riccardo Fraccaro (1981–)	1 June 2018	5 September 2019	1 year, 96 days	Five Star Movement	Conte I	
Minister for Parliamentary Relations
	Federico D'Incà (1976–)	5 September 2019	22 October 2022	3 years, 47 days	Five Star Movement / Environment 2050	Conte II; Draghi	
	Luca Ciriani (1967– )	22 October 2022	Incumbent	3 years, 320 days	Brothers of Italy	Meloni	
