= Maria Cristina Messa =

Italian doctor, academic and politician

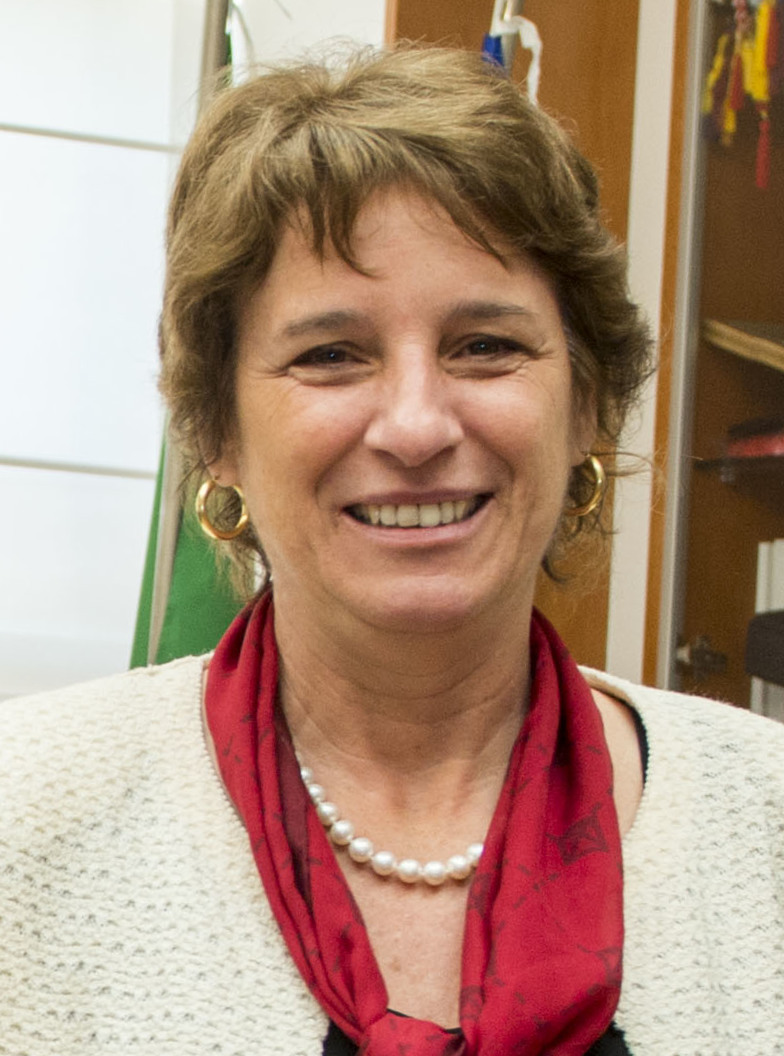

Minister of University and Research
- In office 13 February 2021 – 22 October 2022
- Prime Minister: Mario Draghi
- Preceded by: Gaetano Manfredi
- Succeeded by: Anna Maria Bernini

Personal details
- Born: 8 October 1961 (age 64) Monza, Lombardy, Italy
- Party: Independent
- Education: University of Milan

Maria Cristina Messa (born 8 October 1961) is an Italian doctor and academic, Minister of University and Research in the government of Mario Draghi.

== Biography ==
=== Early and personal life ===
Born in Monza, she grew up in Milan, in Via Leopardi. She is married to Paolo, a doctor, and has two children.

=== Career ===
Graduated with honours in Medicine and Surgery (1986) with a speciality in Nuclear Medicine (1989) from the University of Milan.

She carried out several periods of study in the United States and England.

After a research experience at San Raffaele in Milan, she became associate professor at the University of Milano-Bicocca in 2001 and full professor in 2013. She was director of the complex operating unit of nuclear medicine at the San Gerardo Hospital in Monza (from 2005 to 2012), of the Molecular Bioimaging Centre (now part of the Technomed Foundation) at the University of Milano-Bicocca, and director of the Department of Health Sciences at the same university (2012–2013).

From 2013 to 2019 she was rector of the Bicocca University, the first woman to hold this position at a Milanese university and the fourth in Italy. As a member of the Council of the Conference of Italian University Rectors (CRUI), she was in charge of Research. As rector, she was president of the first Italian inter-university foundation, U41 (since 2017) and a member of the Coordination Committee of Human Technopole. Among her various institutional positions, she was Vice-President of CNR from 2011 to 2015.

She also had several roles at European level. Since 2013, she was the Italian MIUR delegate in the Horizon 2020 programme. She appears in the Top 2% Scientists list of Stanford University for number of publications and citations, together with about four thousand researchers based in Italy out of the total 159,684 listed.
