= Minister for Technological Innovation =

Ministry in the Cabinet of Italy

The minister for technological innovation and digital transition (Italian: ministro per l'innovazione tecnologica e la transizione digitale) is one of the positions in the government of Italy. The latest officeholder was Vittorio Colao, who served in the cabinet of Mario Draghi.

== List of ministers ==
Parties

- 2001–present:
  - Forza Italia / The People of Freedom
  - Democrats of the Left / Democratic Party
  - Five Star Movement
  - Independent

Governments

- 2001–present:
  - Centre-right coalition
  - Centre-left coalition
  - Mixed coalition

Portrait	Name (Born–Died)	Term of office			Party	Government	Ref.
Portrait	Name (Born–Died)	Took office	Left office	Time in office	Party	Government	Ref.
Minister for Innovation and Technology
	Lucio Stanca (1941– )	11 June 2001	17 May 2006	4 years, 340 days	Forza Italia	Berlusconi II·III	
Minister for Reforms and Administrative Innovations
	Luigi Nicolais (1942–2026)	17 May 2006	8 May 2008	1 year, 357 days	Democrats of the Left / Democratic Party	Prodi II	
Minister of Public Administration and Innovation
	Renato Brunetta (1950– )	8 May 2008	16 November 2011	3 years, 192 days	The People of Freedom	Berlusconi IV	
Office not in use		2011–2019				Monti; Letta	
Office not in use		2011–2019				Renzi; Gentiloni	
Office not in use		2011–2019				Conte I	
Minister for Technological Innovation and Digitalization
	Paola Pisano (1977– )	5 September 2019	13 February 2021	1 year, 161 days	Five Star Movement	Conte II	
Minister for Technological Innovation and Digital Transition
	Vittorio Colao (1961– )	13 February 2021	22 October 2022	1 year, 251 days	Independent	Draghi	
Office not in use		2022–present				Meloni	
