= Gustavo Montini =

Italian politician (1920–2004)

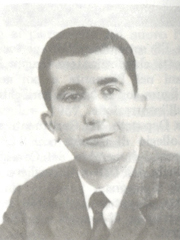
Gustavo Montini

Gustavo Montini (16 September 1920 – 22 September 2004) is an Italian lawyer and politician who served as Mayor of Pordenone (1956–1967), Senator (1968–1976), and Undersecretary of State for Defense in the Andreotti II Cabinet (1972–1973).

Political offices
Preceded by Giuseppe Garlato	Mayor of Pordenone; 1956–1967	Succeeded by Giacomo Ros
