= Minister for Sport (Italy) =

Ministry in the Cabinet of Italy

The minister for sport (Italian: ministro per lo sport) in Italy is one of the positions in the Italian government.

The current minister is Andrea Abodi, an independent, who held the office since 22 October 2022.

== List of ministers ==
Parties

- 2006–present:
  - Democratic Party
  - Five Star Movement
  - Independent

Governments

- 2006–present:
  - Centre-right coalition
  - Centre-left coalition
  - Mixed coalition

Portrait	Name (Born–Died)	Term of office			Party	Government	Ref.
Portrait	Name (Born–Died)	Took office	Left office	Time in office	Party	Government	Ref.
Minister for Youth Policies and Sport
	Giovanna Melandri (1962– )	17 May 2006	8 May 2008	1 year, 357 days	Democrats of the Left / Democratic Party	Prodi II	
Office not in use		2008–2011				Berlusconi IV	
Minister for Tourism, Sport and Regional Affairs
	Piero Gnudi (1938– )	16 November 2011	28 April 2013	1 year, 163 days	Independent	Monti	
Minister for Equal Opportunities, Sport and Youth Policies
	Josefa Idem (1964– )	28 April 2013	27 June 2013	60 days	Democratic Party	Letta	
Office not in use		2013–2016				Renzi	
Minister for Sport
	Luca Lotti (1982– )	12 December 2016	1 June 2018	1 year, 171 days	Democratic Party	Gentiloni	
Office not in use		2018–2019				Conte I	
Minister for Youth Policies and Sport
	Vincenzo Spadafora (1974– )	5 September 2019	13 February 2021	1 year, 161 days	Five Star Movement	Conte II	
Office not in use		2021–2022				Draghi	
Minister for Sport and Youth
	Andrea Abodi (1960– )	22 October 2022	Incumbent	2 years, 219 days	Independent	Meloni	
