= Alfredo Mantovano =

Italian politician and magistrate

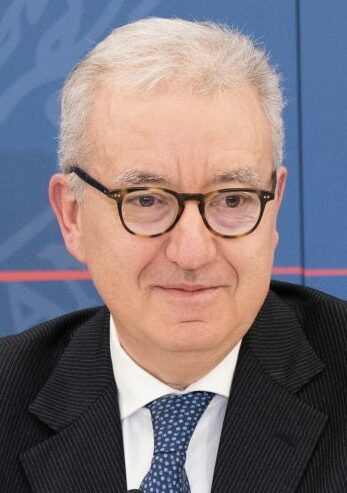
- Mantovano in 2022

Secretary of the Council of Ministers
- Incumbent
- Assumed office 23 October 2022
- Prime Minister: Giorgia Meloni
- Preceded by: Roberto Garofoli

Member of the Chamber of Deputies
- In office 29 April 2008 – 14 March 2013
- In office 9 May 1996 – 27 April 2006
- Constituency: Apulia

Member of the Senate of the Republic
- In office 27 April 2006 – 29 April 2008
- Constituency: Apulia

Personal details
- Born: 14 January 1958 (age 68) Lecce, Italy
- Party: AN (1996–2009); PdL (2009–2013); Independent (since 2013)
- Education: Sapienza University of Rome
- Profession: Politician, Magistrate

Alfredo Mantovano (born 14 January 1958) is an Italian politician and magistrate.

== Biography ==
Born in Lecce on 14 January 1958, he graduated in law at the Sapienza University of Rome in 1981. In 1983 he began his career as a magistrate.

He has been a journalist since 1984 and collaborates with the weekly Tempi and with various other newspapers.

From 2015 to 2022 he was president of the Italian section of the pontifical foundation Aid to the Church in Need, which deals with religious persecution.

== Political career ==
In 1996, Mantovano was elected for the first time to the Italian Parliament and joined the National Alliance. He was also re-elected in 2001, 2006 and 2008.

In the XIV legislature (2001–2006), he held the position of undersecretary at the Ministry of the Interior in the Berlusconi governments. He was again appointed Undersecretary of the Interior in the Fourth Berlusconi government, from 2008 to 2011.

In December 2012, Mantovano, together with other MPs of the People of Freedom, voted the confidence to the Monti government, which Berlusconi had instead withdrawn his support. At the end of the Legislature, he decided not to stand as a candidate in the 2013 general elections, and resumed his career as a magistrate.

On 23 October 2022 he was appointed Undersecretary of State to the Presidency of the Council of Ministers in the Meloni government. Mantovano was also delegated to the Authority for the Security of the Republic.
