= Giancarlo Rossi (politician) =

Italian politician (1925–2013)

Mayor of Pordenone
- In office 1979–1983
- Preceded by: Glauco Moro
- Succeeded by: Alvaro Cardin

President of the Province of Pordenone
- In office 1975–1979
- Preceded by: Danilo Pavan

Personal details
- Born: 26 February 1925 Correggio, Province of Reggio Emilia, Kingdom of Italy
- Died: 17 July 2013 (aged 88) San Colombano al Lambro, Lombardy, Italy
- Party: Christian Democracy
- Occupation: Public official

Giancarlo Rossi (26 February 1925 – 17 July 2013) was an Italian politician who served as mayor of Pordenone from 1979 to 1983 and as president of the Province of Pordenone from 1975 to 1979.

== Life and career ==
Rossi was born in Correggio, the province of Reggio Emilia, in 1925. His brother was killed by Fascists in 1944 in the church of Rio Saliceto.

He moved to Friuli in 1952, where he worked as municipal secretary in Clauzetto and later in Morsano al Tagliamento. He subsequently specialized in administrative law at the University of Trieste and was assigned to the local government office in Udine.

A member of Christian Democracy, Rossi became president of the Province of Pordenone in 1975. He led the provincial administration during the 1976 Friuli earthquake and the subsequent reconstruction. From 1979 to 1983, he served as mayor of Pordenone.

After leaving politics, Rossi devoted himself primarily to voluntary work. He founded the AIFA (Italian Association of the Elderly) and became an active member of the local Italian Red Cross.

Rossi died in San Colombano al Lambro on 17 July 2013, aged 88.
