= Alessandro Ciriani =

Italian politician

Alessandro Ciriani MEP
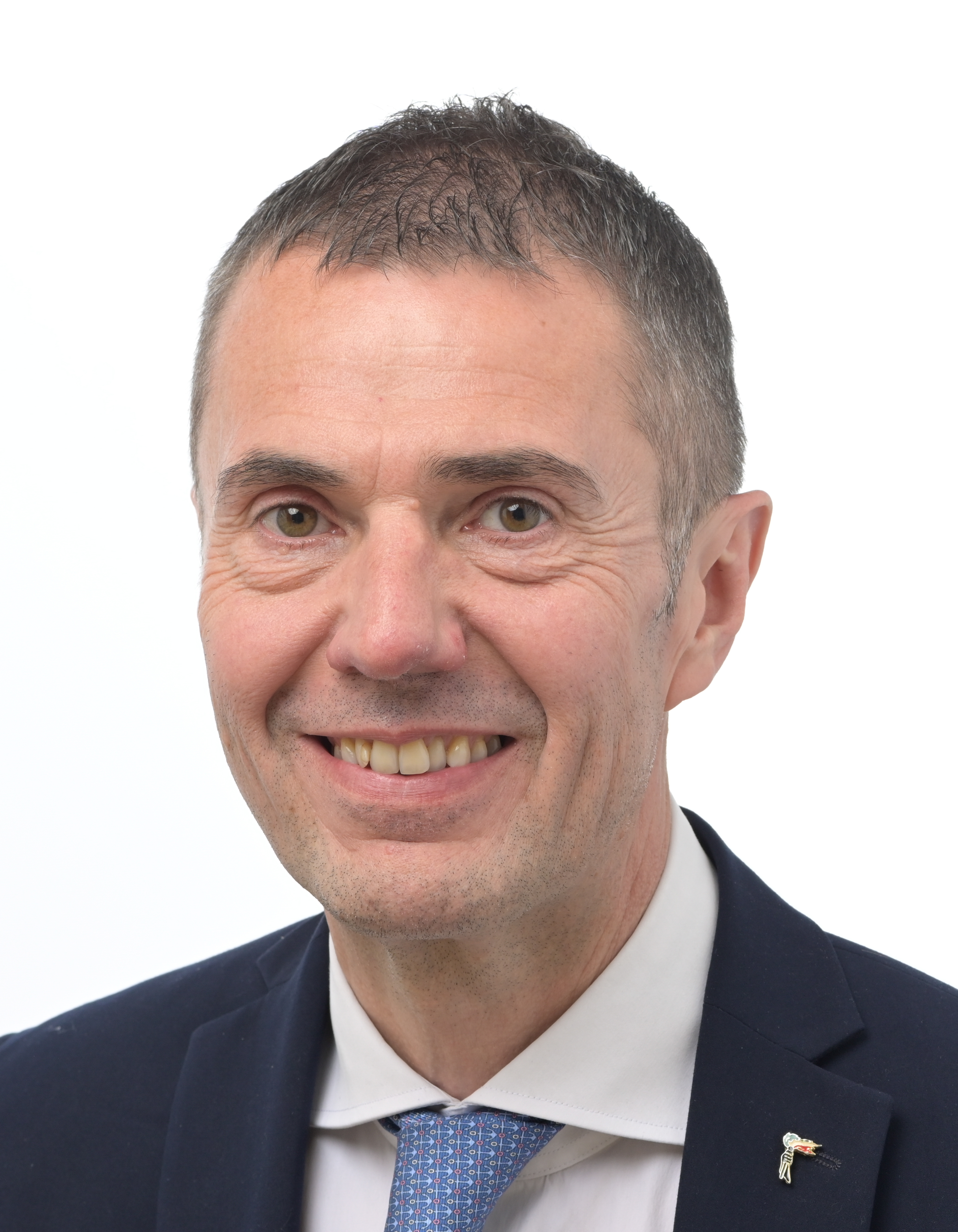

Member of the European Parliament
- Incumbent
- Assumed office 16 July 2024
- Constituency: North-East Italy

Mayor of Pordenone
- In office 20 June 2016 – 28 June 2024
- Preceded by: Claudio Pedrotti
- Succeeded by: Alessandro Basso

President of the Province of Pordenone
- In office 8 June 2009 – 27 October 2014
- Preceded by: Elio De Anna
- Succeeded by: Claudio Pedrotti

Personal details
- Born: 2 August 1970 (age 56) Pordenone, Friuli-Venezia Giulia, Italy
- Party: Right-wing independent (since 2015)
- Other political affiliations: MSI (until 1995); AN (1995-2009); PdL (2009-2012); FdI (2012-2015)
- Education: University of Trieste

Alessandro Ciriani (born 2 August 1970) is an Italian politician.

He is the younger brother of Senator Luca Ciriani.

He served as President of the Province of Pordenone from 2009 to 2014.

Ciriani ran as an independent for the office of Mayor of Pordenone at the 2016 Italian local elections, supported by a centre-right coalition. He won and took office on 20 June 2016.

In 2024, he ran for European Parliament on the Fratelli d'Italia party list in North East Italy constituency. He received 44027 preference votes and was elected. He resigned his mandate as the mayor of Pordenone on 28 June 2024.

== See also ==
- 2016 Italian local elections
- List of mayors of Pordenone

Political offices
Preceded by Claudio Pedrotti	Mayor of Pordenone; 2016–2024	Succeeded by Alessandro Basso
Preceded by Elio De Anna	President of the Province of Pordenone; 2009–2014	Succeeded by Claudio Pedrotti
