= Arun Sarin =

Indian-American businessman (born 1954)

- Born: 21 October 1954 (age 71); Pachmarhi, Madhya Pradesh, India
- Education: B.Tech. (1975) IIT, Kharagpur; MS (1978) UC Berkeley; MBA (1978) Haas School of Business
- Occupation: Business executive
- Known for: Former CEO of Vodafone (2003 - 2008)
- Predecessor: Sir Christopher Gent
- Successor: Vittorio Colao
- Board member of: Accenture; Ola Electric; Charles Schwab; UC Berkeley

Arun Sarin (born 21 October 1954) is an Indian-American telecommunications executive.

Sarin was the former CEO of the telecom giant Vodafone, serving from 2003 until 2008. He drove the integration of Vodafone, Airtouch and Mannesman. He was also the driving force behind the Vodafone's strategic move into emerging markets, especially Asia and Africa, through the purchases of Turkish operator Telsim and a controlling stake in Hutchison Essar in India. He was a senior advisor at the private equity firm KKR. He also serves on the board of directors of Ola Electric, Charles Schwab and Accenture.

Sarin received an honorary knighthood from the Queen at Buckingham Palace on 10 March 2010.

== Early life and education ==
Sarin was born in Pachmarhi, Madhya Pradesh, India, in 1954. He pursued his secondary education at the Bangalore Military School. Thereafter, he joined the Indian Institute of Technology, Kharagpur and graduated with a B.Tech. degree in metallurgical engineering in 1975. In 1978, he gained a MS in engineering and an MBA from the Haas School of Business at the University of California, Berkeley.

== Career ==
=== Early career and AirTouch (1984 - 1999) ===
He started his career as a management consultant before moving in 1984 to Pacific Telesis Group in San Francisco. He was a director of AirTouch from July 1995 and was president and chief operating officer from February 1997.

=== Vodafone (1999 - 2008) ===
AirTouch was sold to Vodafone in 1999 for about $75 billion. He was then appointed Vodafone's chief executive officer for the United States and Asia Pacific region until 15 April 2000, when Vodafone's U.S. interests were merged into Verizon Wireless. He subsequently became chief executive of InfoSpace in 2000 and of Accel-KKR Telecom based in San Francisco from 2001 to 2003, while serving as a non-executive director of Vodafone. He rejoined Vodafone as chief executive designate on 1 April 2003 and was appointed on a permanent basis after the company's annual general meeting on 30 July 2003. On 27 May 2008, he announced his resignation (effective July) as CEO after Vodafone achieved record earnings.

During his tenure as chief executive of Vodafone group plc, he expanded the company geographically into countries like India, Turkey, South Africa etc. increasing the customer base to approximately 300 million. He expanded the product line of the company to include data, internet and broadband services. He streamlined the operations of the company under the Vodafone brand to utilize the global scale while maintaining local customer focus. He increased the dividends per share by 400 percent and returned value to shareholders through buybacks.

Sarin retired from Vodafone immediately after the company's annual general meeting on 29 July 2008, and was succeeded by then deputy-CEO Vittorio Colao.

=== After Vodafone (2008 to present) ===
In October 2009, Sarin was appointed as a senior advisor at the private equity firm KKR. He has been a member of the advisory board of Accel KKR from 2010 until 2019. He is currently an investor and adviser to a number of early stage technology companies based in the San Francisco Bay Area and India.

== Board ==
He serves on the board of directors of Ola Electric, Accenture and Charles Schwab. He also sits on the board of trustees for the Blum Center for Developing Economies at the University of California, Berkeley.
