= Delegated Authority for the Security of the Republic =

Italian government agency

- Autorità Delegata per la Sicurezza della Repubblica

Agency overview
- Formed: August 13, 2007; 18 years ago
- Jurisdiction: Government of Italy
- Headquarters: Palazzo Chigi, Rome
- Agency executive: Alfredo Mantovano, Undersecretary
- Website: sicurezzanazionale.gov.it

The Delegated Authority for the Security of the Republic (Italian: Autorità Delegata per la Sicurezza della Repubblica) is an Italian government agency within the Council of Ministers with the aim of coordinating the Prime Minister and intelligence agencies. The current officeholder is Alfredo Mantovano, Secretary of the Council of Ministers in the government of Giorgia Meloni.

== History ==
The Delegated Authority was foreseen with the Italian intelligence reform of 2007 promoted by the government of Romano Prodi and officially implemented on 13 August 2007. In October 2007, Prodi delegated the authority to the Enrico Luigi Micheli. In 2011, Prime Minister Mario Monti initially did not delegate the mandate, maintaining his prerogatives over Italian intelligence. Even Prime Minister Giuseppe Conte did not appoint a delegated authority, keeping responsibility for it in his powers for almost the entire duration of his two governments.

In June 2021, the Council of Ministers of the Mario Draghi government approved the establishment of a National Cybersecurity Agency, reporting to the Prime Minister and the Delegated Authority.

== List of Undersecretaries ==
Portrait	Name (Born–Died)	Term of office			Party	Government	Ref.
Portrait	Name (Born–Died)	Took office	Left office	Time in office	Party	Government	Ref.
	Enrico Luigi Micheli (1938–2011)	26 October 2007	8 May 2008	195 days	The Daisy / Democratic Party	Prodi II	
	Gianni Letta (1935– )	8 May 2008	16 November 2011	3 years, 192 days	The People of Freedom	Berlusconi IV	
Office not in use		16 November 2011 – 14 May 2012				Monti	
	Giovanni De Gennaro (1948–)	14 May 2012	28 April 2013	349 days	Independent	Monti	
	Marco Minniti (1956– )	17 May 2013	12 December 2016	3 years, 209 days	Democratic Party	Letta	
	Marco Minniti (1956– )	17 May 2013	12 December 2016	3 years, 209 days	Democratic Party	Renzi	
	Luciano Pizzetti (1959–)	29 December 2016	1 June 2018	1 year, 337 days	Democratic Party	Gentiloni	
Office not in use		1 June 2018 – 22 January 2021				Conte I·II	
	Pietro Benassi (1958–)	22 January 2021	13 February 2021	22 days	Independent	Conte I·II	
	Franco Gabrielli (1960–)	1 March 2021	22 October 2022	1 year, 235 days	Independent	Draghi	
	Alfredo Mantovano (1958– )	24 November 2022	Incumbent	3 years, 257 days	Independent	Meloni	
