= Giuseppe Garlato =

Italian politician (1896–1988)

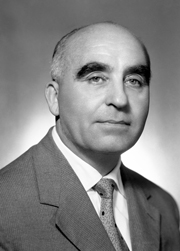
Giuseppe Garlato

Giuseppe Garlato (22 December 1896 – 5 September 1988) is an Italian engineer and politician who served as Mayor of Pordenone (1946–1956), member of the Constituent Assembly (1946–1948), Deputy (1948–1958), Senator (1958–1968), and Undersecretary of State (1959–1962).

Political offices
Preceded by Giuseppe Asquini	Mayor of Pordenone; 1946–1956	Succeeded by Gustavo Montini
