= Manlio Di Stefano =

Italian politician (born 1981)

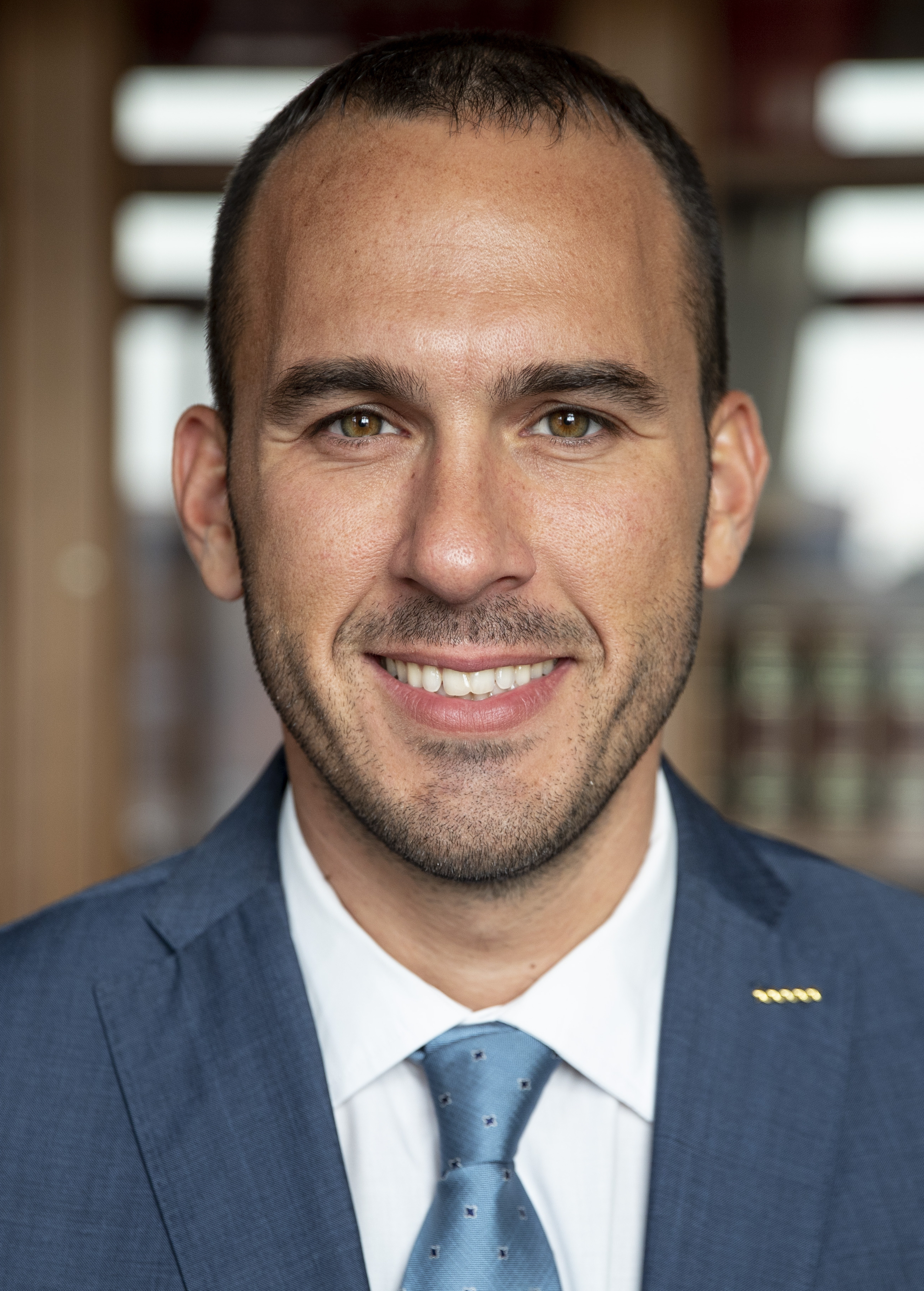

Member of the Chamber of Deputies
- In office 15 March 2013 – 12 October 2022
- Constituency: Lombardy 1

Personal details
- Party: None
- Other political affiliations: M5S (2009–2022); IpF (2022)

Manlio Di Stefano (born 16 May 1981) is an Italian politician.

== Political career ==
In the 2013 Italian general election, Di Stefano was elected to the Chamber of Deputies from the Five Star Movement. Between 2018 and 2022, he was the Undersecretary of State for Foreign Affairs and International Cooperation in the first Conte government, in the second Conte government and in the Draghi government with primary responsibilities for the Internationalization of Enterprises, Trade (including G7 and G20), and bilateral relations with Asian countries.
