= Fabiana Dadone =

Italian politician (born 1984)

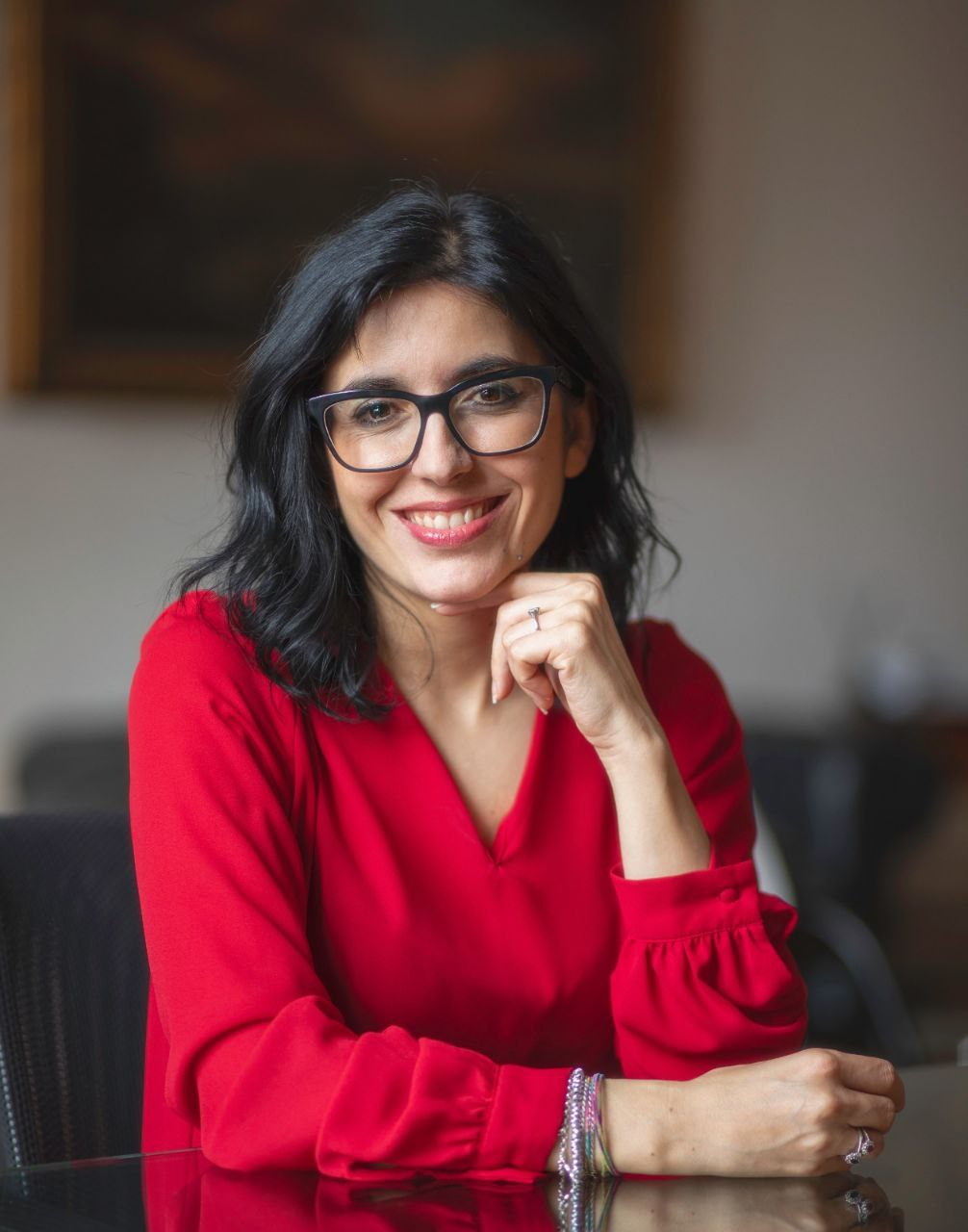

Minister for Youth Policies
- In office 13 February 2021 – 22 October 2022
- Prime Minister: Mario Draghi
- Preceded by: Vincenzo Spadafora
- Succeeded by: Andrea Abodi

Minister of Public Administration
- In office 5 September 2019 – 13 February 2021
- Prime Minister: Giuseppe Conte
- Preceded by: Giulia Bongiorno
- Succeeded by: Renato Brunetta

Member of the Chamber of Deputies
- In office 15 March 2013 – 13 October 2022
- Constituency: Piedmont 2

Personal details
- Born: 12 February 1984 (age 42) Cuneo, Piedmont, Italy
- Party: Five Star Movement
- Education: University of Turin

Fabiana Dadone (born 12 February 1984) is an Italian politician, who served as Minister for Youth Policies in the Draghi Cabinet between 2021 and 2022, as well as Minister of Public Administration in the Conte II Cabinet between 2019 and 2021.

== Biography ==
Fabiana Dadone graduated in law from the University of Turin and was a practicing lawyer in Ceva; however, she never passed the exam for the habilitation to be a lawyer.

In 2013, she was elected to the Chamber of Deputies for the first time and was subsequently re-elected in the 2018 election.

On 16 September 2018 The Blog of the Stars (official organ of the Five Star Movement) announced in a post that Fabiana Dadone became new contact of the "Rousseau platform" (the web platform created by Gianroberto Casaleggio), for the Network Shield function. She took the place of Alfonso Bonafede, who was appointed Minister of Justice in the first Conte Government.

On 25 June 2019, after being chosen by Luigi Di Maio, she was voted by the membership base to become a member of the Board of Arbitrators of the Five Star Movement.

On 4 September 2019, she was appointed Minister of Public Administration in the Conte II Cabinet.

On 13 February 2021, she was appointed Minister of Youth in the Draghi Cabinet.
