= Luca Lotti =

Italian politician (born 1982)

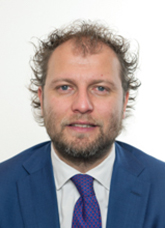

Minister for Sport
- In office 12 December 2016 – 1 June 2018
- Prime Minister: Paolo Gentiloni
- Succeeded by: Vincenzo Spadafora (2019)

Member of the Chamber of Deputies
- Incumbent
- Assumed office 15 March 2013
- Constituency: Tuscany

Personal details
- Born: 20 June 1982 (age 44) Empoli, Tuscany, Italy
- Party: The Daisy (2004–2007); Democratic Party (since 2007)
- Education: University of Florence

Luca Lotti (born 20 June 1982) is an Italian politician who served as the Minister for Sport from 2016 to 2018 in the Gentiloni Cabinet.

== Biography ==
Born in Empoli, Lotti graduated in Administration Sciences at the Cesare Alfieri Institute in Florence with a thesis on "e-government on relations between public administration and citizens".

He was member of Azione Cattolica, he played soccer in Eccellenza and he was also a coach of a soccer team of children. In 2004 and 2009 Lotti was elected municipal councillor in Montelupo Fiorentino.

In 2006, he joined the staff of Matteo Renzi, at the time President of the Province of Florence. In 2009, after the election of Renzi as mayor of Florence, he was named Responsible for the Mayor's Secretariat and subsequently Head of the cabinet in the municipality of Florence.

In 2013, he was elected in the Italian general election to the Chamber of Deputies; from 28 February 2014 he was Undersecretary to the Presidency of the Council with responsibility for information, communication and publishing in the Renzi Cabinet. He was also secretary of the interministerial Committee for economic planning. From 2016 to 2018, he served as the Minister for Sport in the Gentiloni Cabinet.

He was reelected deputy in the 2018 Italian general election.

== Judicial proceedings ==
=== Investigation on Consip contracts ===
In December 2016, Lotti was investigated for aiding and revealing secret investigations in an inquiry into Consip tenders conducted by the public prosecutor in Naples. On 15 March 2017, the Senate rejected a distrust motion tabled by the Five Star Movement against him for this circumstance. In October 2018, the judge for preliminary investigations required that Lotti be indicted for aiding and abetting.

=== Appointments of chief prosecutors ===
According to the prosecutor's office of Perugia, numerous meetings would take place in May 2019 between Luca Palamara, a member of the Superior Council of the Judiciary (CSM) who was officially struck off as a magistrate following a corruption investigation, and the MPs Cosimo Ferri and Luca Lotti to discuss the appointment of the head of the Rome prosecutor's office, which requested the trial for Lotti. On 14 June 2019, Lotti suspended himself from the Democratic Party following his involvement in the investigation into the powers of attorney and the appointment of the CSM.

== See also ==
- Renzi Cabinet
