= Gianni Vernetti =

Italian politician (born 1960)

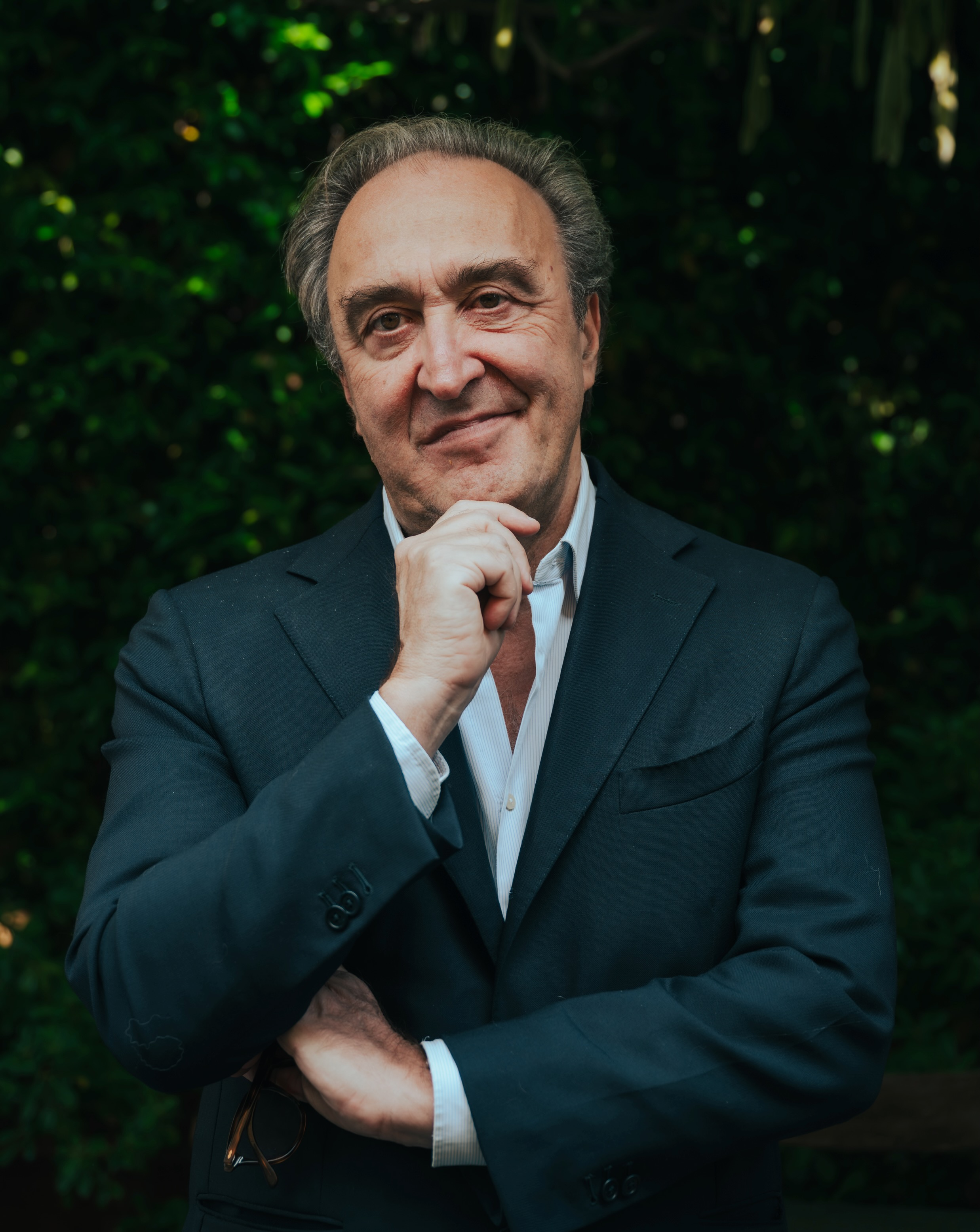
Vernetti in 2025

Gianni Vernetti (born 27 November 1960) is a writer and Italian politician.

== Early life ==
Vernetti was born in Turin, in the Italian region of Piedmont, on 27 November 1960. In 1985, he graduated in Architecture at the Polytechnic University of Turin. In 1987, he was awarded a PhD in Urban Ecology from the Polytechnic University of Milan.

== Political career ==
Between 1993 and 1999, Vernetti was deputy mayor of Turin in charge of public works, environment and sustainable development, and urban renovation. In 2001, Vernetti was elected to the Chamber of Deputies of the Italian Parliament. As the leader of his group in the Commission on Energy and Industry, he promoted several initiatives on Renewable Energies. He was a member of the National Steering Committee of his party, The Daisy, a centrist political party member of the European Democratic Party (EDP) and of the Alliance of Liberals and Democrats for Europe Group (ALDE) in the European Parliament.

In 2006, Vernetti was elected to the Senate of the Republic. As the centre-left coalition won the general election, he became Undersecretary of State for Foreign Affairs in the second Prodi government. He was in charge of bilateral relations between Italy and the Asia/Pacific countries and on Democracy and Human Rights issues. Vernetti coordinated all the Italian initiatives in Afghanistan, where Italy took part in the NATO military mission and coordinated the Justice Sector and Rule of Law Reform. He promoted the new Italian policies towards Central Asia, implementing several development aid projects, and improving economic, commercial and military cooperation.

Vernetti coordinated the Italian initiatives in Asia promoting several projects of economic, scientific, commercial, and military cooperation, particularly between Italy and India, Japan, South Korea, Vietnam, Philippines and Indonesia. Vernetti coordinated the Italian campaign for the Universal Moratorium on the Death Penalty, coordinating the action to seek consensus at the United Nations that led to the approval of the resolution in December 2007. He represented as well Italy in the UN Human Rights Council between 2006 and 2008. Vernetti coordinated the Italian initiatives in the Pacific area and promoted the entrance of Italy into the Pacific Islands Forum.

In 2008, Vernetti was elected for a third term in the Chamber of Deputies, and he was a member of the Foreign Affairs Committee and the Italian Delegation to the NATO Parliamentarian Assembly. He was a member of the Steering Committee of the European Democratic Party. He became a coordinator of the Alliance of Democrats, an international network of more than 70 liberal-democratic and centrist political parties from all the five continents. He also became co-president of the Italian group of the Liberal International, president of the Italy–Tibet Parliamentary Association in 2008, and vice-president of the Italy–Israel Parliamentary Association.

== Later career ==
In 2013, after three terms in Parliament, Vernetti decided not to run again and founded Gea Solar, a company focused on utility-scale Solar PV development in Africa, Asia, and Latin America. Starting in 2017, he promoted his blog (giannivernetti.it), with information on current geopolitical affairs and international politics. Beginning in January 2018, he became a columnist on foreign affairs at the Italian daily newspaper La Stampa, and in May 2020 became a columnist at HuffPost Italia, writing several op-eds and reportages on foreign politics, security, and human rights. Starting from May 2020, he became a columnist at La Repubblica, writing editorials, reports and interviews on the most relevant global crises, the growing confrontation between democracies and authoritarian regimes, the new threats to international security, and the challenges posed by the regimes of Russia, China, and Iran. In January 2021, Vernetti co-founded and served as president of AccessiWay, a European digital accessibility company that provides comprehensive solutions to make websites, web applications, and mobile applications accessible to people with disabilities. The company specializes in ensuring compliance with European and national accessibility regulations, including the EU Accessibility Act.

In March 2022, Vernetti published Dissident for Rizzoli Libri and analyzed the growing confrontation between democracies and autocracies, accompanying the reader on a journey through the mountains of Kurdistan, where the Kurdish fighters defeated the jihadist militias of ISIS; on the slopes of the Himalayas, where a handful of monks saved the thousand-year-old Tibetan culture; in the small and combative Lithuania, which experienced all the totalitarianisms of the 20th century and welcomed dissidents from Russia and Belarus; on the island of Taiwan resisting Chinese authoritarianism. This was followed in 2025 by Il nuovo Grande Gioco, which was published by Solferino Libri. Active in the defense of countries threatened by the autocracies of Russia, China, and Iran, Vernetti promoted various public initiatives in support of the war of liberation of Ukraine, the defense of the democratic Taiwan, and the support of Israel threatened by Iran and its proxies of Hamas, Hezbollah, and Houthis. He was also among the promoters of the Associazione 7 ottobre, which was founded in Italy to fight all new forms of antisemitism.

== Books ==
- Dissidenti. Da Aleksei Navalny a Nadia Murad, da Azar Nafisi al Dalai Lama: incontri con donne e uomini che lottano contro i regimi. Rizzoli, Milano, 2022. ISBN 978-88-1-716162-6
- Il nuovo Grande Gioco. Dal Giappone all'Ucraina: viaggio lungo la frontiera fra libertà e autoritarismo. Solferino Libri, Milano, 2025. ISBN 978-88-282-1798-5
- The New Great Game. From Japan to India and Ukraine: a journey along the fault line between freedom and authoritarianism. Pentagon Press, New Delhi, 2026. ISBN 978-8168698116

Italian Chamber of Deputies
Preceded by Antonio Mammola	Deputy for Torino College 4; 2001 –2006	Succeeded by College abolished
Preceded by	Deputy for Torino Province; 2008–2013	Succeeded by
Italian Senate
New title	Senator for Piedmont; 2006 –2008	Succeeded by Jointly held
Political offices
Preceded by Margherita Boniver	Undersecretary of State for Foreign Affairs; 2006 –2008	Succeeded by Stefania Craxi, Alfredo Mantica
