= Minister for Youth Policies =

Ministry in the Cabinet of Italy

The minister for youth policies (Italian: Ministro per le Politiche Giovanili) is one of the positions in the Cabinet of Italy.

The current minister is Andrea Abodi, an independent politician, who held the office since 22 October 2022.

== List of ministers ==
Parties

- 2006–present:
  - Democratic Party
  - The People of Freedom
  - Five Star Movement
  - Independent

Coalitions

- 2006–present:
  - Centre-right coalition
  - Centre-left coalition
  - Mixed coalition

Portrait	Name (Born–Died)	Term of office			Party	Government	Ref.
Portrait	Name (Born–Died)	Took office	Left office	Time in office	Party	Government	Ref.
Minister for Youth Policies and Sport
	Giovanna Melandri (1962– )	17 May 2006	8 May 2008	1 year, 357 days	Democrats of the Left / Democratic Party	Prodi II	
Minister of Youth
	Giorgia Meloni (1977– )	8 May 2008	16 November 2011	3 years, 192 days	The People of Freedom	Berlusconi IV	
Office not in use		2011–2012				Monti	
Minister for Equal Opportunities, Sport and Youth Policies
	Josefa Idem (1964– )	28 April 2013	27 June 2013	60 days	Democratic Party	Letta	
Office not in use		2013–2019				Renzi; Gentiloni	
Office not in use		2013–2019				Conte I	
Minister for Youth Policies and Sport
	Vincenzo Spadafora (1974– )	5 September 2019	13 February 2021	1 year, 161 days	Five Star Movement	Conte II	
Minister for Youth Policies
	Fabiana Dadone (1984– )	13 February 2021	22 October 2022	1 year, 251 days	Five Star Movement	Draghi	
Minister for Sport and Youth
	Andrea Abodi (1960– )	22 October 2022	Incumbent	2 years, 219 days	Independent	Meloni	
