= Roberto Garofoli =

Italian politician (born 1966)

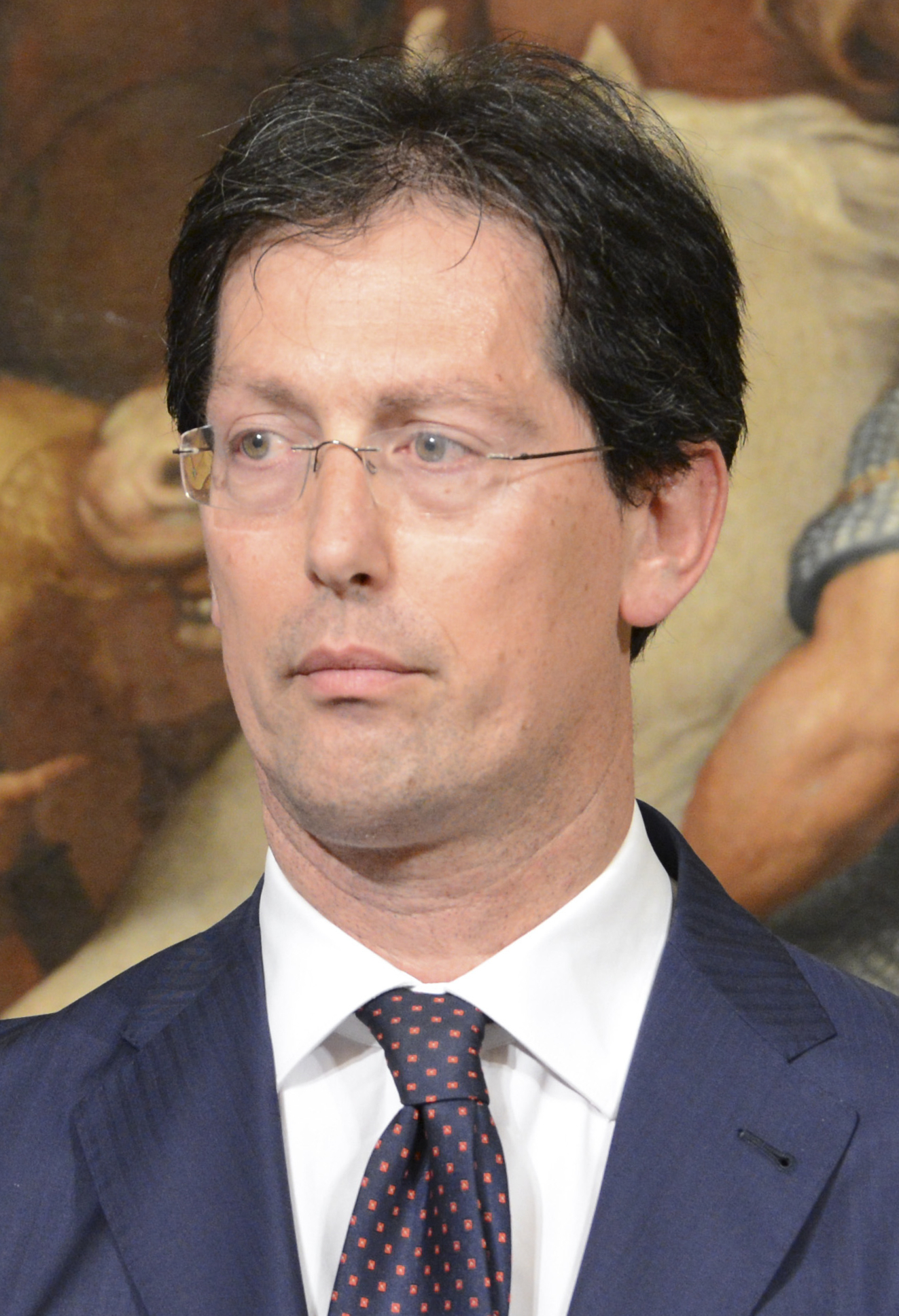

Secretary of the Council of Ministers
- In office 13 February 2021 – 22 October 2022
- Prime Minister: Mario Draghi
- Preceded by: Riccardo Fraccaro
- Succeeded by: Alfredo Mantovano

Personal details
- Born: 20 April 1966 (age 60) Taranto, Italy
- Education: University of Bari

Roberto Garofoli (born 20 April 1966) is an Italian magistrate and civil servant. He served as secretary of the council of ministers in the cabinet of Prime Minister Mario Draghi.

He has a degree in law from the University of Bari.

Political offices
Preceded by Riccardo Fraccaro	Secretary of the Council of Ministers; 2021–2022	Succeeded by Alfredo Mantovano
