= Federico D'Incà =

Italian politician (born 1976)

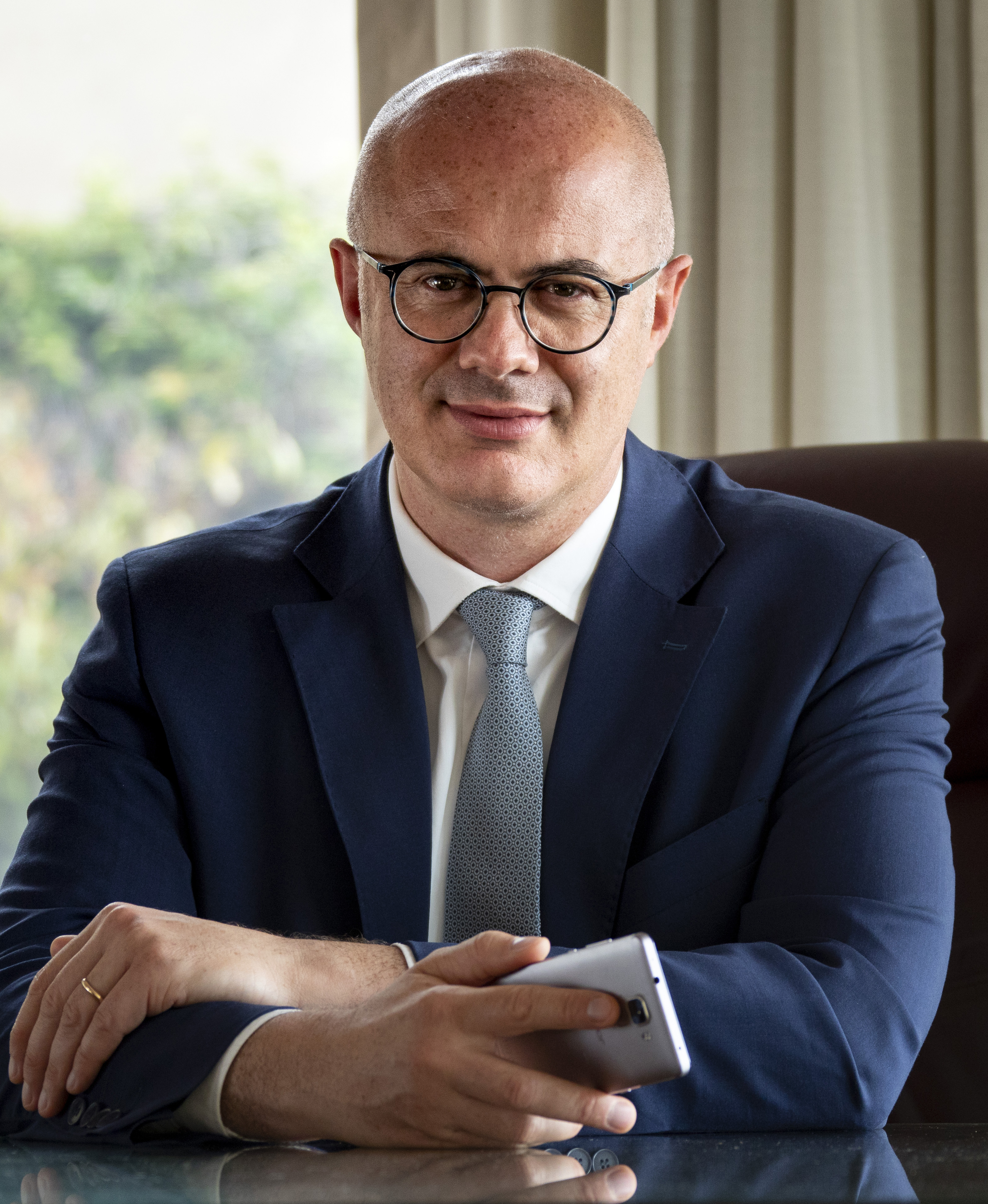

Minister for Parliamentary Relations
- In office 5 September 2019 – 22 October 2022
- Prime Minister: Giuseppe Conte; Mario Draghi
- Preceded by: Riccardo Fraccaro
- Succeeded by: Luca Ciriani

Member of the Chamber of Deputies
- In office 15 March 2013 – 13 October 2022
- Constituency: Veneto 2

Personal details
- Born: 10 February 1976 (age 50) Belluno, Veneto, Italy
- Party: Five Star Movement (until 2022); Environment 2050 (2022)
- Education: University of Trento

Federico D'Incà (born 10 February 1976) is an Italian politician, who was member of the Chamber of Deputies for the Five Star Movement from 2013 to 2022 and Minister for Parliamentary Relations from 2019 to 2022.

== Early life and career ==
D'Incà graduated in economics and commerce from the University of Trento. He was an IT management systems analyst in a private company until 2013, and previously was a senior manager in a multinational large-scale retail trade and quality manager in a robotics and automation company. He is a managing director of the Italy–USA Foundation.

== Politics ==
In the 2013 general elections he was elected deputy of the 17th legislature of the Italian Republic in the Veneto 2 constituency for the Five Star Movement. since 17 December 2013 he has been the group leader of the M5S in the Chamber of Deputies, taking over from Alessio Villarosa of which he was already deputy group leader. Riccardo Nuti, previously the group leader, however, remained officially president of the group for technical-bureaucratic reasons due to the parliamentary organization until 4 September 2014 when his predecessor Villarosa officially became one.

On 26 March 2015 he officially became president of the M5S parliamentary group, thus legally representing the group in administrative and bureaucratic areas.

In 2016 he held the role of vice president of the Parliamentary Commission of Inquiry for the digitization of the Public Administration.

Re-elected in 2018 again with the M5S, he was appointed quaestor of the Chamber of Deputies. He is a member of the Budget, Treasury and Planning Commission, the Communication and External Information Committee, the Supervisory Committee on Documentation Activities, the Personnel Affairs Committee, the Security Committee.

On 5 September 2019 he has been appointed Minister for Relations with the Parliament of the Conte II Government. On 3 October 2019 he also received the delegation for the Reforms.

He remained in office in the Draghi Cabinet.

On 30 July 2022, he left the M5S and on 1 August, alongside Member of the Chamber of Deputies Davide Crippa, he founded Environment 2050, a progressive and environmentalist political organization.

Political offices
Preceded by Riccardo Fraccaro	Italian Minister for Parliamentary Relations; 2019–2022	Succeeded by Luca Ciriani
