= Davide Crippa =

Italian politician (born 1979)

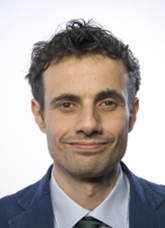
- Crippa in 2018

Member of the Chamber of Deputies
- In office 15 March 2013 – 12 October 2022
- Constituency: Piedmont 2 (2013–2018); Piedmont 2 – P02 (2018–2022)

Personal details
- Born: 11 April 1979 (age 47)
- Party: Independent (since 2022)
- Other party: Five Star Movement (until 2022); Environment 2050 (2022)

Davide Crippa (born 11 April 1979) is an Italian politician. From 2013 to 2022, he was a member of the Chamber of Deputies. From 2019 to 2022, he served as group leader of the Five Star Movement. From 2018 to 2019, he served as undersecretary of the Ministry of Economic Development.
