= Stanca Act =

The Stanca Act is an Italian law of 2004 that promotes accessibility of information technology. The law also applies to Italian government websites.

== History ==
The name of this law refers to its proponent, Lucio Stanca, Minister of Innovations during the second cabinet of Berlusconi.

The law was unanimously approved by Parliament, was published in the Italian Gazzetta Ufficiale of 17 January 2004, and became operational after more than a year. The law includes a set of requirements which must be used when public bodies are procuring websites.

On 16 September 2013 an update of this law was published in the Gazzetta Ufficiale. The update aligns the law with W3C WCAG 2.0 standards.
