= Iubenda =

Italian software company

iubenda
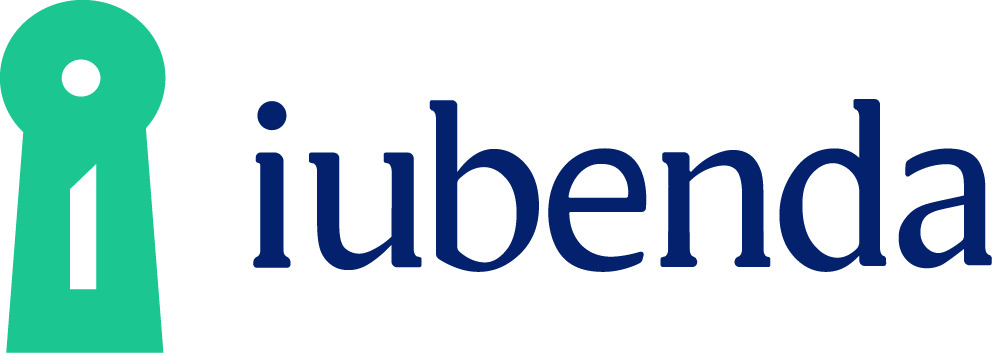
- Type: Subsidiary
- Industry: Software, privacy compliance
- Founded: 2011
- Founder: Andrea Giannangelo
- Headquarters: Milan, Italy
- Area served: Worldwide
- Key people: Manuel Heilmann (CEO)
- Products: Consent management platform; privacy compliance tools
- Number of employees: 150 (2024)
- Parent: team.blue (since 2022)
- Website: www.iubenda.com/en/

iubenda (stylized in lowercase; Italian pronunciation: [juˈbenda]) is an Italian software company that develops tools intended to support website and application compliance with data protection and privacy regulations, including consent management platforms. The company was founded in 2011 in Milan by Andrea Giannangelo. In February 2022, the company was acquired by team.blue.

== History ==
iubenda was founded in 2011 in Milan, Italy, initially focusing on automated privacy policy generation.

In 2015, the company expanded its services to include cookie compliance tools following the implementation of ePrivacy regulations in Italy. In 2018, following the introduction of the General Data Protection Regulation (GDPR) in the European Union, iubenda expanded its products to include consent management and compliance documentation services.

In February 2022, iubenda was acquired by team.blue, which obtained a majority stake in the company. Italian media described the acquisition as one of the largest Italian technology startup exits in recent years. In October 2022, iubenda acquired consentmanager, a Sweden-based consent management provider. In 2025, the company acquired CookieFirst, a Netherlands-based consent management platform. In 2025, iubenda partnered with AccessiWay, a digital accessibility company owned by team.blue.

== Activities ==
iubenda develops software tools intended to support compliance with data protection and privacy regulations. Its products include generators for privacy policies, cookie banners, terms and conditions documents, and consent management platforms. The company’s consent management platform integrates with frameworks used for online advertising and privacy compliance, including Google's Consent Mode. The platform is designed to support compliance with regulatory frameworks including the GDPR in the European Union, the UK GDPR, Brazil’s LGPD, Switzerland’s FADP and privacy laws in the United States. Its tools can be integrated with content management systems, web applications, and other digital platforms, including WordPress. The company operates internationally, with a customer base of more than 150,000 organisations, primarily in Europe and the Americas.
