= List of mayors of Pordenone =

Mayor of Pordenone
- Sindaco di Pordenone
- Incumbent; Alessandro Basso since 18 April 2025
- Appointer: Popular election
- Term length: 5 years, renewable once
- Formation: 1866
- Website: Official website

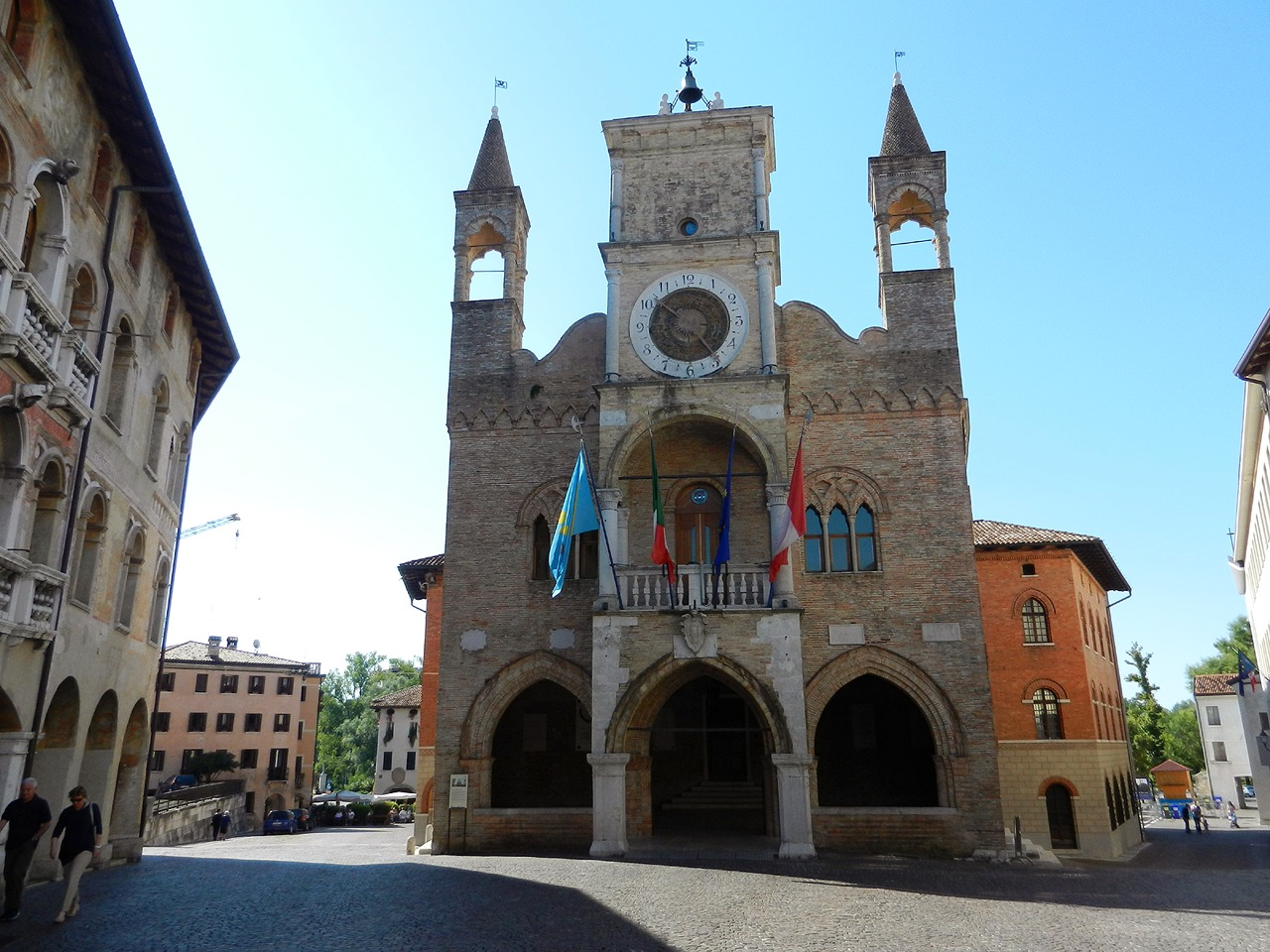
Pordenone's Town Hall.

The mayor of Pordenone is an elected politician who, along with the Pordenone City Council, is accountable for the strategic government of Pordenone in Friuli-Venezia Giulia, Italy.

The current mayor is Alessandro Basso (FdI), who took office on 18 April 2025.

== Overview ==
According to the Italian Constitution, the mayor of Pordenone is member of the City Council.

The mayor is elected by the population of Pordenone, who also elects the members of the City Council, controlling the mayor's policy guidelines and is able to enforce his resignation by a motion of no confidence. The mayor is entitled to appoint and release the members of his government.

Since 1994 the mayor is elected directly by Pordenone's electorate: in all mayoral elections in Italy in cities with a population higher than 15,000 the voters express a direct choice for the mayor or an indirect choice voting for the party of the candidate's coalition. If no candidate receives at least 50% of votes, the top two candidates go to a second round after two weeks. The election of the City Council is based on a direct choice for the candidate with a preference vote: the candidate with the majority of the preferences is elected. The number of the seats for each party is determined proportionally.

== Italian Republic (since 1946) ==
=== City Council election (1946–1993) ===
From 1948 to 1993, the Mayor of Pordenone was elected by the City Council.

	Mayor	Term start	Term end	Party
1	Giuseppe Garlato	1946	1956	DC
2	Gustavo Montini	1956	1967	DC
3	Giacomo Ros	1967	1975	DC
4	Glauco Moro	1975	1979	DC
5	Giancarlo Rossi	1979	1983	DC
6	Alvaro Cardin	1983	1993	DC

=== Direct election (since 1993) ===
Since 1993, under provisions of new local administration law, the Mayor of Pordenone is chosen by direct election, originally every four, then every five years.

	Mayor	Term start	Term end	Party	Coalition	Election
7	Alfredo Pasini	21 June 1993	12 May 1997	LN	LN	1993
7	Alfredo Pasini	12 May 1997	28 February 2001 (Note: Ousted from office after the majority of the members of the City Council resigned all together.)	LN	LN	1997
Special Prefectural Commissioner's tenure (28 February 2001 – 26 June 2001)
8	Sergio Bolzonello	26 June 2001	11 April 2006	Ind	DS • DL	2001
8	Sergio Bolzonello	11 April 2006	1 June 2011	Ind	DS • DL	2006
9	Claudio Pedrotti	1 June 2011	20 June 2016	PD	PD	2011
10	Alessandro Ciriani	20 June 2016	5 October 2021	Ind	FI • LN • FdI	2016
10	Alessandro Ciriani	5 October 2021 (Note: Election originally scheduled for June 2021 then postponed due to the COVID-19 pandemic.)	28 June 2024 (Note: Resigned after being elected member of the European Parliament. The deputy mayor Alberto Parigi (FdI) held the office till a new municipal election was held.)	Ind	FI • Lega • FdI • UDC	2021
11	Alessandro Basso	18 April 2025	Incumbent	FdI	FI • Lega • FdI • UDC	2025
