= Lucio Stanca =

Italian politician (born 1941)

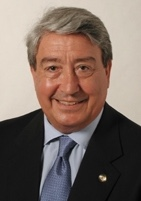

Minister for Innovation and Technologies
- In office 11 June 2001 – 17 May 2006
- Prime Minister: Silvio Berlusconi
- Preceded by: –
- Succeeded by: Pier Luigi Bersani as Minister of Economic Development

Personal details
- Born: 20 October 1941 (age 84) Lucera, Italy
- Party: Forza Italia (2001–2009)
- Other political affiliations: The People of Freedom (2009–2012)
- Education: Bocconi University

Lucio Stanca (born 20 October 1941, in Lucera) is an Italian politician. He was Minister for Innovation and Technologies in the second and third Berlusconi cabinet, and later CEO of the Expo 2015 SpA.

== Career ==
Lucio Stanca was Executive Chairman of IBM Europe, Middle East and Africa until his retirement in 2001. In the same year he was elected as Deputy of the Italian Parliament and became Minister of Innovation and Technology for the government of Italy till 2006.

From 2008 to March 2013 he was a Senator of the Italian Parliament. He also was president and chief executive officer of Expo 2015 Spa from 2009 to 2010. From 1994 to 2006 a director of Bocconi University in Milan.

He is also known for giving its name to the Stanca Act, the Italian law that promotes the accessibility of information technology. As of September 2020, he is a member of the Italian Aspen Institute.
