= Luca Ciriani =

Italian politician

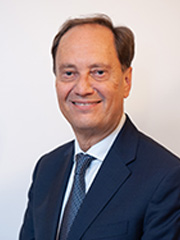
- Official portrait, 2022

Minister for Parliamentary Relations
- Incumbent
- Assumed office 22 October 2022
- Prime Minister: Giorgia Meloni
- Preceded by: Federico D'Incà

Member of the Regional Council of Friuli-Venezia Giulia
- In office 13 October 1998 – 27 March 2018

Vice President of Friuli-Venezia Giulia
- In office 15 May 2008 – 25 April 2013
- President: Renzo Tondo
- Preceded by: Gianfranco Moretton
- Succeeded by: Sergio Bolzonello

Member of the Senate of the Republic
- Incumbent
- Assumed office 23 March 2018
- Constituency: Friuli-Venezia Giulia

Personal details
- Born: 26 January 1967 (age 59) Pordenone, Italy
- Party: Brothers of Italy (since 2015)
- Other political affiliations: MSI (until 1995); AN (1995-2009); PdL (2009-2013); FI (2013-2014)
- Education: University of Trieste

Luca Ciriani (born 26 January 1967) is an Italian politician who is the group leader of the Brothers of Italy grouping in the Senate of the Republic.

He had succeeded Federico D'Incà as Minister for Parliamentary Relations in the Meloni Cabinet.

His younger brother Alessandro Ciriani has served as Mayor of Pordenone and as a Member of the European Parliament.

== See also ==
- List of current Italian senators
