= Vincenzo Spadafora =

Italian politician

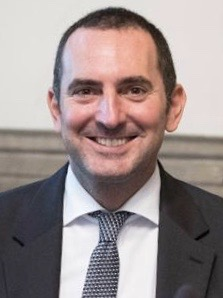

Minister for Youth Policies and Sport
- In office 5 September 2019 – 13 February 2021
- Prime Minister: Giuseppe Conte
- Preceded by: Luca Lotti (Sport, 2018)
- Succeeded by: Fabiana Dadone (Youth Policies)

Member of the Chamber of Deputies
- In office 23 March 2018 – 13 October 2022
- Constituency: Casoria

Personal details
- Born: 12 March 1974 (age 52) Afragola, Campania, Italy
- Party: The Daisy (2002-2007); M5S (2009-2022); IpF (2022)
- Profession: Politician

Vincenzo Spadafora (born 12 March 1974 in Afragola) is an Italian politician. A member of Together for the Future (IpF) and a former member of the Five Star Movement (M5S), he served as Minister for Youth Policies in the Conte government between 2019 and 2021.

== Early life and career ==
Vincenzo Spadafora was born on 12 March 1974 in Afragola. After graduating from high school, he moved to Rome, where he began to work with UNICEF. After various humanitarian experiences in the field of Non-Governmental Organizations, in 2008 he was appointed president of UNICEF Italia, a position he held until 2011.

He began his political career in 1998 as private secretary of the President of the Campania Region Andrea Losco (UDEUR). He also worked in the Secretariat of the Greens led by Alfonso Pecoraro Scanio and in 2006 he became head of the secretariat under Francesco Rutelli at the Ministry of Cultural Heritage.

On 29 November 2011, he was appointed First guarantor for children and adolescents by the President of the Chamber Gianfranco Fini and the President of the Senate Renato Schifani. An exponent of the right-wing coalition parties, he was criticized by his political allies for his support to the rights of the homosexual civil unions and particularly for the homosexual adoptions both at a singular and political level.

In 2014 he published the book La terza Italia. Manifesto di un Paese che non si tira indietro (The Third Italy. Manifesto of a country that does not hold back).

Subsequently, he joined the staff of Luigi Di Maio, of which he became responsible for institutional relations. In 2018 he was elected to the Chamber of Deputies in the uninominal constituency of Casoria, with the 59.4% of the vote.

== Minister and undersecretary ==
On 12 June he was appointed Undersecretary for the Presidency of the Council of Ministers with responsibility for equal opportunities and young people in the first government of Giuseppe Conte. In July 2019, he was involved in the approval of the Italia bill named "Codice Rosso" which enforced guilties for the crimes of stalking and sexual violence, forbid forced marriages and also introduced the penal prosecution for the revenge porn and female facial injuries. Since 2019, Spadafora has been actively engaged in the approval of a national law against homophobia and transphobia. In 2021, he publicly came out as gay.

After Conte's resignation in September 2019, the national board of the Democratic Party (PD) officially opened to the possibility of forming a new cabinet in a coalition with the M5S, based on pro-Europeanism, green economy, sustainable development, fight against economic inequality and a new immigration policy. On 29 August President Sergio Mattarella formally invested Conte to form a new cabinet. On 5 September, Spadafora was sworn in as Minister for Youth Policies and Sport.

In February 2021, Conte resigned after losing the support of the centrist party Italia Viva. On 13 February, Mario Draghi became the new prime minister at the head of a national unity government, but Spadafora was not confirmed in the cabinet.

== Personal life ==
On 7 November 2021, during Fabio Fazio's talk-show Che tempo che fa, Spadafora came out as gay.

== Electoral history ==
Election	House	Constituency	Party	Votes	Result
2018	Chamber of Deputies	Campania 1 – Casoria	M5S	88,093	Elected

=== First-past-the-post elections ===
2018 general election (C): Casoria
Candidate	Party	Votes	%
Vincenzo Spadafora	Five Star Movement	88,093	59.4
Luca Scancariello	Centre-right coalition	33,882	22.9
Nicola Marrazzo	Centre-left coalition	17,600	11.9
Others		8,709	45.8
Total		148,284	100.0
