= Elio De Anna =

Italian rugby union player and politician

- Born: 30 September 1949 (age 77) Cordenons, Italy
- Height: 1.85 m (6 ft 1 in)
- Weight: 100 kg (15 st 10 lb)
- University: Ferrara
- Notable relative: Dino De Anna
- Occupation: Physician

Rugby union career
- Position: Wing
Senior career
| Years | Team | Apps | (Points) |
| 1968-1970 | Udine | | |
| 1970-1972 | Ferrara | | |
| 1972-1985 | Rovigo | 244 | |
International career
| Years | Team | Apps | (Points) |
| 1972-1980 | Italy | 27 | (32) |

Elio De Anna (born September 30, 1949 in Cordenons) is an Italian former rugby union player turned politician.

As rugby player, De Anna twice won the Italian title with Rugby Rovigo, where he played alongside his brother Dino. He received 27 caps for the Italian team from 1972 to 1980.

He graduated in medicine. He served as President of the Province of Pordenone with Forza Italia from 1999 to 2008.

After retiring as a player he practiced as a doctor, first in Rovigo then Cordenons, among the leadership positions held, including that of director of the Italian Athletics Federation.
