= Cabinet crisis =

Mass resignation, or threat thereof, of top-level government advisers

A cabinet crisis, government crisis or political crisis refers to a situation where an incumbent government is unable to form or function, is toppled through an uprising, or collapses. Political crises may correspond with, cause or be caused by an economic crisis, and may spread among neighbouring countries.

== Examples of cabinet crises ==
=== Belgium ===
- 2007–2011 Belgian political crisis
- 2010–2011 Belgian government formation
- 2019–2020 Belgian government formation

=== Canada ===
- Manitoba Schools Question
- 2024–2025 Canadian political crisis

=== Czech Republic ===
- 1997–1998 Czech political crisis

=== Estonia ===
- 2022 Estonian government crisis

=== France ===
- May 1958 crisis in France
- 2024–2025 French political crisis

=== Germany ===
- 2018 German government crisis
- 2024 German government crisis
- 2026 Merz government crisis

=== Iceland ===
- Cabinet of Björn Þórðarson (1942–44 caretaker government)
- Klaustur Affair

=== Iraq ===
- 2022 Iraqi political crisis

=== Italy ===
- 2008 Italian government crisis
- 2019 Italian government crisis
- 2021 Italian government crisis
- 2022 Italian government crisis

=== Japan ===
- 2023–2024 Japanese slush fund scandal

=== Netherlands ===
- Dutch childcare benefits scandal

=== Malawi ===
- 1964 Malawi cabinet crisis

=== Malaysia ===
- 2020–2022 Malaysian political crisis

=== Maldives ===
- 2011–2013 Maldives political crisis
- 2018 Maldives political crisis

=== Spain ===
- 2015–2016 Spanish government formation
- 2019–2020 Spanish government formation

=== Sri Lanka ===
- 2022 Sri Lankan political crisis

=== Sweden ===
- 1936 Swedish government crisis
- 1978 Swedish government crisis
- 1981 Swedish government crisis
- 2014 Swedish government crisis
- 2018–2019 Swedish government formation
- 2021 Swedish government crisis

=== Thailand ===
- 2005–2006 Thai political crisis
- 2008 Thai political crisis

=== Tunisia ===
- 2013–2014 Tunisian political crisis
- Mechichi Cabinet
- 2021 Tunisian political crisis

=== United Kingdom ===
- War cabinet crisis, May 1940
- Westland affair
- 2018 British cabinet reshuffle
- July 2022 United Kingdom government crisis
- October 2022 United Kingdom government crisis
- 2024 Scottish government crisis
- 2026 Labour Party leadership crisis

== See also ==
- Budget crisis – Deadlock blocking the passage of a budget
- Constitutional crisis – Conflict a governing law is unable to resolve
- Government shutdown – Cessation of government functions due to failure to fund
- Government formation – Selecting a prime minister and cabinet
- Gridlock (politics) – Political stalemate
