= 2008 Italian government crisis =

Fall of the second Prodi government

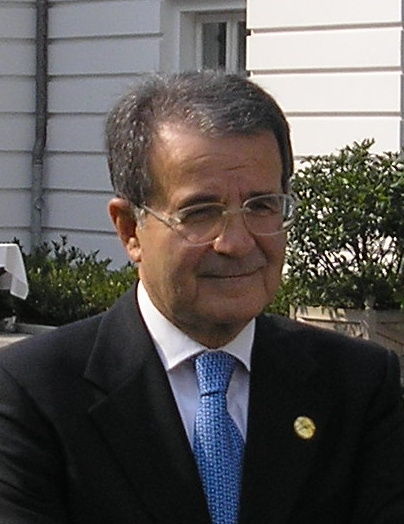
- Prodi at the 2007 G8 summit
- Date: 16 January 2008 – 5 February 2008
- Location: Italy
- Type: Parliamentary crisis
- Cause: Withdrawal of UDEUR's support to Romano Prodi's government
- Outcome: Confidence vote lost by the government in the Senate of the Republic; Resignation of Prodi; Dissolution of Parliament and snap election called

On 24 January 2008, the Italian Senate voted down a motion of confidence in Italian prime minister Romano Prodi, causing the collapse of the second Prodi government. Prodi's resignation led the Italian president Giorgio Napolitano to ask the president of the Senate, Franco Marini, to attempt to form a caretaker government. After Marini acknowledged an interim government could not be formed due to the lack of a clear majority in the Italian Parliament willing to support it, a snap election was scheduled for 13–14 April 2008.

== Background ==
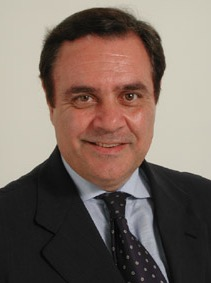
Clemente Mastella was the senator who started the crisis.

By the time the crisis started, Prodi had been in office for twenty months, after his centre-left coalition had won a majority of seats in Parliament in the 2006 Italian general election. One of the parties belonging to the coalition was the Union of Democrats for Europe (UDEUR), led by Clemente Mastella, who Prodi had chosen as his Minister of Justice.

On 16 January 2008, following media reports about an extensive corruption investigation involving him and his wife, who was also a member of UDEUR, Mastella resigned from the office of minister. After first promising to keep backing the government, he later withdrew his support: he was reportedly pressured into doing so by the Vatican, which objected to the government's liberal reform, such as its plans to introduce registered partnerships for same-sex couples.

Mastella's decision arrived a few days after the Constitutional Court of Italy had cleared the hurdle for the holding of referendum on amending the electoral system: the reforms proposed would have made it harder for smaller parties like Mastella's to win seats. As the collapse of the government would have disrupted the referendum, this further cemented Mastella's opinion that triggering a political crisis was necessary.

== Government crisis ==
UDEUR's defection forced the question of whether Prodi still had enough support in Parliament to govern. On 22 January 2008, Prodi asked for a confidence vote in the country's Chamber of Deputies, which he ended up winning the following day: UDEUR members of Parliament (MPs) decided not to take part in the vote, but the motion of confidence was nonetheless passed in a 326-275 vote. On 24 January, Prodi asked for a confidence vote in the Senate. The ensuing debate, held between 3pm and 9pm (CET), was heated and dramatic.

When UDEUR party senator Stefano Cusumano decided to rebel and back the government, he was verbally harassed by senator Nino Strano (National Alliance) who called him an "hysterical faggot", "piece of shit", "crooked", "traitor" and "mafioso", while fellow UDEUR senator Tommaso Barbato reportedly spat in his face. Cusumano apparently fainted and was carried out on a stretcher. The government lost the vote. After the president of the Senate announced the results, members of the opposition celebrated, with National Alliance MPs Nino Strano and Domenico Gramazio opening a bottle of champagne and eating mortadella; "Mortadella" was a derogatory nickname for Prodi.

23–24 January 2008 Confidence votes for Prodi II Cabinet
| House of Parliament | Vote | Parties | Votes |
|---|---|---|---|
| Chamber of Deputies (Voting: 601 of 630, Majority: 301) | Yes | PD, PRC-SE, CI, SD, RNP, IdV, Verdi, SVP, PRI, SocPC | 326 / 601 |
| Chamber of Deputies (Voting: 601 of 630, Majority: 301) | No | FI, AN, UDC, LN DCA-NPSI, MpA, LD | 275 / 601 |
| Chamber of Deputies (Voting: 601 of 630, Majority: 301) | Abstention | | 0 / 630 |
| Senate of the Republic (Voting: 318 of 322, Majority: 160) | Yes | PD, PRC-SE, SDSE, IU-Com-Verdi, Aut., UD-Consum, senators for life (Note: Of the seven senators for life serving at the time, four (Carlo Azeglio Ciampi, Emilio Colombo, Francesco Cossiga, and Oscar Luigi Scalfaro) voted Yes, while three (Giulio Andreotti, Rita Levi Montalcini, and Sergio Pininfarina) were absent.) | 156 / 318 |
| Senate of the Republic (Voting: 318 of 322, Majority: 160) | No | Forza Italia, AN, UDC, LN, DCA-PRI-MPA, UDEUR, PSI, LDU | 161 / 318 |
| Senate of the Republic (Voting: 318 of 322, Majority: 160) | Abstention | LDU | 1 / 318 |

== Aftermath ==
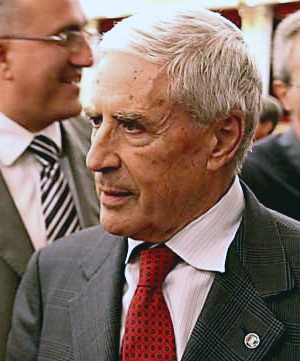
Franco Marini, the Senate president, was tasked to form a caretaker government. He did not succeed and an early general election was called.

On 30 January 2008, Napolitano asked Franco Marini to attempt to form a caretaker government, with the goal of avoiding a snap election until a new electoral system could have been in place. The electoral system that was in place at the time, the Porcellum, had drawn criticism both from the outgoing government and from the opposition, as well as from the general population. A common source of criticism was the fact voters could not pick individual candidates, and were instead forced to choose between slates prepared by parties. Some also felt that the presence of a majority bonus, to be awarded nationally for the Chamber of Deputies, and in each region for the Senate of the Republic, distorted the results of the election and created the risk of a Chamber of Deputies and a Senate at odds with each other in the event of a close election.

After Marini was given the task to try to form a new government, two politicians (Bruno Tabacci and Mario Baccini) splintered from the Union of Christian and Centre Democrats (UDC) to form The Rose for Italy, while two leading members of the Forza Italia faction Liberal Popular Union (Ferdinando Adornato and Angelo Sanza) switched parties and joined the UDC. On 4 February 2008, the Liberal Populars (an UDC faction that favoured a merged with Forza Italia) seceded from UDC, and merged with Silvio Berlusconi's The People of Freedom later the same year.

On 4 February 2008, Marini acknowledged that he had not found a majority willing to back a government led by him, and resigned his mandate, mainly due to opposition from the centre-right coalition parties Forza Italia and National Alliance, which, according to polls, were likely to win if a snap election was held, and as such wanted one to be called On 6 February 2008, Napolitano dissolved Parliament and called for fresh elections. The 2008 Italian general election was held on 13–14 April, together with the administrative elections. The elections resulted in a decisive victory for Berlusconi's centre-right coalition.

In 2014, Silvio Berlusconi was found guilty of corrupting senator Sergio de Gregorio, with Valter Lavitola acting as intermediary, to induce him to switch from the government to the opposition. The conviction was upheld in 2017.

== See also ==
- 2019 Italian government crisis
- 2021 Italian government crisis
- 2022 Italian government crisis
