= 2018 Italian government formation =

Selection of Giuseppe Conte and cabinet

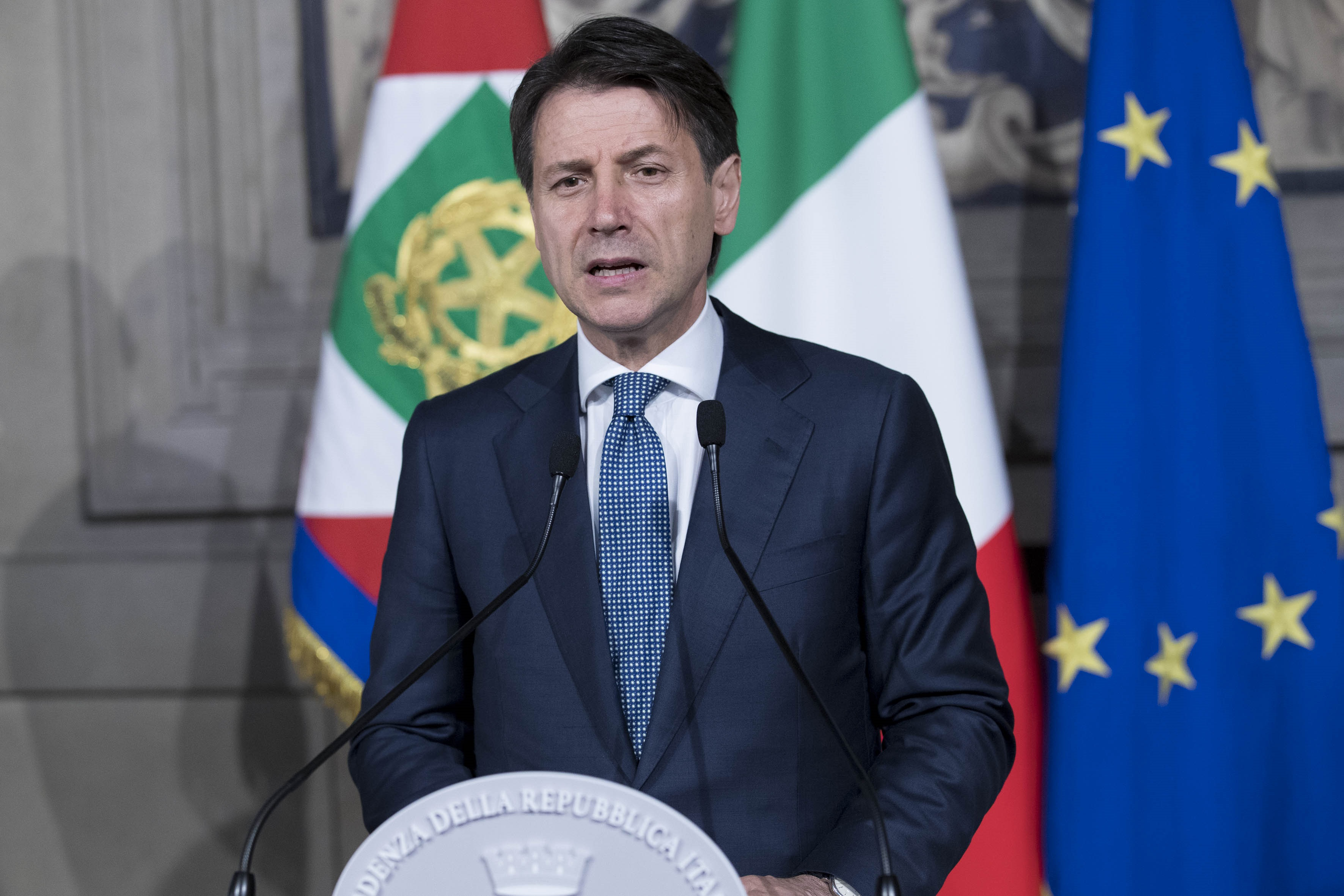
- Giuseppe Conte at the Quirinal Palace
- Date: 4 April 2018 – 31 May 2018
- Location: Italy
- Type: Parliamentary government formation
- Cause: 2018 Italian general election
- Participants: M5S, Lega, FI, PD, FdI, LeU, Aut, Mixed Group
- Outcome: Formation of the Conte Cabinet

In the 2018 Italian general election, no political group or party won an outright majority, resulting in a hung parliament. On 4 March, the centre-right coalition, in which Matteo Salvini's League emerged as the main political force, won a plurality of seats in the Chamber of Deputies and in the Senate, while the anti-establishment Five Star Movement (M5S) led by Luigi Di Maio became the party with the largest number of votes. The centre-left coalition, led by Matteo Renzi and the then-governing Democratic Party (PD), came third. Protracted negotiations were required before a government formation could be ultimated.

On 24 March 2018, following the elections of the presidents of the two houses of the Italian Parliament, Roberto Fico of the M5S, and Maria Elisabetta Alberti Casellati of Forza Italia (FI), Prime Minister Paolo Gentiloni (PD) resigned his post to President Sergio Mattarella. In accordance with common practice in Italy, Mattarella asked the prime minister to remain in office to deal with the current affairs until a new cabinet would have been formed.

On 31 May 2018, following 88 days of negotiations and several impasses, law professor Giuseppe Conte was appointed as the prime minister with support from the LN and the M5S, even though he hadn't run for the Italian Parliament. Matteo Salvini (Lega) and Luigi Di Maio (M5S) were also appointed as vice premiers, forming the 66th Italian government since World War II. The formation of a new government avoided the possibility of immediate new elections.

== Post-election developments ==
The election was seen as a backlash against the establishment with both the Five Star Movement (M5S) and the League becoming respectively the first and the third largest parties in the Parliament. With no political group or party having an outright majority, speculations were made around these possible outcomes:

- A government agreement between the M5S and the League, with potential support from Brothers of Italy and Forza Italia
- A government agreement between the M5S and the whole Centre-right coalition
- A government agreement between the M5S and the Democratic Party, with potential support from Free and Equal
- A government between the Centre-right coalition and the Centre-left coalition
- A caretaker government with the specific aims of approving the budget law and modifying the electoral law before holding a snap election in 2019
- A national unity government with all the political forces

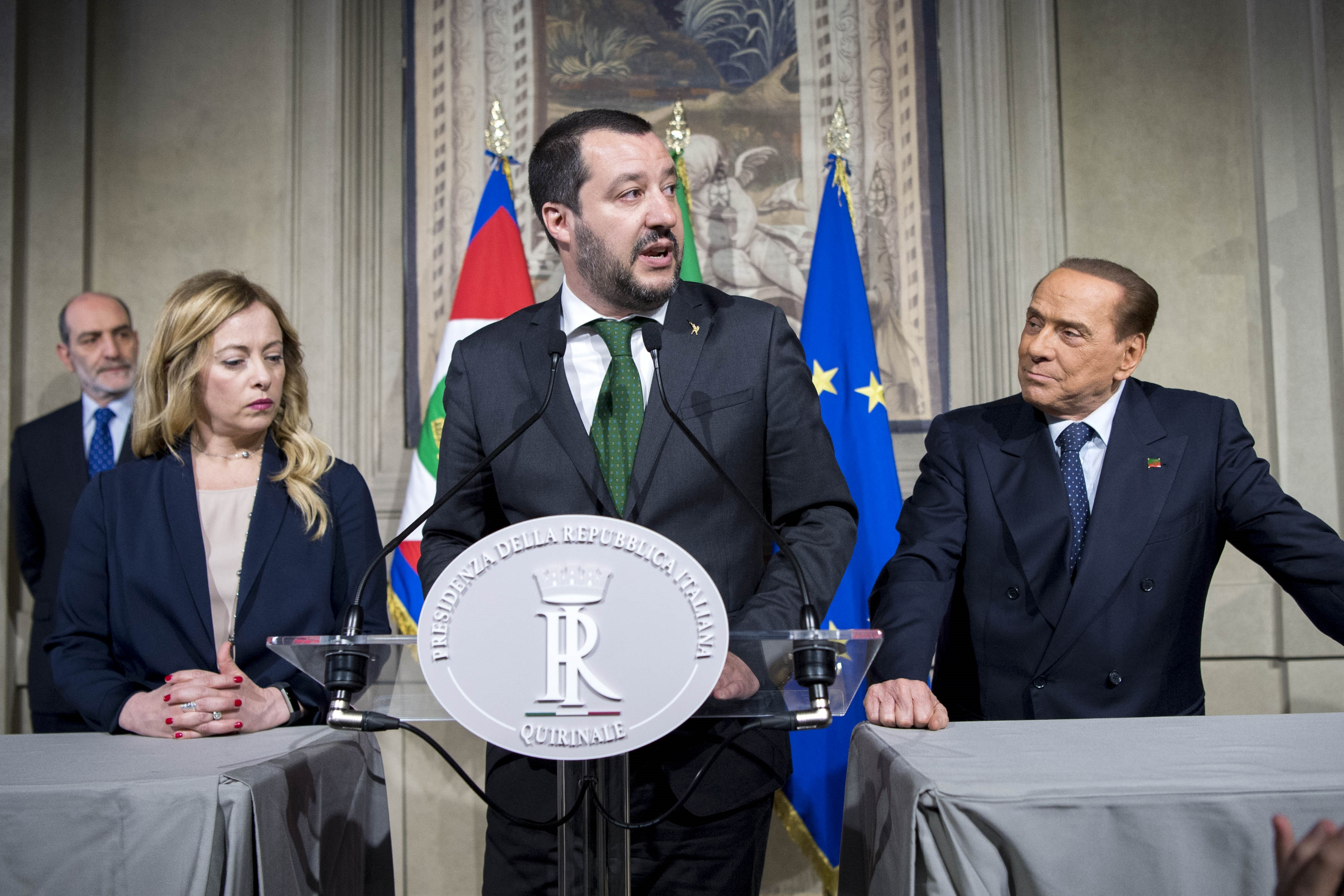
Giorgia Meloni, Matteo Salvini and Silvio Berlusconi, during the consultations.

After the election's results were known, both Di Maio and Salvini stated that President Mattarella must give them the task of forming a new cabinet because they led the largest party and the largest coalition, respectively. On 5 March, European rating agency Scope Ratings concluded the most probable scenario was either a populist coalition (including M5S and Lega), a leftist coalition (including M5S and PD) or repeat elections. On 5 March, Renzi announced that the Democratic Party will be in the opposition during this legislature and he will resign as party leader when a new cabinet is formed. Following controversies within his party, Renzi resigned with immediate effect and on 12 March his deputy secretary Maurizio Martina was appointed acting secretary. On 6 March, Salvini repeated his campaign message that his party would refuse any coalition with the M5S. On 14 March, Salvini nonetheless offered to govern with the M5S, imposing the condition that League ally Forza Italia, led by ex-premier Silvio Berlusconi, must also take part in any coalition. Di Maio rejected this proposal on the grounds that Salvini was "choosing restoration instead of revolution" because "Berlusconi represents the past". Moreover, a Five Star prominent figure, Alessandro Di Battista, denied any possibility of an alliance with Forza Italia, describing Berlusconi as the "pure evil of our country".

The consultations between the Italian President and the political parties on 4 and 5 April failed to provide a candidate for Prime Minister, forcing the President Mattarella to hold another round of consultation between 11 and 12 April 2018.

On 7 April, Di Maio made an appeal to the Democratic Party to "bury the hatchet" and consider a governing coalition with his party. However, the Democrats stated that they will be at the opposition in this Legislature.

On 18 April 2018 Mattarella gave the President of the Senate, Elisabetta Casellati, the task to try and reconcile the issues between the Centre-right and the Five Star Movement, in order to break the post-election political deadlock and form a fully functional new government. However, she failed in finding a solution to the contrasts between the two groups, especially between the M5S and Forza Italia.

On 23 April 2018, after the failure of Casellati, Mattarella gave an exploratory mandate to the President of the Chamber of Deputies, Roberto Fico, to try to create a political agreement between the Five Star Movement and the Democratic Party. Some prominent leaders of the Democratic party, including acting secretary Martina, publicly considered the possibility of an agreement, while former PD's leader Matteo Renzi expressed his dissent along with other members of the party close to him. A National Directorate of the party to discuss the matter was set to take place on 3 May. On 30 April, following an interview of Matteo Renzi who expressed his strong opposition to an alliance with the M5S, Di Maio called for new elections.

A Tecné poll in the aftermath of the 2018 Italian general election suggested that 56% of M5S voters preferred a government coalition between the M5S and the League. A coalition between the Five Star Movement and the centre-right as a whole was preferred by only 4%. 22% preferred a coalition between the Five Star Movement, the centre-left Democratic Party and the left-wing LeU. A technocratic government was only supported by 1% of the Movement's voters.

On 7 May, President Mattarella held a third round of government formation talks, after which he formally confirmed the lack of any possible majority (M5S rejecting an alliance with the whole centre-right coalition, PD rejecting an alliance with both M5S and the centre-right coalition, and the League's Matteo Salvini refusing to start a government with M5S but without Berlusconi's Forza Italia party, whose presence in the government was explicitly vetoed by M5S's leader Luigi Di Maio); on the same circumstance, he announced his intention to soon appoint a "neutral government" (irrespective of M5S and League's refusal to support such an option) to take over from the Gentiloni Cabinet which was considered unable to lead Italy into a second consecutive election as it was representing a majority from a past legislature, and offering an early election in July (on what it would be the very first time for a summer general election in Italy) as a realistic option to take into consideration due to the deadlock situation. The League and the M5S agreed to hold new elections on 8 July, an option that was rejected by all other parties.

=== Conte cabinet's first failed formation ===
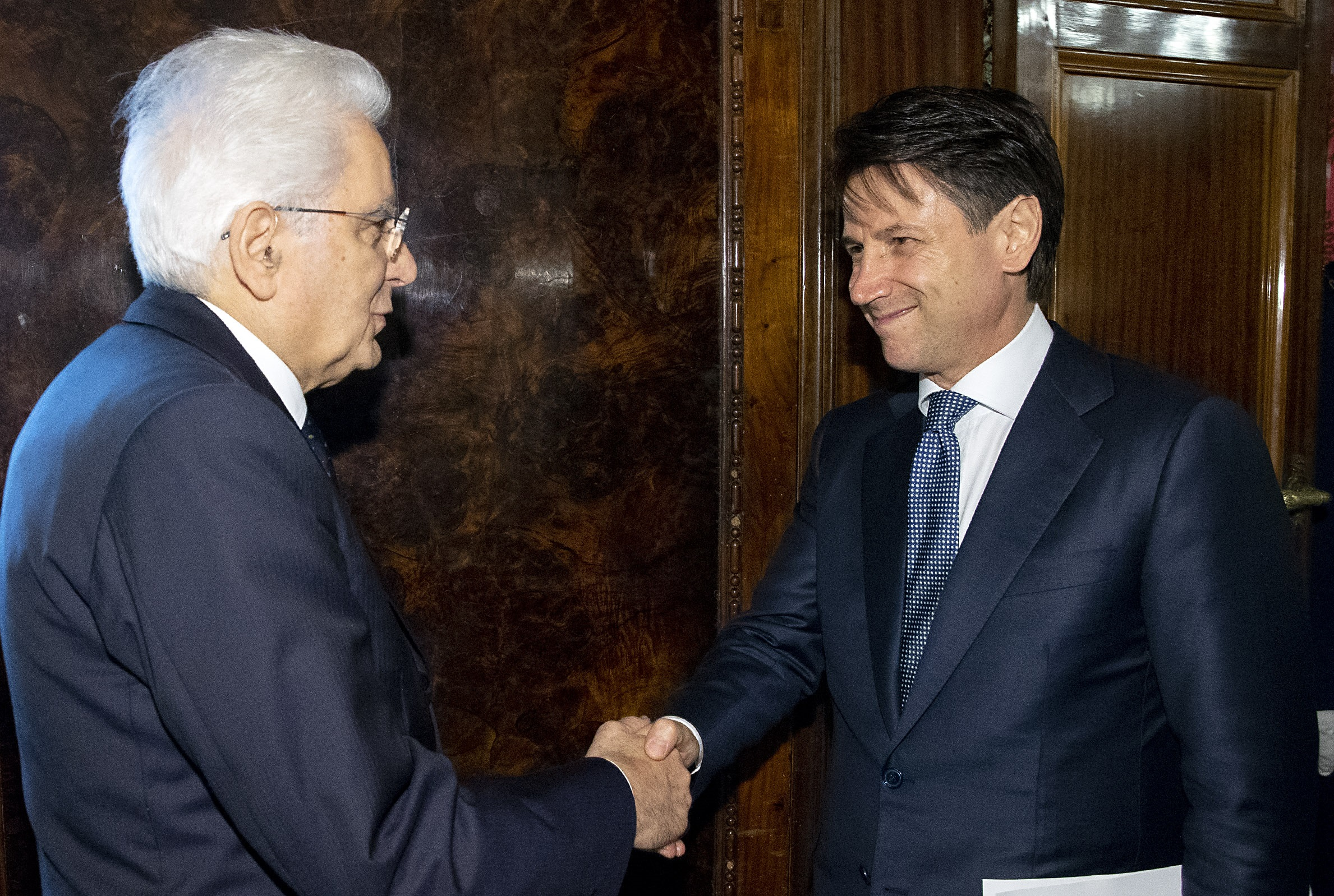
Giuseppe Conte with President Sergio Mattarella at the Quirinal Palace.

On 9 May, after a day of rumours, both M5S and the League officially requested President Mattarella to give them 24 more hours to strike a government agreement between the two parties. Later the same day, in the evening, Silvio Berlusconi publicly announced Forza Italia would not support an M5S-League government during votes of confidence, but he would still maintain the centre-right alliance nonetheless, thus opening the doors to a possible majority government between the two parties.

On 13 May, the Five Star Movement and the League reached an agreement in principle on a program called "Contract for the government of change" (Italian: Contratto per il governo del cambiamento), likely clearing the way for the formation of a governing coalition between the two parties, but could not find an agreement regarding the members of a government cabinet, most importantly the prime minister. M5S and League leaders met with Italian President Sergio Mattarella on 14 May to guide the formation of a new government. On their meeting with President Mattarella, both parties asked for an additional week of negotiations to agree on a detailed government program and a prime minister to lead the joint government. Both M5S and the League announced their intention to ask their respective members to vote on the government agreement by the weekend.

On 17 May, the Five Star Movement and the League agreed to the details on the government program, officially clearing the way for a governing coalition between the two parties. The final draft of their program was then published on 18 May.

On 18 May, 44,796 members of the Five Star Movement cast their vote online on the matter concerning the government agreement, with 42,274, more than 94%, voting in favour. A second vote sponsored by the League then took place on 19 May and 20 May and was open to the general public. On 20 May it was announced that approximately 215,000 Italian citizens had participated in the League election, with around 91 per cent supporting the government agreement.

On 21 May, the Five Star Movement and the League proposed law professor Giuseppe Conte as Prime Minister. On 23 May, Conte was invited to the Quirinal Palace to receive the task of forming a new cabinet and was granted a mandate by Italian President Mattarella. The next day, Conte held talks with all parties represented in Parliament. An impasse occurred over the League's nomination of Paolo Savona for Economy Minister, due to Savona's support for withdrawing Italy from the euro, presenting a risk for the country's economy. As a result, Savona was opposed by President Mattarella.

On 27 May, after days of negotiation and an ultimatum from Salvini and Di Maio regarding Savona, President Mattarella refused to approve the appointment of Savona as Finance Minister, and Conte gave up on the task of forming a government.

=== Cottarelli cabinet ===
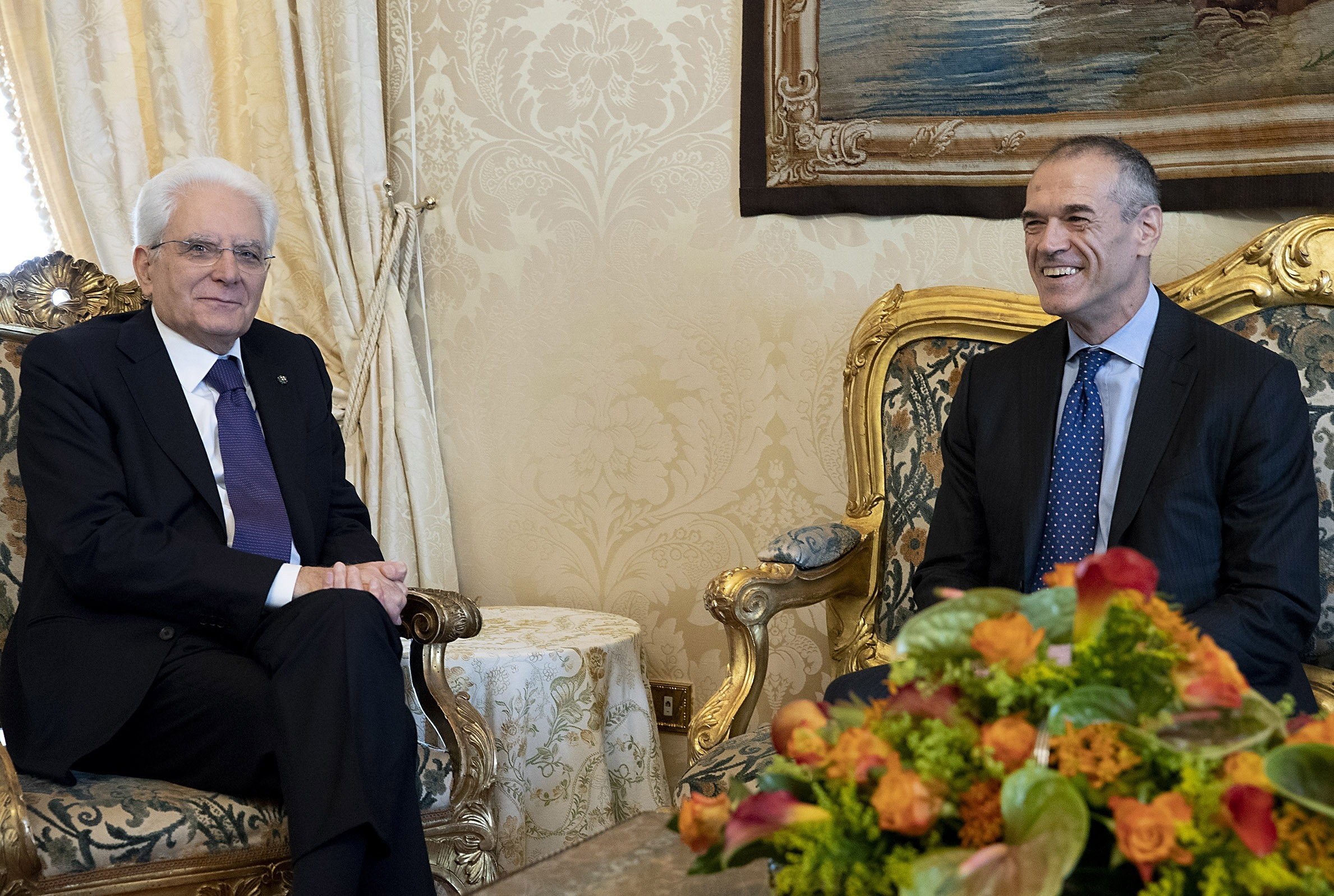
Carlo Cottarelli with President Sergio Mattarella at the Quirinal Palace.

Mattarella subsequently called Carlo Cottarelli to the Quirinal Palace on 28 May with the intention of giving him the task of forming a new government.

In the statement released after the designation, Cottarelli specified that, with a vote of confidence by the Parliament, he would pass a budget law for 2019, then have the Parliament dissolved and a new general election called for the beginning of 2019. On the other hand, without the confidence of Parliament, the government would deal only with "current affairs" and lead the country toward new elections after August 2018. Cottarelli also guaranteed the neutrality of his government and committed not to run in the next election. He ensured a prudent management of Italian national debt and the defence of national interests through a constructive dialogue with the European Union.

The appointing of Cottarelli sparked furious reaction from the leadership of the Five Star Movement, who accused Mattarella of committing a coup d'état against the will of the Italian people. On the evening of 27 May 2018 Di Maio announced that the M5S would initiate an impeachment procedure against President Mattarella for attempting to overthrow the Constitution; Giorgia Meloni, leader of Brothers of Italy, also announced an impeachment procedure against Mattarella for high treason. The move sparked a constitutional crisis: the Democratic Party announced for a demonstration in defence of Mattarella, denouncing Di Maio and Salvini as "authoritarian subsersives", while the Five Star Movement also announced a demonstration against Mattarella, calling him "antidemocratic".

On 28 May 2018, the Democratic Party announced that it would have voted in favor of Cottarelli's government during confidence votes, while the Five Star Movement and the centre-right parties (Forza Italia, Brothers of Italy, and the League) announced they would have voted against the government.

On 30 May 2018, Di Maio reversed his previous position, dropping the proposal of impeachment against President Mattarella, ending the crisis. Di Maio also formally announced his willingness to drop Paolo Savona from the previously proposed office of Minister of Economy in order to move him to a different and less sensitive government post; consequently, President Mattarella and Cottarelli jointly agreed on giving M5S and the League more time to develop a new political agreement featuring a Minister for Economy approved by the President of the Republic.

=== Final government agreement ===
After these developments, on 31 May 2018 Di Maio, Salvini and presumptive Prime Minister Conte met in Rome to discuss a new list of government ministers. Later in the afternoon, all parties announced publicly that they had agreed upon the composition of a new government with Giuseppe Conte as Prime Minister and Professor Giovanni Tria newly proposed as Minister of Economy in place of Paolo Savona, who was instead destined to be the new Minister of European Affairs (a minister without portfolio); it was also confirmed national-conservative right wing party Brothers of Italy, led by Giorgia Meloni and League's ally in the March election, would abstain during the investiture confidence votes (switching from their previous intention to be part of the opposition).

Following this agreement, Cottarelli resigned from his mandate to form a government, and Conte was again formally invited by President Mattarella to form a government, which he promptly announced following his meeting at the Quirinal Palace. The Conte Cabinet, with Di Maio and Salvini as joint deputy prime ministers, was formally sworn in on 1 June 2018.

=== Investiture votes ===
On 5 June 2018, the Senate approved the Conte Cabinet, with 171 votes in favor and 117 votes against (25 senators abstained; 7 senators did not vote, among which 6 were absent). Senators for life Elena Cattaneo, Mario Monti and Liliana Segre abstained while senators for life Carlo Rubbia, Renzo Piano and Giorgio Napolitano did not vote. On 6 June 2018, the Chamber of Deputies approved the Conte Cabinet with 350 votes in favor and 236 votes against (35 deputies abstained; 8 deputies did not vote, among which 5 were absent).

5–6 June 2018 Investiture votes for Conte Cabinet
House of Parliament	Vote	Parties	Votes
Senate of the Republic	Yes	M5S (109), League (58), MAIE (2), Independents (2)	171 / 313
Senate of the Republic	No	FI (57), PD (52), LeU (4), AUT. (2), PSI (1), +E (1)	117 / 313
Senate of the Republic	Abstention	FdI (18), AUT. (5), Independents (2)	25 / 313
Chamber of Deputies	Yes	M5S (220), League (123), MAIE (6), FI (1)	350 / 621
Chamber of Deputies	No	PD (111), FI (104), LeU (14), CP–AP–PSI–AC (4), NcI (3), +E–CD (3)	236 / 621
Chamber of Deputies	Abstention	FdI (30), SVP-PATT (4), USEI (1)	35 / 621

== See also ==
- 2019 Italian government crisis
- 2021 Italian government crisis
- 2022 Italian general election
- 2022 Italian government crisis
- 2022 Italian government formation
