= 2019 Italian government crisis =

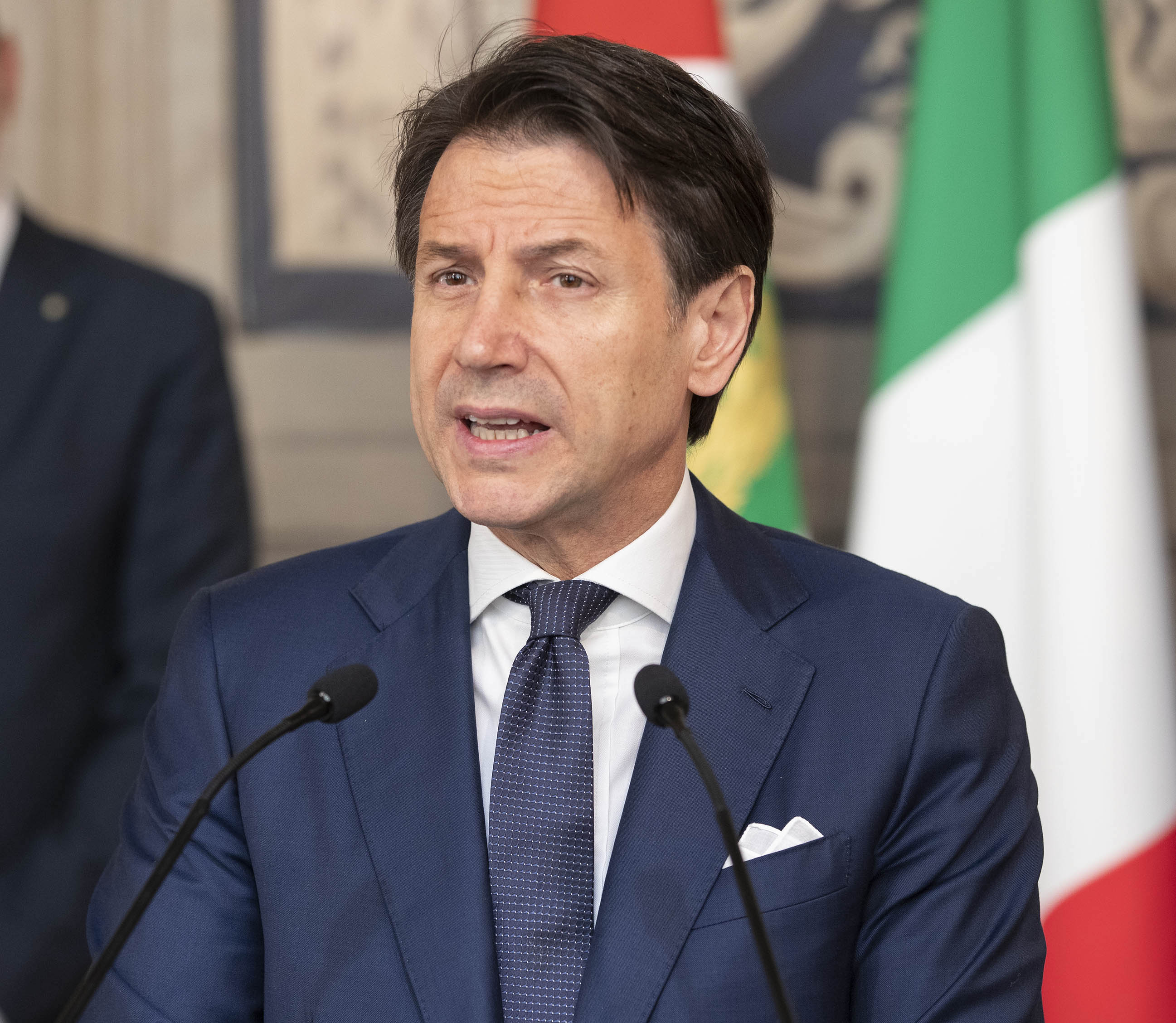
- Giuseppe Conte at the Quirinal Palace
- Date: 8 August 2019 – 5 September 2019
- Location: Italy
- Type: Parliamentary crisis and government formation
- Cause: Withdrawal of League's support to Giuseppe Conte's government
- Participants: M5S, Lega, FI, PD, FdI, LeU, Aut, Mixed Group
- Outcome: Resignation of Giuseppe Conte; Formation of the Conte II Cabinet

The 2019 Italian government crisis was a political event in Italy that occurred between August and September 2019. It includes the events that follow the announcement of the Minister of the Interior and leader of the League, Matteo Salvini, that he would revoke League's support of the cabinet and ask the President of the Republic to call a snap election. This provoked the resignation of Prime Minister Giuseppe Conte, and resulted in the formation of a new cabinet led by Conte himself.

== Background ==
In the 2018 Italian general election, no political group or party won an outright majority, resulting in a hung parliament. On 4 March, the centre-right alliance, in which Matteo Salvini's League emerged as the main political force, won a plurality of seats in the Chamber of Deputies and in the Senate, while the anti-establishment Five Star Movement (M5S) led by Luigi Di Maio became the party with the largest number of votes. The centre-left coalition, led by Matteo Renzi, came third. As a result, protracted negotiations were required before a new government could be formed.

The talks between the Five Star Movement and the League resulted in the proposal of the so-called "government of change" under the leadership of university professor Giuseppe Conte, a law professor close to the M5S. After some dispute with President Sergio Mattarella, Conte's cabinet, which was dubbed by the media as Western Europe's "first all-populist government", was sworn in on 1 June.

== Political crisis ==
In August 2019, Deputy Prime Minister Salvini announced he would file a motion of no confidence against Conte, after growing tensions within the majority. Salvini's move came right after a vote in the Senate regarding the progress of the Turin–Lyon high-speed railway, in which the Lega voted against an attempt of the M5S to block the construction works. Many political analysts believe the no confidence motion was an attempt to force early elections to improve Lega's standing in Parliament, ensuring Salvini could become the next prime minister. On 20 August, Conte announced his resignation; earlier the same day, he had spoken in Parliament against Salvini, accusing him of being a political opportunist who "had triggered the political crisis only to serve his personal interest",

== Government formation ==
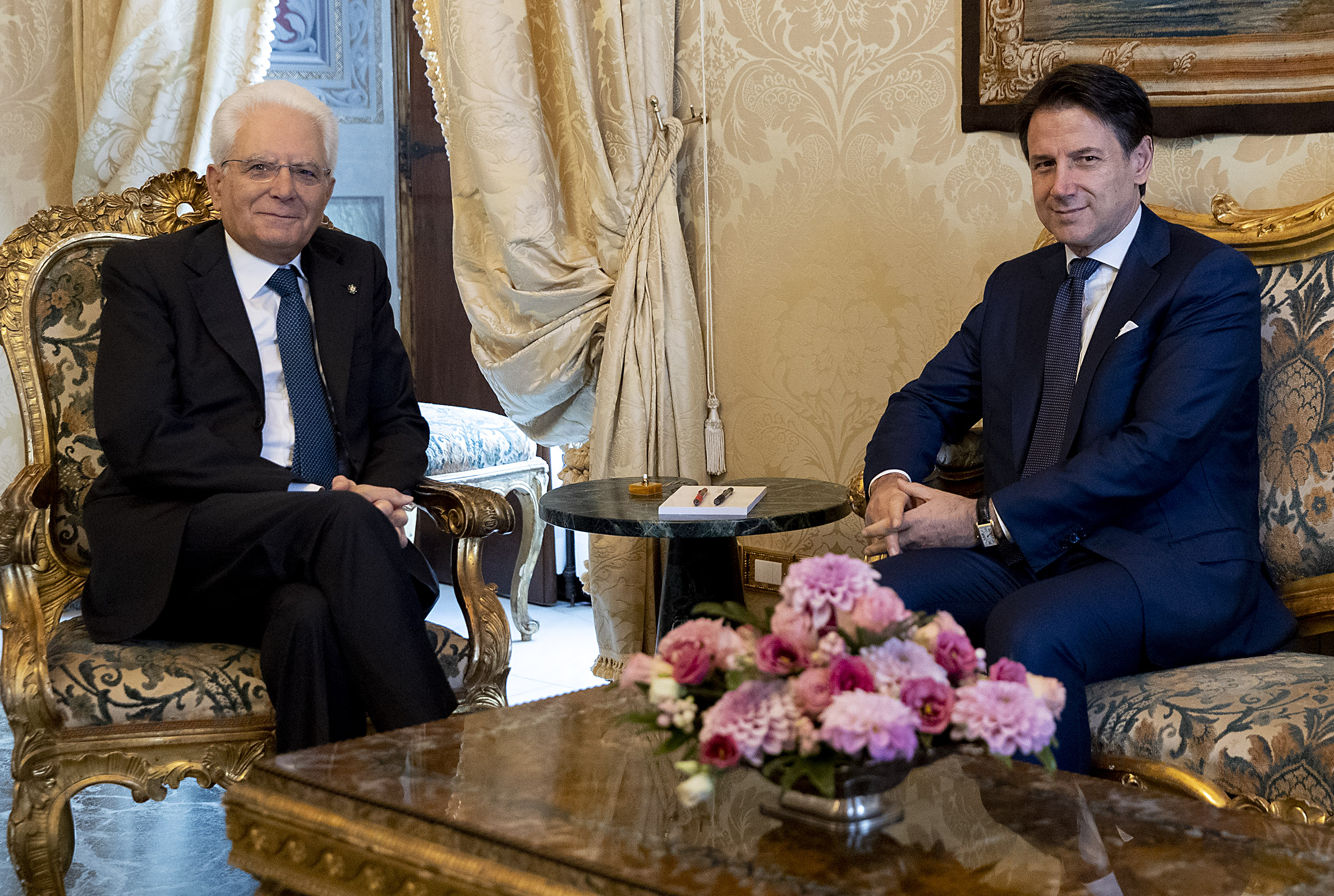
Conte with President Sergio Mattarella at the Quirinal Palace in August 2019

On 21 August, Mattarella started consultating parliamentary groups, with the aim of understanding whether a new Government could be formed.

On the following days, PD and M5S started working on an agreement framework, while left-wing party Free and Equal (LeU) announced that it would support a potential M5S–PD cabinet. On 28 August, PD's leader Nicola Zingaretti announced that his party and the M5S had reached an agreement to form a coalition Government, with pro-Europeanism, green politics, sustainable development, and a progressive outlook to economic inequality and immigration reform as its guiding principles, and Giuseppe Conte as prime minister. On the same day, Mattarella summoned Conte to the Quirinal Palace and formally gave him the task of forming a new cabinet.

=== Approval by M5S membership ===
On 1 September, Five Star's founder Beppe Grillo gave his endorsement to an alliance with the PD, describing it as a "unique occasion" to reform the country. After two days, on 3 September, the Five Star Movement granted its members the possibility of voting online on the agreement the M5S had reached with the PD; out of nearly 80,000 voters, over 79% were in favor.

Choice	Votes	%
Yes	63,146	79.3%
No	16,488	20.7%
Total	79,634	100.0%
Registered voters/turnout	117,194	68.0%
Sources: Associazione Rousseau

=== Investiture votes ===
The Government won a vote of confidence in the Chamber of Deputies on 9 September 2019 with 343 votes in favour, 263 against and 3 abstentions, and in the Senate the following day with 169 votes in favor and 133 against.

9–10 September 2019 Investiture votes for Conte II Cabinet
House of Parliament	Vote	Parties	Votes
Chamber of Deputies (Voting: 609 (Note: Absent (16): FI (4), Lega (3), M5S (3), PD (2), FdI (1), Others (3) On institutional leave (4): M5S (4)) of 630, Majority: 304)	Yes	M5S (208), PD (109), LeU (14), CP–AP–PSI–AC (4), +Eu–CD (3), Others (5)	343 / 609
Chamber of Deputies (Voting: 609 of 630, Majority: 304)	No	Lega (121), FI (95), FdI (33), NcI–USEI (4), Others (10)	263 / 609
Chamber of Deputies (Voting: 609 of 630, Majority: 304)	Abstention	SVP–PATT (3)	3 / 609
Senate of the Republic (Voting: 307 (Note: Absent (8): FI (5), M5S (1), Others (2) On institutional leave (5): M5S (1), PD (1), Lega (1), Aut (1), Others (1) President (1)) of 321, Majority: 152)	Yes	M5S (104), PD (49), Aut (4), LeU (4), Others (8)	169 / 307
Senate of the Republic (Voting: 307 of 321, Majority: 152)	No	Lega (57), FI (56), FdI (18), +Eu (1), Others (1)	133 / 307
Senate of the Republic (Voting: 307 of 321, Majority: 152)	Abstention	Aut (3), M5S (1), PD (1)	5 / 307

== Reactions ==
European Union

- European Commission President Jean Claude Juncker sent a letter of congratulations to Giuseppe Conte, adding "I am convinced that Italy will be able to play an important role in addressing European challenges".
- European Commission vice-president Frans Timmermans said that the Conte II cabinet is "good for Europe" and he "can't wait, really, to work with the new government".
- European Central Bank president nominee Christine Lagarde praised the candidacy of Roberto Gualtieri as Minister of Economy and Finance, adding it would be "good for Italy and Europe"
- European Commissioner for Economic and Financial Affairs, Taxation and Customs Pierre Moscovici congratulated Roberto Gualtieri for being appointed as Minister of Economy and Finance: "Looking forward to seeing you in Helsinki and to working closely with you in the coming weeks."
- European Parliament president David Sassoli tweeted "Italy’s stability is of importance to the EU. I wish the new government the best and look forward to meeting them in Brussels."
- European Parliament president of the Progressive Alliance of Socialists and Democrats Iratxe García cheered the new government "that places Italy back at the table of those willing to build a stronger and reformed Europe".

United States

- President of the United States Donald Trump, during the days the two parties were looking for an agreement, praised Giuseppe Conte and hoped he would "hopefully remain Prime Minister".

== See also ==
- 2018 Italian government formation
- 2008 Italian political crisis
- 2021 Italian government crisis
- 2022 Italian government crisis
