= 2021 Italian government crisis =

Government crisis in Italy

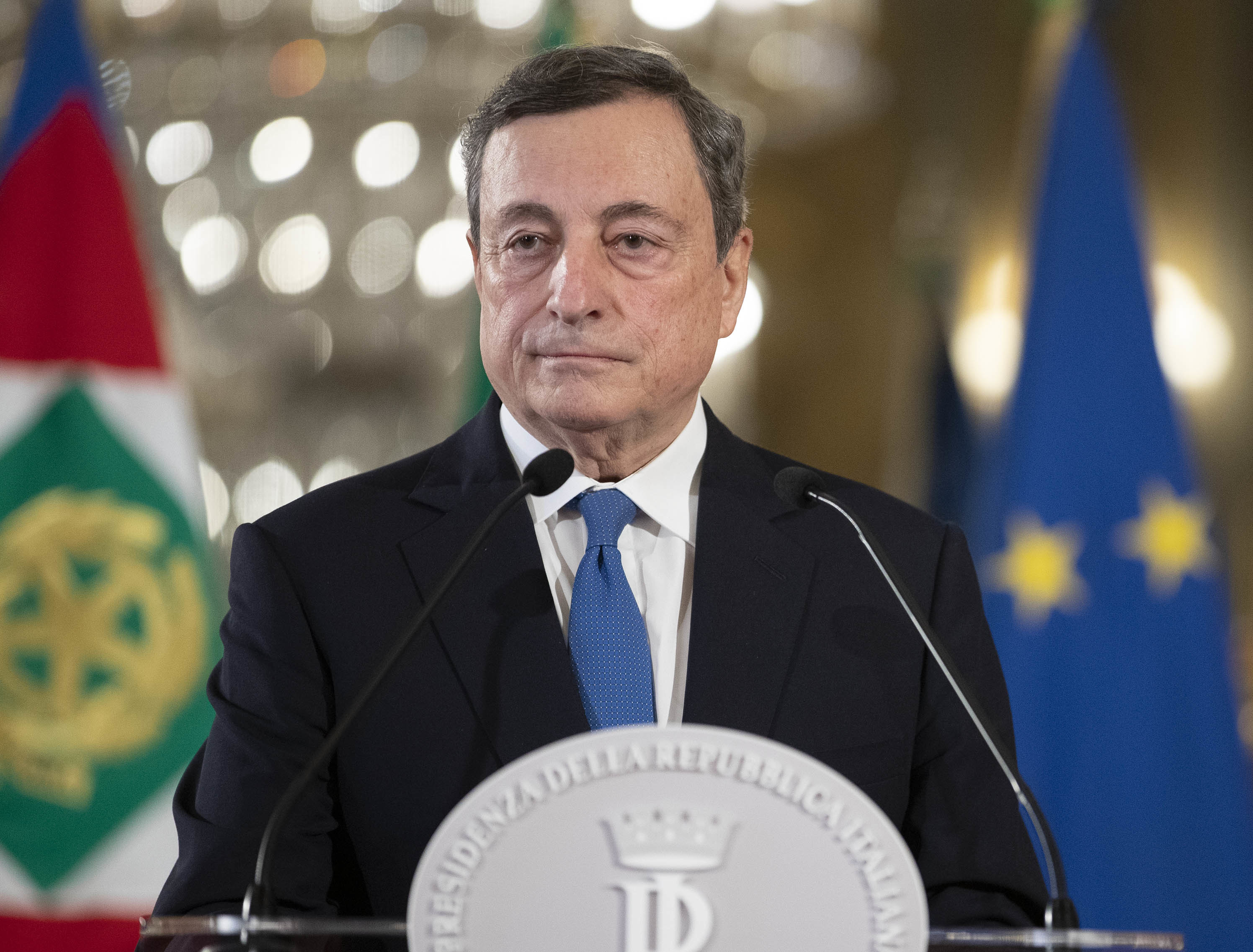
- Mario Draghi accepting the task of forming a new government
- Date: 13 January 2021 – 18 February 2021
- Location: Italy
- Type: Parliamentary crisis
- Cause: Withdrawal of Italia Viva's support to Giuseppe Conte's government
- Participants: M5S, Lega, FI, PD, FdI, IV, LeU, Aut, Mixed Group
- Outcome: Confidence votes won by the government, without an absolute majority in the Senate; Resignation of Giuseppe Conte; Formation of the Draghi Cabinet

The 2021 Italian government crisis was a political event in Italy that began in January 2021 and ended the following month. It includes the events that follow the announcement of Matteo Renzi, leader of Italia Viva (IV) and former Prime Minister, that he would revoke IV's support to the Government of Giuseppe Conte.

On 18 and 19 January, confidence votes were held in both Houses of Parliament; the Government managed to win both, but fell short of an absolute majority in the Senate due to IV Senators abstaining.

On 26 January, Conte offered his resignation as Prime Minister; President Sergio Mattarella consequently started consultations for the formation of a new Government, which ultimately resulted in Mario Draghi being sworn in as Prime Minister on 13 February.

== Background ==
The 2018 general election produced a hung parliament. After long negotiations, a coalition was finally formed on 1 June between two populist parties, centrist Five Star Movement (M5S) and right-wing League, led by the M5S-linked independent Giuseppe Conte as Prime Minister. This coalition ended with Conte's resignation on 20 August 2019 after the League withdrew its support of the government. In September 2019, a new government was formed between the M5S and two left-wing parties, the Democratic Party (PD) and Free and Equal (LeU), retaining Giuseppe Conte at its head. On 16 September, a few days from the investiture vote, in an interview with la Repubblica, former Prime Minister Matteo Renzi announced his intention to leave the PD, launching a new centrist and liberal party named Italia Viva (IV). In the interview, he confirmed continued support of Conte's government. Two ministers, Teresa Bellanova and Elena Bonetti, and one undersecretary, Ivan Scalfarotto, followed Renzi to his new movement.

== Political crisis ==
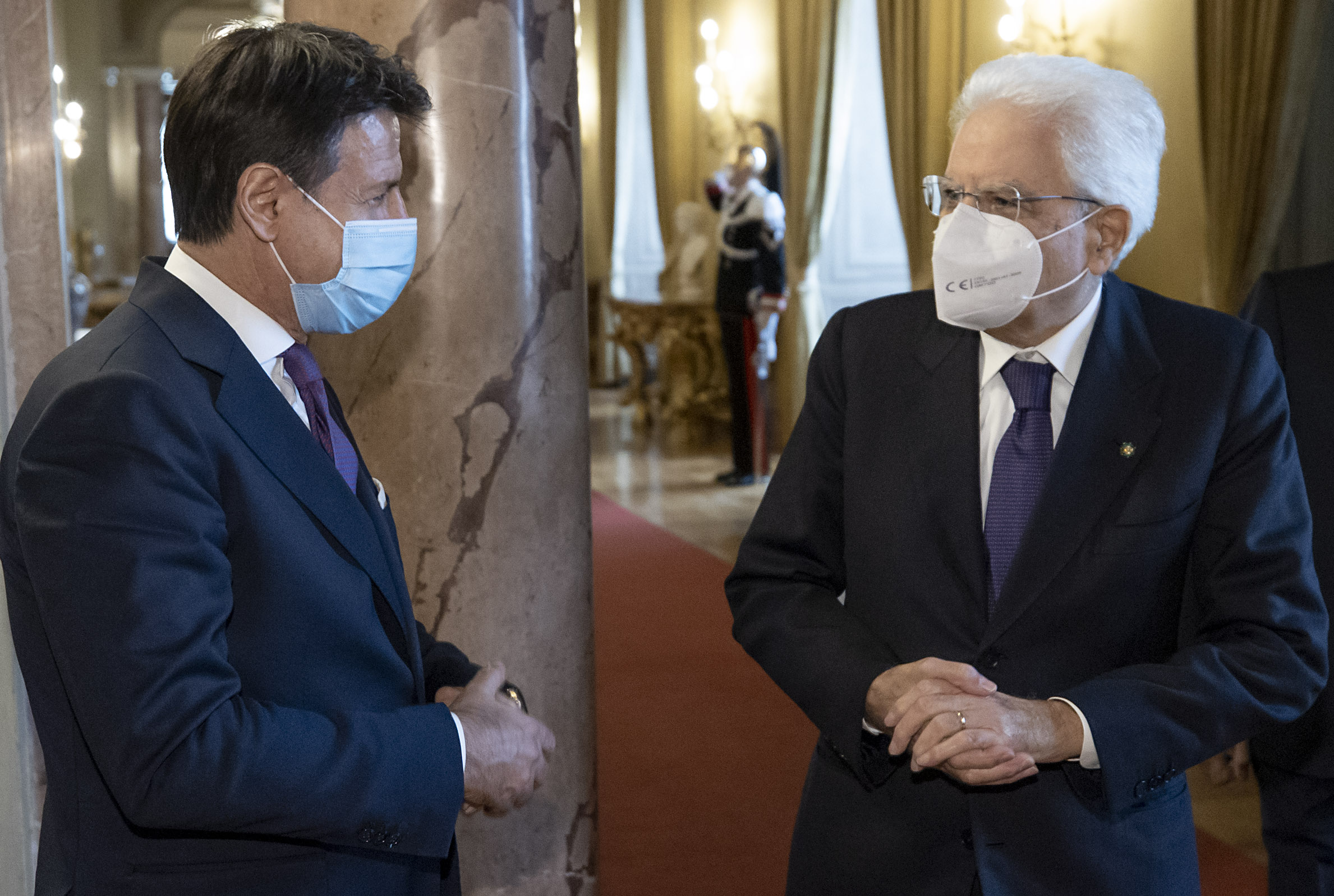
Giuseppe Conte and Sergio Mattarella at the Quirinal Palace

Between December 2020 and January 2021, discussions arose within the government coalition between Conte and Matteo Renzi, former Prime Minister and leader of Italia Viva. Renzi called for radical changes to the government's economic recovery plans after the COVID-19 pandemic, and also demanded that Conte cede his mandate over the secret services coordination task. During his end-of-year press conference, Conte declined Renzi's requests, asserting that he still had a majority in the Parliament.

On 13 January, during a press conference, Renzi announced the resignation of IV's two ministers, effectively triggering the collapse of Conte's government. Renzi stated: "We will not allow any Prime Minister to have full and unrestricted powers. [...] We are facing a dramatic emergency, but a Government should not be kept alive just because of that. If we are to build a serious response to the pandemic, we must unblock construction sites and act on industrial policies. There is a reason that in Italy we the highest number of deaths and an ever-collapsing GDP"

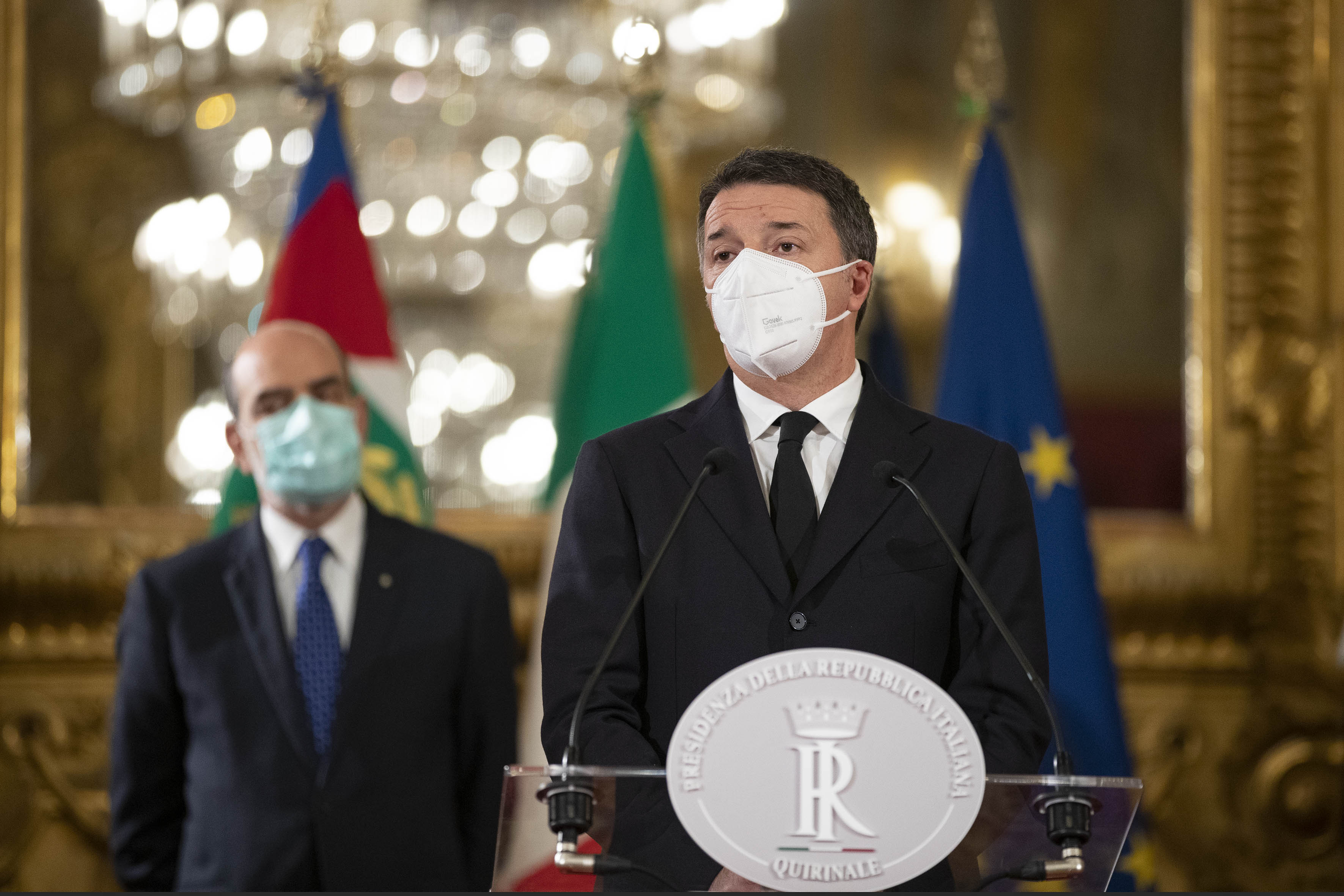
Matteo Renzi at the Quirinal Palace for the consultations

During a late-night Council of Ministers, Conte strongly criticised Renzi, stating that "Italia Viva has assumed the serious responsibility of opening a government crisis. I am sincerely sorry for the considerable damage that has been done to our country by a government crisis in the midst of a pandemic. [...] The gravity of this decision cannot be diminished." The Prime Minister was soon backed by the secretary of the Democratic Party, Nicola Zingaretti, who labeled the crisis as a "very serious mistake against Italy" and "an act against our country", while the Minister of Culture, Dario Franceschini, head of the Democratic delegation in the government, stated: "Whoever attacks the Prime Minister, attacks the entire government; Giuseppe Conte has been serving the country with passion and dedication against the most serious challenges we've ever faced in the history of our Republic". The Minister of Foreign Affairs and former leader of the M5S, Luigi Di Maio, described Renzi's decision as a "reckless move", asserting that "Prime Minister Conte and President Sergio Mattarella are the only two pillars Italy has in this moment of uncertainty"; while Roberto Speranza, Minister of Health and de facto leader of Free and Equal (LeU), said that Conte "has served the country with discipline and honor", adding that LeU still supported him. Moreover, many other prominent members of the cabinet like Stefano Patuanelli, Alfonso Bonafede, Vincenzo Spadafora and Riccardo Fraccaro expressed their support to Conte. The opposition leaders, Matteo Salvini and Giorgia Meloni, immediately asked for snap elections.

On 15 January, Conte announced that he would report about the government crisis in Parliament in the following week. On that occasion, he would also seek for a confidence vote to understand whether his Government still enjoyed parliamentary support.

=== Vote of confidence in Conte's Government ===
On 18 January, the Chamber of Deputies passed a motion of confidence in the Government with 321 votes in favour, 259 against and 27 abstentions. The next day, the Government won a confidence vote in the Senate as well, but fell short of the 161 votes needed to achieved an absolute majority. Of the 312 Senators present, 156 voted in favor and 140 against, while 16 abstained;

In both houses of Parliament, Italia Viva abstained. The Government also received support from a few MPs belonging to opposition parties, such as three MPs from Forza Italia and one from More Europe.

18–19 January 2021 Confidence votes for Conte II Cabinet
House of Parliament	Vote	Parties	Votes
Chamber of Deputies (Voting: 580 of 630, Majority: 290)	Yes	M5S (188), PD (93), LeU (12), CD (11), Mixed Group–Ind. (8), SVP–PATT (4), MAIE (3), IV (1), FI (1)	321 / 580
Chamber of Deputies (Voting: 580 of 630, Majority: 290)	No	Lega (125), FI (85), FdI (31), NcI–USEI–C! (9), +EU–Action (4), Mixed Group–Ind. (3), AP–PSI (2)	259 / 580
Chamber of Deputies (Voting: 580 of 630, Majority: 290)	Abstention	IV (27)	27 / 630
Senate of the Republic (Voting: 296 of 321, Majority: 148)	Yes	M5S (91), PD (35), Aut (8), Mixed Group–Ind. (8), LeU (6), MAIE (4), FI (2), PSI (1), +EU–Action (1)	156 / 296
Senate of the Republic (Voting: 296 of 321, Majority: 148)	No	Lega (62), FI–UDC (49), FdI (19), Mixed Group–Ind. (5), IdeA–C! (3), +EU–Action (2)	140 / 296
Senate of the Republic (Voting: 296 of 321, Majority: 148)	Abstention	IV (16)	16 / 321

=== Resignation of Conte and consultations ===
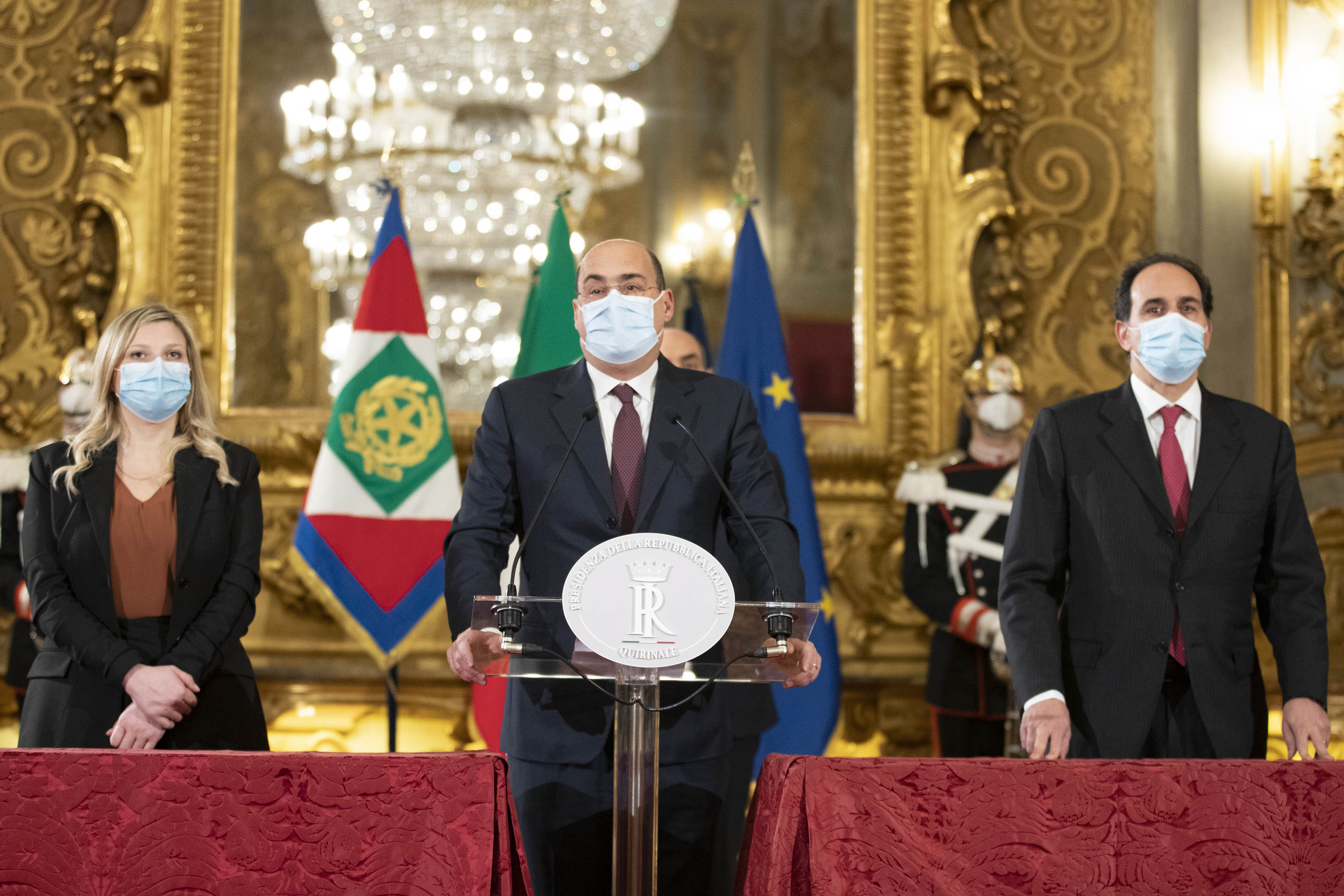
Nicola Zingaretti and the Democratic delegation at the Quirinal Palace for the consultations

On 26 January, after a few days of inconclusive negotiations with centrist and independent senators to regain an absolute majority in the Senate, Conte resigned as Prime Minister. On the following day, a new parliamentary group, known as Europeanists, was formed in the Senate in support of Conte. The group was composed by members of the Associative Movement Italians Abroad (MAIE) and other centrist and liberal senators.

On 27 January, the consultations with President Sergio Mattarella for the formation of a new cabinet began at the Quirinal Palace, meeting the presidents of the two houses, senator Elisabetta Casellati and Roberto Fico.

On 28 January, President Mattarella met the delegations of For the Autonomies, Free and Equal and the new-born Europeanists, which confirmed their supports to Conte, as well as various MPs of the Mixed Group. Matteo Renzi, which was received in the afternoon along with Italia Viva's delegation, opened to a new government with the same old majority, but he opposed giving the task of forming a new cabinet to Conte, while Nicola Zingaretti, leader of the PD, stressed the necessity of starting a new government with Conte at its head.

On 29 January, high-ranking members of the centre-right coalition (a conservative alliance between the League (Lega), Brothers of Italy (FdI), Forza Italia (FI) and other minor parties) met with President Mattarella. Matteo Salvini, leader of the League, asked for a snap election, but added that, under specific conditions, the centre-right could support a national unity government. Mattarella also spoke with interim leader of the Five Star Movement (M5S) Vito Crimi, who said he was open to grant of Matteo Renzi's requests in exchange for IV's support for new Conte-led Government. Alessandro Di Battista, leader of the anti-establishment wing of the M5S, criticized this statement, asserting he would leave the party if the latter agreed to allow Renzi's party back into the Government.

=== Further negotiations and Draghi's mandate ===
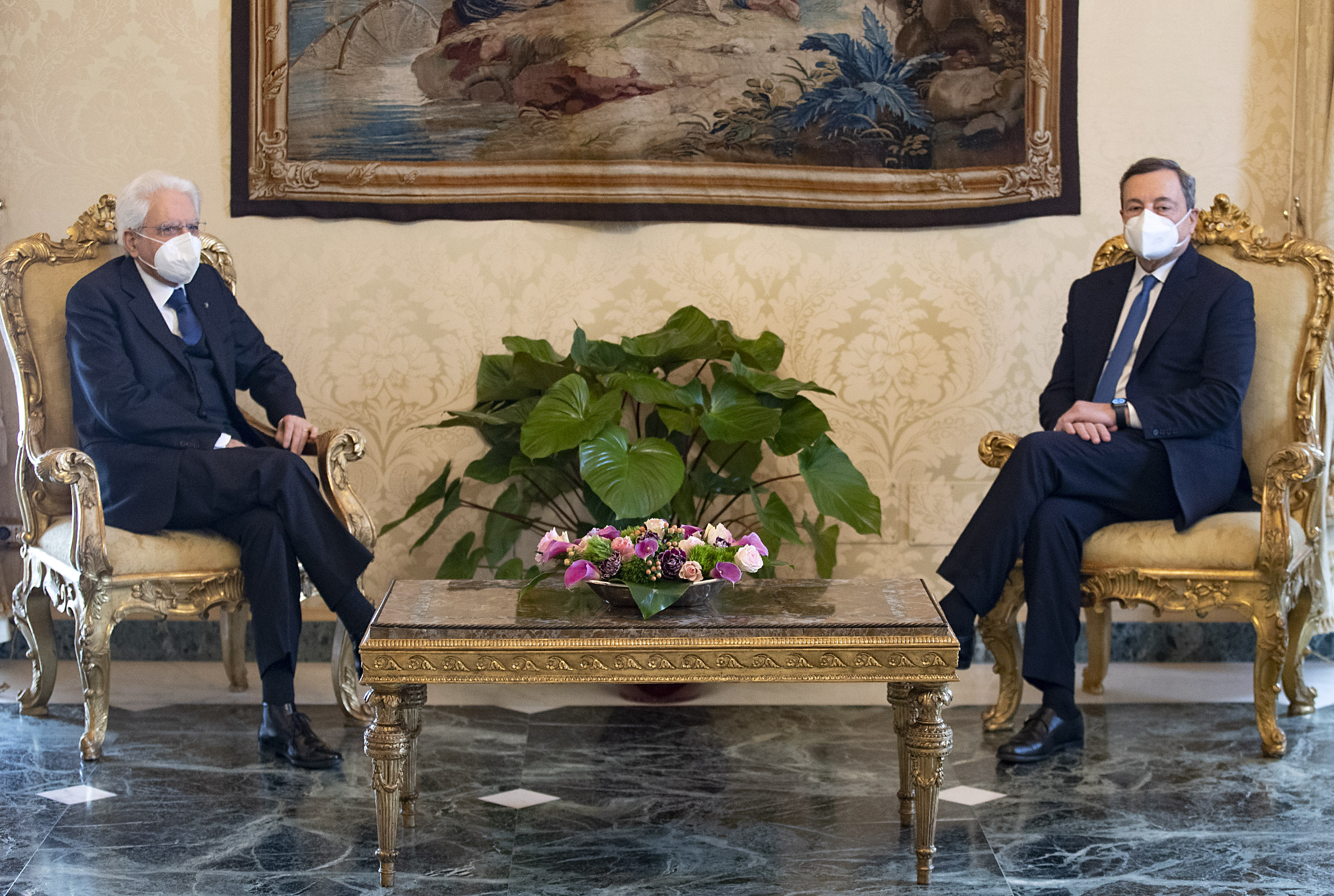
Sergio Mattarella and Mario Draghi at the Quirinal Palace in February 2021

At the end of the consultations, Mattarella gave President of the Chamber of Deputies Roberto Fico the task of verifying whether a new Government, backed with the same majority of the previous one (that is, a coalition between M5S, PD, IV and LeU) could be formed.

On the deadline day of 2 February, IV broke away from the majority due to disagreements on both platform and cabinet members; Fico consequently reported to Mattarella that an agreement had not been reached. Mattarella consequently decided to invite Mario Draghi for the next day at the Quirinal Palace with the intention to offer him the task to form a national unity technocratic government. On 3 February, Draghi officially accepted with reservation the task of forming a new cabinet and started consulting with the Presiding Officers of the two Houses of Parliament. On the same day, he also met Giuseppe Conte, who officially endorsed him the following day.

On 10 February Matteo Salvini and Silvio Berlusconi jointly announced, after a meeting, their support for Draghi. On the same day, FDI leader Giorgia Meloni distanced herself from Salvini and Berlusconi's statement, reaffirming her opposition to a Draghi-led Government.

On 11 February, the national leadership of the Democratic Party unanimously voted in favour of the formation of a new cabinet.

On the same day, the M5S asked its members to vote on the following question: "Should the Movement support a technical-political government that will include a super-ministry for Ecological Transition and will defend the main results achieved by the Movement, alongside the other political forces indicated by the appointed prime minister Mario Draghi?" The party's members approved the online referendum with 59.3% voting in favor. Alessandro Di Battista criticized the M5S' decision to join the new Government and left the party on 11 February 2021.

Choice	Votes	%
Yes	44,177	59.3%
No	30,360	40.7%
Total	74,537	100.0%
Registered voters/turnout	119,544	62.4%
Sources: Associazione Rousseau

=== Formation of Draghi's government ===
On the evening of 12 February, Draghi met with President Mattarella and presented the list of proposed ministers for his cabinet. The oath of office took place on 13 February, at 12:00 PM local time.

On 17 February 2021, the Senate approved the new cabinet with 262 votes in favour, 40 against and 2 abstentions. It was the second largest majority in the history of the Italian Republic. On 18 February 2021, the Chamber of Deputies approved the new cabinet with 535 votes in favour, 56 against and 5 abstentions.

17–18 February 2021 Investiture votes for Draghi Cabinet
House of Parliament	Vote	Parties	Votes
Senate of the Republic (Voting: 302 of 321, Majority: 152)	Yes	M5S (69), Lega–PSd'Az (62), FI–UDC (49), PD (35), IV–PSI (17), Eur–MAIE–CD (10), Aut (5), LeU (4), IdeA–C! (3), +Eu–Az (2), Others (6)	262 / 302
Senate of the Republic (Voting: 302 of 321, Majority: 152)	No	FdI (19), M5S (15), LeU (2), Others (4)	40 / 302
Senate of the Republic (Voting: 302 of 321, Majority: 152)	Abstention	Aut (1), Others (1)	2 / 321
Chamber of Deputies (Voting: 591 of 630, Majority: 296)	Yes	M5S (155), Lega (125), PD (91), FI (81), IV (28), CD (14), LeU (11), C! (10), NcI−USEI−AdC (5), SVP–PATT (4), Az–+Eu–RI (4), Eur–MAIE–PSI (2), Others (5)	535 / 591
Chamber of Deputies (Voting: 591 of 630, Majority: 296)	No	FdI (31), M5S (16), Lega (1), LeU (1), Others (7)	56 / 591
Chamber of Deputies (Voting: 591 of 630, Majority: 296)	Abstention	M5S (5)	5 / 630

== See also ==
- 2018 Italian general election
- 2018 Italian government formation
- 2008 Italian political crisis
- 2019 Italian government crisis
- 2022 Italian government crisis
