= 2018 German government crisis =

Former government crisis in Germany

The 2018 German government crisis, sometimes referred to as Asylstreit (asylum quarrel), was a government crisis affecting the Fourth Merkel cabinet, which began on 18 June 2018 and effectively ended on 4 July 2018.

== Background ==
Before the formation of a coalition government in March 2018, immigration policy had become an issue that prevented Angela Merkel obtaining a workable majority, with the Free Democratic Party declining to join a coalition and all potential coalition partners calling for stricter migration controls.

The coalition government agreement, made between Christian Democratic Union (CDU), its Bavarian sister party the Christian Social Union (CSU), and the Social Democratic Party (SPD), was not ratified by SPD members until 3 March 2018, more than five months after the September 2017 German Federal elections. The coalition agreement indicates that the parties intended to modify policies in relation to refugees and family reunification. "The previous government (also a CDU/CSU/SPD grand coalition) had suspended the right of refugees with a 'limited protection status' to bring their families over. The new coalition deal says this will be limited to 1,000 people per month. On top of that, the number of asylum-seekers taken in altogether is to be capped at between 180,000 and 220,000 per year."

== Incidents ==
=== June 2018 ===
In June 2018, the coalition government, especially the CDU/CSU sister parties, quarreled over the specifics of asylum policies. After the interior minister Horst Seehofer (CSU) had announced a "master plan" on asylum policies containing 63 points - of which 62 were reportedly agreed between Seehofer and chancellor Angela Merkel (CDU) - differences arose on the question of the rejection of asylum seekers already registered in other EU countries. After Seehofer threatened "national measures", meaning the closure of the borders for such asylum seekers, Merkel requested two weeks for talks on a "European solution" and convened an EU asylum policy summit on migration policies in the night of 28/29 June. The result of the summit was seen as a "vague" success for Merkel. The Visegrád Group, represented by the Hungarian prime minister, claimed that the EU was beginning to accept its proposals for dealing with asylum seekers.

Among other things, it was agreed that European governments are allowed to "take all necessary internal legislative and administrative measures" to prevent refugees and migrants from crossing Europe's internal borders. The Guardian called this "an apparent lifeline for Merkel". While Merkel claimed that she had reached agreements with Greece and Spain as well as commitments of 14 states on deportations of registered migrants, the Visegrád Group among them, the governments of the Czech Republic, Hungary, and Poland subsequently denied that there were new agreements.

It was also reported that there were personal differences between Merkel and Seehofer, the latter reportedly saying: "I can’t work with this woman any more!"

=== July 2018 ===
After the EU summit, German chancellor Angela Merkel faced resistance by the Bavarian CSU party over the result of the summit, and interior minister Horst Seehofer announced a "declaration" Sunday 1 July. Seehofer threatened to order "national measures" and reject migrants who are registered in other EU countries. It was reported that he considered talks with Merkel in Berlin on 30 June 2018 on the summit results as "ineffective" and "useless", stating that Merkel's plan would create new "pull factors" for asylum seekers to come to Europe. He also rejected a proposal by Merkel to accommodate asylum seekers who are already registered in EU countries in so-called "anchor centers" (Ankerzentren), which would allow quicker deportations.

Whilst Bavarian minister president Markus Söder stated that the summit result would point "in the right direction", the party leaders held a meeting in the CSU party headquarters in Munich on Sunday and voiced criticism of Merkel's plan. Merkel stated that she wants to avoid a breakup of the government and the historical parliamentary group with the Bavarian sister party.

On the evening of 1 July, interior minister Horst Seehofer reportedly offered the CSU party leadership his resignation over the conflict with Angela Merkel, but chose to stay in office for the time being, after party board members as Alexander Dobrindt convinced him to stay. New talks were agreed between CDU and CSU delegations for 1700 CET on 2 July in Berlin. Seehofer stated ahead of the talks: "I'm not going to get dismissed by a chancellor who's only chancellor because of me."

Later in the evening of 2 July, an agreement was made between the CDU/CSU sister parties. It contains the introduction of Transitzentren (transit centres) which allow quick deportations of asylum seekers already registered abroad without entering the country, and in specific cases the rejection of such people directly at the German border. To avoid that there is only a national approach, agreements with the European neighbours are also included. Seehofer announced that the agreement allows him to stay in office as Minister of the Interior. After the agreement between the sister parties, talks with the coalition partner SPD followed. Leading SPD politicians said that they had "many questions" about the agreement.

By 9 July, it was being reported that the ruling coalition had achieved a level of stability, leaving the government able to negotiate bilateral deals with other European countries. Meanwhile, talks commenced with Austria and Italy in an effort to close the Mediterranean migration routes from Africa to Europe.

== Reactions ==
- European Union: The President of the European Commission, Jean-Claude Juncker stated, the compromise was probably conform to European right, but will be examined by the Juristic Service of the European Commission.
- Austria: Austrian Chancellor Sebastian Kurz stated: "it hasn't become clear what Germany intends to do here." He wanted to wait and see if the compromise would become government policy. "Should this agreement thus become the German government position, we see ourselves forced to take action to avert disadvantages for Austria and its population."

== See also ==
- European migrant crisis
