= 2022 Estonian government crisis =

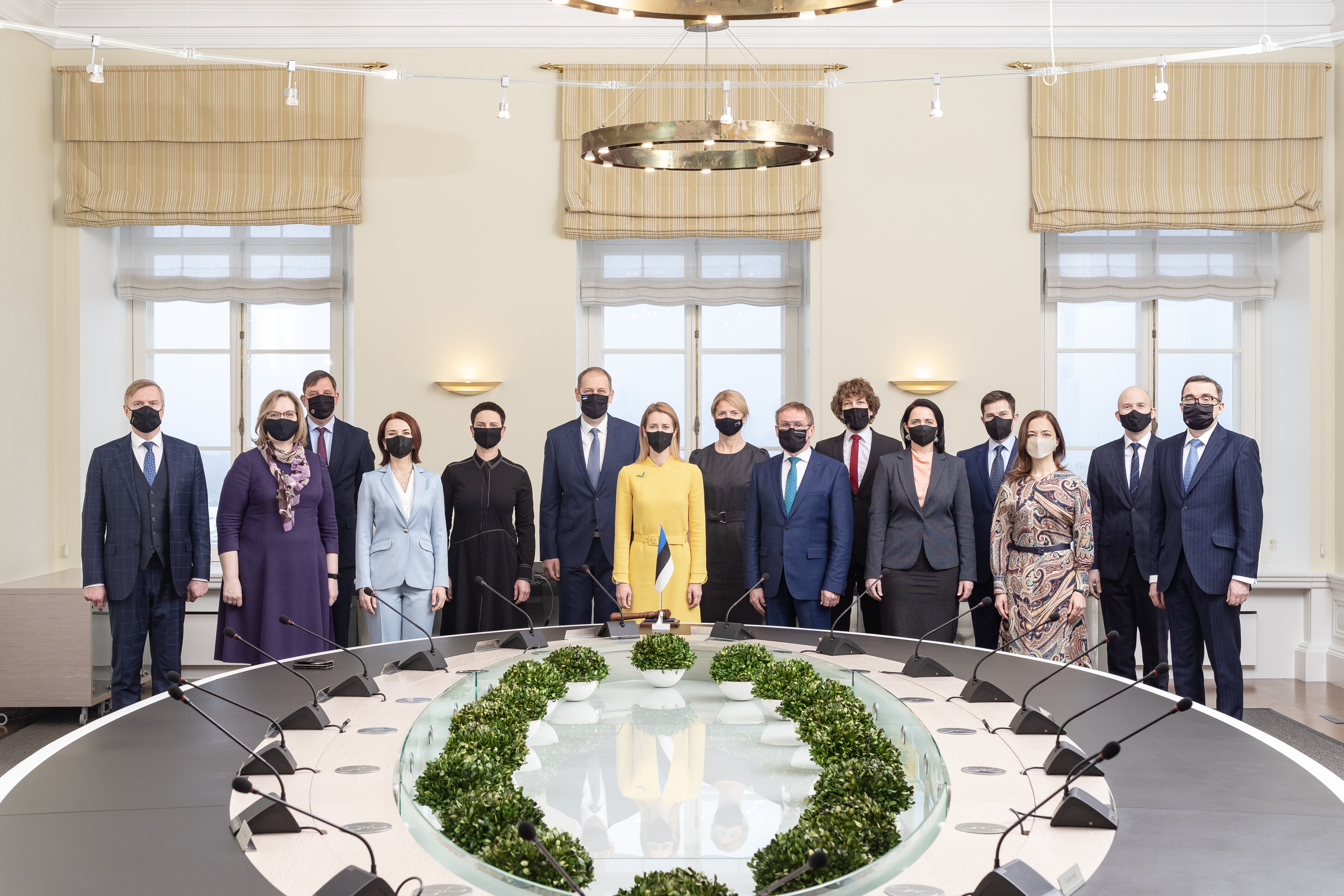
- Kaja Kallas' first cabinet being sworn in
- Date: May 2022 – 18 July 2022
- Location: Estonia
- Type: Parliamentary crisis
- Cause: Centre Party's proposed child benefits bill; Centre Party voting to withdraw the government's education reform bill; Centre Party wanting to form a new government coalition with EKRE and Isamaa (allegedly)
- Participants: Reform Party, Centre Party
- Outcome: Centre Party ministers removed from office, one-party Reform Party government from early June to mid-July; Dissolution of Kaja Kallas' first cabinet, formation of Kaja Kallas' second cabinet; Centre Party returning to opposition for the first time since 2016; Kaja Kallas continuing as prime minister
- Legislature status: Majority cabinet 59 / 101 (58%) (until 3 June 2022) Minority cabinet 34 / 101 (34%) (from 3 June 2022 to 18 July 2022) Majority cabinet 56 / 101 (55%) (from 18 July 2022)

The 2022 Estonian government crisis was a political event in Estonia that occurred between May and July 2022. It includes the events that follow the introduction of a child benefits bill by the governing Centre Party with the support of the opposition Isamaa, Social Democrats and EKRE but without the support of the senior partner in the coalition, the Reform Party.

The crisis was exacerbated after the Centre Party MPs voted down the education reform bill that had been put forward by the incumbent government of the Reform and Centre parties. It resulted in Prime Minister Kaja Kallas having Centre Party ministers removed from office and running a government of only Reform Party ministers until the inauguration of Kaja Kallas' second cabinet a month later.

== Background ==
The 2019 parliamentary election saw the loss of the absolute majority held by Jüri Ratas's first cabinet in the Riigikogu, the unicameral parliament of Estonia. Ratas's Centre Party, Isamaa, and the Social Democrats all suffered a setback in favour of the Reform Party, led by Kallas, and EKRE. Kersti Kaljulaid, then-president of Estonia, gave a mandate to Kallas to form a government after the election. The Reform Party negotiated with the Centre Party, Isamaa, and SDE but ultimately failed to form a government. After the vote in April 2019, Ratas received the mandate and successfully formed a government with Isamaa and EKRE. Jüri Ratas's second cabinet was sworn in on 29 April 2019.

In January 2021, the Centre Party-led government collapsed after a corruption investigation in which the Centre Party was accused of requesting financial support of up to €1 million within a year in return of the €39 million loan to Hillar Teder's real estate development in Tallinn. In response, Ratas resigned as prime minister of Estonia, while Kallas was invited to form a government. She struck a deal with the Centre Party, with Kallas serving as prime minister.

In January 2022 Jaanus Karilaid, the leader of the Centre Party's parliamentary faction, threatened a government crisis should the Reform Party fail to agree on subsidies to alleviate the then-ongoing energy crisis. An agreement was eventually reached in the same month.

== Political crisis ==
=== Proposal of the child benefits bill ===
On 12 May 2022, Karilaid put forward a bill to increase funding for child benefits with the support of MPs from all 3 opposition parties - EKRE, the Social Democrats and Isamaa - but without the support of the Centre Party's coalition partner, the Reform Party. Prime Minister Kaja Kallas of the Reform Party reacted on the same day by accusing the Centre Party of wanting to form a government with EKRE in response to a question about the coalition's health.

In general, it is still the case in politics that a government coalition sticks together. If you start doing things outside of the coalition, if you start cooperating with EKRE, then there is a desire to bring it into the EKRE government, there is no other explanation for it.

I don't see any other reason behind it, other than the desire to do something else and with someone else. But I would say, man up then, vote no confidence in me and make this coalition together. What are you messing around for?

— Kaja Kallas

Public Administration minister Jaak Aab of the Centre Party responded that he'd warned the parliamentary faction that putting forward the bill could cause the government to collapse and mentioned that this should've been agreed on beforehand. Aab, Karilaid and Centre Party leader Jüri Ratas all insisted that the goal was not to collapse the government. In response, Kaja Kallas stated that the Reform Party supports boosting child benefits spending but wants time to discuss the specific bill and ways to cover the budget expenses. Karilaid stated that he wanted the bill to be passed before 24 June, St. John's Day around when the Riigikogu, the national parliament of Estonia, goes on summer break.

On 24 May, Kaja Kallas stated that it had previously been discussed with the Centre Party that the increase in child benefits would be done as part of the budget process for 2023 and urged the Centre Party to try to find a solution inside the government, stating that otherwise the coalition cannot continue. She also raised the issue of Centre Party leader Ratas being difficult to contact due to being in parliament and not a government minister.

On the same day, the daily Eesti Päevaleht reported that several members of the Centre Party had privately complained about Karilaid moving forward with the child benefits bill without communicating with people outside of the party board and parliamentary faction, leaving some ministers and other key people out of the loop on the matter. While all Centre Party MPs had signed onto the bill, some mentioned in private that it had simply been done in advance. Karilaid conceded that communication could have been done better but insisted that the parliamentary faction was united. He urged Kaja Kallas to convene all party leaders to discuss improving the bill before it came to a vote in less than a week on 30 May.

On 26 May, Kaja Kallas compared the actions of the Centre Party to Russia demanding de-escalation from the West over the Russian invasion of Ukraine, stating that it's not the Reform Party's responsibility to ease the situation or meet halfway with their coalition partner on the issue of child benefits. She hinted that the party could attempt to stop the passage of the bill by parliamentary obstruction. Reform Party's parliamentary faction leader Mart Võrklaev confirmed that the party would consider the option should the Centre Party not withdraw the bill from consideration until autumn, when the budget for 2023 would be prepared. Karilaid denied the accusation that the Centre Party was bypassing its coalition partner by moving forward with the bill, stating that "[We] will not pass them by, we want to go together. Don't fall behind". The leader of the Social Democrats, Lauri Läänemets, stated in response to the plans of obstruction that the coalition had de facto stopped existing.

=== Vote on the child benefits bill ===
On 30 May, the Reform Party put forward a motion to withdraw the proposed child benefits bill which failed 32 to 56.

30 May 2022 Vote to withdraw the Family Benefits Act Amendment Act (619 SE)
Vote	Parties	Votes
Yes	Reform Party (32)	32 / 101
No	Centre Party (22), EKRE (19), Isamaa (9) Social Democrats (5), Independent (1)	56 / 101
Absent/did not vote	Reform Party (2), Centre Party (3), Social Democrats (5), Isamaa (3)	13 / 101

Following the vote, Reform Party's parliamentary faction leader Võrklaev stated that as a result of the vote, there was effectively a Reform Party Minority government in Estonia. Karilaid called on the Reform Party to join the rest of the parties to proceed with the child benefits bill and said that the Centre Party has never talked about a government crisis, stating that only the Reform Party has done so. Isamaa leader Helir-Valdor Seeder stated that he was confused about what's happening in the government. On 31 May, Võrklaev expressed hope in the continuation of the government.

On 1 June, the leader of the Social Democrats, Lauri Läänemets, announced that the party would be withdrawing its signatures from the child benefits bill, stating that "We have received confirmation in recent days that under the guise of the child benefits bill, the Centre Party, together with Isamaa and EKRE, is planning to overthrow the current government". Karilaid responded by accusing the Social Democrats of trying to form a coalition with the Reform Party. In response to the claim, Läänemets stated that such a proposal had not been made. Previously, Seeder had also said that no proposals for a coalition had been made to him or his party.

=== Vote on the education reform bill and the expulsion of Centre from government ===
Later that day, the parliament voted on a government-proposed bill which was to make at least 50% of primary education be conducted in Estonian among other things. The motion to withdraw passed 42–34 with the governing Centre Party and opposition EKRE voting to withdraw the bill.

1 June 2022 Vote to withdraw the Early Education and Child Care Act (579 SE)
Vote	Parties	Votes
Yes	Centre Party (22), EKRE (19), Independent (1)	42 / 101
No	Reform Party (28), Isamaa (6)	34 / 101
Absent/did not vote	Reform Party (6), Centre Party (3), Isamaa (6), Social Democrats (10)	25 / 101

MP Jaak Valge of EKRE justified voting to withdraw the bill due to unclear wording while Public Administration minister Jaak Aab expressed concern about the lack of funding allocated to municipal governments for the transition. On his Facebook page, Reform Party MP Jürgen Ligi said "EKREKE (Note: Referring to a coalition between EKRE and the Centre Party (abbreviated KE).) is born. Centre and EKRE voted against government bill calling for transition to only Estonian-language kindergartens. The Socialists did not vote. The Kremlin says thanks".

During the same day, Ratas claimed that Kaja Kallas had declared the coalition dead and in response to accusations of the Centre Party wanting to form a government with EKRE and Isamaa, accused the Reform Party of wanting to form a coalition with the Social Democrats and Isamaa. EKRE's vice chair Henn Põlluaas said that the party prefers a coalition with the Centre Party and Isamaa but did not rule out forming a government with the Reform Party. On 2 June, Ratas called on forming a new coalition but did not rule out continuing a coalition with the Reform Party.

On 3 June, Kallas proposed to president Alar Karis to remove all Centre Party ministers from office. Foreign minister Eva-Maria Liimets was on a visit in Canada during her removal. She said that the decisive factor in the decision was the vote to withdraw the education reform bill.

I had hoped that February 24 and the genocide committed by Russia in Ukraine would open the eyes of all parties in the Riigikogu to how important it is for Estonia's independence to have a unified understanding of the dangers we face as a country neighboring Russia. Unfortunately, the day before yesterday, it became clear that there are two parties in the Riigikogu that, even in the current situation, are unable to pull themselves together and stand up to protect our independence and constitutional values.

As Prime Minister, I promised to dedicate my strength to securing the future of the Estonian people. We do not ensure this future solely by increasing military spending, but primarily through our people's unity and unwavering will to defend our independence. The prerequisite and cornerstone for this is proficiency in the Estonian language. In a situation where the Centre Party is actively working against the most important fundamental values for Estonia in the government, we can no longer continue cooperating with them.

If you add the fact that none of the Centre Party's ministers, except Kristian Jaani and Eva-Maria Liimets, have NATO security clearances, then governing with such a composition of ministers during wartime is impossible. Therefore, I formalized the situation, which has actually been in place for a long time, and submitted proposals for the dismissal of the Centre Party's ministers to Kadriorg. (Note: Referring to the residence of the President of Estonia.)

— Kaja Kallas

As a result, Estonia had its first one-party government after the restoration of independence as the government was only made up of the Reform Party and its ministers.

=== Polling during the crisis ===
Opposition parties were assumed to hold back on a vote of no confidence in Kaja Kallas due to her power as prime minister to ask the president to call snap elections after a successful vote of no confidence. The Reform Party was leading comfortably in most polls at the time and a snap election could've expanded the party's position in parliament whilst weakening the opposition parties' seat count.

Polling firm	Fieldwork Date	Sample size	Ref	Centre	EKRE	Isamaa	SDE	E200	EER	Others	Lead	Gov.	Opp.
Kaja Kallas' second cabinet is formed by Reform, Isamaa and SDE
Norstat	12–18 Jul	1,000	33.9	18.0	16.8	10.7	8.8	8.3	1.7	1.8	15.9	33.9	66.1
Norstat	5–11 Jul	1,000	32.4	16.9	18.5	9.8	8.1	11.5	1.8	1.0	13.9	32.4	67.6
Norstat	27 Jun – 4 Jul	1,000	32.5	17.9	21.1	8.0	7.6	10.5	1.6	0.8	11.4	32.5	67.5
Norstat	14–20 Jun	1,000	34.1	16.0	22.6	7.6	5.8	9.9	2.1	1.9	11.5	34.1	65.9
Turu-uuringute AS	17 Jun (Note: Publication date)	600–700	31	17	18	10	8	12	1	3	13	31	55
Kantar Emor	9–14 Jun	1,537	32	15	18	9	8	15	3	0 (Note: TULE)	14	32	68
Norstat	7–13 Jun	1,000	35.0	16.6	21.3	8.4	6.5	9.1	1.8	0.8	13.7	35.0	65.0
Norstat	1–6 Jun	1,000	33.5	20.5	20.8	6.8	5.8	10.4	2.0	0.2	12.7	33.5	66.5
	2 Jun		The ministers of the Centre Party were dismissed										
Norstat	24–30 May	1,000	34.7	16.7	19.4	6.4	7.0	13.7	0.7	1.4	15.3	52.4	47.6
Norstat	16–23 May	1,000	35.4	17.2	18.5	6.8	6.1	12.3	2.1	1.6	16.9	52.6	47.4
Kantar Emor	12–20 May	1,461	33	16	17	7	7	17	3	0	16	49	51
Turu-uuringute AS	19 May (Note: Publication date)	600–700	32	13	19	6	8	16	2	4	13	45	55

=== Formation of a new coalition ===
The Reform Party proposed starting negotiations with the Social Democrats and Isamaa. On 4 June, the Social Democrats accepted the invitation. The Centre Party invited Isamaa and EKRE to coalition negotiations. EKRE leader Martin Helme accepted the request but demanded to have the position of the prime minister. After long deliberations, Isamaa opted to start coalition negotiations with the Social Democrats and the Reform Party on 11 June. Isamaa abstained on the vote of no confidence in education minister Liina Kersna during the negotiations. Kallas accepted Kersna's resignation on 1 July but did not deliver the resignation to the president due to lacking the votes in the parliament to inaugurate a replacement, instead opting to wait for the coalition negotiations to reach their conclusion.

Kaja Kallas's second cabinet of the Triple Alliance parties of the Isamaa, the Reform Party and the Social Democrats took office on 18 July 2022.

== Aftermath ==
Kaja Kallas' Reform Party went on to win a landslide victory in the 2023 Estonian parliamentary election while the Centre Party lost 10 of its seats and led to the eventual resignation of party leader Jüri Ratas. Karilaid and Ratas joined Isamaa in late 2023 and early 2024 respectively. Jaak Aab joined the Social Democrats in January 2024.

During the 2023 Centre Party leadership election, Mihhail Kõlvart, the eventual successor to Ratas as the leader of the Centre Party, slammed the incoherence of the Centre Party having been in government and opposition at the same time during the crisis. MEP Jaak Madison, after having left the party in 2024, slammed the EKRE leadership for having demanded too much during the lead-up to potential negotiations, and thus losing the opportunity to kick the Reform Party out of power in 2022.

== See also ==
- Kaja Kallas's first cabinet
- Kaja Kallas's second cabinet
