= Nino Strano =

Italian politician (1950–2023)

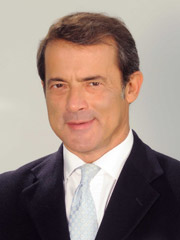
Nino Strano

Nino Strano (29 July 1950 – 11 November 2023) was an Italian politician who served as a Deputy and Senator. Strano died on 11 November 2023, at the age of 73.
