= Alessandro Di Battista =

Italian politician (born 1978)

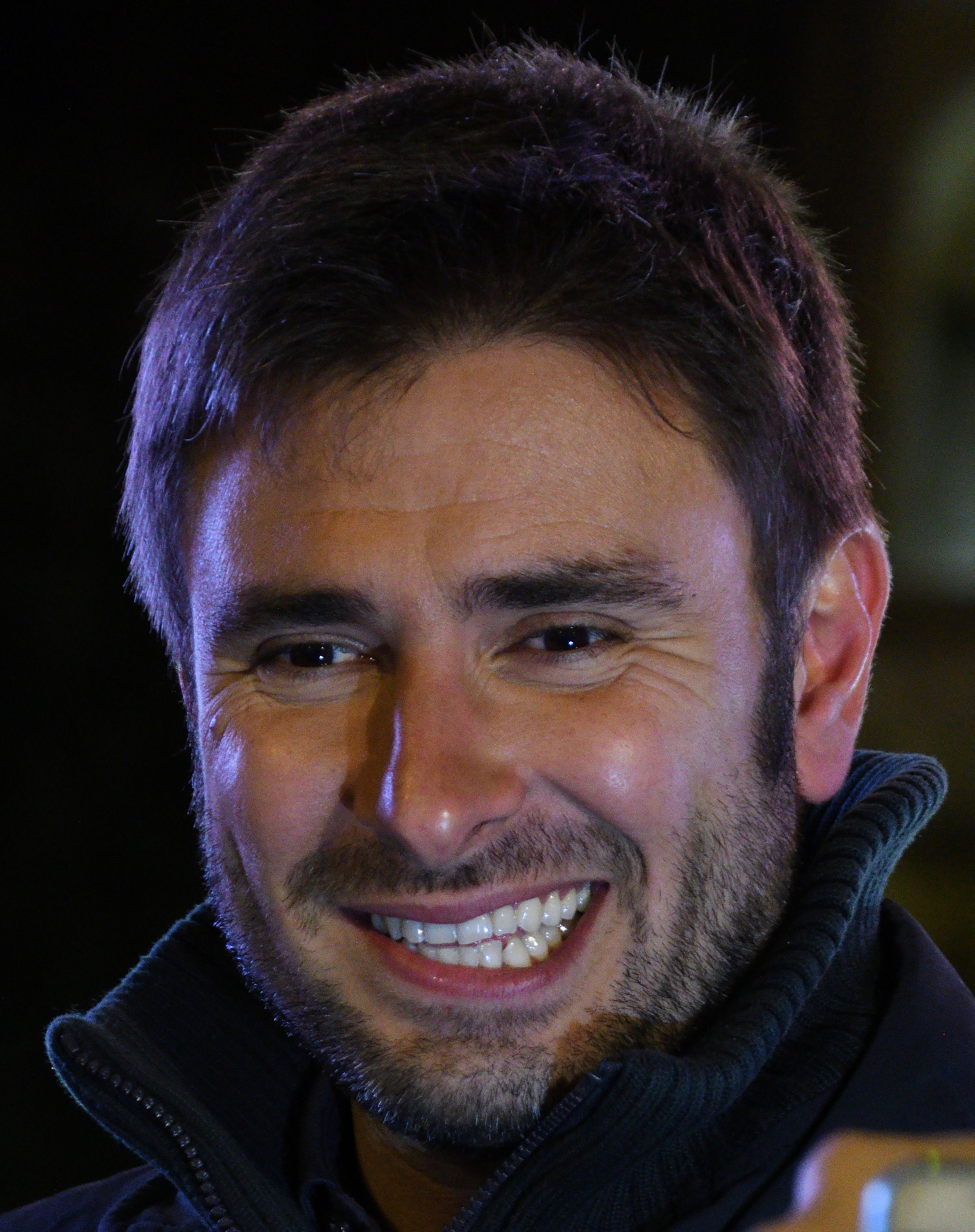

Member of the Chamber of Deputies
- In office 15 March 2013 – 22 March 2018
- Constituency: Lazio 1

Personal details
- Born: 4 August 1978 (age 48) Rome, Italy
- Party: Five Star Movement (2009–2021); Independent (since 2021)
- Education: Roma Tre University
- Profession: Politician, Writer
- Website: aledibattista.it

Alessandro Di Battista (born 4 August 1978) is an Italian politician, activist and writer, deputy of the XVII Legislature of the Italian Republic. He was part of the Five Star Movement from 2009 to 2021. He left the party in February 2021 because he was against the formation of the Draghi government.

== Biography ==
Di Battista was born in Rome to parents of Civita Castellana. His father, Vittorio Di Battista, was an entrepreneur in the healthcare sector and municipal councilor for the Italian Social Movement. Di Battista graduated high school from Liceo Scientifico Statale Farnesina located in Rome. Subsequently, he obtained a laurea in DAMS (drama, art and music) from the University of Roma Tre, followed by a master's degree in International Protection of Human Rights from the Sapienza University of Rome. Later in 2010 he worked for a year as a cooperator in Guatemala, and also collaborated with educational projects in other countries such as Chile.

On 11 February 2021, Di Battista announced his resignation from the 5 Star Movement, as he opposed the group's decision of being part of the new government formed by Mario Draghi, during the 2021 Italian government crisis.

== Political activity ==
In 2008, Di Battista was a candidate with the list of Friends of Beppe Grillo to the municipal authorities of Rome. Later on he joined the 5 Star Movement and became a spokesman for Lazio. Later in December 2012 he became a candidate for the parliamentarians of the 5 Star Movement, but did not win. The following year in 2013, he won the race for deputy of the 5 Star Movement. From 7 May 2013 to July 2015 he was vice president of the commission for Foreign and Community Affairs.

On 7 August 2016, with the coast to coast Constitution, he went on a motorcycle tour to promote the "No" to the referendum on the Renzi-Boschi constitutional reform. On 20 November 2017 he announced that he will not stand for re-election to the next parliamentary elections of 2018, but will remain in the 5 Star Movement. Battista accused Silvio Berlusconi of having ties with the Italian Mafia, leading to a corrupt system while he was in power, stating he has only made it more powerful. He expressed approval for Donald Trump's foreign policy, stating that he did better than the "coup organizer" Obama.

Nicknamed "the Five Star Che Guevara", he was one of the leaders of the most radical wing of the movement. He is considered an anti-capitalist and anti-imperialist, even if he considers outdated the ideological categories of the twentieth century. He cites inspirational figures such as Antonio Gramsci, Pier Paolo Pasolini and Eduardo Galeano. In 2020 he accused John Elkann and Fiat of owning 15 newspapers and having privileges like a Royal family.

After the 5 Star Movement decided to support and be part of the Draghi government, Di Battista announced in a video that he would abandon the movement. He also declared that the Draghi Cabinet had been a work of Gianni Letta and he will not found another political party nor lead the set of deputies expelled out of 5 Star Movement. In May 2021 he opened his blog without a political party.

In 2023 he founded the association "Schierarsi" (Italian: To take side).

== Journalist and writing activity ==
Di Battista has written a number of books, mostly about politics and his travel experiences in South America. After his parliamentary activity, he started collaborating with Il Fatto Quotidiano, providing documentaries and journalistic coverage on foreign world areas, as well as podcasts and interviews.

== Controversies ==
On 14 February 2015, in an article published by The New York Times Di Battista is ranked as winner for the "biggest lie" of the year, pronounced by a politician in 2014. In the article, it is reported a sentence told by Di Battista in a rally in which, describing the political situation in Nigeria, he said that "60% of the country is in the hands of Boko Haram, and the rest of the country is suffering with Ebola", thesis rejected both by the NYT and the World Health Organization.

Di Battista declared that "for the world peace, thankfully we have Putin". On 22 February 2022, Di Battista declared "Russia is not invading Ukraine" and "that Putin wants everything but a war".
