= 2022 Italian government crisis =

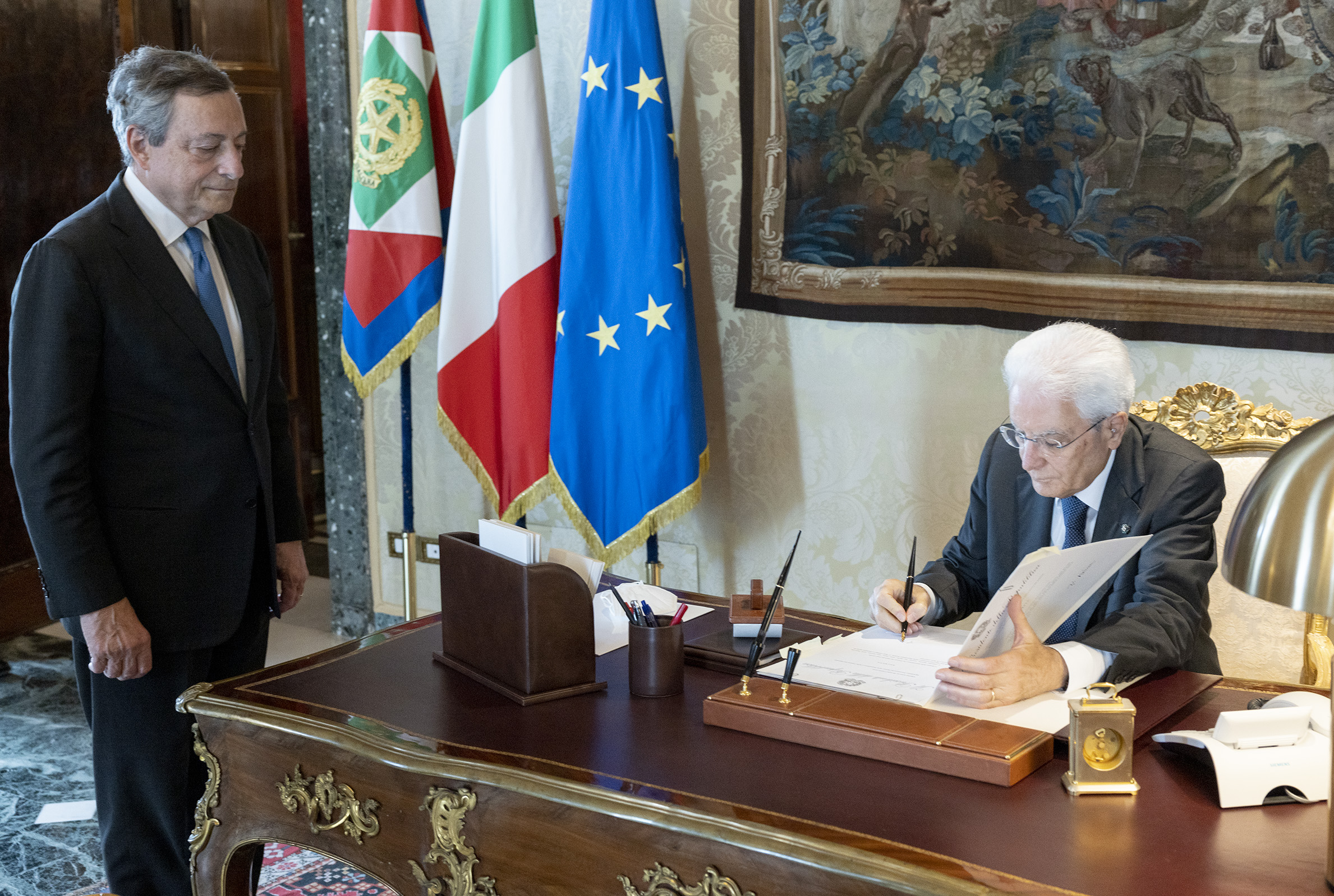
- Sergio Mattarella dissolving Parliament following Mario Draghi's resignation
- Date: 14 July 2022 – 21 July 2022
- Location: Italy
- Type: Parliamentary crisis
- Cause: Withdrawal of M5S's support to Mario Draghi's government
- Participants: M5S, Lega, PD, FI, IpF, FdI, IV, LeU, Aut, Mixed Group
- Outcome: M5S, Lega, and FI's withdrawal of their support to the government; Resignation of Prime Minister Mario Draghi; Dissolution of Parliament and snap election called

The 2022 Italian government crisis was a political event in Italy that began on 14 July. It includes the events that followed the announcement of Giuseppe Conte, leader of the Five Star Movement (M5S) and former Prime Minister of Italy, that the M5S would withdraw its support to the national unity government of Mario Draghi over a bill regarding an economic stimulus to combat the ongoing energy and economic crisis. The government fell a week later when the M5S, Lega, and Forza Italia deliberately refused to take part in a vote of confidence in the Government.

On 14 July, despite having largely won the confidence vote, Prime Minister Draghi offered his resignation, which was rejected by President Sergio Mattarella. On 21 July, Draghi resigned again after a new confidence vote in the Senate failed to pass with an absolute majority, following the defections of M5S, Lega, and Forza Italia; President Mattarella accepted Draghi's resignation and called a snap election for 25 September 2022.

== Background ==
The 2018 general election produced a hung parliament. From June 2018 until January 2021, the then-independent politician Giuseppe Conte served as prime minister in two different cabinets, one supported by a right-wing coalition (Conte I Cabinet) and another supported by a centre-left coalition (Conte II Cabinet). In January 2021, Matteo Renzi, leader of Italia Viva (IV), withdrew the support to Conte's cabinet, causing the fall of the government. After consultations, President Sergio Mattarella appointed Mario Draghi, a banker and former president of the European Central Bank, to lead a national unity government composed by M5S, League, Democratic Party (PD), Forza Italia (FI), IV, and Article One (Art.1).

During 2022, rumours arose around a possible withdrawal of M5S's support to the national unity government, and allegations were spread that Draghi had privately criticised Conte and asked M5S founder Beppe Grillo to replace him. Conte often criticised the Government's economic policies, especially its attempts to alter the citizens' income (a guaranteed minimum income for Italian citizens living below the poverty line) and the superbonus 110% scheme (a building tax credit of up to 110%), which were both introduced by Conte's governments. Moreover, tensions regarding military aid to Ukraine following the Russian invasion of Ukraine, had caused a split within the M5S, with foreign minister Luigi Di Maio leaving the movement in June 2022 and his own political party, Together for the Future (IpF), in opposition to Conte's criticism of weapons deliveries to Ukraine. On 12 July, Draghi stated he would resign if the M5S withdrew its support to the government.

== Political crisis ==
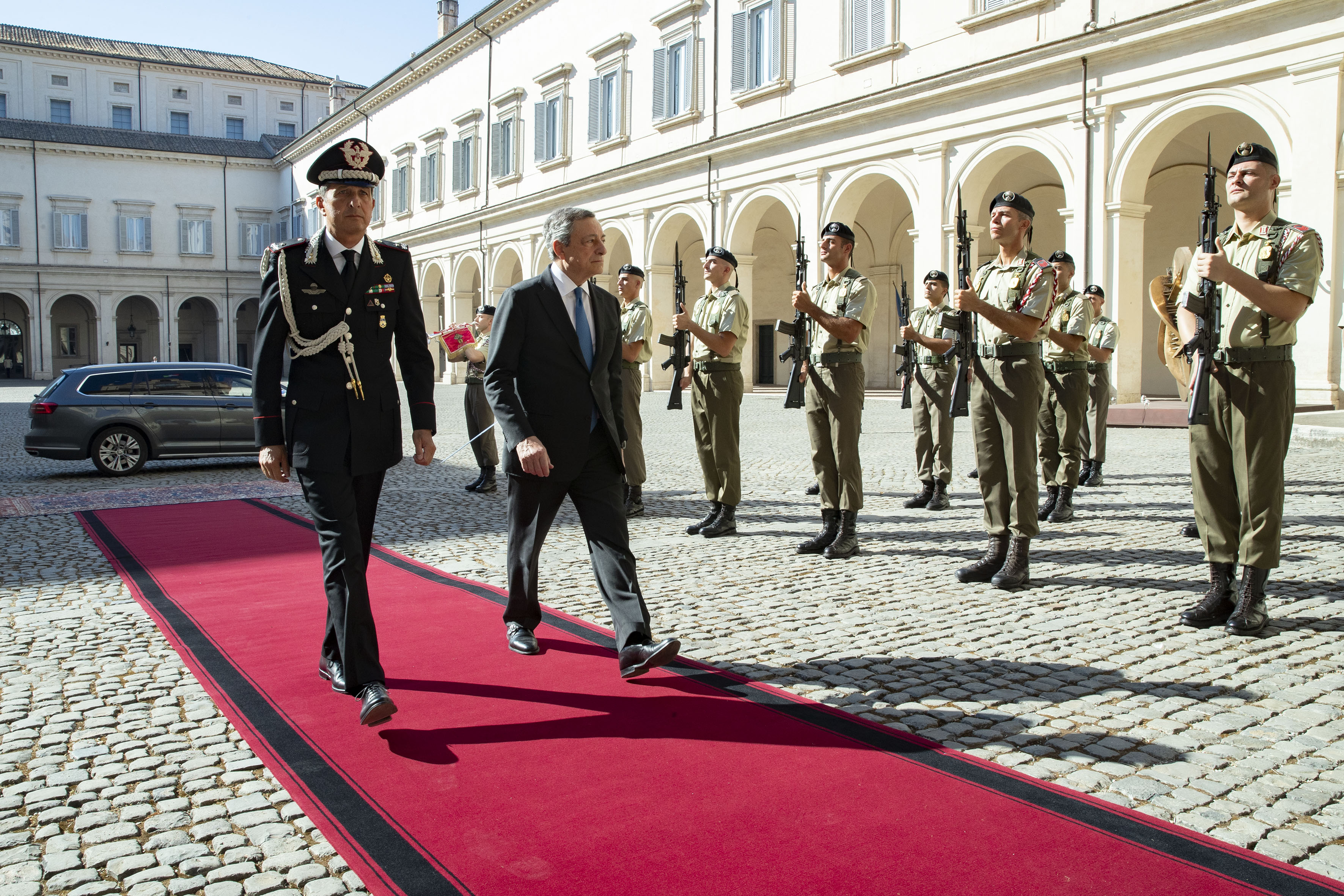
Prime Minister Mario Draghi arriving at the Quirinal Palace to resign

During a press conference on 13 July 2022, Conte announced that the M5S would abstain during the vote on converting into law the decreto aiuti (English: Decree on Economic Aid, or, more simply, Aid Decree), which the Government had declared to be a confidence vote. The Decree introduced a €23 billion stimulus to fight the economic and energy crisis caused by the COVID-19 pandemic and the ongoing Russo-Ukrainian war, which Conte deemed "not enough to tackle the cost of living crisis". The Decree also included a provision authorizing the construction of a waste-to-energy plant in Rome, which Conte and the M5S opposed, deeming it dangerous for the environment.

On 14 July, the decree was approved by the Senate of the Republic with 172 votes in favor, far above the majority threshold; the M5S left the Senate floor during the voting process. Despite not officially withdrawing the support to the government, this move was widely considered as a clear opposition to the government's policies, and de facto opened a political crisis within the Draghi Cabinet.

14 July 2022 Confidence vote on converting into law the Aid Decree
House of Parliament	Vote	Parties	Votes
Senate of the Republic (Voting: 211 of 321, Majority: 106)	Yes	Lega–PSd'Az (55), FI–UdC (43), PD (32), Mixed Group–Ind. (16), IV–PSI (12), IpF (10), Aut (4)	172 / 211
Senate of the Republic (Voting: 211 of 321, Majority: 106)	No	FdI (21), UpC (11), Mixed Group–Ind. (7)	39 / 211
Senate of the Republic (Voting: 211 of 321, Majority: 106)	Absentees (Note: Does not include Members who were granted a leave of absence by the Senate.)	M5S (46), Mixed Group–Ind. (14), UpC (2), Lega–PSd'Az (2)	64 / 321

Following the M5S's abstention, Draghi consulted with President Mattarella about the crisis. After a few hours, Draghi resigned as prime minister; he claimed that, without the support of the M5S (who had received a plurality of votes in the previous general election), the democratic legitimacy of his Government was in jeopardy. Draghi's resignation was promptly rejected by President Mattarella. In an official statement released by the presidential office, Mattarella called on Draghi to seek a debate and a vote in the Italian Parliament to better understand the positions of the several political parties before finalizing any decision. On 14 July, Lega claimed it supported the immediate calling of a snap election, while the PD pledged to do whatever it could to prevent a government collapse. On 16 July, 11 mayors wrote an open letter to Draghi asking him to revoke his resignation and remain as prime minister; by 19 July, almost two thousand mayors had attached their signature.

=== Vote of confidence in Draghi's government ===
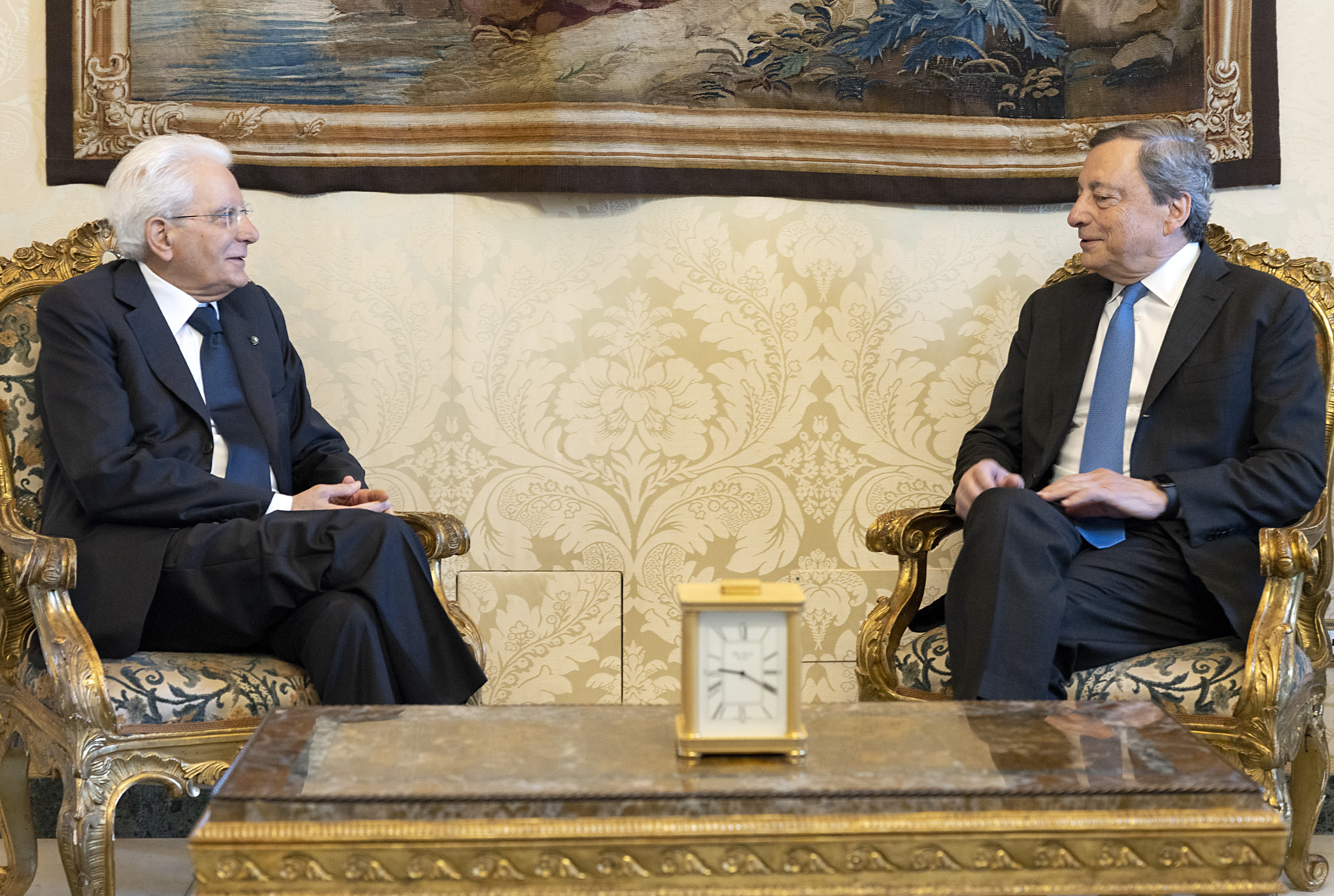
Draghi announcing his resignation to President Mattarella

On 20 July, Draghi addressed the Senate, reiterating his support for the European Union, NATO, and Ukraine, and saying it was fully necessary to bring to term the economic and justice reforms his government started. He also stated he was fully committed to investing more in renewable energy and green-friendly projects, and that he intended to keep the citizens' income, albeit with some changes.

Thereafter, two motions for a resolution were made: one by centrist Senator Pierferdinando Casini, which stated that the Senate supported the Government as presently constituted, and one by senior Lega politician Roberto Calderoli, which called for the creation of a new Government still led by Draghi, but which would not include any member of the M5S.

Draghi, who believed his Government could not be effective unless it enjoyed large parliamentary support from all sides, declared that he did not intend to govern without M5S' backing, and that he would treat the vote on Casini's motion as a matter of confidence.

During the debate on Casini's proposal, Lega and FI announced that they would leave the floor during the vote, claiming that following M5S' refusal to take part in the confidence vote the previous Thursday the majority was too divided for the cabinet to be efficient going forwards.

M5S also announced its decision to abstain, asserting Draghi had not sufficiently addressed their concerns with the executive's policies. Casini's motion ultimately passed with 95 votes in favor and 38 against, but fell well short of the 161 votes needed for an absolute majority. Calderoli's motion was not put up to a vote.

In the aftermath of the vote, Minister for Regional Affairs Mariastella Gelmini and Minister of Public Administration Renato Brunetta left FI.

20 July 2022 Vote of confidence in the Draghi Cabinet
House of Parliament	Vote	Parties	Votes
Senate of the Republic (Voting: 133 of 321, Majority: 67)	Yes	PD (37), IV–PSI (15), IpF (10), IaC (9), Aut (7), LeU (6), +EU–Action (4), Mixed Group–Ind. (3), FI (2), CI–MAIE (2)	95 / 133
Senate of the Republic (Voting: 133 of 321, Majority: 67)	No	FdI (20), UpC (10), Italexit (4), Mixed Group–Ind. (3), ManifestA (1)	38 / 133
Senate of the Republic (Voting: 133 of 321, Majority: 67)	Present, not voting (Note: Senators in this category did not cast a vote either for or against the motion, but nonetheless recorded themselves as present and were counted as such for the purpose of determining if there was a sufficient quorum.)	M5S (57), Lega (1)	58 / 321
Senate of the Republic (Voting: 133 of 321, Majority: 67)	Absentees (Note: Does not include Members who were granted a leave of absence by the Senate.)	Lega–PSd'Az (55), FI–UdC (40), Mixed Group–Ind. (5), UpC (2), FdI (1), ManifestA (1)	104 / 321

In the morning of 21 July, Draghi offered again his resignation to President Mattarella, who had no choice but to accept it, since by then it had become clear the government lacked parliamentary support. As per constitutional convention, Draghi was to continue to serve as Prime Minister in an acting capacity until a new government could be formed. In the evening, Mattarella officially dissolved Parliament and called a snap election, scheduling it for 25 September 2022.

== See also ==
- 2018 Italian government formation
- 2021–present global energy crisis
- 2022 Italian general election
- COVID-19 pandemic in Italy
- COVID-19 recession
- Economic impact of the COVID-19 pandemic
- Opinion polling for the 2022 Italian general election
