= For the Autonomies =

Italian parliamentary group

For the Autonomies Per le Autonomie
- Legislature(s): Senate
- Foundation: 30 May 2001
- Leader: Julia Unterberger
- Representation: 7 / 205
- Ideology: Regionalism (Note: SVP (2001–), UV (2001–2006, 2008–2022), Daisy Civic List/UpT/CB (2001–2008, 2013–), RV (2006–2008), VN (2011–2013), ScN (2022–2023)); Christian democracy (Note: SVP (2001–), Daisy Civic List/UpT/CB (2001–2008, 2013–), PPI (2001–2002), DE (2001–2002), UdC (2008–2013), DemoS (2014–2018), CpE (2018–2022)); Social democracy (Note: DS (2006–2007), RV (2006–2008), PD (2007–2008, 2013–), PSI (2011–2018)); Green politics (Note: VVV (2025–), EV (2025–present))
- Political position: Centre to centre-left

For the Autonomies (Italian: Per le Autonomie, Aut) is a heterogeneous, mostly centrist, centre-left and regionalist, parliamentary group which has been active, with slightly different names and compositions, in the Italian Senate since 2001.

== History ==
The group was formed in May 2001 by six senators representing the northern special-statute autonomous regions of Trentino-Alto Adige/Südtirol (composed of two autonomous provinces, Trentino and South Tyrol) and Aosta Valley, two senators of European Democracy (DE) and senators for life Giulio Andreotti (a long-time Christian Democrat, who was then a member of DE too) and Gianni Agnelli. Instrumental in the formation of the group were Helga Thaler Ausserhofer, who served also as its first president, and Andreotti: the two formed a friendship and a strong political bond, despite their different geographical and political backgrounds.

The group has since been home for the regionalist parties usually affiliated with the centre-left Olive Tree (Ulivo) coalition and, later, the Democratic Party (PD), including the South Tyrolean People's Party (SVP), the Trentino Tyrolean Autonomist Party (PATT), the Union for Trentino (UpT), the Valdostan Union (UV) and Valdostan Renewal (RV), and most senators for life, including Andreotti (2001–2006, 2008–2013), Agnelli (2001–2003), Francesco Cossiga (2003–2006, 2008–2010), Emilio Colombo (2008–2013), Carlo Rubbia (2013–2018), Elena Cattaneo (2013–present), Giorgio Napolitano (2015–2023), Carlo Azeglio Ciampi (2015–2016), Renzo Piano (2015–2018) and Carlo Rubbia (2022–present).

In 2006–2008 the group survived thanks to the influx of six senators of the would-be PD. In 2008–2013 it welcomed the Union of the Centre (UdC), the Associative Movement Italians Abroad (MAIE) and some centre-right independent or minor-party senators; during that parliamentary term the group saw also the return of Andreotti and Cossiga. In 2013–2018 the group welcomed the senators of the Italian Socialist Party (PSI) and, from 2014 to 2018, those of Solidary Democracy (DeS). More recently, from 2018 to 2022, the group featured also Pier Ferdinando Casini (Centrists for Europe–CP), who has continuously served in Parliament since 1983. In 2025 the group was joined by one senator representing the Greens of South Tyrol and Green Europe.

== Composition ==
=== 2022–present ===
Party	Main ideology	MPs	
Party	Main ideology	2022	now
South Tyrolean People's Party	Regionalism	2	2
Campobase	Regionalism	1	1
Democratic Party (Note: Luigi Spagnolli, elected in the constituency of Bolzano.)	Social democracy	1	1
Greens of South Tyrol / Green Europe	Green politics	–	1
South calls North	Regionalism	1	–
Non-party independents		2	2
Total		7	7

Source: Senate of the Republic

=== 2018–2022 ===
Party	Main ideology	MPs	
Party	Main ideology	2018	2022
South Tyrolean People's Party	Regionalism	3	3
Valdostan Union	Regionalism	1	1
Democratic Party (Note: Gianclaudio Bressa, elected with the support of the South Tyrolean People's Party in the constituency of Bolzano.)	Social democracy	1	1
Centrists for Europe–CP	Centrism	1	1
Non-party independents		2	2
Total		8	8

Source: Senate of the Republic

=== 2013–2018 ===
Party	Main ideology	MPs	
Party	Main ideology	2013	2018
Italian Socialist Party	Social democracy	2	3
South Tyrolean People's Party	Regionalism	2	2
Trentino Tyrolean Autonomist Party	Regionalism	1	1
Union for Trentino	Regionalism	1	1
Valdostan Union	Regionalism	1	1
Democratic Party (Note: Francesco Palermo, elected with the support of the South Tyrolean People's Party in the constituency of Bolzano.)	Social democracy	1	1
Non-party independents		2	5
Solidary Democracy	Christian left	–	1
Associative Movement Italians Abroad	Centrism	–	1
Total		10	16

Source: Senate of the Republic

=== 2008–2013 ===
Party	Main ideology	MPs	
Party	Main ideology	2008	2013
South Tyrolean People's Party	Regionalism	3	3
Union of the Centre	Christian democracy	3	5
Valdostan Union	Regionalism	1	1
Associative Movement Italians Abroad	Centrism	1	1
Non-party independents		3	2
Toward North	Regionalism	–	1
Italian Socialist Party	Social democracy	–	1
Italian Republican Party	Social liberalism	–	1
Italian Liberal Party	Liberalism	–	1
Total		11	16

Source: Senate of the Republic

=== 2006–2008 ===
Party	Main ideology	MPs	
Party	Main ideology	2006	2008
South Tyrolean People's Party	Regionalism	3	3
Democrats of the Left	Social democracy	3	0
Democracy is Freedom – The Daisy	Centrism	2	0
Daisy Civic List	Regionalism	1	1
Valdostan Renewal	Regionalism	1	1
Democratic Party	Social democracy	–	5
Total		10	10

Source: Senate of the Republic

=== 2001–2006 ===
Party	Main ideology	MPs	
Party	Main ideology	2001	2006
South Tyrolean People's Party	Regionalism	3	3
European Democracy	Christian democracy	3	0
Daisy Civic List	Regionalism	1	1
Valdostan Union	Regionalism	1	1
Italian People's Party	Christian democracy	1	0
Non-party independents		1	4
Democracy is Freedom – The Daisy	Centrism	–	1
Total		10	10

Source: Senate of the Republic

== Leadership ==
- President:
  - Helga Thaler Ausserhofer (SVP, 2001–2006)
  - Oskar Peterlini (SVP, 2006–2008)
  - Gianpiero D'Alia (UdC, 2008–2013)
  - Karl Zeller (SVP, 2013–2018)
  - Julia Unterberger (SVP, 2018–present)
