= List of members of the European Parliament for Italy, 2019–2024 =

Members of the European Parliament for Italy
ECSC delegation	(1952)
EP delegation	(1958)
1st term	(1979)
2nd term	(1984)
3rd term	(1989)
4th term	(1994)
5th term	(1999)
6th term	(2004)
7th term	(2009)
8th term	(2014)
9th term	(2019)
10th term	(2024)

This is a list of the 73 members of the European Parliament for Italy in the Ninth European Parliament.

After Brexit, Italy gained three extra seats that were distributed from the British delegation of MEPs.

Following the 2022 general election in Italy, nine MEPs were elected to the Italian Parliament and were replaced on their party lists by; Denis Nesci, Matteo Gazzini, Elisabetta De Blasis, Paola Ghidoni, Maria Angela Danzì, Beatrice Covassi, Alessandra Mussolini, Lara Comi and Achille Variati.

== List ==
On the League list: (ID)

1. Matteo Adinolfi
2. Simona Baldassarre – until 2 April 2023; Maria Veronica Rossi – since 6 April 2023
3. Alessandra Basso
4. Mara Bizzotto – until 12 October 2022; Matteo Gazzini – since 2 November 2022 (joined Forza Italia and Non-Inscrits on 9 December 2023)
5. Cinzia Bonfrisco
6. Paolo Borchia
7. Marco Campomenosi
8. Andrea Caroppo – until 3 October 2022; left the party on 6 October 2020, until 28 April 2021 non-inscrits, since then EPP Group; Elisabetta De Blasis – since 2 November 2022 (left the party and group on 11 September 2023, joined ECR Group on 9 November)
9. Massimo Casanova
10. Susanna Ceccardi
11. Angelo Ciocca
12. Rosanna Conte
13. Gianantonio Da Re
14. Francesca Donato (left the party on 20 September 2021, since 6 October Non-Inscrits, joined Christian Democracy Sicily on 24 January 2023)
15. Marco Dreosto – until 3 October 2022; Paola Ghidoni – since 2 November 2022
16. Gianna Gancia
17. Valentino Grant
18. Danilo Lancini
19. Elena Lizzi
20. Alessandro Panza
21. Luisa Regimenti (joined Forza Italia in 2021; left the European Parliament in 2023); Francesca Peppucci – since 6 April 2023 (from 6–19 April non-inscrits, since 20 April Forza Italia and EPP Group)
22. Antonio Maria Rinaldi
23. Silvia Sardone
24. Annalisa Tardino
25. Isabella Tovaglieri
26. Lucia Vuolo (from 4 June to 10 October 2021 non-inscrits, since then Forza Italia and EPP Group)
27. Stefania Zambelli
28. Marco Zanni
29. Vincenzo Sofo – since Brexit, 1 February 2020 (joined Brothers of Italy and ECR Group on 18 February 2021)

On the Democratic Party list: (S&D)

1. Pietro Bartolo
2. Brando Benifei
3. Simona Bonafé – until 12 October 2022; Beatrice Covassi – since 2 November 2022
4. Carlo Calenda – until 12 October 2022 (from 28 August 2019 Action party and after 10 November 2021 Renew Europe); Achille Variati − since 2 November 2022
5. Caterina Chinnici
6. Paolo De Castro
7. Andrea Cozzolino
8. Giuseppe Ferrandino (left the party and joined Action - Italia Viva/Renew Europe on 9 November 2022, since 14 April 2023 Action)
9. Elisabetta Gualmini
10. Roberto Gualtieri – until 5 September 2019; Nicola Danti – from 5 September 2019 (since 21 October 2019 Italia Viva and since 12 February 2020 Renew Europe)
11. Pierfrancesco Majorino
12. Alessandra Moretti
13. Pina Picierno
14. Giuliano Pisapia
15. Franco Roberti
16. David Sassoli – died on 11 January 2022; Camilla Laureti – from 11 January 2022
17. Massimiliano Smeriglio
18. Irene Tinagli
19. Patrizia Toia

On the Five Star Movement list: (Non-Inscrits)

1. Isabella Adinolfi
2. Tiziana Beghin
3. Fabio Massimo Castaldo (left the party, joined Action and Renew Europe on 8 February 2024)
4. Ignazio Corrao (left the party, since 9 December 2020 Greens–EFA)
5. Rosa D'Amato (left the party, since 9 December 2020 Greens–EFA)
6. Eleonora Evi – until 12 October 2022 (left the party, from 9 December 2020 Greens–EFA); Maria Angela Danzì – since 2 November 2022
7. Laura Ferrara
8. Mario Furore
9. Chiara Maria Gemma (was member of Together for the Future from 22 June to 31 July 2022, since 15 February 2023 ECR Group and joined Brothers of Italy on 29 May)
10. Dino Giarrusso (left the party on 26 May 2022, was member of South Calls North from 27 June to 2 August 2022)
11. Piernicola Pedicini (left the party, since 9 December 2020 Greens–EFA, joined August 24th Movement on 15 May 2021)
12. Sabrina Pignedoli
13. Daniela Rondinelli (was member of Together for the Future from 22 June to 31 July 2022, joined Democratic Party and S&D on 25 January 2023)
14. Marco Zullo (left the party, since 10 March 2020 Renew Europe)

On the Forza Italia list: (EPP Group)

1. Silvio Berlusconi – until 12 October 2022; Alessandra Mussolini – since 2 November 2022
2. Fulvio Martusciello
3. Giuseppe Milazzo (joined Brothers of Italy and ECR on 23 June 2021)
4. Aldo Patriciello
5. Massimiliano Salini
6. Antonio Tajani – until 12 October 2022; Lara Comi – since 2 November 2022
7. Salvatore De Meo – since Brexit, 1 February 2020

On the Brothers of Italy list: (ECR)

1. Carlo Fidanza
2. Pietro Fiocchi
3. Raffaele Fitto – until 12 October 2022; Denis Nesci – since 2 November 2022
4. Nicola Procaccini
5. Raffaele Stancanelli
6. Sergio Berlato – since Brexit, 1 February 2020

On the South Tyrolean People's Party list: (EPP Group)

1. Herbert Dorfmann

== See also ==
- Member of the European Parliament
