= European Parliament Committee on Economic and Monetary Affairs =

European Parliament committee

Committee on Economic and Monetary Affairs
- Abbreviation: ECON
- Type: Standing committee
- Legislature: European Parliament
- Parliamentary term: 10th European Parliament
- Chair: Aurore Lalucq; S&D, France
- Vice-Chairs: Damian Boeselager (Greens/EFA); Ľudovít Ódor (Renew); Luděk Niedermayer (EPP); Marlena Maląg (ECR)
- Members: 60
- Political composition: EPP: 16 · S&D: 11 · ECR: 7 · Renew: 6 PfE: 7 · Greens/EFA: 4 · The Left: 4 · ESN: 2 · NI: 3
- Jurisdiction: Economic and monetary policy, financial services, capital and payments, taxation, competition and the international financial system
- Counterpart: Economic and Financial Affairs Council
- Website: Official website

The Committee on Economic and Monetary Affairs (ECON) is a standing committee of the European Parliament. It is responsible for economic and monetary policy, the functioning of Economic and Monetary Union, financial services and markets, the free movement of capital and payments, taxation, competition policy and the international monetary and financial system.

== Responsibilities ==
The committee is responsible for the economic and monetary policies of the European Union and the functioning of Economic and Monetary Union. It also deals with the European monetary and financial system and relations with relevant institutions and international organisations.

Its remit includes:

- economic governance and coordination of the economic policies of the member states;
- monetary policy and parliamentary scrutiny of the European Central Bank;
- the free movement of capital and payments, including cross-border payments and the Single Euro Payments Area;
- the international monetary and financial system;
- competition rules and state aid;
- tax provisions;
- the regulation and supervision of financial services, institutions and markets;
- financial reporting, auditing, accounting rules and corporate governance where these concern financial services; and
- relevant financial activities of the European Investment Bank as part of economic governance in the euro area.

The committee conducts regular monetary dialogues with the President of the European Central Bank and scrutinises commissioners, finance ministers and the heads of relevant EU agencies. In taxation matters, it is assisted by the Subcommittee on Tax Matters.

== Chairs ==
The following table lists the chairs of the committee since 2004.

Name	Political group	Member state	Took office	Left office
Pervenche Berès	PES	France	2004	2009
Sharon Bowles	ALDE	United Kingdom	2009	2014
Roberto Gualtieri	S&D	Italy	2014	2019
Irene Tinagli	S&D	Italy	2019	2024
Aurore Lalucq	S&D	France	2024	Incumbent

== Members ==
=== 10th Parliament, 2024–2029 ===
The committee consists of 60 full members. Its current composition is shown below, with the chair and vice-chairs indicated in italics.

European People's Party	Progressive Alliance of Socialists and Democrats	European Conservatives and Reformists	Renew Europe
Luděk Niedermayer, Czechia, Vice-Chair; Georgios Aftias, Greece; Isabel Benjumea, Spain; Stefan Berger, Germany; Marco Falcone, Italy; Markus Ferber, Germany; Dirk Gotink, Netherlands; Michalis Hatzipantelas, Cyprus; Kinga Kollár, Hungary; Fulvio Martusciello, Italy; Siegfried Mureșan, Romania; Fernando Navarrete Rojas, Spain; Lídia Pereira, Portugal; Sirpa Pietikäinen, Finland; Paulius Saudargas, Lithuania; Ralf Seekatz, Germany	Aurore Lalucq, France, Chair; Francisco Assis, Portugal; Jonás Fernández, Spain; Claire Fita, France; Eero Heinäluoma, Finland; Costas Mavrides, Cyprus; Nikos Papandreou, Greece; Evelyn Regner, Austria; René Repasi, Germany; Irene Tinagli, Italy; Lara Wolters, Netherlands	Marlena Maląg, Poland, Vice-Chair; Stephen Nikola Bartulica, Croatia; Giovanni Crosetto, Italy; Denis Nesci, Italy; Guillaume Peltier, France; Johan Van Overtveldt, Belgium; Roberts Zīle, Latvia	Ľudovít Ódor, Slovakia, Vice-Chair; Gilles Boyer, France; Engin Eroglu, Germany; Billy Kelleher, Ireland; Anouk van Brug, Netherlands; Stéphanie Yon-Courtin, France
Patriots for Europe	Greens–European Free Alliance	The Left	Europe of Sovereign Nations
Mireia Borrás Pabón, Spain; Enikő Győri, Hungary; Jaroslav Knot, Czechia; Tomáš Kubín, Czechia; Pierre Pimpie, France; Jaroslava Pokorná Jermanová, Czechia; Auke Zijlstra, Netherlands	Damian Boeselager, Germany, Vice-Chair; Rasmus Andresen, Germany; Ufuk Kâhya, Netherlands; Marie Toussaint, France	Gaetano Pedullà, Italy; Jussi Saramo, Finland; Martin Schirdewan, Germany; Pasquale Tridico, Italy	Siegbert Droese, Germany; Rada Laykova, Bulgaria
Non-Inscrits			
Sibylle Berg, Germany; Fabio De Masi, Germany; Friedrich Pürner, Germany			

==== Substitute members ====
Substitute members of the 10th Parliament (click “show” to expand)

The committee's substitute members are listed below.

European People's Party	Progressive Alliance of Socialists and Democrats	European Conservatives and Reformists	Renew Europe
David Casa, Malta; Regina Doherty, Ireland; Herbert Dorfmann, Italy; Michael Gahler, Germany; Christophe Gomart, France; Hanna Gronkiewicz-Waltz, Poland; Martine Kemp, Luxembourg; Arba Kokalari, Sweden; Janusz Lewandowski, Poland; Antonio López-Istúriz White, Spain; Eva Maydell, Bulgaria; Danuše Nerudová, Czechia; Andreas Schwab, Germany; Angelika Winzig, Austria	Thomas Bajada, Malta; Dragoș Benea, Romania; Adnan Dibrani, Sweden; Matthias Ecke, Germany; Niels Fuglsang, Denmark; Bruno Gonçalves, Portugal; Camilla Laureti, Italy; César Luena, Spain; Tsvetelina Penkova, Bulgaria; Carla Tavares, Portugal	Bogdan Rzońca, Poland; Marco Squarta, Italy; Francesco Ventola, Italy; Mariateresa Vivaldini, Italy; Veronika Vrecionová, Czechia	Pascal Canfin, France; Gerben-Jan Gerbrandy, Netherlands; Ivars Ijabs, Latvia; Katri Kulmuni, Finland; Morten Løkkegaard, Denmark; Vlad Voiculescu, Romania
Patriots for Europe	Greens–European Free Alliance	The Left	Europe of Sovereign Nations
Paolo Borchia, Italy; Csaba Dömötör, Hungary; Roman Haider, Austria; Gerald Hauser, Austria	Maria Ohisalo, Finland; Kira Marie Peter-Hansen, Denmark; Vladimir Prebilič, Slovenia; Virginijus Sinkevičius, Lithuania	Manon Aubry, France; Marc Botenga, Belgium; Martin Günther, Germany; Catarina Martins, Portugal	Alexander Jungbluth, Germany; Volker Schnurrbusch, Germany
Non-Inscrits			
Fernand Kartheiser, Luxembourg; Lefteris Nikolaou-Alavanos, Greece; Jan-Peter Warnke, Germany			

== Monetary dialogue ==
Since the establishment of Economic and Monetary Union, one of the committee's principal scrutiny functions has been its regular monetary dialogue with the European Central Bank. The President of the ECB normally appears before the committee four times a year to explain monetary-policy decisions and answer questions from members. The committee also considers appointments to the ECB's Executive Board and other senior posts in the European system of financial supervision.

== Research support ==
The committee's work is supported by the research services of the European Parliament. These services provide studies, briefings and other analyses concerning economic governance, monetary policy, financial regulation, banking, capital markets, taxation and competition.

Publications prepared for the committee are made available through its online database of supporting analyses and through the European Parliament's Think Tank.

== See also ==
- Economic and Monetary Union of the European Union
- European Central Bank
- European System of Financial Supervision
- Capital Markets Union
- Banking union
- Economic and Financial Affairs Council
- European Parliament Subcommittee on Tax Matters
