= Beatrice Covassi =

Italian politician (born 1968)

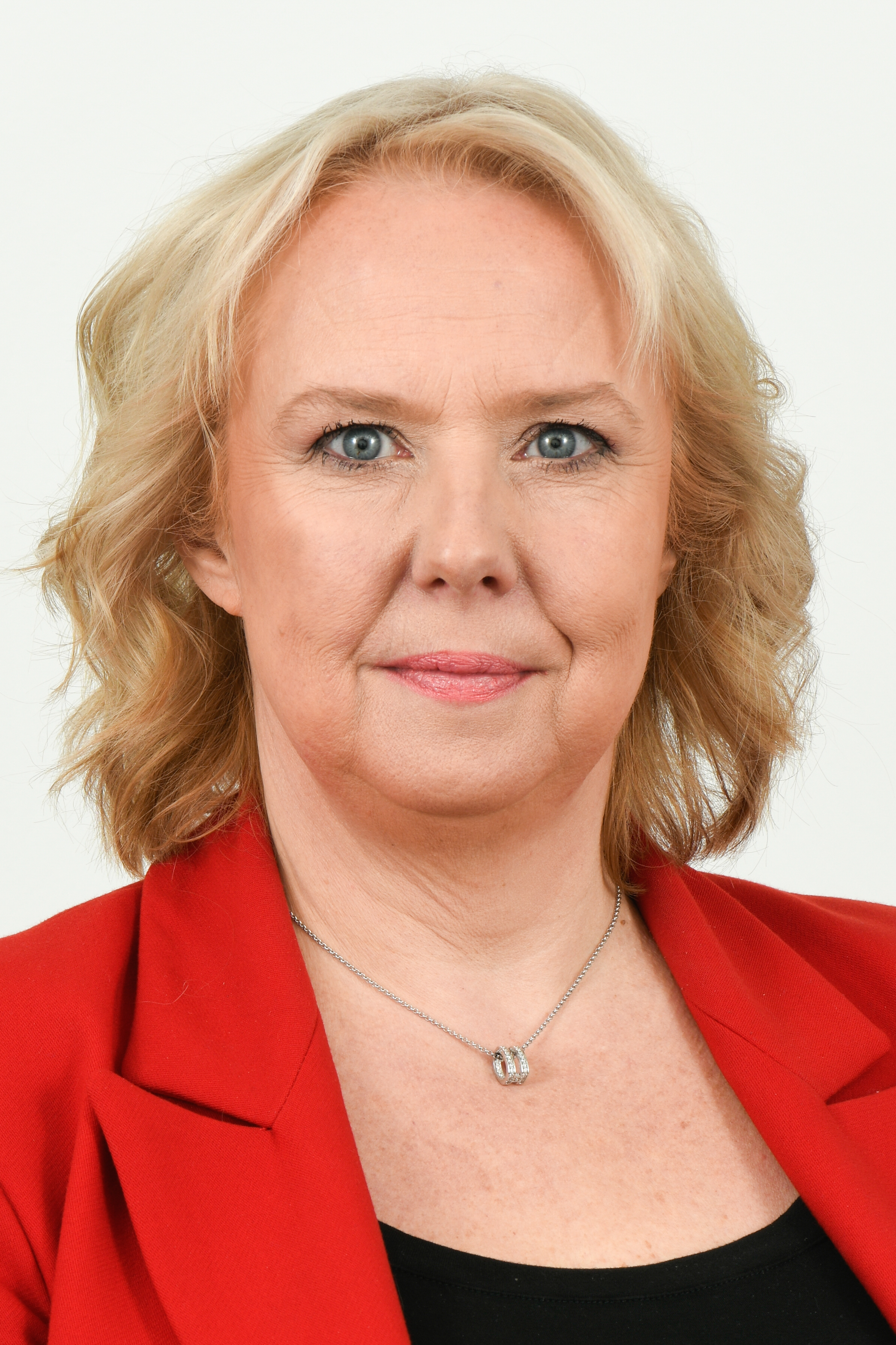

Member of the European Parliament for Central Italy
- In office 6 December 2022 – 15 July 2024
- Preceded by: Simona Bonafé

Personal details
- Born: 1 December 1968 (age 57) Florence, Italy
- Party: Democratic Party; Solidary Democracy

Beatrice Covassi (born 1 December 1968) is an Italian politician who has served as a Member of the European Parliament for the Democratic Party from 2022 to 2024.

== See also ==
- List of members of the European Parliament for Italy, 2019–2024
