= Francesca Peppucci =

Italian politician (born 1993)

Francesca Peppucci MEP
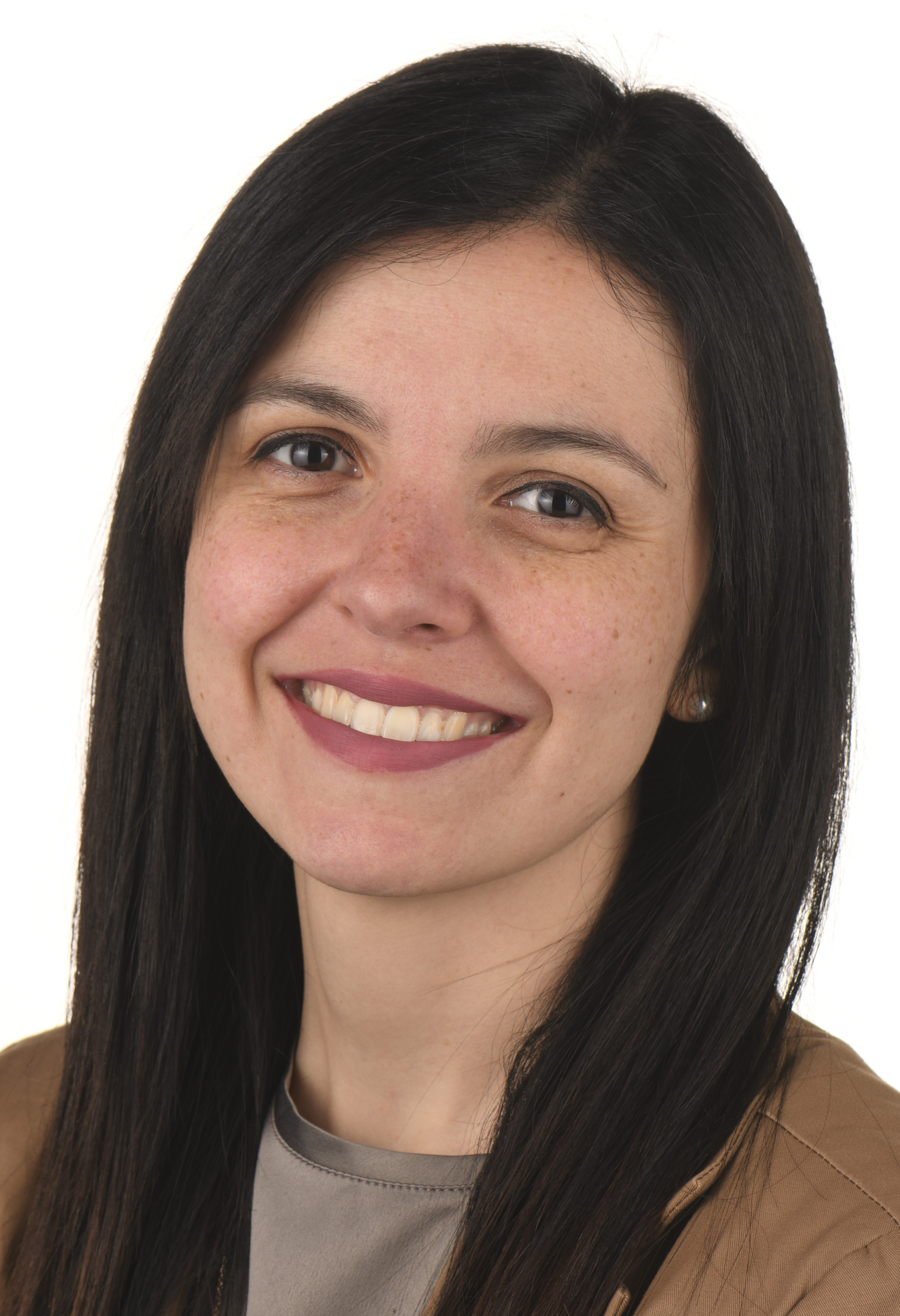

Member of the European Parliament for Central Italy
- Incumbent
- Assumed office 6 April 2023
- Preceded by: Luisa Regimenti

Personal details
- Born: 2 June 1993 (age 32) Todi, Italy
- Party: Forza Italia

Francesca Peppucci (born 2 June 1993) is an Italian politician who has been serving as a Member of the European Parliament for Forza Italia since 2023.

== See also ==
- List of members of the European Parliament for Italy, 2019–2024
