= Elisabetta De Blasis =

Italian politician (born 1974)

Elisabetta De Blasis MEP
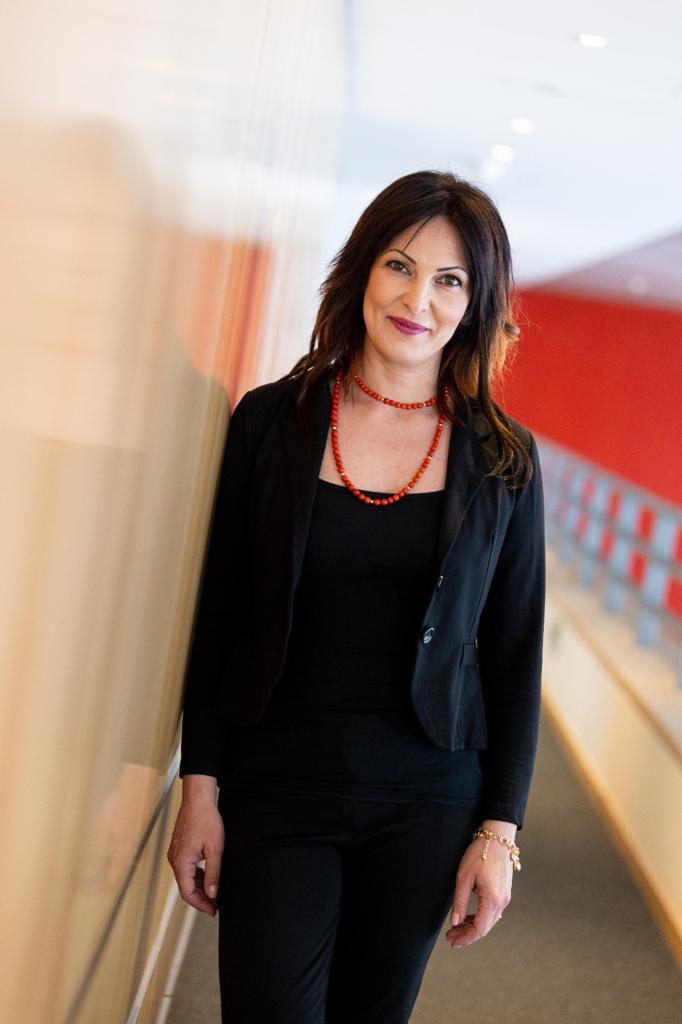

Member of the European Parliament for Southern Italy
- Incumbent
- Assumed office 2 November 2022
- Preceded by: Andrea Caroppo

Personal details
- Born: 30 April 1974 (age 51) Avezzano, Italy
- Party: Brothers of Italy (2020–2022; 2023–present)
- Other political affiliations: Forza Italia (2013–2018; 2022); Lega Nord (2018–2020; 2022–2023)
- Spouse: Angelo Cacchio
- Children: 3
- Profession: Cardiologist
- Website: https://www.europarl.europa.eu/meps/en/239262/ELISABETTA_DE+BLASIS/home

Elisabetta De Blasis (born 30 April 1974) is an Italian politician who has been serving as a Member of the European Parliament for Italy since 2022.

In September 2023, De Blasis switched from Lega (ID) to Brothers of Italy (ECR).

== See also ==
- List of members of the European Parliament for Italy, 2019–2024
