= Schirdewan =

Schirdewan is a German language surname of slavic origin. Notable people with the name include:

- Karl Schirdewan (1907–1998), German Communist activist
- Martin Schirdewan (1975), German journalist and politician
