= Carlo Ciccioli =

Italian politician (born 1952)

Carlo Ciccioli MEP
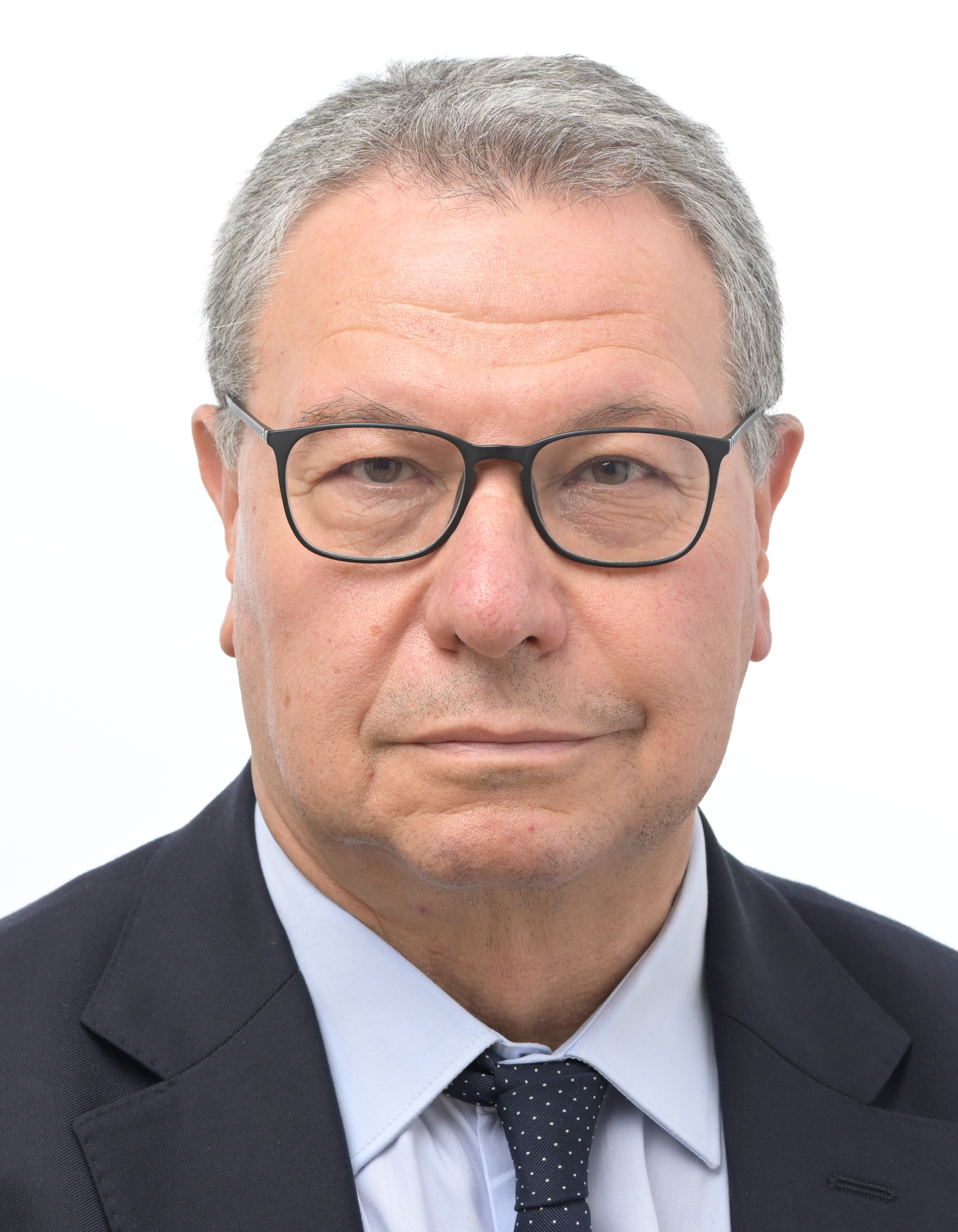
- Ciccioli in 2024

Member of the European Parliament for Central Italy
- Incumbent
- Assumed office 16 July 2024

Personal details
- Born: 19 November 1952 (age 73)
- Party: Brothers of Italy
- Other political affiliations: European Conservatives and Reformists Party

Carlo Ciccioli (born 19 November 1952) is an Italian politician of Brothers of Italy who was elected member of the European Parliament in 2024. He served in the Chamber of Deputies from 2006 to 2013.
