= Luisa Regimenti =

Italian politician

Luisa Regimenti MEP
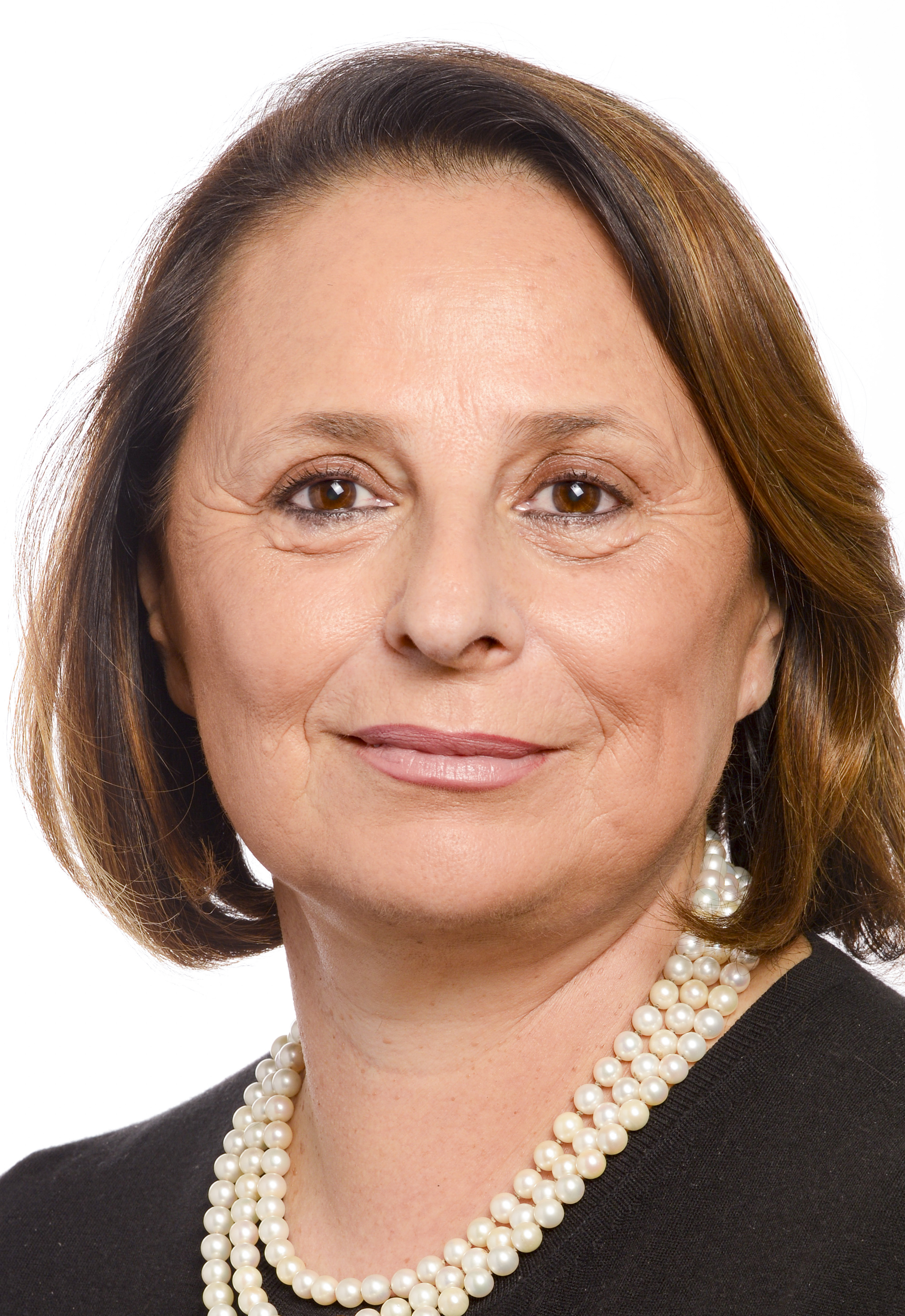

Member of the European Parliament for Central Italy
- In office 2 July 2019 – 6 April 2023
- Succeeded by: Francesca Peppucci

Personal details
- Party: Forza Italia (since 2021)
- Other political affiliations: League (until 2021)
- Profession: Coroner, politician

Luisa Regimenti (born 5 June 1958 in Rome) is an Italian Coroner and politician. She was a Member of the European Parliament from 2019 to 2023.
