= Antonella Sberna =

Italian politician (born 1982)

Antonella Sberna MEP
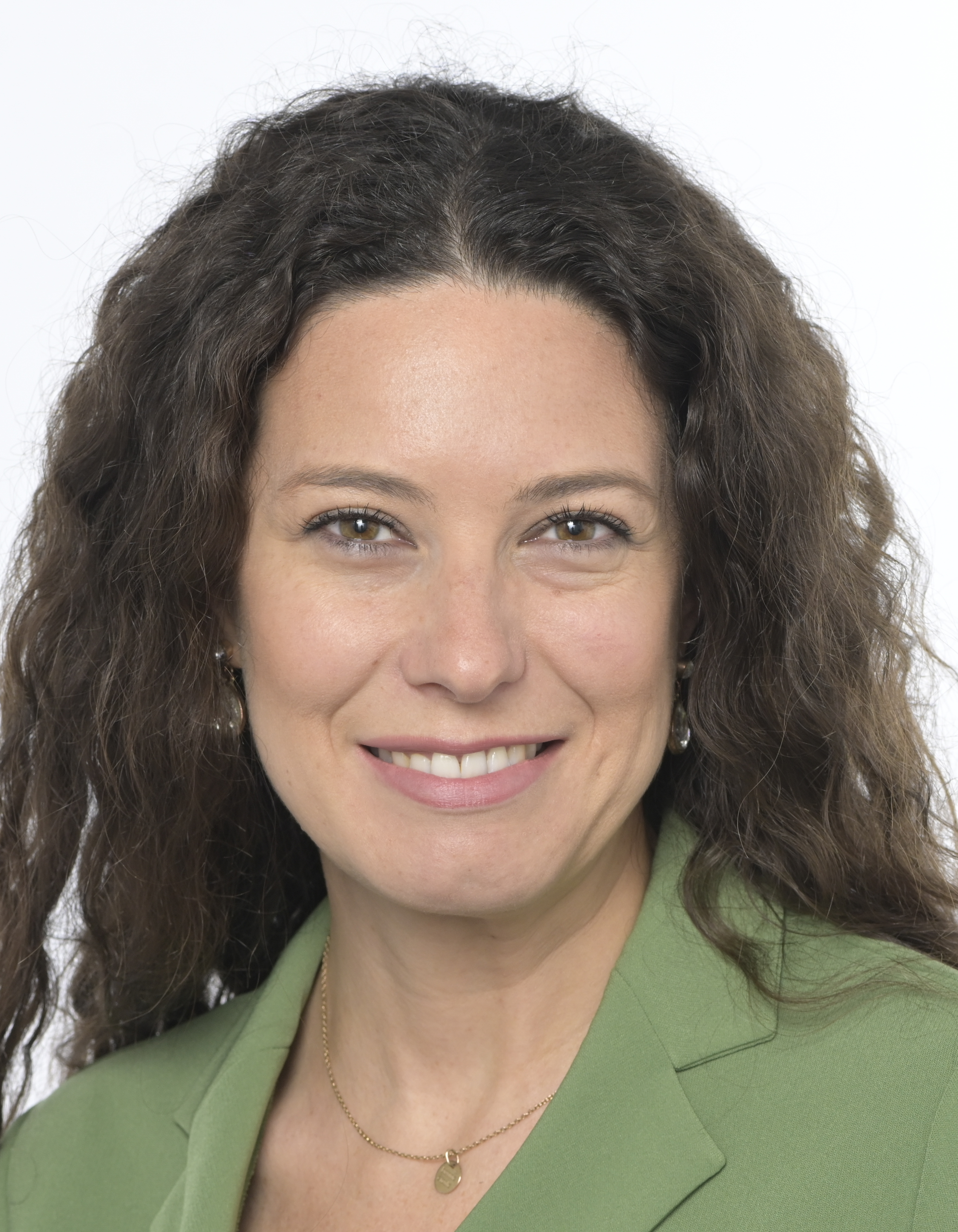
- Official portrait, 2024

Member of the European Parliament for Central Italy
- Incumbent
- Assumed office 16 July 2024

Personal details
- Born: 11 January 1982 (age 44)
- Party: Brothers of Italy
- Other political affiliations: European Conservatives and Reformists Party

Antonella Sberna (born 11 January 1982) is an Italian politician of Brothers of Italy who was elected member of the European Parliament in 2024. She was previously a councillor in Viterbo, and worked for the European Parliament, the consulate-general of Italy in Los Angeles, and the Senate of the Republic.

== Biography ==
The eldest of four siblings, Sberna earned a degree in Marketing, Consumer Studies, and Communication from IULM University of Milan. She worked as an intern at the European Parliament in Brussels and the Consulate General of Italy in Los Angeles, and spent six years in the public administration of the Senate of the Republic (Italy).

She worked at a communications and events agency until 2023.
