= Maria Angela Danzì =

Italian politician (born 1957)

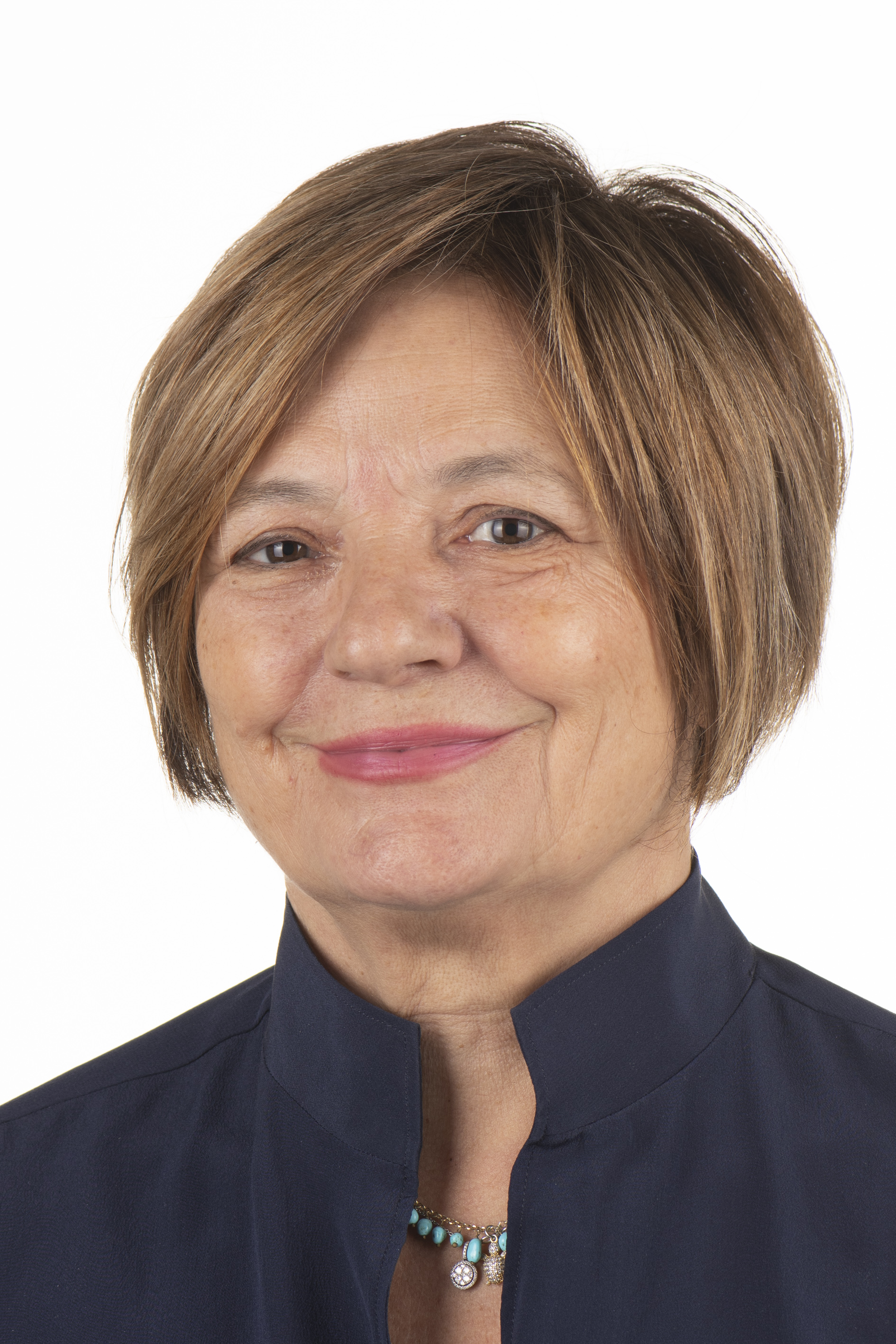

Member of the European Parliament for North-West Italy
- In office 3 October 2022 – 9 June 2024
- Preceded by: Eleonora Evi

Personal details
- Born: 5 July 1957 (age 69) Librizzi, Italy
- Party: Five Star Movement

Maria Angela Danzì (born 5 July 1957) is an Italian politician who served as a Member of the European Parliament for the Five Star Movement from 2022 to 2024.

== Biography ==
Born in Nasidi, a hamlet of Librizzi , in the province of Messina, she graduated in 1981 with a degree in Political Science, earning a grade of 110 with honors, with a thesis on price control policies. She won a scholarship by ranking among the top students nationwide and attended the Ministry of the Interior’s Training Course for Aspiring Municipal Secretaries during the 1981–82 academic year.

== See also ==
- List of members of the European Parliament for Italy, 2019–2024
