= Paola Ghidoni =

Italian politician (born 1963)

Paola Ghidoni MEP
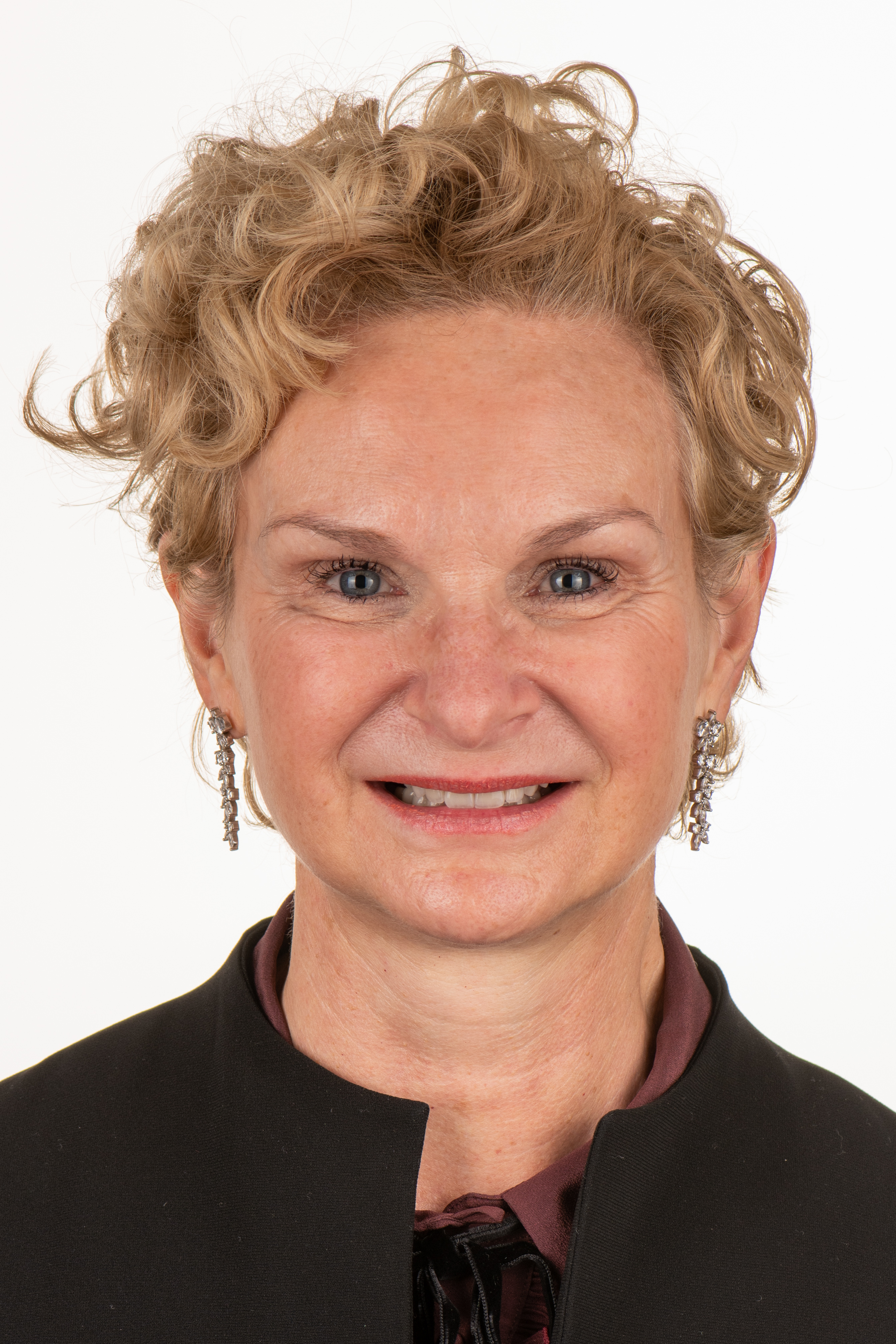

Member of the European Parliament for North-East Italy
- Incumbent
- Assumed office 3 October 2022
- Preceded by: Mara Bizzotto

Personal details
- Born: 8 July 1963 (age 62) Montecchio Maggiore, Italy
- Party: Lega Nord

Paola Ghidoni (born 8 July 1963) is an Italian politician who has been serving as a Member of the European Parliament for Lega Nord since 2022.

== See also ==
- List of members of the European Parliament for Italy, 2019–2024
