= Denis Nesci =

Italian conservative politician (born 1981)

Denis Nesci MEP
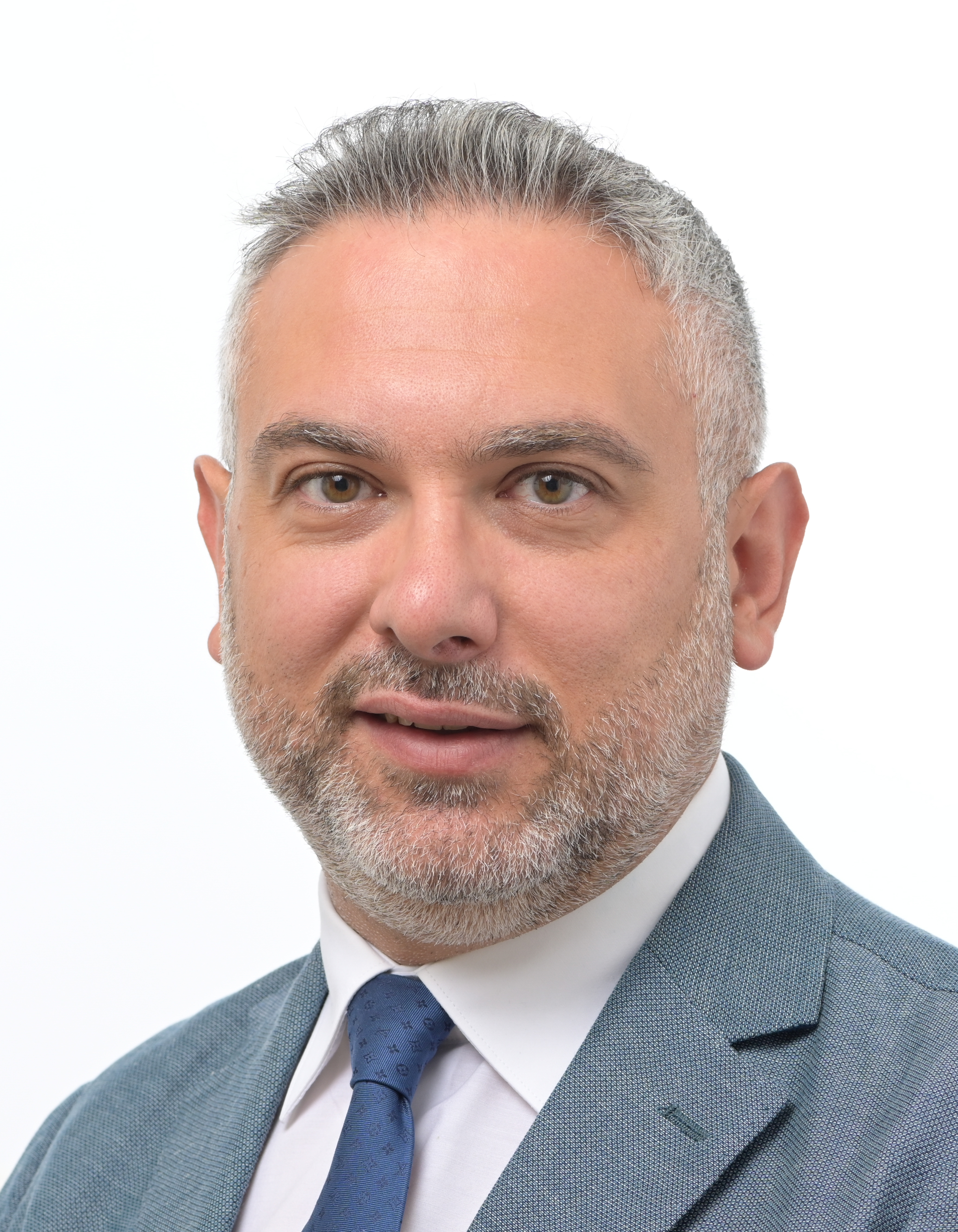

Member of the European Parliament for Southern Italy
- Incumbent
- Assumed office 3 October 2022
- Preceded by: Raffaele Fitto

Personal details
- Born: 25 July 1981 (age 44) Italy
- Party: Brothers of Italy

Denis Domenico Nesci (born 25 July 1981) is an Italian politician who has been serving as a Member of the European Parliament for the Brothers of Italy since 2022. He is a member of the European Conservatives and Reformists group, serving as the co-treasurer. He served on the 9th and 10th parliamentary term in the European Parliament.

He is a member of:

- Committee on Economic and Monetary Affairs
- Committee on the Internal Market and Consumer Protection
- Subcommittee on Tax Matters
- Delegation for relations with the Maghreb countries and the Arab Maghreb Union, including the EU-Morocco, EU-Tunisia and EU-Algeria Joint Parliamentary Committees
- Delegation to the Parliamentary Assembly of the Union for the Mediterranean

== See also ==
- List of members of the European Parliament for Italy, 2019–2024
