= Manon Aubry =

French politician (born 1989)

Manon Aubry MEP
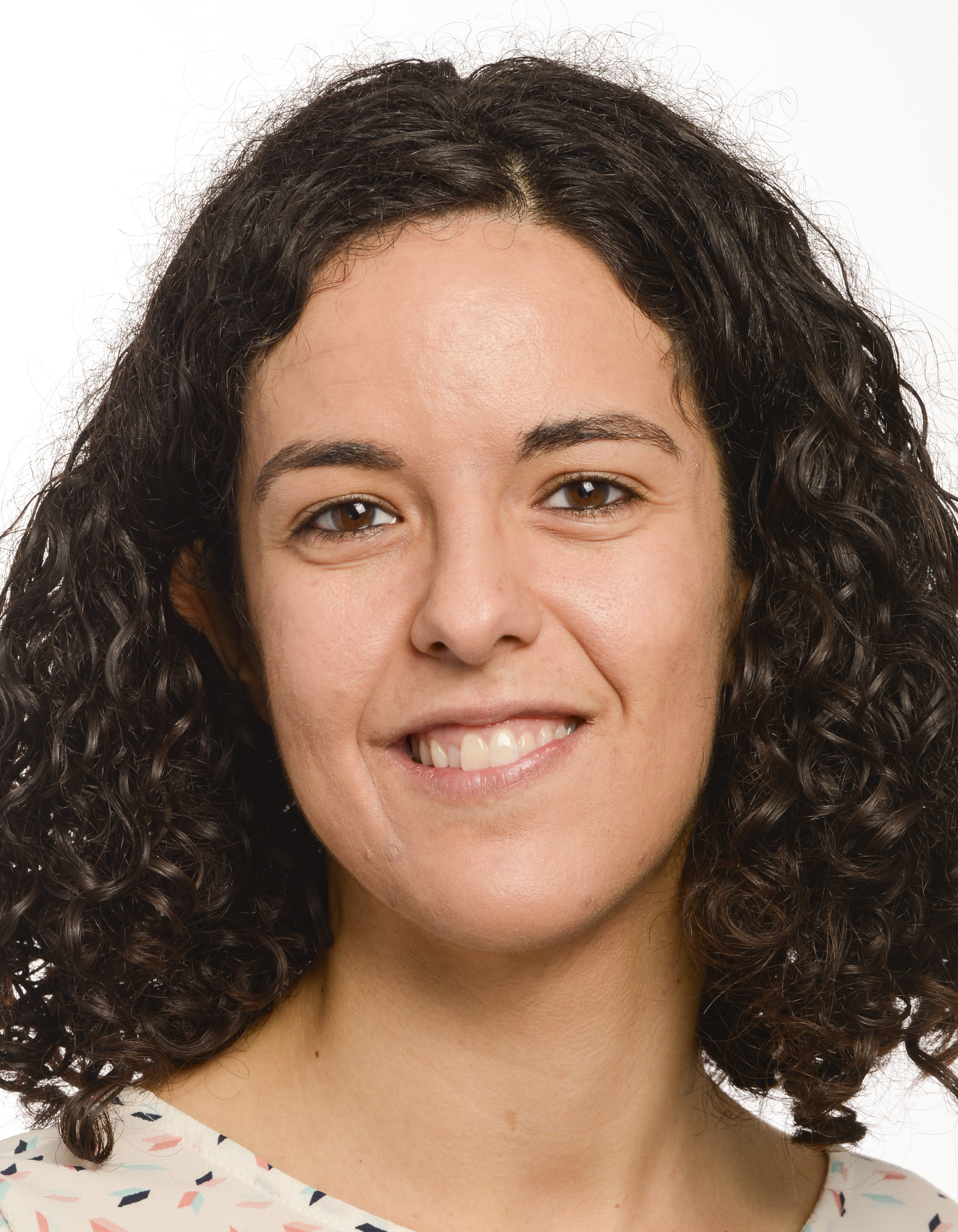
- Manon Aubry in 2019

Leader of The Left in the European Parliament – GUE/NGL
- Incumbent
- Assumed office 18 July 2019 Serving with Martin Schirdewan
- Preceded by: Gabriele Zimmer

Member of the European Parliament for France
- Incumbent
- Assumed office 1 July 2019

Personal details
- Born: 22 December 1989 (age 36) Fréjus, France
- Party: French: La France Insoumise (2018–present); EU: The Left in the European Parliament
- Education: Sciences Po; University of Sydney; Columbia University

Manon Aubry (French: [manɔ̃ obʁi]; born 22 December 1989) is a French politician who represents the left-wing party La France Insoumise (LFI). A former advocacy officer for Oxfam France, she won a seat in the 2019 European Parliament election and the same year was elected co-chair with Martin Schirdewan of The Left in the European Parliament (GUE/NGL) group. She retained her seat following the 2024 European Parliament election.

== Biography ==
Aubry was born in Fréjus in the department of Var. She is the daughter of journalists Bruno Aubry and Catherine Poggi-Aubry and has Corsican origins. (Note: She is not related to the French politician Martine Aubry.) She first became involved with political activism while studying at the Lycée Saint-Exupéry (sixth form college) in Saint-Raphaël in 2005, campaigning for the "no" vote in the referendum on the European Constitutional Treaty, and against the François Fillon educational reforms. In 2006, she organised a school protest against the First Employment Contract (contrat première embauche), a proposed law which would have made it easier for employers to dismiss young workers. She has credited her maternal grandfather, Modeste Poggi, who was a left-wing activist in Bonifacio, with inspiring her politics.

Aubry earned her Baccalauréat in 2007 with a mention très bien and continued her studies at Sciences Po in Paris, where she was president of the local branch of the National Union of Students of France (UNEF). After obtaining a degree in international relations and human rights, she spent a year at the School of International and Public Affairs, Columbia University, in New York. She then did humanitarian work in Africa for three years, with Médecins du Monde in Liberia and with the Carter Center in the Democratic Republic of Congo.

Returning to Paris, Aubry worked as a senior advocacy officer for Oxfam France from 2014 to 2018. Her particular area of interest was tax justice and inequality. She described how she tracked down multinationals who did not pay their fair share of taxes and rewarded their shareholders rather than the workers who produced the wealth. She also collaborated on a report about banks and tax havens. During this period, she lectured at Sciences Po on human rights.

== Political career ==
Although Aubry had no background in party politics, she was approached by Jean-Luc Mélenchon, leader of the far-left party La France Insoumise, to head the party's list of candidates in 2019 European Parliament election. In May 2019 she was elected to the European Parliament and in July 2019 she became the co-chair of The Left in the European Parliament (GUE/NGL) group together with German MEP Martin Schirdewan. She is also co-chair of the Intergroup on the Social Economy.

Within months of election as an MEP, Aubry embarked on the first stage of a bike tour of France with the object of meeting citizens and hearing their views. In November 2019, Aubry received a reprimand from the President of the European Parliament for having published on her YouTube and Twitter accounts a video inviting members of Extinction Rebellion to occupy the European Parliament.

To mark International Day for the Elimination of Violence against Women in November 2020, Aubry read out in the European Parliament the names of the 86 women killed by partners or ex-partners in France that year.

In April 2023 Aubry and MEPs of the Left tabled a motion for a debate about the actions of the police during demonstrations against Macron's pension reforms. The motion was blocked by other groups. Interviewed by Varsity, she said that state repression against pension protests had taken France from a country in "social crisis to a country in a crisis of democracy".

In January 2024, she was named head of the La France Insoumise list of candidates for the 2024 European elections.

During the Ninth European Parliament (2019-2024) Aubry has a seat on the following committees: Legal Affairs; Economic and Monetary Affairs; Tax Matters (subcommittee). She was a member of the Conference of Presidents and the Delegation to the Cariform-EU Parliamentary Committee. As rapporteur, she has drafted reports on the proposal for a directive of the European Parliament and of the Council on the minimum level of training of seafarers (codification) and on waivers of parliamentary immunity of Marc Tarabella, Andrea Cozzolino, Fulvio Martusciello and Nuno Melo.

Since becoming an MEP, Aubry has campaigned for the creation of an independent ethics body to enforce standards across EU institutions.

== Personal life ==
Aubry plays water polo, having practiced swimming competitively when she was at school.
