= Matteo Gazzini =

Italian politician (born 1985)

Hon. Matteo Gazzini MEP
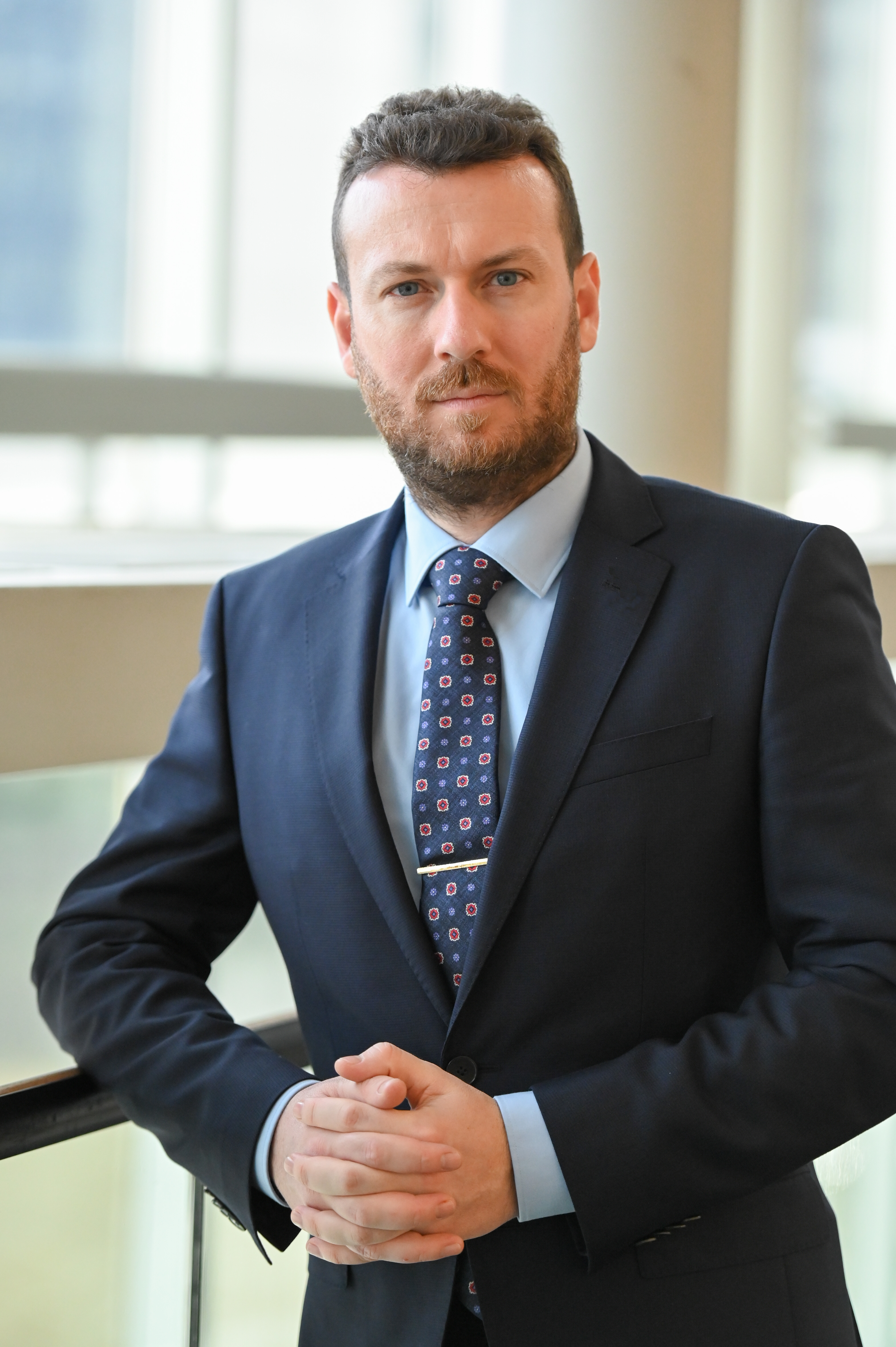
- Gazzini in 2023

Member of the European Parliament for North-East Italy
- Incumbent
- Assumed office 3 October 2022
- Preceded by: Marco Dreosto

Personal details
- Born: 9 July 1985 (age 41) Bolzano, Italy
- Party: Forza Italia (since 2023)
- Other political affiliations: Lega (until 2023)
- Education: Syracuse University
- Occupation: Politician, real estate developer, agricultural entrepreneur, airplane pilot
- Website: https://www.europarl.europa.eu/meps/it/239255/MATTEO_GAZZINI/history/9

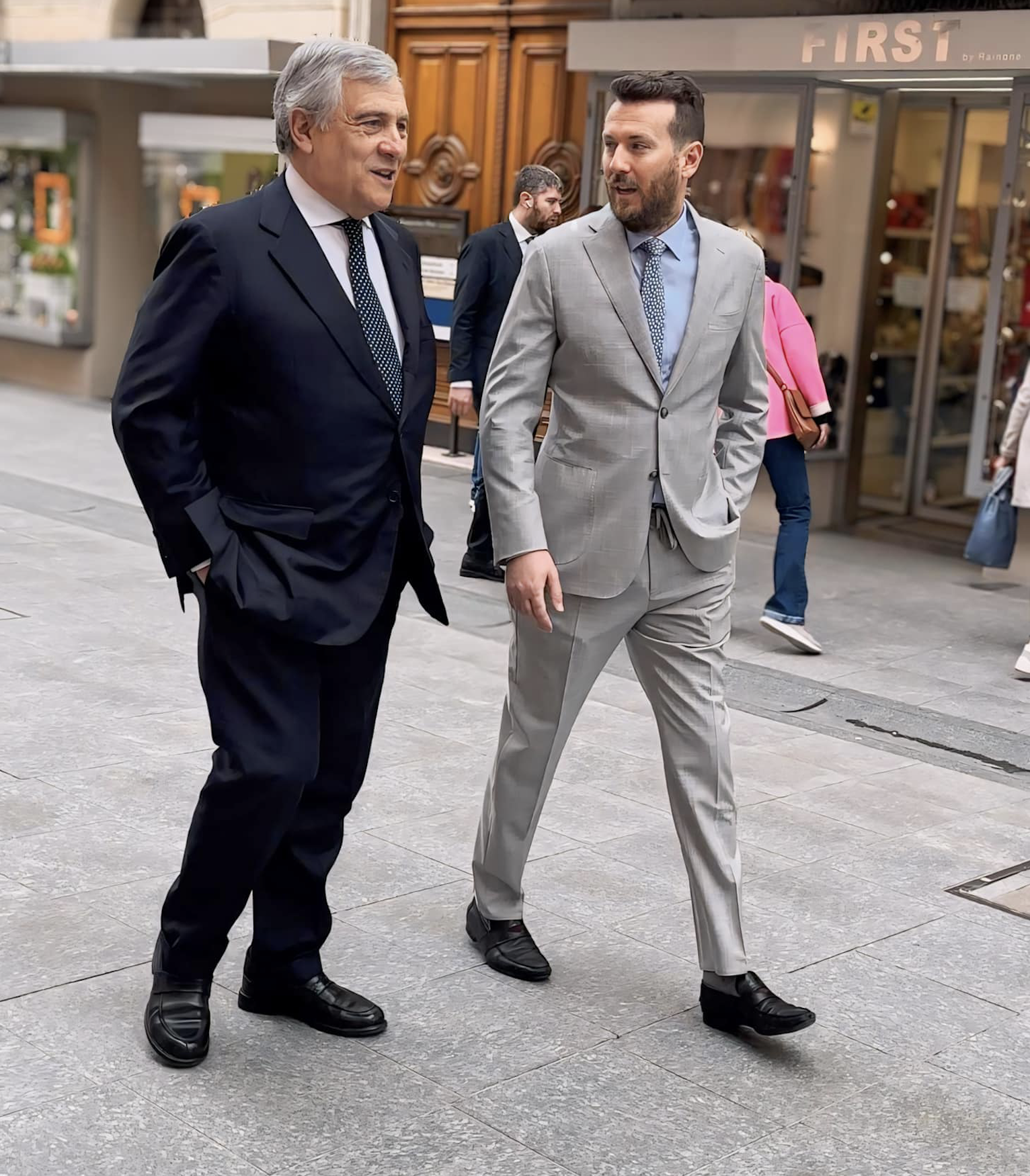
Deputy Prime Minister of Italy Hon. Antonio Tajani and Hon. Matteo Gazzini in Merano.

Matteo Gazzini (born 9 July 1985) is an Italian politician who served as a Member of the European Parliament for Lega and Forza Italia from 2022 to 2024.

In December 2023, he left Lega to join Forza Italia and became party leader in South Tyrol.

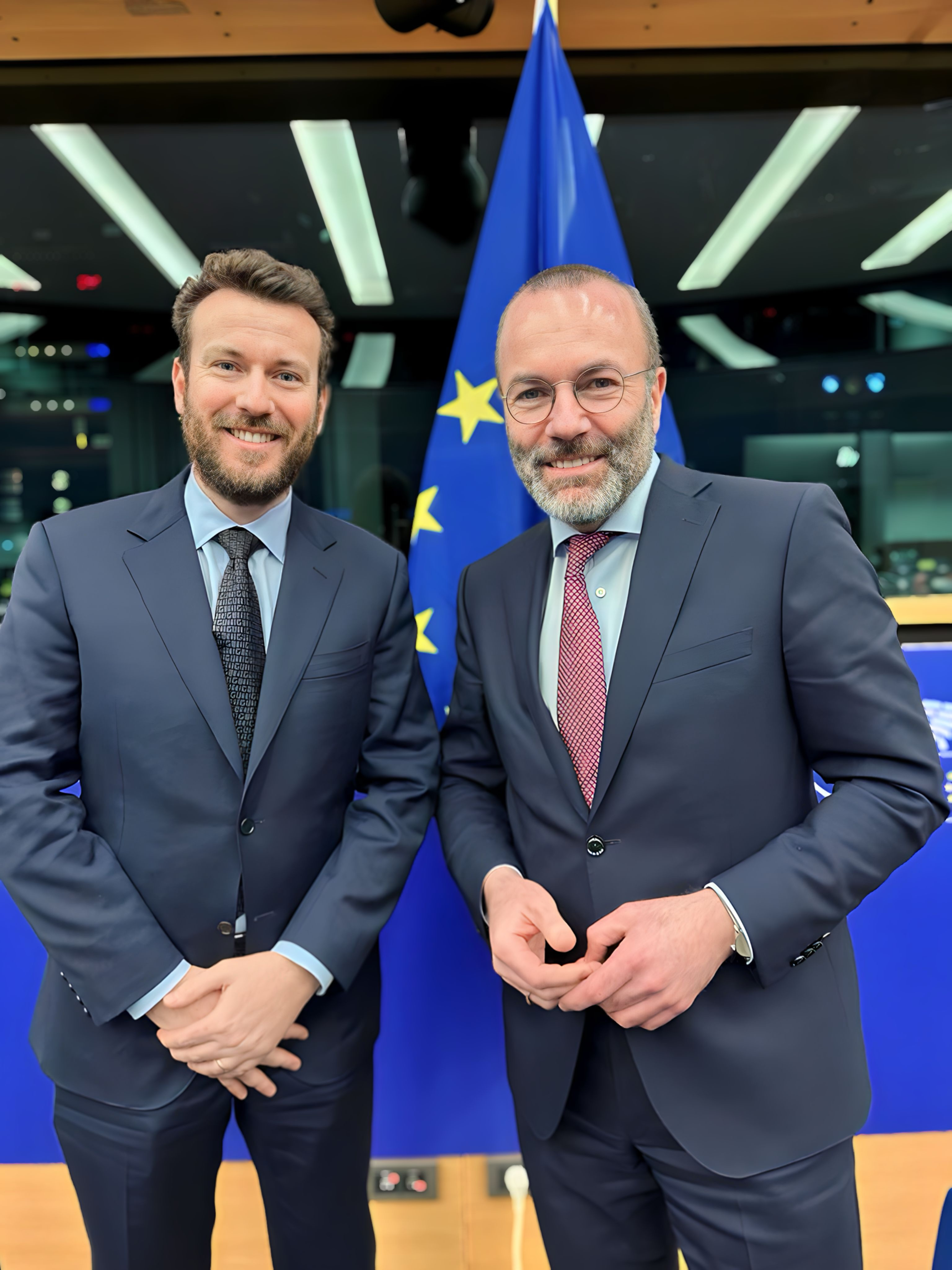
The President of the EPP Group in the European Parliament, Manfred Weber, and Matteo Gazzini.

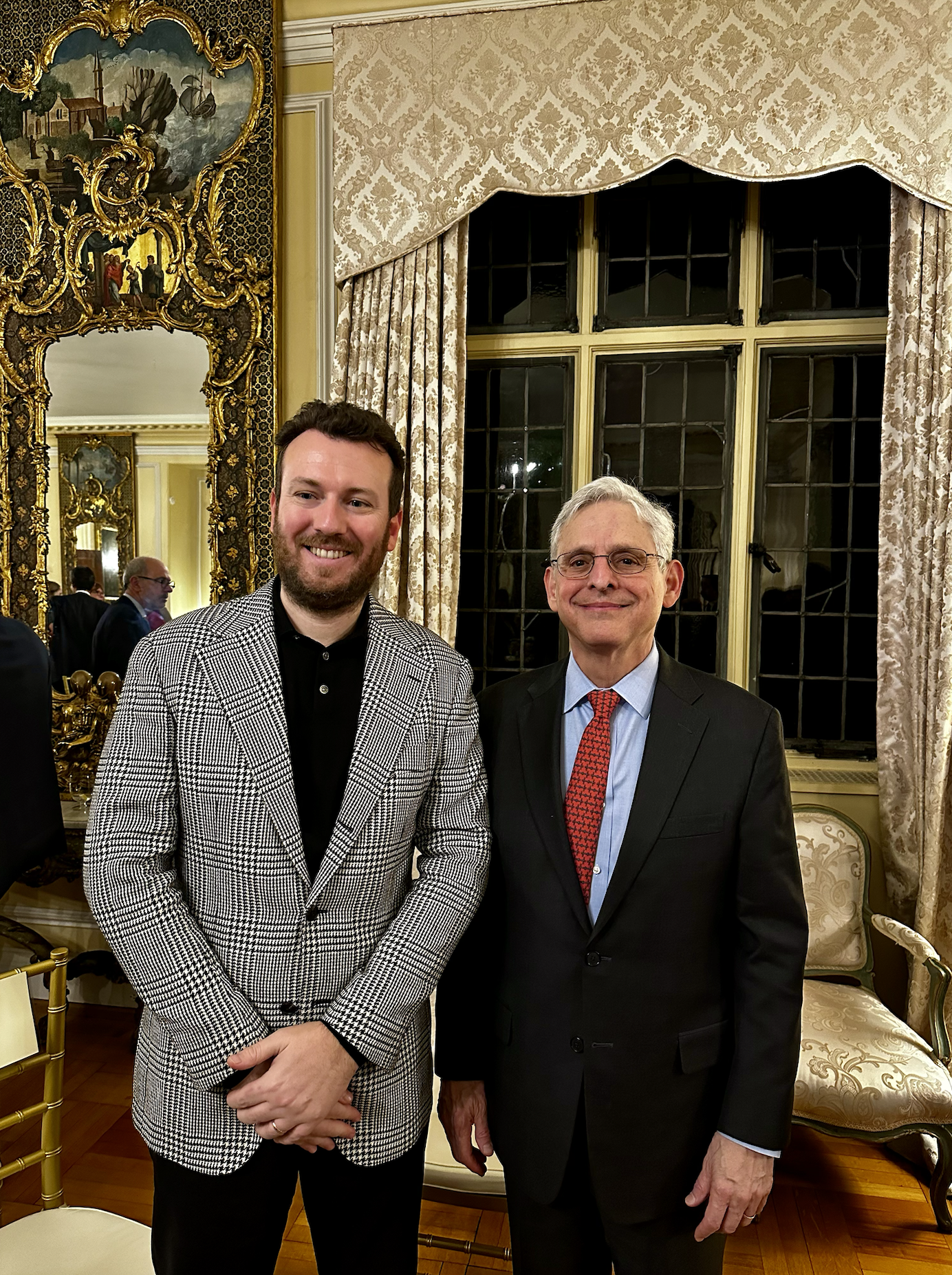
Attorney General Merrick Garland and Matteo Gazzini at the Italian Embassy in Washington D.C.

In January 2024 he joined the EPP group in the European Parliament.

As a Member of the European Parliament (MEP), Matteo Gazzini has been actively involved in several key committees and delegations. He was a member of the Committee on Industry, Research and Energy (ITRE), where he contributed to significant legislative developments, including the "Cyber Resilience Act". Gazzini also served on the Committee on Budgets, the Committee on Transport and Tourism, and the Committee on the Environment, Public Health and Food Safety.

He was part of the Delegation for relations with the United States and the Delegation for relations with the Federative Republic of Brazil, working to foster international cooperation and strengthen transatlantic ties.

Gazzini was one of the several members of the European Parliament interviewed by "Voice of Europe", media allegedly involved in the 2024 Russian Influential Network.

== See also ==
- List of members of the European Parliament for Italy, 2019–2024
