= Francesco Torselli =

Italian politician (born 1976)

Francesco Torselli MEP
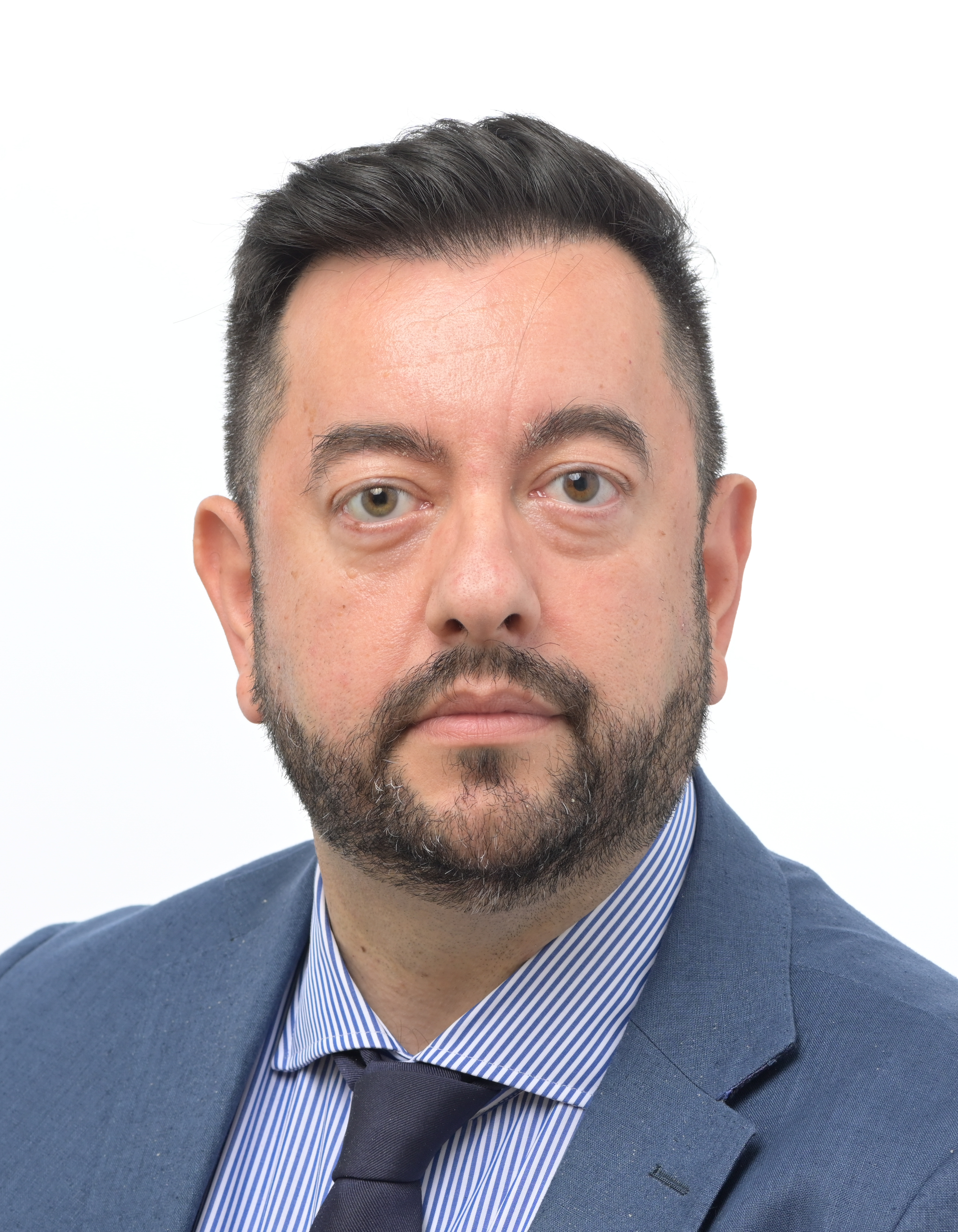
- Torselli in 2024

Member of the European Parliament for Central Italy
- Incumbent
- Assumed office 16 July 2024

Member of the Regional Council of Tuscany
- In office 8 October 2020 – 9 July 2024

Personal details
- Born: 9 March 1976 (age 50) Florence, Italy
- Party: Brothers of Italy
- Other political affiliations: European Conservatives and Reformists Party

Francesco Torselli (born 9 March 1976) is an Italian politician of Brothers of Italy who was elected member of the European Parliament in 2024.

== Early life and career ==
Torselli was born in Florence in 1976. He joined the Youth Front on the morning after the Capaci bombing, because he considered it to be the furthest from the Tangentopoli. In 1999, he was elected president of Youth Action in Florence. From 2009 to 2019 he served as city councillor of Florence, and in the 2020 regional election he was elected to the Regional Council of Tuscany. He was chosen as group leader of the Brothers of Italy on the council in the same year, and held the role until his election to the European Parliament.
