= Marco Falcone (politician) =

Italian politician (born 1971)

Marco Falcone MEP
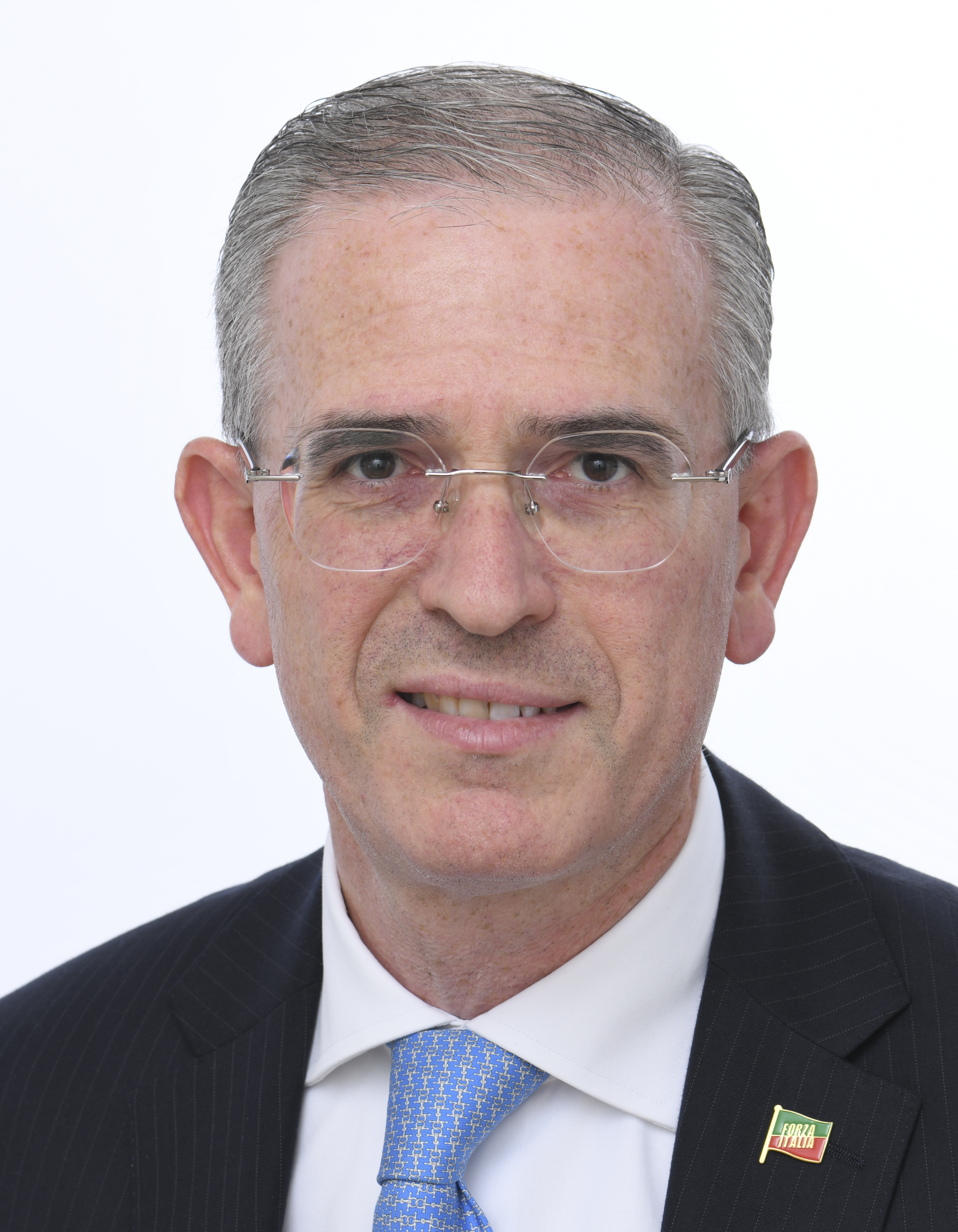

Member of the European Parliament for Italian Islands
- Incumbent
- Assumed office 16 July 2024

Personal details
- Born: 5 January 1971 (age 55)
- Party: Forza Italia
- Other political affiliations: European People's Party

Marco Falcone (born 5 January 1971) is an Italian politician of Forza Italia who was elected member of the European Parliament in 2024. He served as assessor of the economy in Sicily from 2022 to 2024, and assessor for infrastructure and mobility from 2017 to 2022.
