= Rosa D'Amato =

Italian politician

Rosa D'Amato MEP
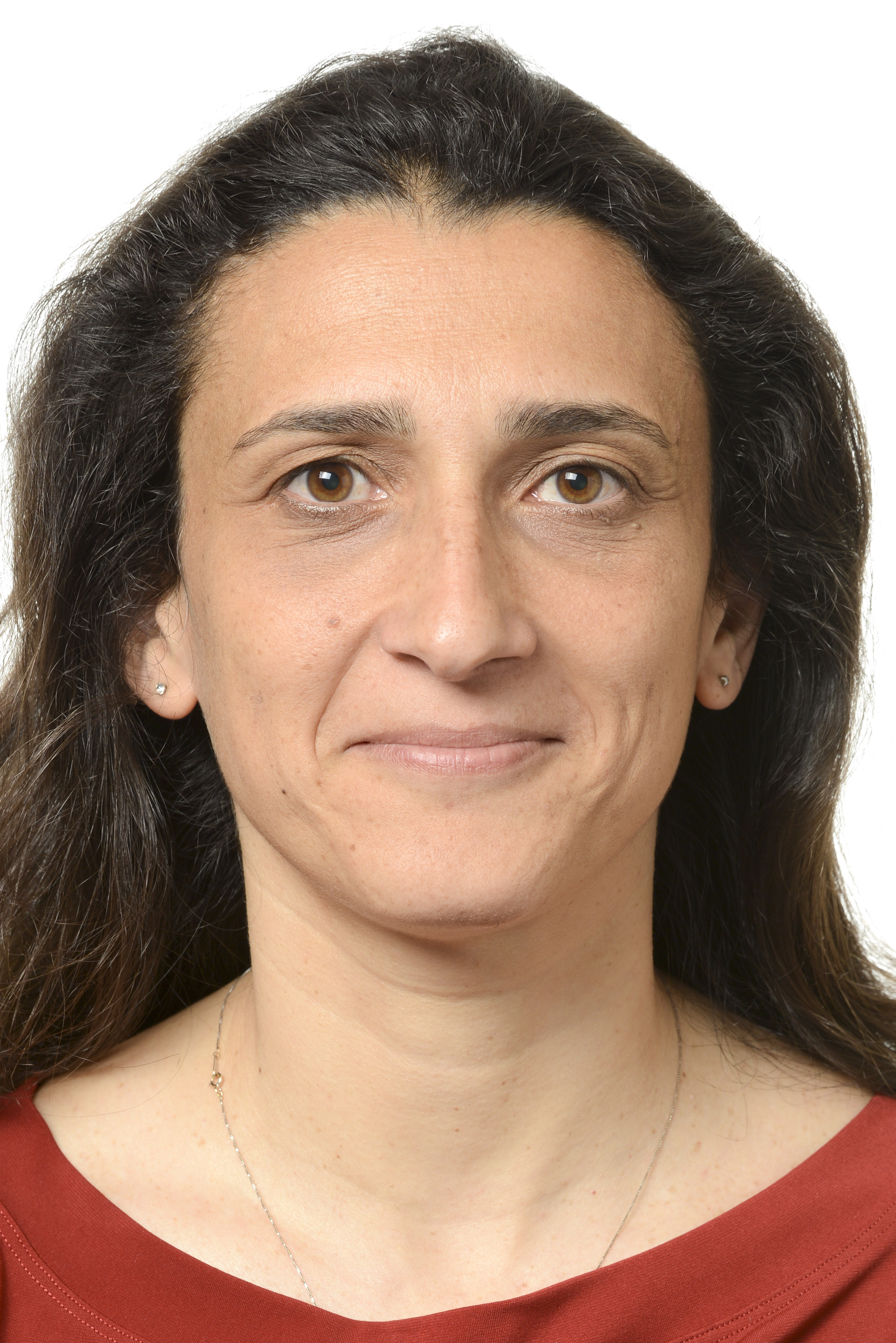

Member of the European Parliament for Southern Italy
- Incumbent
- Assumed office 1 July 2014

Personal details
- Party: Five Star Movement (2014-2020); Independent (2020-present)
- Education: University of Florence

Rosa D'Amato (born 30 March 1969 in Taranto) is an Italian politician who was first elected as a member of the European Parliament in 2014 and re-elected in 2019. She joined the Greens/EFA group in December 2020 together with her colleagues Ignazio Corrao, Eleonora Evi and Piernicola Pedicini.
