= Martin Schirdewan =

German journalist and politician (born 1975)

Martin Schirdewan MEP
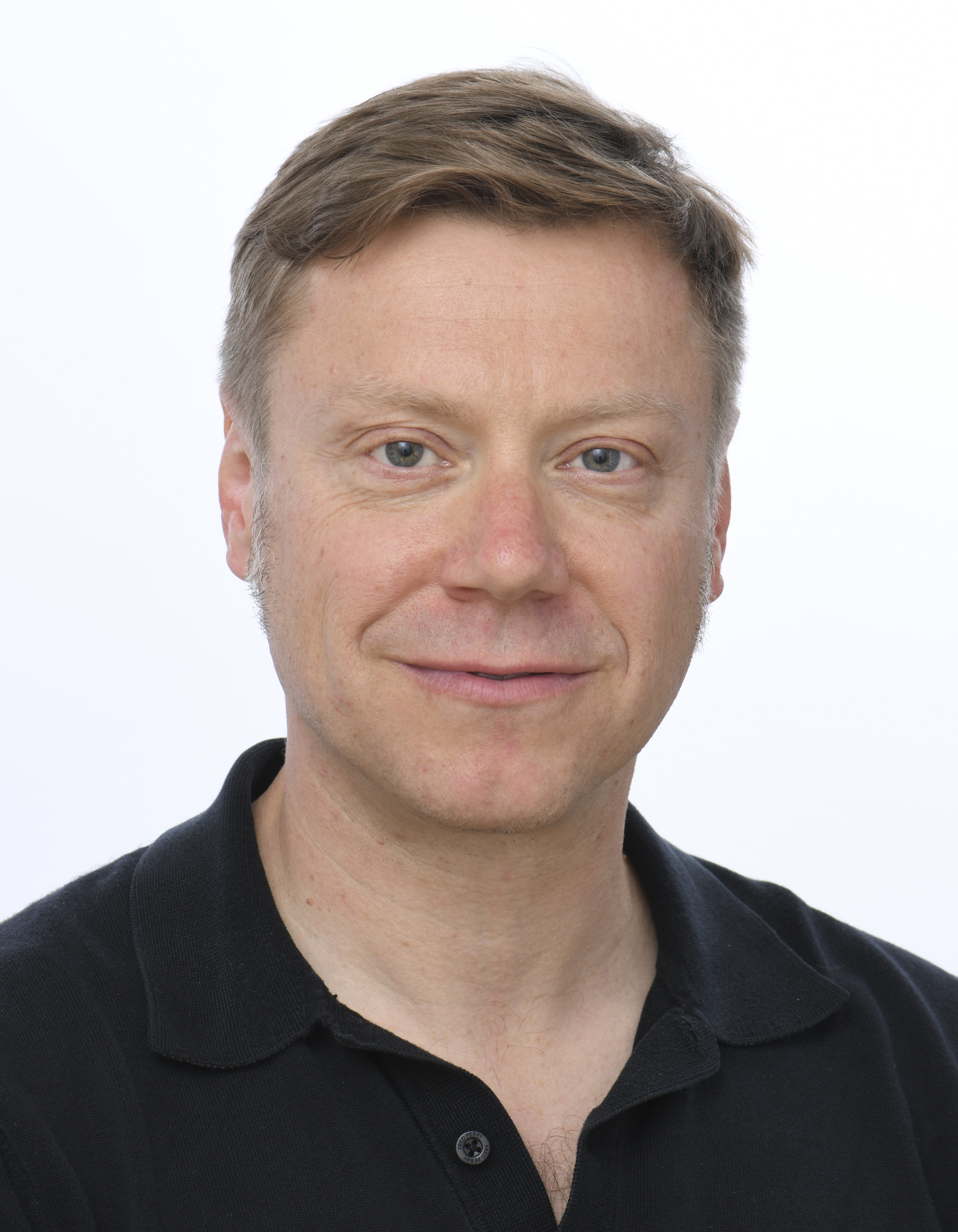
- Official portrait, 2024

Leader of The Left
- In office 25 June 2022 – 19 October 2024 Serving with Janine Wissler
- Deputy: Ates Gürpinar; Lorenz Gösta Beutin; Katina Schubert; Jana Seppelt
- Preceded by: Susanne Hennig-Wellsow
- Succeeded by: Ines Schwerdtner

Leader of The Left in the European Parliament – GUE/NGL
- Incumbent
- Assumed office 18 July 2019 Serving with Manon Aubry
- Preceded by: Gabriele Zimmer

Member of the European Parliament for Germany
- Incumbent
- Assumed office 8 November 2017
- Preceded by: Fabio De Masi

Personal details
- Born: 12 July 1975 (age 51) East Berlin, East Germany (now Berlin, Germany)
- Party: The Left
- Children: 1
- Relatives: Karl Schirdewan (grandfather)
- Education: Free University of Berlin (Dr. rer. pol.)
- Occupation: Politician; Journalist; Political Staffer
- Website: Official website

Martin Simon Schirdewan (born 12 July 1975) is a German journalist and politician who served as co-chairman of The Left from June 2022 to October 2024. He has sat as a Member of the European Parliament (MEP) since 2017, and was elected co-chair of The Left in the European Parliament (GUE/NGL) parliamentary group in 2019.

== Political career ==
Schirdewan was born in East Berlin. From 1998 to 2003, he studied at the Free University of Berlin, before achieving a doctorate in political science in 2007.

Between 2001 and 2008, Schirdewan was editor of the magazine Utopie kreativ (Creative Utopia), published by the Rosa Luxemburg Foundation. From 2006 until 2015, he was a researcher for a Bundestag member from The Left and was senior editor of Sacco & Vanzetti, the youth magazine of socialist daily newspaper Neues Deutschland. From 2015 until his appointment to the European Parliament, he was head of the Brussels office of the Rosa Luxemburg Foundation and of its Athens "liaison office", as well as establishing a liaison office in Madrid. From 2012 to 2015 and again in 2018, Schirdewan served on the party executive of The Left. Since being appointed to the European Parliament, Schirdewan has served as a member of the Committee on Economic and Monetary Affairs (ECON), and as a substitute for the Committee on the Internal Market and Consumer Protection (IMCO).

Schirdewan was one of The Left's top candidates in the 2019 European Parliament election in Germany alongside Özlem Demirel. The party won 5.5% of votes and five seats, making it the joint second largest party in the GUE/NGL group by seat count, behind Syriza and tied with La France Insoumise. In the new Parliament, Schirdewan was elected co-chair of the GUE/NGL faction alongside French MEP Manon Aubry.

At a federal Left congress in June 2022, Schirdewan was elected co-leader of the party with 341 votes (61.3%) alongside incumbent Janine Wissler. He was challenged by several candidates, including Sören Pellmann, who won 176 votes (31.6%). Within the party, he is considered a reformer close in outlook to moderates such as Dietmar Bartsch.

== Political positions ==
On 2 March 2022, Schirdewan was one of 13 MEPs who voted against a motion condemning the Russian invasion of Ukraine. He stated that, though he condemned the invasion as a blatant breach of international law, he opposed arms shipments to Ukraine on the grounds that it violated EU directives on exports to war and crisis zones.

On 15 September 2022, he was first one of 28 MEPs who voted abstain, then one of 19 MEPs who voted against in a resolution condemning President Daniel Ortega of Nicaragua for human rights violations, in particular the arrest of Bishop Rolando Álvarez.

== Personal life ==
Schirdewan is a grandson of East German politician Karl Schirdewan and his wife Gisela.

He was born in Berlin.
