= Ignazio Corrao =

Italian politician (born 1984)

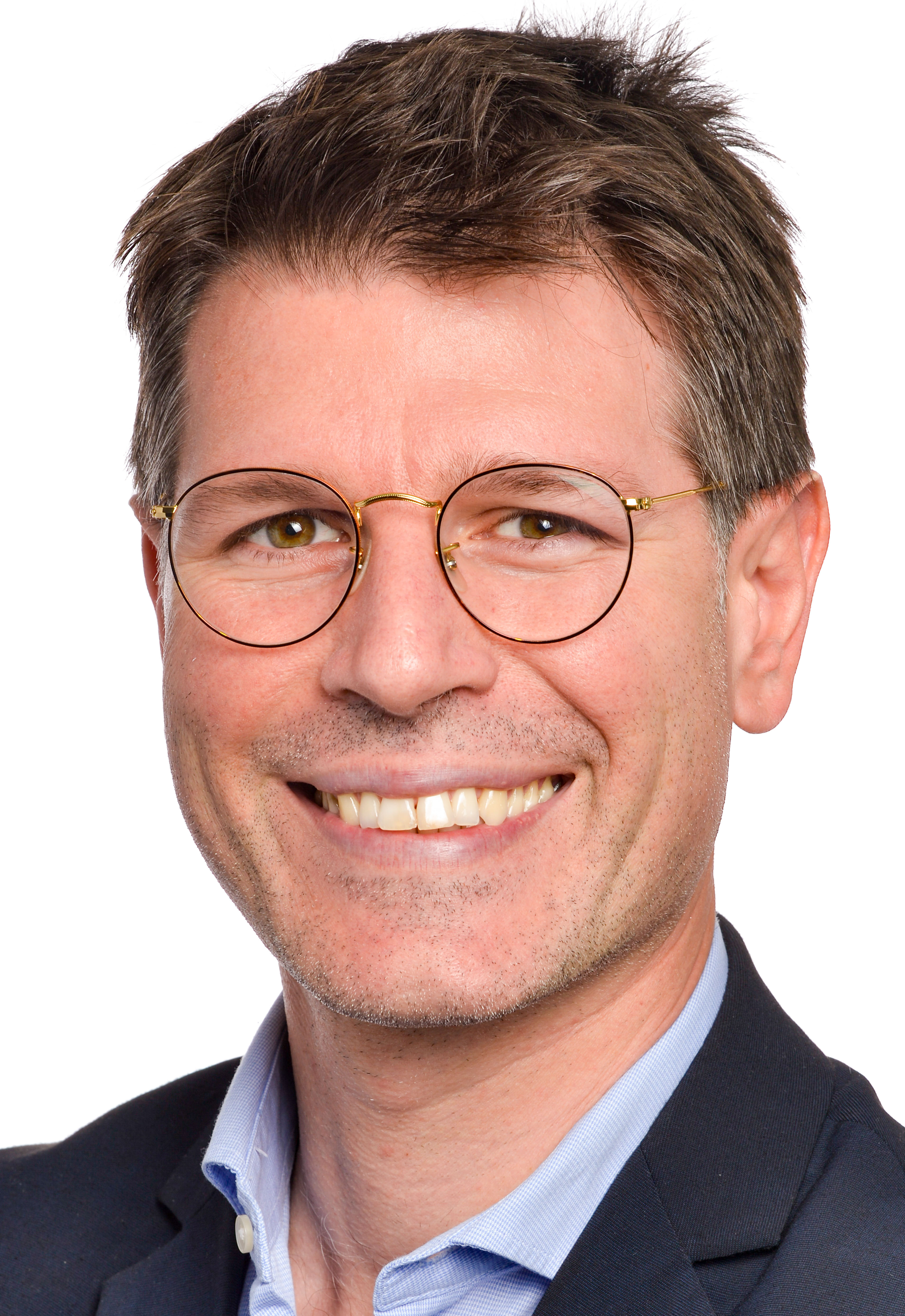

Member of the European Parliament for Italian Islands
- In office 1 July 2014 – 15 July 2024

Personal details
- Born: 14 January 1984 (age 42) Rome, Italy
- Party: Five Star Movement (2013–2020); Independent (2020–present)
- Other political affiliations: Europe of Freedom and Direct Democracy (2014–2019); Greens–European Free Alliance (2020–2024)
- Education: University of Palermo
- Occupation: Lawyer
- Website: European Parliament website

Ignazio Corrao (born 14 January 1984) is an Italian lawyer and politician who served as a member of the European Parliament (MEP) from 2014 to 2024. A member of the Five Star Movement (M5S) until 2020, when he became an independent, he represented the Italian Islands constituency in the European Parliament.

Corrao was born in Rome and grew up in Alcamo, Sicily. He graduated from the University of Palermo.

== Education and career ==
Corrao, who graduated in law from the University of Palermo, qualified as a lawyer at the Palermo Court of Appeal. In the 2014 European Parliament election he was elected to the European Parliament in the Italian Islands (European Parliament constituency), getting the highest number of preference votes among the Five Star Movement candidates.

In June 2014, he was elected the first leader of the Five Star Movement's group in Parliament, becoming one of the youngest representatives to get this role in the European Union. Considered one of first political exponents of the Erasmus generation, he has gained various experiences of work, study and volunteering abroad at a very young age.

In December 2020, he joined the Greens/EFA group together with his colleagues Rosa D'Amato, Eleonora Evi and Piernicola Pedicini.
