= Piernicola Pedicini =

Italian politician

Piernicola Pedicini MEP
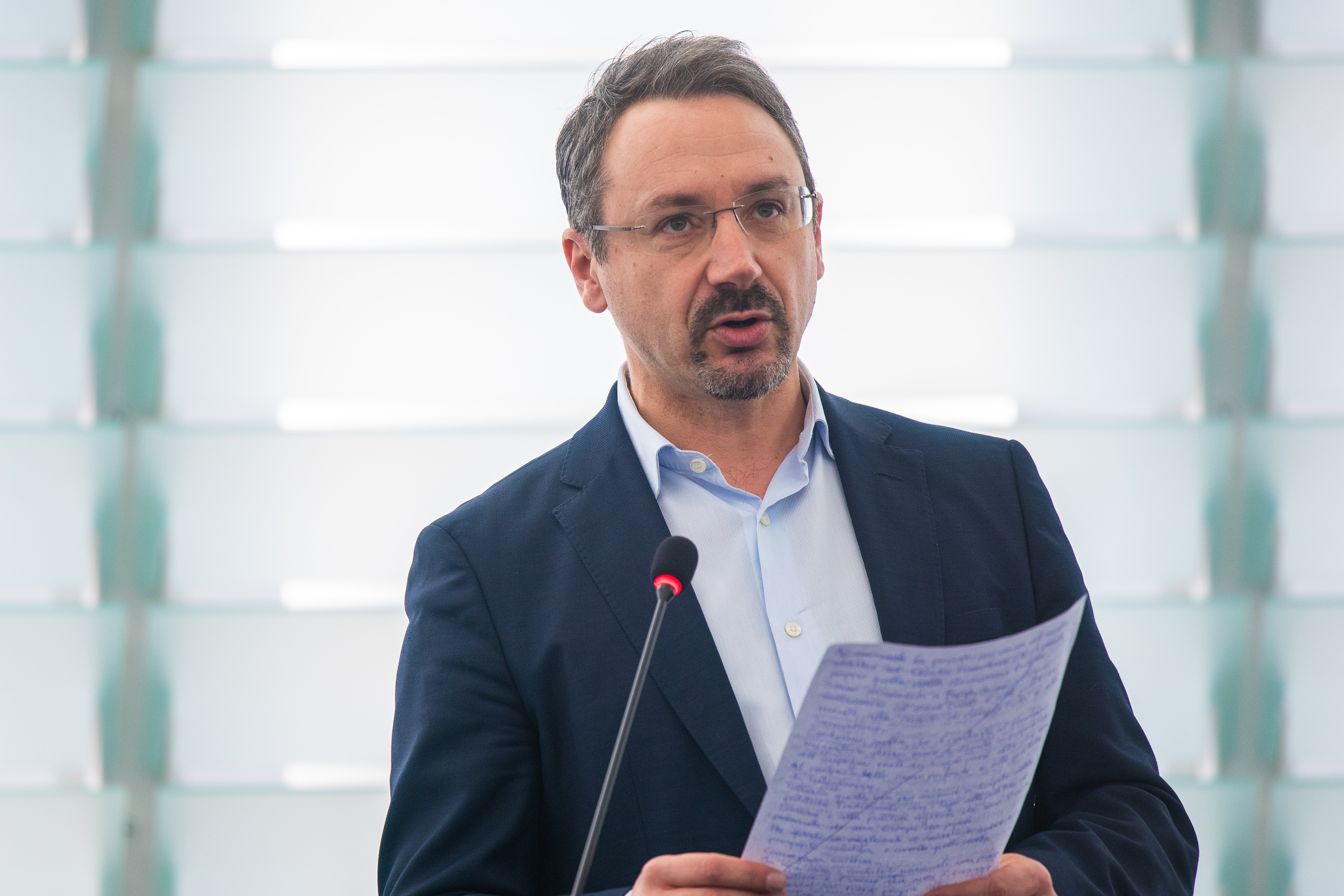
- Pedicini in 2020

Member of the European Parliament for Southern Italy
- Incumbent
- Assumed office 1 July 2014

Personal details
- Party: August 24th Movement (since 2021)
- Other political affiliations: Five Star Movement (2013–2020); Independent (2020–2021)
- Education: University of Naples Federico II
- Occupation: Researcher

Piernicola Pedicini (born 22 May 1969 in Benevento) is an Italian politician and member of the European Parliament since 2014. In December 2020, he joined the Greens/EFA group together with his colleagues Rosa D'Amato, Ignazio Corrao and Eleonora Evi.

In addition to his committee assignments, Pedicini is a member of the MEPs Against Cancer group.
