= Eleonora Evi =

Italian politician (born 1983)

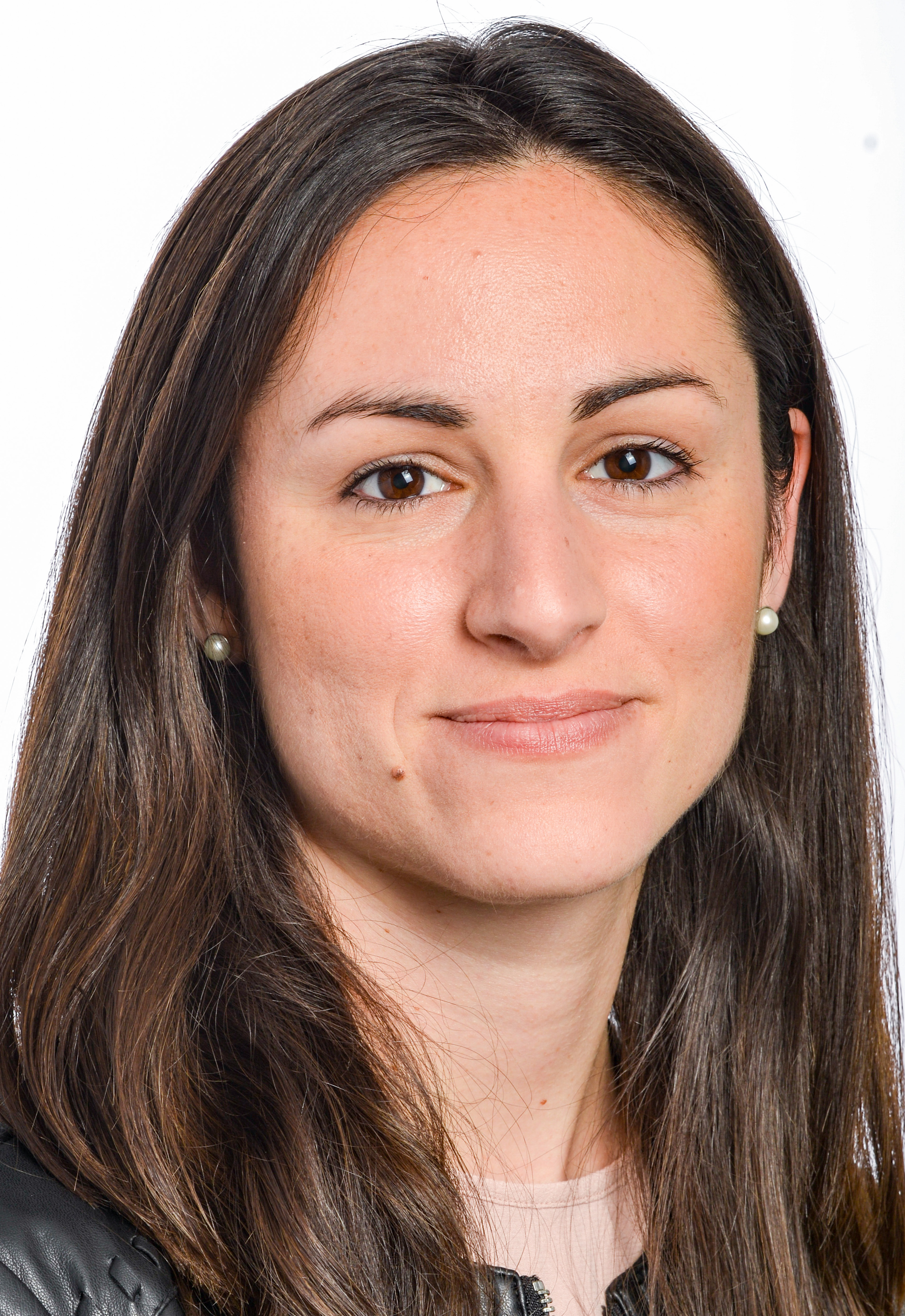

Spokesperson of Green Europe
- In office 10 July 2021 – 30 November 2023 Serving with Angelo Bonelli
- Preceded by: Office established
- Succeeded by: Office abolished

Member of the Chamber of Deputies
- Incumbent
- Assumed office 13 October 2022
- Constituency: Lombardy 1

Member of the European Parliament
- In office 1 July 2014 – 12 October 2022
- Succeeded by: Maria Angela Danzì
- Constituency: North-West Italy

Personal details
- Born: 20 November 1983 (age 42) Milan, Italy
- Party: PD (2024–present)
- Other political affiliations: M5S (2013–2020); EV (2021–2023)
- Education: Polytechnic University of Milan
- Profession: Designer

Eleonora Evi (born 20 November 1983) is an Italian politician. Between July 2021 and November 2023, Evi was the spokesperson of Green Europe, sharing the leadership of the party with Angelo Bonelli.

== Biography ==
Born in Milan, Evi has been elected as a Member of the European Parliament in 2014, and was re-elected in 2019. She joined the Greens–European Free Alliance group in December 2020 together with her colleagues Rosa D'Amato, Ignazio Corrao and Piernicola Pedicini.

In April 2024, she joined the Democratic Party.
