= Camilla Laureti =

Italian politician

Camilla Laureti MEP
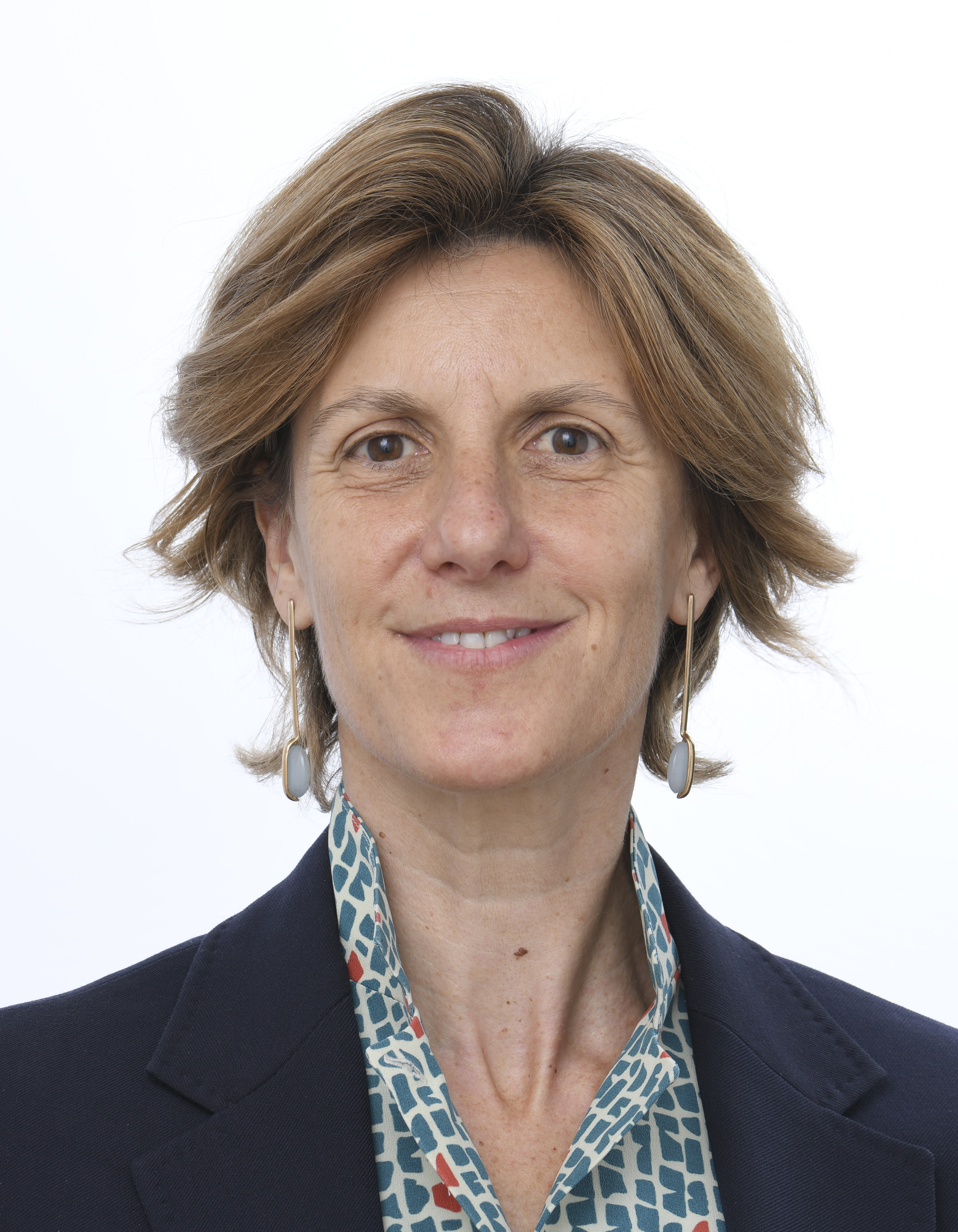

Member of the European Parliament for Central Italy
- Incumbent
- Assumed office 11 January 2022

Personal details
- Born: 20 May 1975 (age 51) Rome, Italy
- Party: Democratic Party
- Education: Sapienza University of Rome
- Profession: Journalist

Camilla Laureti (born 20 May 1975) is an Italian politician and journalist, who is a Member of the European Parliament since 2022.

== Early life ==
Camilla Laureti was born on 20 May 1975 in Rome, but has been a permanent resident in Spoleto.

Laureti graduated in contemporary history at La Sapienza University, starting immediately after her activity as a radio journalist, first at ANSA and later at Radio Città Futura, becoming a professional journalist in 2006.

== Political career ==
In addition to journalistic activity, Laureti also dedicated herself to political communication as a press officer, working for the Presidency of the Lazio Region and for Luca Cordero di Montezemolo's Italia Futura association. From 2013 to 2014, she dealt with the communication of the regional councilor for work of the Lazio Region Lucia Valente, in the first council led by Nicola Zingaretti.

In 2014, the newly elected mayor of Spoleto, Fabrizio Cardarelli, appointed Laureti as the municipal councilor for culture and tourism, a position she held until Cardarelli's death in 2017, with the consequent fall of the municipal council.

On the occasion of the municipal elections of 2018, Laureti became the official candidate of the center-left coalition for the office of mayor of Spoleto, but was defeated in the ballot by the center-right candidate Umberto De Augustinis with a difference of only 86 votes.

At the next electoral round, Laureti was again elected city councilor, in support of the candidate for Andrea Sisti, who was later elected mayor.

In June 2021, Laureti was elected provincial secretary of the Democratic Party in the province of Perugia.

=== Member of the European Parliament ===
During the 2019 European Parliament election, Laureti was a candidate on the Democratic Party lists, but she was not elected, having received only 46,591 votes.

On 11 January 2022, following the death of the president of the European Parliament David Sassoli, Laureti took over as MEP.
