= Fulvio Martusciello =

Italian politician

Fulvio Martusciello MEP
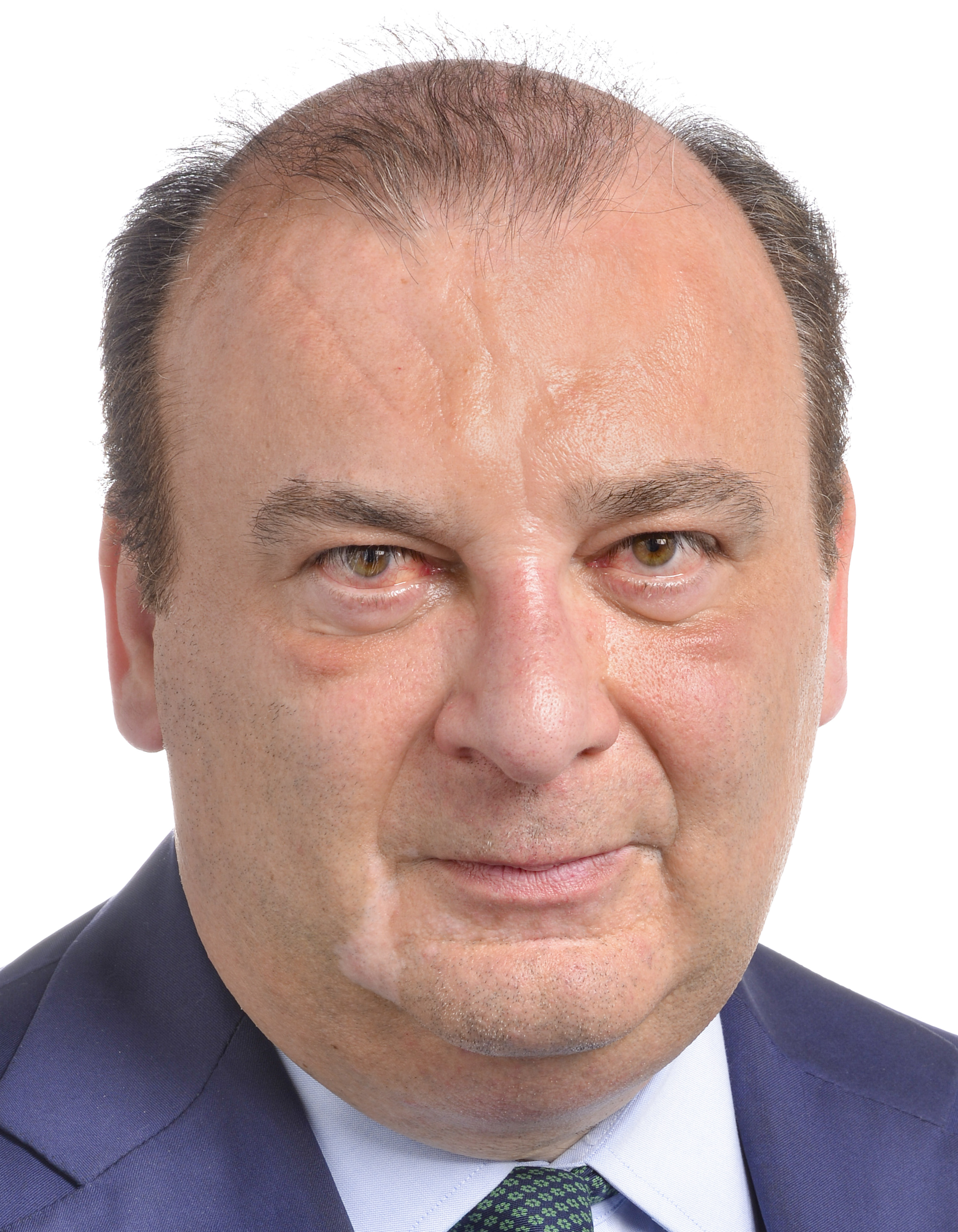

Member of the European Parliament
- Incumbent
- Assumed office 1 July 2014

Personal details
- Born: 25 May 1968 (age 58) Naples, Italy
- Party: Forza Italia
- Education: University of Naples Federico II
- Profession: Lawyer, Politician
- Website: www.fulviomartusciello.com

Fulvio Martusciello (born 25 May 1968) is an Italian politician and a member of the European Parliament since 2014.

== Biography ==
Fulvio Martusciello was born in Naples. He studied law at the University of Naples Federico II. In 1993, he received a license as a lawyer, and in the following year, he began specializing in civil law. He has been a member of the European Parliament since 2014. There, he is chairman of the delegation for relations with Israel and a member of the Conference of Delegation Presidencies, the Committee on Budgetary Control, the Committee on Economic and Monetary Affairs and the Delegation to the Parliamentary Assembly of the Union for the Mediterranean.

== Early political career ==
Approaching policy at a young age, Martusciello joined the newly formed political party, Forza Italia in 1994. Martusciello was then appointed to provincial coordinator of Benevento and held the position until 2004. During his time as provincial coordinator Martusciello also acquired the position of Regional Director of Campania in 1995, which consists of the city of Naples. He was nominated candidate of the centre-right. After the victory of Antonio Rastrelli, Martusciello entered the regional council and held the position of head deputy of Forza Italia until the elections in 1999. In 2005, Martusciello accumulated over 35,000 votes, setting a record for votes garnered in elections for the Regional Councils of Italy. In 2010, he was elected to the regional council for the fourth time. By this point, however, Forza Italy had begun a hiatus starting in 2009 (and lasting until 2013). Martusciello's fourth regional appointment was to the newly formed People of Freedom party, and he was unanimously elected president. In February 2016, Silvio Berlusconi appointed Martusciello the National Coordinator of the Defenders of Voices.

Martusciello has held office in a number of committees during his impressive 15-plus years as Regional Director of Campania. During his first term, Martusciello was President of the regional school of Municipal Police. During this period, Martusciello also functioned as a Vice President to the Regional Commission of Tourism, as well as to the Agriculture and Manufacturing Sectors. After 2000, Martusciello was elected President of the Commission to the Regional Council of Campania, and in 2005, he was elected quaestor. Starting on 20 October 2012, Martusciello acted as an Advisor to the President of the Campania Region, with the express responsibility of handling economic and developmental matters. His position as an advisor to economics and development would set the stage for his future positions in the European Parliament

In October 2012, Martusciello stepped down as President of the Campania region, passing his responsibilities to Stefano Caldoro. In the following year, Forza Italy was reborn, and Martusciello rejoined with aspirations of higher office.

== European Parliament ==
In May 2014, Martusciello ran for a seat at the European Parliament. He ran as a representative of the Southern District of Italy, where his native town of Naples is, as well as the constituency he was once President of, Campania 1. Martusciello was elected with 89,501 preferences and joined the European People's Party. In October of the same year the new MEP was elected chairman for relations with Israel. Currently Martusciello is a member of the European Parliament Committee on Budgetary Control, as well as the European Parliament Committee on Economic and Monetary Affairs.

Martusciello also holds positions with, the Conference of Delegation Chairs (CPDE), the Special Committee on advanced decisions on tax matters (TAXE), the Delegation to the Parliamentary Assembly of the Union for the Mediterranean (DMED), and acts as a substitute for his party on delegations such as the Committee on Industry, Research and Energy (ITRE), the Delegation to the EU-Kazakhstan, EU-Kyrgyzstan and EU-Uzbekistan Parliamentary Cooperation Committee, as well as relations with Tajikistan, Turkmenistan and Mongolia (DCAS).

== Controversy ==
In December 2012, Martusciello was under investigation by the prosecutor's office in Naples due to irregularities in costs to the Regional Director. In November 2014, his position was archived at the request of the prosecutor.

In July 2015, Martusciello became a suspect for making agreements with the Mafia as part of the request for the distribution of contracts for the maintenance of the water network in Campania from the farms associated with the Casalesi clan. In March 2017, the Prosecutor's Office at the Court of Naples, VIII Division, prepared the dismissal of the criminal proceedings after the prosecutor's office proved the absolute strangeness of the facts.

In 2018, Martusciello caused controversy when he joined Ryszard Czarnecki for an unauthorized trip to Bangladesh, where they met with Prime Minister Sheikh Hasina.

In March 2025, one of Martusciello's employees was arrested by way of a European arrest warrant in Naples in connection with the Belgian Huawei corruption probe. In May 2025, President of the European Parliament Roberta Metsola requested that Martusciello's parliamentary immunity be lifted with regard to a bribery investigation involving Huawei.
