= Simona Bonafé =

Italian politician and journalist (born 1973)

Simona Bonafé MEP
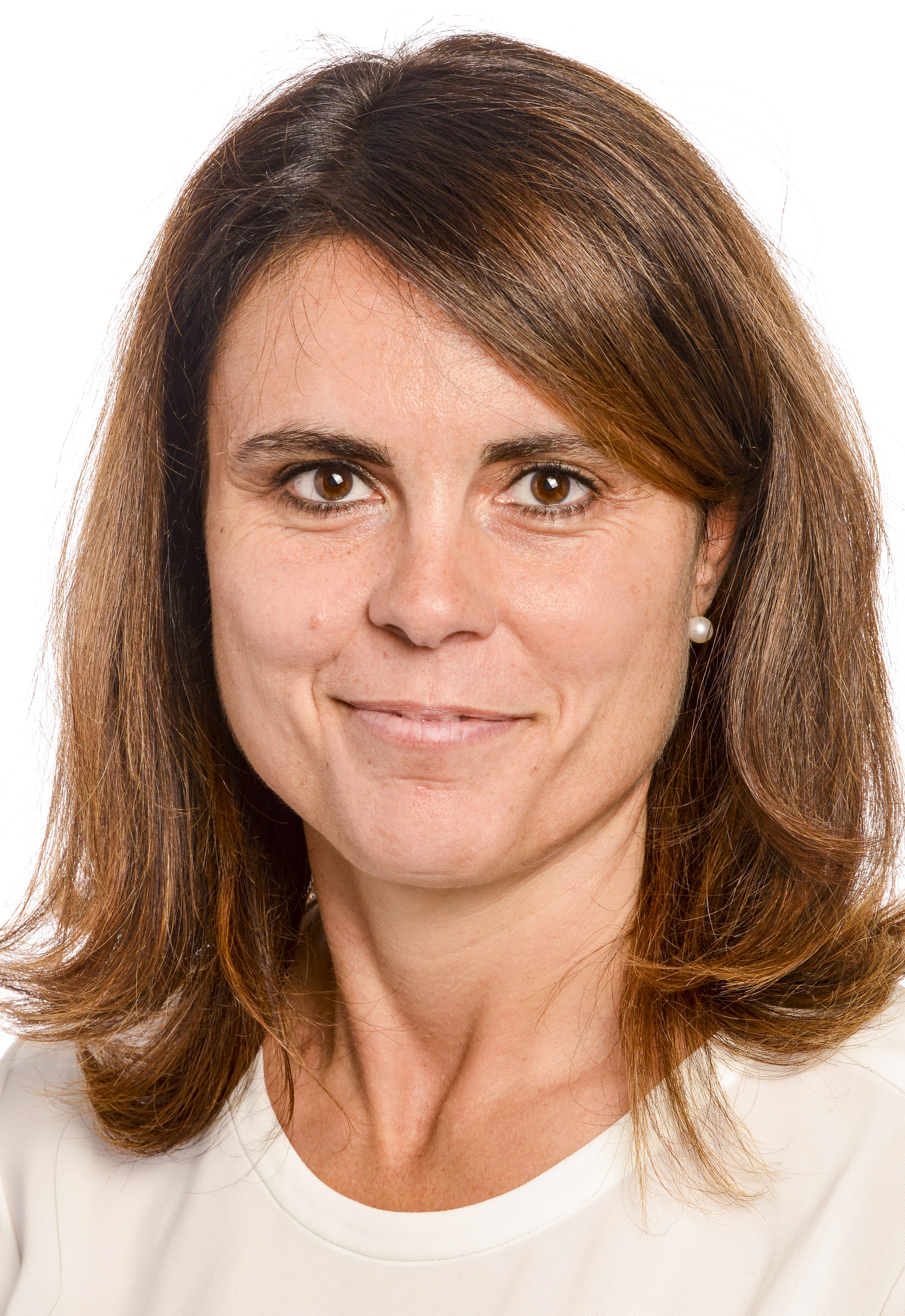

Member of the Chamber of Deputies
- Incumbent
- Assumed office 13 October 2022
- Constituency: Tuscany
- In office 15 March 2013 – 25 June 2014
- Constituency: Lombardy 2

Member of the European Parliament for Central Italy
- In office 1 July 2014 – 12 October 2022

Personal details
- Born: 24 June 1973 (age 52) Varese, Italy
- Party: DL (2002–2007); PD (since 2007)

Simona Bonafé (born 24 June 1973) is an Italian politician and journalist who is serving as a member of the country's Chamber of Deputies.

== Career ==
Born in Varese, Bonafé started her political activity in 2002 with The Daisy party. In 2004 she was appointed Councillor for the Environment in Scandicci, a role she held until 2013. From 2007, she also worked as a journalist for the newspapers Corriere di Firenze and Europa.

Bonafé was elected to the Italian parliament in 2013 with the Democratic Party, and in 2014 she was elected Member of the European Parliament (MEP) with the same party collecting over 288,000 preferences. A member of the Progressive Alliance of Socialists and Democrats group, she has since been serving on the Committee on the Environment, Public Health and Food Safety. In this capacity, she was the parliament's rapporteur on the EU Circular Economy Package and represented the Parliament at the 2016 United Nations Climate Change Conference in Marrakesh.

In addition to her committee assignments, Bonafé was a member of the parliament's delegation for relations with the People's Republic of China. She also serves as vice-chairwoman of the European Parliament Intergroup on Long Term Investment and Reindustrialisation and as member of the European Parliament Intergroup on Anti-Racism and Diversity, the European Parliament Intergroup on Integrity (Transparency, Anti-Corruption and Organized Crime) and the European Parliament Intergroup on Children's Rights.

Following the resignation of Roberto Gualtieri to return to national politics in late 2019, Bonafé was elected vice-chair of the S&D Group, under the leadership of chairwoman Iratxe García. She was elected back to the Italian parliament in 2022.
