= Andrea Caroppo (politician) =

Italian politician

Andrea Caroppo MEP
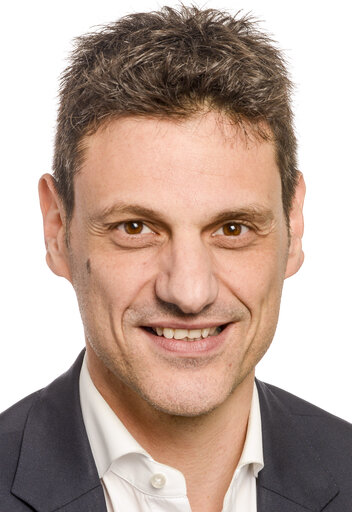

Member of the European Parliament for Southern Italy
- Incumbent
- Assumed office 2 July 2019

Personal details
- Party: South Ahead
- Education: Università Cattolica del Sacro Cuore
- Profession: Lawyer
- Website: www.andreacaroppo.it

Andrea Caroppo (born 26 June 1979 in Minervino di Lecce) is an Italian politician who was elected as a member of the European Parliament in 2019.
