= Central Italy (European Parliament constituency) =

Constituency of the European Parliament

- European Parliament constituency
- Location among the current constituencies

- Shown in Italy in red
- Member state: Italy
- Created: 1979
- MEPs: 14 (2014); 15 (2009, 2019, 2024); 16 (1989, 2004); 17 (1979, 1984); 18 (1999); 20 (1994)

Central Italy is a constituency of the European Parliament on the occasion of European elections. It consists of the Italian regions of Lazio, Marche, Tuscany, and Umbria.

As the other Italian constituencies, it has only a procedural goal to choose the elected MEPs inside party lists, the distribution of seats between different parties being calculated at national level (called Collegio Unico Nazionale, National Single Constituency).

== Background information ==
Year	Electorate	Votes	Turnout	Blank & Invalid votes	Valid votes
1979	8,225,980	7,321,736	89.01%	208,532	7,130,117
1984	8,713,067	7,506,688	86.15%	342,089	7,164,599
1989	9,008,530	7,600,174	84.37%	510,277	7,089,897
1994	9,362,767	7,190,503	76.80%	403,063	6,787,440
1999	9,484,514	6,717,785	70.83%	571,673	6,146,112
2004	9,621,843	7,160,522	74.42%	481,153	6,679,369
2009	9,743,719	6,619,218	67.93%	343,112	6,276,106
2014	9,769,495	5,954,964	60.95%	247,983	5,706,981
2019	9,781,720	5,707,334	58.35%	168,051	5,539,283
2024	9,808,951	5,071,812	51.71%	233,012	4,838,800

Source: Italian Ministry of the Interior

=== Seats by party ===
==== 1979–1994 ====
Party	1979	1984	1989
Christian Democracy (DC)	5	5	5
Italian Communist Party (PCI)	6	7	6
Italian Socialist Party (PSI)	1	2	2
Italian Liberal Party (PLI)	0	1	1
Italian Social Movement (MSI)	1	1	1
Italian Democratic Socialist Party (PSDI)	1	0	0
Italian Republican Party (PRI)	1	0	0
Radical Party (PR)	1	1	0
Proletarian Unity Party (PdUP)	1	0	0
Federation of Green Lists (FLV)			1
Total	17	17	16

==== Since 1994 ====
Party		1994	1999	2004	2009	2014	2019	2024
Forza Italia	FI	5	4	3		2	2	1
Lega Nord / Lega	LN				1	1	6	1
National Alliance	AN	3	3	2				
The People of Freedom	PdL				6			
Brothers of Italy	FdI						1	5
Democratic Party of the Left	PDS	5						
Italian People's Party	PPI	2	1					
Democrats of the Left	DS		4					
The Olive Tree				6				
Democratic Party	PD				6	7	4	5
Communist Refoundation Party	PRC	1	1	1				
Party of Italian Communists	PdCI		1	1				
Democratic Alliance	AD	1						
The Democrats	Dem		1					
Italian Democratic Socialists	SDI		1	1				
Italy of Values	IdV				1			
Federation of the Greens	FdV	1						
Greens and Left Alliance	AVS							1
Italian Radicals	RI	1	1					
Italian Republican Party	PRI	1						
Union of the Centre	UDC			1	1			
Social Alternative	AS			1				
The Other Europe with Tsipras	AET					1		
Five Star Movement	M5S					3	2	2
Total		20	17	16	15	14	15	15
Source: Italian Ministry of the Interior

== Current MEPs ==
MEPs for North-West Italy elected to the 10th European Parliament session
2024–2029
Name	Gender	National party	Group	Period	Preference vote
Giorgia Meloni	Female	Brothers of Italy	ECR	Never sworn in	616,822
Elly Schlein	Female	Democratic Party	S&D	Never sworn in	172,575
Nicola Zingaretti	Male	Democratic Party	S&D	16 July 2024 – Present	131,671
Nicola Procaccini	Male	Brothers of Italy	ECR	16 July 2024 – Present	125,423
Dario Nardella	Male	Democratic Party	S&D	16 July 2024 – Present	119,456
Roberto Vannacci	Male	Lega	P4E	Never sworn in	117,475
Matteo Ricci	Male	Democratic Party	S&D	16 July 2024 – Present	106,482
Antonio Tajani	Male	Forza Italia	EPP	Never sworn in	99,691
Camilla Laureti	Female	Democratic Party	S&D	16 July 2024 – Present	64,755
Marco Squarta	Male	Brothers of Italy	ECR	16 July 2024 – Present	54,774
Ignazio Marino	Male	Greens and Left Alliance	Greens/EFA	16 July 2024 – Present	51,184
Carlo Ciccioli	Male	Brothers of Italy	ECR	16 July 2024 – Present	51,040
Antonella Sberna	Female	Brothers of Italy	ECR	16 July 2024 – Present	49,410
Marco Tarquinio	Male	Democratic Party	S&D	16 July 2024 – Present	43,945
Francesco Torselli	Male	Brothers of Italy	ECR	16 July 2024 – Present	43,648
Salvatore De Meo	Male	Forza Italia	EPP	16 July 2024 – Present	40,822
Susanna Ceccardi	Female	Lega	P4E	16 July 2024 – Present	34,238
Carolina Morace	Female	Five Star Movement	The Left	16 July 2024 – Present	32,728
Dario Tamburrano	Male	Five Star Movement	The Left	16 July 2024 – Present	13,605

== Elections ==
=== 1979 ===
Summary of the results of Central Italy election to the European Parliament · 10 June 1979
National party	European group	Main candidate	Votes	%	Seats
Italian Communist Party (PCI)	COM	Enrico Berlinguer	2,593,454	36.37	6 / 17
Christian Democracy (DC)	EPP	Guido Gonella	2,260,718	31.71	5 / 17
Italian Socialist Party (PSI)	SOC	Mario Zagari	743,012	10.42	1 / 17
Italian Social Movement (MSI)	NI	Pino Romualdi	393,331	5.52	1 / 17
Italian Democratic Socialist Party (PSDI)	SOC	Ruggero Puletti	282,894	3.97	1 / 17
Radical Party (PR)	TGI	Marco Pannella	263,204	3.69	1 / 17
Italian Republican Party (PRI)	LD	Bruno Visentini	205,916	2.89	1 / 17
Proletarian Unity Party (PdUP)	TGI	Luciana Castellina	117,801	1.65	1 / 25
Others (parties and candidates that won less than 1% of the vote and no seats)			269,787	3.78	0 / 25
Valid votes			7,130,117		
Blank and invalid votes			208,532		
Totals			7,321,736	100.00	17 / 17
Eligible voters and turnout			8,225,980	89.01	
Source: Italian Ministry of the Interior

=== 1984 ===
Summary of the results of Central Italy election to the European Parliament · 17 June 1984
National party	European group	Main candidate	Votes	%	+/-	Seats	+/-
Italian Communist Party (PCI)	COM	Enrico Berlinguer	2,975,252	41.53	▲5.16	7 / 17	▲1
Christian Democracy (DC)	EPP	Giulio Andreotti	2,087,820	29.14	▼2.57	5 / 17	0
Italian Socialist Party (PSI)	SOC	Claudio Martelli	762,892	10.65	▲0.23	2 / 17	▲1
Italian Social Movement (MSI)	ER	Pino Romualdi	469,188	6.55	▲1.03	1 / 17	0
Liberal Party–Republican Party (PLI–PRI)	LD	Mario Di Bartolomei	362,469	5.06	▼0.46	1 / 17	0
Radical Party (PR)	NI	Enzo Tortora	213,560	2.98	▼0.71	1 / 17	0
Italian Democratic Socialist Party (PSDI)	SOC	Antonio Pala	191,902	2.68	▼1.29	0 / 17	▼1
Proletarian Democracy (DP)	RBW	Massimo Gorla	84,501	1.18	▲0.46	0 / 17	0
Others (parties and candidates that won less than 1% of the vote and no seats)			17,285	0.24	▼3.54	0 / 17	0
Valid votes			7,164,599				
Blank and invalid votes			342,089				
Totals			7,506,688	100.00	—	17 / 17	0
Eligible voters and turnout			8,713,067	86.15	▼2.86		
Source: Italian Ministry of the Interior

=== 1989 ===
Summary of the results of Central Italy election to the European Parliament · 18 June 1989
National party	European group	Main candidate	Votes	%	+/-	Seats	+/-
Italian Communist Party (PCI)	COM	Achille Occhetto	2,498,063	35.23	▼6.30	6 / 16	▼1
Christian Democracy (DC)	EPP	Arnaldo Forlani	2,089,493	29.47	▲0.33	5 / 16	0
Italian Socialist Party (PSI)	SOC	Bettino Craxi	982,	13.86	▲3.21	2 / 16	0
Italian Social Movement (MSI)	ER	Pino Rauti	443,846	6.55	▼0.29	1 / 16	0
Federation of Green Lists (FLV)	G	Gianfranco Amendola	273,919	3.86		1 / 16	
Liberal Party–Republican Party (PLI–PRI)	LD	Bruno Visentini	261,809	3.69	▼1.37	1 / 16	0
Italian Democratic Socialist Party (PSDI)	SOC	Robinio Costi	175,172	2.47	▼0.21	0 / 16	0
Rainbow Greens (VA)	G	Francesco Rutelli	173,274	2.44		0 / 16	
Antiprohibitionist List (LA)	G	Marco Taradash	89,295	1.26		0 / 16	
Proletarian Democracy (DP)	G	Eugenio Melandri	84,494	1.19	▲0.01	0 / 16	0
Others (parties and candidates that won less than 1% of the vote and no seats)			17,878	0.25	▲0.01	0 / 16	0
Valid votes			7,089,897				
Blank and invalid votes			510,277				
Totals			7,600,174	100.00	—	16 / 16	▼1
Eligible voters and turnout			9,008,530	84.37	▼1.78		
Source: Italian Ministry of the Interior

=== 1994 ===
Summary of the results of Central Italy election to the European Parliament · 12 June 1994
National party	European group	Main candidate	Votes	%	+/-	Seats	+/-
Democratic Party of the Left (PDS)	PES	Achille Occhetto	1,874,146	27.61		5 / 20	
Forza Italia (FI)	FE	Silvio Berlusconi	1,735,876	25.58		5 / 20	
National Alliance (AN)	NI	Gianfranco Fini	1,150,777	16.95		3 / 20	
Italian People's Party (PPI)	EPP	Carlo Casini	563,456	8.30		2 / 20	
Communist Refoundation Party (PRC)	EUL	Luciana Castellina	546,240	8.05		1 / 20	
Federation of the Greens (FdV)	G	Carlo Ripa di Meana	216,656	3.19		1 / 20	
Pannella List (LP)	ERA	Marco Pannella	140,980	2.08		1 / 20	
Democratic Alliance–Socialist Party (AD–PS)	PES	Riccardo Nencini	132,794	1.96		1 / 20	
Italian Republican Party (PRI)	ELDR	Giorgio La Malfa	67,426	0.99		1 / 20	
Segni Pact (PS)	EPP	Mariotto Segni	198,300	2.92		0 / 20	
Others (parties and candidates that won less than 1% of the vote and no seats)			160,689	2.37	▲2.12	0 / 20	0
Valid votes			6,787,440				
Blank and invalid votes			403,063				
Totals			7,190,503	100.00	—	20 / 20	▲4
Eligible voters and turnout			9,362767	76.80	▼5.54		
Source: Italian Ministry of the Interior

=== 1999 ===
Summary of the results of Central Italy election to the European Parliament · 13 June 1999
National party	European group	Main candidate	Votes	%	+/-	Seats	+/-
Democrats of the Left (DS)	PES	Walter Veltroni	1,508,984	24.55	▼3.06	4 / 18	▼1
Forza Italia (FI)	EPP	Silvio Berlusconi	1,238,996	20.16	▼5.42	4 / 18	▼1
National Alliance (AN)	UEN	Gianfranco Fini	948,972	15.44	▼1.51	3 / 18	0
Bonino List (LB)	TGI	Emma Bonino	463,050	7.53	▲9.61	1 / 18	0
The Democrats (Dem)	ELDR	Francesco Rutelli	380,157	6.19		1 / 18	
Communist Refoundation Party (PRC)	GUE/NGL	Fausto Bertinotti	364,970	5.94	▼2.11	1 / 18	0
Italian People's Party (PPI)	EPP	Franco Marini	234,347	3.81	▼4.49	1 / 18	0
Party of Italian Communists (PdCI)	GUE/NGL	Armando Cossutta	170,339	2.77		1 / 18	
Italian Democratic Socialists (SDI)	PES	Claudio Martelli	138,013	2.25		1 / 18	
Italian Republican Party (PRI)	ELDR	Luciana Sbarbati	47,520	0.77	▼0.22	1 / 18	0
Christian Democratic Centre (CCD)	EPP	Carlo Casini	159,004	2.59		0 / 18	
Social Movement Tricolour Flame (MSFT)	NI	Isabella Rauti	125,831	2.05		0 / 18	
Federation of the Greens (FdV)	Greens/EFA	Maria Falcone	101,387	1.65	▼1.54	0 / 18	▼1
Others (parties and candidates that won less than 1% of the vote and no seats)			264,542	4.31	▲1.94	0 / 18	0
Valid votes			6,146,112				
Blank and invalid votes			571,673				
Totals			6,717,785	100.00	—	18 / 18	▼2
Eligible voters and turnout			9,484,514	70.83	▼5.97		
Source: Italian Ministry of the Interior

=== 2004 ===
Summary of the results of Central Italy election to the European Parliament · 12–13 June 2004
National party	European group	Main candidate	Votes	%	+/-	Seats	+/-
The Olive Tree	Several (Note: The coalition was composed by Democrats of the Left (DS), Democracy is Freedom – The Daisy (DL), Italian Democratic Socialists (SDI) and European Republicans Movement (MRE), members of PES, EDP, PES and ALDE groups respectively.)	Lilli Gruber	2,393,369	35.83		6 / 16	
Forza Italia (FI)	EPP	Silvio Berlusconi	1,190,602	17.83	▼2.33	3 / 16	▼1
National Alliance (AN)	AEN	Gianfranco Fini	986,205	14.76	▼0.68	2 / 16	▼1
Communist Refoundation Party (PRC)	GUE/NGL	Fausto Bertinotti	532,859	7.98	▲2.04	1 / 16	0
Union of the Centre (UDC)	EPP	Armando Dionisi	361,936	5.42		1 / 16	
Party of Italian Communists (PdCI)	GUE/NGL	Oliviero Diliberto	223,504	3.35	▲0.58	1 / 16	0
Italian Democratic Socialists (SDI)	PES	Alessandro Battilocchio	131,790	1.97	▼0.28	1 / 16	0
Social Alternative (AS)	NI	Alessandra Mussolini	104,836	1.57		1 / 16	
Bonino List (LB)	NI	Emma Bonino	148,555	2.22	▼5.31	0 / 16	▼1
Federation of the Greens (FdV)	Greens/EFA	Alfonso Pecoraro Scanio	140,617	2.11	▲0.46	0 / 16	0
Italy of Values (IdV)	ALDE	Antonio Di Pietro	130,429	1.95		0 / 16	
Others (parties and candidates that won less than 1% of the vote and no seats)			334,667	5.02	▲0.71	0 / 16	0
Valid votes			6,679,369				
Blank and invalid votes			481,153				
Totals			7,160,522	100.00	—	16 / 16	▼2
Eligible voters and turnout			9,621,843	74.42	▲3.59		
Source: Italian Ministry of the Interior

=== 2009 ===
Summary of the results of Central Italy election to the European Parliament · 6–7 June 2009
National party	European group	Main candidate	Votes	%	+/–	Seats	+/–
The People of Freedom (PdL)	EPP	Silvio Berlusconi	2,344,306	37.35		6 / 15	
Democratic Party (PD)	S&D	David Sassoli	2,030,062	32.35		6 / 15	
Italy of Values (IdV)	ALDE	Luigi De Magistris	483,471	7.70	▲5.75	1 / 15	▲1
Union of the Centre (UDC)	EPP	Carlo Casini	341,612	5.44	▲0.02	1 / 15	0
Lega Nord (LN)	UEN	Umberto Bossi	186,988	2.98	▲2.42	1 / 15	▲1
Federation of the Left (FdS)	GUE/NGL	Oliviero Diliberto	280,063	4.46	▼6.87	0 / 15	▼1
Left and Freedom (SL)	GUE/NGL	Nichi Vendola	226,180	3.60		0 / 15	
Bonino-Pannella List (LB)	NI	Emma Bonino	171,186	2.73	▲0.51	0 / 15	0
Others (parties and candidates that won less than 1% of the vote and no seats)			212,238	3.39	–	0 / 15	0
Valid votes			6,276,106				
Blank and invalid votes			343,112				
Totals			6,619,218	100.00	—	15 / 15	▼1
Eligible voters and turnout			9,743,719	67.93	▼6.49		
Source: Italian Ministry of the Interior

=== 2014 ===
Summary of the results of Central Italy election to the European Parliament · 25 May 2014
National party	European group	Main candidate	Votes	%	+/–	Seats	+/–
Democratic Party (PD)	S&D	Simona Bonafé	2,267,892	46.57	▲14.22	7 / 14	▲1
Five Star Movement (M5S)	NI		1,243,070	21.78		3 / 14	
Forza Italia (FI)	EPP	Antonio Tajani	841,276	14.74		2 / 14	
The Other Europe with Tsipras (AET)	GUE/NGL	Barbara Spinelli	269,286	4.72		1 / 14	
Lega Nord (LN)	EFN	Matteo Salvini	122,509	2.15	▼0.83	1 / 14	0
Brothers of Italy (FdI)	ECR	Giorgia Meloni	261,216	4.58		0 / 14	
New Centre-Right (NCD)	EPP	Beatrice Lorenzin	200,117	3.51		0 / 14	
Others (parties and candidates that won less than 1% of the vote and no seats)			111,615	1.95	—	0 / 14	0
Valid votes			5,706,981				
Blank and invalid votes			247,983				
Totals			5,954,964	100.00	—	14 / 14	▼1
Eligible voters and turnout			9,769,495	60.95	▼6.98		
Source: Italian Ministry of the Interior

=== 2019 ===
Summary of the results of Central Italy election to the European Parliament · 26 May 2019
National party	European group	Main candidate	Votes	%	+/–	Seats	+/–
Lega	ID	Matteo Salvini	1,848,005	33.36	▲31.21	6 / 15	▲5
Democratic Party (PD)	S&D	Simona Bonafé	1,488,260	26.87	▼19.70	4 / 15	▼3
Five Star Movement (M5S)	NI		882,802	15.94	▼5.84	2 / 15	▼1
Brothers of Italy (FdI)	ECR	Giorgia Meloni	385,962	6.97	▲2.39	1 / 15	▲1
Forza Italia (FI)	EPP	Antonio Tajani	345,788	6.24	▼8.50	2 / 15	0
More Europe (+E)	RE	Emma Bonino	167,206	3.02		0 / 15	
The Left (LS)	GUE/NGL	Nicola Fratoianni	123,396	2.23	▼2.49	0 / 15	▼1
Green Europe (EV)	Green/EFA	Pippo Civati	120,429	2.17		0 / 15	
Others (parties and candidates that won less than 1% of the vote and no seats)			177,435	3.20	—	0 / 15	0
Valid votes			5,539,283				
Blank and invalid votes			168,051				
Totals			5,707,334	100.00	—	15 / 15	▲1
Eligible voters and turnout			9,781,720	58.35	▼2.60		
Source: Italian Ministry of the Interior

=== 2024 ===
Summary of the results of Central Italy election to the European Parliament · 8–9 June 2024
National party	European group	Main candidate	Votes	%	+/–	Seats	+/–
Brothers of Italy (FdI)	ECR	Giorgia Meloni	1,499,433	30.99	▲24.02	5 / 15	▲4
Democratic Party (PD)	S&D	Elly Schlein	1,288,280	26.62	▼0.15	5 / 15	▲1
Five Star Movement (M5S)	NI		457,820	9.46	▼6.48	2 / 15	0
Greens and Left Alliance (AVS)	The Left; Greens/EFA	Ignazio Marino	366,221	7.57	▲3.17	1 / 15	▲1
Forza Italia (FI)	EPP	Antonio Tajani	338,470	6.99	▲0.75	1 / 15	▼1
Lega	ID	Roberto Vannacci	323,258	6.68	▼26.68	1 / 15	▼5
United States of Europe (SUE)	RE	Matteo Renzi	193,565	4.00		0 / 15	
Action (A)	RE	Carlo Calenda	150,273	3.11		0 / 15	
Peace Land Dignity (PTD)	The Left	Michele Santoro	130,177	2.69		0 / 15	
Others (parties and candidates that won less than 1% of the vote and no seats)			91,303	1.88	—	0 / 15	0
Valid votes			4,838,800				
Blank and invalid votes			233,012				
Totals			5,071,812	100.00	—	15 / 15	Steady
Eligible voters and turnout			9,808,951	51.71	▼6.64		
Source: Italian Ministry of the Interior
