= 2024 European Parliament election in Italy =

- 8–9 June 2024

All 76 Italian seats to the European Parliament
- Opinion polls
- Turnout: 48.3% (▼6.2 pp)
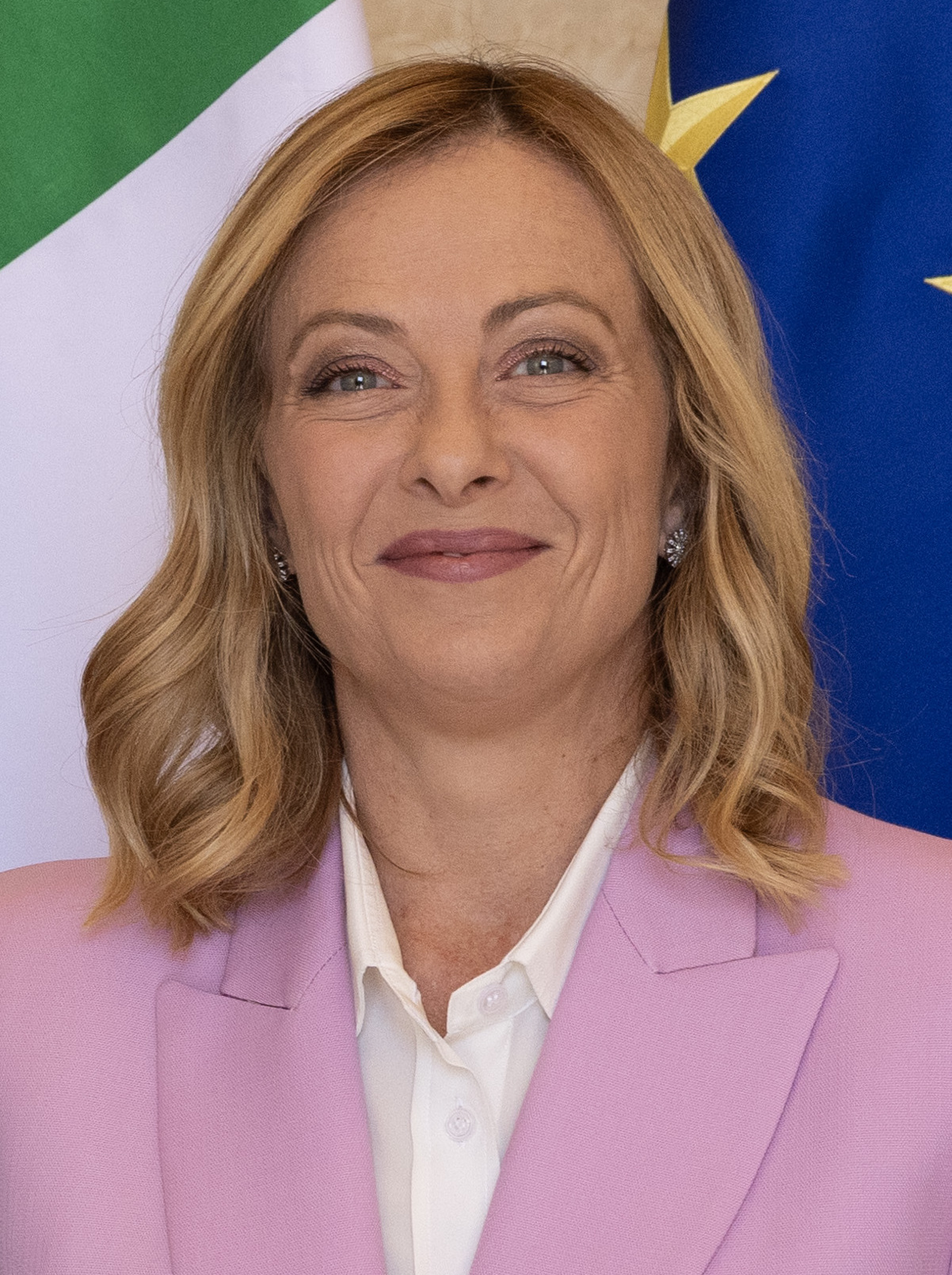

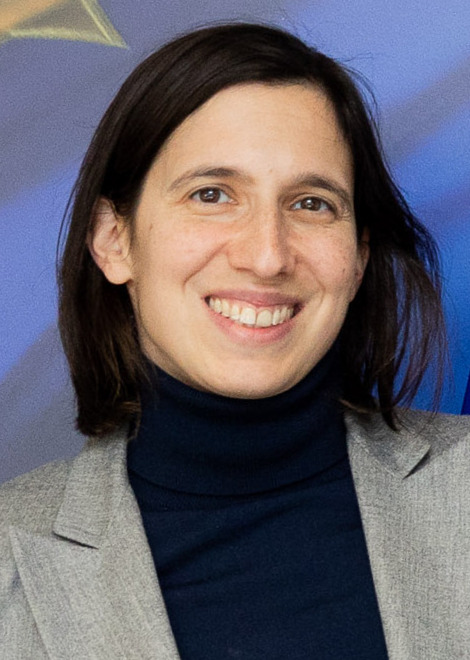

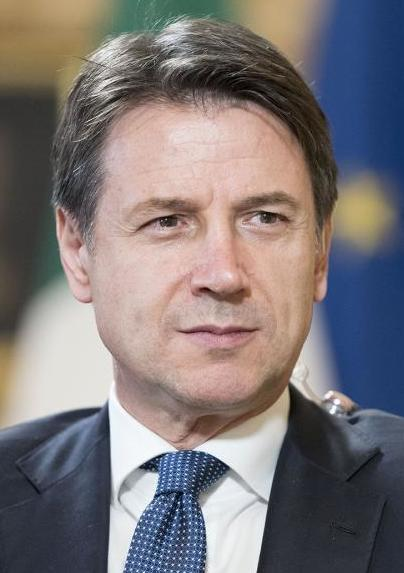

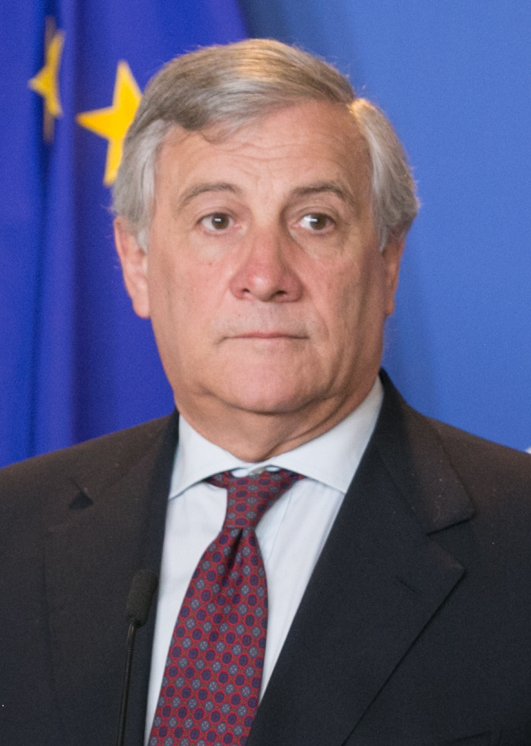

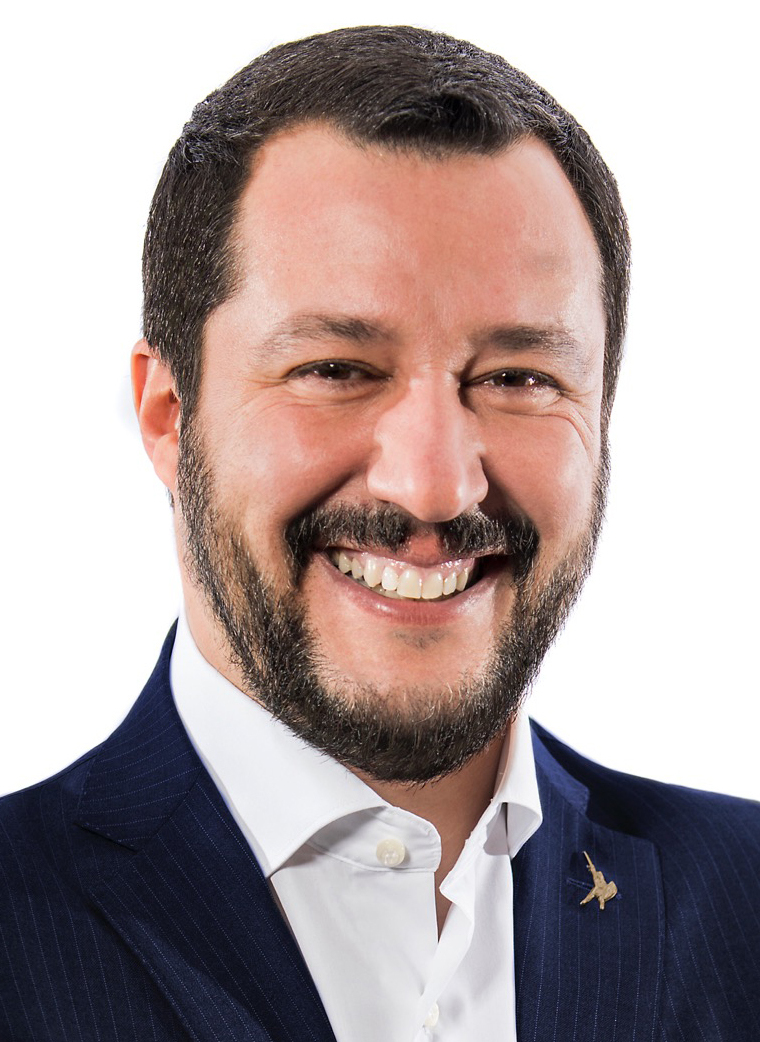

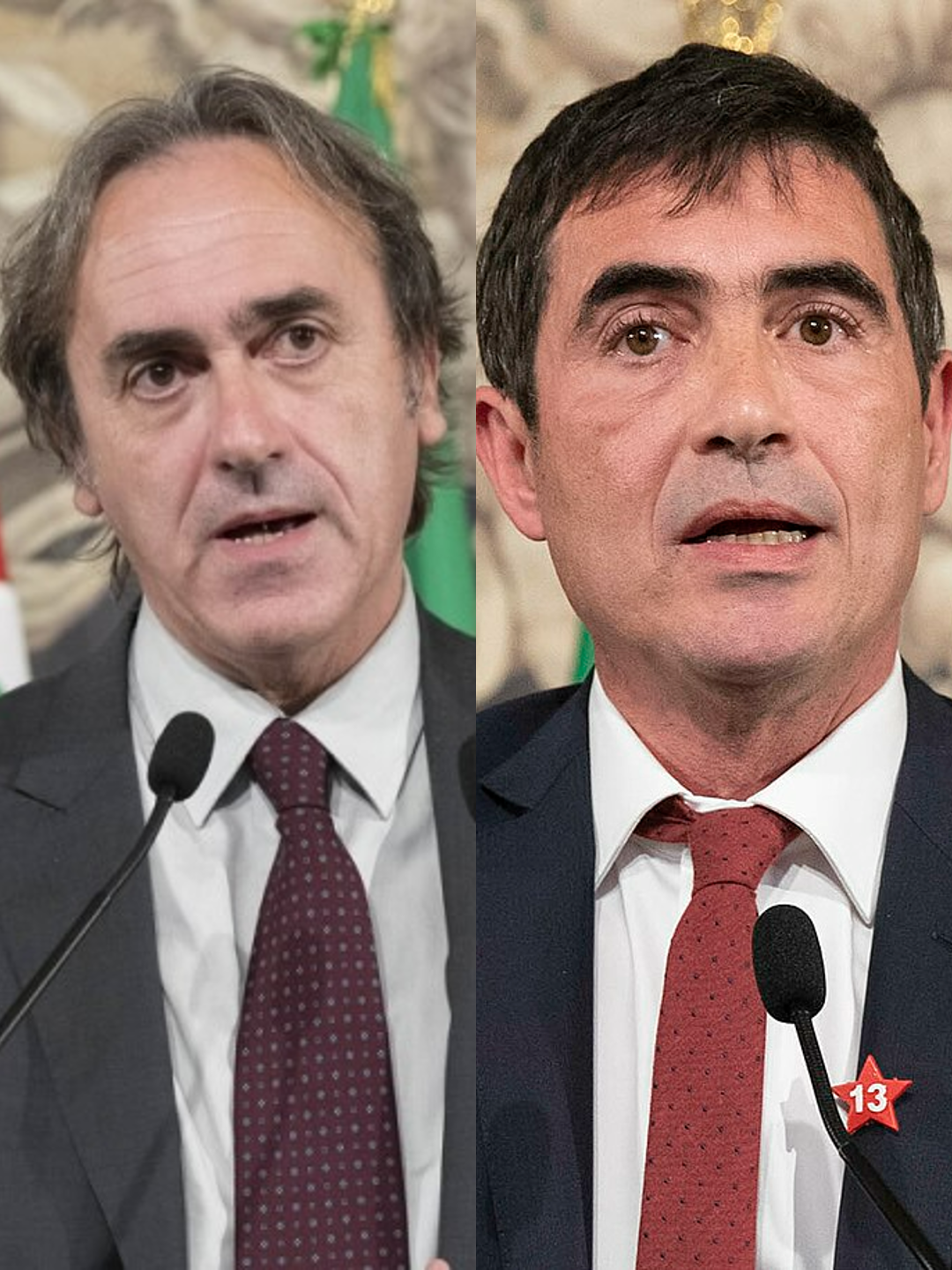
	First party	Second party	Third party
Leader	Giorgia Meloni	Elly Schlein	Giuseppe Conte
Party	Brothers of Italy	Democratic Party	Five Star Movement
Alliance	ECR	S&D	The Left
Leader since	8 March 2014	12 March 2023	6 August 2021
Last election	6.4%, 6 seats	22.7%, 19 seats	17.1%, 14 seats
Seats won	24	21	8
Seat change	▲18	▲2	▼6
Popular vote	6,732,303	5,646,296	2,336,452
Percentage	28.8%	24.1%	10.0%
Swing	▲22.4 pp	▲1.4 pp	▼7.1 pp
	Fourth party	Fifth party	Sixth party
Leader	Antonio Tajani	Matteo Salvini	Angelo Bonelli & Nicola Fratoianni
Party	Forza Italia	League	Greens and Left
Alliance	EPP	PfE	Greens/EFA; The Left
Leader since	15 July 2023	15 December 2013	2 July 2022
Last election	8.7%, 7 seats	34.3%, 29 seats	4.1%, 0 seats (Note: Results for EV (2.32%, 0 seats) and LS (1.75%, 0 seats) in the 2019 election)
Seats won	8	8	6
Seat change	▲1	▼21	▲6
Popular vote	2,244,170	2,100,292	1,588,760
Percentage	9.6%	9.0%	6.8%
Swing	▲0.9 pp	▼25.3 pp	▲2.7 pp
- Results of the election

The 2024 European Parliament election in Italy took place on 8 and 9 June 2024, electing members of the 10th Italian delegation to the European Parliament as part of the broader 2024 European Parliament election from 6 to 9 June. It was held concurrently with the 2024 Italian local elections.

== Background ==
=== Political context ===
In the 2019 European Parliament election in Italy, the right-wing populist League (Lega) of Matteo Salvini arrived first with 34.3% of the vote and 29 seats, followed by the centre-left Democratic Party (PD) with 22.7% and 19 seats. In the 2022 Italian general election, the national-conservative Brothers of Italy (FdI) of Giorgia Meloni arrived first with 25.9% of the vote for the Chamber of Deputies, inside the centre-right coalition, followed by the PD with 19.0%, inside the centre-left coalition. This resulted in the establishment of the Meloni government, which was widely described as the most right-wing since World War II and continued to lead in the opinion polling for the next Italian general election.

=== Qatargate ===
The ongoing Qatargate corruption scandal, which began in December 2022, destabilised the European Parliament following the arrest of several MEPs including Marc Tarabella, Andrea Cozzolino, and Eva Kaili. Among others, the case includes Francesco Giorgi, the parliamentary assistant of MEP Andrea Cozzolino, Antonio Panzeri, founder of the Fight Impunity non-governmental organisation (NGO); Niccolo Figa-Talamanca, head of the No Peace Without Justice NGO; and Luca Visentini, head of the International Trade Union Confederation.

=== Carlo Fidanza ===
In January 2023, MEP Carlo Fidanza of FdI was involved in a corruption investigation by the Milan Public Prosecutor's Office for having made Brescia city councillor Giovanni Acri resign in order to get Giangiacomo Calovini elected in exchange for the appointment of Acri's son as Fidanza's assistant in the European Parliament. Calovini was then elected member of the Chamber of Deputies of Italy at the 2022 general election for FdI. In June 2023, Fidanza and Calovini plea bargained with the Milan Public Prosecutor to one year and four months for corruption, avoiding the disqualification from public office that would have been triggered by the Severino Law.

== Electoral system ==
As the party-list proportional representation was the traditional electoral system of the First Italian Republic from its establishment in 1946 to 1994, it was adopted to elect the Italian members of the European Parliament (MEPs) since 1979. Two levels were introduced: a national level to divide the seats among parties and a constituency level to distribute them among candidates in open lists. Five constituencies were established, each including 2–6 Italian regions and each electing a fixed number of MEPs. At national level, seats are divided between party lists using the largest remainder method with Hare quota. Seats are allocated to parties and then to their most voted candidates. In the run-up to the 2009 European Parliament election in Italy, the Italian Parliament introduced a national electoral threshold of 4%. An exception was granted for parties representing some linguistic minorities as such lists can be connected with one of the major parties through apparentment, combining their votes, provided that those parties reach the 4% threshold and that candidates from minority parties obtain a sufficient number of votes, no less than 50,000 for the main candidate. Every political party that intends to take part in the election must collect at least 30,000 to 35,000 signatures of eligible voters for each constituency, of which at least 3,000 signatures for each region; however, the following lists are exempted from the collection of signatures: all the lists that have at least one group in the Chamber of Deputies or the Senate of the Republic, all the lists that contested themselves in the last political election with their own symbol and that have elected at least one parliamentarian, all the lists that contain the symbol of a list already exempted from the collection of signatures, and the lists that refer in the symbol to a European political party or a party of another nation within the European Union that has elected at least one MEP at the last European elections. The latter condition was established in 2019 by the Electoral Offices of the constituencies.

=== Constituencies ===
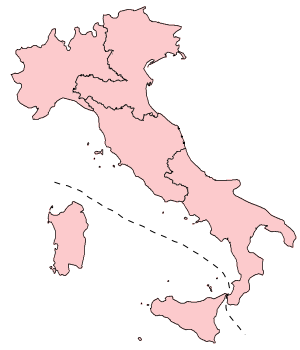
The electoral constituencies of Italy

Constituency	Regions	Seats	Population, 2022 (thousands)		Area (km^{2})	
Constituency	Regions	Seats	Total	Per seat	Total	Per seat
North-West	Aosta Valley, Liguria, Lombardy, Piedmont	20	15,832	792	57,950	2,897
North-East	Emilia-Romagna, Friuli-Venezia Giulia, Trentino-Alto Adige/Südtirol, Veneto	15	11,541	769	62,310	4,154
Central	Lazio, Marche, Tuscany, Umbria	15	11,724	781	58,052	3,870
Southern	Abruzzo, Apulia, Basilicata, Calabria, Campania, Molise	18	13,512	751	73,223	4,068
Islands	Sardinia, Sicily	8	6,421	803	49,801	6,225
Total		76	59,030	777	302,068	3,975

=== Proposed changes ===
In 2023, the Regional Council of Sardinia unanimously approved a proposal to split the Italian Islands constituency into Sicily and Sardinia due to the population disproportion between the two Italian regions. As of May 2023, the proposal is under discussion in the Senate of the Republic. In July 2023, it was informally proposed to lower the electoral threshold from 4% to 3%, the same electoral threshold used for the political elections. This proposal was welcomed by Greens and Left Alliance (AVS) and Us Moderates (NM). FdI did not shut it down since they wanted to help FI, whose future seemed uncertain after the death of Berlusconi, while Lega and IV declared themselves against the proposal. The proposal was officially rejected in September when Forza Italia, fearing the centrist competition of Az and IV, refused to lower the electoral threshold.

=== Signature exemptions ===
According to the regulations for the 2019 European Parliament election, parties may be exempted from collecting signatures under certain circumstances, including having their own group in the Chamber of Deputies or the Senate of the Republic, having elected at least one MP with their symbol in the last general election, having a logo that contains the logo of another party already exempted from collecting signatures, and having lists that refer to a European party or a party of another nation within the European Union that has elected at least one MEP in the last European elections. In 2014, the Electoral Offices of the constituencies granted exemption to the European Greens – Green Italia list, as the list was affiliated with a European political party represented in the European Parliament with its own parliamentary group. In 2019, the Electoral Offices of the constituencies established a condition that permits certain parties to participate in European elections through any party in Europe that elected at least one MEP in any European country.

In February 2024, FdI proposed an amendment to the Elections Decree in the Senate of the Republic. The amendment aimed to clarify the interpretation given by the Electoral Offices of the constituencies in 2019. It was suggested that parties that had elected at least one MEP in Italy at the last elections would be exempt. Additionally, it was proposed that only lists that had elected at least one member of the Italian Parliament (MP) in the proportional representation system (Italian electoral law of 2017) at the 2022 general election would be exempt. This exclusion would apply to parties that had elected an MP in a single-member constituency (Italian: collegio uninominale) with their party logo. After criticism from some parties, such as +Eu, South calls North (ScN), and Popular Alternative (AP), with the first two parties having elected an MP only in a single-member constituency, the amendment was revised to provide an exemption for all parties that have elected an MP, whether in a proportional representation or a single-member constituency. On 7 March 2024, the Constitutional Affairs Committee in the Senate of the Republic approved the amendment.

== Outgoing delegation ==
=== Outgoing MEPs ===
The table shows the detailed composition of the Italian seats at the European Parliament as of 1 February 2024.

EP Group	Seats	Party	Seats	MEPs
Identity and Democracy	22 / 76	League	22	Matteo Adinolfi; Alessandra Basso; Cinzia Bonfrisco; Paolo Borchia; Marco Campomenosi; Massimo Casanova; Susanna Ceccardi; Angelo Ciocca; Rosanna Conte; Gianantonio Da Re; Gianna Gancia; Paola Ghidoni; Valentino Grant; Danilo Lancini; Elena Lizzi; Alessandro Panza; Aldo Patriciello; Antonio Maria Rinaldi; Silvia Sardone; Annalisa Tardino; Isabella Tovaglieri; Marco Zanni
Progressive Alliance of Socialists and Democrats	15 / 76	Democratic Party	14	Brando Benifei; Mercedes Bresso; Beatrice Covassi; Paolo De Castro; Elisabetta Gualmini; Camilla Laureti; Alessandra Moretti; Pina Picierno; Franco Roberti; Daniela Rondinelli; Irene Tinagli; Patrizia Toia; Achille Variati
Progressive Alliance of Socialists and Democrats	15 / 76	Solidary Democracy	1	Pietro Bartolo
Progressive Alliance of Socialists and Democrats	15 / 76	Independents	1	Giuliano Pisapia
European People's Party	12 / 76	Forza Italia	11	Isabella Adinolfi; Caterina Chinnici; Lara Comi; Matteo Gazzini; Salvatore De Meo; Fulvio Martusciello; Alessandra Mussolini; Francesca Peppucci; Massimiliano Salini; Lucia Vuolo; Stefania Zambelli
European People's Party	12 / 76	South Tyrolean People's Party	1	Herbert Dorfmann
European Conservatives and Reformists	10 / 76	Brothers of Italy	9	Sergio Berlato; Elisabetta De Blasis; Carlo Fidanza; Pietro Fiocchi; Chiara Maria Gemma; Giuseppe Milazzo; Denis Nesci; Nicola Procaccini; Vincenzo Sofo
European Conservatives and Reformists	10 / 76	League	1	Raffaele Stancanelli (Note: Raffaele Stancanelli, an outgoing MEP of Brothers of Italy, was a candidate for the League.)
Renew Europe	4 / 76	Action	2	Fabio Massimo Castaldo; Giuseppe Ferrandino
Renew Europe	4 / 76	Italia Viva	1	Nicola Danti
Renew Europe	4 / 76	Independents	1	Marco Zullo
Greens–European Free Alliance	3 / 76	Greens and Left Alliance	1	Rosa D'Amato
Greens–European Free Alliance	3 / 76	August 24th Movement	1	Piernicola Pedicini
Greens–European Free Alliance	3 / 76	Independents	1	Ignazio Corrao
Non-attached members	10 / 76	Five Star Movement	5	Tiziana Beghin; Maria Angela Danzì; Laura Ferrara; Mario Furore; Sabrina Pignedoli
Non-attached members	10 / 76	Brothers of Italy	1	Maria Veronica Rossi (Note: Maria Veronica Rossi left the League and joined Brothers of Italy on 30 April 2024.)
Non-attached members	10 / 76	Democratic Party	1	Andrea Cozzolino (Note: Andrea Cozzolino was suspended from the Democratic Party on 16 December 2022 following the Qatar corruption scandal at the European Parliament.)
Non-attached members	10 / 76	Greens and Left Alliance	1	Massimiliano Smeriglio
Non-attached members	10 / 76	Christian Democracy Sicily	1	Francesca Donato
Non-attached members	10 / 76	Independents	1	Dino Giarrusso
Total			76	
Source: European Parliament

=== Retiring incumbents ===
The table shows the MEPs who did not seek re-election.

Constituency	Departing MEP	Party	EP Group	First elected	Terms	Date announced
North-West Italy	Mercedes Bresso	Democratic Party	S&D	2004	3	22 May 2023
North-East Italy	Achille Variati	Democratic Party	S&D	2022	1	19 January 2024
North-West Italy	Marco Zanni	League	ID	2014	2	28 February 2024
Southern Italy	Laura Ferrara	Five Star Movement	NI	2014	2	15 March 2024
Italian Islands	Ignazio Corrao	Independent	Greens/EFA	2014	2	9 April 2024
North-West Italy	Lara Comi	Forza Italia	EPP	2009	3	17 April 2024
North-East Italy	Paolo De Castro	Democratic Party	S&D	2009	3	20 April 2024
North-East Italy	Gianantonio Da Re	League	ID	2019	1	23 April 2024
Central Italy	Matteo Adinolfi	League	ID	2019	1	23 April 2024
Central Italy	Nicola Danti	Italia Viva	RE	2014	2	1 May 2024
Southern Italy	Massimo Casanova	League	ID	2019	1	2 May 2024
North-West Italy	Marco Campomenosi	League	ID	2019	1	
Central Italy	Antonio Maria Rinaldi	League	ID	2019	1	
Italian Islands	Francesca Donato	Christian Democracy	NI	2019	1	
North-West Italy	Giuliano Pisapia	Independent	S&D	2019	1	
Southern Italy	Franco Roberti	Democratic Party	S&D	2019	1	
Southern Italy	Andrea Cozzolino	Democratic Party	NI	2009	3	
North-West Italy	Tiziana Beghin	Five Star Movement	NI	2014	2	
North-East Italy	Marco Zullo	Independent	RE	2014	2	
North-East Italy	Fabio Massimo Castaldo	Action	RE	2014	2	
Italian Islands	Dino Giarrusso	Independent	NI	2019	1	
North-East Italy	Paola Ghidoni	League	ID	2022	1	
Southern Italy	Elisabetta De Blasis	Brothers of Italy	ECR	2022	1	

== Parties and leaders ==
This is a list of the parties that took part to the election. Some parties ran only in one or a few constituencies out of five.

Party		Main ideology	Leader(s)	European party	2019 result		Outgoing MEPs
Party		Main ideology	Leader(s)	European party	Votes (%)	Seats	Outgoing MEPs
Lega	League Lega: Union of the Centre (UdC); Italian Liberal Party (PLI); Italian Liberal Right (DLI); Sardinian Action Party (PSdAz); Protagonist South (SP); Italy of the South (IdM)	Right-wing populism	Matteo Salvini	ID	34.3%	29 / 76	23 / 76
PD	Democratic Party Partito Democratico: Solidary Democracy (DemoS); Volt Italy	Social democracy	Elly Schlein	PES	22.7%	19 / 76	15 / 76
M5S	Five Star Movement Movimento 5 Stelle: Democratic Area – Autonomist Left (ADGA)	Populism	Giuseppe Conte	None	17.1%	14 / 76	5 / 76
FI–NM	Forza Italia–Us Moderates Forza Italia–Noi Moderati: Coraggio Italia (CI); Sardinian Reformers (RS); Movement for Autonomy (MpA); Future Sicily (SF); Christian Democracy (DC); New Times – United Populars (TN–UP); Transnational Radical Party (PRNTT)	Liberal conservatism	Antonio Tajani	EPP	8.8%	7 / 76	10 / 76
FdI	Brothers of Italy Fratelli d'Italia: Renaissance (R); New Italian Socialist Party (NPSI); Christian Democracy with Rotondi (DCR)	National conservatism	Giorgia Meloni	ECR	6.4%	6 / 76	10 / 76
SVP	South Tyrolean People's Party Südtiroler Volkspartei: Trentino Tyrolean Autonomist Party (PATT); Belluno Autonomous Region Dolomites Movement (BARD); Slovene Union (SSk); The Civic List (LC)	Regionalism	Dieter Steger	EPP	0.5%	1 / 76	1 / 76
AVS	Greens and Left Alliance Alleanza Verdi e Sinistra: Green Europe (EV); Italian Left (SI); Greens (VGV); Progressive Party (PP); Environment Rights Equality (ADU); Civic Network (RC); Party of the South (PdS); Power to the People (PaP) – individual candidate	Green politics Democratic socialism	Angelo Bonelli; Nicola Fratoianni	EGP; PEL	2.3% 1.7%	0 / 76	1 / 76
SUE	United States of Europe Stati Uniti d'Europa: More Europe (+E); Italia Viva (IV); Italian Socialist Party (PSI); Italian Radicals (RI); European Liberal Democrats (LDE); L'Italia c'è (LIC); Us of the Centre (NdC); Social Democracy (SD); Federation of European Civics (FCE); Actionist Renaissance (RA) – split from Action	European federalism	Emma Bonino; Matteo Renzi	ALDE; EDP; PES	3.1%	0 / 76	1 / 76
PAI	Animalist Party–Italexit; Partito Animalista–Italexit	Animal rights	Cristiano Ceriello	APEU	0.6%	0 / 76	0 / 76
AP	Popular Alternative; Alternativa Popolare	Conservatism	Stefano Bandecchi	EPP	0.4%	0 / 76	0 / 76
A	Action Azione: Populars Europeanists Reformers (PER); Italian Republican Party (PRI); NOS; Liberal Socialist Association (ASL); Italian Democratic Socialist Party (PSDI); European Republicans Movement (MRE); Team K (TK); Autonomy House (CA); Popular Civic Reformer Platform (PCPR); Liberal Democracy (DL); United Romagna (RU)	Liberalism	Carlo Calenda	ALDE	Did not contest		2 / 76
PTD	Peace Land Dignity Pace Terra Dignità: Communist Refoundation Party (PRC); MERA25 Italia (MERA25); Territorial Equity Movement (MET); Liberu	Left-wing populism	Michele Santoro	PEL	Did not contest		1 / 76
L	Freedom Libertà: South calls North (ScN); The People of the Family (PdF); Vita; Great North (GN); Sicilia Vera (SV); Shared Horizon (OC); Green Front (FV); Movement for Italexit (MpI); Venetian People (PV); Civics in Movement (CiM); Pensioners' Party + Health (PP+S); Moderate Party of Italy (PMDI); Us Farmers & Fishers (NA&P); Free Together (IL); Sustainable Progress (PS); Sovereignty	Populism	Cateno De Luca	None	Did not contest		0 / 76
DSP	Sovereign Popular Democracy Democrazia Sovrana Popolare: Communist Party (PC); Sovereign and Popular Italy Again (AISP)	Anti-establishment	Marco Rizzo	None	Did not contest		0 / 76
RV	Valdostan Rally Rassemblement Valdôtain: Piedmont Project Movement (MPP)	Regionalism	Stefano Aggravi	None	Did not contest		0 / 76

== Candidates ==
=== Top candidates ===
The following table lists the top candidates of each party/list in the five constituencies.

Party	North-West	North-East	Centre	South	Islands	Source
League	Silvia Sardone	Paolo Borchia	Roberto Vannacci	Roberto Vannacci	Annalisa Tardino	
Democratic Party	Cecilia Strada	Stefano Bonaccini	Elly Schlein	Lucia Annunziata	Elly Schlein	
Five Star Movement	Maria Angela Danzì	Sabrina Pignedoli	Carolina Morace	Pasquale Tridico	Giuseppe Antoci	
Forza Italia–Us Moderates	Antonio Tajani	Antonio Tajani	Antonio Tajani	Antonio Tajani	Caterina Chinnici	
Brothers of Italy	Giorgia Meloni	Giorgia Meloni	Giorgia Meloni	Giorgia Meloni	Giorgia Meloni	
Greens and Left Alliance	Ilaria Salis	Cristina Guarda	Ignazio Marino	Mimmo Lucano	Leoluca Orlando	
United States of Europe	Emma Bonino	Graham Watson	Gian Domenico Caiazza	Enzo Maraio	Rita Bernardini	
Action	Elena Bonetti	Carlo Calenda	Carlo Calenda	Carlo Calenda	Carlo Calenda	
Peace Land Dignity	Michele Santoro	Raniero La Valle	Michele Santoro	Michele Santoro	Michele Santoro	
Freedom	Cateno De Luca	Cateno De Luca	Cateno De Luca	Cateno De Luca	Cateno De Luca	
Popular Alternative	Stefano Bandecchi	Stefano Bandecchi	Luca Palamara	Stefano Bandecchi	Stefano Bandecchi	
Sovereign Popular Democracy	—N/a	—N/a	Marco Rizzo	—N/a	—N/a	
Animalist Party–Italexit	—N/a	—N/a	—N/a	Cristiano Ceriello	—N/a	
South Tyrolean People's Party	—N/a	Herbert Dorfmann	—N/a	—N/a	—N/a	
Valdostan Rally	Stefano Aggravi	—N/a	—N/a	—N/a	—N/a	

=== League ===
On 8 January 2024, Salvini announced that he would not run for the next European Parliament. He also praised Roberto Vannacci, an Italian Army general who became notorious in the summer of 2023 for writing a political book containing statements considered homophobic, racist, and sexist by some while on duty. An internal disciplinary procedure was opened against him by the Italian Army to investigate possible disciplinary offences. Vannacci said he would consider a candidature for the European elections. On 25 April, Salvini announced that Vannacci accepted to run as a candidate in all constituencies.

=== Democratic Party ===
Paolo Gentiloni, the outgoing European Commissioner for Economy, turned down the chance to stand as a candidate for the European Parliament.

=== Brothers of Italy ===
Meloni, the leader of FdI and 68th Prime Minister of Italy, said during a press conference that she was considering running in the election. According to Article 122 of the Italian Constitution and to Article 6 of the Access Initial Legal Act approved by the European Parliament, the office of Prime Minister is incompatible with that of MEP, therefore Meloni should immediately resign as MEP. Berlusconi was the only italian incumbent Prime Minister to run as a candidate for the European elections in 1994, 2004, and 2009, resigning as MEP after the elections due to incompatibility with the office of Prime Minister.

=== Other parties ===
On 14 January 2024, Emma Bonino declined to stand as a candidate for the election; she changed her mind on 20 April 2024. On 25 January 2024, Federico Pizzarotti, president of +Eu, announced his desire to run as a candidate. On 22 January 2024, Calenda unveiled on the party website the first candidates for the election: MEP Giosi Ferrandino, Caterina Avanza, Alessio D'Amato, Cristina Lodi, Mario Raffaelli, and Giuseppe Zollino.

== Campaign ==
=== League ===
Lega leader Matteo Salvini repeatedly called for the formation of an alternative majority in the European Parliament that included the groups of the European People's Party (EPP), European Conservatives and Reformists (ECR), and Identity and Democracy Party (ID), like the centre-right coalition that won the 2022 Italian general election. on 7 December 2023, Salvini organised an ID convention in Florence, where he criticised the European Green Deal, accusing the Progressive Alliance of Socialists and Democrats (S&D) of "illegally occupying" the European Commission. For his part, Antonio Tajani, the new leader of Forza Italia (FI) following the death of historic party leader Silvio Berlusconi in June 2023, criticised Salvini's idea, not considering an alliance with Marine Le Pen of the National Rally (RN), Geert Wilders of the Party for Freedom (PVV), and Alternative for Germany (AfD) possible.

=== Brothers of Italy ===
In an interview with ZDF on 6 August 2023, the EPP president Manfred Weber praised the Meloni government, suggesting a possible alliance with FdI for the next election. He drew a red line with three conditions to fulfill: the support for Ukraine in the Russo-Ukrainian War, the willingness to build Europe and not destroy it, and the acceptance of the rule of law, denying at the same time an alliance with AfD, RN, or PiS; at the same time, Markus Söder, the Christian Social Union in Bavaria (CSU) leader, turned down any alliance with FdI. Former German Minister of Justice Katarina Barley accused Weber of opening up to the far right in Europe. During the press conference held on 5 January 2024, Meloni said there are "insurmountable distances" with AfD but praised Le Pen.

=== Centrist parties ===
After the break-up of the Third Pole, an electoral coalition formed in 2022 between Action (Az) and Italia Viva (IV), there were concerns that there was a risk of presenting three lists belonging to the same Renew Europe (Renew) group without any of the three lists being able to pass the threshold, thus not electing any MEPs. Stéphane Séjourné, the president of Renew, publicly appealed in May 2023 to both parties to stand together at the next European elections so as to elect "as many MEPs from the Renew Europe group as possible". Disagreements between Az leader Carlo Calenda and IV leader Matteo Renzi hindered the birth of a common list; Renzi announced the break-up of the common groups at the Italian Parliament and the birth of a list called The Centre, while Calenda expressed his opposition to run again with Renzi. Calenda had also broken the federation with More Europe (+Eu) in August 2022, preferring to ally himself with IV to create the Third Pole, and he had also stood as a candidate in the same constituency as +Eu founder Emma Bonino, ending up favouring the centre-right coalition candidate who then won the single-member constituency.

On 30 September 2023, Riccardo Magi, the secretary of +Eu, announced that his party would run as United States of Europe. On 13 December 2023, the National Direction of +Eu approved talks with the other Italian liberal parties for a list supporting a federal Europe. On 15 December 2023, Bonino published on La Stampa a manifesto, calling for the United States of Europe. The manifesto was signed by individual people like Base Italia leader Marco Bentivogli, Giusi Nicolini, Sandro Gozi, Nathalie Tocci, and Renato Soru, and parties like IV.

On 31 January 2024, Bonino published an article in Il Sole 24 Ore announcing a convention for the United States of Europe list open to all parties for 24 February 2024 in Rome. The goal was to launch a list that did not contain individual party symbols on its logo and that party leaders would not run for the European Parliament election. Despite supporting the manifesto, Renzi announced that he would run in all constituencies. Following the convention on 24 February 2024, there were differences of opinion between Az and IV. Magi requested a brief period of reflection to come to an agreement on a single list. On 7 March 2024, +Eu issued a statement advocating for a unified list that includes all three liberal parties, otherwise each party would need to act independently.

=== Other lists ===
In November 2023, former Rome mayor Gianni Alemanno launched a right-wing party called Independence, saying he was thinking about running for the European Parliament election. In February 2024, television host Michele Santoro presented a left-wing list named Peace, Land, Dignity.

== Opinion polling ==
=== Party vote ===
Exit poll

Fieldwork date	Polling firm	Sample size	Lega ID	PD S&D	M5S NI	FI EPP	NM EPP	FdI ECR	AVS Left–G/EFA	PTD (Note: Polls before 12 March 2024 referred to it as the People's Union (UP).) Left	SUE		A Renew	DSP NI	Italexit NI	Libertà NI	Others	Lead
Fieldwork date	Polling firm	Sample size	Lega ID	PD S&D	M5S NI	FI EPP	NM EPP	FdI ECR	AVS Left–G/EFA	PTD Left	+E Renew	IV Renew	A Renew	DSP NI	Italexit NI	Libertà NI	Others	Lead
8–9 Jun 2024	Consorzio Opinio	–	8–10	21–25	10–14	8.5–10.5		26–30	5–7	1–3	3.5–5.5		2.5–4.5	–	–	0–2	0–3	9–1
20–24 May 2024	SWG	2,000	8.6	22.0	14.7	8.6		27.3	4.6	2.5	4.2		4.0			2.0		5.3
25–25 May 2024	Noto	1,000	9.0	20.5	15.0	9.0		28.0	4.0	2.2	4.0		4.0			3.0		7.5
22–23 May 2024	Demopolis	2,000	8.8	22.0	14.5	8.7		27.0	4.3	2.2	4.2		3.7			2.8		5.0
21–22 May 2024	Eumetra	800	8.7	21.1	16.2	8.9		27.1	4.2	2.2	4.5		3.8			2.0		6.0
22–23 May 2024	Termometro	3,900	9.0	19.6	15.7	8.5		26.8	4.0	2.5	4.5		3.9			1.8	1.0	7.2
19–23 May 2024	Quorum	1,604	9.0	20.3	15.9	8.5		27.2	4.9	1.9	4.1		3.9			0.9	0.5	6.9
19–23 May 2024	EMG	2,000	9.3	20.9	15.7	7.9		26.9	4.2		4.5		3.7					6.0
20–21 May 2024	Ipsos	1,000	8.6	22.5	15.4	9.2		26.5	4.6	1.9	4.1		3.6			2.0	0.7	4.0
19–21 May 2024	Cluster 17	1,051	8.7	20.8	15.5	8.2		26.9	4.3	2.2	4.6		3.7	1.0		2.2	1.9	7.1
20–21 May 2024	Bidimedia	1,190	9.1	21.2	15.2	8.3		27.1	4.4	2.0	4.6		4.0			2.5	1.6	6.0
17–22 Apr 2024	SWG	1,200	8.5	20.0	15.9	8.4		26.8	4.3	2.1	4.7		4.1	1.4		2.2	1.6	6.8
17–19 Apr 2024	Quorum	801	7.2	20.5	16.5	7.6		27.8	4.4	1.9	5.0		3.3			1.6	4.2	7.3
17–18 Apr 2024	Demos	1,005	8.5	20.2	16.4	8.0		28.0	4.2		4.1		4.0				6.6	7.8
16–18 Apr 2024	Termometro Politico	4,100	8.5	19.7	16.1	8.3		27.5	3.2	2.5	5.2		3.8	1.9		1.6	1.7	7.8
16–17 Apr 2024	Eumetra		8.5	19.7	16.4	8.3		27.4	3.8	1.9	5.1		3.8	1.3		1.9	2.0	7.7
10–15 Apr 2024	SWG	1,200	8.6	19.4	16.0	8.4		27.2	4.1	1.8	5.2		4.2	1.4		1.9	1.8	7.8
13 Apr 2024	Tecnè		7.9	19.8	16.2	10.1		27.3	3.7	1.6	5.5		3.6			2.0	2.3	7.5
8–12 Apr 2024	Ixè	1,000	8.0	19.9	16.4	8.4		26.6	4.2	1.1	4.0		3.7			1.3	6.4	6.7
9–11 Apr 2024	Termometro Politico	3,700	8.8	19.5	15.6	8.0		27.8	3.3	2.4	5.1		3.9	1.8		1.8	2.4	8.3
8–9 Apr 2024	Demopolis	2,000	8.0	20.0	15.8	8.7		27.0	3.8	2.2	4.6		3.5			2.1	2.0	7.0
3–8 Apr 2024	SWG	1,200	8.8	19.8	15.6	7.8		26.9	3.9	1.6	5.3		4.0	1.4		1.5	3.4	7.1
8 Apr 2024	Euromedia	800	8.7	19.7	17.6	8.5		26.9	3.7	1.8	4.4		3.8			3.7	1.2	7.2
5 Apr 2024	EMG	–	7.8	20.2	16.7	9.0	1.0	27.2	3.3	1.2	6.2		3.2				4.2	7.0
4–5 Apr 2024	Quorum	801	7.5	19.8	16.0	7.8		27.7	3.9	2.2	4.6		3.1			1.6	4.7	7.9
2–4 Apr 2024	EMG	1,000	7.8	20.2	16.7	9.0		27.2	3.3	1.2	6.2		3.2				5.2	7.0
28–30 Mar 2024	BiDiMedia	2,000	8.3	20.2	16.6	7.1		27.1	4.4	1.5	5.1		4.4	1.3		1.1	2.7	6.9
27 Mar 2024	Euromedia	800	8.8	19.3	17.5	8.0	0.7	27.5	3.5	2.0	4.7		4.0			1.7	2.3	8.2 (Note: Without leaders)
27 Mar 2024	Euromedia	800	8.7	19.5	17.5	8.3	0.6	27.9	3.0	2.0	4.8		4.1			1.7	1.9	8.5 (Note: With leaders)
19–25 Mar 2024	Ipsos	1,000	8.0	20.5	16.1	8.7	0.7	27.5	3.3	1.5	2.8	3.3	2.5	1.2	1.5		2.4	7.0
20 Mar 2024	Ipsos	–	8.2	19.0	17.4	8.2		27.0	4.1		2.6	3.4	3.0				7.1	8.0
19 Mar 2024	Noto	–	8.0	19.0	17.0	8.0	2.0	28.0	3.5		2.5	3.0	3.5				5.5	9.0
19 Mar 2024	Noto	–	7.0	20.0	16.0	8.0	2.0	30.0	3.0		2.5	3.0	3.5				5.0	10.0
11 Mar 2024	Euromedia	800	8.7	19.7	17.2	7.7	0.7	28.0	3.9		2.7	3.5	4.0				4.0	8.3
11 Mar 2024	Euromedia	800	8.6	20.2	16.9	8.2	0.4	28.7	3.4		1.5			3.8	4.0		3.3	8.5
7 Mar 2024	Noto	–	8.0	19.5	16.5	7.5	2.0	27.0	4.0		3.5	3.0	3.5				5.5	7.5
7 Mar 2024	Noto	–	7.5	20.5	16.5	8.0	1.5	29.0	3.5		3.5	3.0	3.0				4.0	8.5
23 Feb – 5 Mar 2024	Ipsos	1,503	8.2	19.0	17.4	8.2		27.0	4.1		2.6	3.4	3.0				7.1	8.0
28 Feb – 1 Mar 2024	Quorum	803	8.1	19.9	15.9	6.6	0.7	27.1	4.6		3.4	3.5	3.7		1.6		4.9	7.2
28 Feb 2024	Euromedia	800	8.6	19.6	17.0	7.9	1.4	27.6	4.0		2.6	3.1	4.3				3.9	8.0
28 Feb 2024	Euromedia	800	8.7	20.0	17.2	8.5	1.2	28.1	3.9		2.5			3.5	4.0		2.4	8.1
26–28 Feb 2024	Bidimedia	1,000	8.5	20.0	15.5	7.5	0.8	28.1	3.9	1.5	2.4	3.0	4.3	1.2	1.3		2.0	8.1
25–28 Feb 2024	Cluster17	1,022	9.1	19.7	16.0	7.6	0.4	27.3	4.6	0.7	2.1	3.0	4.0	1.6	1.9		2.1	7.6
20–22 Feb 2024	Ipsos	1,000	8.3	18.3	17.0	7.9	1.1	28.2	3.5	1.8	2.2	3.6	3.3	1.0	2.0		1.8	9.9
17–22 Feb 2024	Stack Data Strategy	944	8.7	19.9	15.5	6.6	0.9	27.1	3.7	1.4	4.2	4.9	3.3		1.7		2.1	7.3
21 Feb 2024	Noto	–	8.0	19.5	18.0	7.0	2.0	27.5	3.5		3.5	3.0	3.5				4.5	8.0
30 Jan – 1 Feb 2024	Termometro Politico	3,800	9.4	19.6	16.2	6.8		29.1	3.0	1.5	2.4	2.6	3.8	1.7	1.4		2.5	9.5
30–31 Jan 2024	Demopolis	–	9.0	20.0	15.8	7.2		28.0	3.6		2.0	2.7	3.8				8.1	8.0
24–31 Jan 2024	Portland	502	7.0	21.0	16.0	10.0		28.0	3.0	2.0	3.0	5.0	2.0		1.0		2.0 (Note: SVP 0.0%)	7.0
24–27 Jan 2024	BiDiMedia	1,000	9.0	19.3	16.1	6.6	1.0	28.6	3.8	1.3	2.5	3.1	4.2	1.3	1.2		2.0	9.3
25–26 Jan 2024	Quorum	803	9.3	19.2	13.6	6.5	1.6	28.4	4.3		2.6	2.9	3.7		1.5		6.4	9.2
22–24 Jan 2024	Winpoll	1,000	9.1	21.5	14.6	7.8		27.8	3.0	1.5	2.4	2.5	3.2		1.3		5.3 (Note: PSI 0.8%)	6.3
12–22 Jan 2024	Euromedia	800	8.4	19.5	17.8	7.5	0.3	28.5	3.4		2.5	2.8	4.3		1.4		3.6	9.0
12–22 Jan 2024	Euromedia	800	8.2	19.0	18.1	7.2	0.3	29.3	3.3		2.4	3.3	4.6		1.4		2.9	9.3
16 Jan 2024	Noto	–	8.0	19.5	17.0	7.0	2.0	28.0	3.5		2.0	3.0	3.0				7.0	8.5 (Note: With party symbols)
16 Jan 2024	Noto	–	6.5	20.0	17.0	6.5	1.5	32.0	4.0		2.0	3.0	3.0				4.5	12.0
15–16 Jan 2024	Tecnè	800	8.4	19.8	15.6	9.2		29.0				2.9	3.9				11.2	9.2
15–16 Jan 2024	Tecnè	800	8.3	19.5	15.6	9.3		29.3				2.9	3.9				11.0	9.8
4 Jan 2024	IZI	1,068	9.3	19.5	17.0	7.4		27.1	4.2		3.0	3.0	3.5				6.0	7.6
30 Dec – 4 Jan 2024	Lab2101	1,000	10.2	19.8	16.2	5.8	0.7	29.4	4.0		2.3	2.8	3.9		2.3		2.6	9.6
26 May 2019	2019 European election	–	34.3	22.7	17.1	8.8		6.4	4.1 (Note: Combined results for Green Europe (EV) and The Left (LS) lists at the election)		3.1	–	–	0.9	–	–	4.5	7.6

=== Seat projections ===
Polling firm	Fieldwork date	League ID	PD S&D	M5S NI	FI EPP	FdI ECR	SVP EPP	+E Renew	IV Renew	Action Renew	AVS G–EFA–GUE/NGL	Italexit	UP	Others	Lead
election.de	6 June 2024	7	18	13	7	23	0	3	1 (Note: With +E)	—N/a	4	—N/a	—N/a	—N/a	5
Europe Elects	4 June 2024	7	17	14	5	22	1	1	4	4	3	—N/a	—N/a	—N/a	5
Cluster 17	21 May 2024	7-8	18	13	7	23	0-1	4		0-4	0-4				5
Bidimedia	20 May 2024	7	17	12	6	22	1	4		3	4				5
election.de	9 May 2024	7	18	15	7	24	1	3	1	—N/a	—N/a	—N/a	—N/a	—N/a	6
Europe Elects	28 Apr 2024	7	17	14	7	25	1	1	3	—N/a	3	—N/a	—N/a	—N/a	8
Der Föderalist	26 Apr 2024	7	18	14	8	24	1	4		—N/a	—N/a	—N/a	—N/a	—N/a	6
election.de	22 Apr 2024	7	18	14	7	24	1	2	3	—N/a	—N/a	—N/a	—N/a	—N/a	6
Europe Elects	16 Apr 2024	8	17	13	5	25	1	—N/a	—N/a	4	3	—N/a	—N/a	—N/a	8
election.de	8 Apr 2024	7	18	15	6	25	1	—N/a	—N/a	—N/a	4	—N/a	—N/a	—N/a	7
election.de	22 Mar 2024	7	18	15	6	25	1	—N/a	—N/a	—N/a	4	—N/a	—N/a	—N/a	7
election.de	8 Mar 2024	7	17	15	6	24	1	—N/a	—N/a	3	3	—N/a	—N/a	—N/a	7
Europe Elects	4 Mar 2024	8	17	15	5	25	1	—N/a	—N/a	—N/a	5	—N/a	—N/a	—N/a	8
election.de	7 Feb 2024	9	19	15	5	27	1	—N/a	—N/a	—N/a	—N/a	—N/a	—N/a	—N/a	8
ECFR	23 Jan 2024	8	14	13	7	27	1	—N/a	6		—N/a	—N/a	—N/a	—N/a	9
Der Föderalist	11 Jan 2024	8	16	14	6	25	1	—N/a	—N/a	6	—N/a	—N/a	—N/a	—N/a	9
election.de	9 Jan 2024	8	17	15	6	25	1	—N/a	—N/a	4	—N/a	—N/a	—N/a	—N/a	8
Europe Elects	30 Dec 2023	8	17	15	5	26	1	—N/a	—N/a	4	—N/a	—N/a	—N/a	—N/a	9
Europe Elects	30 Nov 2023	9	17	14	5	26	1	—N/a	—N/a	4	—N/a	—N/a	—N/a	—N/a	9
Der Föderalist	06 Nov 2023	8	17	14	7	25	1	—N/a	—N/a	5	—N/a	—N/a	—N/a	—N/a	8
Europe Elects	31 Oct 2023	8	17	14	4	25	1	—N/a	—N/a	4	3	—N/a	—N/a	—N/a	8
Europe Elects	30 Sep 2023	9	19	14	4	25	1	—N/a	—N/a	4	—N/a	—N/a	—N/a	—N/a	6
Der Föderalist	11 Sep 2023	8	17	14	7	25	1	—N/a	—N/a	5	—N/a	—N/a	—N/a	—N/a	8
Europe Elects	31 Aug 2023	9	19	15	5	27	1	—N/a	—N/a	—N/a	—N/a	—N/a	—N/a	—N/a	8
Europe Elects	31 Jul 2023	9	19	15	5	27	1	—N/a	—N/a	—N/a	—N/a	—N/a	—N/a	—N/a	8
Der Föderalist	17 Jul 2023	8	16	13	7	24	1	—N/a	8		—N/a	—N/a	—N/a	—N/a	8
Europe Elects	28 Jun 2023	8	18	15	6	28	1	—N/a	—N/a	—N/a	—N/a	—N/a	—N/a	—N/a	10
Europe Elects	31 May 2023	8	18	15	4	26	1	—N/a	—N/a	4	—N/a	—N/a	—N/a	—N/a	8
Der Föderalist	22 May 2023	8	18	14	7	25	1	—N/a	—N/a	4	—N/a	—N/a	—N/a	—N/a	7
Europe Elects	30 Apr 2023	9	17	14	4	24	1	—N/a	7		—N/a	—N/a	—N/a	—N/a	7
Der Föderalist	27 Mar 2023	8	16	14	7	25	1	—N/a	5		—N/a	—N/a	—N/a	—N/a	9
Der Föderalist	1 Feb 2023	8	14	15	7	25	1	—N/a	6		—N/a	—N/a	—N/a	—N/a	10
2019 European election	26 May 2019	29	19	14	7	6	1	—N/a	—N/a	—N/a	—N/a	—N/a	—N/a	—N/a	10

== Results ==
Results of the election, showing vote strength by comune

← Summary of 8–9 June 2024 European Parliament election results in Italy →
Party	Votes	%	+/−	Seats	+/−
Brothers of Italy (FdI)	6,733,906	28.76	+22.32	24 / 76	+18
Democratic Party (PD)	5,646,332	24.11	+1.37	21 / 76	+2
Five Star Movement (M5S)	2,336,251	9.98	−7.08	8 / 76	−6
Forza Italia – Us Moderates (FI–NM)	2,244,678	9.59	+0.81	8 / 76	+1
League (Lega)	2,100,658	8.97	−25.29	8 / 76	−21
Greens and Left Alliance (AVS)	1,588,168	6.78	+2.71	6 / 76	+6
United States of Europe (SUE)	883,914	3.77	+0.66	0 / 76	±0
Action – We Are Europeans (A–SE)	785,710	3.36	New	0 / 76	New
Peace Land Dignity (PTD)	517,725	2.21	New	0 / 76	New
Freedom	285,766	1.22	New	0 / 76	New
South Tyrolean People's Party (SVP)	120,879	0.52	−0.01	1 / 76	±0
Popular Alternative (AP)	91,395	0.39	−0.04	0 / 76	±0
Sovereign Popular Democracy (DSP)	36,223	0.15	New	0 / 76	New
Animalist Party – Italexit	29,525	0.13	−0.47	0 / 76	±0
Valdostan Rally (RV)	14,457	0.06	New	0 / 76	New
Valid votes		23,415,587	94.65		
Blank and Invalid votes		1,324,643	5.35		
Totals		24,740,230	100.00		
Electorate and voter turnout		51,214,348	48.31		
Source: Ministry of the Interior

Popular vote
FdI	28.8%
PD	24.1%
M5S	10.0%
FI	9.6%
Lega	9.0%
AVS	6.8%
SUE	3.8%
Az	3.4%
PTD	2.2%
Freedom	1.2%
Others	1.1%

Seats distribution
FdI	31.6%
PD	27.6%
M5S	10.5%
FI	10.5%
Lega	10.5%
AVS	7.9%
SVP	1.3%

=== Distribution by European group ===
European Parliament group	Seats	National party	Seats
European Conservatives and Reformists	24 / 76	Brothers of Italy (FdI)	24
Progressive Alliance of Socialists and Democrats	21 / 76	Democratic Party (PD)	21
The Left in the European Parliament	10 / 76	Five Star Movement (M5S)	8
The Left in the European Parliament	10 / 76	Greens and Left Alliance (AVS)	2
European People's Party Group	9 / 76	Forza Italia (FI)	8
European People's Party Group	9 / 76	South Tyrolean People's Party (SVP)	1
Patriots for Europe	8 / 76	League (Lega)	8
Greens–European Free Alliance	4 / 76	Greens and Left Alliance (AVS)	4

=== Analysis ===
In what was the European Parliament election in Italian history with the lowest voter turnout (48.3% compared to the 54.5% of 2019), FdI emerged as the largest party with almost 29% of the votes. The results were thus seen as a victory for the incumbent Meloni government; however, the combined number of seats obtained by the most Eurosceptic and anti-European Green Deal government parties (FdI and Lega) was three seats lower than in 2019. Pro-Green Deal Italian representation was strengthened by the growth of the PD, while the M5S declined, leaving uncertainty about to which political group it would join in the European Parliament and whether it would do so; the M5S ultimately joined The Left in the European Parliament – GUE/NGL, also reflecting its left-wing shift at the European level. The liberal and centrist parties and electoral lists narrowly failed to reach the 4% threshold.

As the parties suffering the most losses in terms of seats and votes, the League and M5S were seen as the biggest losers compared to the 2019. Compared to the 2022 general election results, even as they increased or held similar percentage points, all the government parties lost total votes. The only parties that gained more votes compared to 2022 were the PD and AVS, which together surpassed FdI. The youth vote among those under 30 in Italy favoured the Progressive Camp of the PD, M5S, and AVS at 51%.

== See also ==
- 2024 European Parliament election in Lombardy
- 2024 European Parliament election in Piedmont
