= Adinolfi =

Adinolfi is an Italian surname of Germanic origin. Notable people with the surname include:

- Al Adinolfi (1934–2019), American politician
- Edgardo Adinolfi (born 1974), Uruguayan footballer
- Gabriele Adinolfi (born 1954), Italian neo-fascist
- Gaetano Adinolfi, Deputy Secretary General of the Council of Europe
- Isabella Adinolfi (born 1978), Italian politician
- Mario Adinolfi (born 1971), Italian journalist
- Matteo Adinolfi (born 1963), Italian politician
