= Pignedoli =

Pignedoli may refer to:

- 22263 Pignedoli, minor aster discovered by Antonio Pignedoli, a mathematics professor at the Military Academy of Modena

== People ==
- Sabrina Pignedoli (born 1983), Italian politician and Member of the European Parliament since 2019
- Sergio Pignedoli (1910–1980), a prominent Italian Cardinal of the Roman Catholic Church and a top candidate for Pope
