= Marco Zullo =

Italian politician

Marco Zullo MEP
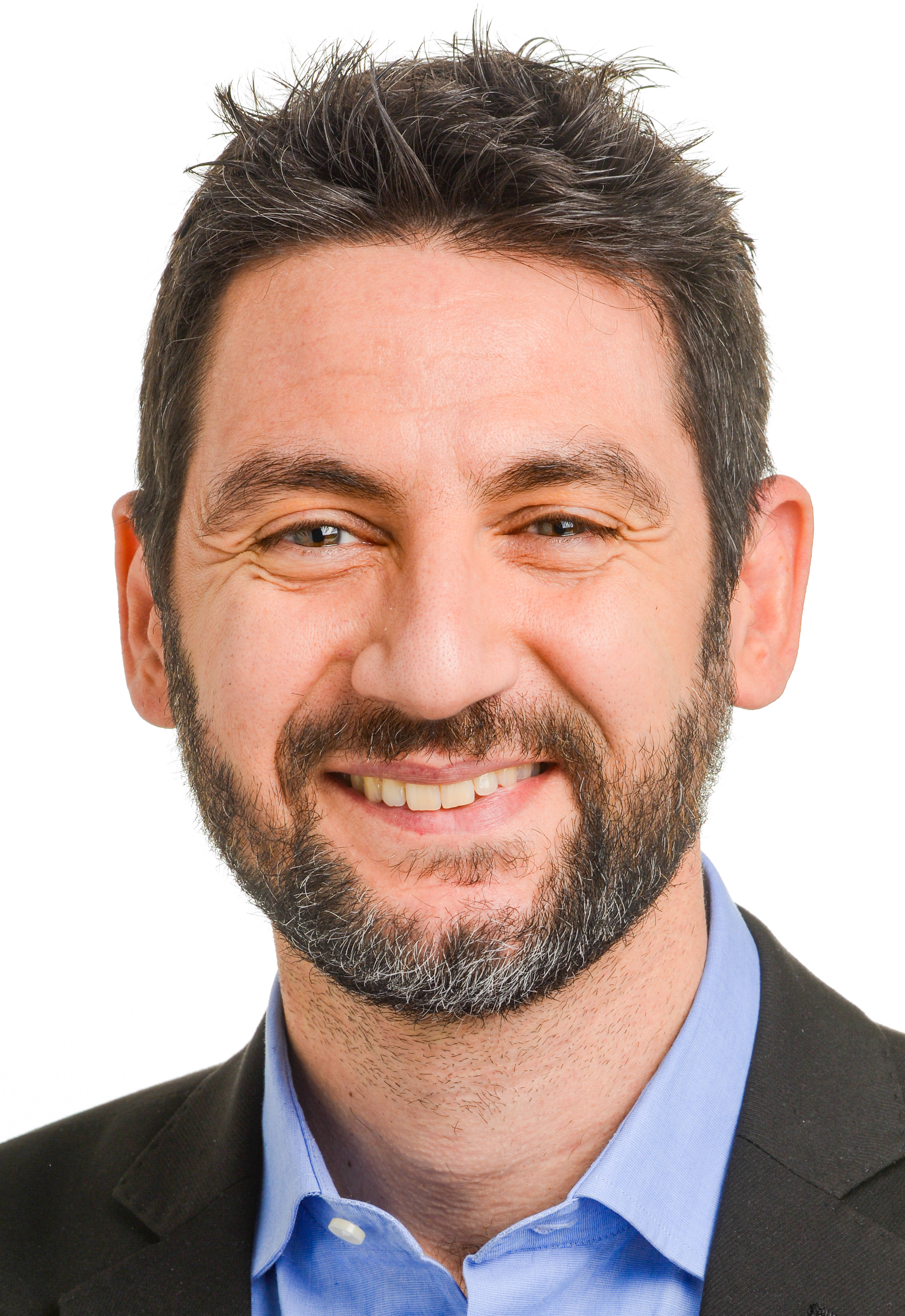

Member of the European Parliament for North-East Italy
- Incumbent
- Assumed office 1 July 2014

Personal details
- Born: 29 October 1978 (age 47)
- Party: Five Star Movement (2014–2021)
- Education: University of Padua
- Profession: Product manager

Marco Zullo (born 29 October 1978 in Verona) is an Italian politician who has been serving as a Member of the European Parliament since 2014. He was re-elected in 2019. From 2014 to 2021, he was part of the Five Star Movement.

== Education and early career ==
Zullo holds a bachelor's degree in computer science and electronic engineering from University of Padua. From 2012 to 2014, he worked as product manager for Hager Group in Porcia.

== Political career ==
In parliament, Zullo has been serving on the Committee on the Internal Market and Consumer Protection (since 2015) and the Committee on Women's Rights and Gender Equality (since 2019). From 2014 to 2019, he was also a member of the Committee on Agriculture and Rural Development.

In addition to his committee assignments, Zullo is part of the parliament's delegation to the EU-Albania Stabilisation and Association Parliamentary Committee. He co-chairs the European Parliament Intergroup on Demographic Challenges, Family-Work Balance and Youth Transitions and is also a member of the European Parliament Intergroup on the Welfare and Conservation of Animals and the Parliament's Cultural Creators Friendship Group (CCFG).

In 2021, Zullo joined the Renew Europe group in the European Parliament.
