= Alessandra Basso =

Italian politician

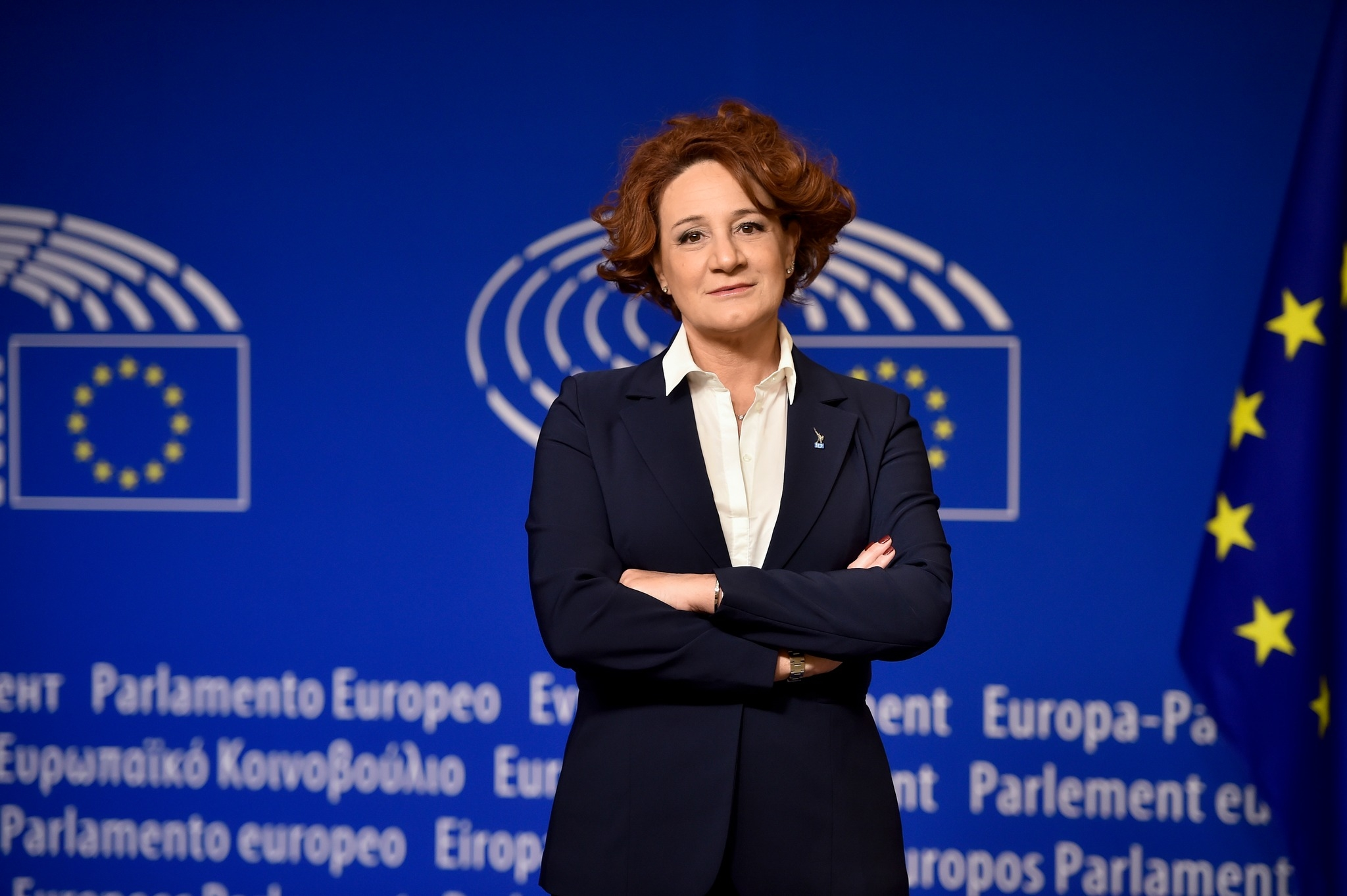

Member of the European Parliament for North-East Italy
- In office 2 July 2019 – 9 June 2024

Personal details
- Born: 14 March 1967 (age 59) Treviso, Italy
- Party: League
- Education: University of Bologna
- Profession: Lawyer

Alessandra Basso (born 14 March 1967) is an Italian lawyer and politician who was elected as a member of the European Parliament in 2019.

== Biography ==
She was born in Treviso, where she graduated from the Liceo Classico Pio X in 1986. She lives and works in Bologna, where she earned her law degree from the University of Bologna in 1992. She has been a member of the Bologna Bar Association since December 15, 1997.
