= Elena Lizzi =

Italian politician

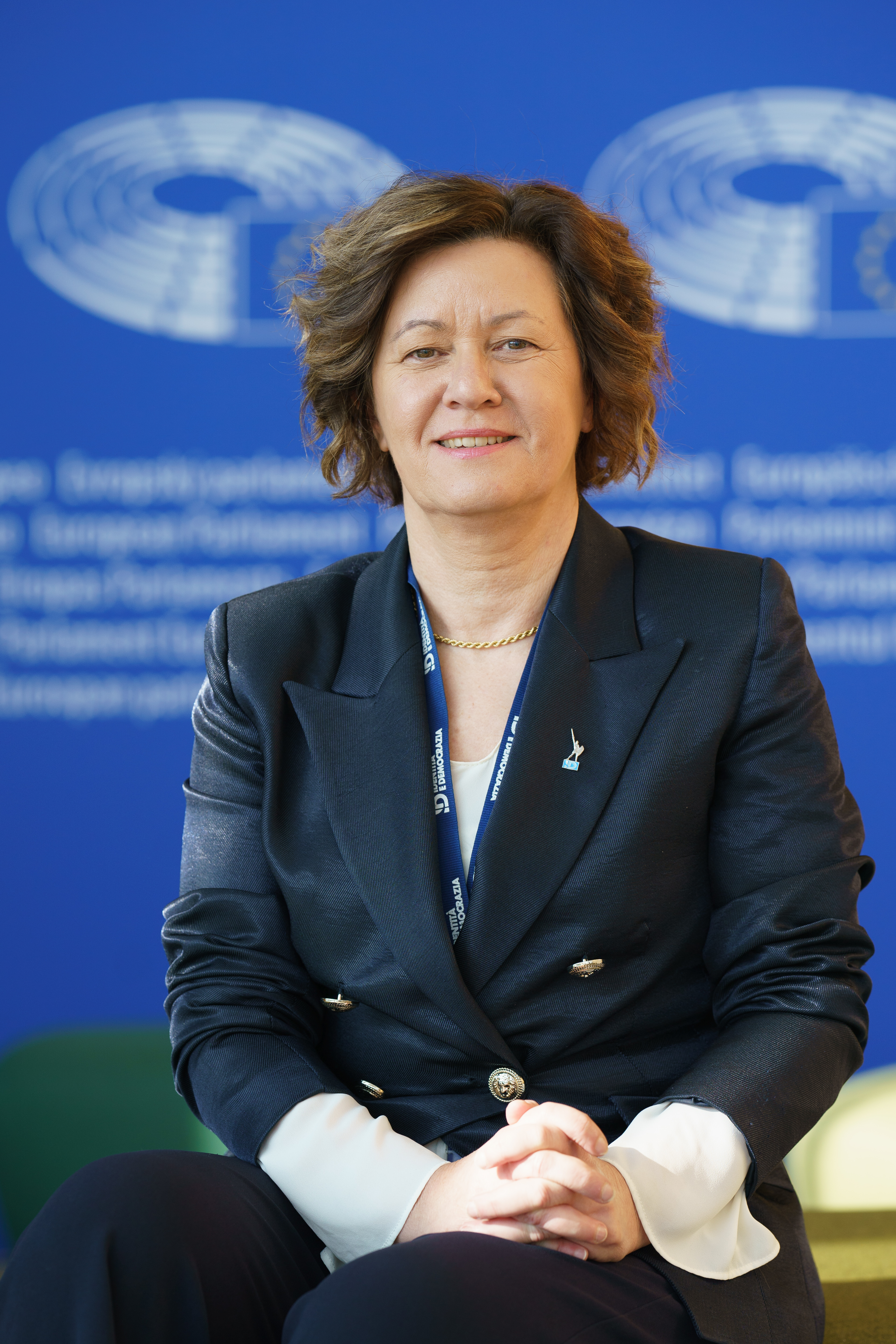

Member of the European Parliament for North-East Italy
- In office 2 July 2019 – 9 June 2024

Personal details
- Party: League

Elena Lizzi (born 30 October 1967 in San Daniele del Friuli) is an Italian politician.

She served as Assessor for Culture and Identity, Education, Equal Opportunities of the Province of Udine (from 2008 to 2013). She also is Deputy Mayor of the municipality of Buja. Since 2017 she is Assessor for Environment, Production activities, Community projects and Tourism, ever of the municipality of Buja.

In 2019 she has been elected as a Member of the European Parliament.
