= Rosanna Conte =

Italian politician

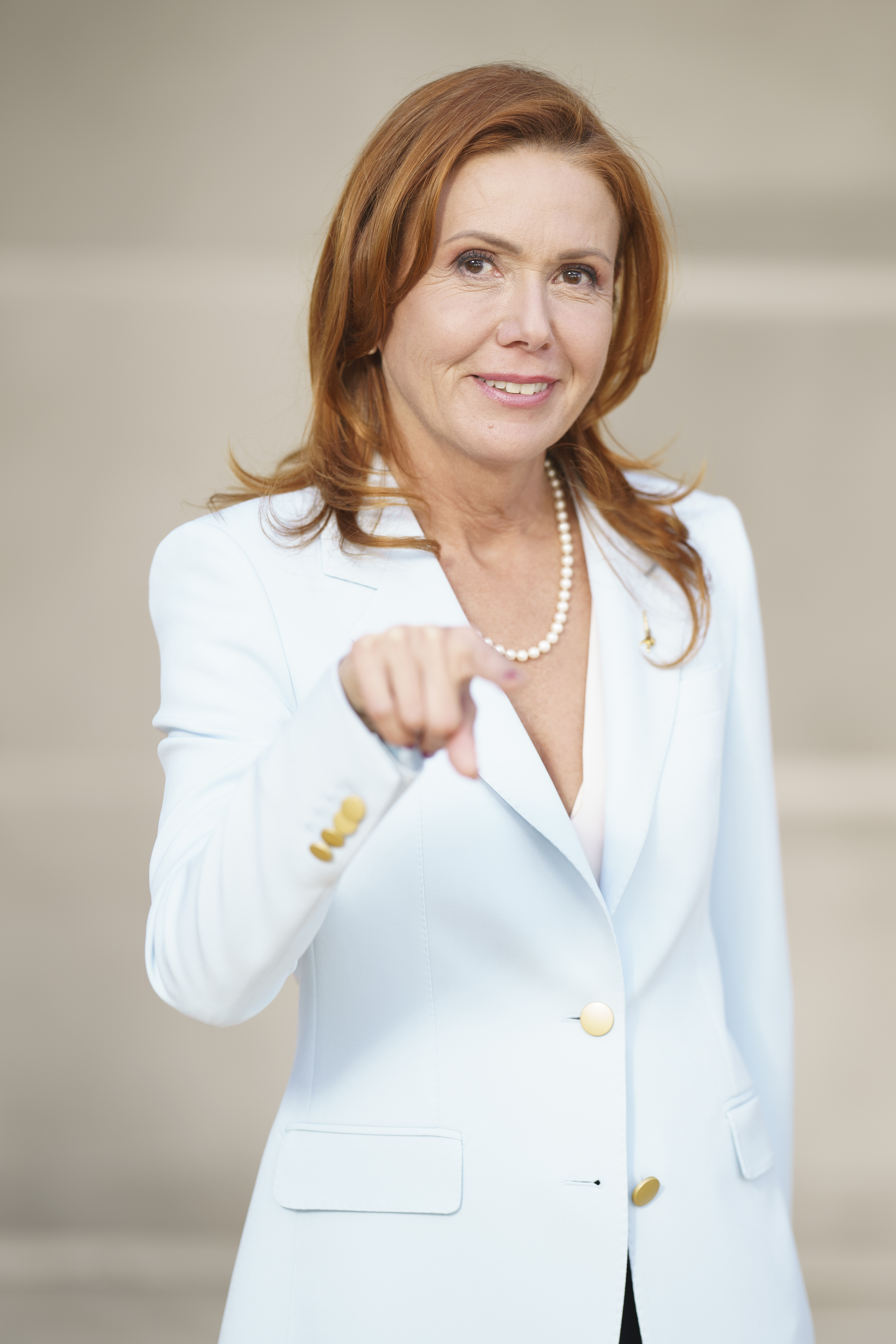

Member of the European Parliament for North-East Italy
- In office 2 July 2019 – 9 June 2024

Personal details
- Party: League
- Education: University of Bologna
- Profession: Lawyer

Rosanna Conte (born 17 April 1968 in Portogruaro) is an Italian politician who was elected as a member of the European Parliament in 2019.
