= Paolo Borchia =

Italian politician

Paolo Borchia MEP
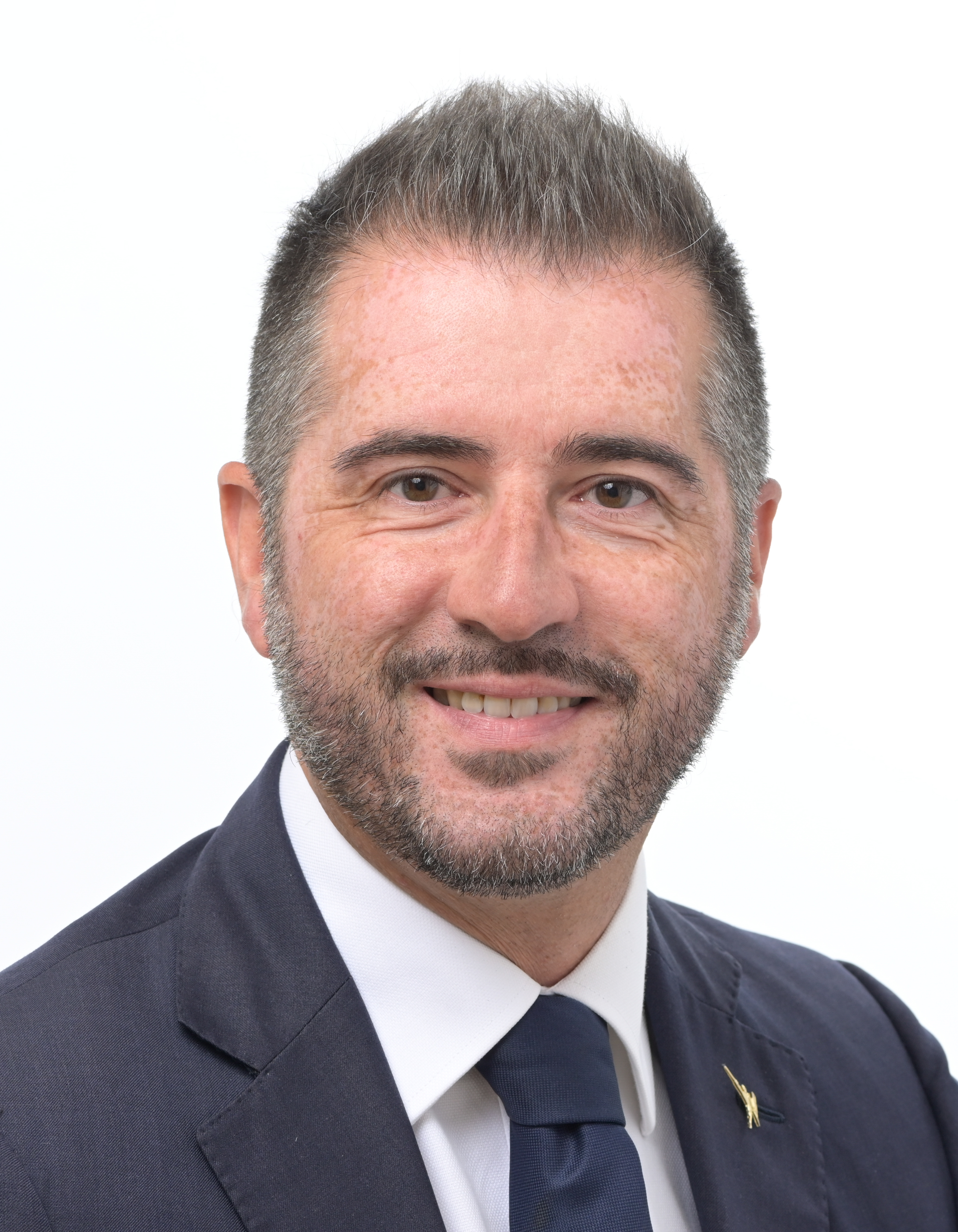

Member of the European Parliament for North-East Italy
- Incumbent
- Assumed office 2 July 2019

Personal details
- Party: League

Paolo Borchia (Negrar, 27 May 1980) is a North Italian politician and a Member of the European Parliament since July 2019.

== Biography ==
Paolo Borchia was born in Negrar.

A political science graduate of the University of Padua, he completed his education with a thesis of excellence on "Anarcho-syndicalism and Catalanism in Republican Spain (1931-1936)", after carrying out an extensive research programme at the Universitat Autònoma de Barcelona.

He began his career in the marble sector as an administration and production manager for the family-run business, until he later accepted a job offer as a consultant for a financial services company.

In 2010 he moved to Brussels, where he took up duties at the European Parliament in the capacity of accredited parliamentary assistant to Lorenzo Fontana MEP.

After six years of service, he was appointed as political adviser to the Parliament’s Europe of Freedom and Nations (ENF) political group, which assigned him to the legislative committee on Industry, Research and Energy (ITRE) and the legislative committee on Transport and Tourism (TRAN).

=== Political Activity ===
In the course of the Federal Congress of the Lega Nord which was held in Turin in December 2013 and which resulted in the election of Matteo Salvini as Secretary of the party, he was actively involved in the negotiations that would later lead to the building of the European alliance between the Lega Nord, the French Front National, the Austrian FPOE, the Dutch PVV and the Belgian Vlaams Belang.

In July 2018, the party’s Federal Council appointed him as Head of its international Department "Lega nel Mondo", which focuses on supporting Italian nationals abroad as well as coordinating the political activity of the foreign sections of the party.

In November 2018, he represented the party in Sofia at the meeting promoted by the Foundation for Europe of Freedoms and Nations, where he outlined the party’s strategy to reform EU governance in connection with the forthcoming European elections of 26 May.

In May 2019, he run for the European elections in the constituency of the North-East of Italy and was elected with 37,441 preferences. Once in office, he was appointed as coordinator of the "Identity and Democracy" political group in the committee for Industry, Research and Energy (ITRE), while also being appointed as member of the Committee on Transport and Tourism (TRAN) and the Delegation to the Euro-Latin American Parliamentary Assembly.

He began his mandate as an MEP by promoting the initiative "Enterprise and Europe", which features training courses for entrepreneurs and administrators of the Italian North-East and focuses on improving awareness of and access to the existing financial opportunities at the regional, ministerial and European level.

In February 2020, he was the only Italian politician to attend the Conservative Political Action Conference in Washington D.C., where he presented through a series of high-level meetings the political strategy of the Lega, with particular attention to the promotion of structural change within EU governance and the national implementation of the flat-tax scheme.

Following the beginning of the coronavirus pandemic, he was actively involved in diplomatic actions in cooperation with the Italian diplomatic network and the European External Action Service in order to facilitate the repatriation of Italian nationals stranded abroad. He contributed to the rescue of Italian citizens from critical settings, such as Burkina Faso, Nepal, Tajikistan and the Dominican Republic.

Within this framework, he was the first to question and expose to the public opinion’s attention the handling of the rescue operations by the Italian Ministry of Foreign Affairs, as well as its controversial use of the resources offered by European Civil Protection Mechanism.

In April 2020, he was appointed as rapporteur for the own-initiative parliamentary report on the future European strategy for small and medium-sized enterprises. The document identified a set of primary legislative objectives such as the simplification of tax systems, the streamlining of bureaucracy, the modernization of work tools through concrete and immediate tax incentives, the simplification of access to credit and, last but not least, ensuring access to direct economic support in cases of exceptional difficulty. Concerning trade policies towards non-EU countries, the report defined a framework of reference to ensure the protection and resilience of SMEs and the European economic system as a whole in the face of growing deregulation of the world market's competition. The final text was voted by the European Parliament’s plenary session on 16 December 2020 and was approved with 533 votes in favour, 58 against and 82 abstentions. As a Member of the TRAN committee, he contributed to the approval of the Mobility Package through his appointment as shadow rapporteur on the directive on posting of workers in the transport sector. Concerning the traffic restrictions adopted by the Tyrolean government, he sided with transport undertakings affected by the measures and promoted the creation of a working group to negotiate a crisis resolution. Within the cultural field, he launched through his own social media the series "The hidden truths" that hosted, among others, writer Antonia Arslan as well as magistrate Alfonso Sabella.
