= Alessandro Panza =

Italian politician

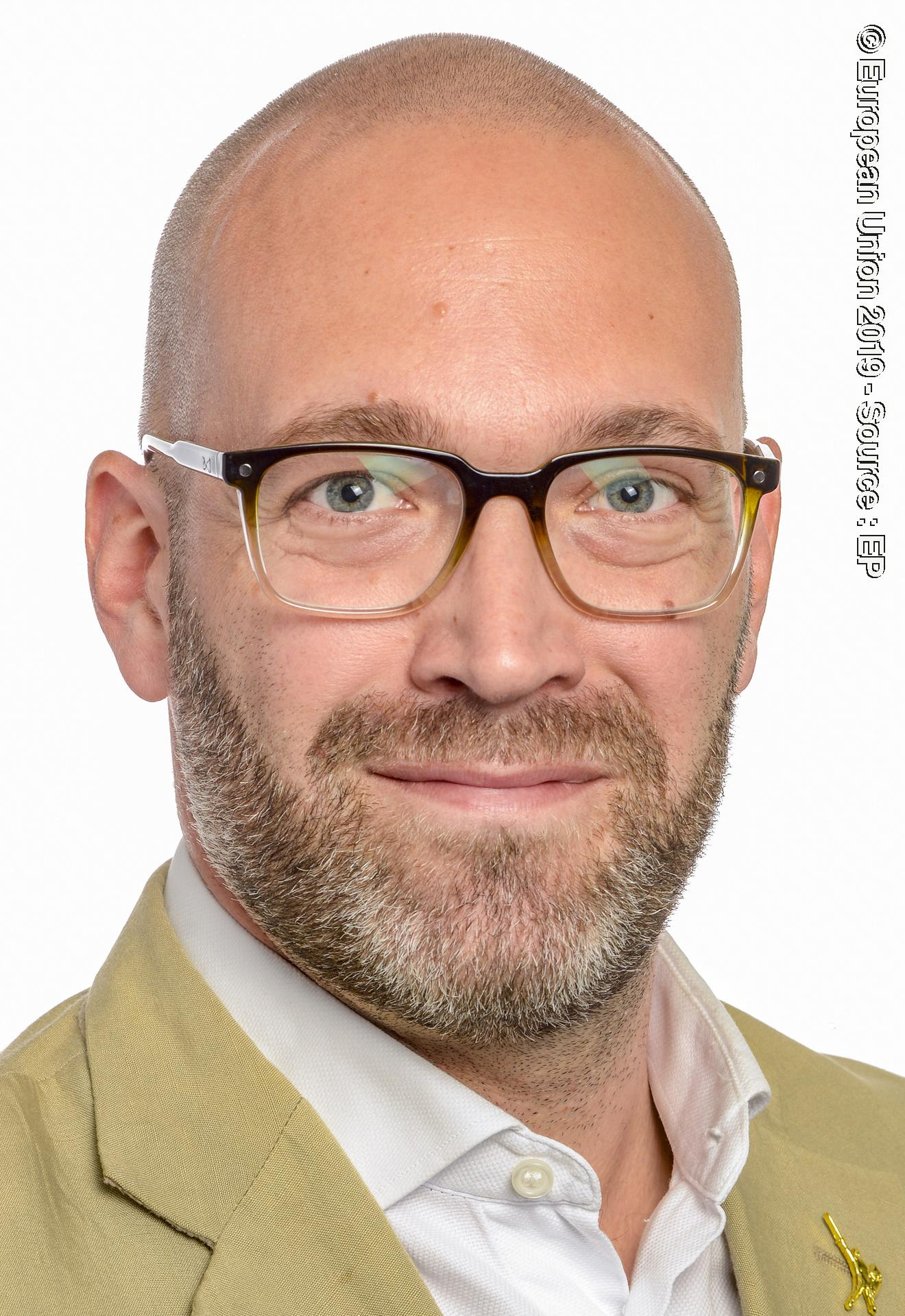

Member of the European Parliament for North-West Italy
- In office 2 July 2019 – 9 June 2024

Personal details
- Party: League

Alessandro Panza (born 15 May 1982 in Domodossola) is an Italian politician and Member of the European Parliament since 2019.
