= Stefania Zambelli =

Italian politician

Stefania Zambelli MEP
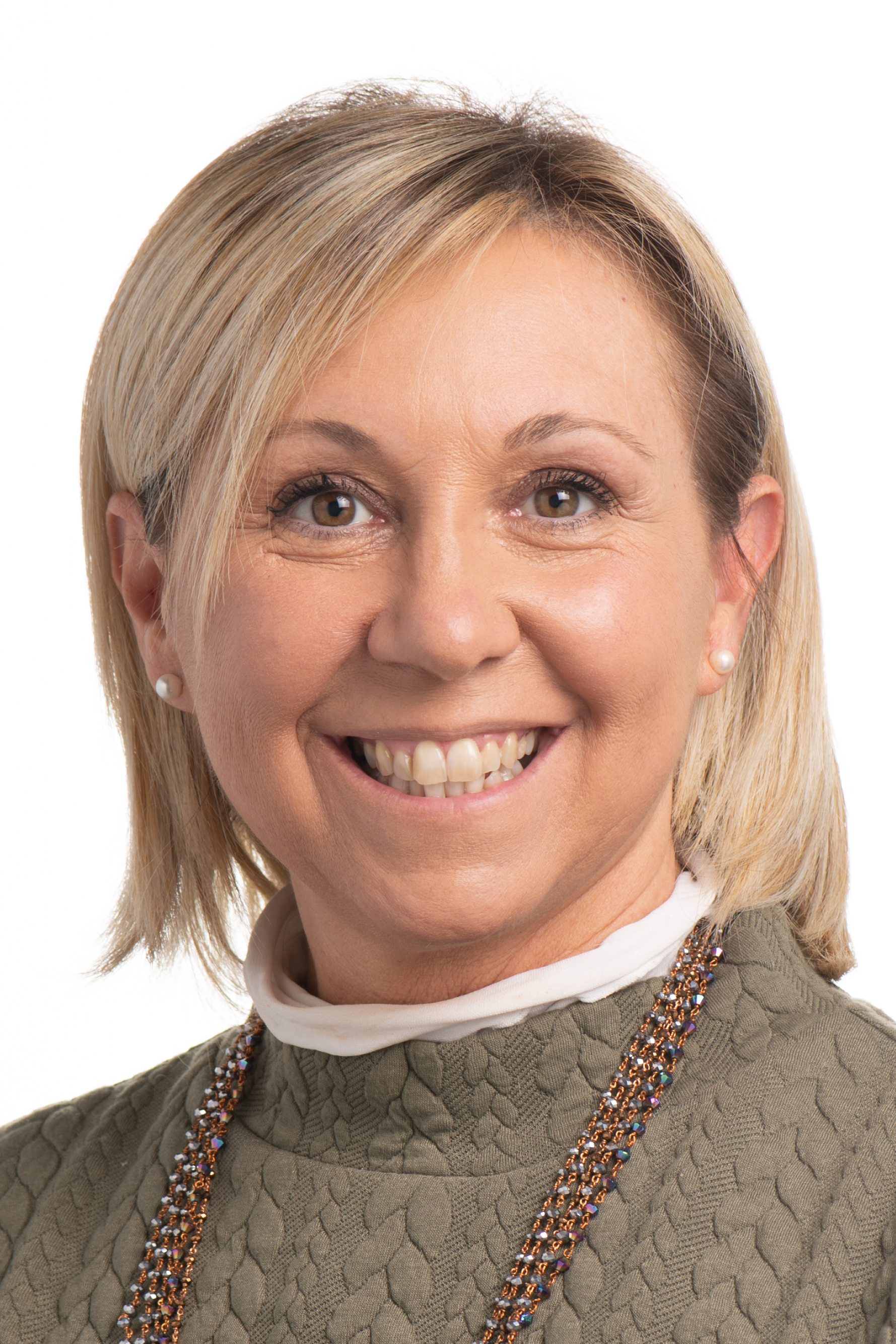

Member of the European Parliament for North-West Italy
- Incumbent
- Assumed office 2 July 2019

Personal details
- Party: FI (since 2023)
- Other political affiliations: League (1995–2023)

Stefania Zambelli (born 6 April 1971 in Salò) is an Italian politician who was elected as a Member of the European Parliament in 2019.
