= Franco Roberti =

Italian politician

Franco Roberti OMRI, MEP
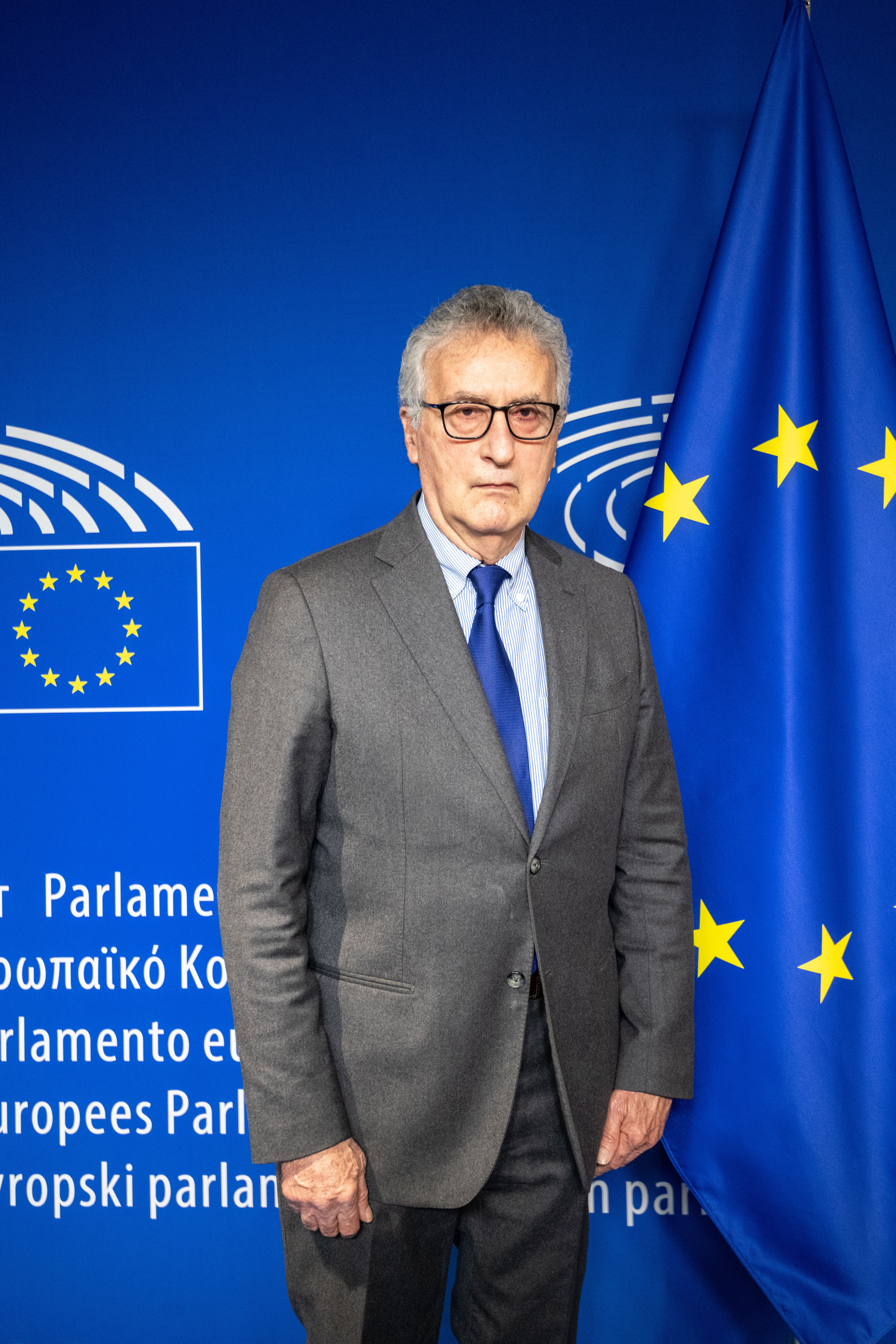

Member of the European Parliament for Southern Italy
- Incumbent
- Assumed office 2 July 2019

Personal details
- Born: 16 November 1947 (age 78) Naples, Italy
- Party: Democratic Party
- Education: University of Naples Federico II
- Profession: Magistrate

Franco Roberti (born 16 November 1947) is an Italian magistrate and politician, member of the European Parliament since 2019.

== Biography ==
=== Career as prosecutor ===
Early in his career, Roberti worked as anti-mafia prosecutor in Naples. In 2007, he managed to arrest mafia boss Edoardo Contini, at the time considered one of Italy's 30 most dangerous fugitives.

Roberti served as National anti-mafia and anti-terrorist prosecutor from 2013 to 2017. During his time in office, he led a 2016 effort of Italian, Colombian and U.S. police to seize 11 tonnes of cocaine and arrest 33 people from a mafia-linked ring which refined the drug in the jungles of Colombia and smuggled it out in containers of tropical fruits. He also worked to ensure the mafia is blocked from playing any role in reconstruction after the August 2016 Central Italy earthquake that killed nearly 300 people.

=== Member of the European Parliament ===
In 2019 Robert has been elected as a member of the European Parliament. In the European Parliament, he has since been serving on the Committee on Legal Affairs (JURI). In addition to his committees assignments, he is a member of the parliament's delegations for relations with the Mashreq countries and to the Parliamentary Assembly of the Union for the Mediterranean. He is also a substitute member of several other EP committees, including LIBE (Committee on Civil Liberties, Justice and Home Affairs).
