= Lucia Vuolo =

Italian politician

Lucia Vuolo MEP
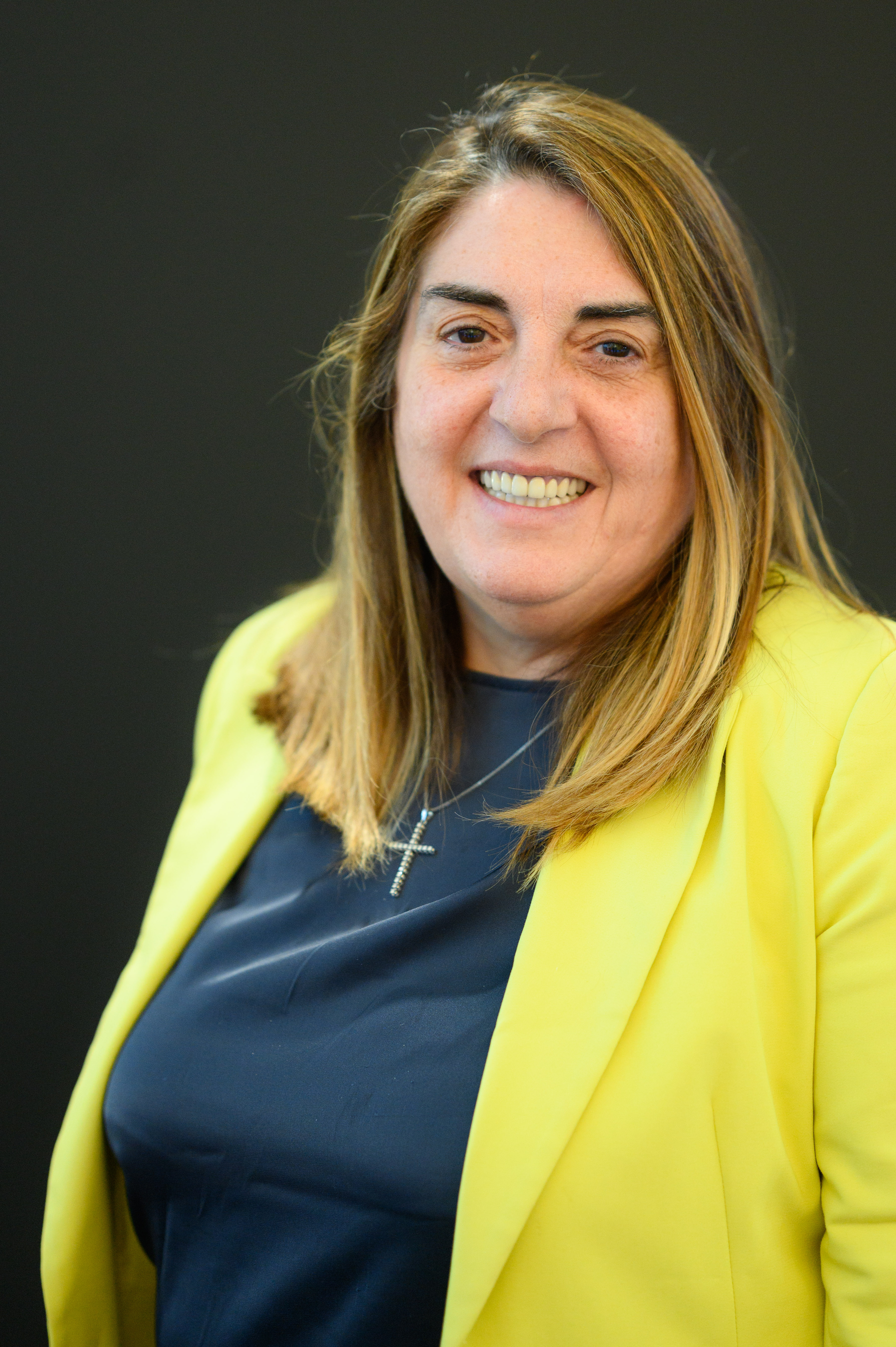

Member of the European Parliament for Southern Italy
- Incumbent
- Assumed office 2 July 2019

Personal details
- Party: Forza Italia (since 2021)
- Other political affiliations: League (until 2021)
- Website: www.luciavuolo.eu

Lucia Vuolo (born 15 February 1963) is an Italian politician and a Member of the European Parliament since 2019.
