= Massimo Casanova =

Italian politician

Massimo Casanova MEP
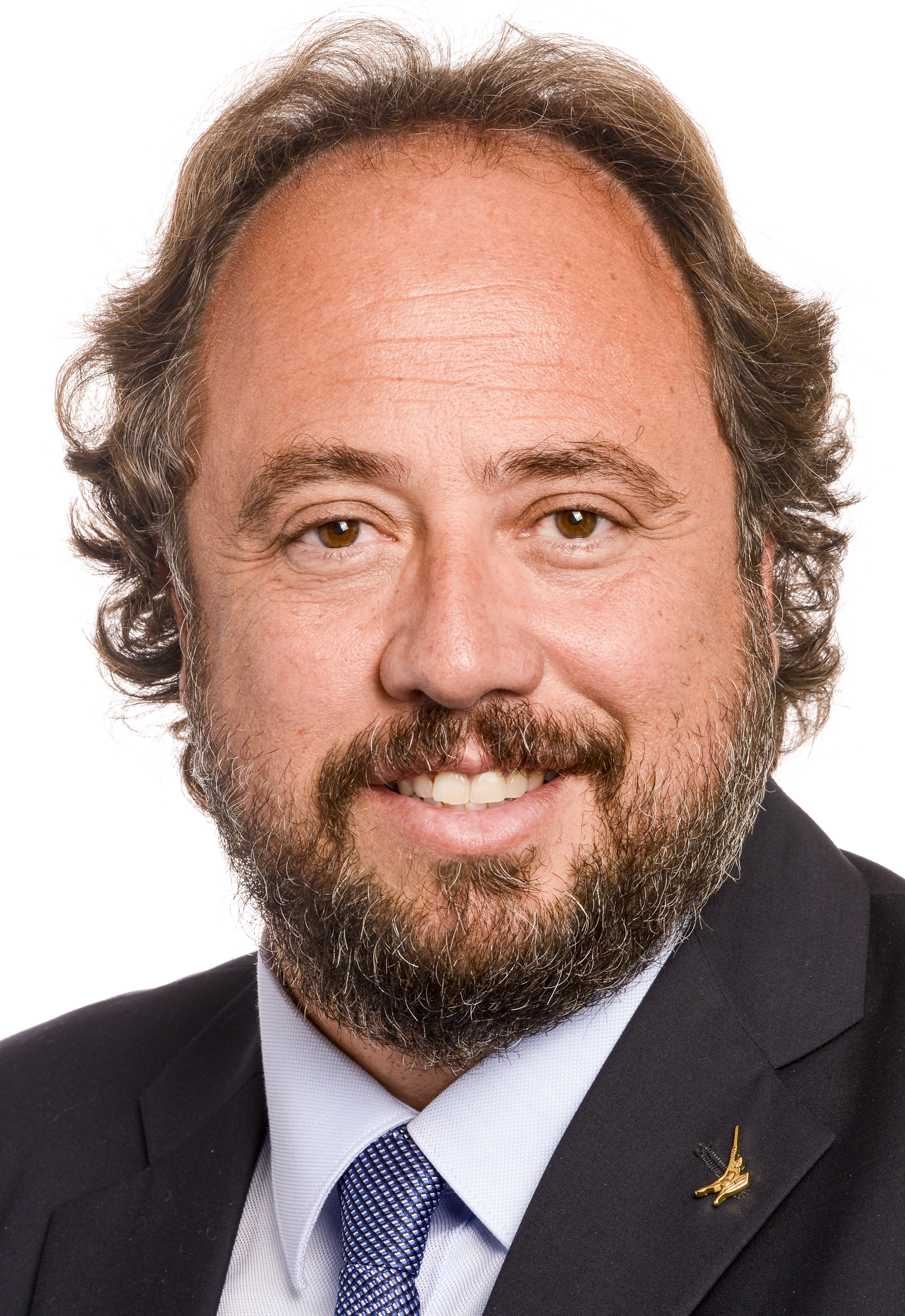

Member of the European Parliament for Southern Italy
- Incumbent
- Assumed office 2 July 2019

Personal details
- Party: League

Massimo Casanova (born 31 August 1970, in Bologna) is an Italian politician who was elected as a member of the European Parliament in 2019.

He is the owner of the Papeete Beach disco in Milano Marittima.
