= Annalisa Tardino =

Italian politician

Annalisa Tardino MEP
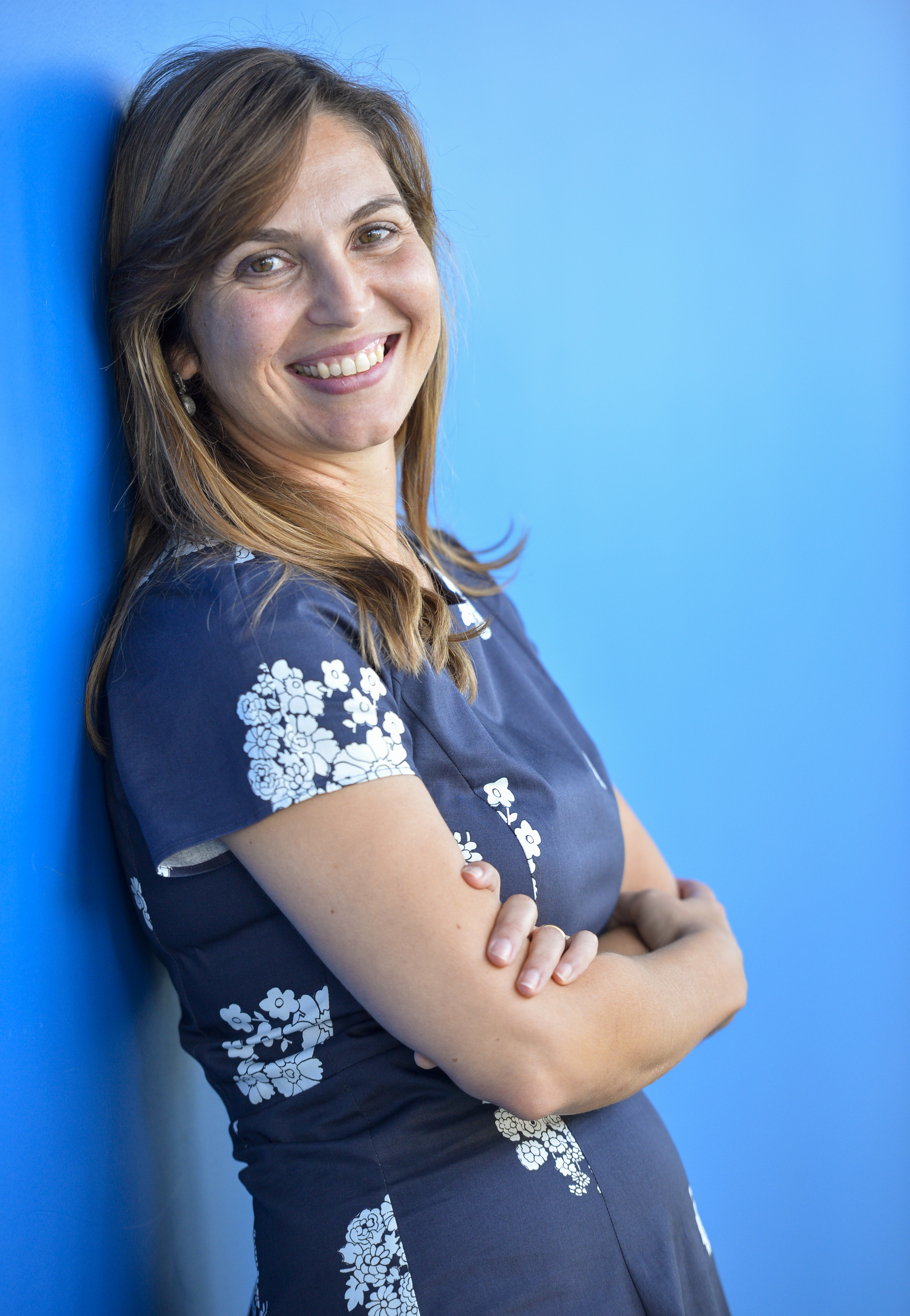

Member of the European Parliament for Italian Islands
- Incumbent
- Assumed office 2 July 2019

Personal details
- Born: April 30, 1979 (age 47) Licata
- Party: League
- Education: University of Palermo
- Profession: Lawyer

Annalisa Tardino (born 30 April 1979 in Licata) is an Italian politician who was elected as a Member of the European Parliament in 2019.

She has been the parliament’s LIBE rapporteur on the European Commission’s proposal for a European Health Data Space.
