= Francesca Donato =

Italian politician (born 1969)

Francesca Donato MEP
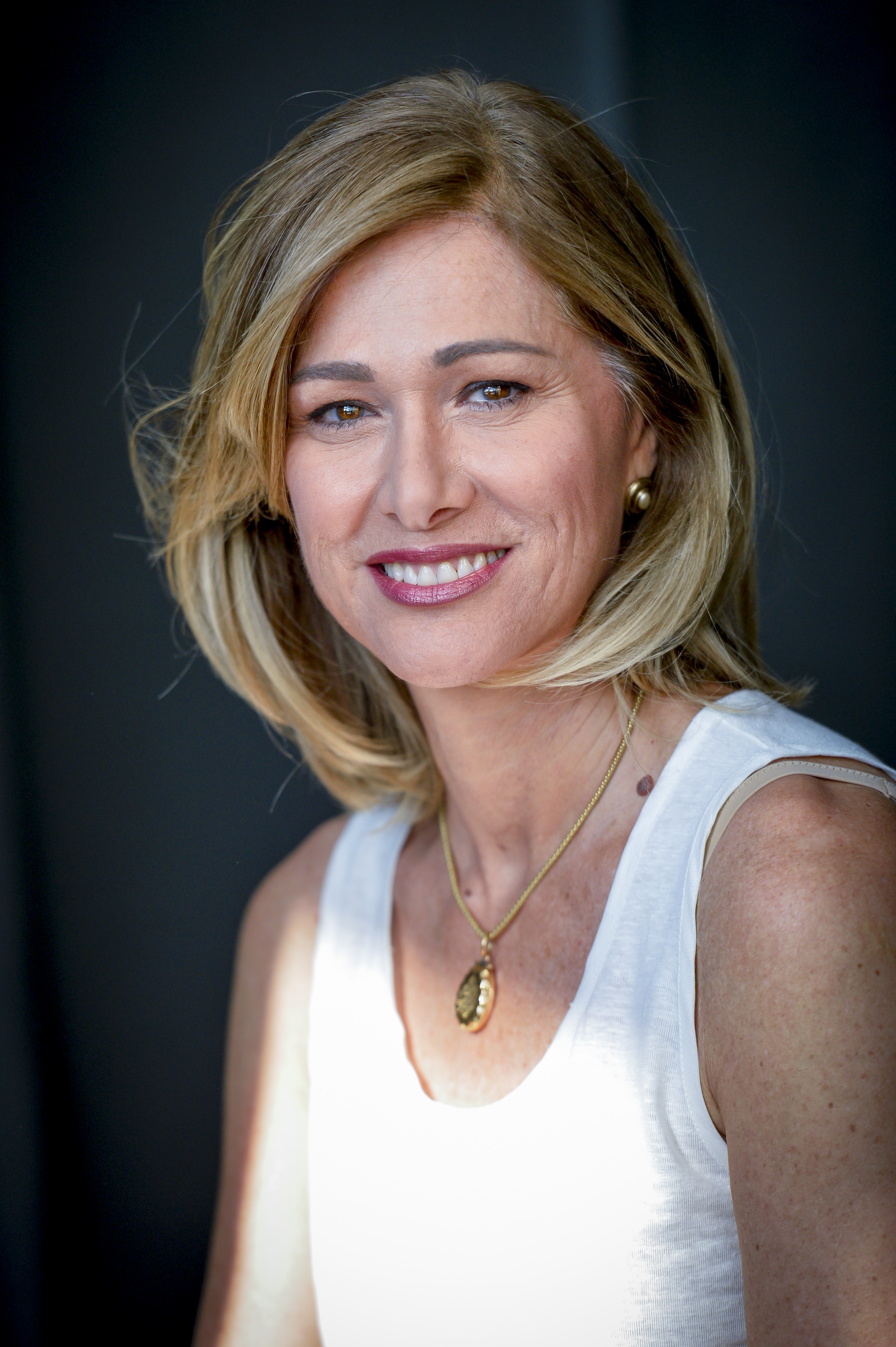

Member of the European Parliament for Italy
- In office 1 July 2019 – 16 July 2024

Personal details
- Born: 25 August 1969 (age 57) Ancona, Italy
- Party: Christian Democracy (since 2023)
- Other political affiliations: League (2014–2021)
- Height: 1.75 m (5 ft 9 in)
- Education: University of Modena
- Profession: Lawyer

Francesca Donato (born 25 August 1969) is an Italian politician who was elected as a member of the European Parliament in the 2019 European Parliament election in Italy, representing Lega Nord.

On 25 May 2024, her husband, Angelo Onorato, was found dead in his car in Palermo. Donato has claimed that he was murdered, while the police investigation is still ongoing.

== European Parliament ==
Donato was part of the Identity and Democracy group in the European Parliament, following her election in 2019. In September 2021, she was expelled from both Lega Nord and the Identity and Democracy group due to her stance against the EU Digital COVID Certificate, subsequently becoming an independent politician, and a non-inscrit member of the European Parliament.

On 2 March 2022, Donato voted against condemning the 2022 Russian invasion of Ukraine, joining 12 other MEPs in this position. Her Facebook page was closed in March 2022 after she shared news information identified as fake news.

Donato voted against the European Parliament resolution of 23 November 2022, which recognised the Russian Federation as a state sponsor of terrorism.
