= Gaetano Adinolfi =

Gaetano Adinolfi is a former Deputy Secretary General of the Council of Europe (1978–1993).

== Career ==
He was elected in 1978 and re-elected in 1983 and 1988. He was succeeded by Peter Leuprecht in 1993.

He attended the College of Europe 1950-1951 (Antoine de Saint-Exupéry Promotion).
