= Valentino Grant =

Italian politician (born 1964)

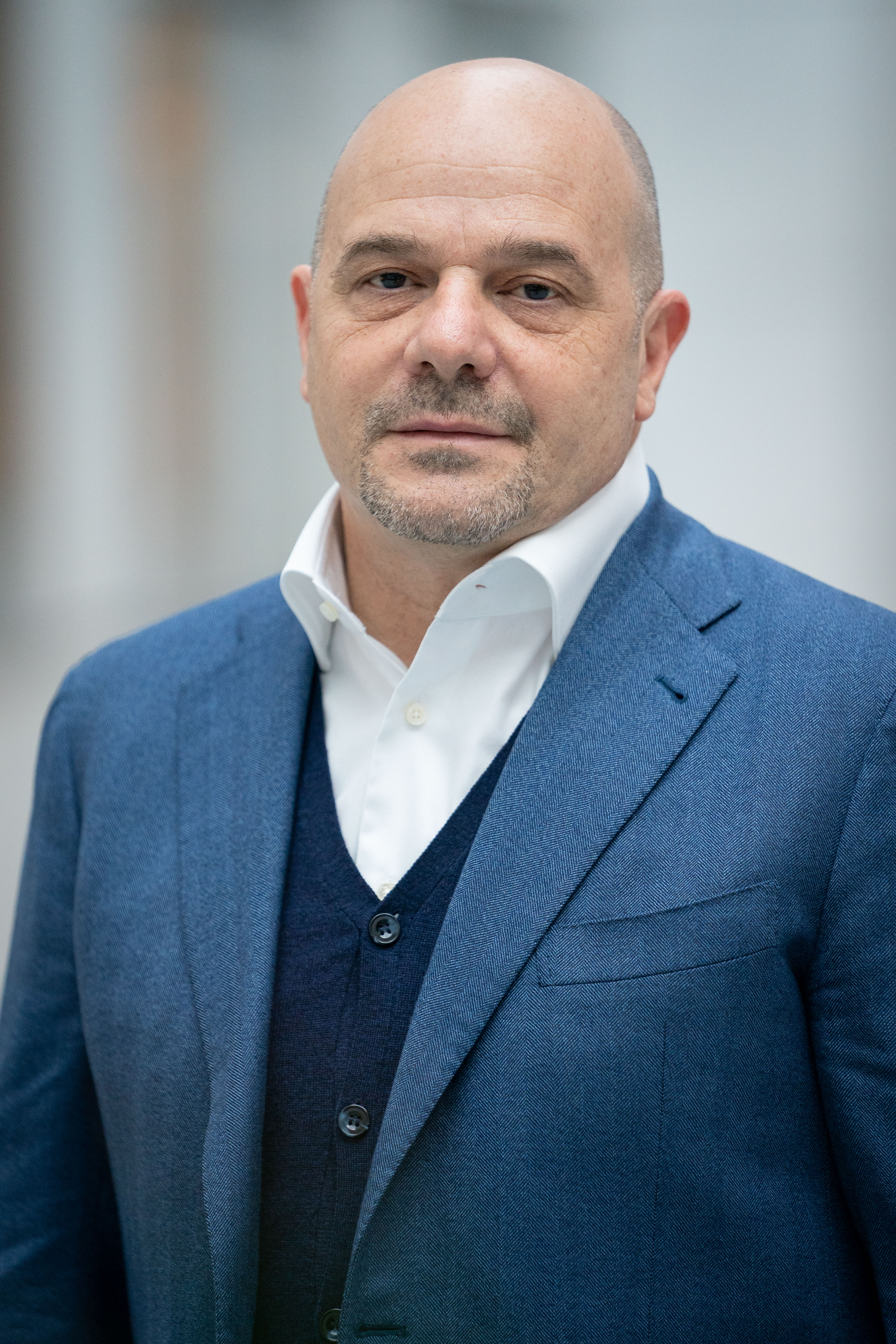

Member of the European Parliament for Southern Italy
- In office 2 July 2019 – 9 June 2024

Personal details
- Party: League
- Profession: Banker
- Website: www.valentinogrant.it

Valentino Grant (born 21 April 1964, Rome) is an Italian politician who was elected as a member of the European Parliament in 2019.

He is the President Board of Directors of Banca di Credito Cooperativo Terra di Lavoro San Vincenzo dè Paoli.
