= Antonio Maria Rinaldi =

Italian politician (born 1955)

Antonio Maria Rinaldi MEP
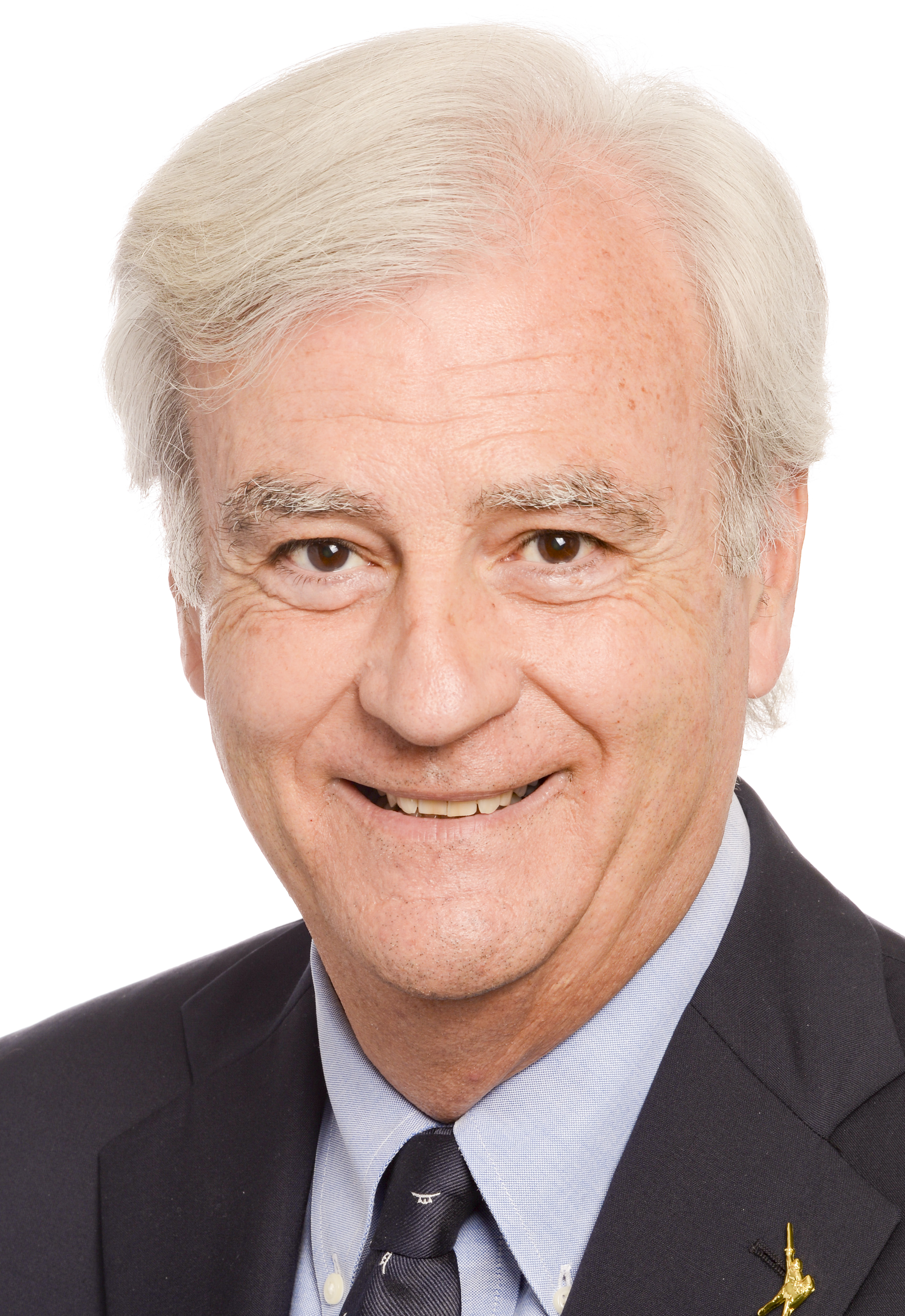
- Official portrait, 2019

Member of the European Parliament for Central Italy
- In office 2 July 2019 – 16 July 2024

Personal details
- Born: 27 February 1955 (age 71) Rome, Italy
- Party: FN (since 2026)
- Other political affiliations: Lega (2019–2026)
- Children: 2
- Education: Luiss Guido Carli
- Profession: Chairman of Trevi – Finanziaria Industriale S.p.A. (since 2025)
- Website: antoniorinaldi.eu

Antonio Maria Rinaldi (born 27 February 1955) is an Italian economist and politician. He has always expressed critical positions towards the euro as a single European currency. With a strongly Eurosceptic orientation, Rinaldi calls himself a post-Keynesian economist.

== Biography ==
Antonio Maria Rinaldi was born in Rome on 27 February 1955. His father was the banker Rodolfo Rinaldi, president of Banco di Santo Spirito, vice-president of Banca Nazionale del Lavoro and representative in Europe of the Chase Manhattan Bank, while his mother was the noblewoman Isabella Rossini, a distant descendant of the famous composer Gioachino Rossini.

He graduated in economics in 1979 at the LUISS University in Rome. He worked at various credit institutions, such as Banco di Roma, American Service Bank and Fideuram; he was also an official of the CONSOB and a manager at Eni (1986-1994). In 1994, he was a member of the board of directors of ENAV.

Rinaldi has been a student of Paolo Savona. He worked as a university professor from 2012 to 2018, and he taught political economy and corporate finance at the Link Campus University of Rome, the University of Molise of Campobasso and the D'Annunzio University of Pescara.

In 2019 he was elected MEP on the Lega's list, with 48,501 preference votes.

In May 2025, he was appointed Chairman of the Board of Directors of Trevi – Finanziaria Industriale S.p.A.
