= Lara Comi =

Italian politician (born 1983)

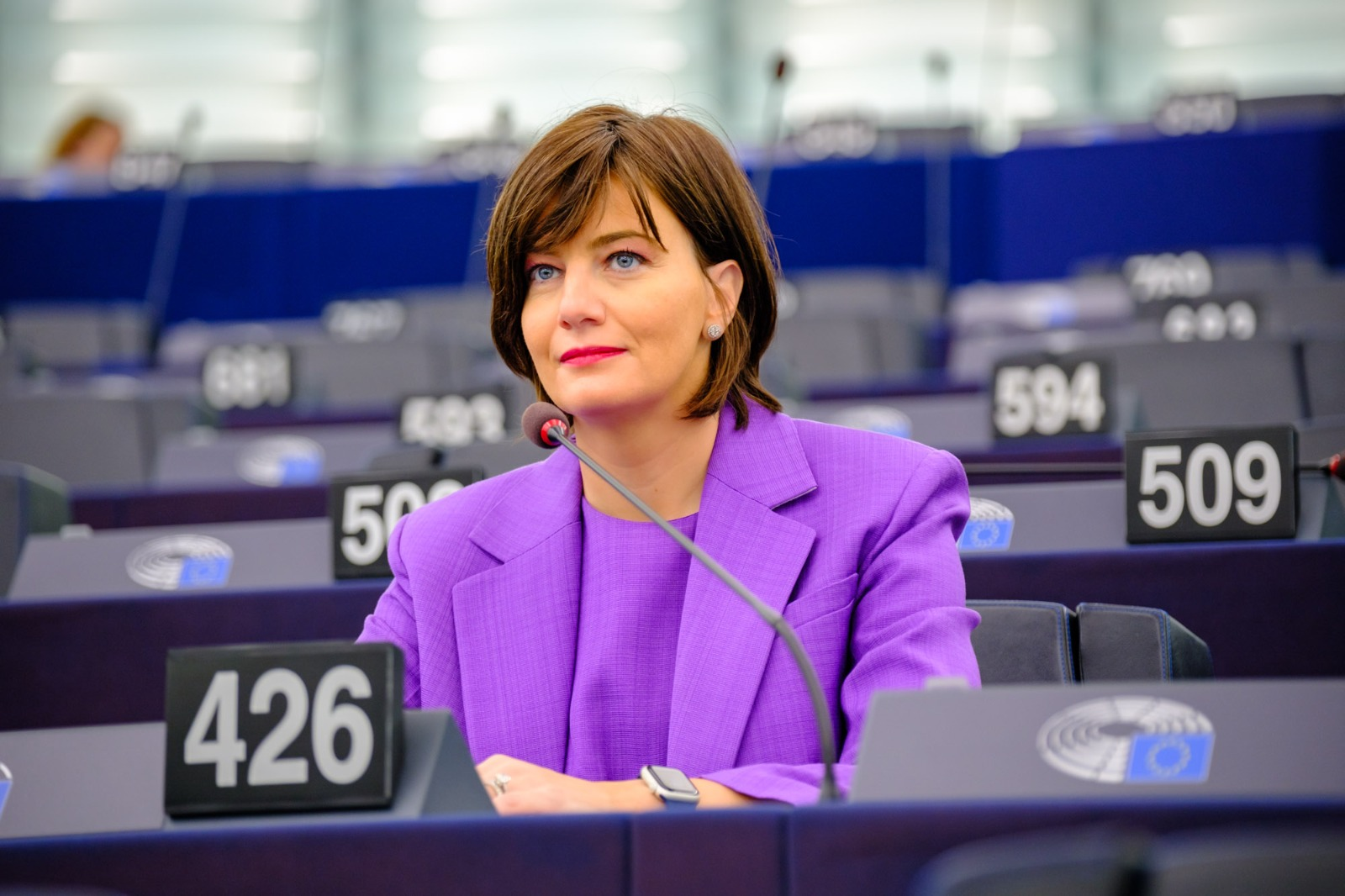

Member of the European Parliament
- In office 2 November 2022 – 15 July 2024
- Constituency: North-West Italy
- In office 14 July 2009 – 1 July 2019

Personal details
- Born: 18 February 1983 (age 43) Garbagnate Milanese, Italy
- Party: FI (since 2013); PdL (2009–2013); FI (2002–2009)
- Education: Università Cattolica del Sacro Cuore; Bocconi University

Lara Comi (born 18 February 1983) is an Italian politician. A member of Forza Italia, she was a Member of the European Parliament (MEP) from 2009 to 2019 and again from 2022 to 2024.

== Early life and education ==
Comi was born in Garbagnate Milanese on 18 February 1983. She studied at the Università Cattolica del Sacro Cuore in Milan, graduating in the management of international markets in 2005. Two years later she took a master's degree in the economics of business and international markets at Bocconi University.

== Early career ==
After university Comi worked as an assistant product manager at the cosmetics firm Beiersdorf from October 2007 to February 2008, and from 2008 as a brand manager at the toy company Giochi Preziosi. She came into politics as a Forza Italia activist in Saronno and worked as an assistant to Mariastella Gelmini, who later became Minister of Education. She was regional coordinator of the party's youth movement in Lombardy and stood as a candidate at the 2008 Italian general election.

== Member of the European Parliament ==
Comi was first elected to the European Parliament in 2009, aged 26, with 63,158 preference votes, and took office on 14 July that year. In the seventh Parliament she sat on the Committee on the Internal Market and Consumer Protection (2012–14) and on the delegations for relations with Afghanistan (2009–10) and Latin America (2010–14), and on the EU–Mexico Joint Parliamentary Committee (2010–14). When The People of Freedom dissolved in November 2013, she moved to the re-formed Forza Italia.

At the 2014 election she held her North-West Italy seat with 83,987 votes and became a vice-president of the European People's Party group in the eighth Parliament. Her term ended on 1 July 2019.

She returned to the Parliament on 2 November 2022, taking the seat that Silvio Berlusconi gave up when he chose to sit in the Senate. Back with Forza Italia in the EPP group, she joined the Committee on the Internal Market and Consumer Protection, the Committee on Industry, Research and Energy and the Committee on Agriculture and Rural Development. Her second term ended on 15 July 2024, with the close of the ninth parliamentary term.

== Legal proceedings ==
In 2014 Comi was found guilty of defaming a political rival, whom she had described on television as having a "mafia background". She was also sanctioned for employing her mother as an assistant in her parliamentary office, and repaid the sum.

In November 2019 Comi was placed under house arrest in the "Mensa dei poveri" ("soup kitchen") investigation, which examined alleged kickbacks and public appointments in the provinces of Milan, Varese and Novara. A first-instance court sentenced her to four years and two months in prison on 2 October 2023.

On 15 January 2026 the Milan Court of Appeal cleared Comi of corruption and of one of the two fraud charges, holding that the offence had not taken place. It cut her sentence to a suspended one-year term and a €500 fine, and convicted her only of fraud against the European Union budget over her local assistant's expenses; that money had been repaid in full.

The court's reasons, published on 16 June 2026, found no proof of a corrupt agreement and ruled that some of the chat messages on file could not be used as evidence. Comi said she would seek a full acquittal at the Court of Cassation.
