= Marco Campomenosi =

Italian politician

Marco Campomenosi MEP
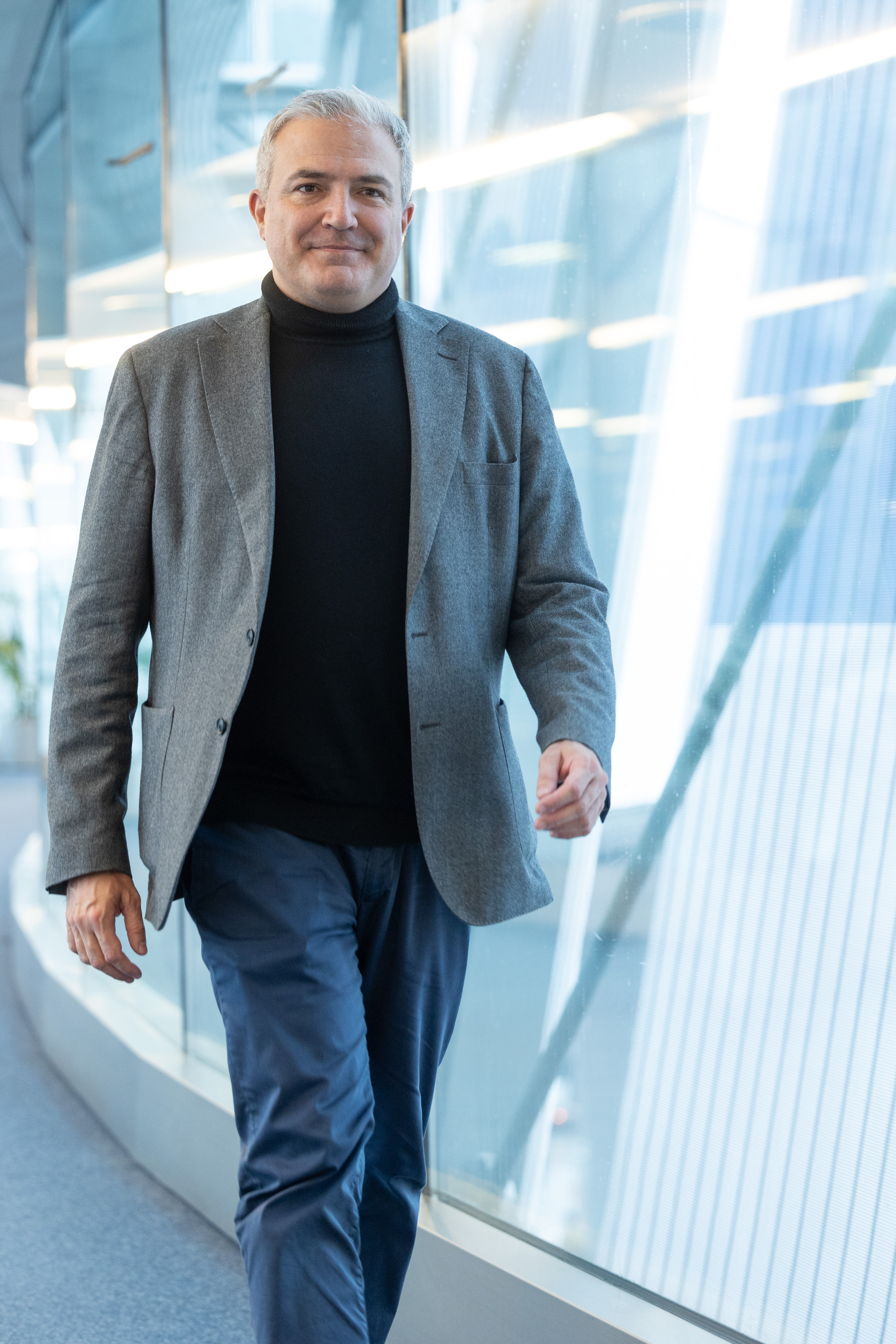

Member of the European Parliament for North-West Italy
- In office 2 July 2019 – 15 July 2024

Personal details
- Born: 2 September 1975 (age 50) Genoa, Liguria, Italy
- Party: League

Marco Campomenosi (born 2 September 1975 in Genoa) is an Italian politician who was elected as a member of the European Parliament in 2019.
