= Peace Land Dignity =

Political alliance in Italy

Peace Land Dignity Pace Terra Dignità
- Leader: Michele Santoro
- Founded: 14 February 2024
- Dissolved: 2025
- Ideology: Pacifism; Environmentalism; Soft Euroscepticism
- Political position: Left-wing
- Chamber of Deputies: 0 / 400
- Senate: 0 / 200
- European Parliament: 0 / 76

Website
- paceterradignita.it

Peace Land Dignity (Italian: Pace Terra Dignità, PTD) was a pacifist electoral alliance in Italy founded by journalist and television host Michele Santoro on February 14th, 2024, following the breakup of Unione Popolare, a left-wing to far-left coalition that had participated in the 2022 Italian general election. The list, which included three left-wing minor parties, was launched in September 2023 in Rome, with the aim of taking part in the 2024 European Parliament election in Italy. As of 2026, the alliance is de facto defunct, as the Communist Refoundation Party (the only somewhat structured party in the coalition) seeks to join the broader centre-left Campo Largo alliance.

== Composition ==
Parties	Main ideology	Leader(s)	Source
Communist Refoundation Party (PRC)	Communism	Maurizio Acerbo	
MERA25 Italia (MERA25)	Democratic socialism	Federico Dolce	
Territorial Equity Movement (MET)	Meridionalism	Pino Aprile	
Liberu	Left-wing nationalism Sardinian nationalism	Giulia Lai	
Dipende da Noi		Roberto Mancini	

== Leadership ==
=== Leader ===
- Michele Santoro (2023–present)

== Election results ==
=== European Parliament ===
Election	Leader	Votes	%	Seats	+/–	EP Group
2024	Michele Santoro	517,833 (9th)	2.21	0 / 76	New	–

== See also ==
- People's Union (Italy)
