= Sabrina Pignedoli =

Italian politician (born 1983)

Sabrina Pignedoli MEP
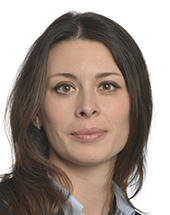

Member of the European Parliament for North-East Italy
- Incumbent
- Assumed office 2 July 2019

Personal details
- Born: 24 October 1983 (age 42) Castelnovo ne' Monti, Italy
- Party: Five Star Movement
- Education: University of Bologna; University of Modena and Reggio Emilia
- Profession: Journalist

Sabrina Pignedoli (born 24 October 1983) is an Italian politician and Member of the European Parliament since 2019.

== Biography ==
=== First years ===
Sabrina Pignedoli grew up in the province of Reggio Emilia, in Nismozza (today part of the municipality of Ventasso). She studied at the University of Bologna where she obtained a three-year degree in DAMS (Cinema Address) and a specialist degree in Cinema, Television and Multimedia Production.

Subsequently, she enrolled in the Master program in Journalism of the University of Bologna and presented a thesis on the role of the press in legitimizing the massacre of 2 August 1980. In the meantime, she was practicing at the editorial offices of regional news in Emilia-Romagna and the national newspaper Il Resto del Carlino. She has been a professional journalist since January 2010. She mainly collaborates with other national newspaper and ANSA.

=== Journalism ===
Since the beginning of her journalistic activity she has dealt with crime and judicial news and has come into contact with investigations on the expansion of the 'Ndrangheta outside Calabria. She has investigated its presence in the province of Reggio Emilia. In 2013, growing interest in families close to the 'ndrine led her to receive a phone threat from a man close to the gangs (definitively sentenced with a final judgement on 2018-10-24) Pignedoli immediately reported the incident to the police. For the courage shown at the occasion, she was awarded a certificate of Benemerita by Anita Garibaldi from the movement "A thousand women for Italy" .

She enrolled at the University of Modena and Reggio Emilia and, in 2015, obtained a second specialist degree in International Law and Economics. In October of the same year she released her first book "Operation Aemilia: Come una cosca di 'Ndrangheta si è insediata al nord", which earned her the Golden Eagle of the 2016 Estense Prize.

In May 2016 she moved to Rome where he studied for a Ph.D. in Communication, Social Research and Marketing, at the University of Rome La Sapienza. A collaboration began with the journalist Ambra Montanari, with whom she has investigated the expansion of the 'Ndrangheta in Germany.

Since March 2019 Pignedoli has been a part-time consultant to the Parliamentary Commission of Inquiry into the phenomenon of mafias and other criminal associations, including foreign ones, of the XVIII legislature.

=== Political activity ===
On 12 April 2019 Luigi Di Maio, political leader of the 5 Star Movement, proposed Pignedoli as a candidate in the North-East constituency in the European elections. An online vote by the members of the movement green-lighted her candidacy. On 26 May she was elected with 13,768 votes.

== Bibliography ==
- Operazione Aemilia: Come una cosca di 'Ndrangheta si è insediata al Nord. S. Pignedoli. Imprimatur, 2015. ISBN 978-8868303112
- Le mafie sulle macerie del muro di Berlino. A. Montanari e S. Pignedoli. DIAKROS, 2019. ISBN 978-8832176049
