= Matteo Adinolfi =

Italian politician

Matteo Adinolfi MEP
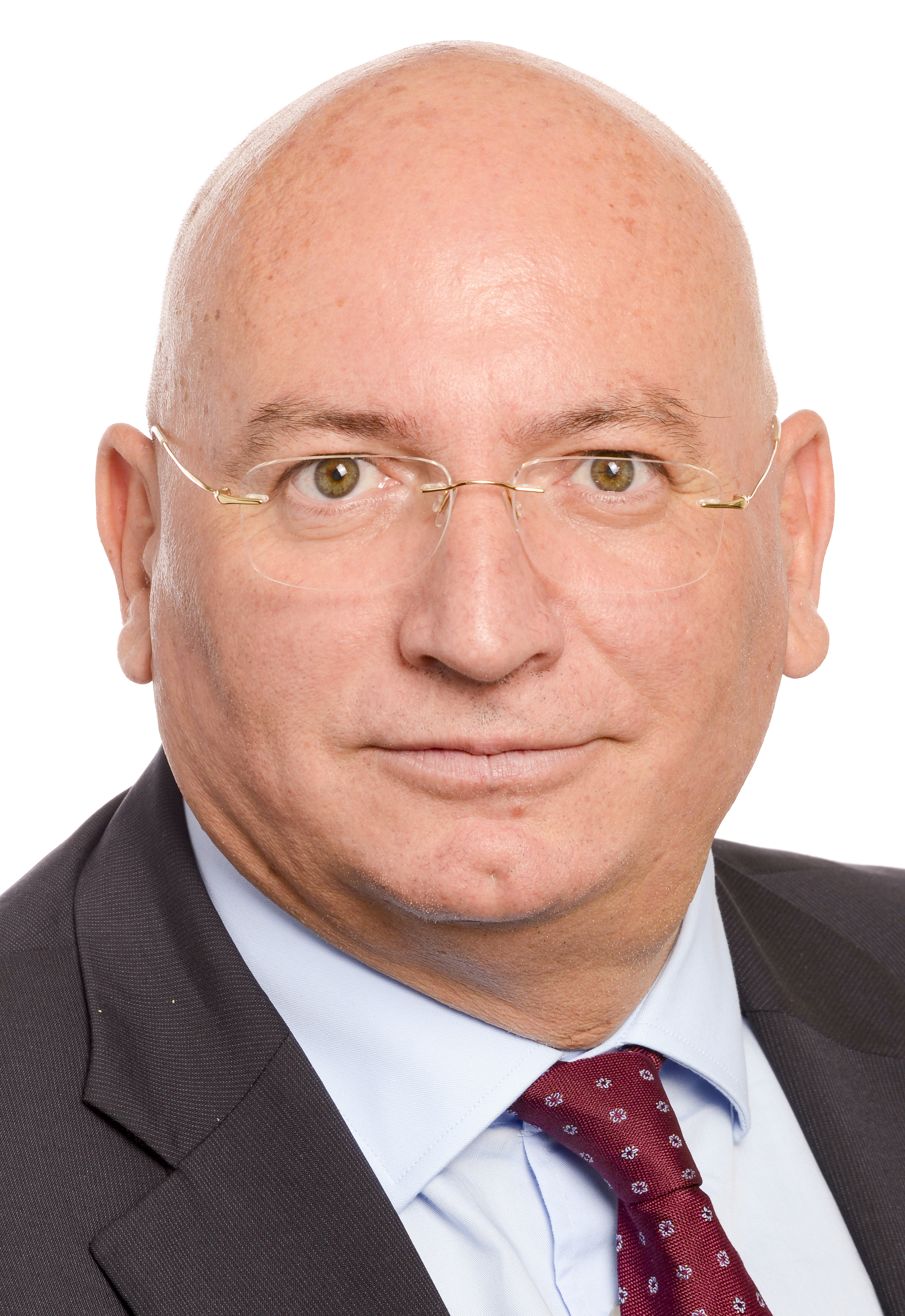

Member of the European Parliament for Central Italy
- In office 2019–2024

Personal details
- Party: Lega
- Education: Sapienza University of Rome

Matteo Adinolfi (born 24 December 1963 in Latina, Lazio) is an Italian politician currently serving as a Member of the European Parliament for the League.
