= North-East Italy (European Parliament constituency) =

Constituency of the European Parliament

- European Parliament constituency
- Location among the current constituencies

- Shown in Italy in red
- Member state: Italy
- Created: 1979
- MEPs: 13-15 (2009), 15 (2004), 16 (1999), 16 (1994)

In European elections, North-East Italy is a constituency of the European Parliament. It consists of the regions of Emilia-Romagna, Friuli-Venezia Giulia, Trentino-Alto Adige/Südtirol and Veneto.

As the other Italian constituencies, it has only a procedural goal to choose the elected MEPs inside party lists, the distribution of seats between different parties being calculated at national level (called Collegio Unico Nazionale, National Single Constituency).

== Elected MEPs ==
MEPs for North-East Italy (1979– )
Key to parties PCI PRC PDS / DS PD FdV VA PSI PSDI IdV PR LB SVP PPI DC UDC FI / PdL PLI AN LN FdI MSI
Legislature	Election	Distribution
1st	1979	5 / 2 / 1 / 1 / 1 / 6 / 1
2nd	1984	6 / 1 / 1 / 1 / 5 / 1
3rd	1989	5 / 2 / 1 / 1 / 1 / 5 / 1 / 1
4th	1994	1 / 4 / 1 / 1 / 1 / 1 / 5 / 2 / 2
5th	1999	1 / 4 / 1 / 1 / 1 / 1 / 4 / 1 / 1
6th	2004	1 / 5 / 1 / 1 / 1 / 1 / 3 / 1 / 1
7th	2009	4 / 1 / 1 / 1 / 5 / 3
8th	2014	6 / 3 / 1 / 2 / 2
9th	2019	4 / 2 / 1 / 7 / 1
10th	2024	1 / 5 / 1 / 1 / 2 / 5

== Election Results ==
Summary of the results of North-East Italy election to the European Parliament · 8–9 June 2024
National party	European group	Main candidate	Votes	%	+/–	Seats	+/–
Brothers of Italy (FdI)	ECR	Giorgia Meloni	1,577,056	31.82	▲	5 / 15	▲4
Democratic Party (PD)	S&D	Cecilia Strada	1,279,008	25.80	▲	5 / 15	▲1
Lega	ID	Roberto Vannacci	502,977	10.15	▼	2 / 15	▼5
Forza Italia (FI)	EPP	Antonio Tajani	347,314	7.01	▲	1 / 15	▲1
Greens and Left Alliance (AVS)	The Left; Greens/EFA	Ilaria Salis	337,505	6.81	▲	1 / 15	▲1
Five Star Movement (M5S)	NI		283,197	5.71	▼	0 / 15	▼2
Action (A)	RE	Carlo Calenda	188,442	3.80		0 / 20	
United States of Europe (SUE)	RE	Matteo Renzi	152,116	3.07		0 / 20	
South Tyrolean People's Party (SVP)	EPP	Dieter Steger	120,879	2.44	0	1 / 15	0
Peace Land Dignity (PTD)	The Left	Michele Santoro	111,524	2.25		0 / 20	
Others (parties and candidates that won less than 1% of the vote and no seats)			56,694	1.15	—	0 / 20	0
Valid votes			4,956,612				
Blank and invalid votes			220,693				
Totals			5,177,305	100.00	—	20 / 20	Steady
Eligible voters and turnout			9,810,626	52.77	▼		
Source: Italian Ministry of the Interior
