= 2025 Action (Italy) leadership election =

Congressional primary election

2025 Action leadership election
- 15 February – 30 March 2025
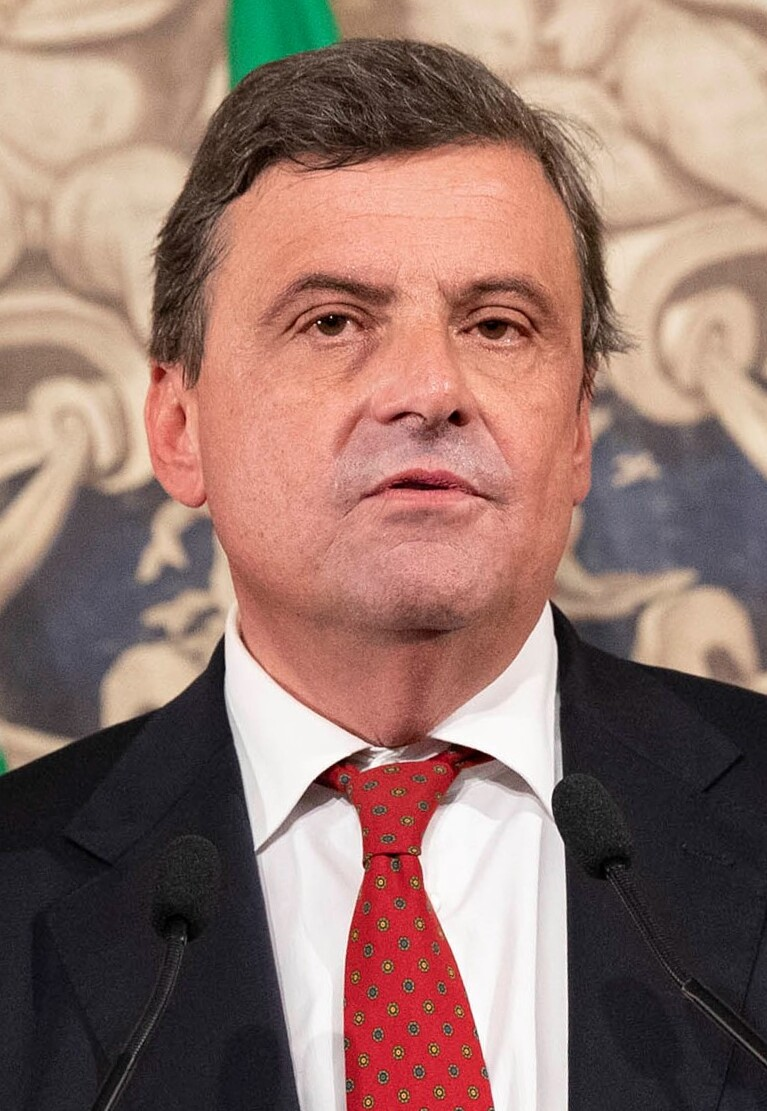

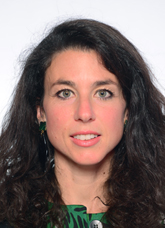
Candidate	Carlo Calenda	Giulia Pastorella
Percentage	85.7%	14.3%
Previous Secretary
Carlo Calenda
Secretary
Carlo Calenda

The 2025 Action leadership election was held from 15 February to 30 March 2025 to elect the leadership of Action.

Outgoing secretary Carlo Calenda was re-elected for a second term, defeating Giulia Pastorella by 85.7% to 14.3%.

== Rules and procedure ==
=== Timetable ===
Timetable of events for the 2025 Action leadership election
Date(s)	Event
31 December 2024	Enrollment for members closes.
15 January 2025	Publication of the delegate allocation tables.
31 January 2025	Submission of candidacies for secretary and their delegates' lists closes.
15 February 2025	Election of the secretary and Assembly members takes place.
29–30 March 2025	Convocation of the Assembly and the election of the president take place.

According to the Congressional Rules of Procedure, voting rights are granted to members of Action who have fulfilled their membership dues for either 2024 or 2025 by 31 December 2024, or to members from 2023 who renew their registration on 15 February 2025.

Candidates willing to run for the position of secretary must submit a manifesto supported by at least 5% of the active membership of the party and obtain the endorsement of at least 10 provincial delegate lists across a minimum of four regions. If no candidate secures more than 40% of votes on 15 February, the secretary will be elected by the Assembly through a run-off between the top two contenders before 31 March.

On 15 February, party members will also vote for the 300 members of the Assembly by voting for provincial delegate lists. If a coalition of delegate lists receives more than 40% of valid votes but fails to secure 270 seats in the Assembly, it is granted a majority bonus of 45 additional seats until the coalition reaches 270 members. The Assembly also includes the incumbent secretary, members of Parliament, regional councillors, and mayors of cities with populations exceeding 70,000 inhabitants, provided they met their membership dues.

== Candidates ==
=== Secretary ===
Portrait	Name	Most recent position	Campaign logo	Slogan	Announced	Refs
	Carlo Calenda (age 52)	Member of the Senate of the Republic for Action (2022–present) Other positions: Secretary for Action (2022–present); Member of the European Parliament (2019–2022); Municipal Councillor of Rome (2021); Minister of Economic Development (2016–2018); Permanent Representative of Italy to the European Union (2016); Deputy Minister of Economic Development (2013–2016)	(mozioneCarloCalenda2025-def.pdf)	Nati per correre (Born to run)	13 December 2024	
	Giulia Pastorella (age 39)	Member of the Chamber of Deputies for Action (2022–present) Other positions: Vice President for Action (2022–present); Municipal Councillor of Milan (2021–present)	(giuliapastorella.eu/mozione)	Dipende da noi (It's up to us)	21 November 2024	

=== Endorsements ===
Carlo Calenda

Senators

- Marco Lombardo

Former Senators

- Giuseppe Cucca

Deputies

- Fabrizio Benzoni
- Elena Bonetti
- Antonio D'Alessio
- Valentina Grippo
- Matteo Richetti
- Ettore Rosato
- Daniela Ruffino
- Giulio Cesare Sottanelli

Former Presidents of Regions

- Marcello Pittella (Basilicata)

Regional Councillors

- Salvatore Aversano (Campania)
- Sergio Bartoli (Piedmont)
- Luigi Cirillo (Campania)
- Sergio Clemente (Apulia)
- Francesco De Nisi (Calabria)
- Pasquale Di Fenza (Campania)
- Alessio D’Amato (Lazio)
- Giuseppe Graziano (Calabria)
- Ruggiero Mennea (Apulia)
- Nicola Massimo Morea (Basilicata)
- Enio Pavone (Abruzzo
- Giuseppe Sommese (Campania)

Former Regional Councillors

- Luigi Bosco (Campania)
- Giacomo Leonelli (Umbria)
- Marco Remaschi (Tuscany)

Municipal Councillors (only provincial capitals)

- Tommaso Fagioli (Ancona)
- Cristina Lodi (Genoa)
- Carlo Pasqualetto (Padua)

Former Municipal Councillors (only cities with less than 15,000 residents)

- Marco Bignotti (Étroubles, AO)

Other politicians

- Donato Pessolano (Regional Secretary for Action in Basilicata, 2019–present)
Giulia Pastorella

Deputies

- Federica Onori

Former Members of the European Parliament

- Fabio Massimo Castaldo

Municipal Councillors (only provincial capitals)

- Edoardo Arcidiacono (Milan)
- Giovanna Flor (Trento)
- Francesco Tomasini (Brescia)
- Adele Taramasso (Savona)
- Fabio Vittorini (Rome)
- Davide Varrà (Milan)

Municipal Councillors (only cities with no less than 15,000 residents)

- Tommaso Oliboni (Negrar di Valpolicella, VR)

Municipal Councillors (only cities with less than 15,000 residents)

- Marco Dessi (Pezzaze, BS)
- Davide Bassini (Roncadelle, BS)
- Artur Lastur (Poggio Renatico, FE)
- Luca Sergiampietri (Castelnuovo Magra, SP)

Municipal Assessors (only cities with no less than 15,000 residents)

- Fabrizio Zordan (Valdagno, VI)

== Results ==
Carlo Calenda was re-elected with 85.8% of the vote by party members. Giulia Pastorella won 14.28% of the votes and did not field her candidacy all over the country. Calenda was strong in the center and south of Italy, while Pastorella was particularly strong in northern Italy and with International party members.

Elena Bonetti was elected president by acclamation.

=== Secretary ===
Candidate	%
Carlo Calenda	85.72
Giulia Pastorella	14.28
Total	100.00
Source: Results

Vote by membership
Calenda	85.7%
Pastorella	14.3%

=== President ===
Candidate	
Elena Bonetti	by acclamation
Source: Video

=== Assembly ===
==== Delegates ====
Legend
	Calenda plurality of votes
	Pastorella plurality of votes
	Not a candidate in that constituency
—	The constituency did not hold any election

Constituency			Calenda			Pastorella			Invalid	Blank	Turnout	Source(s)
Region	Province or City	Delegates	Votes	%	Delegates	Votes	%	Delegates	Invalid	Blank	Turnout	Source(s)
Abruzzo	Chieti	2		100.0	2				—N/a	—N/a	—N/a	
Abruzzo	L'Aquila	2		100.0	2				—N/a	—N/a	—N/a	
Abruzzo	Pescara	1		100.0	1				—N/a	—N/a	—N/a	
Abruzzo	Teramo	2		100.0	2				—N/a	—N/a	—N/a	
Abruzzo		7		100.0	7				—N/a	—N/a	—N/a	
Basilicata	Matera	4		100.0	4				—N/a	—N/a	—N/a	
Basilicata	Potenza	7		100.0	7				—N/a	—N/a	—N/a	
Basilicata		11		100.0	11				—N/a	—N/a	—N/a	
Calabria	Catanzaro	4		100.0	4				—N/a	—N/a	—N/a	
Calabria	Cosenza	4		100.0	4				—N/a	—N/a	—N/a	
Calabria	Crotone	2		100.0	2				—N/a	—N/a	—N/a	
Calabria	Reggio Calabria	2		100.0	2				—N/a	—N/a	—N/a	
Calabria	Vibo Valentia	3		100.0	3				—N/a	—N/a	—N/a	
Calabria		15		100.0	15				—N/a	—N/a	—N/a	
Campania	Avellino	3		100.0	3				—N/a	—N/a	—N/a	
Campania	Benevento	1		100.0	1				—N/a	—N/a	—N/a	
Campania	Caserta	9		100.0	9				—N/a	—N/a	—N/a	
Campania	Naples	37		100.0	37				—N/a	—N/a	—N/a	
Campania	Salerno	8		100.0	8				—N/a	—N/a	—N/a	
Campania		58		100.0	58				—N/a	—N/a	—N/a	
Emilia-Romagna	Bologna	4	20	40.0	2	30	60.0	2	—N/a	—N/a	—N/a	
Emilia-Romagna	Ferrara	1	58	87.9	1	8	12.1	0	—N/a	—N/a	—N/a	
Emilia-Romagna	Forlì-Cesena	1				7	100.0	1	—N/a	—N/a	—N/a	
Emilia-Romagna	Modena	3	44	52.4	3	40	47.6	0	—N/a	—N/a	—N/a	
Emilia-Romagna	Parma	2	41	67.2	2	20	32.8	0	—N/a	—N/a	—N/a	
Emilia-Romagna	Piacenza	1		100.0	1				—N/a	—N/a	—N/a	
Emilia-Romagna	Ravenna	1	13	43.3	1	17	56.6	0	—N/a	—N/a	—N/a	
Emilia-Romagna	Reggio nell'Emilia	2	30	46.2	1	35	53.8	1	—N/a	—N/a	—N/a	
Emilia-Romagna	Rimini	1		100.0	1				—N/a	—N/a	—N/a	
Emilia-Romagna		16	223	58.7	12	157	41.3	4	—N/a	—N/a	—N/a	
Friuli-Venezia Giulia	Gorizia	0 (Note: Each province had to reach a quota of active party members to be able to elect delegates, but some of them failed to do so. Whenever the provinces meet the criteria, they will be able to elect their delegates in a by-election.)	—	—	—	—	—	—	—	—	—	—
Friuli-Venezia Giulia	Pordenone	1	14	60.9	1	9	39.1	0	—N/a	—N/a	—N/a	
Friuli-Venezia Giulia	Trieste	1	39	39.8	1	59	60.2	0	—N/a	—N/a	—N/a	
Friuli-Venezia Giulia	Udine	2		100.0	2				—N/a	—N/a	—N/a	
Friuli-Venezia Giulia		4			4	68		0	—N/a	—N/a	—N/a	
Lazio	Frosinone	2	29	54.7	1	24	45.3	1	—N/a	—N/a	—N/a	
Lazio	Latina	2		100.0	2				—N/a	—N/a	—N/a	
Lazio	Rieti	1		100.0	1				—N/a	—N/a	—N/a	
Lazio	Rome (city)	13		100.0	13				—N/a	—N/a	—N/a	
Lazio	Rome (province)	6	171	81.4	6	39	18.6	0	—N/a	—N/a	—N/a	
Lazio	Viterbo	1		100.0	6				—N/a	—N/a	—N/a	
Lazio		25			24	63		1	—N/a	—N/a	—N/a	
Liguria	Genoa	3	107	76.4	3	33	23.6	0	—N/a	—N/a	—N/a	
Liguria	Imperia	1	29	40.3	1	43	59.7	0	—N/a	—N/a	—N/a	
Liguria	La Spezia	1	23	52.3	1	21	47.7	0	—N/a	—N/a	—N/a	
Liguria	Savona	1	10	19.2	0	42	80.8	1	—N/a	—N/a	—N/a	
Liguria		6	169	54.9	5	139	45.1	1	—N/a	—N/a	—N/a	
Lombardy	Bergamo	3	32	46.4	2	37	53.6	1	—N/a	—N/a	—N/a	
Lombardy	Brescia	7	203	61.5	6	127	38.5	1	—N/a	—N/a	—N/a	
Lombardy	Como	2	18	46.2	1	21	53.8	1	—N/a	—N/a	—N/a	
Lombardy	Cremona	2		100.0	2				—N/a	—N/a	—N/a	
Lombardy	Lecco	1	50	82.0	1	11	18.0	0	—N/a	—N/a	—N/a	
Lombardy	Lodi	1	14	37.8	1	23	62.2	0	—N/a	—N/a	—N/a	
Lombardy	Mantua	2		100.0	2				—N/a	—N/a	—N/a	
Lombardy	Milan (city)	8	144	45.1	5	175	54.9	3	—N/a	—N/a	—N/a	
Lombardy	Milan (province)	6	54	42.2	4	74	57.8	2	—N/a	—N/a	—N/a	
Lombardy	Monza e della Brianza	3	62	69.7	3	27	30.3	0	—N/a	—N/a	—N/a	
Lombardy	Pavia	2	78	75.7	2	25	24.3	0	—N/a	—N/a	—N/a	
Lombardy	Sondrio	1		100.0	1				—N/a	—N/a	—N/a	
Lombardy	Varese	3	39	48.7	3	41	51.3	0	—N/a	—N/a	—N/a	
Lombardy		41	788	58.4	33	561	41.6	8	—N/a	—N/a	—N/a	
Marche	Ancona	2	31	53.4	1	27	46.6	1	—N/a	—N/a	—N/a	
Marche	Ascoli Piceno	1	12	30.0	1	28	70.0	0	—N/a	—N/a	—N/a	
Marche	Fermo	1				24	100.0	1	—N/a	—N/a	—N/a	
Marche	Macerata	1	59	73.8	1	21	26.2	0	—N/a	—N/a	—N/a	
Marche	Pesaro e Urbino	1	18	100.0	1				—N/a	—N/a	—N/a	
Marche		6	120	54.5	4	100	45.5	2	—N/a	—N/a	—N/a	
Molise	Campobasso	1		100.0	1				—N/a	—N/a	—N/a	
Molise	Isernia	0	—	—	—	—	—	—	—	—	—	—
Molise		1		100.0	1				—N/a	—N/a	—N/a	
Piedmont	Alessandria	1		100.0	1				—N/a	—N/a	—N/a	
Piedmont	Asti	0	—	—	—	—	—	—	—	—	—	—
Piedmont	Biella	1		100.0	1				—N/a	—N/a	—N/a	
Piedmont	Cuneo	2		100.0	2				—N/a	—N/a	—N/a	
Piedmont	Novara	0	—	—	—	—	—	—	—	—	—	—
Piedmont	Turin	9		100.0	9				—N/a	—N/a	—N/a	
Piedmont	Verbano-Cusio-Ossola	0	—	—	—	—	—	—	—	—	—	—
Piedmont	Vercelli	1		100.0	1				—N/a	—N/a	—N/a	
Piedmont		14		100.0	14				—N/a	—N/a	—N/a	
Apulia	Bari	4		100.0	4				—N/a	—N/a	—N/a	
Apulia	Barletta-Andria-Trani	5		100.0	5				—N/a	—N/a	91%	
Apulia	Brindisi	1		100.0	1				—N/a	—N/a	—N/a	
Apulia	Foggia	2		100.0	2				—N/a	—N/a	91%	
Apulia	Lecce	4		100.0	4				—N/a	—N/a	—N/a	
Apulia	Taranto	2	11	39.3	1	17	60.7	1	—N/a	—N/a	—N/a	
Apulia		18			17	17		1	—N/a	—N/a	86%	
Sardinia	Cagliari	2		100.0	2				—N/a	—N/a	—N/a	
Sardinia	Nuoro	2		100.0	2				—N/a	—N/a	—N/a	
Sardinia	Oristano	1		100.0	1				—N/a	—N/a	—N/a	
Sardinia	Sassari	1		100.0	1				—N/a	—N/a	—N/a	
Sardinia		6		100.0	6				—N/a	—N/a	—N/a	
Sicily	Agrigento	0	—	—	—	—	—	—	—	—	—	—
Sicily	Caltanissetta	1		100.0	1				—N/a	—N/a	—N/a	
Sicily	Catania	5		100.0	5				—N/a	—N/a	—N/a	
Sicily	Enna	0	—	—	—	—	—	—	—	—	—	—
Sicily	Messina	2		100.0	2				—N/a	—N/a	—N/a	
Sicily	Palermo	6		100.0	6				—N/a	—N/a	—N/a	
Sicily	Ragusa	1		100.0	1				—N/a	—N/a	—N/a	
Sicily	Siracusa	2		100.0	2				—N/a	—N/a	—N/a	
Sicily	Trapani	2		100.0	2				—N/a	—N/a	—N/a	
Sicily		19		100.0	19				—N/a	—N/a	—N/a	
Tuscany	Arezzo	1	36	52.9	1	32	47.1	0	—N/a	—N/a	—N/a	
Tuscany	Florence	4	95	57.6	4	70	42.4	0	—N/a	—N/a	—N/a	
Tuscany	Grosseto	2	79	69.3	2	35	30.7	0	—N/a	—N/a	—N/a	
Tuscany	Livorno	1		100.0	1				—N/a	—N/a	—N/a	
Tuscany	Lucca	2		100.0	2				—N/a	—N/a	—N/a	
Tuscany	Massa-Carrara	1	71	74.0	1	25	26.0	0	—N/a	—N/a	—N/a	
Tuscany	Pisa	2	24	50.0	1	24	50.0	1	—N/a	1	80.0%	
Tuscany	Pistoia	1				34	100.0	1	—N/a	—N/a	—N/a	
Tuscany	Prato	1				20	100.0	1	—N/a	—N/a	—N/a	
Tuscany	Siena	1	15	22.7	0	51	77.3	1	—N/a	—N/a	—N/a	
Tuscany		16	500	63.2	12	291	36.8	4	—N/a	10	—N/a	
Umbria	Perugia	3	159	75.4	3	52	24.6	0	—N/a	—N/a	—N/a	
Umbria	Terni	1		100.0	1				—N/a	—N/a	—N/a	
Umbria		4			4	52		0	—N/a	—N/a	—N/a	
Aosta Valley	Aosta	0	—	—	—	—	—	—	—	—	—	—
Aosta Valley		0	—	—	—	—	—	—	—	—	—	—
Veneto	Belluno	1	14	42.4	1	19	57.6	0	—N/a	—N/a	—N/a	
Veneto	Padua	4	102	65.4	4	54	34.6	0	—N/a	—N/a	—N/a	
Veneto	Rovigo	1	22	100.0	1				—N/a	—N/a	—N/a	
Veneto	Treviso	4	75	55.6	3	60	44.4	1	—N/a	—N/a	—N/a	
Veneto	Venice	3	67	52.8	3	60	47.2	0	—N/a	—N/a	—N/a	
Veneto	Verona	3	18	36.7	1	31	63.3	2	—N/a	—N/a	—N/a	
Veneto	Vicenza	3	14	14.3	1	84	85.7	2	—N/a	—N/a	—N/a	
Veneto		19	312	50.3	14	308	49.7	5	—N/a	—N/a	—N/a	
Trentino-Alto Adige/Südtirol	Bolzano	1		100.0	1				—N/a	—N/a	—N/a	
Trentino-Alto Adige/Südtirol	Trento	2	6	12.5	1	42	87.5	1	—N/a	—N/a	—N/a	
Trentino-Alto Adige/Südtirol		3			2	42		1	—N/a	—N/a	—N/a	
International		3	30	21.0	1	113	79.0	2	—N/a	—N/a	—N/a	
Total		292		85.7	263	1,911	14.3	29	—N/a	—N/a	—N/a	
Sources: Delegates, Candidates Delegates elected Delegates elected for Pastorella Results (only provinces where Pastorella ran) Congressional Committee report
