= Renziani =

- Leader: Matteo Renzi
- Other members: Maria Elena Boschi; Luca Lotti; Graziano Delrio; Lorenzo Guerini; Roberto Giachetti
- Founded: 2011
- Dissolved: 2019
- Merged into: Italia Viva
- Ideology: Centrism; Liberalism; Reformism; Third Way
- Political position: Centre to centre-left
- National affiliation: PD

The Renziani was a liberal faction within the Democratic Party (PD) composed of the followers of Matteo Renzi, party's former national secretary and former Prime Minister of Italy from February 2014 to December 2016. This area also took the name of Now! (Adesso!) and Big Bang. In September 2019, Renzi founded his own movement, Italia Viva (IV), exiting from the PD.

The Open Foundation, whose Secretary-General is Maria Elena Boschi, served as think tank and financial arm of the faction. It was later replaced by the Matteo Renzi Foundation.

== History ==
The faction, which has never been organised as a formal faction, grew around Matteo Renzi. Born in 1975, Matteo Renzi is a devout Catholic (he was a scout leader of AGESCI) and a centrist. He started his political career in the Italian People's Party (PPI), a Christian-democratic outfit, and was elected president of the Province of Florence in 2004, when he was just 29. Through The Daisy party he joined the Democratic Party in 2007 and was elected Mayor of Florence in 2009. A frequent critic of his party's leadership, especially under Pier Luigi Bersani, Renzi made his name as "scrapper" (of old leaders and ideas), advocate of complete change in the party, reformer and modernizer.

After organizing a convention of "scrappers" in Florence in November 2010, Renzi repeated the event in November 2011 under the Big Bang name. Leading Democrats who took part to the convention included Sergio Chiamparino, Arturo Parisi, Graziano Delrio, Ermete Realacci, Andrea Marcucci and Roberto Giachetti, but most of the speakers were people from the civil society, mainly entrepreneurs, artists and intellectuals. Among the ideas espoused by Renzi and his fellow Big-Bangers, many were genuinely liberal for a social-democratic party: labour market flexibility, abolition of professional bars, pension reform and cuts in public sector. This was seen as the platform for a Renzi's run for prime-ministerial candidate of the PD. Renzi's group was dubbed by some journalists as the party's "new right".

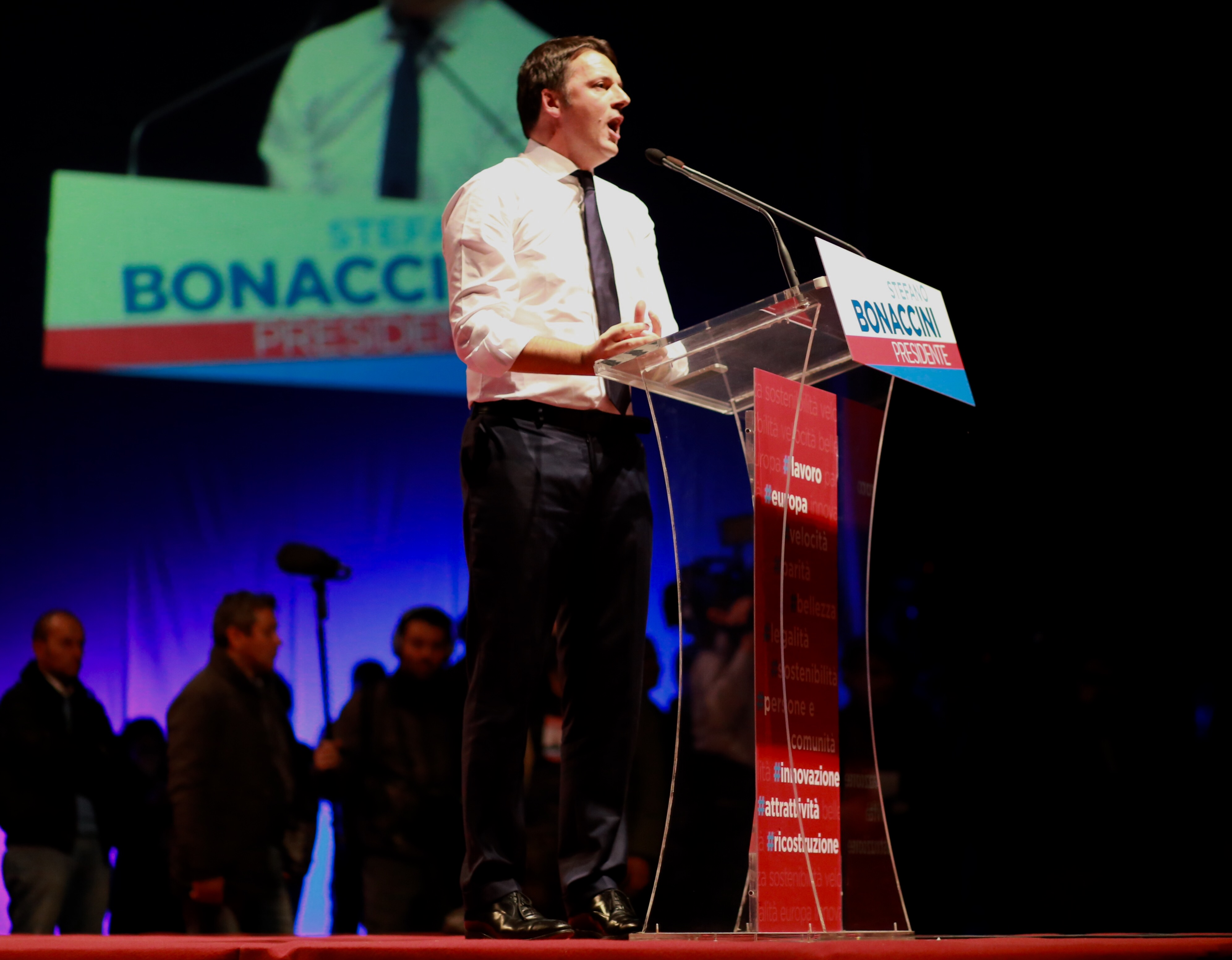
Matteo Renzi speaks during a Democratic Party's rally in Bologna

On 13 September 2012 Renzi officially announced in Verona, Veneto his bid to become the candidate for Prime Minister of the centre-left in 2013. On 25 November Renzi came second in the first round of the primary election with 35.5%, behind Pier Luigi Bersani (44.9%), but ahead of Nichi Vendola (15.6%), Laura Puppato (2.6%) and Bruno Tabacci (1.4%). In the subsequent run-off, on 2 December, Bersani trounced Renzi 60.9% to 39.1%, by winning in each and every single region but Tuscany, where Renzi won 54.9% of the vote. However, Bersani's demise as PD's secretary in April 2013 opened the way for another bid, this time for the party's leadership.

On 8 December 2013, during the open primary of party's leadership election, Renzi fended off the challenges of two rivals from the party's left, Gianni Cuperlo and Pippo Civati. He was elected PD leader with a landslide 67.6% of the vote. On 22 February 2014 Renzi was also sworn in as Prime Minister of Italy.

On 19 February 2017, during the PD National Assembly, Renzi resigned as Secretary of the party and announcing his candidacy for the next leadership election. Few days before he launched the movement In Cammino ("On the way"), in support of his candidacy.

After having won the vote by party members in March with almost 67% of votes, on 30 April, Renzi was re-elected Secretary of the party by a landslide with 69.2% of votes; while Andrea Orlando received 19.9% and Michele Emiliano 10.9% of votes. However, after the defeat in the 2018 general election, in which the PD gained only 19% of vote, Renzi was forced to resign as party secretary.

As of mid 2019 Renziani were divided in three official factions and associations, Reformist Base, Always Forward and Back to the Future. The latter two were closer to Renzi himself and would mostly follow him out of the PD.

On 17 September, during an interview to Italian newspaper la Repubblica, Renzi announced his intention to leave the PD, and create new parliamentary groups led by himself. On the same day, interviewed by Bruno Vespa during the late-night TV talk-show Porta a Porta, he officially launched Italia Viva (IV). Renzi was followed by 25 deputies and 12 senators, who left the PD to join his movement. However, not all the Renziani decided to follow him. Members of Reformist Base (BR), notably including its leaders Lorenzo Guerini and Luca Lotti, decided not to join the new movement, remaining within the PD.

== Leadership ==
Open Foundation

- President: Alberto Bianchi (2013–present)
- Secretary-General: Maria Elena Boschi (2013–2019)

== Factions ==
Before the foundation of Italia Viva in September 2019, the Renziani area was divided into three official factions and associations. While most of the Renziani in Always Forward and Back to the Future followed Renzi in Italia Viva, Reformist Base remained within the PD.

Factions	Ideology	Leaders	Founded	Dissolved	Merged party
Always Forward	Liberalism	Roberto Giachetti, Anna Ascani	June 2019	September 2019	Italia Viva
Back to the Future	Third Way	Ettore Rosato, Ivan Scalfarotto	October 2018	September 2019	Italia Viva
Reformist Base	Reformism	Luca Lotti, Lorenzo Guerini	May 2019	still active	Democratic Party

== Symbol ==
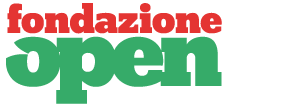
Open Foundation logo

In Cammino logo

== See also ==
- Italia Viva
