= Good Right =

Good Right Buona Destra
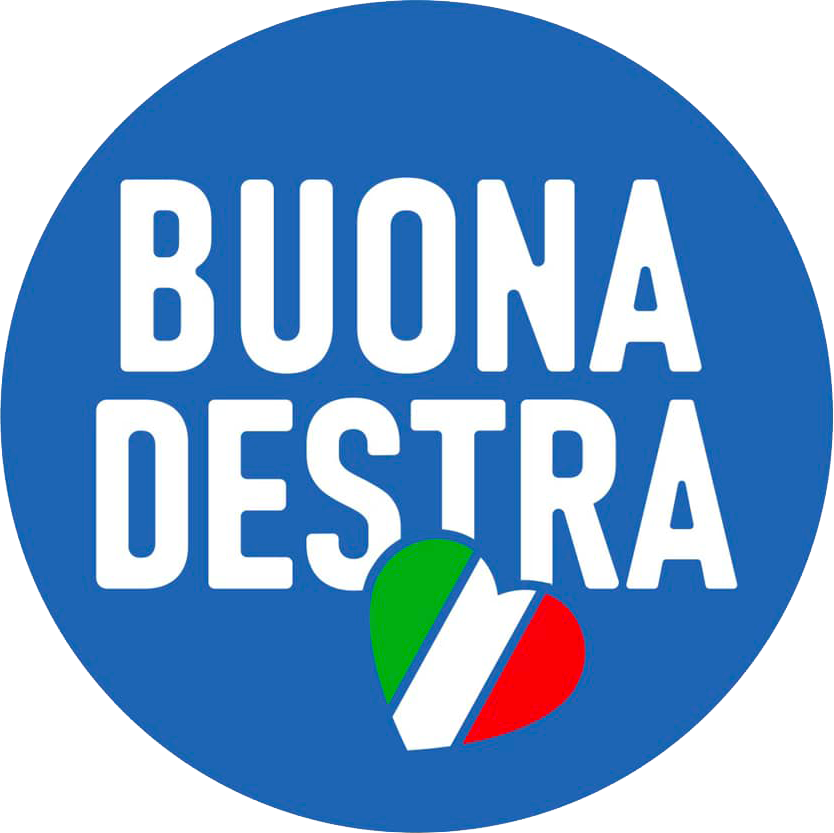
- Abbreviation: BD
- Secretary: Filippo Rossi
- Founded: 3 July 2020
- Dissolved: 15 May 2023
- Merged into: Action
- Headquarters: Via Giuseppe Ferrari, 35; 00195 Rome
- Membership: 5,000 (2021)
- Ideology: Liberalism; Pro-Europeanism
- Political position: Centre-right
- National affiliation: Action – Italia Viva alliance
- Colors: Blue

Website
- web.archive.org/web/20220119171946/https://buonadestra.it/

Good Right (Italian: Buona Destra, BD) was a liberal political party in Italy.

== History ==
The party was founded on 3 July 2020 by journalist Filippo Rossi, who was the editor of FareFuturo's web magazine between 2009 and 2011, and who published an essay in 2019 (On Jekyll's side: manifesto for a good right), in which he criticized the populist and sovereign drift of the Italian centre-right represented by Matteo Salvini and Giorgia Meloni. He compared his party to the moderate European parties, like the French The Republicans and the German Christian Democratic Union, for their firm stance against the eurosceptic parties, as he pointed out that in Italy instead the centre-right and the eurosceptics parties are allied. He stated his preference for the United States of Europe as the ultimate goal for the European Union.

In 2021 he supported Carlo Calenda's candidacy for the 2021 Rome municipal election and then he supported Roberto Lagalla's candidacy for the 2022 Palermo municipal election. For the 2022 Italian general election, Rossi decided to support Action and was a candidate for the Action – Italia Viva list.

On 15 May 2023, Good Right merged into Action.
