= Action – Italia Viva =

Electoral list

Action – Italia Viva Azione – Italia Viva
- Leader: Carlo Calenda
- Founded: 11 August 2022
- Dissolved: 19 October 2023
- Ideology: Liberalism; Pro-Europeanism
- Political position: Centre
- European affiliation: European Democratic Party
- European Parliament group: Renew Europe
- Colours: Blue

Action – Italia Viva (Italian: Azione – Italia Viva; A–IV), informally known as the Third Pole (Italian: Terzo Polo), was a liberal and centrist parliamentary group and electoral list which ran in the 2022 Italian general election. The list was led by Carlo Calenda. During the 19th legislature, it named its parliamentary group Action – Italia Viva – Renew Europe in the Chamber and the Senate.

== History ==
Following the resignation of Mario Draghi as Prime Minister of Italy and the call for a snap election, Carlo Calenda's Action (A) party signed on 2 August an alliance with Enrico Letta's Democratic Party (PD), the head of the centre-left coalition. On 6 August, the PD signed another pact with the Greens and Left Alliance (AVS), formed by Green Europe (EV) and Italian Left (SI), which had never supported Draghi's government. This caused tensions between Letta and Calenda. The latter, being a strong supporter of economic liberalism and nuclear power, considered impossible a coalition between his own party and the left-wing AVS. On 7 August, Calenda broke the alliance with the PD. On 11 August, Matteo Renzi's Italia Viva (IV) and A signed an agreement to create a centrist alliance led by Calenda, using IV's symbol to avoid the requirement to collect signatures for Calenda's party. Early August polls speculated that the formation of the Third Pole would not be influential in single-member constituencies but could cost the centre-left coalition votes in some competitive districts.

Despite Draghi's dismissal, Calenda and Renzi said they would push for Draghi to remain as prime minister, should they win enough seats. They also ran a pro-nuclear power and pro-regasification campaign as solutions for the ongoing energy crisis. In the general election on 25 September, the Third Pole obtained 21 seats in the Chamber of Deputies and 9 seats in the Senate of the Republic, having polled about 8%. On 3 October, Calenda announced that the two parties would form a joint parliamentary group in the next parliament and start a federation between the two movements.

Establishing a joint electoral list and parliamentary groups was supposed to be the first step towards forming a unitary Italian liberal party. A first constituent assembly held in January 2023 resulted in promising results, with the attendance of many figures from that area and the definition of a formal path towards the merger. However, increasing tensions between the two groups and their leaders about the structure and leadership of the proposed unitary party developed into a crisis in April 2023, leading a halt in the merger negotiations. Despite the crisis looking like a schism, the two parties managed to maintain the joint parliamentary groups. It was later announced that talks with other liberal movements were still underway towards the creation of a joint list for the 2024 European Parliament election involving Renew Europe, potentially including More Europe. However, in the following months, the two parties did not reach an agreement regarding the upcoming European election and, on 19 October 2023, Renzi officially announced the formation of IV's own parliamentary groups, marking the end to the Action – Italia Viva alliance.

== Composition ==
=== Founding member parties ===
Party	Main ideology	Leader
Action (A)	Liberalism	Carlo Calenda
Italia Viva (IV)	Liberalism	Matteo Renzi

=== Associate parties ===
Party	Main ideology	Leader
Christian Democracy (DC)	Christian democracy	Renzo Gubert
Good Right (BD)	Liberalism	Filippo Rossi
Italian Republican Party (PRI)	Social liberalism	Corrado De Rinaldis Saponaro
Liberal Democratic Alliance for Italy (ALI)	Liberism	Flavio Pasotti
Populars Europeanists Reformers (PER)	Christian democracy	Elena Bonetti
Social Democracy (SD)	Social democracy	Umberto Costi
Together	Christian democracy	Collective leadership

=== Regional partners ===
Party	Region	Main ideology	Leader
Popular Apulia (PP)	Apulia	Christian democracy	Massimo Cassano
Sicilian Socialist Party (PSS)	Sicily	Social democracy	Antonio Matasso

=== Parliamentary groups ===
Party	Main ideology	Deputies	Senators	Total MPs
Italia Viva (IV)	Liberalism	9	7	16
Action (A)	Liberalism	10	4	14
Populars Europeanists Reformers (PER)	Christian democracy	2	0	2
Totals		21	11	32

== Electoral results ==
=== Italian Parliament ===
Election	Leader	Chamber of Deputies					Senate of the Republic					Government
Election	Leader	Votes	%	Seats	+/–	Position	Votes	%	Seats	+/–	Position	Government
2022	Carlo Calenda	2,339,722	7.78	21 / 400	New	6th	2,213,957	7.73	9 / 200	New	6th	Opposition

=== Regional Councils ===
Region	Election	Candidate	Votes	%	Seats	+/–
Friuli-Venezia Giulia	2023	Alessandro Maran	10,869	2.75	0 / 48	New
Lazio	2023	Alessio D'Amato	75,272	4.9	2 / 51	New
Lombardy	2023	Letizia Moratti	122,356	4.3	3 / 80	New
Sicily	2022	Gaetano Armao	39,788	2.1	0 / 70	New

== See also ==
- Electoral list
- For the Third Pole
- New Pole for Italy
- Pact for Italy
- Renew Europe
- Third Pole (Italy, 2006)
- With Monti for Italy
