= Populars Europeanists Reformers =

Populars Europeanists Reformers Popolari Europeisti Riformatori
- Abbreviation: PER
- President: Elena Bonetti
- Founders: Elena Bonetti; Ettore Rosato
- Founded: 19 October 2023
- Dissolved: 29 January 2024
- Split from: Italia Viva
- Merged into: Action
- Headquarters: Via della Conciliazione, 10; 00193 Rome
- Ideology: Christian democracy Liberalism
- Political position: Centre
- Colors: Electric blue
- Chamber of Deputies: 2 / 400
- Senate: 0 / 200
- European Parliament: 0 / 76
- Regional Councils: 2 / 896

Website
- per-italia.it

Populars Europeanists Reformers (Italian: Popolari Europeisti Riformatori, PER) is a former Christian-democratic and liberal political party in Italy and is still active as an association and as a faction of Action.

== History ==
Following the breakdown of the alliance between Action and Italia Viva, Elena Bonetti announced her departure from Italia Viva on 10 September 2023, announcing the birth of a new party to work alongside Action, a party that would take up the values of the defunct Third Pole. On 22 September, the leader of Italia Viva, Matteo Renzi, commented on Bonetti and Ettore Rosato's departure, but Rosato retorted that he had not yet left Italia Viva and that Renzi was kicking him out of the party. Rosato therefore joined Bonetti's party. On 19 October, Bonetti and Rosato officially launched Populars Europeanists Reformers.

On 17 December, Raffaele Maria Pisacane, regional councillor for Campania and leader of Liberi e Forti – and former member of Democratic Centre – joined the party. He was followed on 27 December by regional councillor Pasquale Di Fenza, expelled from Democratic Centre on 14 December due to being in favour of Vincenzo De Luca's re-election for a third term, while CD was against it.

On 20 December, PER and Action held in Palazzo Madama a press conference to announce a federation agreement between the two parties. On 29 January 2024, Rosato and Bonetti officially joined Action.
