= Naike Gruppioni =

Italian politician (born 1979)

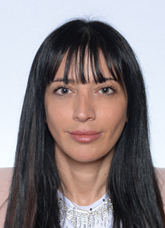
- Born: 25 January 1979 (age 47); Bologna, Italy
- Citizenship: Italy
- Occupation: politician
- Known for: Member of Parliament (Italy)
- Political party: Brothers of Italy

Naike Gruppioni (Bologna, 25 January 1979) is an Italian politician, serving as a deputy since 13 October 2022.

== Biography ==
Born on 25 January 1979 in Bologna, Gruppioni obtained a degree in Business Administration from the Luigi Bocconi Commercial University in Milan in 2004. She pursued an entrepreneurial career in various organizations, notably serving as the vice president of her family's company, Sira Industrie, from 2013 to 2022.

She is also the vice president of the Italy USA Foundation.

== Political career ==
Gruppioni entered politics ahead of the 2022 general elections, joining the ranks of Azione party. She was nominated as a candidate for that electoral campaign by the Azione – Italia Viva list in the single-member constituency of Emilia-Romagna – 06 and the multi-member constituency of Emilia-Romagna - 02 in the Chamber of Deputies. She was elected for the XIX legislature in the latter constituency.

In May 2023, she switched to Italia Viva and then in June 2025, crossed over to the Brothers of Italy.
