= Barbara Masini =

Italian politician

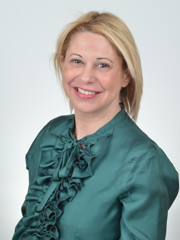
Barbara Masini in 2018.

Barbara Masini (born 22 January 1974) is an Italian politician who served as Senator from Tuscany in the mixed group as part of the More Europe–Action sub-group from 2018 to 2022.

In February 2022, Masini switched parties from Forza Italia to become centrist party Action's second senator.

== Biography ==
After graduating from the Niccolò Forteguerri Classical High School in Pistoia, she earned a degree in political science from the University of Siena and worked as a freelance graphic designer and communications specialist, focusing on visual communication.

In the 2017 local elections, she was elected as a city councilmember for Forza Italia in Pistoia, receiving the most votes of any woman in the center-right coalition supporting Mayor Alessandro Tomasi, and subsequently became chair of the 5th City Council Committee (Social Affairs and Health, Economic Development, Commerce, Youth Policy, and Equal Opportunity).

In December 2019, he was among the 64 signatories (41 of whom were from Forza Italia) for the confirmatory referendum on reducing the number of parliamentarians: a few months earlier, Forza Italia senators had walked out of the chamber during the vote on constitutional reform. In early January 2020, he withdrew his signature along with three other Forza Italia senators.

On July 15, during the 347th session of the Senate, he voted in favor of the Zan bill, breaking ranks with Forza Italia, and backed his vote with a speech that went viral due to its intensity and in which he came out as gay. This was the first time a sitting center-right politician had publicly come out as gay.

On February 2, 2022, he left Forza Italia and joined the mixed group, registering with the +Europa-Azione faction—which is Social liberalism in orientation—and joining the Azione party, which thus went from having a single senator, Sen. Matteo Richetti, to two.

In May 2024, during the European elections, she ran as a candidate in the Central Italy (European Parliament constituency) district on the Azione - Siamo Europei ticket.She received approximately 3,825 votes, achieving a solid result for her party, which did not meet the threshold.

On April 15, 2025, she announced in a statement that she was leaving Azione after being removed from her position as head of the civil rights committee by Secretary Carlo Calenda, citing the lack of a coherent political line and the strong tendency toward selfishness among the party’s leadership.

== See also ==
- List of current Italian senators
