= Harambee (Italy) =

- Leader: Matteo Richetti
- Founded: 8 April 2018
- Dissolved: 10 September 2019
- Ideology: Centrism; Social liberalism Christian left
- Political position: Centre-left
- National affiliation: Democratic Party

Website
- harambeeitalia.it

Harambee was a centrist and social liberal faction, with roots in the Christian left, within the Democratic Party (PD), a political party in Italy. Most of its members hailed from the Democracy is Freedom – The Daisy (DL).

The faction was formed in April 2018 by Senator Matteo Richetti, spokesman of the PD and close advisor of former Prime Minister and former party's secretary Matteo Renzi. On 8 April 2018, Richetti announced his intention to launch his bid to become secretary of the PD whenever a leadership election would be called.

The faction's name came from the Kenyan word Harambee, which is a tradition of community self-help events, for example fundraising or development activities; it literally means "all pull together" in Swahili, and is also the official motto of Kenya and appears on its coat of arms. Richetti said that he was inspired by his uncle, who was a missionary.

Richetti left the Democratic Party on 10 September 2019 and joined Action. Harambee was thus dissolved.
