= Federica Guidi =

Italian politician

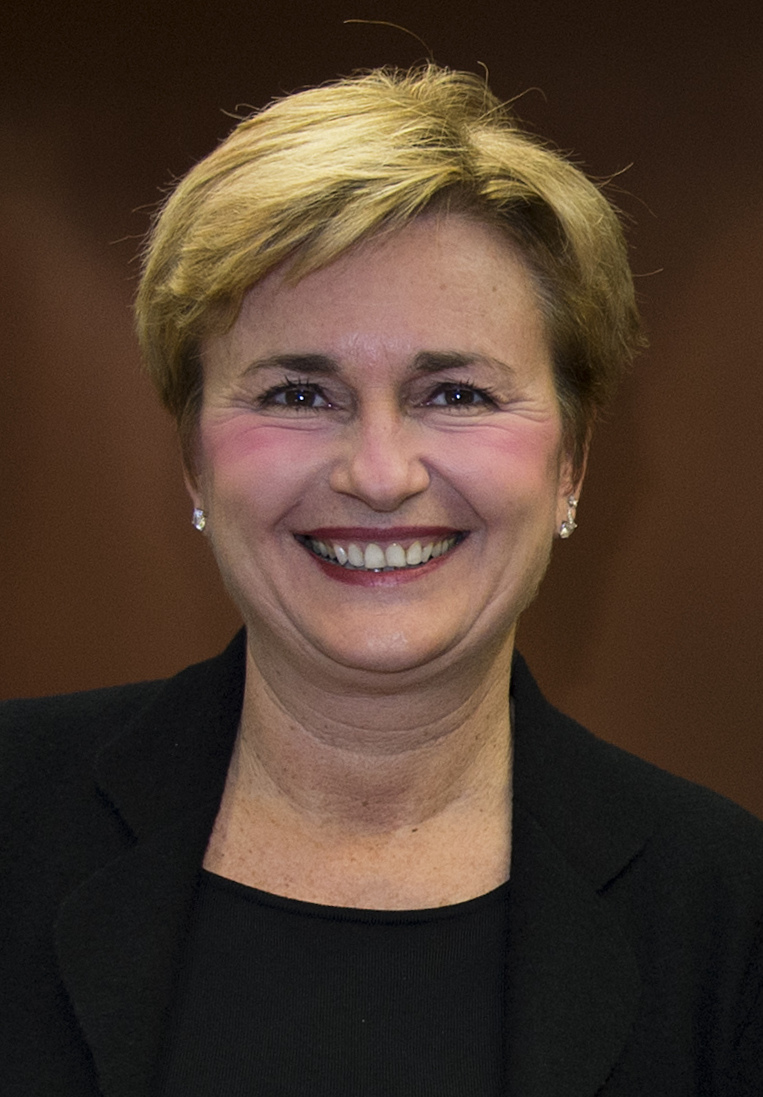

Minister of Economic Development
- In office 22 February 2014 – 5 April 2016
- Prime Minister: Matteo Renzi
- Preceded by: Flavio Zanonato
- Succeeded by: Carlo Calenda

Personal details
- Born: 19 May 1969 (age 56) Modena
- Relatives: Guidalberto Guidi (father)

Federica Guidi (born 19 May 1969) is an Italian businesswoman and the former Minister of Economic Development.

== Early life and education ==
Born in Modena, the daughter of the businessman Guidalberto, Guidi graduated in law, later working for two years as a financial analyst.

== Career ==
Leaving the financial career, in 1996 Guidi joined her family company, Ducati Energia, of which she subsequently became CEO. From 2002 to 2005, she was the regional president of the Young Entrepreneurs Association of Emilia-Romagna.

From 2005 to 2008, she joined Matteo Colaninno as the vice president of the Young Entrepreneurs Association of Confindustria, and at the end of this period, under the presidency of Emma Marcegaglia, she became the president. Then, following in the footsteps of his father, Guidi became vice president of Confindustria. In 2010, she became a member of the Trilateral Commission.

== Political career ==
In February 2014, Guidi was appointed minister of Economic Development. Following this appointment, in order to avoid potential conflicts of interest, she gave up all the operational positions she held in companies controlled by her family.

On 31 March 2016, Guidi resigned from her post following the disclosure of the transcripts of his fiancé's tapped phone. Guidi's partner, oil entrepreneur Gianluca Gemelli, is believed to have used his influence over her in order to help pass a piece of legislation that would have benefited him and his business partners. She was never formally accused of any wrongdoing and the investigation was closed without ever resulting in a trial.

== Other activities ==
- Leonardo, Non-Executive Independent Member of the Board of Directors (since 2020)
