= Enrico Borghi =

Italian politician (born 1967)

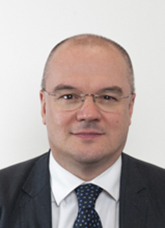
- Borghi in 2018

Member of the Senate
- Incumbent
- Assumed office 13 October 2022
- Constituency: Piedmont

Member of the Chamber of Deputies
- In office 15 March 2013 – 12 October 2022
- Constituency: Piedmont 2 (2013–2018); Piedmont 2 – 02 (2018–2022)

Personal details
- Born: 6 August 1967 (age 58) Premosello-Chiovenda
- Party: Italia Viva (since 2023)

Enrico Borghi (born 6 August 1967) is an Italian politician serving as a member of the Senate since 2022. From 2013 to 2022, he was a member of the Chamber of Deputies. He served as mayor of Vogogna from 1995 to 2004 and from 2009 to 2019. In September 2025, he succeeded Francesco Rutelli as President of the IED - Institute of European Democrats, the research institute of the European Democratic Party based in Brussels.
