= Nicola Danti =

Italian politician (born 1966)

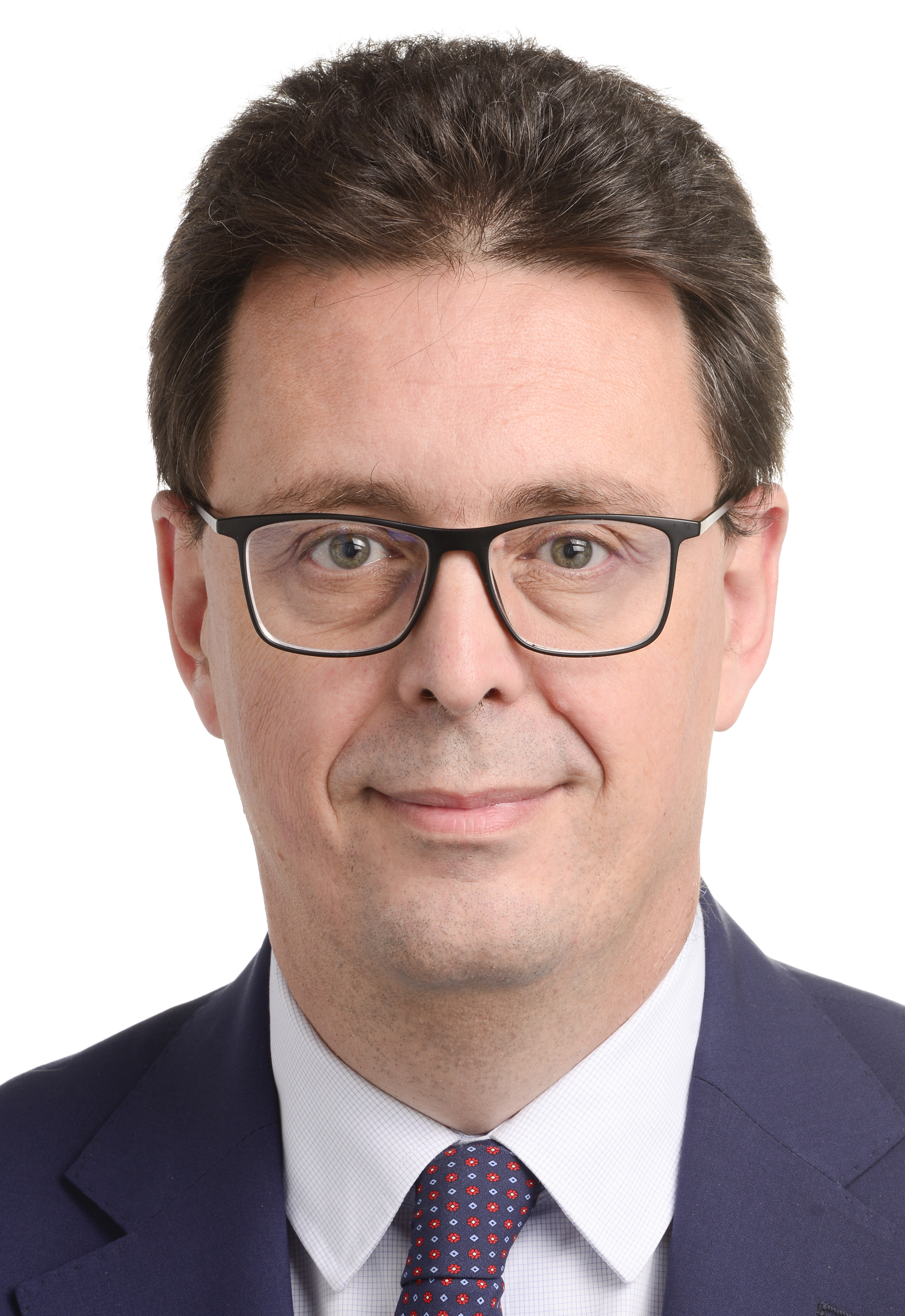
- Danti in 2019

Member of the Regional Council of Tuscany
- In office 24 July 2007 – 30 June 2014

Member of the European Parliament
- In office 1 July 2014 – 1 July 2019
- In office 5 September 2019 – 16 July 2024

Vice President of Renew Europe
- In office 19 October 2021 – 16 July 2024

Personal details
- Born: 6 September 1966 (age 59) Pelago, Province of Florence, Italy
- Party: Italia Viva (2019–present)
- Other political affiliations: Christian Democracy (1990–1994); People's Party (1994–2002); Democracy is Freedom – The Daisy (2002–2010); Democratic Party (2010–2019)
- Children: 3
- Education: University of Florence

Nicola Danti (born 6 September 1966) is an Italian politician who served – with a brief interruption – as a Member of the European Parliament from the 2014 elections until the 2024 elections. He is a member of Italia Viva (IV) and was the vice-president of Renew Europe in the European Parliament. He has been active in the politics of Tuscany since the 1990s. He has three children.

== Early life and career ==
Born in 1966 in Pelago, Danti graduated in Political Science at the University of Florence in 1993. He managed a consulting company until 2000. In his youth, he was a scout in the Association of Catholic Guides and Scouts of Italy (AGESCI). He has three children. He described his first 500 days as a member of the European Parliament in a book titled La strada da percorrere ("The way to go"), published in December 2015.

== Political career ==
Danti's political career started in 1990, aged 24, when he was elected to the Pontassieve municipal council as member of the Christian Democracy party, and later of the Italian People's Party. He soon became deputy-mayor of Pontassieve, from 1995 to 1999. From 1999 to 2004, he was again member of the municipal council. In 2002, he joined the Democracy is Freedom – The Daisy party and was also elected president of the Florentine Mountain Community, an office that he kept until 2008. He has been a member of several local authorities' associations. From 2004 to 2009, he served as municipal councilor for Pelago.

From 2004 to February 2007 he was coordinator of The Daisy for the area of Florence, succeeding Matteo Renzi.

Nicola Danti became a member of the regional council of Tuscany on 24 July 2007, with responsibility for agriculture and housing policies. He was re-elected in March 2010 in the Florence electoral district as member of the Democratic Party (PD). From 2010 to 2014 he was the president of the regional council's committee for education and culture. He was the first signatory of the regional law 70/09 “Interventions in support of the couples engaged in international adoption”.

During the center-left coalition primary election of November–December 2012, he was the coordinator of Renzi's committees in Tuscany. He was a member of the National directorate of the Democratic Party and the spokesman of the regional secretaryship of the party.

=== Member of the European Parliament, 2014–2024 ===
In April 2014, Danti was among the candidates of the Democratic Party for the upcoming 2014 European Parliament election in Italy, in the Central Italy district. With 80,100 votes, he came fifth of his list and was elected member of the European Parliament.

From 2014 until 2020, Danti was a member of the Group of the Progressive Alliance of Socialists and Democrats in the European Parliament (S&D). From 2014 until 2019, he served as the S&D group's coordinator on the Committee on the Internal Market and Consumer Protection (IMCO) before joining the Committee on International Trade (INTA) in 2019. He is also member of the Parliament's delegations for relations with Brazil and Mercosur. He was also a substitute member of the European Parliament's Committee of Inquiry into Emission Measurements in the Automotive Sector (EMIS).

Within the IMCO Committee, Danti served as rapporteur for the “market surveillance” Regulation, for the “Single Market programme” and rapporteur on two resolutions on the “collaborative economy” and on “professional services”. He was also shadow-rapporteur on the Network and Information Security (NIS) directive and as rapporteur for the opinion on the “Cybersecurity Act”; shadow-rapporteur for the opinion on the European Fund for Strategic Investments (EFSI); rapporteur for the opinion on the possible extension of EU geographical indication protection to non-agricultural products; standing shadow rapporteur on the EU-Mercosur Association agreement.

In addition to his committee assignments, Danti is a member of the European Parliament Intergroup on Fighting against Poverty, and the European Parliament Intergroup on Integrity (Transparency, Anti-Corruption and Organized Crime) He has also been committed to the protection of the "Made in" productions and in favour of the TTIP (Transatlantic Trade and Investment Partnership) resolution.

In October 2019, Danti announced he would leave the Democratic Party in favor of Italia Viva. Shortly after, in February 2020, he announced that he would move to the group of Renew Europe in the European Parliament. In December, he joined the European Democratic Party, which makes up a part of Renew. In October 2021, Danti was elected vice-president of the Renew Europe Group in the European Parliament.

In May 2024, he announced that he would not stand in the 2024 European Parliament election in Italy, stating that he had no chance of being elected due to IV's own leader, Matteo Renzi, running to become an MEP and becoming the main candidate of IV.
