= Italia Viva =

Italian political party

- Abbreviation: IV
- President: Matteo Renzi
- Coordinator: Raffaella Paita
- Founded: 18 September 2019; 7 years ago
- Split from: Democratic Party
- Headquarters: Via della Colonna Antonina 52, Rome
- Membership (2023): 23,144
- Ideology: Liberalism (Italy)
- Political position: Centre to centre-left
- National affiliation: Action – Italia Viva (2022–2023); United States of Europe (2024); Centre-left coalition (since 2024)
- European affiliation: European Democratic Party
- European Parliament group: Renew Europe (2019–2024)
- Colours: Fuchsia
- Chamber of Deputies: 7 / 400
- Senate: 8 / 205
- European Parliament (Note: One party member, Sandro Gozi, serves as MEP for France, representing the Democratic Movement and the Ensemble coalition.): 0 / 76
- Regional Councils: 11 / 896
- Conference of Regions: 0 / 21

Website
- italiaviva.it

Italia Viva (lit. 'Italy Alive', IV) is a liberal political party in Italy founded in September 2019. The party is led by Matteo Renzi, a former Prime Minister of Italy and former secretary of the Democratic Party (PD). As of 2021, Italia Viva is a member of the European Democratic Party.

== History ==
=== Background ===
Matteo Renzi started his political career in the Italian People's Party (PPI), a Christian-democratic party, and was elected president of the Province of Florence in 2004. Through Democracy is Freedom – The Daisy, the PPI's successor, he joined the centre-left Democratic Party (PD) in 2007 and was elected Mayor of Florence in 2009. A frequent critic of party leadership, especially under Pier Luigi Bersani, Renzi made his name as il Rottamatore (lit. 'the Scrapper' or lit. 'the Demolisher') of old leaders and ideas, for his advocacy of complete change in the party, as well as a reformer and a moderniser. His followers were known as Renziani.

Speculations over a new party led by Renzi date back to 2012, when he was defeated by Bersani in the run-off of the centre-left primary election. Rumors stopped when Renzi was elected secretary of the PD in December 2013. He also became Prime Minister in February 2014. He led the party to huge electoral success in the 2014 European Parliament election (40.8%), but badly lost the 2016 Italian constitutional referendum (59.1% to 40.9%), which caused his resignation as Prime Minister.

After the PD's defeat in the 2018 general election, in which the PD only won 18.7% of vote, forcing Renzi to resign as secretary, rumours of a split emerged. In March 2019, Nicola Zingaretti, a social democrat and a prominent member of the party's left wing who had roots in the Italian Communist Party, won the leadership election by a landslide, defeating Maurizio Martina (Renzi's former deputy secretary) and Roberto Giachetti (supported by most Renziani). Zingaretti focused his campaign on a clear contrast with Renzi's policies and, according to pundits, his victory opened the way for a major shift in the character of the Democratic Party.

In August 2019, tensions grew within the coalition supporting Giuseppe Conte's first government, leading to a motion of no-confidence by the League. Despite having opposed it in the past, Renzi advocated the formation of a new government between the PD and the populist Five Star Movement (M5S). After days of tensions within the PD, on 28 August, Zingaretti announced his support for a new government with the M5S, led by Conte. The Conte II Cabinet was sworn in on 5 September, and Renzi was seen by many as the real kingmaker of the new parliamentary majority.

=== Foundation ===
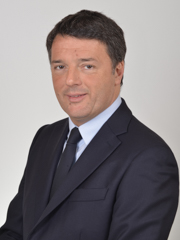
Matteo Renzi in 2018

On 16 September, in an interview to la Repubblica, Renzi announced his intention to leave the PD and create new parliamentary groups. On the same day, interviewed by Bruno Vespa during the late-night TV talk-show Porta a Porta, he officially launched Italia Viva. In the interview he also confirmed his support for Conte's government. Renzi was initially followed by 24 deputies and 12 senators from the PD, notably including Maria Elena Boschi, Roberto Giachetti, Teresa Bellanova (Minister of Agriculture) and Elena Bonetti (Minister of Family and Equal Opportunities). Three more senators, Donatella Conzatti, Riccardo Nencini and Gelsomina Vono, joined respectively from Forza Italia (FI), the Italian Socialist Party (PSI) and M5S, while one deputy, Gabriele Toccafondi, joined from Popular Civic List (CP).

The split was condemned by the PD's leadership: Zingaretti described it as a "mistake", while Dario Franceschini called it a "big problem". Beppe Grillo, founder of the M5S, described Renzi's actions as "an act of narcissism". Prime Minister Conte declared his perplexity too, saying that Renzi "should have informed [him] before the birth of the government". Additionally, Il Foglio revealed that internet domains italiaviva.eu and italiaviva.org were created on 9 August 2019, hinting that the split had been prepared in advance. The following day, la Repubblica revealed that the domains were bought by Alessandro Risso, a former member of Christian Democracy and the PPI from Piedmont. However, Risso explained that his moves had nothing to do with Renzi, whom he opposed.

Italia Viva's backbone was largely based on the Committees of Civil Action of Back to the Future, launched by Renzi during the 2018 Leopolda convention in Florence and seen by some people as the initial step of a new party. Ettore Rosato, the organiser of the committees, and Bellanova were appointed party's coordinators.

In October, during the Leopolda annual convention, the logo of IV was unveiled. It featured a stylised seagull and was chosen by supporters in an online vote.

=== Road to the 2022 general election ===
In February, Nicola Danti, IV member and MEP, left the Progressive Alliance of Socialists and Democrats group and joined the Renew Europe group. A few days before, Sandro Gozi, a former member of the PD's national board who later joined IV, had been sworn in as member of the European Parliament for France (elected with Renaissance list, formed largely by members of La République En Marche) and became the party's second MEP.

In January 2021, IV withdrew its support for Conte's second government, triggering a political crisis. Conte subsequently won confidence motions in both houses of Parliament, with the abstention of IV, but could only reach a plurality in the Senate, rather than an absolute majority. In the wake of this, Conte tendered his resignation to President Mattarella, who then began a round of discussions with various parties to form a new government. Consequently, IV was instrumental in the formation of Mario Draghi's government, in which minister Bonetti was confirmed.

In December 2021, IV joined the European Democratic Party.

In December 2022, Renzi was elected president of the party, replacing Rosato and Bellanova.

=== 2022 general election and aftermath ===
In the run-up of the 2022 general election, the party, which refused to join, or was refused entry to, the PD-led centre-left coalition, joined forces with the National Civic List (put forward by Federico Pizzarotti of Italia in Comune and Piercamillo Falasca of L'Italia c'è) and the Italian Republican Party (PRI). Most importantly, IV formed a joint electoral list with Carlo Calenda's Action. The joint list obtained 7.8% of the vote.

After the election, Renzi frequently clashed with Calenda, leaving the alliance's future uncertain. The party continued to achieve high-profile recruits, notably including senator Enrico Borghi from the PD, deputies Naike Gruppioni and Isabella De Monte from Action and senator Dafne Musolino from South calls North. In September 2023, Renzi announced that IV would run in the 2024 European Parliament election within a brand new coalition/list named "The Centre". This led Elena Bonetti to leave the party in order to seek an alternative alliance with Action. Also Ettore Rosato was critical and seemed interested in joining Action, but, before leaving the party, he was expelled by Renzi. Subsequently, Bonetti and Rosato launched Populars Europeanists Reformers and, in January 2024, joined Action.

In October 2023, the party held its first national congress, during which Renzi was re-elected president.

In March 2024, the party dropped the idea of "The Centre" list in favour of a broader, liberal and pro-Europeanist list named "United States of Europe", which included also More Europe, the Italian Radicals, the Italian Socialist Party and the European Liberal Democrats, in order to overcome the 4% electoral threshold. In late April, the list was also joined by L'Italia c'è.

=== Back with the centre-left coalition ===
Logo of the Reformist House

During the summer of 2024 Renzi re-positioned his party within the centre-left coalition. As a result, Luigi Marattin left the party and formed an association named Liberal Horizons, that would be merged into the larger Liberal Democratic Party in March 2025. Also in March, senator Annamaria Furlan left the PD and switched to IV. For the 2025 membership campaign, Renzi choose as party icon Alcide De Gasperi, the former Christian Democratic leader and Prime Minister who once said that he aimed at a "centre looking left".

In September 2025 Renzi launched "Reformist House" as a new political umbrella for IV and other liberal and centrist forces. The project was introduced with a new logo for the 2025 regional elections. Renzi described it as a political space intended to balance the left-leaning branches of the coalition and to help the centre-left win future general elections. IV-sponsored lists obtained 8.9% of the vote in Tuscany, 5.9% in Campania, 4.4% in Calabria, 2.1% in Veneto and 1.9% in Marche.

In May 2026 Marianna Madia, a former minister, left the PD in order to sit, as an independent, with IV in the Chamber of Deputies.

== Ideology ==
Italia Viva is considered a liberal and reformist party. Its "Charter of Values", presented in October 2019, referred to republican and anti-fascist values expressed in the Constitution of Italy, as well as in the Charter of Fundamental Rights of the European Union and the Universal Declaration of Human Rights. The movement also emphasised the principle of gender equality, the relaunch of globalisation and a strong opposition to all forms of protectionism and souverainism. It also supported a more incisive European political and economic integration, with the direct election of the President of the European Commission and the introduction of transnational lists.

Renzi described his party as a "young, innovative and feminist house, where new ideas for Italy and Europe are launched." Additionally, Renzi has likened IV to Emmanuel Macron's La République En Marche! (REM).

== Election results ==
=== Italian Parliament ===
Election	Leader	Chamber of Deputies					Senate of the Republic					Government
Election	Leader	Votes	%	Seats	+/–	Position	Votes	%	Seats	+/–	Position	Government
2022	Matteo Renzi	Into A–IV		9 / 400	New	6th	Into A–IV		5 / 200	New	6th	Opposition

=== European Parliament ===
Election	Leader	Votes	%	Seats	+/–	EP Group
2024	Matteo Renzi	Into USE		0 / 76	New	–

=== Regional Councils ===
Region	Election year	Votes	%	Seats	+/−	Status in legislature
Aosta Valley	2025	Didn't participate		0 / 35	–	No seats
Lombardy	2023	Into Action – Italia Viva		2 / 80	▲2	Opposition
Veneto	2020	In a joint list with Azione and More Europa		0 / 51	–	No seats
Friuli-Venezia Giulia	2023	Into Action – Italia Viva		0 / 48	–	No seats
Emilia-Romagna	2024	Into De Pascale list		0 / 50	▼1	No seats
Liguria	2020	In a joint list with More Europe and PSI		0 / 41	–	No seats
Tuscany	2025	In a joint list with More Europe, Action, PRI and PSI		2 / 41	–	Majority
Lazio	2023	Into Action – Italia Viva		2 / 51	▲2	Opposition
Apulia	2020	18,025 (14th)	1.1	0 / 51	–	No seats
Campania	2025	116,963 (7th)	5.82	3 / 41	▼1	Majority
Sicily	2022	Into Action – Italia Viva		0 / 70	–	No seats

== Leadership ==
- President: Ettore Rosato and Teresa Bellanova (2019–2022), Matteo Renzi (2022–present)
- Vice President: Enrico Borghi (2025–present), Davide Faraone (2025–present)
- Coordinator: Raffaella Paita (2023–present)
- Party leader in the Chamber of Deputies: Maria Elena Boschi (2019–2022), Mauro Del Barba (2022–2023), Davide Faraone (2023–2025), Maria Elena Boschi (2025–present)
- Party leader in the Senate: Davide Faraone (2019–2022), Raffaella Paita (2022–2023), Enrico Borghi (2023–2025), Raffaella Paita (2025–present)
- Party leader in the European Parliament: Nicola Danti (2019–2024), Sandro Gozi (2024–present)

== See also ==
- Back to the Future (Italy)
- Reformist Base
- Renziani
