= Fabrizio Benzoni =

Italian politician (born 1985)

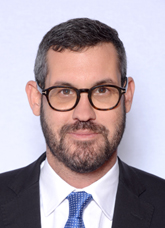
- Benzoni in 2022

Member of the Chamber of Deputies
- Incumbent
- Assumed office 13 October 2022
- Constituency: Lombardy 3 – P02

Personal details
- Born: 4 November 1985 (age 40)
- Party: Action (since 2019)

Fabrizio Benzoni (born 4 November 1985) is an Italian politician serving as a member of the Chamber of Deputies since 2022. He has been a municipal councillor of Brescia since 2013.
