= Davide Faraone =

Italian politician

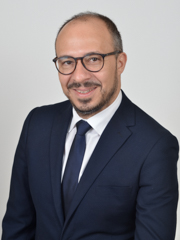
Davide Faraone in 2018.

Davide Faraone (born 19 July 1975) is an Italian politician who is the group leader of the Italia Viva grouping in the Senate of the Republic.

== See also ==
- List of current Italian senators
