= Mauro Del Barba =

Italian politician (born 1970)

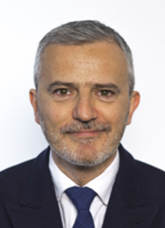
- Del Barba in 2018

Member of the Chamber of Deputies
- Incumbent
- Assumed office 23 March 2018
- Constituency: Lombardy 2 – P02 (2018–2022); Lombardy 4 – P01 (2022–present)

Member of the Senate
- In office 15 March 2013 – 22 March 2018
- Constituency: Lombardy

Personal details
- Born: 20 July 1970 (age 55)
- Party: Italia Viva (since 2019)

Mauro Del Barba (born 20 July 1970) is an Italian politician serving as a member of the Chamber of Deputies since 2018. From 2013 to 2018, he was a member of the Senate.
