= Federica Onori =

Italian politician

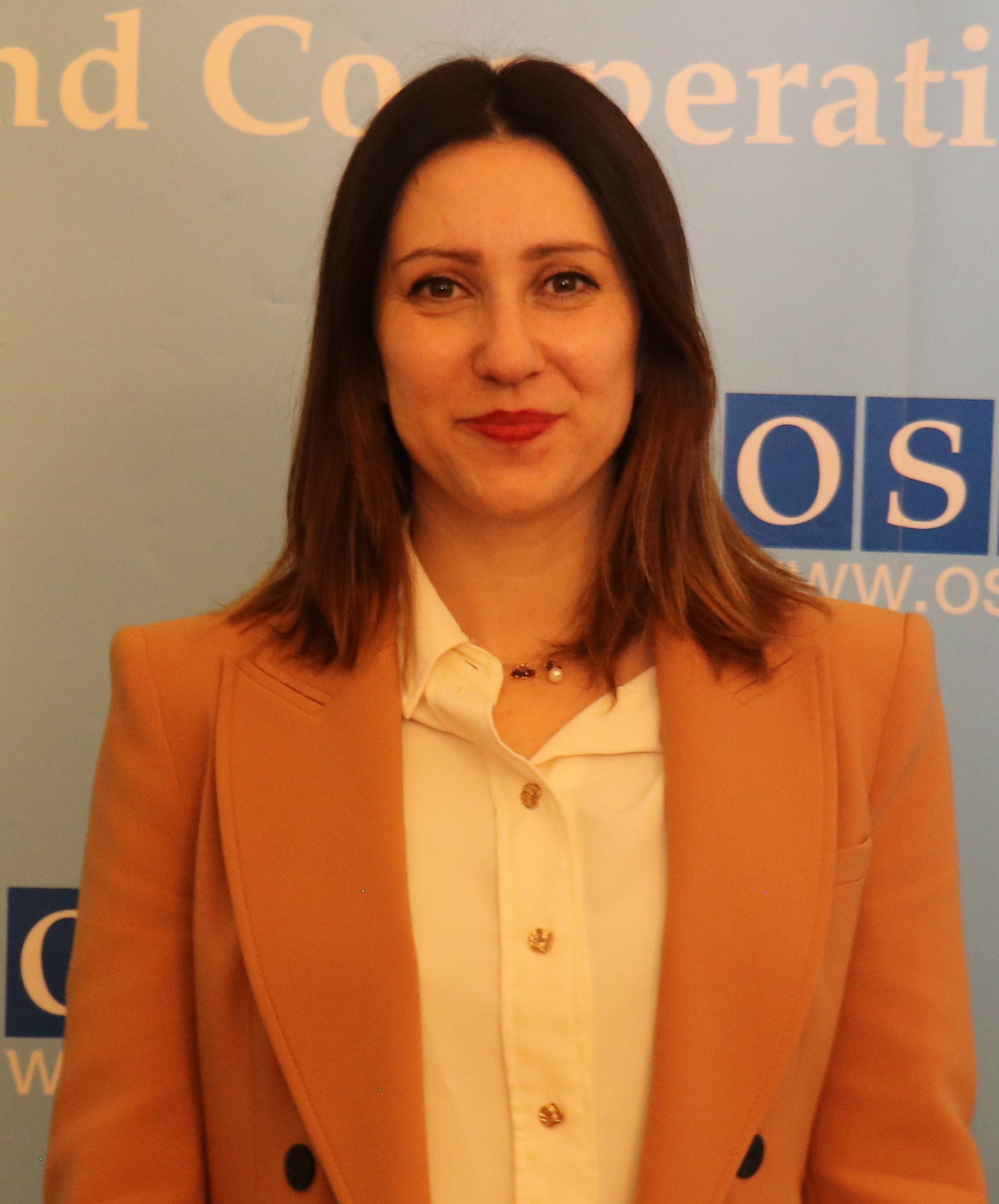
- Onori in 2025

Member of the Chamber of Deputies of Italy
- Incumbent
- Assumed office 13 October 2022
- Constituency: Overseas

Personal details
- Born: 16 June 1988 (age 38)
- Party: Action
- Other political affiliations: M5S (2022–2024)
- Education: Sapienza University of Rome

Federica Onori (born 16 June 1988) is an Italian politician. A member of Action, she has served in the Chamber of Deputies of Italy since 2022, representing the Overseas Constituency.
