= Marco Lombardo (politician) =

Italian politician (born 1981)

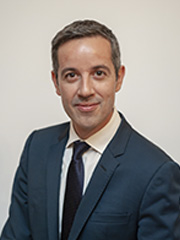
- Lombardo in 2022

Member of the Senate
- Incumbent
- Assumed office 13 October 2022
- Constituency: Lombardy – P02

Personal details
- Born: 2 January 1981 (age 45)
- Party: Action (since 2021)

Marco Lombardo (born 2 January 1981) is an Italian politician serving as a member of the Senate since 2022. From 2018 to 2021, he was an assessor of Bologna.
