= Andrea Cangini =

Italian politician (born 1969)

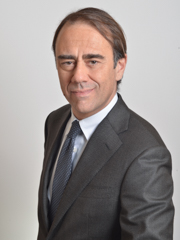
Cangini in 2018

Andrea Cangini (born 5 March 1969) is an Italian politician from Action who was elected to the Senate of the Republic in 2018.
