= Back to the Future (Italy) =

Back to the Future Ritorno al Futuro
- Leader: Matteo Renzi
- Coordinator: Ettore Rosato; Ivan Scalfarotto
- Founded: October 2018
- Dissolved: September 2019
- Merged into: Italia Viva
- Ideology: Third Way; Reformism; Liberalism
- Political position: Centre

Website
- Official website

Back to the Future (Italian: Ritorno al Futuro), officially Back to the Future – Civil Action Committees (Italian: Ritorno al Futuro – Comitati di Azione Civile), was a liberal movement within the Democratic Party (PD), a political party in Italy. Its leader was Matteo Renzi, the party's former national secretary and Prime Minister of Italy from February 2014 to December 2016, while Ivan Scalfarotto was the national coordinator.

The committees were launched by Renzi during the 2018 Leopolda convention in Florence, and were seen by many as the beginning of a Renzi's personal party.

On 17 September, during an interview to Italian newspaper la Repubblica, Renzi announced his intention to leave the PD and create a new parliamentary group led by himself. On the same day, interviewed by Bruno Vespa during the late-night TV talk-show Porta a Porta, he officially launched Italia Viva (IV). This brought the end of Back to the Future as a party faction; however, the Civic Action Committees continued to exist as the territorial structure of the new movement.
