= Valentina Grippo =

Italian politician (born 1971)

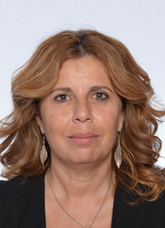
- Grippo in 2022

Member of the Chamber of Deputies
- Incumbent
- Assumed office 13 October 2022
- Constituency: Veneto 1 – P01

Personal details
- Born: 7 August 1971 (age 55)
- Party: Action (since 2019)

Valentina Grippo (born 7 August 1971) is an Italian politician serving as a member of the Chamber of Deputies since 2022. From 2018 to 2022, she was a member of the Regional Council of Lazio.
