= Elena Bonetti =

Italian politician (born 1974)

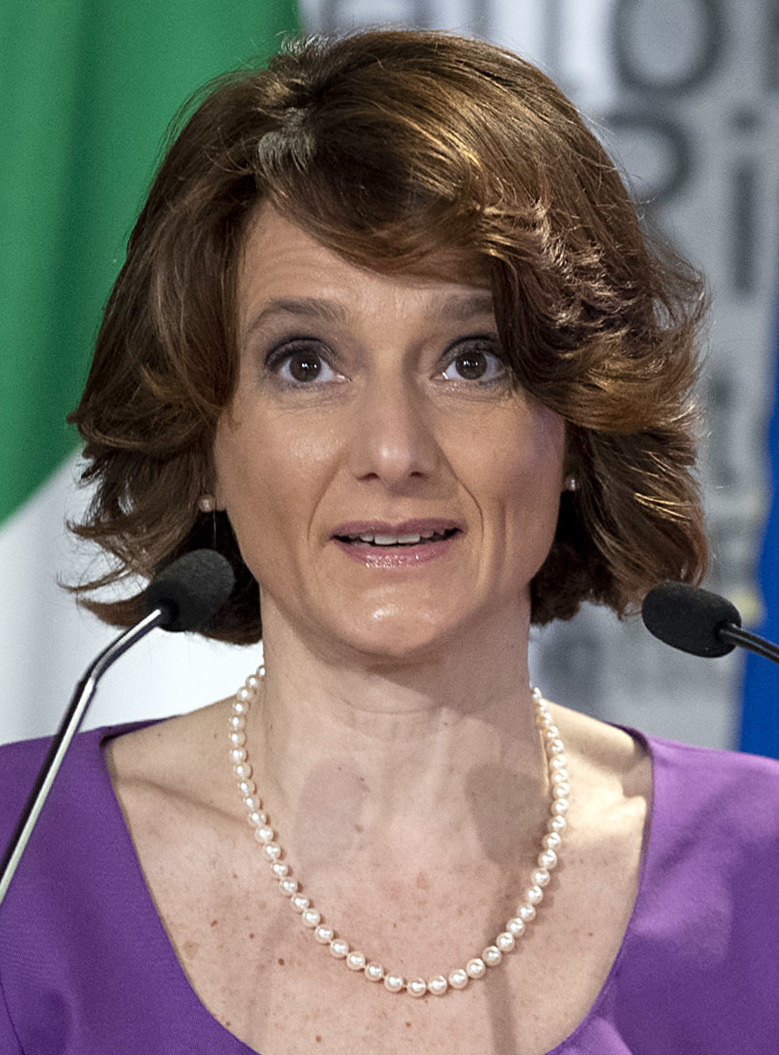
- Elena Bonetti in 2021

Minister for Family and Equal Opportunities
- In office 13 February 2021 – 22 October 2022
- Prime Minister: Mario Draghi
- Preceded by: Giuseppe Conte (Acting)
- Succeeded by: Eugenia Roccella
- In office 5 September 2019 – 14 January 2021
- Prime Minister: Giuseppe Conte
- Preceded by: Alessandra Locatelli
- Succeeded by: Giuseppe Conte (Acting)

Member of the Chamber of Deputies
- Incumbent
- Assumed office 13 October 2022
- Constituency: Veneto 2

Personal details
- Born: 17 April 1974 (age 52) Asola, Italy
- Party: Action (since 2024)
- Other political affiliations: PD (2017–2019); IV (2019–2023); PER (2023–2024)
- Spouse: Davide Boldrini
- Children: 2
- Education: University of Milan
- Occupation: Professor

Elena Bonetti (born 12 April 1974) is an Italian politician and mathematician who served as Minister for Family and Equal Opportunities between 2019 and 2022.

== Biography ==
Elena Bonetti was born on 12 April 1974 in Asola, Lombardy. She graduated from the University of Pavia in 1997, and in 2002 she obtained her PhD at the University of Milan, where she has served as Associate Professor of Mathematical Analysis. She studied partial differential equations and predictive modelling.

She has had some involvement in scouting and has served as a scout leader of Associazione Guide e Scouts Cattolici Italiani. In 2014, she signed an appeal, together with presbyter Andrea Gallo, to ask the Italian state to recognize same-sex marriage.

She entered politics as a candidate in the 2017 PD leadership election. Spotted by the then Prime Minister of Italy, Matteo Renzi, she was named the national manager for youth and training.

In 2018, she was a candidate for Italy's Chamber of Deputies, listed third on the PD's Lombardy list without being elected. On 5 September 2019, Bonetti was appointed the Italian Minister for Family and Equal Opportunities in the Conte II Cabinet. In September 2023 Bonetti left Italia Viva rejecting Matteo Renzi's platform on centrism, preparing to make a ticket with Carlo Calenda. On 7 October 2023 she announced that she was founding Populars Europeanists Reformers, which was meant to collaborate with Calenda's party during elections. In the Chamber of Deputies she then became Vice-President of the party, with Matteo Richetti at its head.
