= Giulia Pastorella =

Italian politician (born 1986)

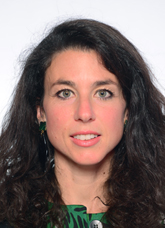
- Pastorella in 2022

Member of the Chamber of Deputies
- Incumbent
- Assumed office 13 October 2022
- Constituency: Lombardy 1

Personal details
- Born: 5 June 1986 (age 40)
- Party: Action

Giulia Pastorella (born 5 June 1986) is an Italian politician serving as a member of the Chamber of Deputies since 2022. In the 2021 Milan municipal election, she was elected member of the City Council of Milan.

== Biography ==
Pastorella was born and raised in Milan.

She moved to the United Kingdom at a young age, where she earned a bachelor’s degree in philosophy and modern languages from the University of Oxford. She subsequently specialized in European Affairs, earning a dual master’s degree from the London School of Economics and Sciences Po. In 2016, she earned a PhD in European Affairs with a dissertation on technocratic governments at the LSE, where she taught as an adjunct professor for three years. That same year, she was named by Forbes as one of the 30 most influential people under 30 in Europe in the Law & Politics sector.

She worked for nearly five years as Head of Public Affairs at HP, first in the United Kingdom, then at the European level, and finally at the global level, focusing on cybersecurity and data policy. In 2021, she was appointed director of public affairs for European Institutions at Zoom Communications.

In 2021, she published "Exit Only: What Italy Is Getting Wrong About the Brain Drain" with Editori Laterza, an essay that addresses the issue of skilled emigration and the human capital flight from Italy.
