= Carlo Calenda =

Italian politician (born 1973)

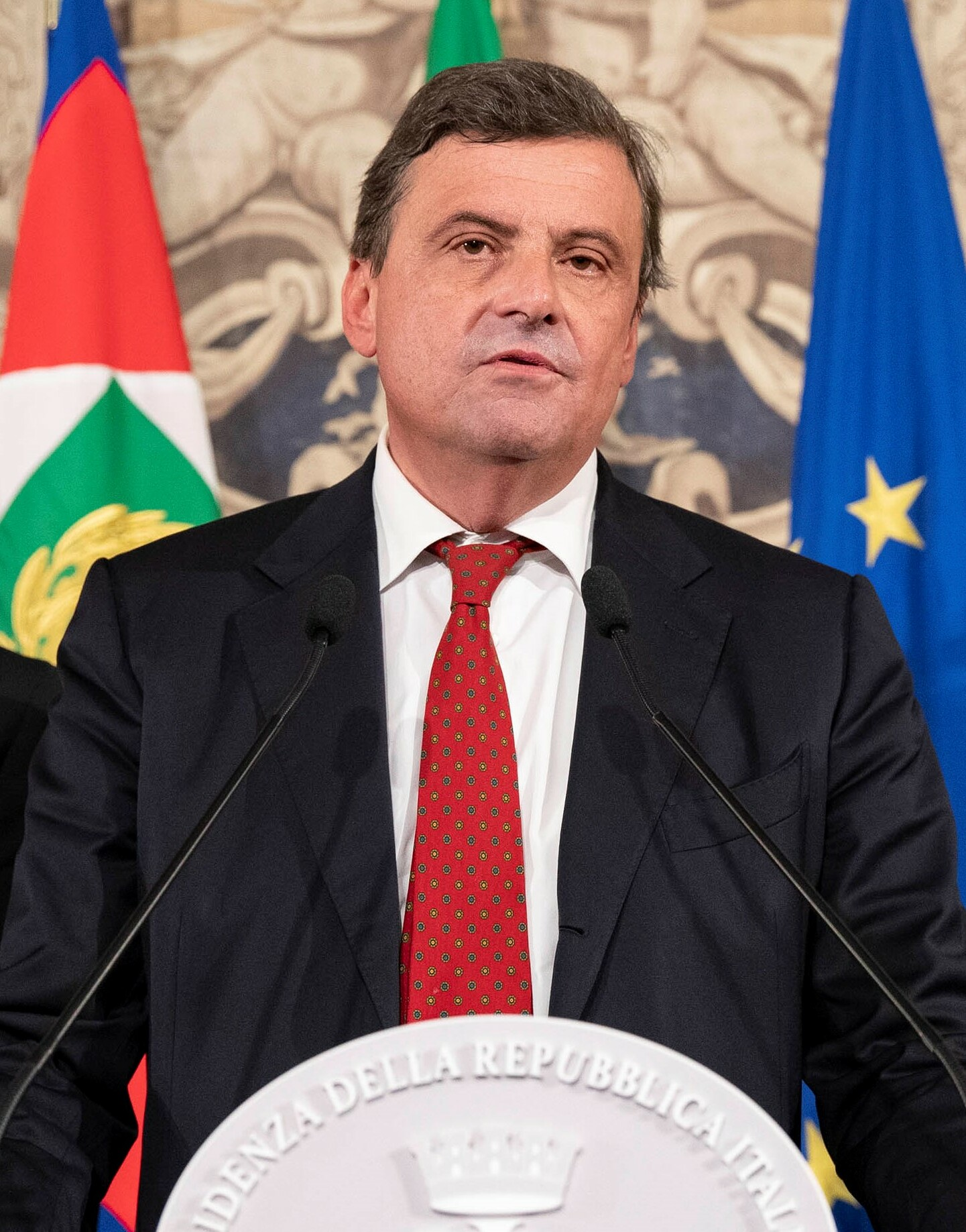

Minister of Economic Development
- In office 10 May 2016 – 1 June 2018
- Prime Minister: Matteo Renzi; Paolo Gentiloni
- Preceded by: Federica Guidi
- Succeeded by: Luigi Di Maio

Secretary of Action
- Incumbent
- Assumed office 20 February 2022
- Preceded by: Position established

Member of the Senate of the Republic
- Incumbent
- Assumed office 13 October 2022
- Constituency: Sicily

Member of the European Parliament for North-East Italy
- In office 2 July 2019 – 12 October 2022

Permanent Representative of Italy to the European Union
- In office 21 March 2016 – 10 May 2016
- Prime Minister: Matteo Renzi
- Preceded by: Stefano Sannino
- Succeeded by: Maurizio Massari

Personal details
- Born: 9 April 1973 (age 53) Rome, Italy
- Party: Action (2019–present)
- Other political affiliations: PCI (1980s); SC (2013–2015); Independent (2015–2018); PD (2018–2019)
- Spouse: Violante Guidotti Bentivoglio
- Children: 4
- Parent: Cristina Comencini (mother)
- Relatives: Luigi Comencini (grandfather); Francesca Comencini (aunt)
- Education: Sapienza University
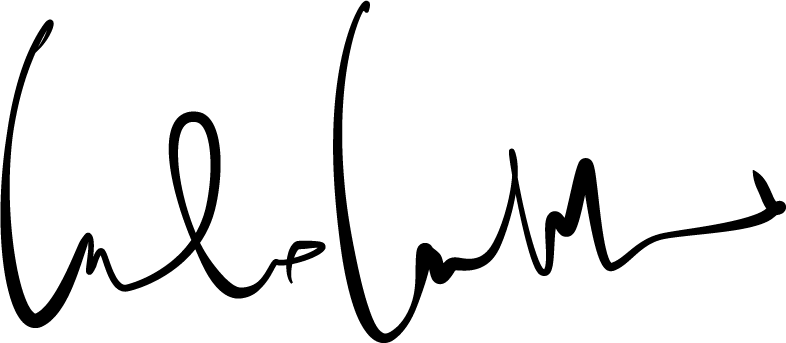
- Signature

Carlo Calenda (born 9 April 1973) is an Italian business executive and politician. Since 13 October 2022 he has served as a Senator of the Republic and, since 20 February 2022, as Secretary of Azione, a party he primarily founded in 2019 and led until his election as secretary.

He served as Minister of Economic Development in the Renzi and Gentiloni governments and was Italy's Permanent Representative to the European Union in 2016.

== Early life and business career ==
Born in Rome on 9 April 1973, he is the son of Fabio Calenda, an economist, journalist, and writer, and Cristina Comencini, a film director, in turn the daughter of film director Luigi Comencini.

After earning a degree in law from the University of Rome "La Sapienza" and prior to his institutional and political career, he worked at Confindustria as Director of Strategic International Affairs and Assistant to the President. He also worked at Sky Italia as Head of Product Marketing and Programming and at Ferrari, where he managed relations with financial institutions and oversaw Customer Relationship Management.

== Career in Government ==
Under the Renzi and Gentiloni governments, he served as Minister of Economic Development from May 2016, focusing on industrial policy, corporate crises, internationalization, energy, and communications. In the Letta government, he was appointed in 2013 as Deputy Minister of Economic Development, responsible for policies related to internationalization and foreign trade. From March to May 2016, he served as Italy's Permanent Representative to the European Union in Brussels. From 2019 to 2022, he was a Member of the European Parliament. Currently, he is a Senator of the Republic.

== Personal life ==
At the age of 16, he became a father to his first daughter, Tay. Later, he married Violante Guidotti Bentivoglio, a manager, with whom he has three more children.

== Political career ==
In October 2012, Calenda signed the political manifesto "Towards the Third Republic" from the Italia Futura movement. In the 2013 general elections, he was a candidate for the Chamber of Deputies on the Civic Choice - With Monti for Italy list in the Lazio 1 constituency, finishing as the first non-elected candidate.

=== Deputy Minister of Economic Development ===
On 3 May 2013, following the formation of the grand coalition government led by Enrico Letta and supported by Civic Choice, the Democratic Party (PD), People of Freedom, and the Union of the Centre, Calenda joined the Letta government as Deputy Minister of Economic Development. He was appointed on 2 May and served alongside Antonio Catricalà under Minister Flavio Zanonato.

After the Letta government collapsed and Matteo Renzi became Prime Minister on 28 February 2014 Calenda was confirmed as Deputy Minister of Economic Development, with a specific focus on foreign trade. During his tenure, he led numerous delegations of Italian entrepreneurs abroad and launched the extraordinary Made in Italy plan (Law No. 164/2014), which introduced measures to expand the number of companies, particularly small and medium-sized enterprises, active in global markets, increase Italy's share in international trade, enhance the image of Made in Italy worldwide and support initiatives to attract foreign investments to Italy.

He also opposed granting Market Economy Status to China.

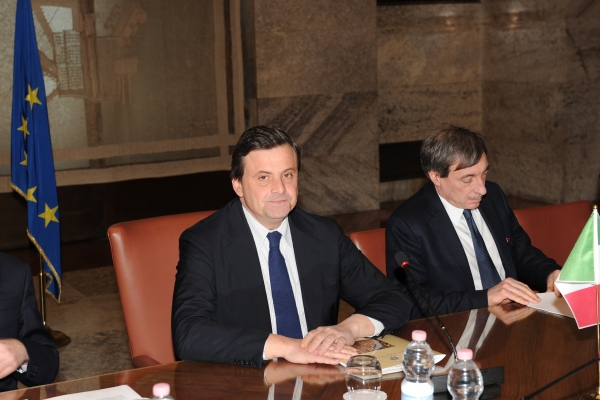
Calenda in February 2018

=== Italy's Representative to the European Union ===
On 20 January 2016 the Renzi government appointed Calenda as Italy's Permanent Representative to the European Union, replacing Ambassador Stefano Sannino.

=== Minister of Economic Development ===
On 10 May 2016, just two months after being appointed Italy’s Permanent Representative to the EU, Calenda was recalled to Rome to assume the role of Minister of Economic Development. He succeeded Matteo Renzi, who had temporarily taken over the position following the resignation of Federica Guidi due to the Tempa Rossa scandal.

On 12 December 2016, after Renzi resigned as Prime Minister following the failure of the Renzi-Boschi constitutional reform in a referendum, Calenda was confirmed as Minister of Economic Development in Paolo Gentiloni's new government.

As minister, he promoted and implemented Industry 4.0, the first strategic industrial development plan in Italy. This initiative introduced automatic incentives for companies investing in tangible and intangible capital goods, significantly boosting industrial innovation and investment. The plan demonstrated its success through increased purchases of eligible assets.

Calenda concluded his ministerial role at the end of the legislature.

=== 2019 European Elections ===
On 6 March 2018, two days after the Democratic Party (PD) suffered a significant defeat in the general elections, Calenda announced his membership in the party, expressing his intent to reform it with a reformist perspective.

Ahead of the 2019 European elections, he launched Siamo Europei (We Are Europeans), a political manifesto aimed at creating a united pro-European reformist list as an alternative to the sovereigntist bloc (comprising Lega and Fratelli d’Italia) and the populist bloc (represented by the Five Star Movement).

On March 19, Calenda officially announced his candidacy as the top candidate in the North-East constituency. The Siamo Europei list was presented on 30 March, in collaboration with the PD, led by Lazio President and PD Secretary Nicola Zingaretti. The manifesto attracted support from groups such as Campo Progressista, Democrazia Solidale, and other civic and political actors, including external supporters like Centrists for Europe. Articolo Uno also reached an agreement with the PD to present its candidates on the list.

In the 2019 European elections, Calenda was elected as a Member of the European Parliament with 279,783 votes in the North-East constituency, becoming the most-voted candidate on the PD list nationwide.

=== Leaving the PD and founding Azione ===
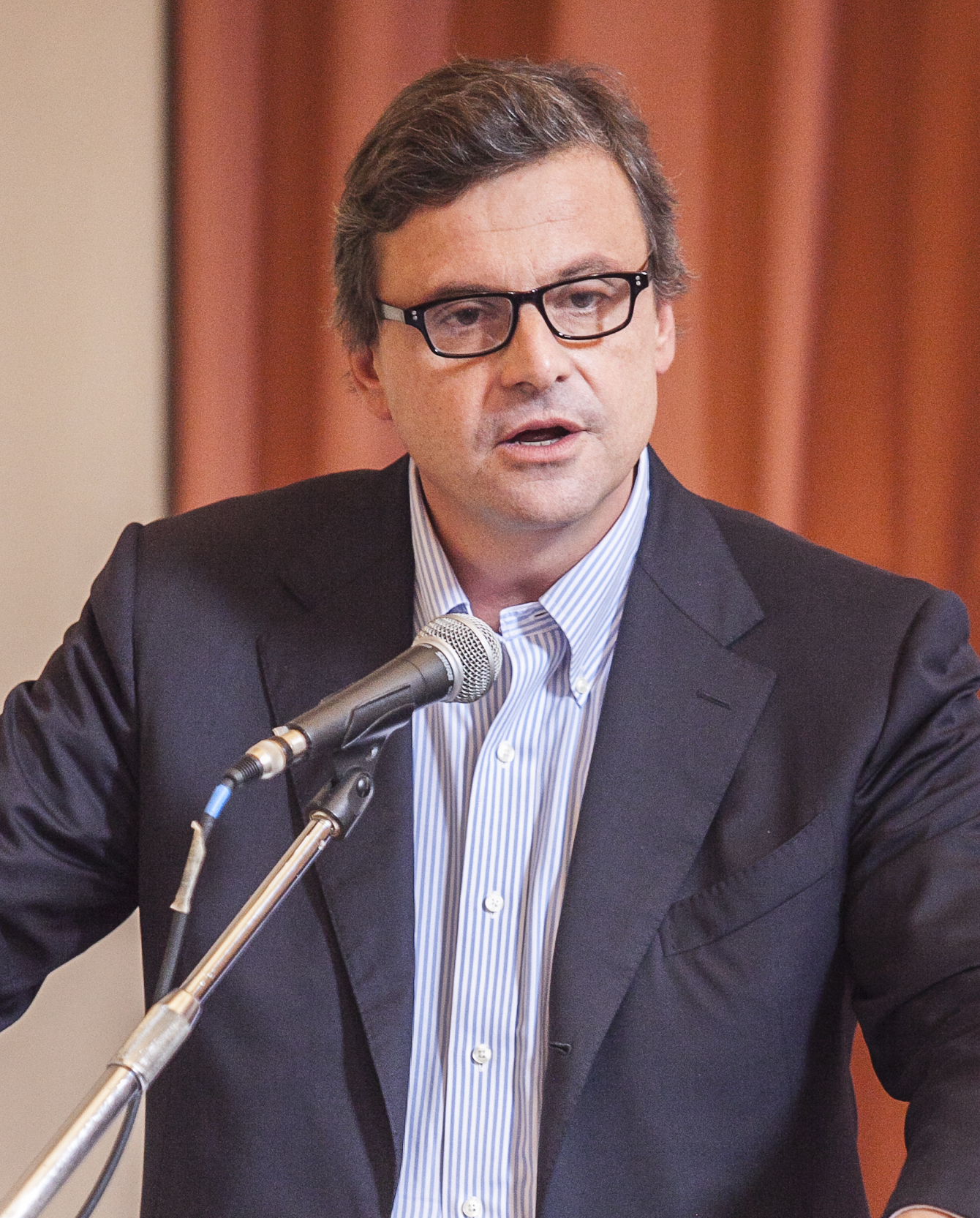
Carlo Calenda in 2019

On 23 July 2019 Calenda presented a motion to the PD National Directorate, approved with a large majority, stating that the Democratic Party and the Five Star Movement were and would remain incompatible due to their opposing values. The motion outlined three priorities for an immediate plan for Italy: education and training, healthcare, and investment.

On 28 August 2019, after the fall of the Conte I government and the PD’s agreement with the Five Star Movement to form a new government, Calenda announced his departure from the Democratic Party, citing consistency with the motion he had presented.

On 21 November 2019 Calenda officially launched Azione (Action), his new centrist political formation, alongside Senator Matteo Richetti and a promotional committee. The party draws inspiration from the liberal socialism of Carlo Rosselli, the social liberalism of Piero Gobetti, and the populism of Don Luigi Sturzo.

=== Run for Mayor of Rome ===
On 18 October 2020, during an appearance on Che tempo che fa with Fabio Fazio, Calenda announced his candidacy for Mayor of Rome in the 2021 local elections. Shortly after, +Europa and the Italian Republican Party endorsed his campaign, followed by Italia Viva in April 2021. On 24 May he officially launched his candidacy under the list "Calenda Sindaco".

In the elections, Calenda received 19.81% of the vote (219,878 votes), securing five seats on the City Council and finishing third, behind Enrico Michetti (center-right) and Roberto Gualtieri (center-left), but ahead of incumbent Mayor Virginia Raggi. Despite his success, Calenda renounced his council seat to focus on his role as MEP and leader of Azione.

=== Secretary of Azione ===
On 20 February 2022, during Azione’s first congress titled “Italy Seriously” at the Palazzo dei Ricevimenti e dei Congressi in Rome, Carlo Calenda was unanimously elected secretary of the party, while Matteo Richetti was elected president.

=== 2022 general election ===
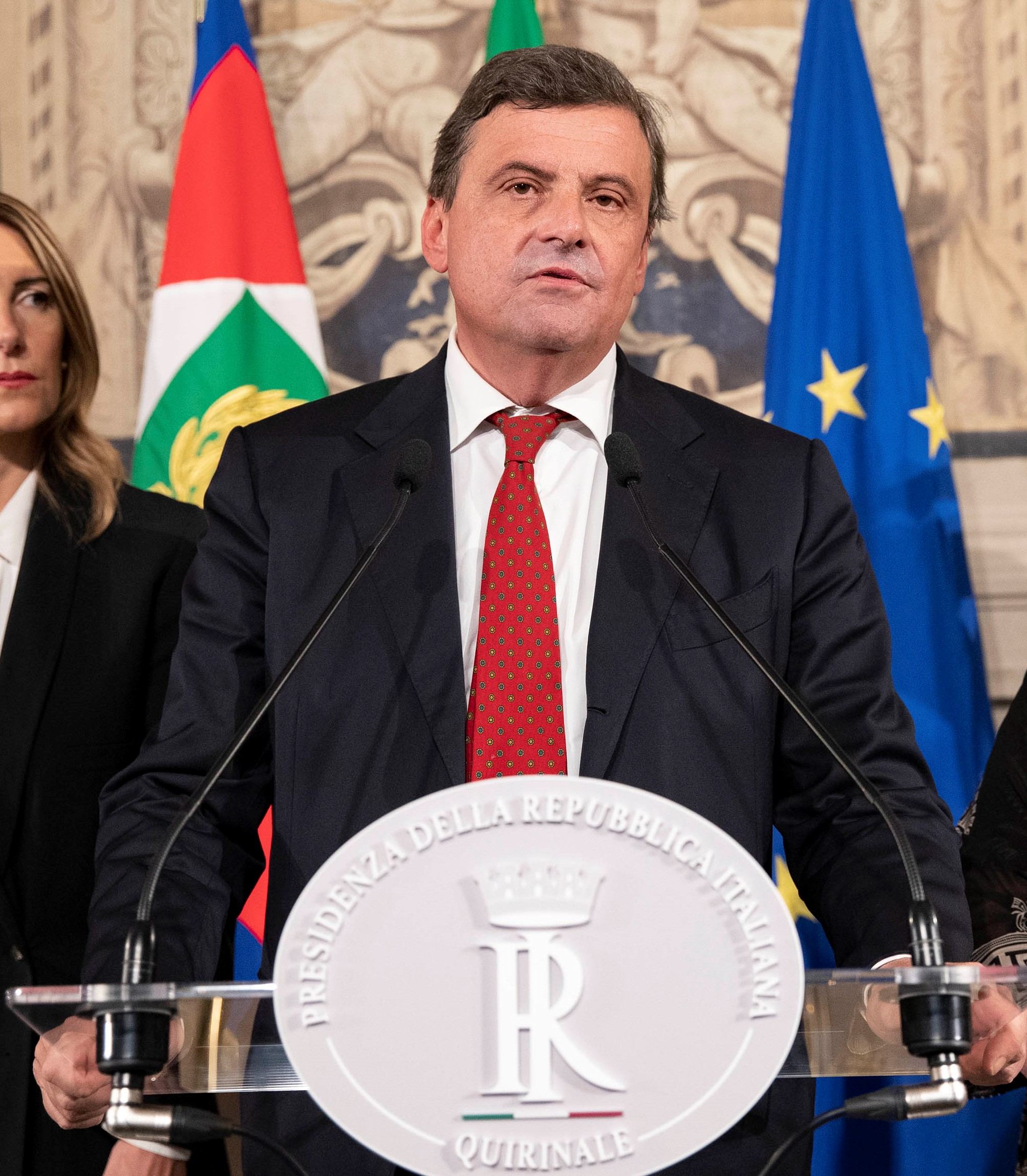
Calenda at the Quirinal Palace following the election

With the fall of the Draghi government and the early dissolution of Parliament, on 2 August Azione and +Europa announced they would join the Democratic Party coalition for the 2022 general elections. The three parties signed an agreement to avoid nominating divisive figures in single-member constituencies. However, on 7 August, following the inclusion of the Green-Left Alliance in the center-left coalition, Azione withdrew, causing a rift with +Europa.

On 11 August Azione and Italia Viva announced their decision to run together in the elections under a single list informally known as the Third Pole, with Calenda as leader. He ran for the Senate in the Lazio-02 single-member constituency (Rome Municipality XIV) and as the top candidate in several multi-member constituencies: Emilia-Romagna 2, Lazio 1, Sicily 1, and Veneto 2.

In the elections, Calenda was elected Senator in the multi-member Sicily-01 constituency, resigning from his position in the European Parliament on 12 October 2022. The Third Pole achieved 7.79% of the vote in the Chamber of Deputies and 7.73% in the Senate, exceeding the 3% threshold.

=== Azione-Italia Viva Federation and the 2024 European Elections ===
Following the elections, on 3 October 2022, Calenda announced that Azione and Italia Viva would form joint parliamentary groups in both chambers and establish a federation between the two parties.

On 8 December 2022, Calenda and Italia Viva leader Matteo Renzi signed an agreement for the official formation of the federation, with plans to merge into a single party. Calenda was appointed President of the Coordination Office, consistent with his leadership role during the previous elections.

However, in April 2023, irreconcilable differences over the process of creating the new party led to the dissolution of the federation. Following the split, prominent Italia Viva members Elena Bonetti and Ettore Rosato left their party to join Azione.

In May 2024, Azione ran in the European elections under the Siamo Europei list, with Calenda as the top candidate in all constituencies except the North-West, where he was listed last. In the June 2024 elections, Azione garnered 3.3% of the national vote, failing to surpass the 4% threshold required for European elections, in contrast to the lower threshold in national elections.

== Electoral history ==
Election	House	Constituency	Party	Votes	Result
2019	European Parliament	North-East Italy	PD	279,783	Elected
2022	Senate of the Republic	Rome – Municipio XIV	A–IV	77,211	Not elected
2022	Senate of the Republic	Lazio	A–IV	– (Note: Elected in a closed list proportional representation system.)	Elected

== Authored books ==
- Orizzonti selvaggi. Capire la paura e ritrovare il coraggio, Roma, Feltrinelli, 2018, ISBN 9788807173585
- I mostri e come sconfiggerli, Milano, Feltrinelli, 2020, ISBN 9788858838990
- La libertà che non libera. Riscoprire il valore del limite, La nave di Teseo, 2022, ISBN 9788834610749
- Il patto. Oltre il trentennio perduto, La nave di Teseo, 2023.

Political offices
Preceded by Federica Guidi	Minister of Economic Development; 2016–2018	Succeeded by Luigi Di Maio
