= Matteo Richetti =

Italian politician

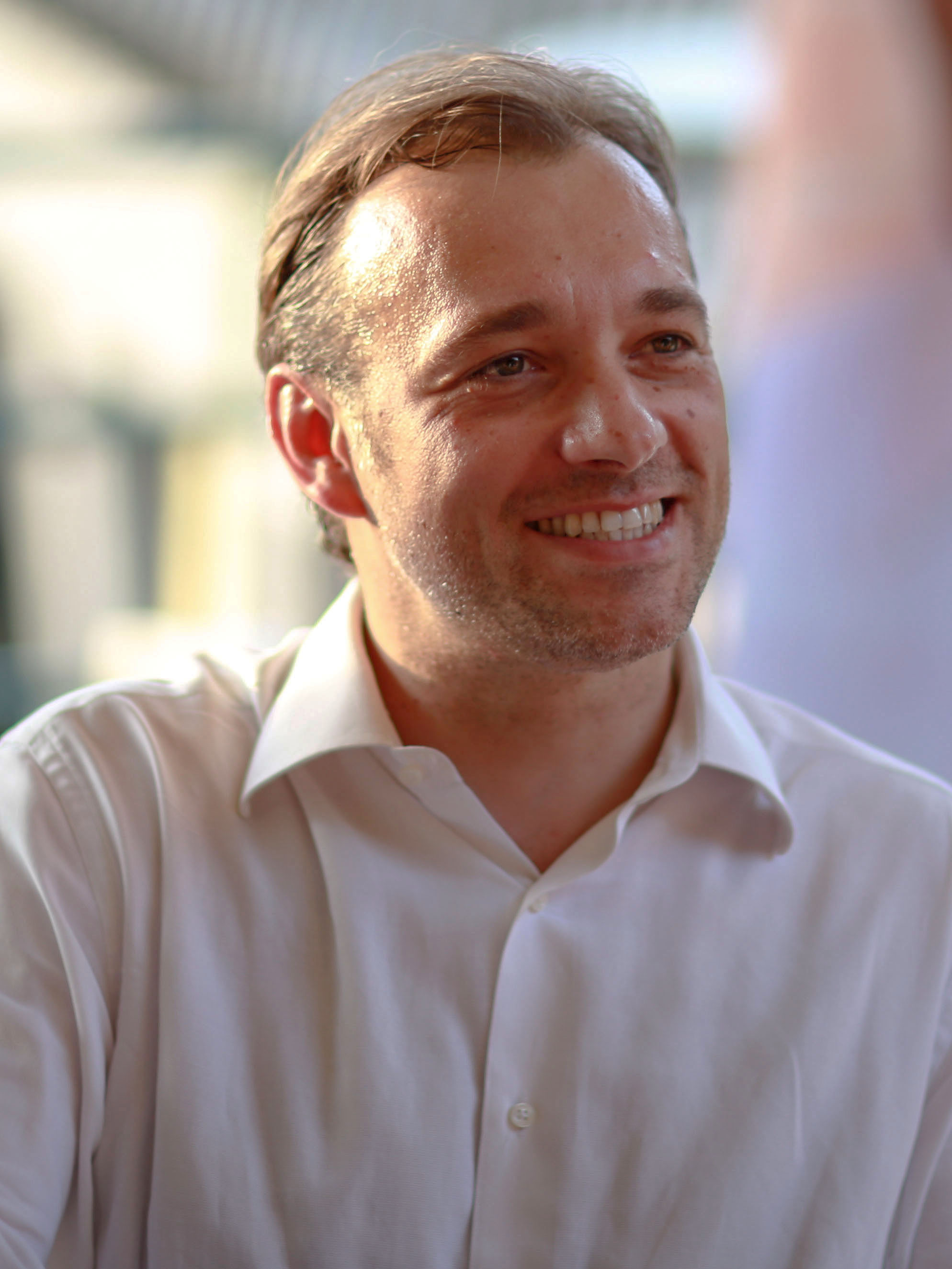

Spokesman of the Democratic Party
- In office 7 May 2017 – 14 July 2018
- Preceded by: Lorenzo Guerini
- Succeeded by: Marianna Madia

Member of the Chamber of Deputies
- Incumbent
- Assumed office 13 October 2022
- Constituency: Emilia-Romagna
- In office 15 May 2013 – 22 March 2018
- Constituency: Emilia-Romagna

Member of the Senate
- In office 23 March 2018 – 13 October 2022
- Constituency: Emilia-Romagna

Personal details
- Born: 3 August 1974 (age 52) Sassuolo, Italy
- Party: The Daisy (2003–2007); Democratic Party (2007–2019); Action (since 2019)
- Profession: Journalist

Matteo Richetti (born 3 August 1974) is an Italian politician, a member of the Italian Chamber of Deputies and former spokesman of the Democratic Party.

== Biography ==
Matteo Richetti was born in Sassuolo, Modena in 1974. He started his interest in politics when he attended the lyceum.

In 2003 he became a member of the Christian leftist The Daisy party; in 2007 he joined the Democratic Party.

During 2010s he became a close advisor of Matteo Renzi, former mayor of Florence and Prime Minister of Italy from 2014 to 2016. In 2017 Renzi appointed Richetti spokesman of the Democratic Party.

On 8 April 2018, Richetti launched his reformist faction Harambee and announced his intention to run as next secretary of the Democratic Party.

On 10 September 2019, Richetti announced his abstention regarding the investiture vote of the new government between PD and the Five Star Movement, and his subsequent exit from the party. On the same day, he stated that he would join Carlo Calenda's movement, Action.
