= Electric blue (color) =

Shade of blue representing lightning

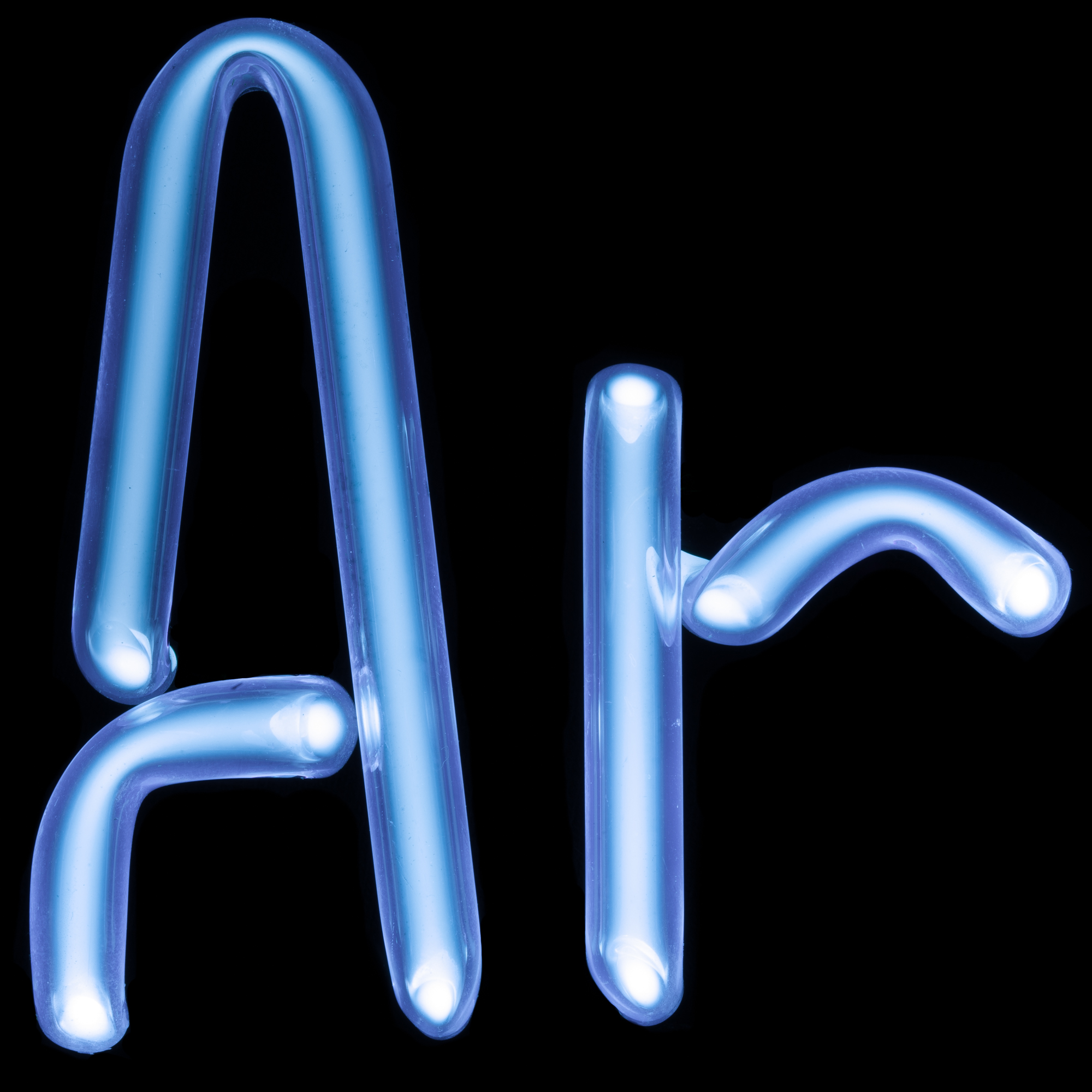
- Argon in a gas discharge lamp produces light of an electric blue color

Color coordinates
- Hex triplet: #7DF9FF
- sRGB^{B} (r, g, b): (125, 249, 255)
- HSV (h, s, v): (183°, 51%, 100%)
- CIELCh_{uv} (L, C, h): (91, 55, 197°)
- ISCC–NBS descriptor: Brilliant bluish green
- B: Normalized to [0–255] (byte)

Electric blue is a color whose definition varies but is often considered close to cyan, and which is a representation of the color of lightning, an electric spark, and the color of ionized argon gas; it was originally named after the ionized air glow produced during electrical discharges, though its meaning has broadened to include shades of blue that are metaphorically "electric" by virtue of being "intense" or particularly "vibrant". Electric arcs can cause a variety of color emissions depending on the gases involved, but blue and purple are typical colors produced in the troposphere where oxygen and nitrogen dominate.

The first recorded use of electric blue as a color name in English was in 1845. The color electric blue (the version shown below as medium electric blue) was in vogue in the 1890s.

== Variations of electric blue ==
=== Deep electric blue (French electric blue) ===
Deep Electric Blue

Color coordinates
- Hex triplet: #2C75FF
- sRGB^{B} (r, g, b): (44, 117, 255)
- HSV (h, s, v): (219°, 83%, 100%)
- CIELCh_{uv} (L, C, h): (52, 120, 259°)
- Source: Pourpre.com
- ISCC–NBS descriptor: Vivid blue
- B: Normalized to [0–255] (byte)

The deep tone of electric blue displayed adjacent is the color called bleu électrique in the Pourpre.com color list, a color list widely popular in France.

=== Iridescent electric blue ===
Iridescent Electric Blue

Color coordinates
- Hex triplet: #3137FD
- sRGB^{B} (r, g, b): (49, 55, 253)
- HSV (h, s, v): (238°, 81%, 99%)
- CIELCh_{uv} (L, C, h): (39, 133, 266°)
- Source: www.art-paints.com
- ISCC–NBS descriptor: Vivid blue
- B: Normalized to [0–255] (byte)

This shade of electric blue reflects the kind which is only metaphorically "electric". Its iridescence is also metaphoric.

=== Medium electric blue ===
Medium Electric Blue

Color coordinates
- Hex triplet: #035096
- sRGB^{B} (r, g, b): (3, 80, 150)
- HSV (h, s, v): (209°, 98%, 59%)
- CIELCh_{uv} (L, C, h): (34, 64, 253°)
- Source: Maerz and Paul
- ISCC–NBS descriptor: Deep blue
- B: Normalized to [0–255] (byte)

The color displayed adjacent, titled medium electric blue, is the electric blue which "had an immense vogue in the latter 19th century". Its source is a textile sample from the 1890s.

Today, this tone remains typical of "electric blue" fabrics in the mass market.

=== Dark electric blue ===
Dark Electric Blue

Color coordinates
- Hex triplet: #536878
- sRGB^{B} (r, g, b): (83, 104, 120)
- HSV (h, s, v): (206°, 31%, 47%)
- CIELCh_{uv} (L, C, h): (43, 19, 234°)
- Source: ISCC-NBS
- ISCC–NBS descriptor: Grayish blue
- B: Normalized to [0–255] (byte)

Dark electric blue is a dark cyan color that is the color called electric blue, formalized as a color in the ISCC–NBS system in 1955.

The normalized color coordinates for dark electric blue are identical to Payne's grey, which was first recorded as a color name in English in 1835.

== In nature ==
=== Crustaceans ===
The electric blue crayfish is a species of freshwater crayfish endemic to Florida.

=== Reptiles ===
The electric blue gecko was first discovered by biologist William in the 1950s.

== In the arts ==
=== Literature ===
Miss. Hunter, in the Sherlock Holmes story "The Adventure of the Copper Beeches", was required to wear an electric blue dress. It first published in the UK in The Strand Magazine, in June 1892.

=== Comics ===
In a 1998 retelling of the original 1963 story of Superman Red/Superman Blue, Superman is temporarily deprived of the solar energy which his body needs. To compensate, he harnesses electricity. This eventually forces him to adopt a blue and white suit to prevent the energy from dispersing. He retained most of his abilities but lost his heat-vision and used electric attacks instead. Some fans refer to this version of Superman as "Electric Blue Superman".

=== Music ===
David Bowie's song "Sound and Vision" references the color in the third verse,

Blue, blue, electric blue
That's the color of my room
Where I will live
Blue, blue

The new wave band Icehouse had a hit single in 1987 titled "Electric Blue".

== Other uses ==
The color electric blue is associated with the astrological sign of Aquarius.

== See also ==
- List of colors
- Electric indigo
