= Action (Italian political party) =

Action Azione
- Secretary: Carlo Calenda
- President: Elena Bonetti
- Founded: 21 November 2019; 6 years ago
- Split from: Democratic Party
- Headquarters: Corso Vittorio Emanuele II 21, Rome
- Membership (2022): 30,000
- Ideology: Liberalism (Italian)
- Political position: Centre
- National affiliation: Action–More Europe (2021–2022); Action–Italia Viva (2022–2023)
- European affiliation: European Democratic Party (2023); ALDE Party (since 2023)
- European Parliament group: Socialists and Democrats (2019–2021); Renew Europe (2021–2024; 2026–present)
- Colours: Blue Green
- Chamber of Deputies: 10 / 400
- Senate: 2 / 205
- European Parliament: 1 / 76
- Regional Councils: 8 / 896

Website
- azione.it

Action (Italian: Azione, abbr. A or Az) is a liberal political party in Italy. Its founder and leader is Carlo Calenda.

Originally launched as We Are Europeans (Siamo Europei, SE), it adopted its current name in November 2019 upon becoming a fully-fledged party. Calenda has described his party as "anti-populist" and "anti-souverainist". He also explained that the party's name is a historical reference to the short-lived post-World War II Action Party and an allusion to Carlo Rosselli's "liberal socialism". According to Calenda, the party is home to "pure liberals, but also liberal progressives (social liberals, like Calenda) and democratic Catholics (Christian democrats)".

Action was briefly a member of the European Democratic Party and joined the Alliance of Liberals and Democrats for Europe Party in October 2023. In the European Parliament Action's MEPs sat in the Socialists and Democrats group and, later, the liberal Renew Europe group. In the European Committee of the Regions, they sit with the Renew Europe CoR Group.

== History ==
=== Background ===
In the 2013 general election Calenda, who had been active within Luca Cordero di Montezemolo's Future Italy, was an unsuccessful candidate for the centrist Civic Choice (SC) party. He later served in various capacities (deputy minister, ambassador and minister) in the three governments of the 2013–2018 legislative term. In the aftermath of the 2018 general election, he officially joined the centre-left Democratic Party (PD).

=== We Are Europeans ===
In January 2019, Calenda launched a political manifesto named We Are Europeans (Siamo Europei), with the aim of creating a joint list composed of the PD and other progressive and pro-Europeanist parties for the upcoming European Parliament election. His proposal was welcomed by Nicola Zingaretti, then leader of the PD, but rejected by other parties within the centre-left coalition, including More Europe (+E) and Italia in Comune. In the run-up to the election, Zingaretti and Calenda presented a logo for their joint electoral list including a reference to We Are Europeans and the symbol of the Party of European Socialists. Additionally, they also joined with Article One, a left-wing party established in 2017 by splinters from the PD, led by former PD secretary Pier Luigi Bersani. The PD–SE joint list gained 22.7% of the vote, coming second after the League. Calenda, who ran in the North-East constituency, received more than 270,000 votes, thus becoming the most voted candidate of the list, and joined the Progressive Alliance of Socialists and Democrats (S&D) group.

In August 2019, tensions grew within the coalition supporting the first government of Giuseppe Conte, leading to the issuing of a motion of no-confidence by the League. During the following government crisis, the PD national board officially endorsed the possibility of forming a new cabinet in a coalition with the Five Star Movement (M5S), based on pro-Europeanism, green economy, sustainable development, fight against economic inequality and a new immigration policy. The party also agreed to keep Conte as the head of the new government, and on 29 August, President Sergio Mattarella re-appointed Conte as Prime Minister, this time at the head of a centre-left coalition. Calenda strongly opposed the new government, stating that the PD had renounced any representation of the "reformists", and that therefore it became necessary to establish a "liberal-progressive" movement. Calenda left the PD and on 5 September 2019, while Conte's second government was sworn in, announced the transformation of SE into a full-fledged party.

On 10 September 2019, Matteo Richetti, a prominent PD senator with a Catholic political upbringing and a close associate of former Prime Minister Matteo Renzi, abstained in the vote of confidence on the new government, and subsequently exited the party. He stated that he would join forces with Calenda.

=== Road to the new party ===
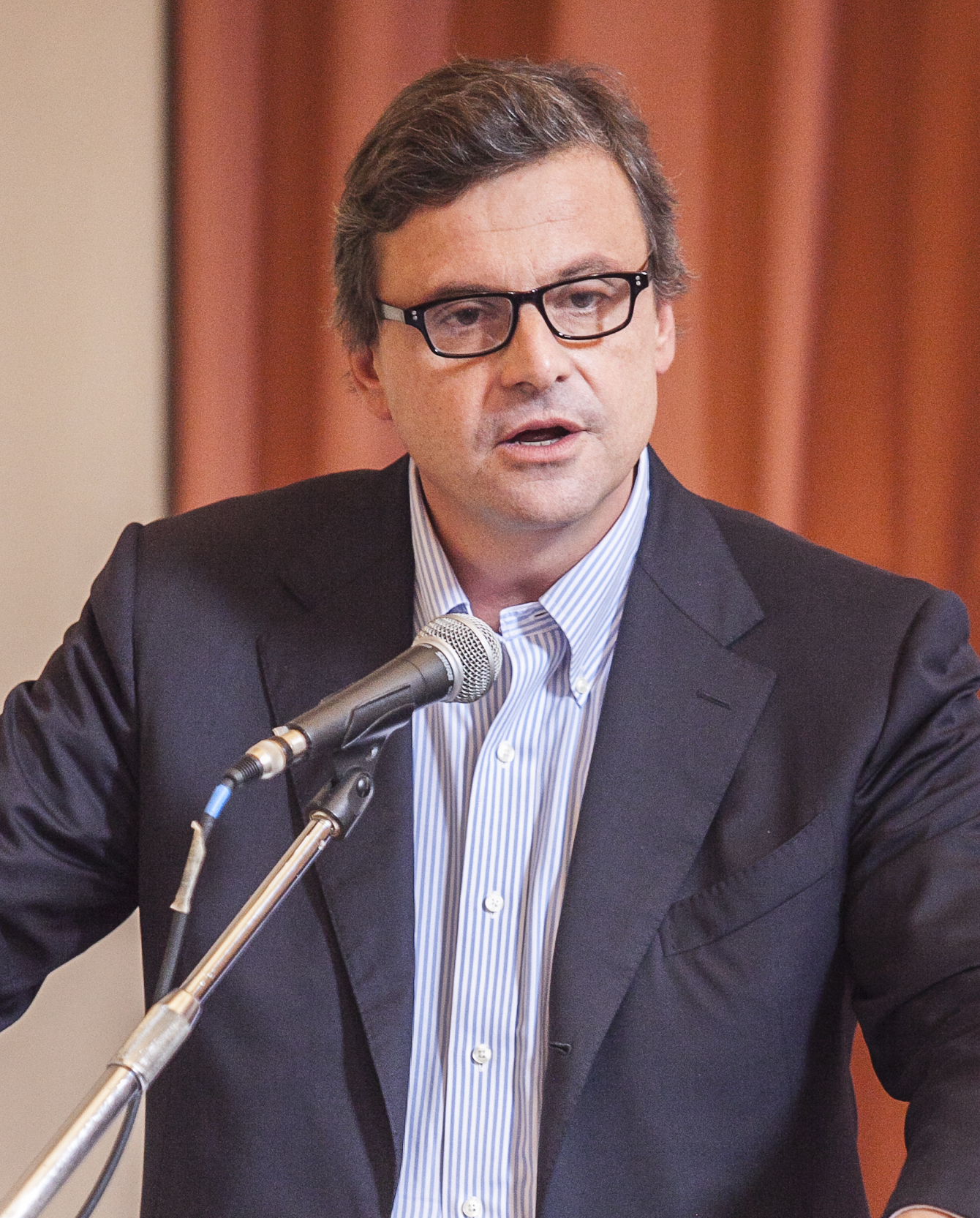
Carlo Calenda in 2019

In November 2019, SE was officially transformed into a new party named Action (Azione), which was organised also at the local level through the so-called "Action Groups" (Gruppi d'Azione). Calenda explained Action's "reformist" nature, while Richetti that "Action would not be a centrist party, but the true progressive pole of the country". Early donors of the party included Alberto Bombassei and Luciano Cimmino, both former MPs elected with SC. Early members of the party included Raffaele Bonanni (former secretary-general of the Italian Confederation of Workers' Trade Unions), Vincenzo Camporini (former Chief of the Defence Staff), Mario Raffaelli (former long-time deputy and under-secretary for the Italian Socialist Party), Walter Ricciardi (former president of the Istituto Superiore di Sanità) and Ugo Rossi (former President of Trentino).

In August 2020, two members of the Chamber of Deputies joined Action: former minister Enrico Costa, who had earlier left Forza Italia (FI) and a long-time advocate of reforms of the judiciary, and Nunzio Angiola, university professor and former member of the M5S.

In November 2020, deputies and senators affiliated with Action formed joint sub-groups in the Mixed Groups together with +E both in the Chamber and in the Senate. The sub-group in the Chamber counted four deputies, the one in the Senate three senators.

In March 2021, Carlo Cottarelli, a former director of the International Monetary Fund, was chosen by A, +E, the Italian Republican Party (PRI), the Liberal Democratic Alliance for Italy (ALI) and The Liberals to head of a scientific committee designed to elaborate of a joint political program.

In the 2021 municipal election in Rome, Calenda came third with 19.8% of the vote and the "Calenda for Mayor" list, comprising A, +E, PRI, IV and other minor liberal and centrist groups, won 19.1% of the vote, becoming the most voted list, ahead of the PD (whose candidate, Roberto Gualtieri, had launched a parallel "Gualtieri for Mayor" list and was elected at in the run-off).

In November 2021, Calenda left the S&D group in the European Parliament, after that it was hinted that the M5S might have joined it, and switched to Renew Europe.

In January 2022, the party formed a federation with +E.

=== Founding congress ===
On 19–20 February 2022, the party held its first congress, during which Calenda was elected secretary, Richetti president, Emma Fattorini (a former senator of the PD) and Giulia Pastorella vice presidents. The assembly welcomed several guest speakers, notably including Stéphane Séjourné of Renew Europe, Enrico Letta of the PD, Giancarlo Giorgetti of the League, Antonio Tajani of FI and Ettore Rosato of IV, as well as Benedetto Della Vedova of +E and the representatives of the other liberal parties with which Action had been cooperating. Calenda explained that Action would dialogue with all main parties, except the M5S and the Brothers of Italy (FdI), whose leaders were not invited to participate in the congress.

A few days before the congress, Barbara Masini had switched from FI. In the coming weeks, senator Leonardo Grimani (ex-PD and ex-IV) and deputies Claudio Pedrazzini, Osvaldo Napoli and Daniela Ruffino (all three ex-FI and ex-Cambiamo!) and Giorgio Trizzino (ex-M5S) joined the party.

=== 2022 general election ===
In July 2022, the M5S did not participate in a Senate's confidence vote on a government bill. Prime Minister Draghi offered his resignation, which was rejected by President Mattarella. After a few days, Draghi sought a confidence vote again to secure the government majority supporting his cabinet, while rejecting the proposal put forward by Lega and FI of a new government without the M5S. In that occasion, the M5S, Lega, FI and FdI did not participate in the vote. Consequently, Draghi tendered his final resignation to President Mattarella, who dissolved the houses of Parliament, leading to the 2022 general election. Calenda, who also had favoured a Draghi government without the M5S, was very critical of Lega and FI.

In the aftermath of Draghi's resignation, senator Andrea Cangini switched from FI to Action. In the event, Calenda hoped that also other leading dissidents of FI, including ministers Mariastella Gelmini and Mara Carfagna, could soon join the party. After Calenda's call, both Gelmini and Carfagna signalled that they would do so and were formally welcomed in the party during a press conference with Calenda. Contextually, other deputies followed the two ministers out of FI and joined Action.

In early August, Az/+E formed a political pact with the PD, that would give three candidates in single-seat constituencies to Az/+E for every seven candidates given to the PD. Less than a week later, Calenda announced that he was walking away from the pact because of the parallel alliances that the PD had signed with the Greens and Left Alliance (formed by Green Europe and Italian Left) and Civic Commitment (led by Luigi Di Maio and Bruno Tabacci). Calenda's decision caused the break-up of the federation with +E, as the latter's leaders wanted to continue their alliance with the PD. Finally, Action formed a joint electoral list with Matteo Renzi's Italia Viva (IV). The joint list obtained 7.8% of the vote.

In the aftermath of the election, during a national assembly in Naples, the party elected Carafagna as president with 84% of the delegates' vote, replacing Richetti, who had become the leader in the Chamber of Deputies. The party also approved a path toward a stable federation with IV with 93% of the vote.

After the election, Renzi frequently clashed with Calenda, leaving the alliance's future uncertain. In September 2023, Renzi announced that IV would run in the 2024 European Parliament election within a brand new coalition/list named "The Centre". This led former minister Elena Bonetti to leave the party in order to seek an alternative alliance with Action. Also Ettore Rosato, another IV leading member, was critical and seemed interested in joining Action, but, before leaving the party, he was expelled by Renzi. Subsequently, Bonetti and Rosato launched Populars Europeanists Reformers (PER). The pair finally joined Action in January 2024, with Bonetti becoming vice president and Rosato deputy secretary. Also in January, MP Federica Onori and MEP Fabio Massimo Castaldo switched from the M5S to Action.

In October 2023, having recently exited the European Democratic Party, Action joined the Alliance of Liberals and Democrats for Europe Party (ALDE) as a full member. In March 2024 Action formed a federative pact with the Italian Republican Party (PRI). Subsequently, Action formed an alliance also with the European Republicans Movement (MRE).

=== 2024 EP election ===
In the run-up of the 2024 European Parliament election, Action presented its "We are Europeans – Action" list. This list is composed of eight other parties or groups: NOS, PER, PRI, MRE, Liberal Socialist Association (LS), Liberal Democracy (DL), Reform Popular Civic Platform (PCPR) and Team K. Contextually, Italia Viva, More Europe, the Italian Socialist Party, the Italian Radicals, the European Liberal Democrats and L'Italia c'è formed an alternative liberal and pro-Europeanist list named "United States of Europe". As a result, a minority of More Europe, including its president Federico Pizzarotti, left the party, joined Action and will run in the election. Calenda and Bonetti will stand as candidates in all five constituencies.

In the run-up of three regional elections scheduled in the fall of 2024, Calenda aligned the party with the centre-left. This caused the exit of four senior centre-right figures, namely president Carfagna, deputy secretaries Costa and Gelmini, as well as Giusy Versace. The first two were sitting deputies and the other two sitting senators, as a result the party was reduced to 10 deputies and two senators. Costa re-joined FI, while the other three joined Us Moderates.

In the run-up to the party's second congress, to be held in March 2025, Calenda was re-elected with 85.8% of the vote by party members. Calenda was challenged by outgoing vice president Pastorella, who was not able to field her candidacy all over the country and was particularly strong in northern Italy. During the congress, which saw the participation of leading politicians from left and right, including Prime Minister Giorgia Meloni, Minister of Defense Guido Crosetto and former EU Commissioner Paolo Gentiloni, Calenda was proclaimed secretary again and Bonetti was elected president by acclamation. Calenda proposed a transversal alliance between his party, FI, sectors of the PD and some centrist parties.

In the 2025 regional elections the party did not run as a party, but individual members were elected from centrist joint lists in Aosta Valley and Veneto.

In February 2026 Elisabetta Gualmini MEP left the PD and joined Action, giving it representation in the European Parliament.

== Election results ==
=== Italian Parliament ===
Election	Leader	Chamber of Deputies					Senate of the Republic					Government
Election	Leader	Votes	%	Seats	+/–	Position	Votes	%	Seats	+/–	Position	Government
2022	Carlo Calenda	Into A–IV		12 / 400	New	6th	Into A–IV		4 / 200	New	6th	Opposition

=== European Parliament ===
Election	Leader	Votes	%	Seats	+/–	EP Group
2024	Carlo Calenda	785,580 (7th)	3.36	0 / 76	New	–

=== Regional Councils ===
Region	Election year	Votes	%	Seats	+/−	Status in legislature
Aosta Valley	2025	Into Autonomists of the Centre		1 / 35	▲1	Majority
Lombardy	2023	Into Action – Italia Viva		1 / 80	–	Opposition
Friuli-Venezia Giulia	2023	Into Action – Italia Viva		0 / 48	–	No seats
Emilia-Romagna	2020	Into Bonaccini list		1 / 50	–	Majority
Lazio	2023	Into Action – Italia Viva		0 / 51	–	No seats
Abruzzo	2024	23,156	4.00%	1 / 31	–	Opposition
Sicily	2022	Into Action – Italia Viva		0 / 70	–	No seats
Sardinia	2024	Into Action – +Eu – LDE – UPC		0 / 60	–	No seats

== Leadership ==
- Secretary: Carlo Calenda (2022–present)
  - Deputy Secretary: Enrico Costa (2022–2024), Mariastella Gelmini (2022–2024), Andrea Mazziotti (2022–present), Ettore Rosato (2024–present), Francesca Scarpato (2024–present)
  - Coordinator: Andrea Mazziotti (2022–present)
  - Organisational secretary: Ettore Rosato (2025–present)
  - Spokesperson: Valentina Grippo (2022), Mariastella Gelmini (2022–2024), Francesca Scarpato (2025–present)
- President: Matteo Richetti (2022), Mara Carfagna (2022–2024), Elena Bonetti (2025–present)
  - Vice President: Emma Fattorini (2022–present), Giulia Pastorella (2022–present), Elena Bonetti (2024–2025)
- Party leader in the Chamber of Deputies: Matteo Richetti (2022–present)

== Symbols ==
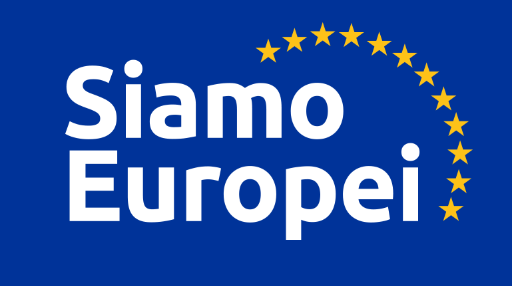
We Are Europeans logo

Action logo until October 2021

Action logo since October 2021
