= Ettore Rosato =

Italian politician (born 1968)

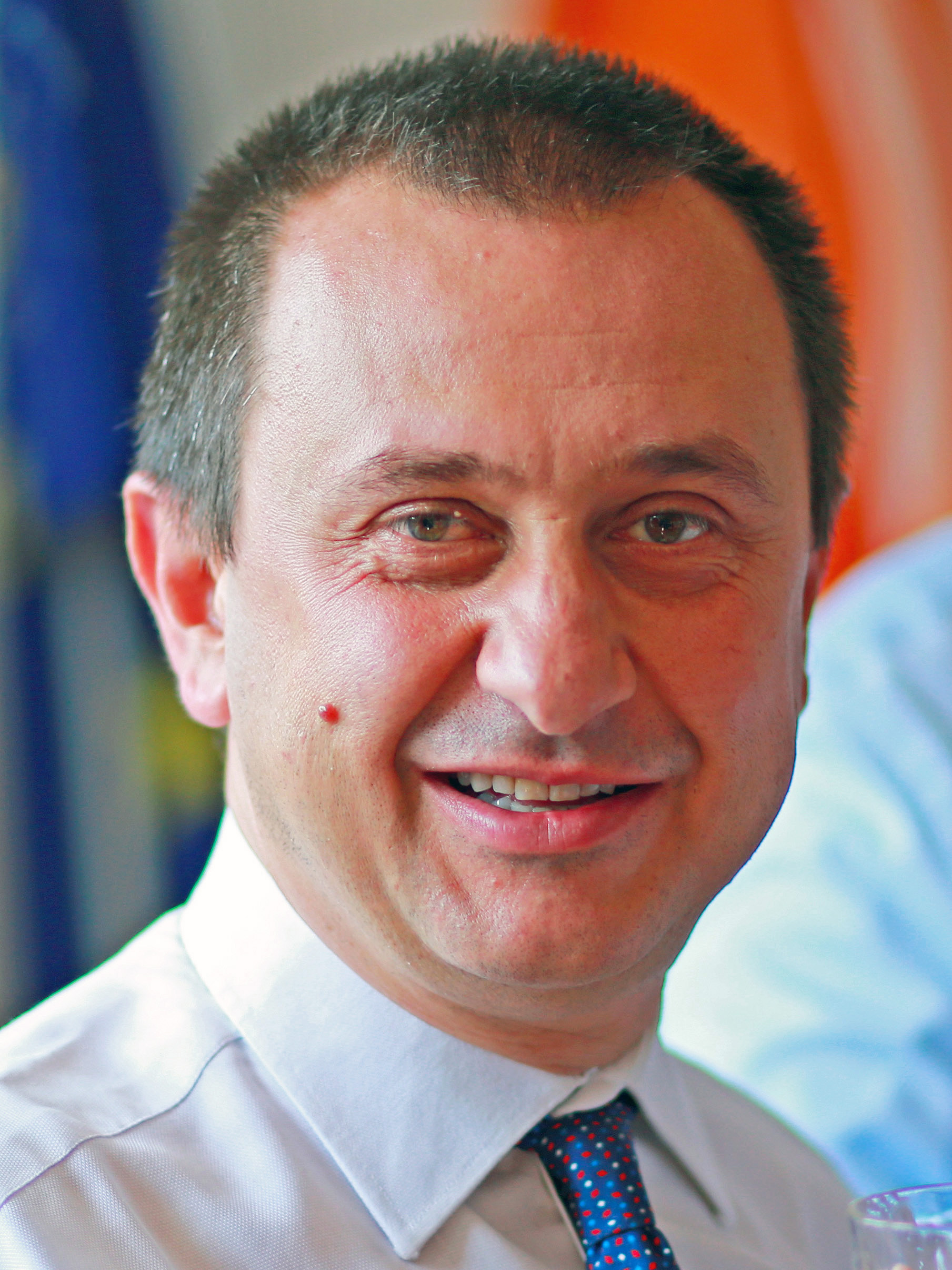

Member of the Chamber of Deputies
- Incumbent
- Assumed office 29 April 2008
- Constituency: Friuli-Venezia Giulia
- In office 29 October 2003 – 27 April 2006
- Constituency: Friuli-Venezia Giulia

Personal details
- Born: 28 July 1968 (age 58) Trieste, Italy
- Party: DC (until 1994); PPI (1994–2002); The Daisy (2002–2007); PD (2007–2019); Italia Viva (2019–2023); PER (2023–2024); Action (since 2024)

Ettore Rosato (born 28 July 1968) is an Italian politician, member of the Chamber of Deputies, and formerly leader of the Democratic Party in the Chamber.

== Political career ==
Rosato was born in Trieste in 1968. He started his interest in politics when he attended the liceo (high school).

In the late 1980s he became a member of the Christian Democracy (DC) party and was elected city councilor in his hometown. When the DC was later disbanded he joined the Italian People's Party (PPI) and The Daisy (DL).

In 2003 he became a member of the Italian Chamber of Deputies. Later in 2005 he ran for the office of Mayor of Trieste at the head of a centre-left coalition, to narrowly lose to the incumbent centre-right Mayor Roberto Dipiazza.

In 2007 he was among the founders of the Democratic Party.

Rosato was re-elected to the Chamber of Deputies in the 2008 and 2013 general elections.

On 16 June 2015 he was elected Leader of the PD in the Chamber of Deputies with 239 votes out of 291, replacing Roberto Speranza.

=== Italian electoral law of 2017 ===
In Autumn 2017, Rosato was the proposer of a new electoral law, which was named after him, Rosatellum bis.

The Rosatellum bis is a parallel system, which act as a mixed system, with 36% of seats allocated using a first past the post electoral system and 64% using a proportional method, with one round of voting. The Senate and the Chamber of Deputies did not differ in the way they allocated the proportional seats, both using the D'Hondt method of allocating seats.

The new electoral law was supported by the Democratic Party and his government ally Popular Alternative, but also by the opposition parties Forza Italia, Lega Nord and Liberal Popular Alliance. Despite many protests from the Five Star Movement and the Democratic and Progressive Movement, the electoral law was approved on 12 October by the Chamber of Deputies with 375 votes in favor and 215 against, and on 26 October by the Senate with 214 votes against 61.
