= Party lists in the 2024 European Parliament election in Italy =

The 2024 European Parliament election in Italy to elect the delegation from Italy was held on 8 and 9 June 2024. The outgoing MEPs are shown in italics.

== Action ==
=== North-West Italy ===
N°	Name	Born	Birthplace	Region	National party	Votes
20	Carlo Calenda	April 9, 1973	Rome	Lazio	Action	23,487
4	Alessandro Tommasi	December 12, 1985	Como	Lombardy	NOS	15,361
1	Elena Bonetti	April 12, 1974	Asola, Mantua	Lombardy	PER	12,561
2	Giuseppe Zollino	July 28, 1962	Maglie, Lecce	Apulia	Action	9,101
5	Caterina Avanza	April 6, 1981	Brescia	Lombardy	Action	7,240
10	Leonardo Lotto	February 5, 1999	Aosta	Vallee d'Aoste	—N/a	7,059
13	Cristina Lodi	February 12, 1970	Genoa	Liguria	Action	5,533
3	Maria Abbracchio	November 22, 1956	Milan	Lombardy	—N/a	4,237
8	Daniele Nahum	January 24, 1983	Milan	Lombardy	—N/a	3,357
6	Cuno Jakob Tarfusser	August 11, 1954	Merano, South Tyrol	Trentino-Alto Adige/Südtirol	—N/a	2,139
19	Federica Valcauda	March 12, 1994	Biella	Piedmont	—N/a	1,557
18	Giovanni Barosini	July 5, 1960	Cave, Rome	Lazio	Action	1,556
12	Federico Giacobbe	April 1, 1983	Genoa	Liguria	Action	969
11	Antonella Girardi	September 11, 1969	Como	Lombardy	—N/a	755
9	Simonetta Fiaccadori	April 1, 1964	Milan	Lombardy	—N/a	730
16	Salvatore Carrara	June 4, 1941	Messina	Sicily	—N/a	674
15	Marina Lombardi	June 4, 1964	Varese	Lombardy	—N/a	668
17	Laura Marchini	September 22, 1972	Arona, Novara	Piedmont	—N/a	543
7	Daniela Di Cosmo	November 11, 1968	Moncalieri, Turin	Piedmont	PRI	499
14	Riccardo De Giorgi	June 3, 1976	Andria, Barletta-Andria-Trani	Apulia	PRI	353
Source: Candidates, Results

=== North-East Italy ===
N°	Name	Born	Birthplace	Region	National party	Votes
1	Carlo Calenda	April 9, 1973	Rome	Lazio	Action	22,548
13	Paul Köllensperger	August 13, 1970	Bolzano	Trentino-Alto Adige/Südtirol	Team K	11,251
3	Federico Pizzarotti	October 7, 1973	Parma	Emilia-Romagna	Action	11,135
9	Carlo Pasqualetto	June 1, 1988	Camposampiero, Padua	Veneto	Action	10,012
2	Elena Bonetti	April 12, 1974	Asola, Mantua	Lombardy	PER	8,764
5	Mario Raffaelli	May 15, 1946	Trento	Trentino-Alto Adige/Südtirol	Action	5,697
4	Lara Bisin	August 29, 1976	Malo, Vicenza	Veneto	—N/a	5,256
14	Federica Sabbati	September 27, 1972	Trieste	Friuli-Venezia Giulia	—N/a	3,115
15	Umberto Costantini	December 10, 1987	Vignola, Modena	Emilia-Romagna	Action	2,692
8	Silvia Fattore	March 25, 1973	Camposampiero, Padua	Veneto	—N/a	2,529
11	Riccardo Mortandello	June 28, 1981	Padua	Veneto	—N/a	2,106
12	Giuditta Righetti	August 13, 1991	Verona	Veneto	—N/a	1,702
10	Valeriana Maria Masperi	November 4, 1950	Argenta, Ferrara	Emilia-Romagna	PRI	956
6	Stefania Cargioli	May 31, 1962	Pavullo nel Frignano, Modena	Emilia-Romagna	—N/a	835
7	Giovanni Poggiali	December 18, 1971	Florence	Tuscany	United Romagna	572
Source: Candidates, Results

=== Central Italy ===
N°	Name	Born	Birthplace	Region	National party	Votes
1	Carlo Calenda	April 9, 1973	Rome	Lazio	Action	24,617
3	Alessio D'Amato	March 13, 1968	Rome	Lazio	Action	9,864
2	Elena Bonetti	April 12, 1974	Asola, Mantua	Lombardy	PER	8,365
5	Vincenzo Camporini	June 21, 1946	Como	Lombardy	Action	6,585
9	Massimo Seri	November 15, 1964	Schwyz	Switzerland	—N/a	3,869
8	Barbara Masini	January 22, 1974	Pistoia	Tuscany	Action	3,801
6	Nataliya Kudryk	June 13, 1975	Kyiv	Ukraine	—N/a	2,690
14	Gabriella Ga Yeng Zanzanaini	April 24, 1983	Hong Kong	China	NOS	2,321
15	Luca Pietro Ungaro	November 14, 1992	Rome	Lazio	NOS	2,109
7	Germano Craia	February 27, 1979	Monte Urano, Fermo	Marche	Action	1,932
4	Cristina Bibolotti	April 28, 1977	Pietrasanta, Lucca	Tuscany	—N/a	1,821
13	Umberto Trenta	November 6, 1954	Ascoli Piceno	Marche	European Republicans	1,314
12	Rossella Pera	February 13, 1985	Como	Lombardy	—N/a	1,262
10	Debora Pacifici	September 14, 1972	Rome	Lazio	PRI	1,153
11	Luciano Spigliantini	December 1, 1957	Pratovecchio, Arezzo	Tuscany	PRI	555
Source: Candidates, Results

=== Southern Italy ===
N°	Name	Born	Birthplace	Region	National party	Votes
3	Marcello Pittella	June 4, 1962	Lauria, Potenza	Basilicata	Action	33,028
9	Giuseppe Ferrandino	March 21, 1963	Ischia, Naples	Campania	Action	22,117
17	Giuseppe Sommese	May 23, 1994	Naples	Campania	Action	20,355
1	Carlo Calenda	April 9, 1973	Rome	Lazio	Action	13,934
5	Luigi Casciello	March 11, 1963	Benevento	Campania	Action	12,776
7	Francesco De Nisi	September 18, 1968	Filadelfia, Vibo Valentia	Calabria	Action	12,698
2	Elena Bonetti	April 12, 1974	Asola, Mantua	Lombardy	PER	9,629
18	Barbara Preziosi	May 26, 1974	Naples	Campania	PER	8,175
8	Libera D'Amelio	January 23, 1975	Reggio Calabria	Calabria	Action	6,454
16	Stefania Postorivo	August 24, 1982	Cosenza	Calabria	Action	5,159
10	Paola Fanfarillo Manganiello	October 10, 1974	Reggio Calabria	Calabria	PRI	5,000
12	Danila Iacovelli	April 17, 1973	Foggia	Apulia	—N/a	3,835
4	Ramona Calafiore	February 20, 1984	Reggio Calabria	Calabria	—N/a	3,468
6	Carmela Craca	June 21, 1973	Putignano, Bari	Apulia	—N/a	3,078
14	Lucia Iodice	December 7, 1966	Villaricca	Campania	—N/a	2,556
13	Valerio Potì	June 6, 1972	Lecce	Apulia	—N/a	1,671
11	Dario Galantino	December 13, 1981	Molfetta, Barletta-Andria-Trani	Apulia	—N/a	1,093
15	Giuseppe Rossodivita	October 22, 1969	Milan	Lombardy	Transnational Radical Party	888
Source: Candidates, Results

=== Italian Islands ===
N°	Name	Born	Birthplace	Region	National party	Votes
1	Carlo Calenda	April 9, 1973	Rome	Lazio	Action	7,973
2	Sonia Alfano	October 15, 1971	Messina	Sicily	Action	4,905
5	Gianni Palazzolo	April 2, 1972	Palermo	Sicily	Action	3,553
7	Nicola Trudu	August 31, 1982	Cagliari	Sardinia	—N/a	1,202
8	Elena Bonetti	April 12, 1974	Asola, Mantua	Lombardy	PER	1,202
4	Martina Benoni	May 24, 1989	Cagliari	Sardinia	—N/a	1,190
6	Rosanna Cocomero	September 12, 1965	Palermo	Sicily	—N/a	584
3	Gianfranco Damiani	March 21, 1948	Brindisi	Apulia	PRI	514
Source: Candidates, Results

== Brothers of Italy ==
=== North-West Italy ===
N°	Name	National party	Votes
1	Giorgia Meloni	Brothers of Italy	
2	Carlo Fidanza	Brothers of Italy	
3	Enzo Amich	Brothers of Italy	
4	Patrizia Baffi	Brothers of Italy	
5	Stefano Balleari	Brothers of Italy	
6	Federica Barbero		
7	Marco Colombo		
8	Giovanni Crosetto		
9	Pietro Fiocchi	Brothers of Italy	
10	Eleonora Frigerio		
11	Franco Giancarlo		
12	Giovanna Giolitti		
13	Paolo Inselvini		
14	Lara Magoni	Brothers of Italy	
15	Mario Mantovani	Brothers of Italy	
16	Elena Nai		
17	Federica Picchi		
18	Vincenzo Sofo	Brothers of Italy	
19	Antonella Tosi		
20	Mariateresa Vivaldini		
Source: Candidates

=== North-East Italy ===
N°	Name	National party	Votes
1	Giorgia Meloni	Brothers of Italy	
2	Sergio Berlato	Brothers of Italy	
3	Alessia Ambrosi		
4	Antonella Argenti		
5	Silvia Bolla		
6	Stefano Cavedagna		
7	Alessandro Ciriani	—N/a	
8	Elena Donazzan	Brothers of Italy	
9	Guglielmo Garagnani		
10	Valeria Mantovan		
11	Maddalena Morgante		
12	Anna Olivetti		
13	Lucas Pavanetto		
14	Daniele Polato		
15	Piergiacomo Sibiano		
Source: Candidates

=== Central Italy ===
N°	Name	National party	Votes
1	Giorgia Meloni	Brothers of Italy	
2	Nicola Procaccini	Brothers of Italy	
3	Carla Cappiello		
4	Francesco Carducci		
5	Dorina Casadei	Brothers of Italy	
6	Carlo Ciccioli		
7	Civita Di Russo		
8	Mario Pellegrini		
9	Anita Privitera		
10	Maria Veronica Rossi	—N/a	
11	Antonella Sberna		
12	Marco Squarta		
13	Francesco Torselli		
14	Stefano Tozzi		
15	Manuel Vescovi		
Source: Candidates

=== Southern Italy ===
N°	Name	National party	Votes
1	Giorgia Meloni	Brothers of Italy	
2	Nicola Benedetto		
3	Ersilia Amatruda		
4	Antonio Ambrosio		
5	Marco Cerreto		
6	Nicola D'Ambrosio		
7	Luciana De Francesco		
8	Mariangela Di Biase		
9	Raffaella Docimo		
10	Ines Fruncillo		
11	Alberico Gambino		
12	Chiara Maria Gemma	Brothers of Italy	
13	Giovanna Greco		
14	Elena Marrazzi		
15	Denis Nesci	Brothers of Italy	
16	Michele Picaro		
17	Vittorio Sgarbi	Renaissance	
18	Francesco Ventola		
Source: Candidates

=== Italian Islands ===
N°	Name	National party	Votes
1	Giorgia Meloni	Brothers of Italy	
2	Salvatore Deidda		
3	Elvira Amata		
4	Massimiliano Giammusso		
5	Giuseppe Milazzo		
6	Ruggero Razza		
7	Giusi Savarino		
8	Alessia Scorpo		
Source: Candidates

== Democratic Party ==
=== North-West Italy ===
N°	Name	National party	Votes
1	Cecilia Strada	Independent	
2	Brando Benifei	Democratic Party	
3	Irene Tinagli	Democratic Party	
4	Alessandro Zan	Democratic Party	
5	Antonella Parigi		
6	Giorgio Gori	Democratic Party	
7	Eleonora Evi	Democratic Party	
8	Pierfrancesco Maran		
9	Patrizia Toia	Democratic Party	
10	Davide Mattiello		
11	Elena Accossato		
12	Emanuele Fiano	Democratic Party	
13	Monica Romano		
14	Fulvio Centoz		
15	Lucia Artusi		
16	Fabio Pizzul		
17	Donatella Alfonso		
18	Luca Jahier		
19	Paola Giudiceandrea		
20	Fabio Bottero		
Source: Candidates

=== North-East Italy ===
N°	Name	National party	Votes
1	Stefano Bonaccini	Democratic Party	
2	Annalisa Corrado	Democratic Party	
3	Ivan Pedretti		
4	Elisabetta Gualmini	Democratic Party	
5	Alessandro Zan	Democratic Party	
6	Alessandra Moretti	Democratic Party	
7	Sara Vito	Democratic Party	
8	Sara Ferrari	Democratic Party	
9	Antonio Mumolo	Democratic Party	
10	Giuditta Pini	Democratic Party	
11	Marcello Saltarelli	Volt	
12	Silvia Panini	Volt	
13	Lorenzo Gennari		
14	Paola Gazzolo	Democratic Party	
15	Andrea Zanoni	Democratic Party	
Source: Candidates

=== Central Italy ===
N°	Name	National party	Votes
1	Elly Schlein	Democratic Party	
2	Nicola Zingaretti	Democratic Party	
3	Camilla Laureti	Democratic Party	
4	Marco Tarquinio	Solidary Democracy	
5	Beatrice Covassi	Solidary Democracy	
6	Dario Nardella	Democratic Party	
7	Daniela Rondinelli	Democratic Party	
8	Matteo Ricci	Democratic Party	
9	Elena Improta		
10	Humberto Insolera		
11	Alessia Morani	Democratic Party	
12	Marco Pacciotti	Democratic Party	
13	Teresa Bartoli		
14	Antonio Mazzeo	Democratic Party	
15	Michele Franchi		
Source: Candidates

=== Southern Italy ===
N°	Name	National party	Votes
1	Lucia Annunziata	Independent	
2	Antonio Decaro	Democratic Party	
3	Pina Picierno	Democratic Party	
4	Sandro Ruotolo	Democratic Party	
5	Jasmine Cristallo	Democratic Party	
6	Francesco Forte		
7	Manola Di Pasquale		
8	Luigi Tassone		
9	Shady Alizadeh		
10	Francesco Todisco		
11	Giuseppina Paterna		
12	Nicola Campanile		
13	Annamaria Becci		
14	Massimo Schiavone		
15	Georgia Tramacere		
16	Raffaele Topo		
17	Carmela Saulino		
18	Gianmario Spada		
Source: Candidates

=== Italian Islands ===
N°	Name	National party	Votes
1	Elly Schlein	Democratic Party	
2	Antonio Nicita	Democratic Party	
3	Lidia Tilotta	Independent	
4	Pietro Bartolo	Solidary Democracy	
5	Angela Quaquero		
6	Giuseppe Lupo	Democratic Party	
7	Maria Flavia Timbro	Democratic Party	
8	Giuseppe Belvisi		
Source: Candidates

== Five Star Movement ==
The Five Star Movement selected its candidates through two ballots held on SkyVote on April 18 and 22. Party members were able to file self-nominations by April 8. On April 26, there was an additional vote to add ten candidates, including the outgoing MEPs, who did not participate in the selection process as party members but were chosen by Conte as candidates for the European elections. The ten candidates are: outgoing MEPs Maria Angela Danzì, Mario Furore and Sabrina Pignedoli; Ugo Biggeri; Martina Pluda; Carolina Morace; Pasquale Tridico; Maurizio Sibilio; Giuseppe Antoci and Cinzia Pilo.

=== North-West Italy ===
N°	Name	National party	Votes
1	Maria Angela Danzì	Five Star Movement	
2	Gaetano Pedullà	Five Star Movement	
3	Antonella Pepe	Five Star Movement	
4	Sean Sacco	Five Star Movement	
5	Ester Luisa Lanfranchi	Five Star Movement	
6	Giorgia Allario	Five Star Movement	
7	Daniela Gobbo	Five Star Movement	
8	Simone Verni	Five Star Movement	
9	Paola Mazzola	Five Star Movement	
10	Elena Calogero	Five Star Movement	
11	Isabella Parini	Five Star Movement	
12	Fabio Romano	Five Star Movement	
13	Carolina Sala	Five Star Movement	
14	Luca Colombo	Five Star Movement	
15	Fabio Aleotti	Five Star Movement	
16	Mariangela Sturaro	Five Star Movement	
17	Denis Nunga Lodi	Five Star Movement	
18	Claudio Volpe	Five Star Movement	
19	Jean François Boudard	Five Star Movement	
20	Fabrizio Bertolami	Five Star Movement	
Source: Candidates

=== North-East Italy ===
N°	Name	National party	Votes
1	Sabrina Pignedoli	Five Star Movement	
2	Ugo Biggeri	—N/a	
3	Martina Pluda	—N/a	
4	Cinzia Morsiani	Five Star Movement	
5	Paola Gori	Five Star Movement	
6	Maria Angela Ferri	Five Star Movement	
7	Giacomo Zattini	Five Star Movement	
8	Paolo Bernini	Five Star Movement	
9	Mohamad Kamel Malak	Five Star Movement	
10	Stefania Braghetta	Five Star Movement	
11	Rada Bolognesi	Five Star Movement	
12	Fulvia Panza	Five Star Movement	
13	Diego Nicolini	Five Star Movement	
14	Andrea Bardin	Five Star Movement	
15	Cesidio Antidormi	Five Star Movement	
Source: Candidates

=== Central Italy ===
N°	Name	National party	Votes
1	Carolina Morace	—N/a	
2	Dario Tamburrano	Five Star Movement	
3	Gianluca Ferrara	Five Star Movement	
4	Giovanna Basile	Five Star Movement	
5	Giusy Esposito	Five Star Movement	
6	Valentina Fazio	Five Star Movement	
7	Federica Lauretti	Five Star Movement	
8	Giuliano Pacetti	Five Star Movement	
9	Stefania Volpi	Five Star Movement	
10	Sergio Romagnoli	Five Star Movement	
11	Mirella Emiliozzi	Five Star Movement	
12	Valentina Pococacio	Five Star Movement	
13	Emanuele Ceccato	Five Star Movement	
14	Luca Alloatti	Five Star Movement	
15	Stefano Cecere	Five Star Movement	
Source: Candidates

=== Southern Italy ===
N°	Name	National party	Votes
1	Pasquale Tridico	—N/a	
2	Valentina Palmisano	Five Star Movement	
3	Mario Furore	Five Star Movement	
4	Maurizio Sibilio	—N/a	
5	Maura Sarno	Five Star Movement	
6	Danilo Della Valle	Five Star Movement	
7	Laura De Vita	Five Star Movement	
8	Valentina Corneli	Five Star Movement	
9	Gaia Silvestri	Five Star Movement	
10	Fabio Stella	Five Star Movement	
11	Lelio Mancino	Five Star Movement	
12	Giuseppe Belcastro	Five Star Movement	
13	Francesca Anna Ruggiero	Five Star Movement	
14	Felicia Gaudiano	Five Star Movement	
15	Annunziata Coppola	Five Star Movement	
16	Maria Anna Labarile	Five Star Movement	
17	Riccardo Di Palma	Five Star Movement	
18	Vincenzo Incampo	Five Star Movement	
Source: Candidates

=== Italian Islands ===
N°	Name	National party	Votes
1	Giuseppe Antoci	—N/a	
2	Cinzia Pilo	—N/a	
3	Patrizio Cinque	Five Star Movement	
4	Antonella Di Prima	Five Star Movement	
5	Virginia Farruggia	Five Star Movement	
6	Matteo Porcu	Five Star Movement	
7	Antonino Randazzo	Five Star Movement	
8	Matilde Montaudo	Five Star Movement	
Source: Candidates

== Forza Italia ==
=== North-West Italy ===
N°	Name	National party	Votes
1	Antonio Tajani	Forza Italia	
2	Letizia Moratti		
3	Paolo Damilano		
4	Massimiliano Salini		
5	Stefania Zambelli		
6	Andrea Costa	Us Moderates	
7	Roberto Cota		
8	Laura D'Incalci		
9	Firial Cherima Fteita		
10	Gustavo Gili		
11	Luigi Grillo		
12	Clara Marta		
13	Laura Menardi		
14	Dina Nobili		
15	Matteo Passoni		
16	Silvia Piani		
17	Claudia Porchietto		
18	Marco Reguzzoni		
19	Beatrice Rizzi		
20	Giuseppe Romeo		
Source: Candidates

=== North-East Italy ===
N°	Name	National party	Votes
1	Antonio Tajani	Forza Italia	
2	Sandra Savino		
3	Flavio Tosi	Forza Italia	
4	Matteo Gazzini		
5	Rosaria Tassinari		
6	Cristina Andretta		
7	Giampiero Avruscio		
8	Antonio Cenini		
9	Francesco Coppi	Us Moderates	
10	Arianna Corroppoli	Forza Italia	
11	Isabella Dotto		
12	Bruno Molea		
13	Deborah Onisto		
14	Antonio Platis		
15	Alessandra Servidori		
Source: Candidates

=== Central Italy ===
N°	Name	National party	Votes
1	Antonio Tajani	Forza Italia	
2	Francesca Peppucci	Forza Italia	
3	Salvatore De Meo	Forza Italia	
4	Alessandra Mussolini	Forza Italia	
5	Giorgio Silli	Us Moderates	
6	Marco Baldassarri		
7	Rossella Chiusaroli		
8	Graziella Ciriaci		
9	Valentina Corsetti		
10	Maria Chiara Fazio		
11	Jacopo Ferri		
12	Alessandro Ghinelli		
13	Lorenzo Grassini		
14	Tiziana Pepe		
15	Renata Polverini	Forza Italia	
Source: Candidates

=== Southern Italy ===
N°	Name	National party	Votes
1	Antonio Tajani	Forza Italia	
2	Isabella Adinolfi	Forza Italia	
3	Fulvio Martusciello	Forza Italia	
4	Alessandra Mussolini	Forza Italia	
5	Lucia Vuolo	Forza Italia	
6	Giuseppina Princi		
7	Paolo Soccorso Dell'Erba		
8	Antonella Ballone		
9	Angelo Antonio D'Agostino		
10	Laura De Mola		
11	Raffaele De Rosa		
12	Eliseo Iannini		
13	Sonia Palmeri		
14	Barbara Ricci		
15	Riccardo Rosa	Us Moderates	
16	Alessandro Sacchi		
17	Francesca Salatiello		
18	Marcello Vernola	Forza Italia	
Source: Candidates

=== Italian Islands ===
N°	Name	National party	Votes
1	Caterina Chinnici	Forza Italia	
2	Michele Cossa	Sardinian Reformers	
3	Maddalena Calia	Forza Italia	
4	Massimo Dell'Utri	Us Moderates	
5	Marco Falcone	Forza Italia	
6	Bernardette Grasso	Forza Italia	
7	Margherita La Rocca Ruvolo	Forza Italia	
8	Edmondo Tamajo	Forza Italia	
Source: Candidates

== Freedom ==
=== North-West Italy ===
N°	Name	National party	Votes
1	Cateno De Luca	South calls North	
2	Laura Castelli	South calls North	
3	Marco Mori		
4	Francesco Amodeo		
5	Enrico Bettini		
6	Lucia Corda		
7	Luigi Cosenza		
8	Sara Cunial	Vita	
9	Sergio De Caprio		
10	Roberto De Magistris		
11	Ermanno Gavazzi		
12	Francesca Gentile		
13	Silvia Martini		
14	Desiree Chiara Merlini		
15	Rosalba Pizzulo		
16	Enrico Rizzi	Rizzi (political party)	
17	Giovanni Sgroi		
18	Giovanna Stella		
19	Irene Vaccaro		
20	Cristina Zaccanti		
Source: Candidates

=== North-East Italy ===
N°	Name	National party	Votes
1	Cateno De Luca	South calls North	
2	Laura Castelli	South calls North	
3	Vito Comencini		
4	Francesco Amodeo		
5	Mauro Beccari		
6	Sara Cunial	Vita	
7	Mirko De Carli		
8	Rehana Kausar		
9	Meryem Khaioui		
10	Chiara Vanessa Michelon		
11	Cinzia Pasi		
12	Ugo Rossi	Together Free	
13	Enrico Rizzi	Rizzi (political party)	
14	Paolo Silvagni		
15	Giorgia Tripoli		
Source: Candidates

=== Central Italy ===
N°	Name	National party	Votes
1	Cateno De Luca	South calls North	
2	Laura Castelli	South calls North	
3	Sergio De Caprio		
4	Sabrina Aguiari		
5	Francesco Amodeo		
6	Maria Verita Boddi		
7	Chiara Caprioli		
8	Katia Ceccaccio		
9	Evelin Di Lupidio	Green Front	
10	Antonino Galloni	Green Front	
11	Antonio Giglioli		
12	Monica Natali		
13	Sergio Pirozzi	Civics in Movement	
14	Enrico Rizzi	Rizzi (political party)	
15	Laura Silo		
Source: Candidates

=== Southern Italy ===
N°	Name	National party	Votes
1	Cateno De Luca	South calls North	
2	Laura Castelli	South calls North	
3	Francesco Amodeo		
4	Piera Aiello		
5	Donato Amoruso		
6	Sergio De Caprio		
7	Maria Giuseppa De Donato		
8	Katia Di Lella		
9	Nicola Di Matteo		
10	Annarita Foresta		
11	Nicola Giampaolo		
12	Veronica Giannone		
13	Teofilo Migliaccio		
14	Paola Piccone		
15	Enrico Rizzi		
16	Dino Rossi		
17	Maria Sbano		
18	Severina Sena		
Source: Candidates

=== Italian Islands ===
N°	Name	National party	Votes
1	Cateno De Luca	South calls North	
2	Laura Castelli	South calls North	
3	Piera Aiello		
4	Edgardo Bandiera		
5	Giulia Ferro		
6	Barbara Figus		
7	Ismaele La Vardera		
8	Antonio Giuseppe Parrinello		
Source: Candidates

== Greens and Left Alliance ==
=== North-West Italy ===
N°	Name	National party	Votes
1	Ilaria Salis	Independent	
2	Ignazio Marino	Independent	
3	Massimiliano Smeriglio	Independent	
4	Benedetta Scuderi	Green Europe	
5	Domenico Lucano	Independent	
6	Giovanni Mori	Independent	
7	Arianna Bettin	Independent	
8	Mario Salomone		
9	Andrea John Déjanaz	Environment Rights Equality	
10	Stefano Apuzzo		
11	Andrea Cegna		
12	Daniele Cicala	Green Europe	
13	Simona Cosso		
14	Angela Fedi		
15	Erica Innisi	Green Europe	
16	Simona Merisi		
17	Chiara Minelli	RC	
18	Suad Omar Sheikh Esahaq		
19	Jessica Todaro		
20	Giorgio Vacchiano		
Source: Candidates

=== North-East Italy ===
N°	Name	National party	Votes
1	Cristina Guarda	Green Europe	
2	Domenico Lucano	Independent	
3	Brigitte Foppa	Greens	
4	Nicola Dall'Olio		
5	Jessica Veronica Cugini		
6	Alessandro Franceschini		
7	Francesca Caprini		
8	Stefano Dall'Agata		
9	Alessandra Filippi		
10	Giulia Giorgi		
11	Alessandra Mion	SI	
12	Emanuel Oian	SI	
13	Jessica Todaro	Independent	
14	Paolo Trande	SI	
15	Francesco Gonella		
Source: Candidates

=== Central Italy ===
N°	Name	National party	Votes
1	Ignazio Marino	Independent	
2	Marilena Grassadonia	SI	
3	Massimiliano Smeriglio	Independent	
4	Luca Boccoli	Green Europe	
5	Francesca Arca	Green Europe	
6	Cecilia Bassi	Independent	
7	Paola Bernasconi	Green Europe	
8	Luciano Conte	Independent	
9	Lucrezia Iurlaro	Independent	
10	Antonio Natali	Independent	
11	Christian Raimo	Independent	
12	Agnese Santarelli	SI	
13	Sabrina Santelli	Green Europe	
14	Pierluigi Vossi		
15	Sergio Ulgiati	Green Europe	
Source: Candidates

=== Southern Italy ===
N°	Name	National party	Votes
1	Domenico Lucano	Independent	
2	Rosa D'Amato	Independent	
3	Francesco Emilio Borrelli	Green Europe	
4	Anna Grazia Maraschio	SI	
5	Souzan Fatayer	Independent	
6	Fabio Armano	Green Europe	
7	Fedele Cannerozzi	SI	
8	Natale Cuccurese	Party of the South	
9	Maria Pia Funaro	Independent	
10	Giovanni Germano		
11	Francesca Imperatore	Green Europe	
12	Alessandra Mariano		
13	Anna Orabona		
14	Giulia Persico	Green Europe	
15	Gerardo Pontecorvo		
16	Valeria Spinelli	Party of the South	
17	Rosario Ternullo		
18	Sergio Ulgiati	Green Europe	
Source: Candidates

=== Italian Islands ===
N°	Name	National party	Votes
1	Leoluca Orlando	Independent	
2	Ilaria Salis	Independent	
3	Domenico Lucano	Independent	
4	Cinzia Dato		
5	Emanuele Barbara		
6	Giuliana Fiertler		
7	Francesco Muscau	Green Europe	
8	Stefania Pagliazzo		
Source: Candidates

== Italian Animalist Party–Italexit ==
=== Southern Italy ===
N°	Name	National party	Votes
1	Cristiano Ceriello		
2	Anna Casaburi		
3	Marilene Bonavita		
4	Michele Buttiglione		
5	Andrea Perillo		
6	Daniela Martani		
7	Pietro L'Erario		
8	Lucio Janniello		
9	Giovanna Mulas		
10	Ilaria Paolillo		
11	Giuseppe Gscheider		
12	Simona Casadei		
13	Sabrina Palumbo		
14	Carlo Petrelli		
15	Damiano Cristofaro		
16	Costanza Sozzi		
17	Francesco Pio Pepiciello		
18	Margherita Sammarco		
Source: Candidates

== League ==
=== North-West Italy ===
N°	Name	National party	Votes
1	Silvia Sardone	Lega	
2	Alessandro Panza	Lega	
3	Francesco Bruzzone		
4	Isabella Tovaglieri	Lega	
5	Gianna Gancia	Lega	
6	Angelo Ciocca	Lega	
7	Danilo Oscar Lancini	Lega	
8	Simona Bordonali		
9	Alessia Borroni		
10	Eraldo Botta		
11	Marco Cozzi		
12	Alessandro Fermi		
13	Dino Ganelli		
14	Elena Lucchini		
15	Giovanni Malanchini		
16	Cristina Patelli		
17	Lorenza Sotto		
18	Astrid Sento		
19	Silvana Snider		
20	Roberto Vannacci	Independent	
Source: Candidates

=== North-East Italy ===
N°	Name	National party	Votes
1	Paolo Borchia	Lega	
2	Elena Lizzi	Lega	
3	Alessandra Basso	Lega	
4	Rosanna Conte	Lega	
5	Anna Cisint		
6	Stefano Bargi		
7	Roberta Conti		
8	Arianna Lazzarini		
9	Alessandro Manera		
10	Morena Martini		
11	Emiliano Occhi		
12	Roberto Paccher		
13	Roberto Piccoli		
14	Roberto Vannacci	Independent	
15	Stefano Zannier		
Source: Candidates

=== Central Italy ===
N°	Name	National party	Votes
1	Roberto Vannacci	Independent	
2	Susanna Ceccardi	Lega	
3	Claudio Borghi	Lega	
4	Anna Cinzia Bonfrisco	Italian Liberal Right	
5	Mirco Carloni		
6	Valeria Alessandrini	Lega	
7	Mario Abbruzzese		
8	Davide Bordoni		
9	Franco Cardinale		
10	Laura Cartaginese		
11	Francesca Dionisi		
12	Anna Menghi		
13	Giovanna Miele		
14	Antonio Tacconi		
15	Matilde Tasselli		
Source: Candidates

=== Southern Italy ===
N°	Name	National party	Votes
1	Roberto Vannacci	Independent	
2	Simona Loizzo		
3	Valentino Grant	Lega	
4	Roberto Marti		
5	Aldo Patriciello	Lega	
6	Luigi Barone		
7	Laura Cucchiarella		
8	Giovanna Fiume		
9	Santo Gagliardi		
10	Marica Grande		
11	Francesca Magliano		
12	Filippo Mancuso		
13	Anna Carmela Minuto		
14	Carmela Rescigno		
15	Angela Russo		
16	Dante Santoro		
17	Joseph Splendido		
18	Matilde Tasselli		
Source: Candidates

=== Italian Islands ===
N°	Name	National party	Votes
1	Annalisa Tardino	Lega	
2	Roberto Vannacci	Independent	
3	Ester Bonafede	UDC	
4	Antonino Germanà		
5	Michelina Lunesu		
6	Francesca Reitano		
7	Raffaele Stancanelli	Lega	
8	Girolamo Turano		
Source: Candidates

== Peace Land Dignity ==
=== North-West Italy ===
N°	Name	National party	Votes
1	Michele Santoro	Independent	
2	Benedetta Sabene	Independent	
3	Raniero Luigi La Valle	Independent	
4	Ginevra Bompiani	Independent	
5	Anna Bruna Camposampiero	PRC	
6	Marina Castellano		
7	Fiammetta Cucurnia		
8	Angelo d'Orsi		
9	Federico Dolce	MERA25 Italia	
10	Tiare Gatti Mora	MERA25 Italia	
11	Maria Rita Lagostena		
12	Piergiorgio Odifreddi	Independent	
13	Bice Parodi		
14	Enrico Peyretti	Independent	
15	Giorgio Rivolta		
16	Cristian Romaniello	Independent	
17	Paolo Rossi	Independent	
18	Noor Shihadeh		
19	Elena Urgnani		
20	Nicolai Verjbitkii	Independent	
Source: Candidates

=== North-East Italy ===
N°	Name	National party	Votes
1	Raniero Luigi La Valle	Independent	
2	Benedetta Sabene	Independent	
3	Michele Santoro	Independent	
4	Khaled Al Zeer		
5	Valeria Allocati	PRC	
6	Pier-Giorgio Ardeni		
7	Ginevra Bompiani	Independent	
8	Fiammetta Cucurnia		
9	Francesco Di Matteo		
10	Dario Dongo		
11	Luigi Gallo		
12	Alessandra Guerra	Independent	
13	Paolo Rossi	Independent	
14	Electra Stamboulis	MERA25 Italia	
15	Elisa Tagliavini		
Source: Candidates

=== Central Italy ===
N°	Name	National party	Votes
1	Michele Santoro	Independent	
2	Benedetta Sabene	Independent	
3	Raniero Luigi La Valle	Independent	
4	Fabio Alberti		
5	Ginevra Bompiani	Independent	
6	Giulia Ciafrei		
7	Angelica Gatti		
8	Ali Khalil	PRC	
9	Marta Grande	Independent	
10	Roberto Mancini		
11	Elena Mazzoni	PRC	
12	Tiziano Rea		
13	Rita Scapinelli		
14	Vauro Senesi		
15	Roberta Sforza		
Source: Candidates

=== Southern Italy ===
N°	Name	National party	Votes
1	Michele Santoro	Independent	
2	Benedetta Sabene	Independent	
3	Raniero Luigi La Valle	Independent	
4	Maurizio Acerbo	PRC	
5	Giuseppe Arlacchi	Independent	
6	Ginevra Bompiani	Independent	
7	Rita Capaccio		
8	Domenico Ciruzzi		
9	Fiammetta Cucurnia		
10	Angelo d'Orsi		
11	Paolo Maria Della Ventura	MERA25 Italia	
12	Tiare Gatti Mora	MERA25 Italia	
13	Ilaria Leonardis		
14	Laura Marchetti		
15	Vito Micunco		
16	Piernicola Pedicini	M24A	
17	Rosaria Scarpulla		
18	Noor Shihadeh		
Source: Candidates

=== Italian Islands ===
N°	Name	National party	Votes
1	Michele Santoro	Independent	
2	Benedetta Sabene	Independent	
3	Raniero Luigi La Valle	Independent	
4	Federica Baccoli		
5	Ginevra Roberta Bompiani	Independent	
6	Giovanni Fresu	Liberu	
7	Antonino Mantineo		
8	Nino Mantineo		
9	Elisa Monti		
Source: Candidates

== Popular Alternative ==
=== Southern Italy ===
N°	Name	National party	Votes
1	Stefano Bandecchi	AP	
2	Donatella Paolillo		
3	Massimo Antonino Ripepi		
4	Maria Antonella Carluccio		
5	Michele Cornacchia		
6	Laura D'Esposito		
7	Roberto De Angelis		
8	Sonia Citta		
9	Antonio Cento		
10	Monica D'Aguì		
11	Antonio Pica		
12	Antonella Mancino		
13	Arnaldo Gadola		
14	Maria Petrecca		
15	Antonio De Santis		
16	Raffaella Severino		
Source: Candidates

=== Italian Islands ===
N°	Name	National party	Votes
1	Stefano Bandecchi	AP	
2	Mattia Gattuso		
3	Alfonso Alaimo		
4	Manuela Ciambrone		
5	Massimo Romagnoli		
6	Valentina Valenti		
Source: Candidates

== South Tyrolean People's Party ==
=== North-East Italy ===
N°	Name	National party	Votes
1	Herbert Dorfmann	SVP	
2	Felix Nagler	SVP	
3	Otto von Dellemann	SVP	
4	Ursula Thaler	SVP	
5	Franca Padovan	Slovene Union	
6	Roberta Bergamo	PATT	
Source: Candidates

== Sovereign Popular Democracy ==
=== Central Italy ===
N°	Name	National party	Votes
1	Marco Rizzo	Communist Party	
2	Antonella D'Angeli		
3	Francesco Toscano	Sovereign and Popular Italy Again	
4	Glauco Benigni		
5	Carla Breschi		
6	Caterina Miraglia		
7	Antonello Cresti		
8	Marianella Fioravanti		
9	Alfio Krancic		
10	Barbara Mancieri		
11	Giovanni Masotti		
12	Beatrice Spitoni		
13	Enzo Pennetta		
14	Francesca Venditti		
15	Bruno Scapini		
16	Maria Antonietta Zola		
Source: Candidates

== United States of Europe ==
=== North-West Italy ===
N°	Name	National party	Votes
1	Emma Bonino	More Europe	
2	Gianfranco Librandi	LIC	
3	Raffaella Paita	Italia Viva	
4	Marco Taradash	More Europe	
5	Paolo Giovanni Micheli		
6	Alessandro Cecchi Paone		
7	Patrizia De Grazia	Radicals	
8	Enrica Cattaneo	PSI	
9	Nadia Gallo	LDE	
10	Maria Mikaelyan		
11	Vittorio Barazzotto	Italia Viva	
12	Matteo Di Maio	More Europe	
13	Federico Rossi	Italia Viva	
14	Simona Viola	More Europe	
15	Luca Perego	LDE	
16	Davide Falteri	Italia Viva	
17	Daria De Luca	PSI	
18	Alessandra Franzi		
19	Antonella Soldo	Radicals	
20	Matteo Renzi	Italia Viva	
Source: Candidates

=== North-East Italy ===
N°	Name	National party	Votes
1	Graham Robert Watson	Liberal Democrats	
2	Antonella Soldo	Radicals	
3	Giulia Pigoni	Italia Viva	
4	Davide Bendinelli	Italia Viva	
5	Gabriella Chiellino		
6	Marco Saljihu		
7	Maria Laura Moretti	LDE	
8	Giorgio Pasetto		
9	Francesco Bragagni	PSI	
10	Marina Sorina	More Europe	
11	Luigi Giordani	PSI	
12	Fabio Valcanover	More Europe	
13	Aurora Pezzuto	LDE	
14	Nicola Cesari	Italia Viva	
15	Katya Shmorhav		
Source: Candidates

=== Central Italy ===
N°	Name	National party	Votes
1	Gian Domenico Caiazza		
2	Emma Bonino	More Europe	
3	Marietta Tidei	Italia Viva	
4	Éric Jozsef		
5	Emanuela Pistoia	LDE	
6	Rosa Maria Di Giorgi	Italia Viva	
7	Olga Surinova		
8	Gerardo Stefanelli	Italia Viva	
9	Gianluca Misuraca	More Europe	
10	Silvia Bertolucci	LDE	
11	Manuela Albertella		
12	Giuseppina Bonaviri	PSI	
13	Francesco Cappelletti	LDE	
14	Tiziano Busca	PSI	
15	Matteo Renzi	Italia Viva	
Source: Candidates

=== Southern Italy ===
N°	Name	National party	Votes
1	Enzo Maraio	PSI	
2	Manuela Zambrano	More Europe	
3	Nicola Caputo	Italia Viva	
4	Sandra Lonardo	Us of the Centre	
5	Teresa Bellanova	Italia Viva	
6	Caterina Miraglia		
7	Alfonso Maria Gallo	More Europe	
8	Emanuela Pistoia	LDE	
9	Massimiliano Stellato	Italia Viva	
10	Stefano Mascaro		
11	Adriano Pasculli de Angelis		
12	Giovanna Catacchio	PSI	
13	Giuseppe Varacalli	Italia Viva	
14	Filomena Greco		
15	Antonio Rubino	Italia Viva	
16	Claudia Eleonora Stomeo	More Europe	
17	Annunziata Paese	Italia Viva	
18	Matteo Renzi	Italia Viva	
Source: Candidates

=== Italian Islands ===
N°	Name	National party	Votes
1	Rita Bernardini	Radicals	
2	Francesco Concetta Calanna	LDE / SD	
3	Fabrizio Micari	Italia Viva	
4	Valentina Falletta	Italia Viva	
5	Luca Ballatore	PSI	
6	Pietrina Putzolu	PSI	
7	Carola Politi	More Europe	
8	Matteo Renzi	Italia Viva	
Source: Candidates

== Valdostan Rally ==
=== North-West Italy ===
N°	Name	Birthplace	Region	National party	Votes
1	Stefano Aggravi	Aosta	Vallee d'Aoste	Valdostan Rally	
2	Martina Lombard	Montjovet, Aosta	Vallee d'Aoste	Valdostan Rally	
3	Piermassimo Guarnero	Casale Monferrato, Alessandria	Piedmont	MPP	
Source: Candidates
