= Student Action (Italy) =

Far-right student movement in Italy

Student Action Azione Studentesca
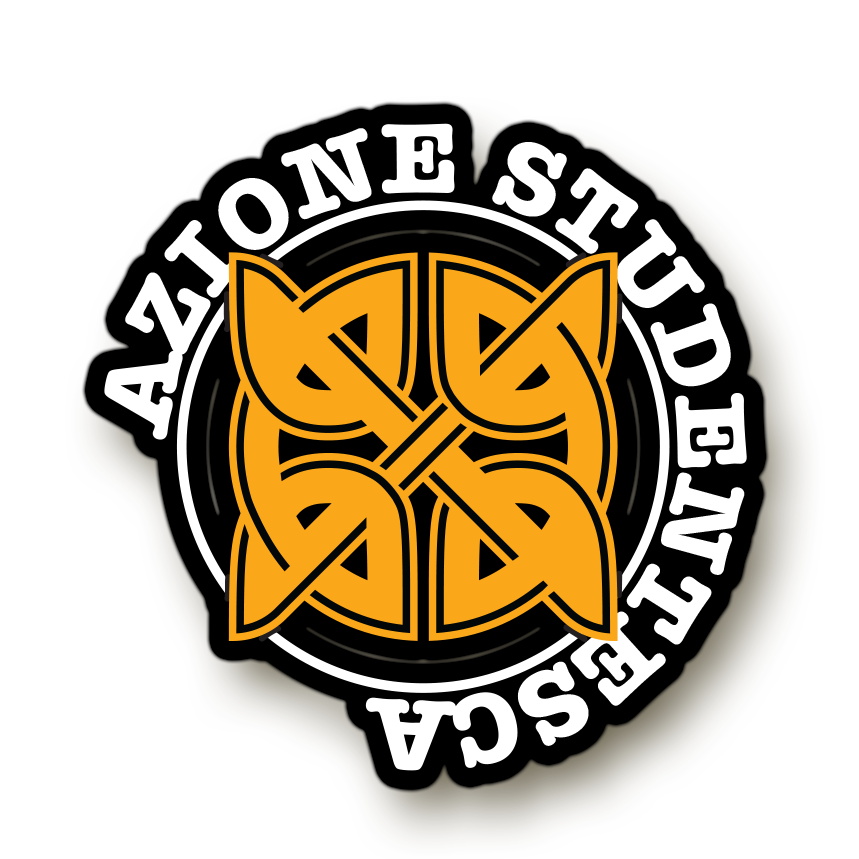
- Leader: Riccardo Ponzio
- Founded: 1996; 2016 (Refoundation)
- Dissolved: 2009 (1996 Version)
- Headquarters: Via Frusa 37, Florence
- Ideology: Italian nationalism Neo-fascism; Paternalistic conservatism Identitarianism; Traditionalist conservatism
- Position: Far-right
- Colours: Black, yellow
- Mother party: National Alliance (1996–2009); Brothers of Italy (since 2016)
- Newspaper: Agoghè
- Website: azionestudentescaofficial.com (not active)

Student Action (Azione Studentesca, AS) is a far-right student movement in Italy, formerly connected to National Alliance and since 2016 to Brothers of Italy.

== History ==
=== 1996–2009 ===
The movement was founded in 1996 by Youth Action (Azione Giovani, AS), the youth wing of National Alliance. Among the early members of the association was Giorgia Meloni, who would later become a prominent right-wing leader in Italy and eventually became Prime Minister of Italy in 2022.

The group gained notoriety when it occupied the headquarters of the Federation of Education Workers (FLC), a left-wing trade unions affiliated to the Italian General Confederation of Labour (CGIL).

After National Alliance merged with Forza Italia into The People of Freedom (PdL), Student Action was disbanded and its members joined the National Student Movement, affiliated to Young Italy, the youth wing of the PdL.

=== Relaunch in 2016 ===
Student Action was relaunched in 2016, this time affiliated with Brothers of Italy and its youth movement, the National Youth. The new group is considered to be much more radical than the original one, often openly supporting neo-fascist, identitarian, and communitarian, and paternalistic conservative positions. In 2023, six members of Azione Studentesca physically assaulted left-wing students at the high school Liceo classico statale Michelangiolo in Florence. The incident sparked a wide media and political reaction, including parliamentary questions from left-wing representatives and condemnation from Tommaso Foti, the FdI parliamentary group leader in the Chamber of Deputies.

== Symbol ==
Student Action adapted a breton cross (a variant of the Celtic cross) as its symbol in 2016. This variant derives from GRECE (in French: Groupement de recherche et d'études pour la civilisation européenne), an ethno-nationalist think-thank founded by, among others, Alain de Benoist and Dominique Venner, and a linchpin of the Nouvelle Droite political movement. In recent years it has also frequently used the lambda in its iconography, a symbol drawn from Spartan shields and revived in the political sphere in the 21st century by the Bloc Identitaire. The term "agoghè", used for the association's magazine and as the name of its summer camps, also constitutes a reference to Sparta and its educational ideal.
