= Chiara La Porta =

Italian politician (born 1991)

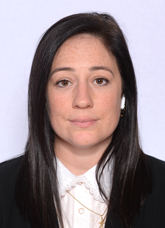
- La Porta in 2022

Member of the Regional Council of Tuscany
- Incumbent
- Assumed office 29 October 2025

Member of the Chamber of Deputies
- In office 13 October 2022 – 3 December 2025
- Constituency: Tuscany

Personal details
- Born: 7 June 1991 (age 35)
- Party: Brothers of Italy

Chiara La Porta (born 7 June 1991) is an Italian politician of Brothers of Italy who was elected as a member of the Chamber of Deputies in 2022. She has served as vice president of National Youth since 2017. In the 2025 Tuscan regional election, she ran for the Regional Council representing the Prato constituency. La Porta was elected with 7,963 votes and resigned from her seat in Parliament, being replaced by Irene Gori.

== Biography ==
She began her political activism during high school in Youth Action (Italy), the youth wing of Alleanza Nazionale, and later joined Giovane Italia, the youth wing of The People of Freedom (PdL), following Alleanza Nazionale's merger with it.

In December 2012, she took part in the split within the PdL led by Giorgia Meloni, Ignazio La Russa, and Guido Crosetto, which led to the founding of Brothers of Italy (FdI). She joined its youth organization, National Youth (Italy), and served as vice president and regional director for Tuscany within that organization.

In the 2019 local elections, she ran for a seat on the Prato City Council on the FdI ticket in support of center-right mayoral candidate Daniele Spada, but was not elected.

In the 2022 early general elections, she ran for the Chamber of Deputies (Italy) on the Fratelli d'Italia party lists in the multi-member districts of Tuscany 2 (as the lead candidate), Tuscany 1, Tuscany 3, and Umbria 1 (in second place), and was elected as a deputy in the Tuscany 1 district. During the 19th Legislature, she served on the 13th Agriculture Committee and on the Parliamentary Committee for Oversight of the Implementation of the Schengen Agreement, Oversight of Europol Activities, and Oversight and Supervision of Immigration Matters.

In the October 2025 Tuscan regional elections, she ran as a candidate in the Prato district and was elected with 7,963 votes. She therefore chose to take her seat on the Regional Council of Tuscany, and on December 3, she was replaced in the Chamber of Deputies by Irene Gori.
