= Forza Italia Giovani =

Youth wing of Forza Italia

- Chairman: Simone Leoni
- Founded: 1996
- Ideology: Berlusconism; Liberal conservatism
- Mother party: Forza Italia
- European affiliation: Youth of the European People's Party
- Website: www.forzaitaliagiovani.com

The Forza Italia Giovani (English: Forward Italy Youth) is the youth wing of Forza Italia.

== History ==
Forza Italia Giovani was created as an internal department of Forza Italia in 1996 under the leadership of Andrea Di Teodoro. In 1999 took place the fundative congress which elected Simone Baldelli as the new chairman of the organization. In a few years Forza Italia Giovani grown and became the strongest youth political movement in Italy with his strongholds in northern and southern zones of the country. In 2006 Simone Baldelli is elected to the Chamber of Deputies and Beatrice Lorenzin succeed him as leader of Forza Italia Giovani. Two years later Lorenzin became an MP as well and Francesco Pasquali was appointed as new national chairman of the organization. Following the official birth of the People of Freedom also Forza Italia Giovani was merged with Azione Giovani in order to create the new youth movement of italian centre-right: the Young Italy.

Following the reviving of Forza Italia, in 2014 also Forza Italia Giovani was brought back to life and the MP Annagrazia Calabria became the new national chairman. Armando Cesaro was named deputy leader of the organization, while Maria Tripodi became the national responsible of the organization.

In 2018 Annagrazia Calabria left the leadership of the organization and was succeeded by Stefano Cavedagna.

In 2019 Cavedagna left Forza Italia to join Brothers of Italy and on 3 August 2019 Silvio Berlusconi named Marco Bestetti as the new national chairman of Forza Italia Giovani. On 12 december 2022 MP Stefano Benigni succeeded to Bestetti as the new national chairman of the organization with Alessio Pagliacci serving as deputy chairman and Simone Leoni as national responsible of the organization.

== Leaders ==
- Andrea Di Teodoro (1996–1999)
- Simone Baldelli (1999–2006)
- Beatrice Lorenzin (2006–2008)
- Francesco Pasquali (2008–2009)

merged into Young Italy (2009-2014)

- Annagrazia Calabria (2014–2018)
- Stefano Cavedagna (2018–2019)
- Marco Bestetti (2019–2022)
- Stefano Benigni (2022-2025)
- Simone Leoni (since 2025)
