= Stefano Cavedagna =

Italian politician (born 1989)

Stefano Cavedagna MEP
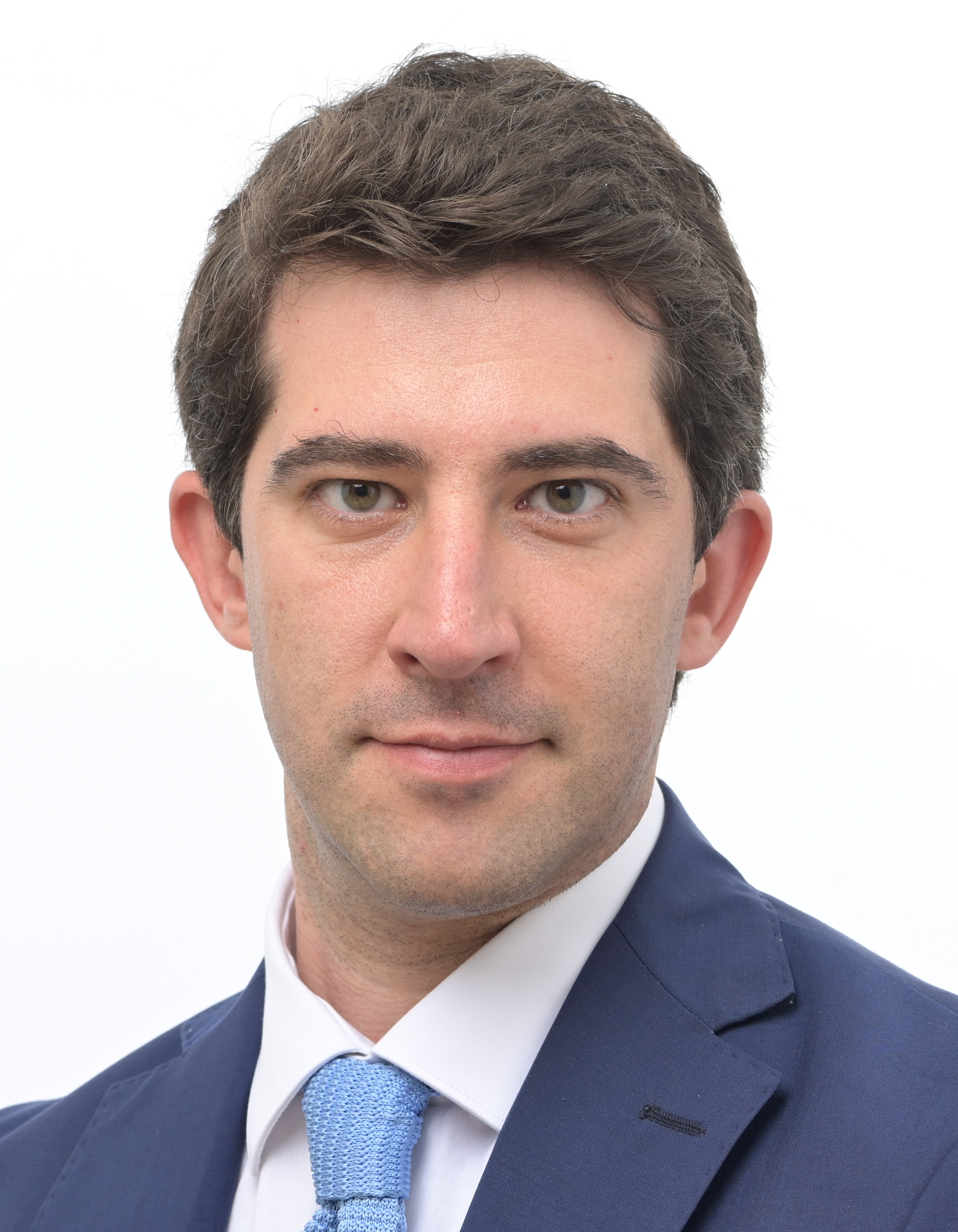
- Cavedagna in 2024

Member of the European Parliament
- Incumbent
- Assumed office 16 July 2024
- Constituency: North-East Italy

Personal details
- Born: 9 December 1989 (age 36)
- Party: Brothers of Italy
- Other political affiliations: European Conservatives and Reformists Party

Stefano Cavedagna (born 9 December 1989) is an Italian politician of Brothers of Italy who was elected member of the European Parliament in 2024.

== Early life and career ==
Cavedagna was born in Bologna.

As a high school student, Cavedagna wrote an article critical of mass killings under communist regimes in the school newspaper, which was censored by the school's principal. After an article was written about the incident in il Resto del Carlino, he was approached by Galeazzo Bignami and joined the National Alliance's youth wing Youth Action. Cavadegna left Youth Action in 2008, and joined The People of Freedom. At the age of 19 he was elected city councilor of San Lazzaro di Savena, and became group leader of The People of Freedom in the council at the age of 20. He was appointed regional coordinator of Young Italy in Bologna in 2011, and in 2014 became regional coordinator of Young Italy in Emilia-Romagna.

Cavedagna graduated from the University of Bologna with a degree in international relations, obtained a master's degree in diplomacy at the Institute for International Political Studies, and returned to the University of Bologna in 2018, where he studied European law and served on the students' representative council. In November 2018, he was elected leader of Forza Italia's youth wing Forza Italia Giovani, succeeding Annagrazia Calabria. He resigned from the position in August 2019, and became national spokesperson of National Youth a few days later. In the 2021 Bologna municipal election he was elected to the Bologna City Council, where he served as group leader of Brothers of Italy until his election to the European Parliament.
