= Abruzzo (Chamber of Deputies constituency) =

Constituency of the Italian Chamber of Deputies

- Constituency for the Chamber of Deputies
- Region: Abruzzo
- Electorate: 1,026,974 (2022)
- Major settlements: Chieti, L'Aquila, Pescara, Teramo

Current constituency
- Created: 1993
- Seats: 9
- Members: FdI (4); M5S (1); PD (1); FI (1); Lega (1); Az (1)

Abruzzo is one of the 29 constituencies (Italian: circoscrizioni) represented in the Chamber of Deputies, the lower house of the Italian parliament. The constituency currently elects 14 deputies. Its boundaries correspond to those of the Italian region of Abruzzo. The electoral system uses a parallel voting system, which act as a mixed system, with 37% of seats allocated using a first-past-the-post electoral system and 61% using a proportional method, with one round of voting.

The constituency was first established by the Mattarella law on 4 August 1993 and later confirmed by the Calderoli law on 21 December 2005 and by the Rosato law on 3 November 2017.

== Elected members ==
=== Legislature XIX (2022–current) ===
Single-member districts
| District | | | Electoral list | Deputy | Parliamentary group | | Ref. |
| N. | Name | Map | Electoral list | Deputy | At election | Current | Ref. |
|---|---|---|---|---|---|---|---|
| 01 | Chieti | | Centre-right coalition | Alberto Bagnai | | League | |
| 02 | Pescara | | Centre-right coalition | Guerino Testa | | Brothers of Italy | |
| 03 | L'Aquila | | Centre-right coalition | Giorgia Meloni | | Brothers of Italy | |
Source: Ministry of the Interior

Multi-member districts
| District | | | Party | Deputy | Parliamentary group | | Ref. |
| N. | Name | Map | Party | Deputy | At election | Current | Ref. |
|---|---|---|---|---|---|---|---|
| 01 | Abruzzo | | Brothers of Italy | Fabio Roscani | | Brothers of Italy | |
| 01 | Abruzzo | | Brothers of Italy | Rachele Silvestri | | Brothers of Italy | |
| 01 | Abruzzo | | Five Star Movement | Daniela Torto | | Five Star Movement | |
| 01 | Abruzzo | | Democratic Party | Luciano D'Alfonso | | Democratic Party | |
| 01 | Abruzzo | | Forza Italia | Nazario Pagano | | Forza Italia | |
| 01 | Abruzzo | | Action | Giulio Cesare Sottanelli | | Action | |
Source: Ministry of the Interior

=== Legislature XVIII (2018–2022) ===
Single-member districts
| District | | | Electoral list | Deputy | Parliamentary group | | Ref. |
| N. | Name | Map | Electoral list | Deputy | At election | Current | Ref. |
|---|---|---|---|---|---|---|---|
| 01 | L'Aquila | | Centre-right coalition | Antonio Martino | Forza Italia | | |
| 02 | Teramo | | Five Star Movement | Antonio Zennaro | Five Star Movement | League (Note: Deputy Antonio Zennaro left the Five Star Movement on 23 April 2020. He joined the Mixed – Popolo Protagonista – Alternativa Popolare component on 6 May 2020. He later joined the Lega group in 18 January 2021.) | |
| 03 | Pescara | | Five Star Movement | Andrea Colletti | Five Star Movement | Mixed Group — Alternativa (Note: Deputy Andrea Colletti left the Five Star Movement on 19 February 2021. He joined the Mixed – Alternativa component in 23 February 2021.) | |
| 04 | Chieti | | Five Star Movement | Daniele Del Grosso | Five Star Movement | | |
| 05 | Vasto | | Five Star Movement | Carmela Grippa | Five Star Movement | | |
Source: Ministry of the Interior

Multi-member districts
| District | | | Party | Deputy | Parliamentary group | | Ref. |
| N. | Name | Map | Party | Deputy | At election | Current | Ref. |
|---|---|---|---|---|---|---|---|
| 01 | Abruzzo – 01 | | Five Star Movement | Gianluca Vacca | Five Star Movement | | |
| 01 | Abruzzo – 01 | | Five Star Movement | Daniela Torto | Five Star Movement | | |
| 01 | Abruzzo – 01 | | Democratic Party | Camillo D'Alessandro | Democratic Party | Italia Viva (Note: Deputy Camillo D'Alessandro left the Democratic Party on 19 September 2019, and joined the Italia Viva group.) | |
| 01 | Abruzzo – 01 | | Forza Italia | Gianfranco Rotondi | Forza Italia | | |
| 01 | Abruzzo – 01 | | League | Giuseppe Ercole Bellachioma | League | | |
| 02 | Abruzzo – 02 | | Five Star Movement | Valentina Corneli | Five Star Movement | | |
| 02 | Abruzzo – 02 | | Five Star Movement | Fabio Berardini | Five Star Movement | Coraggio Italia (Note: Deputy Fabio Berardini left the Five Star Movement on 10 December 2020. He joined the Mixed – Democratic Centre component on 13 January 2021. He later joined Coraggio Italia on 27 May 2021.) | |
| 02 | Abruzzo – 02 | | Democratic Party | Stefania Pezzopane | Democratic Party | | |
| 02 | Abruzzo – 02 | | League | Luigi D'Eramo | League | | |
Source: Ministry of the Interior

=== Legislature XVII (2013–2018) ===
Multi-member districts
| Constituency | Coalition | Party | Deputy | Parliamentary group | | Ref. |
| Constituency | Coalition | Party | Deputy | At election | At dissolution | Ref. |
|---|---|---|---|---|---|---|
| Abruzzo | Italia. Bene Comune | Democratic Party | Giovanni Legnini (until 26 September 2014) (Note: Deputy Giovanni Legnini resigned from his seat on 26 September 2014, after being appointed as member of the Superior Judicial Council. His replacement was deputy Giovanni Lolli.) | Democratic Party | | |
| Abruzzo | Italia. Bene Comune | Democratic Party | Giovanni Lolli (26 September – 7 October 2014) (Note: Deputy Giovanni Lolli resigned from his seat on 7 October 2014, after being appointed as Vice President and Assessor in the Abruzzo Regional government. His replacement was deputy Gianluca Fusilli.) | Democratic Party | | |
| Abruzzo | Italia. Bene Comune | Democratic Party | Gianluca Fusilli (from 7 October 2014) | Democratic Party | | |
| Abruzzo | Italia. Bene Comune | Democratic Party | Antonio Castricone | Democratic Party | | |
| Abruzzo | Italia. Bene Comune | Democratic Party | Tommaso Ginoble | Democratic Party | | |
| Abruzzo | Italia. Bene Comune | Democratic Party | Maria Amato | Democratic Party | | |
| Abruzzo | Italia. Bene Comune | Democratic Party | Yoram Gutgeld | Democratic Party | | |
| Abruzzo | Italia. Bene Comune | Democratic Party | Vittoria D'Incecco | Democratic Party | | |
| Abruzzo | Italia. Bene Comune | Left Ecology Freedom | Gianni Melilla | Left Ecology Freedom | Article One – LeU | |
| Abruzzo | Centre-right coalition | The People of Freedom | Filippo Piccone (until 22 December 2017) (Note: Deputy Filippo Piccone resigned from his seat on 22 December 2017. His replacement was deputy Massimo Verrecchia.) | The People of Freedom | AP – CpE – NCD – NcI | |
| Abruzzo | Centre-right coalition | The People of Freedom | Massimo Verrecchia (from 22 December 2017) | AP – CpE – NCD – NcI | AP – CpE – NCD – NcI | |
| Abruzzo | Centre-right coalition | The People of Freedom | Paolo Tancredi | The People of Freedom | AP – CpE – NCD – NcI | |
| Abruzzo | Centre-right coalition | The People of Freedom | Fabrizio Di Stefano | The People of Freedom | FI – PdL | |
| Abruzzo | Five Star Movement | Five Star Movement | Gianluca Vacca | Five Star Movement | | |
| Abruzzo | Five Star Movement | Five Star Movement | Andrea Colletti | Five Star Movement | | |
| Abruzzo | Five Star Movement | Five Star Movement | Daniele Del Grosso | Five Star Movement | | |
| Abruzzo | With Monti for Italy | Civic Choice | Giulio Sottanelli | Civic Choice | NcI – SC – MAIE | |
Source: Ministry of the Interior
