= Sara Ferrari =

Sara Ferrari may refer to:

- Sara Ferrari (runner)
- Sara Ferrari (politician)
