= Fabio Roscani =

Italian politician (born 1990)

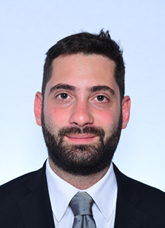
- Roscani in 2022

Member of the Chamber of Deputies
- Incumbent
- Assumed office 13 October 2022
- Constituency: Abruzzo

President of National Youth
- Incumbent
- Assumed office 24 September 2017
- Preceded by: Marco Perissa

Personal details
- Born: 3 June 1990 (age 35) Rome, Italy
- Party: Brothers of Italy

Fabio Roscani (born 3 June 1990) is an Italian politician of Brothers of Italy who was elected member of the Chamber of Deputies in 2022. He has served as president of National Youth since 2017.
