= Marco Perissa =

Italian politician (born 1982)

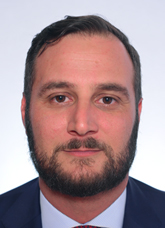
- Perissa in 2022

Member of the Chamber of Deputies
- Incumbent
- Assumed office 13 October 2022
- Constituency: Piedmont 1

President of National Youth
- In office 13 February 2014 – 24 September 2017
- Preceded by: Office established
- Succeeded by: Fabio Roscani

President of Young Italy
- In office June 2012 – December 2012
- Preceded by: Giorgia Meloni

Personal details
- Born: 22 May 1982 (age 43)
- Party: Brothers of Italy

Marco Perissa (born 22 May 1982) is an Italian politician of Brothers of Italy who was elected member of the Chamber of Deputies in 2022. He previously served as president of National Youth and Young Italy.
