= Marco Bestetti =

Italian politician (born 1987)

Member of the Regional Council of Lombardy
- Incumbent
- Assumed office 15 March 2023

Personal details
- Born: 3 November 1987 (age 38)
- Party: Brothers of Italy (since 2022)
- Other political affiliations: Forza Italia (until 2022)

Marco Bestetti (born 3 November 1987) is an Italian politician serving as a member of the Regional Council of Lombardy since 2023. From 2019 to 2022, he served as chairman of Forza Italia Giovani. From 2016 to 2021, he served as president of Zone 7 of Milan. He has been a member of Brothers of Italy since 2022 and was a member of Forza Italia until 2022.
