= Gianluca Vacca =

Italian politician (born 1973)

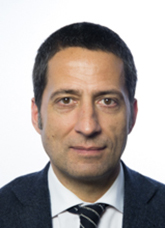
- Vacca in 2018

Member of the Chamber of Deputies
- In office 15 March 2013 – 12 October 2022
- Constituency: Abruzzo (2013–2018); Abruzzo – P01 (2018–2022)

Personal details
- Born: 3 October 1973 (age 52)
- Party: Independent (since 2022)
- Other party: Five Star Movement (2013–2022); Together for the Future (2022)

Gianluca Vacca (born 3 October 1973) is an Italian politician. From 2013 to 2022, he was a member of the Chamber of Deputies. From 2018 to 2019, he served as undersecretary of the Ministry of Culture.
