= Agorà =

- Leader: Angelo d'Orsi
- Founder: Angelo d'Orsi
- Founded: 2 June 2026
- Ideology: Socialism; Anti-capitalism; Euroscepticism; Anti-imperialism; Pacifism
- Political position: Left-wing to far-left
- Colours: Red; Purple

Website
- www.agoraitalia.org

Agorà is an Italian political party founded in 2026 on the initiative of historian and essayist Angelo d'Orsi.

The movement defines itself as a radically anti-systemic organization, characterized by a political platform based on socialism, Euroscepticism, and firm opposition to imperialism and neocon global order.

== History ==
The movement was officially launched on 2 June 2026, coinciding with the 80th anniversary of the proclamation of the Italian Republic, from an idea by Angelo d'Orsi, a former professor of History of Political Doctrines at the University of Turin and a prominent scholar of Antonio Gramsci.

At the end of June of the same year, the movement held its first National Assembly in Rome, titled "Dalla Piazza al Parlamento" (from the squares to the parliament), with the programmatic objective of federating and giving institutional representation to the social opposition and pacifist movements active in the country.

== Ideology and platform ==
The core tenets of Agorà's political manifesto primarily revolve around national sovereignty and the contestation of the Western economic and geopolitical order:

- Democratic Sovereignty and Euroscepticism: The party proposes the reclamation of Italy's full popular and economic sovereignty, outlining a plan for a managed exit from the Euro and the European Union.
- Neutrality and Withdrawal from NATO: In line with a radical interpretation of Article 11 of the Constitution of Italy (which rejects war as an instrument of offense), Agorà advocates for Italy's immediate withdrawal from NATO, opposition to rearmament, and the country's strategic neutrality.
- Multipolarism and Anti-imperialism: The movement opposes the global framework led by the US-EU-NATO bloc—which it defines as a "war system"—and rejects Israeli foreign policies. It promotes the opening to multipolar international relations, looking favorably on cooperation with BRICS nations and Russia.
- Anti-liberalism and Social Policies: On the economic front, Agorà seeks to overcome capitalism and financial deregulation through the nationalization of strategic industrial sectors, the redistribution of wealth, and the restoration of the welfare state.
- Anti-capitalist Ecologism: It supports the need for a new economic paradigm to halt the exploitation of planetary resources, linking environmental protection directly to the critique of the capitalist production system.

== See also ==
- Marxism
- Socialism
- Anti-imperialism
