= Riace =

Municipality in the Metropolitan City of Reggio Calabria

Riace Greek: Riaci
- Comune
- Comune di Riace
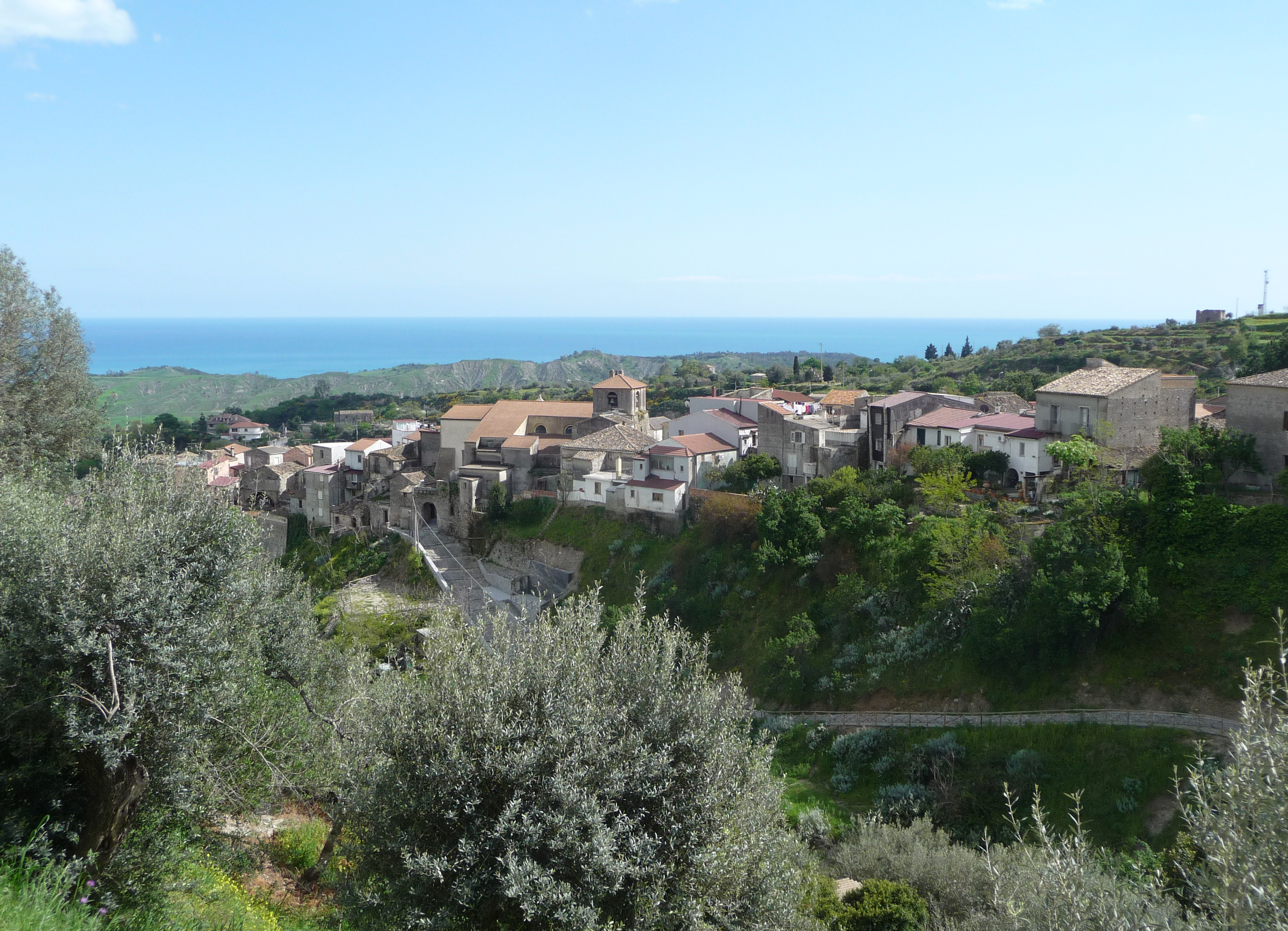

- Coat of arms

- Location within Calabria Location within Italy
- Coordinates: 38°25′05″N 16°28′52″E
- Country: Italy
- Region: Calabria
- Metropolitan city: Reggio Calabria (RC)

Government
  - Mayor: Antonio Trifoli

Area
  - Total: 16.24 km^{2} (6.27 sq mi)
- Elevation: 300 m (980 ft)

Population (30 November 2016)
  - Total: 2,343
  - Density: 144.3/km^{2} (373.7/sq mi)
- Demonym: Riacesi
- Time zone: UTC+1 (CET)
  - Summer (DST): UTC+2 (CEST)
- Postal code: 89040
- Dialing code: 0964
- Patron saint: Saints Cosmas and Damian
- Website: Official website

Riace (Calabrian: Riaci) is a comune (municipality) in the Metropolitan City of Reggio Calabria in the Italian region of Calabria, located about 50 kilometres (31 mi) south of Catanzaro and about 80 kilometres (50 mi) northeast of Reggio Calabria. Riace borders the municipalities of Camini and Stignano.

== Art ==
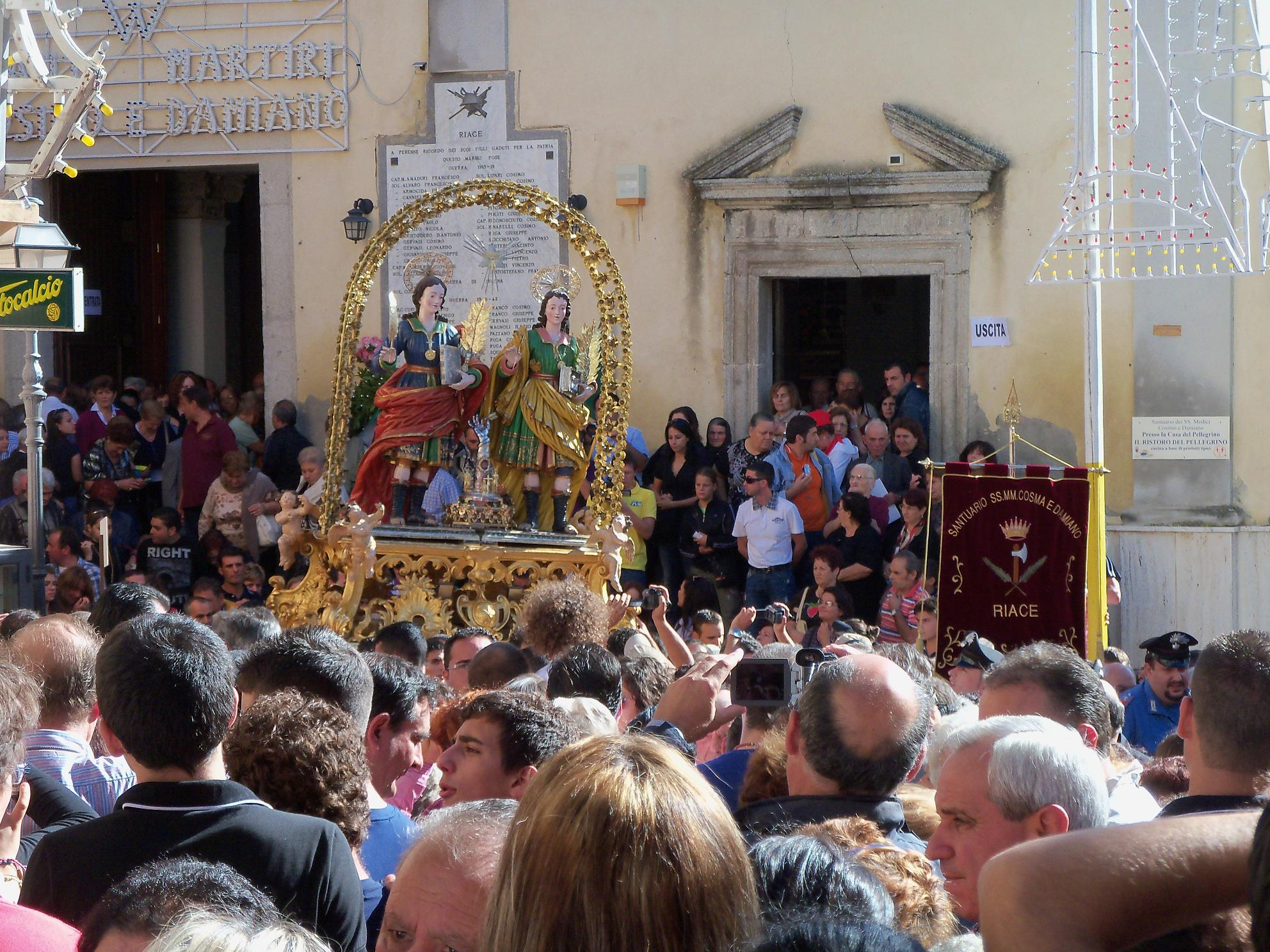
Feast of Saints Cosmas and Damian in 2010.

Riace is notable as the place where the Bronzi di Riace (Riace bronzes), bronze statues of warriors, were found in the sea in 1972. These Ancient Greek sculptures can be seen in the Museo Nazionale della Magna Grecia (National Museum of Magna Graecia, i.e. the colonies of Greater Greece) in Reggio Calabria.

== Migration policy ==
Riace attracted international attention through its policies on migrants under mayor Domenico Lucano during the European migrant crisis. As of January 2011, about 450 refugees from 20 countries had settled there among the 1,800 inhabitants, revitalising the village and preventing the closure of the village school. Lucano was ranked third in the 2010 World Mayor competition; the winner was the mayor of Mexico City, which at the time had about nine million inhabitants. He was also listed at number 40 by Fortune as one of the world's greatest leaders in 2016.

In the first-instance trial in September 2021, Lucano was sentenced to 13 years in prison for abetting illegal immigration. On appeal in October 2023, the judges dropped charges against him, ruling that his migration management model was not criminal. Lucano said a never-ending nightmare was finally over. With all charges dropped from the Locri investigation that began in 2018,

Lucano was chosen as an independent candidate for the Greens and Left Alliance in the 2024 European Parliament election in Italy; he was elected a member of the European Parliament and was also again elected mayor of Riace. In Riace, "most of [the migrants] have moved on and mostly only elderly villagers remain."

== See also ==
- Ghost town repopulation
- Vallata dello Stilaro Allaro
