= Camini =

Camini Greek: Cameno
- Comune
- Comune di Camini
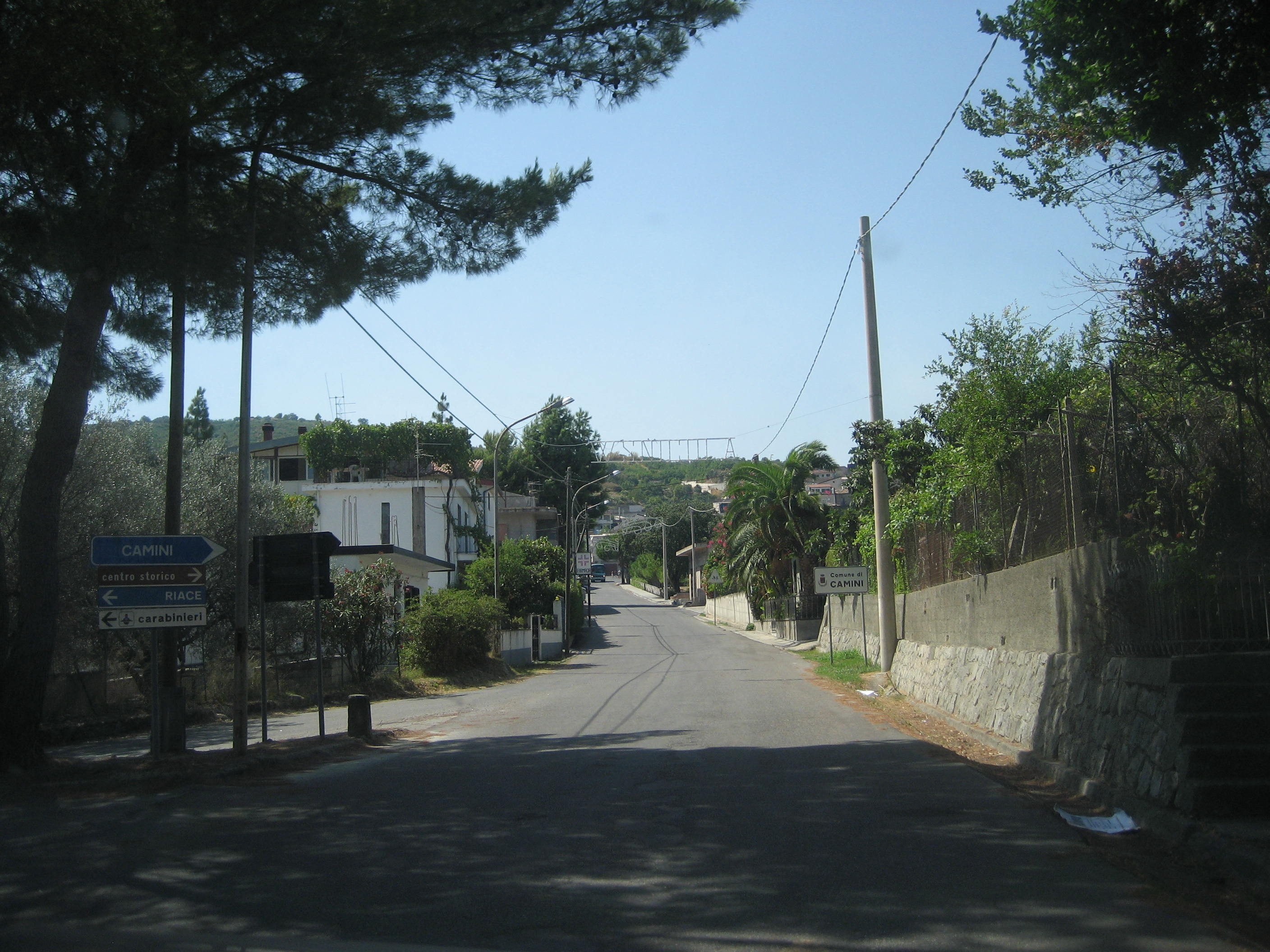

- Coat of arms

- Location within Italy Location within Calabria
- Coordinates: 38°26′N 16°29′E
- Country: Italy
- Region: Calabria
- Metropolitan city: Reggio Calabria (RC)

Government
  - Mayor: Giuseppe Alfarano

Area
  - Total: 17.2 km^{2} (6.6 sq mi)

Population (December 2007)
  - Total: 751
  - Density: 43.7/km^{2} (113/sq mi)
- Demonym: Caminesi
- Time zone: UTC+1 (CET)
  - Summer (DST): UTC+2 (CEST)
- Postal code: 89040
- Dialing code: 0964

Camini is a comune (municipality) in the Province of Reggio Calabria in the Italian region Calabria, located about 50 kilometres (31 mi) south of Catanzaro and about 80 kilometres (50 mi) northeast of Reggio Calabria.

Camini borders the following municipalities: Riace, Stignano, Stilo.

== Main sights ==
- A Turri, a 16th-century towers
- Santa Maria Assunta in Cielo, a 12th-century church with frescoes
