= Giulio Sottanelli =

Italian politician (born 1970)

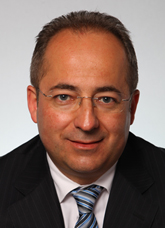
- Sottanelli in 2013

Member of the Chamber of Deputies
- Incumbent
- Assumed office 13 October 2022
- Constituency: Abruzzo – P01
- In office 15 March 2013 – 22 March 2018
- Constituency: Abruzzo

Personal details
- Born: 10 April 1970 (age 56)
- Party: Action (since 2019)

Giulio Cesare Sottanelli (born 10 April 1970) is an Italian politician. He has been a member of the Chamber of Deputies since 2022, having previously served from 2013 to 2018. From 2016 to 2018, he served as secretary of the Chamber.
