= Rachele Silvestri =

Italian politician (born 1986)

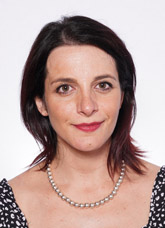
- Silvestri in 2022

Member of the Chamber of Deputies
- Incumbent
- Assumed office 23 March 2018
- Constituency: Marche (2018–2022); Abruzzo (2022–present)

Personal details
- Born: 30 August 1986 (age 39)
- Party: Brothers of Italy (since 2021)
- Other political affiliations: Five Star Movement (until 2020)

Rachele Silvestri (born 30 August 1986) is an Italian politician serving as a member of the Chamber of Deputies since 2018. She was a member of the Five Star Movement until 2020, and has been a member of Brothers of Italy since 2021.
