= Annagrazia Calabria =

Italian politician

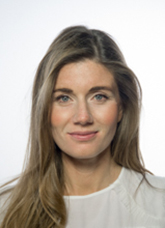

Member of the Chamber of Deputies
- In office 11 June 2008 – 13 October 2022

Personal details
- Born: 6 May 1982 (age 44) New York City, US
- Party: FI (until 2009); PdL (2009–2013); FI (since 2013)
- Education: Luiss Guido Carli
- Profession: Politician

Annagrazia Calabria (born 6 May 1982, in New York City) is an Italian politician.

She is also an American citizen, daughter of the former Finance Director of Leonardo-Finmeccanica, Luigi Calabria, and niece of the former International Head of M&A of Merrill Lynch, Carlo Calabria. Her mother, Cynthia Alfonsi, is the regional coordinator of the women's organisation of Forza Italia since the 1990s, and Annagrazia was attended in the party's miniclub in Rome.

== Biography ==
After studying law at LUISS University, she was an intern at Allen & Overy law firm in Rome.

In 2001, at the age of 19, she ran for municipal councillor for the municipality of Rome, obtaining only 135 preference votes.

She was a candidate in the 2008 general election on the People of Freedom list. Thanks to the election of Gianni Alemanno as mayor of Rome in 2008, she took his place in the Parliament at the age of 26, becoming the youngest Italian MP.

On 17 December 2010, she was appointed coordinator of Young Italy, the youth branch of the People of Freedom.

In the parliamentary election of February 2013, she was re-elected to the Chamber of Deputies. On 16 November 2013, with the dissolution of the PdL, she joined Forza Italia. On 24 March 2014, she became a member of the Presidential Committee of Forza Italia.

In the 2018 parliamentary elections, she was re-elected to the Chamber of Deputies, in the uninominal college of Rome-Castel Giubileo, supported by the centre-right coalition. She became vice president of the Constitutional Affairs Commission. On 11 November 2018, she left the leadership of the youth movement of Forza Italia to Stefano Cavedagna.
