= Nino Galloni =

Italian economist

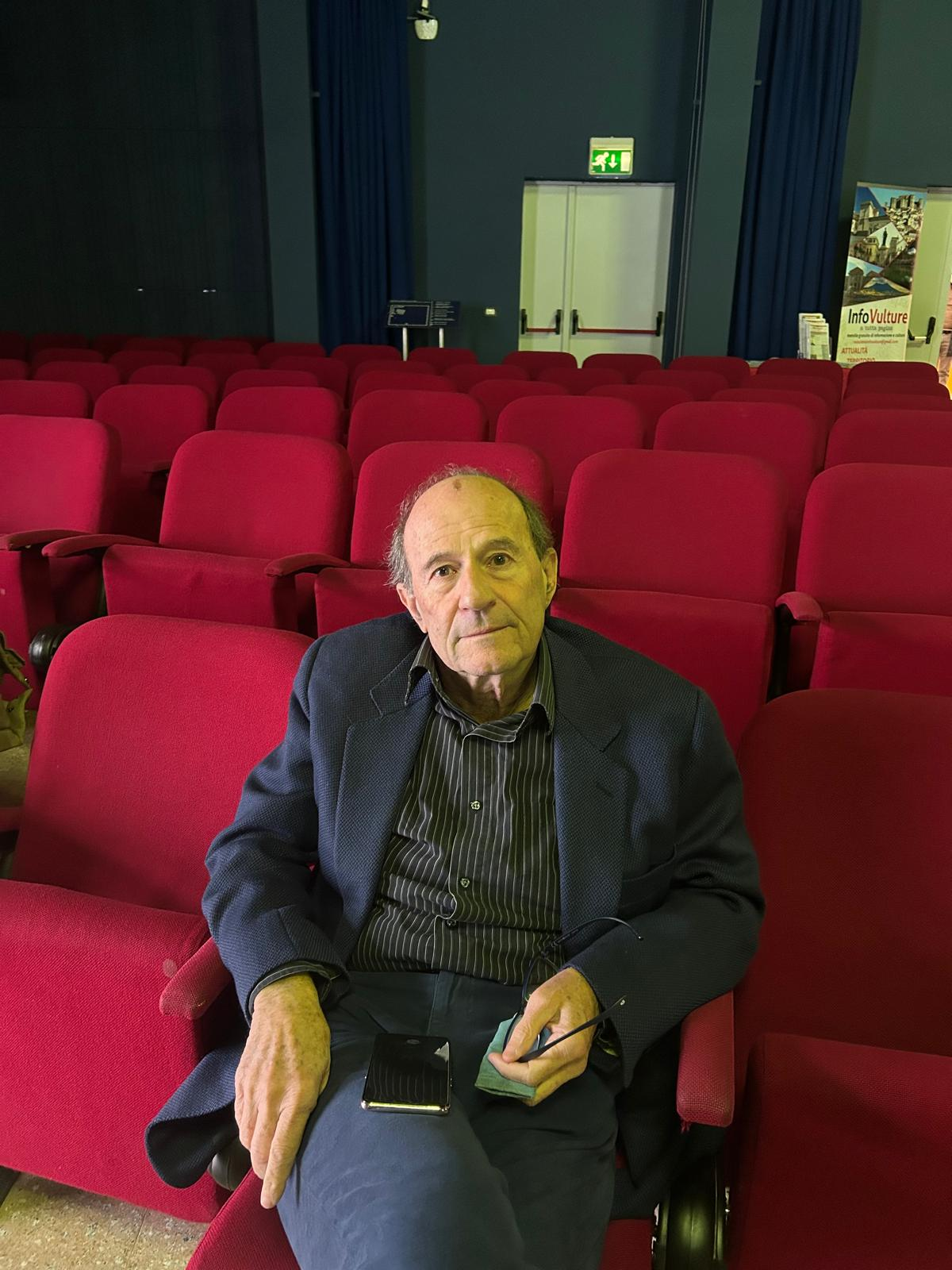
- Galloni in 2026.
- Born: 17 March 1953 (age 73); Rome
- Education: Sapienza University of Rome
- Scientific career
- Fields: International economics Economic growth Mathematical economics
- Workplaces: Università Cattolica del Sacro Cuore

Nino Galloni (born 17 March 1953) is an Italian economist.

== Career ==
After graduating in Law, he was a researcher at the University of California, Berkeley. He then held numerous positions in Italy, including Director general of the Ministry of Labor. He collaborated with economist Federico Caffè.

== Sports career ==
Galloni has a long-standing background as a competitive middle-distance runner, active from 1968 to 2012. In 1987, he was also a starting athlete for the Lazio Triathlon team.

He participated in the 2003 World Masters Athletics Championships in Puerto Rico in the M50 category, being eliminated in the semi-finals of the 100 m hurdles (0.914 m hurdles) and not finishing the final of the 3000 m steeplechase.

== Selected works ==
Nino Galloni is a highly prolific author, with works ranging from academic essays from the late 1970s to more recent publications on monetary sovereignty and post-capitalism.

In total, Galloni has written over 25 books. His bibliography can be divided into several phases:

=== Early Works (1979–1989) ===
During this period he focused on the history of capitalism and economic policy:

- Galloni, Nino (1979). Momenti del capitalismo nordamericano. 1881–1885. Milan: Giuffrè. ISBN 9788814035616.
- Galloni, Nino (1979). Il New Deal tra capitalismo e socialismo. Rome: Bulzoni.
- Galloni, Nino (1981). Crisi e adattamento. Rome: Bulzoni.
- Galloni, Nino (1984). Industria, società e mutamento tecnologico. Rome: Edizioni Lavoro. ISBN 9788879100410.
- Galloni, Nino (1989). La moneta al servizio dell'uomo. Rome: Koinè.

=== The Critical Phase and Money (1990-2010) ===
The analysis of monetary systems and the effects of globalization begins:

- Galloni, Nino (1992). La rivoluzione della moneta. Rome: Editori Riuniti. ISBN 9788835935919.
- Galloni, Nino (1998). L'occupazione tradita. Rome: Editori Riuniti. ISBN 9788835944324.
- Galloni, Nino (2007). Il grande mutuo. Le ragioni profonde della prossima crisi finanziaria. Rome: Editori Riuniti. ISBN 9788835959953.
- Galloni, Nino; Della Luna, Marco (2008). La moneta copernicana. I falsi limiti dello sviluppo, i veri fondamenti della sovranità. Monselice: Nexus Edizioni. ISBN 9788889983119.
- Galloni, Nino (2010). Prendi i tuoi soldi e... scappa? La fine della globalizzazione. Rome: Koinè Nuove Edizioni. ISBN 9788889828113.

=== Recent Works and Popularization (2011 - 2026) ===
In recent years, he has published texts related to the crisis of capitalism and new visions of economics:

- Galloni, Nino (2013). Moneta e società. Milan: Edizioni Sì. ISBN 9788895577715.
- Galloni, Nino (2015). L'economia imperfetta. Catastrofe del capitalismo o rivincita del lavoro?. Milan: Novecento Editore. ISBN 9788899316204.
- Galloni, Nino (2019). L'altra moneta. Womanesimo e natura. Geraci Siculo: Edizioni Arianna. ISBN 9788899981792.
- Galloni, Nino (2019). L'inganno e la sfida. Orbassano: Uno Editori. ISBN 9788833800264.
- Galloni, Nino (2020). Come è stata svenduta l'Italia. Milan: Byoblu. ISBN 9788894548235.
- Galloni, Nino (2020). Il superamento del capitalismo. Il mondo post-angloamericano. Bologna: Arianna Editrice. ISBN 9788865883082.
- Galloni, Nino (2022). La rivolta delle coscienze. Siamo troppi, inutili e dannosi?. Milan: Byoblu. ISBN 9791280657091.
- Galloni, Nino (2022). Economia quantistica, irrazionalità e coscienza. Milan: Byoblu. ISBN 9791280657190.
- Galloni, Nino (2026). Il superamento del capitalismo. Bologna: Arianna Editrice. ISBN 9788865883082.
