= National Youth (Italy) =

Youth wing of the Brothers of Italy party

National Youth Gioventù Nazionale
- President: Fabio Roscani
- Vice President: Chiara La Porta
- Founded: 5 May 2014
- Headquarters: Rome
- Ideology: National conservatism Right-wing populism Radical right
- Mother party: Brothers of Italy
- Magazine: MaGNete
- Website: gioventunazionale.it

National Youth (Italian: Gioventù Nazionale; GN) is the youth wing of Brothers of Italy (FdI). It was founded on 5 May 2014.

== History ==
National Youth was founded on 5 May 2014 under the presidency of Marco Perissa. On 24 September 2017, National Youth held its first National Congress and changed its leadership, with Fabio Roscani replacing Marco Perissa as National President.

After Giorgia Meloni of FdI became Prime Minister of Italy in October 2022, on one hand it was accredited in the National Youth Council on whose website the logo of the Presidency of the Council of Ministers stood out and the participants to the more respectable Fenix Generation; on the other hand, there are Italian fascist nostalgic who took part in white supremacist rallies organized by neo-Nazi groups, where they praised the racist slogan White Lives Matter, the ethno-nationalist theory of blood and soil, and sang excerpts from the Gesta Bellica dedicated to the SS and to its commander Erich Priebke, who was the executioner of the Fosse Ardeatine.

In July 2024, Fanpage.it published an undercover investigation into the organisation's Roman section, in which members of National Youth were filmed chanting fascist slogans, singing fascist songs and performing fascist salutes. Such actions were reported to have been privately encouraged within the organisation, while also publicly discouraged in order to avoid being caught by the media.

== Political positions ==
On its official web page, National Youth states that it believes in the primacy of the spirit over matter and in the Christian roots of Europe (being Eurosceptic and against the Maastricht Treaty), and it is opposed to abortion. It says that it is in favour of meritocracy but also social justice. National Youth supports the overcoming of the dichotomy between the political left and right in favour of the national interest. The movement also carries out campaigns related to schools, university, and youth employment.

National Youth engaged in political campaigns related to the radical right and social right; it conducted campaigns and demonstrations in opposition to dismissals facilitated by the Workers' Statute reform, and to modifications to wealth calculation methods. The organization also engaged in political campaigns and statements in support to the preservation of Italian and Christian identity, traditions and roots: it supported the exhibition of the Nativity scene in schools, against same-sex parenting, drug liberalization and consummation, and against illegal immigration. Keeping in line with other Italian right-wing and far-right youth organizations, National Youth claims political and moral links with the Italian Youth Front and with its activists who were murdered during the Years of Lead.

== Organization ==
The movement is headed by the National President. As of 2021, the National President is Fabio Roscani. In order to assist the national president, there is an Office of the President, which consists of four members. They are Francesco Di Giuseppe, Chiara La Porta, Mario Pozzi, and Stefano Cavedagna.
