= Angelo d'Orsi =

Italian historian and academic

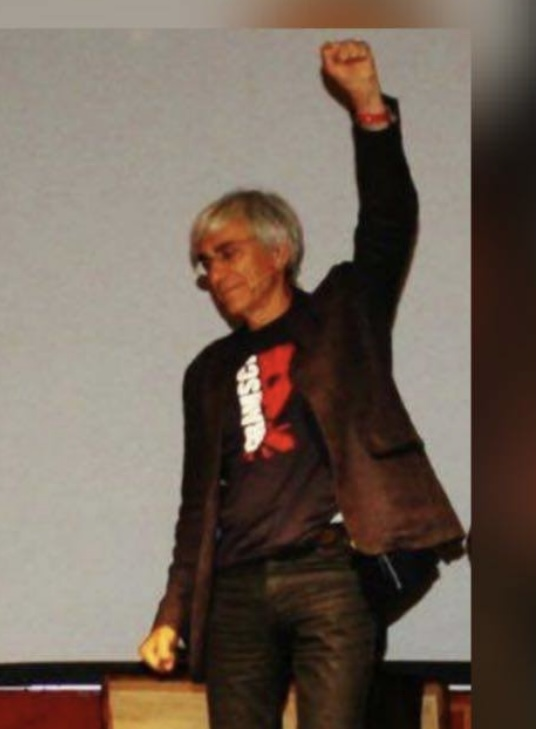
- Angelo d'Orsi speaking at an assembly
- Born: 1 January 1947 (age 79); Pontecagnano Faiano, Italy
- Citizenship: Italian

Academic background
- Education: University of Turin
- Thesis: (1972)
- Doctoral advisor: Norberto Bobbio

Academic work
- Discipline: History of political thought, history of historiography
- Institutions: University of Turin
- Main interests: Antonio Gramsci, militarism, pacifism, nationalism, Futurism, Fascism
- Notable works: Gramsci. Una nuova biografia

Angelo d'Orsi (born 1 January 1947) is an Italian historian, journalist, and former professor of the history of political doctrines at the University of Turin. He is a prominent scholar of Antonio Gramsci and contemporary political movements. In 2026, he transitioned into active politics by founding the left-wing movement Agorà.

== Biography ==
Born in the province of Salerno, d'Orsi migrated with his family to Turin in the late 1950s. He completed his studies there, graduating in philosophy in 1972 under the supervision of Norberto Bobbio. In 1980, he was awarded a fellowship by the Luigi Einaudi Foundation. By that time, he had already published his first books and was actively involved in left-wing independent journalism, remaining independent of specific political parties or extra-parliamentary groups.

He pursued an academic career at the University of Turin, serving as an assistant, researcher, associate professor, and ultimately full professor of the History of Political Doctrines until his retirement in 2017. His research focused on militarism, pacifism, nationalism, Futurism, Fascism, contemporary conflicts, and European intellectuals, with a particular specialization in Antonio Gramsci. He also worked extensively on historical methodology and the history of historiography.

D'Orsi has served on the scientific committees of various academic journals and founded several publications, including Nuova Sinistra. Appunti torinesi (1971–1974), Nuvole (1991), Quaderni di Storia dell'Università di Torino (1996–2001), Historia Magistra. Rivista di storia critica (2009–present), and Gramsciana. Rivista internazionale di studi su Antonio Gramsci (2015–present). He also established the cultural festival FestivalStoria in 2003.

As a journalist, he collaborated with major Italian newspapers, including Il Sole 24 Ore, Corriere della Sera, La Stampa, and Il Fatto Quotidiano. In March 2022, in open disagreement with La Stampa's editorial line regarding the Russian invasion of Ukraine, he chose to sever his ties with the newspaper. He similarly ended his collaborations with MicroMega and Il Manifesto, focusing his writing on Il Fatto Quotidiano and increasing his presence on television, radio, and online platforms. He runs a personal political and cultural blog titled "Istruitevi, Agitatevi, Organizzatevi" (Educate yourselves, Agitate yourselves, Organize yourselves), adopting Gramsci's famous slogan. In 2018, he also authored and staged a theatrical play titled Un Gramsci mai visto (A Gramsci Never Seen Before).

== Political career ==
In 2021, d'Orsi ran for mayor in the Turin municipal elections, heading a coalition of radical left-wing parties including Potere al Popolo! and the Communist Refoundation Party. He received 2.5% of the vote.

In the 2022 Italian general election, he ran for the Chamber of Deputies as a lead candidate for the People's Union coalition in Turin, but the list failed to cross the electoral threshold.

During the 2024 European Parliament election, he ran as a candidate for Michele Santoro's anti-war list, Peace Earth Dignity, in the Northwest and Southern constituencies, receiving around 3,700 personal preference votes; however, the list reached only 2.2% nationally, failing to clear the 4% threshold.

In June 2026, he founded his own anti-systemic political movement named Agorà.

== Selected works ==
- La macchina militare. Le forze armate in Italia, Milan, Feltrinelli, 1971.
- La polizia. Le forze dell'ordine italiano, Milan, Feltrinelli, 1972.
- La rivoluzione antibolscevica. Fascismo, classi, ideologie (1917–1922), Milan, FrancoAngeli, 1985.
- L'ideologia politica del futurismo, Turin, Il Segnalibro, 1992.
- La cultura a Torino tra le due guerre, Turin, Einaudi, 2000. ISBN 978-88-06-13867-7.
- Intellettuali nel Novecento italiano, Turin, Einaudi, 2001. ISBN 978-88-06-15888-0.
- I chierici alla guerra. La seduzione bellica sugli intellettuali da Adua a Baghdad, Turin, Bollati Boringhieri, 2005. ISBN 978-88-339-1624-8.
- Guernica, 1937. Le bombe, la barbarie, la menzogna, Rome, Donzelli, 2007. ISBN 978-88-6036-192-9.
- Il Futurismo tra cultura e politica. Reazione o rivoluzione?, Rome, Salerno Editrice, 2009. ISBN 978-88-8402-652-1.
- L'Italia delle idee. Il pensiero politico in un secolo e mezzo di storia, Milan, Bruno Mondadori, 2011. ISBN 978-88-6159-497-5.
- 1917. L'anno della rivoluzione, Rome-Bari, Laterza, 2016. ISBN 978-88-581-2612-7.
- Gramsci. Una nuova biografia, Milan, Feltrinelli, 2017 (expanded edition 2018). ISBN 978-88-07-89134-2.
- L'intellettuale antifascista. Ritratto di Leone Ginzburg, Vicenza, Neri Pozza, 2019. ISBN 978-88-545-1903-9.
- Gramsci. La biografia, Milan, Feltrinelli, 2024. ISBN 978-88-07-10579-1.
- Catastrofe neoliberista. Il regime che ha devastato le nostre vite, Rome, L.A.D. Edizioni, 2025. EAN 9791281995017.
