= Valentina Corneli =

Italian politician (born 1986)

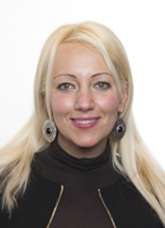

Member of the Chamber of Deputies
- In office 19 March 2018 – 12 October 2023
- Parliamentary group: Five Star Movement
- Constituency: Abruzzo

Personal details
- Born: 13 March 1986 (age 40) Giulianova, Italy
- Occupation: Politician; Lawyer

Valentina Corneli (born 13 March 1986) is an Italian politician and lawyer.

== Career ==
Corneli was born on 13 March 1986 in Giulianova, in the Abruzzo region. She has a PhD in constitutional law.

A member of the Five Star Movement, Corneli was elected to the Chamber of Deputies in the 2018 Italian general election.
