= Alessia Ambrosi =

Italian politician (born 1982)

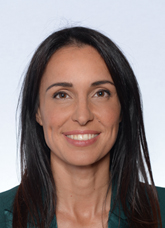
- Ambrosi in 2022

Member of the Chamber of Deputies
- Incumbent
- Assumed office 13 October 2022
- Constituency: Trentino-Alto Adige/Südtirol

Personal details
- Born: 14 April 1982 (age 44)
- Party: Brothers of Italy

Alessia Ambrosi (born 14 April 1982) is an Italian politician of Brothers of Italy who was elected member of the Chamber of Deputies in 2022. From 2018 to 2022, she served in the Regional Council of Trentino-Alto Adige/Südtirol.
