= Souzan Fatayer =

Palestinian-Italian academic and activist (born 1965)

- سوزان فطاير
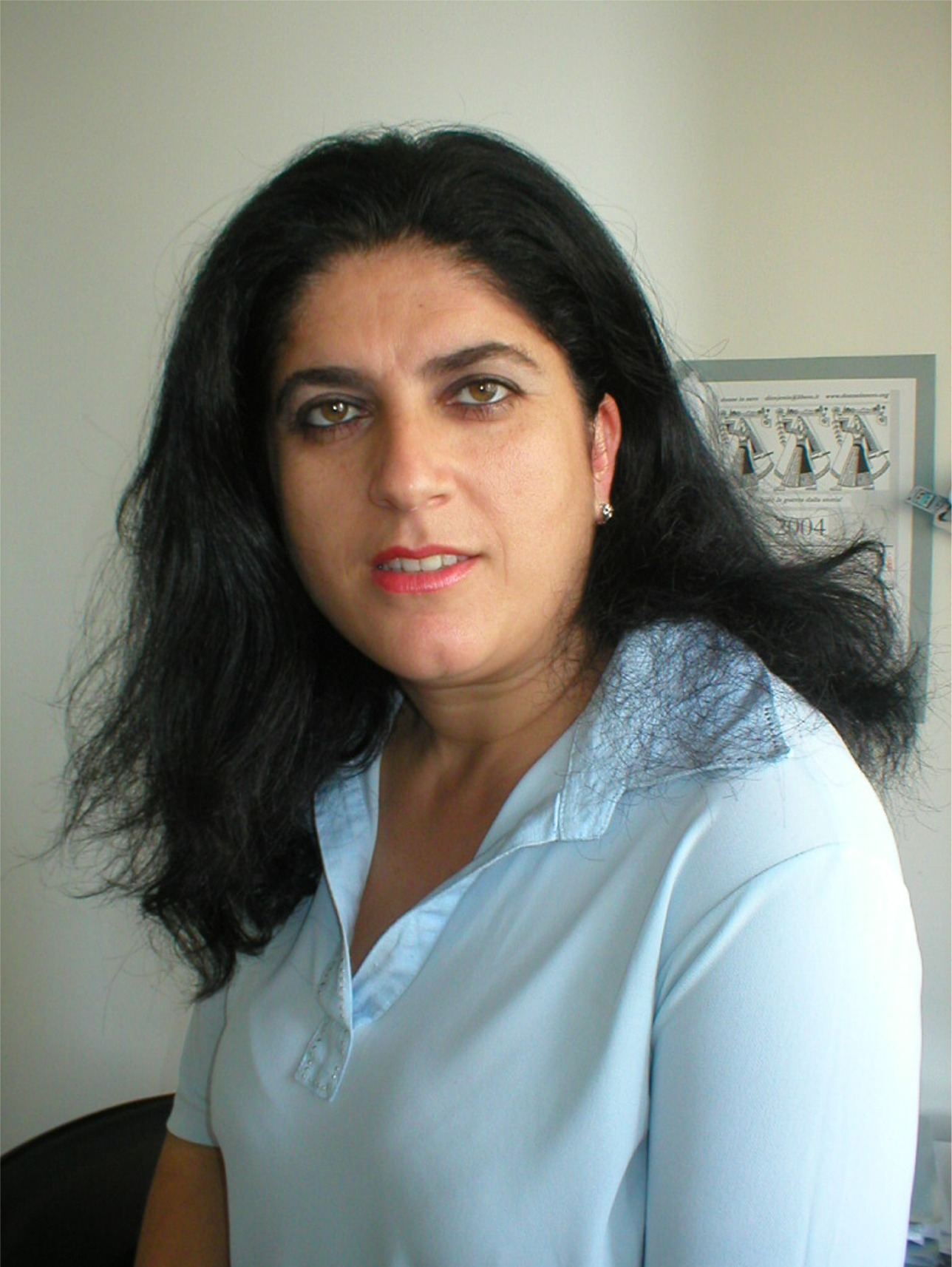
- Fatayer in 2005
- Born: Souzan Ezz Fatayer; 1 January 1965 (age 61); Nablus, Jordanian-annexed West Bank
- Other name: Susan
- Citizenship: Italy; Jordan
- Education: University of Naples Federico II
- Occupations: Translator; interpreter; academic; activist
- Employers: University of Naples "L'Orientale"; University of Macerata
- Political party: AVS

Souzan Ezz "Susan" Fatayer (Arabic: سوزان عز فطاير, romanized: Sūzān ʿIzz Faṭāyir; born 1 January 1965) is a Palestinian-Italian translator, interpreter, academic and activist.

== Early life and education ==
Fatayer was born in Nablus, West Bank, to a Palestinian father and an Italian mother from Abruzzo who had met in Brazil, and was raised in her birth city. In 1984, she moved to Naples, Italy, where she graduated in Economics and Business at the Federico II University and then devoted herself to archival practices for historical documentation.

== Career and activism ==
Fatayer has worked in several fields, including as a cultural mediator – chiefly in hospitals – and lecturer on the Israeli–Palestinian conflict, focusing on her personal experience with Israel's human rights violations against Palestinians and more recently on the Gaza war and genocide. As part of the Naples-based Fondazione Mediterraneo, Fatayer was a mediator during an official visit to Rome by the President of the Palestinian Authority Yasser Arafat in June 1998. In 2002, she was part of the first trip to Nablus by a municipal delegation from Naples, which set the ground for a twinning relation between the cities beginning the following year.

She has been an expert collaborator of Arabic language at the University of Naples "L'Orientale" since 2013 and the University of Macerata since 2008, and also briefly worked at the universities of Florence and Venice.

Fatayer is also active in social and humanitarian initiatives. Among her activities, she has been involved with Women in Black, as well as with a project to treat Palestinian and Iraqi children with heart conditions, coordinated between the regional authorities of Campania, the Palestinian Medical Relief Society and the Red Cross. For her efforts, she was awarded the prizes Una donna per la pace ("A Woman for Peace") by the municipality of Naples in 2003 and Campania per la pace e i diritti umani ("Campania for Peace and Human Rights") by the region in 2005.

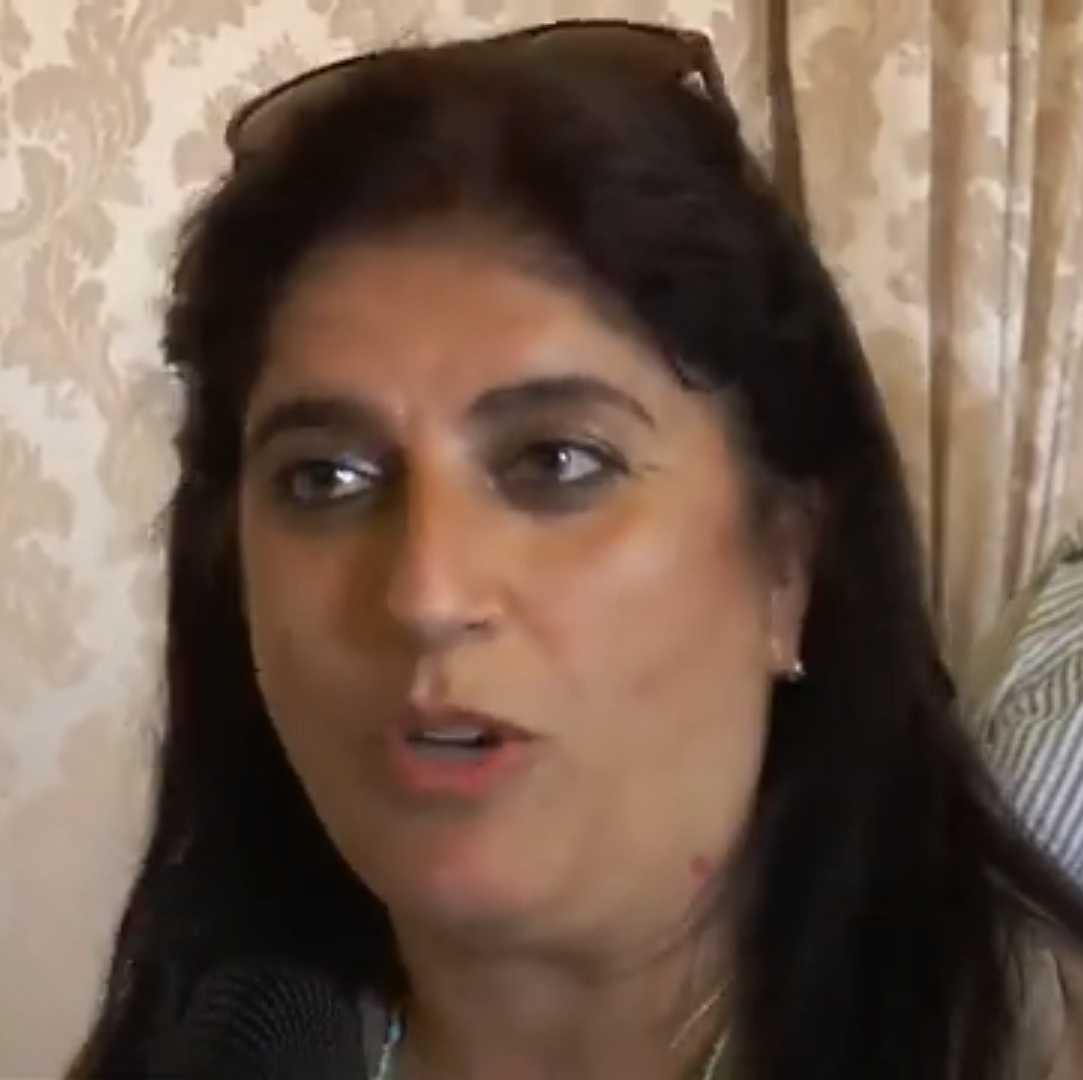
Fatayer in 2014

In June 2024, Fatayer was one of the Greens and Left Alliance (AVS) candidates in the European Parliament election for Southern Italy, ultimately coming third in her list with 23,532 votes and failing to be elected. She later unsuccessfully ran for a seat in the regional council of Campania during the November 2025 regional election, also with AVS.

== Controversy ==
Fatayer's candidacy in the 2024 European elections received criticism from opponents, particularly Brothers of Italy (FdI), for her outspokenness about abuses by the IDF and for comparing Zionists to Nazis, which led some FdI members to define her as an antisemite.

On the occasion of the 2025 regional elections, she was again the object of critical and offensive remarks, with journalist Paolo Mieli calling her "overweight" – in contrast with the victims of the Gaza Strip famine – and claiming that she "glorifies Hamas" on a Radio 24 broadcast. Several AVS members, including senator Peppe De Cristofaro, as well as trade union CGIL, variously denounced Mieli's words as a form of bodyshaming, racism, sexism or genocide denial; Fatayer herself found the comments sexist and said that he should be suspended from his professional order. The following day, Mieli apologized for "making inappropriate irony" and for misrepresenting her campaign. Fatayer was also criticized by newspaper Il Tempo for sharing a video from a Facebook page in which former Israeli ambassador to Italy Dror Eydar invoked the "need to destroy Gaza"; the post's caption expressed regret for "Hitler's incomplete mission". The director of the Jewish Brigade Museum in Milan demanded that her party withdraw her from its electoral lists; AVS leader Angelo Bonelli commented that, while the official lists were yet to be published, the words in the post were not Fatayer's and she might have overlooked them before sharing it.

The day before the election, Fatayer lamented that her private address had been published on social media platform TikTok, fearing potential harm for herself or her family. Her party expressed solidarity towards her, denouncing "incitement" and a "climate of hatred".

== Bibliography ==
- "Ala Abu Dheer, Brūšīdā, marra uḫrā (Procida nuovamente)". Orientalia Parthenopea (in Italian). XIV: 101–106. 2014. ISSN 1972-3598.
- "Madre mia, O amore passionale del poeta Ṭalʿat Suqayriq". Archivi di studi indo-mediterranei (in Italian). VI. 2016. ISSN 2279-8803.
- With Ruocco, Monica; D'Anna, Luca (2022). Comunicare in arabo – هيّا بنا!. Studi orientali (in Italian and Arabic). Vol. I. Milan: Hoepli. ISBN 978-88-360-9910-8.
- With Ruocco, Monica; Potenza, Daniela; Eid, Mohamed Ahmed Mohamed Hussein (2023). Comunicare in arabo – هيّا بنا!. Studi orientali (in Italian and Arabic). Vol. II. Milan: Hoepli. ISBN 978-88-203-9913-9.
- La tregua – Il commovente pensiero del poeta e critico palestinese Akram Assorani (1982–) (in Italian). 19 January 2025.
- Translations for Nicosia, Aldo, ed. (2025). Ho ancora le mani per scrivere: Testimonianze dal genocidio a Gaza (in Italian). Città di Castello: Edizioni Q. ISBN 978-88-978-31587.
- With Borriello, Domenico (2025). La collana di Yāsmīn (in Italian). Casalnuovo di Napoli: Iod Edizioni. ISBN 979-12--815-61540.
