= Daniela Torto =

Italian politician (born 1985)

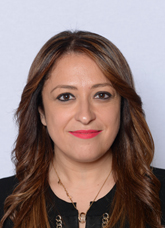
- Torto in 2022

Member of the Chamber of Deputies
- Incumbent
- Assumed office 23 March 2018
- Constituency: Abruzzo – P01 (2018–2022); Abruzzo – P01 (2022–present)

Personal details
- Born: 18 August 1985 (age 40)
- Party: Five Star Movement

Daniela Torto (born 18 August 1985) is an Italian politician serving as a member of the Chamber of Deputies since 2018. She has served as group leader of the Five Star Movement in the budget, treasury and planning committee since 2022.
