= Irene Gori =

Italian politician (born 1980)

Member of the Chamber of Deputies
- Incumbent
- Assumed office 3 December 2025

Personal details
- Born: 30 September 1980 (age 45) Pistoia, Tuscany, Italy
- Party: Brothers of Italy

Irene Gori (born 30 September 1980) is an Italian politician serving as a member of the Chamber of Deputies since 3 December 2025. She previously served as a municipal councillor in Quarrata.
