= Domenico Lucano =

Italian politician (born 1958)

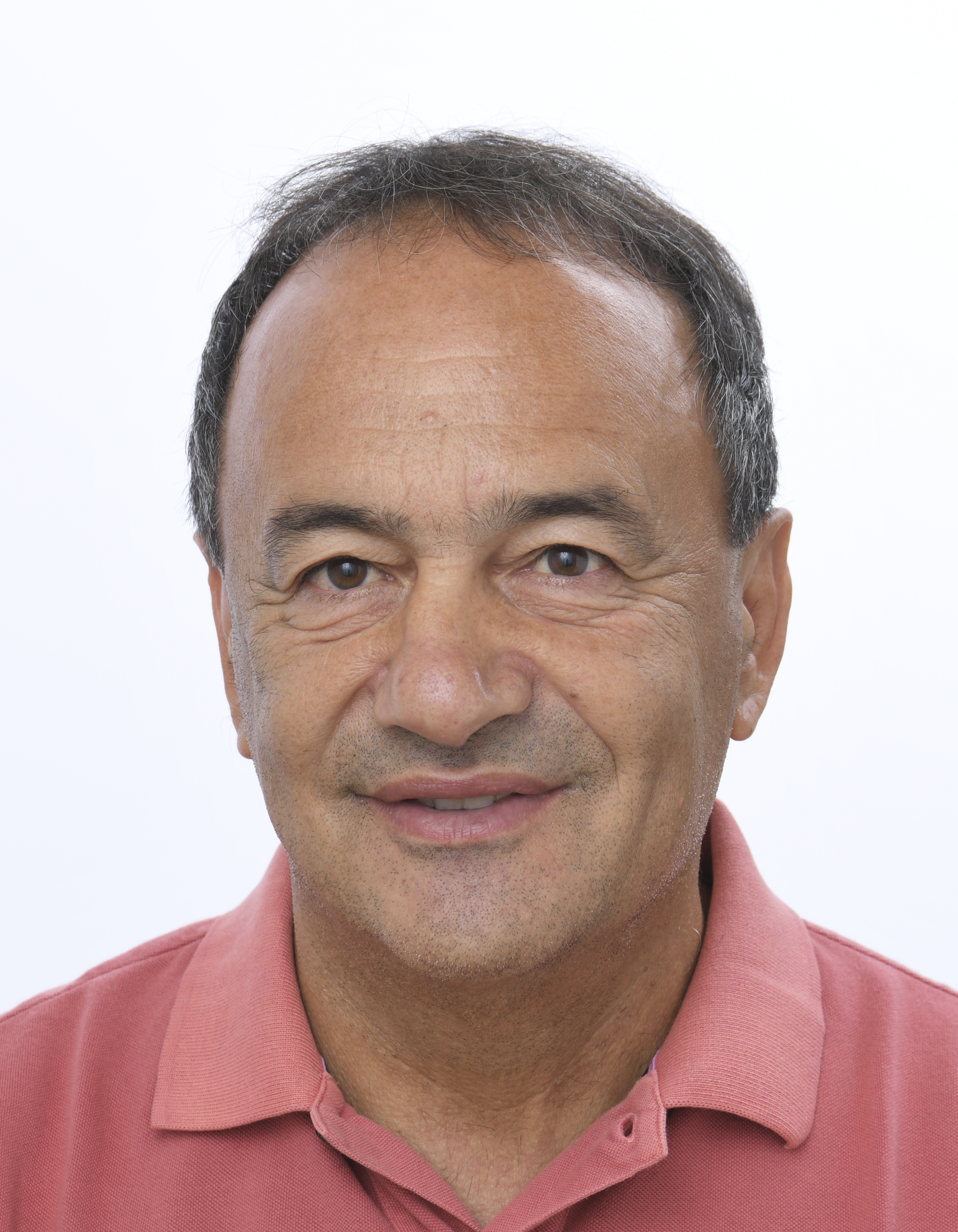
- Official portrait, 2024

Mayor of Riace
- Incumbent
- Assumed office 10 June 2024
- Preceded by: Antonio Trifoli
- In office 12 June 2004 – 3 October 2018
- Preceded by: Cosimo Salvatore Comito
- Succeeded by: Antonio Trifoli

Member of the European Parliament for Southern Italy
- Incumbent
- Assumed office 16 July 2024

Personal details
- Born: 31 May 1958 (age 68) Melito di Porto Salvo, Italy
- Party: AVS (2024–present); The Left (2024–present)
- Other political affiliations: Independent (until 2024)
- Spouse: Anna
- Children: 3
- Occupation: Politician

Domenico "Mimmo" Lucano (born 31 May 1958) is an Italian former teacher and politician who served as the mayor of Riace between 2004 and 2018 and again since 2024, and was elected a member of the European Parliament in 2024. As a mayor, he attracted international attention for his open migration model.

After the first-instance trial had sentenced him 13 years and 2 months in prison, which was controversial and much debated, he was acquitted of most of the charges on appeal, with the judges ruling that his migration management model was not criminal. He was the successful left-wing independent candidate within the Greens and Left Alliance electoral list for the 2024 European Parliament election.

== Early life ==
Lucano was born in Melito di Porto Salvo but moved early in his life to Riace, both being in the Southern Italy region of Calabria. He obtained a high school degree in chemistry qualifying him as operator in the chemical sector and then moved to Rome in Lazio to study medicine; he remained there for four years, then decided to abandon his studies and return to Calabria.

He became a practical high school teacher in chemical laboratory activities, a profession he practiced first in Rome, then in Bussoleno, in the Piedmont region, whilst living in Santena in the province of Turin.

== Career ==
Lucano worked as a teacher for most of his adult life, and started his career a human rights activist since the late 1980s and early 1990s. Lucano began to take an interest in the migrant reception methods adopted in Badolato in 1987, and as a free citizen, together with other citizens of Riace, he welcomed some Kurds who landed on the coasts of Riace on 1 July 1998. Lucano became mayor of Riace in 2004, maintaining the role since then. In 2009, shortly after his first re-election as mayor, Lucano was shot at through the window of a restaurant and two of his dogs were poisoned and killed. He gained international recognition for settling refugees in his village, which was experiencing population decline. In the context of the European migrant crisis, he also gained worldwide attention through his innovative approach to dealing with refugees. As mayor of Riace, Lucano allowed 450 refugees to settle among the 1,800 inhabitants of the village, revitalising it and preventing the closure of the local school.

With all charges dropped from the Locri investigation that began in 2018, Lucano was chosen as an independent candidate for the Greens and Left Alliance in the 2024 European Parliament election in Italy. Selected as candidate in all European Parliament constituencies in Italy except for Central Italy, he was elected obtaining over 190,000 preferences, with 22,500 votes in Calabria and 6,500 votes in the province of Reggio Calabria; with over 76,000 votes in the Southern Italy constituency, he was the most voted for the Greens and Left Alliance, and was one of four Calabrians elected to the European Parliament. He was also again elected mayor of Riace, with 46.3 percent of the votes, ahead of Francesco Salerno (34.9 percent) and the then incumbent mayor Antonio Trifoli (18.7 percent). As a newly elected member of the European Parliament and as an alternative to the rise of the far right, especially in France and Germany, Lucano called to "relaunch our experiment in Europe for a new impulse to welcome [migrants] and peace", and said that his first priority would be "to insist on social and economic development for fragile areas such as Calabria".

== Honours ==
Lucano was ranked third in the 2010 World Mayor competition; the winner Marcelo Ebrard was the mayor of Mexico City, which at the time had about nine million inhabitants. He was also listed at number 40 by Fortune as one of the world's greatest leaders in 2016. In 2017, he was awarded the Dresden Peace Prize. (Note: For the announcement of Lucano's win, see "Dresden's peace prize goes to Italy". Friedenspreis Dresden. 12 February 2017. Archived from the original on 5 February 2023. For a list of the prize winners, see "Laureates – Dresden-Preis". Friedenspreis Dresden. 2017. Archived from the original on 5 February 2023.)

== Trials ==
In October 2018, the Italian police put Lucano under house arrest for allegedly helping illegal migrants to stay in the country by organising marriages of convenience. In April 2019, Lucano was indicted with other 26 people on charges of abuse of power and aiding illegal immigration. In the same month, he faced another probe regarding alleged false public statements and fraud. In September 2021, in the first-instance trial, (Note: According to the Italian law, which has three degrees of judgment and follows the "presumption of innocence" principle, a defendant is "not guilty" until the sentence "becomes final". A defendant has the right to all three levels of judgment (Court, Court of Appeal, and Supreme Court of Cassation) and to advance, in any level, a request for a constitutional complaint. They also have the right to go to supranational courts, such as the Court of Justice of the European Union and the European Court of Human Rights, to stand up for their reasons. See "Presunzione di non colpevolezza". Treccani (in Italian). 2013.) Lucano was sentenced to 13 years and 2 months in prison for aggravated fraud, embezzlement, forgery, and abuse of office crimes, further aggravated by the criminal conspiracy with his partner Tesfahun Lemlem and several figureheads "in order to continue to enrich themselves, exploiting the migrants".

In motivating the sentence, the judges spoke of facade and appearance. The sentence was nearly double the 7 years and 11 months requested by the prosecution. Public opinion on the sentence was divided, with voices on the left considering it politically motivated. In October 2023, this was reduced to 1 year and 6 months on appeal and the jail-related sentence was suspended; Lucano was convicted for forgery and abuse of office, and acquitted of the most serious charges. The Court of Appeal declared some wiretaps "unusable" and some crimes prescripted. In motivating the sentence on appeal, which overturned the first-instance trial, the judges ruled that Lucano's mission was "to fuel an economy of hope" and "to help the most disadvantaged". According to the judges, who spoke of an "indisputable intent of solidarity", Lucano "never thought of making money from refugees". After the ruling that acquitted him and dropped the charges, Lucano said a never-ending nightmare was finally over. In February 2025, the Supreme Court of Cassation uphold the 18 months prison sentence against Lucano (suspended sentence, according to the Italian Code of Criminal Procedure) and the non-usability of the wiretaps.

In October 2024, Lucano was convicted by the Court of Auditors in Catanzaro for tax damage of 780 thousand euro along with others. For the judges, his conduct demonstrates "a clear intent to unfairly enrich private interests".

== Personal life ==
Lucano has three children.
