= Simone Baldelli =

Italian politician

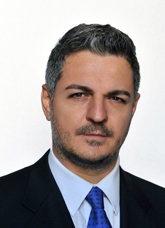

Vice-President of the Chamber of Deputies
- In office 25 September 2013 – 22 March 2018
- President: Laura Boldrini

Member of the Chamber of Deputies
- In office 28 April 2006 – 12 October 2022

Personal details
- Born: 25 October 1972 (age 53) Rome, Italy
- Party: Forza Italia (since 2013)
- Other political affiliations: PSI (till 1994); FI (1998-2009); PdL (2009-2013)
- Education: University of Camerino
- Occupation: Journalist, legislator

Simone Baldelli (born 25 October 1972) is an Italian politician from Forza Italia. He has been a member of the Chamber of Deputies from 2006 to 2022.
