= Young Italy (2009) =

Young Italy Giovane Italia
- Chairperson: Giorgia Meloni (2009–2012); Marco Perissa (2012); Annagrazia Calabria (2012–2014)
- Founded: 9 April 2009
- Merger of: Youth Action; Forza Italia – Young People for Freedom
- Dissolved: 2014
- Succeeded by: Forza Italia Giovani
- Ideology: Liberal conservatism National conservatism
- Mother party: The People of Freedom
- European affiliation: Youth of the European People's Party

The Young Italy (Italian: Giovane Italia, GI) was the youth wing of The People of Freedom (PdL), a political party in Italy.

== History ==
Young Italy was founded on 9 April 2009 from the merger of "Forza Italia – Young People for Freedom" (the youth wing of Forza Italia) and Youth Action (youth wing of the National Alliance). Giorgia Meloni, former president of Youth Action, became the new president of the merged organisation, while Francesco Pasquali (former Coordinator of Forza Italia – Young People for Freedom) became its National Coordinator. Giovanni Donzelli, president of University Action, assumed instead the position of national spokesperson for the organization.

On 25 November 2010, the national coordinator of Young Italy, Francesco Pasquali, resigned to join Future and Freedom, a breakaway party of PdL led by Gianfranco Fini. On 17 December 2010, the president of the PdL Silvio Berlusconi appointed the MP Annagrazia Calabria as new coordinator.

On 15 June 2012, the former Minister of Youth Giorgia Meloni resigned from the presidency of Youth Italy, describing the decision as an obligatory choice for generational change. Marco Perissa became the new president of the movement.

In December 2012 some leaders of Young Italy, such as Perissa, Carolina Varchi, Augusta Montaruli and Carlo Fidanza, left the organisation (and the PdL) to join Brothers of Italy, a new party founded by Giorgia Meloni. At the helm of Young Italy remained the coordinator Annagrazia Calabria.

In 2014 Young Italy was replaced by Forza Italia Giovani, as the PdL itself was replaced by the refounded Forza Italia.
