= Sara Ferrari (politician) =

Italian politician (born 1971)

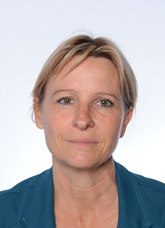
- Ferrari in 2022

Member of the Chamber of Deputies
- Incumbent
- Assumed office 13 October 2022
- Constituency: Trentino-Alto Adige/Südtirol

Personal details
- Born: 5 January 1971 (age 55)
- Party: Democratic Party

Sara Ferrari (born 5 January 1971) is an Italian politician of the Democratic Party who was elected member of the Chamber of Deputies in 2022. From 2008 to 2022, she served in the Provincial Council of Trentino.

== Biography ==
From 2005 to 2008, she served as a city councilor in Trento.

From 2008 to 2022, she served on the Council of the Autonomous Province of Trento and on the Regional Council of Trentino-Alto Adige. From 2013 to 2018, she served as provincial councilor for Universities, Research, Equal Opportunity, Youth Policy, and Development Cooperation in Ugo Rossi administration.

In the elections of September 25, 2022, she ran as a candidate in the single-member district of Trento with the center-left coalition, receiving 31.80% of the vote but losing to Andrea de Bertoldi of the center-right, who received 40.92%, and in the multi-member district of Trentino-Alto Adige on the PD-IDP list, where she was elected. She subsequently became secretary of the Democratic Party – Democratic and Progressive Italy caucus in the Chamber of Deputies, PD caucus leader in the bicameral commission of inquiry on femicide and all forms of gender-based violence, and chair of the Italy-Pakistan parliamentary friendship group.

In May 2024, during the 2024 European Parliament election, she was nominated as a candidate on the PD’s slate for the northeastern district.
