= Youth Action (Italy) =

Youth Action Azione Giovani
- Founded: 1996
- Dissolved: 2009
- Ideology: National conservatism Nationalism; Conservatism
- Mother party: National Alliance

Youth Action (Italian: Azione Giovani, AG) was the youth wing of National Alliance.

== History ==
Following the "Svolta di Fiuggi" in January 1995 which led to the birth of the National Alliance, in July 1996 a national congress was organized in Rieti in which the representatives of the Youth Front and the National Action University Front, or the organizations historical youth teams of the Italian Social Movement. The student association Fare Fronte and the new youth clubs adhering to the National Alliance, but which did not come from the MSI tradition, also took part.

During this congress the themes already expressed in Fiuggi were resumed and expanded and the decision was reached to merge the various youth groups participating in a new youth movement called Youth Action. The association was structured in Student Action, which operated in high schools, and University Action, active in universities.

The young Sicilian regional deputy Basilio Catanoso was elected president, who in that congress won against Alberto Arrighi.

In February 2002 Catanoso resigned and Gianfranco Fini, president of National Alliance, appointed a "National Regency Committee" of Youth Action, composed of Giorgia Meloni (coordinator), Nicola Caldarone (spokesman), Francesco Grillo and Emanuela Altilia. Nicola Caldarone was subsequently replaced by Carlo Fidanza.

The last congress in order of time took place on 27 and 28 March 2004 in Viterbo, where Giorgia Meloni was elected president of the movement.

The organization in 2009 merged into Young Italy, the youth wing of The People of Freedom.

== Leadership ==
- Basilio Catanoso (1995 – 2002)
- Regency committee; Giorgia Meloni, Nicola Caldarone/Carlo Fidanza, Francesco Grillo and Emanuela Altilia (2002 – 2004)
- Giorgia Meloni (2004 – 2009)
