= List of members of the Senate of Italy, 2018–2022 =

List of Italian senators

This is a list of the 320 members of the 18th legislature of the Italian Senate. They were elected in the 2018 Italian general election and assumed office on 16 March 2018. The term ended with the 2022 general election.

== Seat division ==
Group	Seats			Group leader
Group	After election	Current		Group leader
Five Star Movement (M5S)	109 / 320 (34%)	74 / 321 (23%)	▼35	Ettore Antonio Licheri
League – Salvini for Premier – Sardinian Action Party (Lega)	58 / 320 (18%)	64 / 321 (20%)	▲6	Massimiliano Romeo
Forza Italia Berlusconi for President – UDC (FI–UDC)	61 / 320 (19%)	49 / 321 (15%)	▼12	Anna Maria Bernini
Democratic Party (PD)	52 / 320 (16%)	38 / 321 (12%)	▼14	Simona Malpezzi
Brothers of Italy (FdI)	18 / 320 (6%)	21 / 321 (7%)	▲3	Luca Ciriani
Italia Viva – PSI (IV–PSI)	—N/a	17 / 321 (5%)	New	Davide Faraone
For the Autonomies (Aut)	8 / 320 (3%)	8 / 321 (2%)	Steady	Julia Unterberger
Mixed Group (Mixed)	12 / 320 (4%)	47 / 321 (15%)	▲35	Loredana De Petris
Non-Inscrits (N-I)	2 / 320 (0.6%)	2 / 321 (0.6%)	Steady	—N/a
Total	320	320	▲0	

== Bureau ==
Office	Senator	Term	Group
President	Maria Elisabetta Alberti Casellati	23 March 2018 – present	FI–UDC
Vice Presidents	Roberto Calderoli	28 March 2018 – present	Lega
Vice Presidents	Ignazio La Russa	28 March 2018 – present	FdI
Vice Presidents	Paola Taverna	28 March 2018 – present	M5S
Vice Presidents	Anna Rossomando	28 March 2018 – present	PD
Quaestors	Antonio De Poli	28 March 2018 – present	FI–UDC
Quaestors	Paolo Arrigoni	28 March 2018 – present	Lega
Quaestors	Laura Bottici	28 March 2018 – present	M5S
Secretaries	Paolo Tosato	28 March 2018 – present	Lega
Secretaries	Francesco Giro	28 March 2018 – present	FI–UDC
Secretaries	Michela Montevecchi	28 March 2018 – present	M5S
Secretaries	Sergio Puglia	28 March 2018 – present	M5S
Secretaries	Giuseppe Pisani	28 March 2018 – present	M5S
Secretaries	Francesco Laforgia	11 April 2018 – present	Mixed
Secretaries	Meinhard Durnwalder	11 April 2018 – present	Aut
Secretaries	Nadia Ginetti	6 February 2020 – present	IV–PSI
Secretaries	Salvatore Margiotta	26 May 2021 – present	PD
Secretaries	Paola Binetti	26 May 2021 – present	FI–UDC
Secretaries	Tiziana Nisini (former)	28 March 2018 – 24 February 2021	Lega
Secretaries	Vincenzo Carbone (former)	28 March 2018 – 30 June 2020	IV–PSI (Note: Until 30 June 2020 in the FI–UDC group.)
Secretaries	Gianluca Castaldi (former)	28 March 2018 – 12 September 2019	M5S

== Forza Italia–Union of the Centre ==
=== President ===
- Anna Maria Bernini

=== Deputy Vice-President ===
- Lucio Malan

=== Vice-Presidents ===
- Adriano Galliani
- Maria Alessandra Gallone
- Gabriella Giammanco
- Massimo Mallegni
- Giuseppe Mangialavori
- Giuseppe Moles
- Maria Rizzotti
- Licia Ronzulli

=== Treasurer ===
- Gilberto Pichetto Fratin

=== Members ===
- Enrico Aimi
- Elisabetta Casellati
- Francesca Alderisi
- Alberto Barachini
- Antonio Barboni
- Francesco Battistoni
- Roberto Berardi
- Sandro Biasotti
- Paola Binetti
- Giacomo Caliendo
- Fulvia Michela Caligiuri
- Andrea Cangini
- Luigi Cesaro
- Stefania Craxi
- Franco Dal Mas
- Dario Damiani
- Antonio De Poli
- Domenico De Siano
- Claudio Fazzone
- Massimo Ferro
- Emilio Floris
- Maurizio Gasparri
- Francesco Maria Giro
- Barbara Masini
- Alfredo Messina
- Anna Carmela Minuto
- Fiammetta Modena
- Nazario Pagano
- Urania Papatheu
- Adriano Paroli
- Marco Perosino
- Antonio Saccone
- Renato Schifani
- Salvatore Sciascia
- Giancarlo Serafini
- Marco Siclari
- Laura Stabile
- Maria Virginia Tiraboschi
- Roberta Toffanin
- Luigi Vitali

== Brothers of Italy ==
=== President ===
- Luca Ciriani

=== Deputy Vice-President ===
- Isabella Rauti

=== Members ===
- Antonio Balboni
- Claudio Barbaro (from 9 December 2020)
- Nicola Calandrini (from 20 March 2019)
- Andrea De Bertoldi
- Luca De Carlo (from 5 October 2020)
- Tiziana Carmela Rosaria Drago (from 18 March 2021)
- Giovanbattista Fazzolari
- Daniela Garnero Santanchè
- Antonio Iannone
- Patrizio Giacomo La Pietra
- Ignazio La Russa
- Gianpietro Maffoni (from 12 July 2018)
- Gaetano Nastri
- Giovanna Petrenga (from 2 July 2019)
- Massimo Ruspandini
- Achille Totaro
- Adolfo Urso
- Francesco Zaffini

== Italia Viva–P.S.I. ==
=== President ===
- Davide Faraone

=== Deputy Vice-President ===
- Laura Garavini

=== Vice-President ===
- Giuseppe Luigi Salvatore Cucca (from 9 November 2020)

=== Secretary ===
- Daniela Sbrollini

=== Treasurer ===
- Francesco Bonifazi

=== Members ===
- Teresa Bellanova
- Vincenzo Carbone (from 1 July 2020)
- Donatella Conzatti
- Nadia Ginetti
- Leonardo Grimani
- Ernesto Magorno
- Mauro Maria Marino
- Riccardo Nencini
- Annamaria Parente (from 7 October 2020)
- Matteo Renzi
- Valeria Sudano
- Gelsomina Vono

== Lega Nord–Sardinian Action Party ==
=== President ===
- Massimiliano Romeo

=== Deputy Vice-President ===
- Paolo Tosato

=== Vice-Presidents ===
- Antonella Faggi
- Enrico Montani
- Maria Saponara

=== Secretary ===
- Stefano Candiani

=== Treasurer ===
- Stefano Borghesi

=== Members ===
- Valeria Alessandrini (from 18 March 2020)
- Paolo Arrigoni
- Luigi Augussori
- Alberto Bagnai
- Giorgio Maria Bergesio
- Giulia Bongiorno
- Stefano Borghesi
- Lucia Borgonzoni
- Simone Bossi
- Umberto Bossi
- Luca Briziarelli
- Francesco Bruzzone
- Roberto Calderoli
- Maurizio Campari
- Stefano Candiani
- Massimo Candura
- Maria Cristina Cantù
- Marzia Casolati
- Gian Marco Centinaio
- Stefano Corti (from 31 July 2019)
- William De Vecchis
- Carlo Doria (from 5 October 2020)
- Roberta Ferrero
- Sonia Fregolent
- Umberto Fusco
- Ugo Grassi (from 12 December 2019)
- Tony Iwobi
- Stefano Lucidi (from 12 December 2019)
- Michelina Lunesu (from 19 June 2019)
- Raffaella Fiormaria Marin
- Roberto Marti
- Francesco Mollame (from 14 April 2021)
- Tiziana Nisini
- Andrea Ostellari
- Giuliano Pazzaglini
- Emanuele Pellegrini
- Pasquale Pepe
- Simona Pergreffi
- Cesare Pianasso
- Simone Pillon
- Daisy Pirovano
- Pietro Pisani
- Mario Pittoni
- Nadia Pizzol
- Stefania Pucciarelli
- Alessandra Riccardi (from 23 June 2020)
- Paolo Ripamonti
- Erica Rivolta
- Gianfranco Rufa
- Matteo Salvini (from 31 July 2019)
- Paolo Saviane
- Rosellina Sbrana
- Armando Siri
- Christian Solinas
- Erika Stefani
- Elena Testor (from 3 June 2020)
- Francesco Urraro (from 12 December 2019)
- Gianpaolo Vallardi
- Manuel Vescovi
- Cristiano Zuliani

== Five Star Movement ==
=== President ===
- Ettore Licheri

=== Deputy Vice-President ===
- Andrea Cioffi

=== Vice-Presidents ===
- Maria Domenica Castellone
- Gianluca Ferrara
- Arnaldo Lomuti
- Agostino Santillo

=== Secretaries ===
- Gabriele Lanzi
- Emma Pavanelli
- Vincenzo Santangelo

=== Treasurer ===
- Elisa Pirro

=== Members ===
- Rossella Accoto
- Donatella Agostinelli
- Alberto Airola
- Cristiano Anastasi
- Giuseppe Auddino
- Laura Bottici
- Elena Botto
- Antonella Campagna
- Gianluca Castaldi (from 3 July 2018)
- Francesco Castiello
- Nunzia Catalfo
- Mauro Coltorti
- Gian Marco Corbetta
- Vito Claudio Crimi
- Marco Croatti
- Grazia D'Angelo
- Danila De Lucia
- Gianmauro Dell'Olio
- Gabriella Di Girolamo
- Primo Di Nicola
- Stanislao Di Piazza
- Daniela Donno
- Giovanni Endrizzi
- Elvira Lucia Evangelista
- Giorgio Fede
- Emiliano Fede
- Barbara Floridia
- Agnese Gallicchio
- Vincenzo Garruti
- Felicia Gaudiano
- Gianni Pietro Girotto
- Barbara Guidolin
- Patty L'Abbate
- Cinzia Leone
- Pietro Lorefice
- Giulia Lupo
- Alessandra Maiorino
- Maria Laura Mantovani
- Gaspare Antonio Marinello
- Susy Matrisciano
- Raffaele Mautone
- Michela Montevecchi
- Gisella Naturale
- Simona Nunzia Nocerino
- Stefano Patuanelli
- Marco Pellegrini
- Gianluca Perilli
- Daniele Pesco
- Vito Rosario Petrocelli
- Angela Anna Bruna Piarulli
- Giuseppe Pisani
- Vincenzo Presutto
- Sergio Puglia
- Ruggiero Quarto
- Sabrina Ricciardi
- Sergio Romagnoli
- Iunio Valerio Romano
- Loredana Russo
- Pierpaolo Sileri
- Paola Taverna
- Danilo Toninelli
- Fabrizio Trentacoste
- Mario Turco
- Sergio Vaccaro
- Orietta Vanin

== Democratic Party ==
=== President ===
- Simona Flavia Malpezzi

=== Deputy Vice-President ===
- Alan Ferrari

=== Vice-Presidents ===
- Caterina Biti
- Franco Mirabelli

=== Secretaries ===
- Monica Cirinnà
- Vincenzo D'Arienzo

=== Treasurer ===
- Stefano Collina

=== Members ===
- Alessandro Alfieri
- Bruno Astorre
- Caterina Bini
- Paola Boldrini
- Tommaso Cerno
- Eugenio Comincini (from 22 March 2021)
- Luciano D'Alfonso
- Valeria Fedeli
- Andrea Ferrazzi
- Francesco Giacobbe
- Vanna Iori
- Mauro Laus
- Daniele Manca
- Andrea Marcucci
- Salvatore Margiotta
- Gianni Marilotti (from 15 April 2021)
- Assuntela Messina
- Antonio Misiani
- Tommaso Nannicini
- Dario Parrini
- Roberta Pinotti
- Gianni Pittella
- Roberto Rampi
- Tatjana Rojc (from 30 March 2021)
- Anna Rossomando
- Dario Stefano
- Mino Taricco
- Valeria Valente
- Vito Vattuone
- Francesco Verducci
- Luigi Zanda

== For the Autonomies (SVP–PATT, UV) ==
=== President ===
- Julia Unterberger

=== Deputy Vice-President ===
- Dieter Steger

=== Vice-President ===
- Albert Lanièce

=== Secretary ===
- Albert Lanièce

=== Treasurer ===
- Meinhard Durnwalder

=== Members ===
- Gianclaudio Bressa
- Pier Ferdinando Casini
- Elena Cattaneo (senator for life)
- Giorgio Napolitano (senator for life)

== Mixed ==
=== President ===
- Loredana De Petris (LeU-Eco)

=== Treasurer ===
- Emma Bonino (+Eu–Az)

=== Members ===
- Rosa Silvana Abate (from 19 February 2021)
- Luisa Angrisani (from 19 February 2021)
- Massimo Vittorio Berutti (IeC) (from 22 July 2020)
- Maurizio Buccarella (LeU-Eco) (from 30 March 2021)
- Adriano Cairo (MAIE) (from 30 March 2021)
- Andrea Causin (from 30 March 2021)
- Lello Ciampolillo (from 5 February 2020)
- Margherita Corrado (from 19 February 2020)
- Mattia Crucioli (from 19 February 2020)
- Saverio De Bonis (from 30 March 2021)
- Gregorio de Falco (from 30 March 2021)
- Emanuele Dessì (from 25 February 2021)
- Luigi Di Marzio (from 16 January 2020)
- Fabio Di Micco (from 19 February 2021)
- Vasco Errani (LeU-Eco)
- Raffaele Fantetti (IeC) (from 30 March 2021)
- Elena Fattori (from 6 November 2019)
- Silvana Giannuzzi (from 19 February 2021)
- Mario Michele Giarrusso (from 24 April 2020)
- Bianca Laura Granato (from 19 February 2021)
- Pietro Grasso (LeU-Eco)
- Virginia La Mura (from 19 February 2021)
- Francesco Laforgia (LeU-Eco)
- Elio Lannutti (from 19 February 2021)
- Barbara Lezzi (from 19 February 2021)
- Alessandrina Lonardo (from 29 July 2020)
- Matteo Mantero (from 19 February 2021)
- Carlo Martelli
- Ricardo Antonio Merlo (MAIE) (from 29 March 2021)
- Cataldo Mininno (from 19 February 2021)
- Mario Monti (senator for life)
- Vilma Moronese (from 19 February 2021)
- Nicola Morra (from 19 February 2021)
- Paola Nugnes (from 29 June 2019)
- Fabrizio Ortis (from 19 February 2021)
- Marinella Pacifico (IeC) (from 21 October 2020)
- Gianluigi Paragone (from 21 October 2020)
- Gaetano Quagliariello (IeC) (from 22 July 2020)
- Matteo Richetti (+Eu–Az) (from 11 September 2019)
- Paolo Romani (IeC) (from 22 July 2020)
- Mariarosaria Rossi (IeC) (from 30 March 2021)
- Sandro Ruotolo (LeU-Eco) (from 5 March 2020)
- Liliana Segre (senator for life)

== Non-affiliated senators for life ==
- Renzo Piano
- Carlo Rubbia
