= Apulia (Chamber of Deputies constituency) =

- Chamber of Deputies; Electoral constituency
- Region: Apulia
- Electorate: 3,217,704 (2022); 3,268,164 (2018)
- Major settlements: Bari, Brindisi, Foggia, Lecce, Taranto

Current constituency
- Created: 1993
- Seats: 27
- Members: M5S (5); FI (6); PD (3); Lega (3); FdI (7); NM (2); AVS (1)

Apulia is one of the 29 constituencies (Italian: circoscrizioni) represented in the Chamber of Deputies, the lower house of the Italian parliament. The constituency currently elects 27 deputies, being the second largest after Emilia-Romagna. Its boundaries correspond to those of the Italian region of Apulia. The electoral system uses a parallel voting system, which act as a mixed system, with 3/8 of seats allocated using a first-past-the-post electoral system and 5/8 using a proportional method, with one round of voting.

The constituency was first established by the Mattarella law on 4 August 1993 and later confirmed by the Calderoli law on 21 December 2005 and by the Rosato law on 3 November 2017. The constituency was then updated during the Italian 2022 Election in accordance with the 2020 Italian Constitutional Referendum.

== Members of the Parliament ==
=== Legislature XIX (2022–Present) ===
Single-member districts
| District | | | Deputy | Party | |
| N. | Name | Map | Deputy | Party | |
|---|---|---|---|---|---|
| 01 | Foggia | | Pellegrini Marco | | Five Star Movement |
| 02 | Cerignol | | Giandiego Gatta | | Forza Italia |
| 03 | Andria | | Mariangela Matera | | Brothers of Italy |
| 04 | Molfetta | | Rita dalla Chiesa | | Forza Italia |
| 05 | Bari | | Davide Bellomo | | League *on election* |
| 06 | Altamura | | Rossano Sasso | | League |
| 07 | Brindisi | | Mauro D'Attis | | Forza Italia |
| 08 | Taranto | | Dario Iaia | | Brothers of Italy |
| 09 | Lecce | | Saverio Congedo | | Brothers of Italy |
| 10 | Galatina | | Alessandro Colucci | | Us Moderates |

Multi-member districts
| District | | | Party | Deputy | Parliamentary group | | Ref. |
| N. | Name | Map | Party | Deputy | At election | Current | Ref. |
|---|---|---|---|---|---|---|---|
| 01 | Apulia | | Five Star Movement | Carla Giuliano | Five Star Movement | | |
| 01 | Apulia | | Forza Italia | Giorgio Lovecchio | Five Star Movement | Forza Italia | |
| 01 | Apulia | | Brothers of Italy | Giandonato La Salandra | Brothers of Italy | | |
| 02 | Apulia | | Five Star Movement | Gianmauro Dell'Olio | Five Star Movement | | |
| 02 | Apulia | | Brothers of Italy | Marcello Gemmato | Brothers of Italy | | |
| 02 | Apulia | | Democratic Party | Marco Lacarra | Democratic Party | | |
| 03 | Apulia | | Five Star Movement | Patty L'Abbate | Five Star Movement | | |
| 03 | Apulia | | Brothers of Italy | Giovanni Maiorano | Brothers of Italy | | |
| 03 | Apulia | | Democratic Party | Ubaldo Pagano | Democratic Party | | |
| 03 | Apulia | | Forza Italia | Vito de Palma | Forza Italia | | |
| 04 | Apulia | | Us Moderates | Maria Rosaria | Us Moderates | | |
| 04 | Apulia | | Forza Italia | Caroppo Andrea | Forza Italia | | |
| 04 | Apulia | | League | Di Mattina | League | | |
| 04 | Apulia | | Five Star Movement | Leonardo Donno | Five Star Movement | | |
| 04 | Apulia | | | Fitto Reffelele | Removed | | |
| 04 | Apulia | | Brothers of Italy | Gabellone Antonia | Brothers of Italy | | |
| 04 | Apulia | | Greens and Left Alliance | Piccolotti Elisabetha | Greens and Left Alliance | | |
| 04 | Apulia | | Democratic Party | Stefanazzi Claudio | Democratic Party | | |

=== 2018–2022 ===
Single-member districts
| District | | | Deputy | Party |
| N. | Name | Map | Deputy | Party |
|---|---|---|---|---|
| 01 | Bari–Libertà–Marconi–San Girolamo–Fresca | | Paolo Lattanzio | Five Star Movement |
| 02 | Bari–Bitonto | | Francesca Anna Ruggiero | Five Star Movement |
| 03 | Molfetta | | Francesca Galizia | Five Star Movement |
| 04 | Andria | | Giuseppe D'Ambrosio | Five Star Movement |
| 05 | Altamura | | Nunzio Angiola | Five Star Movement |
| 06 | Monopoli | | Emanuele Scagliusi | Five Star Movement |
| 07 | Lecce | | Michele Nitti | Five Star Movement |
| 08 | Nardò | | Maria Soave Alemanno | Five Star Movement |
| 09 | Casarano | | Nadia Aprile | Five Star Movement |
| 10 | Taranto | | Rosalba De Giorgi | Five Star Movement |
| 11 | Martina Franca | | Gianpaolo Cassese | Five Star Movement |
| 12 | Francavilla Fontana | | Giovanni Luca Aresta | Five Star Movement |
| 13 | Brindisi | | Anna Macina | Five Star Movement |
| 14 | San Severo | | Carla Giuliano | Five Star Movement |
| 15 | Cerignola | | Antonio Tasso | Five Star Movement |
| 16 | Foggia | | Rosa Menga | Five Star Movement |

Multi-member districts
| District | | | Party | Deputy |
| N. | Name | Map | Party | Deputy |
|---|---|---|---|---|
| 01 | Apulia – 01 | | Five Star Movement | Giuseppe Brescia |
| 01 | Apulia – 01 | | Five Star Movement | Angela Masi |
| 01 | Apulia – 01 | | Five Star Movement | Davide Galantino |
| 01 | Apulia – 01 | | Forza Italia | Francesco Paolo Sisto |
| 01 | Apulia – 01 | | Democratic Party | Marco Lacarra |
| 02 | Apulia – 02 | | Five Star Movement | Diego De Lorenzis |
| 02 | Apulia – 02 | | Five Star Movement | Veronica Giannone |
| 02 | Apulia – 02 | | Five Star Movement | Leonardo Donno |
| 02 | Apulia – 02 | | Forza Italia | Elvira Savino |
| 02 | Apulia – 02 | | Forza Italia | Elio Vito |
| 02 | Apulia – 02 | | Democratic Party | Francesco Boccia |
| 02 | Apulia – 02 | | League | Rossano Sasso |
| 02 | Apulia – 02 | | Brothers of Italy | Marcello Gemmato |
| 02 | Apulia – 02 | | Free and Equal | Rossella Muroni |
| 03 | Apulia – 03 | | Five Star Movement | Giuseppe L'Abbate |
| 03 | Apulia – 03 | | Five Star Movement | Filippo Giuseppe Perconti |
| 03 | Apulia – 03 | | Five Star Movement | Alessandra Ermellino |
| 03 | Apulia – 03 | | Five Star Movement | Giovanni Vianello |
| 03 | Apulia – 03 | | Five Star Movement | Valentina Palmisano |
| 03 | Apulia – 03 | | Forza Italia | Mauro D'Attis |
| 03 | Apulia – 03 | | Forza Italia | Vincenza Labriola |
| 03 | Apulia – 03 | | Democratic Party | Ubaldo Pagano |
| 03 | Apulia – 03 | | League | Anna Rita Tateo |
| 04 | Apulia – 04 | | Five Star Movement | Marialuisa Faro |
| 04 | Apulia – 04 | | Five Star Movement | Giorgio Lovecchio |
| 04 | Apulia – 04 | | Five Star Movement | Francesca Troiano |
| 04 | Apulia – 04 | | Forza Italia | Annaelsa Tartaglione |
| 04 | Apulia – 04 | | Democratic Party | Michele Bordo |
