= List of members of the Senate of Italy, 2013–2018 =

This is a list of the 320 members of the 17th legislature of the Italian Senate, they were elected in the 2013 general election and assumed office on 15 March 2013.

Senators for life are marked with a "(L)"

== The Government ==
=== Partito Democratico ===
- Donatella Albano
- Silvana Amati
- Ignazio Angioni
- Bruno Astorre
- Maria Teresa Bertuzzi
- Amedeo Bianco
- Daniele Gaetano Borioli
- Claudio Broglia
- Filippo Bubbico
- Massimo Caleo
- Laura Cantini
- Rosaria Capacchione
- Valeria Cardinali
- Felice Casson
- Vannino Chiti
- Monica Cirinnà
- Roberto Cociancich
- Stefano Collina
- Paolo Corsini
- Giuseppe Luigi Salvatore Cucca
- Vincenzo Cuomo
- Erica D'adda
- Emilia Grazia De Biasi
- Mauro Del Barba
- Isabella De Monte
- Rosa Maria Di Giorgi
- Nerina Dirindin
- Stefano Esposito
- Camilla Fabbri
- Emma Fattorini
- Nicoletta Favero
- Valeria Fedeli
- Elena Ferrara
- Marco Filippi
- Rosanna Filippin
- Anna Finocchiaro
- Elena Fissore
- Federico Fornaro
- Maria Grazia Gatti
- Rita Ghedini
- Francesco Giacobbe
- Nadia Ginetti
- Miguel Gotor
- Manuela Granaiola
- Pietro Grasso
- Maria Cecilia Guerra
- Paolo Guerrieri Paleotti
- Josefa Idem
- Bachisio Silvio Lai
- Nicola Latorre
- Stefano Lepri
- Sergio Lo Iudice
- Doris Lo Moro
- Carlo Lucherini
- Giuseppe Lumia
- Patrizia Manassero
- Luigi Manconi
- Andrea Marcucci
- Salvatore Margiotta
- Ignazio Marino
- Mauro Maria Marino
- Claudio Martini
- Donella Mattesini
- Giuseppina Maturani
- Claudio Micheloni
- Maurizio Migliavacca
- Corradino Mineo
- Marco Minniti
- Franco Mirabelli
- Mario Morgoni
- Claudio Moscardelli
- Massimo Mucchetti
- Pamela Giacoma Orra
- Venera Padua
- Giorgio Pagliari
- Annamaria Parente
- Carlo Pegorer
- Stefania Pezzopane
- Leana Pignedoli
- Roberta Pinotti
- Luciano Pizzetti
- Francesca Puglisi
- Laura Puppato
- Raffaele Ranucci
- Lucrezia Ricchiuti
- Gianluca Rossi
- Francesco Russo
- Roberto Ruta
- Angelica Saggese
- Gian Carlo Sangalli
- Giorgio Santini
- Francesco Scalia
- Annalisa Silvestro
- Pasquale Sollo
- Lodovico Sonego
- Maria Spilabotte
- Ugo Sposetti
- Walter Tocci
- Salvatore Tomaselli
- Giorgio Tonini
- Mario Tronti
- Renato Guerino Turano
- Stefano Vaccari
- Daniele Valentini
- Vito Vattuone
- Francesco Verducci
- Luigi Zanda
- Magda Angela Zanoni
- Sergio Zavoli

=== New Centre-right ===
- Piero Aiello
- Gabriele Albertini
- Andrea Augello
- Antonio Azzollini
- Laura Biancomi
- Giovanni Bilardi
- Paolo Bonaiuti
- Antonio Stefano Caridi
- Massimo Cassano
- Federica Chiavaroli
- Francesco Colucci
- Luigi Compagna
- Franco Conte
- Antonio D'Ali
- Mario Dalla Tor
- Vincenzo D'Ascola
- Ulisse Di Giacomo
- Giuseppe Esposito
- Roberto Formigoni
- Antonio Gentile
- Carlo Giovanardi
- Marcello Gualdani
- Bruno Mancuso
- Giuseppe Francesco Maria Marinello
- Paolo Naccarato
- Pippo Pagano
- Gaetano Quagliariello
- Luciano Rossi
- Maurizio Sacconi
- Renato Schifani
- Salvatore Torrisi
- Simona Vicari
- Guide Viceconti

=== For Italy ===
- Pier Ferdinando Casini
- Antonio De Poli
- Aldo Di Biagio
- Salvatore Tito Di Maggio
- Angela D'Onghia
- Luigi Marino
- Mario Mauro
- Maria Paola Merloni
- Andrea Olivero
- Lucio Romano

=== Civic Choice ===
- Gianpiero Dalla Zuanna
- Benedetto Della Vedova
- Stefania Giannini
- Pietro Ichino
- Linda Lanzillotta
- Alessandro Maran
- Mario Monti (L)
- Gianluca Susta

=== Group Per le Autonomie ===
- Giulio Andreotti (L)
- Hans Berger
- Enrico Buemi
- Elena Cattaneo (L)
- Emilio Colombo (L)
- Mario Ferrara
- Vittorio Fravezzi
- Albert Laniece
- Fausto Guilherme Longo
- Riccardo Nencini
- Francesco Palermo
- Franco Panizza
- Carlo Rubbia (L)
- Karl Zeller
- Claudio Zin

== The Opposition ==
=== Forza Italia ===
- Maria Elisabetta Alberti
- Bruno Alicata
- Francesco Maria Amoruso
- Francesco Aracri
- Silvio Berlusconi
- Anna Maria Bernini
- Bernabo Bocca
- Sandro Bondi
- Anna Cinzia Bonfrisco
- Francesco Bruni
- Donato Bruno
- Giacomo Caliendo
- Franco Cardiello
- Franco Carraro
- Remigio Ceroni
- Riccardo Conti
- Luigi D'Ambrosio Lettieri
- Domenico De Siano
- Ciro Falanga
- Enzo Fasano
- Claudio Fazzone
- Emilio Floris
- Paolo Galimberti
- Maurizio Gasparri
- Niccolo Ghedini
- Vincenzo Gibiino
- Francesco Maria Giro
- Pietro Iurlaro
- Pietro Liuzzi
- Eva Longo
- Lucio Malan
- Andrea Mandelli
- Mario Mantovani
- Marco Marin
- Altero Matteoli
- Riccardo Mazzoni
- Alfredo Messina
- Augusto Minzolini
- Vilma Moronese
- Nicola Morra
- Alessandra Mussolini
- Lionello Marco Pagnoncelli
- Nitto Francesco Palma
- Paolo Pelino
- Luigi Perrone
- Enrico Piccinelli
- Giovanni Piccoli
- Antonio Razzi
- Manuela Repetti
- Maria Rizzotti
- Paolo Romani
- Mariarosaria Rossi
- Salvatore Sciascia
- Domenico Scilipoti
- Francesco Scoma
- Giancarlo Serafini
- Lucio Rosario Tarquinio
- Denis Verdini
- Antonio Giuseppe Maria Verro
- Riccardo Villari
- Pierantonio Zanettin
- Vittorio Zizza
- Sante Zuffada

=== Five Star Movement ===
- Alberto Airola
- Ornella Bertorotta
- Laura Bignami
- Rosetta Enza Blundo
- Laura Bottici
- Maurizio Buccarella
- Elisa Bulgarelli
- Enrico Cappelletti
- Gianluca Castaldi
- Nunzia Catalfo
- Lello Ciampolillo
- Andrea Cioffi
- Roberto Cotti
- Vito Claudio Crimi
- Cristina De Pietro
- Daniela Donno
- Giovanni Endrizzi
- Elena Fattori
- Serenella Fucksia
- Luigi Gaetti
- Mario Michele Giarrusso
- Gianni Pietro Girotto
- Barbara Lezzi
- Stefano Lucidi
- Giovanna Mangili
- Carlo Martelli
- Bruno Marton
- Francesco Molinari
- Michela Montevecchi
- Paolo Nugnes
- Sara Plagini
- Vito Rosario Petrocelli
- Sergio Puglia
- Vincenzo Santagelo
- Marco Scibona
- Manuela Serra
- Ivana Simeone
- Paola Taverna
- Giuseppe Vacciano

=== Lega Nord ===
- Paolo Arrigoni
- Patrizia Bisinella
- Massimo Bitonci
- Roberto Calderoli
- Stefano Candiani
- Gian Marco Cientinaio
- Silvana Andreina Comaroli
- Nunziante Consiglio
- Jonny Crosio
- Sergio Divina
- Massimo Garavaglia
- Emanuela Munerato
- Erika Stefani
- Giacomo Stucchi
- Raffaele Volpi

=== Grandi Autonomie e Libertà ===
- Lucio Barani
- Giuseppe Compagnone
- Vincenzo D'Anna
- Michelino Davico
- Pietro Langella
- Giovanni Mauro
- Antonio Milo
- Giuseppe Ruvolo
- Antonio Fabio Scavone
- Giulio Tremonti

=== Left Ecology Freedom ===
- Giovanni Barozzino
- Massimo Cervellini
- Peppe De Cristofaro
- Loredana De Petris
- Alessia Petraglia
- Dario Stefano
- Luciano Uras

=== Independents ===
- Claudio Abbado (L)
- Fabiola Anitori
- Alessandra Bencini
- Fabrizio Bocchino
- Francesco Campanella
- Monica Casaletto
- Carlo Azeglio Ciampi (L)
- Paola De Pin
- Adele Gambaro
- Marino Germano Mastrangeli
- Maria Mussini
- Luis Alberto Orellana
- Bartolomeo Pepe
- Renzo Piano (L)
- Maurizio Romani
- Maurizio Rossi
