= 2018 Italian Senate election in Lombardy =

- March 4, 2018

All 49 Lombard seats to the Italian Senate
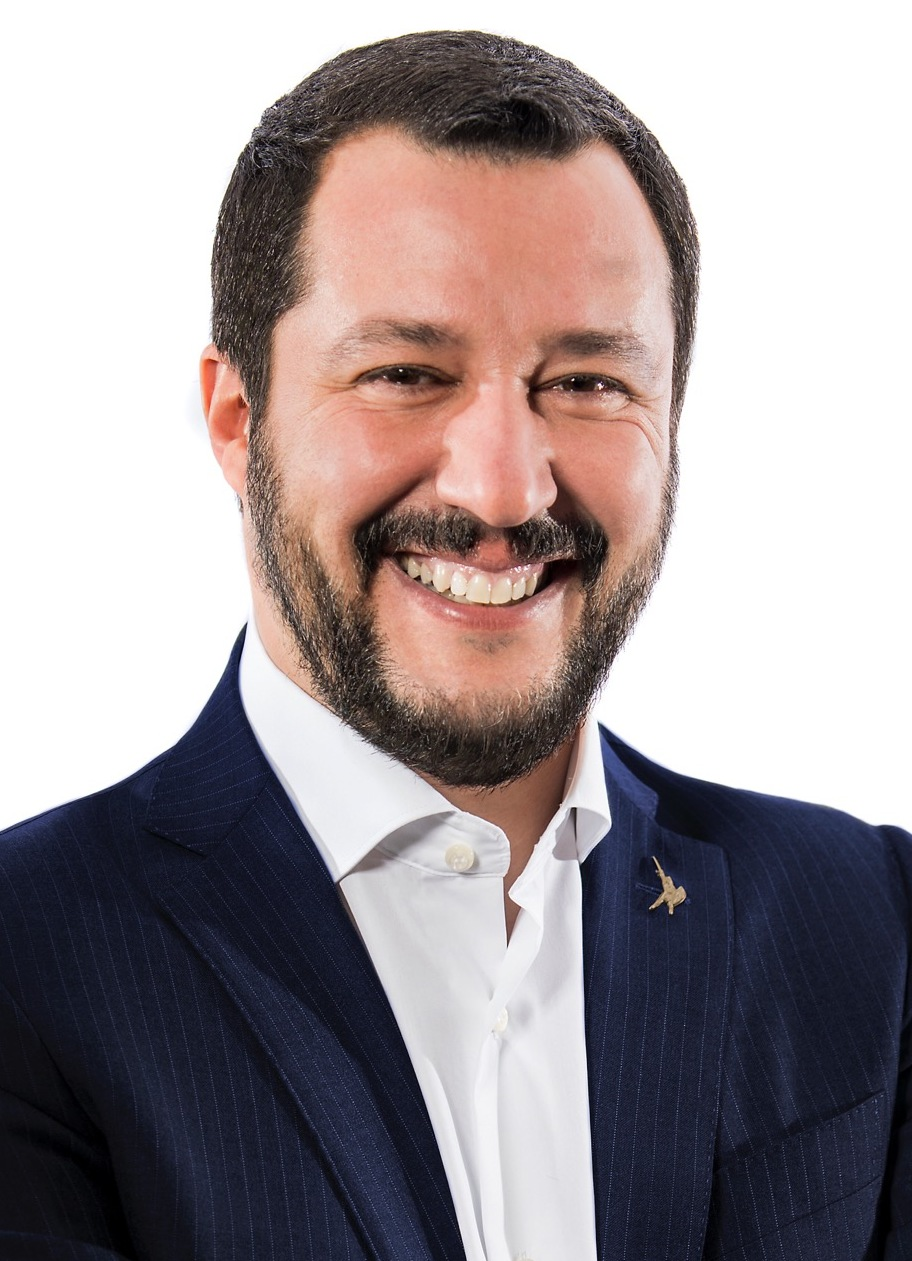

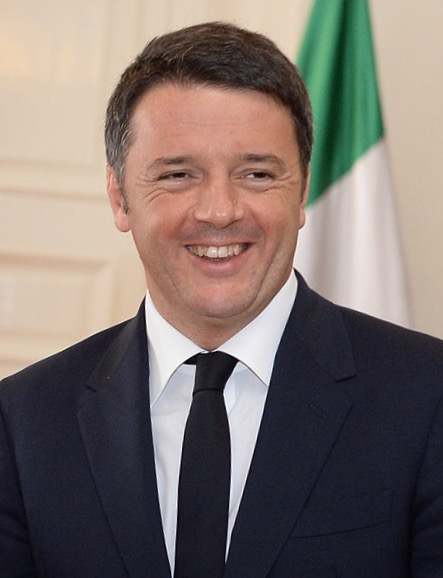
	First party	Second party
Leader	Matteo Salvini	Matteo Renzi
Party	Lega	Democratic Party
Alliance	Centre-right	Centre-left
Last election	27 seats, 37.6%	11 seats, 29.7%
Seats won	32	9
Seat change	▲5	▼2
Popular vote	2,450,406	1,310,715
Percentage	47.2%	25.3%
Swing	▲9.6%	▼4.4%
Local majority before election
Centre-right coalition
New local majority
Centre-right coalition

Lombardy renewed its delegation to the Italian Senate on March 4, 2018. This election was a part of national Italian general election of 2018 even if, according to the Italian Constitution, every senatorial challenge in each Region is a single and independent race.

This senatorial election was paired with the 2018 Lombard regional election.

The election was won by the centre-right coalition between The People of Freedom. The centre-left arrived near the Five Star Movement of comedian Beppe Grillo. All the twelve provinces gave a plurality to the centre-right coalition.

== Electoral law ==
The new electoral law for the Senate established in 2017 by the Rosatellum Law was a form of mixed single vote. A party presents its own closed lists and it can join other parties in alliances. Two thirds of the seats are divided between coalitions, and subsequently to party lists, using the largest remainder method with a Hare quota. The party votes are then automatically transferred to the coalition leaders running in the first-past-the-post.

== Results ==
- League 9+8=17 (▲6)
- Forza Italia 5+6=11 (▼1)
- Brothers of Italy 1+3=4 (spin-off)
- Democratic Party 8+1=9 (▼2)
- Five Star Movement 7 (=)
- Free and equals 1 (▲1)
- others (▼4)

=== Constituencies ===
N°	Constituency	Winner	Alliance	Party	Votes %
1	Milan Central	Tommaso Cerno	Centre-left	Democratic Party	41.3%
2	Milan Rogoredo	Maria Cristina Cantù	Centre-right	League	38.4%
3	Milan Legnano	Salvatore Sciascia	Centre-right	Forza Italia	41.9%
4	Rozzano	Ignazio La Russa	Centre-right	Brothers of Italy	44.5%
5	Cologno Monzese	Emanuele Pellegrini	Centre-right	League	41.2%
6	Monza	Stefania Craxi	Centre-right	Forza Italia	46.8%
7	Sesto San Giovanni	Paolo Romani	Centre-right	Forza Italia	41.1%
8	Lecco	Antonella Faggi	Centre-right	League	51.0%
9	Cantù	Lucia Ronzulli	Centre-right	Forza Italia	56.8%
10	Como	Erica Rivolta	Centre-right	League	48.5%
11	Varese	Stefano Candiani	Centre-right	League	49.3%
12	Bergamo	Maria Gallone	Centre-right	Forza Italia	52.4%
13	Treviglio	Simona Pergreffi	Centre-right	League	55.9%
14	Brescia	Adriano Paroli	Centre-right	Forza Italia	47.9%
15	Lumezzane	Stefano Borghesi	Centre-right	League	56.2%
16	Pavia	Gian Marco Centinaio	Centre-right	League	49.6%
17	Cremona	Daniela Santanchè	Centre-right	Brothers of Italy	48.1%
18	Mantua	Isabella Rauti	Centre-right	Brothers of Italy	44.4%

=== Proportional representation ===
League	M5S	Democratic Party	Forza Italia	Brothers of Italy	Free and Equal
Simone Bossi; Luigi Augussori; Roberto Calderoli; Daisy Pirovano; Toni Iwobi; Umberto Bossi; Paolo Arrigoni; Massimiliano Romeo; Simone Pillon	Danilo Toninelli; Vito Crimi; Gianluigi Paragone; Simona Nocerino; Daniele Pesco; Alessandra Riccardi; Gianmarco Corbetta	Alan Ferrari; Simona Malpezzi; Antonio Misiani; Alessandro Alfieri; Tommaso Nannicini; Eugenio Comincini; Franco Mirabelli; Roberto Rampi	Giancarlo Serafini; Alberto Barachini; Adriano Galliani; Giacomo Caliendo; Alfredo Messina	Lara Magoni	Francesco Laforgia
