= De Lucia =

De Lucia or de Lucía is a surname. Notable people with the surname include:

- Alfonso De Lucia (born 1983), Italian footballer and coach
- Danila De Lucia (born 1961), Italian politician and journalist
- Fernando De Lucia (c. 1860 – 1925), Italian opera singer
- Francesco De Lucia (1934–2022), Italian politician
- Gabriella De Lucia (born 1976), Italian astrophysicist
- Paco de Lucía (1947–2014), Spanish flamenco guitarist, brother of Pepe
- Pepe de Lucía (born 1945), Spanish flamenco singer, brother of Paco
- Victor De Lucia (born 1996), Italian footballer
