= Minervini =

Minervini is an Italian surname from Cosenza and central Apulia, derived from the Latin cognomen Minervinus or from the town of Minervino Murge, Apulia. Notable people with the surname include:

- Angela Minervini, 1960s Italian film actress
- Craig Minervini, American sports broadcaster
- Gianni Minervini (producer) (1928–2020), Italian actor and television and film producer
- Gianni Minervini (swimmer) (born 1966), Italian Olympic swimmer
- Girolamo Minervini (1919–1980), Italian magistrate
- Guglielmo Minervini (1961–2016), Italian politician
- Roberto Minervini (born 1970), Italian film director, screenwriter, photographer and music producer

== See also ==
- Minervin
- Minervina
- Minervino (disambiguation)
