= Salso Lake =

Lake in Manfredonia, Apulia, Italy

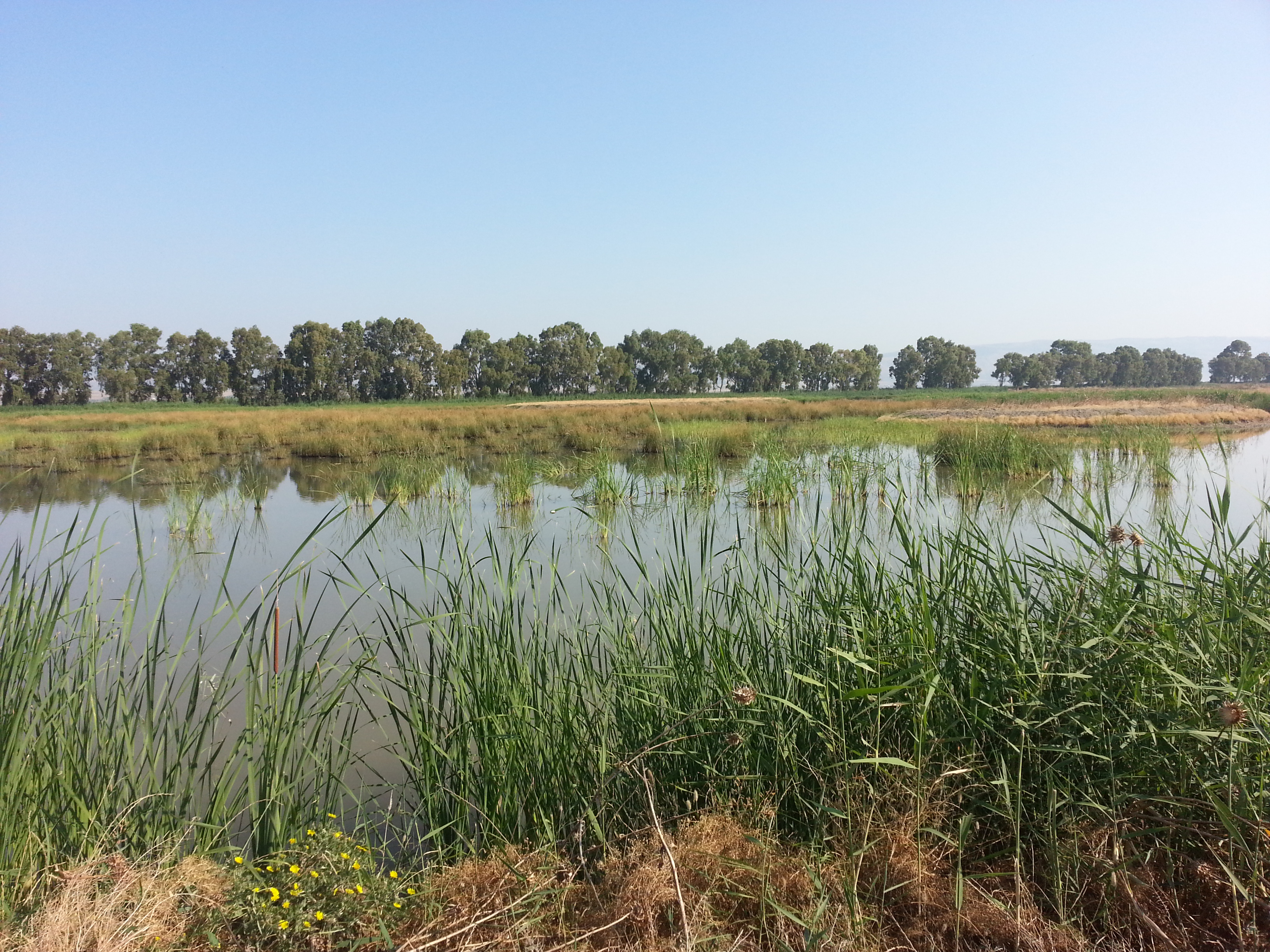
- Salso lake

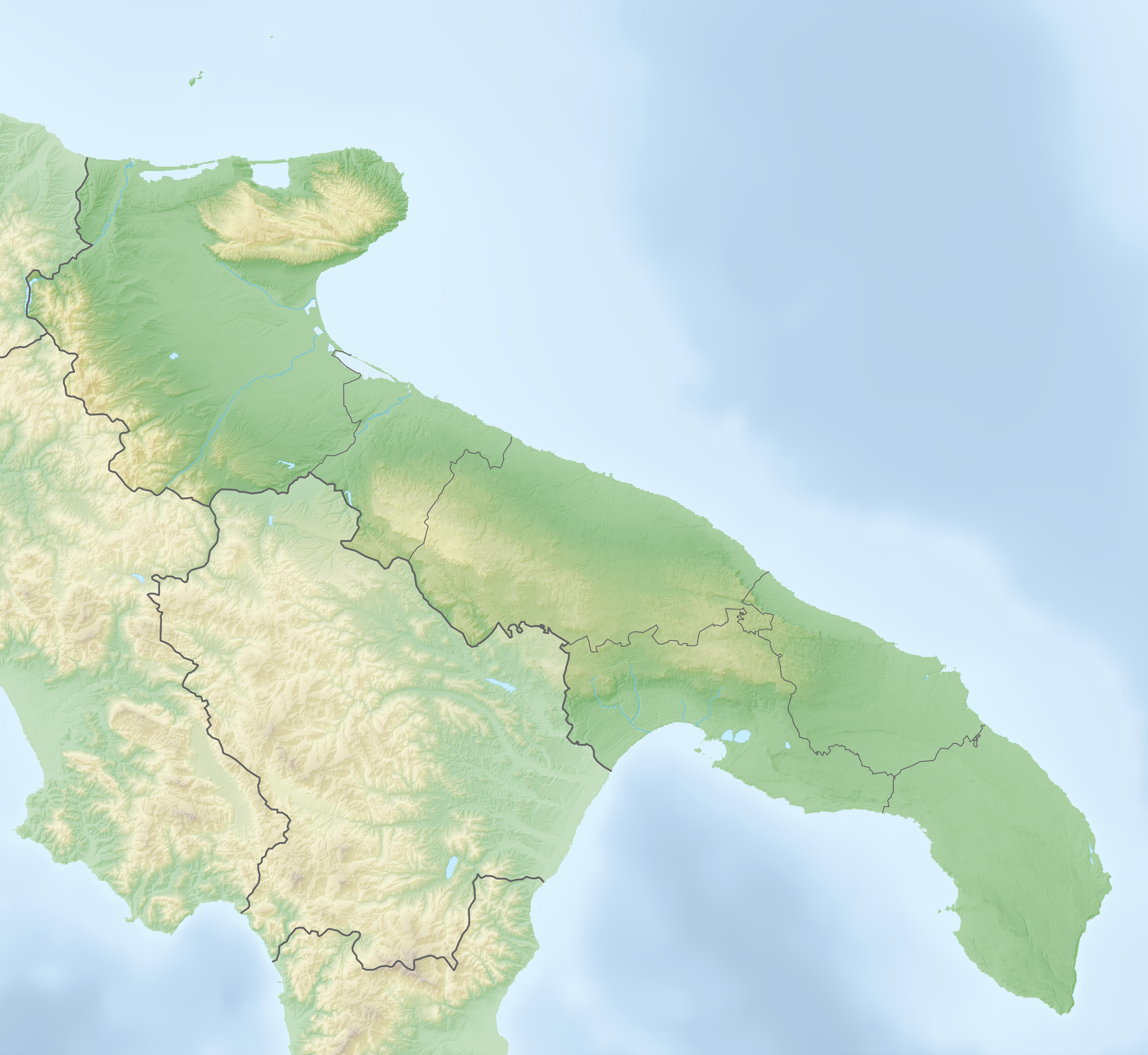
- Location within Apulia
- Location: Province of Foggia, Apulia
- Coordinates: 41.559142°N 15.872841°E
- Basin countries: Italy

Salso Lake is a lake in the Province of Foggia, Apulia, Italy. In is located within Gargano National Park.
