= Salandra (surname) =

Salandra is a surname. Notable people with the surname include:

- Aldo Salandra (born 1958), Salvadoran sprinter
- Antonio Salandra (1853–1931), Italian politician, journalist, and writer
- Giandonato La Salandra (born 1978), Italian politician
- Sal Salandra (born 1946), American artist
