= Minervino =

Minervino may refer to:

== Places ==
- Minervino di Lecce, Apulia, Italy
- Minervino Murge, Apulia, Italy
  - Roman Catholic Diocese of Minervino Murge

== People ==
- Amilton Minervino da Silva (born 1989), known mononymously, Brazilian soccer player
- Guerino Minervino Neto (born 1950), known as Neto Guerino, Brazilian soccer player
- Minervino González Melero (1913–?), Spanish Olympic sports shooter
- Minervino José Lopes Pietra (1954–2024), Portuguese soccer player

== See also ==
- Minervina
- Minervini
- Minervin
