= Rossomando =

Rossomando is a surname. Notable people with the surname include:

- Anna Rossomando (born 1963), Italian politician
- Anthony Rossomando (born 1976), American writer-producer, composer, and guitarist
- Peter Rossomando (born 1972), American football player and coach
