= Italexit (political party) =

Political party in Italy

Italexit for Italy Italexit per l'Italia
- Secretary: Vacant
- Spokesperson: Antonino Iracà; Andrea Perillo; Roberto Robilotta
- Founder: Gianluigi Paragone
- Founded: 23 July 2020
- Split from: Five Star Movement
- Headquarters: Via dei Grimani 4, Milan
- Newspaper: Il Paragone (Note: The name of Italexit's paper is a pun between the surname of its founder (Gianluigi Paragone) and the Italian word paragone means "comparison" in English.)
- Ideology: Hard Euroscepticism; Populism; Sovereigntism
- Political position: Big tent or far-right
- National affiliation: Human Value Party (2020–2021); CasaPound (2022); Italian Animalist Party (2024)
- Colours: Blue
- Chamber of Deputies: 0 / 400
- Senate of the Republic: 0 / 200
- European Parliament: 0 / 76
- Regional Councils: 0 / 896

Website
- italexit.it

Italexit for Italy (Italian: Italexit per l'Italia), usually referred to simply as Italexit, is a populist, sovereignist, and hard Eurosceptic political party in Italy, which advocates the country's exit from the eurozone and the European Union. Its founder is Gianluigi Paragone, a former member of the Senate of the Republic and TV journalist. Paragone and Italexit oppose Italy's membership in NATO. Although the party rejects a classification on the political spectrum and includes some left-wing positions, it is considered right-wing due to Paragone's profile. Italexit was founded in 2020 after Paragone was expelled from the Five Star Movement (M5S). Between 2020 and 2022, Italexit was joined by several members of the Italian Parliament, mainly from the M5S and the League (Lega). Paragone had been a supporter of the M5S–Lega government, which was known as the Government of Change, and opposed the M5S government with the Democratic Party (PD).

Italexit was one of the leading parliamentary parties critical of the management of the COVID-19 pandemic in Italy, particularly of the Green Pass. In the 2021 and 2022 local elections, Paragone and Italexit were unsuccessful in becoming mayor of Milan and electing councillors, respectively. For the 2022 Italian general election, Italexit formed a joint list with Alternativa, which represented left-leaning members of the M5S that exited the party after it joined the national unity government of Mario Draghi. Their alliance soon ended after Italexit had included far-right and neo-fascist candidates from CasaPound. During this period, the Italian press reported that CasaPound had successfully gained control of Italexit. In December 2023, Paragone left Italexit. In March 2024, some former Italexit members founded the Movement for Italexit, which was not supported by Paragone.

== History ==
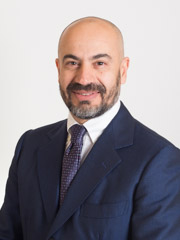
Gianluigi Paragone (pictured in 2018) was the party's founder and leader until 2023.

In January 2020, M5S senator and former journalist Gianluigi Paragone, (Note: Paragone was editor of the Northern League's newspaper La Padania, deputy editor of the Libero newspaper, and host of several talk shows on Rai 2 and La7.) who was close to the Northern League (LN) during his journalistic career and was known for his Eurosceptic stance, was expelled from the party after he abstained in the vote of confidence for the second Conte government, which was supported by M5S and the PD; he had also voted against the 2022 budget. In the following months, Paragone was speaking about a new party, talking about the "need for courage ... and money". In July 2020, a few weeks after meeting with Nigel Farage, a key figure of the Brexit movement, Paragone launched Italexit with the stated goal of taking Italy out of the European Union. Two M5S senators (Carlo Martelli and Mario Giarrusso) defected to Italexit in 2021, while Lega senator William De Vecchis and deputy Jessica Costanzo, who had been already expelled from the M5S, also joined in 2022.

Between 2021 and 2022, Italexit was critical towards the policies of the Draghi government, which was established as a national unity government, (Note: See Roberts, Hannah (12 February 2021). "Mario Draghi forms Italian government". Politico.) in particular those applied to contain the COVID-19 pandemic. The party strongly opposed the EU Digital COVID Certificate, also known as the Green Pass, (Note: See Giuffrida, Angela (22 July 2021). "Italy imposes 'green pass' restrictions on unvaccinated people". The Guardian.) which became mandatory to work and traveled in the country from October 2021 onwards. Paragone labelled the vaccination certificate an "obligation of infamy", stated that he was not vaccinated, and described his opposition to mandatory vaccination as a "religious war". In the 2021 Milan municipal election, Paragone obtained 2.99% of the vote and came in third behind incumbent mayor Giuseppe Sala of the centre-left coalition and Luca Bernardo of the centre-right coalition. As he did not surpass the 3% electoral thresold, Paragone did not get elected to the municipal council. Elsewhere in the 2021 Italian local elections, Italexit's candidates scored from a low of 0.8% of the vote in Turin, to a high of 2.0% in Bologna.

Italexit took part to the 2022 Italian local elections. The party scored a low of 0.9% of the vote in Como, to a high of 2.6% in Alessandria. In June 2022, Italexit held in Rome its first party congress. On 26 June 2022, its organizational chart and political platform were approved, and Paragone was unanimously elected party secretary. In July 2022, Paragone announced the formation of a joint list of candidates for the 2022 Italian general election with Alternativa, a party supportive of dirigisme and economic interventionism, established in November 2021 by former Five Star Movement members. On 5 August 2022, Alternativa announced the dissolution of the electoral alliance with Italexit, on the grounds that neo-fascists were ostensibly present within Italexit's lists of candidates. Paragone responded by accusing Alternativa of attempting to "use [Italexit] as a taxi to the Parliament". On 25 September 2022, the party achieved about 1.9 of the vote and did not elect any deputy or senator.

In a letter published on the party website in December 2023, (Note: See Cagnoni, Paolo (29 December 2023). "Italexit per l'Italia: Gianluigi Paragone si è dimesso dalla carica di segretario nazionale del partito" [Italexit for Italy: Gianluigi Paragone has resigned from the position of national secretary of the party]. Italexit per l'Italia (in Italian).) Paragone resigned as secretary, returning to work as a journalist, and he also prevented the party from using his name. In February 2024, the party's national board appointed a provisional leadership composed of three spokerspersons: Antonino Iracà, Andrea Perillo, and Roberto Robilotta. (Note: See Cagnoni, Paolo (6 March 2024). "Antonio Iracà: 'Italexit c'è e va avanti, con i valori e gli ideali che abbiamo sempre difeso. Contro la Ue e per il bene dell'Italia'. Il messaggio dei nuovi coordinatori. 'Ecco cosa faremo adesso'. (video)" [Antonio Iracà: "Italexit exists and is moving forward, with the values and ideals that we have always defended. Against the EU and for the good of Italy". The message from the new coordinators. "Here's what we're going to do now." (video)]. Italexit per l'Italia (in Italian). Cagnoni, Paolo (14 February 2024). "Italexit c'è! Il partito ha scelto il suo percorso dopo le dimissioni del segretario. Alla guida un consiglio di reggenza, si riparte dai territori". Italexit per l'Italia (in Italian).) In March 2024, Andrea Anderson, Giampaolo Bocci, and Carlo Carassai, all of whom were members of Paragone's Italexit, founded the Movement for Italexit and joined the Freedom list of Cateno De Luca for the 2024 European Parliament election. Paragone made clear that this was not the Italexit he had founded and issued a cease-and-desist warning.

== Ideology ==
Ideologically, Italexit is considered to be populist, sovereignist, and Eurosceptic, and it is grouped with several other minor anti-establishment parties in Italy. In its party programme for 2022 Italian general election, Italexit proposed a return of Italian sovereignty (especially fiscal and monetary) in contrast to the influence of European Union, with the orientation being strongly Eurosceptic and critical of part of the same Italian political and bureaucratic establishment. In this sense, it suggested policies such as the nationalization of the Bank of Italy and other strategic assets (energy, roads, communications, and water) and a social public expenditure. In the words of Alexander Damiano Ricci, "[a]lthough Paragone's credentials are more comparable to a right-wing profile, Italexit's manifesto contains all the typical elements of a left-wing program." In 2022, the party presented itself to the right of the centre-right coalition. On the left–right political spectrum, which the party rejected since its founding claiming to be unclassifiable and apartitico, Italexit is categorized as right-wing; this is also owed to Paragone, who defined himself as a conservative and presented Italexit as a conservative party.

As evidenced by its name, the party's stated main aim at its founding was Italy's withdrawal from the European Union and the eurozone. Regarding COVID-19, Italexit expressed its opposition to social limitations and EU Digital COVID Certificate, and proposed public compensations for victims of adverse effects of COVID-19 vaccines and a public inquiry about the Italian management of the COVID-19 pandemic. Italexit welcomed some dissidents from the neo-fascist social movement CasaPound in 2022, leading several members to resign amid accusations that the party had fallen to the far-right of the political spectrum. The party reportedly fell further under the control of far-right militants, and was used by CasaPound in an attempt to enter the Italian Parliament. When he was party leader, Paragone stated that he wanted Italy to exit from NATO, as well as to cease the international sanctions during the Russo-Ukrainian War against Russia, which he declared "are causing damage to [the country's] economy".

== Election results ==
=== Italian Parliament ===
Election	Leader	Chamber of Deputies				Senate of the Republic			
Election	Leader	Votes	%	Seats	+/–	Votes	%	Seats	+/–
2022	Gianluigi Paragone	534,579	1.90	0 / 400	New	515,294	1.87	0 / 200	New

=== European Parliament ===
Election	Leader	Votes	%	Seats	+/–	EP Group
2024 (Note: Run in a joint list with PAI.)	Vacant	29,552 (14th)	0.13	0 / 76	New	–

== See also ==
- European debt crisis
- List of political parties in Italy
- Radical right (Europe)
- Right-wing populism
- Withdrawal from the European Union
- Withdrawal from the eurozone
- Withdrawal from NATO
