= Lonardo =

Lonardo is a surname. Notable people with the surname include:

- Alessandrina Lonardo (born 1953), Italian politician
- Angelo Lonardo (1911−2006), American mobster
- Joseph Lonardo (1884–1927), American mobster
- Roberto Lonardo, Uruguayan footballer

== See also ==
- Lonardi, surname
