= Francesco De Lucia =

Italian lawyer and politician (1934–2022)

Mayor of Bari
- In office 28 September 1981 – 21 March 1990
- Preceded by: Luigi Farace
- Succeeded by: Enrico Dalfino

Vice-President of Apulia
- In office 3 September 1993 – 23 April 1995
- Preceded by: Vito Angiuli
- Succeeded by: Raffaele Fitto

Personal details
- Born: 21 February 1934 Triggiano, Italy
- Died: 15 July 2022 (aged 88) Bari, Italy
- Party: PSI
- Education: University of Bari
- Occupation: Lawyer

Francesco De Lucia (21 February 1934 – 15 July 2022) was an Italian politician. A member of the Italian Socialist Party, he was mayor of Bari from 1981 to 1990.

De Lucia died in Bari on 15 July 2022 at the age of 88.
