= Rolando Nannicini =

Italian politician (1946–2026)

Member of the Chamber of Deputies of Italy for Tuscany
- In office 22 May 2001 – 14 March 2013

Personal details
- Born: 27 July 1946 Montevarchi, Italy
- Died: 13 January 2026 (aged 79)
- Party: DS (1998–2007); PD (2007–2026)
- Children: Tommaso Nannicini
- Education: University of Florence
- Occupation: Mathematician

Rolando Nannicini (27 July 1946 – 13 January 2026) was an Italian politician. A member of the Democrats of the Left and the Democratic Party, he served in the Chamber of Deputies from 2001 to 2013.

Nannicini died on 13 January 2026, at the age of 79.
