= Gargano National Park =

National park in Foggia, Italy

Coordinates: 41°48′22″N 15°55′30″E

Parco Nazionale del Gargano
- IUCN category II (national park)
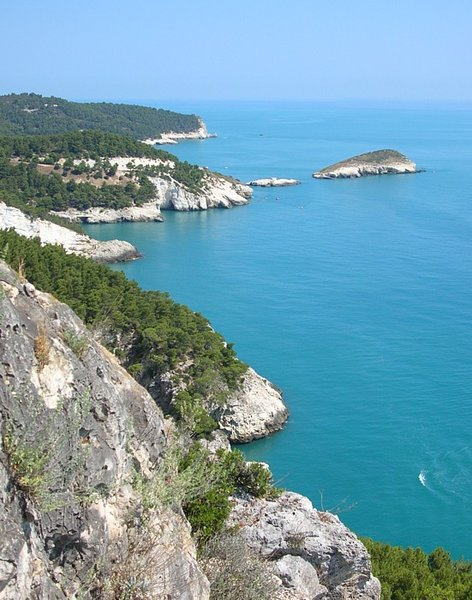
- Gargano coast near Vieste.

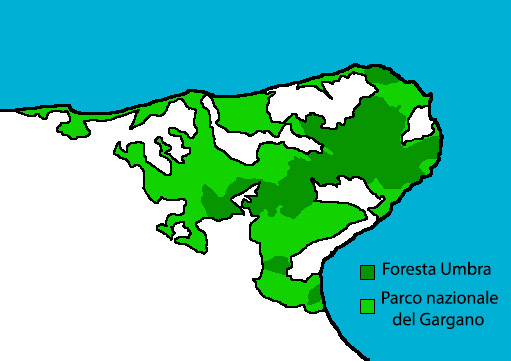
- Nearest city: Foggia
- Area: 118,144 ha (291,940 acres)
- Established: 1991
- Governing body: Ministero dell'Ambiente
- Website: www.parcogargano.it/web/gargano/guida

The Gargano National Park (Italian: Parco nazionale del Gargano) is a national park in the province of Foggia in southern Italy. Aside from the Gargano promontory (encompassing the ancient woodlands of the Foresta Umbra) from which it takes its name, it includes also the Tremiti Islands archipelago and the wetlands Lago Salso. It is the largest park in Apulia.

The National Park of Gargano (UNESCO site) is one of the few national protected areas efficiently contributing to the "un Bosco per Kyoto" project, which in 2007 has involved several schools in the realization of projects for a social and responsible tourism. It is one of the most appreciated areas, unique for the decrease of fires and for the politics of environmental awareness.

In the park many species of wild orchids grow, including several of Ophrys, bee orchids. It is one of the most biodiverse spots in Western Europe, and has 350-year-old beech trees.

== See also ==
- Daunia
- Tavoliere delle Puglie
- Apulia
- Garganica, the local breed of goat
- Trabucco a giant fishing machine belonging to Gargano tradition
- 1627 Gargano earthquake

== Presidents ==
- Giandiego Gatta (2004-2010)
- Stefano Pecorella (2012-2017)
- Pasquale Pazienza (2019-)
