= Maria Soave Alemanno =

Italian politician (born 1972)

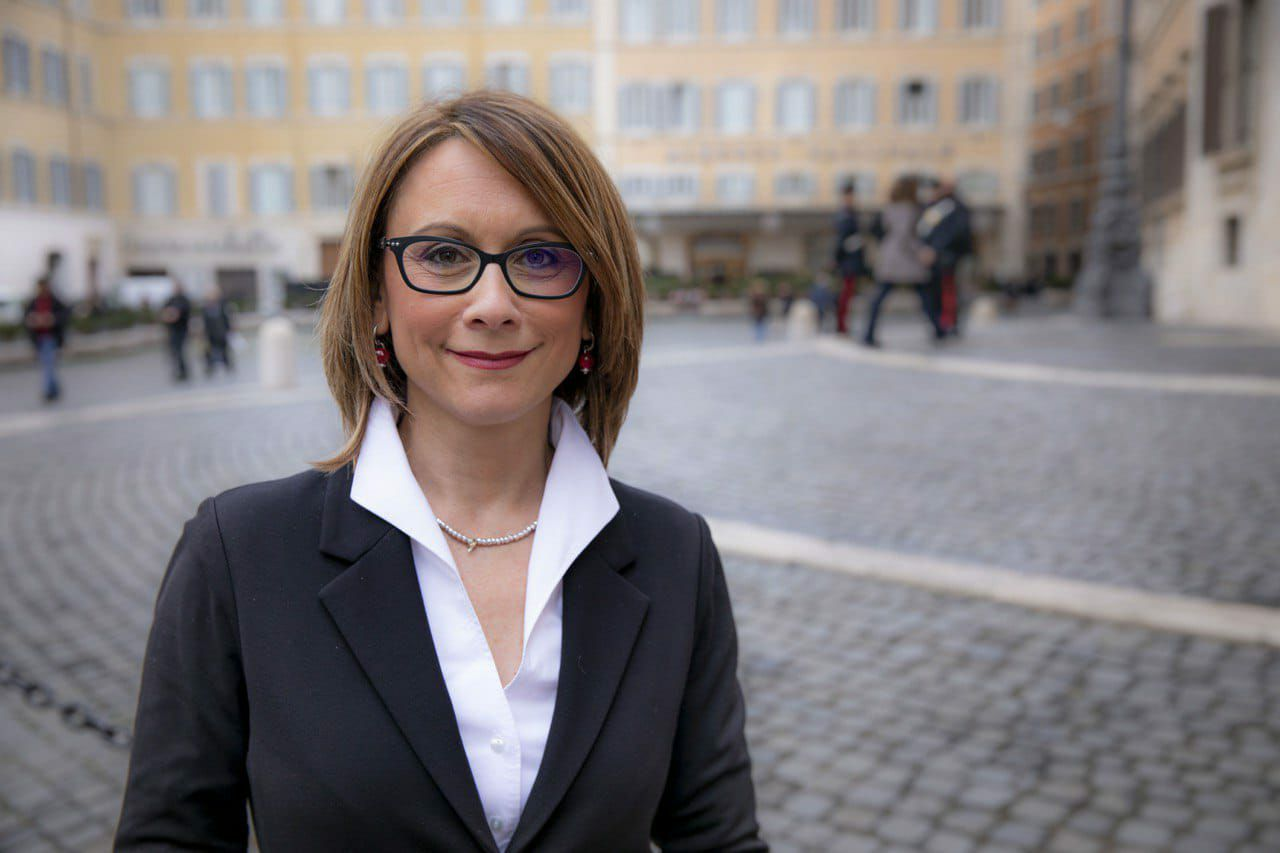

Member of the Chamber of Deputies
- In office 27 March 2018 – 12 October 2022
- Constituency: Apulia 8

Personal details
- Born: 15 April 1972 (age 53) Nardò, Italy
- Party: Five Star Movement; Italia Viva
- Children: 1

Maria Soave Alemanno (born 15 April 1972) is an Italian politician who served in the Chamber of Deputies from 2018 to 2022, as a member of the Five Star Movement and Italia Viva. Elected to the Chamber of Deputies in 2018, she left the Five Star Movement due to its actions during the 2022 Italian government crisis and lost reelection in 2022.

== Early life ==
Maria Soave Alemanno was born in Nardò, Italy, on 15 April 1972. She is an insurance agent and graduated from the Vanoni Nardò Commercial Technical Institute in 1991. She worked at the Unipolsai General Insurance Agency from 1997 to 2018.

== Career ==
In the 2018 general election Alemanno was elected to the Chamber of Deputies from the 8th Apulia district as a member of the Five Star Movement. On 21 July 2022, she left the Five Star Movement and joined Italia Viva in response to the 2022 Italian government crisis and the Five Star Movement refusing to vote in a motion of no confidence called by the Senate of the Republic. She stated that if a motion of no confidence was brought up that she would vote in favour of confidence in Mario Draghi. She, with the support of Italia Viva and Action, ran for reelection in the 9th Apulia district, but lost to Brothers of Italy nominee Saverio Congedo in the 2022 general election

During Alemanno's tenure in the Chamber of Deputies she was a member of the Finance commission and the vice president of the Parliamentary Commission of Inquiry on Consumer and User Protection.

== Personal life ==
Alemanno is married and is the mother of one child.

== Works cited ==
=== News ===
- "Ecco chi sono i parlamentari eletti in Puglia". DIRE. 22 March 2018. Archived from the original on 20 June 2025.
- "Elezioni 2022, ecco gli eletti in Puglia e Basilicata Clicca sulla mappa". La Gazzetta del Mezzogiorno. 26 September 2022. Archived from the original on 20 June 2025.
- "The deputy Alemanno leaves the 5-star Movement and enters Italy alive". Agenzia Nova. 21 July 2022. Archived from the original on 20 June 2025.
- Napolitano, Pasquale (20 July 2022). "Quei 30 grillini pronti a staccarsi. "Ci affidiamo al miracolo di Berlusconi"". Il Giornale. Archived from the original on 20 June 2025.

=== Web ===
- "ALEMANNO Maria Soave - IV-IC'E'". Chamber of Deputies. Archived from the original on 20 June 2025.
- "Curriculum Vitae" (PDF). Dipartimento per gli affari europei. Archived (PDF) from the original on 20 June 2025.
