= Guglielmo Minervini =

Italian politician (1961–2016)

Mayor of Molfetta
- In office 12 June 1994 – 13 May 2001

Personal details
- Born: 22 May 1961 Molfetta, Italy
- Died: 2 August 2016 (aged 55) Bari, Italy
- Cause of death: Cancer
- Party: Dem (1998-2002); DL (2002-2007); PD (2007-2015)
- Education: University of Bari
- Occupation: Teacher, politician

Guglielmo Minervini (22 May 1961 – 2 August 2016) was an Italian politician, who served as the mayor of Molfetta from 1994 until 2001. From 2005 to 2016, he was a member of the Regional Assembly of Apulia, serving as a regional minister under the Nichi Vendola presidency.

== Biography ==
Minervini has been a close collaborator of bishop Antonio Bello and in 1985 he founded the "House of Peace", a point of reference for the fight against crime for many young people in the city.

A progressive catholic, in 1994 Minervini was elected mayor of Molfetta as an independent supported by the Alliance of Progressives, becoming the first mayor elected directly by the people of Molfetta. He was re-elected in 1998 with the support of The Olive Tree coalition, and in that year he joined Romano Prodi's The Democrats, that later converged into Francesco Rutelli's The Daisy. During his administrative term, he laid down the conditions for the development of the industrial area of Molfetta.

After the 2005 Apulian regional elections, Minervini supported the centre-left candidate Nichi Vendola and was elected regional councilor, becoming the most voted candidate in the province of Bari. Vendola appointed him Councilor for transparency and active citizenship, with delegations to sport and youth policies. Minervini was re-confirmed as regional councilor after the 2010 regional elections and this time was appointed Councilor for mobility and transports.

In his ten years as councilor he was remembered for the call for the social reuse of assets confiscated from the Mafia, the reorganization of regional offices and, above all, the Bollenti spiriti program that promoted training and the start of work for thousands of young Apulians.

On 31 January 2013, Minervini revealed that during the previous year he found out that he had cancer. Despite his health problems, he did not lessen his political commitment, turning his attention especially to the fight against illegal hiring. In 2014, Minervini was a candidate for the centre-left primaries to choose Vendola's successor as gubernatorial candidate, together with the former mayor of Bari Michele Emiliano and senator Dario Stefano: Minervini reached third place, behind the winner Emiliano, who was later elected governor, and Stefano.

Despite his critical attitude towards Emiliano, Minervini supported him during the 2015 regional elections and was re-elected at the regional assembly as the leader of the movement Us on the Left for Apulia, becoming the group leader in the assembly.

Minervini lost his battle against cancer and died on 2 August 2016, at the age of 55.
