= Urania Papatheu =

Italian politician

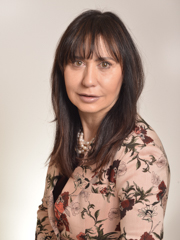
Senator Urania Papatheu in 2018.

Urania Giulia Rosina Papatheu (born 25 July 1965) is an Italian politician from Forza Italia. She represented Sicily in the Senate of Italy from 2018 to 2022.

== See also ==
- List of members of the Senate of Italy, 2018–2022
