= Laura Bottici =

Italian politician

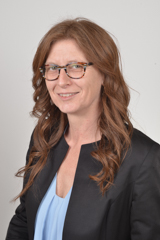
- Laura Bottici 2018

Member of the Italian Senate
- In office 15 March 2013 – 12 October 2022
- Constituency: Tuscany

Personal details
- Born: 3 July 1971 (age 55) Carrara, Italy
- Party: Five Star Movement

Laura Bottici (born 3 July 1971) is an Italian politician from the Five Star Movement who served as a Senator from 2013 to 2022.

== See also ==
- List of members of the Senate of Italy, 2013–2018
- List of members of the Senate of Italy, 2018–2022
