= Nadia Aprile =

Italian politician (born 1962)

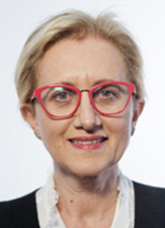
- Nadia Aprile in 2018

Member of the Chamber of Deputies
- In office 23 March 2018 – 13 October 2022
- Constituency: 9 (Casarano)

Personal details
- Born: 17 November 1962 (age 63) Turin, Italy
- Party: Independent (since 2020)
- Other political affiliations: Five Star Movement (until 2020)

Nadia Aprile (born 17 November 1962) is an Italian politician. She was a member of the Chamber of Deputies of the Italian Parliament from 2018 to 2022.

== Biography ==
Born in Turin to parents from Salento, she graduated in economics and commerce and works as an accountant. She lives in Taviano, in the province of Lecce.

=== Political career ===
In the 2018 Italian general election, she was elected as a member of the Chamber of Deputies for the Five Star Movement in the Apulia constituency. She was appointed as a member of the Sixth Finance Commission in 2018.

On 21 January 2020, under disciplinary proceedings for unpaid reimbursements, she left the Five Star Movement (but was still expelled from the party ten days later), and moved to the Mixed Group. She left parliament at the 2022 Italian general election.

== See also ==
- List of members of the Chamber of Deputies of Italy, 2018–2022
