= Luigi Farace =

Italian politician and businessman (1934–2018)

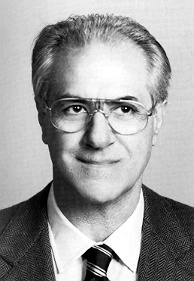
- Farace in 1990

Member of the Chamber of Deputies
- In office 2 July 1987 – 14 April 1994

Mayor of Bari
- In office 28 July 1978 – 27 September 1981
- Preceded by: Nicola Lamaddalena
- Succeeded by: Francesco De Lucia

Personal details
- Born: 14 October 1934; Bari, Italy
- Died: 30 November 2018 (aged 84); Bari, Italy
- Political party: Christian Democracy (DC)

Luigi Farace (14 October 1934 – 30 November 2018) was an Italian politician, businessman, and a member the Christian Democrats of Italy. He served as the Mayor of Bari from 1978 until 1981. He was then elected to Chamber of Deputies for two terms during the X and XI legislatures from 1987 to 1994.

Farace died in Bari on 30 November 2018 at the age of 84.
