= Daniela Donno =

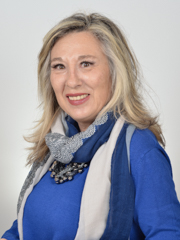
- Daniela Donnoin 2018

Member of the Italian Senate
- In office 15 March 2013 – 12 October 2022
- Constituency: Apulia

Personal details
- Born: 11 January 1960 (age 66) Lecce, Italy
- Party: Independent (since 2022)
- Other political affiliations: Together for the Future (2022); Five Star Movement (2009-2022)

Daniela Donno (born 11 January 1960) is an Italian politician. She was elected to the Senate of the Italian Parliament in the 2013 and 2018 for the Five Star Movement.

== Biography ==
After obtaining her high school diploma in 1978, Donno attended training courses as a computer operator, accounting operator, stenotypist, and secretary. She worked as an employee in various sectors.

== Political career ==
Donno entered political activism in 2007 by participating in meetings of the civic group "MeetUP - Salentini Uniti con Beppe Grillo " in Lecce, becoming a member the following year.

In the 2012 municipal elections in Lecce she was a candidate for the position of "Consigliere comunale" for the Five Star Movement, but she was not elected.

=== Election to the Senate ===
In the 2013 Italian general election she was elected as Senator of the XVII Legislature of the Italian Republic in the Apulia constituency for the Five Star Movement.

From 15 May 2013 to 19 April 2016, Donno was a member of the Standing Committee on European Union Policies. She later served as Vice-President of the Special Commission for the Protection and Promotion of Human Rights and as a member of the Standing Committee on Agriculture and Agri-food Production.

In the 2018 Italian general election Donno was re-nominated for the Senate of the Republic for the M5S and was re-elected as a senator elected in the proportional quota.

On 22 June 2022, she left the Five Star Movement and joined Together for the Future, a group born from a split led by Minister Luigi Di Maio.

== See also ==
- Legislature XVII of Italy
- List of members of the Senate of Italy, 2013–2018
- Legislature XVIII of Italy
- List of members of the Senate of Italy, 2018–2022
