= Ettore Antonio Licheri =

Italian politician

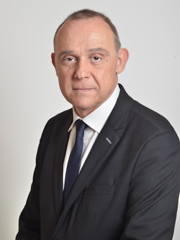

Senator of the Italian Republic
- Incumbent
- Assumed office 23 March 2018
- Constituency: Sardinia (2018-2022); Tuscany (2022-)

Vice-president of the 3rd Commission for Foreign policy and defense of the Senate
- Incumbent
- Assumed office 10 November 2022

Parliamentary leader of Five Star Movement
- In office 2020–2021
- Preceded by: Gianluca Perilli
- Succeeded by: Maria Domenica Castellone

President of the Commission of Politics for European Union of the Senate of the Republic
- In office 21 June 2018 – 29 July 2020
- Preceded by: Vannino Chiti
- Succeeded by: Dario Stefano

Personal details
- Born: 11 October 1963 (age 62) Sassari, Sardinia, Italy
- Party: Five Star Movement
- Education: University of Sassari (Degree in Jurisprudence)
- Profession: Politician, lawyer

Ettore Antonio Licheri (pronounced [ˈɛttore liˈkeːri], born 11 October 1963) is an Italian politician and lawyer. He served as the Parliamentary leader of the Five Star Movement in the Italian Senate from 2020 to 2021.

== Biography ==
Born and raised in Sassari, Sardinia, he graduated in Jurisprudence in the University of Sassari and has dedicated a part of his professional activity to sports justice, being a member of FIGC and having important roles in the investigations for the scandals of Calciopoli (2006) and Calcioscommesse (2015).

== Political activity ==
In 2018, he entered politics as member of the Five Stars Movement and run for the general election for the Senate, eventually being elected.
In October 2020, he was elected as parliamentary leader of the Movement, taking the place of Gianluca Perilli. He kept this role until November 2021, when he was succeeded by Maria Domenica Castellone.
In the snap election of 2022, he was candidate again as list leader in the circumscriptions of Piedmont, Sardinia and Tuscany, resulting elected in the latter.
In the Legislature XIX, he is vice-president of the 3rd Commission for Foreign policy and defense, as well as being member of the board for Parliamentary Elections and Immunities and of the Special Commission for the examination of urgent acts presented by the Government, member of the Parliamentary Committee for accusation proceedings and of the Italian Delegation to the Parliamentary Assembly of the Council of Europe.

== See also ==
- List of current Italian senators
