= Sabrina Ricciardi =

Italian politician (born 1968)

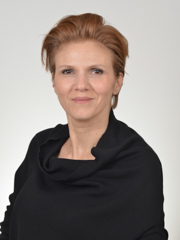
Sabrina Ricciardi in 2018.

Sabrina Ricciardi (born 21 November 1968) is an Italian politician for the Five Star Movement, who has been a member of the Senate of the Republic since the 2018 Italian general election.

== See also ==
- List of members of the Senate of Italy, 2018–2022
