= Ornella Bertorotta =

Italian politician

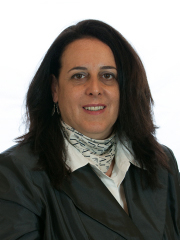

Member of the Senate of the Republic for Sicily
- In office 19 March 2013 – 22 March 2018

Personal details
- Born: Ornella Bertorotta; 25 August 1967 (age 59) Catania, Sicily, Italy
- Party: Five Star Movement

Ornella Bertorotta (born 25 August 1967) is an Italian politician for the Five Star Movement. She sat in the Italian Senate in the Legislature XVII of Italy after she was elected in the 2013 Italian general election.

== See also ==
- List of members of the Senate of Italy, 2013–2018
