= Lonardi =

Lonardi is a surname. Notable people with the surname include:

- Eduardo Lonardi (1896–1956), Argentine military leader who led the junta that overthrew Juan Perón
- Giovanni Lonardi (born 1996), Italian cyclist
- Massimo Lonardi (born 1953), Italian lutenist
- Stefano Lonardi (born 1968), Italian computer scientist and bioinformatician

== See also ==
- Lonardo, surname
