= Paola Taverna =

Italian politician (born 1969)

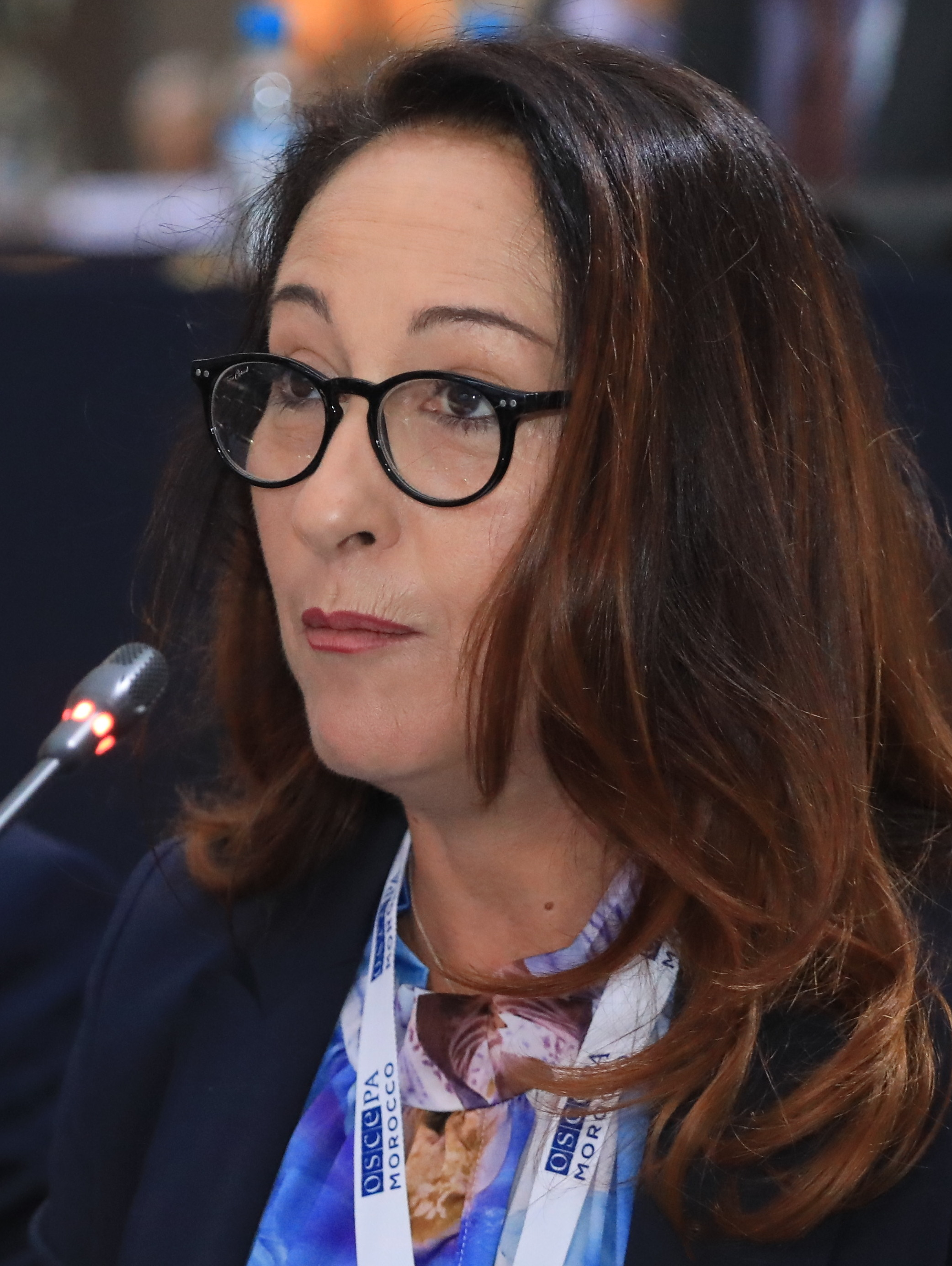

Member of the Senate of the Republic
- In office 19 March 2013 – 12 October 2022
- Constituency: Lazio 2

Vice-President of the Senate of the Republic
- In office 18 March 2018 – 12 October 2022

Personal details
- Born: 2 March 1969 (age 57) Rome, Italy

Paola Taverna (born 2 March 1969) is an Italian politician for the Five Star Movement, who has been a member of the Senate of the Republic since the 2013 Italian general election. In March 2018, she was elected vice-president of the Senate.

== Biography ==
Born in Rome, Taverna lives in the Torre Maura district.

== Political life ==
In the 2013 Italian general election, Taverna was elected to the Italian Senate on the Five Star Movement party-list in Lazio. Taverna was re-elected at the 2018 general election in the constituency of Rome—Tuscolano District.

On 28 March 2018, Taverna was elected by her fellow senators to be the vice president of the Senate of the Republic with 105 votes.

== Political positions ==
Paola Taverna during the session no. 327 of 2014 in the Senate falsely stated that the welfare state would have been created by Benito Mussolini during his dictatorship through measures such as the severance pay and accused Matteo Renzi of wanting to dismantle it with the reforms launched by the PD.

In February 2016, shortly before the municipal elections in Rome, she claimed the existence of an alleged plot, strangely hatched by the rival parties, to allow the victory of the candidate of the 5 Star Movement Virginia Raggi.

Taverna has been critical of compulsory vaccinations. She has also called for the minimum wage to be increased.

Order of precedence
Preceded by Ignazio La Russa as Second Vice President of the Senate	Order of precedence of Italy; Third Vice President of the Senate	Succeeded by Anna Rossomando as Fourth Vice President of the Senate
