= Tiziana Nisini =

Italian politician (born 1975)

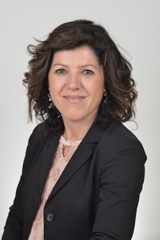
Tiziana Nisini in 2018.

Tiziana Nisini (born 18 October 1975) is an Italian politician from Lega Nord. She has been State Secretary at the Ministry of Labour and Social Policies since March 2021.

She was a Senator from 2018 to 2021.
