= Mariangela Matera =

Italian politician (born 1967)

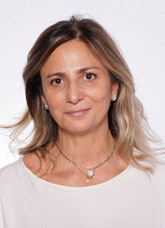
- Matera in 2022

Member of the Chamber of Deputies
- Incumbent
- Assumed office 13 October 2022
- Constituency: Apulia – U03

Personal details
- Born: 3 January 1967 (age 59)
- Party: Brothers of Italy

Mariangela Matera (born 3 January 1967) is an Italian politician serving as a member of the Chamber of Deputies since 2022. She previously worked as a chartered accountant.
