= Giorgio Lovecchio =

Italian politician (born 1978)

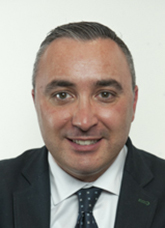
- Lovecchio in 2018

Member of the Chamber of Deputies
- Incumbent
- Assumed office 23 March 2018
- Constituency: Apulia – P04 (2018–2022); Apulia – P01 (2022–present)

Personal details
- Born: 5 March 1978 (age 48)
- Party: Forza Italia (since 2024)

Giorgio Lovecchio (born 5 March 1978) is an Italian politician serving as a member of the Chamber of Deputies since 2018. From 2022 to 2025, he served as deputy chairman of the finance committee.

== Biography ==
He began his political career by running twice in local elections as a candidate for city council on the Five Star Movement ticket. Specifically, in 2014, he ran in Foggia as part of the slate that Beppe Grillo had withdrawn his support from during the election campaign, receiving 89 votes. In 2017, however, he ran in the municipal elections in Castelluccio dei Sauri, in the province of Foggia.

A candidate in the 2018 general election for the Five Star Movement—having received 147 (online) votes in the so-called “parliamentary primaries”—he was elected to the Chamber of Deputies (Italy) in the Puglia - 04 multi-member district. From June 13 to June 21, 2018, he served on the Special Committee for the Examination of Government Acts, and as of that same day, he has been a member of the Fifth Committee (Budget, Treasury, and Planning).

In 2022, he ran for re-election in the general election and was re-elected as a member of the Chamber of Deputies. He served as vice chair of the Finance Committee.

In September 2024, he left the M5S because, in his view, it had shifted too far to the left, and joined Forza Italia (2013).
