= Giorgio Maria Bergesio =

Italian politician (born 1963)

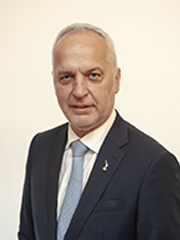
- Bergesio in 2022

Member of the Senate
- Incumbent
- Assumed office 23 March 2018
- Constituency: Piedmont – P02 (2018–2022); Piedmont – U05 (2022–present)

Personal details
- Born: 22 November 1963 (age 62)
- Party: Lega
- Children: Francesca Bergesio

Giorgio Maria Bergesio (born 22 November 1963) is an Italian politician serving as a member of the Senate since 2018. From 1995 to 2004, he served as mayor of Cervere. He is the father of Francesca Bergesio.
