= Jessica Costanzo =

Italian politician

Jessica Costanzo (born 19 January 1984) is an Italian politician.

== Political career ==
She was elected to the Chamber of Deputies in the 2018 general election. She was expelled from the party for voting against the Draghi government in 2021.
