= Dario Iaia =

Italian politician (born 1973)

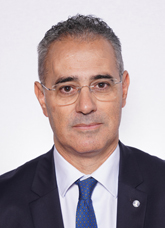
- Iaia in 2022

Member of the Chamber of Deputies
- Incumbent
- Assumed office 13 October 2022
- Constituency: Apulia – 08

Personal details
- Born: 20 November 1973 (age 52)
- Party: Brothers of Italy (since 2019)

Dario Iaia (born 20 November 1973) is an Italian politician serving as a member of the Chamber of Deputies since 2022. From 2012 to 2022, he served as mayor of Sava.
