= Annaelsa Tartaglione =

Italian politician (born 1989)

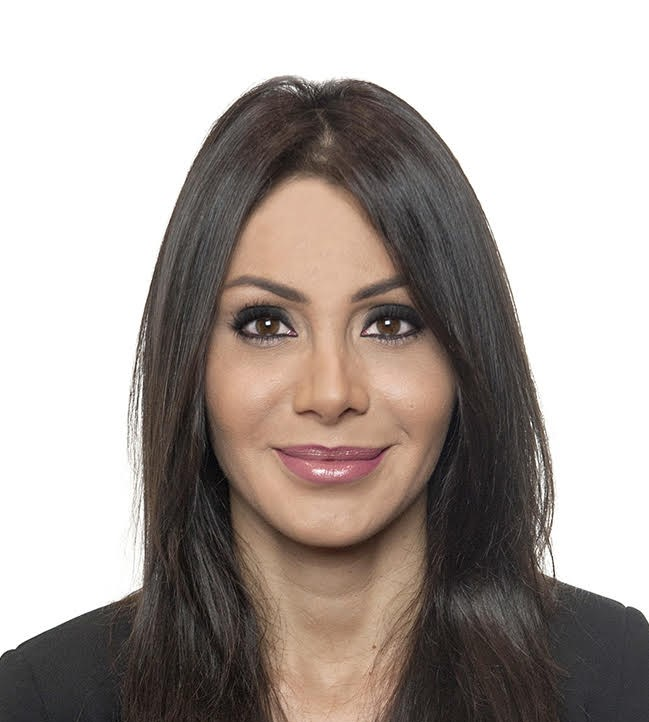
- Tartaglione in 2019

Member of the Chamber of Deputies
- In office 23 March 2018 – 12 October 2022
- Constituency: Apulia – P04

Personal details
- Born: 27 May 1989 (age 37)
- Party: Forza Italia (since 2013)

Annaelsa Tartaglione (born 27 May 1989) is an Italian politician. From 2018 to 2022, she was a member of the Chamber of Deputies. From 2021 to 2022, she served as deputy group leader of Forza Italia.
