= Anna Carmela Minuto =

Italian politician

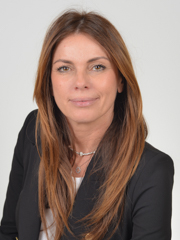
Anna Carmela Minuto in 2018.

Anna Carmela Minuto (born 28 January 1969) is an Italian politician from Forza Italia who was elected to the Italian Senate in 2018.

== Political career ==
She resigned from the Senate on 2 December 2021.
