= Danila De Lucia =

Italian politician

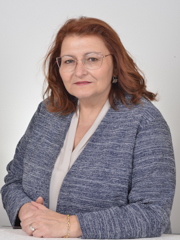

Member of the Senate
- In office 11 March 2018 – 12 October 2022

Personal details
- Born: 3 December 1961 (age 64) Benevento, Italy
- Party: Five Star Movement

Danila De Lucia (born 3 December 1961) is an Italian politician and journalist. She was a member of the Senate of the Republic for the Five Star Movement between 2018 and 2022.

== Biography ==
De Lucia was born on 3 December 1961 in Benevento. She works as a journalist and the editor of Messaggio d'oggi.

=== Political career ===
In the 2018 general election, she was elected to the Senate of the Republic for the single-member constituency of Benevento as a representative of the Five Star Movement (M5S). She received 114,051 votes, or 44.5%, defeating her nearest opponent, Alessandrina Lonardo of Forza Italia, by 30,000 votes. She was a member of the 7th permanent commission on public education and cultural heritage, the parliamentary commission investigating feminicide and other forms of gender-based violence and the parliamentary committee on regional issues. In March 2021, she became the M5S leader on the culture commission, taking over from Bianca Laura Granato. She was the first signatory on laws regarding the attribution of surnames to children, on the right to study at university, the declaration of the Arch of Trajan in Benevento as a national monument and the establishment of a National Perinatal and Infant Death Awareness Day.
