= Maria Domenica Castellone =

Italian politician (born 1975)

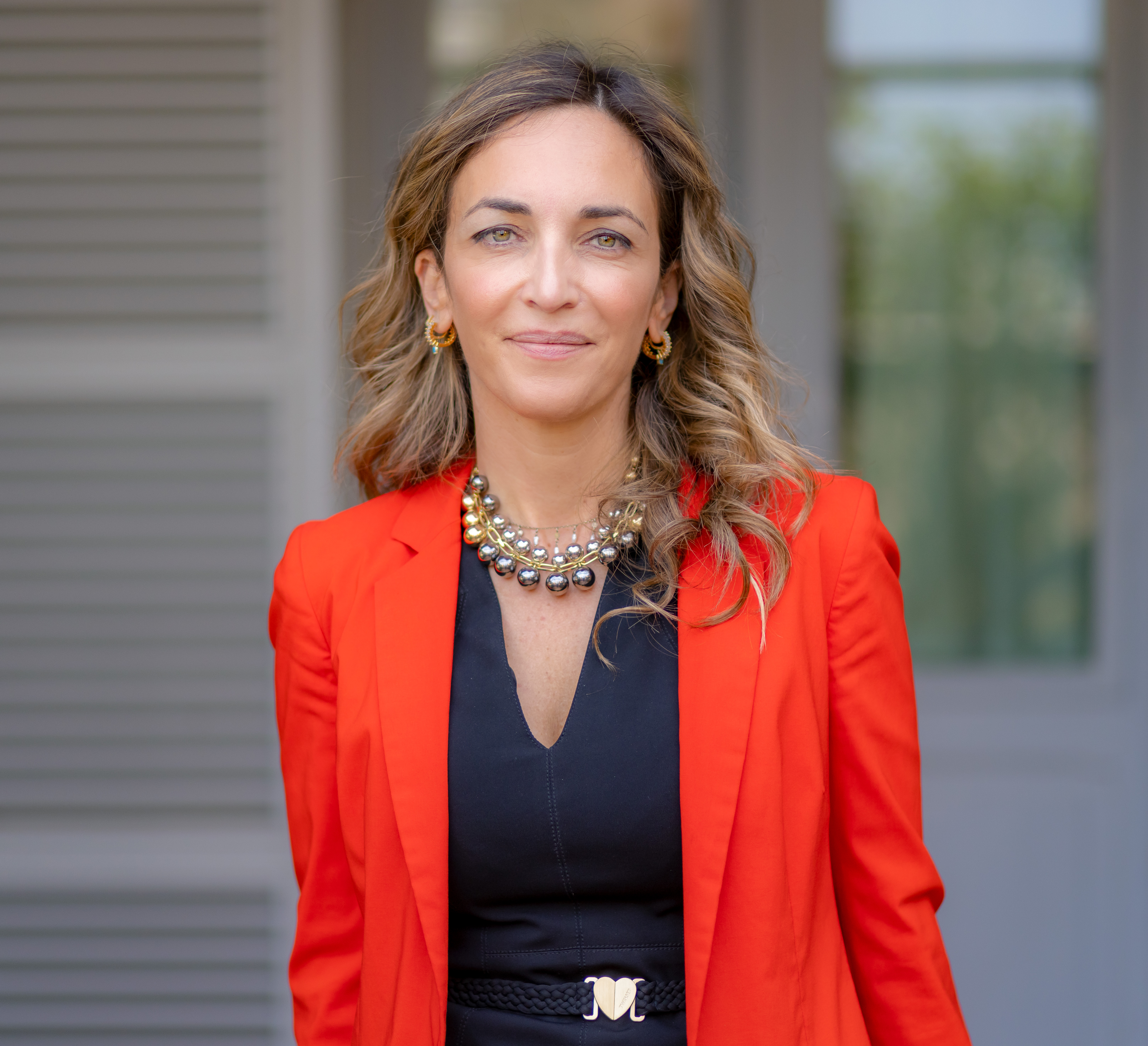
- Castellone in 2022

Member of the Senate of the Republic
- Incumbent
- Assumed office 19 October 2022

Parliamentary leader of the Five Star Movement
- Incumbent
- Assumed office 5 November 2021
- Preceded by: Ettore Licheri

Personal details
- Born: 3 April 1975 (age 50) Villaricca, Italy
- Party: Five Star Movement
- Education: University of Naples Federico II (PhD)
- Occupation: Politician; academic
- Website: mariolinacastellone.it
- Nickname: Mariolina

Maria Domenica "Mariolina" Castellone (born 3 April 1975) is an Italian academic and politician for the Five Star Movement. In November 2021, she became the first female group leader of the M5S in the Italian Senate.

== Early life and education ==
Castellone was born in Villaricca, Italy, on 3 April 1975. She graduated in Medicine and Surgery from the University of Naples Federico II in 2000, where she also earned a PhD in Oncology and Molecular Endocrinology. She then pursued further education in the United States, completing a doctorate in Molecular Oncology.

== Career ==
=== Academic ===
Since 2006, Castellone has been a researcher at the Institute of Endocrinology and Experimental Oncology of the National Research Council. She has received several awards for her research, including the Guido Berlucchi Foundation Young Researchers Award for Cancer Research, the Cecilia Cioffrese Award of the Carlo Erba Foundation, the Schlecter and Cescatti Awards of the Trentina Foundation for Cancer Research, and the Gaetano Salvatore International Award for Thyroid Pathophysiology from the Accademia Nazionale dei Lincei.

=== Political ===
Castellone entered politics with the Five Star Movement. Although she received only 49 votes in her first election in 2018, she was subsequently reinstated as a candidate and elected from Giugliano. In November 2021, Castellone contested the leadership of the Senate, including leader Ettore Licheri. She stated that her candidacy responded to requests for female leadership, saying "The time has come for a woman to lead the Senate". At the time, she was a member of the Senate Hygiene and Health Committee and had served as deputy group leader under Licheri. Castellone expressed support for Giuseppe Conte's "political direction". She characterized the contest with Licheri not as a confrontation but as a "healthy exchange" within the party.

The first vote ended in a 36–36 tie, following a disputed ballot. After internal negotiations by Conte, Licheri stepped back, and Castellone was confirmed as leader on 5 November 2021. She became the first female group leader of the Five Star Movement in the Senate.
