= Maria Virginia Tiraboschi =

Italian politician

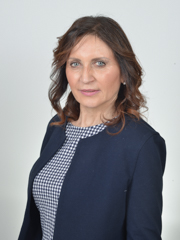

Member of the Senate
- Incumbent
- Assumed office 9 March 2018

Personal details
- Born: 5 July 1965 (age 61) Ivrea, Italy
- Party: Forza Italia
- Education: University of Turin

Maria Virginia Tiraboschi (born 5 July 1965) is an Italian politician. She has served as a senator for Forza Italia in the Senate of the Republic since 2018.

== Early life ==
Tiraboschi was born on 5 July 1965 in Ivrea to a blue-collar family. She studied at the Liceo Cadorna of Turin and received a bachelor's degree in business administration from the University of Turin in 1990 and a master's degree in local government management in 2005. She was an entrepreneur in the tourism industry and served as the director of culture and tourism for the region of Piedmont in 2011.

== Political career ==
She was first elected to the Senate of the Republic in the 2018 general election, as a candidate for the constituency of Settimo Torinese. She was a member of the centre-right coalition which was made up of four political parties, including Forza Italia. She was elected with 39.49% of the vote, defeating the Five Star Movement candidate, Pino Masciari, who received 28.36% of the vote and the Democratic Party candidate, Alberto Avetta, who received 24.89% of the vote.

She was a member of the standing committees on European Union policies and on land, environment and environmental heritage. She is currently a member of the standing committee on industry, trade and tourism and a member of the Forza Italia group.
