= Gianluca Ferrara =

Italian politician (born 1972)

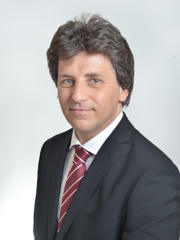
- Ferrara in 2018

Member of the Senate
- In office 23 March 2018 – 12 October 2022
- Constituency: Tuscany – P01

Personal details
- Born: 16 August 1972 (age 53)
- Party: Five Star Movement

Gianluca Ferrara (born 16 August 1972) is an Italian politician. From 2018 to 2022, he was a member of the Senate. From 2018 to 2023, he was a substitute member of the Parliamentary Assembly of the Council of Europe.
