= Francesco Zaffini =

Italian politician (born 1955)

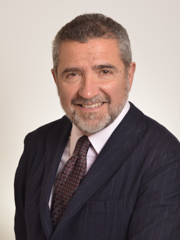
- Zaffini in 2018

Member of the Senate of the Republic
- Incumbent
- Assumed office 23 March 2018
- Constituency: Umbria

Member of the Legislative Assembly of Umbria
- In office 12 May 2000 – 10 June 2015

Personal details
- Born: 9 March 1955 (age 71) Spoleto, Province of Perugia, Italy
- Party: Brothers of Italy

Francesco Zaffini (born 9 March 1955) is an Italian politician of Brothers of Italy serving as a member of the Senate of the Republic. He was first elected in the 2018 general election, and was re-elected in 2022. Since 2022, he has chaired the Social Affairs and Health Committee.

Zaffini previously served as a member of the Legislative Assembly of Umbria from 2005 to 2015.
