= Leonardo Donno =

Italian politician (born 1985)

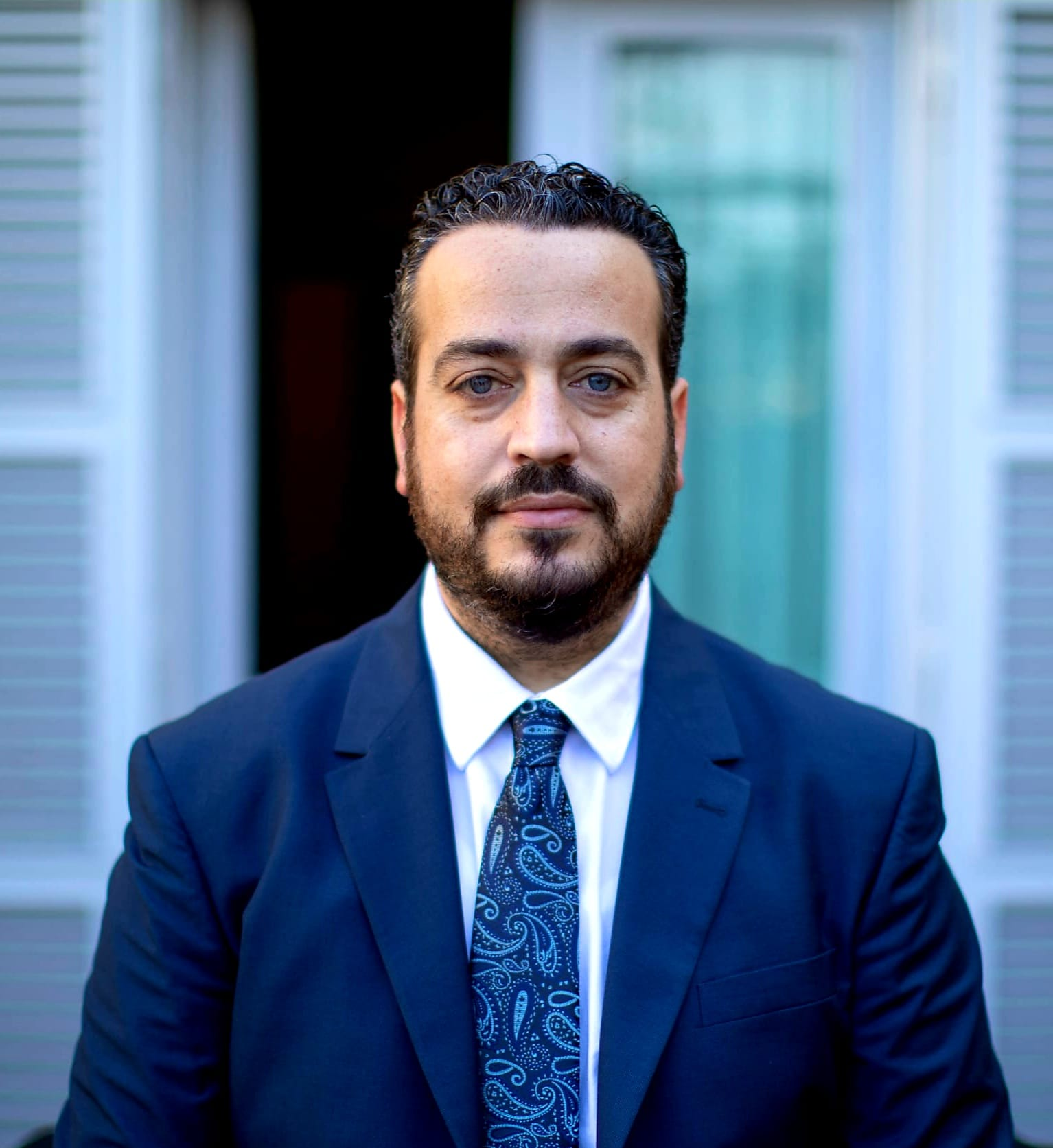
- Donno in 2021

Member of the Chamber of Deputies
- Incumbent
- Assumed office 23 March 2018
- Constituency: Apulia – P02 (2018–2022); Apulia – P04 (2022–present)

Personal details
- Born: 21 July 1985 (age 40)
- Party: Five Star Movement

Leonardo Donno (born 21 July 1985) is an Italian politician serving as a member of the Chamber of Deputies since 2018. He has served as regional coordinator of the Five Star Movement in Apulia since 2022.
