= Susy Matrisciano =

Italian politician (born 1975)

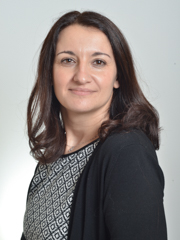
- Matrisciano in 2018

Member of the Senate
- In office 23 March 2018 – 12 October 2022
- Constituency: Piedmont – P02

Personal details
- Born: 30 August 1975 (age 51)
- Party: Five Star Movement

Mariassunta Matrisciano (born 30 August 1975), better known as Susy Matrisciano, is an Italian politician. From 2018 to 2022, she was a member of the Senate. From 2020 to 2022, she served as chairwoman of the Labour and Social Security Committee.

== Biography ==
She was born in Pomigliano d'Arco (Naples) but lives in Alessandria; she holds a degree in foreign languages and literature.

In the 2018 general election, she was elected to the Senate of the Republic (Italy) on the Five Star Movement’s ticket in the Piedmont - 02 multi-member district. Since February 5, 2020, she has served as Chair of the 11th Labor Committee.
