= Roberto Berardi =

Italian politician (born 1972)

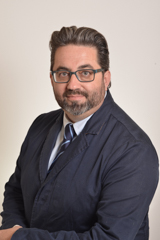
- Berardi in 2018

Member of the Senate of the Republic
- In office 23 March 2018 – 13 October 2022

Personal details
- Born: 4 June 1972 (age 53) Grosseto, Tuscany, Italy
- Party: Forza Italia
- Profession: Entrepreneur

Roberto Berardi (born 4 June 1972) is an Italian politician who served as a Senator from 23 March 2018 to 13 October 2022.

== Life and career ==
Born in Grosseto on 4 June 1972, Berardi lives in Orbetello where he works as an agricultural entrepreneur.

In 2011, he was elected for the first time as a city councilor for the municipality of Orbetello. He was re-confirmed in 2016 and 2021. From 2016 to 2018, he served as the assessor of public works. Since October 2021, he has been the vice president of the city council of Orbetello.

In the 2018 general election, Berardi was elected senator for the 18th Legislature with Forza Italia. He served as the secretary of the 4th Permanent Commission for Defense.

In the 2022 general election, he was a candidate from Forza Italia for a seat in the Chamber of Deputies, but was not elected.
