= William De Vecchis =

Italian politician

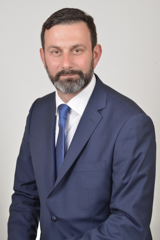
- William De Vecchis in 2018

Member of the Senate
- In office 23 March 2018 – 13 October 2022

Personal details
- Born: 28 May 1971 (age 55) Rome, Italy
- Party: Italexit (since 2022)
- Other political affiliations: Lega (2017-2022); Lega Nord (2015-2017); New Centre-Right (2013-2015); The People of Freedom (2009-2013); National Alliance (1997-2009); Tricolour Flame (1995-1997)
- Occupation: Politician

William De Vecchis (born 28 May 1971) is an Italian Senator. He is a member of the Italexit party, after leaving Lega Nord in 2022. He represents Lazio.

== Biography ==
While in school, he joined the Ostia (Rome) chapter of the Youth Front (Italy), the youth wing of the Italian Social Movement, and became active in right-wing groups in Rome.

In 1995, following Gianfranco Fini's “Fiuggi Turn,” he joined Pino Rauti's Movimento Sociale Fiamma Tricolore (MSFT). But two years later, in 1997, he left the MSFT and joined Youth Action (Italy), the youth wing of Alleanza Nazionale (AN), becoming president of its Fiumicino chapter.

In the 2003 municipal elections in Lazio, he was elected for the first time as a city councilor in Fiumicino and was subsequently re-elected in the 2008 election under the administration of Mario Canapini; in 2013, he was again elected as a councilor on the The People of Freedom ticket, receiving the highest number of votes among all candidates. In 2004 (through 2010), he was appointed, representing the municipality of Fiumicino, as a member of the advisory committee of the port authority for the ports of Civitavecchia, Fiumicino, and Gaeta. From 2005 to 2006, he served as delegate for agricultural and forestry policies, appointed by Minister Giovanni Alemanno.

In January 2014, he left the PdL and joined the New Centre-Right.

In 2015, he joined Matteo Salvini Northern League, becoming its coordinator for the province of Rome upon appointment by Claudio Durigon.
