= Davide Bellomo =

Italian politician (born 1970)

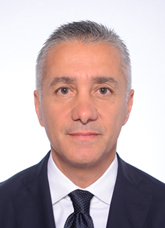
- Bellomo in 2022

Member of the Chamber of Deputies
- Incumbent
- Assumed office 13 October 2022
- Constituency: Apulia – 05

Personal details
- Born: 18 February 1970 (age 56)
- Party: Forza Italia (since 2025)
- Parent: Michele Bellomo (father)

Davide Bellomo (born 18 February 1970) is an Italian politician serving as a member of the Chamber of Deputies since 2022. He is the son of Michele Bellomo.
