= Daisy Pirovano =

Italian politician

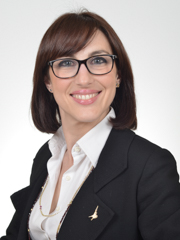
- Daisy Pirovano in 2018

Member of the Senate
- Incumbent
- Assumed office 23 March 2018
- Constituency: 7 (Bergamo)

Mayor of Misano di Gera d'Adda
- In office 8 June 2009 – 10 June 2024

Personal details
- Born: 19 December 1977 (age 48) Romano di Lombardia, Italy
- Party: Lega Nord

Daisy Pirovano (born 19 December 1977) is an Italian politician who is currently a member of the Senate of the Republic from Lega Nord. She was first elected in the 2018 Italian general election and was re-elected in the 2022 Italian general election.

== See also ==
- List of members of the Senate of Italy, 2018–2022
- List of members of the Senate of Italy, 2022–present
