= Gisella Naturale =

Italian politician (born 1969)

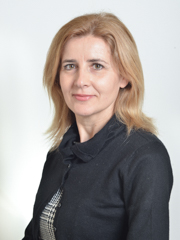
- Naturale in 2018

Member of the Senate
- Incumbent
- Assumed office 23 March 2018
- Constituency: Apulia – P01 (2018–2022); Apulia – P01 (2022–present)

Personal details
- Born: 3 June 1969 (age 57)
- Party: Five Star Movement

Gisella Naturale (born 3 June 1969) is an Italian politician serving as a member of the Senate since 2018. She has served as deputy chairwoman of the European Union affairs committee since 2025.
