= Gabriella Di Girolamo =

Italian politician (born 1977)

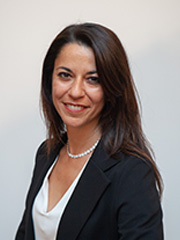
- Di Girolamo in 2022

Member of the Senate
- Incumbent
- Assumed office 23 March 2018
- Constituency: Abruzzo – P01

Personal details
- Born: 15 May 1977 (age 48)
- Party: Five Star Movement

Gabriella Di Girolamo (born 15 May 1977) is an Italian politician serving as a member of the Senate since 2018. She has served as secretary of the Five Star Movement group in the Senate since 2022.
