= Mauro D'Attis =

Italian politician

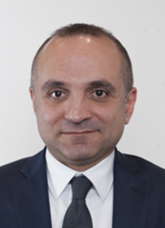

Mauro D'Attis (born 30 July 1973) is an Italian politician who has been a member of the Italian Parliament since 2018.

== Biography ==
D'Attis was born in Brindisi. After graduating from a commercial technical institute, he worked first as an insurance and financial promoter, then as a commercial and marketing consultant. In 2009, he graduated in Banking, Finance and Insurance Economics at the University of Salento.

== Career ==
From 2009 to 2012, he held positions in the Office of the President of the ANCI, being delegated by the national president, Sergio Chiamparino, for Economic Development.

In the municipal elections of 2012, he ran for mayor of Brindisi as part of the center-right coalition, securing 25.68% of the votes and facing defeat in the first round by the center-left candidate, Cosimo Consales, who obtained 53.17% of the votes. Nevertheless, he was re-elected as a councillor.

In July 2012, he was appointed as a member of the European Committee of the Regions in Brussels, participating in the ENVE commissions on the environment, climate change, and energy.

In the municipal elections of 2016, he was re-elected as a city councillor of Brindisi for Forza Italia, after joining the party following the dissolution of the PdL, with a total of 556 preferences.

From February to October 2016 and from June 2017 to June 2018, he also served as the councillor for the budget of the municipality of Roccafiorita, in the province of Messina, in the council chaired by Giuseppe Santo Russo.

In the general elections of 2018, he was elected to the Chamber of Deputies in the plurinominal constituency Puglia - 03 as the leader of Forza Italia. During the 18th Legislature, he joined the Budget Commission of the Chamber and subsequently became a classroom delegate of the parliamentary group of Forza Italia. From 13 November 2018 to 4 February 2019, he was also a member of the Parliamentary Commission for regional issues, and from 4 February 2019 to 12 October 2022, he was a member of the Parliamentary Commission for simplification.

In October 2018, he was appointed as the regional commissioner of Forza Italia for Puglia.

In the general elections of 2022, he ran again for the Chamber of Deputies in the single-member constituency Puglia - 07 (Taranto) for the center-right (Forza Italia share), and also as a leader in the multi-nominal constituency Puglia - 04. He was elected in the single-member election with 44.09% of the votes, ahead of Salvatore Giuliano of the Movimento 5 Stelle (29.35%) and Elena Tiziana Brigante of the center-left (19.02%).

On 23 May 2023, he was appointed Vice President of the Anti-Mafia Commission.
