= Carla Giuliano =

Italian politician

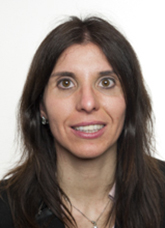

Deputy of the Italian Republic
- Incumbent
- Assumed office 23 March 2018

Personal details
- Born: 2 April 1983 (age 43) San Severo, Italy
- Party: Five Star Movement
- Education: University of Perugia
- Occupation: Politician, lawyer

Carla Giuliano (born 2 April 1983) is an Italian politician. She was elected as a member of the Five Star Movement and has sat in the Chamber of Deputies since 2018.

== Biography ==
She was born in San Severo.

== See also ==
- List of members of the Italian Chamber of Deputies, 2018–
