= Daniele Manca =

Italian politician (born 1969)

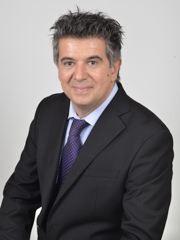
- Manca in 2018

Member of the Senate
- Incumbent
- Assumed office 23 March 2018
- Constituency: Emilia-Romagna – 01 (2018–2022); Emilia-Romagna – 02 (2022–present)

Personal details
- Born: 16 May 1969 (age 57)
- Party: Democratic Party (since 2007)

Daniele Manca (born 16 May 1969) is an Italian politician serving as a member of the Senate since 2018. From 1994 to 2004, he served as mayor of Dozza. From 2008 to 2018, he served as mayor of Imola.
