= Paolo Tosato =

Italian politician

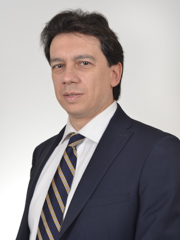
Paolo Tosato in 2018.

Paolo Tosato (born 8 September 1972) is an Italian politician. He has been Senator in the Italian Senate since 2014.

In 2016 Tosato presented a resolution against sanctions imposed on Russia. He was listed as a recipient of thousands of euros for passing the resolution in leaked emails of Russia's International Agency for Current Policy. He strongly refuted the accusation. Similar resolutions, have previously been presented in other circumstances by other politicians as in the Regional Council of Veneto.
