= Barbara Guidolin =

Italian politician (born 1975)

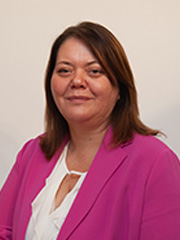
- Guidolin in 2022

Member of the Senate
- Incumbent
- Assumed office 23 March 2018
- Constituency: Veneto – P02 (2018–2022); Veneto – P02 (2022–present)

Personal details
- Born: 21 September 1975 (age 50)
- Party: Five Star Movement

Barbara Guidolin (born 21 September 1975) is an Italian politician serving as a member of the Senate since 2018. From 2018 to 2023, she was a substitute member of the Parliamentary Assembly of the Council of Europe.

== Biography ==
Born in Bassano del Grappa, in the province of Vicenza, she currently lives in Rosà. After earning her technical diploma in tourism services from the “Remondini (firm)” Institute, she has worked as an office clerk, a metalworker, a bartender, and a social and health care worker.
