= Davide Galantino =

Italian politician (born 1979)

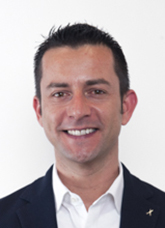
- Galantino in 2018

Member of the Chamber of Deputies
- In office 23 March 2018 – 12 October 2022
- Constituency: Apulia – P01

Personal details
- Born: 19 January 1979 (age 47)
- Party: Brothers of Italy (since 2019)
- Other political affiliations: Five Star Movement (2015–2019)

Davide Galantino (born 19 January 1979) is an Italian politician. From 2018 to 2022, he was a member of the Chamber of Deputies. He has been a member of Brothers of Italy since 2019, and was a member of the Five Star Movement until 2019.
