= Giovanni Maiorano =

Italian politician (born 1974)

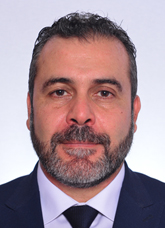
- Maiorano in 2022

Member of the Chamber of Deputies
- Incumbent
- Assumed office 13 October 2022
- Constituency: Apulia – 03

Personal details
- Born: 26 September 1974 (age 51)
- Party: Brothers of Italy

Luigi Giovanni Maiorano (born 26 September 1974) is an Italian politician serving as a member of the Chamber of Deputies since 2022. From 2009 to 2024, he served as deputy mayor of Maruggio.
