= Giandonato La Salandra =

Italian politician (born 1978)

Member of the Chamber of Deputies
- Incumbent
- Assumed office 13 October 2022
- Constituency: Apulia – 01

Personal details
- Born: 29 September 1978 (age 47)
- Party: Brothers of Italy

Giandonato La Salandra (born 29 September 1978) is an Italian politician serving as a member of the Chamber of Deputies since 2022. He founded the Brothers of Italy branch in the province of Foggia in 2013, and served as provincial secretary of the party from 2017 to 2021. From 2010 to 2012, he served as president of Young Italy in the province.

== Biography ==
He earned his law degree from the University of Foggia in 2004, with a thesis in commercial law titled “Corporate Crisis and Credit Protection Techniques.” In 2002, he was elected as an academic senator at the University after being elected to the Law School Council on the student right-wing ticket. In 2007, he was admitted to the bar. In 2010, he became certified to conduct civil and corporate mediation pursuant to Ministerial Decree 28/2010. From 2006 to 2008, he was a partner at the law firm Avvocati Sannoner, Franchini & Associati. Since 2009, he has been a partner at the Silvana Sinigaglia Law Firm. An activist with the Youth Front since 1994, he served as provincial president of Young Italy (2009) for the province of Foggia from 2010 to 2012. In 2013, he founded the provincial chapter of Brothers of Italy in Foggia, and in 2017 he became its secretary.

Chairman of the Board of Directors of the Foggia Public Transportation Company from 2019 to 2021.

In the 2022 general election, he was elected to the Chamber of Deputies as a member of Brothers of Italy in the multi-member district 01 of Puglia.
