= Gianni Pietro Girotto =

Italian politician (born 1967)

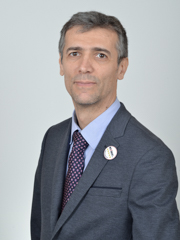
- Girotto in 2018

Member of the Senate
- In office 15 March 2013 – 12 October 2022
- Constituency: Veneto (2013–2018); Veneto – P01 (2018–2022)

Personal details
- Born: 12 November 1967 (age 58)
- Party: Five Star Movement

Gianni Pietro Girotto (born 12 November 1967) is an Italian politician. From 2013 to 2022, he was a member of the Senate. From 2018 to 2022, he served as chairman of the Industry, Trade and Tourism Committee.
