= Giandiego Gatta =

Italian politician

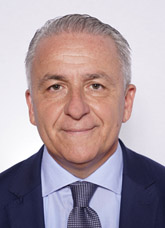

Member of the Chamber of Deputies
- Incumbent
- Assumed office 13 October 2022

Personal details
- Born: 10 April 1964 (age 62) Manfredonia, Italy
- Party: Forza Italia (present- )
- Profession: Politician, lawyer

Giacomo Diego "Giandiego" Gatta (born 10 April 1964) is an Italian politician, member of the Chamber of Deputies from 2022.

== Biography ==
Gatta was born in Manfredonia, province of Foggia, Apulia, Southern Italy.
