= Tommaso Cerno =

Italian journalist and politician (born 1975)

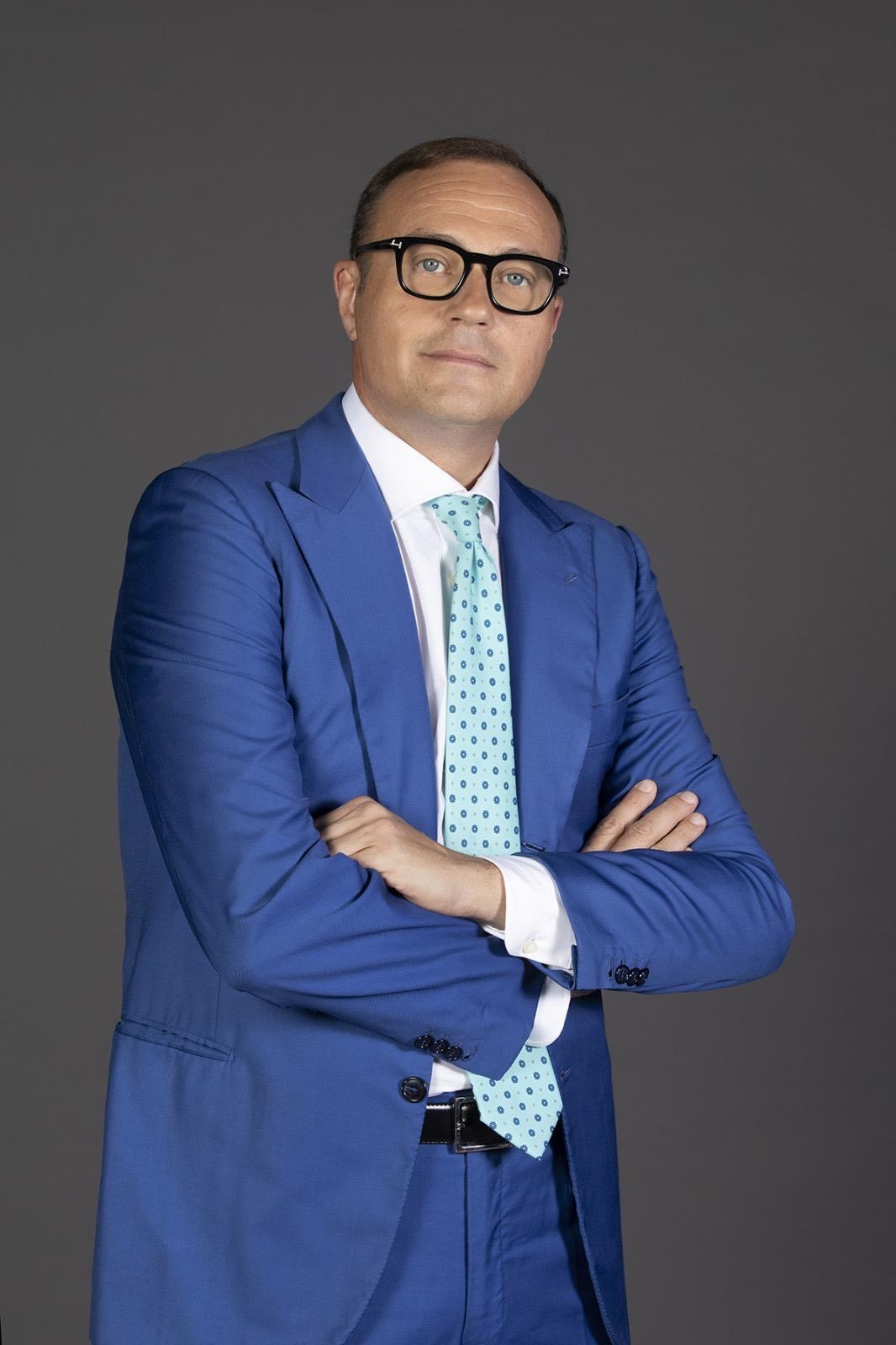
- Cerno in 2026

Member of the Senate
- In office 23 March 2018 – 12 October 2022
- Constituency: Lombardy – U01

Personal details
- Born: 28 January 1975 (age 51)
- Party: Independent (2020–2021, 2022–present)
- Other political affiliations: AN (1995); PD (2018–2020, 2021–2022); IV (2020)

Tommaso Cerno (born 28 January 1975) is an Italian journalist and politician serving as editor-in-chief of il Giornale since 2025. From 2018 to 2022, he was a member of the Senate.
