= Maria Cristina Cantù =

Italian politician (born 1964)

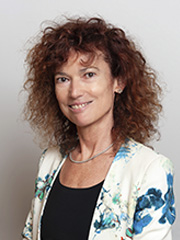
- Cantù in 2022

Member of the Senate
- Incumbent
- Assumed office 23 March 2018
- Constituency: Lombardy – U02 (2018–2022); Lombardy – P01 (2022–present)

Personal details
- Born: 21 December 1964 (age 61) Varese
- Party: Lega
- Education: University of Milan

Maria Cristina Cantù (born 21 December 1964) is an Italian politician serving as a member of the Senate since 2018. She has served as deputy chairwoman of the Social Affairs Committee since 2022.
