= Roberto Rampi =

Italian politician (born 1977)

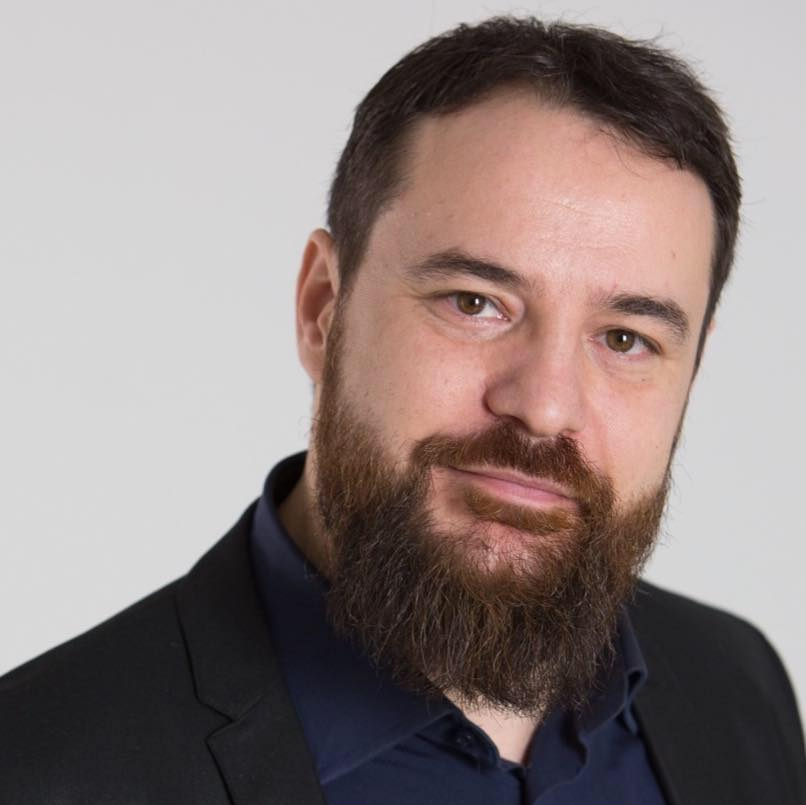
- Rampi in 2018

Member of the Senate
- In office 23 March 2018 – 12 October 2022
- Constituency: Lombardy – P05

Member of the Chamber of Deputies
- In office 15 March 2013 – 22 March 2018
- Constituency: Lombardy 1

Personal details
- Born: 17 September 1977 (age 48)
- Party: Democratic Party

Roberto Rampi (born 17 September 1977) is an Italian politician. From 2018 to 2022, he was a member of the Senate. From 2013 to 2018, he was a member of the Chamber of Deputies.
