= Patty L'Abbate =

Italian politician (born 1966)

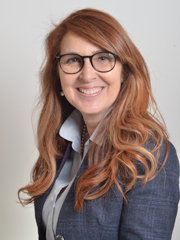
- L'Abbate in 2018

Member of the Chamber of Deputies
- Incumbent
- Assumed office 13 October 2022
- Constituency: Apulia – P03

Member of the Senate
- In office 23 March 2018 – 12 October 2022
- Constituency: Apulia – U04

Personal details
- Born: 2 May 1966 (age 60)
- Party: Five Star Movement

Pasqua L'Abbate (born 2 May 1966), better known as Patty L'Abbate, is an Italian politician serving as a member of the Chamber of Deputies since 2022. From 2018 to 2022, she was a member of the Senate.
