= Gianluigi Paragone =

Italian politician and journalist (born 1971)

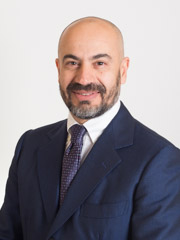

Member of the Senate
- In office 23 March 2018 – 13 October 2022
- Constituency: Lombardy

Personal details
- Born: 7 August 1971 (age 55) Varese, Lombardy, Italy
- Party: M5S (2017–2020); Italexit (2020–2023)
- Profession: Politician; journalist

Gianluigi Paragone (born 7 August 1971) is an Italian politician and journalist.

== Biography ==
Paragone was born in Varese in 1971. After working as a journalist for a local newspaper and a local television network, Paragone became editor of La Padania, the official newspaper of the Northern League. Subsequently, he worked for the newspaper Libero, of which he was deputy editor and (for a short period) acting editor to replace Vittorio Feltri.

In 2009, he presented the political talk show Malpensa Italia, aired in late evening on Rai 2. On 5 August 2009 he was appointed deputy director of Rai 1, thus abandoning the management of Libero. On 24 September 2009, Paragone left the Rai 1 vice-direction to become vice-director of Rai 2.

From 15 January 2010, he led the political talk show L'ultima parola on Rai 2. In 2013, he resigned as deputy director of Rai 2 and left the RAI. Subsequently, he switched to La7, where he led the talk shows La gabbia (2013–2017) and In onda (2015).

From 7 April 2014 to 3 February 2017, together with Mara Maionchi and Ylenia Baccaro, he led Benvenuti nella giungla on Radio 105.

In 2018, he was elected Senator among the ranks of the Five Star Movement, and on 1 January 2020, was officially expelled from this party, but continued his membership in the Senate as an independent. In July 2020, Paragone launched his own political party, Italexit, with the aim of bringing Italy out of the European Union.
