= Tommaso Nannicini =

Italian politician (born 1973)

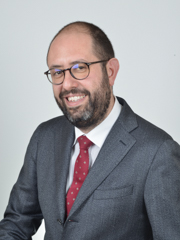
- Nannicini in 2018

Member of the Senate
- In office 23 March 2018 – 12 October 2022
- Constituency: Lombardy – P04

Personal details
- Born: 11 November 1973 (age 52)
- Party: Democratic Party
- Parent: Rolando Nannicini (father)

Tommaso Nannicini (born 11 November 1973) is an Italian politician. From 2018 to 2022, he was a member of the Senate. From January to December 2016, he served as undersecretary to the Presidency of the Council of Ministers. He is the son of Rolando Nannicini.
