= Gianluca Castaldi =

Italian politician (born 1970)

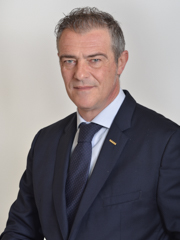
- Castaldi in 2018

Member of the Senate
- In office 15 March 2013 – 12 October 2022
- Constituency: Abruzzo (2013–2018); Abruzzo – P01 (2018–2022)

Personal details
- Born: 27 June 1970 (age 55)
- Party: Five Star Movement

Gianluca Castaldi (born 27 June 1970) is an Italian politician. From 2013 to 2022, he was a member of the Senate. From 2019 to 2021, he served as undersecretary for parliamentary relations.
