= Gianmauro Dell'Olio =

Italian politician (born 1968)

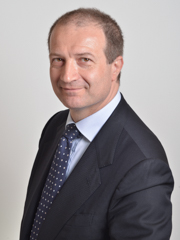
- Dell'Olio in 2018

Member of the Chamber of Deputies
- Incumbent
- Assumed office 13 October 2022
- Constituency: Apulia – P02

Member of the Senate
- In office 23 March 2018 – 12 October 2022
- Constituency: Apulia – U01

Personal details
- Born: 7 March 1968 (age 58)
- Party: Five Star Movement

Gianmauro Dell'Olio (born 7 March 1968) is an Italian politician serving as a member of the Chamber of Deputies since 2022. From 2018 to 2022, he was a member of the Senate.
