= Nadia Ginetti =

Italian politician (born 1969)

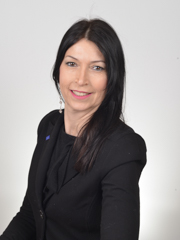
Nadia Ginetti in 2018

Nadia Ginetti (born 25 February 1969) is an Italian politician. She is a senator from Italia Viva.
