= Alessandro Alfieri =

Italian politician (born 1972)

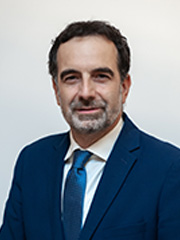
- Alfieri in 2022

Member of the Senate
- Incumbent
- Assumed office 23 March 2018
- Constituency: Lombardy – 03 (2018–2022); Lombardy – 01 (2022–present)

Personal details
- Born: 2 February 1972 (age 54) Varese, Italy
- Party: Democratic Party (since 2007)

Alessandro Alfieri (born 2 February 1972) is an Italian politician serving as a member of the Senate since 2018. From 2010 to 2018, he was a member of the Regional Council of Lombardy.

== Biography ==
He was born on February 2, 1972, in Varese, where he attended the “Ernesto Cairoli” classical high school and still lives today. He earned a degree in business administration from Bocconi University. In 1997, after winning a competitive exam, he began his diplomatic career, working for four years at the Ministry of Foreign Affairs in Rome, in the Balkans, and in the Horn of Africa. He then worked for the Province of Milan on the international promotion of Milan bid for Expo 2015.

He is married and has a daughter named Asia.
