= Carlo Martelli (politician) =

Italian politician

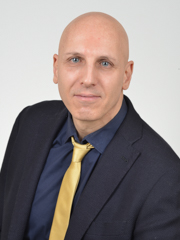
Carlo Martelli in 2018.

Carlo Martelli (born 23 May 1966) was an Italian Senator from 2013 to 2022. He is a member of the Italexit party, formerly of the Five Star Movement. He represented Piedmont.
