= Michela Montevecchi =

Italian politician

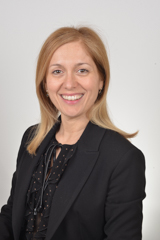

Senator from Emilia Romagna
- Incumbent
- Assumed office 2013

Personal details
- Born: Michela Antonia Montevecchi; 21 April 1971 (age 55) Bologna
- Party: Five Star Movement

Michela Antonia Montevecchi (born April 21, 1971) is an Italian politician.

She was elected to the Senate in the seventeenth Legislature with the 5 Star Movement in 2013, as the leading candidate of the district of Emilia Romagna.

She was re-elected to the Senate in the eighteenth Legislature with the 5 Star Movement in 2018.

On March 28, 2018, she was elected secretary to the president of the Senate.

On June 21, 2018, she was elected vice president of the Public Education and Cultural Heritage Commission.

== Works ==
- A sociolinguistic investigation into the meaning of peace: An investigation into the meaning of Peace in South African and Italian teenagers, Edizioni Accademiche Italiane, February 23, 2014, ISBN 9783639652994
