= Massimo Minervin =

Italian sailor (born 1939)

Massimo Minervin (born 30 March 1939) is an Italian former sailor who competed in the 1964 Summer Olympics.
