= Dario Stefano =

Italian politician (born 1963)

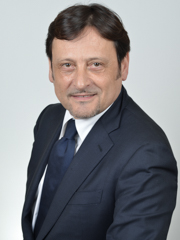

Member of the Senate
- In office 15 March 2013 – 13 October 2022

Personal details
- Born: 2 August 1963 (age 63) Scorrano, Italy
- Party: DL (2005–2007); Independent (2007–2018); PD (2018-2022)
- Education: University of Siena
- Occupation: Manager, politician, academic

Dario Stefano (born 2 August 1963) is an Italian politician. Graduated in Economy, Stefano is a member of the Apulian division of the General Confederation of Italian Industry and taught Economics and Industrial Accounting at the University of Salento.

== Biography ==
After the 2005 Apulian regional elections, Stefano was elected regional councillor with The Daisy, supporting the centre-left candidate Nichi Vendola, who is elected governor. In 2009, he was appointed by Vendola himself as Councilor for Agri-food Resources.

He was later reconfirmed in the Apulian Regional Assembly after the 2010 regional elections as leader of the political association La Puglia in Più and was reappointed Councilor for Agri-food Resources in the second Vendola's junta.

During the 2013 elections, La Puglia in Più made a political agreement with Vendola's Left Ecology Freedom, and Stefano was elected senator as independent in the SEL list.

On 5 June 2013, Stefano was appointed president of the Junta for the Elections, Authorizations and Immunities of the Senate: the junta has been later appointed to deliberate about Silvio Berlusconi's senatorial decadence.

On 18 July 2014, Stefano was a candidate for the centre-left primaries to choose Vendola's successor as gubernatorial candidate, together with the former mayor of Bari Michele Emiliano and the former mayor of Molfetta Guglielmo Minervini, both from the Democratic Party. During the primaries, Stefano received support from Vendola himself, from actress Helen Mirren and director Taylor Hackford, owners of a house in Apulia. Stefano manages to reach the second place, being defeated by Emiliano, who was later elected governor after the 2015 regional elections.

In 2017, Stefano didn't join the new Italian Left party and, with the 2018 elections, was re-elected senator with the Democratic Party.
