= Marco Pellegrini (politician) =

Italian politician (born 1964)

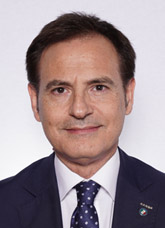
- Pellegrini in 2022

Member of the Chamber of Deputies
- Incumbent
- Assumed office 13 October 2022
- Constituency: Apulia – U01

Member of the Senate
- In office 23 March 2018 – 12 October 2022
- Constituency: Apulia – U08

Personal details
- Born: 30 July 1964 (age 61)
- Party: Five Star Movement

Marco Pellegrini (born 30 July 1964) is an Italian politician serving as a member of the Chamber of Deputies since 2022. From 2018 to 2022, he was a member of the Senate.
