= Mario Giarrusso =

Italian politician

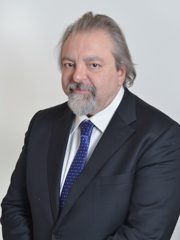
Senator Mario Giarrusso in 2018.

Mario Michele Giarrusso (born 25 February 1965) was an Italian Senator. He is a member of the Italexit party, after being expelled from the Five Star Movement. He represents Sicily.
