= Saverio Congedo =

Italian politician (born 1965)

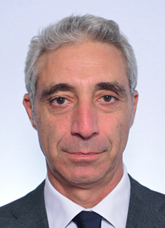
- Congedo in 2022

Member of the Chamber of Deputies
- Incumbent
- Assumed office 13 October 2022
- Constituency: Apulia – 09

Personal details
- Born: 15 February 1965 (age 61)
- Party: Brothers of Italy (since 2017)

Saverio Congedo (born 15 February 1965) is an Italian politician serving as a member of the Chamber of Deputies since 2022. From 2000 to 2020, he was a member of the Regional Council of Apulia.
