= Stefano Collina =

Italian politician (born 1966)

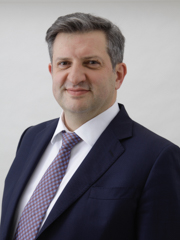
- Collina in 2018

Member of the Senate
- In office 15 March 2013 – 12 October 2022
- Constituency: Emilia-Romagna (2013–2018); Emilia-Romagna – U02 (2018–2022)

Personal details
- Born: 28 December 1966 (age 59)
- Party: Democratic Party (since 2007)

Stefano Collina (born 28 December 1966) is an Italian politician. From 2013 to 2022, he was a member of the Senate. From February to July 2020, he served as chairman of the Hygiene and Health Committee.
