= Anna Rossomando =

Italian politician (born 1963)

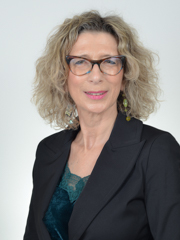

Member of the Senate of the Republic
- Incumbent
- Assumed office 23 March 2018

Member of the Chamber of Deputies
- In office 29 April 2008 – 23 March 2018

Personal details
- Born: 30 June 1963 (age 63) Turin, Italy
- Party: PCI (1977–1991); PDS (1991–1998); DS (1998–2007); PD (since 2007)
- Education: University of Turin
- Occupation: Politician, lawyer

Anna Rossomando (born 30 June 1963) is an Italian politician from the Democratic Party (PD) who is serving as the vice president of the Senate of the Republic since 2018. From 2008 to 2018, she was a member of the Chamber of Deputies. A member of the left wing of the PD, she began her career in the youth wing of the Italian Communist Party (PCI) and remained within the party through its various legal successors.

== Early life ==
Rossomando was born on 30 June 1963 in Turin, the city where she still lives. She graduated with a laurea (post-secondary academic degree) in Law from the University of Turin in 1989. She worked as a criminal lawyer and holds a law firm based in Turin.

== Career ==
In 1977, at the age of 14, Rossomando joined the Italian Communist Youth Federation, the youth wing of the PCI, of which she later became a member. She remained in the party through its transformations into the Democratic Party of the Left (PDS), the Democrats of the Left (DS), and finally the PD. From 1997 to 2006, Rossomando was a city councilor in Turin during the second mayoral term of Valentino Castellani and the first mayoral term of Sergio Chiamparino.

At the 2008 Italian general election, Rossomando was elected to the Chamber of Deputies, being re-elected at the 2013 Italian general election. At the 2018 Italian general election, Rossomando was elected to the Senate and became its vice president. As a member of the left wing of the PD, Rossomando gave her support to Andrea Orlando during the 2017 PD leadership election, and supported eventual winner Nicola Zingaretti at the 2019 PD leadership election.
