= Alessandrina Lonardo =

Italian politician

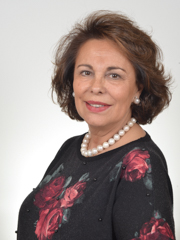

Senator of the Legislature XVIII of Italy
- Incumbent
- Assumed office 23 March 2018

Personal details
- Born: 9 March 1953 (age 73) Ceppaloni

Alessandrina Lonardo (born 9 March 1953, in Ceppaloni), also known as Sandra Lonardo, is an Italian politician. She is a senator of the Republic of Italy and a member of the Legislature XVIII of Italy.

== Biography ==
Born in the hamlet of San Giovanni, in the municipality of Ceppaloni, she grew up in her hometown. At the age of 12, she moved with her family to Oyster Bay, on Long Island in Nassau County (United States), continuing her studies at Oyster Bay High School. Once back in Italy, she obtained the high school diploma and graduated in Philosophy at the Oriental University Institute of Naples.
