= Mayor of Bari =

Mayor of the city of Bari in Apulia, Italy

- Sindaco di Bari

- Incumbent; Vito Leccese (PD) since 9 July 2024
- Residence: Palazzo di Città
- Appointer: Popular election
- Term length: 5 years, renewable once
- Formation: September 1860
- Website: Official website

The mayor of Bari is an elected politician who, along with the Bari's city council, is accountable for the strategic government of Bari in Apulia, Italy, the biggest city of the region.

The current mayor is Vito Leccese from the Democratic Party, who took office on 9 July 2024.

== Overview ==
According to the Italian Constitution, the mayor of Bari is member of the city council.

The mayor is elected by the population of Bari, who also elects the members of the city council, controlling the mayor's policy guidelines and is able to enforce his resignation by a motion of no confidence. The mayor is entitled to appoint and release the members of his government.

Since 1995 the mayor is elected directly by Bari's electorate: in all mayoral elections in Italy in cities with a population higher than 15,000 the voters express a direct choice for the mayor or an indirect choice voting for the party of the candidate's coalition. If no candidate receives at least 50% of votes, the top two candidates go to a second round after two weeks. The election of the city council is based on a direct choice for the candidate with a preference vote: the candidate with the majority of the preferences is elected. The number of the seats for each party is determined proportionally.

== Republic of Italy (since 1946) ==
=== City Council election (1946-1995) ===
From 1946 to 1995, the Mayor of Bari was elected by the City Council.

	Mayor	Term start	Term end	Party
1	Vito Antonio Di Cagno	21 December 1946	23 June 1952	DC
2	Francesco Chieco	23 June 1952	14 July 1956	PNM
3	Nicola Damiani	14 July 1956	28 March 1957	DC
4	Renato Dell'Andro	25 July 1959	14 December 1959	DC
5	Giuseppe Papalia	21 December 1959	23 July 1960	PSI
(4)	Renato Dell'Andro	1 August 1960	25 July 1961	DC
6	Pasquale Prestipino	31 July 1961	5 September 1962	DC
7	Vitantonio Lozupone	5 September 1962	5 August 1964	DC
8	Gennaro Trisorio Liuzzi	29 September 1964	30 July 1970	DC
9	Antonio Laforgia	14 October 1970	23 January 1971	DC
10	Nicola Vernola	4 October 1971	8 May 1976	DC
11	Nicola Lamaddalena	12 October 1976	27 July 1978	DC
12	Luigi Farace	28 July 1978	27 September 1981	DC
13	Francesco De Lucia	28 September 1981	21 March 1990	PSI
14	Enrico Dalfino	11 August 1990	28 December 1991	DC
15	Daniela Mazzucca	13 January 1992	30 November 1992	PSI
16	Pietro Laforgia	28 January 1993	6 September 1993	PDS
17	Michele Buquicchio	3 November 1993	6 June 1994	DC
18	Giovanni Memola	15 November 1994	22 June 1995	PSI

=== Direct election (since 1995) ===
Since 1995, under provisions of new local administration law, the Mayor of Bari is chosen by direct election, originally every four, and later every five years.

	Mayor of Bari	Took office	Left office	Party	Coalition	Election
19	Simeone Di Cagno; Abbrescia (1944–2024)	22 June 1995	14 June 1999	FI	Pole for Freedoms (FI-AN-CCD-PPI)	1995
19	Simeone Di Cagno; Abbrescia (1944–2024)	14 June 1999	14 June 2004	FI	Pole for Freedoms (FI-AN-CCD)	1999
20	Michele Emiliano (b. 1959)	14 June 2004	23 June 2009	DS; PD	The Olive Tree (DS-DL-PRC-SDI)	2004
20	Michele Emiliano (b. 1959)	23 June 2009	23 June 2014	DS; PD	PD • IdV • SEL	2009
21	Antonio Decaro (b. 1970)	23 June 2014	21 June 2019	PD	PD • SEL • CD and leftist lists	2014
21	Antonio Decaro (b. 1970)	21 June 2019	9 July 2024	PD	PD • SI and leftist lists	2019
22	Vito Leccese (b. 1962)	9 July 2024	In office	PD	PD and leftist lists	2024
