= Meloni government =

Government of Italy since 2022

- 68th Cabinet of Italy
- Incumbent
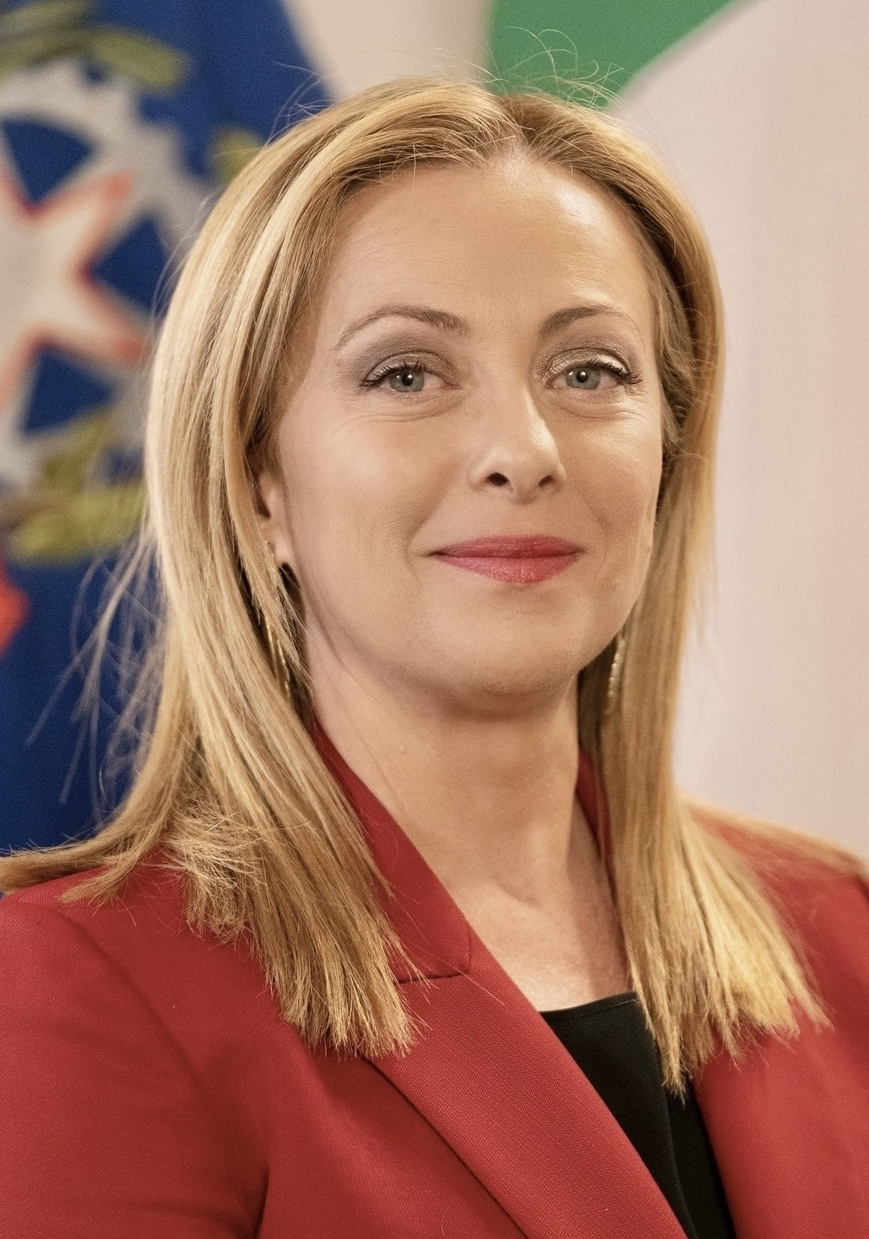
- Date formed: 22 October 2022 (4 years ago)

People and organisations
- Head of state: Sergio Mattarella
- Head of government: Giorgia Meloni
- Deputy head of government: Antonio Tajani; Matteo Salvini
- No. of ministers: 25 (incl. Prime Minister)
- Ministers removed: 3 resigned
- Member parties: FdI; Lega; FI; NM
- Status in legislature: Majority (coalition)
- Opposition parties: PD; M5S; IV; AVS; A; FN; +E

History
- Incoming formation: 2022 government formation
- Election: 2022 election
- Legislature term: XIX Legislature (2022–present)
- Predecessor: Draghi government

The Meloni government is the 68th and current government of the Italian Republic, the first headed by Giorgia Meloni, leader of Brothers of Italy, who is also the first woman to hold the office of Prime Minister of Italy. The government was sworn in on 22 October 2022. It was one of the fastest government formations in the history of the Italian Republic. It was variously described as a shift to the political right, as well as the first far-right-led coalition in Italy since World War II. In September 2026, it became the longest-serving government in the history of the Italian Republic. (Note: Italy's constitutional custom and jurisprudence defines a Government's length as the consecutive period between the formal nomination of the Government and its formal resignation; when a Prime Minister serves non-consecutive terms, or resigns in the midst of a government crisis or cabinet reshuffle only to be immediately re-appointed, those are counted as separate Governments.)

== Supporting parties ==
Party	Main ideology	Leader
Government parties
Brothers of Italy (FdI)	National conservatism	Giorgia Meloni
League (Lega)	Right-wing populism	Matteo Salvini
Forza Italia (FI)	Liberal conservatism	Silvio Berlusconi (died on 12 June 2023); Antonio Tajani (since 15 July 2023)
Parties with secondary government positions
Us Moderates (NM)	Liberal conservatism	Maurizio Lupi
External support
Union of the Centre (UDC)	Christian democracy	Lorenzo Cesa
Coraggio Italia (CI)	Liberal conservatism	Luigi Brugnaro
Associative Movement of Italians Abroad (MAIE)	Italians abroad interests	Ricardo Merlo
Animalist Movement (MA)	Animal rights	Michela Vittoria Brambilla
South calls North (ScN) (since 2026)	Regionalism	Cateno De Luca

== History ==
=== Government formation ===
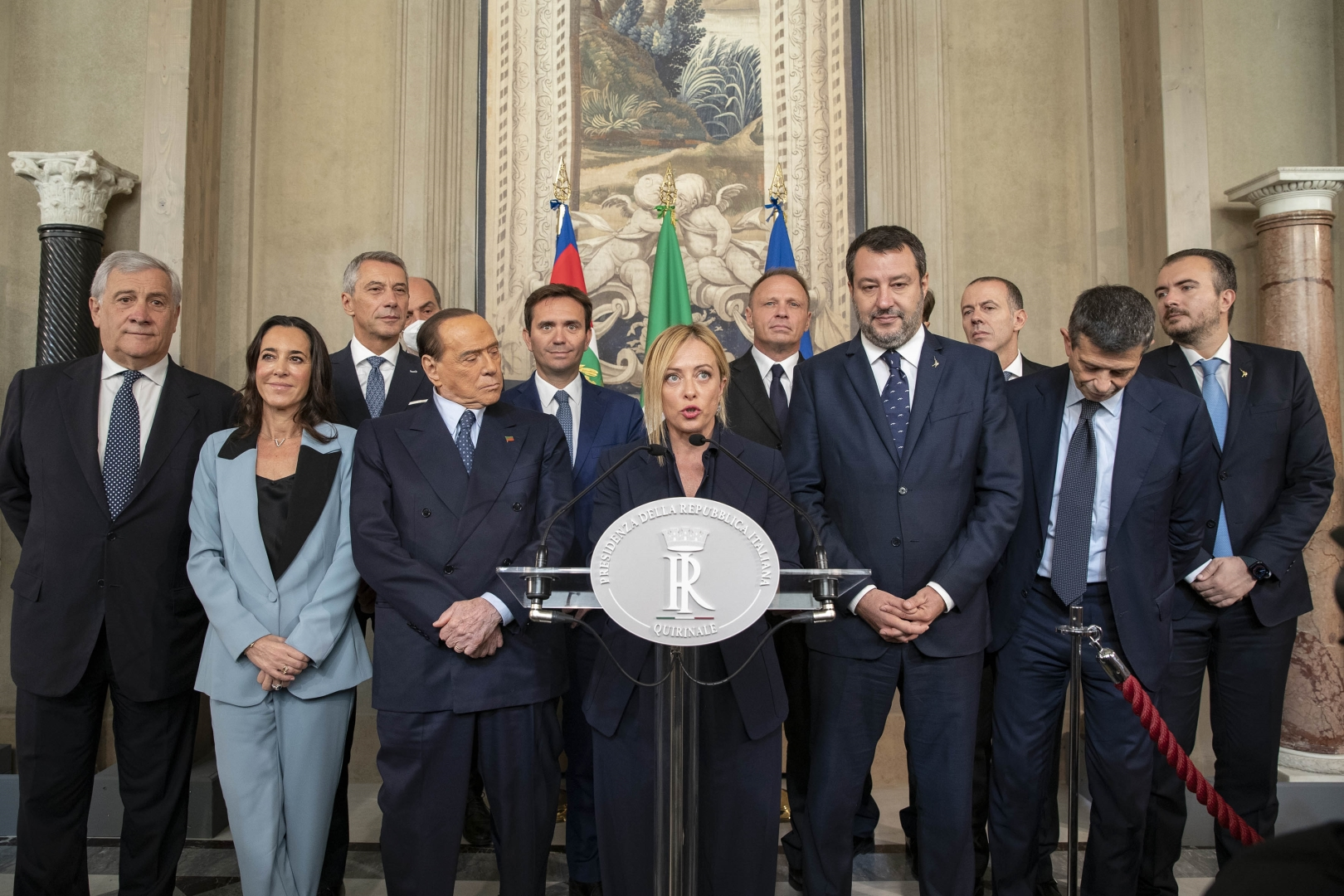
Delegation of the centre-right coalition at the Quirinal Palace

Immediately after the first meeting of the Italian Parliament's new legislature, tensions began to grow within the centre-right coalition. On 13 October, Silvio Berlusconi refused to support Ignazio La Russa, a politician with a neo-fascist background who was the Brothers of Italy (FdI) candidate to be President of the Senate of the Republic. However, La Russa succeeded in being elected by obtaining 116 votes out of 206 in the first round, thanks to the support from opposition parties to the centre-right coalition. Tensions further grew, in particular between Berlusconi and Giorgia Meloni, whom Berlusconi described as "patronising, overbearing, arrogant" and "offensive" in a series of written notes in the Senate. In the following days, after meetings between parties' leader, tensions loosened and the centre-right coalition parties reached an agreement on the formation of the new cabinet. Berlusconi also complained about the treatment that Forza Italia received, because he wanted 7 ministries and not 4 (since Lega held the Presidency of the Chamber, and FdI the Presidency of the Senate, which according to Berlusconi have always been worth 1 and 2 ministries for those who don't have them), but Meloni laughed in his face and granted him only one more ministry.

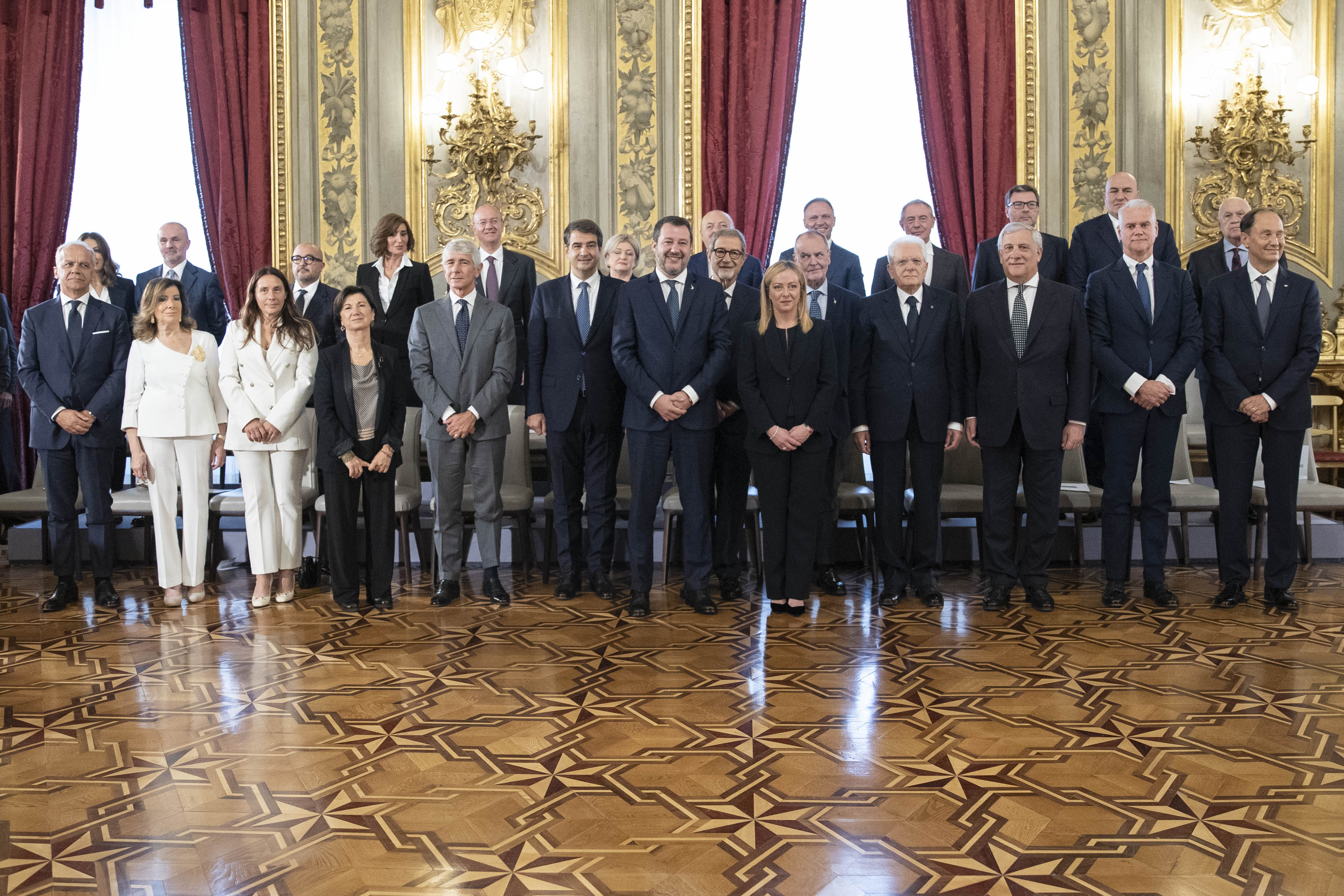
The Meloni government at the Quirinal Palace for the swearing-in ceremony

On 20 October, consultations between President Sergio Mattarella and parties officially began. On the following day, delegates from FdI, the Lega, whose member Lorenzo Fontana had been elected President of the Chamber of Deputies on 14 October), Forza Italia (FI), and the group of Civics of Italy–Us Moderates–MAIE told Mattarella they had reached an agreement to form a coalition government with Meloni as prime minister. In the afternoon, Mattarella summoned Meloni to the Quirinal Palace, asking her to form a new government. Meloni accepted the task, and on the same day assembled a cabinet, which was officially sworn in on 22 October, becoming the first woman to hold the office of Prime Minister of Italy. The government successfully won the confidence vote, held in late October, with a comfortable majority in both houses.

On 25 October, Meloni gave her first official speech as Prime Minister in front of the Chamber of Deputies, before the confidence vote on her government. During her speech, she stressed the weight of being the first woman to serve as head of the Italian government. Meloni thanked several Italian women, including Tina Anselmi, Samantha Cristoforetti, Grazia Deledda, Oriana Fallaci, Nilde Iotti, Rita Levi-Montalcini, and Maria Montessori, who she said, "with the boards of their own examples, built the ladder that today allows me to climb and break the heavy glass ceiling placed over our heads." On 31 October, the government nominated its deputy ministers and undersecretaries. Galeazzo Bignami, one of the chosen deputy ministers, caused controversy and garnered international attention as a 2005 photo of him with a Nazi armband became public.

==== Investiture vote ====
25–26 October 2022 Investiture votes for the Meloni government
House of Parliament	Vote	Parties	Votes
Chamber of Deputies (Voting: 389 of 400, Majority: 195)	Yes	FdI, Lega, FI, CdI–NM–MAIE	235 / 389
Chamber of Deputies (Voting: 389 of 400, Majority: 195)	No	PD–IDP, M5S, A–IV, AVS, +E	154 / 389
Chamber of Deputies (Voting: 389 of 400, Majority: 195)	Abstention	SVP, ScN, UV	5 / 389
Senate of the Republic (Voting: 199 of 206, Majority: 98)	Yes	FdI, Lega, FI, CdI–NM–MAIE	115 / 199
Senate of the Republic (Voting: 199 of 206, Majority: 98)	No	PD–IDP, M5S, A–IV, AVS, +E, SVP (Note: One SVP senator voted in favour, the other against.)	79 / 199
Senate of the Republic (Voting: 199 of 206, Majority: 98)	Abstention	SVP, ScN	5 / 199

=== Domestic policies ===
Meloni's government first decree law was related to the ergastolo ostativo, the prison regime that excludes the perpetrators of violent crimes, in particular those related to the mafia and terrorism, from receiving benefits in prison unless they collaborate with the justice system, which are known as collaboratori di giustizia. In 2021, the Constitutional Court of Italy held that this was unconstitutional, and this decree law was previously approved in the Chamber on 31 March 2022 but did not make it to the Senate due to the snap elections. One of the first measures implemented by the government regarded COVID-19 and concerned the complete removal of the COVID-19 vaccination certificate, known in Italy as the Green Pass; moreover, the non-vaccinated doctors were re-integrated into service. Another policy deemed of priority by the new right-wing government is raising the cash ceiling, which critics argue it favours tax evasion and unreported employment, while its proponents including Meloni reject this; a poll by Izi showed that 6 out of 10 right-wing voters agreed that such a law would favour unreported employment.

==== Decree on protests and rallies ====
On 31 October 2022, the government approved a decree providing for a penalty of up to six years of imprisonment for illegal parties and rallies. This came amid anti-fascist protests at La Sapienza University, which were subject of criticism due to the police's response, and a rally in Predappio, where Benito Mussolini is buried, to commemorate the centenary of the March on Rome that led to the takeover of Mussolini and Italian fascism of the government. Despite being officially presented as a decree against illegal rave parties, the law was applicable to any gathering over 50 people that the public authority deemed dangerous, which garnered criticism, including from jurist Vitalba Azzolini. The decree also caused protests from opposition parties and civil rights associations; according to Amnesty International, the decree "risked undermining the right to peaceful protest", while Giuseppe Conte of the Five Star Movement compared it to a police state. The law was also contested by FI, which asked for changes, including the reduction of sentences to four years, while it was mainly supported by FdI and Lega, and FdI's justice minister Carlo Nordio was reportedly upset by the law.

==== Cultured meat ban ====
In March 2023, Italy's Meloni government approved a draft bill banning the production and commercialization of cultured meat for human and animal consumption; this move, which the government said was intended to protect food heritage.

Italy became the first country to ban cultured meat in November 2023, when the government approved the bill.

==== Foreign ban on surrogacys ====
On 16 October 2024, The Senate voted 84-58 in favor of extending a ban on surrogacy to couples who go abroad to avail of the procedure.

==== Autonomy ====
On 23 January 2024, the bill about "differentiated autonomy" (which aims to give much more autonomy to Italian regions, for a maximum of 23 specific subjects) was approved in the Senate, and it was then approved by the Chamber on 19 June. The law was criticised by the opposition and by various deputies and presidents of southern Italy (both from the majority and the opposition, such as Roberto Occhiuto of Forza Italia, president of Calabria, and Vincenzo De Luca of the PD, president of Campania), accusing the government of wanting to abandon the southern regions, favoring those of the north, and on 20 July a collection of signatures began to call an abrogative referendum.

==== Immigration ====
Meloni campaigned heavily on a platform of reducing immigration, calling for a naval blockade of northern Africa, and the closure of ports, to reduce the numbers of asylum seekers traveling to Italy, although not all of these policies have been enacted.

Political analysts have characterised the government's migration policy as combining restrictive measures and deterrence with an expansion of legal migration channels. The Financial Times described the government's approach as a contrast between its public emphasis on controlling irregular migration and its need to admit foreign workers to address labour shortages. EUobserver similarly described the government's approach as combining hardline rhetoric and deterrence measures with expanded legal pathways for non-EU workers.

An early plan was to send asylum seekers to Albania, for processing. This was approved on 24 January 2024, by the Chamber of Deputies and later the Senate. However, this plan has faced several court challenges.

Meloni's government has repeatedly invoked newer and tougher laws to stem immigration including crackdowns on humanitarian boats assisting asylum seekers, creating special protection permits which prohibit arrivals from seeking asylum, using bone-density tests to establish the ages of teenage migrants, and holding asylum seekers for long periods in police stations and detention centres.

On 22 May 2024, the Government, through Minister Matteo Piantedosi and in agreement with the Slovenian and Croatian authorities, implemented a further six-month extension to the suspension of the Schengen Convention on the border with Slovenia, until 19 December; The previous five-month extension had been approved on 18 January (and would have lasted until 19 June).

The government issued over 450,000 permits to migrants between 2023 and 2025. In July 2025, it was reported that the government will issue nearly half a million or 500,000 work visas for non-EU nationals from 2026 to 2028. The quotas included allocations for workers from specified non-EU countries, particularly in Asia, Africa, and the Western Balkans.

In July 2026, following the Morocco–Spain border incident, Meloni called for Spain to be suspended from the EU's visa-free Schengen Area. Writing on X, she said that "uncontrolled illegal immigration poses a real threat to the security of Europe's borders." Sánchez rejected the criticism and argued on X that Italy had received significantly more migrants than Spain since 2021, citing approximately 478,000 undocumented migrants arriving in Italy as opposed to 234,000 in Spain.

==== Law and Order ====
On 15 June 2023, the Council of Ministers approved, on the proposal of Minister Nordio, a bill on justice (also known informally at first as the "Berlusconi reform" and then the "Nordio Bill"), which abolished the crime of abuse of office and redesigned the appeal procedures in the first instance initiated by prosecutors against acquittals, as well as the use and dissemination of wiretapping. The bill was then be approved by the Senate on 13 February 2024, and then by the Chamber of Deputies on 10 July.

On 7 August, a change was also made to the crime of Undue Allocation of Money or Movable Property, implemented io replace the abolished abuse of office, together with some minor corrections, in order to allow the promulgation of the previous "Nordio Bill", which had remained suspended until then due to some perplexities of the Presidency of the Republic.

On 18 September 2024, the Chamber of Deputies approved the "Safety Bill" (a modified version of the "safety package" previously approved by the Council of Ministers on 16 November 2023), which covered many subjects: terrorism; scams; protection of law enforcement; banning cannabis (in any form, as well as hemp-containing products); imprisonment (2–7 years) for those who illegally occupy a property; increase in penalties in case of protest (including passive resistance to orders) in prison; the need for a residence permit (for non-EU immigrants) to buy a SIM card; possible imprisonment (1 month if alone, 6 months–2 years if with more people) for those implementing road or railway blockades (even as a protest).

Minister of the Interior Matteo Piantedosi confirmed that the rule about blockades could be applied in some strike cases. The bill was heavily criticised by the oppositions, which labelled it as "liberticidal": in particular, the "anti-Salis rule" (named after Ilaria Salis, an AVS MEP accused of illegal occupation in 2008; however, there was only one identification while she was in the plant at that moment, as the ALER had never initiated investigations, nor criminal or civil cases, in 16 years) and the "anti-Gandhi rule" were criticised, the first one because it aggravated the situation of people who had no home to stay, the second one because it could also prevent peaceful protests (such as those historically led by Gandhi).

The Lega's request to evaluate the possibility of using chemical castration on those convicted of sexual violence was also accepted (this proposal was also highly criticised).

The government has also proposed, within the security bill, the expansion of the powers of the secret services (which could participate in and/or direct terrorist or subversive groups), and the obligation for universities and public research bodies (enti pubblici di ricerca) to collaborate with the secret services (DIS, AISE, AISI), including communicating private information; both of these proposals have been harshly criticised: the first because in Italy the secret services, during the Years of Lead between 1960s and 1980s, were involved in illicit activities and massacres during the Strategy of Tension, and the second because it would represent an authoritarian turn on universities, with the risk of violating the privacy and communicating the political opinions of students, professors and researchers.

On 4 April 2025, the government approved a decree-law (Decreto-Legge) that almost entirely follows the previous security bill (apart from some changes), which had been sent back to the Chamber due to the lack of financial coverage and doubts raised by the President of the Republic Sergio Mattarella, in order to speed up the approval process.

Following the entry and vandalisation of La Stampa's headquarters on 28 November 2025, the government had the thirty-year-old "Askatasuna" self-managed social center (some of whose members were part of the pro-Palestine group that attacked the newspaper) evicted and seized on 18 December, accusing it of being a source of aggression and violence, despite having been acquitted of the criminal association charge. The mayor of Turin said that the eviction took place due to the presence of 6 people who were sleeping in the building during a police search, which violated the legalisation process of the center, despite the dispatch of 300 police officers to the city before this discovery. Demonstrations in support of Askatasuna, which then turned into violent clashes with the police, occurred on 20 December 2025 and 31 January 2026; the management of the clashes was criticised due to the deployment of untrained officers and the violence used by the police against journalists, photographers, and protesters, even peaceful ones.

On 29 March 2026, Lega introduced a bill to ban anarchist associations and designate "Antifa" as "terrorist organizations", calling for "zero tolerance against accomplices of terrorists".

On 17 April 2026, a new security decree was approved, containing measures such as: a 12-hour preventive detention for "dangerous individuals" before demonstrations; a ban on access to demonstrations for individuals previously convicted of "serious crimes"; make it illegal to carry knives with blades of 5 cm or longer outside home "without a valid reason"; less chance of obtaining extenuating circumstances for drug possession; increased penalties for theft; provide an extra compensation of 615 euros for lawyers assisting migrants applying for voluntary repatriation; registration in a separate register (not that of "suspects") for those who acted in the presence of a "justifying cause"; and the fact that the State pays the legal costs, starting from the preliminary investigation phase, of police officers, armed forces or firefighters reported for acts committed on duty. The decree was criticised by the opposition and by the Consiglio Nazionale Forense for the extra payment to lawyers, the latter claiming to have never been informed of it and calling for the elimination of that part; the High Council of the Judiciary criticised the preventive detention, expressing concern about the respect for human rights.

==== Healthcare ====
Italy's healthcare system is organised in the framework of the Servizio Sanitario Nazionale, a broad public system encompassing institutions ranging from the Ministry of Health to medical service providers at the regional level. Citizens of Italy are universally eligible to the services of the SSN, receiving care for either free or low cost. During the COVID-19 pandemic, which devastated Italy, the SSN's shortcomings regarding the fragmentation and uneven administrative capacities became more evident, serving as a ground for opposition parties, such as FdI, to criticise such weaknesses. Due to the regional fragmentation, the allocation of resources is inefficient, standardises protocols are not feasible and research is hindered.

In 2024, the Meloni government formulated and enacted a new decree, proceeding towards the centralised coordination of the Italian healthcare system. The law introduced a national system for monitoring waiting lists, while also supporting the cooperation of the public and private sector in healthcare, including the practice of intramoenia. The legislation proposal also aimed to expand personnel and give certain tax cuts to healthcare workers. Moreover, the government put emphasis on the need to tackle the shortage of nurses and non-medical specialists with increased allocation of investments.

The Meloni government promised that the health fund will reach €136.5 billion in 2025 and €140 billion in 2026. Critics argue that the healthcare spending undertaken by the Prime Minister and the Minister of Health, Orazio Schillaci, was not delivered. They claim that rather a fraction of the initially announced budget was provided for the fund, while Meloni spoke of it as a record level in healthcare spending. Unsatisfied with the 2025 budget proposal, healthcare workers went on strike in November 2024. Furthermore, as the problem of long waiting lists persists, many citizens turn their backs on prescribed treatments and enraged by the situation, there is an increase in the reported aggressive acts against medical staff.

==== Labour market regulation and safety ====
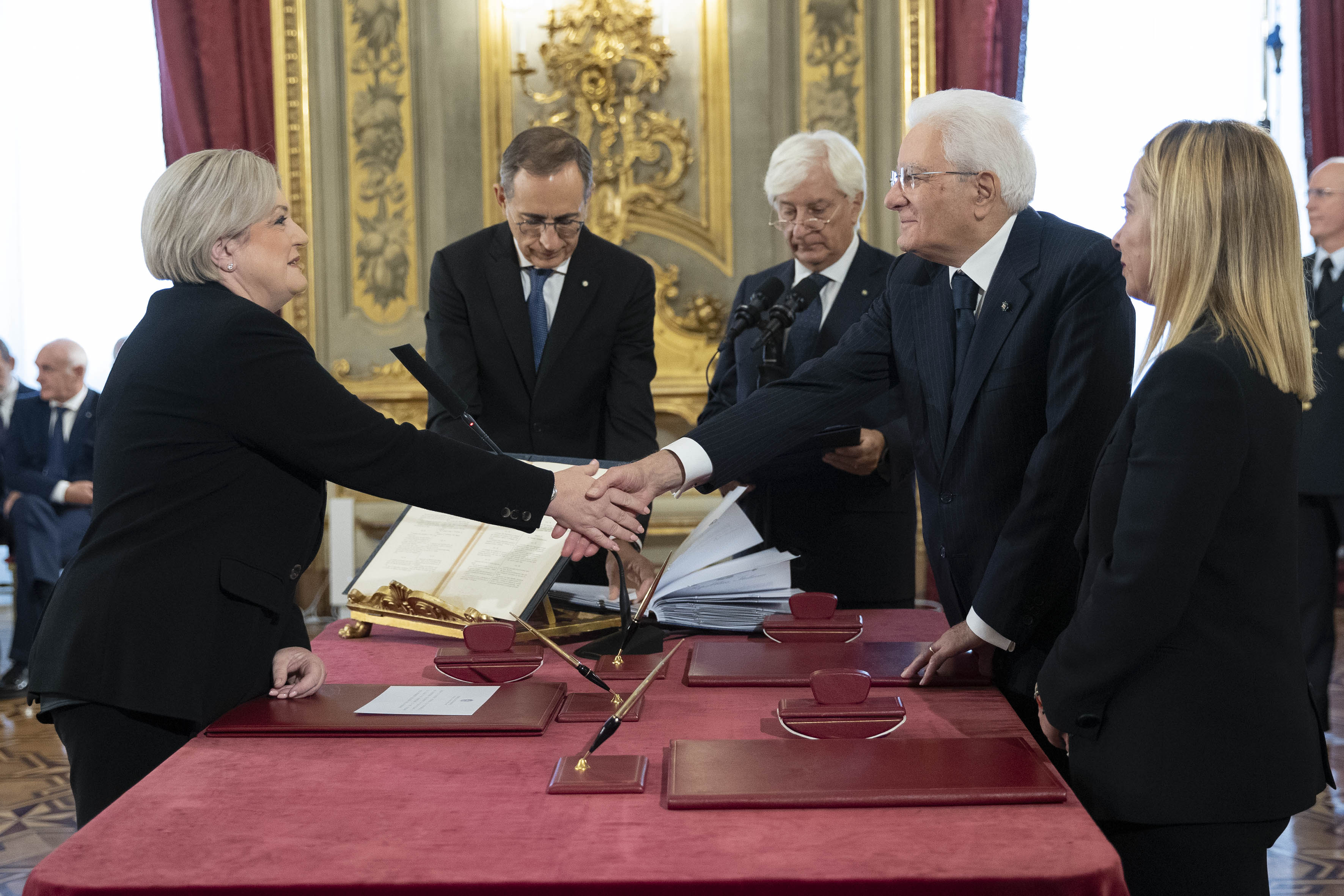
Minister of Labour Marina Elvira Calderone, who proposed the measures contained in the "Decreto Lavoro", at the swearing-in of Meloni Government in Quirinale

On 4 May 2023, on the proposal of Minister of Labour and Social Policies Marina Elvira Calderone, the government approved a decree called Decreto Lavoro (DL48/2023) introducing new measures concerning work contracts and unemployment benefits. The decree, later converted into Law n. 85 on 3 July 2023, makes substantial changes to the fixed term contract laws, allowing temporary employment agreements longer than 12 months only in specific conditions such as replacements of other workers or needs required by collective bargaining. It also simplified employers' disclosure requirements and introduced benefits for hiring people under 30, specifically providing a tax incentive equal to 60% of the gross monthly remuneration for a period of 12 months for employers who hire young people registered in the Garanzia giovani program (article 27), and for hiring Inclusion Allowance (Assegno di Inclusione; ADI) beneficiaries, for which a total exemption from social security contributions (up to €8,000 annually) is guaranteed (Article 10).

Finally, the decree strengthened health and safety regulations (Article 14), revising Italy's Consolidated Act on Health and Safety in the Workplace (D.Lgs. 81/2008) and, specifically under Article 18, extended compulsory INAIL insurance coverage to students and teaching staff involved in vocational training and PCTO (school-work alternation programs).

The "Decreto Lavoro" sparked significant debate among political parties, trade unions, and economic institutions. The major Italian trade unions (CGIL and UIL, historically hostile against right-wing governments) and the opposition parties (in particular PD and M5S) criticised the relaxation of rules on fixed-term contracts, claiming that it would increase job insecurity (precariato) without solving structural employment issues. On the other hand, business associations such as Confindustria welcomed the greater flexibility and the reduction of the tax wedge, although they considered the cuts insufficient to fully relaunch competitiveness in economy.

==== Welfare reform ====
The decree also reformed the social safety net, replacing the old Reddito di Cittadinanza with two new instruments of poverty alleviation and unemployment support: the Inclusion Allowance (Assegno di Inclusione) and the Support for Training and Work (Supporto per la Formazione e il Lavoro; SFL). ADI, effective since 1 January 2024, is reserved for households containing members who are minors, persons with disabilities, individuals over the age of 60, or those in disadvantaged conditions certified by public social services. Eligibility is subject to a residency requirement of five years (reduced from the ten years required for the Reddito di Cittadinanza) and an equivalent economic situation indicator (ISEE) threshold of €9,360. The other new income support (SFL) became operational on 1 September 2023 and targets "employable" individuals between the ages of 18 and 59 who do not qualify for the Inclusion Allowance and have an ISEE not exceeding €6,000. Unlike the household-based ADI, the SFL is a personal benefit providing €350 per month for a maximum non-renewable duration of 12 months. The payment is strictly conditional on the beneficiary's active participation in training, qualification, or labour activation programs managed through the new Information System for Social and Work Inclusion (Sistema Informatico per l'Inclusione Sociale e Lavorativa, SIISL).

The Bank of Italy provided a technical analysis of the transition from the Reddito di Cittadinanza to the new ADI/SFL system. In a hearing before the Parliament the Bank noted that while the reform strengthens incentives to work, the stricter eligibility criteria for the Inclusion Allowance could leave a significant portion of households previously covered by the Reddito di Cittadinanza without support, particularly those who are poor but theoretically "employable".

==== 2026 constitutional referendum ====
In March 2026, Meloni's government held a constitutional referendum where voters were asked whether they approved a constitutional law, often called the "Nordio Reform" (Riforma Nordio) after Carlo Nordio (the Minister of Justice), that would amend the Italian Constitution in various aspects, most notably by proposing the constitutional separation of career paths between judges and public prosecutors, the splitting of the High Council of the Judiciary (CSM) into two distinct bodies, and the selection of members by sortition rather than traditional election, as well as the establishment of a High Disciplinary Court to oversee disciplinary proceedings. The government-initiated constitutional bill was approved by the Senate of the Republic on 30 October 2025. Since it did not reach the qualified two-thirds majority in each chamber of Italian Parliament during the parliamentary approval process, pursuant to Article 138 of the Italian Constitution, the necessary signatures were collected to request a confirmatory constitutional referendum. A quorum is not required for the referendum to be valid, and the Nordio law submitted to the referendum would be promulgated if confirmed by a majority of valid votes. Meloni's government supported and campaigned in favour of its passing. However, the victory of the "No" side was widely seen as a blow to her government and a boost to opposition parties ahead of the 2027 general election.

==== Education and school ====
On 27 October 2023, the Senate approved, through the "Caivano Decree" (which was subsequently confirmed by the Chamber of Deputies on 7 November), stricter penalties for parents who don't send their children to school, replacing a €30 fine: up to two years of imprisonment for those who do not enroll their children, and up to one year for cases of unexcused absences. In addition to this, an extra 32 million euros has been approved for schools in southern Italy, to increase the number of teachers.

On 4 June 2026, the Senate finally approved a law proposed by the Minister of Education and Merit Valditara, which requires informed consent from parents to teach affective-sexual education in schools for minors; sex education, specifically, is only allowed in secondary school. The minister commented that they were protecting "children from the confusion of gender propaganda" and giving "parents a voice on issues of gender identity for their minor adolescent children".

The government proposed to put a limit on foreign students in school classes, specifically that they cannot exceed 30% (also introduced by a 2010 circular, which was waived due to the schools' geographical location, particularly in neighborhoods with high concentrations of migrants). This concerns 4,223 schools, according to ministerial data from 2022–2023, that is ~7.9% of the total (even though 65.2% of them were born in Italy), but Valditara talked about 34,000 schools. Children from the rest of the EU and second-generation migrants with a good command of the Italian language would be exempt from this rule, and, following some objections from the President of the Republic and the principals, in case the relocation of the students is not possible there will be language improvement courses. According to the Ministry of Education, there are fewer than a thousand classes in which more than 20% of the students do not speak Italian correctly.

The government has also proposed banning the use of the burqa and niqab in schools, which happens with 500 to 600 female students in Italy. A law that prohibits people from appearing in public with their faces covered exists since 1975, but excludes "justified reasons", for example religious ones. However, the bill written by the government does not explicitly mention burqa and niqab, referring more generally to a covered face and citing helmets as an example. The NGO "Save the Children" has criticized both the cap on the percentage of foreign students, arguing that it risks ignoring the concentration of population in the suburbs and increasing stigmatization, and the ban on the burqa and niqab, which would risk appearing as an attack against a specific religious identity.

==== Electoral law ====
On 16 July 2026, the Chamber approved the "Stabilicum", a new electoral law, replacing the 2017 one: it is based on proportional representation with a majority bonus for the coalition that reaches 42% or more, obtaining 70 seats in the Chamber of Representatives (maximum 220) and 35 in the Senate (maximum 113); the first coalition party that falls below the 3% threshold will still secure seats in parliament. The law mandates the designation of the candidate for Prime Minister at the time the party symbol and platform are filed; it confirms the possibility for students and workers living away from home to vote; and it reduces the number of constituencies representing Italians abroad, cutting them from four to two in the Chamber of Deputies and from two to one in the Senate. The possibility of a runoff (triggered if both coalitions surpassed a certain threshold) was also considered, but amendments regarding this were not approved.

Initially, the representatives could not be directly chosen, because the necessary majority to approve the specific amendment was not reached, thanks to ~50 franchi tiratori (at least 10 from FdI, 10 from Lega and 20 from FI) during the secret ballot, but subsequently the measure was approved by the Senate, with fixed lead candidates, on 20 September 2026, and by the Chamber on 8 October 2026, finally approving the law.

Furthermore, the minimum number of signatures required per constituency for those not already sitting in Parliament has been raised from 1,500 to 6,000, while an exemption remains for those with two parliamentary groups, or at least one group formed by 31 December 2025.

Opposition parties have criticised the electoral law for the absence of gender quotas for lead candidates and have denounced the majority bonus, comparing the Stabilicum to the 1953 Legge truffa ("Scam law") and nicknaming the new law "Melonellum". The increase of minimum number of signatures was criticised by minor parties, but also by major parties already in parliament; this was subsequently bypassed by the government itself, with FdI "lending" two deputies to South calls North and one senator to Italy Tomorrow, by the Five Star Movement, which lended a senator to Civic Project Italy-Avanti PSI, and by the Democratic Party, which lended a senator to the Communist Refoundation Party.

==== Italian diaspora ====
Meloni's government enacted a decree on 28 March 2025, which significantly restricted Italian citizenship by descent, affecting millions of Italian descendants. Citizenship claims are now restricted to applicants who have a parent or grandparent born in Italy who held Italian citizenship at birth. Great-grandchildren and more distant descendants no longer qualify automatically.

==== Defense ====
In 2025, Giorgia Meloni agreed to an increase in military spending as requested by NATO, with the target rising from 2% to 5% by 2035, that is 145 billion euros in that year, of which 3.5% (100 billion) will be for military spending, and 1.5% for national security (cybersecurity, critical infrastructure, power plants, telecommunications networks, and infrastructure for military mobility). According to NATO estimates and criteria, Italy spent 1.54% of its GDP on defense in 2024, 2.01% in 2025 (approximately 42 billion euros), and at least 2.1% in 2026 (2.8% expected for the same year), with the goal of reaching 3.2% by 2028 (an additional 19 billion euros in 2027–2028).

=== Foreign policy ===
==== European Union ====
While Giorgia Meloni and Antonio Tajani expressed pro-European positions, Meloni has also been described as anti-federalist (she herself wants a confederal Europe) and nationalist; this claim has been supported also by other European leaders such as Victor Orban, who said he and Meloni are "patriots" and that they want less power for the EU. Matteo Salvini has been critical of the European Union in many ways, blaming the EU economic policies and bureaucracy instead of Trump's tariffs, disagreeing with Tajani on the formation of a European army, mocking French president Emmanuel Macron, and stating that he does not want a "European superstate".

The entire government has been more united on some criticisms of the EU, such as the European Green Deal and the European Commission against Racism and Intolerance, which accused Italian police of racial profiling, with particular regard to Roma people and people of African origin.

==== US, Trump, and NATO ====
Meloni and her government have been described as Atlanticists, something that she herself also claims, and that they worked to keep Europe and the United States united. This pro-US position was also supported by Forza Italia and by the foreign minister Tajani. Lega's leader, Matteo Salvini, has taken a pro-Trump position, celebrating his victory in the 2024 presidential election; wanting to imitate him in leaving the WHO; supporting his work in the Gaza War; suggesting that he should receive the Nobel Peace Prize (something supported also by Meloni if he were to bring peace); and defending the US sanctions, also considering them an opportunity for Italy.

After Trump's statements about wanting Greenland, Meloni criticised the threat of tariffs on European countries that do not agree with the will of the USA, adding that she does not believe the US will attack the island and that there is a need for a strong NATO presence in the Arctic, and that she does not exclude an Italian presence on Greenland, but that it should be discussed with NATO. Salvini welcomed Trump's threat of a 200% tariff on French wines, saying it would be good for Italian wines. Claudio Borghi, a Lega's senator, also expressed his appreciation for asymmetric tariffs, including those on wine, reiterating that they represent an opportunity; Borghi also stated that Greenland's utility "right now is only cod fishing" and that it can be left to Trump, and that he believes that Trump is interested in the island only because "he sees it big on the map".

The relationship between Meloni and Trump deteriorated when the US president said in a phone call that she begged him for a photo together during a G7 summit in France, and that he could have refused, but he felt sorry for her. Meloni denied that this had happened, calling it "completely made up", and said she did not understand why he behaves that way toward his allies while being far more accommodating to the leadership of his enemies. Trump also said that Meloni was a supporter of his but that he did not want her "as a fan" because neither she nor NATO helped "with the Strait issue", and that she was doing very poorly in the polls. The president's statements were also condemned by Deputy Prime Ministers Salvini and Tajani (who also cancelled a visit to the US scheduled for 21 and 22 June), while nevertheless emphasising the need for good relations between the United States and Italy.

Following the Democrats' victory in the 2026 midterm elections, Tajani stated that the government has never been "Trumpian", and that Meloni is not MAGA.

==== Russia and Ukraine ====
Giorgia Meloni criticised Russian aggression and supported the Ukrainian resistance, even with weapons, but always opposed the deployment of Italian troops. While Tajani has fully supported this strategy, the former leader of Forza Italia, Silvio Berlusconi, had been criticised (also by the prime minister) for his closeness to Putin even during the war, despite later retracting various statements on him. Matteo Salvini and the Lega, on the contrary, have always been skeptical on support for Ukraine, criticising the sending of money and weapons. Salvini also accepted Putin's victory in 2024 Russian presidential elections, even if both the United States and the European Union said that the elections were neither free nor fair.

==== Israel and Palestine ====
The Italian government has declared its support for a two-state solution between Israel and Palestine, and criticised human rights violations and the establishment of new settlements in the West Bank, but it also criticised the recognition of the state of Palestine by other European countries, stating instead that this can only happen when all the hostages will be freed and Hamas will no longer be in control of Gaza, and with a clear definition of the borders.

The government criticised the Global Sumud Flotilla, calling it irresponsible, and stating that "there is no need to risk one's safety by entering a war zone to deliver aid to Gaza that the Italian government could have delivered in a few hours". Giorgia Meloni also stated that Italian activists' aim wasn't helping the people of Gaza, but attacking the Italian government. The government then sent two frigates to protect the Italian citizens part of the Flotilla, but withdrew them 150 miles away from Gaza. Questioned about the blockade of the Gaza Strip imposed by Israel, Tajani said that he believed it to be a violation of law, but that "what international law says is valid only up to a certain point".

While Meloni has not openly criticised or supported the International Criminal Court's arrest warrant against Benjamin Netanyahu, she stated that there can be no equivalence between "the responsibilities of the State of Israel and the terrorist organization Hamas", Foreign Minister Tajani said they will evaluate what to do, the president of Forza Italia's senators Maurizio Gasparri took a stand against the sentence, the Minister of Defense Guido Crosetto said he disapproved the sentence but that it must be applied, and Matteo Salvini called it an "absurd request" and a "pro-Islamic political sentence", later stating that Netanyahu would be welcome and that "the war criminals are others". Despite Netanyahu's several flights over Italy, the government has never called for his arrest, a move criticised by the opposition and Amnesty International.

Antonio Tajani, Guido Crosetto and Giorgia Meloni said that the Government suspended new arms shipments to Israel after 7 October 2023, but existing contracts remained active.

==== Venezuela ====
The Italian government has not recognised Nicolás Maduro as president of Venezuela, following electoral fraud in the 2024 elections.

After the United States strikes on Venezuela and the capture of Nicolás Maduro, Tajani said that Italy supports Venezuelan people, and the government stated that military actions are not the way to end "totalitarian regimes", but that it considers a defensive intervention "against hybrid attacks on its own security" legitimate, as in the case of "state entities that support and promote drug trafficking".

==== Iran ====
After the start of the 2026 Iran-US War, Deputy Prime Minister Matteo Salvini stated that "whoever intervened in Iran did the right thing", because "diplomacy is always better" but "with certain people it must be accompanied by something else", also saying that there are "tens of nostalgic communists who even manage to defend the criminal Ayatollah", while remaining opposed to sending troops. Salvini stated that the intervention was justified by the construction of atomic bombs and by the fact that Iran is "a bloodthirsty regime" that "wants to wipe out Western countries", while Foreign Minister Tajani said that Iran's rigidity in negotiations and the refusal to give up the atomic bomb had provoked the US and Israeli reaction.

Meloni stated that she neither supports nor condemns the military action in Iran, that she does not have "the elements to take a position", and that "except for the Spanish Prime Minister, no one else has condemned the initiative".

== Criticism ==
=== Human rights ===
On 17 December 2025, Amnesty International published a sixty-page analysis named Il governo Meloni al giro di boa. The report claims that after 3 years [of Meloni's Government] in Italy there has been a sharp setback in the protection of human rights, through laws and policies that "restrained civic spaces, eroded freedoms of expression and association, and targeted solidarity organizations and marginalized identities". In particular, Amnesty International criticised the Decreto Sicurezza, the excessive use of security forces, the hostility towards the national and international judiciary, the release of Usāma al-Maṣrī Nağīm, the CPRs in Albania, and the blocking and postponement of the vote for the introduction of the principle of consent in the crime of rape.

The NGO Civil Liberties Union for Europe claims that Italy (along with Bulgaria, Croatia, Slovakia, and Hungary) "consistently and intentionally" erode the rule of law, both in its 2025 (which also included Romania) and 2026 reports, in particular due to criminalising road blockades and other forms of dissent, strengthening guarantees for police, attempts to control the judiciary, critical or hostile political discourse towards the judiciary and human rights institutions, attacks on journalists, government interference in public service media, and the al-Maṣrī case. In 2025, the European Civic Forum also described the Decreto Sicurezza as "a serious threat to democracy amid a systemic deterioration of the rule of law".

Regarding the 2026 security decree, the High Council of the Judiciary criticised the preventive detention, stating that it leaves "excessively discretionary margins to the police officer, with the concrete risk of possible drifts towards a prevention model based on presumptions of abstract dangerousness rather than on actual behaviours, and, above all, of a possible friction of the provision (...) with the international obligations of respect for human rights to which Italy is bound". According to the CSM, personal freedoms would be limited, and therefore "specific obligations (currently absent) should be introduced to record and justify the actions of the judicial police", and it also does not specify what investigations the police must carry out.

=== Austerity ===
The Meloni government has been accused of doing austerity policies, in particular with the 2026 budget law, which the government and the Minister of Economy Giorgetti deny. The main criticisms concerned the limited expenditure of the law (18.7 billion, later increased to 22 billion thanks to the support for businesses) in order to exit the EU infringement procedure for excessive deficits, healthcare and welfare, the non-payment of arrears to workers in case of compliance with the standards of certain collective agreements (amendment later rejected by the government itself), the increase in fuel taxes (because Meloni had proposed eliminating excises on petrol), and specific increases in the retirement age, which was also opposed by the Lega (and therefore wasn't approved).

=== Migration policy ===
During her 2022 election campaign, Meloni pledged to implement a total naval blockade in the Mediterranean to halt unauthorised migration. Human rights and maritime commentators criticised this proposal as an unfeasible political slogan that would violate international law and compromise life-saving rescue operations. However, the administration faced criticism from portions of its right-wing electorate after irregular arrivals reached historic highs in 2023. Her government subsequently approved the Decreto Flussi ('Flows Decree'). This legislation expanded legal immigration quotas to permit nearly 452,000 non-EU migrant workers into Italy between 2023 and 2025 to mitigate domestic labour shortages.

The expansion of legal labour migration drew criticism from some politicians on the right, who argued that it contradicted Meloni's campaign emphasis on restricting immigration. They argued that she favoured corporate interests over domestic birth rates and family incentives. This internal friction became apparent in October 2023, when the Florentine regional transport company Autolinee Toscane began to actively recruit migrant workers. Francesco Torselli, the regional leader of Meloni's Brothers of Italy party in Tuscany, publicly condemned the initiative. On Instagram, he questioned the necessity of wage increases for local drivers when employers could instead hire immigrants for lower pay.

Political and media analysts characterised the government's approach as a political "sleight of hand". They argued that high-profile rhetoric on irregular arrivals serves to distract the public from the large-scale admission of legal foreign laborers. Commentators noted that while this economic pragmatism remains largely unpublicised, voters are primarily presented with enforcement measures. These measures generate a political narrative but do not yield substantial reductions in overall immigration volumes.

=== Israel and International Law ===
Regarding the Global Sumud Flottilla's travel to Gaza, questioned about the blockade of the Gaza Strip imposed by Israel, Tajani said that he believed it to be a violation of law, but that "what international law says is valid only up to a certain point". This statement was strongly criticised by the president of the Italian Society of International Law and European Union Law himself, who said he felt deeply embarrassed while hearing that sentence, which was "unacceptable" because it was in open conflict with the constitution and had not been made in an official statement or document.

== Party breakdown ==
=== Beginning of term ===
==== Ministers ====
- Brothers of Italy
10
- League
5
- Forza Italia
5
- Independents
5

==== Ministers and other members ====
- Brothers of Italy (FdI): prime minister, 9 ministers, 4 deputy ministers, 14 undersecretaries
- Lega: 5 ministers, 2 deputy ministers, 9 undersecretaries
- Forza Italia (FI): 5 ministers, 2 deputy ministers, 6 undersecretaries
- Independents: 5 ministers, 1 undersecretary
- Us Moderates (NM): 1 undersecretary
- Renaissance (Rin): 1 undersecretary

=== Current ===
==== Ministers ====
- Brothers of Italy
10
- League
5
- Forza Italia
5
- Independents
5

==== Ministers and other members ====
- Brothers of Italy (FdI): prime minister, 9 ministers, 3 deputy ministers, 14 undersecretaries
- League (Lega): 5 ministers, 2 deputy ministers, 9 undersecretaries
- Forza Italia (FI): 5 ministers, 2 deputy ministers, 7 undersecretaries
- Independents: 5 ministers, 2 undersecretaries
- Us Moderates (NM): 1 undersecretary

== Geographical breakdown ==
A choropleth map showing the number of ministers from each region of Italy

=== Beginning of term ===
- Northern Italy: 15 ministers
  - Lombardy: 5 ministers
  - Piedmont: 3 ministers
  - Veneto: 3 ministers
  - Emilia-Romagna: 2 ministers
  - Friuli-Venezia Giulia: 1 minister
  - Liguria: 1 minister
- Central Italy: 5 ministers (including PM)
  - Lazio: 5 ministers (including PM)
- Southern and insular Italy: 5 ministers
  - Campania: 2 ministers
  - Apulia: 1 minister
  - Sardinia: 1 minister
  - Sicily: 1 minister

=== Current ===
- Northern Italy: 16 ministers
  - Lombardy: 5 ministers
  - Veneto: 4 ministers
  - Emilia-Romagna: 3 ministers
  - Piedmont: 2 ministers
  - Friuli-Venezia Giulia: 1 minister
  - Liguria: 1 minister
- Central Italy: 6 ministers (including PM)
  - Lazio: 6 ministers (including PM)
- Southern and insular Italy: 3 ministers
  - Campania: 1 minister
  - Sardinia: 1 minister
  - Sicily: 1 minister

== Council of Ministers ==
Office	Name	Party	Term
Prime Minister	Giorgia Meloni	Brothers of Italy	2022–present
Deputy Prime Ministers	Matteo Salvini	League	2022–present
Deputy Prime Ministers	Antonio Tajani	Forza Italia	2022–present
Minister of Foreign Affairs and International Cooperation	Antonio Tajani	Forza Italia	2022–present
Minister of the Interior	Matteo Piantedosi	Independent	2022–present
Minister of Justice	Carlo Nordio	Brothers of Italy	2022–present
Minister of Defence	Guido Crosetto	Brothers of Italy	2022–present
Minister of Economy and Finance	Giancarlo Giorgetti	League	2022–present
Minister of Business and Made in Italy	Adolfo Urso	Brothers of Italy	2022–present
Minister of Agriculture, Food Sovereignty and Forests	Francesco Lollobrigida	Brothers of Italy	2022–present
Minister of the Environment and Energy Security	Gilberto Pichetto Fratin	Forza Italia	2022–present
Minister of Infrastructure and Transport	Matteo Salvini	League	2022–present
Minister of Labour and Social Policies	Marina Calderone	Independent	2022–present
Minister of Education and Merit	Giuseppe Valditara	League	2022–present
Minister of University and Research	Anna Maria Bernini	Forza Italia	2022–present
Minister of Culture	Gennaro Sangiuliano	Independent	2022–2024
Minister of Culture	Alessandro Giuli	Independent	2024–present
Minister of Health	Orazio Schillaci	Independent	2022–present
Minister of Tourism	Daniela Santanchè	Brothers of Italy	2022–2026
Minister of Tourism	Giorgia Meloni (acting)	Brothers of Italy	2026
Minister of Tourism	Gianmarco Mazzi	Brothers of Italy	2026–present
Minister for Relations with Parliament	Luca Ciriani	Brothers of Italy	2022–present
Minister for Public Administration	Paolo Zangrillo	Forza Italia	2022–present
Minister for Regional Affairs and Autonomies	Roberto Calderoli	League	2022–present
Minister for Civil Protection and Maritime Policies	Nello Musumeci	Brothers of Italy	2022–present
Minister for European Affairs, Southern Italy, Cohesion Policy and the NRRP	Raffaele Fitto	Brothers of Italy	2022–2024
Minister for European Affairs, Southern Italy, Cohesion Policy and the NRRP	Tommaso Foti	Brothers of Italy	2024–present
Minister for Sport and Youth	Andrea Abodi	Independent	2022–present
Minister for Family, Birth Rate and Equal Opportunities	Eugenia Roccella	Brothers of Italy	2022–present
Minister for Disabilities	Alessandra Locatelli	League	2022–present
Minister for Institutional Reforms and Regulatory Simplification	Elisabetta Casellati	Forza Italia	2022–present
Secretary of the Council of Ministers	Alfredo Mantovano	Independent	2022–present

== Composition ==
Office	Portrait	Name	Term of office	Party
Prime Minister		Giorgia Meloni	22 October 2022 – present	Brothers of Italy
Prime Minister	Undersecretaries: Alfredo Mantovano (Ind.) – Delegated to the Authority for the Security of the Republic; Alessio Butti (FdI) – Delegated to Technological Innovation; Giovanbattista Fazzolari (FdI) – Delegated to the Implementation of the Government Program; Alberto Barachini (FI) – Delegated to Information and Publishing; Alessandro Morelli (Lega) – Delegated to the Coordination of Economic Policy; Luigi Sbarra (Ind.) – Delegated to the South (since 12 June 2025)			
Deputy Prime Minister		Matteo Salvini	22 October 2022 – present	League
Deputy Prime Minister		Antonio Tajani	22 October 2022 – present	Forza Italia
Minister of Foreign Affairs and International Cooperation		Antonio Tajani	22 October 2022 – present	Forza Italia
Minister of Foreign Affairs and International Cooperation	Deputy Minister: Edmondo Cirielli (FdI); Undersecretaries: Giorgio Silli (NM, later FI) (until 17 February 2026); Maria Tripodi (FI); Massimo Dell'Utri (NM) (since 22 April 2026)			
Minister of the Interior		Matteo Piantedosi	22 October 2022 – present	Independent (close to Lega)
Minister of the Interior	Undersecretaries: Wanda Ferro (FdI); Nicola Molteni (Lega); Emanuele Prisco (FdI)			
Minister of Justice		Carlo Nordio	22 October 2022 – present	Brothers of Italy
Minister of Justice	Deputy Minister: Francesco Paolo Sisto (FI); Undersecretaries: Andrea Delmastro (FdI) (until 24 March 2026); Andrea Ostellari (Lega); Alberto Balboni (FdI) (since 22 April 2026)			
Minister of Defence		Guido Crosetto	22 October 2022 – present	Brothers of Italy
Minister of Defence	Undersecretaries: Matteo Perego (FI); Isabella Rauti (FdI)			
Minister of Economy and Finance		Giancarlo Giorgetti	22 October 2022 – present	League
Minister of Economy and Finance	Deputy Minister: Maurizio Leo (FdI); Undersecretaries: Lucia Albano (FdI); Federico Freni (Lega); Sandra Savino (FI)			
Minister of Business and Made in Italy		Adolfo Urso	22 October 2022 – present	Brothers of Italy
Minister of Business and Made in Italy	Deputy Minister: Valentino Valentini (FI); Undersecretaries: Fausta Bergamotto (FdI); Massimo Bitonci (Lega) (until 13 January 2026); Mara Bizzotto (Lega) (since 22 April 2026)			
Minister of Agriculture, Food Sovereignty and Forests		Francesco Lollobrigida	22 October 2022 – present	Brothers of Italy
Minister of Agriculture, Food Sovereignty and Forests	Undersecretaries: Luigi D'Eramo (Lega); Patrizio La Pietra (FdI)			
Minister for the Environment and Energy Security		Gilberto Pichetto Fratin	22 October 2022 – present	Forza Italia
Minister for the Environment and Energy Security	Deputy Minister: Vannia Gava (Lega); Undersecretary: Claudio Barbaro (FdI)			
Minister of Infrastructure and Transport		Matteo Salvini	22 October 2022 – present	League
Minister of Infrastructure and Transport	Deputy Minister: Galeazzo Bignami (FdI) (until 4 December 2024); Edoardo Rixi (Lega); Undersecretaries: Tullio Ferrante (FI); Antonio Iannone (FdI) (since 31 March 2025)			
Minister of Labour and Social Policies		Marina Elvira Calderone	22 October 2022 – present	Independent
Minister of Labour and Social Policies	Deputy Minister: Maria Teresa Bellucci (FdI); Undersecretary: Claudio Durigon (Lega)			
Minister of Education and Merit		Giuseppe Valditara	22 October 2022 – present	League
Minister of Education and Merit	Undersecretary: Paola Frassinetti (FdI)			
Minister of University and Research		Anna Maria Bernini	22 October 2022 – present	Forza Italia
Minister of University and Research	Undersecretary: Augusta Montaruli (FdI) (until 24 February 2023)			
Minister of Culture		Gennaro Sangiuliano	22 October 2022 – 6 September 2024 (Note: Sangiuliano resigned following a scandal involving Maria Rosaria Boccia, a woman later discovered to be his lover, who the minister tried to hire as a consultant and had free access to secret documents without permission.)	Independent (close to FdI)
Minister of Culture		Alessandro Giuli	6 September 2024 – present	Independent (close to FdI)
Minister of Culture	Undersecretaries: Lucia Borgonzoni (Lega); Gianmarco Mazzi (FdI) (until 3 April 2026); Vittorio Sgarbi (Rin) (until 9 February 2024); Giampiero Cannella (FdI) (since 22 April 2026)			
Minister of Health		Orazio Schillaci	22 October 2022 – present	Independent
Minister of Health	Undersecretaries: Marcello Gemmato (FdI)			
Minister of Tourism		Daniela Santanchè	22 October 2022 – 26 March 2026 (Note: After the defeat in the 2026 constitutional referendum, Santanchè resigned under pressure from Meloni due to her legal issues involving false accounting and fraud.)	Brothers of Italy
Minister of Tourism		Giorgia Meloni; Acting	26 March 2026 – 3 April 2026	Brothers of Italy
Minister of Tourism		Gianmarco Mazzi	3 April 2026 – present	Brothers of Italy
Minister for Relations with Parliament (without portfolio)		Luca Ciriani	22 October 2022 – present	Brothers of Italy
Minister for Relations with Parliament (without portfolio)	Undersecretary: Giuseppina Castiello (Lega); Matilde Siracusano (FI); Paolo Barelli (FI) (since 22 April 2026)			
Minister for Public Administration (without portfolio)		Paolo Zangrillo	22 October 2022 – present	Forza Italia
Minister for Regional Affairs and Autonomies (without portfolio)		Roberto Calderoli	22 October 2022 – present	League
Minister for Civil Protection and Maritime Policies (without portfolio)		Nello Musumeci	22 October 2022 – present	Brothers of Italy
Minister for European Affairs, Southern Italy, Cohesion Policy and the NRRP (Note: Foti served only as Minister of European Affairs, Cohesion Policies and NRRP, because Prime Minister Meloni kept for herself the Policies for the South until 12 June 2025, when she appointed Luigi Sbarra as Undersecretary delegated to the South.) (without portfolio)		Raffaele Fitto	22 October 2022 – 30 November 2024 (Note: Fitto resigned in order to become European Commissioner for Cohesion and Reforms in the Second Von der Leyen Commission.)	Brothers of Italy
Minister for European Affairs, Southern Italy, Cohesion Policy and the NRRP (without portfolio)		Tommaso Foti	2 December 2024 – present	Brothers of Italy
Minister for Sport and Youth (without portfolio)		Andrea Abodi	22 October 2022 – present	Independent
Minister for Family, Birth Rate and Equal Opportunities (without portfolio)		Eugenia Roccella	22 October 2022 – present	Brothers of Italy
Minister for Disabilities (without portfolio)		Alessandra Locatelli	22 October 2022 – present	League
Minister for Institutional Reforms and Regulatory Simplification (without portfolio)		Elisabetta Casellati	22 October 2022 – present	Forza Italia
Secretary of the Council of Ministers		Alfredo Mantovano	22 October 2022 – present	Independent (close to FdI)
