= Undersecretary (Italy) =

The Undersecretary of State (Italian: Sottosegretario di Stato), in the Italian political system, is a member of the Government of Italy with the function of assisting the minister and carrying out the tasks that have been delegated to them by the minister. The undersecretary falls into the second category of the order of offices of the Italian Republic.

== History ==
The office of Undersecretary of State was established in the Kingdom of Italy by Law No. 5195 of 12 February 1888 (the so-called "Crispi reform), replacing the Secretary General. Although it is not expressly provided for by the 1948 Constitution, the office has been appointed in all republican governments. It is regulated by Article 10 of Law No. 400 of 23 August 1988 (Regulation of Government Activity and the Organization of the Presidency of the Council of Ministers).

Undersecretaries of State are appointed by decree of the President of the Republic, upon proposal of the President of the Council of Ministers, in agreement with the minister whom the undersecretary is called to assist, after consultation with the Council of Ministers. Before assuming office, they take an oath before the President of the Council.

Without prejudice to the political responsibility and policy-making powers of ministers, no more than ten undersecretaries may be granted the title of Deputy Minister if they are entrusted with delegated powers relating to areas or projects falling within the competence of one or more departmental structures or several directorates general. In this case, the delegation, conferred by the competent minister, is approved by the Council of Ministers upon proposal of the President of the Council. Law No. 244 of 24 December 2007 (the 2008 Finance Act) provides in Article 1, paragraph 376, that, starting from the 16th legislature, the total number of members of the Government, including ministers without portfolio, deputy ministers, and undersecretaries of state, may not exceed 65. However, as this is an ordinary statute and not a constitutional provision, it may always be amended by another law or an act having the force of law.

Undersecretaries of State may be chosen from among members of Parliament, as is usually the case, or from outside it. After appointment, they may continue to sit in either chamber (or be elected to one), as no incompatibility is provided in this regard.

== Functions ==
Undersecretaries of State assist a minister or the President of the Council and exercise the duties delegated to them by ministerial decree (or by decree of the President of the Council) published in the Official Gazette. Undersecretaries of State may attend sittings of the Chambers and parliamentary committees as representatives of the Government, take part in debates in accordance with the minister’s directives, and respond to questions and interpellations. Deputy Ministers may be invited by the President of the Council of Ministers, in agreement with the competent minister, to attend meetings of the Council of Ministers, without voting rights, in order to report on matters and issues relating to the subjects delegated to them. Undersecretaries do not participate in meetings of the Council of Ministers, except for one of the Undersecretaries to the Presidency of the Council who, in the decree of appointment, is assigned the functions of Secretary of the Council of Ministers and who, pursuant to Article 4 of Law No. 400/1988, is responsible for recording the minutes and keeping the register of deliberations.

== List ==
=== Draghi government (2021 to 2022) ===
- Vincenzo Amendola (PD) – Delegated to European Affairs
- Franco Gabrielli (Ind.) – Delegated to the Authority for the Security of the Republic
- Giuseppe Moles (FI) – Delegated to Information and Publishing
- Bruno Tabacci (CD) – Delegated to the Coordination of Economic Policy and to Space
- Valentina Vezzali (Ind.) – Delegated to Sport (since 16 March 2021)
- Benedetto Della Vedova (+E) – Foreign Affairs
- Manlio Di Stefano (M5S) – Foreign Affairs
- Nicola Molteni (Lega) – Interior
- Ivan Scalfarotto (IV) – Interior
- Carlo Sibilia (M5S) – Interior
- Anna Macina (M5S) – Justice
- Francesco Paolo Sisto (FI) – Justice
- Giorgio Mulè (FI) – Defence
- Stefania Pucciarelli (Lega) – Defence
- Claudio Durigon (Lega) – Economy and Finance
- Maria Cecilia Guerra (Art.1) – Economy and Finance
- Alessandra Sartore (PD) – Economy and Finance
- Anna Ascani (PD) – Ministry of Economic Development
- Francesco Battistoni (FI) – Ministry of Agricultural, Food and Forestry Policies
- Gian Marco Centinaio (Lega) – Ministry of Agricultural, Food and Forestry Policies
- Ilaria Fontana (M5S) – Ministry of the Ecological Transition
- Vannia Gava (Lega) – Ministry of the Ecological Transition
- Giancarlo Cancelleri (M5S) – Ministry of Infrastructure and Transport
- Rossella Accoto (M5S) – Ministry of Labour and Social Policies
- Tiziana Nisini (Lega) – Ministry of Labour and Social Policies
- Barbara Floridia (M5S) – Ministry of Education, University and Research
- Rossano Sasso (Lega) – Ministry of Education, University and Research
- Lucia Borgonzoni (Lega) – Ministry of Culture
- Andrea Costa (NcI) – Ministry of Health
- Pierpaolo Sileri (M5S) – Ministry of Health
- Deborah Bergamini (FI) – Parliamentary Relations
- Simona Malpezzi (PD) – Parliamentary Relations
- Caterina Bini (PD) – Parliamentary Relations
- Dalila Nesci (M5S) – The South and Territorial Cohesion
- Assuntela Messina (PD) – Technological Innovation

=== Meloni government (2022 to present) ===
- Alfredo Mantovano (Ind.) – Authority for the Security of the Republic
- Alessio Butti (FdI) – Technological Innovation
- Giovanbattista Fazzolari (FdI) – Implementation of the Government Program
- Alberto Barachini (FI) – Information and Publishing
- Alessandro Morelli (Lega) – Coordination of Economic Policy
- Giorgio Silli (IaC) – Foreign Affairs
- Maria Tripodi (FI) – Foreign Affairs
- Wanda Ferro (FdI) – Interior
- Nicola Molteni (Lega) – Interior
- Emanuele Prisco (FdI) – Interior
- Isabella Rauti (FdI) – Defence (Italian Army)
- Matteo Perego di Cremnago (FI) – Defence (Italian Navy)
- Andrea Delmastro (FdI) – Justice
- Andrea Ostellari (Lega) – Justice
- Lucia Albano (FdI) – Economy and Finance
- Federico Freni (Lega) – Economy and Finance
- Sandra Savino (FI) – Economy and Finance
- Fausta Bergamotto (FdI) – Economic Development
- Massimo Bitonci (Lega) – Economic Development
- Luigi D'Eramo (Lega) – Agriculture
- Patrizio La Pietra (FdI) – Agriculture
- Claudio Barbaro (FdI) – Environment
- Tullio Ferrante (FI) – Infrastructure and Transport
- Claudio Durigon (Lega) – Labour and Social Policies
- Paola Frassinetti (FdI) – Education
- Augusta Montaruli (FdI) – University and Research
- Lucia Borgonzoni (Lega) – Culture
- Gianmarco Mazzi (FdI) – Culture
- Vittorio Sgarbi (Rin) – Culture
- Marcello Gemmato (FdI) – Health
- Giuseppina Castiello (Lega) – Parliamentary Relations
- Matilde Siracusano (FI) – Parliamentary Relations
