= Lucia Albano =

Italian politician

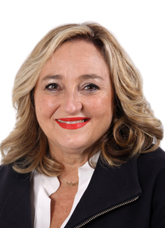

Undersecretary of State at the Ministry of Economy and Finance
- Incumbent
- Assumed office November 2, 2022
- Preceded by: Maria Cecilia Guerra; Federico Freni; Alessandra Sartore

Member of the Chamber of Deputies
- Incumbent
- Assumed office October 22, 2020

Personal details
- Born: February 11, 1965 (age 61) San Benedetto del Tronto, Italy
- Party: Brothers of Italy
- Education: Marche Polytechnic University
- Occupation: Politician

Lucia Albano (born 11 February 1965) is an Italian politician. She is a member of the Chamber of Deputies for the Brothers of Italy. She joined Parliament in October 2020.

In November 2022, she was appointed Undersecretary of State for Economy and Finance in the Meloni government.

== Biography ==
After graduating from classical high school, she graduated in 1988 with a degree in economics from the Marche Polytechnic University, then qualifying for the profession of accountant, which she has been doing since 1990, and for teaching Law and Economics. An expert in information technology, she has been a teacher of information technology in high schools in the Province of Ascoli Picenosince 1993, also performing numerous consulting and evaluation activities at public and private institutions in the area.

Married to Salvatore Nico, former president of the San Benedetto del Tronto Multiservice Company, she has two children.

== Political activity ==
In the 2018 Italian general election, she ran for the Chamber of Deputies (Italy), among the list of Brothers of Italy in the Marche - 01 plurinominal constituency, turning out to be the first of the unelected. However, on October 22, 2020 she became deputy, taking over from Francesco Acquaroli (politician), who resigned due to incompatibility as he was List of presidents of Marche. In the 19th Legislature of the Republic she was a member of the 6th Finance Commission and, briefly, of the 9th Transportation, Posts and Telecommunications Commission.

In the 2022 Italian general election, she was re-elected to the Chamber of Deputies (Italy), among the lists of Brothers of Italy as the chief candidate in the Marche - 01 multi-member constituency, being elected to Palazzo Montecitorio.

With the victory of the center-right coalition in the 2022 political elections and the following emergence of the Government of Italy headed by Giorgia Meloni, on Oct. 31, 2022, he was designated by the Council of Ministers as Undersecretary (Italy) at the Ministry of Economy and Finance (Italy), taking office on Nov. 2 and flanking Minister Giancarlo Giorgetti, later obtaining ledelegations on hydrogeological instability and reconstruction and development of Earthquake territories.
