= Italian government formation =

Italian government formation may refer to:

- 2018 Italian government formation
- 2022 Italian government formation
