= Erika Stefani =

Italian politician and lawyer

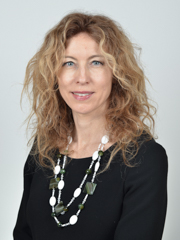

Minister for Disabilities
- In office 13 February 2021 – 22 October 2022
- Prime Minister: Mario Draghi
- Preceded by: Alessandra Locatelli (2019)
- Succeeded by: Alessandra Locatelli

Minister of Regional Affairs and Autonomies
- In office 1 June 2018 – 5 September 2019
- Prime Minister: Giuseppe Conte
- Preceded by: Paolo Gentiloni (acting); Enrico Costa
- Succeeded by: Francesco Boccia

Member of the Senate of the Republic
- Incumbent
- Assumed office 15 March 2013
- Constituency: Veneto (2013-2018; since 2022); Vicenza (2018-2022)

Personal details
- Born: 18 July 1971 (age 55) Valdagno, Vicenza, Italy
- Party: Lega Nord
- Education: University of Padua
- Profession: Lawyer

Erika Stefani (born 18 July 1971) is an Italian lawyer and politician who served as the Italian Minister of Regional Affairs and Autonomies from 1 June 2018 to 5 September 2019 and as the Italian Minister for Disabilities since 13 February 2021. A member of Lega Nord, she has served as a member of the Italian Senate since 15 March 2013.

== Biography ==
Stefani originally became involved in politics when she stood as a candidate for councillor in the comune of Trissino, in 1999, winning the election. She subsequently joined Lega Nord, and was reelected as councillor in 2009 on the Lega Nord party list. During her latter term, she also served as deputy mayor of Trissino and as councillor for urban planning.

In the Italian general election of 2013, she stood as her party's candidate for the Italian Senate for the constituency of Veneto, and won; she was reelected in the 2018 election for the constituency of Vicenza.

On 1 June 2018, Stefani was sworn in as the Minister of Regional Affairs and Autonomies. She served until 5 September 2019.

On 13 February 2021, Stefani was appointed as the Italian Minister for Disabilities.

== See also ==
- Conte Cabinet
