= Stefania Pucciarelli =

Italian politician (born 1967)

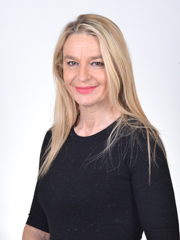
- Pucciarelli in 2018

Member of the Senate
- Incumbent
- Assumed office 23 March 2018
- Constituency: Liguria – U03 (2018–2022); Liguria – U02 (2022–present)

Personal details
- Born: 6 March 1967 (age 59)
- Party: Lega

Stefania Pucciarelli (born 6 March 1967) is an Italian politician serving as a member of the Senate since 2018. From 2021 to 2022, she served as undersecretary of the Ministry of Defence.
