= Alessandra Locatelli =

Italian politician

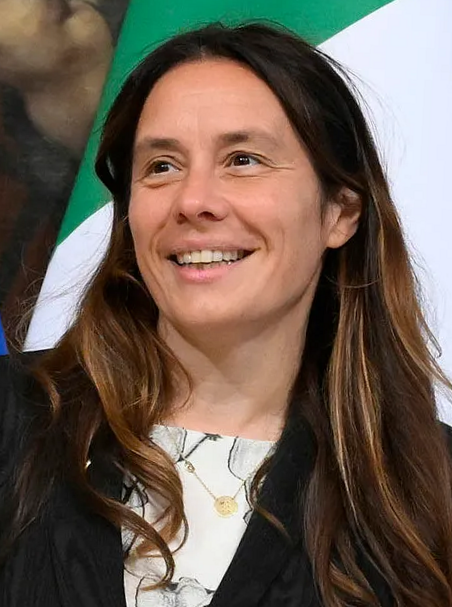
- Locatelli in 2022

Minister for Disabilities
- Incumbent
- Assumed office 22 October 2022
- Prime Minister: Giorgia Meloni
- Preceded by: Erika Stefani

Minister for Family and Disability
- In office 10 July 2019 – 5 September 2019
- Prime Minister: Giuseppe Conte
- Preceded by: Lorenzo Fontana
- Succeeded by: Elena Bonetti

Member of the Chamber of Deputies
- In office 23 March 2018 – 17 February 2021
- Constituency: Lombardy 2

Personal details
- Born: 24 September 1976 (age 50) Como, Italy
- Party: League
- Education: University of Milano-Bicocca
- Profession: Politician, educator

Alessandra Locatelli (born 24 September 1976) is an Italian politician. A member of the League, she is serving as Minister for Disabilities in the Meloni Cabinet since 2022.

== Biography ==
Alessandra Locatelli graduated in sociology at the University of Milano-Bicocca. She is an educator specializing in the care of people with mental disabilities. In March 2016 she became city secretary of the Northern League in Como. In the 2017 local elections, she was elected to the Como City Council and then appointed Deputy Mayor and Assessor by Mayor Mario Landriscina.

In 2018 she was elected to the Chamber of Deputies in the Lombardy 2 constituency. On 10 July 2019 she was designated as the new Minister for the family and disabilities of the Conte Government, to replace Lorenzo Fontana, and swore the same day.

She is not related to the footballer Manuel Locatelli.
