= Francesco Battistoni =

Italian politician (born 1967)

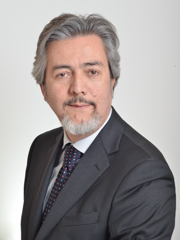
- Battistoni in 2018

Member of the Chamber of Deputies
- Incumbent
- Assumed office 13 October 2022
- Constituency: Marche – 01

Member of the Senate
- In office 23 March 2018 – 12 October 2022
- Constituency: Lazio – 05

Personal details
- Born: 23 February 1967 (age 59)
- Party: Forza Italia

Francesco Battistoni (born 23 February 1967) is an Italian politician serving as a member of the Chamber of Deputies since 2022. From 2018 to 2022, he was a member of the Senate. From 2021 to 2022, he served as undersecretary of the Ministry of Agriculture, Food and Forests. From 2004 to 2010, he served as mayor of Proceno.

== Biography ==
Born in Montefiascone but living in Proceno, in the province of Viterbo, he earned a degree in political science, with a concentration in international relations, from the “Niccolò Cusano” University. He worked for many years as a clerk in the insurance and sports industries. He is married and has three children.
