= Ministry of Labour and Social Policies (Italy) =

Government ministry

Coordinates: 41°54′22″N 12°29′20.1″E

- Ministero del lavoro e delle politiche sociali

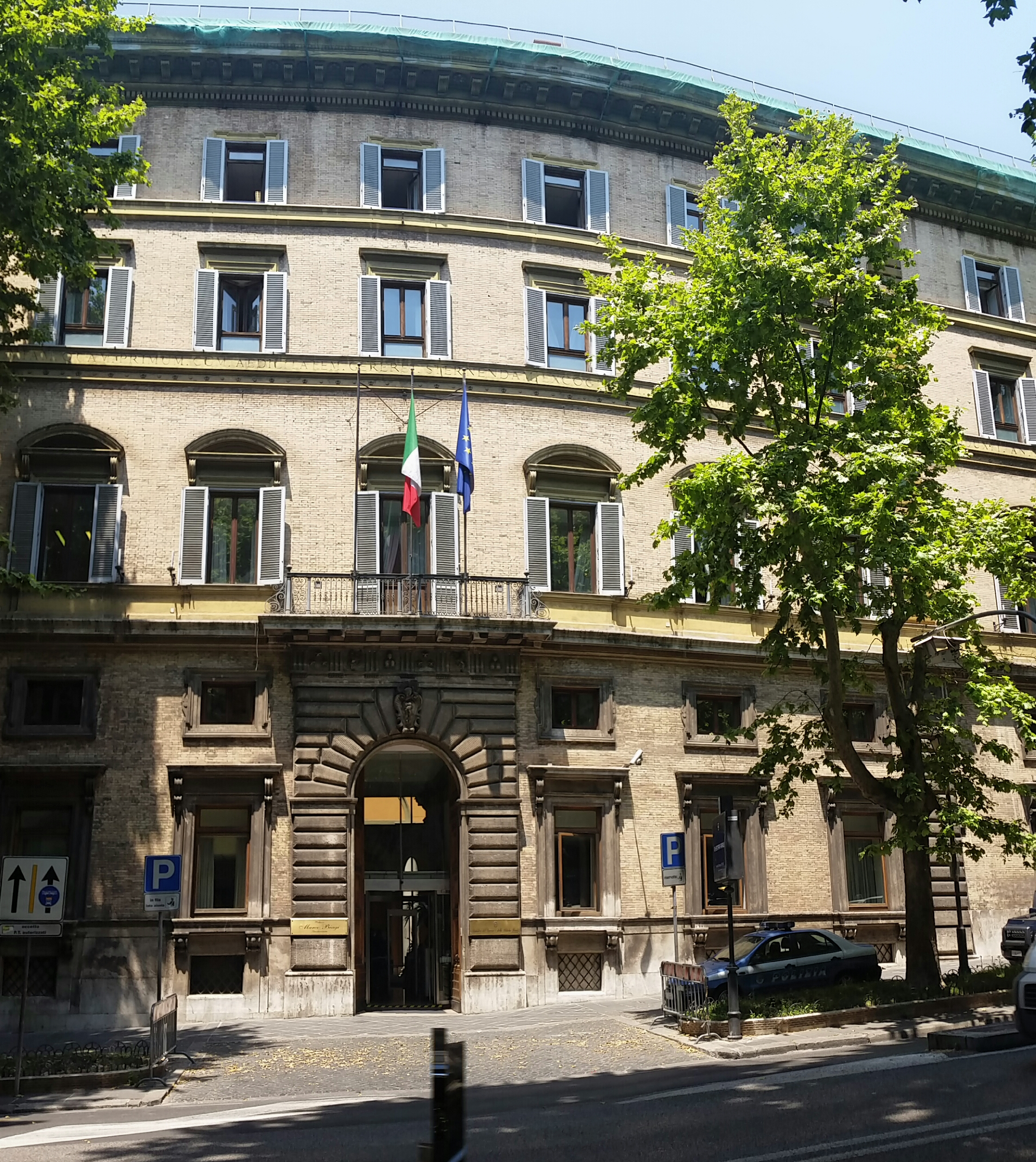
- Headquarters of the Ministry of Labour and Social Policies in Rome

Department overview
- Formed: 2001
- Preceding Department: Ministry of Labour, Health and Social Policies
- Jurisdiction: Government of Italy
- Headquarters: Rome, Italy
- Minister responsible: Marina Elvira Calderone
- Website: lavoro.gov.it

The Ministry of Labour and Social Policies (Italian: Ministero del lavoro e delle politiche sociali) is a department of the government of the Republic of Italy responsible for policies of labour, employment, labour protection, the adequacy of social security system, and social policy. It is headquartered in Palazzo Balestra on Via Veneto. The office is led by the Minister of Labour and Social Policies, a post held by Marina Calderone since 22 October 2022.
