= 2022 Italian government formation =

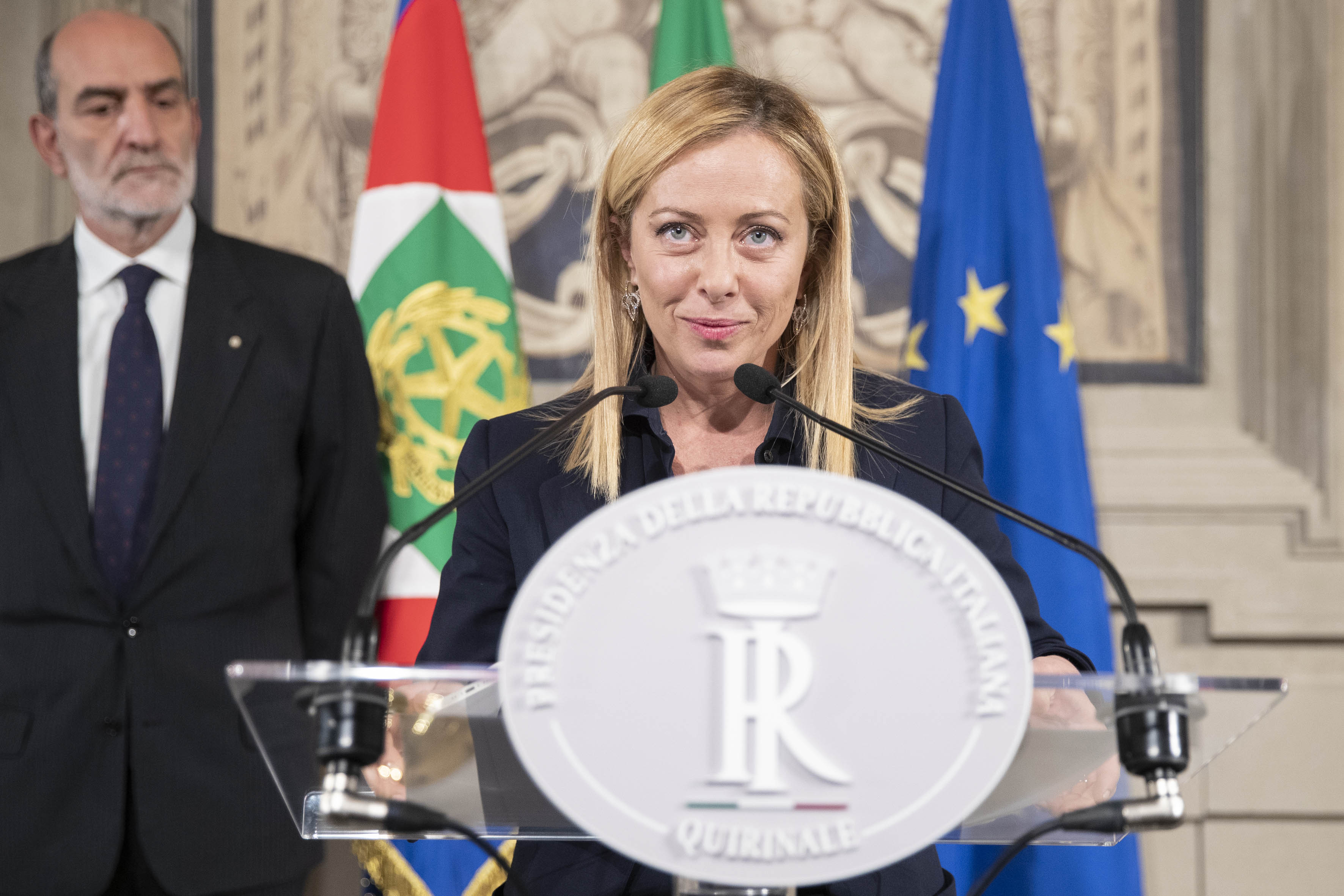
- Giorgia Meloni accepting the task of forming the new government
- Date: 20 October 2022 – 22 October 2022
- Location: Italy
- Type: Parliamentary government formation
- Cause: 2022 Italian general election
- Participants: FdI, PD, Lega, M5S, FI, A–IV, Aut, CdI, Mixed Group
- Outcome: Formation of the Meloni Cabinet

In the 2022 Italian general election, the centre-right coalition led by Giorgia Meloni's Brothers of Italy (FdI) won an absolute majority of seats in the Italian Parliament. On 20 October, a few days following the elections of the presidents of the two houses of Parliament (Ignazio La Russa of FdI on 13 October for the Senate of the Republic and Lorenzo Fontana of the Lega on 14 October for the Chamber of Deputies), consultations on the formation of a new cabinet officially began.

The Cabinet was announced on 21 October and was officially sworn in on the next day. It was one of the fastest government formations in the history of the Italian Republic. The first Italian cabinet headed by a female prime minister, it was variously described as a shift to the political right, and as the first far-right-led Italian government since World War II.

== Post-election developments ==
=== Election of parliamentary speakers ===
On 13 October, FdI's Ignazio La Russa was elected President of the Senate of the Republic. He is the first politician with a neo-fascist background and to come from a post-fascist party to hold the position, which is the second highest-ranking office of the Italian Republic. He was proclaimed president by Liliana Segre, a senator for life and Holocaust survivor, who presided the first meeting of the Senate due to her being the oldest member present. On 14 October, Lorenzo Fontana, who is widely seen as an ultraconservative for his long-time anti-abortion and anti-LGBT views, was elected President of the Chamber of Deputies for the Lega.

=== Tensions within the centre-right coalition ===
Immediately after the first meeting of the new legislature, the XIX legislature of Italy, tensions began to grow within the centre-right coalition. On 13 October, Silvio Berlusconi's Forza Italia (FI) refused to support La Russa's candidacy for President of the Senate of the Republic. La Russa nonetheless succeeded in being elected by obtaining 116 votes out of 206 in the first round, thanks to support from opposition parties.

Tensions further grew, in particular between Berlusconi and Meloni, whom Berlusconi described as "patronising, overbearing, arrogant ... [and] offensive" in a series of written notes in the Senate. Additionally, Berlusconi's views of the Russian invasion of Ukraine and Vladimir Putin, with whom he said he was rekindling their friendship and claimed to have received vodka as a gift and exchanged letters, came to light a few days later, when a recording of a private conversation between him and MPs from his party was leaked. Meloni declared that "Italy, with its head high, is part of Europe and the Atlantic Alliance", before adding: "Whoever doesn't agree with this cornerstone cannot be part of the government, at the cost of not having a government."

=== Meloni Cabinet ===
During talks with President Sergio Mattarella on 20 October, delegates from the Democratic Party, the Five Star Movement, Action – Italia Viva, For the Autonomies, and various sub-groups within the Mixed Group stated they would not back a Meloni-led government during confidence votes. On the following day, delegates from FdI, the Lega, FI, and Civics of Italy, as well as Us Moderates and the Associative Movement Italians Abroad subgroup within the Mixed Group, which together held 237 seats out of 400 in the lower house and 116 seats out of 206 in the upper house, announced to Mattarella they had reached an agreement to form a coalition government with Meloni as prime minister. In the afternoon, Mattarella summoned Meloni to the Quirinal Palace and gave her the task of forming a new cabinet, which was officially sworn in on 22 October.

On 31 October, the government nominated its deputy ministers and undersecretaries. Galeazzo Bignami, one of the chosen deputy ministers, caused controversy and garnered international attention as a 2005 photo of him with a Nazi armband became public.

=== Investiture votes ===
On 25 October, Meloni gave her first official speech as Prime Minister in front of the Chamber of Deputies, before the confidence vote on her cabinet. During her speech, she stressed the weight of being the first woman to serve as head of the Italian government. Meloni thanked several Italian women, notably including Tina Anselmi, Samantha Cristoforetti, Grazia Deledda, Oriana Fallaci, Nilde Iotti, Rita Levi-Montalcini, and Maria Montessori, who she said, "with the boards of their own examples, built the ladder that today allows me to climb and break the heavy glass ceiling placed over our heads." Later that same day, the Chamber of Deputies approved the Meloni Cabinet with 235 votes in favor, 154 votes against, and 5 abstentions. On 26 October, the Senate of the Republic approved the Meloni Cabinet with 115 votes in favor, 79 against, and 5 abstentions. Senators for life Elena Cattaneo and Mario Monti abstained, while senators for life Liliana Segre, Carlo Rubbia, Renzo Piano, and Giorgio Napolitano were not present during the vote.

25–26 October 2022 Investiture votes for the Meloni Cabinet
House of Parliament	Vote	Parties	Votes
Chamber of Deputies (Voting: 389 of 400, Majority: 195)	Yes	FdI, Lega, FI, NM, MAIE	235 / 389
Chamber of Deputies (Voting: 389 of 400, Majority: 195)	No	PD, M5S, A–IV, AVS, +E	154 / 389
Chamber of Deputies (Voting: 389 of 400, Majority: 195)	Abstention	SVP, ScN	5 / 400
Senate of the Republic (Voting: 199 of 206, Majority: 98)	Yes	FdI, Lega, FI, NM, MAIE	115 / 199
Senate of the Republic (Voting: 199 of 206, Majority: 98)	No	PD, M5S, A–IV, AVS, Cb	79 / 199
Senate of the Republic (Voting: 199 of 206, Majority: 98)	Abstention	SVP, ScN, senators for life	5 / 199
