= Matilde Siracusano =

Italian politician (born 1985)

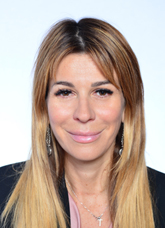
- Siracusano in 2022

Undersecretary for Parliamentary Relations
- Incumbent
- Assumed office 2 November 2022

Member of the Chamber of Deputies
- Incumbent
- Assumed office 23 March 2018
- Constituency: Sicily 1 – 02 (2018–2022); Piedmont 2 – 02 (since 2022)

Personal details
- Born: 26 April 1985 (age 41) Messina, Italy
- Party: Forza Italia (since 2017)
- Domestic partner: Roberto Occhiuto
- Education: University of Messina; Luiss University

Matilde Siracusano (born 26 April 1985) is an Italian politician who has been a member of the Chamber of Deputies since 2018 and has served as Undersecretary for Parliamentary Relations since 2022. Born in Messina, Siracusano studied political science at the University of Messina and later obtained a master's degree in Italian Political Affairs from Luiss University in Rome. Before entering national politics, she worked in human resources and in her family's construction business, and collaborated with Sicilian television networks and the Rome-based newspaper Il Tempo. She also competed in Miss Italia, representing Sicily in 2005.

Siracusano began her political career at the Chamber of Deputies in 2012, working with parliamentary groups and members of the Mixed Group before joining Forza Italia in 2017. She was first elected to the Chamber of Deputies in 2018 and re-elected in 2022. She has served on several parliamentary committees and was appointed Undersecretary for Parliamentary Relations in the Meloni government in October 2022.

== Early life and career ==
Siracusano was born on 26 April 1985 in Messina, the daughter of Salvatore Siracusano, an entrepreneur who owned Tele Time, a Sicilian television station in the 1980s, a politician for Christian Democracy who served as a local councillor from 1985 to 1990 and as regional assessor for public works for the province of Messina, and a distant relative of former minister Antonio Martino.

After graduating with a degree in political science from the University of Messina, Siracusano moved to Rome, where she continued her studies at the LUISS School of Government, earning a master's degree in Italian Political Affairs (MAPI). She has worked as a human resources manager for construction companies and has collaborated with several Sicilian television networks. From 2013 to 2017, Siracusano held executive positions in the family business, Italiana Costruzioni.

In 2005, Siracusano participated in Miss Italia. She subsequently started to contribute to Il Tempo, writing articles on political news. In the 2018 Italian general election, as a member of Forza Italia within the centre-right coalition, she was elected to Chamber of Deputies. Re-elected in the 2022 Italian general election, she was appointed in the Meloni government as Undersecretary for Parliamentary Relations.

== Political career ==
=== Chamber of Deputies ===
Siracusano in 2018

In 2012, Siracusano began her professional political career at the Chamber of Deputies, working for the parliamentary groups of the Union of the Centre and Civic Choice, and subsequently with members of the Mixed Group of the Chamber of Deputies, including Giovanni Monchiero, Edoardo Nesi, and Andrea Vecchio. From 2013 to 2017, she was responsible for coordinating and organising events for the youth groups of Civic Choice within the party's office for relations with local communities.

In 2017, Siracusano joined Forza Italia. In the 2018 general election, she stood for the Chamber of Deputies both in the Sicily 2 – 01 single-member constituency (Messina), supported by the centre-right coalition, and as the lead candidate in the Sicily 1 – 02 multi-member constituency. In the single-member constituency, she received 29.49% of the vote and was defeated by Five Star Movement candidate Francesco D'Uva, who received 45.33%, while she was elected in the multi-member constituency.

During the legislature, Siracusano served on the 4th Defence Commission from 2018 to 2019 and the 2nd Justice Commission from 2019 to 2021 and from 2021 to 2022. She also briefly served on the 11th Labour Commission in 2021 and the 9th Transport, Posts and Telecommunications Commission in 2021, replacing Deborah Bergamini, who was serving as Undersecretary of State for Parliamentary Relations in the Draghi government.

=== Undersecretary for Parliamentary Relations ===
In the 2022 snap election, Siracusano stood for re-election to the Chamber of Deputies both in the Sicily 2 – 06 single-member constituency (Messina), supported by the centre-right coalition, and on the Forza Italia lists in the multi-member constituencies of Sicily 2 – 02, where she was the lead candidate, Puglia – 04, and Piedmont 2 – 02, where she was second on the list. In the single-member constituency, she received 29.07% of the vote and was defeated by Francesco Gallo of South calls North, who received 32.25%. She was nevertheless re-elected to through the multi-member constituencies and opted for the seat in Piedmont.

During the legislature, Siracusano became a member of the 7th Culture, Science and Education Commission. She was replaced on the commission following her appointment to the government, first by Stefano Benigni and subsequently by Rosaria Tassinari. Following the formation of the Meloni government after the 2022 general election, Siracusano was appointed Undersecretary of State for Parliamentary Relations on 31 October. She took office as part of the Meloni government on 2 November.

== Personal life ==
Siracusano was married to Salvatore Zanna, an officer in the Italian Air Force. Since 2021, she has been in a relationship with Roberto Occhiuto, the president of Calabria since 29 October 2021, with whom she has a son, Tommaso, who was born in 2022. Siracusano taught catechism for a period and competed in the 2005 edition of Miss Italia, where she represented Sicily and was among the finalists. In her spare time, she practises kickboxing and has also practised karate.

In September 2026, a digitally altered photograph of Siracusano was published by far-right politician Roberto Vannacci on social media during the campaign for the 2026 Italian by-elections in Reggio Calabria. The image, based on a photograph originally posted by Siracusano, showed her with a substantially deeper neckline than in the original, in which she was wearing a white top under her jacket. Siracusano said that the original photograph had been taken from her personal Instagram account and altered, and stated that she was considering legal action. Vannacci denied having personally altered the photograph, saying that he had taken it from a Calabrian blog and shared it on his Facebook page. The episode prompted public statements of support for Siracusano from figures across the political spectrum.
