= Minister for Disabilities =

Ministry in the Cabinet of Italy

The minister for disabilities (Italian: ministro per le disabilità) in Italy is one of the positions in the Italian government; all the ministers belonged to the League party.

The current minister for disabilities is Alessandra Locatelli, who held the office since 22 October 2022.

Parties

- League

Governments

- Mixed coalition
- Centre-right coalition

Portrait	Name (Born–Died)	Term of office			Party	Government	Ref.
Portrait	Name (Born–Died)	Took office	Left office	Time in office	Party	Government	Ref.
Minister for Family and Disability
	Lorenzo Fontana (1980–)	1 June 2018	10 July 2019	1 year, 39 days	League	Conte I	
	Alessandra Locatelli (1976–)	10 July 2019	5 September 2019	57 days	League	Conte I	
Office not in use		2019–2021				Conte II	
Minister for Disabilities
	Erika Stefani (1971–)	13 February 2021	22 October 2022	1 year, 251 days	League	Draghi	
	Alessandra Locatelli (1976–)	22 October 2022	Incumbent	3 years, 32 days	League	Meloni	
