= Andrea Delmastro Delle Vedove =

Italian politician (born 1976)

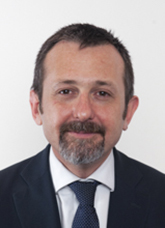
- Delmastro Delle Vedove in 2018

Member of the Chamber of Deputies
- Incumbent
- Assumed office 23 March 2018
- Constituency: Piedmont 2

Personal details
- Born: 22 October 1976 (age 49)
- Party: Brothers of Italy

Andrea Delmastro Delle Vedove (born 22 October 1976) is an Italian politician of Brothers of Italy serving as a member of the Chamber of Deputies. He was first elected in the 2018 general election, and was re-elected in 2022. Since 2022, he has served as undersecretary of the Ministry of Justice. He resigned on 24 March 2026.

== Biography ==
Born on October 22, 1976, in Gattinara, in the province of Vercelli, he is the son of Sandro, a lawyer and politician with the National Alliance (Italy), for which he served as a member of parliament from 1996 to 2006. Delmastro graduated with a law degree from the University of Turin and became a criminal defense attorney like his father, registered with the Biella Bar Association; he is currently suspended from practicing law due to his position as Undersecretary of State.

He has a younger sister, Francesca, who is also a politician with the Fratelli d'Italia party and has served as mayor of Rosazza (BI) since June 6, 2016.
