= Marcello Gemmato =

Italian politician (born 1972)

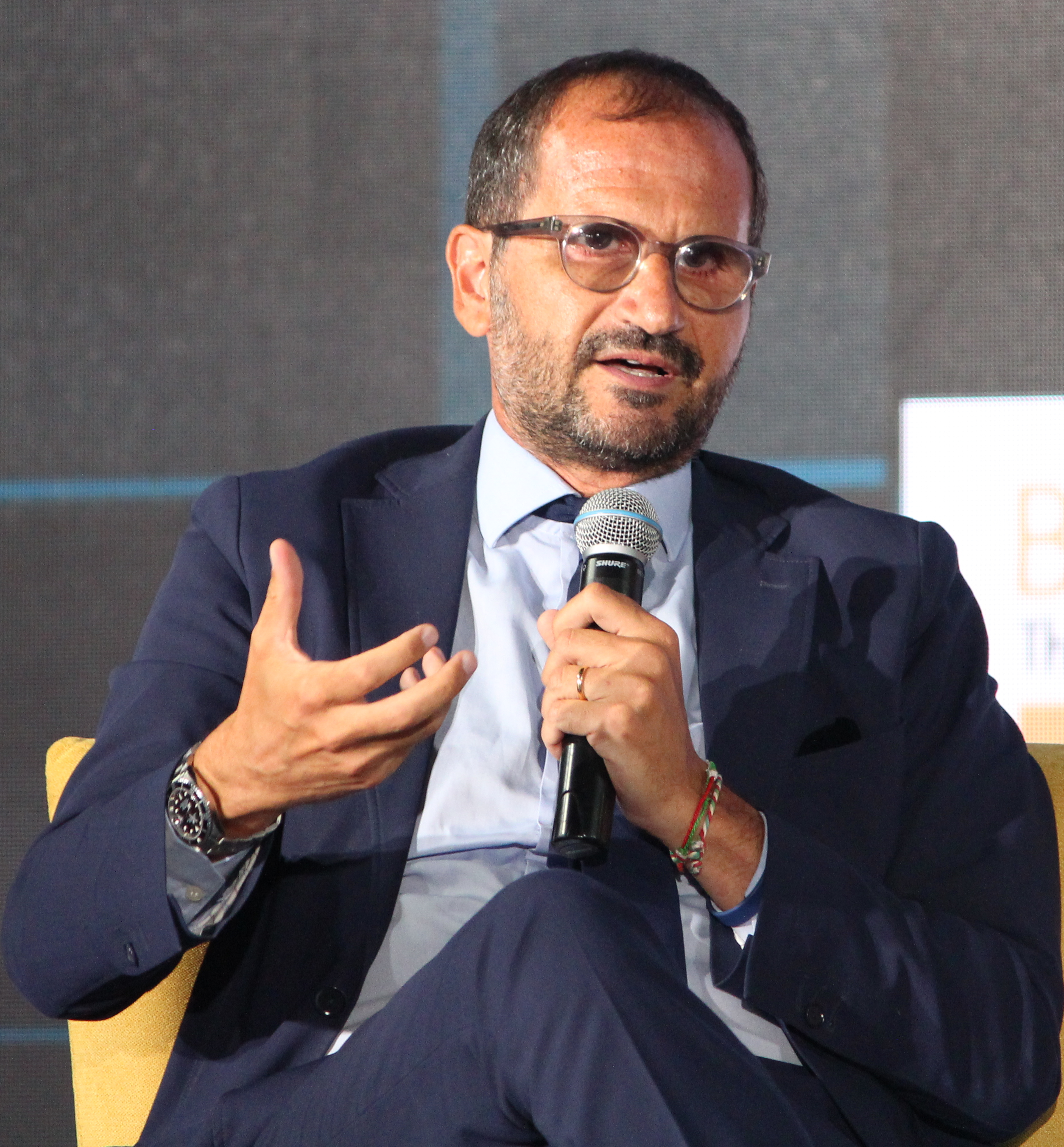
- Gemmato in 2022

Member of the Chamber of Deputies
- Incumbent
- Assumed office 23 March 2018
- Constituency: Apulia

Personal details
- Born: 21 December 1972 (age 53)
- Party: MSI (until 1995); AN (1995–2009); PdL (2009–2012); FdI (Since 2012)

Marcello Gemmato (born 21 December 1972) is an Italian politician of Brothers of Italy serving as a member of the Chamber of Deputies. He was first elected in the 2018 general election, and was re-elected in 2022. Since 2022, he has served as undersecretary of the Ministry of Health.
