= Alessio Butti =

Italian politician (born 1964)

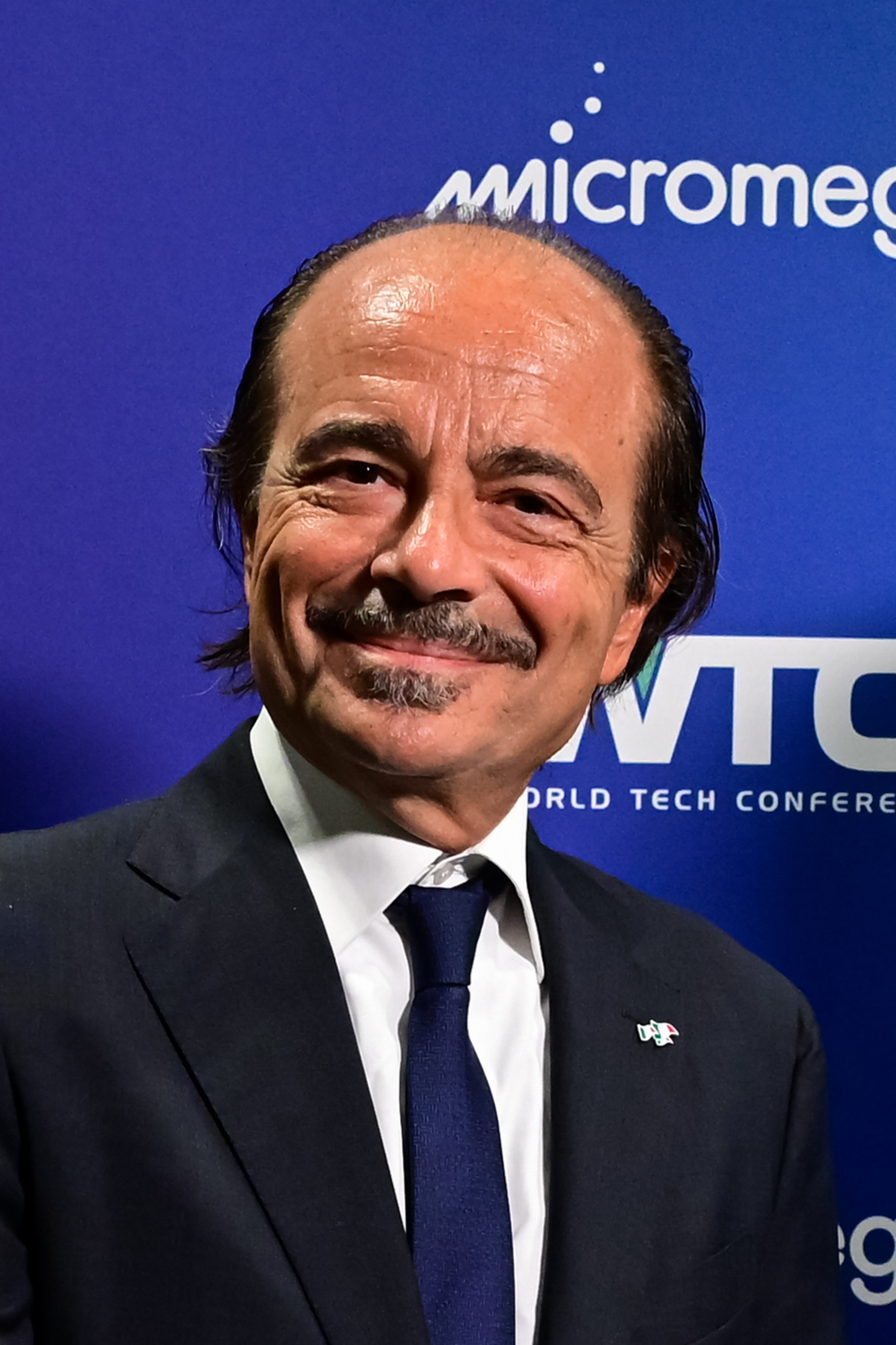
- Butti in 2026

Member of the Senate of the Republic
- Incumbent
- Assumed office 13 October 2022
- In office 28 April 2006 – 14 March 2013

Member of the Chamber of Deputies
- In office 23 March 2018 – 12 October 2022
- In office 9 May 1996 – 27 April 2006
- In office 23 April 1992 – 14 April 1994

Personal details
- Born: 15 October 1964 (age 61)
- Party: FdI (2012–present)
- Other party: MSI (until 1995); AN (1995–2009); PdL (2009–2012)

Alessio Butti (born 15 October 1964) is an Italian politician of Brothers of Italy serving as a member of the Senate of the Republic. He was elected to the Chamber of Deputies in the 1992, 1996, 2001 and 2018 elections, and was elected to the senate in the 2006 and 2022 elections. Since 2022, he has been undersecretary to the Presidency of the Council of Ministers for technological innovation.
