= Matteo Perego di Cremnago =

Italian politician (born 1982)

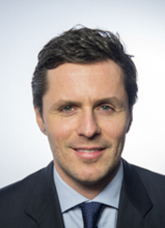
- Perego di Cremnago in 2018

Member of the Chamber of Deputies
- In office 23 March 2018 – 12 October 2022
- Constituency: Lombardy 4

Personal details
- Born: 18 August 1982 (age 43)
- Party: Forza Italia

Matteo Perego di Cremnago (born 18 August 1982) is an Italian politician serving as undersecretary of the Ministry of Defence since 2022. From 2018 to 2022, he was a member of the Chamber of Deputies.
