= Augusta Montaruli =

Italian politician

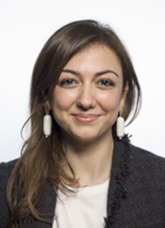

Member of the Chamber of Deputies of the Italian Republic
- Incumbent
- Assumed office 23 March 2018
- Preceded by: constituency established
- Constituency: Piemonte 1 - 03 (Turin-Vallette)

Undersecretary of State at the Ministry of University and Research
- In office 2 November 2022 – 24 February 2023
- Prime Minister: Giorgia Meloni
- Minister: Anna Maria Bernini

Personal details
- Born: 14 September 1983 (age 43) Italy
- Party: Brothers of Italy
- Education: University of Turin (Law degree magna cum laude)

Augusta Anita Laura Montaruli (born 14 September 1983 in Turin) is an Italian politician and lawyer. She is a member of the right-wing Brothers of Italy party, led by current Italian PM Giorgia Meloni.

From 2 November 2022 to 24 February 2023 Montaruli was a member of the Meloni Government, serving as Undersecretary of State at the Ministry of University and Research under the leadership of Minister Anna Maria Bernini (FI). She resigned from the post after the Supreme Court of Cassation confirmed her embezzlement conviction. She continues to serve as a Deputy in the Italian Parliament. On 5 February 2025, in a public TV political debate, she famously staged a singular protest by barking to stop opposition deputy Marco Furfaro from commenting on her conviction.

== Biography ==
Born on September 14, 1983, in Turin, the daughter of parents from Apulia originally from Corato (BA), she attended the Galileo Ferraris Scientific High School in Turin, where she graduated and first became interested in politics. She then earned a law degree from the University of Turin. A criminal defense attorney since 2016, she is a member of the Turin Bar Association.

== See also ==
- List of members of the Italian Chamber of Deputies, 2018–
