= Giovanbattista Fazzolari =

Italian politician (born 1972)

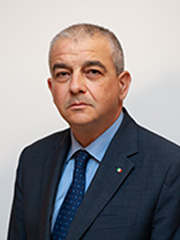
- Fazzolari in 2022

Member of the Senate of the Republic
- Incumbent
- Assumed office 23 March 2018
- Constituency: Piedmont (2018–2022); Apulia (2022–present)

Personal details
- Born: 24 February 1972 (age 54)
- Party: Brothers of Italy

Giovanbattista Fazzolari (born 24 February 1972) is an Italian politician of Brothers of Italy serving as a member of the Senate of the Republic. He was first elected in the 2018 general election, and was re-elected in 2022. Since 2022, he has been undersecretary to the Presidency of the Council of Ministers for the implementation of the government program.

== Biography ==
He was born in Messina, but now lives in the hamlet of Fregene in Fiumicino (Rome), into a family of Sicilian and Calabrian origin. His mother, Angelica Bellantone, is a teacher from Messina, originally from Villafranca Tirrena, while his father, Michele Lucia Fazzolari, is a diplomat from Reggio Calabria, originally from Bovalino. His grandfather, whose name and surname he bears, owned an important biscuit factory; he grew up abroad following his father between France, Argentina, and Turkey.

After graduating from the French high school Lycée français Chateaubriand in Rome in 1989, he went on to earn a degree in economics and business from the Sapienza University of Rome,” then completing a postgraduate course in European Community Operations at the Italian Society for International Organizations.

He served for five years as director of Airports and Strategic Infrastructure for the Lazio, during which time he was appointed Mobility Manager for the Lazio Region and anti-corruption representative for the Regional Department of Urban Planning and Mobility. He was a partner in the company Ares Consulenze s.r.l., for which he directed several projects such as the Fare Impresa network of help desks and the Imprenditori del Domani (Entrepreneurs of Tomorrow) project carried out with La Sapienza University.

From 2002 to 2004, he was deputy commissioner of the Monti Simbruini Regional Nature Park in Lazio. He has been a freelancer since 2017.
