= Emanuele Prisco =

Italian politician (born 1977)

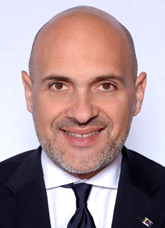
- Prisco in 2022

Member of the Chamber of Deputies
- Incumbent
- Assumed office 23 March 2018
- Constituency: Umbria

Personal details
- Born: 23 November 1977 (age 48)
- Party: Brothers of Italy

Emanuele Prisco (born 23 November 1977) is an Italian politician of Brothers of Italy serving as a member of the Chamber of Deputies. He was first elected in the 2018 general election, and was re-elected in 2022. Since 2022, he has served as undersecretary of the Ministry of the Interior.
