= Andrea Ostellari =

Italian politician (born 1974)

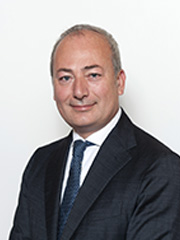
- Ostellari in 2022

Member of the Senate
- Incumbent
- Assumed office 23 March 2018
- Constituency: Veneto – 02 (2018–2022); Veneto – 02 (2022–present)

Personal details
- Born: 17 March 1974 (age 52)
- Party: Lega (since 2017)

Andrea Ostellari (born 17 March 1974) is an Italian politician serving as undersecretary of the Ministry of Justice since 2022. He has been a member of the Senate since 2018.
