= Patrizio La Pietra =

Italian politician (born 1961)

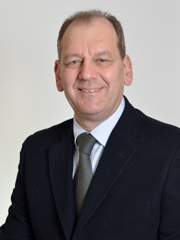
- La Pietra in 2022

Member of the Senate
- Incumbent
- Assumed office 23 March 2018
- Constituency: Tuscany – 03 (2018–2022); Tuscany – 03 (2022–present)

Personal details
- Born: 10 April 1961 (age 65)
- Party: Brothers of Italy (since 2012)

Patrizio Giacomo La Pietra (born 10 April 1961) is an Italian politician serving as undersecretary of the Ministry of Agriculture, Food Sovereignty and Forests since 2022. He has been a member of the Senate since 2018.
