= Vannia Gava =

Italian politician (born 1974)

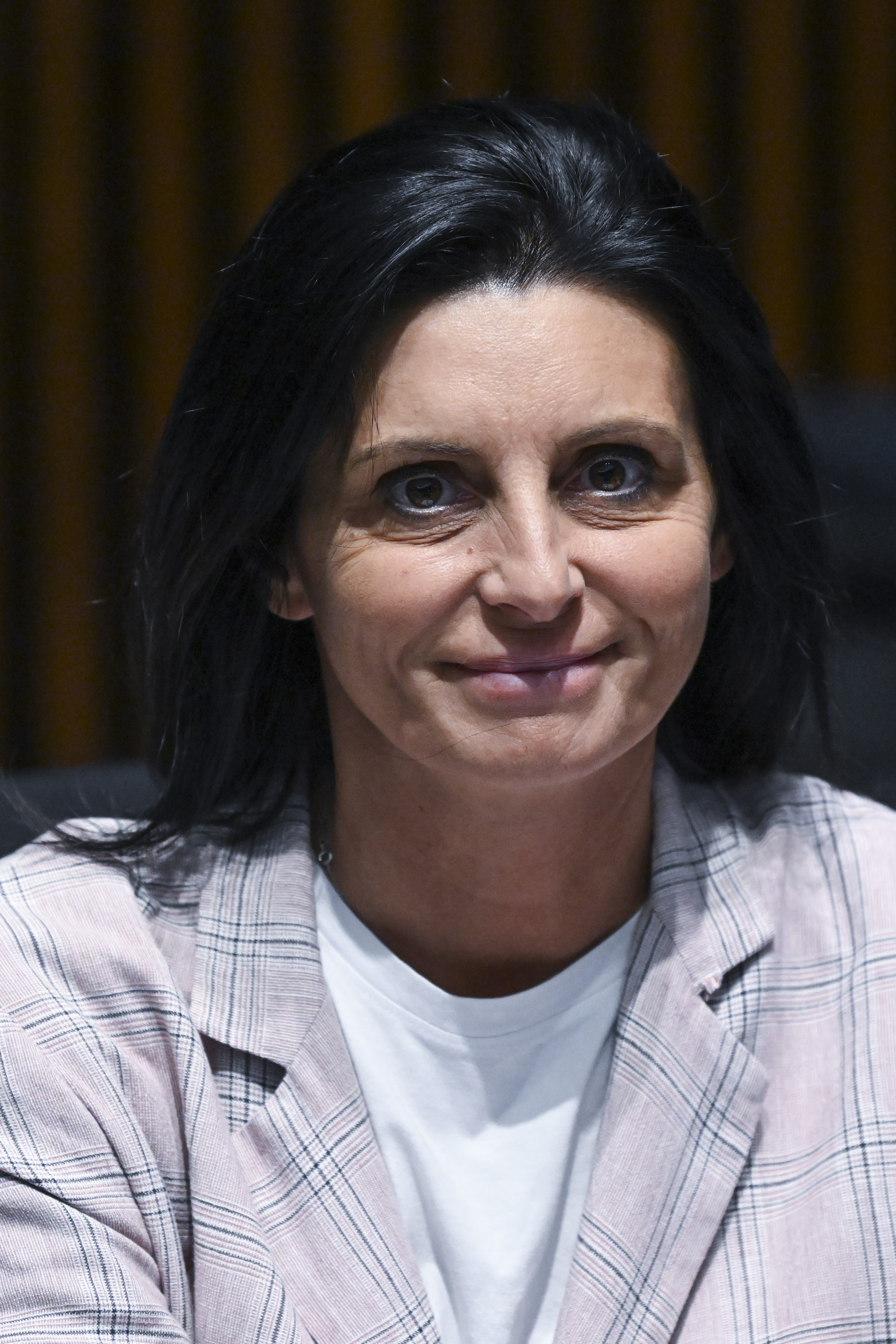
Vannia Gava in 2024.

Vannia Gava (born 30 June 1974) is an Italian politician from Lega Nord. She was Undersecretary at the Ministry of the Ecological Transition in the Draghi Cabinet.

After the victory of the centre-right coalition during the 2022 Italian general election and the formation of the Meloni government on 31 October 2022, she was appointed deputy minister of the environment and energy security by the Council of Ministers, taking office on 2 November.
