= Alberto Barachini =

Italian politician (born 1972)

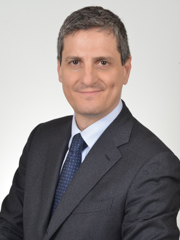
- Barachini in 2018

Member of the Senate of the Republic
- Incumbent
- Assumed office 23 March 2018
- Constituency: Lombardy

Personal details
- Born: 21 August 1972 (age 54) Pisa, Italy
- Party: Forza Italia

Alberto Barachini (born 21 August 1972) is an Italian journalist and politician of Forza Italia serving as a member of the Senate of the Republic. He was first elected in the 2018 general election, and was re-elected in 2022. Since 2022, he has served as undersecretary to the Presidency of the Council of Ministers for publishing.

== Biography ==
The son of Enrico Barachini, a tax advisor and executive of multiple Italian and international companies, he was born Aug. 21, 1972, in Pisa, where he graduated in Humanities with a bachelor's degree with 110 cum laude from the Faculty (division) of Arts and Philosophy at the University of Pisa, then moved and lived in Milan, Italy.

He began his journalistic career at a very young age in 1994, as a reporter at the Tuscany newspaper Il Tirreno.

In 1999, he began working for the Mediaset group, starting alongside Emilio Fede at TG4, then continuing as chief news anchor and anchor of TG4, covering politics, Italian and international news (Iraq, Albania, United States of America, Tunisia, Bulgaria, Iceland, Germany, Spain). Later, after leading the national and regional news for the TGcom24 newspaper, he became the central Editor-in-chief of Mediaset's All-news radiochannel Tgcom24, for which he coordinated the activities and journalistic Broadcast programming, led the Television station network's morning and afternoon in-depth reports and the daily program "Checkpoint," interviewing the protagonists of the Italian political, economic and culture world.

In recent years, he has lectured on television journalism in the undergraduate and master's degree programs in communication at several University, such as IULM, LUMSA, Università Cattolica del Sacro Cuore in Milan and NABA.

== Political activity ==
Ahead of the 2018 Italian general election, he was a candidate in the lists of Forza Italia, for the Senate of the RepublicItaly in the Lombardy - 02 plurality constituency, being elected senator. In the Legislature XVIII of Italy, in addition to being a member of the 8th Commission on Public Works, Communications, he was chairman of the Parliamentary Commission of Vigilance Rai, elected on July 18, 2018, on the third ballot and remained in office for its entire duration.

In the 2022 Italian general election he was re-elected to the Senate, among the Forza Italia lists in the Lombardy - 01 plurinominal constituencies in second position and Lombardy - 02 in third position, being re-elected in the latter to the Palazzo Madama, Rome. In the Legislature XIX of Italy he is treasurer of the Forza Italia parliamentary group "Forza Italia-Berlusconi Presidente-PPE" in the Senate, as well as a member of the 7th Committee on Public Education, Cultural Heritage replaced by Roberto Rosso.
