= Maria Tripodi =

Italian politician (born 1982)

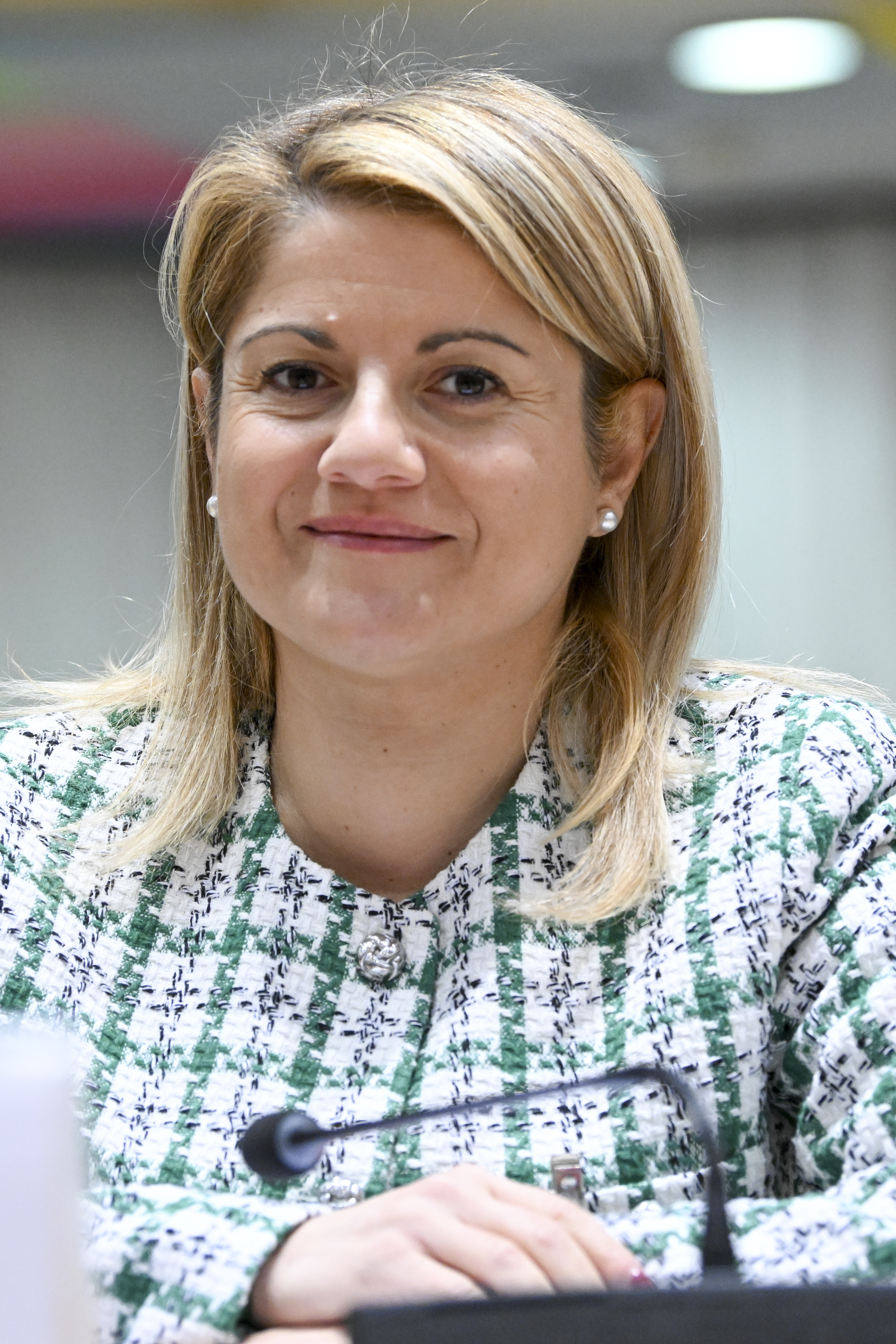
- Tripodi in 2023

Undersecretary of the Ministry of Foreign Affairs
- Incumbent
- Assumed office 2 November 2022
- Prime Minister: Giorgia Meloni

Member of the Chamber of Deputies
- In office 23 March 2018 – 12 October 2022
- Constituency: Calabria

Personal details
- Born: 21 July 1982 (age 43)
- Party: Forza Italia

Maria Tripodi (born 21 July 1982) is an Italian politician of Forza Italia. Since 2022, she has served as undersecretary of the Ministry of Foreign Affairs. From 2018 to 2022, she was a member of the Chamber of Deputies.
