= Fausta Bergamotto =

Italian politician (born 1968)

Undersecretary of the Ministry for Business and Made in Italy
- Incumbent
- Assumed office 2 November 2022
- Prime Minister: Giorgia Meloni

Personal details
- Born: 28 July 1968 (age 57)
- Party: Brothers of Italy

Fausta Bergamotto (born 28 July 1968) is an Italian politician of Brothers of Italy who has served as undersecretary of the Ministry for Business and Made in Italy since 2022. She served as councilor for public companies, personnel, and legal affairs in L'Aquila from 2019 to 2022, and has worked for the Presidency of the Council of Ministers since 2004.
