= Nicola Molteni =

Italian politician

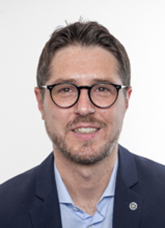
Nicola Molteni in 2018.

Nicola Molteni (born 6 March 1976) is an Italian politician from Lega Nord. He is currently Undersecretary at the Ministry of the Interior in the Meloni Cabinet.
