= Marina Elvira Calderone =

Italian politician (born 1965)

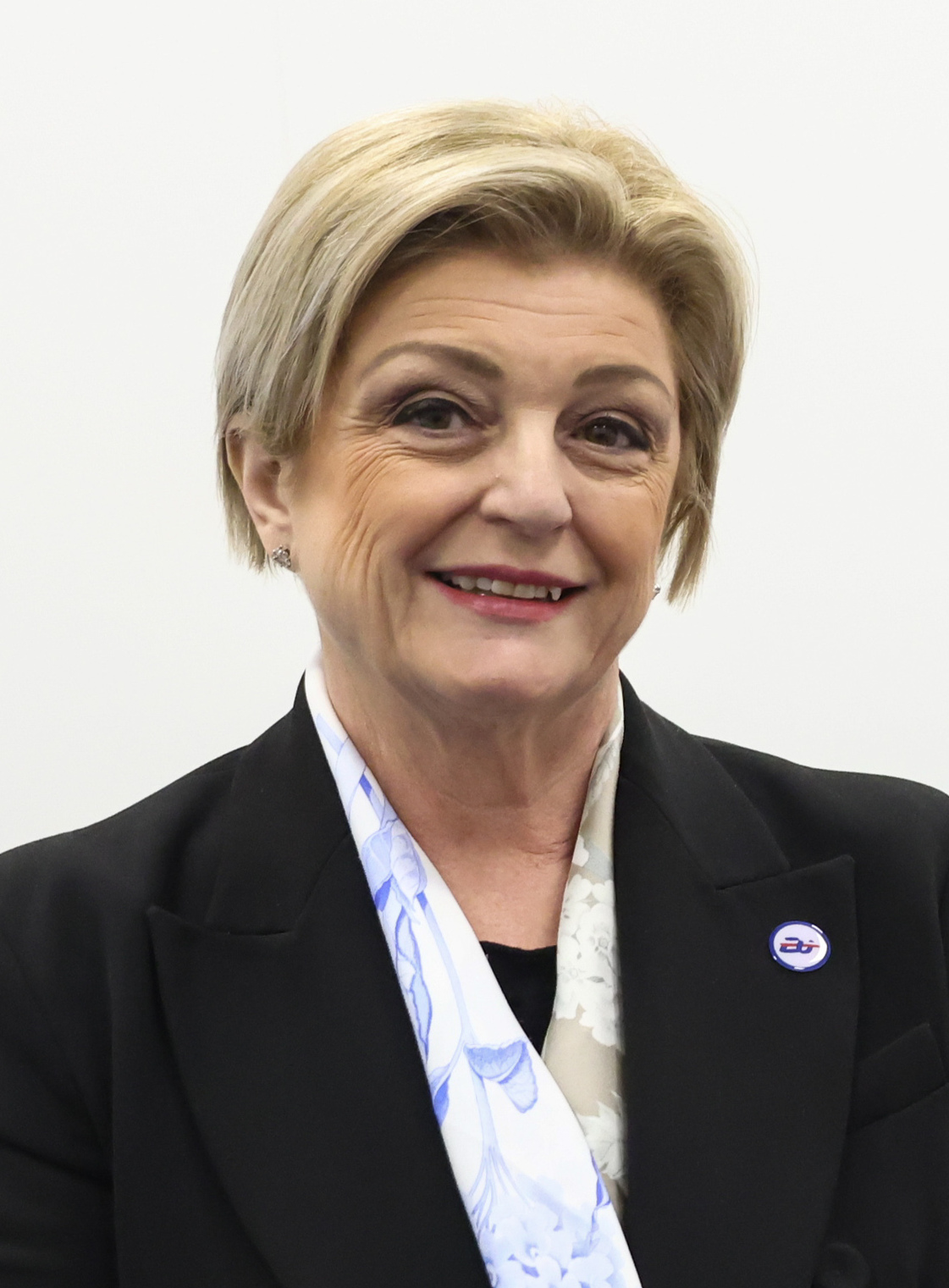
- Calderone in 2025

Minister of Labour and Social Policies
- Incumbent
- Assumed office 22 October 2022
- Prime Minister: Giorgia Meloni
- Preceded by: Andrea Orlando

Personal details
- Born: 30 July 1965 (age 61) Bonorva, Italy
- Party: Independent
- Education: Link Campus University
- Profession: Labour consultant

Marina Elvira Calderone (born 30 July 1965) is an Italian politician. In October 2022, she was appointed Minister of Labour and Social Policies in the Meloni Cabinet.

== Biography ==
Marina Calderone affirmed she obtained a degree in International Business Economics from the University of Cagliari, but this information has not been confirmed by the university. According to a report from Il Fatto Quotidiano, she actually obtained her degree from Link Campus University, where her husband is the president. She funded the same University using the budget of the labour consultant association she managed. Il Fatto Quotidiano stated that Calderone « bought » her diploma.

Together with her husband Rosario De Luca, she runs a company that provides job consulting services, with offices in Cagliari, Reggio Calabria, and Rome.

In 1994, she joined the competent territorial order of Labor Consultants and in 2005 became President of the National Council of the Order of Labour Consultants. In 2014, she was appointed by Renzi government in the board of directors of Leonardo-Finmeccanica, a position she held until 2020. Subsequently in the Conte I Cabinet, she was nominated for the presidency of the National Institute for Social Security.

On 21 October 2022, Marina Calderone was nominated as the new Minister of Labour and Social Policies by the designated Prime Minister Meloni, and was sworn in the following day by President Sergio Mattarella.

== Conflicts of interest ==
An investigation by Il Fatto Quotidiano talks about a scandal involving the Calderone family and the private university Link, where Calderone's husband is the director. According to the article, Calderone, Italian Minister of Labour, graduated from the Link University and also taught there, but the main issue concerns the fact that the University would have been funded with the consultants' fund of which Maria Calderone was the president. This has raised concerns about possible conflicts of interest and the opaque management of funds. The article also suggests that the acquisition of the university by the "Premiata Ditta" may be linked to this scandal. In general, the scandal appears to concern the possible interaction between personal interests and public funding in relation to the management of the Link University.
