= Tullio Ferrante =

Italian politician (born 1989)

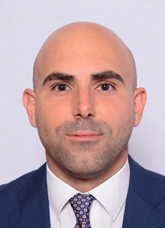
- Ferrante in 2022

Member of the Chamber of Deputies
- Incumbent
- Assumed office 13 October 2022
- Constituency: Campania 2 – 02

Personal details
- Born: 13 January 1989 (age 37)
- Party: Forza Italia

Tullio Ferrante (born 13 January 1989) is an Italian politician serving as undersecretary of the Ministry of Infrastructure and Transport since 2022. He has been a member of the Chamber of Deputies since 2022.
