= Luigi D'Eramo =

Italian politician (born 1976)

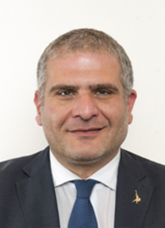
- D'Eramo in 2018

Member of the Chamber of Deputies
- In office 23 March 2018 – 12 October 2022
- Constituency: Abruzzo – P02

Personal details
- Born: 10 May 1976 (age 50)
- Party: Lega

Luigi D'Eramo (born 10 May 1976) is an Italian politician serving as undersecretary of the Ministry of Agriculture, Food Sovereignty and Forests since 2022. From 2018 to 2022, he was a member of the Chamber of Deputies.

== Biography ==
D'Eramo served as a city council member, first in Poggio Picenze from 1995 to 2004, then in Barisciano from 2004 to 2010, and finally in L'Aquila from 2007 to 2017, running as a candidate for National Alliance (Italy) before joining the La Destra party in July 2007. At the local level, he also served as councilor for tourism from 2002 to 2007 and for urban planning from 2017 to 2019 for the municipality of L’Aquila, as well as councilor for social promotion and education for the Province of L'Aquila.
