= Galeazzo Bignami =

Italian politician (born 1975)

Member of the Chamber of Deputies
- Incumbent
- Assumed office 23 March 2018
- Constituency: Emilia-Romagna

Personal details
- Born: 25 October 1975 (age 50)
- Party: FdI (2019–present)
- Other political affiliations: MSI (1989–1995); AN (1995–2009); PdL (2009–2013); FI (2013–2019)

Galeazzo Bignami (born 25 October 1975) is an Italian politician of Brothers of Italy serving as a member of the Chamber of Deputies. He was first elected in the 2018 general election, and was re-elected in 2022. Since 2022, he has served as deputy minister of infrastructure and transport.
