= Francesco Paolo Sisto =

Italian politician (born 1955)

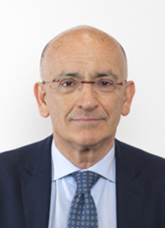
- Sisto in 2018

Member of the Senate
- Incumbent
- Assumed office 13 October 2022
- Constituency: Apulia – U02

Member of the Chamber of Deputies
- In office 29 April 2008 – 12 October 2022
- Constituency: Apulia (2008–2018); Apulia – P01 (2018–2022)

Personal details
- Born: 27 April 1955 (age 71)
- Party: Forza Italia (since 2013)

Francesco Paolo Sisto (born 27 April 1955) is an Italian politician serving as a member of the Senate since 2022. From 2008 to 2022, he was a member of the Chamber of Deputies.
