= Claudio Durigon =

Italian politician (born 1971)

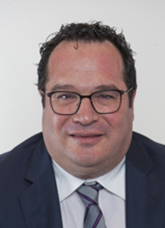
- Durigon in 2018

Member of the Senate
- Incumbent
- Assumed office 13 October 2022
- Constituency: Lazio

Member of the Chamber of Deputies
- In office 23 March 2018 – 12 October 2022
- Constituency: Lazio 2

Personal details
- Born: 10 September 1971 (age 54)
- Party: Lega (since 2017)
- Height: 1.79 m (5 ft 10 in)

Claudio Durigon (born 10 September 1971) is an Italian politician serving as a member of the Senate since 2022. From 2018 to 2022, he was a member of the Chamber of Deputies.
