= Isabella Rauti =

Italian politician

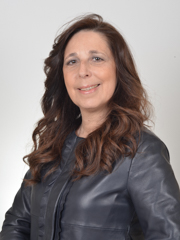

Member of the Senate of the Republic
- Incumbent
- Assumed office 23 March 2018
- Constituency: Lombardy

Personal details
- Born: 17 November 1962 (age 63) Rome, Italy
- Party: MSI (until 1995); MSFT (1995–2004); AN (2004–2009); PdL (2009–2013); FdI (since 2014)
- Spouse: Gianni Alemanno (m. 1992; div. 2018)
- Children: Manfredi (b. 1995)
- Parent: Pino Rauti (father)
- Education: Libera Università Maria SS. Assunta
- Occupation: Journalist, politician
- Military career
- Allegiance: Italy
- Branch: Italian Army
- Service years: 2016 - today
- Rank: Major
- Unit: Army's Selected Reserve

Isabella Rauti (born 17 November 1962) is an Italian academic, military reserve officer and politician. Since 2 November 2022, Rauti is Undersecretary of Defence and responsible for the Italian Army.

== Biography ==
Daughter of the former leader of the Italian Social Movement Pino Rauti, she graduated in Letters and in Pedagogy at the LUMSA University in Rome, later obtaining a PhD in Pedagogy.

=== Political career ===
When she was very young, she joined the Italian Social Movement. In 1995, with the end of the party, she followed her father in the far-right party Tricolour Flame, with which she ran for the office of Mayor of Rome at the 2001 local elections: she ranked sixth and was not elected. Three years later, in 2004, she joined Gianfranco Fini's National Alliance.

After AN merged into The People of Freedom, Rauti has been elected to the regional council of Lazio at the 2010 regional election, supporting the centre-right candidate Renata Polverini, who is elected President of Lazio.

With the end of PdL, Rauti joined Giorgia Meloni's right-wing party Brothers of Italy, with which she is elected to the Italian Senate at the 2018 general election, representing the single-member district of Mantua.

On 2 November 2022, Rauti took office as Undersecretary of Defence, responsible for the Italian Army, the Operation Strade Sicure, the training of civilian and military personnel, gender equality and equal opportunities, military sport activities, disability policies, the Military Corps of the Italian Red Cross and the Volunteer Nurses Corps, for relations with the Sovereign Military Order of Malta and the appointment of Defence representatives.

=== Personal life ===
Rauti has been married with former Mayor of Rome Gianni Alemanno from 1992 to 2018. The couple has a son, Manfredi, born in 1995.
