= Federico Freni =

Italian politician (born 1980)

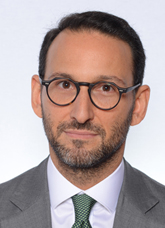
- Freni in 2022

Member of the Chamber of Deputies
- Incumbent
- Assumed office 13 October 2022
- Constituency: Lazio 1 – 07

Personal details
- Born: 1 July 1980 (age 45)
- Party: Lega (since 2021)

Federico Freni (born 1 July 1980) is an Italian politician serving as undersecretary of the Ministry of Economy and Finance since 2021. He has been a member of the Chamber of Deputies since 2022.
