= Alessandro Morelli =

Italian politician (born 1977)

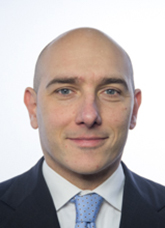
- Morelli in 2018

Member of the Senate of the Republic
- Incumbent
- Assumed office 13 October 2022
- Constituency: Lombardy

Member of the Chamber of Deputies
- In office 23 March 2018 – 12 October 2022
- Constituency: Lombardy 1

Personal details
- Born: 9 May 1977 (age 48)
- Party: Lega

Alessandro Morelli (born 9 May 1977) is an Italian politician of Lega who was elected member of the Senate in 2022. He served in the Chamber of Deputies from 2018 to 2022.
