= Free Alternative =

Free Alternative Alternativa Libera
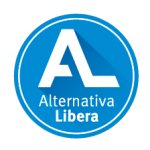
- Spokesperson: Massimo Artini
- President: Claudio Pizzuto
- Founded: January 2015
- Dissolved: 15 February 2019
- Split from: Five Star Movement
- Merged into: Italia in Comune
- Headquarters: Via della Missione 10, Rome
- Ideology: Direct democracy Environmentalism; Social democracy
- Political position: Centre-left

Free Alternative (Alternativa Libera, AL) was a political party in Italy, originally including left-wing, centrist, and right-wing elements. The party was formed in January 2015 by splinters of the Five Star Movement.

== History ==
The party was launched in January 2015 by ten deputies who had left (or had been expelled from) the Five Star Movement (M5S), a populist party which had come first in the 2013 general election, over disagreements with Beppe Grillo's and Gianroberto Casaleggio's leadership. According to AL's leader, Walter Rizzetto, at its foundation, the party counted also on seven senators (possibly including Italy Work in Progress and the X Movement), but the notion was never confirmed by the Senate's website and other news sources. Besides Rizzetto, the other main leader of the party was Massimo Artini.

In April 2015, Gessica Rostellato, one of the party's ten deputies, left in order to join the Democratic Party and, a few days later, was replaced by Toni Matarrelli, a splinter from Left Ecology Freedom, in the group.

As of mid-July 2015, the party looked divided between its left-wing, led by Artini, whose members had been crescently involved in a dialogue with Giuseppe Civati and were pondering over joining his Possible party, and its right-wing, led by Rizzetto, a conservative liberal, who had been building bridges with Lega Nord and the Brothers of Italy (FdI) instead.

In November 2015 the majority of the party (including six deputies: Artini, Matarrelli, Marco Baldassarre, Eleonora Bechis, Samuele Segoni and Tancredi Turco) joined forces with Possible and formed a joint sub-group within the Mixed Group of the Chamber. This caused the split of four deputies (Rizzetto, Sebastiano Barbanti, Mara Mucci and Aris Prodani). Shortly after, Matarrelli directly joined Possible. Through 2016 Rizzetto would join the Brothers of Italy, Barbanti the Democratic Party, and Mucci the Civics and Innovators (a split from Civic Choice), while Prodani continued to sit as an independent.

In March 2017 AL was established as a full-fledged party, with Artini spokesperson and Claudio Pizzuto president. Contextually, it severed its ties with Possible (which would form a joint group with Italian Left), while strengthening the ties with the group led by Federico Pizzarotti, mayor of Parma and M5S dissident too. In the 2017 municipal election in Parma Pizzarotti won 34.8% of the vote and his "Effect Parma" list, supported by AL and Possible, 34.6%.

On 15 February 2019 it was announced that the party would merge into Italia in Comune, another party formed by M5S splinters, under the leadership of Federico Pizzarotti.

== Leadership ==
- Spokesperson: Massimo Artini (2017–2019)
- President: Claudio Pizzuto (2017–2019)
