= X Movement =

X Movement Movimento X
- Leader: Laura Bignami
- Founded: July 2014
- Dissolved: 20 January 2021
- Split from: Five Star Movement
- Headquarters: Via Pavia, 14; 21052 Busto Arsizio (VA)
- Ideology: Populism; Direct democracy
- Political position: Big tent

Website
- progettox.it

X Movement (Movimento X, MX), later Project For – X Movement (Progetto Per - Movimento X), was a populist political party in Italy founded in 2014 by some senators expelled from the Five Star Movement. The leader of the party was the former Senator Laura Bignami, while the national spokesperson was Giampaolo Sablich, her husband and former city councilor of Busto Arsizio.

The party was inspired by the Spanish Podemos party.

MX was launched in July 2014 by four senators who had left (or had been expelled from) the Five Star Movement (M5S), a populist party which had come first in the 2013 general election, over disagreements with Beppe Grillo's and Gianroberto Casaleggio's leadership, but did not want to team up with the already-existent Italy Work in Progress.

During 2015 Bartolomeo Pepe left the party in order to join, along with Paola De Pin (another ex-M5S senator formerly affiliated to Italy Work in Progress), the Federation of the Greens, while Maurizio Romani left to join Italy of Values. Maria Mussini left later, leaving Laura Bignami as the party's only senator.

In 2021 Laura Bignami was a candidate for mayor of Busto Arstizio with the support of the X Movement, but she scored just 1.6% of the vote.

By Resolution No. 2/2021/CR of 20 January 2021 of the Italian Parliament’s Commission for Transparency and the Scrutiny of Political Parties’ Accounts, the association has been removed from the national register of recognised political parties.
