= Casaleggio =

Casaleggio may refer to:

- Casaleggio Boiro, Italian municipality of the province of Alessandria
- Casaleggio Novara, Italian municipality of the province of Novara
- Gianroberto Casaleggio (1954-2016), Italian entrepreneur and guru of Five Star Movement
- Davide Casaleggio (born 1976), Italian entrepreneur, son of Gianroberto
