= Gelsomina =

Gelsomina is the Italian equivalent of the name Jasmine. It may refer to:

- Gelsomina Verde, victim of the Camorra
- Gelsomina Vono (born 1969), Italian politician
- Gelsomina, character from the film La Strada
- "Gelsomina" (Stars Shine In Your Eyes), song by Lucienne Delyle and composed by Nino Rota, from La Strada
