= Vono =

Vono may be,

- Vono language, a nearly extinct Kainji language of Nigeria
- Gelsomina Vono (born 1969), Italian politician
- Michael Vono (born 1948), American bishop
- Vono (brand), a brand of Ajinomoto Co., Inc.
