= Riccardo Ricciardi =

Italian politician and theater director

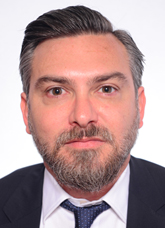

Group Leader of the Five Star Movement in the Chamber of Deputies
- Incumbent
- Assumed office 21 January 2025
- Preceded by: Francesco Silvestri

Vice President of the Five Star Movement
- Incumbent
- Assumed office 21 October 2021
- Leader: Giuseppe Conte
- Preceded by: Role established

Member of the Chamber of Deputies
- Incumbent
- Assumed office 23 March 2018
- Constituency: Toscana

Personal details
- Born: 8 May 1982 (age 44) Pietrasanta, Italy
- Party: Five Star Movement
- Spouse: Gilda Sportiello (partner)
- Children: 2
- Education: University of Pisa
- Occupation: Politician, theater director

Riccardo Ricciardi (born 8 May 1982) is an Italian politician and theater director. A member of the Five Star Movement (M5S), he has served in the Chamber of Deputies since 2018. He has been a Vice President of the Five Star Movement since 2021 and the M5S Parliamentary Leader in the Chamber of Deputies since January 2025.

== Early life and education ==
Born in Pietrasanta and raised in Massa, Ricciardi graduated with a degree in Literature and Philosophy from the University of Pisa in 2006. Outside of politics, he works as a theater director and has collaborated with notable figures such as Ilaria Cucchi, Francesco De Gregori, Piergiorgio Odifreddi, and Piercamillo Davigo.

Ricciardi is in a relationship with fellow M5S deputy Gilda Sportiello; they have two children. In 2023, Sportiello became the first member of the Italian Parliament to breastfeed in the chamber at Palazzo Montecitorio.

== Political career ==
=== Early involvement ===
In 2007, Ricciardi joined the "Amici di Beppe Grillo" meet-up groups, participating in the early "V-Day" protests that led to the foundation of the Five Star Movement (M5S).

In 2013, he ran for Mayor of Massa, receiving 12.01% of the vote. While not elected mayor, he served as a city councilor in the opposition until 2018.

=== Election to the Chamber of Deputies ===
In the 2018 general election, Ricciardi was elected to the Chamber of Deputies. During the XVIII Legislature, he served as the deputy whip of the M5S parliamentary group from 2019 to 2021. Within the movement, he is considered a representative of the party's left-leaning wing, often aligned with former Speaker Roberto Fico.

In May 2020, Ricciardi gained significant media attention for a parliamentary speech criticizing the healthcare model of the Lombardy region during the COVID-19 pandemic. His remarks sparked a heated confrontation in the chamber with members of the Lega.

On 21 October 2021, Giuseppe Conte appointed him as one of the Vice Presidents of the M5S.

=== Re-election and Leadership ===
Ricciardi was re-elected in the 2022 general election for the Tuscany constituency.

On 21 January 2025, Ricciardi was elected as the Leader (Capogruppo) of the Five Star Movement in the Chamber of Deputies, succeeding Francesco Silvestri.
