= Walter Rizzetto =

Italian politician (born 1975)

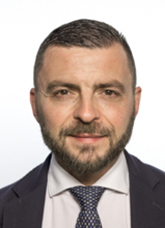
- Rizzetto in 2018

Member of the Chamber of Deputies
- Incumbent
- Assumed office 15 March 2013
- Constituency: Friuli-Venezia Giulia

Personal details
- Born: 27 June 1975 (age 50)
- Party: Brothers of Italy

Walter Rizzetto (born 27 June 1975) is an Italian politician of Brothers of Italy serving as a member of the Chamber of Deputies. He was first elected in the 2013 general election, and was re-elected in 2018 and 2022. Until 2015, he was a member of the Five Star Movement, and later joined Free Alternative and founded Our Land, before joining Brothers of Italy in 2016. Since 2022, he has chaired the Labour Committee.
