= 2017 Five Star Movement leadership election =

Italian political party leadership election

- 21–22 September 2017
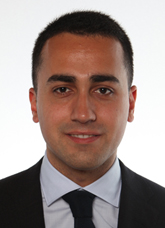

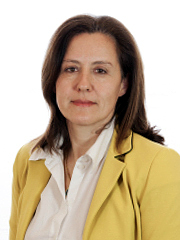
Nominee	Luigi Di Maio	Elena Fattori
Party	Five Star Movement	Five Star Movement
Popular vote	30,936	3,596
Percentage	82.6%	9.6%
Leader before election
Beppe Grillo
Elected leader
Luigi Di Maio

The 2017 Five Star Movement leadership election was an Italian online primary election held on 21 September 2017 that determined the M5S candidate to the premiership for the 2018 Italian general election.

After the election, 31-year-old Luigi Di Maio was elected candidate to the premiership and political head of the movement.

== Background ==
The party's leader Beppe Grillo would campaign in the 2018 election, but he would not be the candidate for the position of Prime Minister, even if many critics accused him of being – in case of an electoral win – the de facto head of the government. The Vice President of the Chamber of Deputies Luigi Di Maio, was widely considered as the "front runner" and the most likely candidate for the premiership of Italy.

Luigi Di Maio had been often labeled as the most pragmatic and "institutional", but also the less populist, Five Star politician; he is the son of a member of the neo-fascist Italian Social Movement and he is considered the leader of the moderate and "governmental" faction of the movement.

No other leading members of the M5S, such as Alessandro Di Battista (a populist politician, personal friend of Di Maio) or Roberto Fico (leader of the M5S left-wing faction and rival of Di Maio and Di Battista), ran for the office.

Di Maio's opponents were Senator Elena Fattori (Vice President of the 9th Permanent Senate Committee) and six other city councilors. Many of them were almost unknown, leading to significant criticism from the Democratic Party, Lega Nord and Forza Italia, who considered the ballot a false primary election, with the only aim of appointing Di Maio as M5S candidate without any real challenger.

== Candidates ==
=== Major candidates ===
Portrait	Name	Most recent position	Refs
	Luigi Di Maio (1986– )	Vice President of the Chamber of Deputies (2013–incumbent) Other positions: Member of the Chamber of Deputies (2013–incumbent)	
	Elena Fattori (1966– )	Member of the Senate of the Republic (2013–incumbent) Other positions: None	

=== Other candidates ===
Name	Details and notes	Refs
Vincenzo Cicchetti	Member of the Rimini City Council	
Andrea Davide Frallicciardi	Member of the Figline Valdarno City Council	
Domenico Ispirato	Member of the Verona City Council	
Gianmarco Novi	Member of the Monza City Council	
Nadia Piseddu	Member of the Vignola City Council	
Marco Zordan	Member of the Sarego City Council	

== Results ==
Candidate	Votes	%
Luigi Di Maio	30,936	82.62%
Elena Fattori	3,596	9.60%
Nadia Piseddu	1,410	3.77%
Gianmarco Novi	543	1.45%
Marco Zordan	373	1.00%
Vincenzo Cicchetti	274	0.73%
Andrea Davide Frallicciardi	168	0.45%
Domenico Ispirato	102	0.27%
Total votes	37,442	100.0
Source: Blog di Beppe Grillo

Vote
Di Maio	82.62%
Fattori	9.60%
Piseddu	3.77%
Novi	1.45%
Zordan	1.00%
Cicchetti	0.73%
Frallicciardi	0.45%
Ispirato	0.27%
