= Our Land =

Our Land may refer to:

- Our Land (Italy), a political party
- Our Land (Ukraine), a political party
- Our Land (2006 film), a film directed by Sergio Rubini
- Our Land (2025 film), a film directed by Lucrecia Martel
