= Our Land (Italy) =

Conservative political committee in Italy

Our Land (Italian: Terra Nostra), whose complete name is Our Land – Italians with Giorgia Meloni, is a conservative political committee led by Giorgia Meloni, who is also the leader of Brothers of Italy (FdI) and Prime Minister of Italy since 22 October 2022. Established in 2015, Our Land is a parallel organisation to FdI and aims at enlarging FdI's popular base. Leading figures involved in Our Land include Giuseppe Cossiga (a former deputy of the original Forza Italia and founding member of FdI), Alberto Giorgetti (a former deputy of the new Forza Italia who was a long-time member of National Alliance, FdI's legal predecessor), and Walter Rizzetto (a former deputy of the Five Star Movement and Free Alternative).
