= Davide Casaleggio =

Italian entrepreneur and political activist

- Born: Davide Federico Dante Casaleggio; 14 January 1976 (age 50); Ivrea, Italy
- Occupations: Activist; entrepreneur
- Political party: Five Star Movement
- Website: casaleggio.it

Davide Casaleggio (born 14 January 1976) is an Italian entrepreneur and political activist, born in Milan. Also, President of the Rousseau Association and founder of Camelot.vote.

== Biography ==
Davide Federico Dante Casaleggio was born in Milan in 1976 and grew up in Ivrea.

After the death of his father Gianroberto, he became chairman of Casaleggio Associati srl, an internet and consulting company that advises on innovation strategies, and editor of Beppe Grillo's blog.

Since 2016 Casaleggio has become a prominent figure in the Five Star Movement, a party which was founded by his father along with Beppe Grillo. In the Italian context, Casaleggio has promoted the Web as a medium for political communication and participation.

His role in the Five Star Movement has become increasingly important, albeit unofficial. Like his father, he is considered the grey eminence of the movement.

He is President of the Rousseau Association that runs the Rousseau system on which the Five Star Movement members participate and vote.

In February 2018, The New York Times dedicated an article to Casaleggio, describing him as a "mystery man who runs the M5S from the shadows."

Davide, in June 2021, stepped away from the political party after a settlement. In a note, Davide criticized the situation the party found itself in, and said that "not even my father would recognize this party" as it is today.

In 2024 he wrote the book “AI Democracy. How Artificial Intelligence will rewrite politics and society".

== Sources ==
- (in Italian) Five Star Movement
- (in Italian) Personal website
