= Italy Work in Progress =

Italy Work in Progress Italia Lavori in Corso
- Leader: Francesco Campanella
- Founded: May 2014
- Dissolved: July 2015
- Split from: Five Star Movement
- Merged into: The Other Europe
- Ideology: Direct democracy
- Political position: Centre-left

Italy Work in Progress (Italia Lavori in Corso, ILC) was a centre-left political party in Italy, which has been active mainly as a sub-group within the Mixed Group of the Senate. Its leaders were Fabrizio Bocchino and Francesco Campanella.

ILC was launched in May 2014 by nine senators who had left (or had been expelled from) the Five Star Movement (M5S), a populist party which had come first in the 2013 general election, over disagreements with Beppe Grillo's and Gianroberto Casaleggio's leadership. In the following months seven senators left the party.

As of July 2015, the two remaining members of the party, Bocchino and Campanella, showed interest in joining Giuseppe Civati's Possible, along with other former M5S members from Free Alternative, but instead they chose to join The Other Europe, changing the name to their sub-group within the Senate's Mixed Group accordingly.
