= Francesco Silvestri =

Francesco Silvestri may refer to:

- Francesco Silvestri (bishop) (died 1341)
- Francesco Silvestri da Ferrara (1474–1528), theologian
- Francesco Silvestri (dramatist) (1958–2022)
- Francesco Silvestri (politician) (born 1981)
