= Santi Cappellani =

Italian politician (born 1991)

Member of the Chamber of Deputies
- In office 23 March 2018 – 12 October 2022
- Constituency: Sicily 2 – P02

Personal details
- Born: 3 January 1991 (age 35)
- Party: Democratic Party (since 2020)
- Other political affiliations: Five Star Movement (2014–2020)

Santi Cappellani (born 3 January 1991) is an Italian politician. From 2018 to 2022, he was a member of the Chamber of Deputies. He was a member of Five Star Movement group in the Chamber from 2018 to 2020, and a member of the Democratic Party group from 2020 to 2022.
