= Luca Pirondini =

Italian politician (born 1981)

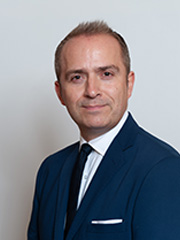
- Pirondini in 2022

Member of the Senate
- Incumbent
- Assumed office 13 October 2022
- Constituency: Liguria – P01

Personal details
- Born: 8 June 1981 (age 45)
- Party: Five Star Movement (since 2012)

Luca Pirondini (born 8 June 1981) is an Italian politician serving as a member of the Senate since 2022. From 2017 to 2022, he was a municipal councillor of Genoa.
