= Mario Turco (politician) =

Italian politician (born 1968)

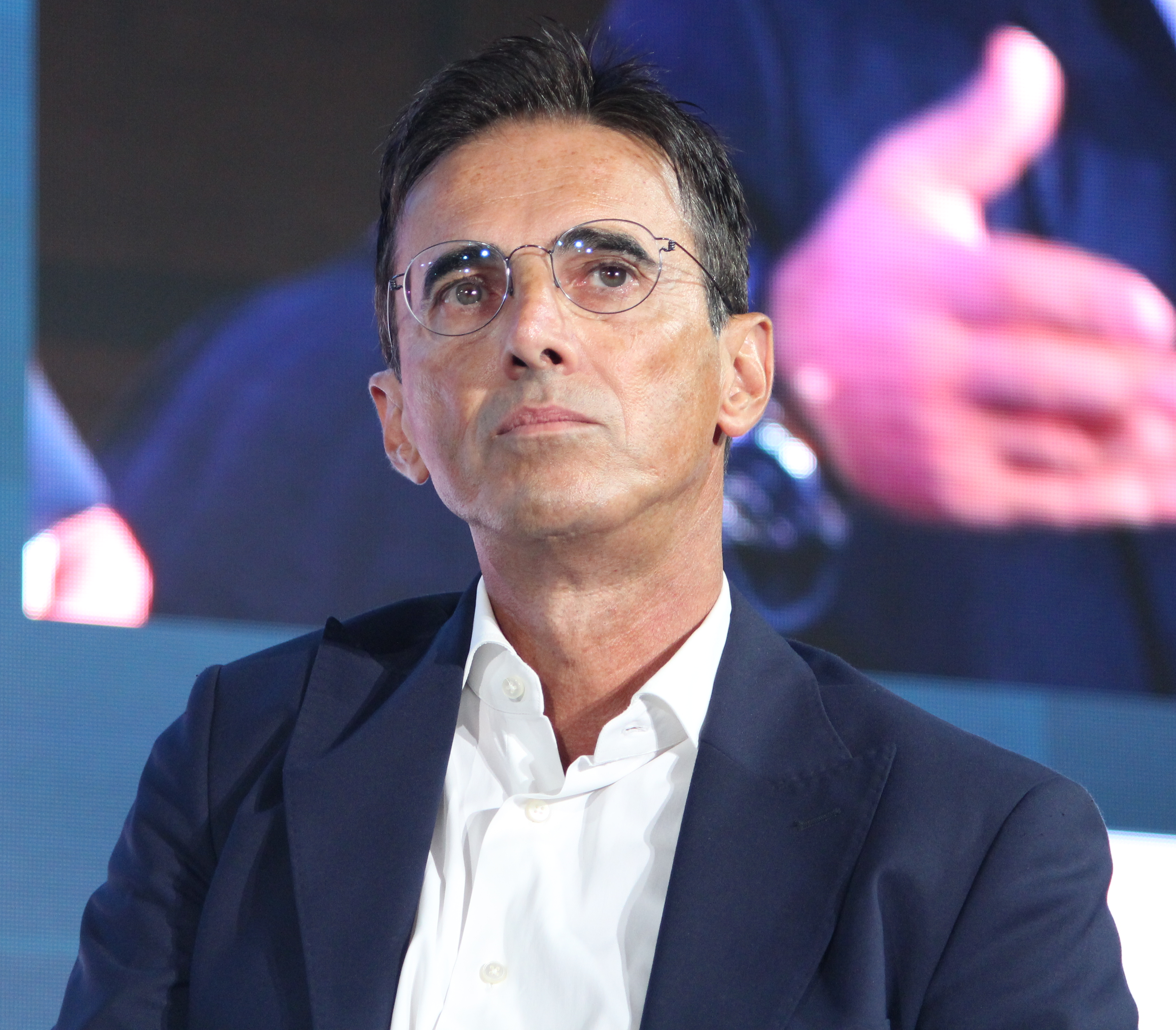
- Turco in 2024

Member of the Senate of the Republic
- Incumbent
- Assumed office 23 March 2018
- Constituency: Apulia – 07 (2018–2022); Basilicata – 01 (2022–present)

Personal details
- Born: 14 June 1968 (age 57)
- Party: Five Star Movement

Mario Turco (born 14 June 1968) is an Italian politician serving as a member of the Senate since 2018. He has served as vice president of the Five Star Movement since 2021.
