= Elena Fattori =

Italian politician from Rimini

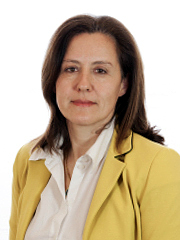

Member of the Senate of the Republic
- In office 15 March 2013 – 13 October 2022
- Constituency: Lazio

Personal details
- Born: 15 June 1966 (age 60) Rimini, Italy
- Party: M5S (2013-2019); SI (since 2021)
- Education: Sapienza University of Rome
- Profession: Biologist, politician

Elena Fattori (born 15 June 1966) is an Italian politician, member of the Italian Senate from 2013 to 2022.

She was a member of the Five Star Movement from 2013 to 2019, and stood in the 2017 Five Star Movement primary election. In 2019, she became an independent member of parliament. In February 2021, Fattori joined Italian Left.

== Biography ==
She lives in Genzano di Roma; a mother of three, she graduated with honors in biological sciences from the Sapienza University of Rome in 1989 and earned her Ph.D. in molecular biology from the Irchel University in Zurich in 1994.

After graduating, she worked extensively as a Research at the IRBM Science Park in Pomezia until 2009.
