= Robots Will Steal Your Job, but That's OK =

2012 book by Federico Pistono

- Book cover
- Author: Federico Pistono
- Subject: Technology, Economics, Artificial Intelligence
- Genre: Non-fiction
- Publisher: CreateSpace
- Publication date: February 21, 2012
- Publication place: United States
- Media type: Print (softcover)
- Pages: 215
- ISBN: 978-1479380008
- LC Class: T173.8

Robots Will Steal Your Job, but That's OK: How to Survive the Economic Collapse and Be Happy is a book by American author Federico Pistono that was published in 2012. Initially self-published, it was later picked up by publishers internationally and translated in six languages. It became a best-seller on Amazon.com and was well-received by critics.

== Content ==
The book's four points are:

1. Technology is improving at an exponential rate, robots and algorithms will soon be able to replace most human labor;
2. There is no need for the emergence of artificial general intelligence to create structural technological unemployment and destabilize the economy as we know it;
3. Work and happiness have a correlation, but not necessarily a causation. What drives happiness is having a sense of purpose and being in a state of flow, which may come from activities outside of traditional work;
4. While it is theoretically possible to replace lost jobs, the book suggests that it would be impractical and it represents a missed opportunity for society, challenging the reader to think of a system where automation allows to break the labor-by-income, income-for-survival cycle, scaling back on conspicuous consumption.

The book is divided into three parts: Automation and Unemployment, Work and Happiness, and Solution. It contains 21 chapters, two appendices, titled "How a Family Can Live Better by Spending Smart" and "Growth".

== Publication history ==
Initially self-published, it was later picked up by publishers internationally and translated in six languages.

== Reception ==
The book became a best-seller on Amazon.com, and was covered in various publications such as the BBC, the Financial Times and Época.

The Financial Times noted that the book is Johann Rupert's favorite, who stated "How is society going to cope with structural unemployment? ... Because the next wave of unemployment will be even bigger than the current one ... You don't believe me? I urge you to look at this [book]."

Piero Scaruffi in the Institute for Ethics and Emerging Technologies said: "The book's breadth is impressive: its chapters touch on Economics, Sociology, Philosophy, Morality and Artificial Intelligence, and sometimes within the same paragraph. ... Pistono is trying to construct a future society in which humans will be happy even though they will be less necessary. Instead of an apocalyptic view of the future, Pistono is the rare prophet with a Panglossian view of the future."

Peter Diamandis, in a conversation with Robert Reich at The Wall St. Journal CIO Network said, "I love the book ... the notion is that we're moving into a world where there's going to be a disconnect between work and living and I think society is going to have to find some new balance points ... we're going to be fundamentally changing society, and the question is, maybe people don't have jobs."

In a review in the Socialist Standard, the book is described as "[a]t best, this book is a useful primer to introduce people to the concept of incoming and widespread technological unemployment. It is hampered by its lack of detail in explaining the debates around the issue and its abject failure to present anything like a sensible response. At its best, it is a heartfelt tract, with some useful facts and bibliography."

== See also ==
- Post-scarcity economy
- Technological unemployment
