= Francesco Silvestri (politician) =

Italian politician (born 1981)

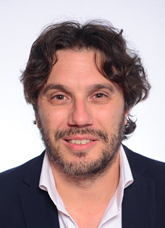
- Silvestri in 2022

Member of the Chamber of Deputies
- Incumbent
- Assumed office 23 March 2018
- Constituency: Lazio 1 – 03 (2018–2022); Lazio 1 – 03 (2022–present)

Personal details
- Born: 8 April 1981 (age 45)
- Party: Five Star Movement

Francesco Silvestri (born 8 April 1981) is an Italian politician serving as a member of the Chamber of Deputies since 2018. From 2022 to 2025, he served as group leader of the Five Star Movement.
