= Gelsomina Vono =

Italian politician (born 1969)

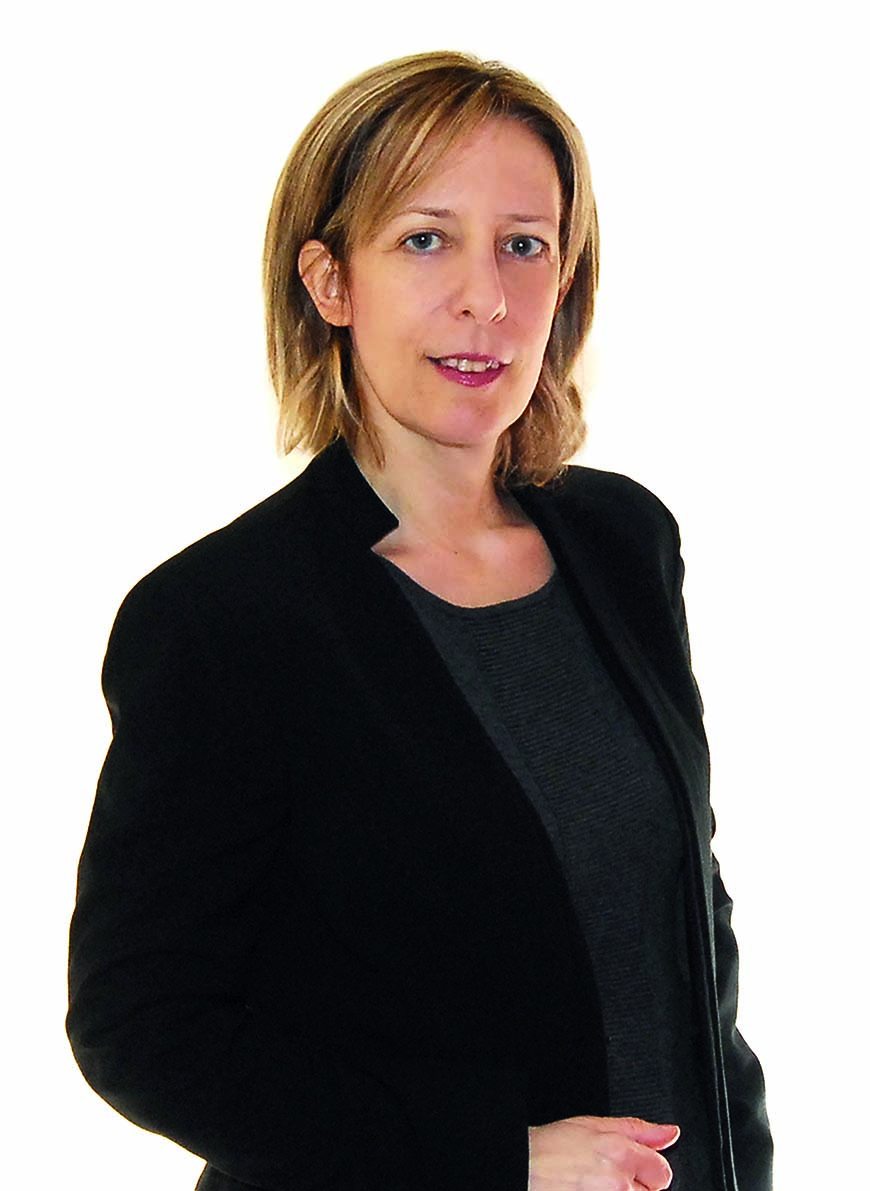
- Vono in 2018

Member of the Senate
- Incumbent
- Assumed office 23 March 2018
- Constituency: Calabria

Personal details
- Born: 14 March 1969 (age 57) Catanzaro, Calabria, Italy
- Party: Forza Italia (since 2022); IV (2019–2022); M5S (2018–2019)
- Profession: Politician

Gelsomina Vono, known as Silvia (born 14 March 1969) is an Italian politician and member of the Senate of the Republic.

== Early life ==
Vono was born in Catanzaro.

== Political career ==
In the 2018 Italian general election, Vono was elected as a member of the Five Star Movement. On 25 September 2019, she joined Matteo Renzi's Italia Viva.

On 21 January 2022, on the eve of the 2022 Italian presidential election, she left Italia Viva to join Forza Italia, criticizing the attitude of her former party for the regional elections in Calabria of the previous October and for the imminent presidential election.
