= Five Star Movement =

Italian political party

Five Star Movement Movimento 5 Stelle
- Abbreviation: M5S
- President: Giuseppe Conte
- Founders: Beppe Grillo; Gianroberto Casaleggio
- Founded: 4 October 2009; 17 years ago
- Headquarters: Via Campo Marzio 46, Rome
- Newspaper: Il Blog di Beppe Grillo (2009–2018); Il Blog delle Stelle (2018–2021)
- Youth wing: Youth Network
- Membership (2024): ▲170,000
- Ideology: Populism; Green politics
- Political position: Syncretic (leaning to the left-wing since 2022)
- National affiliation: Centre-left coalition (officially since 2026) (Note: Despite being associated with the Centre-left coalition also before 2026, the party found an agreement with other parties to form the coalition only in 2026)
- European affiliation: Five Star Direct Democracy (2019)
- European Parliament group: EFDD (2014–2019); Non-Inscrits (2019–2024); The Left (since 2024)
- Colors: Yellow
- Chamber of Deputies: 48 / 400
- Senate: 26 / 205
- European Parliament: 8 / 76
- Regional Councils: 53 / 896
- Conference of Regions: 2 / 21

Website
- movimento5stelle.eu
- Politics of Italy; Political parties; Elections; A: The M5S has been described in news sources as both far-left and far-right, despite its rejection of the traditional left–right divide. Under Conte's leadership, the M5S started to identify as "progressive", but still alternative to the left-right schema. Anyway, some observers have recently noted its shift from a catch-all towards a left-wing stance.

The Five Star Movement (Italian: Movimento 5 Stelle [moviˈmento ˈtʃiŋkwe ˈstelle], M5S) is a political party in Italy, led by Giuseppe Conte. It was launched on 4 October 2009 by Beppe Grillo, a political activist and comedian, and Gianroberto Casaleggio, a web strategist. The M5S has primarily been described as a big-tent party, as well as populist of the syncretic kind, due to its long-time indifference to the left–right political spectrum, although it has also been variously considered as left-wing or right-wing populist. The party has been a proponent of green politics and direct democracy; since 2022, it has started a shift toward the political left and also espoused social-democratic and progressive policies. Furthermore, following an online vote held in November 2024, party members themselves decided to identify as "independent progressives".

In the 2013 general election, the M5S obtained 25.6% of the vote, but rejected a proposed coalition government with the centre-left Democratic Party (PD) and joined the opposition. In 2016 M5S' Chiara Appendino and Virginia Raggi were elected mayors of Turin and Rome, respectively. The M5S supported the successful "no" vote in the 2016 constitutional referendum. In the 2018 general election, the M5S, led by Luigi Di Maio, became the largest party with 32.7% and successfully formed a government headed by M5S-backed independent Giuseppe Conte together with the League. After the 2019 government collapsed, the party formed a new government with the PD, with Conte remaining prime minister until the 2021 government crisis, which resulted in the formation of the Draghi government. Since 2019 the M5S has occasionally sided with the centre-left coalition in regional and local elections, but not yet in general elections. In the 2022 general election, the party suffered a substantial setback, was reduced to 15.4% and joined the opposition to the Meloni government. In the 2024 Sardinian regional election, M5S' Alessandra Todde was elected president of Sardinia, the party's first regional president, at the head of a centre-left coalition.

From the establishment of the association named Five Star Movement until 2021, Grillo formally served as president, his nephew Enrico Grillo as vice president and his accountant Enrico Maria Nadasi as secretary. In 2014 Grillo appointed a five-strong directory, composed of Di Maio, Alessandro Di Battista, Roberto Fico, Carla Ruocco and Carlo Sibilia, which lasted only a few months as Grillo proclaimed himself the political head of the M5S. Grillo was succeeded as political head by Di Maio, who won the 2017 leadership election with 82% of the vote, and was appointed guarantor instead. In the run-up of the 2018 general election, Grillo separated his own blog, which was used as the party's online newspaper, with the brand-new Blog delle Stelle. After the 2021 leadership election, a new party statute was approved and Conte became the new president, while Grillo continued as guarantor. The M5S has undergone several splits since its formation, including Alternative, Environment 2050 and Di Maio's Together for the Future, as well as several individual members, notably including Di Battista. In late 2024 the party held a "constituent assembly", during which it was chiefly decided to remove the role of guarantor, thus sidelining Grillo, who challenged the decision, but eventually lost.

From 2014 to 2017, the M5S was a member of the EFDD group in the European Parliament, along with the UK Independence Party and minor Eurosceptic parties. In January 2017, M5S members voted in favour of Grillo's proposal to join the ALDE Group, but the party was eventually refused and continued to sit among non-attached members, until joining The Left following the 2024 European Parliament election.

== History ==
=== Meetups ===
On 16 July 2005, Beppe Grillo suggested through his blog that supporters adopt social networks, such as Meetup, to communicate and coordinate local meetings. The first "40 Friends of Beppe Grillo" meetups began with the initial aim to "have fun, get together, share ideas and proposals for a better world, starting from one's own city, and discuss and develop my posts, if you believe them". Meetups featured thematic working groups on topics entitled "technology and innovation", "press-communication", "ethical consumerism", "currency study", "no incinerators", and others. From these beginnings, Grillo was asked to stand in the October 2005 centre-left coalition primaries for the selection of the prime ministerial candidate of The Union.

On three occasions (17 December 2005 in Turin, 26 March 2006 in Piacenza, and 16 to 18 June 2006 in Sorrento), the representatives of the Friends of Beppe Grillo meetups held national meetings with Grillo, where proposals regarding environmental issues such as the replacement of polluting incinerators with systems applying mechanical-biological waste treatment were discussed.

During the fourth national meeting held in Genoa on 3 February 2007, Grillo announced his desire to provide an autonomous space during his touring shows for local meetup activists. On 14 July 2007, some civic list representatives who participated in local elections the previous spring met in Parma to establish a national coordination between associations, movements, and organisations. They met to practice promoting and experimenting with direct and participatory democracy, and to share a document of intent, which included the establishment of proposals, abrogative referendums, the direct election of the Ombudsman, the institution of participatory budgeting, a bound mandate for public administrators, and open primaries.

=== V-Days ===
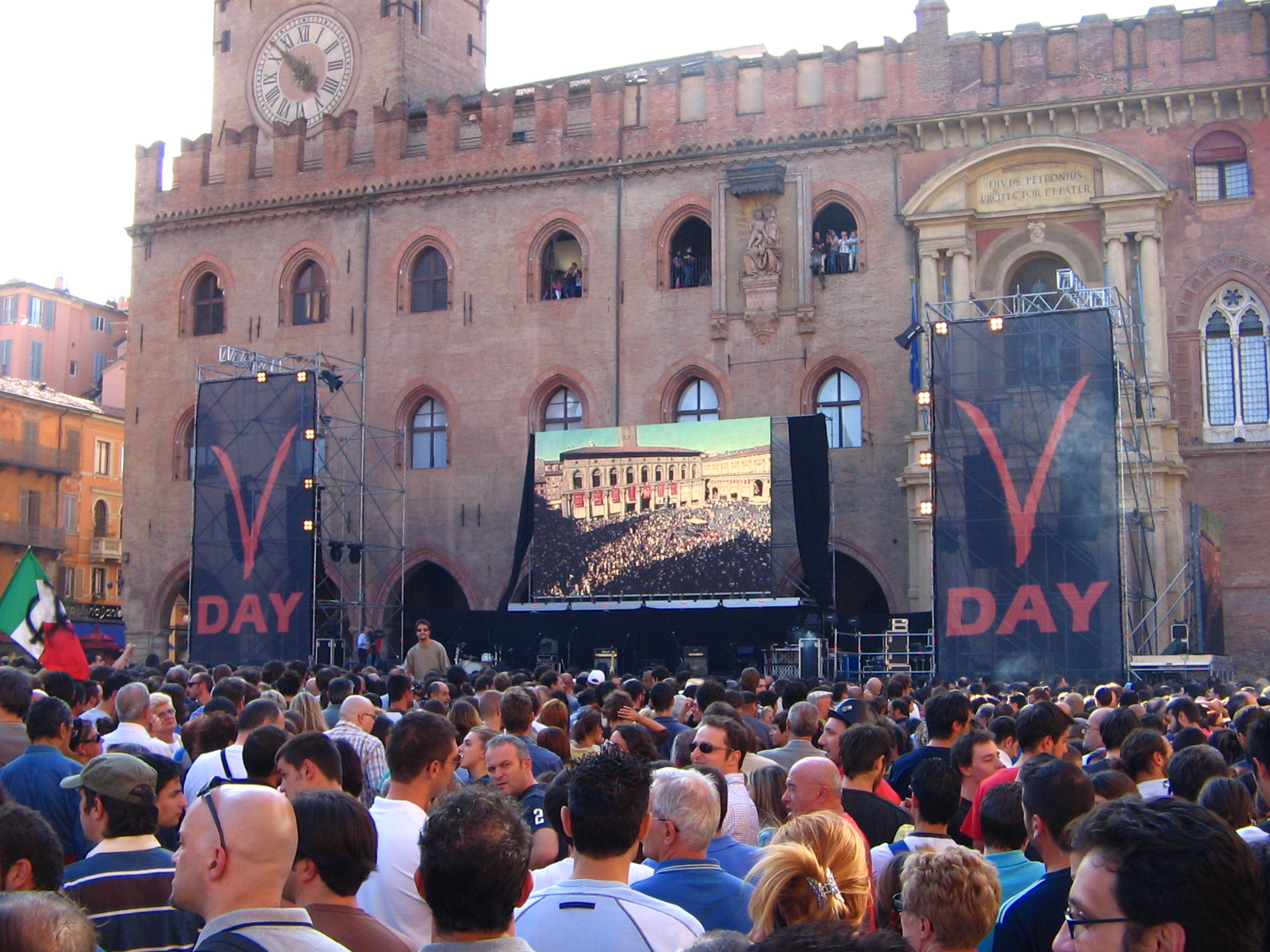
V-Day in Bologna, 2007

On 14 June 2007, Grillo launched Vaffanculo Day (Fuck-off Day), or V-Day, in Bologna. V-Day was meant to mobilise the collection of signatures to submit a popular initiative seeking to introduce preferences in the current electoral law and to prevent parliamentary candidate nominations for the criminally convicted and those who have already completed two terms in office.

The name V-Day was chosen to reflect four references. The first refers to the Normandy landings of the Allies in Normandy during World War II to symbolise how Italian citizens would invade bad policy. The second refers to the motion picture and graphic novel V for Vendetta, which the M5S frequently relates with its principles of political renewal (the logo of the movement shares the use of a red V symbol with the franchise). The third refers to the interjection vaffanculo ("fuck you") directed at bad policy, while the fourth is a reference to the Roman numeral for five.

V-Day, which continued the "Clean Parliament" initiative promoted by Grillo since 2006, took place in many Italian cities on 8 September 2007 to evoke the state of confusion caused by the Badoglio Proclamation on 8 September 1943. On that day, 336,000 signatures were collected, far exceeding the 50,000 required to file a popular initiative law. For the occasion, Michele Serra coined the term grillismo.

V2-Day was organised for 25 April 2008, a second day of action aimed at collecting signatures for three referendums. On 29 and 30 September 2007 in Lucca, several members of the meetups and local civic lists, in the initial wake of the discussions started on the net and in the wake of the previous meeting of Perugia, defined the policies for the establishment of civic lists. On 10 October 2007, Grillo gave guidance on how to create the civic lists.

=== Five Star Civic Lists ===
On 3 December 2008, Grillo presented the symbol of the Five Star Civic Lists for the 2009 local elections. The logo in the V of citizenship is a reference to V-Day. On 17 February 2009 in Bologna, a gathering of civic lists discussed the future of the movement and the coming elections. In particular, Sonia Alfano consulted with the activist base of the movement about her possible candidacy for the European Parliament as an independent candidate with the Italy of Values (IdV) list. She became the first Member of the European Parliament (MEP) from the M5S.

On 8 March 2009, the first national meeting of the Five Star Civic Lists was held in Florence, where Grillo presented the Charter of Florence, a 12-point program of the various local civic lists in the afternoon. About twenty local groups presented their ideas and experiences. In April 2009, Grillo announced he had received a letter from Nobel Prize winner in economics Joseph Stiglitz in which he declared he would look carefully at the experience of local civic lists promoted through the blog.

On 29 March 2009, Grillo announced that in the upcoming 2009 European Parliament election in Italy he would support Luigi de Magistris and Sonia Alfano (figures close to the movement) as independent candidates in the lists of IdV, together with the journalist Carlo Vulpio (also close to the movement). On 11 June, De Magistris and Alfano, candidates in all five constituencies, were elected to the European Parliament, resulting in the first and second preferences (of 419 000 and 143 000). In the same election, as stated by Grillo, 23 councillors were elected from the Five Star Civic Lists, especially in the municipalities of Emilia-Romagna in North Italy.

On 9 September 2009, the launch of the National Five Star Movement (M5S), inspired by the ideologies of the Charter of Florence, was announced. On 4 October 2009, Grillo, along with Gianroberto Casaleggio, Grillo declared the birth of the M5S and presented a programme at the Emerald Theatre in Milan.

=== 2010–2012 regional and local elections ===
During the 2010 Italian regional elections, the M5S obtained notable results in the five regions where it ran a candidate for president, as Giovanni Favia gained 7.0% of the vote in Emilia-Romagna (6.0% for the list, with two regional councillors elected); Davide Bono 4.1% in Piedmont (3.7%, two councillors); David Borrelli 3.2% in Veneto (2.6%, no councillors); Vito Crimi 3.0% in Lombardy (2.3%, no councillors); and Roberto Fico 1.3% in Campania (1.3%, no councillors).

In the 2011 Italian local elections on 15 and 16 May, the M5S was present in 75 of the 1,177 municipalities in the vote, including 18 of the 23 provincial capitals called to vote. In the first round, the M5S entered its representatives in 28 municipalities (for a total of 34 elected councillors) and often resulting in some important decisive ballots. Its best results were in the cities and towns of the center-north, especially in Emilia-Romagna, where the list achieved a share of the vote of between 9% and 12% in Bologna, Rimini, and Ravenna), and Piedmont. In Southern Italy, it rarely obtained 2% of the vote.

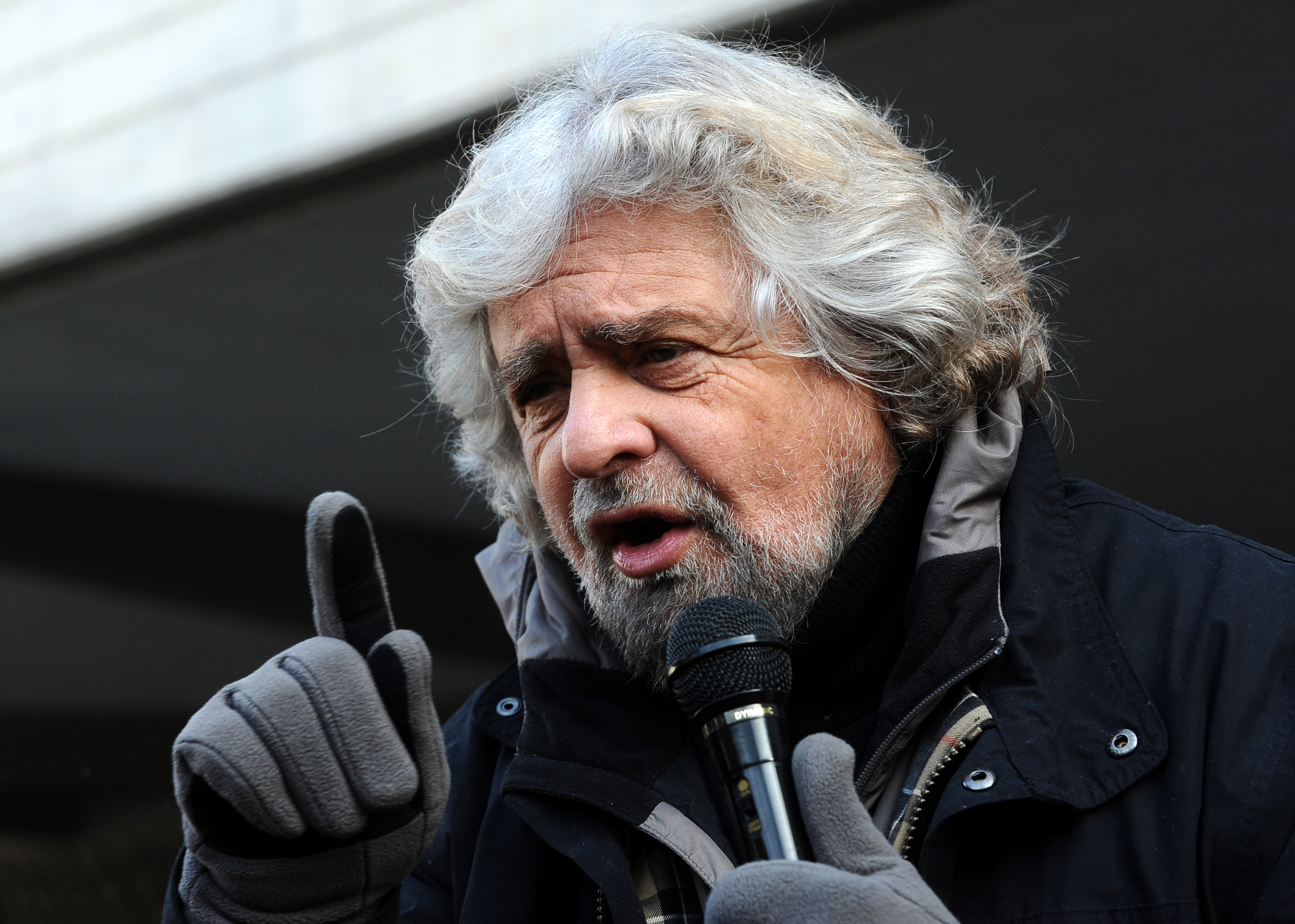
Beppe Grillo in Trento during the 2013 electoral campaign

In the 2011 Molise regional election on 16 and 17 October, the M5S had its own candidate for the presidency and its own list. The list received 2.27% of the votes and the presidential candidate garnered 5.60% of the vote, but the movement achieved no seats.

In the 2012 Italian local elections, the M5S did well in several cities of the Northern Italy, notably in Genoa (14.1%), Verona (9.5%), Parma (19.9%), Monza (10.2%), and Piacenza (10.0%). In the small Venetian town of Sarego, the M5S's candidate was elected mayor with 35.2% of the vote (there is no run-off in towns with less than 15,000 inhabitants). In the run-offs, it won the mayorships of Parma (60.2%), Mira (52.5%), and Comacchio (69.2%). After the election, the M5S consistently scored around 15–20% nationally in opinion polls, frequently ahead of the centre-right The People of Freedom (PdL) and second to the centre-left Democratic Party (PD).

In the 2012 Sicilian regional election on 28 October, the M5S fielded Giancarlo Cancelleri as candidate. The campaign kicked off with Grillo's arrival in Messina on 10 October swimming from the mainland. In the election, Cancelleri came third with 18.2% of the vote, while the M5S was the most voted for party at 14.9%, obtaining 15 seats out of 90 in the Sicilian Regional Assembly in a very fragmented political landscape; however, the election was characterised by low participation as only 47.4% of eligible voters turned out to vote.

=== 2013 general election ===
On 29 October 2012, Grillo announced guidelines for candidates wishing to stand in the 2013 general election. For the first time in Italy, the candidates were chosen by party members through an online primary, which took place 3 to 6 December. On 12 December 2012, Grillo expelled two leading members from the party (Giovanni Favia, regional councillor of Emilia-Romagna, and Federica Salsi, municipal councillor in Bologna) for breaking the party's rules. The former had talked about the lack of democracy within the party while the latter had taken part in a political talk show on Italian television, something that was discouraged and later forbidden by Grillo.

On 22 February 2013, a large crowd of 800,000 people attended Grillo's final rally before the 2013 general election in Piazza San Giovanni in Rome. On 24 and 25 February 2013, the M5S contested all Italian constituencies; Grillo was listed as head of the coalition, although he was not an electoral candidate. The vote for M5S in the Chamber of Deputies reached 25.55% of the vote in Italy and 9.67% for overseas voters, a total of 8,784,499 votes, making it the second most voted-for list after the PD, which acquired 25.42% of the votes in Italy and 29.9% abroad, or 8,932,615 votes, electing 108 deputies. The M5S vote for the Senate of the Republic was 23.79% in Italy and 10% abroad, a total of 7,375,412 votes, second only to the PD, which garnered 8,674,893 votes, electing 54 senators. The party gained a higher share of the vote than was predicted by any of the opinion polls. The M5S won 25.6% of the vote for the Chamber of Deputies, more than any other single party; however, both the centre-left coalition (Italia. Bene Comune) dominated by the PD, and the PdL-led centre-right coalition, obtained more votes as coalitions. The M5S was the largest party in the Abruzzo, Marche, Liguria, Sicily, and Sardinia regions.

On 21 March 2013, Luigi Di Maio was elected vice-president of the Chamber of Deputies with 173 votes. Aged 26, he was the youngest vice-president of the house to date.

=== 2014 European Parliament election ===
Competing in its first European election, with a surge in popularity in February 2013, the M5S won second place at the 2014 European Parliament election held on 26 May, receiving 21.15% of the vote and returning 17 MEP.

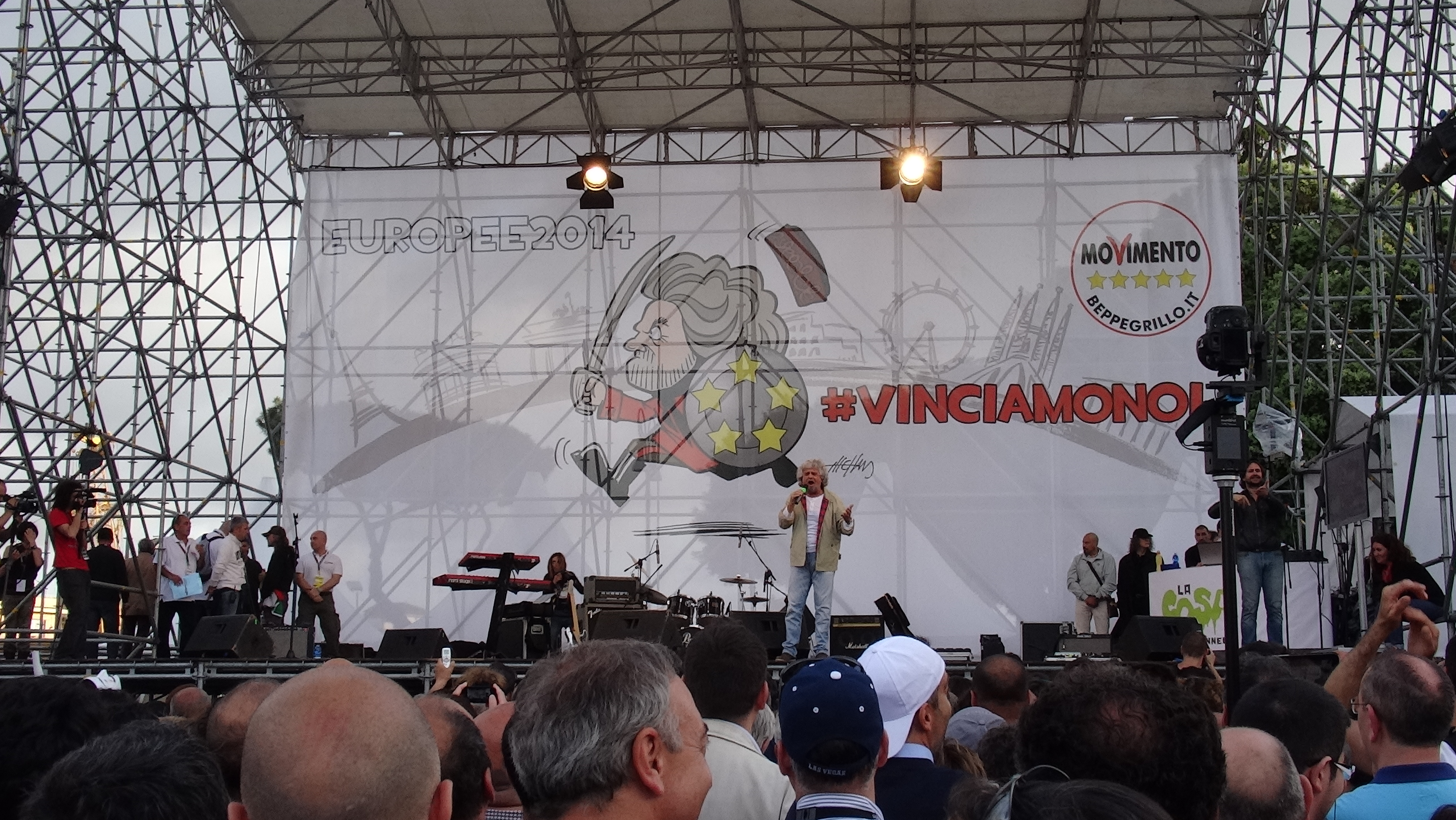
Grillo addressing the crowd in Rome, 2014

In the run-up to the Eighth European Parliament term, the M5S lacked a European affiliation and sought a European parliament group. Initial negotiations were held with Europe of Freedom and Democracy (EFD) co-president Nigel Farage and The Greens–European Free Alliance (Greens/EFA). On 4 June 2014, The Greens/EFA rejected Grillo's attempts to obtain group membership. On 11 June 2014, the Alliance of Liberals and Democrats for Europe (ALDE) group rejected the M5S as a potential affiliate in a statement citing the party's perceived Euroscepticism and populism. In an online referendum offered to M5S members on 12 June 2014, the choice of European Parliament affiliation offered were Europe of Freedom and Democracy (EFD), the European Conservatives and Reformists (ECR), or to become Non-Inscrits. Party activists voted 78.1% to join the EFD group. On 18 June 2014, it was announced that the EFD group had enough MEPs to continue into the 8th European Parliament term. On 24 June 2014, M5S MEP David Borrelli was chosen as the group's new co-president and the EFD group name was amended to Europe of Freedom and Direct Democracy (EFDD) for the upcoming parliament. The EFDD group lost its official group status on 16 October 2014 after the defection of Latvian MEP Iveta Grigule until Polish MEP Robert Iwaszkiewicz joined the group four days later.

On 17 November 2015, after an online poll in which 40,995 people took part, the movement changed its logo to replace the URL of co-founder Grillo (beppegrillo.it) with the official movement URL. The other option was to remove Grillo's URL entirely, replacing it with nothing. The grounds for the removal of Grillo's name was that "the 5 Star Movement is mature enough and is preparing to govern Italy, so I believe it's correct not to associate it to a name anymore".

=== Gianroberto Casaleggio's death ===
The movement's founder and main strategist Gianroberto Casaleggio died on 12 April 2016 in Milan, at the age of 61, after a long period of illness due to brain cancer. After his death, his son Davide was appointed as the president of Casaleggio Associati and took his father's office as leader and strategist of the M5S.

=== 2018 general election ===
For the 2018 general election, the M5S presented a programme whose main points are the introduction of a citizens' income, to fight poverty, a measure that would cost between €15 and €20 billion annually, plus the cut of the public debt by 40 points in relation to GDP in ten years, the adoption of measures to revitalise youth employment, a cut in pensions of over €5,000 net not entirely based on the contribution method, the reduction of IRPEF rates and the extension of the income tax threshold, and the increase in spending on family welfare measures from 1.5 to 2.5% of GDP. On 4 March, none of the three main groupings, namely the M5S, the centre-right coalition, and the centre-left coalition led by the Democratic Party (PD), won a majority of seats in the Italian Parliament, although the M5S became the largest individual party, with 32.7% of the vote and 227 seats in the Chamber. In May, the M5S entered into coalition talks with centre-left PD, but party secretary Matteo Renzi publicly criticised and rejected the deal being discussed by his fellow party members; the M5S then turned to the League. The talks resulted in the proposal for the self-described Government of Change under the leadership of Giuseppe Conte, a law professor close to the M5S. The formation of the cabinet initially failed on 27 May as President Sergio Mattarella did not agree on the appointment of Paolo Savona as the Italian Minister of Economy and Finance due to his perceived Euroscepticism.

After the 2018 general election, the M5S started a decline in both opinion polls, deputies and senators, and election results, starting with the 2019 European Parliament election. Into the 2018 general election, the M5S proposed a constitutional law that would have obliged members of parliament to resign if they intend to change party. The M5S had won 227 deputies and 112 senators; by February 2022, the party had declined to 157 deputies and 62 senators, though it remained the biggest party in both houses of parliament. The first defections came when the deputy Andrea Mura was removed by the M5S for his abstentionism and later resigned from his duties, while the deputy Matteo Dall'Osso left the party to join Forza Italia (FI), Silvio Berlusconi's centre-right party, and the senators Saverio De Bonis and Gregorio De Falco were ejected due to their opposition to policies of the M5S–League government. Further defections came in 2019, when the deputy Sara Cunial was ejected after accusing the M5S of "favouring agromafia", the senator Paola Nugnes, who would later join the left-wing parliamentary group Free and Equal (LeU) as an independent representative of the Communist Refoundation Party (PRC), was removed from the M5S after voting against Salvini's decrees on immigration, as did the deputies Veronica Giannone and Gloria Vizzini, who opposed some of the M5S–League government's legislation, while the deputy Davide Galantino, who would later join the right-wing Brothers of Italy, left the M5S to join the Mixed Group, as did the senator Elena Fattori, who joined Italian Left (SI) in January 2021.

=== 2019 European Parliament election ===
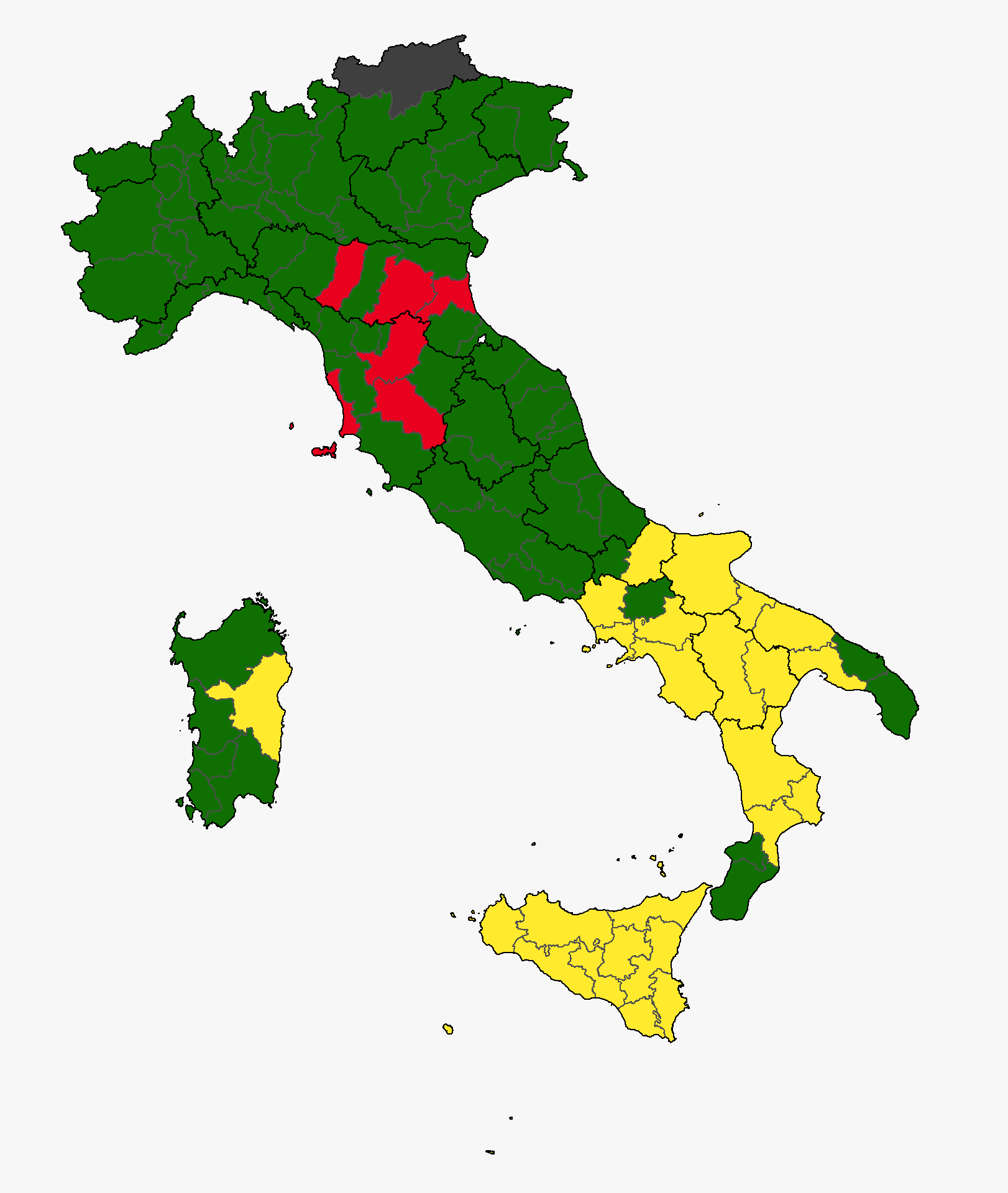
Map showing the 2019 European Parliament election result

In the 2019 European Parliament election in May, the M5S saw decline in its vote share and the number of seats held from 21.2% of the vote and 17 seats to 17.1% of the vote and 14 seats. The results were seen as a significant defeat for the party, as the League was able to surpass the M5S in terms of vote share and seats by a large margin. Additionally, the results showed the party had seen a significant decline since the 2018 general election.

After the results, Di Maio called a vote of confidence in his leadership after several officials criticised him; transparency of the Rousseau platform, the online platform used by the party, was questioned earlier on in the year. On 31 May 2019, Di Maio won the vote of confidence, with the support of 80% of 56,127 members who voted on the motion. Afterwards, Di Maio pledged to reform the party.

=== 2019 government crisis ===
In August 2019, Deputy Prime Minister Matteo Salvini announced a motion of no confidence against Prime Minister Conte after growing tensions within the majority. Many political analysts believe the no confidence motion was an attempt to force early elections to improve the League's standing in the Italian Parliament, ensuring Salvini could become the next prime minister. On 20 August, following the parliamentary debate in which he accused Salvini of being a political opportunist who "had triggered the political crisis only to serve his personal interest", Prime Minister Conte resigned his post to President Sergio Mattarella.

On 21 August, President Mattarella started the consultations with all the parliamentary groups. On the same day, the national direction of the PD officially opened to a cabinet with the M5S, based on pro-Europeanism, a green economy, sustainable development, the fight against economic inequality, and a new immigration policy. In the days that preceded the second round, a confrontation between the PD and the M5S started, while the left-wing parliamentary group LeU announced its support for a potential M5S–PD cabinet. On 28 August, the PD's newly elected secretary Nicola Zingaretti announced at the Quirinal Palace his favourable position on forming a new government with the M5S, with Conte at its head. On the same day, Mattarella summoned Conte to the Quirinal Palace for 29 August to give him the task of forming a new cabinet. On 3 September, members of the M5S voted on the Rousseau platform in favour of an agreement with the PD under the premiership of Conte, with more than 79% of votes out of nearly 80,000 voters. On 4 September, Conte announced the ministers of his new cabinet, which was sworn in at the Quirinal Palace on the following day. On 18 September, Renzi left the PD to found the centrist liberal party Italia Viva (IV); he then joined the government with IV to keep the League and Salvini out of power.

During Conte's second government, the M5S continued to suffer parliamentary defections, among them the senator Gelsomina Vono, who left the M5S to join first IV an then FI, the senator Elena Fattori, who moved to the Mixed Group and then joined SI in January 2021. while the senator Ugo Grassi, Stefano Lucidi, and Francesco Urraro joined the League. Additionally, the education ministry Lorenzo Fioramonti left the M5S to join the Mixed Group, the senator Gianluigi Paragone, who would later found the Eurosceptic Italexit party and was joined by the senators Carlo Martelli and Mario Giarrusso, was ejected for voting against the finance bill and for his lack of confidence vote to Conte's second cabinet, the deputies Nunzio Angiola and Gianluca Rospi joined the Mixed Group, as did the deputies Santi Cappellani, Massimiliano De Toma, Rachele Silvestri, Nadia Aprile, and Michele Nitti, who joined the PD, and the senator Luigi Di Marzio, while the deputy Flora Frate was expelled from the M5S for failure to return her salary.

=== 2020 leadership crisis ===
On 22 January, four days before the 2020 Italian regional elections, Di Maio resigned as party leader and was replaced ad interim by Vito Crimi. On 15 June, the conservative Spanish newspaper ABC reported that then-Foreign Minister of Venezuela Nicolás Maduro paid Gianroberto Casaleggio €3.5 million in 2010 to finance an "anticapitalist, leftist movement in the Italian Republic". Davide Casaleggio said this was fake news that had already surfaced in 2016.

=== 2021–2022 government crises ===
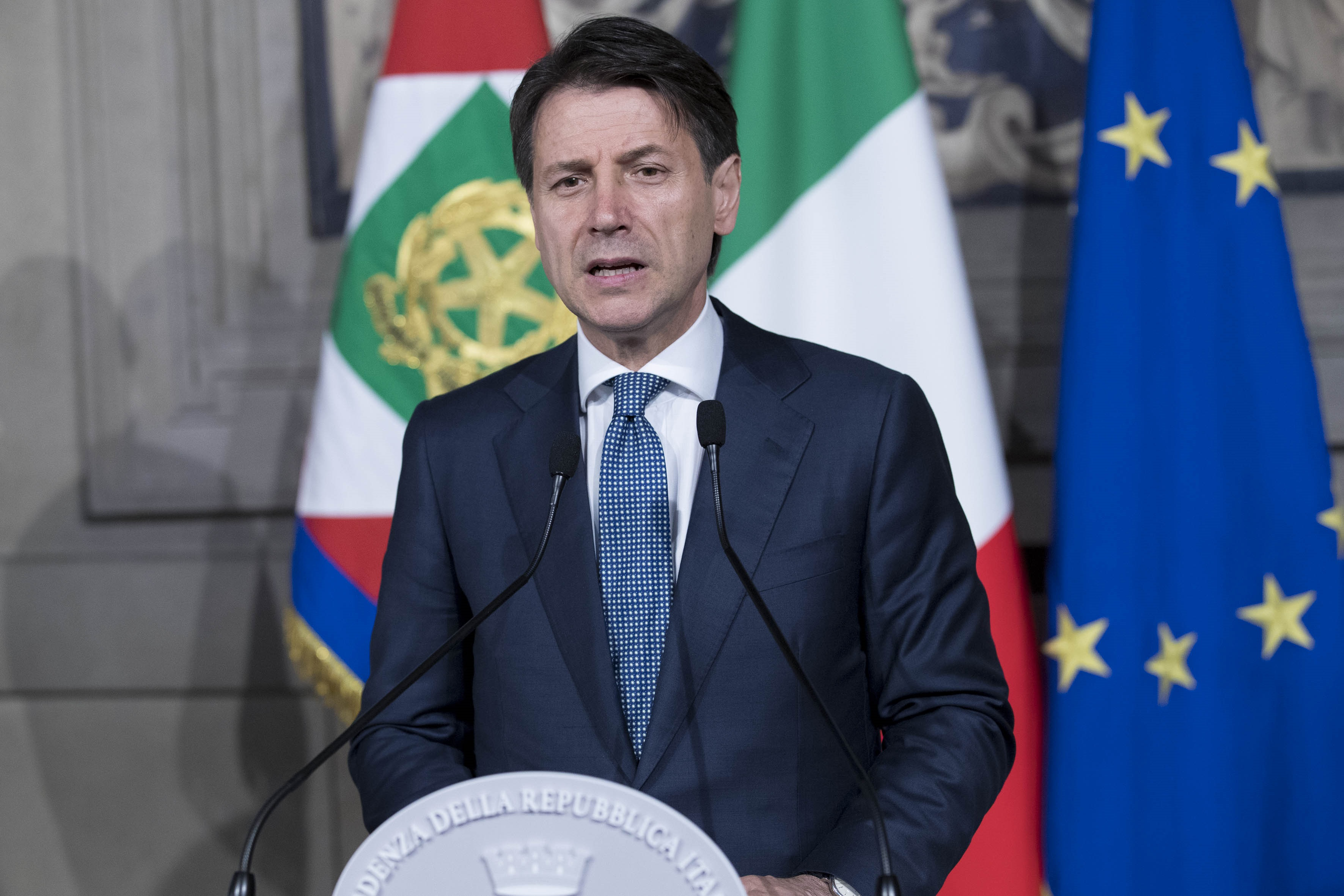
Giuseppe Conte at the Quirinal Palace

On 26 January 2021, Conte resigned as prime minister. On 11 February, registered members of the party were made to vote on whether to join a government headed by Mario Draghi government through the SkyVote platform; 59% voted in favour. The debate over whether to support the Draghi government led to a split in the party, and the party expelled parliamentarians who voted against Draghi, and would soon found Alternative, and ManifestA later in February 2022. Prominent member Alessandro Di Battista, who opposed the party's decision, left the M5S on 11 February.

On 23 April, M5S and its web platform called Rousseau separated from one another. This was mainly due to a strained relationship as many parliamentarians refused to cover costs of the Rousseau Association. This resulted on the association cutting its ties and sending its employees home on reduced pay. Additionally, disagreements between Davide Casaleggio and Conte over the latter's proposed reforms led to an increasingly strained relationship. After the separation, the M5S accused the association of interference in the party's decisions. In May 2021, Isabella Adinolfi became the eighth MEP to defect from the M5S since the 2019 European Parliament election. In July 2021, the senator Matteo Mantero left the M5S to join Power to the People.

On 6 August, after a two-day online election in which 67,064 members voted, Conte was elected president of the M5S, with 62,242 votes (93%) in favour. The M5S suffered significant losses in the 2021 Italian regional elections in October, particularly the mayor of Rome Virginia Raggi, who was decisively defeated. In November 2021, the senator Emanuele Dessì left the M5S to join the Communist Party. On 7 February 2022, the court of Naples suspended the resolutions regarding the change in the M5S statute and the election of Conte as president of the M5S. On 21 June, Di Maio announced a split over foreign policy disagreements with Conte's faction, leading the formation of the Together for the Future parliamentary group, joined by 51 deputies and 11 senators formerly of M5S.

During 2022, rumours arose around a possible withdrawal of M5S's support to the national unity government, including allegations that Draghi privately criticised Conte and asked Grillo to replace him. This came amid tension between the M5S and the Draghi government on economic, environmental, and foreign policy issues. On 12 July, Draghi stated he would resign if the M5S withdraws its support to the government. On 14 July, the M5S revoked the support to the government of national unity regarding a decree concerning economic stimulus to contrast the ongoing energy crisis, leading to a government crisis, and the collapse of Draghi's government on 21 July. Parliament was dissolved and a snap election was called for September 2022.

=== 2022 general election ===
Some early opinion polling for the 2022 Italian general election showed that the only way to avoid a right-wing alliance victory was the formation of a large big tent coalition including the M5S, minor left-wing and centrist parties, and their 2019–2021 government ally, the PD. As the M5S was blamed by the PD for causing the fall of Mario Draghi's government, an alliance was excluded from both sides, despite some pressure from the left to maintain the PD–M5S alliance. They remained allies at the regional level, such as in Liguria and Sicily, though not without criticism and issues. Under Conte's leadership in 2022, the M5S declared themselves to be part of the progressive pole and to be to the left of the PD; their campaign centered around the minimum wage and in defence of the citizens' income from right-wing criticism.

Thanks in part to a strong performance in southern Italy, the M5S defied single-digits polls in July 2022, obtained 15.4% of the vote and won several single-member constituencies in the South that otherwise would have been won by the centre-right coalition. For the first time since 2018, the M5S returned at the opposition level and voted against Giorgia Meloni's government, which had been sworn in on 22 October, in the confidence vote in both houses of the Italian Parliament on 25–26 October. Conte said he would lead an "uncompromising opposition" and added: "We will be the outpost for the progressive agenda against inequalities, to protect families and businesses in difficulty, to defend the rights and values of our Constitution."

=== 2024 regional and European Parliament elections ===
In the 2024 Sardinian regional election, former deputy minister Alessandra Todde was elected president of Sardinia at the head of a centre-left coalition including the PD, left-wing parties and regional ones. Todde was the first regional president hailing from the M5S.

In the 2024 European Parliament election, the Five Star Movement placed third, obtaining less than 10% of the vote, a result considered disappointing by Giuseppe Conte.

=== The constituent assembly and the rupture with Grillo ===
In November 2024, Giuseppe Conte called a constituent assembly in which party members were called to vote on a series of points, including placement, alliances, the abolition of the two-term limit and the abolition of the role of guarantor, held by Beppe Grillo. The final phase of the constituent assembly was held from 23 to 24 November through a kermesse called "Nova". The outcome of the vote saw the consensus for the abolition of the guarantor prevail, thus sanctioning a break between the movement and its co-founder. Grillo, exercising one of his powers provided for by the party statute, thus asked for a repeat of the vote, which was held on 8 December. However, the second vote also confirmed the outcome of the first vote, thus definitively abolishing the office held by Grillo.

== Ideology ==
The M5S was conceived as a post-ideological movement, within the context of post-modern politics, and has been described as anti-establishment, environmentalist, and populist. It has promoted left-wing issues, such as green-inspired policies, and has been compared to the anti-austerity movement in Spain, Pirate parties, and Occupy Wall Street. From 2014 to 2019, the M5S also supported some right-wing policies, especially on immigration, and has been described as a New Right or right-wing party, or also compared to the post-war populism of Guglielmo Giannini's Common Man's Front. Additionally, it has been variously described as anti-globalist, anti-immigration, big tent, Eurosceptic, and pro-Russian. Its members stress that the M5S is not a party but a movement, and the five stars in the name and logo are a reference to five key issues for the party, among them the common good, integral ecology, social justice, technological innovation, and a green economy. The M5S has promoted e-democracy, direct democracy, the principle of "zero-cost politics", degrowth, and nonviolence. Grillo himself once provocatively referred to the movement as populist. More recently, the party has been described as progressive.

In the M5S, themes are derived from ecology and anti-particracy, promoting the direct participation of citizens, who converge in the management of public affairs through forms of digital democracy, such as e-democracy. The movement wants to be a "democratic encounter outside of party and associative ties and without the mediation of directive or representational organisms, recognizing to all users of the Internet the role of government and direction that is normally attributed to a few". From the economic point of view, it embraces the theories of degrowth, supporting the creation of "green jobs", and the rejection of polluting and expensive "great works", including incinerators and high-speed rail, aiming for an overall better quality of life and greater social justice. The M5S proposes the adoption of large-scale energy projects, elimination of waste, sustainable mobility, protection of territory from overbuilding, and remote work. The movement's political discourse often refers to the Internet as a solution to many social, economic, and environmental problems. This approach bears similarities with North American cyber-utopianism and the Californian Ideology.

In December 2024, during the party's constituent assembly, its members voted to declare themselves "independent progressives", abolish the limit of two terms for its elects, eliminate the role of party's guarantor (held by Grillo), introduce a law on fine vita (euthanasia), legalise cannabis, progressively abolish cash, improve public healthcare, continue the ecological transition, and create a common European army. The definition of "independent progressives" was voted by 36.7% of participants, while the other options were "no positioning" (26.2%), "progressive force" (22.1%), "left-wing force" (11.5%) and no vote (3.4%). During the assembly, the party invited Sahra Wagenknecht of the Sahra Wagenknecht Alliance to give a speech. "The "progressive" label has been questioned by some Italian politicians due to Sahra Wagenknecht's invitation, along with the ambiguities of current and past issues, and Conte continued to define the party as "not left-wing".

=== Direct democracy ===
The movement bases its principles on direct democracy as an evolution of representative democracy. The idea is that citizens will no longer delegate their power to parties, which are considered to be old and corrupted intermediates between the state and themselves, that serve the interests of lobby groups and financial powers. They will succeed only by creating a collective intelligence made possible by the Internet.

To go in this direction, the M5S chose its Italian and European parliamentary candidates through online voting by registered members of Grillo's blog. Through an application called Rousseau reachable on the web, the registered users of M5S discuss, approve, or reject legislative proposals submitted then in Parliament by the M5S group. As an example, the M5S electoral law was shaped through a series of online votes, like the name of the M5S candidate for President of Italy. The choice to support the abolition of a law against immigrants was taken online by members of the M5S, even if the final decision was against the opinions of Grillo and Casaleggio. The partnership with the UK Independence Party was also decided by online voting, although the given options for the choice of European Parliament group for M5S were limited to Europe of Freedom and Democracy (EFD), European Conservatives and Reformists (ECR), and to stay independent (Non-Inscrits). The option of joining the Greens/EFA group was discussed, but this option was not available at the time of the voting due to that group's prior rejection of the M5S.

=== Internet ===
Andrea Ballatore and Simone Natale wrote about how digital utopianism plays a pivotal role in M5S's worldview, saying that Grillo and Casaleggio describe the web as a "transparent, unified, coherent entity", with its own logic, laws, agency and disruptive agenda. They say that the web, which acts as a mythical panacea, can, and wants to cure the social and economic ills of Italy, leading the nation towards a more prudent future. They also say that the web is described as a "supermedium", which will significantly change all political, social, informational, and organisational processes. Roberto Biorcio says that Grillo used the internet as a way for widespread dissemination of their politics consisting of two elements. The first is the idea that the people can express their feelings of vaffanculo, which literally translates as "fuck you", or "fuck off", aimed at the entirety of the political class. This was at the same time an attempt to transform protest into legitimate political action, as they gathered 450,000 signatures for three legislative initiatives created to promulgate a "clean parliament". Eric Turner stipulates that despite the Internet being promoted by Grillo as horizontal and without hierarchy, many people in Italy critique that claim as being deceiving. He quotes blogger Massimo Mantetellini by saying that the mass comments and posts created by the M5S actually create confusion and allows a top-down modality in which the leaders do not follow their own ideas and principles.

=== Environmental, economic, and social issues ===
The M5S has roots in environmentalism, as well as a left-wing stance on some major social issues. Fabio Bordignon states that the very first battles of Grillo's people had their roots relating to but not exclusively environmentalism and renewable energy, the problems of poverty and precarious employment, the battles against the power of big business and the effects of globalisation, and the morality of the political sphere and civil rights. He goes on to say that roughly about 10–15% of the laws proposed over the years are dedicated to the environment alone. Paolo Natale says that in the first years of the party's major success around 2012, the M5S was made up of mainly younger generations of people, and for the most part males who had received high levels of education as well as having left-wing political stances. He states that these people were searching for alternative ways of participating in politics besides the regular scheme of what existed, and especially to achieve good administration, high-quality public transport, and green spaces, but with sensitivity to problems linked to local crime.

To exemplify how the M5S ranks among other parties for social and environmental stances for the 2013 general election, Nicolò Conti created a chart using poll data, the various parties' individual manifestos, and how these preferences interacted and translated into a policy space that the parties contested. His results were that the M5S ranks first among other parties in welfare spending expansion, environmental protection, and market regulation, where welfare expansion meant the expansion of public social services and excludes education, environmental protection meant policies in favour of preserving/conserving the environment, and market regulation meant policies designed to create an equitable and open economic market.

The M5S supported the nationalisation of the Bank of Italy, arguing that the Italian situation was an anomaly compared to how central banks operate in other countries.

=== Anti-corruption ===
One of the most important rules of M5S is that politics is a temporary service; no one who has already been elected twice at any level (local or national) can be a candidate again and has to return to their original job. Another feature of the movement is the so-called "zero-cost politics", according to which politics must not become a career and way to make money. Belonging to the movement requires the self-reduction of the salaries of the citizens elected. The movement also rejects campaign contributions. In the 2012 regional elections, the Sicilian wing of the M5S decided to allocate the money saved by the reduction of the salaries of their elected to a fund for microcredit to help small and medium enterprises. In the 2013 general election, the M5S stated to have rejected over €42 million of public electoral refunds, supporting its expenses for the campaign with crowdfunding through the blog.

To be M5S candidates, citizens must not have a criminal record. The party also supports initiatives to ban politicians with criminal records from being elected. Among the greater political battles of M5S is the ethical commitment to a greater simplicity and transparency to counter the practice of holding two or more positions, which show the intricate conflicts of interest between any organisation, subsequently strengthened by public register, as a way to avoid centralisations that are nepotistic and clientelistic.

=== Same-sex marriage ===
On 15 July 2012, Grillo publicly expressed his support for same-sex marriage, when the subject was discussed in the PD's National Assembly. In offering his support to marriage between homosexual citizens, Grillo broke his silence on the subject; some observers had speculated he opposed same-sex marriage.

On 28 October 2014, an online referendum took place among the activists of the M5S on the recognition of same-sex civil partnerships, in which 21,360 voted in favour and 3,908 voted against. In February 2016, the M5S decided not to officially back the proposal of recognition of stepchild adoption for same-sex civil partnerships, refusing to take an official stand, and gave its parliamentarians freedom to vote their conscience on the matter.

The M5S supports the DDL Zan, an anti-homophobia law, which failed to pass in 2020. In the aftermath, the M5S defended itself from accusations by Italia Viva. On 31 March 2022, Senator Alessandra Maiorino introduced a bill to legalise same-sex marriage.

=== No alliances ===
Grillo's campaign has an unwillingness to form alliances as a result of his refusal to be associated or characterised like any of the older political families including the centre-left and centre-right coalitions. As the government itself is made up of both centre-left and centre-right coalition parties, the M5S has had difficulties coming to an agreement with any of the other parties in both 2013 and 2018, where a supportive alliance between the M5S and the centre-left coalition was discussed in both election before leading to different outcomes. Despite the different views within the party, the issues on which the movement agrees keep the party intact through advocating the main five principles of the M5S. A Tecné poll in the aftermath of the 2018 Italian general election suggested that 56% of M5S voters preferred a government coalition between M5S and the League. A coalition between the M5S and the centre-right coalition as a whole was preferred by only 4%. 22% preferred a coalition between the M5S, the centre-left coalition led by the Democratic Party (PD), and the left-wing Free and Equal (LeU). A technocratic government was only supported by 1% of the M5S's voters.

Since the formation of the left-leaning government with the PD and LeU, the M5S opened up to alliances with the centre-left coalition, such as for local and regional elections. This, among other factors, reflected poorly in opinion polling for the 2022 Italian general election, which saw a decline for the M5S in the immediate months after the election and fell to third place since the 2019 European Parliament election, to single digit-polls before the campaign. 2023 could have been the first alliance at the national level with the PD and the centre-left coalition but the fall of the Draghi government, to which both the M5S and PD belonged as national unity, caused a rift in July 2022 and led to snap elections on 25 September. As the PD blamed it on the M5S as an attempt to gain ground in the polls, while the M5S criticised the PD for not moving on from Draghi, it led to the breakdown of talks. Ultimately, the lack of alliance between the centre and the left, including an electoral law favouring coalitions, led to the win for the centre-right coalition.

On 31 October 2026, the M5S found an agreement with PD, AVS, IV, +E, PCI, and PU to form a coalition for 2027 elections.

=== Immigration ===
The M5S's position on immigration has been ambiguous. On 23 December 2016, Grillo wrote in his blog that all illegal immigrants should be expelled from Italy, that the Schengen Agreement should be temporarily suspended in the event of a terrorist attack until the threat has been removed, and that there should be revision of the Dublin Regulation. On 21 April 2017, Grillo published a piece questioning the role non-governmental organisations (NGOs) operating rescue ships off Libya are playing in the migrant crisis, asking where are they getting their money, and strongly suggesting they may be aiding traffickers. On 5 August 2017, Luigi Di Maio, who led the M5S in the 2018 general election, called for "an immediate stop to the sea-taxi service" bringing migrants to Europe.

During their 2018–2019 government with the League, the M5S approved Matteo Salvini's anti-immigration degrees, for which their future government allies, the PD, which had opposed it, criticised when the M5S declared themselves to be part of the progressive pole and to the left of the PD during the 2022 campaign. During their government with the PD in 2019–2021, the decrees were partially abolished. Conte later claimed credit, when he first signed the law, for having moderated and made them less extreme than they originally were at the time, and criticised them in an interview to the Corriere della Sera, blaming them on Salvini. In August 2022, Conte fully disowned the League.

=== Rhetoric ===
On 28 January 2014, Giorgio Sorial, a deputy of the M5S, accused President Giorgio Napolitano of being a hangman who repressed opponents. Prime Minister Enrico Letta immediately defended President Napolitano, charging the M5S with being extremists. The following day, Angelo Tofalo, another deputy of the M5S, ended his speech in the Chamber of Deputies by shouting Boia chi molla! ("[The one] who gives up [is a] hangman!"), a famous motto used by Italian (neo-)fascists. The M5S members, especially its leader Beppe Grillo, have been accused of being too vulgar and verbally violent.

A M5S demonstration inside the Chamber of Deputies against a law approved by the government, which happened in January 2014, caused a brawl between the M5S, the centrist Civic Choice, the right-wing Brothers of Italy, and the centre-left Democratic Party. Following insults to the president of the Chamber of Deputies Laura Boldrini, Italian journalist Corrado Augias stated on 31 January 2014 that the violence used by the M5S reminded him of fascism. The following day, a militant activist of the M5S burned some of Augias's books and uploaded the photos to his Facebook profile because according to him "Augias offended the movement". This episode was readily taken up by major national newspapers and heavily criticised by public opinion due to some similarities with Nazi book burnings. Grillo criticised the action, saying the person who uploaded the photos did not represent the movement.

In the 2018 general campaign, the M5S said that they would not have given public money to banks. In 2019, the M5S–League coalition government gave its consent to the possible bailout of Banca Carige's debt, consisting of an amount of up to 1.6 billion dollars, to compensate bondholders and shareholders. The M5S had previously criticised a similar bailout of Banca Monte dei Paschi di Siena approved by the Paolo Gentiloni's centre-left government.

=== European affiliation ===
Regarding the politics of the European Union and the euro, the M5S has often been highly critical but ambiguous. On 12 June 2014, having been rejected by the Greens/EFA, and also by ALDE, the M5S offered its activists a limited-choice online referendum to choose a parliamentary group for the party. 78% of participating activists voted for the Eurosceptic EFDD.

In January 2017, the M5S tried to change its group inside the European Parliament, moving from the EFDD to the ALDE. Despite an initial agreement, ALDE leader Guy Verhofstadt refused the M5S' admission to the group due to insufficient guarantees to come to a common position on European integration. The attempted move caused a chilling of relations with EFDD leader Nigel Farage, who was not informed about the M5S' agreement with the ALDE. Grillo was critical of the rejection and blamed "the establishment" for preventing them joining the ALDE. On 9 January, the Radio Radicale news correspondent David Carretta published documents about the financial and political benefits which would have accrued to the M5S for its admission to ALDE on Twitter.

In December 2017, Di Maio stated that he supported a referendum for Italy to leave the eurozone and would vote to leave. He rejected his previous position in January 2018, refusing the idea of a referendum on the euro, which cannot be done by constitution and was previously strongly supported by the movement. In February 2018, Di Maio stated that "European Union is the Five Star Movement's home". In September 2019, Di Maio confirmed that the goal was to change Europe from the inside. In November 2021, the party discussed switching to the Progressive Alliance of Socialists and Democrats group in the European Parliament.

Following the 2024 European Parliament election, after the failed attempt to create a new group with the Sahra Wagenknecht Alliance, in July 2024, the M5S applied to join The Left in the European Parliament – GUE/NGL. The M5S was initially admitted into The Left group with reservations, that is, for a six-month trial period with the status of "observer". On 4 February 2025, the M5S was finally permanently integrated into The Left group.

== Organisation ==
=== Symbols ===
2009–2015

2015–2018

2018–2021

2021–present

=== Leadership ===
==== Leaders ====
Name (born–died)		Term start	Term end	Duration
President
1	Beppe Grillo (born 1948)	4 October 2009	23 September 2017	7 years, 354 days
Political leader
2	Luigi Di Maio (born 1986)	23 September 2017	22 January 2020	2 years, 121 days
Political leader ad interim
–	Vito Crimi (born 1972)	22 January 2020	6 August 2021	1 year, 196 days
President
3	Giuseppe Conte (born 1964)	6 August 2021	Incumbent	5 years, 101 days

==== Vice Presidents ====
- Paola Taverna (senior, 2021–present)
- Michele Gubitosa (2021–present)
- Riccardo Ricciardi (2021–2026)
- Alessandra Todde (2021–2023)
- Mario Turco (2021–present)
- Chiara Appendino (2023–2025)
- Vittoria Baldino (2026–present)
- Ettore Licheri (2026–present)
- Stefano Patuanelli (2026–present)

==== Guarantor ====
- Beppe Grillo (2017–2024)

==== Committee of Trustees ====
- Luigi Di Maio (2021–2022)
- Roberto Fico (2021–present)
- Virginia Raggi (2021–present)
- Laura Bottici (2022–present)

==== Parliamentary leaders ====
- Leader in the Chamber of Deputies: three-month rotation (2013–2018), Giulia Grillo (2018), Francesco D'Uva (2018–2019), Francesco Silvestri (2019), Davide Crippa (2019–2022), Francesco Silvestri (2022–2025), Riccardo Ricciardi (2025–present)
- Leader in the Senate of the Republic: three-month rotation (2013–2018), Danilo Toninelli (2018), Stefano Patuanelli (2018–2019), Gianluca Perilli (2019–2020), Ettore Licheri (2020–2021), Mariolina Castellone (2021–2022), Barbara Floridia (2022–2023), Stefano Patuanelli (2023–2026), Luca Pirondini (2026–present)
- Leader in the European Parliament: three-month rotation (2014–2019), Tiziana Beghin (2019–2024), Pasquale Tridico (2024–present)

=== Structure ===
The party has been characterised as an entrepreneurial party. During the 2010 Italian regional elections, some parties highlighted a contradiction between the voluntary collective action in the struggles of civil society and openness in political representation. Also in 2010, there were tensions between the movement and Italy of Values.

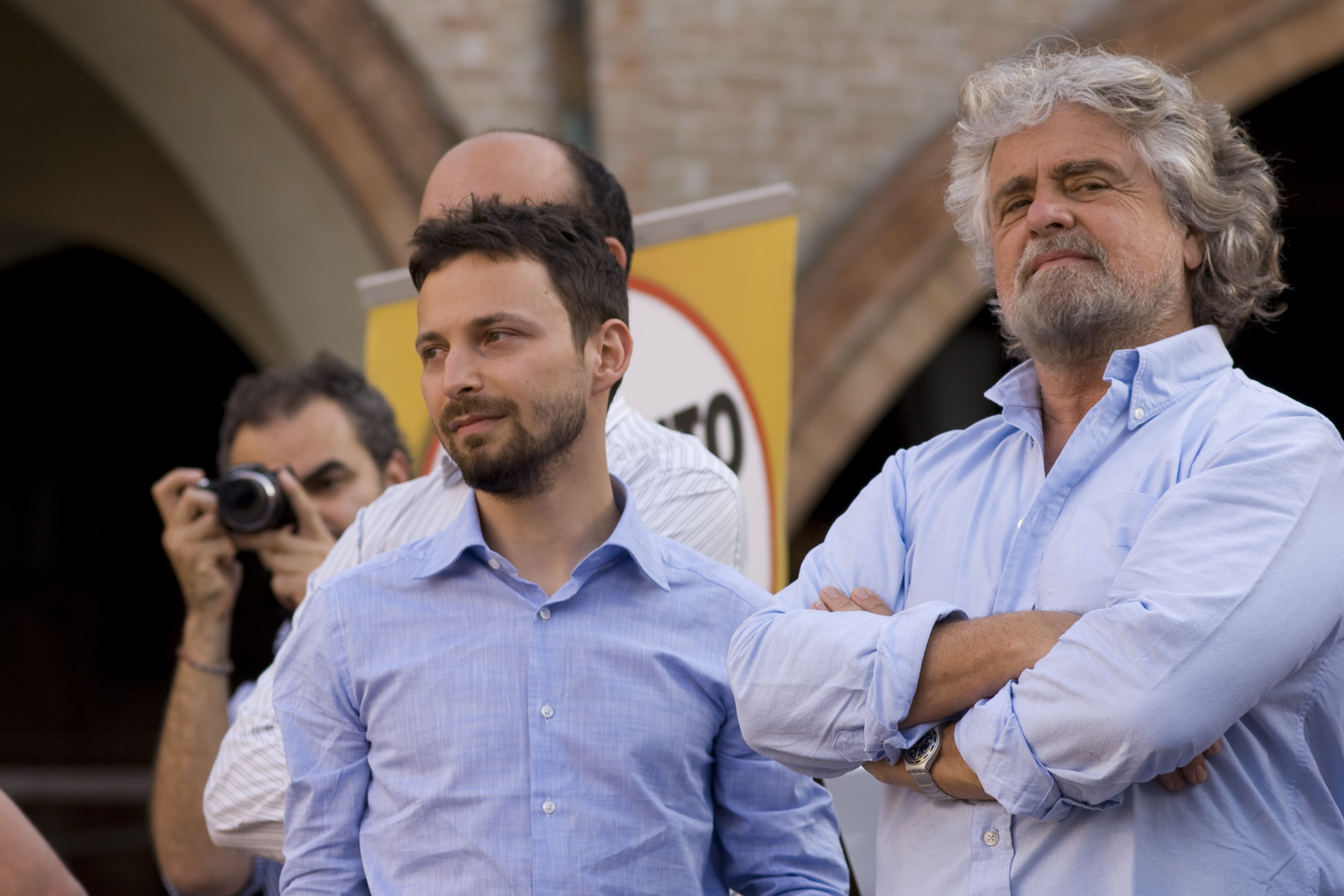
Grillo (on the right) with Giovanni Favia (on the left), who was expelled from the M5S in 2011

In March 2012, Valentino Tavolazzi, a city councillor in Rimini, advocated a national meeting on behalf of the movement, which gathered about 150 participants. At the meeting, there was both praise and criticism from the participants including from the few politicians who were present. The meeting took a harsh stance on the "conditions of Regulation M5S" because it was discovered to be in conflict with the statutes of its Civic Party of origin Project for Ferrara. In response, they lost the use of the logo, and were banned from taking any position on behalf of M5S, which was portrayed as a controversial move regarding internal democracy.

Since 2007, Grillo has criticised the cost of politics by supporting the reduction of payment for deputies and senators. Based on this policy, the benefits received by members of parliament would not exceed €5,000 gross per month, with any surplus returned to the state with solidarity allowance, also called end-term; however, according to Giovanni Favia, the regional director of the M5S, the deduction of €5,000 gross salary of parliamentarians is contrary to the principles of the movement as it would result in a reduction of only €2,500 net. In an interview published in several newspapers in November 2012, Favia estimated at €11,000 per month the fees prescribed for a member of M5S. The article does not explain how Favia got to deduct that amount because it necessarily includes reimbursements and per diem is not flat as costs and expenses which vary from member to member.

Following the expulsion of Favia and Federica Salsi for expressing views about the lack of internal democracy, the party has expelled several members for criticism. The expulsions were made unilaterally by Grillo; as per regulation, they took place without prior consultation with members of the movement. Another criticism frequently made by the same movement activists and former activists, such as Federico Pistono, social entrepreneur, author of Robots Will Steal Your Job, but That's OK, and former member, is about the absence of any form of effective participation on the web. There is a tool for collective writing of the program and the proposed laws, but the forum is considered inadequate for the purpose. Through his blog in September 2012, Grillo said that a portal to participate via the web was already under construction. The triggering was scheduled for the end of 2012; at the time of the 2013 general election, it was not yet realised. Through what became known as the Rousseau platform, which is not owned by the M5S, activists were able to vote on several questions including on confidence votes.

== Splinter parties ==
Since its entry into Parliament, the M5S has broken up into several breakaway parties:

- Italy Work in Progress (2014)
- X Movement (2014)
- Free Alternative (2015)
- Italy in Common (2018)
- Team K (2018)
- Italexit (2020)
- Alternative (2021)
- Together for the Future (2022)

== Election results ==
View source data.

=== Italian Parliament ===
Election	Leader	Chamber of Deputies					Senate of the Republic				
Election	Leader	Votes	%	Seats	+/–	Position	Votes	%	Seats	+/–	Position
2013	Beppe Grillo	8,691,406	25.6	109 / 630	–	1st	7,285,850	23.8	54 / 315	–	2nd
2018	Luigi Di Maio	10,732,066	32.7	227 / 630	▲119	1st	9,733,928	32.2	112 / 315	▲58	▲1st
2022	Giuseppe Conte	4,333,972	15.4	52 / 400	▼175	▼3rd	4,285,894	15.6	28 / 200	▼85	▼3rd

=== European Parliament ===
Election	Leader	Votes	%	Seats	+/–	EP Group
2014	Beppe Grillo	5,807,362 (2nd)	21.2	17 / 73	New	EFDD
2019	Luigi Di Maio	4,569,089 (3rd)	17.1	14 / 76	▼3	NI
2024	Giuseppe Conte	2,336,452 (3rd)	10.0	8 / 76	▼6	The Left

=== Regional Councils ===
Region	Election year	Votes	%	Seats	+/−	Status in legislature
Aosta Valley	2025	3,359 (8th)	5.56 (in Open Aosta Valley)	0 / 35	-	No seats
Piedmont	2024	99,806 (7th)	6.04	3 / 51	▼2	Opposition
Lombardy	2023	113,229 (8th)	3.93	3 / 80	▼10	Opposition
South Tyrol	2023	2,086 (13th)	0.74	0 / 35	▼1	No seats
Trentino	2023	4,523 (13th)	1.95	0 / 35	▼2	No seats
Veneto	2025	36,866 (7th)	2.20	1 / 50	-	Opposition
Friuli-Venezia Giulia	2023	9,486 (7th)	2.40	1 / 49	▼3	Opposition
Emilia-Romagna	2024	53,075 (8th)	3.55	1 / 50	▼1	Majority
Liguria	2024	25,659 (9th)	4.56	1 / 31	▼1	Opposition
Tuscany	2025	55,158 (8th)	4.34	2 / 40	▲1	Majority
Marche	2025	28,836 (6th)	5.08	1 / 31	▼2	Opposition
Umbria	2024	15,125 (6th)	4.71	1 / 21	–	Majority
Lazio	2023	132,041 (3rd)	8.54	4 / 51	▼6	Opposition
Abruzzo	2024	40,629 (6th)	7.01	2 / 31	▼5	Opposition
Molise	2023	10,044 (6th)	7.10	3 / 21	▼3	Opposition
Campania	2025	183,333 (4th)	9.12	6 / 50	▼1	Majority
Apulia	2025	95,963 (7th)	7.22	4 / 50	▼1	Majority
Basilicata	2024	20,026 (6th)	7.66	2 / 21	▼1	Opposition
Calabria	2025	48,775 (7th)	6.43	1 / 31	▼1	Opposition
Sicily	2022	254,974 (3rd)	13.64	11 / 70	▼9	Opposition
Sardinia	2024	51.129 (3rd)	7.77	8 / 60	▲2	Majority
