= Gianroberto Casaleggio =

Italian businessman (1954–2016)

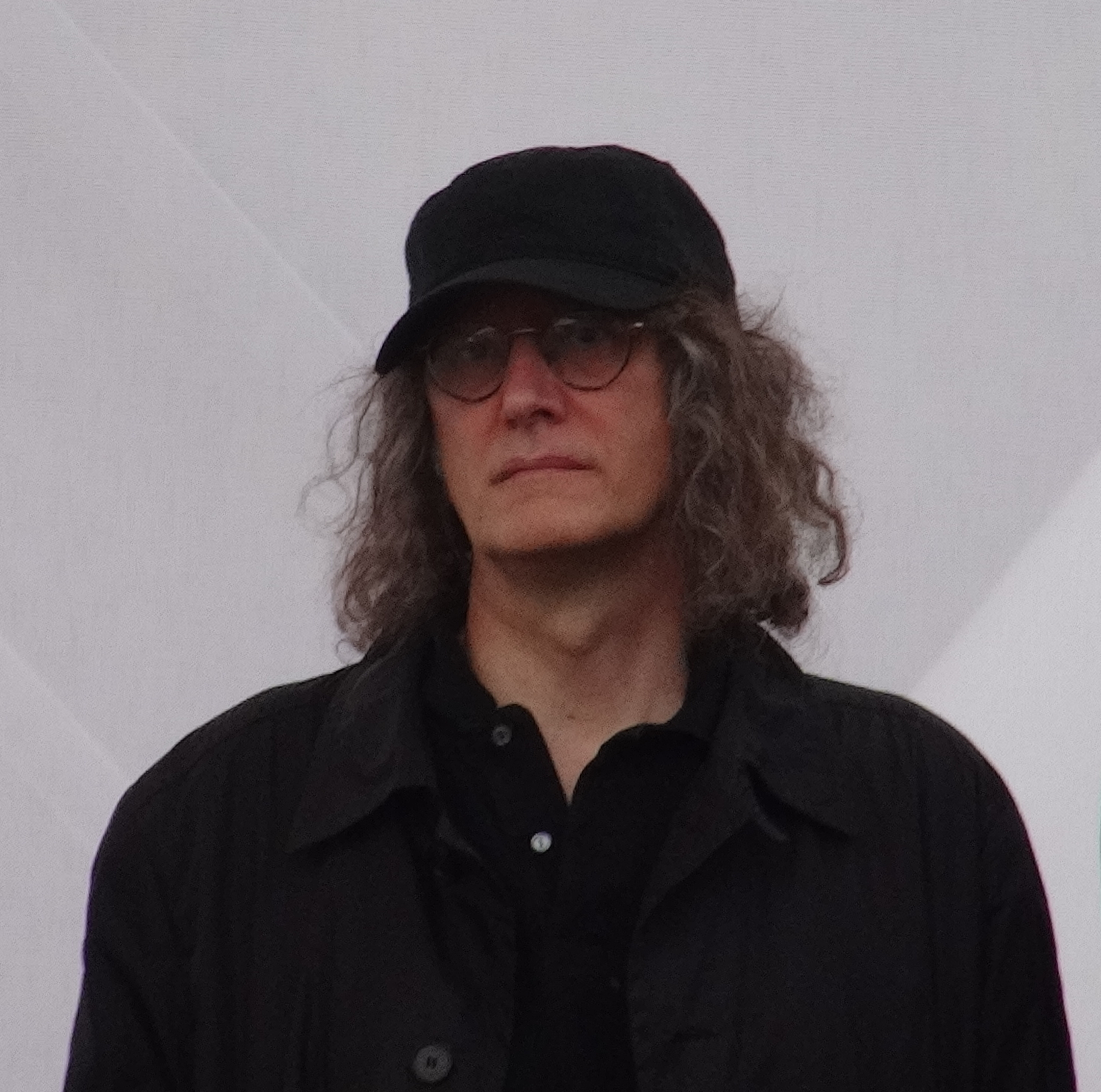

Co-founder of the Five Star Movement
- In office 4 October 2009 – 12 April 2016 Serving with Beppe Grillo

Personal details
- Born: Gianroberto Casaleggio; 14 August 1954 Milan, Italy
- Died: 12 April 2016 (aged 61) Milan, Italy
- Cause of death: Brain cancer
- Party: M5S (2009–2016)
- Children: 2
- Occupation: Activist; entrepreneur
- Website: casaleggio.it

Gianroberto Casaleggio (Italian pronunciation: [dʒanroˈbɛrto kazaˈleddʒo]; 14 August 1954 – 12 April 2016) was an Italian entrepreneur and political activist. He was co-founder and chairman of Casaleggio Associati srl, an internet and publishing company that advises on network strategies. He was editor of Beppe Grillo's blog, and together they founded the Five Star Movement, of which Casaleggio was sometimes called the "guru".

In the Italian context, Casaleggio promoted the Web as a medium for political communication.

== Biography ==
Born in Milan, Casaleggio began his career working at Olivetti, then, in the late 1990s, became CEO at Webegg, an internet consulting company. Webegg suffered heavy losses (over €20 million) in the period 2002–2003, and Casaleggio was replaced as CEO in 2003 by Giuseppe Longo. In 2004, Casaleggio founded Casaleggio Associati, an internet consulting company that carries out research on e-commerce in Italy and whose findings are presented at a conference held in Milan every spring (since 2006).

Casaleggio Associati became the editor of Beppe Grillo's blog in 2005, as well as of some of Grillo's books. Casaleggio Associati was also editor of the web-blog of Antonio Di Pietro until 2010, and the website of Chiarelettere, an editor, until 2013, when he was dismissed following disagreement over the editorial strategy.

Casaleggio died on 12 April 2016 in Milan, at the age of 61, after a long period of illness.

== Family ==
After Gianroberto's death, his son Davide was appointed to replace him as president of Casaleggio Associati.

== Sources ==
- (in Italian) Five Star Movement
- (in Italian) Personal website
- John Hooper (3 January 2013). "Italy's web guru tastes power as new political movement goes viral". The Guardian.
- Peter Popham (7 April 2013). "Italy's web politicians post their dystopic vision". The Independent.
