= Beppe Grillo =

Italian comedian, actor, blogger, and politician (born 1948)

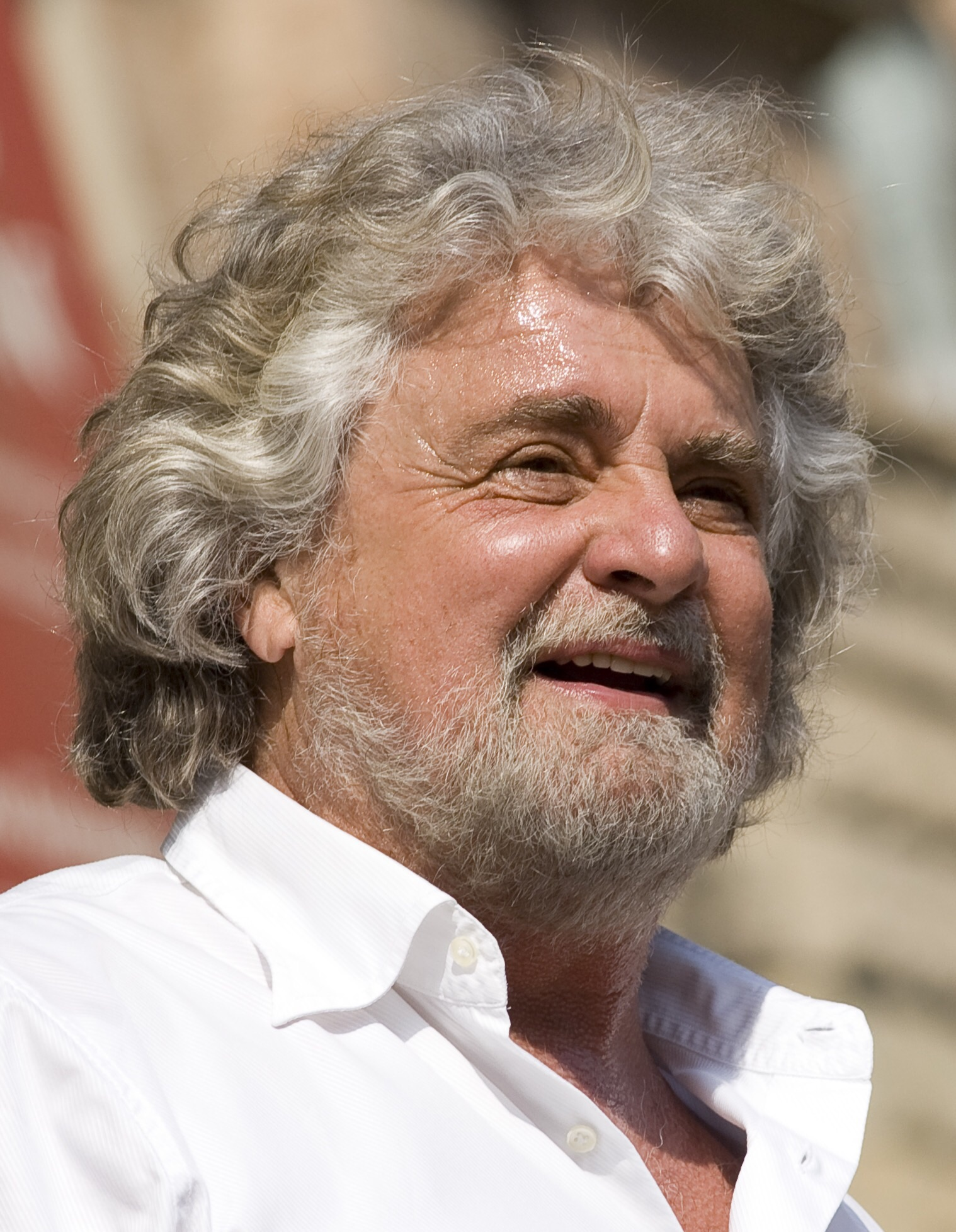
- Beppe Grillo in 2011

Guarantor of the Five Star Movement
- In office 23 September 2017 – 8 December 2024
- Leader: Luigi Di Maio; Vito Crimi (Acting); Giuseppe Conte
- Preceded by: Position established
- Succeeded by: Position abolished

Leader of the Five Star Movement
- In office 4 October 2009 – 23 September 2017
- Preceded by: Position established
- Succeeded by: Luigi Di Maio

Personal details
- Born: Giuseppe Piero Grillo; 21 July 1948 (age 78) Genoa, Italy
- Party: Five Star Movement (until 2024)
- Spouse: Parvin Tadjik (m. 1996)
- Children: 6
- Website: Official website

Giuseppe Piero "Beppe" Grillo (Italian: [ˈbɛppe ˈɡrillo]; born 21 July 1948) is an Italian comedian, actor, blogger, and politician.

He has been involved in politics since 2009 as the co-founder (together with Gianroberto Casaleggio) of the Italian Five Star Movement political party. Grillo became one of the most prominent examples of the populist surge which arose in Europe during the 2010s.

== Early life and career ==
Grillo was born in Genoa, Liguria, on 21 July 1948. He studied as an accountant but did not finish university. After high school, he became a comedian by chance, improvising a monologue in an audition. Two weeks later, he was discovered by Italian television presenter Pippo Baudo. Grillo participated in the variety show Secondo Voi from 1977 to 1978. In 1979, he participated in Luna Park by Enzo Trapani, and in the variety show Fantastico.

In the 1980s, he appeared in the shows Te la do io l'America (1982, four episodes) and Te lo do io il Brasile (1984, six episodes), in which he narrated his experiences of visits to the United States and Brazil. This led to his appearance as the protagonist of another show, developed especially for him, called Grillometro (Grillometer). In 1986, he appeared in a series of prize-winning advertisements for a brand of yoghurt.

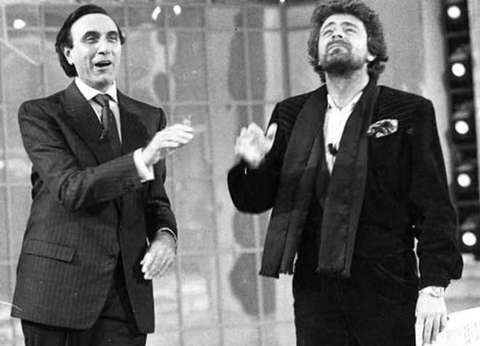
Beppe Grillo (on the right) with Pippo Baudo during the 1980s

Soon afterwards, his performances began to include political satire that offended some Italian politicians. In 1986 during the Saturday night television show Fantastico 7, he attacked the Italian Socialist Party and its leader Bettino Craxi, then Italy's Prime Minister, on the occasion of his visit to the People's Republic of China (PRC). As a consequence, Grillo was effectively banished from publicly owned television.

=== Exile from television ===
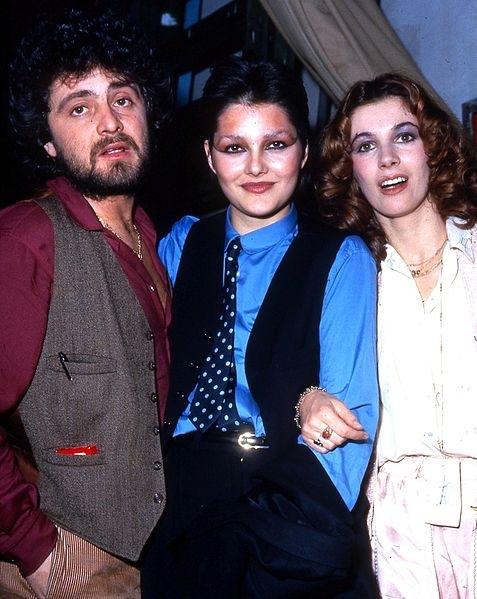
Grillo alongside Anna Oxa and Stefania Casini in 1978

Since the early 1990s, Grillo's appearances on television became rare; according to Mark Franchetti, politicians were offended by his jokes. When one of his shows was allowed to be broadcast live by RAI in 1993, it obtained a record share of 15 million viewers. Grillo often accuses the public broadcaster RAI of "public financing for the parties" that abuse it for their own propagandist needs.

Grillo also took aim at the Italian Socialist Party, which directly led to him having fewer television appearances after the mid-1980s. Grillo also criticized Biagio Agnes, then the director of the STET, for dishonest business practices. By the early 1990s, Grillo was known for his anti-establishment comedy as well as the denunciation of public policies. While it did give him attention and the beginning of his political base, it also directly led him to a lack of television appearances.

In 2007, he collaborated with the Italian singer Giorgia for the song "Libera la mente", from her album Stonata.

Despite this exile, excerpts from Grillo's Five Star Movement political rallies are often broadcast on television, especially on political debate talk shows. On 19 May 2014, Grillo returned to Italian public television, RAI to participate in the late-night political debate talk show Porta a Porta as part of his campaign for the 2014 European Parliament election. The program attracted three million viewers. As of August 2015, Grillo performed on stage in Italy and abroad. His themes included energy use, political and corporate corruption, finance, freedom of speech, child labour, globalization and technology.

=== Blog and web enthusiasm ===
Looking for another outlet, Grillo eventually turned to the internet. This started when Grillo met a manager of a small internet firm named Gianroberto Casaleggio. He expanded his influence to a larger audience with his website beppegrillo.it once the site was launched in January 2005. The internet was seen as an alternative source for media, which ran contrary to the mainstream media. Hence, Grillo was able to gain many followers who became disillusioned with mainstream Italian media. Over time, it also became seen as the "headquarters" of the Five Star Movement and the main hub of its activity, rather than a physical location. A year after its launch, it became recognized by Time magazine as one of the most influential websites to date. Despite the website's success, there were a number of other websites used to ramp up support for Grillo. One such site was Meetup, which was used to organize rallies and campaigns, making Grillo's progress even more apparent. The website was also used to discuss the political stances of Grillo as well as any other politically affiliated topic referring to Grillo.

As of 2014, Grillo maintained a blog in Italian, English, and Japanese that is updated daily. According to Technorati, the blog ranks among the 10 most visited in the world. In 2008, The Guardian included Grillo's blog among the world's most influential. He often receives letters from prominent figures such as Antonio Di Pietro (former Italian Minister of Infrastructures), Fausto Bertinotti (former President of the Italian Chamber of Deputies), Renzo Piano, and Nobel Prize Winners including Dario Fo, Joseph E. Stiglitz, the Dalai Lama and Muhammad Yunus. As Grillo became more and more involved in Italian politics, the use of his blog to convey a political message was accompanied by a strong emphasis on the role of the Web as the harbinger of new possibilities for direct democracy and for a fairer society, making Grillo one of the leading popularisers of digital utopianism in Italy. As of mid December 2017, the English and Japanese versions of the blog seem permanently defunct. The last entry in the English section is from November 2015, and in Japanese from October 2011. The Italian version, however, continues to be updated daily.

Grillo has spoken in support of a universal basic income on both his blog and on social media.

== Political career ==
=== Activism ===
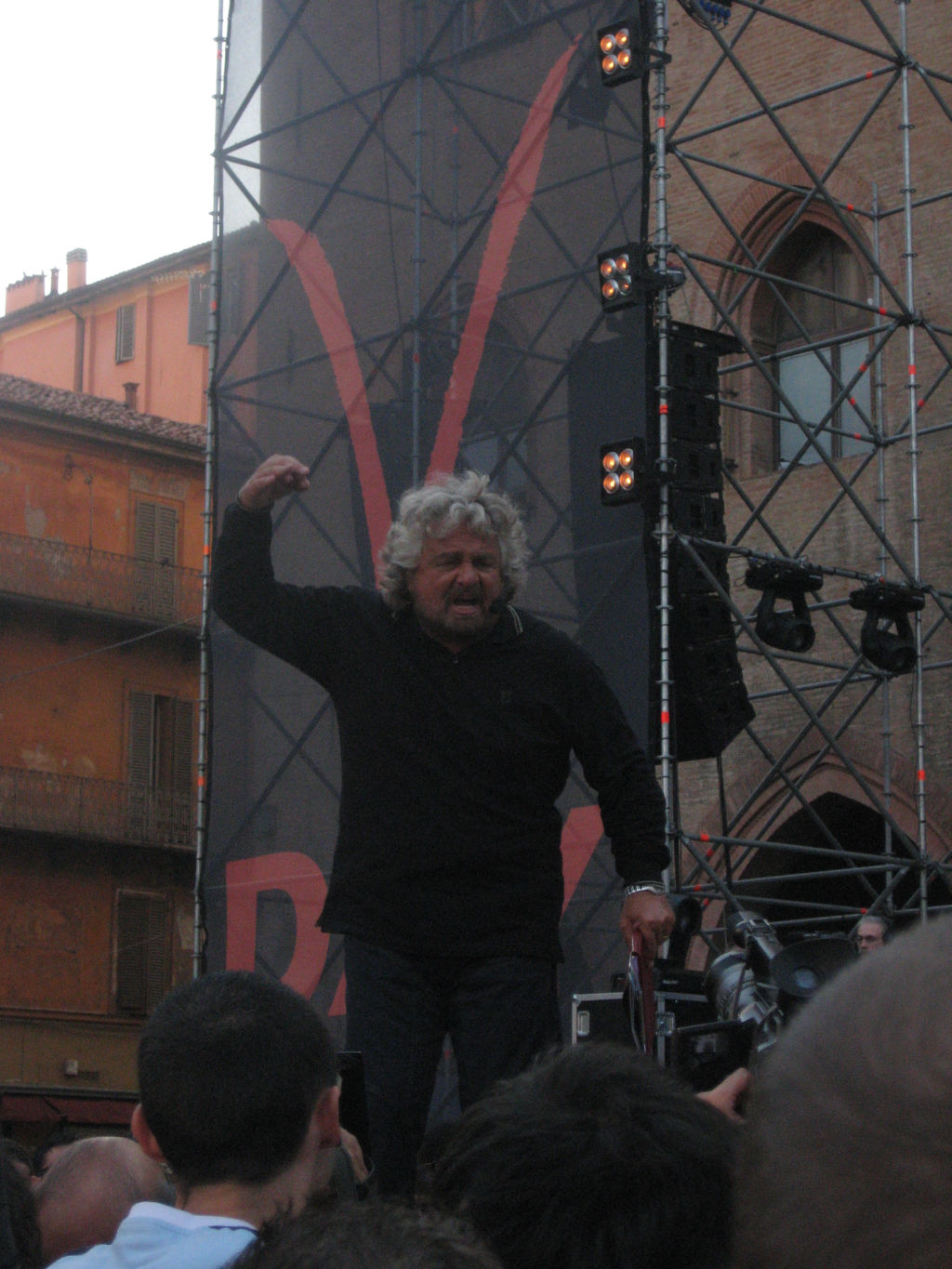
Beppe Grillo in Bologna speaking at V-Day in 2007

On 1 September 2005, Grillo used money donated by readers of his blog to buy a full-page advertisement in the Italian newspaper La Repubblica, in which he called for the resignation of the Bank of Italy's then governor Antonio Fazio over the Antonveneta banking scandal. In October 2005, Time chose him as one of the "European Heroes 2005" for targeting corruption and financial scandals.

On 22 November 2005, Grillo bought a page in the International Herald Tribune, saying that members of the Italian Parliament ought not to represent citizens if they have been convicted of a crime, even in the first degree of the three available in the Italian system. He maintains a regularly updated list of members of the Italian Parliament who have been convicted in all three degrees on his blog. On 26 July 2007, Grillo was permitted to speak to the members of the European Parliament in Brussels, where he drew attention to the state of Italian politics.

=== V movement ===
Grillo has led several national and international political campaigns. On 8 September 2007, he organized a "V-Day Celebration" in Italy; the "V" stood for vaffanculo ("fuck off"). During the rally, he projected the names of 24 Italian politicians who had been convicted of crimes including corruption, tax evasion and abetting a murder. More than 2 million Italians participated in this rally. He also used the rally to urge Italians to sign a petition calling for the introduction of a "Bill of Popular Initiative" to remove from office Italian parliamentarians with criminal convictions.

According to Internet scholars Alberto Pepe and Corinna Di Gennaro, V‑day was the first political demonstration in Italy developed and promoted via the blogosphere and the social networking services. The second V-Day took place on 25 April 2008, in Turin, San Carlo Square, dedicated to the Italian press and the financial support it receives from the government. Grillo strongly criticized the Italian press for the lack of freedom, Umberto Veronesi for his support for incinerators, NATO bases in Italy, politicians (Silvio Berlusconi had recently been re-elected), and the television channel Retequattro for retaining frequencies assigned to Europa 7..

In August 2008, Grillo was the subject of a report on the Australian Broadcasting Corporation's international affairs program Foreign Correspondent. Entitled "The Clown Prince", the report profiled Grillo's life, political activism, the V‑Day campaign and use of the internet as a political tool.

=== Five Star Movement ===
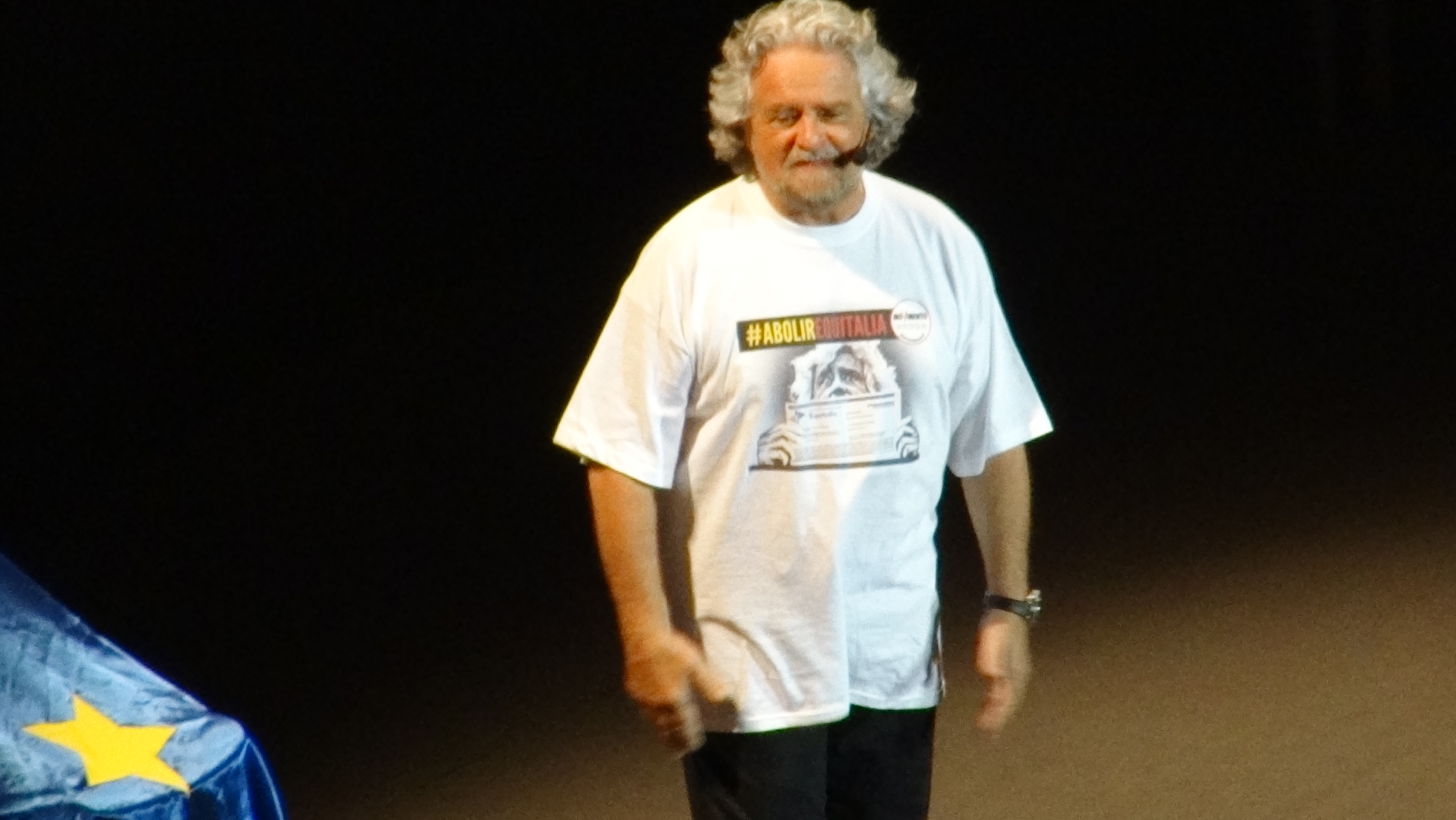
Beppe Grillo in Rome during the tour 2014

In 2010, he started a political movement, Movimento 5 Stelle, the "Five Star Movement" to promote through the Internet his ideals about honesty and direct democracy. The movement became a party with electoral prospects during the 2010 regional elections, with four regional councillors being elected. The party made further gains at the 2012 local elections, receiving the third highest number of votes overall and winning the mayoral election for Parma.

At the 2013 general election the M5S won 25.5% of votes, the second most popular one for the Chamber of Deputies, but obtained just 109 deputies out of 630 due to an electoral system which favoured parties running in coalition. In the European Parliament the M5S is part of the Europe of Freedom and Direct Democracy (EFDD) group.

In 2014, Grillo announced that he was aiming to get four million signatures to support his attempts to get a referendum on Italy's membership of the Eurozone. He collected around 200,000 signatures while the minimum is 500,000 but he announced that his project was going on despite the failure.

In June 2018, Grillo published a post on his blog in which he called for selecting the members of the Italian Senate through sortition, and possibly eventually replacing elections with sortition altogether.

== Legal issues ==
On 7 December 1981, Grillo lost control of a Chevrolet K5 Blazer as he drove on a military road, forbidden to civilians, from Limone Piemonte to Colle di Tenda. Six kilometres after "Quota 1400" near the border with France, the vehicle slipped on a sheet of ice and fell 80 metres into a deep ravine. In the car with Grillo were three of his Genoese friends, with whom he was spending the weekend of Immaculate Conception. Grillo saved himself from the passenger compartment before the car dropped into the void, and in a state of shock, he managed to call for help. Three of his friends in the car lost their lives: Renzo Giberti and Rossana Quartapelle, respectively 45 and 33, and their 9-year-old son, Francesco. On 14 March 1985, Grillo was found guilty of manslaughter.

In 2003, he settled a libel suit for defamation filed against him by Rita Levi-Montalcini. During a show, Beppe Grillo called the 94-year-old winner of the 1986 Nobel Prize in Physiology or Medicine and Italian Senator for Life (2001–2012) an "old whore".

When Italian judges were investigating the Parmalat scandal, which was then the world's largest corporate bankruptcy scandal, Grillo was called to testify because he had anticipated the imminent collapse of the dairy conglomerate in one of his shows. When the judges asked how he had been able to discover that, he said that Parmalat's financial holes were so evident that anybody who had enough ability to see them would see them, since the corporate accounting was easily accessible.

In 2012, Grillo was convicted of having defamed Fininvest in an article published in 2004 in the Italian magazine Internazionale. The compensation, equal to 50,000 euros, in addition to the costs of the proceedings, was established by the judges of the first section of the court of appeal of the court of Rome.

In September 2013, he was sentenced for defaming the former mayor of Asti and parliamentary for Forza Italia, Giorgio Galvagno. In 2003, Grillo had called Galvagno "a briber" during a performance at the Teatro Alfieri in Asti. Grillo had to pay Galvagno 25,000 euros and interest from 2003 as compensation for damages, plus compensation for legal costs.

On 12 December 2013, the Tribunal of Genoa sentenced Grillo in the first instance for defamation against Antonio Misiani, treasurer of the Democratic Party. In May 2012, Grillo published on the front page of his blog a mosaic of pictures with photographs of the PdL (Rocco Crimi), PD (Antonio Misiani) and UDC (Giuseppe Naro) administrators, along with those of former Lega Nord (Francesco Belsito) and The Daisy (Luigi Lusi). The judge has provisionally recognized a compensation for Misiani and compensation for the Democratic Party of 5000 euros.

On 14 September 2015, he was convicted by the tribunal of Ascoli Piceno for aggravated defamation against Franco Battaglia, professor at the University of Modena, to a term of imprisonment with suspended sentence, €1,250 fine and a provisional fee of €50,000 to the offender. In that occasion Grillo compared himself to Nelson Mandela and Sandro Pertini.

On 31 March 2017, Grillo was formally investigated along with Alessandro Di Battista for defamation following a police report filed by Marika Cassimatis, former candidate mayor of the M5S in Genoa.

On 11 July 2017, Grillo was convicted at the third and higher judgement level by the tribunal of Ancona to a payment of 6,000 euros, a provisional amount of 50,000 euros and payment of legal fees, raised to 12,000 euros for defamation against Professor Franco Battaglia.

Over the years, Grillo has accumulated a number of fines and/or convictions for building abuse and other crimes, such as attempted instigation to disobedience by inviting police officers to stop protecting politicians.

== Criticism ==
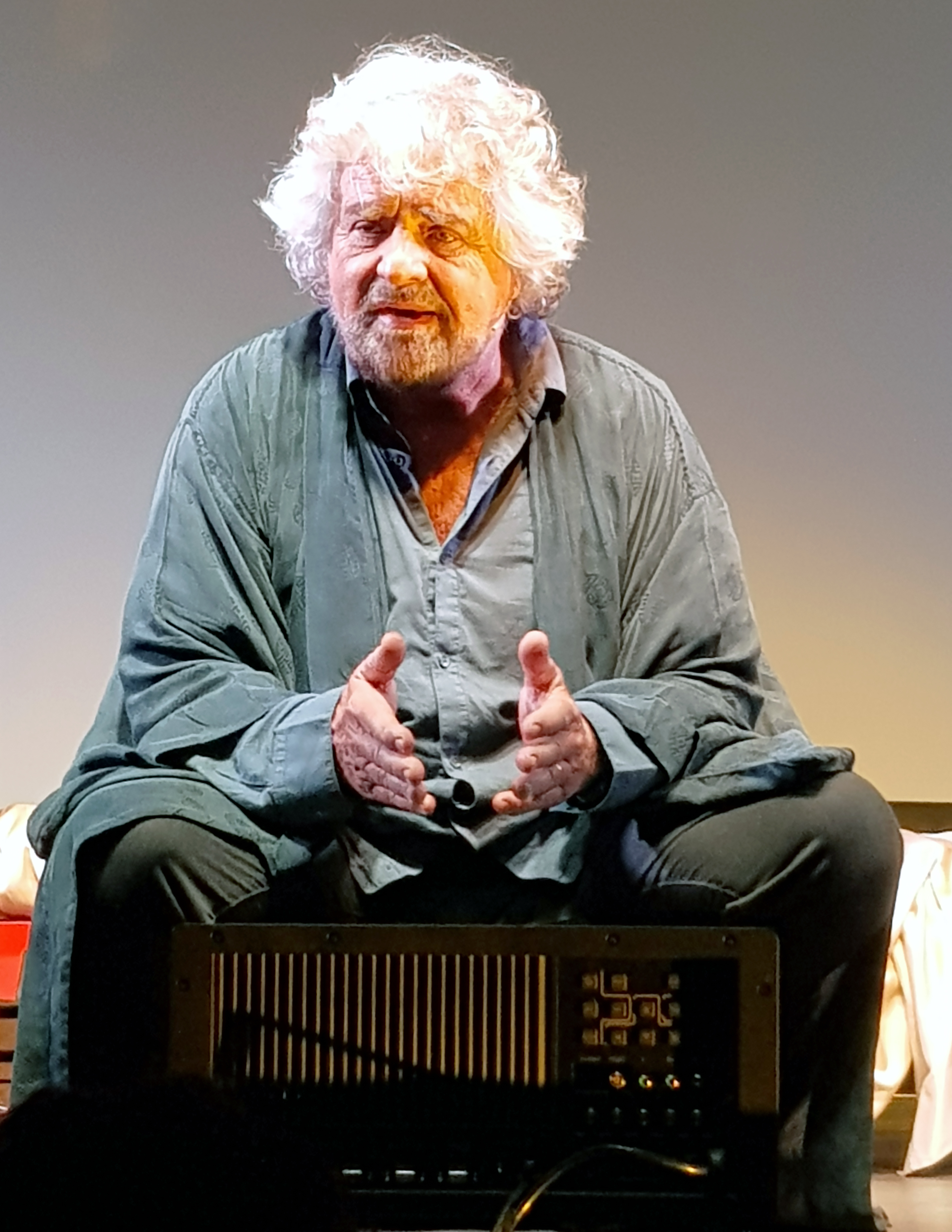
Beppe Grillo during a show in 2018

Grillo is often criticized for his lifestyle. In particular, critics blame him for owning a motor yacht and a Ferrari sports car, in contradiction to his environmentalist stance. In his blog, he said he acquired both but has since sold them. He defended himself from similar attacks from the leader of the Democratic Party on this subject, saying he earned his pay over the years and paid his taxes on it.

Grillo was also criticized for having taken advantage of the Condono Tombale, a tax amnesty granted by the first Berlusconi government in 2001, which Grillo had publicly opposed. Grillo said during the V‑Day demonstration that he had personally benefited by only €500.

Grillo has proposed that members of the Italian Parliament who have a criminal record should be banned from public office. Because Grillo was found guilty of involuntary manslaughter caused by a car accident, he cannot run for public office as a member of his own party, which prohibits those who have a criminal record from being candidates. He says he is not interested in becoming a member of the Italian Parliament. Despite this, in July 2009 he announced his intention to present himself as a candidate for the PD's primary elections, which does not imply automatic presence in the Italian parliament. He also proposed that MPs should be limited to two government terms of office, after which they may not stand again.

Grillo is also criticized as being a demagogue who attacks politicians on superficial issues and their private lives, while being unable to provide a valid alternative. For example, stand-up comedian Daniele Luttazzi criticized him in 2007 in an open letter published on the website of the news magazine MicroMega. Luttazzi accused Grillo of being a "demagogue" and a "populist", suggesting Grillo should choose between satire and politics.

In March 2013 a commentary piece in Der Spiegel called Grillo "The most dangerous man in Europe", described his rhetoric as anti-democratic, said he derived his energy from resentment, and cited the British writer Nicholas Burgess Farrell who has drawn parallels between Grillo and Benito Mussolini.

== Filmography ==
Grillo has appeared in three movies:

- Cercasi Gesù (1982)
- Scemo di guerra (1985)
- Topo Galileo (1988)

In 2008, Grillo was featured in the documentary The Beppe Grillo Story, produced by Banyak Films for Al Jazeera English. He also appeared in archive footage in the 2017 movie Call Me by Your Name.

== Public shows ==
- Buone Notizie ("Good News", 1991)
- Energia e Informazione ("Energy and Information", 1995)
- Cervello ("Brain", 1997)
- Apocalisse morbida ("Soft Apocalypse", 1998)
- Time Out (2000)
- La grande trasformazione ("The Great Transformation", 2001)
- Va tutto bene ("It's All Right", 2002–2003)
- Black out – Facciamo luce (2003–2004)
- BeppeGrillo.it (2004–2005)
- Incantesimi ("Enchantments", 2006)
- Reset (2007)
- V-Day (2007)
- V2-Day (2008)
- Delirio ("Madness", 2008)
- Monnezza-Day ("Trash Day", 2009)
- Movimento a cinque stelle ("5-Star Movement", 2009)
- Un Grillo mannaro a Londra ("A Werewolf Grillo in London", 2010)
- Woodstock 5 Stelle ("5-Star Woodstock", 2010)
- Beppe Grillo is back (2010)
- Te la do io l'Europa ("I'll Give You Europe", 2014)
- GrilloVSGrillo (2016)

== See also ==
- Gianroberto Casaleggio

Party political offices
New political party	Leader of the Five Star Movement; 2009–2017	Succeeded by Luigi Di Maio
