= List of members of the Senate of Italy, 2022–present =

This is a list of the 206 members of the Legislature XIX of Italy of the Italian Senate. Two hundred of them were elected in the snap 2022 Italian general election and assumed office on 13 October 2022, while five are senators for life. One seat is vacant.

== Seat division ==
Group	Seats			Group leader
Group	After election	Current		Group leader
Brothers of Italy (FdI)	66 / 206 (32%)	63 / 205 (31%)	▼3	Lucio Malan
Democratic Party – Democratic and Progressive Italy (PD–IDP)	40 / 206 (19%)	36 / 205 (18%)	▼4	Simona Malpezzi
League for Salvini Premier (Lega)	29 / 206 (14%)	29 / 205 (14%)	0	Massimiliano Romeo
Five Star Movement (M5S)	28 / 206 (14%)	26 / 205 (13%)	▼2	Barbara Floridia
Forza Italia – Berlusconi for President (FI)	18 / 206 (9%)	20 / 205 (10%)	▲2	Licia Ronzulli
Mixed Group (Mixed)	9 / 206 (4%)	9 / 205 (4%)	Steady	Giuseppe De Cristofaro
Civics of Italy – Union of the Centre – Us Moderates – MAIE (CdI–UdC–NM–MAIE)	3 / 206 (1%)	8 / 205 (4%)	▲5	Antonio De Poli
Italia Viva (Action – Italia Viva [A–IV] until 19 October 2023)	9 / 206 (4%)	7 / 205 (3%)	▼2	Raffaella Paita
For the Autonomies (Aut)	3 / 206 (1%)	7 / 205 (3%)	▲4	Julia Unterberger
Total	206	205		

== Current composition ==
Constituency	Senator	Party	Group	Birth date	Notes	Ref.
Basilicata – U01	Elisabetta Alberti Casellati	Forza Italia	Forza Italia – Berlusconi for President	12 August 1946		
Lombardy – U01	Alessandro Alfieri	Democratic Party	Democratic Party – Democratic and Progressive Italy	2 February 1972		
Campania – P01	Vincenza Aloisio	Five Star Movement	Five Star Movement	15 December 1946		
Piedmont – U02	Paola Ambrogio	Brothers of Italy	Brothers of Italy	2 December 1970		
Veneto – P01	Bartolomeo Amidei	Brothers of Italy	Brothers of Italy	23 May 1961		
Lombardy – P03	Renato Ancorotti	Brothers of Italy	Brothers of Italy	19 March 1956		
Emilia-Romagna – U04	Alberto Balboni	Brothers of Italy	Brothers of Italy	19 June 1959		
Lombardy – P01	Alberto Barachini	Forza Italia	Forza Italia – Berlusconi for President	21 August 1972		
Emilia-Romagna – P01	Michele Barcaiuolo	Brothers of Italy	Brothers of Italy	7 February 1979		
Liguria – P01	Lorenzo Basso	Democratic Party	Democratic Party – Democratic and Progressive Italy	19 February 1976		
Lombardy – P03	Alfredo Bazoli	Democratic Party	Democratic Party – Democratic and Progressive Italy	15 December 1969		
Piedmont – U05	Giorgio Maria Bergesio	League	League for Salvini Premier – PSd'Az	22 November 1963		
Veneto – U03	Anna Maria Bernini	Forza Italia	Forza Italia – Berlusconi for President	17 August 1965		
Liguria – U01	Gianni Berrino	Brothers of Italy	Brothers of Italy	7 May 1964		
Sicily – U01	Dolores Bevilacqua	Five Star Movement	Five Star Movement	27 August 1974		
Trentino-Alto Adige/Südtirol – U02	Michaela Biancofiore	Coraggio Italia	Civics of Italy – Union of the Centre – Us Moderates – MAIE	28 December 1970	Civics of Italy faction leader	
Campania – P02	Anna Bilotti	Five Star Movement	Five Star Movement	15 June 1982		
Veneto – U04	Mara Bizzotto	League	League for Salvini Premier – PSd'Az	3 June 1972		
Apulia – P01	Francesco Boccia	Democratic Party	Democratic Party – Democratic and Progressive Italy	18 March 1968		
Lazio – U03	Giulia Bongiorno	League	League for Salvini Premier – PSd'Az	22 March 1966		
America Meridionale	Mario Borghese	MAIE-Us Moderates	Civics of Italy – Union of the Centre – Us Moderates – MAIE	14 April 1981		
Lombardy – U08	Stefano Borghesi	League	League for Salvini Premier – PSd'Az	16 September 1977		
Tuscany – P01	Claudio Borghi	League	League for Salvini Premier – PSd'Az	6 June 1970		
Piedmont – P02	Enrico Borghi	Italia Viva	Italia Viva	6 August 1967	Elected from the Democratic Party	
Emilia-Romagna – P02	Lucia Borgonzoni	League	League for Salvini Premier – PSd'Az	18 September 1976		
Sicily – P01	Carmela Bucalo	Brothers of Italy	Brothers of Italy	27 June 1963		
Lombardy – P01	Alessio Butti	Brothers of Italy	Brothers of Italy	15 October 1964		
Lazio – P02	Nicola Calandrini	Brothers of Italy	Brothers of Italy	5 November 1966		
Lombardy – P03	Roberto Calderoli	League	League for Salvini Premier – PSd'Az	18 April 1956		
Sicily – P01	Carlo Calenda	Action	Mixed Group – Action	9 April 1973	Action leader	
Tuscany – P01	Susanna Donatella Campione	Brothers of Italy	Brothers of Italy	3 February 1966		
Campania – P02	Susanna Lina Giulia Camusso	Democratic Party	Democratic Party – Democratic and Progressive Italy	14 August 1955		
Campania – P02	Gianluca Cantalamessa	League	League for Salvini Premier – PSd'Az	2 February 1968		
Lombardy – P01	Maria Cristina Cantù	League	League for Salvini Premier – PSd'Az	21 December 1964		
Emilia-Romagna – U03	Pier Ferdinando Casini	Centrists for Europe	Democratic Party – Democratic and Progressive Italy	3 December 1955		
Marche – P01	Guido Castelli	Brothers of Italy	Brothers of Italy	30 November 1965		
Campania – U05	Maria Domenica Castellone	Five Star Movement	Five Star Movement	3 April 1975		
Marche – P01	Roberto Cataldi	Five Star Movement	Five Star Movement	15 April 1960		
Senator for life	Elena Cattaneo	Independent	For the Autonomies (SVP-PATT, CB)	22 October 1962		
Lombardy – U10	Gian Marco Centinaio	League	League for Salvini Premier – PSd'Az	31 October 1971		
Friuli-Venezia Giulia – U01	Luca Ciriani	Brothers of Italy	Brothers of Italy	26 January 1961		
Campania – U02	Giulia Cosenza	Brothers of Italy	Brothers of Italy	25 January 1968		
Sicily – U03	Stefania Craxi	Forza Italia	Forza Italia – Berlusconi for President	25 October 1960		
Europe	Andrea Crisanti	Democratic Party	Democratic Party – Democratic and Progressive Italy	14 September 1954		
Emilia-Romagna – P02	Marco Croatti	Five Star Movement	Five Star Movement	17 September 1972		
Tuscany – U04	Ilaria Cucchi	Italian Left	Mixed Group – AVS	22 June 1974		
Sicily – P01	Concetta Damante	Five Star Movement	Five Star Movement	5 September 1972		
Apulia – P01	Dario Damiani	Forza Italia	Forza Italia – Berlusconi for President	21 June 1974		
Veneto – U02	Luca De Carlo	Brothers of Italy	Brothers of Italy	7 August 1972		
Lazio – P01	Giuseppe De Cristofaro	Italian Left	Mixed Group – AVS	26 June 1971	Mixed Group faction leader	
Lazio – P01	Cecilia D'Elia	Democratic Party	Democratic Party – Democratic and Progressive Italy	31 June 1963		
Molise – P01	Costanzo Della Porta	Brothers of Italy	Brothers of Italy	29 October 1975		
Emilia-Romagna – P01	Graziano Delrio	Democratic Party	Democratic Party – Democratic and Progressive Italy	27 April 1960		
Marche – U02	Antonio De Poli	Union of the Centre	Civics of Italy – Union of the Centre – Us Moderates – MAIE	4 October 1960		
Lazio – P01	Andrea De Priamo	Brothers of Italy	Brothers of Italy	24 May 1971		
Campania – U07	Raffaele De Rosa	Christian Democracy	Forza Italia – Berlusconi for President	20 June 1978	Elected from the Five Star Movement	
Abruzzo – P01	Gabriella Di Girolamo	Five Star Movement	Five Star Movement	15 May 1977		
Friuli-Venezia Giulia – P01	Marco Dreosto	League	League for Salvini Premier – PSd'Az	18 March 1969		
Lazio – U01	Claudio Durigon	League	League for Salvini Premier – PSd'Az	10 September 1971		
Trentino-Alto Adige/Südtirol – U06	Meinhard Durnwalder	SVP	For the Autonomies (SVP-PATT, CB)	12 December 1976		
Apulia – U01	Anna Maria Fallucchi	Brothers of Italy	Brothers of Italy	19 May 1968		
Emilia-Romagna – U05	Marta Farolfi	Brothers of Italy	Brothers of Italy	1 January 1962		
Apulia – P01	Giovanbattista Fazzolari	Brothers of Italy	Brothers of Italy	24 February 1972		
Lazio – U06	Claudio Fazzone	Forza Italia	Forza Italia – Berlusconi for President	7 October 1961		
Abruzzo – P01	Michele Fina	Democratic Party	Democratic Party – Democratic and Progressive Italy	30 September 1978		
Veneto – P02	Aurora Floridia	Green Europe/Greens	For the Autonomies (SVP-PATT, CB)	6 May 1967	Previously in the Mixed Group (AVS)	
Sicily – P02	Barbara Floridia	Five Star Movement	Five Star Movement	5 February 1977		
Tuscany – P01	Silvio Franceschelli	Democratic Party	Democratic Party – Democratic and Progressive Italy	16 August 1970		
Campania – P01	Dario Franceschini	Democratic Party	Democratic Party – Democratic and Progressive Italy	19 October 1958		
Emilia-Romagna – P01	Silvia Fregolent	Italia Viva	Italia Viva	25 January 1972		
Sicily – P01	Annamaria Furlan	Italia Viva	Italia Viva	24 April 1958	Elected as an independent on the Democratic Party list	
Lombardy – U06	Adriano Galliani	Forza Italia	Forza Italia – Berlusconi for President	30 July 1944		
Piedmont – P02	Massimo Garavaglia	League	League for Salvini Premier – PSd'Az	8 April 1968		
Lombardy – U11	Daniela Garnero Santanchè	Brothers of Italy	Brothers of Italy	7 April 1961		
Lazio – P02	Maurizio Gasparri	Forza Italia	Forza Italia – Berlusconi for President	18 July 1956		
Campania – P01	Felicia Gaudiano	Five Star Movement	Five Star Movement	9 January 1966	Replaced Francesco Castiello	
Veneto – P02	Matteo Gelmetti	Brothers of Italy	Brothers of Italy	12 June 1975		
Tuscany – P01	Mariastella Gelmini	Us Moderates	Civics of Italy – Union of the Centre – Us Moderates – MAIE	1 July 1973	Elected from Action; previously an independent (Popular Centre)	
Sicily – P02	Antonino Germanà	League	League for Salvini Premier – PSd'Az	12 April 1976		
Africa Asia Oceania Antarctica	Francesco Giacobbe	Democratic Party	Democratic Party – Democratic and Progressive Italy	10 August 1958		
Piedmont – U01	Andrea Giorgis	Democratic Party	Democratic Party – Democratic and Progressive Italy	12 April 1965		
Umbria – P01	Antonio Guidi	Brothers of Italy	Civics of Italy – Union of the Centre – Us Moderates – MAIE	13 June 1945		
Veneto – P02	Barbara Guidolin	Five Star Movement	Five Star Movement	21 September 1975		
Campania – U03	Antonio Iannone	Brothers of Italy	Brothers of Italy	18 September 1975		
Calabria – P01	Nicola Irto	Democratic Party	Democratic Party – Democratic and Progressive Italy	5 January 1982		
North and Central America	Francesca La Marca	Democratic Party	Democratic Party – Democratic and Progressive Italy	30 October 1975		
Tuscany – U03	Patrizio Giacomo La Pietra	Brothers of Italy	Brothers of Italy	10 April 1961		
Lombardy – U05	Ignazio La Russa	Brothers of Italy	Brothers of Italy	18 July 1947	Senate President	
Marche – U01	Elena Leonardi	Brothers of Italy	Brothers of Italy	3 May 1975		
Tuscany – P01	Ettore Antonio Licheri	Five Star Movement	Five Star Movement	11 October 1963		
Sardinia – P01	Sabrina Licheri	Five Star Movement	Five Star Movement	4 June 1971		
Abruzzo – U01	Guido Quintino Liris	Brothers of Italy	Brothers of Italy	12 June 1979		
Emilia-Romagna – P02	Marco Lisei	Brothers of Italy	Brothers of Italy	15 March 1977		
Lombardy – P02	Marco Lombardo	Action	Mixed Group – Action	2 January 1981		
Campania – U04	Ada Lopreiato	Five Star Movement	Five Star Movement	6 September 1971		
Sicily – P01	Pietro Lorefice	Five Star Movement	Five Star Movement	18 July 1967		
Veneto – P02	Beatrice Lorenzin	Democratic Party	Democratic Party – Democratic and Progressive Italy	14 October 1971		
Marche – P01	Alberto Losacco	Democratic Party	Democratic Party – Democratic and Progressive Italy	1 July 1970		
Molise – U01	Claudio Lotito	Forza Italia	Forza Italia – Berlusconi for President	9 May 1957		
Lombardy – P03	Gianpietro Maffoni	Brothers of Italy	Brothers of Italy	2 November 1951		
Lombardy – P02	Tino Magni	Italian Left	Mixed Group – AVS	29 June 1947		
Lazio – P01	Alessandra Maiorino	Five Star Movement	Five Star Movement	24 July 1974		
Piedmont – P02	Lucio Malan	Brothers of Italy	Brothers of Italy	30 July 1960		
Lombardy – P03	Simona Malpezzi	Democratic Party	Democratic Party – Democratic and Progressive Italy	22 August 1972		
Emilia-Romagna – P02	Daniele Manca	Democratic Party	Democratic Party – Democratic and Progressive Italy	16 May 1969		
Lombardy – P02	Paola Mancini	Brothers of Italy	Brothers of Italy	4 November 1973		
Tuscany – P01	Paolo Marcheschi	Brothers of Italy	Brothers of Italy	23 March 1961		
Veneto – P01	Andrea Martella	Democratic Party	Democratic Party – Democratic and Progressive Italy	27 August 1968		
Apulia – U05	Roberto Marti	League	League for Salvini Premier – PSd'Az	11 June 1974		
Lombardy – P01	Bruno Marton	Five Star Movement	Five Star Movement	28 September 1969		
Campania – P02	Domenico Matera	Brothers of Italy	Brothers of Italy	19 May 1965		
Campania – U06	Orfeo Mazzella	Five Star Movement	Five Star Movement	30 September 1965		
Apulia – U03	Filippo Melchiorre	Brothers of Italy	Brothers of Italy	7 May 1966		
Sardinia – P01	Marco Meloni	Democratic Party	Democratic Party – Democratic and Progressive Italy	16 June 1971		
Liguria – P01	Roberto Menia	Brothers of Italy	Brothers of Italy	3 December 1961		
Lazio – U02	Lavinia Mennuni	Brothers of Italy	Brothers of Italy	17 April 1976		
Lazio – U04	Ester Mieli	Brothers of Italy	Brothers of Italy	22 April 1976		
Calabria – U02	Tilde Minasi	League	League for Salvini Premier – PSd'Az	24 July 1960		
Lombardy – P02	Franco Mirabelli	Democratic Party	Democratic Party – Democratic and Progressive Italy	9 February 1960		
Lombardy – U03	Antonio Misiani	Democratic Party	Democratic Party – Democratic and Progressive Italy	4 September 1958		
Senator for life	Mario Monti	Independent	Mixed Group – N-I	19 March 1943		
Lombardy – P02	Alessandro Morelli	League	League for Salvini Premier – PSd'Az	9 May 1977		
Emilia-Romagna – U01	Elena Murelli	League	League for Salvini Premier – PSd'Az	29 July 1975		
Sicily – U06	Dafne Musolino	Italia Viva	Italia Viva	4 December 1974	Elected from South calls North	
Sicily – U04	Nello Musumeci	Brothers of Italy	Brothers of Italy	21 January 1955	Elected from Diventerà Bellissima	
Piedmont – U03	Gaetano Nastri	Brothers of Italy	Brothers of Italy	18 March 1968		
Apulia – P01	Gisella Naturale	Five Star Movement	Five Star Movement	3 June 1969		
Campania – P01	Luigi Nave	Five Star Movement	Five Star Movement	13 May 1970		
Sicily – P02	Antonio Nicita	Democratic Party	Democratic Party – Democratic and Progressive Italy	10 February 1968		
Apulia – U04	Vita Maria Nocco	Brothers of Italy	Brothers of Italy	12 December 1974		
Calabria – P01	Mario Occhiuto	Forza Italia	Forza Italia – Berlusconi for President	6 January 1964		
Calabria – P01	Fausto Orsomarso	Brothers of Italy	Brothers of Italy	18 August 1971		
Veneto – P02	Andrea Ostellari	League	League for Salvini Premier – PSd'Az	17 March 1974		
Lazio – P02	Andrea Paganella	League	League for Salvini Premier – PSd'Az	3 December 1974		
Lazio – P01	Raffaella Paita	Italia Viva	Italia Viva	23 November 1974	IV faction leader	
Lombardy – P01	Adriano Paroli	Forza Italia	Forza Italia – Berlusconi for President	30 March 1962		
Tuscany – P01	Dario Parrini	Democratic Party	Democratic Party – Democratic and Progressive Italy	17 October 1973		
Trentino-Alto Adige/Südtirol – U01	Pietro Patton	Campobase	For the Autonomies (SVP-PATT, CB)	28 December 1957		
Lazio – P02	Stefano Patuanelli	Five Star Movement	Five Star Movement	8 June 1974		
Lazio – P02	Cinzia Pellegrino	Brothers of Italy	Brothers of Italy	17 July 1975		
Sardinia – U02	Marcello Pera	Brothers of Italy	Brothers of Italy	28 January 1943		
Campania – U01	Giovanna Petrenga	Brothers of Italy	Civics of Italy – Union of the Centre – Us Moderates – MAIE	6 July 1956		
Tuscany – U01	Simona Petrucci	Brothers of Italy	Brothers of Italy	17 April 1971		
Senator for life	Renzo Piano	Independent	Mixed Group – N-I	14 September 1936		
Liguria – P01	Luca Pirondini	Five Star Movement	Five Star Movement	8 June 1981		
Lombardy – U07	Daisy Pirovano	League	League for Salvini Premier – PSd'Az	19 December 1977		
Piedmont – P01	Elisa Pirro	Five Star Movement	Five Star Movement	15 July 1973		
Sicily – P01	Salvo Pogliese	Brothers of Italy	Brothers of Italy	3 February 1972		
Tuscany – U02	Manfredi Potenti	League	League for Salvini Premier – PSd'Az	21 July 1976		
Liguria – U02	Stefania Pucciarelli	League	League for Salvini Premier – PSd'Az	6 March 1967		
Emilia-Romagna – U02	Vincenza Rando	Democratic Party	Democratic Party – Democratic and Progressive Italy	9 June 1958		
Calabria – U01	Ernesto Rapani	Brothers of Italy	Brothers of Italy	2 May 1967		
Campania – P01	Sergio Rastrelli	Brothers of Italy	Brothers of Italy	17 January 1966		
Lombardy – U04	Isabella Rauti	Brothers of Italy	Brothers of Italy	17 November 1962		
Campania – P01	Matteo Renzi	Italia Viva	Italia Viva	11 January 1975	Italia Viva leader	
Friuli-Venezia Giulia – P01	Tatjana Rojc	Democratic Party	Democratic Party – Democratic and Progressive Italy	26 October 1961		
Lombardy – U01	Massimiliano Romeo	League	League for Salvini Premier – PSd'Az	22 January 1971		
Lombardy – U02	Licia Ronzulli	Forza Italia	Forza Italia – Berlusconi for President	14 September 1975		
Basilicata – P01	Gianni Rosa	Brothers of Italy	Brothers of Italy	27 March 1965		
Piedmont – P02	Roberto Rosso	Forza Italia	Forza Italia – Berlusconi for President	16 August 1967		
Piedmont – P01	Anna Rossomando	Democratic Party	Democratic Party – Democratic and Progressive Italy	30 June 1963		
Senator for life	Carlo Rubbia	Independent	For the Autonomies (SVP-PATT, CB)	31 March 1934		
Sicily – U02	Raoul Russo	Brothers of Italy	Brothers of Italy	3 March 1971		
Sicily – U05	Salvo Sallemi	Brothers of Italy	Brothers of Italy	31 January 1977		
Apulia – P01	Matteo Salvini	League	League for Salvini Premier – PSd'Az	9 March 1973	League leader	
Piedmont – P02	Giorgio Salvitti	Brothers of Italy	Civics of Italy – Union of the Centre – Us Moderates – MAIE	10 February 1968		
Sardinia – P01	Giovanni Satta	Brothers of Italy	Brothers of Italy	22 January 1965		
Veneto – P02	Daniela Sbrollini	Italia Viva	Italia Viva	30 September 1971		
Piedmont – P02	Ivan Scalfarotto	Italia Viva	Italia Viva	16 August 1965		
Calabria – P01	Roberto Scarpinato	Five Star Movement	Five Star Movement	14 January 1952		
Lazio – P01	Marco Scurria	Brothers of Italy	Brothers of Italy	18 May 1967		
Senator for life	Liliana Segre	Independent	Mixed Group – N-I	10 September 1930		
Lazio – P02	Filippo Sensi	Democratic Party	Democratic Party – Democratic and Progressive Italy	4 March 1968		
Abruzzo – P01	Etelwardo Sigismondi	Brothers of Italy	Brothers of Italy	29 September 1974		
Campania – P01	Francesco Silvestro	Forza Italia	Forza Italia – Berlusconi for President	22 October 1971		
Lazio – U05	Marco Silvestroni	Brothers of Italy	Brothers of Italy	8 November 1962		
Lombardy – P02	Elena Sironi	Five Star Movement	Five Star Movement	18 February 1961		
Lombardy – P02	Sandro Sisler	Brothers of Italy	Brothers of Italy	12 April 1968		
Apulia – U02	Francesco Paolo Sisto	Forza Italia	Forza Italia – Berlusconi for President	27 April 1955		
Trentino-Alto Adige/Südtirol – U04	Luigi Spagnolli	Democratic Party	For the Autonomies (SVP-PATT, CB)	10 February 1960		
Aosta Valley – U01	Nicoletta Spelgatti	League	League for Salvini Premier – PSd'Az	28 July 1971		
Veneto – U01	Raffaele Speranzon	Brothers of Italy	Brothers of Italy	7 October 1971		
Emilia-Romagna – P02	Domenica Spinelli	Brothers of Italy	Brothers of Italy	8 January 1969		
Veneto – P01	Erika Stefani	League	League for Salvini Premier – PSd'Az	18 July 1971		
Lombardy – P02	Cristina Tajani	Democratic Party	Democratic Party – Democratic and Progressive Italy	28 November 1978		
Sicily – P01	Daniela Ternullo	Forza Italia	Forza Italia – Berlusconi for President	9 May 1975		
Lombardy – U09	Giulio Terzi di Sant'Agata	Brothers of Italy	Brothers of Italy	9 June 1946		
Trentino-Alto Adige/Südtirol – U03	Elena Testor	League – Fassa	League for Salvini Premier – PSd'Az	20 July 1973		
Veneto – U05	Paolo Tosato	League	League for Salvini Premier – PSd'Az	8 September 1972		
Basilicata – P01	Antonio Salvatore Trevisi	Forza Italia	Forza Italia – Berlusconi for President	26 January 1976	Elected from the Five Star Movement	
Friuli-Venezia Giulia – P01	Francesca Tubetti	Brothers of Italy	Brothers of Italy	6 August 1982		
Apulia – P01	Mario Turco	Five Star Movement	Five Star Movement	16 June 1968		
Trentino-Alto Adige/Südtirol – U05	Julia Unterberger	SVP	For the Autonomies (SVP-PATT, CB)	5 September 1962		
Veneto – P01	Adolfo Urso	Brothers of Italy	Brothers of Italy	12 July 1957		
Apulia – P01	Valeria Valente	Democratic Party	Democratic Party – Democratic and Progressive Italy	16 September 1976		
Piedmont – P01	Francesco Verducci	Democratic Party	Democratic Party – Democratic and Progressive Italy	5 October 1972		
Umbria – P01	Walter Verini	Democratic Party	Democratic Party – Democratic and Progressive Italy	17 January 1956		
Lombardy – P01	Giusy Versace	Us Moderates	Civics of Italy – Union of the Centre – Us Moderates – MAIE	20 May 1977	Elected from Action; previously independent in the Mixed Group (Popular Centre)	
Umbria – U01	Francesco Zaffini	Brothers of Italy	Brothers of Italy	9 March 1955		
Tuscany – P01	Ylenia Zambito	Democratic Party	Democratic Party – Democratic and Progressive Italy	27 June 1974		
Emilia-Romagna – P02	Sandra Zampa	Democratic Party	Democratic Party – Democratic and Progressive Italy	16 June 1956		
Veneto – P02	Pierantonio Zanettin	Forza Italia	Forza Italia – Berlusconi for President	13 July 1971		
Piedmont – U04	Paolo Zangrillo	Forza Italia	Forza Italia – Berlusconi for President	3 December 1961		
Sardinia – U01	Antonella Zedda	Brothers of Italy	Brothers of Italy	17 January 1976		
Apulia – P01	Ignazio Zullo	Brothers of Italy	Brothers of Italy	20 August 1959		

== Former senators ==
Constituency	Senator	Party	Group	Date	Reason	Replacement
Sicily – P01	Gianfranco Miccichè	Forza Italia	Forza Italia – Berlusconi President	18 January 2023	Resigned	Daniela Ternullo
Lazio – P02	Bruno Astorre	Democratic Party	Democratic Party – Democratic and Progressive Italy	3 March 2023	Died	Filippo Sensi
Lazio – P02	Andrea Augello	Brothers of Italy	Brothers of Italy	28 April 2023	Died	Cinzia Pellegrino
Lombardy – P02	Carlo Cottarelli	Democratic Party	Democratic Party – Democratic and Progressive Italy	31 May 2023	Resigned	Cristina Tajani
Lombardy – U06	Silvio Berlusconi	Forza Italia	Forza Italia – Berlusconi President	12 June 2023	Died	Adriano Galliani
Senator for life	Giorgio Napolitano	Independent	For the Autonomies	22 September 2023	Died	Vacant
Campania – P01	Francesco Castiello	Five Star Movement	Five Star Movement	31 December 2024	Died	Felicia Gaudiano
