= 2022 President of the Italian Senate election =

- October 13, 2022

Needed to win: Majority of the entire membership 206 members, 104 votes needed for a majority
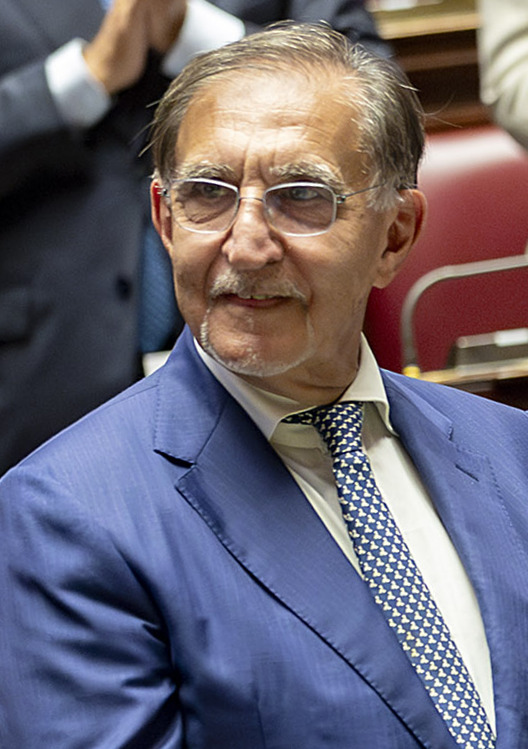
	Majority party
Candidate	Ignazio La Russa
Party	Brothers of Italy
Seat	Cologno Monzese (Note: Formally single-member electoral district no. 05 of Lombardy (Italian: collegio elettorale uninominale Lombardia - 05))
Members' vote	116
Percentage	56.31
President of the Senate before election
Maria Elisabetta Alberti Casellati
Forza Italia
Elected President of the Senate
Ignazio La Russa
Brothers of Italy

The election of the president of the Senate of the Republic who would serve through the Legislature XIX of Italy took place on 13 October 2022, over three weeks after the 2022 Italian general election. It resulted in Ignazio La Russa being elected president.

== Procedure ==
The election takes place by secret ballot, as required by the assembly's standing orders. Pursuant to the current rules of procedure, an absolute majority of the whole membership is needed to win on the first ballot. On the second and third ballot, a simple majority of votes cast (including blank votes) suffices. If the first three ballots fail to deliver a winner, a runoff is held between the two candidates who got the most votes on the third ballot.

== History ==
The election took place on 13 October 2022, over three weeks after the 2022 Italian general election. It took place by secret ballot, as required by the assembly's standing orders. Liliana Segre, being the oldest Senator present, served as the acting presiding officer.

Ignazio La Russa was the official candidate for the Presidency of the Senate of the centre-right coalition (composed of Brothers of Italy, Lega Salvini Premier, Forza Italia and Us Moderates), which at the time held 115 Senate seats (a majority of 11).

Parties which did not belong to the centre-right coalition instructed their members to cast a blank ballot.

All but two of the 18 Forza Italia senators refused to support La Russa, and decided not to cast a ballot. However, La Russa nonetheless managed to be elected president on the first ballot with 116 votes, due to support from some members of opposition parties.

== Results ==
Candidate	Party	Votes
Ignazio La Russa	Brothers of Italy	116
Roberto Calderoli	Lega	2
Liliana Segre	Independent	2
Blank votes		66
Abstentions (Note: Members in this category did not cast a ballot but were counted for the purpose of determining whether a quorum was present.)		1
Did not vote (Note: Members in this category did not cast a ballot and weren't counted for the purpose of determining whether a quorum was present.)		19
Needed to win		104 (Note: A majority of members)

The following senators did not cast a vote:

- Alberto Barachini (FI)
- Anna Maria Bernini (FI)
- Stefania Craxi (FI)
- Ilaria Cucchi (PD)
- Dario Damiani (FI)
- Claudio Fazzone (FI)
- Maurizio Gasparri (FI)
- Claudio Lotito (FI)
- Gianfranco Micciché (FI)
- Giorgio Napolitano (Ind.)
- Mario Occhiuto (FI)
- Adriano Paroli (FI)
- Renzo Piano (Ind.)
- Licia Ronzulli (FI)
- Roberto Rosso (FI)
- Francesco Silvestro (FI)
- Francesco Paolo Sisto (FI)
- Pierantonio Zanettin (FI)
- Paolo Zangrillo (FI)

== See also ==
- 2022 President of the Italian Chamber of Deputies election
