= Sigismondi =

Sigismondi is a surname. Notable people with the surname include:

- Etelwardo Sigismondi (born 1974), Italian politician
- Floria Sigismondi (born 1965), Italian-Canadian film director, screenwriter, artist, and photographer
- Pietro Sigismondi (1908–1967), Italian Catholic prelate and diplomat

== See also ==
- Sigismondo, opera by Rossini
- Sigismondo (given name)
