= 2020 Emilia-Romagna regional election =

Regional election in Italy

- 26 January 2020

All 50 seats to the Regional Council of Emilia-Romagna
- Turnout: 67.7% (▲30.0%)
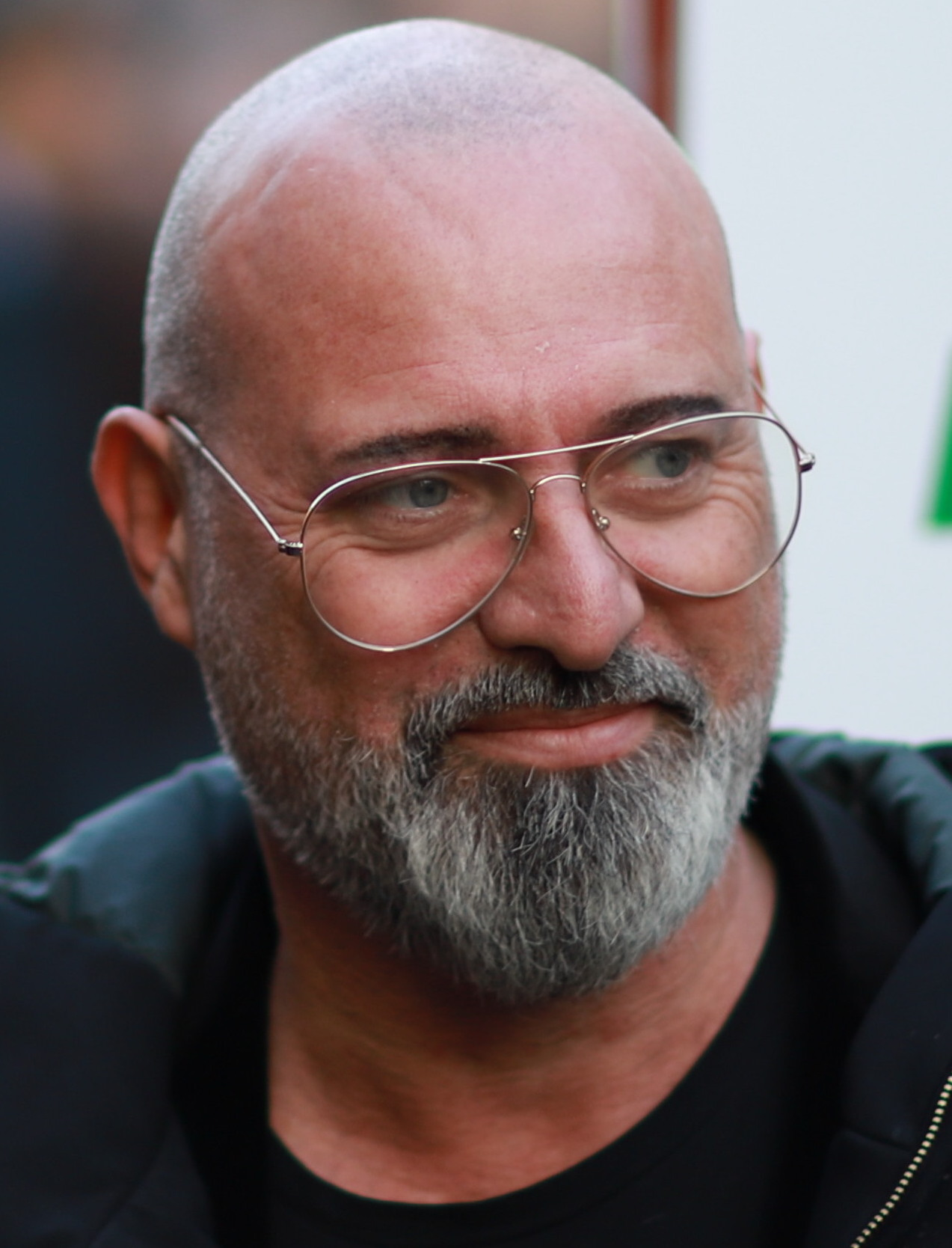

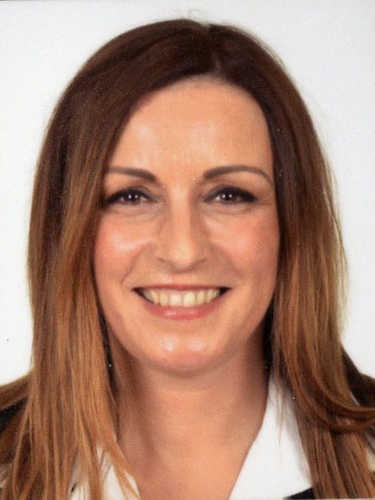
	Majority party	Minority party
Candidate	Stefano Bonaccini	Lucia Borgonzoni
Party	PD	Lega
Alliance	Centre-left	Centre-right
Seats won	29	19
Seat change	▼3	▲7
Popular vote	1,195,742	1,014,672
Percentage	51.4%	43.6%
Swing	▲2.4%	▲11.1%
- Maps of the election result
President before election
Stefano Bonaccini
PD
Elected President
Stefano Bonaccini
PD

The 2020 Emilia-Romagna regional election took place in Emilia-Romagna, Italy, on 26 January 2020. The result was the victory of the centre-left coalition and the confirmation of Stefano Bonaccini as President of Emilia-Romagna, with more than 51% of votes, nearly doubling the number of votes received in 2014.

== Electoral system ==
In Emilia-Romagna, a new electoral law was approved by the Legislative Assembly in July 2014, abolishing the blocked list. The voter can express one or two preference votes for the candidates on the chosen list; in the case of the expression of two preferences, these must concern candidates of different sex according to "gender preference" (under penalty of annulment of the second preference). As regards the election of the councilors, the law guarantees in any case at least 27 seats on the lists that support the elected president (majority prize), obtaining effects that are very similar to those of the list but acting on the provincial lists. The first 40 seats are distributed on a proportional basis. A seat is then attributed to the candidate for president who came second. The remaining 9 seats are assigned by majority method to the lists that support the elected president if these lists have obtained less than 25 seats with the previous procedure, otherwise the "prize" will be only 4 seats. If at the end of these assignments, the majority lists have not obtained at least 27 seats, these will be guaranteed by removing some of the seats already assigned to the opposition lists.

== Background ==
Despite Emilia-Romagna having always been considered one of the "red regions" – a stronghold of left-wing parties since the end of the World War II – in the 2018 general election the centre-right coalition became the largest political force in the region. The 2020 regional election has been considered as the first competitive one in the history of the region.

The centre-left nominated incumbent governor Stefano Bonaccini at the head of a coalition including the Democratic Party (PD) and its left-wing allies of Free and Equal (LeU) and Green Europe (EV), as well as More Europe (+E). Bonaccini also launched a personal civic list, named "Bonaccini for President", which included, among others, members from Matteo Renzi's Italia Viva (IV), Carlo Calenda's Action and Federico Pizzarotti's Italia in Comune (IiC). The centre-right proposed Senator Lucia Borgonzoni, member of the League (Lega) and former undersecretary to cultural activities in Giuseppe Conte's first government. The centre-right coalition included also Brothers of Italy (FdI), Forza Italia (FI) and Cambiamo! (C!).

== Campaign ==
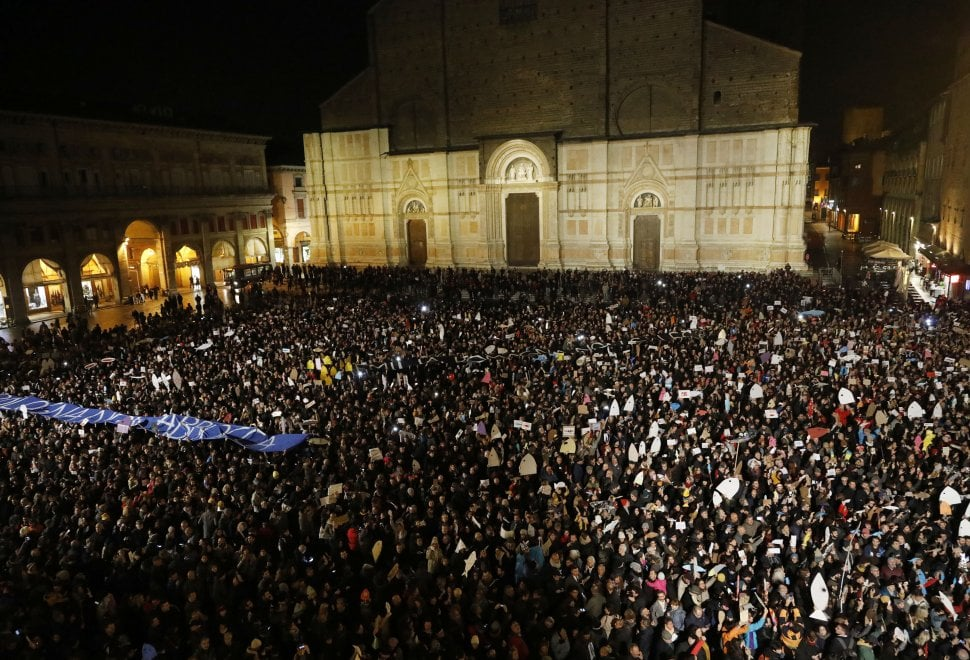
Almost 15,000 people gathering Piazza Maggiore in Bologna to protest against Matteo Salvini, November 2019

The official election campaign was opened on 14 November by the League, which organized a rally at the PalaDozza, the sport arena of Bologna. On that occasion Matteo Salvini presented the centre-right candidate Lucia Borgonzoni. At the same time, a flash mob named "6000 Sardines against Salvini" was organized in Piazza Maggiore, to peacefully protest against Salvini's campaign in Emilia-Romagna. On the following day, Nicola Zingaretti's Democratic Party held a three-day convention in Bologna, known as Tutta un'altra storia ("A whole different story").

On 19 November, Bonaccini and Borgonzoni had their first television debate, hosted by the talk show #Cartabianca by Bianca Berlinguer on Rai 3. The debate was followed by about 1.6 million viewers (6% share).

After a period of uncertainty regarding its participation in the regional elections, and after a decline in opinion polls and poor election results in 2019 Umbrian election, on 21 November the Five Star Movement launched a survey on its on-line platform "Rousseau", to ask its members if they should participate in the following regional elections. Almost 70% of members voted to run in the elections, and therefore M5S leader Luigi Di Maio announced the presentation of M5S electoral lists and a M5S candidate for the regional presidency, without party alliances.

On 7 December, more than 10,000 people gathered Piazza Maggiore in Bologna for the launch of Bonaccini's electoral campaign.

=== Electoral programmes ===
- Stefano Bonaccini, being the outgoing regional president, claimed the results achieved by his administration (including the "Pact for Labour" of 2015), and proposed four priority points summed up into the slogan "A step forward": to create free kindergartens for all children in the region, to break down the waiting lists for health interventions and access times to first aid, to carry out preventive maintenance and safety of the regional territory, and to reduce the phenomenon of NEET.
- The League of Lucia Borgonzoni proposed the introduction of some practices already existing in the other regions governed by the centre-right (in particular Lombardy and Veneto), including the opening of hospitals during public holidays and at night to carry out medical exams and laboratory tests, and the reduction of the regional IRPEF with introduction of 1.23% flat rate.
- The Five Star Movement of Simone Benini focused its programme on social, infrastructural and environmental issues, including the repeal of the regional legislation on urban planning, the rethinking of the Cispadana regional motorway project in favour of a fast road without toll, the reduction of waste to shut down incinerators and landfills, and generally introducing new environmental sustainability policies in the region.
- Stefano Lugli (The Other Emilia-Romagna) proposed a "safe" region in the sense of "fair, public and sustainable", i.e. based on social equality, the fight against the privatization of services and the relaunch of environmental policies.
- Marta Collot (Power to the People) presented a "rupture programme" based on equality, in particular proposing a guaranteed minimum wage of 9 euros per hour, redesigning the regional urban planning policies, and withdrawing the request for differentiated regional autonomy already presented by Emilia-Romagna in 2019.
- The Communist Party put poverty, social justice and equality at the centre of its programme.
- The 3V Movement "Vaccines We Want Truth" called for the lift of mandatory vaccinations recently enforced by the government for the access of children and infants to public schools and kindergartens.

=== Endorsements ===
==== Newspapers and magazines ====
Stefano Bonaccini:

- Il Fatto Quotidiano
- La Notizia
- HuffPost Italia

Lucia Borgonzoni:

- Il Giornale
- Libero
- La Verità
- L'Occidentale (party newspaper of Identity and Action)
- La Croce (party newspaper of The People of the Family)

== Parties and candidates ==
Political party or alliance	Constituent lists	Previous result		Candidate
Political party or alliance	Constituent lists	Votes (%)	Seats	Candidate
Centre-left coalition	Democratic Party	44.5	29	Stefano Bonaccini
Centre-left coalition	Bonaccini for President (incl. IV, A, IiC, CD, Pos and CpE)	—N/a	—N/a	Stefano Bonaccini
Centre-left coalition	Brave Emilia-Romagna (incl. Art.1, SI and èViva)	—N/a	—N/a	Stefano Bonaccini
Centre-left coalition	More Europe – PSI – PRI	—N/a	—N/a	Stefano Bonaccini
Centre-left coalition	Green Europe	—N/a	—N/a	Stefano Bonaccini
Centre-left coalition	Volt Emilia-Romagna	—N/a	—N/a	Stefano Bonaccini
Centre-right coalition	League Emilia-Romagna (LNE and LNR)	19.4	8	Lucia Borgonzoni
Centre-right coalition	Forza Italia (incl. UDC)	8.4	2	Lucia Borgonzoni
Centre-right coalition	Brothers of Italy	1.9	1	Lucia Borgonzoni
Centre-right coalition	Cambiamo! – The People of the Family (incl. IdeA)	—N/a	—N/a	Lucia Borgonzoni
Centre-right coalition	Borgonzoni for President	—N/a	—N/a	Lucia Borgonzoni
Centre-right coalition	Young People for the Environment (formed by Youth League)	—N/a	—N/a	Lucia Borgonzoni
Five Star Movement		13.3	5	Simone Benini
The Other Emilia-Romagna (incl. PRC, PCI, PdS, PU)		3.7	1	Stefano Lugli
Power to the People		—N/a	—N/a	Marta Collot
Communist Party		—N/a	—N/a	Laura Bergamini
3V Movement		—N/a	—N/a	Domenico Battaglia

== Opinion polls ==
=== Candidates ===
Date	Polling firm/ Client	Sample size	Bonaccini	Borgonzoni	Benini	Others	Undecided	Lead
26 Jan 2020	Opinio (exit poll)	–	48.0–52.0	43.0–47.0	2.0–5.0	–	–	5.0
25–26 Jan 2020	Tecnè (intention poll)	12,000	46.5–50.5	43.5–47.5	2.0–6.0	–	–	3.0
9 Jan 2020	SWG	1,000	47.0	45.0	5.0	3.0	19.0	2.0
9 Jan 2020	EMG	1,000	44.0	43.0	7.5	5.5	—N/a	1.0
6–8 Jan 2020	Demopolis	1,000	46.5	44.5	6.5	2.5	24.0	2.0
7 Jan 2020	Noto	1,000	45.0	43.0	7.0	5.0	—N/a	2.0
5 Jan 2020	Affaritaliani.it	–	45.0	43.0	7.0	5.0	—N/a	2.0
30–31 Dec 2019	Tecnè	1,000	44.0	43.0	7.5	5.5	—N/a	1.0
27–30 Dec 2019	MG Research	–	45.5	43.5	7.5	3.5	—N/a	2.0
28 Dec 2019	Opinio Italia	1,000	46.5	43.5	7.5	2.5	—N/a	3.0
22–23 Dec 2019	Tecnè	1,000	46.0	44.0	7.0	3.0	—N/a	2.0
18–22 Dec 2019	Demopolis	4,008	46.0	44.0	7.0	3.0	25.0	2.0
14–18 Dec 2019	EMG	1,000	46.5	43.5	6.5	3.5	—N/a	3.0
17 Dec 2019	Ixè	1,000	47.2	40.1	7.8	4.9	25.0	7.1
13 Dec 2019	MG Research	–	44.5	44.5	8.5	2.5	—N/a	Tie
12 Dec 2019	Noto	–	47.0	43.0	6.0	4.0	—N/a	4.0
9–12 Dec 2019	Ipsos	1,000	44.2	42.1	8.4	5.3	—N/a	2.1
10–11 Dec 2019	Tecnè	1,000	45.0	44.0	7.0	4.0	—N/a	1.0
2–4 Dec 2019	EMG	1,000	46.5	44.0	5.5	4.0	—N/a	2.5
29 Nov–2 Dec 2019	IZI	1,007	45.4	40.6	9.9	4.1	—N/a	4.9
29 Nov 2019	MG Research	–	44.5	45.0	8.0	2.5	—N/a	0.5
25 Nov 2019	Piepoli	–	44.0	43.0	9.0	4.0	—N/a	1.0
24 Nov 2019	Affaritaliani.it	–	46.0	44.0	7.0	3.0	25.0	2.0
22–24 Nov 2019	Tecnè	1,000	45.0	45.0	8.0	2.0	—N/a	Tie
22–24 Nov 2019	Tecnè	1,000	50.5	47.5	w. CSX	2.0	—N/a	3.0
21 Nov 2019	Noto	–	45.0	44.0	8.0	3.0	—N/a	1.0
21 Nov 2019	Noto	–	52.0	46.0	w. CSX	2.0	—N/a	6.0
21 Nov 2019	Noto	–	49.0	46.0	abst.	5.0	—N/a	3.0
19 Nov 2019	Ixè	1,000	40.0	29.2	5.0	7.7	18.1	10.8
19 Nov 2019	Ixè	1,000	41.2	29.4	abst.	8.8	20.3	11.8
13–19 Nov 2019	SWG (Note: This poll was commissioned by a political party.)	1,000	43.0	45.0	7.0	5.0	15.0	2.0
15 Nov 2019	MG Research	–	44.0	46.0	7.0	3.0	—N/a	2.0
9–14 Nov 2019	ScenariPolitici–Winpoll	1,000	50.7	42.1	6.2	1.0	—N/a	8.6
9–10 Nov 2019	Tecnè	800	46.0	45.0	7.0	2.0	—N/a	1.0
9–10 Nov 2019	Tecnè	800	51.0	47.0	w. CSX	2.0	—N/a	4.0
9–10 Nov 2019	Tecnè	800	50.0	48.0	abst.	2.0	—N/a	2.0
8 nov 2019	Affari Italiani	—	41.0	45.0	12.0	2.0	—N/a	4.0
31 Oct–4 Nov 2019	EMG	1,000	45.5	44.0	7.0	3.5	—N/a	1.5
20 Sep 2019	Repubblica	–	45.0	36.0	—N/a	—N/a	—N/a	9.0
20 Sep 2019	Il Resto del Carlino	–	48.0	31.0	6.5	13.7	—N/a	17.0
6–12 Sep 2019	SWG	1,000	41.0	42.0	13.0	4.0	25.0	1.0
23 November 2014	Election results	–	49.1	29.8	13.3	7.7	–	25.1

=== Parties ===
Date	Polling firm	Sample size	Centre-left				Centre-right				M5S	Others	Undecided	Lead
Date	Polling firm	Sample size	PD	ERC	BP	Other	Lega	FI	FdI	Other	M5S	Others	Undecided	Lead
26 Jan 2020	Election results	–	34.7	3.8	5.8	3.9	31.9	2.6	8.6	2.3	4.5	1.5	–	2.8
6–8 Jan 2020	Demopolis	1,000	44.5				45.0				7.8	2.7	24.0	0.5
30–31 Dec 2019	Tecnè	1,000	28.5	—N/a	7.0	7.0	30.0	4.5	5.0	4.5	7.5	6.0	—N/a	1.5
27–30 Dec 2019	MG Research	–	28.5	—N/a	6.5	9.0	33.0	—N/a	7.0	5.0	7.5	3.5	—N/a	4.5
22–23 Dec 2019	Tecnè	1,000	31.0	—N/a	—N/a	14.0	30.0	5.0	7.0	3.0	7.0	3.0	—N/a	1.0
18–22 Dec 2019	Demopolis	4,008	44.0				45.0				8.0	3.0	25.0	1.0
13–17 Dec 2019	Ixè	1,000	29.4	—N/a	7.8	6.8	27.8	4.2	7.9	2.0	8.8	5.3	—N/a	1.6
13 Dec 2019	MG Research	–	34.5	1.0	—N/a	5.5	32.5	5.5	7.0	2.0	9.5	2.5	—N/a	2.0
9–12 Dec 2019	Ipsos	1,000	22.9	—N/a	20.2	—N/a	25.9	2.0	10.1	4.8	8.2	5.9	—N/a	3.0
10–11 Dec 2019	Tecnè	1,000	30.0	14.0			30.0	5.0	7.0	3.0	7.0	4.0	—N/a	Tie
29 Nov–2 Dec 2019	IZI	1,007	24.7	—N/a	11.0	5.2	29.8	5.1	9.4	1.1	10.9	2.8	—N/a	5.1
29 Nov 2019	MG Research	–	34.0	1.5	—N/a	5.5	33.0	5.5	7.5	1.5	9.0	2.5	—N/a	1.0
22–24 Nov 2019	Tecnè	1,000	31.0	—N/a	—N/a	13.0	31.0	5.0	6.0	4.0	8.0	2.0	—N/a	Tie
22–24 Nov 2019	Tecnè	1,000	31.0	—N/a	—N/a	13.0	32.0	5.0	6.0	5.0	6.0 (Note: with CSX)	2.0	—N/a	1.0
19 Nov 2019	Ixè	1,000	34.3	—N/a	—N/a	—N/a	30.9	5.1	6.0	—N/a	10.4	13.3	—N/a	3.4
13–19 Nov 2019	SWG	1,000	27.0	2.5	—N/a	10.5	32.0	4.5	7.0	5.0	8.5	3.0	16.0	5.0
13–19 Nov 2019	SWG	1,000	29.0	3.5	—N/a	12.5	33.5	4.5	7.5	5.0	abst.	4.5	18.0	4.5
15 Nov 2019	MG Research	–	35.0	2.0	—N/a	3.5	34.0	5.0	8.0	1.0	8.5	4.5	—N/a	1.0
9–14 Nov 2019	ScenariPolitici–Winpoll	1,000	33.9	2.5	8.4	—N/a	33.0	4.4	6.1	4.1	6.0	1.6	—N/a	0.9
4 Nov 2019	Termometro Politico	–	46.0				48.5				—N/a	—N/a	—N/a	2.5
1 Nov 2019	MG Research	–	27.0	1.5	—N/a	11.0	33.0	5.0	7.5	1.0	10.0	6.0	—N/a	6.0
28 Oct 2019	Affaritaliani.it	–	31.7	—N/a	—N/a	—N/a	34.5	5.0	7.4	—N/a	6.5	—N/a	—N/a	2.8
20 Sep 2019	Il Resto del Carlino	–	44.5				43.6				8.5	—N/a	—N/a	0.9
6–12 Sep 2019	SWG	1,000	33.5	2.0	—N/a	4.5	33.5	4.0	5.5	1.5	13.0	—N/a	—N/a	Tie
6–10 Jul 2019	GPF	1,200	14.9	—N/a	—N/a	—N/a	15.8	3.0	2.2	—N/a	6.1	2.6	32.5	0.9
3 Jul–21 Dec 2018	Ipsos	1,440	17.0	—N/a	—N/a	—N/a	23.0	3.0	—N/a	—N/a	15.0	4.0	38.0	6.0
23 Nov 2014	Election results	–	44.5	6.9	–	1.9	19.4	8.4	1.9	–	13.3	3.6	–	25.1

== Results ==
26 January 2020 Emilia-Romagna regional election results
Candidates	Votes	%	Seats	Parties	Votes	%	Seats
Stefano Bonaccini	1,195,742	51.42	1	Democratic Party	749,976	34.69	22
Stefano Bonaccini	1,195,742	51.42	1	Bonaccini for President	124,591	5.76	3
Stefano Bonaccini	1,195,742	51.42	1	Brave Emilia-Romagna	81,419	3.77	2
Stefano Bonaccini	1,195,742	51.42	1	Green Europe	42,156	1.95	1
Stefano Bonaccini	1,195,742	51.42	1	More Europe – PSI – PRI	33,087	1.53	–
Stefano Bonaccini	1,195,742	51.42	1	Volt Emilia-Romagna	9.253	0.43	–
Stefano Bonaccini	1,195,742	51.42	1	Total	1,040,482	48.12	28
Lucia Borgonzoni	1,014,672	43.63	1	League	690,864	31.95	14
Lucia Borgonzoni	1,014,672	43.63	1	Brothers of Italy	185,796	8.59	3
Lucia Borgonzoni	1,014,672	43.63	1	Forza Italia	55,317	2.56	1
Lucia Borgonzoni	1,014,672	43.63	1	Borgonzoni for President	37,462	1.73	–
Lucia Borgonzoni	1,014,672	43.63	1	Cambiamo! – The People of the Family	6,341	0.29	–
Lucia Borgonzoni	1,014,672	43.63	1	Young People for the Environment	6,007	0.28	–
Lucia Borgonzoni	1,014,672	43.63	1	Total	981,787	45.41	18
Simone Benini	80,823	3.48	–	Five Star Movement	102,595	4.74	2
Domenico Battaglia	10,979	0.47	–	3V Movement	11,187	0.52	–
Laura Bergamini	10,269	0.44	–	Communist Party	10,287	0.48	–
Marta Collot	7,029	0.30	–	Power to the People	8,048	0.37	–
Stefano Lugli	5,983	0.26	–	The Other Emilia-Romagna	7,830	0.36	–
Total candidates	2,325,497	100.00	2	Total parties	2,162,216	100.00	48
Blank and invalid votes	48,477	2.04					
Registered voters/turnout	3,508,179	67.67					
Source: Ministry of the Interior – Election in Emilia-Romagna

Popular vote
PD	34.69%
Lega	31.95%
FdI	8.59%
BP	5.76%
M5S	4.74%
ERC	3.77%
FI	2.56%
EV	1.95%
BP	1.73%
+E	1.53%
Others	2.73%

President
Bonaccini	51.42%
Borgonzoni	43.63%
Benini	3.48%
Battaglia	0.47%
Bergamini	0.44%
Collot	0.30%
Lugli	0.26%

Seats summary
Centre-left	58.00%
Centre-right	38.00%
M5S	4.00%

=== Results by province and capital city ===
Province	Stefano Bonaccini	Lucia Borgonzoni	Others
Bologna	331,161 59.66%	198,385 35.74%	25,570 4.60%
Modena	194,797 53.05%	154,166 41.98%	18,237 4.97%
Reggio Emilia	149,534 55.14%	106,583 39.30%	15,074 5.56%
Parma	101,548 45.64%	110,512 49.67%	10,419 4.69%
Forlì-Cesena	103,014 49.92%	91,495 44.34%	11,829 5.74%
Ravenna	109,553 52.75%	87,386 42.08%	10,733 5.17%
Ferrara	74,662 40.76%	100,524 54.88%	7,795 4.36%
Rimini	79,685 46.37%	81,789 47.59%	10,378 6.04%
Piacenza	51,788 36.87%	83,832 59.68%	4,858 3.45%
Total	1,195,742 51.42%	1,014,672 43.63%	115,083 4.95%

City	Stefano Bonaccini	Lucia Borgonzoni	Others
Bologna	135,443 64.84%	65,014 31.12%	8,436 4.04%
Modena	60,349 61.84%	33,027 33.85%	4,206 4.31%
Reggio Emilia	48,786 59.02%	29,563 35.76%	4,318 5.22%
Parma	49,696 53.23%	39,282 42.07%	4,387 4.70%
Forlì	31,635 52.60%	25,565 42.51%	2,945 4.89%
Ravenna	43,912 52.39%	35,309 42.12%	4,604 5.49%
Ferrara	34,020 47.85%	34,162 48.05%	2,915 4.10%
Rimini	36,438 48.75%	34,028 45.53%	4,273 5.72%
Piacenza	20,888 43.59%	25,363 52.93%	1,666 3.44%

=== Turnout ===
Region	Time		
Region	12:00	19:00	23:00
Emilia-Romagna	23.44%	58.82%	67.68%
Province	Time		
Province	12:00	19:00	23:00
Bologna	24.97%	61.88%	70.98%
Ferrara	23.63%	57.94%	65.59%
Forlì-Cesena	23.55%	59.39%	67.54%
Modena	23.96%	59.89%	69.11%
Parma	21.98%	55.12%	64.07%
Piacenza	22.55%	54.38%	62.91%
Ravenna	23.67%	60.67%	69.71%
Reggio Emilia	23.54%	58.83%	67.97%
Rimini	19.87%	54.57%	63.54%
Source: Ministry of the Interior – Turnout

=== Map ===
Seat totals by Province. As this is a PR election, seat totals are determined by popular vote in each province.

=== Elected councillors ===
Constituency	Party	Member
Emilia-Romagna (at-large)	PD	Stefano Bonaccini (Note: As President of the Region.)
Emilia-Romagna (at-large)	Lega	~~Lucia Borgonzoni~~
Emilia-Romagna (at-large)	BP	Marco Mastacchi (Note: Borgonzoni renounced to her Regional Council seat, keeping her seat in the Senate. Mastacchi, of the list "Borgonzoni for President", took over the empty seat.)
Bologna	PD	Raffaele Donini
Bologna	PD	Marilena Pillati
Bologna	PD	Francesca Marchetti
Bologna	PD	Stefano Caliandro
Bologna	PD	Antonio Mumolo
Bologna	Lega	Michele Facci
Bologna	Lega	Daniele Marchetti
Bologna	FdI	Marco Lisei
Bologna	BP	Mauro Felicori
Bologna	ERC	~~Elly Schlein~~; Igor Taruffi (Note: Schlein was elected both in Bologna and Reggio Emilia. Taruffi took over her seat in Bologna.)
Bologna	M5S	Silvia Piccinini
Bologna	FI	~~Vittorio Sgarbi~~; Valentina Castaldini (Note: Sgarbi renounced to his Regional Council seat, keeping his seat in the Chamber of Deputies. Castaldini took over the empty seat.)
Bologna	EV	Silvia Zamboni
Modena	PD	Palma Costi
Modena	PD	Luca Sabattini
Modena	PD	Francesca Maletti
Modena	Lega	Stefano Bargi
Modena	Lega	Simone Pelloni
Modena	FdI	Michele Barcaiuolo
Modena	BP	Giulia Pigoni
Modena	M5S	Giulia Gibertoni

Constituency	Party	Member
Reggio Emilia	PD	Alessio Mammi
Reggio Emilia	PD	Ottavia Soncini
Reggio Emilia	PD	Andrea Costa
Reggio Emilia	Lega	Maura Catellani
Reggio Emilia	Lega	Gabriele Delmonte
Reggio Emilia	BP	Stefania Bondavalli
Reggio Emilia	ERC	Elly Schlein
Piacenza	Lega	Matteo Rancan
Piacenza	Lega	Valentina Stragliati
Piacenza	PD	Katia Tarasconi
Piacenza	FdI	Giancarlo Tagliaferri
Parma	Lega	Fabio Rainieri
Parma	Lega	Emiliano Occhi
Parma	PD	Barabara Lori
Parma	PD	Massimo Iotti
Ferrara	PD	Marcella Zappaterra
Ferrara	PD	Marco Fabbri
Ferrara	Lega	Fabio Bergamini
Forlì-Cesena	PD	Lia Montalti
Forlì-Cesena	PD	Massimo Bulbi
Forlì-Cesena	Lega	Massimiliano Pompignoli

Constituency	Party	Member
Ravenna	PD	Manuela Rontini
Ravenna	PD	Andrea Corsini
Ravenna	Lega	Andrea Liverani
Rimini	PD	Emma Petitti
Rimini	PD	Nadia Rossi
Rimini	Lega	Matteo Montevecchi

== See also ==
- 2020 Calabrian regional election
- 2020 Italian regional elections
