= Tajani =

Tajani is a surname. Notable people with the surname include:

- Antonio Tajani (born 1953), Italian politician, journalist, and former Italian Air Force officer
- Cristina Tajani (born 1978), Italian politician
- Diego Tajani (1827–1921), Italian magistrate and politician
