= Floridia (surname) =

Floridia is an Italian surname. Notable people with the surname include:

- Barbara Floridia (born 1977), Italian politician
- Pietro Floridia (1860–1932), Italian composer
