= Sardines movement =

Political movement in Italy

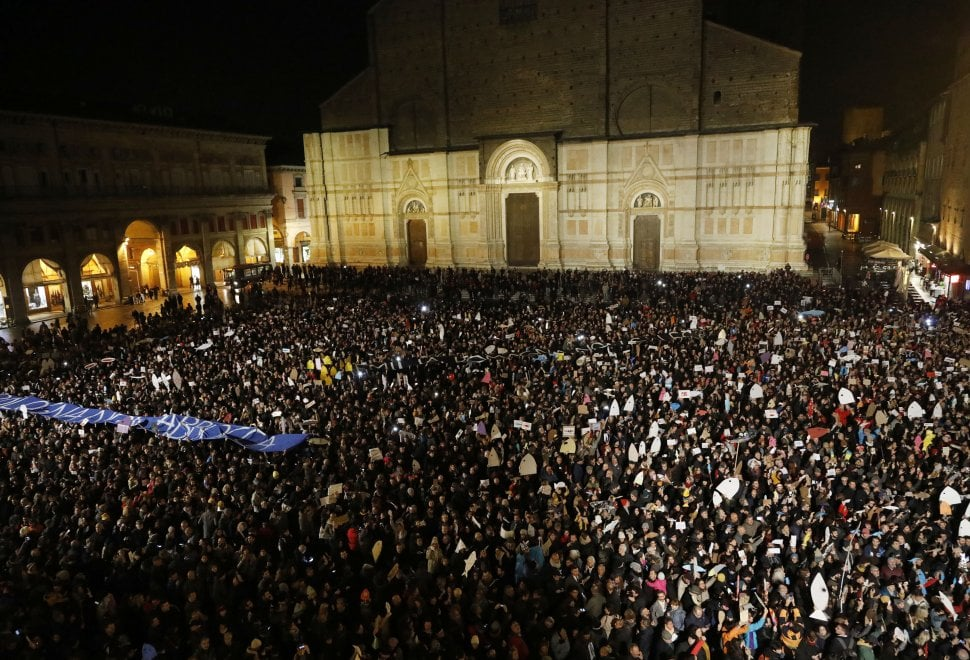
- First Sardines' demonstration in Piazza Maggiore, Bologna
- Date: 14 November 2019 – 26 May 2020 (6 months and 12 days)
- Location: Italy
- Caused by: Rise of Matteo Salvini's support; Anti-immigration policies; Hate speech in politics; Euroscepticism surge
- Methods: Demonstrations; Flash mobs; Online activism

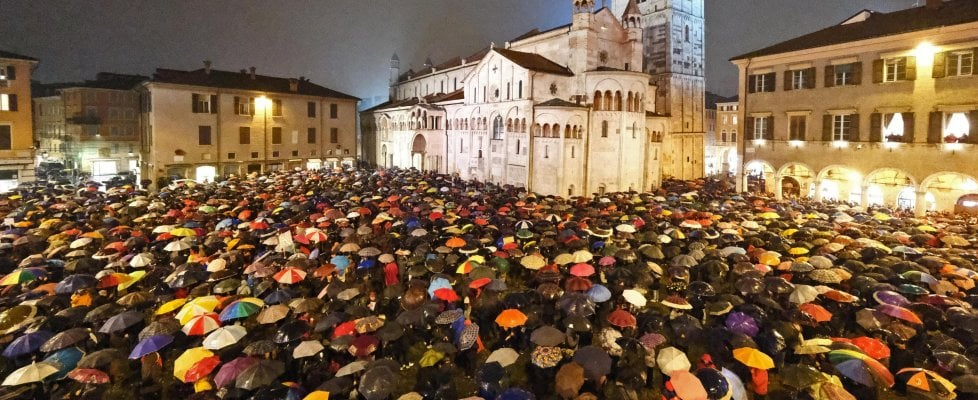
Sardine's rally in Modena

The Sardines movement (Italian: movimento delle sardine), also known as Sardines against Salvini (sardine contro Salvini), was a grassroots political movement, which began in Italy in November 2019.

The movement organized an ongoing series of peaceful demonstrations to protest against the right-wing surge in the country and, more specifically, against the political rhetoric of right-wing leader Matteo Salvini. The name "Sardines" came from the idea of organizing their rallies with high numbers of participants, packed together like sardines in a shoal.

While the movement de facto ended after the centre-left victory in the January 2020 election in Emilia-Romagna, it formally ended in May.

== History ==
=== Birth in Emilia-Romagna ===
The Sardines movement started as a flash mob on 14 November 2019, organized in Piazza Maggiore, the main square of Bologna, Emilia-Romagna. The aim of the event was to contrast the launch of Matteo Salvini's electoral campaign for the 2020 regional election at the PalaDozza in Bologna. The slogan of the event was "Bologna non si Lega", which translates to "Bologna does not tie itself up", but it also plays with the name of Salvini's party, Lega. The flash mob, which was named "6,000 Sardines against Salvini" ("6000 sardine contro Salvini"), (Note: The number in the motto "6,000 Sardines against Salvini" ("6000 sardine contro Salvini") stemmed from the aim to exceed the sitting capacity 5,570 of the PalaDozza in Bologna, where Salvini's rally took place.) was joined by almost 15,000 people, surprising the whole country and receiving a large media coverage.

The movement rose up during the electoral campaign for the 2020 Emilia-Romagna regional election, which has been considered as the first competitive one in the history of the region. Emilia-Romagna has been a stronghold of left-wing parties since the end of the World War II, but in the 2018 general election the centre-right coalition became the largest political force in the region. The Sardines movement started its activity with the aim of preventing a right-wing victory in the January 2020 election.

The first Sardines' rally was warmly welcomed by the Democratic Party (PD), especially by its secretary Nicola Zingaretti, its president and former Prime Minister Paolo Gentiloni and Emilia-Romagna incumbent governor Stefano Bonaccini. Former Prime Minister and PD's founding father, Romano Prodi, stated that the Sardines are "formidable", adding that they must not be neither "colonized" nor "exploited" by any party.

On 18 November, a second Sardines' rally gathered Piazza Grande in Modena, with more than 7,000 people taking part in the event.

=== Spreading through the country ===
In December, the movement spread outside Emilia-Romagna. On 1 December, more than 25,000 people participated in a rally in Piazza Duomo in Milan, while on the previous day, almost 30,000 gathered Piazza della Repubblica in Florence. On 10 December, 40,000 people demonstrated in Turin in Piazza Castello. Other protests have been staged in Naples and Palermo.

On 14 December, one month after their first rally, Sardines organized a demonstration in Rome at Piazza San Giovanni. According to the organizers almost 100,000 people joined the rally. During Rome's demonstration, Sardines' de facto leader, Mattia Santori, presented the movement's proposals to politics, which included, among others, political transparency, condemnation of hate speech, laws against verbal violence and a new immigration policies. Santori especially asked to Giuseppe Conte's government to abolish the so-called "Salvini Decree", a law approved by the previous government, which contained a series of hardline measures that abolished key forms of protection for migrants and made it easier for them to be deported. The decree also suspended the refugee application process of those who were considered "socially dangerous" or who had been convicted of a crime.

On the same day, smaller demonstrations also took place in Brussels, Paris and Berlin.

On 19 January, the movement returned in Bologna, with more than 40,000 people attending a rally in Piazza VIII Agosto. It was the last demonstration before the January 26 regional election and was named "Welcome back to open sea". The rally was characterized by a 6-hour long concert with singers and artists like Afterhours, Subsonica, Marracash, Matilda De Angelis, Skiantos, Casa del vento, Bandabardò, Modena City Ramblers, Marlene Kuntz and Pif.

On 26 January, at the Emilia-Romagna regional election, the PD's candidate Stefano Bonaccini – endorsed by the sardines movement – won with 51.4% of the votes, with a 7.7% margin above the League's candidate Lucia Borgonzoni. Some attributed part of Bonaccini's success to the movement's support and activity.

The Sardines movement formally suspended its activities on 26 May 2020. In 2022 some members of the Sardines, alongside the Purple People, organized some rallies against the candidacy of Silvio Berlusconi in the 2022 Italian Presidential election, though the protests were small and poorly attended.

== Ideology ==
The movement declared itself not linked to any party and to mainly pursue the ideals of anti-fascism and the fight against racial discrimination, as well as the rejection of right-wing populism and verbal violence in Italian politics, which they claim should be legally considered as physical violence. The Sardines movement was generally considered on the left-wing of the political spectrum and was compared to Girotondi and Purple People, two grassroots movements which rose up in the 2000s to protest against then Prime Minister Silvio Berlusconi.

According to some political commentators, the movement would be limited only to a generic critique of the right-wing, with its open opposition to Matteo Salvini, who it depicted as an authoritarian and undemocratic leader. Moreover critics accused the Sardines of supporting the ruling centre-left government of Giuseppe Conte.
