= Felicia Gaudiano =

Italian politician (born 1966)

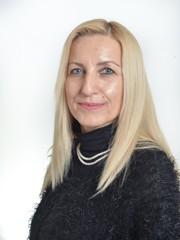
- Gaudiano in 2018

Member of the Senate
- Incumbent
- Assumed office 8 January 2025
- Preceded by: Francesco Castiello
- Constituency: Campania – P02
- In office 23 March 2018 – 12 October 2022
- Constituency: Campania – P03

Personal details
- Born: 9 January 1966 (age 60)
- Party: Five Star Movement

Felicia Gaudiano (born 9 January 1966) is an Italian politician. She has been a member of the Senate since 2025, having previously served from 2018 to 2022. She has served as secretary of the Constitutional Affairs Committee since 2026.
