= No Berlusconi Day =

No Berlusconi Day was a spontaneous mass political event organized by the Purple People protest organisation and held worldwide on December 5, 2009. The protest was organized almost entirely online. The participants were known as Onda Viola ("Purple Wave"), due to the color chosen to represent the event, which was worn by many of the participants.

== Organization ==
On October 6, 2009, the so-called "Lodo Alfano", one of Berlusconi's "ad personam" laws, was judged to be against Italy's Constitutional principles of equality by the Constitutional Court. A small group of bloggers started to comment on the sentence through online social networks, and later proposed a public protest against Silvio Berlusconi.

This proposal was successful, and spread quickly across social media: in less than a week the "No Berlusconi Day" page reached over 20,000 members. The project was joined by people from all over Italy. Local groups were created and people started to become more seriously organized. In late October 2009 an official date was chosen for the protest, December 5, with the main venue as Rome.

Both nationally and internationally, people continued to joining the movement. By early November 2009, the number of registered supporters had increased to 200,000.

== The event ==
'No Berlusconi Day' started on December 5, at 4:00 am, Rome time schedule, when the 'No Berlusconi Day' group gathered in Sydney. The events kept going on for the whole day, because No Berlusconi Day demonstrations took place all over the world: Berlin, Paris, London, Buenos Aires, Madrid, New York City and even Beijing.

The main group of support was planned to finish in Rome.

The participants met in Piazza della Repubblica and started marching at 14:00, towards Piazza S. Giovanni. They passed through Cavour, piazza S. Maria Maggiore and via Merulana. The main stage was built in Piazza San Giovanni, and the first speaker started his speech at 16:30. Many others contributions followed until 18:30, when the veteran songwriter Roberto Vecchioni performed live for the attendees.

== Notable supporters ==
Many prominent public figures supported the No Berlusconi Day; among them were: Antonio Di Pietro, Walter Veltroni, Nanni Moretti, Daniele Luttazzi, Paolo Flores d'Arcais, Beppe Grillo, Dario Fo, Dacia Maraini, Margherita Hack, Piero Ricca, Sabina Guzzanti, Roberto Vecchioni, Moni Ovadia, Salvatore Borsellino, Piergiorgio Odifreddi, Vincenzo Vita

== Media coverage and Parties' attention ==
The event immediately attracted significant media attention, and members of 'No Berlusconi-Day' staff appeared on TV news and also were interviewed by major Italian newspapers. Most of them were ordinary people, rather unheard of by the greater public, but sometimes popular in the online blogging community.

This popular uproar forced the main opposition party in Italy - the Democratic Party, known as the PD- to declare its position regarding support for the No Berlusconi Day. The PD Secretary, Pierluigi Bersani, remained somewhat ambiguous, thus creating much disillusionment in the Party's supporters and staff.
