= San Giacomo degli Schiavoni =

- Comune
- Comune di San Giacomo degli Schiavoni
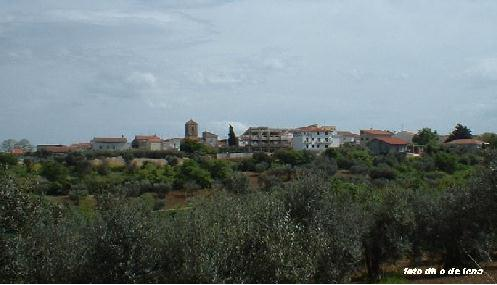
- View of San Giacomo degli Schiavoni

- Location within Italy Location within Molise
- Coordinates: 41°57′48″N 14°56′45″E
- Country: Italy
- Region: Molise
- Province: Campobasso (CB)

Government
  - Mayor: Costanzo Della Porta

Area
  - Total: 11.08 km^{2} (4.28 sq mi)
- Elevation: 169 m (554 ft)

Population (30 November 2017)
  - Total: 1,409
  - Density: 127.2/km^{2} (329.4/sq mi)
- Demonym: Sangiacomesi
- Time zone: UTC+1 (CET)
  - Summer (DST): UTC+2 (CEST)
- Postal code: 86030
- Dialing code: 0875
- Patron saint: St. James
- Saint day: 9 August
- Website: Official website

San Giacomo degli Schiavoni is a comune (municipality) in the Province of Campobasso in the Italian region Molise, located about 50 kilometres (31 mi) northeast of Campobasso.The settlement was formerly inhabited by an Arbëreshë community, who have since assimilated.

San Giacomo degli Schiavoni borders the following municipalities: Guglionesi, Termoli.

== See also ==
- Molise Croats
