= Filippo Sensi =

Italian politician (born 1968)

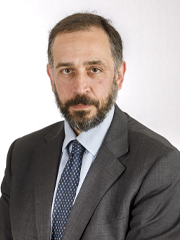
- Sensi in 2023

Member of the Senate of the Republic
- Incumbent
- Assumed office 21 March 2023
- Preceded by: Bruno Astorre
- Constituency: Lazio – 02

Member of the Chamber of Deputies
- In office 23 March 2018 – 12 October 2022
- Constituency: Tuscany – 03

Personal details
- Born: 4 March 1968 (age 58)
- Party: Democratic Party

Filippo Sensi (born 4 March 1968) is an Italian politician serving as a member of the Senate of the Republic since 2023. From 2018 to 2022, he was a member of the Chamber of Deputies.
