= Purple People =

Italian political movement

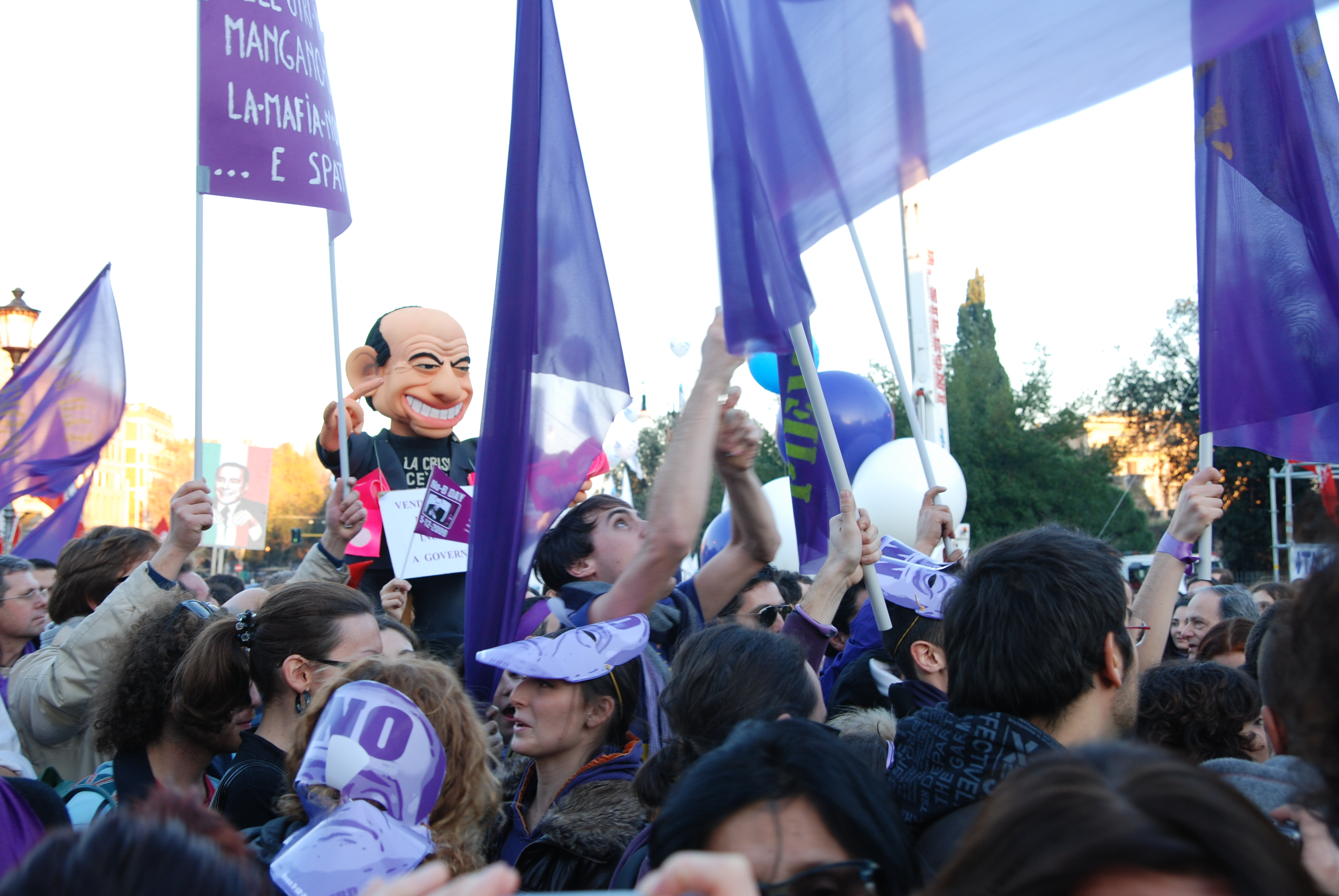
No Berlusconi Day, Rome, 5 December 2009

The Purple People (Italian: Il Popolo Viola) was an Italian mass protest movement who, among other things, called for the resignation of now former Prime Minister Silvio Berlusconi. The movement was disaffected with mainstream Italian politics, and identified themselves at demonstrations and rallies by wearing items of the colour purple, chosen because it was not associated with any major Italian political party. The group originated in October 2009 when a group of bloggers, gravitating around the anonymous figure of "San Precario" (English: "Saint Precarious"), an activist from Catania, Sicily, organised demonstrations using word of mouth, Twitter and Facebook.

In October, 2009, they launched the Facebook page "Una Manifestazione Nazionale per Chiedere le Dimissioni di Berlusconi", (English: "A National Demonstration to Ask for Berlusconi’s Resignation"), announcing a demonstration to take place in Rome on 5 December 2009. The page immediately reached an unexpected consensus. Only a few weeks after, more than 300,000 users had joined the page and had announced via Facebook their presence at the event, which would be called "No Berlusconi Day". Contemporaneously, hundreds of local groups sprung joining the initiative, both inside and outside Italy. Thousands of young Italians, forced by a high level of youth unemployment to leave the Country and move abroad, planned parallel campaigns in cities such as London, New York City, Paris, Sydney, and many others. Since then, thousands of people have attended several subsequent rallies.

The movement declined after the successful campaign of the referendum of 15 June 2011, but, as of May 2016, its Facebook page is still active, counting more than 420,000 users. In 2021-2022 the Purple People, together with members of the Sardines movement, organized some rallies against the candidacy of Silvio Berlusconi in the 2022 Italian Presidential election, though the protests were small and poorly attended.
