= Cuoritaliani =

- Leader: Andrea Augello
- Founded: 2015
- Dissolved: 2018
- Split from: New Centre-Right
- Merged into: Brothers of Italy
- Ideology: Conservatism
- Political position: Centre-right
- National affiliation: Identity and Action (2015–2018)

Cuoritaliani ("Italian Hearts") was a political party based in Lazio, led by Andrea Augello.

== History ==
The party was launched by Senator Andrea Augello and MP Vincenzo Piso in December 2015. In February 2016, the party was joined in the Regional Council of Lazio, with all the four regional councillors from the New Centre-Right and one regional councillor from the mixed group.

In June 2016, the party supported the candidacy of mayor of Nicola Calandrini in the municipal election of Latina (who lost in the ballot), getting 6.6% of the vote and one seat.

In the 2017 local elections the party scored good results in Frosinone (4.3% of the vote), Anagni (5.4%), where it get the election for mayor of its member Daniele Natalia, and Ladispoli (10.7%), where its member Alessandro Grando was elected mayor too.

On the occasion of the 2018 Lazio regional election, following a series of negotiations, Cuoritaliani announced the candidacy of one of its members from the ranks of Forza Italia.

In the 2018 local elections, the results in cities like Anzio and Velletri were really disappointing, causing the anger of Augello who relieved local leaders of their positions. In December 2018, Augello finally announced the merger of Cuoritaliani into Brothers of Italy.
