= Susanna Donatella Campione =

Italian politician (born 1966)

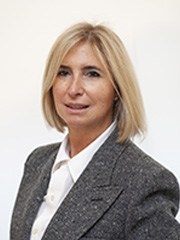
- Campione in 2022

Member of the Senate
- Incumbent
- Assumed office 13 October 2022
- Constituency: Tuscany – P01

Personal details
- Born: 3 February 1966 (age 60)
- Party: Brothers of Italy

Susanna Donatella Campione (born 3 February 1966) is an Italian politician serving as a member of the Senate since 2022. She has been a member of the Parliamentary Assembly of the Organization for Security and Co-operation in Europe since 2022.

== Biography ==
A graduate of the “Luciano Manara” Classical High School in Rome and of the Sapienza University of Rome in 1992 with a degree in law and a thesis on Roman law, she works as both an attorney and a freelance journalist. She writes for Il Tempo, Secolo d'Italia, the monthly magazine Candido, and the daily newspaper Gli Italiani. She has been the author of the column “Sovrana Bellezza” since 2018, an experience she has compiled and published in a book of the same title.
