= Raoul Russo =

Italian politician (born 1971)

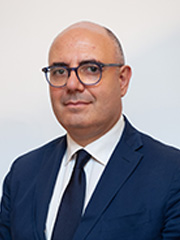
- Russo in 2022

Member of the Senate
- Incumbent
- Assumed office 13 October 2022
- Constituency: Sicily – 02

Personal details
- Born: 3 March 1971 (age 55)
- Party: Brothers of Italy

Raoul Russo (born 3 March 1971) is an Italian politician serving as a member of the Senate since 2022. From 2007 to 2012, he was an assessor of Palermo.
