= Anna Maria Fallucchi =

Italian politician (born 1968)

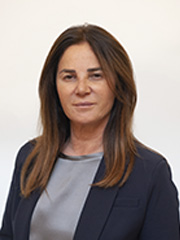
- Fallucchi in 2022

Member of the Senate
- Incumbent
- Assumed office 13 October 2022
- Constituency: Apulia – U01

Personal details
- Born: 19 May 1968 (age 58) Foggia, Apulia, Italy
- Party: Brothers of Italy
- Relatives: Severino Fallucchi (uncle)

Anna Maria Fallucchi (born 19 May 1968) is an Italian politician serving as a member of the Senate since 2022. She is the niece of Severino Fallucchi.
