= Andrea Augello =

Italian politician (1961–2023)

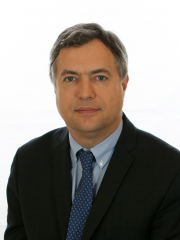

Member of the Senate
- In office 12 October 2022 – 28 April 2023
- Succeeded by: Cinzia Pellegrino
- In office 28 April 2006 – 22 March 2018

Personal details
- Born: 24 February 1961 Novara, Italy
- Died: 28 April 2023 (aged 62) Rome, Italy
- Party: MSI (till 1995); AN (1995–2009); PdL (2009–2013); NCD (2013–2015); IDeA (2015–2018); FdI (2018–2023)

Andrea Augello (24 February 1961 – 28 April 2023) was an Italian politician.

== Political career ==
Born in Novara, as a teenager Augello was a member of Youth Front. He later became a General Labour Union trade unionist, and in 1991 he co-founded and directed for three years a nongovernmental international cooperation organization, Movimento Comunità ("Community Movement"). In 1995 he was elected regional councilor of Lazio with approximately 7,000 votes, within the list of National Alliance; in 2000 he was re-elected with 15,000 votes, and was appointed regional assessor for Budget and Community Resources in the government led by Francesco Storace. In 2005 he was re-elected for the third time in the regional council of Lazio with 25,000 votes.

In the 2006 general election he was elected to the Senate of the Republic for National Alliance and re-confirmed in the 2008 general election for The People of Freedom. In March 2010 he was appointed undersecretary of state of the Ministry of Public Administration and Innovation in the Berlusconi IV cabinet.

In the 2013 general election he was elected for the third time to the Senate. However, on 16 November 2013, following the dissolution of the People of Freedom, he decided to join the New Centre-Right led by Angelino Alfano.

In 2015, he founded a new political movement, named Cuori Italiani, which merged into Brothers of Italy in 2018.
