= Ada Lopreiato =

Italian politician (born 1971)

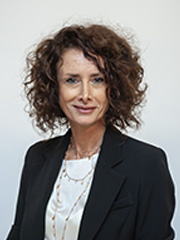
- Lopreiato in 2022

Member of the Senate
- Incumbent
- Assumed office 13 October 2022
- Constituency: Campania – U04

Personal details
- Born: 6 September 1971 (age 54)
- Party: Five Star Movement

Ada Lopreiato (born 6 September 1971) is an Italian politician serving as a member of the Senate since 2022. She has served as group leader of the Five Star Movement in the justice committee since 2022.
