= Gianni Rosa =

Italian politician (born 1965)

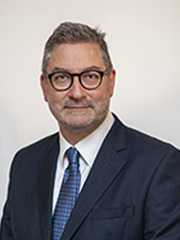
- Rosa in 2022

Member of the Senate
- Incumbent
- Assumed office 13 October 2022
- Constituency: Basilicata – 01

Personal details
- Born: 27 March 1965 (age 61)
- Party: Brothers of Italy

Gianni Rosa (born 27 March 1965) is an Italian politician serving as a member of the Senate since 2022. From 2019 to 2022, he served as assessor for the environment of Basilicata.
