= Dolores Bevilacqua =

Italian politician (born 1974)

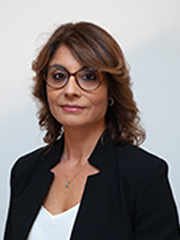
- Bevilacqua in 2022

Member of the Senate
- Incumbent
- Assumed office 13 October 2022
- Constituency: Sicily – U01

Personal details
- Born: 27 August 1974 (age 51)
- Party: Five Star Movement (since 2012)

Dolores Bevilacqua (born 27 August 1974) is an Italian politician serving as a member of the Senate since 2022. From 2022 to 2025, she served as vice president of the committee on European Union affairs.
