= Francesca Tubetti =

Italian politician (born 1982)

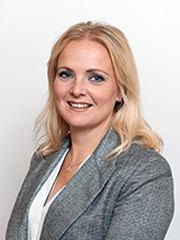
- Tubetti in 2022

Member of the Senate
- Incumbent
- Assumed office 13 October 2022
- Constituency: Friuli-Venezia Giulia – 01

Personal details
- Born: 6 August 1982 (age 43)
- Party: Brothers of Italy (since 2013)

Francesca Tubetti (born 6 August 1982) is an Italian politician serving as a member of the Senate since 2022. From 2016 to 2018, she served as assessor for education of Monfalcone.
