= Vincenza Aloisio =

Italian politician (born 1946)

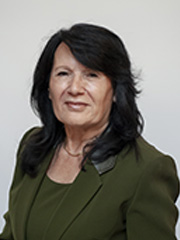

Member of the Senate of the Republic
- Incumbent
- Assumed office 13 October 2022
- Constituency: Campania

Personal details
- Born: Vincenza Aloisio; 15 December 1946 (age 79) Muro Lucano, Italy
- Party: Movimento 5 Stelle
- Education: University of Naples Federico II
- Profession: Physician; manager; teacher

Vincenza Aloisio (born 15 December 1946) is an Italian politician serving as member of the Senate of the Republic for the Five Star Movement since 2022.
