= Daniela Ternullo =

Italian politician (born 1975)

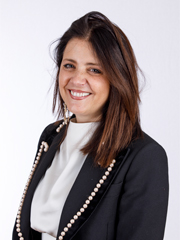
- Ternullo in 2023

Member of the Senate
- Incumbent
- Assumed office 18 January 2023
- Preceded by: Gianfranco Miccichè
- Constituency: Sicily – P01

Personal details
- Born: 9 May 1975 (age 51)
- Party: Forza Italia

Daniela Ternullo (born 9 May 1975) is an Italian politician serving as a member of the Senate since 2023. She was a member of the Sicilian Regional Assembly from April to July 2019 and from 2020 to 2022.
