= Simona Petrucci =

Italian politician

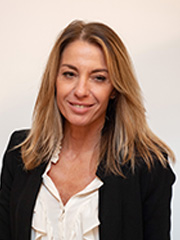

Member of the Senate of the Republic
- Incumbent
- Assumed office 13 October 2022

Personal details
- Born: 17 April 1971 (age 55) Grosseto, Tuscany, Italy
- Party: Brothers of Italy
- Spouse: Claro Mecacci
- Children: 1
- Education: University of Siena
- Profession: Geologist

Simona Petrucci (born 17 April 1971) is an Italian politician who has served as a Senator since 13 October 2022.

== Life and career ==
Born in Grosseto on 17 April 1971, Petrucci graduated in geology from the University of Siena and works as a geologist in her city.

In June 2016, she was appointed assessor with responsibilities for the environment and waste management in the Grosseto municipal administration led by mayor Antonfrancesco Vivarelli Colonna.

In the 2021 Grosseto municipal election, she was elected as a city councilor with 470 votes and was re-confirmed as assessor in the second Vivarelli Colonna municipal government, keeping her responsibilities for the environment and taking on those for maritime and land property.

In the 2022 Italian general election, Petrucci was elected to the Senate of the Republic in the uninominal constituency 1 of Tuscany for Brothers of Italy, obtaining 41.96%.
