= Domenica Spinelli =

Italian politician (born 1969)

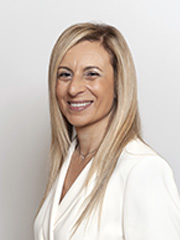
- Spinelli in 2022

Member of the Senate
- Incumbent
- Assumed office 13 October 2022
- Constituency: Emilia-Romagna – P02

Personal details
- Born: 8 January 1969 (age 57)
- Party: Brothers of Italy

Domenica Spinelli (born 8 January 1969) is an Italian politician serving as a member of the Senate since 2022. From 2012 to 2022, she served as mayor of Coriano.
