= Antonella Zedda =

Italian politician (born 1976)

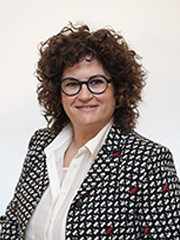
- Zedda in 2022

Member of the Senate
- Incumbent
- Assumed office 13 October 2022
- Constituency: Sardinia – 01

Personal details
- Born: 17 January 1976 (age 50)
- Party: Brothers of Italy (since 2012)

Antonella Zedda (born 17 January 1976) is an Italian politician serving as a member of the Senate since 2022. She has served as deputy group leader of Brothers of Italy since 2022.
