= Andrea De Priamo =

Italian politician (born 1971)

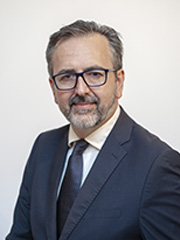
- De Priamo in 2022

Member of the Senate of the Republic
- Incumbent
- Assumed office 13 October 2022
- Constituency: Lazio

Personal details
- Born: 24 May 1971 (age 55)
- Party: Brothers of Italy

Andrea De Priamo (born 24 May 1971) is an Italian politician of Brothers of Italy who was elected member of the Senate of the Republic in 2022. From 2008 to 2022, he served in the City Council of Rome.

== Biography ==
Born in Rome, where he earned his high school diploma from the “Primo Levi” Scientific High School and a master’s degree in law from the Sapienza University of Rome with a thesis in constitutional law on the municipal level of local autonomy.

A member of the Italian Social Movement, where he served as secretary of the Garbatella-Eur chapter of its youth organization (Fronte della Gioventù), he supported Gianfranco Fini’s “Fiuggi Turnaround,” which led to the movement’s dissolution and its merger into the National Alliance (Italy), where he served as a party delegate to the national convention and became president of the Garbatella local chapter.

In the 2008 local elections, he ran for the Rome City Council, on the lists of The People of Freedom party in support of center-right mayoral candidate Gianni Alemanno. He was elected city councilor and re-elected in the 2016 and 2021 local elections, serving as vice president of the Rome City Council from July 7, 2016, to October 2, 2018.

In the 2022 early general election, he ran for the Senate of the Republic (Italy) on the Fratelli d'Italia list in the Lazio 1 multi-member constituency and was elected to the Senate. During the 19th legislature, he served as chairman of the Parliamentary Commission of Inquiry into the disappearances of Emanuela Orlandi and Mirella Gregori and as a member of the 1st Committee on Constitutional Affairs, the 8th Committee on the Environment, Ecological Transition, Energy, Public Works, Communications, and Technological Innovation, and the Parliamentary Commission of Inquiry into Illegal Activities Related to the Waste Cycle and Other Environmental and Agri-Food Offenses.
