= Elena Leonardi =

Italian politician (born 1975)

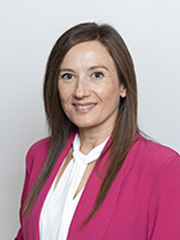
- Leonardi in 2022

Member of the Senate
- Incumbent
- Assumed office 13 October 2022
- Constituency: Marche – U01

Personal details
- Born: 3 May 1975 (age 51)
- Party: Brothers of Italy (since 2012)

Elena Leonardi (born 3 May 1975) is an Italian politician serving as a member of the Senate since 2022. From 2015 to 2022, she was a member of the Legislative Assembly of Marche.
