= Ernesto Rapani =

Italian politician (born 1967)

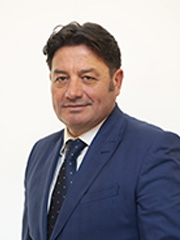
- Rapani in 2022

Member of the Senate
- Incumbent
- Assumed office 13 October 2022
- Constituency: Calabria – 01

Personal details
- Born: 2 May 1967 (age 58)
- Party: Brothers of Italy (since 2013)

Ernesto Rapani (born 2 May 1967) is an Italian politician serving as a member of the Senate since 2022. From 2009 to 2014, he was a provincial councillor of Cosenza.
