= Gianni Berrino =

Italian politician (born 1964)

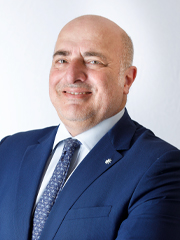
- Berrino in 2022

Member of the Senate
- Incumbent
- Assumed office 13 October 2022
- Constituency: Liguria – 01

Personal details
- Born: 7 May 1964 (age 62)
- Party: Brothers of Italy (since 2012)

Giovanni Berrino (born 7 May 1964) is an Italian politician serving as a member of the Senate since 2022. From 2015 to 2022, he served as assessor for tourism, labour and transport of Liguria.

== Biography ==
He began his political career in the ranks of the Italian Social Movement, which, following Gianfranco Fini’s “Fiuggi Turn” in 1995, agreed to dissolve and merge into the National Alliance (Italy) (AN), with which he served on several occasions as a city council member, city councilor, and deputy mayor of Sanremo.

In 2009, he joined the merger of AN into the The People of Freedom party, but in December 2012 he took part in the split led by Giorgia Meloni, Ignazio La Russa, and Guido Crosetto that led to the founding of Fratelli d'Italia (FdI), under whose banner he ran for mayor of Sanremo in the 2014 municipal elections in Liguria, supported by Forza Italia, Fratelli d'Italia - Alleanza Nazionale, and the Sanremesi civic list, garnering 28.53% of the vote in the first round and advancing to the runoff against center-left candidate Alberto Biancheri (47.35%), where, after securing an electoral alliance with the Lega Nord-Basta €uro and Ricostruiamo Sanremo lists, he garnered 34.98% of the vote but was defeated by Biancheri (65.02%). He was nevertheless elected to the City Council as an unsuccessful mayoral candidate, serving as vice president and group leader for FdI in the City Council.

In the 2015 regional elections in Liguria, he was elected to the Regional Council of Liguria because he was included on President Giovanni Toti ticket, even though he would not have been elected in the province of Imperia with only 1,309 votes. Re-elected in 2020 with 3,720 votes, he served as regional councilor for tourism, labor, and transportation from 2015 to 2022.

In the 2022 early general election, he ran for the Senate of the Republic (Italy) in the single-member district of Liguria - 01 (Genoa) and was elected senator for Fratelli d'Italia with 44.93% of the vote (equivalent to 154,651 coalition votes, of which 5,441 were cast directly for him), defeating his center-left opponent Sandra Zampa by a margin of over 50,000 votes.

In January 2025, he was appointed deputy regional coordinator of the party in Liguria, with responsibility for the province of Imperia.
