= Carlo Cottarelli =

Italian economist

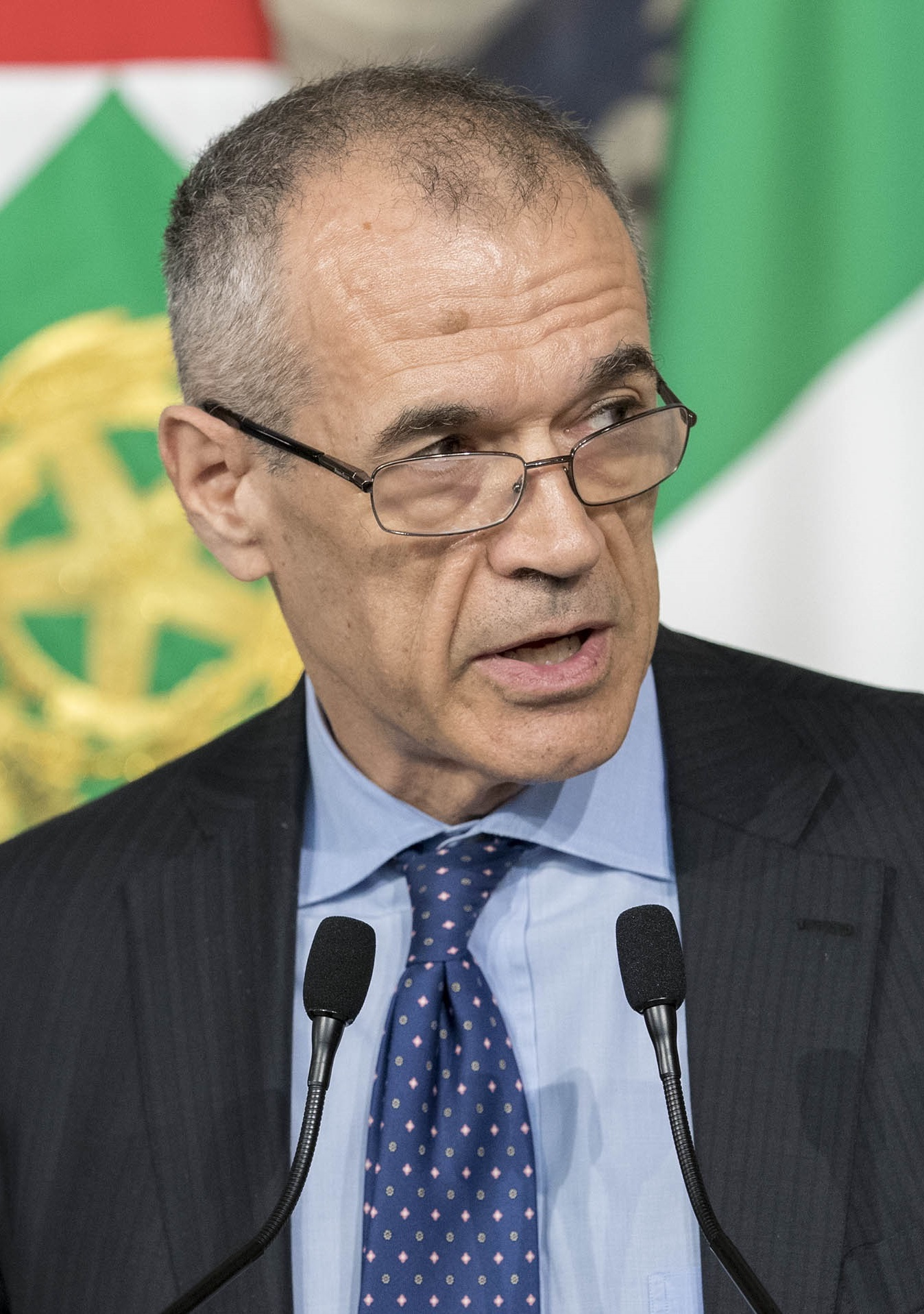

Member of the Senate of the Republic
- In office 13 October 2022 – 31 May 2023
- Succeeded by: Cristina Tajani
- Constituency: Lombardy

Director of the Fiscal Affairs Department of the International Monetary Fund
- In office 6 November 2008 – 23 October 2013
- Succeeded by: Vítor Gaspar

Personal details
- Born: 18 August 1954 (age 72) Cremona, Italy
- Party: Independent
- Spouse: Miria Pigato
- Children: 2
- Education: University of Siena; London School of Economics
- Occupation: Academic, economist

Carlo Cottarelli (Italian pronunciation: [ˈkarlo kottaˈrɛlli]; born 18 August 1954) is an Italian economist and former director of the International Monetary Fund.

On 28 May 2018 he was designated Prime Minister of Italy by President Sergio Mattarella, to lead a caretaker government that would bring Italy toward new elections. However, after few days, the Five Star Movement and the League reached an agreement and a new government, led by Giuseppe Conte, was formed.

== Early life and career ==
Carlo Cottarelli was born in Cremona, Lombardy, in 1954. He graduated in Economics and Banking at the University of Siena and received a master's degree in economics at the London School of Economics. From 1981 to 1987, he worked in the Research Department of the Bank of Italy and in Eni from 1987 to 1988.

Starting in September 1988 he began working for the International Monetary Fund, in which he was part of several departments: the European Department (of which he was Senior Advisor responsible for supervising the IMF's activities in a dozen countries), the Monetary and Capital Markets Department, the Strategy, Policy, and Review Department (of which he was vice president too) and From November 2008 to 2013 he was appointed Director of the Fiscal Affairs Department of the IMF. He was also responsible for the development and publication of Fiscal Monitor, one of the three semi-annual publications on economic developments in various economic sectors. He later returned to the IMF to serve as executive director for Italy and a group of other countries including Greece. During this period, Cottarelli wrote several essays on fiscal and policy, fiscal institutions.

In November 2013 he was appointed by the government of Enrico Letta, Extraordinary Commissioner for the Spending Review. The tasks of the Extraordinary Commissioner regarded the expenses of public administrations, public utilities, as well as of the companies controlled directly or indirectly by public administrations that do not issue financial instruments listed on regulated markets. This office gave him the nickname "Mr. Spending Review", with which he became quite known in Italy. He was also known by the press as "Mr. Scissors," due to his frequent habit of cutting public spending, while serving as an official in the IMF.

On 1 November 2014, he was appointed, by the cabinet of Matteo Renzi, executive director of the International Monetary Fund Board. For this reason, on October 30, 2014, he left the commission of expenditure's review. In an interview released shortly before the term of the office, he spoke of the faced difficulties relating to the political and the bureaucratic system.

From 30 October 2017 he is the Director of the Observatory on the Italian Public Accounts (CPI) of the Catholic University of Milan.

== Political career ==
=== 2018 government formation ===
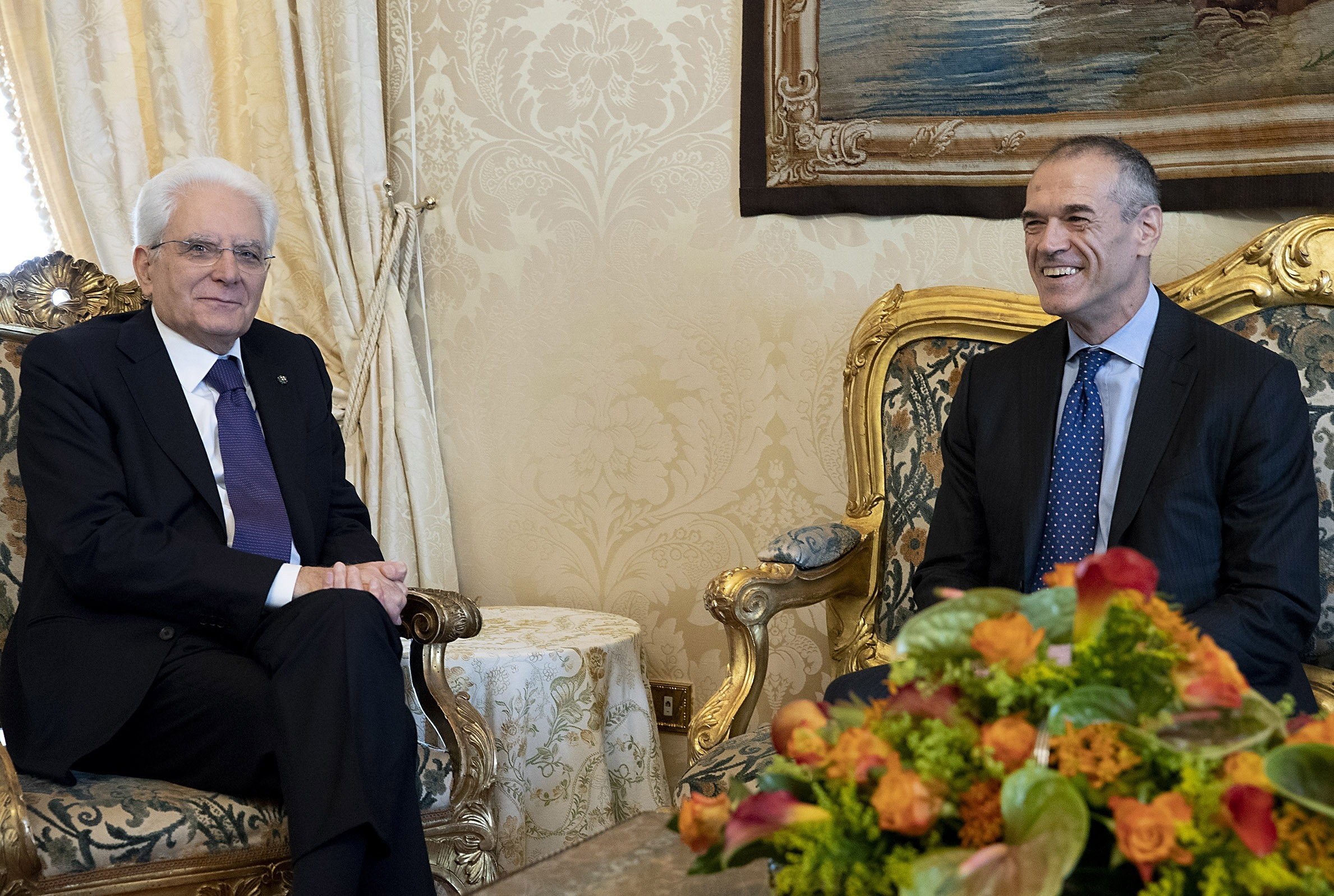
Cottarelli with President Sergio Mattarella at the Quirinal Palace.

The March 2018 election resulted in a hung parliament, with no coalitions able to form a majority of seats in both the Chamber of Deputies and the Senate of the Republic. The election was seen as a backlash against the establishment with the Five Star Movement and the League becoming respectively the first and third largest parties in the Parliament.

After weeks of political deadlock, Mattarella gave the private law professor Giuseppe Conte the task of forming a new cabinet at the head of a populist coalition formed by the Five Star Movement and the League, who had reached a substantial agreement on a government agenda. However, on 27 May 2018, Conte renounced the office due to contrasts between the League's leader Matteo Salvini and President Sergio Mattarella. Salvini proposed the university professor Paolo Savona as Minister of Economy and Finances, but Mattarella strongly opposed him, as the media considered Savona too Eurosceptic and anti-German. In his speech after Conte's resignation, Mattarella declared that the two parties wanted to bring Italy out of the Eurozone, and as the guarantor of Italian Constitution and country's interest and stability he could not allow this. On the following day, Mattarella gave Cottarelli the task of forming a new government.

In the statement released after the designation, Cottarelli specified that in case of confidence by the Parliament, he would contribute to the approval of the budget law for 2019, then the Parliament would be dissolved and a new general election would be called for the beginning of 2019. In the absence of confidence, the government would deal only with the so-called current affairs and lead the country toward new elections after August 2018. Cottarelli also guaranteed the neutrality of the government and the commitment not to run for the next election. He ensured a prudent management of Italian national debt and the defense of national interests through a constructive dialogue with the European Union. On 28 May 2018, the Democratic Party (PD) announced that it would abstain from voting the confidence to Cottarelli, while the Five Star Movement and the center-right parties Forza Italia (FI), Brothers of Italy (FdI) and the League announced their vote against.

Cottarelli was expected to submit his list of ministers for approval to President Mattarella on 29 May. However, on 29 May and 30 May he held only informal consultations with the President. According to the Italian media, he was facing difficulties due to the unwillingness of several potential candidates to serve as ministers in his cabinet and may even renounce. Meanwhile, Matteo Salvini and Luigi Di Maio announced their willingness to restart the negotiations to form a political government, and Giorgia Meloni, leader of FdI, gave her support to the initiative. On 31 May, when M5S and the League declared of having reached an agreement regarding a new cabinet, Cottarelli resigned from his position.

=== Member of the Senate ===
In 2022, Cottarelli was candidate of the centre-left coalition to the Senate of the Republic, being elected in the multi-member district of Lombardy for the Democratic Party (PD). However, in May 2023, he resigned from his post due to contrasts with the new leader of the party, Elly Schlein.

== Other activities ==
- Istituto Affari Internazionali (IAI), Member of the Board
- Italy-USA Foundation, Member of the Board

== Personal life ==
Cottarelli married Miria Pigato, an economist and manager of the World Bank Group. Pigato is an expert in the economy of the Sub-Saharan Africa. They have two children.

== Authored books ==
- La lista della spesa. La verità sulla spesa pubblica italiana e su come si può tagliare. Rome: Feltrinelli. 2015. ISBN 978-88-07-17291-5.
- Il macigno. Perché il debito pubblico ci schiaccia e come si fa a liberarsene. Rome: Feltrinelli. 2016. ISBN 978-88-07-17302-8.
- I sette peccati capitali dell'economia italiana. Rome: Feltrinelli. 2016. ISBN 978-88-07-17332-5.
- Pachidermi e pappagalli. Tutte le bufale sull'economia a cui continuiamo a credere. Rome: Feltrinelli. 2019. ISBN 978-88-07-17367-7.
