= Giovanni Satta =

Italian politician (born 1965)

Member of the Senate
- Incumbent
- Assumed office 13 October 2022
- Constituency: Sardinia – P01

Personal details
- Born: 22 January 1965 (age 61) Rome, Italy
- Party: Brothers of Italy

Giovanni Satta (born 22 January 1965) is an Italian politician serving as a member of the Senate since 2022.
