= Orfeo Mazzella =

Italian politician (born 1965)

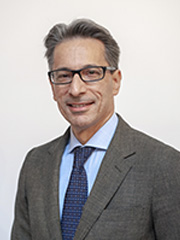
- Mazzella in 2022

Member of the Senate
- Incumbent
- Assumed office 13 October 2022
- Constituency: Campania – U06

Personal details
- Born: 30 September 1965 (age 60)
- Party: Five Star Movement

Orfeo Mazzella (born 30 September 1965) is an Italian politician serving as a member of the Senate since 2022. He has served as deputy chairman of the Social Affairs, Health, Public and Private Employment and Social Security Committee since 2025.
