= Matteo Gelmetti =

Italian politician (born 1975)

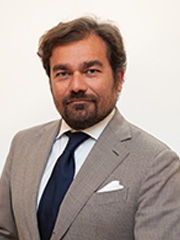
- Gelmetti in 2022

Member of the Senate
- Incumbent
- Assumed office 13 October 2022
- Constituency: Veneto – P02

Personal details
- Born: 12 June 1975 (age 51)
- Party: Brothers of Italy (since 2020)

Matteo Gelmetti (born 12 June 1975) is an Italian politician serving as a member of the Senate since 2022. He has served as secretary of the inquiry committee on the Schengen Agreement, Europol and immigration since 2023, and as secretary of the inquiry committee on the banking, financial and insurance system since 2025.

== Biography ==
He became involved in politics at the age of 15 when he joined the Youth Front (Italy).

He was first elected as a council member for Verona's 6th district in 1994 as a member of the Italian Social Movement.

In 2007, as a member of the National Alliance (Italy), he became president of the first district.

He was re-elected as a district councilor in 2012 with the Federico Sboarina party. He later joined the civic movement Battiti per Verona.

He then joined Fratelli d'Italia.

Since 2019, he has been a member of the board of directors of Veronafiere, serving as vice president. He was reappointed in 2022.

In the 2022 general election, he was elected to the Senate as a candidate for Brothers of Italy in the Padova-Verona-Vicenza multi-member district.
