= Costanzo Della Porta =

Italian politician (born 1975)

Member of the Senate
- Incumbent
- Assumed office 13 October 2022
- Constituency: Molise – 01

Personal details
- Born: 29 October 1975 (age 50)
- Party: Brothers of Italy (since 2012)

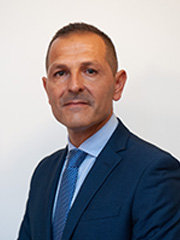
Costanzo Della Porta, Senate, 19th Legislature.

Costanzo Della Porta (born 29 October 1975) is an Italian politician serving as a member of the Senate since 2022. He has served as mayor of San Giacomo degli Schiavoni since 2016.

== Biography ==
Born in Termoli in 1975 and currently residing in San Giacomo degli Schiavoni, he earned a law degree from the University of Molise and practices law.

He is married and has two daughters.
