= Antonio Nicita =

Italian politician (born 1968)

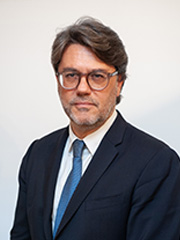
- Nicita in 2022

Member of the Senate
- Incumbent
- Assumed office 13 October 2022
- Constituency: Sicily – 02

Personal details
- Born: 10 February 1968 (age 58) Syracuse
- Party: Democratic Party
- Parent: Santi Nicita (father)
- Relatives: Stefania Prestigiacomo (cousin)

Antonio Nicita (born 10 February 1968) is an Italian politician serving as a member of the Senate since 2022. He is the son of Santi Nicita and the cousin of Stefania Prestigiacomo.
