= Guido Quintino Liris =

Italian politician (born 1979)

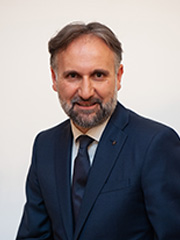
- Liris in 2022

Member of the Senate
- Incumbent
- Assumed office 13 October 2022
- Constituency: Abruzzo – 01

Personal details
- Born: 12 June 1979 (age 46)
- Party: Brothers of Italy (since 2019)

Guido Quintino Liris (born 12 June 1979) is an Italian politician serving as a member of the Senate since 2022. From 2019 to 2023, he was an assessor of Abruzzo.
