= Paola Ambrogio =

Italian politician (born 1970)

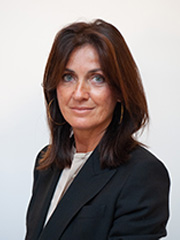
- Ambrogio in 2022

Member of the Senate
- Incumbent
- Assumed office 13 October 2022
- Constituency: Piedmont – 02

Personal details
- Born: 2 December 1970 (age 55) Turin, Italy
- Party: Brothers of Italy (since 2012)

Paola Ambrogio (born 2 December 1970) is an Italian politician serving as a member of the Senate since 2022. She was a municipal councillor of Turin from 2011 to 2016 and from 2021 to 2023.

== Biography ==
After earning a law degree from the University of Turin in 1998, she worked as a freelance journalist for the Moncalieri-based weekly Il Mercoledì and the magazine Oggi Noi.

In addition, after working with the National Alliance (Italy) council group, he has served as an official with the Regional Council of Piedmont since 2000.
