= Sabrina Licheri =

Italian politician (born 1971)

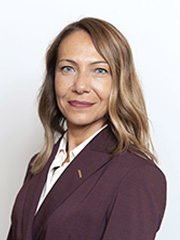
- Licheri in 2022

Member of the Senate
- Incumbent
- Assumed office 13 October 2022
- Constituency: Sardinia – P01

Personal details
- Born: 4 June 1971 (age 55)
- Party: Five Star Movement

Sabrina Licheri (born 4 June 1971) is an Italian politician serving as a member of the Senate since 2022. From 2018 to 2022, she served as mayor of Assemini.
