= Barbara Floridia =

Italian politician

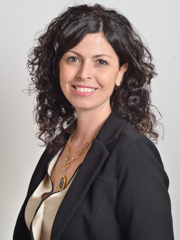

Member of the Senate
- Incumbent
- Assumed office 23 March 2018

Personal details
- Born: 5 February 1977 (age 49) Messina, Italy
- Party: Five Star Movement
- Education: University of Messina
- Occupation: Teacher

Barbara Floridia (born 5 February 1977) is an Italian politician who currently serves as a Senator.

She has been undersecretary of state at the Ministry of Education, University and Research in the Draghi government from 2021 to 2022.

== See also ==
- List of current Italian senators
