= Filippo Melchiorre =

Italian politician (born 1966)

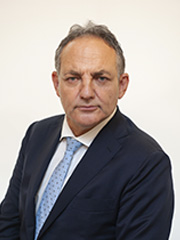
- Melchiorre in 2022

Member of the Senate
- Incumbent
- Assumed office 13 October 2022
- Constituency: Apulia – 03

Personal details
- Born: 7 May 1966 (age 59)
- Party: Brothers of Italy (since 2012)

Filippo Melchiorre (born 7 May 1966) is an Italian politician serving as a member of the Senate since 2022. From 2004 to 2024, he was a municipal councillor of Bari.
