= Maria Nocco =

Italian politician (born 1974)

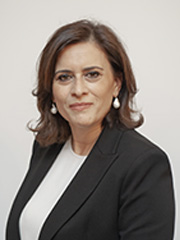
- Nocco in 2022

Member of the Senate
- Incumbent
- Assumed office 13 October 2022
- Constituency: Apulia – U04

Personal details
- Born: 12 December 1974 (age 51)
- Party: Brothers of Italy (since 2013)

Vita Maria Nocco (born 12 December 1974) is an Italian politician serving as a member of the Senate since 2022. She has served as deputy leader of Brothers of Italy in the province of Bari since 2024.

== Biography ==
Born in Santeramo in Colle (BA), she obtained a diploma in accounting from the "Nicola Dell'Andro" technical commercial institute in 1993, and graduated in economics and commerce from the University of Bari in 2000.

She initially worked as an employee and later as an administrator in the family's agrifood companies.

=== Political activity ===
She began her political activity in the Italian Social Movement, later joining National Alliance led by Gianfranco Fini, The People of Freedom, and finally Brothers of Italy (FdI).

In the 2018 general election, she was a candidate for the Senate, running on the FdI list in the Puglia - 01 multi-member constituency in second place, but was not elected.

In the 2022 snap general election, she was re-nominated for the Senate in the Puglia - 04 single-member constituency (Taranto), supported by the centre-right coalition as a Brothers of Italy candidate. She was elected senator with 42.51% of the vote, defeating Five Star Movement candidate Roberto Fusco (30.03%) and centre-left coalition candidate Maria Grazia Cascarano, running for the Democratic Party (18.96%). During the 19th legislature, she has served on the 5th Budget Committee, the Parliamentary Committee for the Simplification of Legislation, and the Parliamentary Inquiry Committee on Working Conditions in Italy, Exploitation and Workplace Safety.

In February 2024, she became deputy provincial coordinator of FdI in Bari.

== Personal life ==
She is married to Michele Laquale, who is also a member of Brothers of Italy and a former regional party official in Apulia.
