= Paola Mancini =

Italian politician (born 1973)

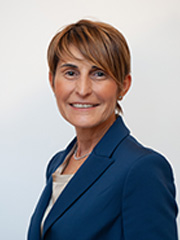
- Mancini in 2022

Member of the Senate
- Incumbent
- Assumed office 13 October 2022
- Constituency: Lombardia – P02

Personal details
- Born: 4 November 1973 (age 52)
- Party: Brothers of Italy

Paola Mancini (born 4 November 1973) is an Italian politician serving as a member of the Senate since 2022. From 2018 to 2023, she was an assessor of Castel Goffredo.

== Biography ==
She served as a provincial councilor for Province of Mantua, as well as a city councilor and council member for Castel Goffredo.

In the 2022 general election, she was elected to the Senate as a member of Brothers of Italy in the multi-member district of Milan.

In the 2023 municipal elections, she was elected as a minority city council member for the city of Castel Goffredo.
