= Giorgio Salvitti =

Italian politician (born 1968)

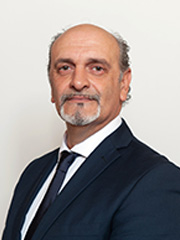
- Salvitti in 2022

Member of the Senate
- Incumbent
- Assumed office 13 October 2022
- Constituency: Piedmont – P02

Personal details
- Born: 10 February 1968 (age 58)
- Party: Brothers of Italy

Giorgio Salvitti (born 10 February 1968) is an Italian politician serving as a member of the Senate since 2022. From 2006 to 2014, he served as deputy mayor of Colleferro.

== Biography ==
From 1997 to 2001, he served as a city council member in Colleferro for National Alliance (Italy); from 2001 to 2005, he served as city councilor for commerce and economic development; and from 2006 to 2014, he served as city councilor for urban planning and deputy mayor. He has been a member of Fratelli d’Italia since the party’s founding in 2013 and became a member of its National Executive Committee in 2017.
