= Sigismondo (given name) =

Sigismondo is a given name. Notable people with the name include:

- Sigismondo Benini (fl. 18th century), Italian painter
- Sigismondo Betti (1700–1783), Italian painter
- Sigismondo Boldoni (1597–1630), Italian writer, philosopher, and physician
- Sigismondo Caula (1637–1724), Italian painter
- Sigismondo Coccapani (1585-1643), Italian painter
- Sigismondo d'Este (1433–1507), second son of Niccolò III d'Este and his third wife Ricciarda di Saluzzo
- Sigismondo d'Este (1480–1524), youngest son of Ercole I d'Este, Duke of Ferrara, and Eleanor of Aragon
- Sigismondo d'India (c. 1582–1629), Italian composer
- Sigismondo di Giovanni (died 1540), Italian architect
- Sigismondo Foschi, also called Sigismondo da Faenza (fl. 1520–1532), Italian painter
- Sigismondo Gonzaga (1469–1525), Italian cardinal
- Sigismondo Isei (1620–1670), Italian Roman Catholic prelate
- Sigismondo Malatesta (1498–1553), Italian condottiero
- Sigismondo Pandolfo Malatesta (1417–1468), Italian condottiero and nobleman
- Sigismondo Polcastro (1384–1473), Italian physician and natural philosopher
- Sigismondo Saraceno (died 1585), Italian Roman Catholic prelate
- Sigismondo Savona (1835–1908), Maltese educator and politician

== See also ==
- San Sigismondo, Roman Catholic religious complex in Cremona, northern Italy
- Sigismondo, opera by Rossini
