= Sandro Sisler =

Italian politician (born 1968)

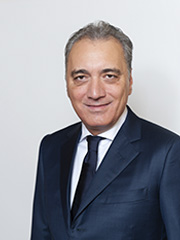
- Sisler in 2022

Member of the Senate
- Incumbent
- Assumed office 13 October 2022
- Constituency: Lombardy – 02

Personal details
- Born: 12 April 1968 (age 58)
- Party: Brothers of Italy

Sandro Sisler (born 12 April 1968) is an Italian politician serving as a member of the Senate since 2022. He has served as vice president of the justice committee since 2022.
