= Domenico Matera =

Italian politician (born 1965)

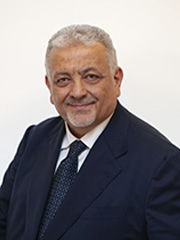
- Matera in 2022

Member of the Senate
- Incumbent
- Assumed office 13 October 2022
- Constituency: Campania – P02

Personal details
- Born: 19 May 1965 (age 61)
- Party: Brothers of Italy

Domenico Matera (born 19 May 1965) is an Italian politician serving as a member of the Senate since 2022. He has served as secretary of the Senate since 2025. From 2008 to 2023, he served as mayor of Bucciano.
