= Cinzia Pellegrino =

Italian politician (born 1975)

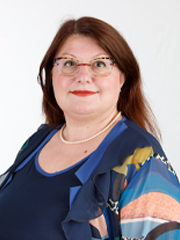

Member of the Senate
- Incumbent
- Assumed office 9 May 2023
- Preceded by: Andrea Augello
- Constituency: Lazio – 02

Personal details
- Born: 17 July 1975 (age 51)
- Party: Brothers of Italy (since 2012)

Cinzia Pellegrino (born 17 July 1975) is an Italian politician serving as a member of the Senate since 2023. She is the coordinator of the victim protection department of Brothers of Italy.

== Biography ==
An active member and leader of Azione Universitaria, she was first a member of National Alliance (Italy), then of Popolo della Libertà, before finally joining Brothers of Italy.

In the 2022 general election, she ran for a seat in the Senate of the Republic on the Fratelli d'Italia ticket in the Lazio district, finishing as the highest-ranking candidate among those not elected. She took office as a senator on May 9, 2023, following the death of her party colleague Andrea Augello.
