= Bruno Astorre =

Italian politician (1963–2023)

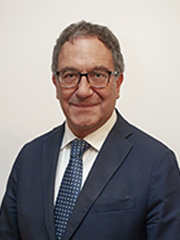
- Astorre in 2022

Member of the Senate
- In office 15 March 2013 – 3 March 2023
- Constituency: Lazio

President of the Regional Council of Lazio
- In office 16 September 2009 – 15 March 2010
- Preceded by: Guido Milana
- Succeeded by: Mario Abbruzzese

Personal details
- Born: 11 March 1963 Rome, Italy
- Died: 3 March 2023 (aged 59) Rome, Italy
- Party: DC (till 1994); PPI (1994–2002); The Daisy (2002–2007); PD (2007–2023)
- Education: LUISS Guido Carli
- Occupation: Accountant

Bruno Astorre (11 March 1963 – 3 March 2023) was an Italian accountant and politician. A member of the Democratic Party, he served in the Senate of the Republic from 2013 to 2023.

Astorre died by suicide, jumping to his death in Rome on 3 March 2023 at the age of 59.
