= Pierantonio Zanettin =

Italian politician (born 1961)

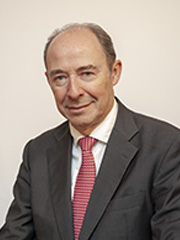
- Zanettin in 2022

Member of the Senate
- Incumbent
- Assumed office 13 October 2022
- Constituency: Veneto – 02
- In office 15 March 2013 – 25 September 2014
- Succeeded by: Bartolomeo Amidei
- Constituency: Veneto
- In office 12 July 2006 – 28 April 2008
- Preceded by: Giancarlo Galan
- Constituency: Veneto

Member of the Chamber of Deputies
- In office 23 March 2018 – 12 October 2022
- Constituency: Veneto 2 – 05
- In office 30 May 2001 – 27 April 2006
- Preceded by: Daniele Apolloni
- Constituency: Thiene

Personal details
- Born: 13 July 1961 (age 64)
- Party: Forza Italia

Pierantonio Zanettin (born 13 July 1961) is an Italian politician. He has been a member of the Senate since 2022, having previously served from 2006 to 2008 and from 2013 to 2014. He was a member of the Chamber of Deputies from 2001 to 2006 and from 2018 to 2022. From 2014 to 2018, he was a member of the High Council of the Judiciary.
