= Cristina Tajani =

Italian politician (born 1978)

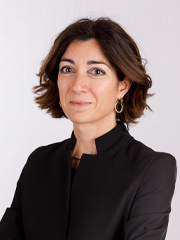
- Tajani in 2023

Member of the Senate
- Incumbent
- Assumed office 31 May 2023
- Preceded by: Carlo Cottarelli
- Constituency: Lombardy – 02

Personal details
- Born: 28 November 1978 (age 47)
- Party: Democratic Party (since 2018)

Cristina Tajani (born 28 November 1978) is an Italian politician serving as a member of the Senate since 2023. From 2022 to 2023, she served as president of ANPAL Servizi.
