= Francesco Silvestro =

Italian politician (born 1971)

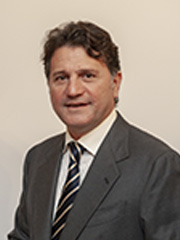
- Silvestro in 2022

Member of the Senate
- Incumbent
- Assumed office 13 October 2022
- Constituency: Campania – P01

Personal details
- Born: 22 October 1971 (age 54) Arzano, Italy
- Party: Forza Italia (since 2013)
- Education: Mercatorum University (Honorary degree)

Francesco Silvestro (born 22 October 1971) is an Italian politician serving as a member of the Senate since 2022. From 2012 to 2014, he served as president of the municipal council of Arzano.
