= Michele Barcaiuolo =

Italian politician (born 1979)

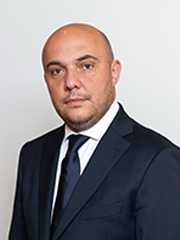
- Barcaiuolo in 2022

Member of the Senate of the Republic
- Incumbent
- Assumed office 13 October 2022
- Constituency: Emilia-Romagna

Personal details
- Born: 7 February 1979 (age 47) Modena, Italy
- Party: Brothers of Italy

Michele Barcaiuolo (born 7 February 1979) is an Italian politician of Brothers of Italy who was elected member of the Senate of the Republic in 2022. He previously served on the city council of Modena from 2004 to 2014, and in the Legislative Assembly of Emilia-Romagna from 2020 to 2022.
