= Francesco Castiello =

Italian politician (1942–2024)

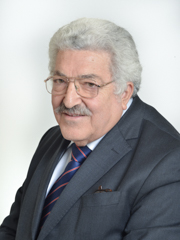
Franceso Castiello

Francesco Castiello (13 October 1942 – 31 December 2024) was an Italian politician. He was a senator from 2018 until his death. Castiello died on 31 December 2024, at the age of 82.
