= Etelwardo Sigismondi =

Italian politician (born 1974)

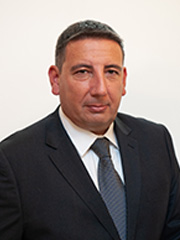
- Sigismondi in 2022

Member of the Senate
- Incumbent
- Assumed office 13 October 2022
- Constituency: Abruzzo – 01

Personal details
- Born: 29 September 1974 (age 51)
- Party: Brothers of Italy (since 2012)

Etelwardo Sigismondi (born 29 September 1974) is an Italian politician serving as a member of the Senate since 2022. He was a municipal councillor of Vasto from 2001 to 2006 and from 2008 to 2016.
