= Dario Damiani =

Italian politician (born 1974)

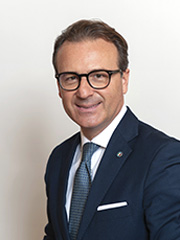
- Damiani in 2022

Member of the Senate
- Incumbent
- Assumed office 23 March 2018
- Constituency: Apulia – P01 (2018–2022); Apulia – P01 (2022–present)

Personal details
- Born: 21 June 1974 (age 51)
- Party: Forza Italia (since 2013)

Dario Damiani (born 21 June 1974) is an Italian politician serving as a member of the Senate since 2018. From 2006 to 2018, he was a municipal councillor of Barletta.
