= Marco Lisei =

Italian politician (born 1977)

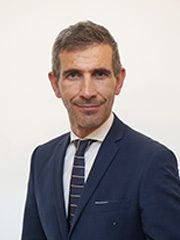
- Lisei in 2022

Member of the Senate
- Incumbent
- Assumed office 13 October 2022
- Constituency: Emilia-Romagna

Personal details
- Born: 15 March 1977 (age 49)
- Party: Brothers of Italy

Marco Lisei (born 15 March 1977) is an Italian politician serving as a member of the Senate since 2022. From 2020 to 2022, he was a member of the Legislative Assembly of Emilia-Romagna.
