= Legislature XVII of Italy =

17th legislature of the Italian Republic (2013–2018)

Legislature XVII of Italy XVII legislatura della Repubblica Italiana
- 17th legislature

Type
- Type: bicameral
- Houses: Chamber of Deputies; Senate of the Republic

History
- Founded: 15 March 2013
- Disbanded: 22 March 2018 (5 years, 7 days)
- Preceded by: XVI Legislature
- Succeeded by: XVIII Legislature

Leadership
- President of the Senate: Pietro Grasso, PD since 16 March 2013
- President of the Chamber of Deputies: Laura Boldrini, SEL since 16 March 2013

Structure
- Seats: C: 630; S: 321 (315 + 6)
- Chamber of Deputies political groups: PD (282); M5S (88); FI–PdL (56); Art.1 – MDP – LeU (42); AP–CpE–NCD–NcI (23); LN – NcS (22); SI–SEL–Pos–LeU (17); NcI–SC–MAIE (15); FdI–AN (12); Mixed (61)
- Senate political groups: PD (97); FI–PdL (44); M5S (35); AP–CpE–NCD (24); Aut–PSI–MAIE (18); Art.1–MDP–LeU (16); GAL–UDC (14); ALA–PRI (13); LN (11); NcI (11); FdL (IdeA–PLI) (7); Mixed (27)

Elections
- Chamber of Deputies voting system: Porcellum
- Senate voting system: Porcellum
- Last general election: 24–25 February 2013

Meeting place
- Palazzo Montecitorio, Rome (C)
- Palazzo Madama, Rome (S)

Website
- www.camera.it/leg17/1 www.senato.it/Leg17/home

Constitution
- Constitution of Italy

The Legislature XVII of Italy (Italian: XVII Legislatura della Repubblica Italiana) started on 15 March 2013 and ended on 22 March 2018. Its composition was the one resulting from the general election of 24–25 February 2013, called after the dissolution of the houses of Parliament announced by President Giorgio Napolitano on 22 December 2012.

The Parliament was dismissed after its term was completed, when President Sergio Mattarella dissolved the houses on 28 December 2017.

At the time of its foundation, this legislature had the lowest average age (48 years) and highest percentage of female MPs (31%) in Italian history.

== Government ==
| Prime Minister | Party | Term of office | | Government | Composition |
| Prime Minister | Party | Took office | Left office | Government | Composition |
|---|---|---|---|---|---|
| Enrico Letta (b. 1966) | Democratic Party | 28 April 2013 | 22 February 2014 | Letta | PD • PdL • SC • UDC • RI (Grand coalition) |
| Matteo Renzi (b. 1975) | Democratic Party | 22 February 2014 | 12 December 2016 | Renzi | PD • NCD • SC • UDC |
| Paolo Gentiloni (b. 1954) | Democratic Party | 12 December 2016 | 1 June 2018 | Gentiloni | PD • AP • CpE |

== Composition ==
=== Chamber of Deputies ===
The number of elected deputies is 630.

- President: Laura Boldrini (SEL until 2 March 2017, afterwards Mixed), elected on 16 March 2013
- Vice Presidents: Marina Sereni (PD), Roberto Giachetti (PD), Luigi Di Maio (M5S), Simone Baldelli (FI–PdL)

Parliamentary groups in the Chamber of Deputies
| Initial composition | | Final composition | | |
| Parliamentary group | Seats | Parliamentary group | Seats | Change |
| Democratic Party | 293 | Democratic Party | 282 | ▼11 |
| Five Star Movement | 109 | Five Star Movement | 88 | ▼21 |
| The People of Freedom – Berlusconi for President | 97 | Forza Italia – The People of Freedom – Berlusconi for President | 56 | ▼41 |
| Civics and Innovators | 47 | | | ▼47 |
| Italian Left – Left Ecology Freedom | 37 | Italian Left – Left Ecology Freedom – Possible – Free and Equal | 17 | ▼20 |
| Northern League and Autonomies | 20 | Northern League and Autonomies – League of Peoples – Us with Salvini | 22 | ▲2 |
| Brothers of Italy | 9 | Brothers of Italy – National Alliance | 12 | ▲3 |
| | | Article 1 – Democratic and Progressive Movement – Free and Equal | 42 | ▲42 |
| | | Popular Alternative – Centrists for Europe – NCD – Us with Italy | 23 | ▲23 |
| | | Us with Italy – Civic Choice for Italy – MAIE | 15 | ▲15 |
| | | Solidary Democracy – Democratic Centre | 12 | ▲12 |
| Mixed | 14 | Mixed | 61 | ▲47 |
| Linguistic Minorities | 5 | Linguistic Minorities | 6 | ▲1 |
| MAIE–Associative Movement Italians Abroad | 3 | | | ▼3 |
| Democratic Centre | 5 | | | ▼5 |
| | | Civics and Innovators – Energies for Italy | 14 | ▲14 |
| | | Direction Italy | 10 | ▲10 |
| | | UDC – IDEA | 6 | ▲6 |
| | | Free Alternative – All Together for Italy | 5 | ▲5 |
| | | Italian Socialist Party (PSI) – Liberals for Italy (PLI) – Independents | 3 | ▲3 |
| Non inscrits | 1 | Non inscrits | 17 | ▲16 |
| Total seats | 630 | Total seats | 630 | Steady |

=== Senate ===
The number of elected senators was 315. At the start of this legislature there were four life senators (Giulio Andreotti, Carlo Azeglio Ciampi, Emilio Colombo and Mario Monti), making the total number of senators equal to 319. At the end of the legislature, after the nomination of six new life senators (Claudio Abbado, Elena Cattaneo, Renzo Piano, Carlo Rubbia, Liliana Segre and Giorgio Napolitano as former living President of the Republic), and the deaths of Andreotti, Colombo, Abbado and Ciampi, the total number of senators became 321.

- President: Pietro Grasso (PD until 16 October 2017, afterwards Mixed), elected on 16 March 2013
- Vice Presidents: Valeria Fedeli (PD) (until 11 December 2016), Linda Lanzillotta (PD), Roberto Calderoli (Mixed–LN), Maurizio Gasparri (FI–PdL), Rosa Maria Di Giorgi (PD) (elected on 22 February 2017)

Parliamentary groups in the Senate of the Republic
| Initial composition | | Final composition | | |
| Parliamentary group | Seats | Parliamentary group | Seats | Change |
| Democratic Party | 106 | Democratic Party | 97 | ▼9 |
| The People of Freedom | 92 | Forza Italia – The People of Freedom | 44 | ▼48 |
| Five Star Movement | 53 | Five Star Movement | 35 | ▼18 |
| Civic Choice for Italy | 21 | | | ▼21 |
| Northern League and Autonomies | 17 | Northern League and Autonomies | 11 | ▼6 |
| For the Autonomies (SVP–UV–PATT–UPT) – PSI | 10 | For the Autonomies (SVP–UV–PATT–UPT) – PSI – MAIE | 18 | ▲8 |
| | | Popular Alternative – Centrists for Europe – NCD | 24 | ▲24 |
| | | Article 1 – Democratic and Progressive Movement – Free and Equal | 16 | ▲16 |
| | | Great Autonomies and Freedom – Union of Christian and Centre Democrats | 14 | ▲14 |
| | | ALA (Liberal Popular Alliance) – PRI (Italian Republican Party) | 13 | ▲13 |
| | | Us with Italy | 11 | ▲11 |
| | | Federation of Freedom (IdeA–People and Freedom – PLI) | 10 | ▲10 |
| Mixed | 20 | Mixed | 27 | ▲7 |
| | | Italian Left – Left Ecology Freedom – Free and Equal | 7 | ▲7 |
| | | Italy of Values | 2 | ▲2 |
| | | Together for Italy | 2 | ▲2 |
| | | X Movement | 1 | ▲1 |
| | | Movimento La Puglia in Più | 1 | ▲1 |
| | | Brothers of Italy – National Alliance | 1 | ▲1 |
| | | League for Salvini Premier | 1 | ▲1 |
| | | Civic Liguria | 1 | ▲1 |
| | | Progressive Field – Sardinia | 1 | ▲1 |
| Non inscrits | 20 | Non inscrits | 10 | ▼10 |
| | | Non-inscrit Life Senators | 1 | ▲1 |
| Total seats | 319 | Total seats | 321 | ▲2 |

==== Senators for Life ====
| Senator | Motivation | Appointed by | From | Till |
|---|---|---|---|---|
| Giulio Andreotti | Merits in the social field | President Francesco Cossiga | Previous legislature | 6 May 2013 (deceased) |
| Emilio Colombo | Merits in the social field | President Carlo Azeglio Ciampi | Previous legislature | 24 June 2013 (deceased) |
| Carlo Azeglio Ciampi | Former president of Italy | ex officio | Previous legislature | 16 September 2016 (deceased) |
| Mario Monti | Merits in the social field | President Giorgio Napolitano | Previous legislature | Next legislature |
| Claudio Abbado | Merits in the artistic field | President Giorgio Napolitano | 30 August 2013 | 20 January 2014 (deceased) |
| Elena Cattaneo | Merits in the social and scientific field | President Giorgio Napolitano | 30 August 2013 | Next legislature |
| Renzo Piano | Merits in the artistic field | President Giorgio Napolitano | 30 August 2013 | Next legislature |
| Carlo Rubbia | Merits in the social and scientific field | President Giorgio Napolitano | 30 August 2013 | Next legislature |
| Giorgio Napolitano | Former president of Italy | ex officio | 14 January 2015 | Next legislature |
| Liliana Segre | Merits in the social field | President Sergio Mattarella | 19 January 2018 | Next legislature |
