= Popular Alternative =

Popular Alternative Alternativa Popolare
- President: Paolo Alli
- Founder: Angelino Alfano
- Founded: 18 March 2017
- Preceded by: New Centre-Right
- Headquarters: Via Arcione 71, Rome
- Ideology: Conservatism; Christian democracy
- Political position: Centre to centre-right
- European affiliation: European People's Party
- Chamber of Deputies: 0 / 400
- Senate: 0 / 205
- European Parliament: 0 / 76
- Regional Councils: 0 / 896

Website
- alternativapopolare.it

Popular Alternative (Italian: Alternativa Popolare, AP) is a Christian-democratic political party in Italy that was founded on 18 March 2017 after the dissolution of New Centre-Right (NCD), one of the two parties that emerged at the break-up of The People of Freedom (PdL, the main Italian centre-right party from 2008 to 2013). "Popular" is a reference to popolarismo, the Italian variety of Christian democracy. The party has been a member of the European People's Party (EPP) since its foundation, having inherited the membership of the NCD.

The party's founder was Angelino Alfano, a former protége of Silvio Berlusconi and secretary of PdL (2011–2013) who has served as Minister of Justice (Berlusconi IV Cabinet, 2008–2011), Interior (Letta and Renzi Cabinets, 2013–2016) and Foreign Affairs (Gentiloni Cabinet, 2016–2018). In December 2017 Alfano announced that he would not stand in the 2018 general election and the party suffered the split of a large centre-right faction, whose members wanted to re-align with the centre-right coalition. The rump of the party continued its alliance with the Democratic Party, by formally entering the centre-left coalition, and, with Alfano's backing, Beatrice Lorenzin, Minister of Health since 2013, became AP's de facto leader until she left to join the Democratic Party in 2019.

The party has been led by Stefano Bandecchi from 2022 to January 2026, who approached more populist tendencies, but has failed to gain any national or regional representation, though the party is still active at the local levels.

== History ==
=== Origins and background ===
In November 2013 The People of Freedom (PdL), the centre-right party led by Silvio Berlusconi, was transformed back into Forza Italia (FI). A group of dissidents, led by Angelino Alfano, opposed the move and launched the New Centre-Right (NCD). Up to then, Alfano had been national secretary of the PdL and Berlusconi's protégé. Since its foundation, the NCD was part of the Italian governments successively led by Enrico Letta, Matteo Renzi and Paolo Gentiloni, all three members of the Democratic Party (PD), and Alfano served as Minister of the Interior and Foreign Affairs.

=== Foundation and early splits ===
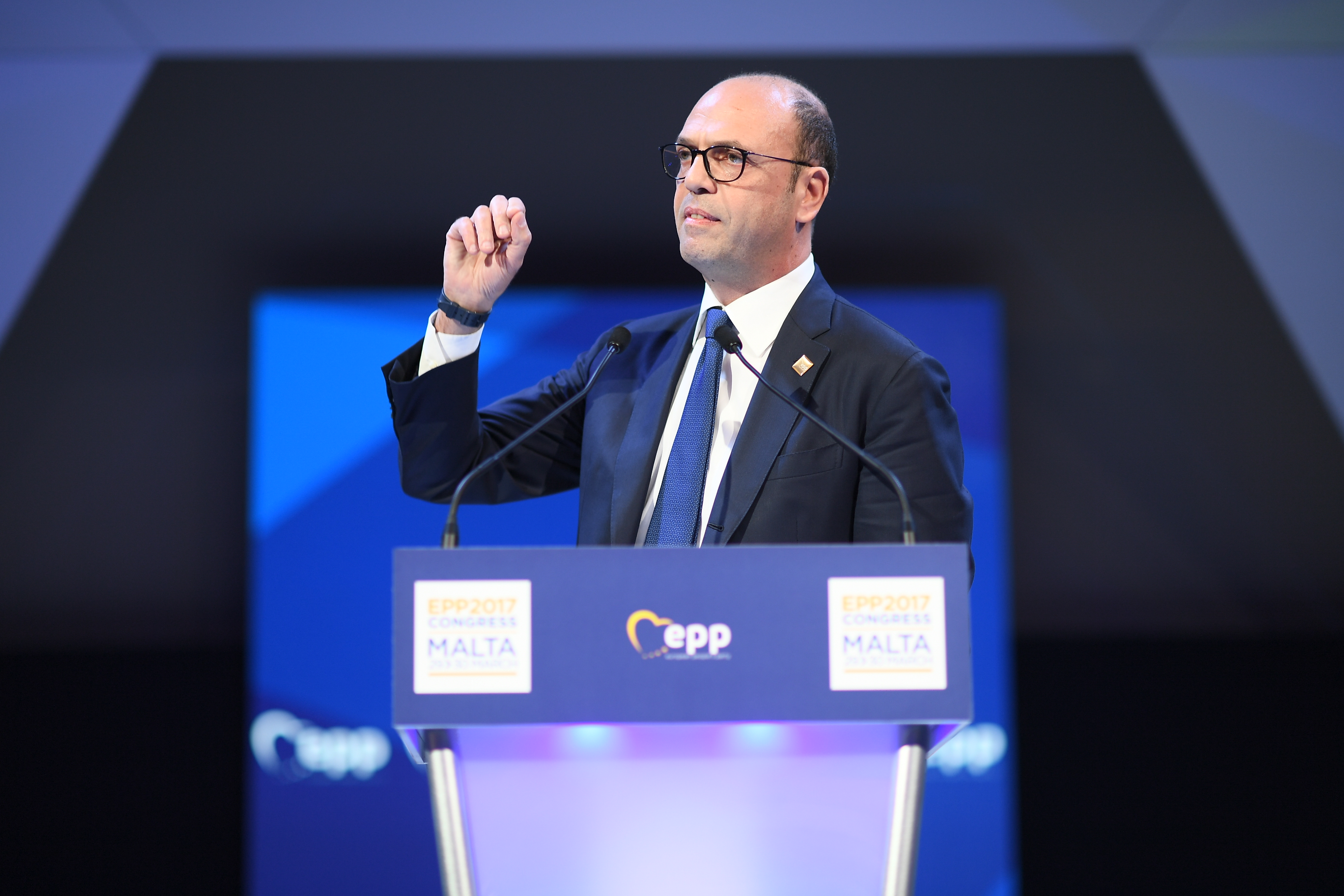
Angelino Alfano speaks at the 2017 EPP summit

On 18 March 2017 the NCD was dissolved into Popular Alternative (AP). Alfano's aim was to build a centre-right alliance with FI, while being at odds with Lega Nord (LN) and the Brothers of Italy (FdI), deemed "populist". Alfano also proposed a primary election to select the centre-right candidate for Prime Minister.

Virtually all NCD's leading members (including Maurizio Lupi, Roberto Formigoni, Beatrice Lorenzin, Fabrizio Cicchitto, Antonio Gentile, Gabriele Albertini, Laura Bianconi, Giovanni La Via and Francesco Colucci) followed Alfano in the new party, while Maurizio Sacconi joined Stefano Parisi's Energies for Italy (EpI).

Since its foundation AP was abandoned by five deputies (four re-joining FI, one joining the PD) and four senators (one joining FI, another the FdI and two the Federation of Freedom, FdL), while two deputies switched from the Liberal Popular Alliance (ALA). One of the deputies who left the party was Enrico Costa, who also resigned as minister of Regional Affairs from Paolo Gentiloni's government and aimed at forming a "liberal centre" with FI.

=== Road to the 2018 general election ===
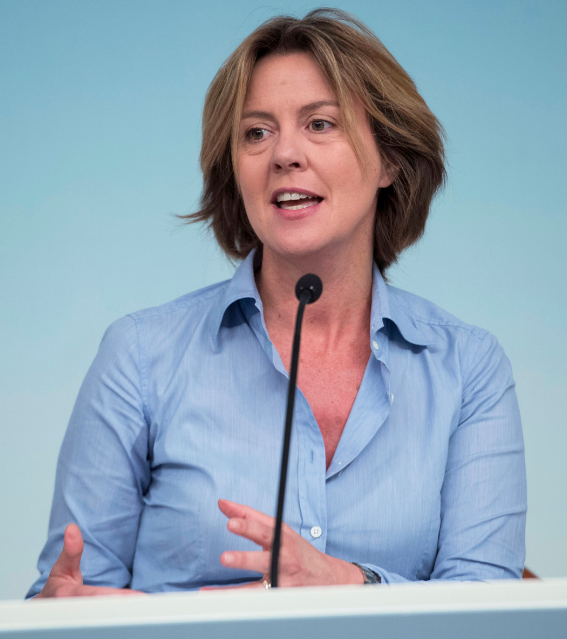
Beatrice Lorenzin in 2017

In the run-up of the 2018 general election AP, which was soundly defeated in the 2017 Sicilian regional election, was divided in three camps: those who wanted an alliance with the PD (Lorenzin and Cicchitto), those who proposed to run as a stand-alone list (Lupi) and those who were keen on returning with the centre-right coalition (Formigoni). The decision by the party's national board was postponed several times. In the meantime, Alfano announced that he would not stand in the election.

On 12 December 2017 AP's national board approved a consent settlement, under which the two parliamentary groups would continue to be active in order to prepare the electoral participation of the two main factions: the one led by Lorenzin and Cicchitto (backed by Alfano) with the centre-left (under the "Popular Alternative" name), the one led by Lupi and Formigoni with the centre-right (reviving the "New Centre-Right" banner). A few days later Gentile replaced Lupi as coordinator.

On 19 December the group around Lupi and the former AP members close to Costa formed Us with Italy (NcI), a pro-Berlusconi centrist electoral list within the centre-right coalition, along with Direction Italy (DI), Civic Choice (SC), Act! (F!), Cantiere Popolare (CP) and the Movement for the Autonomies (MpA). The list was later enlarged to the Union of the Centre (UdC) and Identity and Action (IdeA), with the goal of overcoming the 3% threshold under a new electoral law.

On 29 December AP formed the Popular Civic List (CP), a centrist electoral list within the centre-left coalition, along with Italy of Values (IdV), the Centrists for Europe (CpE), Solidary Democracy (DemoS), the Union for Trentino (UpT), Italy Is Popular (IP) and minor parties/groups, and Lorenzin was chosen as leader. Contextually, Gentile stepped down from coordinator and announced his return to FI, while continuing to serve as undersecretary in Gentiloni's government.

=== 2018 general election and decline ===
CP obtained a mere 0.5%, but the rump of AP, led by Lorenzin, had two elects to the Chamber from single-seat constituencies: Lorenzin herself and Gabriele Toccafondi. NcI scored a little better with 1.3% of the vote and a handful of former AP members, notably including Lupi, were elected in single-seat constituencies. In September 2018 Alfano stepped down from AP presidency and was replaced by Paolo Alli.

In the run-up to the 2019 European Parliament election the party formed a joint list with The People of the Family, a social-conservative party. However, the party was deeply fractured, as Lorenzin seemed to be supportive of the PD, while former spokesperson Valentina Castaldini stood as candidate for FI.

In September 2019 Lorenzin joined the PD, while Toccafondi was a founding member of Renzi's Italia Viva party, thus leaving the party with no representatives in Parliament.

=== Bandecchi's leadership ===
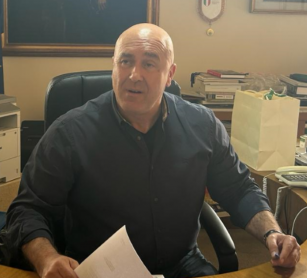
Stefano Bandecchi

In June 2022 entrepreneur Stefano Bandecchi was appointed coordinator of the party, a position previously held by Lorenzin. In the 2023 Italian local elections Bandecchi was elected mayor of Terni, by beating the FdI candidate in all centre-right run-off. In the following years, Bandecchi became well-known, due to his controversial and populist statements.

In the 2024 European Parliament election, the party ran its own list and was allowed by the Supreme Court of Cassation to do so without collecting any signature since it is affiliated with the European People's Party. However, the list only received 0.4% of the vote and thus failed to reach the 4% threshold. In the Livorno municipal elections held that same month, AP chose to support the mayoral candidacy of Costanza Vaccaro, an opposition city councilor who had left the League: she won the seat in the minority with Bandecchi's list, which however received only 2.5%.

In July 2024 Bandecchi announced his candidacy for president in the Umbrian regional election the following fall. However, in September, he declared that anagreement had been reached for the party to join the centre-right coalition. Consequently, he withdrew his candidacy, supporting the incumbent Donatella Tesei. In the Ligurian regional election in October, AP presented its own list supporting Marco Bucci, obtaining 0.3%. Bandecchi ran as the first candidate and received just over 200 votes in three provinces. In Emilia-Romagna, he supported Elena Ugolini without running, while in Umbria, Tesei was defeated and the AP list garnered 2.2% (in Terni 12%), without electing any councilors.

In January 2025 Bandecchi announced the withdrawal of AP from the centre-right coalition.

In the 2025 Campania regional election Bandecchi was a candidate for president and his list, named "Bandecchi Dimension", received 0.4% of the vote.

In January 2026 Alli and Bandecchi announced the separation of political paths between AP and the new political outfit Bandecchi Dimension: AP would continue along the tradition of Christian democracy, maintaining its membership in the EPP, while Dimensione Bandecchi would develop its own political action.

In the 2026 local elections Bandecchi's list presented its own candidate for mayor in Salerno, who obtained 2.3% of the vote, while in Reggio Calabria AP ran in support of the centre-right coalition's candidate for mayor, Francesco Cannizzaro, who was elected: in the occasion, AP's list obtained 4.8% of the vote, managing to elect one city councilor and obtaing one municipal minister in Cannizzaro's city government.

== Ideology and factions ==
The party's ideology is that of the NCD, as the former is the perfect continuation of the latter. Despite being home to some social democrats (Reformism and Freedom, We Reformers), the party was mainly a Christian-democratic party with a social-conservative streak. According to Corriere della Sera, differently from FI, NCD's stances on the "so-called ethical issues" (abortion, LGBT rights, etc.) were "closer to those of the European traditionalist right" and "thus not very compatible with those of the EPP's parties in big countries such as (Germany)". However, the party voted in favor of civil unions, whereas most FI members voted against it. The NCD was also criticised by some Catholic associations for not opposing enough the teaching of gender studies in schools. In addition, the NCD, as part of centre-left governments, proved more progressive than FI on the management of illegal immigration, which was negatively evaluated by Berlusconi's party. Precisely for these and other reasons, several NCD politicians left the party to either form Identity and Action (IdeA) led by Gaetano Quagliariello or re-joined FI (e.g. Nunzia De Girolamo, Renato Schifani and Massimiliano Salini), in both cases re-aligning with the FI-led centre-right coalition. Some of the formerly NCD-affiliated factions or think tanks are now affiliated to AP:

- Network Italy (Rete Italia) – ideology: Christian democracy; leader: Roberto Formigoni;
- Christian Populars (Cristiano Popolari) – ideology: Christian democracy; leader: Mario Baccini;
- Christian Reformists (Cristiano Riformisti) – ideology: Christian democracy; leader: Antonio Mazzocchi;
- Reformism and Freedom (Riformismo e Libertà) – ideology: Social democracy; leader: Fabrizio Cicchitto;
- We Reformers (Noi Riformatori) – ideology: Social democracy; leader: Francesco Colucci.

== Election results ==
=== Italian Parliament ===
Election	Leader	Chamber of Deputies					Senate of the Republic				
Election	Leader	Votes	%	Seats	+/–	Position	Votes	%	Seats	+/–	Position
2018	Beatrice Lorenzin	Into CP		2 / 630	New	13th	Into CP		0 / 315	New	13th

=== European Parliament ===
Election	Leader	Votes	%	Seats	+/–	EP Group
2019 (Note: Run in a joint list with The People of the Family.)	Paolo Alli	114,531 (12th)	0.43	0 / 76	New	–
2024	Stefano Bandecchi	91,288 (12th)	0.39	0 / 76	0	–

=== Regional Councils ===
Region	Election year	Votes	%	Seats	+/−
Aosta Valley	2018	—N/a	—N/a	0 / 35	–
Piedmont	2014	49,059 (7th) (Note: In a joint list with Union of the Centre.)	3.5	0 / 50	–
Lombardy	2018	20,668 (14th) (Note: Into Popular Civic List.)	0.4	0 / 80	–
South Tyrol	2018	—N/a	—N/a	0 / 35	–
Trentino	2018	—N/a	—N/a	0 / 35	–
Veneto	2015	37,937 (10th)	2.0	1 / 51	▲1
Friuli-Venezia Giulia	2018	—N/a	—N/a	0 / 49	–
Emilia-Romagna	2014	31,635 (7th)	2.6	0 / 50	–
Liguria	2024	1,929 (15th)	0.34	0 / 31	–
Tuscany	2015	15,837 (8th)	1.2	0 / 41	–
Marche	2015	21,049 (7th)	4.0	1 / 31	▲1
Umbria	2015	9,285 (9th)	2.6	0 / 20	–
Lazio	2018	6,073 (16th)	0.2	0 / 50	–
Abruzzo	2019	—N/a	—N/a	0 / 31	–
Molise	2018	—N/a	—N/a	0 / 21	–
Campania	2015	133,753 (5th)	5.9	1 / 51	▲1
Apulia	2015	101,817 (7th)	6.4	3 / 51	▲3
Basilicata	2019	—N/a	—N/a	0 / 21	–
Calabria	2014	47,574 (6th)	6.1	3 / 30	▲3
Sardinia	2019	—N/a	—N/a	0 / 60	–
Sicily	2017	80,366 (10th)	4.2	0 / 70	–

== Symbols ==
2017–2024

2024–present

== Leadership ==
- President: Angelino Alfano (2017–2018), Paolo Alli (2018–present)
  - Coordinator: Maurizio Lupi (2017), Antonio Gentile (2017), Beatrice Lorenzin (2018–2019), Stefano Bandecchi (2022–2026)
  - Overseas Coordinators: Massimo Romagnoli (2024-Present), Francesco Caracuta (2026-Present)
  - Spokesperson: Valentina Castaldini (2017–2019), Davide Tedesco (2024–present)
- Party Leader in the Chamber of Deputies: Maurizio Lupi (2017–2018), Beatrice Lorenzin (2018–2019), Gianluca Rospi (2020–2021), Giorgio Silli (2021)
- Party Leader in the Senate: Laura Bianconi (2017–2018), Tiziana Drago (2020–2021)
- Party Leader in the European Parliament: Giovanni La Via (2017–2018)
