= Identity and Action =

Italian political party

Identity and Action Identità e Azione
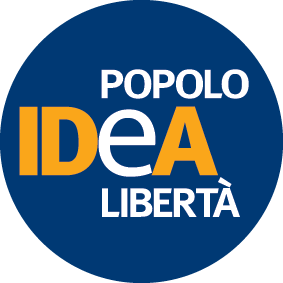
- President: Gaetano Quagliariello
- Founded: 25 November 2015
- Dissolved: 12 July 2023
- Split from: New Centre-Right
- Succeeded by: Us Moderates
- Headquarters: Piazza Madama 9, Rome
- Newspaper: l'Occidentale (online)
- Think tank: Magna Carta Foundation
- Membership (2017): 2,000+
- Ideology: Liberal conservatism Christian democracy
- Political position: Centre-right
- National affiliation: Italy in the Centre (2022–2023); Coraggio Italia (2021–2022)
- European affiliation: European Christian Political Party
- Colours: Blue Orange

Website
- www.movimentoidea.it

Identity and Action (Italian: Identità e Azione, IDeA) was a conservative political party in Italy, whose membership stretches from Christian democracy to liberal conservatism.

The party's leader was Gaetano Quagliariello, a former minister for Institutional Reforms.

== History ==
The party, whose complete name is Identity and Action – People and Freedom (Identità e Azione – Popolo e Libertà), was formed on 25 November 2015 by a group of splinters from the New Centre-Right (NCD), a centre-right party which was then part of government led by Matteo Renzi, leader of the centre-left Democratic Party (PD). Two deputies (Vincenzo Piso and Eugenia Roccella) and four senators (Andrea Augello, Luigi Compagna, Carlo Giovanardi and Gaetano Quagliariello) left the NCD because they no longer supported its alliance with the PD. They were joined by two deputies, Guglielmo Vaccaro (ex-PD, later Unique Italy–IU) and Renata Bueno (South American Union Italian Emigrants–USEI), and several regional politicians, including Davide Bellomo (independent, Apulia), Stefano Casali (Tosi List for Veneto, Veneto), Giovanni Chiodi (independent, former President of Abruzzo) and Vittoriano Solazzi (Marche 2020, Marche).

Since its foundation, IdeA aimed at being part of the larger centre-right coalition. The party established a particularly close relationship with Unique Italy (IU), of which Quagliariello became speaker in the Senate. In the meantime, the four deputies of IdeA, along with Aniello Formisano of Italy of Values (IdV, a party which had long been part of centre-left coalitions), formed a sub-group, named after the USEI (and, later, "USEI–IdeA"), within the Mixed Group of the Chamber, while the party's four senators joined the heterogeneous Great Autonomies and Freedom (GAL) group.

In May 2017 the party changed its allegiance both in the Chamber, where it formed a sub-group with the Union of the Centre (UdC) within the Mixed Group, and the Senate, where it left the GAL group and launched the alternative Federation of Freedom (FdL) group along with the Italian Liberal Party (PLI) and others, under Quagliariello's leadership.

In December 2017 IdeA was supposed to be a founding member of Us with Italy (NcI), a pro-Silvio Berlusconi centrist electoral list within the centre-right coalition for the 2018 general election, but finally stood out. NcI was launched by splinters from Popular Alternative (AP – two groups, a Christian-democratic one led by Maurizio Lupi and a liberal one led by Enrico Costa), Direction Italy (DC), Civic Choice (SC), Act! (F!), Cantiere Popolare (CP) and the Movement for the Autonomies (MpA). However, in early January 2018, after that NcI had been joined also by the UdC, IdeA joined too, with the goal of reaching 3%, required to win seats from proportional lists under a new electoral law.

In the election the NcI obtained a mere 1.3% of the vote and only Quagliariello was re-elected for IdeA. Soon after the election, the party quit NcI and, along with the UdC, formed a pact with FI and joined its parliamentary group.

In the 2019 Basilicata regional election the party obtained 4.2% of the vote.

On 26 May 2021, IDeA joined forces with Cambiamo! and a number of independents – mostly former members of Forza Italia members, in the formation of the Coraggio Italia movement, led by the mayor of Venice, Luigi Brugnaro, of which Quagliariello became vice-president on 14 July of that year.

On 26 March 2022, Gaetano Quagliariello and Giovanni Toti launched the new party Italy in the Centre at a convention held at the Genoa Aquarium, with the senator becoming its national coordinator. At the same time, Toti and Quagliariello stepped down from their roles within Coraggio Italia, announcing a federation between the two parties, which would continue to share parliamentary groups. On 23 June, the dissolution of the Coraggio Italia parliamentary group marked the definitive split between Brugnaro’s party and Italia al Centro.

For the 2022 snap general election, the new party is fielding Us Moderates, a joint list alongside Us with Italy, Coraggio Italia and Union of the Centre within the centre-right coalition. In the single-member constituency system, Quagliariello endorsed the candidacy of Pino Bicchielli in Salerno. In the elections on 25 September, the Us Moderates list secured 0.91 per cent of the vote in the Chamber of Deputies (255,505 votes) and 0.89 per cent in the Senate (244,363 votes), thus failing to exceed the 3 per cent electoral threshold and to elect its own MPs in the multi-member constituencies; however, in the single-member constituencies, the list managed to secure the election of 9 parliamentarians (7 deputies and 2 senators), including Bicchielli himself in the Chamber of Deputies.

In May 2023, Italy in the Centre and Us with Italy began the process of transforming Us Moderates into a fully-fledged political party.

== Election results ==
=== Italian Parliament ===
Election	Leader	Chamber of Deputies				Senate of the Republic			
Election	Leader	Votes	%	Seats	Position	Votes	%	Seats	Position
2018	Gaetano Quagliariello	Into NcI–UDC		0 / 630	8th	Into NcI–UDC		1 / 315	8th
