= South American Union of Italian Emigrants =

South American Union of Italian Emigrants Unione Sudamericana Emigrati Italiani
- President: Eugenio Sangregorio
- Founded: 2006
- Headquarters: Buenos Aires, Argentina
- Ideology: Interests of Italians abroad Liberal conservatism
- Political position: Centre-right
- National affiliation: Centre-right coalition (since December 2019)
- Chamber of Deputies: 0 / 400
- Senate: 0 / 200

Website
- www.usei-it.org

The South American Union of Italian Emigrants (Italian: Unione Sudamericana Emigrati Italiani, USEI) is an Italian political party representing Italian minorities in South America, especially Argentina and Brazil.

Its leader is Eugenio Sangregorio, who was elected to the Chamber of Deputies in the 2018 general election.

== History ==
USEI was founded in 2006 by Eugenio Sangregorio, a Calabrian-born entrepreneur.

In the 2006 general election the party won 4.7% of the vote in the South American constituency of the Chamber of Deputies. USEI did not participate in the 2008 general election, but continued to be active and improve its network.

In the 2013 general election USEI won 13.3% of the vote in the South American constituency and elected Renata Bueno to the Chamber of Deputies. Bueno was the daughter of Rubens Bueno, a long-time member of the Brazilian Chamber of Deputies for the Brazilian Socialist Party. After the election, she formed a parliamentary alliance with the alternative Associative Movement Italians Abroad (MAIE) within the Mixed Group of the Chamber, that lasted for two and half years.

Despite the fact that USEI's and Sangregorio's political orientation was broadly centre-right, Bueno, due to her family's political upbringing, started to be supportive of the Democratic Party (PD), the country's main centre-left party, and, particularly, its leader Matteo Renzi, who served as Prime Minister from February 2014 to December 2016.

In November 2015, Bueno joined forces with Identity and Action (IdeA), a centre-right party opposed to Renzi. Subsequently, she formed a sub-group, named after the USEI (and, later, "USEI–IdeA"), within the Mixed Group of the Chamber, along with Aniello Formisano of Italy of Values (IdV), a party traditionally affiliated to the centre-left, and Guglielmo Vaccaro of Unique Italy (IU). Right after its formation, the sub-group was joined also by the other two IdeA deputies, Eugenia Roccella and Vincenzo Piso. The USEI–IdeA sub-group was dissolved in May 2017. After that, Bueno was affiliated with Civics and Innovators (CI) and Direction Italy (DI). Sangregorio, who had opposed the constitutional reform proposed by Renzi with the 2016 constitutional referendum (Renzi lost and resigned from Prime Minister), was not willing to field Bueno again as a USEI candidate.

In the 2018 general election the party won 18.7% of the vote in the South American constituency and Sangregorio was elected to the Chamber of Deputies, while Bueno led the Popular Civic List to 6.3% (compared to 0.5% in Italy) and was not elected. USEI ran also for the Senate, obtaining 20.4% and the election of Adriano Cario. In May 2018 Cario left the USEI and switched to MAIE.

On 18 December 2019, USEI formed with the centrist allies of Forza Italia (Alliance of the Centre and Us with Italy) and the centre-right Cambiamo! the new sub-group within the Mixed Group "Noi con l'Italia-USEI-Cambiamo!-Alleanza di Centro".

== Electoral results ==
=== Italian Parliament ===
Chamber of Deputies – Italians abroad
Election year	# of overall votes	% of overall vote	# of overall seats	# of seats for Italians abroad	±
2006	14,205	1.46	0 / 630	0 / 12	0
2013	44,024	4.5	1 / 630	1 / 12	▲1
2018	68,291	6.08	1 / 630	1 / 12	1
2022	73,389	6.76	0 / 400	0 / 8	▼1

Senate – Italians abroad
Election year	# of overall votes	% of overall vote	# of overall seats	# of seats for Italians abroad	±
2006	12,552	1.41	0 / 315	0 / 6	0
2013	38,223	4.3	0 / 315	0 / 6	0
2018	68,233	6.61	1 / 315	1 / 6	▲1
2022	55,523	5.09	0 / 200	0 / 4	▼1
