= Vincenzo Piso =

Italian politician

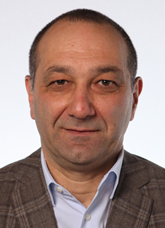
Vincenzo Piso, Italian politician

Vincenzo Piso (Rome, 29 June 1958) is an Italian politician.

== Biography ==
Engaged since his teenage years in politics, Vincenzo Piso was one of the protagonists of the Roman youth right in the 1970s.

He grew up in a political environment in the northern quadrant of the city and graduated from the Liceo Ginnasio "Orazio" high school.

In 1997 he was elected for the first time as a city councilor and was reelected in 2001 and 2006.

From 2002 to 2006 he held the position of President of the Roman Federation of Alleanza Nazionale and from 2006 to 2008 he served as Vice President of the Rome City Council.

In 2008 he was elected MP for PDL in the Lazio 1 constituency and is a member of the IX Transport, Posts and Telecommunications Commission.

From 2009 to 2013 he held the position of Regional Coordinator of the People of Freedom in Lazio.

He was elected deputy for the first time in the 2008 general elections in the Popolo della Libertà lists.

In the 2013 general elections he was reappointed deputy of the 17th legislature of the Italian Republic in the Lazio 2 constituency for the People of Freedom.

On 16 November 2013, with the suspension of the Popolo della Libertà's activities, he joined the Nuovo Centrodestra led by Angelino Alfano, of which he is a member of the executive council in the Chamber.

On 23 November 2015, after numerous criticisms from party chairman Angelino Alfano, he left the Nuovo Centrodestra, as well as the Area Popolare group in the Chamber of Deputies, then switched to the Mixed Group and became one of the founders of the Identity and Action Movement, led by Gaetano Quagliariello.

Then, on 1 December 2015, he joined the "USEI-IDEA" component of the Mixed Group.

He did not run for election in the 2018 general elections.

== Court proceedings ==
=== Laziogate ===
In 2005 as part of the Laziogate scandal, Piso was investigated for abusive access to a computer system, aiding and abetting and violation of the electoral law. In March 2007, Piso was remanded for trial.

On 5 May 2010 the Court of Rome sentenced him to eight months' imprisonment, despite the fact that prosecutors had asked for his acquittal. Piso appealed.

On 29 October 2012 the Rome Court of Appeal acquitted Piso because "the fact does not exist."

=== Mafia Capitale ===
As part of the "Mondo di mezzo" investigation into the so-called Mafia Capitale Piso was being investigated by the Rome Public Prosecutor's Office for illegal financing.

On 6 October 2016 prosecutors asked for the case to be dismissed. The Prosecutor's Office had previously decided to maintain the utmost confidentiality on the investigation, which was revealed to the press organs only after the filing request.

On 7 February 2017 prosecutors dismissed the case and acquitted Piso of the charges.
