= Alessandro Colucci =

Italian politician (born 1974)

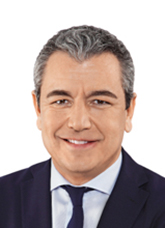
- Colucci in 2018

Member of the Chamber of Deputies
- Incumbent
- Assumed office 23 March 2018
- Constituency: Lombardy 3 – U04 (2018–2022); Apulia – U10 (2022–present)

Personal details
- Born: 20 May 1974 (age 52)
- Party: Us Moderates (since 2022)

Alessandro Colucci (born 20 May 1974) is an Italian politician serving as a member of the Chamber of Deputies since 2018. From 2005 to 2018, he was a member of the Regional Council of Lombardy.

== Biography ==
Born and living in Milan, he is the son of Francesco Colucci, who served as a member of parliament for nearly forty years representing the Italian Socialist Party, Forza Italia, and the People of Freedom Party, and who served several terms as a quaestor of the Chamber of Deputies (Italy).

From 2002 to 2007, he served as a council member on the Magenta, Lombardy (Milan) city council led by Luca Del Gobbo.

In the 2005 regional elections in Lombardy, he ran on the Forza Italia (1994) ticket in support of outgoing President Roberto Formigoni and was elected to the Lombardy Regional Council from the Milan constituency with 13,983 preferential votes. In the 2010 Lombardy regional elections, he was re-elected as a regional councilor on The People of Freedom (PdL) ticket in the same constituency with 16,407 votes, and was subsequently appointed councilor with responsibility for green spaces and landscape in the Lombardy Regional Government. He ran again in the 2013 regional elections, once more with the PdL, in support of the Northern League’s federal secretary Roberto Maroni (a member of Parliament and former minister on several occasions), and was elected for the third time to the Lombardy Regional Council for the province of Milan with 7,166 votes.

On March 18, 2017, the New Center-Right merged into Popular Alternative (AP), where he retained the role he had held in the NDC.

With the unanimous approval of the motion by the AP National Executive Committee—which formalizes the “consensual separation” of the party’s two wings—Maurizio Lupi, Roberto Formigoni, and Gabriele Albertini have followed suit in returning to the center-right coalition.

On December 19, 2017, together with breakaway members of Alternativa Popolare such as Lupi and Enrico Costa (politician), Raffaele Fitto’s Direction Italy, Saverio Romano’s Cantiere Popolare, Enrico Zanetti’s Scelta Civica, and Flavio Tosi’s Fare!, launched the “Noi con l’Italia” electoral list to serve as the so-called “fourth pillar” of the center-right coalition ahead of the upcoming general election on March 4.
