= Us with Italy =

Us with Italy Noi con l'Italia
- President: Maurizio Lupi
- Vice President: Giuseppe Galati; Chiara Fazio; Luigi Morgante
- Coordinator: Francesco Saverio Romano
- Founded: 19 December 2017
- Dissolved: 12 July 2023
- Split from: Popular Alternative
- Succeeded by: Us Moderates
- Headquarters: Corso Vittorio Emanuele II 18, Rome
- Ideology: Liberal conservatism Christian democracy
- Political position: Centre to centre-right
- National affiliation: Electoral list: Us Moderates (2022–2023); Coalition: Centre-right coalition
- Colours: Blue

Website
- www.noiconlitalia.it

Us with Italy (Italian: Noi con l'Italia, NcI) was a liberal conservative and Christian-democratic political party in Italy.

NcI started as a federation of minor centre-right parties and, as such, was part of the centre-right coalition in the 2018 general election. Along with Forza Italia, NcI represented the coalition's "centrist" wing and supported Silvio Berlusconi or another "centrist" candidate as Prime Minister. Originally, the federation's full name was Us with Italy – UDC for its alliance with the Union of the Centre.

NcI's early leaders were Raffaele Fitto (president, leader of Direction Italy), Francesco Saverio Romano (vice president, leader of Cantiere Popolare), Maurizio Lupi (coordinator, former leading member of Popular Alternative) and Enrico Costa (the main proponent). Both Fitto, who led his party into Brothers of Italy, and Costa have since left. It has become a full-fledged political party under the leadership of Lupi.

In July 2023, the party was officially disbanded, becoming a founding member of the newborn centrist party, Us Moderates.

== History ==
In the run-up of the 2018 general election there was a debate on the creation of a "fourth leg" of the centre-right coalition, whose three members were Forza Italia (FI), Lega Nord (LN) and the Brothers of Italy (FdI). The process started when Enrico Costa, a FI dissident who had been a minister in Paolo Gentiloni's centre-left government, resigned from his post and left his party, Popular Alternative (AP), to form a "liberal centre" in alliance with FI. Originally, the Federation of Freedom (FdL), a parliamentary group in the Senate launched by Identity and Action (IdeA), was seen as the embryo of the "fourth leg", but IdeA was not involved in the first steps, which involved other political actors.

On 19 December 2017, "Us with Italy" (NcI) was formed by seven groups: the faction of AP led by Maurizio Lupi, other former AP members close to Enrico Costa, Direction Italy (DI), Civic Choice (SC), Act! (Fare), Cantiere Popolare (CP) and the Movement for the Autonomies (MpA). On 29 December 2017 NcI signed a pact with the Union of the Centre (UdC), which led to the "Us with Italy – UDC" name. On 5 January 2018 it was the turn of IdeA, which was persuaded by the federative character of the list and the more distinctive Christian-democratic identity, both thanks to UdC's presence. On 11 January a new symbol of NcI, containing also UdC's crossed shield, was unveiled.

In the election, NcI obtained a mere 1.3% of the vote for the Chamber of Deputies and four deputies from single-seat constituencies: Costa, Lupi, Alessandro Colucci and Renzo Tondo. The first three were former members of AP, while the fourth was a member both of Responsible Autonomy (a regional liberal party active in Friuli-Venezia Giulia) and DI. The list was able to elect also four senators, three of the UdC and one of IdeA. Soon after the election, both the UdC and IdeA left the alliance to form a pact with FI.

In April 2018, Costa also left the NcI and re-joined FI. More importantly, in December 2018 Fitto led DI out of NcI, announcing its end (DI would join the right-wing FdI in 2019). However, NcI continued to exist as a sub-group within the Mixed Group of Chamber of Deputies. Moreover, in the 2019 European Parliament election it was part of FI's electoral slates.

In 2019, Lupi became NcI's new president and the outfit was structured as a full-fledged party, composed of three associate parties: Popular Liguria (LP), AR and CP. Progressively, other minor groups, notably including the South American Union of Italian Emigrants (USEI), the Alliance of the Centre (AdC), the Moderates in Revolution (MiR), the Schittulli Political Movement (MPS) and Renaissance were merged into NcI or became associate parties. After a brief alliance with Cambiamo!, since February 2021 the party's sub-group within the Mixed Group of the Chamber has been named "Us with Italy–USEI–Renaissance–AdC" and has featured five members: Lupi (a Christian democrat), Colucci (a social democrat) and Tondo (a liberal) of NcI, Eugenio Sangregorio of the USEI and Vittorio Sgarbi of Renaissance. NCI's Andrea Costa was appointed undersecretary of Health in Mario Draghi's government in 2021.

In the run-up of the 2022 general election, NCI first formed a joint list with Italy in the Centre (IaC), then it was a founding member of Us Moderates (NM), a broader joint list within the centre-right coalition, along with IaC, the UdC and Coraggio Italia (CI).

In May 2023, the party held its first congress. Lupi was re-elected president by defeating Andrea Galli, while Giuseppe Galati became vice president and Francesco Saverio Romano coordinator. During the congress, it was announced that Us Moderates would become a party.

== Ideology ==
The party has been described primarily as liberal conservative and Christian-democratic, but contains also and social-conservative and liberal factions.

== Composition ==
=== Founding members ===
Party	Main ideology	Leader/s
Direction Italy	Liberal conservatism	Raffaele Fitto
Civic Choice	Liberalism	Enrico Zanetti
Act!	Liberalism	Flavio Tosi
Cantiere Popolare	Christian democracy	Francesco Saverio Romano
Movement for the Autonomies	Regionalism	Giuseppe Maria Reina
Independents (former AP members)	Christian democracy	Maurizio Lupi
Independents (former AP members)	Liberalism	Enrico Costa

=== 2018 associate members ===
Party	Main ideology	Leader/s
Union of the Centre	Christian democracy	Lorenzo Cesa
Identity and Action	Christian democracy	Gaetano Quagliariello
New CDU – United Christian Democrats	Christian democracy	Mario Tassone
Union of Democrats for Europe	Christian democracy	Clemente Mastella

== Election results ==
=== Italian Parliament ===
Election	Leader	Chamber of Deputies					Senate of the Republic				
Election	Leader	Votes	%	Seats	+/–	Position	Votes	%	Seats	+/–	Position
2018	Raffaele Fitto	427,152	1.30	4 / 630	New	8th	361,402	1.20	4 / 315	New	8th
2022	Maurizio Lupi	Into NM		3 / 400	▼1	12th	Into NM		0 / 200	▼4	13th

=== European Parliament ===
Election	Leader	Votes	%	Seats	+/–	EP Group
2019	Maurizio Lupi	Into FI		0 / 76	New	–

=== Regional Councils ===
Region	Election year	Votes	%	Seats	+/–
Lombardia	2018	66,355 (10th)	1.3	1 / 80	▲1
Lazio	2018	41.234 (9th)	1.6	1 / 51	▲1
Abruzzo	2019	17,308 (9th) (Note: In a joint list with UDC, DC and IdeA.)	2.9	0 / 29	–
Molise	2018	5,204 (9th)	3.6	1 / 21	▲1

== Leadership ==
- President: Raffaele Fitto (2017–2018), Maurizio Lupi (2019–2023)
  - Vice President: Francesco Saverio Romano (2017–2023), Giuseppe Galati (2023), Chiara Fazio (2023), Luigi Morgante (2023)
- Coordinator: Maurizio Lupi (2017–2019), Renzo Tondo (2023), Francesco Saverio Romano (2023)
- Organisational Secretary: Alessandro Colucci (2021–2023)
