= Magna Carta Foundation =

Italian think tank

The Magna Carta Foundation (Fondazione Magna Carta, FMC) is an Italian think tank, which has been involved in politics, having been affiliated to Forza Italia (FI), The People of Freedom (PdL) and, subsequently, New Centre-Right (NCD). FMC's current president is Gaetano Quagliariello, a minister in Letta Cabinet.

The think tank aims at combining elements of liberalism with Catholic social teaching, supports the Judeo-Christian roots of Europe, and takes a strong pro-United States and pro-Israel stance in foreign policy, especially in relation to radical Islam and Islamic terrorism. For these reasons and due to the left-wing roots of many of its members, the group has been sometimes described as the neoconservative faction within FI and, later, the PdL. In fact, FMC has had close ties with American neocons and has agreed with them especially on issues of national security and just war theory.

The foundation's leading figure was long Marcello Pera, but later Quagliariello took over. Among MPs, other than Pera and Quagliariello, Fiamma Nirenstein, Eugenia Roccella, Luigi Compagna, Souad Sbai, Giuseppe Calderisi, Alfredo Mantovano, and Guido Possa have been, to different extents, close to FMC.

In November 2013 Quagliariello, Roccella and Compagna left the PdL and joined NCD.
