= Paolo Alli =

Italian politician (born 1950)

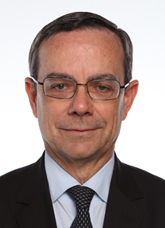

Member of the Chamber of Deputies
- In office 13 March 2013 – 22 March 2018
- Constituency: Lombardy 1

President of Popular Alternative
- Incumbent
- Assumed office 18 March 2017
- Preceded by: Position established

President of the NATO Parliamentary Assembly
- In office November 2016 – March 2018
- Preceded by: Michael R. Turner
- Succeeded by: Rasa Juknevičienė

Personal details
- Born: 6 July 1950 (age 76) Legnano, Lombardy, Italy
- Party: Popular Alternative (2017 to present)
- Other political affiliations: New Centre Right (2013-2017); The People of Freedom (2009-2013); Forza Italia (1994-2009); Christian Democracy (Until 1994)
- Education: Politecnico of Milano
- Profession: Politician, diplomat, engineer

Paolo Alli (born 6 July 1950) is an Italian politician and former president of the NATO Parliamentary Assembly after being appointed in November 2016. He left this role in March 2018.

Alli has been a member of the Italian Chamber of Deputies since March 2013 and currently sits on the Foreign Affairs Committee and the European Union Policies Committee and the Joint Committee on the Implementation of Fiscal Federalism. After leaving his position at NATO, Alli took a position as National President the centre-right Popular Alternative Party.

== Personal life ==
=== Early life ===
Alli was born in Legnano, Milan, on 6 July 1950. He graduated from the Politecnico of Milano in engineering and worked from 1979 to 1999 for several Italian engineering companies. He also worked on projects having to do with environmental engineering and structure where he represented companies in International conferences.

=== Early political activity ===
In 1993 Alli was elected to the Legnano Municipal Council, where he served as leader of the opposition until he was elected vice-mayor under the new centre-right coalition. In June 2000 he began working for the Lombardy Regional Government, where he served as general director of public services, director of external relations, international relations and communications, and head of the secretariat and policy of the president. Alli was appointed undersecretary to the Presidency of the Lombardy Region in May 2010.

=== Later political career ===
In March 2013 Alli was elected to the Italian Chamber of Deputies for Lombardy 1 under the New Centrodestra political group. He has also served on the Foreign Affairs Committee, European Commission's Policy Committee, and the Bicameral Commission for the Implementation of Federalism, in the position of chair.

=== NATO career ===
In November 2014 Ali was elected vice-president of the NATO Parliamentary Assembly. Then in Istanbul at the 62nd annual session he was elected to succeed United States Congressman Michael R. Turner as president of the Assembly. Ali left his executive position at NATO in 2018.

=== Personal activity ===
Alli is very dedicated to the musical and performing arts. In 1975 he founded the award-winning Jubilate Choir of Legnano where he still serves as director. He has also supported other music and art schools in the area.CHI SONO – Paolo Alli
