= Enrico Costa (politician) =

Italian politician and lawyer (born 1969)

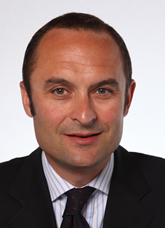

Minister of Regional Affairs and Autonomies
- In office 29 January 2016 – 19 July 2017
- Prime Minister: Matteo Renzi; Paolo Gentiloni
- Preceded by: Maria Carmela Lanzetta
- Succeeded by: Paolo Gentiloni (acting); Erika Stefani

Member of the Chamber of Deputies
- Incumbent
- Assumed office 27 April 2006

Personal details
- Born: 29 November 1969 (age 56) Cuneo, Italy
- Party: Forza Italia
- Other political affiliations: PLI (1990–1993); UdC (1993–1998); Forza Italia (1998–2009); PdL (2009–2013); NCD (2013–2017); AP (2017); NcI (2017–2018); Forza Italia (2018–2020); Action (2020–2024)
- Education: University of Turin
- Profession: Politician, lawyer

Enrico Costa (born 29 November 1969) is an Italian politician and lawyer who has been a member of the Chamber of Deputies since 2006. Between 2016 and 2017, he also served as Minister for Regional Affairs and Autonomies.

== Early life ==
Costa was born on 29 November 1969 in Cuneo, in the Italian region of Piedmont. His father, Raffaele Costa, was a politician who was Minister of Health in the first Amato government and the first Berlusconi government. He graduated in Law from the University of Turin.

== Career ==
Costa began his political career within the ranks of Italian Liberal Party (PLI) in 1990. From 1993 to 1998, he was a member of the Union of the Centre until he joined Forza Italia. In 2004, Costa was municipal councillor of Forza Italia in Isasca. On 16 May 2005, he was elected regional councillor of Piedmont. Elected deputy to the Chamber of Deputies in 2006 on the Forza Italia list in the Piedmont 2 constituency.

During his first term as deputy, Costa became a member of the Parliamentary Commission for the simplification of legislation. Re-elected in 2008 in the lists of The People of Freedom (PdL), he was chairman of the PDL in the Justice Commission in the Chamber and a member of the Committee for the Authorizations to proceed at Montecitorio and of the Constitutional Affairs Commission. In the Justice Commission, he was speaker for the Government of much discussed rules such as the Lodo Alfano, which blocked the judicial processes against the four highest offices of the State (later repealed by the Constitutional Court), and the legitimate impediment, which provided for the suspension judicial processes against the Prime Minister and the Ministers up to the maintenance of the elected office. A provincial coordinator of the PDL in Cuneo, he was appointed regional coordinator of the PDL in Piedmont in January 2013.

Re-elected deputy in February 2013 on the PDL list, Costa became vice president of the Council for the Authorizations to proceed of the Chamber and a member of the Justice Commission. On 18 November 2013, with the return of the PdL to the name of Forza Italia, he joined the New Centre-Right (NCD) led by Angelino Alfano, being elected group chairman in the Chamber of Deputies and Regional Coordinator of the party in Piedmont. On 28 February 2014, he became Deputy Minister of Justice in the Renzi government, thus leaving the position of group leader and being replaced by Nunzia De Girolamo.

In the 2014 Piedmontese regional election, Costa was a candidate for the presidency of the region for the NCD, getting 2.98% of the vote. On 28 January 2016, he became Minister for Regional Affairs and Autonomies, succeeding Maria Carmela Lanzetta (exactly one year after her resignation). In addition to the powers of his department, Prime Minister Matteo Renzi entrusted him with responsibilities in matters of family policies. He was reconfirmed as minister with the same powers, also in the executive headed by Paolo Gentiloni.

On 19 July 2017, Costa resigned from his post as minister in disagreement with some measures proposed by the Council of Ministers to which he was part. On the same day, he decided to leave Popular Alternative (AP) but Silvio Berlusconi locked the doors of Forza Italia to Costa and others, suggesting that they give life to a new centrist formation. On 19 December, he joined Us with Italy (NcI), the "fourth leg" of the centre-right coalition. Re-elected in 2018 as a deputy in the single-member district of Alba, Piedmont, obtaining 48.24% of the votes. On 19 April 2018, he left NcI and returned to Forza Italia. On 4 August 2020, he announced his move to Action, the liberal-reformist party founded and led by Carlo Calenda. In 2024, he left Action and returned to Forza Italia.
