= Great Autonomies and Freedom =

Italian political party

Great Autonomies and Freedom Grandi Autonomie e Libertà
- Chamber: Senate
- Foundation: 20 March 2013
- Dissolution: 23 March 2018
- Ideology: Regionalism; Christian democracy
- Political position: Centre-right (majority)

Great Autonomies and Freedom (Italian: Grandi Autonomie e Libertà, GAL) was a miscellaneous and highly heterogeneous, mainly centre-right, regionalist and Christian-democratic, parliamentary group active in the Italian Senate.

The group was formed in March 2013 by senators elected with The People of Freedom (PdL) and Lega Nord (LN) to counterbalance the For the Autonomies group, a centre-left outfit allied with the Democratic Party (PD). Only three senators were members of the group for five years: Mario Ferrara, Giovanni Mauro and Giulio Tremonti (the first two elected with the PdL in representation of Great South; the latter elected with the LN and member of the group since May 2013).

In the following years, the group changed its scope, as several of its members started to support the Renzi Cabinet, and, almost completely, its composition: the LN members returned to their home group, most PdL and, later, Forza Italia (FI) members switched to other parties and groups (in July 2015, in particular, five senators left to join a fully pro-Renzi group, the Liberal Popular Alliance, ALA), and senators of different ideological and electoral backgrounds joined, including, for some time, members of the Federation of the Greens and Italy of Values (IdV), both left-leaning.

In May 2017 the group was joined by seven senators of Direction Italy (DI) and left by five senators, including the four senators of Identity and Action (IdeA), who launched the alternative Federation of Freedom (FdL) group. In December the group was finally left by the seven DI senators, who were founding members of Us with Italy (NcI), and joined by four senators of the Union of the Centre (UdC). IdeA and the UdC were partners in the Chamber of Deputies.

As a result, after several changes in its composition (see below) and naming, as of December 2017 the group's full name was Great Autonomies and Freedom – Union of Christian and Centre Democrats. In its final composition, the group was overwhelmingly opposed to Gentiloni Cabinet.

== Composition ==
Party	Main ideology	MPs 2013	MPs 2018
Great South	Regionalism	3	2
The People of Freedom	Liberal conservatism	3	–
Lega Nord	Regionalism	2	–
Party of Sicilians	Regionalism	2	–
Union of the Centre	Christian democracy	–	4
Forza Italia	Liberal conservatism	–	1
Other parties, non-party independents		–	7
Total		10	14
