= Reformism and Freedom =

Italian think tank

Reformism and Freedom (Riformismo e Libertà, ReL) is a "reformist" and mainly social-democratic think tank in Italy. ReL, whose president is Fabrizio Cicchitto, has been associated with The People of Freedom (PdL), a political party, until 2013 and is now close to New Centre-Right (NCD).

ReL aims at strengthening the alliance between Catholics and secular forces, for which Forza Italia was born in 1994. It was launched in November 2009 by Chicchitto, a former member of the Italian Socialist Party, along with other former Socialists, including Francesco Forte (who serves as president of ReL's scientific committee), Ugo Finetti, Margherita Boniver, Giuliano Cazzola, Francesco Colucci (leader of We Reformers), Pier Luigi Borghini, Giancarlo Lehner, Sergio Pizzolante (active also in Young Italy), Chiara Moroni, Alfredo Pallone, Fiamma Nirenstein, Carlo Ripa di Meana. In order to fulfill its goal of uniting the different political traditions represented in the Italian centre-right, the think tank includes also some liberals, such as Luigi Compagna and Nicolò Zanon, some liberal Christian democrats, including Sandro Fontana and Gianstefano Frigerio, and some leading liberal-conservatives from National Alliance, such as Gennaro Malgieri and Paolo Armaroli.

In October 2012 Cicchitto launched the "For a Lib-Lab manifesto" initiative along with other like-minded members of the PdL, including Renato Brunetta (Free Foundation), Stefano Caldoro and Lucio Barani (New Italian Socialist Party), and Giuseppe Calderisi (a former leading member of Liberal Reformers).

In November 2013 Cicchitto, Pizzolante, Cazzola, Colucci, Pallone and other leading ReL members left the PdL to join NCD.
