= Maria Carmela Lanzetta =

Italian politician

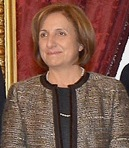

Minister of Regional Affairs and Autonomy
- In office 22 February 2014 – 30 January 2015
- Prime Minister: Matteo Renzi
- Preceded by: Graziano Delrio
- Succeeded by: Enrico Costa

Mayor of Monasterace
- In office 2006–2013
- Preceded by: Antonio Palmiro Spanò
- Succeeded by: Maria Luisa Tripoldi

Personal details
- Born: 1 March 1955 (age 71) Mammola
- Party: Italia Viva
- Education: University of Bologna

Maria Carmela Lanzetta (born 1 March 1955) is an Italian politician, who served as Minister of Regional Affairs and Autonomy from 22 February 2014 to 30 January 2015 as part of the Renzi Cabinet.

She was the mayor of Monasterace from 2006 to 2013.

== Mayor ==
Lanzetta was elected and famous for her strong anti-mafia stance, with 62.2% of the votes. She was one of three women to hold mayoral positions in this period in Calabria. In 2012, she was attacked, with a fire in her chemist shop. She soon resigned, in 2013.
