= Fabrizio Cicchitto =

Italian politician (born 1940)

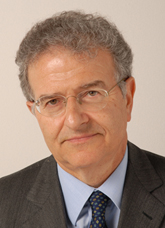

Member of the Chamber of Deputies
- In office 30 May 2001 – 22 March 2018
- In office 5 July 1976 – 11 July 1983

Member of the Senate of the Republic
- In office 23 April 1992 – 14 April 1994

Personal details
- Born: 26 October 1940 (age 85) Rome, Italy
- Party: Popular Alternative (since 2017); Transnational Radical Party (since 2017)
- Other political affiliations: PSI (until 1994); PSR (1994–1996); PS (1996–1999); FI (1999–2009); PdL (2009–2013); NCD (2013–2017)
- Spouse: Manuela Cicchitto (since the 1980s)
- Domestic partner: Marta Ajò (1970s)
- Children: A daughter
- Education: University of Rome
- Profession: Politician, former union organizer

Fabrizio Cicchitto (born 26 October 1940) is an Italian politician, whose career has followed a trajectory from radical socialism to centre-right reformism.

== Biography ==
Fabrizio Cicchitto entered politics in the early 1960s, supporting the Riccardo Lombardi-led Marxist left-wing of the Italian Socialist Party (PSI) and then becoming secretary of the party's youth organization (Federazione Giovanile Socialista Italiana, Italian Young Socialist Federation). Cicchitto also became sympathetic to Eurocommunism and the Historic Compromise path taken by the Italian Communist Party (PCI), while being highly critical of Christian Democracy (DC) itself, as well as of the American CIA and the Italian Servizio Informazioni Difesa. According to him, the DC exploited the Red Brigades' activities and the Aldo Moro case to cut off relations with the PCI.

In 1981, Cicchitto confessed to being a member of the masonic lodge Propaganda Due (P2). Shortly after this move, Cicchitto was excluded from the PSI. Readmitted toward the end of the 1980s, he followed the policies of Bettino Craxi and held minor posts throughout the Mani pulite-Tangentopoli scandals that saw the disestablishment of most Italian political parties. Cicchitto joined Silvio Berlusconi's centre-right party Forza Italia (FI), leading its social-democratic wing We Blue Reformers (NRB). He had been a PSI member of either the Chamber of Deputies or the Senate of the Republic for three successive terms. He was the vice president of Forza Italia's group in the chamber and national deputy coordinator of the party from 2003.

Cicchitto contributed to steps taken by Italy in its adoption of the European Monetary System and the Maastricht Treaty, and took part in debates over privatization in the country. Since 1998, Cicchitto began to contribute to editorials of Il Giornale, and is a member of the editorial staff for Avanti! In November 2009, he founded Reformism and Freedom (REL), a reformist and mainly social-democratic think tank within the People of Freedom (PdL). After the split of the PdL, Cicchitto joined the New Centre-Right (NCD) party. In 2017, he became a member of the moderate conservative Popular Alternative (AP) grouping, which was established following the dissolution of the NCD.

He currently contributes to editorials of Libero, Il Riformista and the Italian edition of the HuffPost.

== Works ==
- Il pensiero economico cattolico
- Politiche nuove per l'industria italiana
- Dall'utopia al potere
- Rapporto pubblico e privato e modernizzazione dell' industria italiana
- Rodolfo Morandi, il partito e la democrazia industriale
- Il governo Craxi
- Storia del centro-sinistra
- Riflessioni sulla fine della prima repubblica e sulla sinistra di governo
- De Gasperi e Togliatti, due protagonisti
- La DC dopo il primo ventennio
- Le scelte dei democratici
- Dal centro-sinistra all'alternativa
- Il grande inganno
