= Mario Catania =

Italian politician

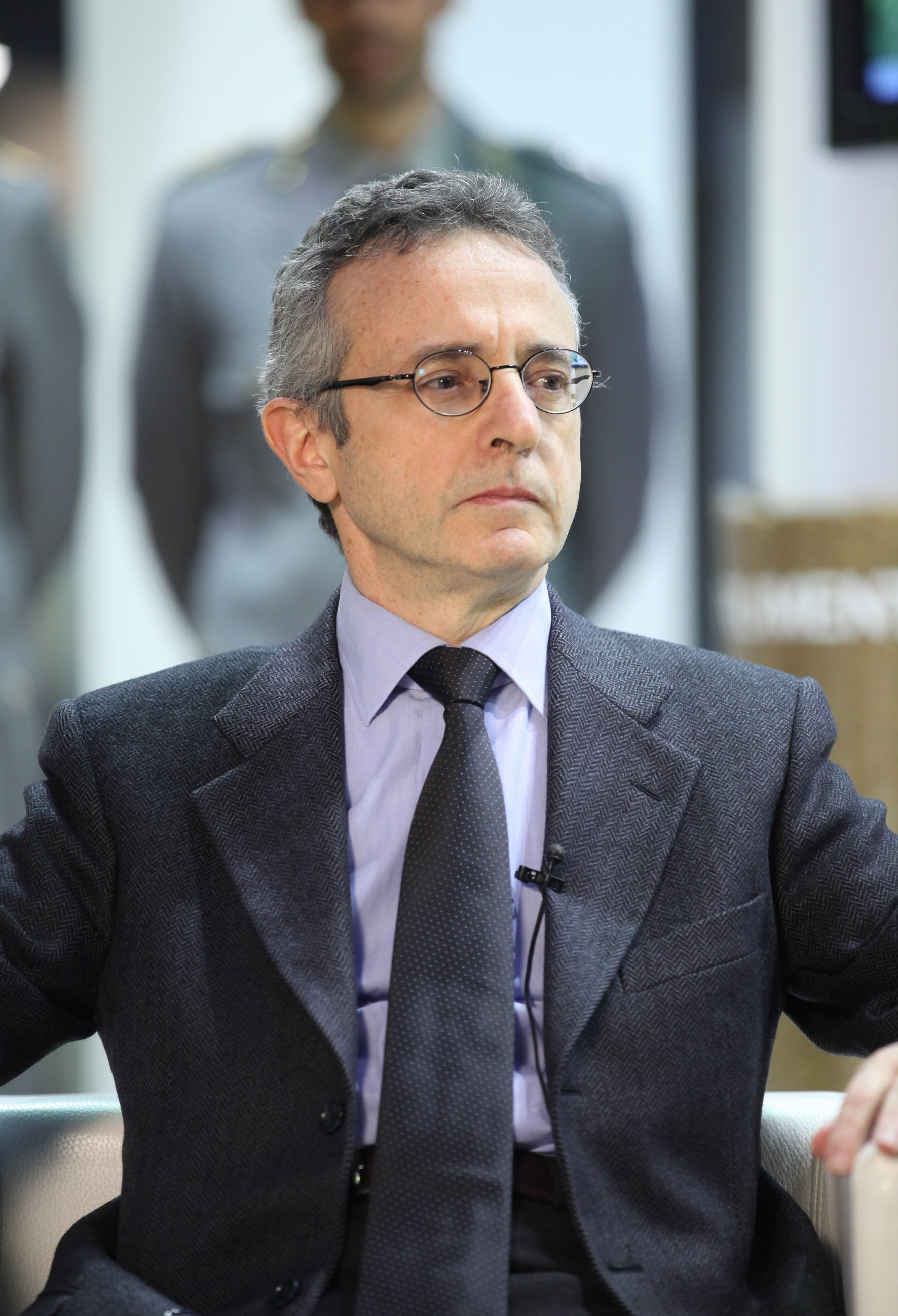

Minister of Agriculture
- In office 16 November 2011 – 28 April 2013
- Prime Minister: Mario Monti
- Preceded by: Francesco Saverio Romano
- Succeeded by: Nunzia De Girolamo

Member of the Chamber of Deputies
- In office 15 March 2013 – 22 March 2018

Personal details
- Born: 5 March 1952 (age 74)
- Party: UDC (2012–2013); SC (2013–2016); CD (since 2017)
- Education: Sapienza University of Rome

Mario Catania (born March 5, 1952) served as the Italian minister of agriculture under Prime Minister Mario Monti from November 2011 to April 28, 2013.

== Biography ==
Mario Catania was born on March 5, 1952, in Rome.

He was the head of department of European and international policies at the agriculture ministry. He was also part of the Italian Permanent Delegation to the EU in Brussels. In November 2011, he was appointed agriculture minister. He replaced Francesco Saverio Romano in the post.

In 2012, Catania joined Union of the Centre (UdC) and was elected deputy, on With Monti for Italy coalition's lists. Catania's term as agriculture minister ended on April 28, 2013, and Nunzia De Girolamo succeeded him in the post.
