= Massimiliano Salini =

Italian politician (born 1973)

Massimiliano Salini MEP
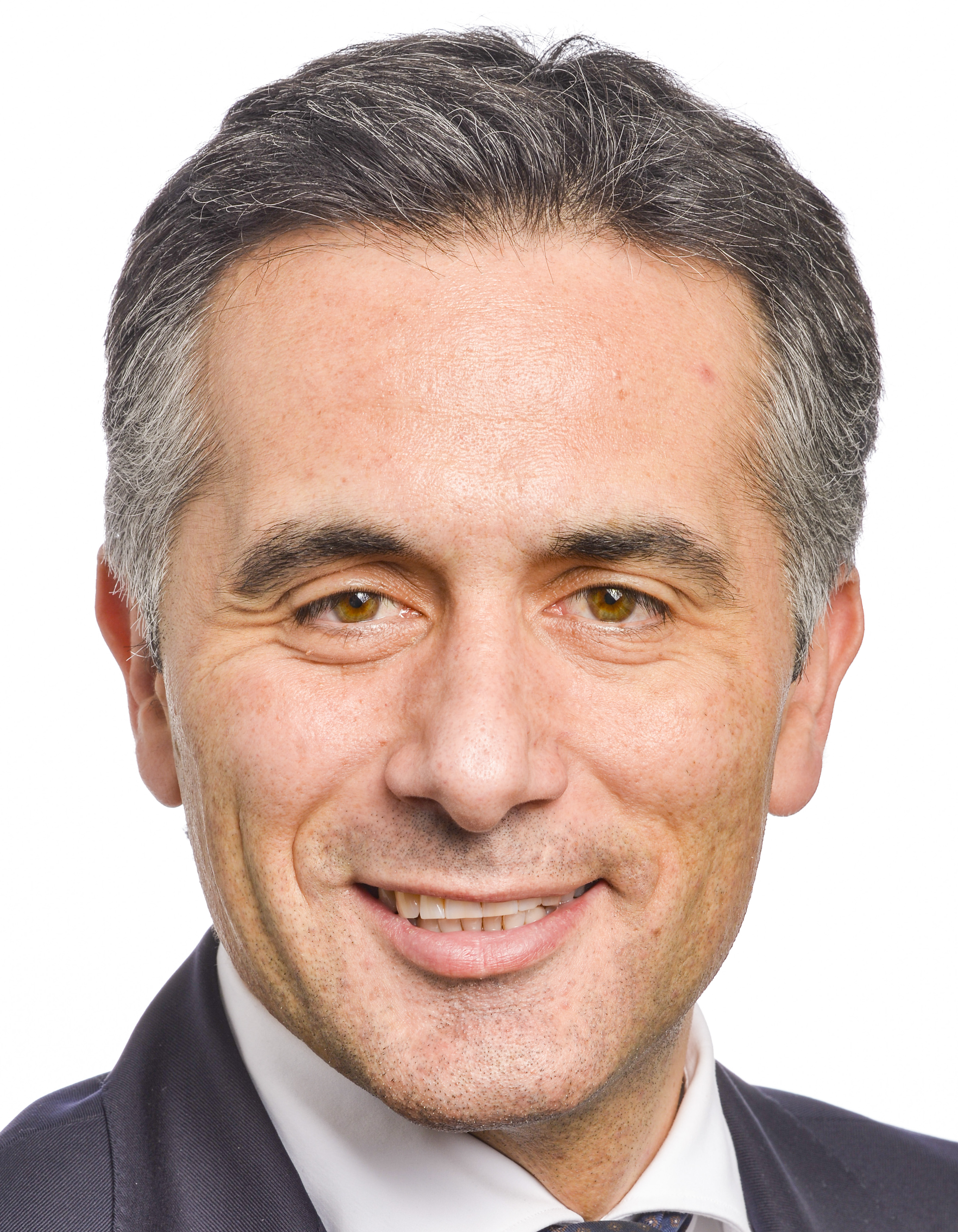

Member of the European Parliament
- Incumbent
- Assumed office 1 July 2014
- Constituency: North-West Italy

President of the Province of Cremona
- In office 7 June 2009 – 21 July 2014
- Preceded by: Giuseppe Torchio
- Succeeded by: Carlo Vezzini

Personal details
- Born: 11 March 1973 (age 53) Soresina, Italy
- Party: PdL (2009–2013); NCD (2013–2015); FI (since 2015)
- Education: University of Milan

Massimiliano Salini (born 11 March 1973 in Soresina) is an Italian politician.

In 2009, Salini was elected president of the Province of Cremona and held office until 2014. In 2014, he ran for the European elections in the North-West Italy Constituency on the New Centre-Right – Union of the Centre list; with 27,000 preference votes he was the first of the non-elected. In 2014 he became MEP taking over from Maurizio Lupi. In 2019, he was re-elected MEP on the Forza Italia list.
