= Federation of Freedom =

Italian political party

Federation of Freedom Federazione della Libertà
- Founded: 18 May 2017
- Dissolved: 23 March 2018
- Ideology: Liberal conservatism Christian democracy Conservative liberalism
- Political position: Centre-right (majority)

Federation of Freedom (Italian: Federazione della Libertà, FdL) was a centre-right parliamentary group in the Italian Senate.

The group was formed in May 2017 by five defectors from the Great Autonomies and Freedom (GAL) group, including four of Identity and Action (IdeA) and one of the Moderates (Mod); two splinters from Popular Alternative (AP); two senators from the Mixed Group, including one of the Italian Liberal Party (PLI); and one senator of Forza Italia (FI), the main successor of The People of Freedom (PdL). Eight of ten FdL members had been elected with the PdL in the 2013 general election.

Since its formation, with the only exception of the Moderates (affiliated to the centre-left Democratic Party, PD), the FdL aimed at strengthening its members' ties both with GAL and FI, and being part of the centre-right coalition with Lega Nord (LN) and Brothers of Italy (FdI) in the 2018 general election. Additionally, the FdL was seen as the embryo of the centre-right's "fourth leg" in the election, other than the LN, FI and Brothers of Italy (FdI).

The group was dissolved at the end of the parliamentary term, after the 2018 general election. In the election group leader Gaetano Quagliariello (IdeA) was re-elected with FI, while Cinzia Bonfrisco (PLI) with the LN.

== Composition ==
Party	Main ideology	MPs 2017	MPs 2018
Identity and Action	Christian democracy	4	4
Popular Alternative	Liberal conservatism	2	–
Forza Italia	Liberal conservatism	1	1
Italian Liberal Party	Liberalism	1	1
Moderates	Centrism	1	1
Other parties, non-party independents		–	2
Total		10	10
