= Lodo Alfano =

Unconstitutional law of the fourth Berlusconi government

The Lodo Alfano (roughly "Alfano Law"), named after the Minister of Justice Angelino Alfano, was an Italian law, valid between 2008 and 2009, granting immunity from prosecution to the four highest political offices in Italy (the president of Italian Republic, the two speakers of the Italian Parliament, and the Prime Minister of Italy). It was widely criticized as a copy of the Lodo Schifani, declared unconstitutional in 2004, which was seen by critics as a law aimed primarily at stopping trials involving the then Italian prime minister Silvio Berlusconi. The Lodo Alfano was declared unconstitutional by the Italian Constitutional Court in October 2009.
