= Nunzia De Girolamo =

Italian TV host, lawyer and politician (born 1975)

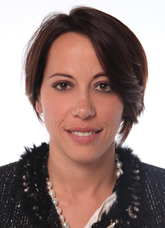

Minister of Agriculture
- In office 28 April 2013 – 26 January 2014
- Prime Minister: Enrico Letta
- Preceded by: Mario Catania
- Succeeded by: Maurizio Martina

Member of the Chamber of Deputies
- In office 29 April 2008 – 23 March 2018
- Constituency: Campania 2

Personal details
- Born: 10 October 1975 (age 50) Benevento, Italy
- Party: Forza Italia (2007–2009); PdL (2009–2013); NCD (2013–2015); Forza Italia (2015–2018)
- Spouse: Francesco Boccia (m. 2011)
- Children: 1
- Education: University of Rome La Sapienza
- Profession: Lawyer
- Website: Official website

Nunzia De Girolamo (born 10 October 1975) is an Italian lawyer and politician who served as the minister of agricultural, food and forestry policies from late April 2013 to 26 January 2014.

== Early life and education ==
De Girolamo was born on 10 October 1975 in Benevento. She has a law degree from the University of Rome.

== Career ==
De Girolamo joined politics in 2007. She was a member of the Italian Parliament, representing Silvio Berlusconi's People of Freedom (PdL). She was elected to the parliament in the 2008 election and 2013 election, but failed to win her seat in the 2018 elections.

On 28 April 2013, De Girolamo was appointed minister of agricultural, food and forestry policies to the cabinet led by Enrico Letta, replacing Mario Catania in the post. She was one of seven female members and the youngest member of the Letta cabinet.

In October 2013, she denied rumors that she would resign from the PdL. However, in November 2013, she left PdL and joined the New Centre-Right headed by Angelino Alfano.

De Girolamo resigned from office on 26 January 2014, due to the claims of improper conduct on her part. Her resignation was accepted by the prime minister on 27 January, and she became the second minister to resign from the cabinet since the April 2013 elections. She then began to serve as the House whip for her party, New Centre Right Party.

Since February 13, 2021, she is the host of the television programme Ciao maschio, aired on Rai 1.

== Personal life ==
De Girolamo married Francesco Boccia, a member of the Italian Parliament from the Democratic Party, on 23 December 2011. They have a daughter named Gea. De Girolamo considers herself Roman Catholic.
