= Guglielmo Vaccaro =

Italian politician (born 1967)

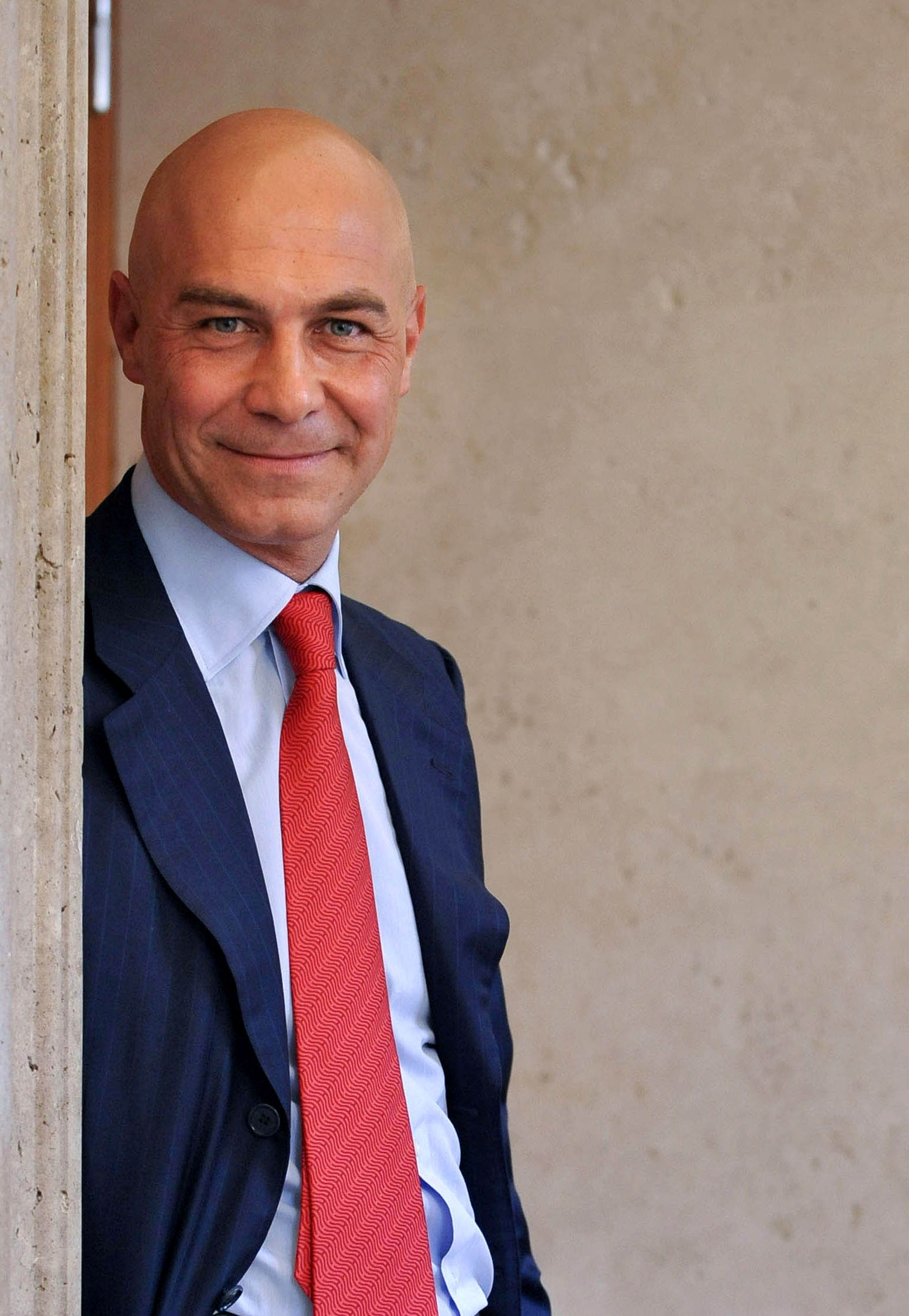
Guglielmo Vaccaro

Guglielmo Vaccaro (born 23 February 1967 in Pompei) is a centre-left Italian politician of the Democratic Party in the faction around the Prime Minister of Italy, Enrico Letta.

== Biography ==
Born in Pompei, well known for its archaeological site, he graduated cum laude in economics and trade from the University of Salerno. As a post graduate in the 1990s he lived about two years in Brussels, gained a qualification for development projects financed by the European Development Fund. The supranational reality he experienced thanks to Erasmus Program and an internship (stage) at the European Commission, sharpened his interest in youth mobility and his Europeanist spirit.

== Political career ==
In 1992 he was appointed provincial secretary of the Youth Movement of the Christian Democracy Party (Democrazia Cristiana). In 1996 he joined the Technical Support Group at the Ministry of Agricultural Policies. From 1998 to 2005, he was managing director for the Territorial Pact of Agro S.p.a.

From 1999 to 2001, when Enrico Letta was Minister of Industry, he was appointed consultant at the Technical Secretariat of the Ministry of Industry. From 2001 to 2003 he was chairman of the Industrial District Management Committee of Nocera Inferiore-Gragnano and member of the board of the Italian Club of Industrial District. At the regional election held in 2005, he was elected Regional Councillor of Campania, in The Daisy Party list (La Margherita), with 10,542 votes.

In 2006 he joined the national executive of The Daisy, becoming the person in charge of the Department of EU Committee Policies. In 2007 he was member of the Treasury Committee of The Daisy Party.

He has been elected two times to the Chamber of Deputies: in 2008 and in 2013.

Vaccaro was member of the Finance Committee and Justice Committee. He is currently member of XIV Committee - EU Policies and of The Parliamentary Election Committee (giunta).

== Projects and laws ==
He works on varied issues: tax authorities, renewable energies, citizenship rights, youth mobility, justice and private practices. But his most important goal is the creation and passage of the 238/2010 Law, known as Legge Controesodo. It is a law that fosters the return to Italy of expatriates, students or professionals, by granting them tax breaks.

The present Premier Enrico Letta is signatory of Controesodo.

Vaccaro is coordinator, with Raffaello Vignali, of the Parliamentary Intergroup for Subsidiarity (formerly led by Maurizio Lupi and Enrico Letta).

He is also deviser and co-founder together with Enrico Letta and Alessia Mosca of the TrecentoSessanta Association which is a reformist project that arranges focus groups and seminars, aiming at promoting talented youth and overcoming local particularism by virtue of a national and international far-ranging culture. The association aims, among other things, at promoting employment and providing skills and key competences in accordance with the long-life learning program of the Europe 2020 Strategy.

On March 25, 2013, he presented the draft bill "Amendments to the Article 615-ter of the Penal Code and the Legislative Decree dated 30 June 2003, n. 196, Personal Data Protection Code". He presented also regarding the Act No. 91 of 5 February 1992 - Citizenship, a draft bill to expand citizenship to foreign majors who have had all their university studies in Italy, and have graduated with a final grade of 110/110. The bill provides also for the acquisition of citizenship, at birth, following the declaration of the desire to become a citizen, by a parent.

He is the promoter of Fondazione Pompei the statute of which has been passed on 23 July 2013, by the administration of Pompei. Fondazione Pompei aims at promoting the protection of the archaeological sites of Pompei, Oplonti, Ercolano, and the management of the sites.

He is also planning the creation of new networks providing data about the archaeological heritage and methods for monitoring sites conditions through cyberinfrastructures.

== Personal life ==
Guglielmo Vaccaro has two children, Raffaele (1994) and Altea (1998). He speaks English fluently and as an Anglophile he loves to walk around the streets of London, holding a particular passion for the National Geographic Store in Brompton Road.
