= Federation of Christian Populars =

Italian political party

Federation of Christian Populars Federazione dei Cristiano Popolari
- President: Mario Baccini
- Founded: 20 June 2008
- Dissolved: 15 November 2013
- Split from: The Rose for Italy
- Merged into: New Centre-Right
- Ideology: Christian Democracy; Pro-Europeanism
- Political position: Centre
- National affiliation: The People of Freedom (2009-2013)

Website
- www.fdcp.it

The Federation of Christian Populars (Italian: Federazione dei Cristiano Popolari, FDCP) was a short-lived Christian-democratic political party in Italy which has been a faction within The People of Freedom (PdL), a broad centre-right party led by Silvio Berlusconi, and later became part of the New Centre-Right (NCD).

The party was founded by Mario Baccini, after that he left the Rose for Italy and took part to the foundation of the PdL. The party was joined by Antonio Satta and his Sardinian Autonomist Populars, a splinter group from UDEUR. In October 2008 the FCP officially decided to merge into the PdL. In October 2012 the balance of accounts of the PdL showed that the Christian Populars had received €40,000 of financial support from the mother-party.

In August 2009 Satta launched the Christian Popular Union, which joined the Union of the Centre (UdC) instead.

In November 2013 the Christian Populars left the PdL and joined the newly formed New Centre-Right.

== Leadership ==
- President: Mario Baccini (2008–2009)
  - Vice President: Antonio Satta (2008–2009), Fabio Desideri (2008–2009)
- Coordinator: Fabio Rastelli (2008–2009)
