= Barbara Saltamartini =

Italian politician (born 1972)

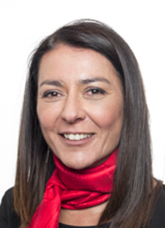
- Saltamartini in 2018

Member of the Chamber of Deputies
- In office 29 April 2008 – 12 October 2022
- Constituency: Sicily 2 (2008–2013); Lazio 2 (2013–2018); Lazio 1 – P02 (2018–2022)

Personal details
- Born: 27 August 1972 (age 54)
- Party: Brothers of Italy (since 2023)

Barbara Saltamartini (born 27 August 1972) is an Italian politician. From 2008 to 2022, she was a member of the Chamber of Deputies. From 2018 to 2020, she served as chairwoman of the Productive Activities Committee.

== Biography ==
Born on August 27, 1972, in Rome, where she earned her high school diploma from the “J.F. Kennedy” State Science High School, she lived there until 2023; now separated, she has worked in the field of “communications and the organization of corporate events and meetings.”
