= Eugenia Roccella =

Italian journalist and politician (born 1953)

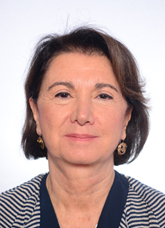
- Official portrait, 2022

Minister for Family, Natality and Equal Opportunities
- Incumbent
- Assumed office 22 October 2022
- Prime Minister: Giorgia Meloni
- Preceded by: Elena Bonetti

Member of the Chamber of Deputies
- Incumbent
- Assumed office 13 October 2022
- In office 29 April 2008 – 22 March 2018

Personal details
- Born: Eugenia Maria Roccella; November 15, 1953 (age 72) Bologna, Italy
- Party: FdI (since 2022)
- Other political affiliations: Radical (1979–1992); PdL (2008–2013); NCD (2013–2015); IDeA (2015–2020)
- Spouse: Luigi Cavallari
- Education: Sapienza University of Rome

Eugenia Maria Roccella (born 15 November 1953) is an Italian journalist and politician, who has been serving as Minister for Family, Natality and Equal Opportunities in the Meloni government since 22 October 2022. She is a member of Brothers of Italy (FdI).

In the 2008 Italian general election, Roccella was first elected to the Chamber of Deputies, where she has represented several parties on the political right. She opposes abortion and same-sex unions.

== Biography ==
Roccella was born in Bologna, and raised in Riesi, Sicily, the hometown of her father Franco Roccella. He was a founder of the Radical Party and served in the Chamber of Deputies from 1979 to 1983 and again from 1984 to 1987. He moved to the Italian Socialist Party in 1986, and was the mayor of his hometown from 1991 to 1992. Her mother Wanda Raheli was a feminist painter. Roccella graduated in Modern Literature from the Sapienza University of Rome. She ran unsuccessfully as a candidate for her father's party in the 1979 election.

Since 2000, Roccella has been a professional journalist. She has written for Il Giornale, Libero, Il Foglio and Avvenire.

In 2007, Roccella was the spokesperson of Family Day, a demonstration in favour of the traditional Catholic family. She returned to politics by being elected in the 2008 Italian general election for Silvio Berlusconi's The People of Freedom (PdL), and was Undersecretary for Welfare (2008) and Health (2009). She joined the New Centre-Right (NCD) in 2013 and was one of the founders of Identity and Action (IDeA) in 2015.

On 22 October 2022, Roccella was sworn in as the Minister for Family, Natality and Equal Opportunities in the Meloni Cabinet. While Giorgia Meloni became the first female prime minister of Italy, Roccella was one of only six out of 24 ministers to be female, two fewer than the previous government led by Mario Draghi.

== Political positions ==
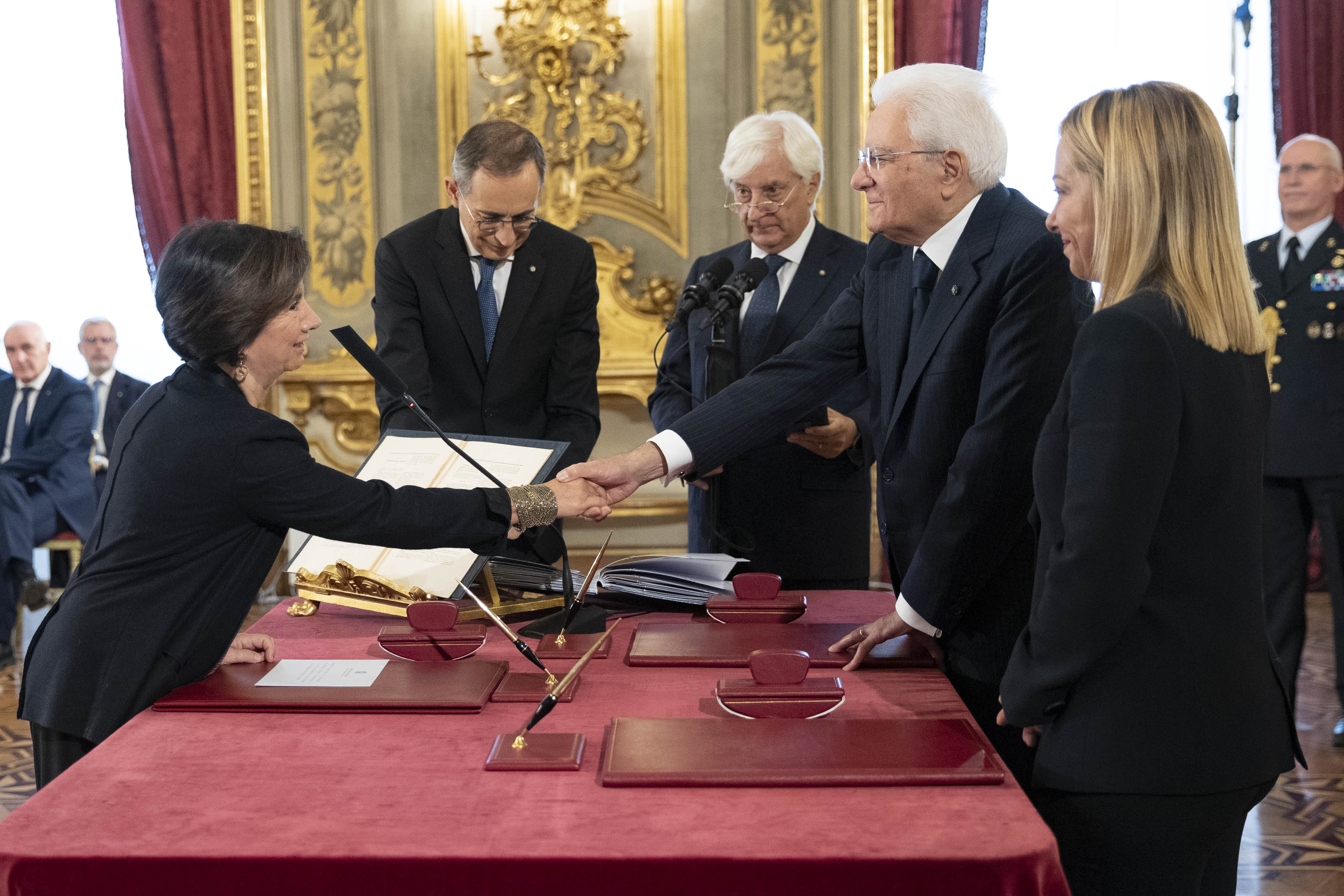
Roccella swearing in as minister at the Quirinal Palace, in October 2022

Roccella has described herself as a conservative feminist and a post-feminist. She is opposed to abortion, saying "I am a feminist and feminists have never considered abortion to be a right". She also opposes in vitro fertilisation, and in 2013 founded Di mamma ce n'è una sola (There's only one mother), an organisation against surrogacy. In the 1970s, she supported abortion, and wrote a book titled Aborto, facciamolo da noi (Abortion, let's do it ourselves). In 2006, she wrote La favola dell'aborto facile. Miti e realtà della pillola Ru486 ("The tall tale of easy abortion. Myths and realities of the RU486 pill").

In 2005, she wrote, along with Lucetta Scaraffia, Contro il cristianesimo. L'ONU e l'Unione Europea come nuova ideologia ("Against Christianity. The UN and the European Union as a new ideology") in which they strongly criticise the United Nations and the European Union, accusing them of supporting anti-Christian positions.

In 2018, Roccella said that she would work to repeal the recognition of same-sex civil unions in Italy, which had been legalised two years earlier. She opposed the Scalfarotto and Zan bills that supported LGBT rights in Italy, describing the latter as a curb on freedom of expression.

In 2023, Roccella stated that psychologists affirm the need or right for children to have a father and a mother, as opposed to same-sex parents. Her statement was rebutted by the psychological profession, first through the representatives of their professional boards in several Italian regions, then by the president of the whole national board, David Lazzari. The government she is part of ordered for Milan city council, led by mayor Giuseppe Sala, to cease registering same-sex couples a legal parents, an action it had practiced since 2018 in the absence of a national law. Roccella said that the order did not come from legislation but from a Supreme Court of Cassation decision on the matter, which opponent mayor of Rome Roberto Gualtieri said only applied to registering two mothers in the case of surrogacy.

Roccella opposes euthanasia. She was Undersecretary for Health in 2009 during the controversy surrounding Eluana Englaro, a woman who spent 17 years in a persistent vegetative state because the state refused her family's wish to remove her feeding tube. Roccella said that if Italian law did not permit the sale of a moped without written documentation, it should not permit the right to die without written documentation.

She criticises "the display of American cultural imperialism with its classic appendages of transgenderism, fluidity, and multiculturalism".

== Personal life ==
Her husband Luigi Cavallari went missing on 27 June 2026 in Lake Vico after jumping from the boat he was in; his body was found on 4 August. He was 84.
