= New Centre-Right =

New Centre-Right Nuovo Centrodestra
- President: Angelino Alfano
- Founded: 15 November 2013
- Dissolved: 18 March 2017
- Split from: The People of Freedom
- Succeeded by: Popular Alternative
- Headquarters: Via Arcione 71; 00186 Rome
- Newspaper: l'Occidentale (online)
- Youth wing: NCD Young People
- Membership (2014): 100,000
- Ideology: Conservatism; Christian democracy
- Political position: Centre-right
- National affiliation: Popular Area
- European affiliation: European People's Party
- Colours: Blue

Website
- www.nuovocentrodestra.it

New Centre-Right (Italian: Nuovo Centrodestra, NCD) was a centre-right political party in Italy. The party was launched on 15 November 2013 by a group of dissidents of The People of Freedom (PdL) who opposed the party's reformation as Forza Italia (FI), which would take place the following day. The NCD leader was Angelino Alfano, who had been Silvio Berlusconi's protégé and national secretary of the PdL from 2011 to 2013.

The NCD was a member of the European People's Party (EPP). The party participated in the Letta, Renzi and Gentiloni governments. On 18 March 2017, the NCD was dissolved into Popular Alternative (AP).

== History ==
=== Background and foundation ===
The party was formed by splinters from the PdL on 15 November 2013. Its founders, lately known as "doves" in the party, were strong supporters of Enrico Letta's government and refused to join the new Forza Italia (FI), founded upon the dissolution of the PdL. All five PdL ministers, three under-secretaries, 30 senators and 27 deputies immediately joined the NCD. Most were Christian democrats and many came from the southern regions of Calabria and Sicily.

Besides Alfano (Deputy Prime Minister and Minister of Interior), leading members included Maurizio Lupi (Minister of Infrastructure and Transport), Nunzia De Girolamo (Minister of Agriculture), Beatrice Lorenzin (Minister of Health), Gaetano Quagliariello (Minister of Constitutional Reforms), Giuseppe Scopelliti (President of Calabria), Roberto Formigoni (former President of Lombardy), Renato Schifani (former President of the Senate and PdL floor leader until November 2013), Fabrizio Cicchitto (former PdL leader in the Chamber in 2008–2013) and Carlo Giovanardi (a former minister for the UDC).

=== Support to Renzi and Popular Area ===
In February 2014, after the fall of Letta's government, the NCD joined a new coalition government led by Matteo Renzi, who had been elected secretary of the Democratic Party (PD) in December 2013. In the new government the NCD retained three ministers: Alfano at the Interior, Lupi at Infrastructures and Transports, and Lorenzin at Health. Quagliariello, who had not been confirmed as minister of Institutional Reforms, was elected national coordinator by the assembly of the parliamentary groups.

The party ran in the 2014 European Parliament election on a joint list with the Union of the Centre (UdC). The list obtained 4.4% of the vote and three MEPs, two for the NCD and one for the UdC. The list did especially well in the South: 7.1% in Apulia, 11.4% in Calabria and 9.1% in Sicily.

On 11 September 2014, the NCD was officially accepted into the European People's Party (EPP).

In December 2014 the NCD formed joint parliamentary groups with the UdC in both the Chamber of Deputies and Senate. The two groups, a step toward a complete merger of the two parties, were named Popular Area, where "popular" was a reference to popolarismo, the Italian variety of Christian democracy.

=== Internal squabbles and splits ===
Following Alfano's decision to support Sergio Mattarella's bid to become President of Italy during the 2015 presidential election (Matteralla was effectively elected on 31 January), the NCD experienced an internal crisis. Most notably, Barbara Saltamartini and Maurizio Sacconi resigned from party's spokesperson and leader in the Senate, respectively. Schifani was unanimously elected to succeed to Sacconi, while Saltamartini left the party altogether. In March Lupi was hit by a minor corruption scandal and resigned from minister of Infrastructures and Transports. As result, the party was left with only two ministers. In April De Girolamo, a frequent critic of the government since Mattarella's election, was replaced as leader in the Chamber by Lupi. During the summer, one deputy (De Girolamo, who had been a founder of The Republicans) and one MEP (Massimiliano Salini) re-joined FI.

A bigger blow to Alfano came in October, when Quaglieriello resigned from coordinator and threatened to lead a splinter group out of the party if the NCD were to continue its support to Renzi. In the following weeks, Quaglieriello deserted a meeting of the party's national board and made clear he was leaving the party. Two deputies (Vincenso Piso and Eugenia Roccella) and two colleagues of Quaglieriello (Andrea Augello and Giovanardi) in the Senate followed suit. These, along with a fourth senator (Luigi Compagna, a former Liberal) finally launched Identity and Action (IDEA).

In February 2016, during a government reshuffle, NCD's Enrico Costa was appointed minister of Regional Affairs and Autonomies. Shortly afterwards, it was announced by Lorenzin that the party would soon change its name, dropping the word "right", or take part to the formation of an entirely new party.

After NCD's dismal results in the 2016 local elections, several MPs, mainly senators, started weighing on leaving the party. In July 2016 Schifani, who criticised the party's permanence in the government and aimed at re-unifying the Italian fractured centre-right, stepped down from leader in the Senate and was replaced by Laura Bianconi, a close ally of Alfano. A couple of weeks later, Schifani left the party, along with another senator, and returned to FI.

=== Road to the new party ===
In the run-up of the 2016 constitutional referendum the UdC campaigned for the "no", while the NCD was among the keenest supporters of the "yes". After the referendum, which saw a huge defeat by the "no" side, the UdC left AP altogether, but some splinters named Centrists for Italy, notably including Pier Ferdinando Casini and minister Gian Luca Galletti, stayed with AP. The referendum's result and the demise of Renzi Cabinet revived NCD's internal tensions too, that led to splits (one deputy left in December, one senator in February). In the following government led by Democrat Paolo Gentiloni, Alfano was sworn in as minister of Foreign Affairs, while Lorenzin, Galletti (CpI) and Costa were confirmed as ministers of Health, the Environment and Regional Affairs, respectively.

On 18 March 2017 the party was dissolved in order to make way for Popular Alternative (AP), which consisted mostly of the former NCD.

== Ideology and factions ==
Despite being home to some social democrats (Reformism and Freedom, We Reformers), the party was mainly a Christian-democratic party with a social-conservative streak. According to Corriere della Sera, differently from FI, NCD's stances on the "so-called ethical issues" (abortion, LGBT rights, etc.) were "closer to those of the European traditionalist right" and "thus not very compatible with those of the EPP's parties in big countries such as Germany". However, the party voted in favor of civil unions, whereas most FI members voted against it. The NCD was also criticised by some Catholic associations for not opposing enough the teaching of gender studies in schools. In addition, the NCD, as part of centre-left governments, proved more progressive than FI on the management of illegal immigration, which was negatively evaluated by Berlusconi's party. Precisely for these and other reasons, several NCD politicians left the party to either form Identity and Action (IdeA) led by Gaetano Quagliariello or re-joined FI (e.g. Nunzia De Girolamo, Renato Schifani and Massimiliano Salini), in both cases re-aligning with the FI-led centre-right coalition.

Former PdL-affiliated factions or think tanks which joined the NCD included:

- Network Italy (Rete Italia) – ideology: Christian democracy; leader: Roberto Formigoni;
- Liberal Populars (Popolari Liberali) – ideology: Christian democracy; leader: Carlo Giovanardi;
- Christian Populars (Cristiano Popolari) – ideology: Christian democracy; leader: Mario Baccini;
- Christian Reformists (Cristiano Riformisti) – ideology: Christian democracy; leader: Antonio Mazzocchi;
- Magna Carta (Magna Carta) – ideology: Liberal conservatism; leader: Gaetano Quagliariello;
- Reformism and Freedom (Riformismo e Libertà) – ideology: Social democracy; leader: Fabrizio Cicchitto;
- We Reformers (Noi Riformatori) – ideology: Social democracy; leader: Francesco Colucci.

In January 2014 three bigwigs of the party who later left the party (Quagliariello, Eugenia Roccella and Maurizio Sacconi) published a book titled Moderati. Per un nuovo umanesimo politico ("Moderates: For a new political humanism"), a sort of manifesto of the party. The book, whose key words are "person", "family", "enterprise" and "tradition", emphasises institutional reforms (including direct election of the President and federalism), ethical issues (marriage, opposition to abortion, limits to assisted reproductive technology, etc.) and the need for a smaller state ("less public law, more private rights"). According to Benedetto Ippolito, a university professor of history of philosophy, while NCD members insist that their party is "moderate", it is in fact "conservative" and "anti-progressive", albeit not "berlusconiano".

In February 2014 the NCD unveiled a platform on labour, including a universal protection system safety net for the unemployed, a tax relief for entrepreneurs hiring the young, the reduction of the tax wedge on labour and the overcoming of article 18 of the "Statute of Workers", making easier for entrepreneurs to hire and fire employees.

== Electoral results ==
=== European Parliament ===
European Parliament
Election year	Votes	%	Seats	+/–	Leader
2014	1,202,350 (5th)	4.38 (Note: Joint list with Union of the Centre.)	2 / 73	–	Angelino Alfano

=== Regional Councils ===
Region	Election year	Votes	%	Seats
Abruzzo	2014 (Note: Joint list with Union of the Centre.)	40,219 (4th)	5.9	1 / 31
Apulia	2015 (Note: Joint list of Francesco Schittulli's movement (Popular Area).)	101,817 (7th)	6.0	4 / 51
Calabria	2014	47,574 (6th)	6.1	3 / 30
Campania	2015	133,753 (5th)	5.9	1 / 51
Emilia-Romagna	2014	31,635 (7th)	2.6	0 / 50
Liguria	2015 (Note: Joint list with Union of the Centre (Popular Area).)	9,269 (9th)	1.7	1 / 31
Marche	2015 (Note: Joint list with Marche 2020 (Popular Area).)	21,049 (7th)	4.0	1 / 31
Piedmont	2014	49,059 (7th)	2.5	0 / 50
Tuscany	2015	15,808 (8th)	1.2	0 / 41
Umbria	2015	9,285 (9th)	2.6	0 / 20
Veneto	2015	37.937 (11th)	2.0	1 / 51

== Leadership ==
- President: Renato Schifani (acting, 2013–2014), Angelino Alfano (2014–2017)
  - Coordinator: Gaetano Quagliariello (2014–2015)
  - Spokesperson: Barbara Saltamartini (2014–2015), Valentina Castaldini (2015–2017)
- Party Leader in the Chamber of Deputies: Enrico Costa (2013–2014), Nunzia De Girolamo (2014–2015), Maurizio Lupi (2015–2017)
- Party Leader in the Senate: Maurizio Sacconi (2013–2015), Renato Schifani (2015–2016), Laura Bianconi (2016–2017)
- Party Leader in the European Parliament: Giovanni La Via (2013–2017)

== Symbols ==
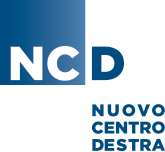
Official logo

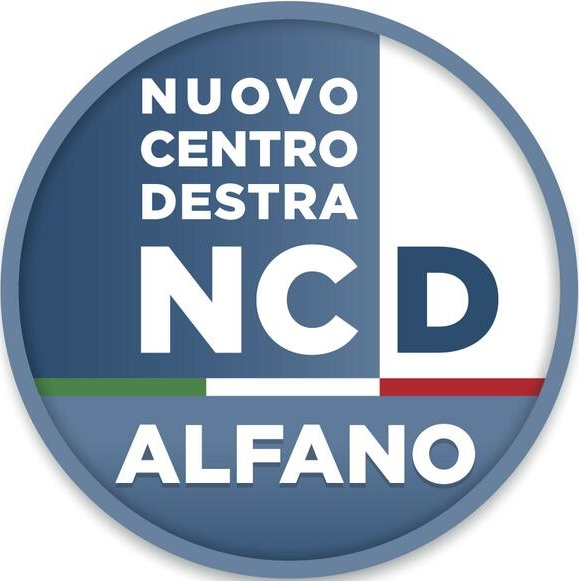
Electoral logo
