= We Reformers =

We Reformers (Noi Riformatori) was a social-democratic association connected to New Centre-Right (NCD), a political party in Italy. Francesco Colucci was its president and his son Alessandro, a regional minister of Lombardy, was its national secretary.

The faction was organized in 2005 within Forza Italia, the centre-right party created by Silvio Berlusconi, as We Blue Reformers (Noi Riformatori Azzurri). It was composed basically of those former members of the Italian Socialist Party who believed that the best way to defend their social-democratic tradition (after the disappearance of their party in 1994 and the alleged new hegemony over the centre-left exercised by former Communists, turned Democrats of the Left in 1991), was to rally under the banner of Forza Italia. When this party was merged into The People of Freedom (PdL) in 2009, We Reformers subsequently joined it too.

In November 2013 We Reformers left the PdL and joined NCD.
