= Angelino Alfano =

Italian politician (born 1970)

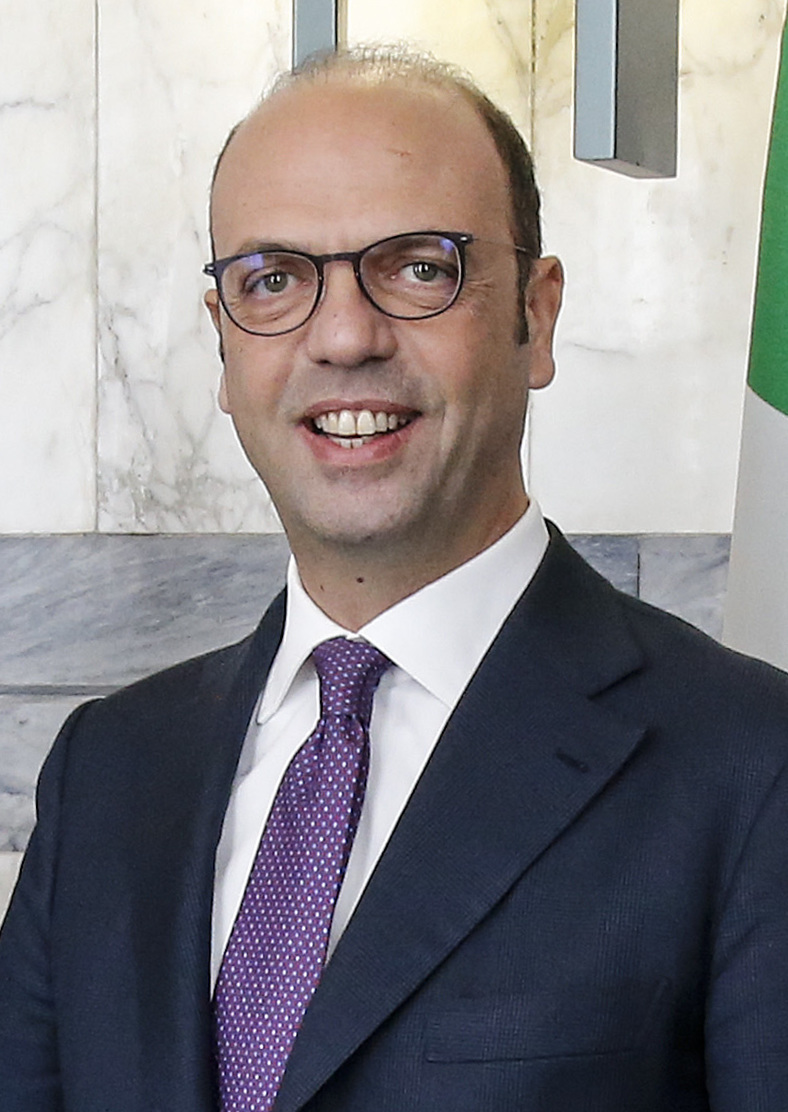

Minister of Foreign Affairs
- In office 12 December 2016 – 1 June 2018
- Prime Minister: Paolo Gentiloni
- Preceded by: Paolo Gentiloni
- Succeeded by: Enzo Moavero Milanesi

Chairperson-in-Office of the Organization for Security and Co-operation in Europe
- In office 1 January 2018 – 1 June 2018
- Preceded by: Karin Kneissl
- Succeeded by: Enzo Moavero Milanesi

Minister of the Interior
- In office 28 April 2013 – 12 December 2016
- Prime Minister: Enrico Letta; Matteo Renzi
- Preceded by: Anna Maria Cancellieri
- Succeeded by: Marco Minniti

Deputy Prime Minister of Italy
- In office 28 April 2013 – 22 February 2014
- Prime Minister: Enrico Letta
- Preceded by: Massimo D'Alema (2008); Francesco Rutelli (2008)
- Succeeded by: Luigi Di Maio (2018); Matteo Salvini (2018)

Minister of Justice
- In office 8 May 2008 – 27 July 2011
- Prime Minister: Silvio Berlusconi
- Preceded by: Luigi Scotti
- Succeeded by: Nitto Francesco Palma

Member of the Chamber of Deputies
- In office 30 May 2001 – 22 March 2018
- Constituency: Sicily 1 (2001–2013); Piedmont 1 (2013–2018)

Personal details
- Born: 31 October 1970 (age 55) Agrigento, Italy
- Party: DC (before 1994); FI (1994–2009); PDL (2009–2013); NCD (2013–2017); AP (since 2017)
- Spouse: Tiziana Miceli
- Children: 2
- Education: Catholic University of the Sacred Heart; University of Palermo

Angelino Alfano (Italian pronunciation: [andʒeˈliːno alˈfaːno]; born 31 October 1970) is an Italian former politician who served as Minister of Foreign Affairs from 12 December 2016 to 1 June 2018.

Alfano was Minister of the Interior from 28 April 2013 to 12 December 2016, serving in the governments of Matteo Renzi and Enrico Letta; from 2013 to 2014 he held the office of Deputy Prime Minister of Italy, as part of the Letta Cabinet, and previously served as Minister of Justice from 2008 to 2011 as part of the Berlusconi IV Cabinet. He was the first and only secretary of the centre-right party The People of Freedom (PdL) from 2011 to 2013. In November 2013 he became Leader of the New Centre-Right party which is a split from the PdL, until March 2017 when NCD was dissolved and Popular Alternative was founded.

Alfano is the first Italian politician to have held the offices of Minister of Justice, Minister of the Interior, and Minister of Foreign Affairs, which are considered among the most important ministries in the Cabinet of Italy.

== Early life and education ==
Alfano was born in Agrigento, Sicily, on 31 October 1970; his father, Angelo Alfano, was a lawyer and local politician for the Christian Democracy, who also held the position of deputy mayor of Agrigento.

After receiving a law degree from Milan's Università Cattolica and a doctorate in Corporate law from the University of Palermo, Alfano started his political experience, as his father, with the Christian Democracy party.

== Political career ==
After some years in the Christian Democracy party, in 1994, when DC changed his name in the centre-left oriented Italian People's Party, Alfano joined Forza Italia, the new centre-right party founded by the media tycoon Silvio Berlusconi, and was elected to the Agrigento Province Council. In 1996, Alfano was the youngest member elected to the Sicilian Regional Assembly.

In 2001, he became a member of the Italian Chamber of Deputies, after the victory of the centre-right House of Freedoms coalition led by Berlusconi in the 2001 general election. From 2005 to 2008 he also held the position of regional coordinator in Sicily of the Forza Italia party.

=== Minister of Justice ===
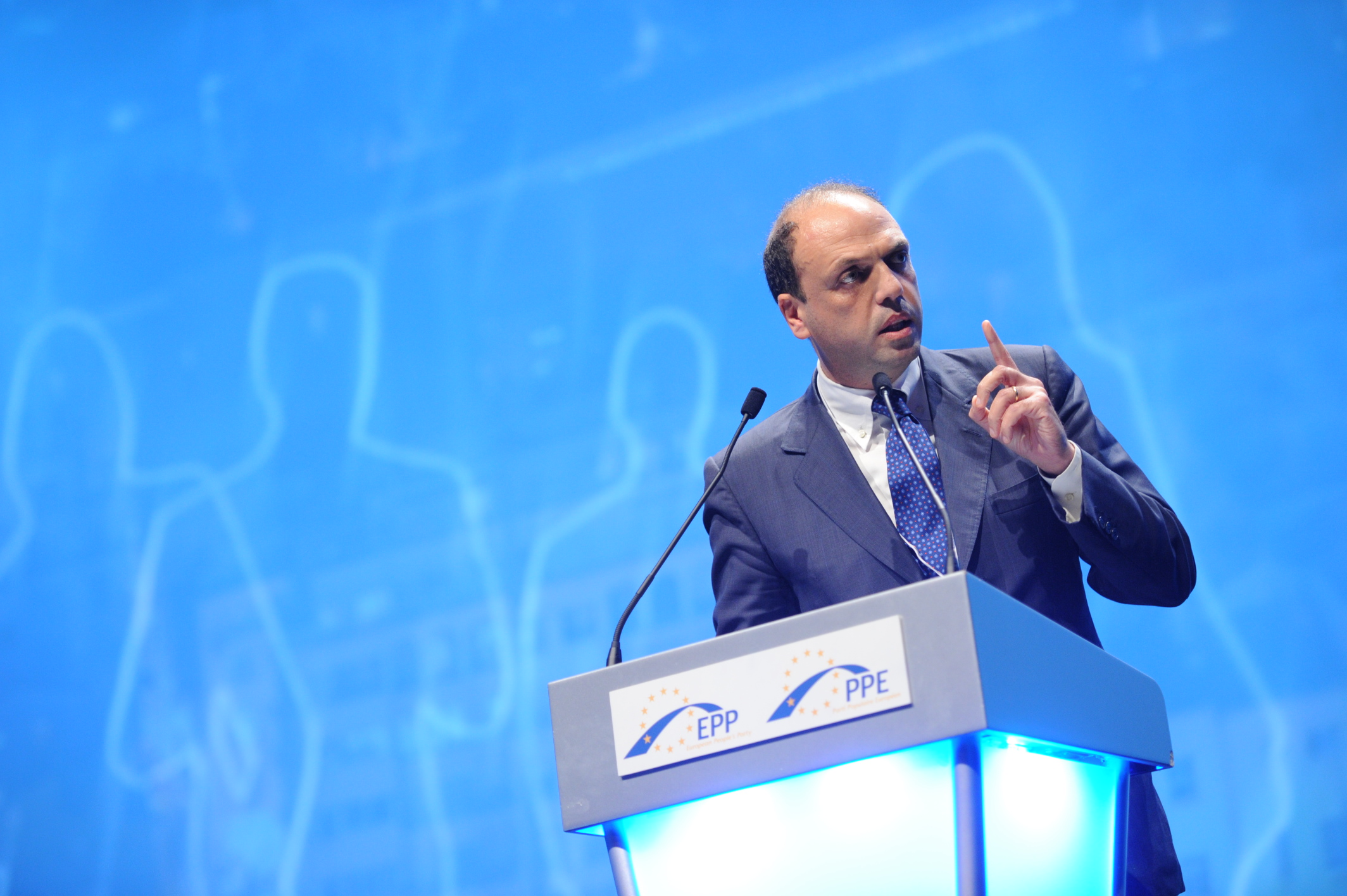
Alfano at the European People's Party Congress in Marseille, in 2011.

After the 2008 elections victory by the Berlusconi-led centre-right coalition, Alfano was again elected to Parliament. In May 2008, aged 37, he became the youngest Minister of Justice in the history of the Italian Republic.

The so-called Lodo Alfano, named after him, was a piece of legislation in force between 2008 and 2009 that granted immunity from prosecution to the four highest political offices in Italy (President of the Republic, Presidents of the two Houses of Parliament, and Prime Minister). It was widely criticised as a copy of the Lodo Schifani, declared unconstitutional in 2004, and was seen by critics as an ad personam law aimed primarily at stopping trials involving Berlusconi. The Lodo Alfano was declared unconstitutional by the Italian Constitutional Court in October 2009.

In 2011 the People of Freedom lost both local elections in Milan and Naples, suffered a defeat at the 2011 referendums and a group of parliamentarians, close to Gianfranco Fini, left the party in opposition to Berlusconi's policies and founded the Future and Freedom movement. On 1 June 2011 Angelino Alfano was appointed Political Secretary of the People of Freedom by party President Silvio Berlusconi in order to reorganise and lead it in the next election. He was later elected to that post by the 1 July meeting of the party's National Council.

=== Minister of the Interior ===
On 24 April 2013, the Vice-Secretary of the Democratic Party, Enrico Letta, was invited to form a government by President Giorgio Napolitano, after the resignation of Pier Luigi Bersani following weeks of political deadlock after the 2013 general election. On 27 April Letta formally accepted the task of leading a grand coalition government with support from the centre-left Democratic Party, the centre-right People of Freedom, and the centrist Civic Choice. The government became the first in the history of the Italian Republic to include representatives of all the major candidate-coalitions that had competed in the election. While Berlusconi himself refused to participate in the government, his aide Alfano, as Secretary of the PdL, became Deputy Prime Minister and Minister of the Interior.

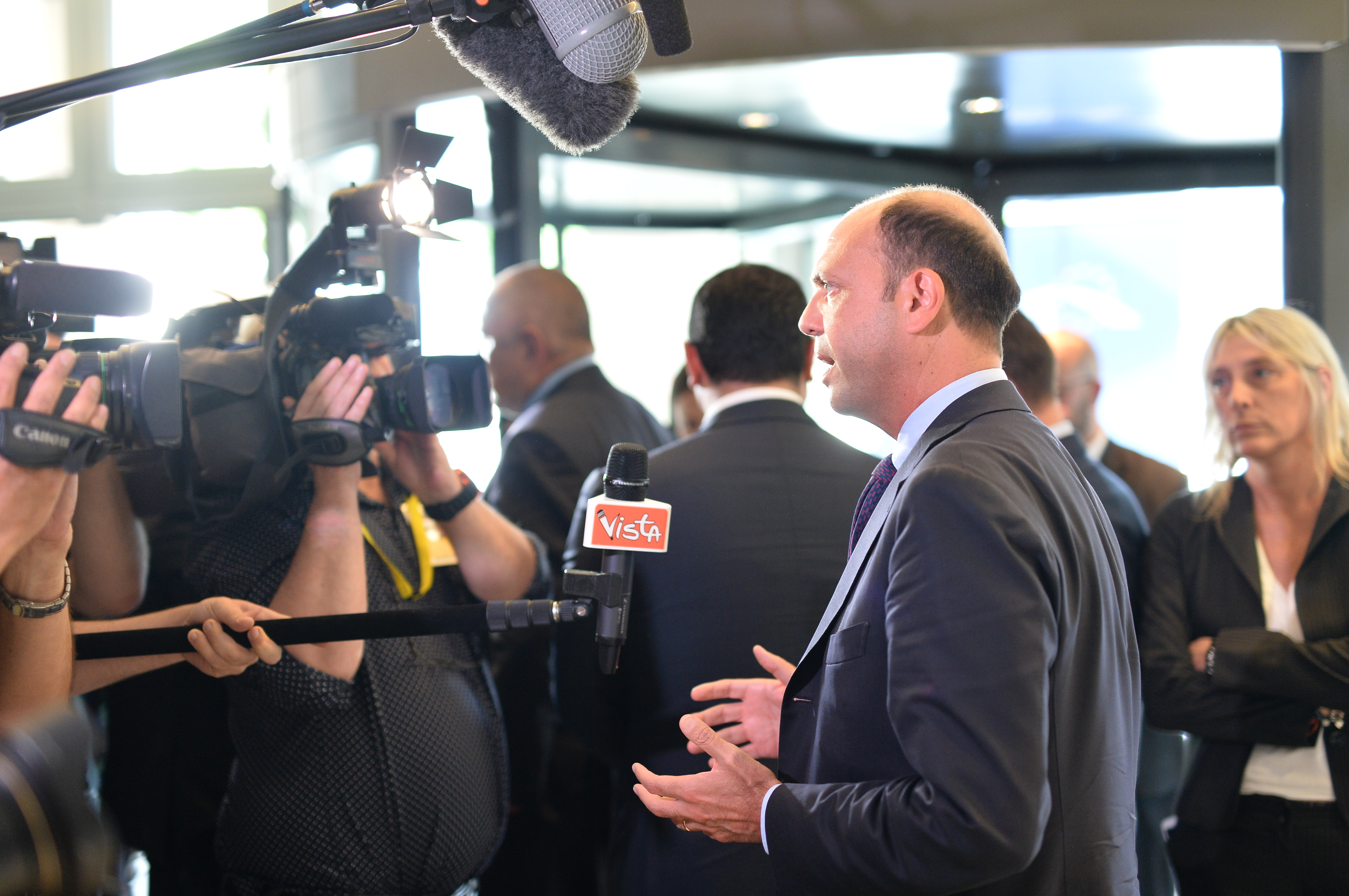
Alfano speaks with journalists during a European Summit in 2014.

On 19 July 2013, the Italian Senate voted a confidence vote on Alfano, promoted by Five Star Movement and Left Ecology Freedom, after the expulsion from Italy of the wife and the daughter of Mukhtar Ablyazov, a Kazakh dissident, approved by Alfano. After the vote Alfano was confirmed as minister.

In November 2013, Alfano broke with his mentor Berlusconi: He and other People of Freedom ministers, known as "doves", were strong supporters of Enrico Letta's government and refused to join the new Forza Italia (FI), founded upon the dissolution of the PdL by Berlusconi. All five PdL ministers, three under-secretaries, 30 senators and 27 deputies immediately joined a new party called New Centre-Right under Alfano's leadership. Most were Christian democrats and many came from the southern regions of Calabria and Sicily.

On 13 February 2014, following his loss in a leadership election against Matteo Renzi, the new Secretary of the Democratic Party, Letta announced he would resign as Prime Minister the following day. On 22 February Renzi was sworn in as Prime Minister and Alfano was confirmed as Interior Minister.

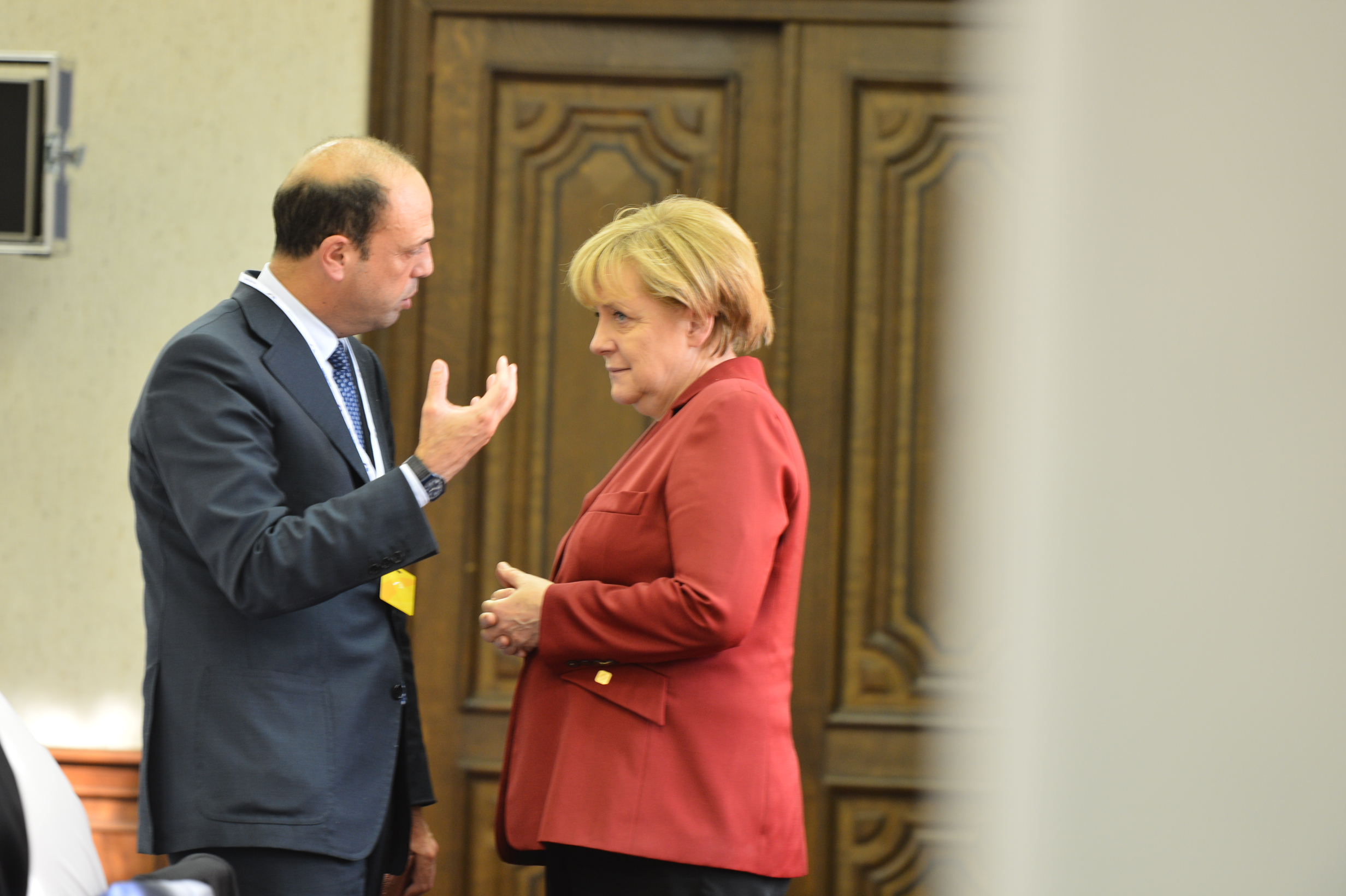
Angelino Alfano with German Chancellor Angela Merkel.

A major problem Alfano has faced, as Interior Minister, is illegal immigration to Italy, which emerged as a result of the Libyan and Syrian civil wars. On 8 August 2014, the Italian Cabinet approved a law-decree contrasting the phenomenon of lawlessness and violence at sporting events and provided for the international protection of migrants. In November 2014, the Italian-run rescue option Operation Mare Nostrum was replaced by Frontex's Operation Triton, due to the refusal by several EU governments to fund it.

On 19 April 2015, a huge shipwreck took place in the Mediterranean Sea, causing the death of more than 700 migrants from North Africa.

In November 2015 six Sicilian Mafia bosses, close to Totò Riina, were arrested for allegedly planning the assassination of Alfano. In a phone-tapped conversations the gang said they wanted Alfano to meet the same fate as John F. Kennedy, the US President assassinated in an open-top car in Dallas in 1963. They also claimed the Sicilian Mafia was behind the murder of the American President; in fact a boss accused both Kennedy and Alfano of rising to power with Mafia support then dismissing the crime group.

=== Minister of Foreign Affairs ===
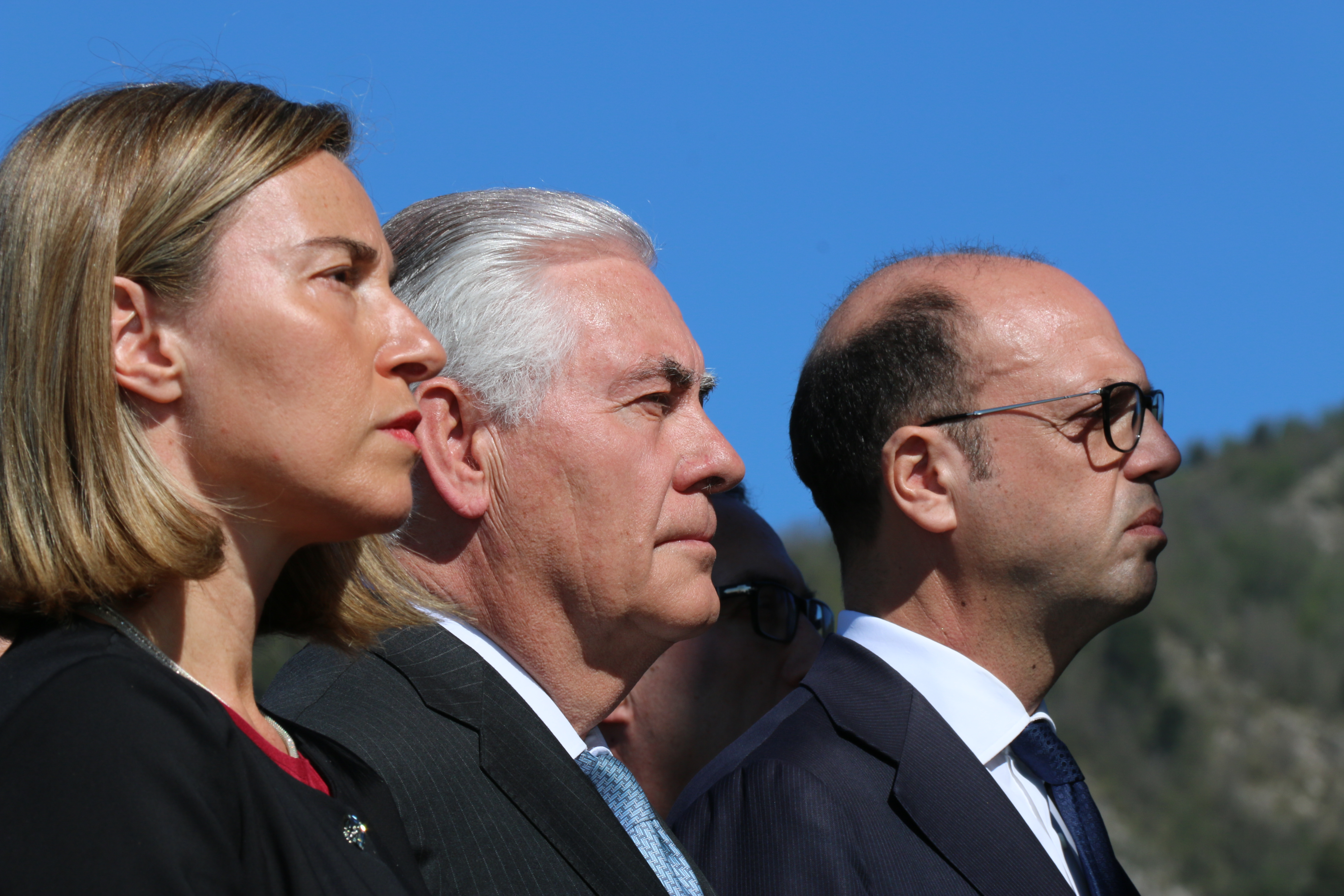
Alfano with U.S. Secretary of State Rex Tillerson and E.U. High Representative Federica Mogherini in Sant'Anna di Stazzema, April 2017.

On 7 December 2016, Prime Minister Matteo Renzi announced his resignation, following the rejection of his proposals to overhaul the Italian Senate in the 2016 Italian constitutional referendum. A few days later, on 11 December 2016, the Foreign Affairs Minister Paolo Gentiloni was asked by President Mattarella to form a new government. On the following day Gentiloni was officially sworn in as the new head of the government.

Angelino Alfano was appointed, by the new Prime Minister and by President Mattarella, new Minister of Foreign Affairs, succeeding Gentiloni.

On 18 March 2017, Alfano, Maurizio Lupi, Roberto Formigoni, Beatrice Lorenzin, Fabrizio Cicchitto and other important members of NCD, announced the dissolution of the New Centre-Right and founded the new party, Popular Alternative. Alfano's subsequent aim was to build a centre-right alliance with the Forza Italia of his former colleague Silvio Berlusconi, but he strongly opposed a coalition with Matteo Salvini's Northern League, a very important partner of the centre-right coalition, and Giorgia Meloni's Brothers of Italy, which he considered too populist. However, in December 2017, Alfano officially announced that he would not participate anymore in the 2018 general election, as his party was deeply split between following the center-left of Renzi, which they were currently supporting in the government, or the center-right of Berlusconi, which had been their original roots. Finally, the remaining bulk of his party under the leadership of his ally Beatrice Lorenzin joined the centre-left coalition as Popular Civic List and won two seats.

== Controversy ==
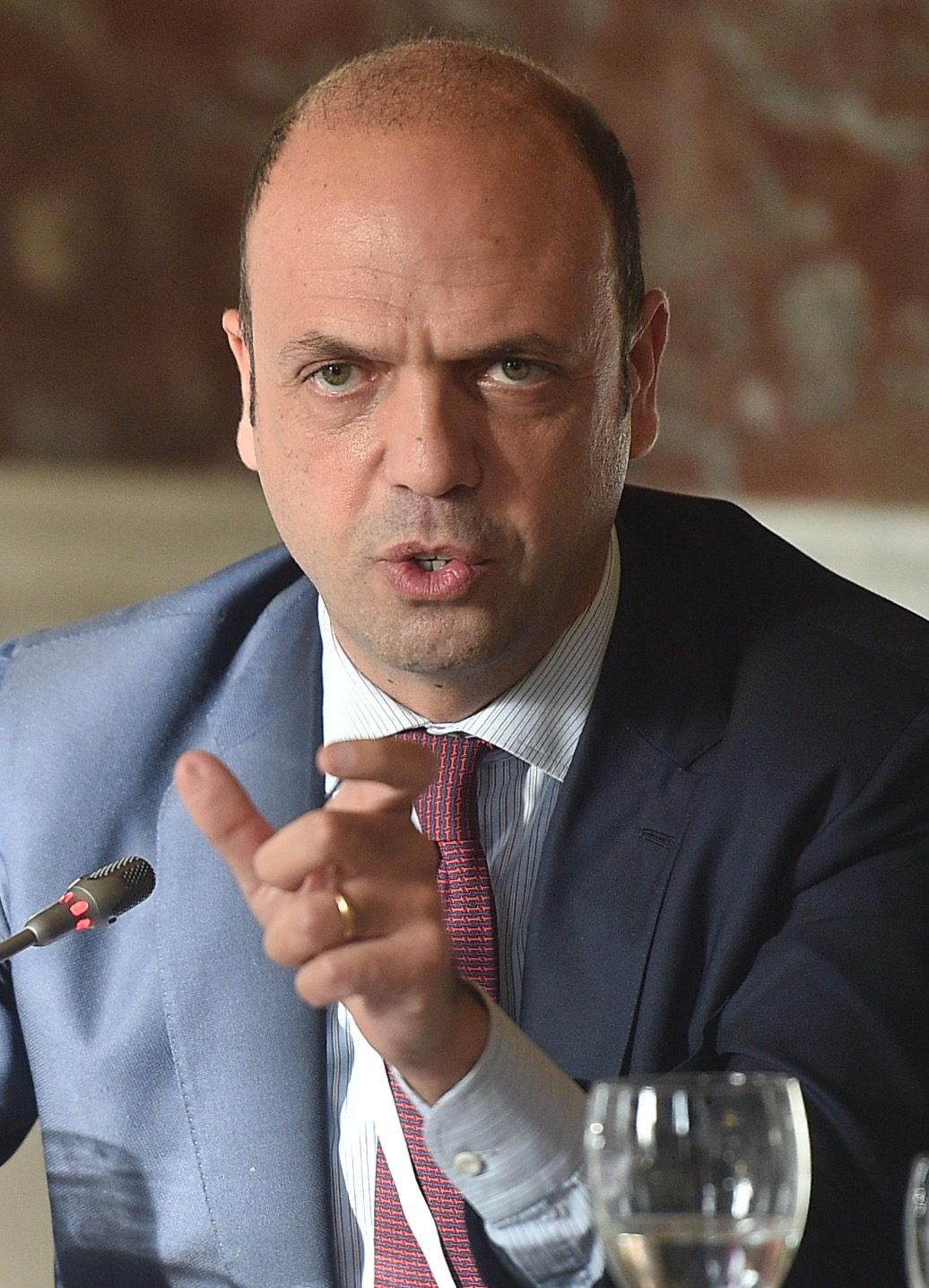
Angelino Alfano in 2015.

In 2002, La Repubblica reported the presence of Alfano at the 1996 wedding of the daughter of Croce Napoli (died 2001), believed by investigators to be the Mafia boss of Palma di Montechiaro. As shown on an amateur video of the party, Alfano, then a deputy of the Sicilian Regional Assembly, was greeted with affection by Croce Napoli. Alfano at first told La Repubblica he had "no memory or recollection of this wedding" and that "I never participated in a wedding of Mafia or of their children, I do not know his wife, Gabriella, and I've never heard of Mr. Croce Napoli who was said to be boss of Palma di Montechiaro." Later he said that he remembered that he was actually at the wedding but had been invited by the groom and did not know the bride and her family.

In 2013, he was threatened with a no-confidence motion, since under his watch as interior minister he expelled back to Kazakhstan the wife and six-year-old daughter of an exiled opponent of Kazakhstan's president, Nursultan Nazarbayev. The expulsion was linked to Italy's commercial interests in oil- and gas-rich Kazakhstan.

== Personal life ==
He is married to Tiziana Miceli, a civil lawyer. They have two sons.

== See also ==
- List of foreign ministers in 2017

Political offices
Preceded by Luigi Scotti	Minister of Justice; 2008–2011	Succeeded by Nitto Francesco Palma
Preceded by Massimo D'Alema	Deputy Prime Minister of Italy; 2013–2014	Succeeded by Matteo Salvini
Preceded by Francesco Rutelli	Deputy Prime Minister of Italy; 2013–2014	Succeeded by Luigi Di Maio
Preceded by Anna Maria Cancellieri	Minister of the Interior; 2013–2016	Succeeded by Marco Minniti
Preceded by Paolo Gentiloni	Minister of Foreign Affairs; 2016–2018	Succeeded by Enzo Moavero Milanesi
Party political offices
New office	Secretary of the People of Freedom; 2011–2013	Party abolished
