= Maurizio Lupi =

Italian politician (born 1959)

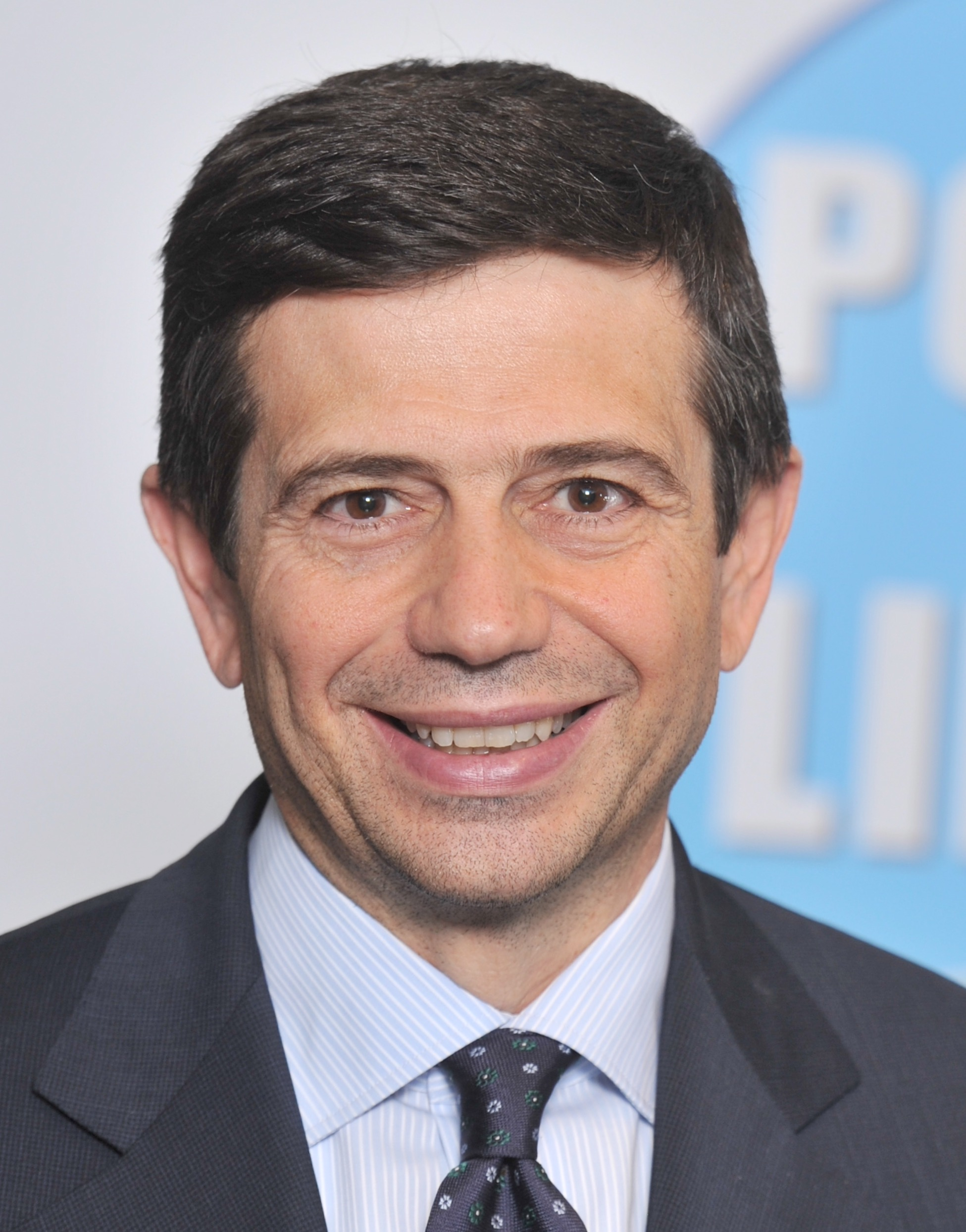
- Lupi in 2012

Minister of Infrastructure and Transport
- In office 28 April 2013 – 20 March 2015
- Prime Minister: Enrico Letta; Matteo Renzi
- Preceded by: Corrado Passera
- Succeeded by: Graziano Delrio

Member of the Chamber of Deputies
- Incumbent
- Assumed office 30 May 2001
- Constituency: Lombardy

Personal details
- Born: Maurizio Enzo Lupi; 3 October 1959 (age 67) Milan, Italy
- Party: NM (since 2022)
- Other political affiliations: DC (before 1994); FI (1994–2009); PdL (2009–2013); NCD (2013–2017); AP (2017); NcI (2017–2023)
- Height: 1.74 m (5 ft 9 in)
- Children: 3
- Education: Università Cattolica del Sacro Cuore

Maurizio Enzo Lupi (born 3 October 1959) is an Italian politician. He served as minister of infrastructure and transport between 28 April 2013 and 20 March 2015.

== Early life and education ==
Lupi was born in Milan, Italy, on 3 October 1959. He has a degree in political science at Università Cattolica del Sacro Cuore.

== Career ==
Lupi served as a member of the municipal council of Milan from 1993 to 1997, and until 1996, he was vice president of the council. He has been a member of the Italian parliament since the XIV legislative period or 2001.

He served as deputy house speaker until 28 April 2013, when he was appointed minister of infrastructure and transport in the Letta cabinet. He replaced Corrado Passera in the post. Lupi joined the New Centre-Right formed by Angelino Alfano in November 2013. Lupi continued to serve as the minister of infrastructure and transport in the cabinet formed by Matteo Renzi in February 2014.

=== Resignation ===
On 19 March 2015, Lupi announced that he would step down as minister the following day due to a scandal involving public works on infrastructure in which his name was cited several times. His tenure as infrastructure and transport minister ended the next day when he resigned from the post, and Prime Minister Matteo Renzi accepted it.

== Personal life and views ==
Lupi is married and has three children.

In the Letta cabinet, Lupi was one of two members of the Catholic movement Communion and Liberation. He is a strong supporter of the TAV project that would connect Italy and France via high-speed rail.
