= Gaetano Quagliariello =

Italian politician (born 1960)

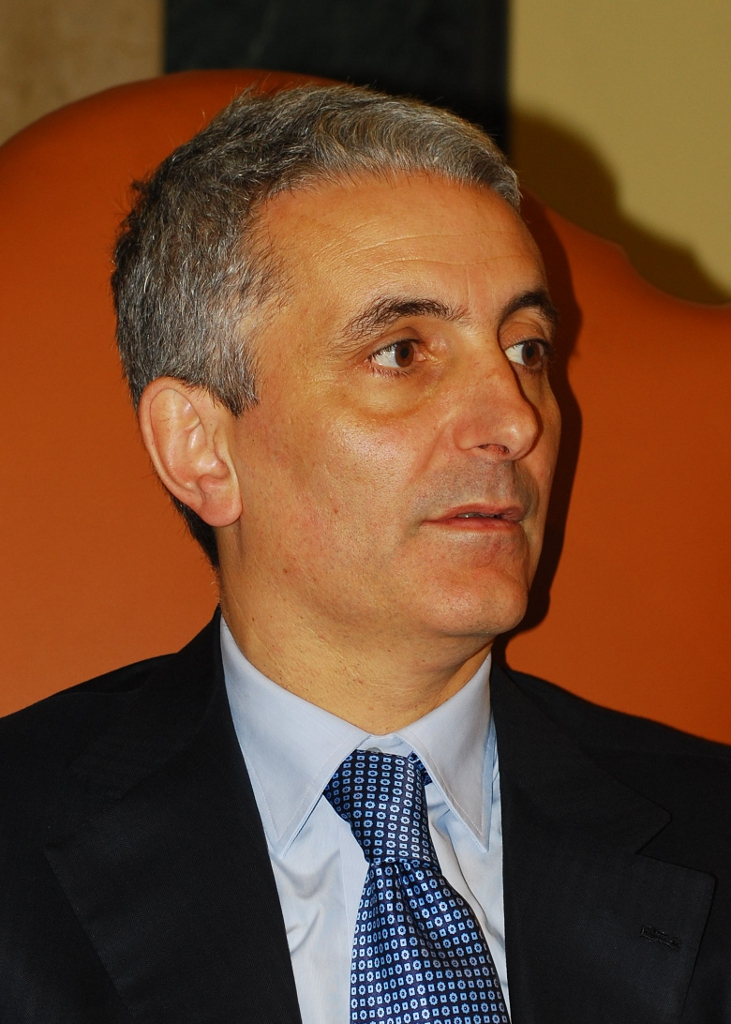

Minister of Constitutional Reforms
- In office 28 April 2013 – 22 February 2014
- Prime Minister: Enrico Letta
- Preceded by: Umberto Bossi
- Succeeded by: Maria Elena Boschi

Member of the Senate
- In office 28 April 2006 – 12 October 2022
- Constituency: Tuscany (2006–2013); Abruzzo (2013–2022)

Personal details
- Born: 23 April 1960 (age 66) Naples, Italy
- Party: IDEA (2015–present)
- Other political affiliations: PRI (until 1975); PR (1975–1982); FI (1994–2009); PdL (2009–2013); NCD (2013–2015)
- Profession: University professor Politician

Gaetano Quagliariello (born 23 April 1960) is an Italian politician, former Minister of Constitutional Reforms and current leader of the Identity and Action (IDEA) party.

== Biography ==
Quagliariello was born in Naples in 1960. While at high school he was a member of the youth wing of the Italian Republican Party. In the 1970s and early 1980s he was involved with the Radical Party led by Marco Pannella.

In 1994 he joined Forza Italia, the conservative party led by the media tycoon Silvio Berlusconi. After the 2006 general election he was elected member of the Chamber of Deputies. When the People of Freedom was formed he joined it and was again re-elected after the general election in 2008.

After the 2013 election he was appointed Minister of Constitutional Reforms in the Grand Coalition led by Enrico Letta. Following the rebirth of Forza Italia, Quagliariello joined the Interior Minister Angelino Alfano in forming a new political party called New Centre-Right (NCD), in support of Letta's government.

On 13 February 2014, following tensions with his left-wing rival, the new Secretary of the Democratic Party Matteo Renzi, Letta announced he would resign as Prime Minister the following day. On 22 February Renzi was sworn in as the new Prime Minister but Quagliariello, unlike the other NCD ministers, was not re-confirmed.
