= Ministry of Education, University and Research =

Government ministry of Italy

Ministry of Education and Merit
- Ministero dell'Istruzione e del Merito; MIM

Agency overview
- Formed: 2001
- Superseding agencies: Ministry of Public Education; Ministry of University and Research
- Jurisdiction: Government of Italy
- Headquarters: Viale Trastevere, 76/a 00153 Rome
- Website: www.miur.gov.it

The Ministry of Education and Merit (in Italian: Ministero dell'Istruzione e del Merito or MIM) is the ministry of the Italian government for the national education system, the Italian universities and research agencies. The current Italian Minister of Public Education is Giuseppe Valditara and the Italian Minister of University and Research is Anna Maria Bernini.

== History ==
In 1988, the Ministry of University and Research was split off from the Ministry of Public Education. In the first Prodi cabinet the two were merged back into the Ministry of Education, University and Scientific and Technological Research, then as the Ministry of Education, University and Research (MIUR) in the second and third Berlusconi cabinets. The two were re-separated in the second Prodi cabinet of 17 May 2006, but then re-merged in the fourth Berlusconi cabinet of 7 May 2008.

In 2019, the ministry drafted a policy combining evaluation of grants to research institutions with a requirement to publish research outputs in open access mode.

== Structure ==
=== National level ===
- Department for ministerial planning and for ministerial management of the education budget, human resources and information
- Department for education
- Department for the universities, higher education establishments in art, music and dance,

The three Departments carry out policies dictated by the Ministry and form the body which directs and programs educational policy.

=== Local level ===
Regional education "uffici", which are autonomous administrative centres, carrying out the instructions of the Departments, directly supporting individual schools, and articulating the policies on the ground.

== Ministers ==
=== Since 2001 ===
Name (Born-Died)	Portrait	Term of Office		Party	Cabinet
Minister of Education, University and Research (MIUR)
Letizia Moratti (1949– )		11 June 2001	17 May 2006	Forza Italia	Berlusconi II; Berlusconi III
Minister of Public Education
Giuseppe Fioroni (1958– )		17 May 2006	8 May 2008	The Daisy; Democratic Party	Prodi II
Minister of University and Research
Fabio Mussi (1948–2026)		17 May 2006	8 May 2008	Democrats of the Left; Democratic Left	Prodi II
Minister of Education, University and Research (MIUR)
Mariastella Gelmini (1973– )		8 May 2008	16 November 2011	The People of Freedom	Berlusconi IV
Francesco Profumo (1953– )		16 November 2011	28 April 2013	Independent	Monti
Maria Chiara Carrozza (1965– )		28 April 2013	22 February 2014	Democratic Party	Letta
Stefania Giannini (1960– )		22 February 2014	12 December 2016	Civic Choice; Democratic Party	Renzi
Valeria Fedeli (1949–2026)		12 December 2016	1 June 2018	Democratic Party	Gentiloni
Marco Bussetti (1962– )		1 June 2018	5 September 2019	Lega Nord	Conte I
Lorenzo Fioramonti (1977– )		5 September 2019	25 December 2019	Five Star Movement	Conte II
Minister of Public Education
Lucia Azzolina (1982– )		10 January 2020	13 February 2021	Five Star Movement	Conte II
Patrizio Bianchi (1952– )		13 February 2021	22 October 2022	Independent	Draghi
Giuseppe Valditara (1961– )		22 October 2022	Incumbent	League	Meloni
Minister of University and Research
Gaetano Manfredi (1964– )		10 January 2020	13 February 2021	Independent	Conte II
Maria Cristina Messa (1961– )		13 February 2021	22 October 2022	Independent	Draghi
Anna Maria Bernini (1965– )		22 October 2022	Incumbent	Forza Italia	Meloni

== See also ==
- Ministry of University and Research
- Ministry of Public Education (Italy)
