= Renzi government =

63rd government of the Italian Republic

- 63rd Cabinet of Italy

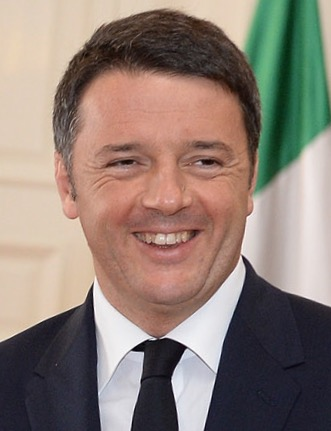
- Date formed: 22 February 2014
- Date dissolved: 12 December 2016 (1,025 days)

People and organisations
- Head of state: Giorgio Napolitano; Sergio Mattarella
- Head of government: Matteo Renzi
- No. of ministers: 17 (incl. Prime Minister)
- Ministers removed: 4 resigned
- Total no. of members: 21 (incl. Prime Minister)
- Member parties: PD, NCD, UdC, SC
- Status in legislature: Majority (coalition)
- Opposition parties: M5S, FI, LN, SEL, FdI

History
- Legislature term: XVII Legislature (2013–2018)
- Predecessor: Letta government
- Successor: Gentiloni government

The Renzi government was the 63rd government of the Italian Republic, in office from February 2014 to December 2016. It was led by Matteo Renzi, secretary and leader of the centre-left Democratic Party (PD). The government was made of members of the PD together with the New Centre-Right (NCD), the Union of the Centre (UdC), Civic Choice (SC), the Populars for Italy (PpI, until June 2015), Solidary Democracy (DemoS since July 2014), the Italian Socialist Party (PSI), Democratic Centre (CD, since October 2015), and non-party independents.

At its formation, the Renzi government was the youngest government of Italy to date, with an average age of forty-seven, and the youngest-ever prime minister. It was also the first Italian government in which the number of female ministers was equal to the number of male ministers, not including the prime minister; that later changed, as eventually three female ministers resigned, each replaced by a male minister. On 19 April 2016, the Senate rejected two motions of no confidence against the government following the Tempa Rossa scandal; the first one (entered by the Five Star Movement) was defeated with a 96–183 votes, while the second one (entered by Forza Italia, Northern League, and Conservative and Reformists) was defeated with a 93–180 vote.

== History ==
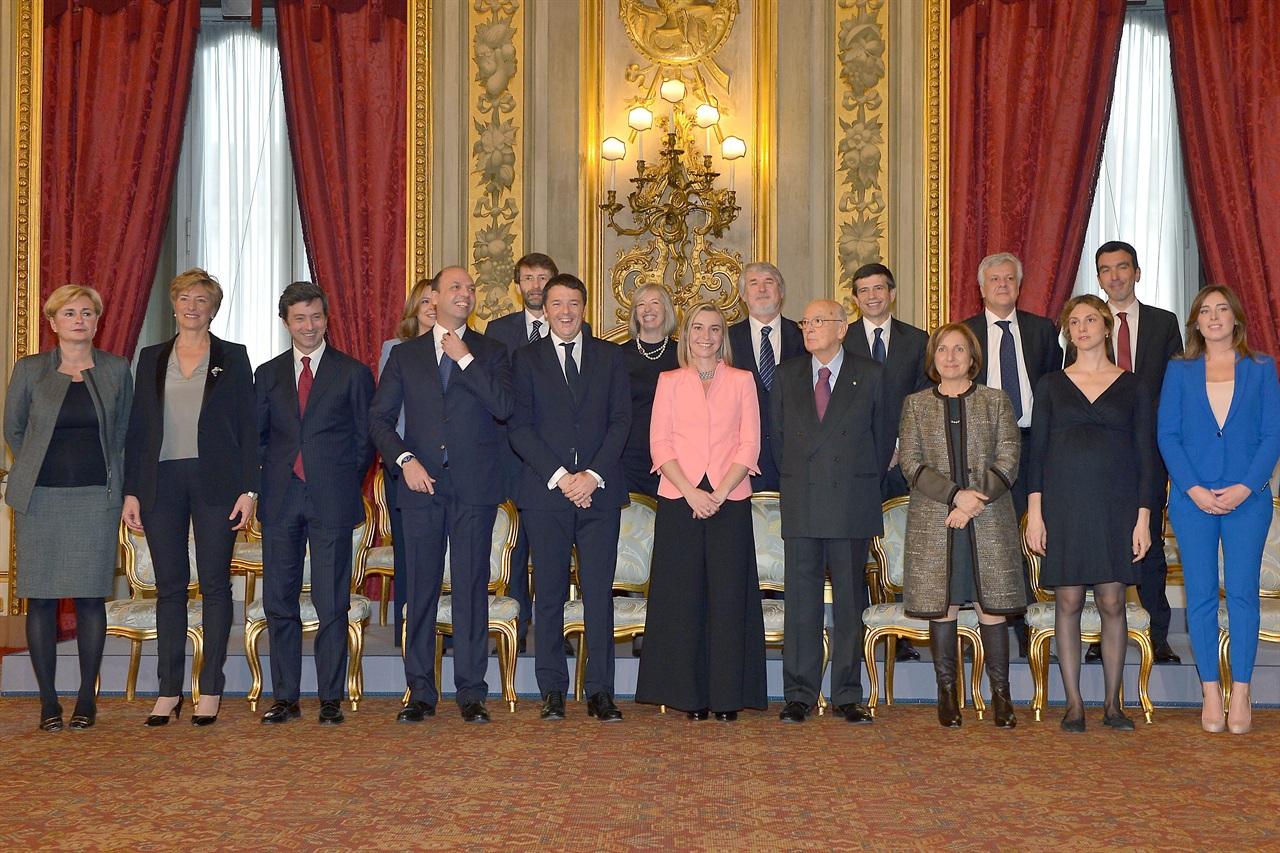
Renzi's government during the oath.

At a meeting on 13 February 2014, following tensions between Prime Minister Enrico Letta and PD Secretary Matteo Renzi, the Democratic Party leadership voted heavily in favour of Renzi's call for "a new government, a new phase and a radical programme of reform". Minutes after the Party backed the Renzi proposal by 136 votes to 16, with two abstentions, Palazzo Chigi – the official residence of the Prime Minister – announced that Letta would travel to the Quirinale the following day to tender his resignation to President Giorgio Napolitano.

In an earlier speech, Renzi had paid tribute to Letta, saying that he did not intend to put him "on trial". But, without directly proposing himself as the next Prime Minister, he said the Eurozone's third-largest economy urgently needed "a new phase" and "radical programme" to push through badly needed reforms. The motion he put forward made clear "the necessity and urgency of opening a new phase with a new executive". Speaking privately to party leaders, Renzi said that Italy was "at a crossroads" and faced either holding fresh elections or a new government without a return to the polls. On 14 February, President Napolitano accepted Letta's resignation from the office of Prime Minister.

Following Letta's resignation, Renzi formally received the task of forming a new government from President Napolitano on 17 February. Renzi held several days of talks with party leaders, all of which he broadcast live on the internet, before unveiling his government on 21 February, which contained members of his Democratic Party, the New Centre-Right, the Union of the Centre and Civic Choice. His government became Italy's youngest government to date, with an average age of 47. It was also the first in which the number of female ministers was equal to the number of male ministers, excluding the Prime Minister.

The following day Renzi was formally sworn in as prime minister, becoming the youngest prime minister in the history of Italy. His rise to become prime minister was widely seen as a sign of much-needed generational change, and at the time he took office he enjoyed by far the highest approval rating of any politician in the country. On 25 February Renzi won a vote of confidence in the Italian Parliament, with 169 votes in the Senate and 378 in the Chamber of Deputies. On 20 March, Prime Minister Renzi became ad interim Minister of Infrastructure and Transport after the resignation of Maurizio Lupi, due to a corruption scandal involving public works on infrastructure, in which his name was cited several times. Renzi held the office until 2 April, when Graziano Delrio was appointed as the new minister.

== Investiture votes ==
24–25 February 2014 Investiture votes for Renzi Cabinet
House of Parliament	Vote	Parties	Votes
Senate of the Republic (Voting: 308 (Note: Absent (7): FI (2), M5S (1), PI (1), Others (3) On institutional leave (4): LN (1), Aut (1), Others (2) President (1)) of 320, Majority: 155)	Yes	PD (107), NCD (31), PSI-SVP (11), PI (11), SC (8), GAL–UDC (1)	169 / 308
Senate of the Republic (Voting: 308 of 320, Majority: 155)	No	FI (58), M5S (49), LN (14), GAL–UDC (10), Others (8)	139 / 308
Senate of the Republic (Voting: 308 of 320, Majority: 155)	Abstention	None	0 / 308
Chamber of Deputies (Voting: 599 (Note: Absent (27): M5S (6), FI (6), CeI (5), PD (3), FdI (2), DemoS–CD (2), LN (1), SI–SEL–P (1), Others (1) On institutional leave (3): M5S (2), SI–SEL–P (1)) of 629, Majority: 300)	Yes	PD (290), NCD (29), SC (22), DemoS–CD (17), LN (1), Others (19)	378 / 599
Chamber of Deputies (Voting: 599 of 629, Majority: 300)	No	M5S (98), FI (61), SEL (34), LN (18), FdI (7), Others (2)	220 / 599
Chamber of Deputies (Voting: 599 of 629, Majority: 300)	Abstention	Others (1)	1 / 599

== Domestic policy ==
=== Nazareno Pact ===
On 18 January 2014, four days before becoming prime minister, Matteo Renzi signed a political agreement (called Patto del Nazareno) with Silvio Berlusconi, in order to implement reforms such as the new electoral law and the transformation of the Senate of the Republic into the Chamber of Autonomies, making parliament an imperfect bicameral system.

=== Jobs Act ===
On economic matters, the government committed to improving the labor market flexibility through the Jobs Act, which consisted of various reforms. These included a modification of Workers' Statue's Article 18, limiting cases of reinstatement following unfair dismissal (restricting it solely to cases of discrimination) and replacing it with financial compensation; the introduction of Naspi ("new social insurance benefit for employment"), which, in case of failure to appear to the employment centers, is reduced and subsequently revoked; reduction in the duration of unemployment benefits from four to two years (three for specific types of contracts), accompanied by higher contribution requirements for the company utilizing it; incentives for hiring workers with disabilities, and immediate closure of the business, not in the event of undeclared work anymore, but only if, once discovered, the worker is not formally hired.

=== Civil unions ===
In October 2014, Renzi announced his intention to introduce a civil union law exclusively for same-sex couples, modeled on the German one, that would not be fully equivalent to marriage and would exclude the possibility of adoption (with the exception of stepchild adoption), and assisted reproduction. The NCD, in addition to the things that were already excluded from the proposal, also opposed stepchild adoption. The government did not present its own text, and the bill, proposed on 6 October 2015, was primarily drafted by MP Monica Cirinnà, which was rapporteur for unified texts on various bills concerning civil unions. The "Cirinnà Law", from which the duty of fidelity and stepchild adoption were removed, was finally approved by the Senate on 25 February 2016, and by the Chamber of Deputies on 11 May.

=== Electoral law ===
Alongside the attempt to modify the Constitution, the government proposed a new electoral law (also with the support of Forza Italia and Berlusconi), called Italicum, to regulate elections for the Chamber of Deputies (given that the Senate would have become an indirect-elected body under the constitutional reforms awaiting approval). The law, finally approved on 4 May 2015, was based on proportional representation (with a 3% electoral threshold), featuring 100 multi-member constituencies with open lists and a majority bonus for any party exceeding 40% of the vote; if no party surpassed the 40%, a runoff election would have been held between the two largest parties to determine which would secure the majority bonus.

=== RAI Reform ===
The Chamber, on 21 October 2025 (and then the Senate on 22 December) approved the reform of RAI, thanks to which: the Ministry of the Economy selects the CEO (who will decide on appointments of directors of television networks, channels, and news outlets, and on contracts worth up to 10 million euros); Rai will have preferential access when it comes to the acquisition, production, or co-production of television programs; the RAI Board of Directors has been restructured, reducing the number of its members from 9 (with 7 elected by the parliamentary Supervisory Commission, with 4 from majority and 3 to the opposition, and 2, including the president, by the Ministry of the Economy) to 7 (2 chosen by the Chamber of Deputies, 2 by the Senate, 2 by the government, and 1 by the assembly of RAI employees). Furthermore, with the inclusion of the RAI license fee in electricity bills, it was estimated that this would recover 420 million euros per year (against approximately 600 million in unpaid fees).

=== 2016 constitutional referendum ===
On March 4, 2026, Renzi's government held a constitutional referendum where voters were asked whether they approved a constitutional law that would have modified many aspects of the Constitution, in particular 47 articles (initially 49) out of 139:

- The Senate would have become representative of the regions and autonomous provinces, not subject to dissolution, whose vote would have been required only for specific matters (though it could have been overridden by a second vote in the Chamber), and without the authority to grant a vote of confidence to the government or pass motions of no confidence against it;
- A "Statute of the Oppositions" in parliament would have been created;
- The number of signatures required to submit a popular legislative proposal would have increased from 50,000 to 150,000;
- If 800,000 signatures were collected for a referendum, the quorum would have not been 50% of the population, but rather half of the number of people who voted in the last election; furthermore, referendums initiated by citizens to propose new laws would have been introduced;
- The Government could have asked the Chamber to designate a bill as a priority, in order to reach a final vote within a maximum of 70 days;
- Regarding the election of the President of the Republic, who is chosen by two-thirds of Parliament, the option to elect them by an absolute majority after the third ballot would have been eliminated; instead, it would have been needed three-fifths of the votes of the entire assembly (from the fourth ballot onwards), or three-fifths of those voting from the seventh ballot onwards.
- Abolition of "concurrent competences" between the state and the regions, in favor of the state, excluding the "regioni a statuto speciale" (Sicily, Sardinia, Aosta Valley, Trentino-Alto Adige/Südtirol and Friuli-Venezia Giulia);
- The 5 judges (out of 15) of the High Council of the Judiciary elected by Parliament would be divided into 3 elected by the Chamber and 2 by the Senate.
- The National Council for Economics and Labour (CNEL) and the provinces would have been abolished.

The "No" vote prevailed with 59%, prompting Renzi to resign as prime minister.

== Criticism and controversies ==
=== Jobs Act ===
In the years following its implementation, the Constitutional Court struck down certain parts of the Jobs Act as unconstitutional, such as: the fact that the compensation owed to the worker in case of unfair dismissal depended on how much time they worked in that company, including cases of formal or procedural defects; the fact that reinstatement applies only to workers whose case is "expressly" (word removed) provided for by law; the fact that a worker could be dismissed for objective economic reasons based on a material fact that did not actually exist; and the limit of six months' pay due to a unfairly dismissed worker.

== Party breakdown ==
=== Beginning of term ===
==== Ministers ====
- Democratic Party
10
- New Centre-Right
3
- Civic Choice
1
- Union of the Centre
1
- Independents
2

==== Ministers and other members ====
- Democratic Party (PD): Prime minister, 8 ministers, 4 deputy ministers, 21 undersecretaries
- New Centre-Right (NCD): 3 ministers, 2 deputy ministers, 7 undersecretaries
- Civic Choice (SC): 1 minister, 1 deputy minister, 3 undersecretaries
- Union of the Centre (UdC): 1 minister
- Populars for Italy (PpI): 1 deputy minister, 3 undersecretaries
- Italian Socialist Party (PSI): 1 deputy minister
- Independents: 3 ministers, 5 undersecretaries

=== End of term ===
==== Ministers ====
- Democratic Party
11
- New Centre-Right
3
- Union of the Centre
1
- Independents
2

==== Ministers and other members ====
- Democratic Party (PD): Prime minister, 9 ministers, 3 deputy ministers, 23 undersecretaries
- New Centre-Right (NCD): 3 ministers, 1 deputy minister, 9 undersecretaries
- Union of the Centre (UdC): 1 minister
- Solidary Democracy (DemoS): 2 deputy ministers
- Civic Choice (SC): 1 deputy minister
- Italian Socialist Party (PSI): 1 deputy minister
- Democratic Centre (CD): 1 undersecretary
- Civics and Innovators (CI): 1 undersecretary
- Independents: 3 ministers, 1 deputy minister, 4 undersecretaries

== Geographical breakdown ==
=== Beginning of term ===
- Northern Italy: 8 ministers
  - Emilia-Romagna: 4 ministers
  - Lombardy: 2 ministers
  - Liguria: 2 ministers
- Central Italy: 7 ministers (incl. Renzi)
  - Lazio: 4 ministers
  - Tuscany: 3 ministers
- Southern and Insular Italy: 2 ministers
  - Sicily: 1 minister
  - Calabria: 1 minister

=== Final breakdown ===
- Northern Italy: 8 ministers
  - Emilia-Romagna: 4 ministers
  - Liguria: 2 ministers
  - Piedmont: 1 minister
  - Lombardy: 1 minister
- Central Italy: 8 ministers (incl. Renzi)
  - Lazio: 5 ministers
  - Tuscany: 3 ministers
- Southern and Insular Italy: 1 minister
  - Sicily: 1 minister

== Council of Ministers ==
Office	Name	Party	Term
Prime Minister	Matteo Renzi	PD	2014–2016
Minister of Foreign Affairs	Federica Mogherini	PD	2014
Minister of Foreign Affairs	Paolo Gentiloni	PD	2014–2016
Minister of the Interior	Angelino Alfano	NCD	2014–2016
Minister of Justice	Andrea Orlando	PD	2014–2016
Minister of Defence	Roberta Pinotti	PD	2014–2016
Minister of Economy and Finance	Pier Carlo Padoan	Ind.	2014–2016
Minister of Economic Development	Federica Guidi	Ind.	2014–2016
Minister of Economic Development	Matteo Renzi (ad interim)	PD	2016
Minister of Economic Development	Carlo Calenda	Ind.	2016
Minister of Infrastructure and Transport	Maurizio Lupi	NCD	2014–2015
Minister of Infrastructure and Transport	Matteo Renzi (ad interim)	PD	2015
Minister of Infrastructure and Transport	Graziano Delrio	PD	2015–2016
Minister of Agricultural, Food and Forestry Policies	Maurizio Martina	PD	2014–2016
Minister of the Environment	Gian Luca Galletti	UDC / CpI	2014–2016
Minister of Labour and Social Policies	Giuliano Poletti	Ind.	2014–2016
Minister of Education, University and Research	Stefania Giannini	SC / PD	2014–2016
Minister of Culture and Tourism	Dario Franceschini	PD	2014–2016
Minister of Health	Beatrice Lorenzin	NCD	2014–2016
Minister of Constitutional Reforms and Parliamentary Relations	Maria Elena Boschi	PD	2014–2016
Minister of Public Administration	Marianna Madia	PD	2014–2016
Minister of Regional Affairs	Maria Carmela Lanzetta	PD	2014–2015
Minister of Regional Affairs	Enrico Costa	NCD	2015–2016
Secretary of the Council of Ministers	Graziano Delrio	PD	2014–2015
Secretary of the Council of Ministers	Claudio De Vincenti	PD	2015–2016

== Composition ==
Office	Portrait	Name	Term of office	Party
Prime Minister		Matteo Renzi	22 February 2014 – 12 December 2016	Democratic Party
Prime Minister	Undersecretaries: Graziano Delrio (PD) – Delegated to the Territorial Cohesion Policies (until 2 April 2015); Claudio De Vincenti (PD) – Delegated to the Territorial Cohesion Policies (since 10 April 2015); Luca Lotti (PD) – Delegated to Information, Government Communication and Publishing, Planning, Preparation, and Organization of the Interventions Needed for the Celebration of the Centennial of the First World War to the Sponsorisation and Implementation of Initiatives for the Celebration of the 70th anniversary of the Resistance and the Liberation War; Sandro Gozi (PD) – Delegated to the European Affairs, and to the Coordination of the Activities Involved in the Semester of Italian Presidency of the Council of the European Union, Together with the Minister of Foreign Affairs.; Marco Minniti (PD) – Delegated to the Authority for the Security of the Republic; Tommaso Nannicini (PD) – Delegated to the Coordination of Public Policies in the Economic, Social and Scientific Research Fields (since 29 January 2016)			
Minister of Foreign Affairs		Federica Mogherini	22 February 2014 – 31 October 2014 (Note: Mogherini was appointed High Representative of the Union for Foreign Affairs and Security Policy in the Juncker Commission.)	Democratic Party
Minister of Foreign Affairs		Paolo Gentiloni	31 October 2014 – 12 December 2016	Democratic Party
Minister of Foreign Affairs	Deputy Minister: Mario Giro (PpI; after 4 July 2014: DemoS); Undersecretaries: Vincenzo Amendola (PD); Benedetto Della Vedova (SC; after 6 February 2015: Ind.)			
Minister of the Interior		Angelino Alfano	22 February 2014 – 12 December 2016	New Centre-Right
Minister of the Interior	Deputy Minister: Filippo Bubbico (PD); Undersecretaries: Gianpiero Bocci (PD); Domenico Manzione (Ind.)			
Minister of Justice		Andrea Orlando	22 February 2014 – 12 December 2016	Democratic Party
Minister of Justice	Undersecretaries: Federica Chiavaroli (NCD); Cosimo Ferri (PD) (since 29 January 2016); Gennaro Migliore (PD) (since 29 January 2016)			
Minister of Defence		Roberta Pinotti	22 February 2014 – 12 December 2016	Democratic Party
Minister of Defence	Undersecretaries: Gioacchino Alfano (NCD); Domenico Rossi (CD)			
Minister of Economy and Finance		Pier Carlo Padoan	22 February 2014 – 12 December 2016	Independent
Minister of Economy and Finance	Deputy Ministers: Luigi Casero (NCD); Enrico Morando (PD); Enrico Zanetti (SC) (since 29 January 2016); Undersecretaries: Giovanni Legnini (PD) (until 25 September 2014); Paola De Micheli (PD) (since 10 November 2014)			
Minister of Economic Development		Federica Guidi	22 February 2014 – 5 April 2016 (Note: Federica Guidi resigned amid allegations that she had sought to shape 2015 budget law to favour an oil project from which her partner, who was inquired, stood to benefit financially.)	Independent
Minister of Economic Development	Matteo Renzi (Acting)		5 April 2016 – 10 May 2016	Democratic Party
Minister of Economic Development		Carlo Calenda	10 May 2016 – 12 December 2016	Independent
Minister of Economic Development	Deputy Ministers: Carlo Calenda (Ind.) (until 20 March 2016); Claudio De Vincenti (PD) (until 10 April 2015); Teresa Bellanova (PD) (since 29 January 2016); Undersecretaries: Antonello Giacomelli (PD); Simona Vicari (NCD) (until 29 January 2016); Antonio Gentile (NCD) (since 29 January 2016); Ivan Scalfarotto (PD) (since 8 April 2016)			
Minister of Agricultural, Food and Forestry Policies		Maurizio Martina	22 February 2014 – 12 December 2016	Democratic Party
Minister of Agricultural, Food and Forestry Policies	Deputy Minister: Andrea Olivero (PpI; after 4 July 2014: DemoS); Undersecretary: Giuseppe Castiglione (NCD)			
Minister of the Environment		Gian Luca Galletti	22 February 2014 – 12 December 2016	Union of the Centre
Minister of the Environment	Undersecretaries: Barbara Degani (NCD); Silvia Velo (PD)			
Minister of Infrastructure and Transport		Maurizio Lupi	22 February 2014 – 20 March 2015 (Note: Lupi resigned following a corruption scandal involving public works on infrastructure, in which his name was cited several times.)	New Centre-Right
Minister of Infrastructure and Transport	Matteo Renzi (Acting)		20 March 2015 – 2 April 2015	Democratic Party
Minister of Infrastructure and Transport		Graziano Delrio	2 April 2015 – 12 December 2016	Democratic Party
Minister of Infrastructure and Transport	Deputy Minister: Riccardo Nencini (PSI); Undersecretaries: Umberto Del Basso De Caro (PD); Antonio Gentile (NCD) (until 10 March 2014); Simona Vicari (NCD) (since 29 January 2016)			
Minister of Labour and Social Policies		Giuliano Poletti	22 February 2014 – 12 December 2016	Independent
Minister of Labour and Social Policies	Undersecretaries: Franca Biondelli (PD); Luigi Bobba (PD); Massimo Cassano (NCD); Teresa Bellanova (PD) (until 29 January 2016)			
Minister of Education, University and Research		Stefania Giannini	22 February 2014 – 12 December 2016	Civic Choice; Before 5 February 2015
Minister of Education, University and Research		Stefania Giannini	22 February 2014 – 12 December 2016	Democratic Party; After 5 February 2015
Minister of Education, University and Research	Undersecretaries: Gabriele Toccafondi (NCD); Angela D'Onghia (Ind.); Roberto Reggi (PD) (until 19 September 2014); Davide Faraone (PD) (since 10 November 2014)			
Minister of Cultural Heritage and Activities and Tourism		Dario Franceschini	22 February 2014 – 12 December 2016	Democratic Party
Minister of Cultural Heritage and Activities and Tourism	Undersecretaries: Ilaria Borletti Buitoni (PD); Francesca Barracciu (PD) (until 21 October 2015); Dorina Bianchi (NCD) (since 29 January 2016); Antimo Cesaro (SC) (since 29 January 2016)			
Minister of Health		Beatrice Lorenzin	22 February 2014 – 12 December 2016	New Centre-Right
Minister of Health	Undersecretary: Vito De Filippo (PD)			
Minister for Constitutional Reforms and Parliamentary Relations (without portfolio)		Maria Elena Boschi	22 February 2014 – 12 December 2016	Democratic Party
Minister for Constitutional Reforms and Parliamentary Relations (without portfolio)	Undersecretaries: Sesa Amici (PD); Luciano Pizzetti (PD); Ivan Scalfarotto (PD) (until 8 April 2016)			
Minister of Public Administration (without portfolio)		Marianna Madia	22 February 2014 – 12 December 2016	Democratic Party
Minister of Public Administration (without portfolio)	Undersecretary: Angelo Rughetti (PD)			
Minister of Regional Affairs and Autonomies (without portfolio)		Maria Carmela Lanzetta	22 February 2014 – 26 January 2015 (Note: Lanzetta accepted the appointment as regional assessor in the cabinet of Mario Oliverio, President of Calabria.)	Democratic Party
Minister of Regional Affairs and Autonomies (without portfolio)	Matteo Renzi (Acting)		26 January 2015 – 29 January 2016	Democratic Party
Minister of Regional Affairs and Autonomies (without portfolio)		Enrico Costa	29 January 2016 – 12 December 2016	New Centre-Right
Minister of Regional Affairs and Autonomies (without portfolio)	Undersecretary: Gianclaudio Bressa (PD)			
Secretary of the Council of Ministers		Graziano Delrio	22 February 2014 – 2 April 2015 (Note: Delrio sworn in as Minister of Infrastructure and Transport)	Democratic Party
Secretary of the Council of Ministers		Claudio De Vincenti	10 April 2015 – 12 December 2016	Democratic Party

== Chronology ==
=== February 2014 ===
On 14 February 2014, the Italian Prime Minister Enrico Letta, taking note of the approval by a large majority by the Central Committee of the Democratic Party of a proposal by the Democratic Party Secretary Renzi to give life to a new government, tendered his irrevocable resignation to the President of the Italian Republic Giorgio Napolitano, who accepted it and gave life immediately to consultations with speakers of the House of Deputies and of the Senate, as well as with delegations of MPs for each political party. The Northern League Party and the Five Star Movement decide not to take part in such consultations.

On 17 February 2014, the President of the Republic assigned the task of forming a new government to the Secretary of the Democratic Party Matteo Renzi, who reserved the right to accept, also informing the Speakers of both Houses. On 18 February 2014 and 19 February 2014 the Prime Minister held consultations with the parliamentary groups of both Houses of Parliament. On 21 February 2014, Matteo Renzi went to the president of the Republic and communicated his decision to become prime minister, presenting a list of 16 ministers.

On 22 February 2014, Matteo Renzi and 15 ministers took the oath before the president of the Republic at the Quirinale Palace. After the handover with the former Prime Minister Enrico Letta, Renzi presided over the first government meeting, in which the Ministers without portfolio were assigned their briefs and Graziano Delrio was appointed Under-Secretary of State at the Prime Minister's Office, as well as Cabinet Secretary.

On 24 February 2014, Prime Minister Renzi presented his Government's program in the Senate and, after almost 11 hours of debate, his government obtained the Senate's vote of confidence, with 169 voting in favor and 139 against. On 25 February 2014, the government also obtained the vote of confidence vote of the House of Deputies, with 378 votes in favour, 220 against and 1 abstention.

On 28 February 2014, the Italian government appointed forty four under-secretaries, who in the evening took the oath before Prime Minister Matteo Renzi.

=== March 2014 ===
On 3 March 2014, after several days of controversy, the new Under Secretary for Infrastructures and Transports, Antonio Gentile tendered his resignation.

On 12 March 2014, after two days of voting, the Chamber of Deputies approved in first reading the new electoral law Italicum with 365 votes in favour, 156 against and 40 abstentions. A number of controversies surrounded the failure to introduce preferential votes favouring gender equality.

On 12 March 2014, the Italian government issued a law- decree on fixed-term contracts, called the Poletti Decree, as well as a Bill proposing a reform on the Italian labor market called "Jobs Act" A reduction in the tax burden of about €80 was announced for those earning less than 1500 Euros per month.

On 26 March 2014, despite the controversy raised by several parties belonging to the majority coalition, the government won a confidence vote in the Senate on the Delrio Bill reforming the provinces, with 160 voting in favour and 133 against. Subsequently, the Chamber of Deputies approved the Bill on 3 April 2014.

=== April 2014 ===
On 18 April 2014, the Italian government approved a law-decree which provided for the reduction of Income Tax for employees and assimilated workers earning up to €24,000 gross per year. The net monthly salary was foreseen to increase by €80, through a tax credit from the month of May 2014.

On 30 April 2014, Matteo Renzi, together with the Minister for the Public Administration Marianna Madia, presented the guidelines for the reform of the Public Administration, subsequently approved by the government on 13 June 2014.

=== May 2014 ===
On 6 May 2014, the Constitutional Affairs Committee of the Senate approved the Government's Bill on the reform of the Italian Senate.

On 21 May 2014, an agreement was signed between the Government, Sardinia Region and the Qatar Foundation to bring €1 billion investment and thousands of jobs to Sardinia.

On 22 May 2014, the Italian government of Ministers approved the Law-decree on culture for the preservation of the Italian historic, artistic and cultural heritage.

On 25 May 2014, the Democratic Party, which was the main supporter of the government and was also the party of the Prime Minister Matteo Renzi, won the 2014 European elections with 40.81% of the votes.

=== August 2014 ===
On 1 August 2014, the Italian Prime Minister Matteo Renzi explained in a press conference the guidelines of Law-decree called "Sblocca Italia" or "Unlock Italy", which, in the intentions of the Government, is to facilitate the implementation of major projects, civil works and infrastructure that are currently suspended, as well as achieve further administrative simplification. A month of public consultations would take place in relation to such guidelines.

On 8 August 2014, the Italian government approved a law-decree contrasting the phenomenon of lawlessness and violence at sporting events and provided for the international protection of migrants.

On 8 August 2014, the Senate approved the constitutional reform proposed by the government with 183 votes in favour, and 4 abstentions.

On 8 August 2014, the two Houses of Parliament approved of the decrees on Competitiveness, Public Administration and Prisons, which become law.

On 29 August 2014, the Italian government approved the "Unblock Italy" Law-Decree and Justice Reform, dividing it into a Law-Decree for the disposal of the backlog in civil proceedings, and Law-Decrees relating to the fight against organized crime and illegal assets, the civil liability of judges, the efficiency of civil trials, as well as a comprehensive reform of the judiciary and a reform of Book XI of the Italian Code of criminal Procedure.

=== September 2014 ===
On 1 September 2014, the Italian Prime Minister explained in a press conference that the site "passodopopasso.italia.it" would allow citizens to monitor the progress of the government's program.

On 3 September 2014, the "Millegiorni" website provided guidelines on the reform of the school that will be subject to consultation for two months.

=== October 2014 ===
On 8 October 2014, the Italian Senate approved the so-called Jobs Act, with 165 voting in favour and 111 against. The provision was criticized by the CGIL trade union and the Senators Felice Casson, Corradino Mineo and Lucrezia Ricchiuti, who did not take part in the vote.

On 8 October 2014, the Italian Prime Minister presented the Italian Finance Bill (or Legge di Stabilità).

=== December 2014 ===
Following approval of the Jobs Act by the Italian Parliament (Delegation Law No. 183 10 December 2014), the Italian government issued on 24 December 2014, the first legislative decree concerning contracts with growing protection.
