= Gentiloni government =

64th government of the Italian Republic

Gentiloni Cabinet
- 64th Cabinet of Italy

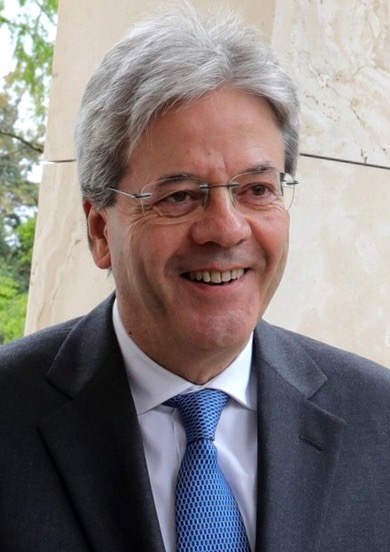
- Date formed: 12 December 2016
- Date dissolved: 1 June 2018 (537 days)

People and organisations
- Head of state: Sergio Mattarella
- Head of government: Paolo Gentiloni
- No. of ministers: 19 (incl. Prime Minister)
- Member parties: PD, AP, CpE
- Status in legislature: Majority (coalition)
- Opposition parties: M5S, FI, LN, SI, FdI, UdC, ALA (until Oct. 2017), MDP (since Oct. 2017)

History
- Outgoing election: 2018 election
- Legislature term: XVII Legislature (2013–2018)
- Predecessor: Renzi government
- Successor: First Conte government

The Gentiloni government was the 64th government of the Italian Republic, in office from 12 December 2016 to 1 June 2018. The government was headed by Paolo Gentiloni, former Minister of Foreign Affairs of the Renzi government.

The government was formed after Matteo Renzi's resignation as Prime Minister due to the result of the 2016 Italian constitutional referendum. The new government preserved most of the ministers of the former Renzi government. It was led by the centre-left Democratic Party (PD) and included the New Centre-Right (NCD) and the Centrists for Europe (CpE) as junior partners. It also included a few non-party independents. The NCD was later merged into Popular Alternative (AP).

== History ==
=== Background and formation ===
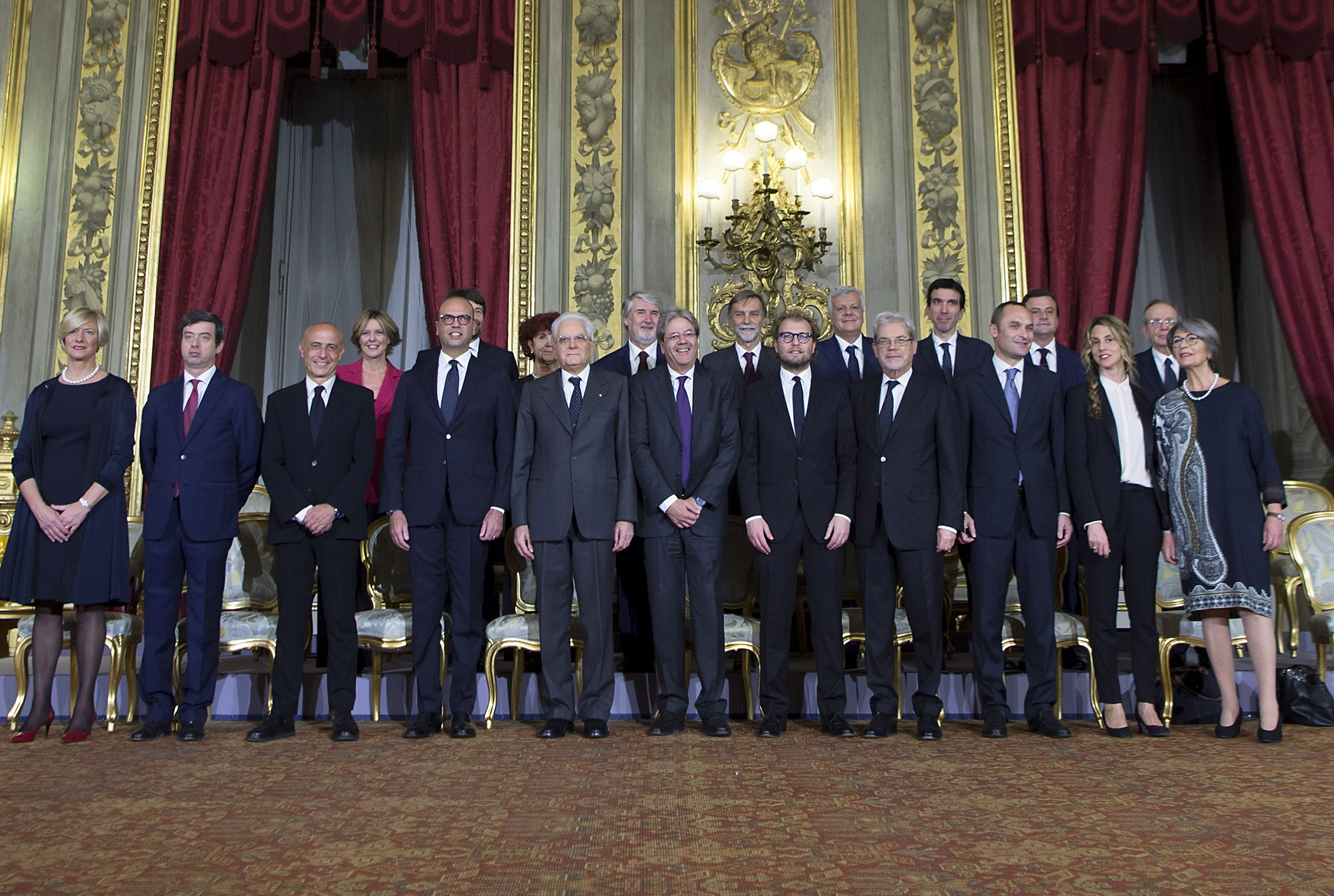
Gentiloni's government during the oath.

On 7 December 2016, Prime Minister Matteo Renzi announced his resignation, following the rejection of his proposals to overhaul the Senate of the Republic in the 2016 constitutional referendum. A few days later, on 11 December 2016, President Sergio Mattarella asked Paolo Gentiloni, then Minister of Foreign Affairs, to form a new government. On the following day, Gentiloni was officially sworn in as the new head of the government.

Gentiloni formed a coalition government supported by his own Democratic Party, the New Centre-Right and the Centrists for Italy. This was the same majority which supported Renzi's government for almost three years. The centrist Liberal Popular Alliance, led by Denis Verdini, did not support the new government, because no party member was appointed minister. Deputy ministers of the Italian Socialist Party and Solidary Democracy were also appointed. After the split of the Democratic and Progressive Movement from the Democratic Party, that party was presented by one deputy minister in the government until 3 October 2017.

=== Investiture votes ===
13–14 December 2016 Investiture votes for the Gentiloni government
House of Parliament	Vote	Parties	Votes
Senate of the Republic (Voting: 268 (Note: Absent (44): ALA (17), Lega (9), M5S (4), GAL–UDC (4), FI (3), AP–CpE–NCD (1), CR (1), Others (5) On institutional leave (7): Lega (3), Aut (2), FI (1), PD (1) President (1)) of 320, Majority: 135)	Yes	PD (111), AP–NCD (28), PSI–SVP–MAIE (16), GAL–UDC (3), Others (11)	169 / 268
Senate of the Republic (Voting: 268 of 320, Majority: 135)	No	FI (38), M5S (31), CR (9), GAL–UDC (7), ALA (1), MAIE (1), Others (12)	99 / 268
Senate of the Republic (Voting: 268 of 320, Majority: 135)	Abstention	None	0 / 268
Chamber of Deputies (Voting: 473 (Note: Absent (142): M5S (86), Lega (17), NcI–SC–MAIE (13), FI (6), CeI (4), PD (3), FdI (2), SI–SEL–P (2), AP–CpE–NCD (1), DemoS–CD (1), Others (7) On institutional leave (14): M5S (5), NcI–SC–MAIE (3), Lega (2), PD (2), FI(1), Others (1)) of 629, Majority: 237)	Yes	PD (296), AP–NCD (25), CeI (12), DemoS–CD (12), Others (23)	368 / 473
Chamber of Deputies (Voting: 473 of 629, Majority: 237)	No	FI (43), SI (28), FdI (8), CeI (1), Others (25)	105 / 473
Chamber of Deputies (Voting: 473 of 629, Majority: 237)	Abstention	None	0 / 473

== Party breakdown ==
=== Beginning of term ===
==== Ministers ====
- Democratic Party
13
- New Centre-Right
3
- Centrists for Europe
1
- Independents
2

==== Ministers and other members ====
- Democratic Party (PD): Prime minister, 12 ministers, 3 deputy ministers, 16 undersecretaries
- New Centre-Right (NCD): 3 ministers, 1 deputy minister, 10 undersecretaries
- Centrists for Europe (CpE): 1 minister
- Solidary Democracy (DemoS): 2 deputy ministers
- Italian Socialist Party (PSI): 1 deputy minister
- Democratic Centre (CD): 1 undersecretary
- Civics and Innovators (CI): 1 undersecretary
- Independents: 2 ministers, 4 undersecretaries

=== End of term ===
==== Ministers ====
- Democratic Party
14
- Popular Alternative
2
- Centrists for Europe
1

==== Ministers and other members ====
- Democratic Party (PD): Prime minister, 13 ministers, 2 deputy ministers, 16 undersecretaries
- Popular Alternative (AP): 2 ministers, 1 deputy minister, 8 undersecretaries
- Centrists for Europe (CpE): 1 minister
- Solidary Democracy (DemoS): 2 deputy ministers
- Italian Socialist Party (PSI): 1 deputy minister
- Independents: 3 undersecretaries
- Democratic Centre (CD): 1 undersecretary
- Civics and Innovators (CI): 1 undersecretary
- Forza Europa (FE): 1 undersecretary

== Geographical breakdown ==
=== Beginning of term ===
- Northern Italy: 9 ministers
  - Emilia-Romagna: 4 ministers
  - Lombardy: 2 ministers
  - Liguria: 2 ministers
  - Piedmont: 1 minister
- Central Italy: 7 ministers (incl. Gentiloni)
  - Lazio: 6 ministers
  - Tuscany: 1 minister
- Southern and Insular Italy: 3 ministers
  - Sicily: 2 ministers
  - Calabria: 1 minister

=== End of term ===
- Northern Italy: 7 ministers
  - Emilia-Romagna: 4 ministers
  - Liguria: 2 ministers
  - Lombardy: 1 minister
- Central Italy: 7 ministers (incl. Gentiloni)
  - Lazio: 6 ministers
  - Tuscany: 1 minister
- Southern and Insular Italy: 3 ministers
  - Sicily: 2 ministers
  - Calabria: 1 minister

== Council of Ministers ==
Office	Name	Party	Term
Prime Minister	Paolo Gentiloni	PD	2016–2018
Minister of Foreign Affairs	Angelino Alfano	NCD / AP	2016–2018
Minister of the Interior	Marco Minniti	PD	2016–2018
Minister of Justice	Andrea Orlando	PD	2016–2018
Minister of Defence	Roberta Pinotti	PD	2016–2018
Minister of Economy and Finance	Pier Carlo Padoan	Ind. / PD	2016–2018
Minister of Economic Development	Carlo Calenda	Ind. / PD	2016–2018
Minister of Agricultural, Food and Forestry Policies	Maurizio Martina	PD	2016–2018
Minister of Agricultural, Food and Forestry Policies	Paolo Gentiloni (ad interim)	PD	2018
Minister of the Environment	Gian Luca Galletti	CpE	2016–2018
Minister of Infrastructure and Transport	Graziano Delrio	PD	2016–2018
Minister of Labour and Social Policies	Giuliano Poletti	PD	2016–2018
Minister of Education, University and Research	Valeria Fedeli	PD	2016–2018
Minister of Culture and Tourism	Dario Franceschini	PD	2016–2018
Minister of Health	Beatrice Lorenzin	NCD / AP	2016–2018
Minister for Parliamentary Relations	Anna Finocchiaro	PD	2016–2018
Minister of Public Administration	Marianna Madia	PD	2016–2018
Minister of Regional Affairs	Enrico Costa	NCD / AP	2016–2017
Minister of Regional Affairs	Paolo Gentiloni (ad interim)	PD	2017-2018
Minister for Territorial Cohesion	Claudio De Vincenti	PD	2016–2018
Minister for Sport	Luca Lotti	PD	2016–2018
Secretary of the Council of Ministers	Maria Elena Boschi	PD	2016–2018

== Composition ==
Office	Portrait	Name	Term of office	Party
Prime Minister		Paolo Gentiloni	12 December 2016 – 1 June 2018	Democratic Party
Prime Minister	Undersecretaries: Maria Elena Boschi (PD) – Delegated to the Implementation of the Government Program, Equal Opportunities and Independent Administrative Authorities; Sandro Gozi (PD) – Delegated to the European Policies; Sesa Amici (PD) – Delegated to Information and Publishing; Luciano Pizzetti (PD) – Delegated to the Authority for the Security of the Republic; Angelo Rughetti (PD) – Delegated to the Coordination of Public Policies in the Economic, Social, and Scientific Research Fields (since 26 July 2017); Paola De Micheli (PD) – Delegated to the Earthquakes of Central Italy in 2016 and 2017 (since 23 September 2017)			
Minister of Foreign Affairs		Angelino Alfano	12 December 2016 – 1 June 2018	Popular Alternative; Before 18 March 2017: New Centre-Right
Minister of Foreign Affairs	Deputy Minister: Mario Giro (DemoS); Undersecretaries: Vincenzo Amendola (PD); Benedetto Della Vedova (FE)			
Minister of the Interior		Marco Minniti	12 December 2016 – 1 June 2018	Democratic Party
Minister of the Interior	Deputy Minister: Filippo Bubbico (MDP) (Note: before 25 February 2017: PD) (until 9 November 2017); Undersecretaries: Gianpiero Bocci (PD); Domenico Manzione (Ind.)			
Minister of Justice		Andrea Orlando	12 December 2016 – 1 June 2018	Democratic Party
Minister of Justice	Undersecretaries: Federica Chiavaroli (AP) (Note: before 18 March 2017: NCD); Cosimo Ferri (PD); Gennaro Migliore (PD)			
Minister of Defence		Roberta Pinotti	12 December 2016 – 1 June 2018	Democratic Party
Minister of Defence	Undersecretaries: Gioacchino Alfano (AP); Domenico Rossi (CD)			
Minister of Economy and Finance		Pier Carlo Padoan	12 December 2016 – 1 June 2018	Democratic Party; Before January 2018: Independent
Minister of Economy and Finance	Deputy Ministers: Luigi Casero (AP); Enrico Morando (PD); Undersecretaries: Pier Paolo Baretta (PD); Paola De Micheli (PD) (until 23 September 2017)			
Minister of Economic Development		Carlo Calenda	12 December 2016 – 1 June 2018	Democratic Party; Before March 2018: Independent
Minister of Economic Development	Deputy Minister: Teresa Bellanova (PD); Undersecretaries: Antonio Gentile (AP); Antonello Giacomelli (PD); Ivan Scalfarotto (PD)			
Minister of Agricultural, Food and Forestry Policies		Maurizio Martina	12 December 2016 – 13 March 2018	Democratic Party
Minister of Agricultural, Food and Forestry Policies		Paolo Gentiloni (Acting)	13 March 2018 – 1 June 2018	Democratic Party
Minister of Agricultural, Food and Forestry Policies	Deputy Minister: Andrea Olivero (DemoS); Undersecretary: Giuseppe Castiglione (AP)			
Minister of the Environment		Gian Luca Galletti	12 December 2016 – 1 June 2018	Centrists for Europe
Minister of the Environment	Undersecretaries: Barbara Degani (AP); Silvia Velo (PD)			
Minister of Infrastructure and Transport		Graziano Delrio	12 December 2016 – 1 June 2018	Democratic Party
Minister of Infrastructure and Transport	Deputy Minister: Riccardo Nencini (PSI); Undersecretaries: Umberto Del Basso De Caro (PD); Simona Vicari (AP) (until 25 May 2017)			
Minister of Labour and Social Policies		Giuliano Poletti	12 December 2016 – 1 June 2018	Democratic Party
Minister of Labour and Social Policies	Undersecretaries: Franca Biondelli (PD); Luigi Bobba (PD); Massimo Cassano (AP) (until 25 July 2017)			
Minister of Education, University and Research		Valeria Fedeli	12 December 2016 – 1 June 2018	Democratic Party
Minister of Education, University and Research	Undersecretaries: Vito De Filippo (PD); Gabriele Toccafondi (AP); Angela D'Onghia (Ind.) (until 4 December 2017)			
Minister of Cultural Heritage and Activities and Tourism		Dario Franceschini	12 December 2016 – 1 June 2018	Democratic Party
Minister of Cultural Heritage and Activities and Tourism	Undersecretaries: Dorina Bianchi (AP); Ilaria Borletti Buitoni (PD); Antimo Cesaro (CI)			
Minister of Health		Beatrice Lorenzin	12 December 2016 – 1 June 2018	Popular Alternative; Before 18 March 2017: New Centre-Right
Minister of Health	Undersecretary: Davide Faraone (PD)			
Minister for Parliamentary Relations (without portfolio)		Anna Finocchiaro	12 December 2016 – 1 June 2018	Democratic Party
Minister of Public Administration (without portfolio)		Marianna Madia	12 December 2016 – 1 June 2018	Democratic Party
Minister of Regional Affairs and Autonomies (without portfolio)		Enrico Costa	12 December 2016 – 19 July 2017 (Note: Costa resigned due to contrasts with the Prime Minister. He often criticized Gentiloni's views and ideas, especially regarding immigration and birthright citizenship.)	Popular Alternative; Before 18 March 2017: New Centre-Right
Minister of Regional Affairs and Autonomies (without portfolio)		Paolo Gentiloni (Acting)	19 July 2017 – 1 June 2018	Democratic Party
Minister of Regional Affairs and Autonomies (without portfolio)	Undersecretary: Gianclaudio Bressa (PD) (until 26 July 2017)			
Minister for Territorial Cohesion (without portfolio)		Claudio De Vincenti	12 December 2016 – 1 June 2018	Democratic Party
Minister for Sport (without portfolio)		Luca Lotti	12 December 2016 – 1 June 2018	Democratic Party
Secretary of the Council of Ministers		Maria Elena Boschi	12 December 2016 – 1 June 2018	Democratic Party
