= Domenico Rossi (general) =

Italian politician

Domenico Rossi OMRI, KSG
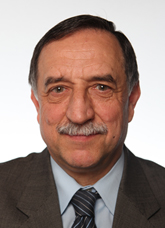

Member of the Chamber of Deputies
- In office 15 March 2013 – 22 March 2018
- Constituency: Lazio 1

Personal details
- Born: 15 May 1951 (age 75) Rome
- Party: SC (2013); PpI (2013–15); CD (since 2016)
- Education: Military Academy of Modena

Military service
- Allegiance: Italy
- Branch/service: Italian Army
- Rank: General of the Army

Domenico Rossi (born 15 May 1951 in Rome) is an Italian general and politician.

A corps general in the Italian army and former chief of army staff, from 2013 he has been a deputy in the 27th legislature for the Civic Choice party, part of the For Italy parliamentary group and Undersecretary of State for Defence in the Renzi and Gentiloni governments.

== Biography ==
Domenico Rossi was born in 1951 in Rome. Having already completed a degree in strategic sciences, in 2003 he obtained a degree in political science.

=== Military activity ===
A pupil of the 151st course of the Military Academy of Modena from 1969 to 1971, he then attended the Turin Application School as an infantry lieutenant, after which he was appointed lieutenant in 1973. He serves at the XXII "Serenissima" tank battalion in San Vito al Tagliamento. From 1983 to 1984 he was an officer in charge of the IT Office of the Army Staff, and until 1990 in the Ordinance Office and the Recruitment Office.

From 1990 to 1991 he was Commander of the armoured battalion M. O. Butera near L'Aquila. From 1995 to 1996 he was Commander of the Armored Regiment of Teulada. From 1996 to 1997 he was Head of the Recruitment, State and Advancement Office of the Army Staff and until September 2000 he was Head of the Recruitment, State and Advancement Office of the Defense Staff. From 1997 to 2000 he was also a member of the NATO Committee for the entry of women into the NATO Armed Forces and a member of the Advisory Committee of the Chief of Defense Staff for the entry of women into the Italian Armed Forces.

Promoted to brigadier general, from September 2000 to September 2001 he was Commander of the Mechanized Brigade "Granatieri di Sardegna". From 19 April 2002 to 7 June 2006 he was also President of the Intermediate Representative Council of the Inspectorate for the Recruitment and Completion Forces of military personnel. From 10 March 2004 to 18 September 2007 he was Head of the Legal and Economic Affairs Department of the Army Staff.

Since August 2006 he has been president of the Central Representative Council (COCER) of the Army and Joint Forces, a position he will leave in July 2012. On 19 September 2007, he took up the post of Commander of the Central Military Region and of the Military Command of the Capital. On 1 January 2008, he was promoted to General Corps. In August 2010 he was appointed Deputy Chief of Staff of the Army by Minister of Defence Ignazio La Russa and remained in office until April 2013.

=== Political activity ===
In 2013 he was placed on extraordinary leave to participate in the political elections of 24 and 25 February 2013, as a candidate for the Chamber of Deputies, in the Lazio 1 constituency, on the Civic Choice list, being elected Deputy of the XVII Legislature.

After his election, he was ex officio placed on unpaid leave for the duration of his parliamentary mandate.

In the Chamber of Deputies, he was a member of the Authorization Committee, of which he is also secretary, of the IV Standing Committee (Defense), of the Parliamentary Committee for Prosecutions, of which he was also secretary, and of the OSCE Parliamentary Assembly Delegation.

On 10 December 2013, together with the popular component of Civic Choice, he left the party and the parliamentary group and joined the group For Italy and the Populars for Italy party.

On 27 January 2014, he was one of the members of the Italian Parliamentary Delegation who visits Massimiliano Latorre and Salvatore Girone, the two Italian soldiers detained in India due to the Enrica Lexie accident.

On 28 February 2014, he was appointed Undersecretary of State to the Ministry of Defence of the Renzi government.

In view of the 2014 European elections, he was a candidate on the New Centre-Right – Union of the Centre list in the Central Italy constituency, obtaining 7,567 votes and not being elected.

On 3 June 2015, the Populars for Italy decided to abandon the government majority; Rossi left the party and remained in the majority, later joining the Bruno Tabacci's party Democratic Centre.

At the beginning of 2016, he announced his candidacy in the primaries of the PD for the candidate for mayor of Rome. He got 1,320 preferences (3%). In the following municipal elections in Rome in 2016, Rossi was a candidate on the "More Rome – Democrats and Populars" list in support of the PD candidate Roberto Giachetti, without being elected.

On 29 December of the same year, he was confirmed Undersecretary of Defence in the Gentiloni government.

== Honours and awards ==
- Italy: Knight of the Order of Merit of the Italian Republic (1992)
- Italy: Gold Cross for Seniority of Military Service (1995)
- Holy See: Knight of the Order of St. Gregory the Great (2000)
- Italy: Silver Medal of Merit from the Italian Red Cross
- Italy: Maurician medal
- Italy: Commander of the Order of Merit of the Italian Republic (2009)
