= Valeria Fedeli =

Italian politician (1949–2026)

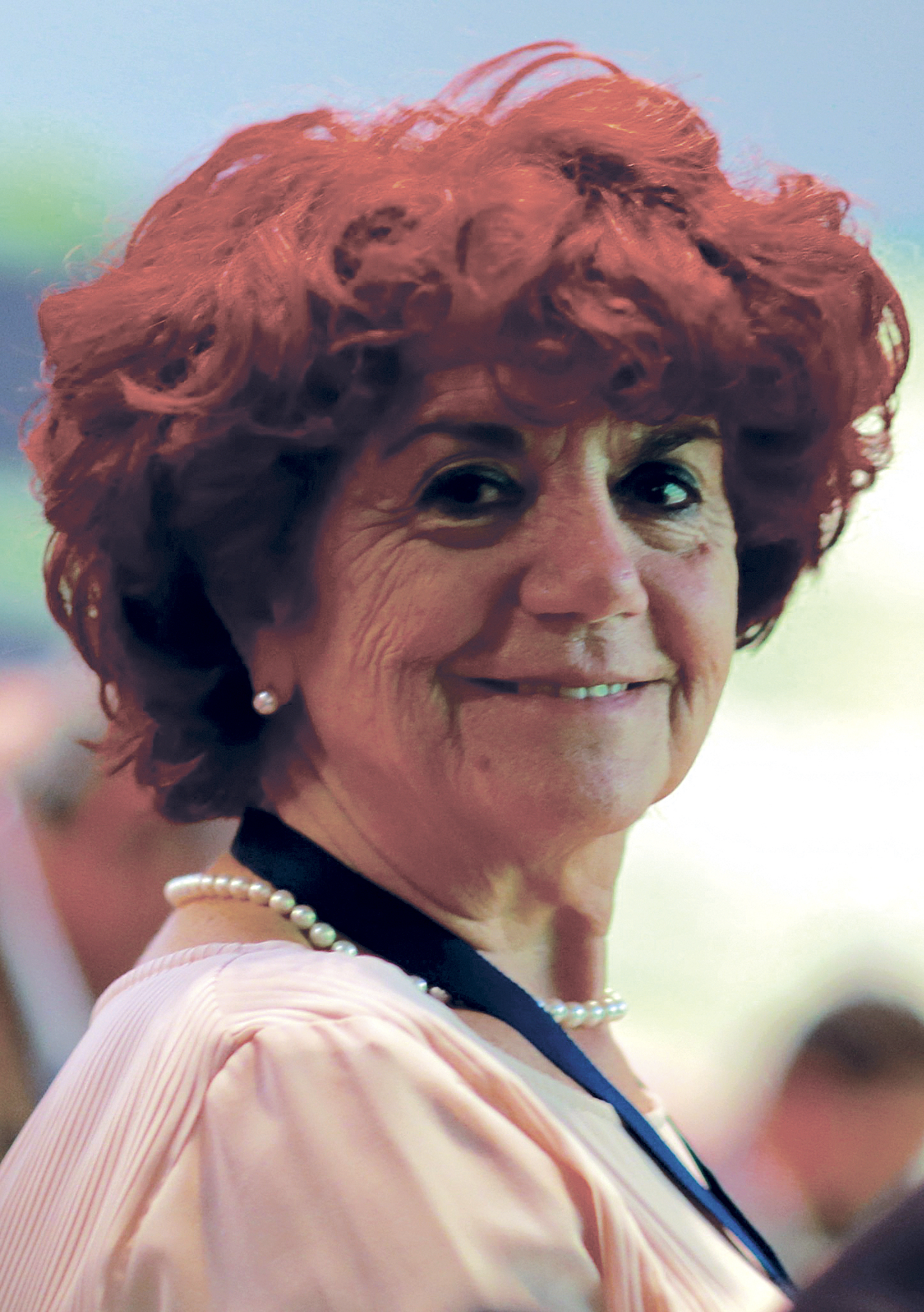
- Fedeli in 2017

Minister of Education, Universities and Research
- In office 12 December 2016 – 1 June 2018
- Prime Minister: Paolo Gentiloni
- Preceded by: Stefania Giannini
- Succeeded by: Marco Bussetti

Member of the Senate
- In office 15 March 2013 – 12 October 2022
- Constituency: Tuscany (2013–2018); Campania (2018–2022)

Personal details
- Born: 29 July 1949 Treviglio, Italy
- Died: 14 January 2026 (aged 76) Rome, Italy
- Party: Democratic Party
- Spouse: Achille Passoni
- Occupation: Politician; trade unionist

Valeria Fedeli (29 July 1949 – 14 January 2026) was an Italian politician who was Minister of Education, Universities and Research in the Gentiloni Cabinet.

== Life and career ==
=== Early career ===
Fedeli began her career in the 1970s as a kindergarten teacher in Milan, and then went to Rome in order to work at the national secretariat of the Italian General Confederation of Labour (CGIL), the largest trade in union in Italy. In 1994 she joined the national directorate of the union.

In 2013, during the Silvio Berlusconi's Rubygate Scandal, Fedeli was among the founders of the feminist committee Se non ora, quando? (If not now, when?) to denounce the "degrading model flaunted by one of the highest offices of the State, damaging the dignity of women and institutions".

=== Political career ===
In 2012, she left the CGIL in order to be a candidate for the Senate with the Democratic Party at the 2013 elections. Once elected, she became Vice-president of the Senate and, while the President of the Senate Pietro Grasso held the function of acting President of Italy, she presided over the work of the Senate as vicar Vice-president: in this role, she helped the President of the Chamber of Deputies Laura Boldrini in conducting the work of Parliament in joint session for the election of the President of the Italian Republic, which led to the presidency Sergio Mattarella.

On 12 December 2016, after the resignation of the Renzi Cabinet, Paolo Gentiloni became the new Prime Minister, and Fedeli became Minister of Education, Universities and Research.

She was re-elected as Senator at the 2018 elections and was the Democratic Party candidate for the role of President of the Senate; eventually the elected president was Maria Elisabetta Alberti Casellati from Forza Italia.

=== Personal life and death ===
Fedeli was married to former Democratic Party senator Achille Passoni.

Fedeli died in Rome on 14 January 2026, at the age of 76, following a long illness.

Trade union offices
Preceded by Agostino Megale	General Secretary of the Italian Federation of Textile and Garment Workers; 2000–2009	Succeeded by Union merged
