= Pier Paolo Baretta =

Italian politician

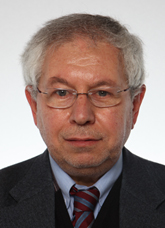

Member of the Chamber of Deputies
- In office 29 April 2008 – 22 March 2018
- Constituency: Veneto

Personal details
- Born: 29 June 1949 (age 76) Venice
- Party: Democratic Party

Pier Paolo Baretta (born 29 June 1949, in Venice) is an Italian Trade unionist and politician. He was the Undersecretary of state at the Ministry of Economy and Finance in the Conte II Cabinet. He previously held this position in the Letta, Renzi and Gentiloni Cabinets.

== Biography ==
Born and raised in Cannaregio. His training has roots in Catholic Associations and student youth movements. He graduated in Accountancy in 1970 and was hired by the engineering industry "Light Alloys Processing" of Porto Marghera and at the same time, he enrolled as a student – employee at the Faculty of Sociology of the University of Trento.

=== Trade union career ===
He enrolled in the Italian Federation of Metal Mechanics. In 1971, he was elected employee delegate on the works council. In 1972 he began his activity as a full-time trade unionist, as coordinator of employees of the Triveneto for the Federation of metalworkers. In the autumn of the same year he was called as a trade union operator at Fim-Cisl in Pordenone. At the end of 1973 he moved to the National Federation as training manager for the Fim, at the age of 24. In 1976 he entered the provincial secretariat of the Fim of Venice, of which he became general secretary in 1978. In 1982 he joined the regional secretariat of the Fim of Veneto, of which he later became general secretary. In 1984 he reached the national secretariat of the Fim, where he took on the roles of the steel industry, then of the organization and finally of the car. In the latter sector, it follows the difficult restructuring processes of Fiat.

=== Political career ===
Baretta resigned from all union posts, when in March he ran for the 2008 parliamentary elections on the Democratic Party list, and was elected to the Chamber of Deputies in the Veneto I district. During the Legislature XVI of Italy he was leader of the PD in the V Budget, Treasury and Economic Planning Commission and carried out an intense parliamentary activity: He was speaker of the Stability Law for 2009, 2010 and 2011, and of the reform of the State Budget. He also participated in the rewriting of article 81 of the Constitution which defines the principle of budget balance.

During the Monti Cabinet he is rapporteur of the Salva Italia decree and of the Stability Law for 2012, and he fought in particular for the increase of deductions for dependent children and for the financing of the Fund for social policies and non-self-sufficiency. Re-elected in the same constituency as leader in the 2013 general elections, on 2 May 2013 he was appointed by the Council of Ministers Undersecretary of State at the Ministry of Economy and Finance, alongside Minister Fabrizio Saccomanni in the Letta government, being confirmed in subsequent Renzi and Gentiloni governments under Pier Carlo Padoan.

In the general elections of 4 March 2018 he was a candidate for the Senate of the Republic for the Coalizione di centro-destra alle elezioni politiche italiane del 2018 (in the Democratic Party), in the majority college of Rovigo, but he was defeated, in fact coming third behind the center-right candidate Roberta Toffanin and the Movement 5 Stars Micaela D'Aquino.

Following the birth of the Conte II cabinet between PD, Movimento 5 Stelle and LeU, in September 2019 the Council of Ministers again appointed him Undersecretary of State at the Ministry of Economy and Finance, alongside the Minister of his own party Roberto Gualtieri.
