= Andrea Causin =

Italian politician from Veneto

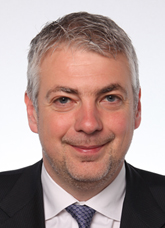
Andrea Causin

Andrea Causin (Mestre, 13 September 1972) is an Italian politician from Veneto.

A long-time member of the Christian Associations of Italian Workers (ACLI), he was first elected as municipal councillor in Martellago in 1994 for the Italian People's Party. Having briefly left politics, he was national secretary of ACLI's youth section and ACLI provincial president of Venice. In 2005 he was elected to the Regional Council of Veneto for a civic list in support of Massimo Carraro, the centre-left defeated candidate for president, and was re-elected in 2010 for the Democratic Party (PD).

In 2009 Causin was appointed regional deputy-secretary of the PD, but he resigned in 2010 over disagreements with party leadership. In early 2011 he left the PD altogether. Subsequently, he joined Toward North (VN), launched by Massimo Cacciari as an alternative both to the PD and Liga Veneta–Lega Nord. In 2012 Causin was appointed regional coordinator of Future Italy (IF), along with Manfredi Ravetto and Jacopo Silva. Through VN and IF, he joined Civic Choice (SC).

In the Italian general election Causin was elected to the Chamber of Deputies for SC.
