= Massimo Cassano =

Italian politician and entrepreneur (born 1965)

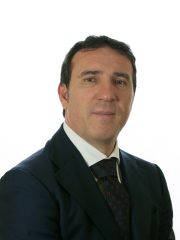
Massimo Cassano

Massimo Cassano (born 3 February 1965) is an Italian politician and entrepreneur.

== Background and early life ==
He is a graduate in Political Science at the University of Bari and has been a chartered accountant since 1994. Member of the Bari-Casamassima Rotary, he is honorary president of the Controvento Cultural Association. He also was a councilor and administrator of LUM and assistant in the same university in the history of law and philosophy of law chairs.

== Political career ==
At the age of 19 he began his political militancy in the Christian Democracy, as leader of its youth movement. In 1983 he became district councilor of Bari-Torre a Mare in Bari. In 1998 he joined Forza Italia, becoming its regional deputy coordinator.

In the local elections of 2004 he was elected to the Provincial Council of Bari, where he held the position of vicarious vice-president of the Forza Italia group. He remained provincial councilor until 2009.

He was a candidate in the Apulian regional elections of 2005 among the ranks of Forza Italia, being elected with 10,850 preferences in the regional council of Apulia.

In the 2013 Italian general election he was elected senator with The People of Freedom (PdL). On 16 November 2013, with the suspension of the activities of the PdL, he joined the New Centre-Right (NCD) led by Angelino Alfano, being indicated on the following 10 January 2014 as the new regional coordinator of the NCD in Apulia.

With the fall and the end of the Letta government at the behest of the new Democratic Party's secretary Matteo Renzi to become Prime Minister, and at the birth of his government, on 28 February 2014 he was appointed undersecretary of state at the Ministry of Labor and Social Policies, alongside the minister Giuliano Poletti.

He is a candidate in the 2014 European elections in the southern Italy constituency on the NCD-UDC list but with 18,800 he is not elected.

With the birth of the government chaired by Paolo Gentiloni, on 29 December 2016 he was confirmed in the role of undersecretary for labour.

On 21 July 2017 he announced his resignation from the post of undersecretary at the Ministry of Labour, to then return to Forza Italia on the following 25 July.At the same time, he founded the Popular Apulia movement, in the orbit of the centre-right coalition.

In the 2018 Italian general election, he was a candidate in the single-member constituency Bari-Bitonto for the Chamber of Deputies, supported by the centre-right coalition of Forza Italia, but was not re-elected.

In September 2018, his movement joined the majority of the regional council of Apulia, in support of the president of the Region Michele Emiliano, with the appointment of Giovanni Stea as assessor in his regional government.

On 7 January 2019 he was appointed extraordinary commissioner of the regional agency for active labor policies (ARPAL): the appointment aroused criticism both from the opposition and from the leftmost component of the majority.

In the 2019 European elections in Italy Cassano reached an agreement with Bruno Tabacci, national president of More Europe, to include a candidate from Popular Apulia in the party lists for the southern district.

In the 2020 Apulian regional election, Popular Apulia joined the "Popular with Emiliano" list, together with members of the Democratic Centre and former members of Popular Alternative and the Union of the Centre. The list eventually obtained 7 councilors and the reconfirm of Stea as assessor in the regional government.

In December 2020 he was confirmed at the helm of Arpal, with the role of general manager. In August 2021, a break occurred between Cassano and councilor Stea, which led the Popular Apulia movement to separate from the Populars with Emiliano. On 28 February, the Populars' component headed by Cassano left the group in the regional council to join the new "For Apulia" group, in support of the majority led by Michele Emiliano.

In view of the 2022 Italian general election, Cassano joined Action, a party led by Carlo Calenda allied with Italia Viva. Cassano was a candidate for the Chamber of Deputies, but was not elected. On 19 October, the regional council of Apulia voted for Cassano to be dismissed from his role as manager of ARPAL.

On 22 February 2023 he joined the UDC, being appointed head of the political secretariat of the party.
