= Maria Chiara Carrozza =

Italian engineer and politician (born 1965)

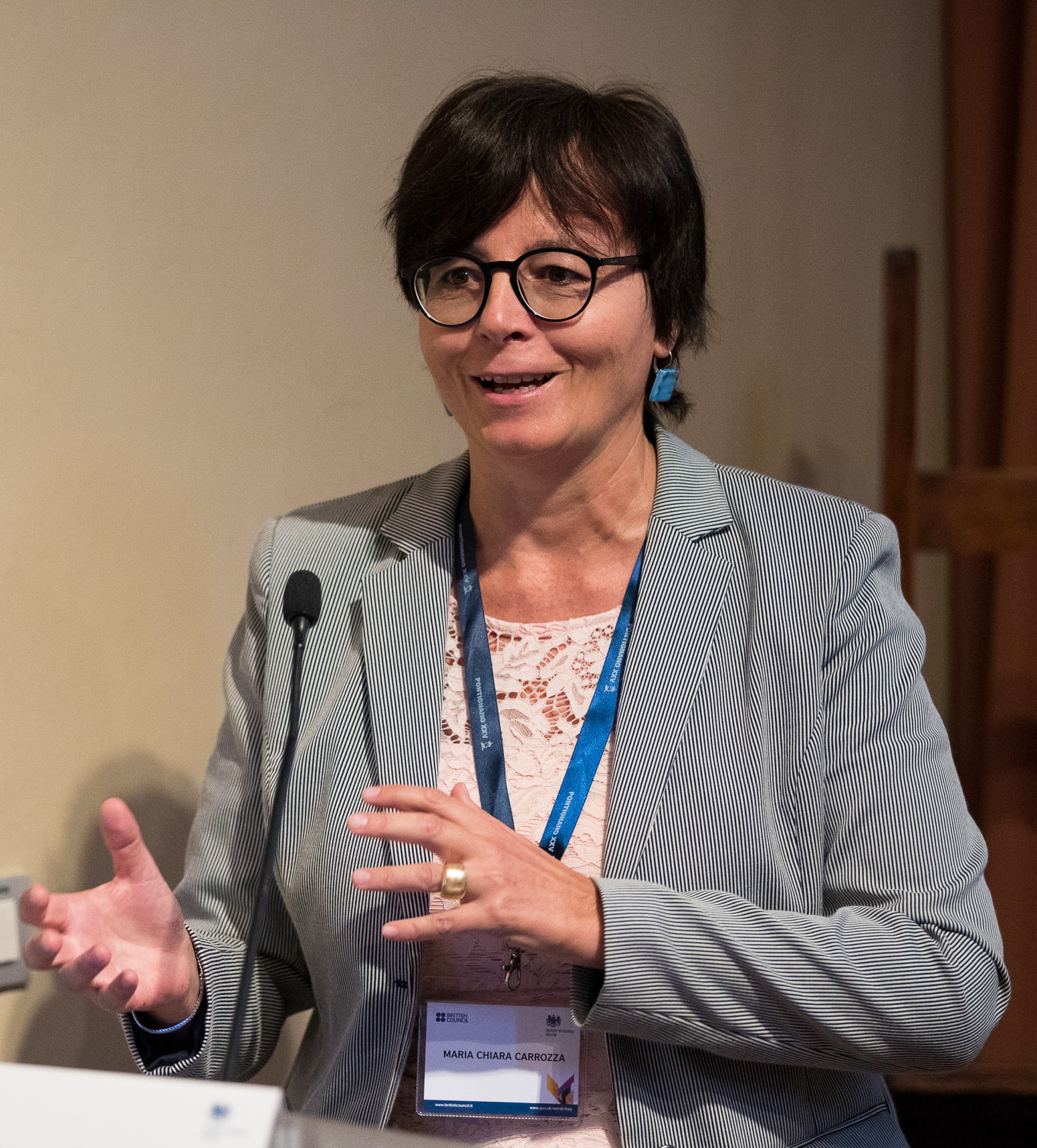

President of the National Research Council
- In office 12 April 2021 – 25 May 2025
- Preceded by: Massimo Inguscio
- Succeeded by: Andrea Lenzi

Minister of Education, University and Research
- In office 28 April 2013 – 22 February 2014
- Prime Minister: Enrico Letta
- Preceded by: Francesco Profumo
- Succeeded by: Stefania Giannini

Member of the Chamber of Deputies
- In office 15 March 2013 – 23 March 2018
- Constituency: Tuscany

Personal details
- Born: 16 September 1965 (age 60) Pisa, Italy
- Party: Democratic Party
- Education: University of Pisa, Sant'Anna School of Advanced Studies
- Occupation: Physicist, engineer, politician

Maria Chiara Carrozza (born 16 September 1965) is an Italian physicist, engineer and politician who served as Minister of Education, University and Research in the government of Prime Minister Enrico Letta between April 2013 and February 2014. She has been president of the National Research Council of Italy from April 2021 to May 2025.

== Early life and education ==
Carrozza received the Laurea degree in physics from the University of Pisa, Italy, in 1990 and a PhD in engineering at Scuola Superiore Sant'Anna (SSSA), in 1994.

== Career ==
Since November 2006, Carrozza has been a Full Professor of Biomedical Engineering and Robotics at SSSA. In the period 2007 to 2013 she was the Rector of SSSA, and the youngest rector in Italy on her appointment. She has scientific and coordination responsibilities within several national and international research projects. Her research interests are in rehabilitation engineering, wearable robotics, cybernetic hands, robotic devices for upper and lower limb functional replacement and augmentation, tactile sensors. She currently coordinates a group of 30 people, comprising Ph.D. students, post-docs and assistant professors. She is author of several scientific papers (more than 80 ISI papers and more than 120 papers in referred conference proceedings) and of 12 patents.

In the 2013 national elections, Carrozza was elected Member of the Italian Parliament. From April 28, 2013, until February 2014 she served as the Italian Minister for Education and Research. From March 2014 to May 2014 she was Member of the Committee on Productive activities, Commerce and Tourism of the Italian Parliament; since June 2014 she has been a Member of the Committee on Foreign Affairs of the Italian Parliament.

Since 2023, Carrozza has been a member of an expert group entrusted to support the interim evaluation of the European Union's Horizon Europe programme, chaired by Manuel Heitor.

Political offices
Preceded by Francesco Profumo	Italian Minister of Education; 2013-2014	Succeeded by Stefania Giannini
