= Dorina Bianchi =

Italian medic and politician (born 1966)

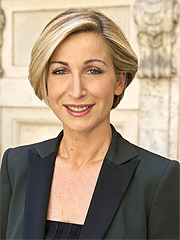

Member of the Chamber of Deputies
- In office 30 May 2001 – 29 April 2008
- In office 14 March 2013 – 22 March 2018

Member of the Senate of the Republic
- In office 29 April 2008 – 14 March 2013

Personal details
- Born: 3 June 1966 (age 60) Pisa, Italy
- Party: +E (since 2022)
- Other political affiliations: CCD (2001–2002); UdC (2002–2005; 2009–2011); DL (2005–2007); PD (2007–2009); PdL (2011–2013); NCD (2013–2017); AP (2017–2018)
- Education: Magna Græcia University
- Occupation: Neuroradiologist

Dorina Bianchi (born 3 June 1966) is an Italian medic and politician.

== Biography ==
Graduated in medicine and surgery, a neuroradiologist by profession, she was born in Pisa to Calabrian parents. She has always lived in Calabria, but due to her political activity, she is now divided between Rome and Crotone.

=== Political activity ===
Bianchi started her political experience on the occasion of the 2001 political elections, running for the House of Freedoms coalition and is elected to the Chamber of Deputies.

During the legislature, after having shown a certain intolerance within the centre-right coalition, accused of having initiated poor policies for the South, Bianchi moves on to The Daisy in the center-left side.

In the 2006 elections she therefore ran for the Chamber of Deputies on The Olive Tree list in Calabria, and she was re-elected. She is a candidate in the primary elections of the Democratic Party in 2007 and is elected in the national constituent assembly of the party.

In the 2008 elections she becomes a senator, elected for the lists of the Democratic Party in Calabria.

On 12 February 2009 she was elected leader of the Democratic Party group in the Hygiene and Health Commission of the Senate to replace Ignazio Marino, known for his secular positions on end-of-life matters. During the parliamentary debate on the living will, Bianchi repeatedly invoked freedom of conscience in view of the vote on the Calabrò bill on advance declarations of treatment, arousing much criticism from party colleagues. She also expressed herself in favor of the fact-finding investigation on the use of the RU486 pill, in disagreement with the rest of the party. Her appointment as group leader in the Health Committee was criticized in the Assembly of the Circles of the PD for the minority positions carried out during her mandate.

In the 2011 municipal elections she was nominated for mayor of Crotone by the centre-right coalition formed on the agreement between The People of Freedom and the Union of the Centre. Bianchi ranks second both in the first and the second round.

In the 2013 political elections, she was re-elected to the Chamber of Deputies. On November 16, 2013, with the suspension of the activities of the People of Freedom, she joined Angelino Alfano's New Centre-Right On 29 January 2016 she was appointed Undersecretary to the Ministry of Cultural Heritage and Activities and Tourism in the Renzi Cabinet and in December in the Gentiloni Cabinet.

After 17 years spent in Parliament, she didn't run for the 2018 elections.

In the elections of 2022 Bianchi runs for the Chamber of Deputies in the plurinominal college of Calabria with Emma Bonino's More Europe party.
