= Alberto Bombassei =

Italian politician (born 1940)

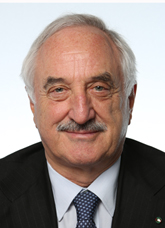
- Born: October 1940 (age 85); Vicenza, Italy
- Known for: Owner of Brembo
- Title: chairman and president of Brembo
- Spouse: married
- Children: 2
- Parent: Emilio Bombassei

Alberto Bombassei (born October 1940) is an Italian billionaire businessman, the chairman and president of Brembo, an Italian manufacturer of automotive brake systems. He controls 53.5% of Brembo.

He was born in Vicenza, Italy. His father Emilio Bombassei co-founded Brembo in 1961 with Italo Breda, and in 1975, Enzo Ferrari asked the company to provide braking systems for his Formula 1 racing cars.

He is married with two children, and lives in Bergamo, Italy.

In 2013 Bombassei was elected MP among the ranks of the Civic Choice party and held office until 2018. As of September 2020, he is a member of the Italian Aspen Institute.
