= Civics and Innovators =

Civics and Innovators Civici e Innovatori
- Chamber: Chamber of Deputies
- Foundation: 12 October 2016
- Dissolution: 23 March 2018
- Member parties: Civic Choice (splitters)
- Leader: Giovanni Monchiero (group/sub-group president)
- Ideology: Liberalism
- Political position: Centre
- Website: www.civicieinnovatori.it

Civics and Innovators (Italian: Civici e Innovatori, CI) was a centrist and liberal sub-group within the Mixed Group (previously a parliamentary group) in the Chamber of Deputies of the Italian Parliament. Its leader was Giovanni Monchiero.

The CI were demoted to sub-group in July 2017 for lack of members.

In August 2017 the sub-group was officially named Civics and Innovators for Italy, while in November 2017 it took the name of Civics and Innovators – Energies for Italy, after that some of its members joined Energies for Italy (EpI).

== History ==
=== Background ===
The group, which was formed by dissidents from Civic Choice (SC) in October 2016, was actually not new. In fact, until then it had been the official group of the party, which was launched by Mario Monti in the run-up of the 2013 general election and had later suffered several splits, including that of Monti, who returned to his independent status of senator for life.

Most notably, in mid 2016 SC was divided on the prospect of forming a joint group with Denis Verdini's Liberal Popular Alliance (ALA), as proposed by new party leader Enrico Zanetti. In July, after that the majority of the party's deputies had come in opposition of an alliance with ALA, Zanetti led four deputies (later joined by a fifth) out of the parliamentary group. Contextually, Zanetti, who pretended to be still the leader of SC, started to organise a joint group with the ALA and others. The party's national board finally sided with Zanetti later that month, and the national assembly did the same in October, with 63 votes in favour and 39 against.

This caused the final break-up of the party and the formation of two different parliamentary groups.

=== Formation and early months ===
The SC group eventually changed name into "Civics and Innovators" on 12 October 2016. At the time, it counted 15 deputies and was led by Giovanni Monchiero. Later that month the group was joined by two more deputies (Ivan Catalano and Mara Mucci), who were both former members of the Five Star Movement.

In December 2016 the group was generally supportive of the government led by Paolo Gentiloni (Democratic Party, PD), who replaced Matteo Renzi (also a Democrat) as Prime Minister. 12 deputies gave confidence to the cabinet, four deputies (Adriana Galgano, Salvatore Matarrese, Domenico Menorello and Mucci) were not present during the vote, and the remaining one (Pierpaolo Vargiu) voted against. In January 2017 deputy Mario Catania, a former minister of Agriculture, member of the Union of the Centre (UdC) and later of SC, left the group and joined the Democratic Centre (CD), consistently with his "progressive culture" and values. In February the group was briefly joined by Aniello Formisano, who had been elected for the CD in 2013 and would later join the left-wing Article One.

As of February 2017, the political alignment of group members was however heterogeneous. While the group leadership was keen on an alliance with the Democrats and Antimo Cesaro was confirmed undersecretary of Culture by Gentiloni, an increasing number of deputies was turning against the government. For instance, in January Vargiu, who had been elected in representation of the centre-right Sardinian Reformers, and Matarrese, a former president of SC, participated in the founding convention of Direction Italy (DI), a conservative party launched by Raffaele Fitto and built on the experience of the Conservatives and Reformists. Others (Gianfranco Librandi, Andrea Mazziotti and Stefano Dambruoso) took part, along with Mario Monti, Francesco Rutelli, Emma Bonino and the Italian Radicals, Carlo Scognamiglio and The Liberals, to a pro-Europeanist event organised by Benedetto Della Vedova (undersecretary of Foreign Affairs, former Radical and SC member) in February. From the event, titled Forza Europa! (Forward Europe!), Della Vedova would launch a movement and later a party named Forza Europa (FE).

=== Continuation as a sub-group ===
In June 2017 Giovanni Palladino, one of the group's left-wingers, left in order to join the PD, while right-wingers Vargiu and Matarrese switched to DI.

As a result, on 10 July the group was demoted to sub-group within the Mixed Group for lack of members.

Later in July, another left-leaning deputy, Librandi, left the CI in order to join the PD, reducing the sub-group's total to twelve deputies. Among its members, Menorello and Monchiero were increasingly involved with the centre-right Energies for Italy (EpI). As a result, in November the sub-group changed its name into "Civics and Innovators – Energies for Italy". In December Menorello and Monchiero were appointed by EpI's president Stefano Parisi to the party's political secretariat.

While EpI members were close to the centre-right coalition, the rest of the group, particularly those who joined to FE and subsequently formed More Europe (+Eu) with the Italian Radicals, part of the centre-left coalition led by Matteo Renzi and the PD in the 2018 general election. No CI member was elected.

== Leadership ==
- Leader in the Chamber of Deputies: Giovanni Monchiero (2016–2018)
