= Civic Choice =

Civic Choice Scelta Civica
- Founder: Mario Monti
- Founded: 4 January 2013
- Dissolved: 24 July 2019
- Merged into: Us with Italy
- Headquarters: Via Poli 29; 00184 Rome
- Women's wing: Civiche
- Ideology: Liberalism
- Political position: Centre
- Colours: Blue

Website
- www.sceltacivica.it

Civic Choice (Italian: Scelta Civica; SC) was a centrist and liberal political party in Italy founded by Mario Monti. The party was formed in the run-up of the 2013 general election to support the outgoing prime minister Monti and continue his political agenda. In the election SC was part of a centrist coalition named With Monti for Italy, along with Union of the Centre of Pier Ferdinando Casini and Future and Freedom of Gianfranco Fini.

In April 2013, SC became part of the grand coalition government led by Enrico Letta of the Democratic Party. In February 2014 after Letta's resignation, Civic Choice supported the cabinet of Matteo Renzi. After that, the party did not support the cabinet of Paolo Gentiloni; by the end of 2017, SC joined forces with Silvio Berlusconi's Forza Italia. Following the 2018 Italian general election, the party was disbanded on 24 July 2019.

== History ==
=== Foundation and composition ===
In order to compete in the upcoming general election, on 4 January 2013 technocratic prime minister Mario Monti launched SC as an electoral list of the "civil society" to implement his "agenda". It was announced that SC would be part of the With Monti for Italy (CMI) coalition, alongside the Union of the Centre (UdC) and Future and Freedom (FLI).

At its beginnings SC was composed of several groups and individuals, who were represented in the party's lists:

- Toward the Third Republic (Verso la Terza Repubblica, VTR), notably including:
  - Future Italy (Italia Futura, IF), led by Luca Cordero di Montezemolo;
  - leading figures of Catholic ecclesial movements, such as minister Andrea Riccardi of the Community of Sant'Egidio and Andrea Olivero of the Christian Associations of Italian Workers (ACLI);
  - Union for Trentino (Unione per il Trentino, UpT), led by Lorenzo Dellai;
  - Toward North (Verso Nord), led by Alessio Vianello;
- ministers of Monti's technical government, including Riccardi, Renato Balduzzi and Enzo Moavero Milanesi (a fourth minister, Mario Catania, ran with UdC; others, like Corrado Passera, chose not to endorse Monti);
- dissidents from The People of Freedom (PdL), including Mario Mauro, Gabriele Albertini and Giuliano Cazzola, plus others retiring from Parliament (Franco Frattini, Giuseppe Pisanu, etc.);
- dissidents from the Democratic Party (PD), including Pietro Ichino, Maria Paola Merloni, Alessandro Maran, Benedetto Adragna, plus others retiring from Parliament (Lucio D'Ubaldo, Flavio Pertoldi, etc.);
- Italian Union (Unione Italiana, UI), led by Gianfranco Librandi;
- individuals from other parties, such as Fabio Gava of the Italian Liberal Party (PLI) and Emanuela Baio of Alliance for Italy (ApI).
- other minor groups and individuals, notably including Linda Lanzillotta (a senator elected with ApI), Alberto Bombassei (a former vice president of Confindustria), Luigi Marino (president of Confcooperative), Mario Sechi, Ilaria Capua, Valentina Vezzali and Annalisa Minetti.

=== 2013 general election and aftermath ===
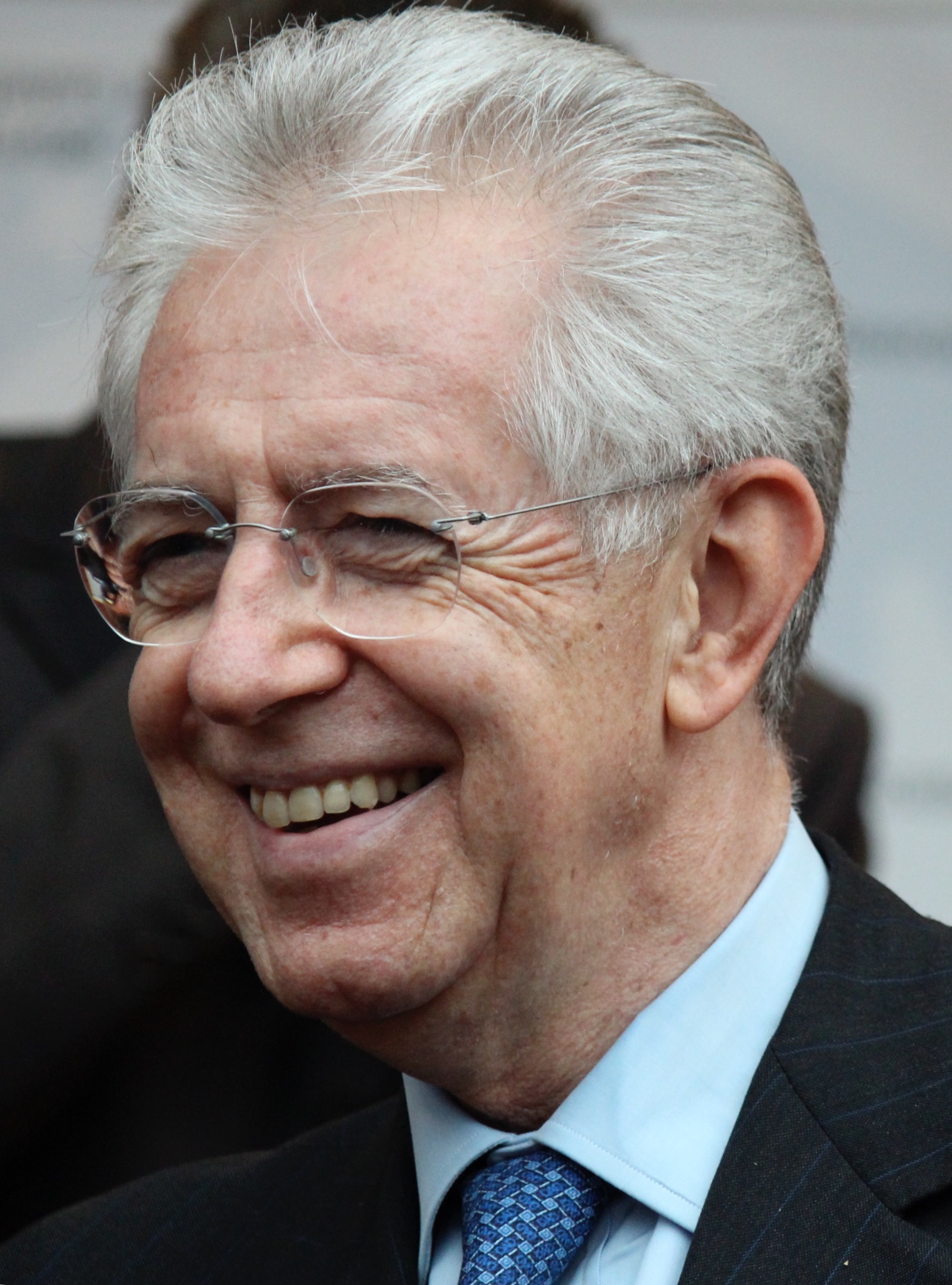
Mario Monti, former Prime Minister and party's founder

In the 2013 general election SC obtained 8.3% of the vote, 37 deputies (in its own lists) and 15 senators (within CMI). After the election, SC deputies and senators formed joint groups named "Civic Choice", including also UdC and FLI MPs, in both houses of Parliament.

In late April the party joined Enrico Letta's grand coalition government, which included three SC leading members: Mario Mauro as minister of Defence, Enzo Moavero Milanesi as minister of European Affairs and Carlo Calenda as deputy minister of Economic Development.

The party began to take shape too: on 13 March Monti, who replaced Andrea Riccardi as provisional president, appointed Andrea Olivero as coordinator; on 16 May Monti was unanimously elected president by the party's assembly; on 23 May the leadership proposed by Monti was approved with only three abstentions. In the event Olivero was confirmed coordinator, Alberto Bombassei was appointed first vice president, and Benedetto Della Vedova, a former member of the Italian Radicals, Forza Italia, the PdL and finally FLI, spokesperson. The rest of the leadership was composed mainly by former Democrats: Maria Paola Merloni (vice president), Lorenzo Dellai (party leader in the Chamber of Deputies), Gianluca Susta (party leader in the Senate), Andrea Causin (organizational secretary), Pietro Ichino (platform coordinator) and Gregorio Gitti (local structures' coordinator). No member of Future Italy, a liberal think tank, took a leading role.

Since then, the party was often riven by internal disputes. Monti twice presented (and later retracted) his resignation from president. In late July he clashed with the "Catholic" wing of the party, especially with Olivero, whom he accused of being too close to the UdC (whose deputies and senators were part of SC's parliamentary groups). Also Future Italy, seemed to have little patience with the "Catholic" wing and even to be willing to distance from the party.

In this phase, an issue which divided SC was the debate on European party affiliation. Some, including the party's "Catholics", former members of PdL and Monti himself, favoured joining the European People's Party (EPP), while others, notably those close to Future Italy, Benedetto Della Vedova and Linda Lanzillotta, preferred the Alliance of Liberals and Democrats for Europe (ALDE) Party. It later emerged that Monti had favoured the EPP and had consequently started talks with the EPP's leadership in order to appease the party's Christian democrats led by Mauro and avoid a split.

=== Monti's resignation and Populars' split ===
On 17 October 2013 Monti resigned as president of SC and was replaced by his deputy Alberto Bombassei as acting president. Monti cited his disagreement with 12 senators (out of 20), including Mario Mauro, Andrea Olivero, Gabriele Albertini, Pier Ferdinando Casini (UdC leader), Maria Paola Merloni, Luigi Marino and Lucio Romano. Particularly, Monti criticized Mauro's line of unconditioned support to the government and of transforming SC in a larger centre-right political party, open to the PdL. One of the 12 senators, Tito Di Maggio, was even unveiled as PdL–SC–UdC joint candidate for President in Basilicata.

After Monti's abrupt departure, spokesperson Benedetto Della Vedova, who represented the liberal wing of the party (including Pietro Ichino, Gianluca Susta, Linda Lanzillotta, etc.), announced that SC would "go on" as a "liberal, people's, reform and European party" and would never form a partnership with the PdL. Lanzillotta remarked that "Italy needs a liberal, people's, deeply reform-minded and Europeanist party" and that "we did not take votes for giving life to a Catholic party and being part of a centre-right still led by Berlusconi. For his part, during a TV interview, Monti stated that "my and SC's commitment does not end now" and that "many tell me they did not vote for SC for the specific reason that we were with president Casini; they might have been right".

On 22 October the executive committee voted in favour of the separation from the UdC. The "popular" majority of SC's parliamentary group in the Senate responded by dismissing Susta as floor leader, while Olivero stated that the Populars aimed at forming a party modelled on Germany's Christian Democratic Union. On 6 November the SC senatorial group, dominated by Populars, elected L. Romano as new floor leader; the decision was not endorsed by Bombassei and was opposed by Montiani and liberals, who talked about dismissing Lorenzo Dellai from leader in the Chamber as retaliation.

On 15 November the Populars walked away from the party's national assembly and left the party altogether. The assembly elected Bombassei president and appointed Stefania Giannini secretary. On 23 November the Populars, led by Mauro, Dellai and Olivero, launched Populars for Italy (PpI). On 10 December the party's break-up was effective in Parliament: 20 deputies (led by Dellai) and 12 senators (led by L. Romano) launched For Italy (PI) groups, while 26 deputies (led by Andrea Romano) and 8 senators (led by Susta) confirmed their allegiance to SC. All the UdC MPs but one joined PI.

=== From the centre to the Democrats ===
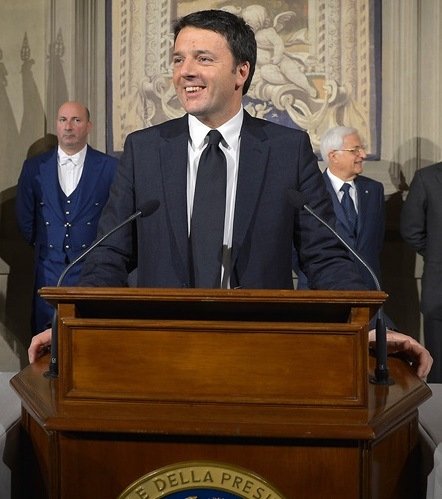
Matteo Renzi, announcing his government's composition

After Matteo Renzi's election as secretary of the Democratic Party (PD) in December, SC started to approach the centre-left, while ruling out any alliance with the centre-right, once again led by Silvio Berlusconi's Forza Italia (FI). SC had long expressed a certain affinity for Renzi, and, in early February 2014, Stefania Giannini finally declared that she saw "its party more as the right-wing of a reformed and reforming left than the left-wing of a right that still has in Berlusconi its standard-bearer".

Subsequently, SC was a keen supporter of the replacement of Enrico Letta with Renzi.

On 22 February 2014 the Renzi Cabinet was sworn in with Giannini, a university professor, as minister of Education.

On 4 March it was announced that SC would run in the 2014 European Parliament election within European Choice (SE), an electoral list including, among others, Democratic Centre, Act to Stop the Decline and the Italian Liberal Party. Members of SC topped SE's slates in two of five constituencies. The decision to side with the Alliance of Liberals and Democrats for Europe (ALDE) Party, cherished by Guy Verhofstadt (ALDE's candidate for President of the European Commission) and Romano Prodi, prompted the resignation of Andrea Causin, one of SC's few remaining Christian democrats, from organizational secretary.

On 10 April Bombassei resigned as president of the party, citing his disagreement with the party's political re-positionment (no longer a third-party force, but a close ally of Renzi's PD, under Giannini's leadership), the change in party's identity and "prevailing personal ambitions".

On election day SC/SE received just 0.7% of the vote and failed to return any MEPs. Consequently, Giannini resigned from secretary.

In October A. Romano, who had left the position of floor leader in the Chamber some months earlier, left the party in order to join the PD.

=== Party's congress and diaspora ===
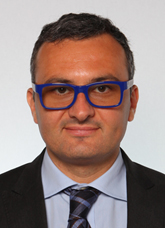
Enrico Zanetti, party leader since January 2015

In November the party's assembly decided that the new leadership, replacing Giannini and Balduzzi, who had been elected to the Supreme Council of Magistrature and had resigned from Parliament, will be selected in a congress to be held in January 2015.

Two candidates, Irene Tinagli and Enrico Zanetti, announced their bid for secretary, while Pietro Ichino was the front-runner to become the party's president. However, in mid December, Tinagli retired from the race. In January 2015 Benedetto Della Vedova came out against Zanetti on the grounds that SC should continue to exist only through its parliamentary groups, tried to stop the congress (along with Giannini, Bombassei, Ichino, Tinagli, Carlo Calenda, Linda Lanzillotta and other senior members) and finally decided to run for secretary (along with a third candidate, Luciana Cazzaniga). During the congress, postponed two weeks in order not to overlap with the presidential election triggered by President Giorgio Napolitano's resignation, Zanetti was virtually unanimously elected secretary.

However, on 6 February, two days before the congress, eight senior members of the party (including six former Democrats), including its minister (Giannini), its deputy minister (Calenda), two deputies and five senators (including Giannini), had already left the party; all of them, except Calenda (who later became minister), joined the PD. As a result, the party was deprived of its parliamentary group in the Senate. In fact, of the two remaining senators, Della Vedova left during the congress, while Monti was no longer active.

In two years, from the 2013 election to February 2015, SC had lost more than the half of its MPs, mostly to Popular Area and the PD.

=== Zanetti's leadership and further splits ===
In July 2015 the party's national board elected Salvatore Matarrese president, Angelo D'Agostino first vice president and Valentina Vezzali vice president. More important, the assembly decided that the party would change name and symbol by the end of the summer, in the effort of being more competitive in the 2016 municipal elections. The new chosen name, "Citizens for Italy", would be used only in local elections, indeed.

In January 2016, during a cabinet's reshuffle, Zanetti was promoted deputy minister of the Economy, while another SC deputy, Antimo Cesaro, was appointed undersecretary at Culture. Despite this, the party, which had virtually disappeared from opinion polls, continued to lose deputies and its group in the Chamber was reduced to 20 individuals by February. In the meantime, Zanetti explained that there were similarities between SC and Denis Verdini's Liberal Popular Alliance (ALA), and, according to Corriere della Sera, the two groups could soon merge. In the meantime, SC formed a federative pact with the Moderates.

In July, after that the majority of the party's deputies had come in opposition of an alliance with the ALA (a party basically formed by splinters form Berlusconi's FI), Zanetti led four deputies out of the parliamentary group. Contextually, Zanetti, who pretended to be still the leader of SC, started to organise a joint group with the ALA and, possibly, Flavio Tosi's Act!, and a new liberal party with the contribution of Marcello Pera, a former President of the Senate and former leader of FI in Tuscany. The party's national board sided with Zanetti in July and the national assembly did the same in October, with 63 votes in favour and 39 against.

This caused the final split of the party and the formation of two different parliamentary groups:

- "Civic Choice toward Cizitens for Italy – MAIE" (the official SC group), formed by eight deputies of the ALA, five of SC (Zanetti, D'Agostino, Vezzali, Rabino and Giulio Sottanelli, who was elected group leader), two of the Associative Movement Italians Abroad (MAIE) and one splinter from Act!; the group was renamed "Civic Choice – ALA for the Liberal and Popular Constituent Assembly – MAIE" in December 2016;
- Civics and Innovators, formed by the rump of the former SC group (Giovanni Monchiero stayed as group leader).

=== Road toward the centre-right ===
In April 2017 Rabino was elected president of the party.

In September 2017 Zanetti re-positioned SC from the centre-left to the centre-right and, more specifically, in close alliance with Berlusconi's FI. The 2017 Sicilian regional election, for which SC announced that its candidates would run within FI's lists, marked the first time that SC officially sided with the centre-right. In November, the party's national board endorsed Zanetti's political line and marked SC's official adhesion to the centre-right coalition. The decision was opposed by a vocal minority of the party's membership and three deputies (Ernesto Auci, D'Agostino and Vezzali) subsequently left and formed the European Civics.

In December 2017 SC was a founding member of Us with Italy (NcI), a pro-Berlusconi centrist electoral list within the centre-right coalition for the 2018 general election, along with Act!, splinters of Popular Alternative (AP – two groups, a liberal one led by Enrico Costa and a Christian-democratic one led by Maurizio Lupi), Direction Italy (DI), Cantiere Popolare (CP) and the Movement for the Autonomies (MpA). NcI was later enlarged to the UdC and Identity and Action (IdeA), with the goal of reaching 3%, required to win seats from proportional lists under a new electoral law.

In the election NcI obtained 1.3% and SC had no deputies or senators elected. The party was dissolved in July 2019 and was subsequently cancelled from the Register of Political Parties on 24 July 2019. Zanetti subsequently became a member of Us with Italy when it became a political party in 2021.

== Members ==
- Populars for Italy (2014)
- Civics and Innovators (2016)

== Electoral results ==
=== Italian Parliament ===
Election	Leader	Chamber of Deputies				Senate of the Republic			
Election	Leader	Votes	%	Seats	+/–	Votes	%	Seats	+/–
2013	Mario Monti	2,824,001 (4th)	8.3	37 / 630	New	2,797,486 (4th)	9.1	19 / 315	New
2018	Enrico Zanetti	Into NcI–UDC		0 / 630	▼37	Into NcI–UDC		0 / 315	▼19

=== European Parliament ===
Election	Leader	Votes	%	Seats	+/–	EP Group
2014	Stefania Giannini	Into SE		0 / 73	New	–

=== Regional Councils ===
Region	Election year	Votes	%	Seats	+/−
Aosta Valley	2013	—N/a	—N/a	0 / 35	–
Piedmont	2014	29,313 (10th)	1.5	1 / 50	▲1
Lombardy	2018	into Us with Italy	–	0 / 80	–
South Tyrol	2018	—N/a	—N/a	0 / 35	–
Trentino	2018	—N/a	—N/a	0 / 35	–
Veneto	2015	into Civic Veneto	–	0 / 51	–
Friuli-Venezia Giulia	2018	—N/a	—N/a	0 / 49	–
Emilia-Romagna	2014	into Civic Emilia-Romagna	–	0 / 50	–
Liguria	2015	—N/a	—N/a	0 / 31	–
Tuscany	2015	—N/a	—N/a	0 / 41	–
Marche	2015	into United for Marche	–	0 / 31	–
Umbria	2015	into Change in Umbria	–	0 / 20	–
Lazio	2018	into Us with Italy	–	0 / 50	–
Abruzzo	2019	—N/a	—N/a	0 / 31	▼1
Molise	2018	—N/a	—N/a	0 / 21	–
Campania	2015	62,975 (9th) (Note: In a joint list with Democratic Centre.)	2.8	1 / 51	▲1
Apulia	2015	into Emiliano Mayor of Apulia	–	0 / 51	–
Basilicata	2019	—N/a	—N/a	0 / 21	–
Calabria	2014	—N/a	—N/a	0 / 30	–
Sicily	2017	into Forza Italia	–	0 / 70	–
Sardinia	2019	—N/a	—N/a	0 / 60	–

== Leadership ==
- President: Andrea Riccardi (2013), Mario Monti (2013), Alberto Bombassei (2013–2014), Renato Balduzzi (2014), Salvatore Matarrese (2015–2016), Mariano Rabino (2017)
- First Vice President: Andrea Riccardi (2013), Alberto Bombassei (2013), Renato Balduzzi (2013–2014), Angelo D'Agostino (2015–2017)
- Vice President: Carlo Calenda (2013), Ilaria Capua (2013), Maria Paola Merloni (2013), Milena Santerini (2013), Luciano Cimmino (2013–2015), Ilaria Borletti Buitoni (2013–2015), Valentina Vezzali (2015–2017)
- Coordinator / Secretary: Andrea Olivero (2013), Stefania Giannini (2013–2014), Enrico Zanetti (2015–2017)
- Executive Secretary: Silvia Colombo (2013–2015)
- Organizational Secretary: Andrea Causin (2013–2014), Mariano Rabino (2014–2017)
- Spokesperson: Lelio Alfonso (2013–2015), Benedetto Della Vedova (2013–2015)
- Party Leader in the Chamber of Deputies: Lorenzo Dellai (2013), Andrea Romano (2013–2014), Andrea Mazziotti (2014–2015), Giovanni Monchiero (2015–2016), Giulio Sottanelli (2016–2018)
- Party Leader in the Senate: Mario Mauro (2013), Gianluca Susta (2013), Lucio Romano (2013), Gianluca Susta (2013–2015)
