= Enrico Zanetti =

Italian politician

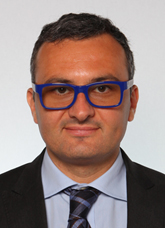

Secretary of Civic Choice
- In office 8 February 2015 – 24 July 2019
- Preceded by: Stefania Giannini
- Succeeded by: Party disbanded

Member of the Chamber of Deputies
- In office 15 March 2013 – 22 March 2018

Personal details
- Born: 12 August 1973 (age 53) Venice, Italy
- Party: Civic Choice (2013-2019); Us with Italy (since 2020)
- Education: University of Trieste

Enrico Zanetti (born 12 August 1973, Venice) is an Italian politician and tax advisor. He was appointed Secretary of Civic Choice in February 2015.

== Biography ==
Enrico Zanetti was born on 12 August 1973 in Venice; from 1990 to 1998 he moved to Gorizia and graduated in "Economics and Commerce" at the University of Trieste.

He works as a chartered accountant in his office in Venice, and he is a partner and director of an important tax study center based in Turin, "Eutekne".

From 2006 to 2010 he was an adjunct professor at the Ca' Foscari University of Venice and at the same time he was president of the Union of Young Chartered Accountants of Venice. From 2008 to 2012 he headed the Study Center of the National Council of Chartered Accountants and Accounting Experts. From 2011 to 2013 he was Vice President of the National Council of the Young Chartered Accountants Union and in the same period he was a member of the Civil Commission of the Italian Accounting Body.

In 2013 he was elected MP into the Civic Choice list, the party founded by the outgoing Prime Minister Mario Monti. He served as Undersecretary and subsequently as Deputy Minister of Economy and Finance in the Renzi Cabinet, from 28 February 2014 to 29 January 2016.

In the 2018 general election he was candidate among the ranks of Us with Italy, but he was not re-elected.
