= Mario Giro =

Italian trade-unionist

Deputy Minister of Foreign Affairs and International Cooperation
- In office 29 January 2016 – 1 June 2018
- President: Matteo Renzi
- Prime Minister: Enrico Letta
- Preceded by: Lapo Pistelli

Undersecretary of Foreign Affairs and International Cooperation
- In office 3 May 2013 – 29 January 2016
- President: Enrico Letta
- Preceded by: Marta Dassù
- Succeeded by: Vincenzo Amendola

Personal details
- Born: Mario Giro; 29 July 1958 (age 67) Rome
- Party: For Italy
- Relations: Francesco Giro (brother)
- Profession: politician, trade-unionist, mediator

Mario Giro (born 29 July 1958, in Rome) is an Italian trade-unionist, and since 1990 a mediator for peace in the Community of Sant'Egidio.

== Biography ==
Born in Rome on 29 July 1958, he earned his degree in mathematics and in 1984 graduated in to Sapienza.

In 1975 he became a member of the Community of Sant’Egidio and participated in the activities of school support for the poor children of the Roman periphery and since 1979 he became responsible for adolescent and young people of Sant'Egidio in different neighborhoods of the Roman periphery. In the mid -1980s, he began to engage in interreligious dialogue, especially with the Muslim world, and participated in the organization of international annual prayer encounters for peace.

Since 1989 he has been working in Africa for the development of the community of Sant'Egidio, Côte d'Ivoire and Cameroon. In 1996 he attended preliminary meetings in Rome to resolve the crisis in Burundi.

In 1996 participates in Rome in the pact negotiations for the future of Albania. In Kosovo, he helped implement the agreement of 1 September 1996 between Serbian President Milosevic and Kosovar leader Rugova, who guaranteed access to Kosovar Albanian schools in 1997–1998. Since 1998 he has been responsible for the international relations of the community of Sant'Egidio.

In 2006 he participated in several missions as a mediator in South Sudan. In 2012, he was adviser to the Minister for International Cooperation and Integration Andrea Riccardi.

=== Political activity ===
At the 2013 political elections he was nominated for the Senate of the Republic, in Campania, in the center list with Monti For Italy (third position), but he is the first of the non-elected.

On 2 May 2013, he was appointed Undersecretary for Foreign Affairs.

As undersecretary, he has exercised delegations on Latin America, Africa and the promotion of Italian language and culture; also organized the VI Latin American Conference in December 2012. In December 2013, he left Civic Choice to join the Popular For Italy and on 28 February 2014 he was confirmed as Foreign Undersecretary to the Renzi government; on 4 July 2014, the Popular Forces leave Italy to join Solidarity Democracy.

In 2014 he is among the promoters of the first general terms of the Italian language in the world, held in October of the same year in Florence and from that moment repeated on a two-yearly basis.

On 29 January 2016, the occasion of the government reshuffle, he became deputy minister of foreign affairs, leaving the former position as undersecretary. Charge confirmed 12 December 2016 also from the subsequent government led by Paolo Gentiloni.

He was awarded, on 5 November 2010, the Fondation Chirac Prize for Conflict Prevention.
