= Manfredi Ravetto =

Italian motor racing team manager

- Born: 13 March 1975 (age 51)

Manfredi Ravetto (born 13 March 1975) is an Italian former team manager at Caterham's Formula 1 team.

== Career ==
Ravetto is a graduate of economics. For five years he was sports director for Formula 3000 and German Formula 3. He also worked in the marketing department of Minardi's Formula 1 team. In 2003 he became the sports director of Team Draco Multiracing USA in Euro Formula 3000.

Ravetto was the manager of racing driver Bertrand Baguette. He also worked in the HRT F1 Team, where he was responsible for the business side of the team. On July 2, 2014, he became deputy head of Caterham, and in September replaced Christijan Albers as team leader.
