= Lucio D'Ubaldo =

Italian politician

Lucio D'Ubaldo (born 23 February 1955) is an Italian politician.

D'Ubaldo was born in Magliano Sabina, Rieti. He earned his BA in Philosophy, he is also writer and journalist.

Lucio D'Ubaldo is a member of national board of Democratic Party (Italy).

He has been Secretary General of ANCI, the National Association of Italian Municipalities (1986–1996), president of Health Agency of Latium (2005–2010), member of the board of Italian bank Cassa Depositi e Prestiti, member of the Accademia degli Incolti (1994-), member of the executive body of the Municipality of Rome (2006–2008).

He has been President of the Italy-USA Foundation, a non-profit organization based in Rome, Italy.

He was elected to the Italian Senate in 2008 and is a member of the Finance Committee.
