= Stefania Giannini =

Italian politician and linguist

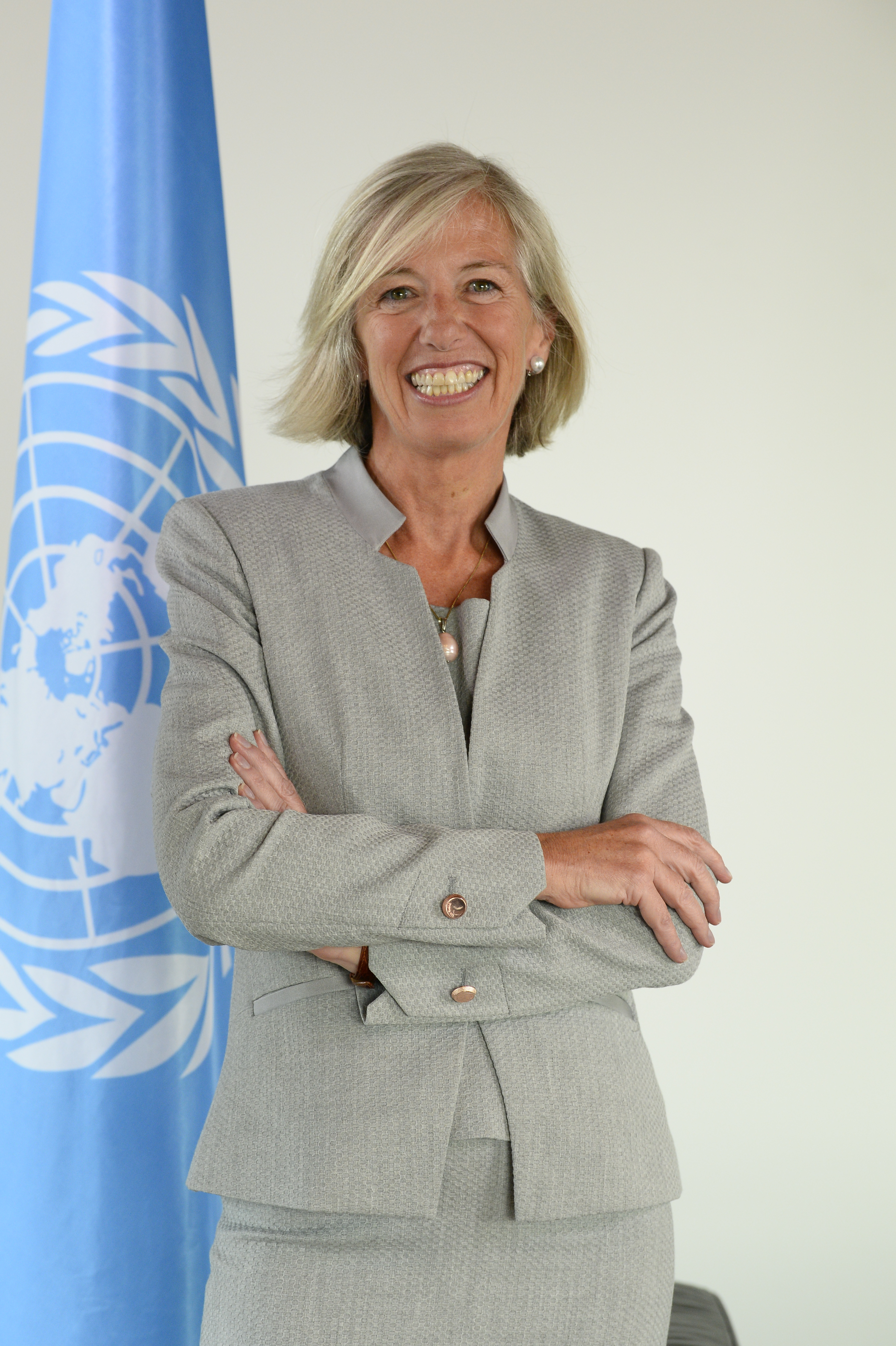

Minister of Education, Universities and Research
- In office 22 February 2014 – 12 December 2016
- Prime Minister: Matteo Renzi
- Preceded by: Maria Chiara Carrozza
- Succeeded by: Valeria Fedeli

Member of the Senate of the Republic
- In office 15 March 2013 – 23 March 2018
- Constituency: Tuscany

Personal details
- Born: 18 November 1960 (age 65) Lucca, Italy
- Party: PD (since 2015); SC (2013–2015)
- Children: 2
- Education: University of Pisa (degree); University of Pavia (PhD)

Stefania Giannini (born 18 November 1960) is an Italian politician and linguist. She served as Minister of Education, Universities and Research from 2014 until 2016. She is currently Assistant-Director General for Education at UNESCO in Paris.

== Early career ==
Born in Lucca, Giannini in 1991 became a professor at the University for Foreigners in Perugia, holding the chairs of Phonetics and Phonology (1992-1994), Sociolinguistics (1994-1998) and of Glottology and Linguistics (1998-2013). In 2004 she also became rector of the Perugia University for Foreigners. She was one of the first and youngest women to hold this position in Italy.

== Political career ==
As a candidate in Tuscany with the Civic Choice party of Mario Monti, Giannini was elected senator in February 2013. In November the same year, she was appointed secretary and coordinator of the party Scelta civica.

As Senator of the Republic of Italy between 2013 – 2018 and Minister of Education, Universities and Research (2014 – 2016), she developed and implemented a structural reform of the Italian education system, centred on social inclusion and cultural awareness.

On 21 February 2014, Giannini was appointed as Minister of Education, University and Research in the government of Prime Minister Matteo Renzi. During Italy's presidency of the Council of the European Union in 2014, she also chaired the Education and Competitiveness Council of the European Union. She was succeeded by Valeria Fedeli in 2016.

From 2017, Giannini served as adviser to the European Commissioner for Research and Innovation Carlos Moedas.

== Career with the United Nations ==
In 2018, UNESCO Director-General Audrey Azoulay appointed Giannini as one of four new members of the organization's senior management team. Giannini has since been serving as Assistant Director-General for Education, making her the top United Nations official in the field of education.

From 2022 to 2023, Giannini served on the European Space Agency's High-Level Advisory Group on Human and Robotic Space Exploration for Europe.

== Other activities ==
- Global Education Monitoring Report (GEM), Member of the Advisory Board
- Global Partnership for Education (GPE), Member of the Board of Directors

== Recognition ==
- 2008 – Honorary degree, awarded by the College Reges-Rede Gonzaga De Ensino Superior (Brazil)
- 2015 – America Award, presented by the Italy-USA Foundation

== Bibliography ==
- Tra grammatica e pragmatica: la geminazione consonantica in latino (Giardini, 1989)
- Percorsi metalinguistici. Giuliano di Toledo e la teoria della grammatica (FrancoAngeli, 1996)
- La pubblicità comparativa. Una via europea (FrancoAngeli, 1999)
- Il cambiamento linguistico. Suoni, forme, costrutti, parole (Carocci editore, 2003)
- La fonologia dell'interlingua. Principi e metodi di analisi (FrancoAngeli, 2003)

Political offices
Preceded by Maria Chiara Carrozza	Italian Minister of Education; 2014-2016	Succeeded by Valeria Fedeli
