= For Italy =

Centrist and Christian-democratic Italian parliamentary group

For Italy Per l'Italia
- Chamber: Italian Parliament (Chamber of Deputies and Senate)
- Foundation: 12 December 2013
- Dissolution: 22 March 2018
- Member parties: UdC, PpI, Demo.S, UpT
- Ideology: Christian democracy Christian left Centrism
- Political position: Centre

For Italy (Italian: Per l'Italia, PI) was the name of two centrist and mainly Christian-democratic parliamentary groups active in each house of the Italian Parliament: the Chamber of Deputies and the Senate of the Republic. The groups were launched on 12 December 2013 following a split from Civic Choice (SC), whose parliamentary groups included also the Union of the Centre (UdC). The Christian-democratic faction of SC, led by Mario Mauro, Lorenzo Dellai, Andrea Olivero, and Lucio Romano, left, along with the UdC, to form the PI groups.

In July 2014, Mauro's party, the Populars for Italy (PpI), suffered the split of its left wing, which formed Solidary Democracy (Demo.S), while remaining part of the joint parliamentary groups. Both Dellai and Romano, chairmen of the groups, joined the new party. The groups' composition was quite unstable as they experienced several splits. In October 2014, two deputies, who were once PpI members, left PI in order to join the Democratic Party (PD).

In November 2014, three deputies belonging to Democratic Centre (CD), joined the group in the Chamber, after having left the Mixed Group; the group was thus renamed "For Italy–Democratic Centre". Also in November, the three PpI senators left PI in order to join Great Autonomies and Freedom (GAL), a centre-right miscellaneous group. In December the three senators of Demo.S, including the group's leader Romano, left in order to join For the Autonomies (Aut), a miscellaneous regionalist and centre-left group, while the four remaining senators of PI (including the two affiliated to the UdC) and the six deputies of the UdC left in order to join Popular Area (AP), two newly formed groups led by the New Centre-Right (NCD).

After these movements, the PI group in the Chamber of Deputies was left with 13 deputies (8 Demo.S, 3 CD, and 2 PpI) and the one in the Senate of the Republic was effectively disbanded. In August 2015, Carmelo Lo Monte left the CD and PI in the Chamber of Deputies, while Maurizio Baradello joined Demo.S and PI the following September. In January 2015, the group changed its name to Solidary Democracy – Democratic Centre (Italian: Democrazia Solidale – Centro Democratico, DS–CD).

== Leadership ==
- Group Leader in the Chamber of Deputies: Lorenzo Dellai (2013–2018)
- Group Leader in the Senate: Lucio Romano (2013–2014)
