= Andrea Olivero =

Italian politician (born 1970)

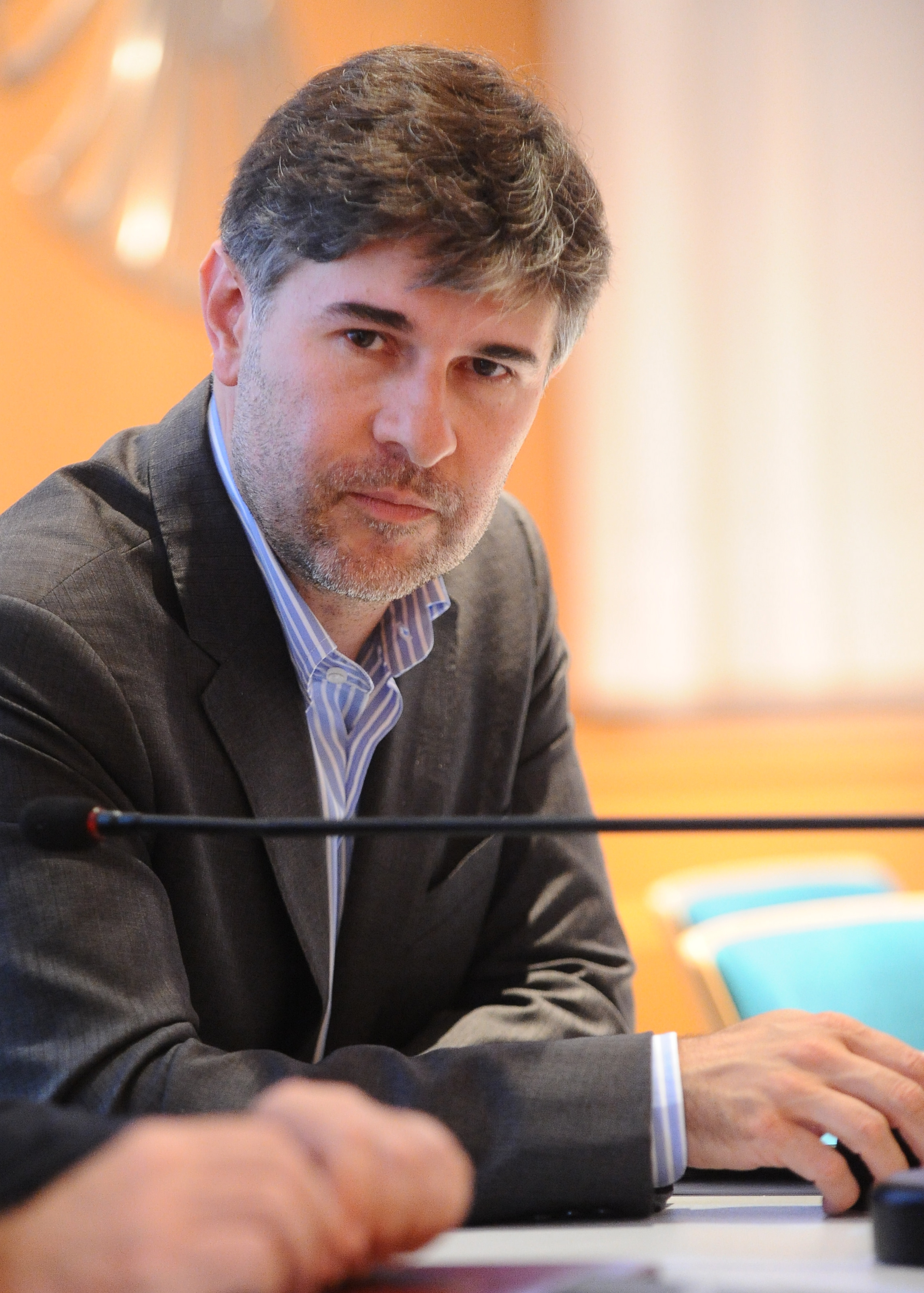
- Olivero in 1970

President of ACLI
- In office 23 February 2006 – 19 December 2012
- Preceded by: Luigi Bobba
- Succeeded by: Gianni Bottalico

Personal details
- Born: 24 February 1970 (age 55)
- Political party: Democrazia Solidale

Andrea Olivero (born 24 February 1970) is an Italian politician who has been Vice Minister for Agricultural, Food and Forestry Policies and a senator. He has been President of the Christian Associations of Italian Workers from 2006 to 2012.

== Biography ==
After graduating from the University of Turin, he became a teacher in the province of Cuneo. In 1992, he was one of the promoters of Christian Associations of Italian Workers (ACLI) of Cuneo in 1994 and promotes the establishment of the Emmaus Community of Boves. From 1997 to 2004, he was the President of ACLI Cuneo. In 2002, founder and president of Together to educate for the management of Catholic schools in the Diocese of Cuneo. In 2004, he was elected National Vice President ACLI, and since 2006 he was the president until his resignation on 19 December 2012, after the resignation of his predecessor Luigi Bobba. From December 2008, he acted as Spokesman of the Third Sector Forum.

== Political career ==
In 2013, he joined Civic Choice (SC). In the 2013 general election he was elected senator on With Monti for Italy coalition's lists, composed by SC, Union of the Centre (UdC) and Future and Freedom (FLI). On 12 March 2013, Mario Monti, SC acting president, appointed Olivero as provisional political coordinator of Civic Choice. At the first party congress held on 16 May 2013, he was re-elected SC coordinator.

Non-profit organization positions
| Preceded by Luigi Bobba | President of ACLI; 2006-2012 | Succeeded by Gianni Bottalico |
Party political offices
| New political party | Coordinator of the Civic Choice; 2013-present | Incumbent |
Italian Senate
| Preceded by Title jointly held | Senator for Constituency I – Piedmont I 2013-present | Incumbent |
