= Giuliano Poletti =

Italian politician (born 1951)

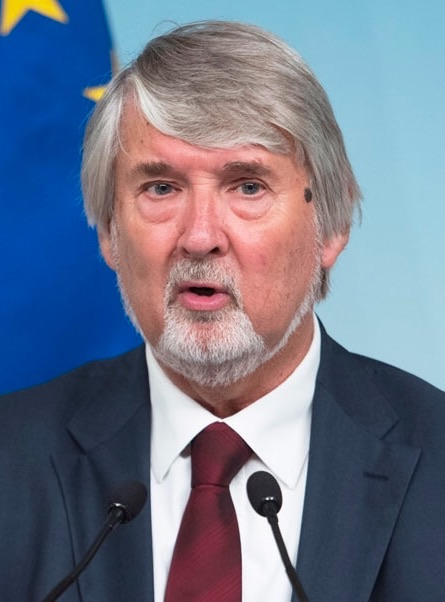

Minister of Labour and Social Policies
- In office 22 February 2014 – 1 June 2018
- Prime Minister: Matteo Renzi; Paolo Gentiloni
- Preceded by: Enrico Giovannini
- Succeeded by: Luigi Di Maio

President of Legacoop
- In office 12 December 2002 – 21 February 2014
- Preceded by: Luca Bernareggi
- Succeeded by: Mauro Lusetti

Personal details
- Born: 19 November 1951 (age 74) Imola, Italy
- Party: PCI (before 1991); PDS (1991–1998); Independent (1998–2017); PD (since 2017)
- Spouse: Anna Venturini
- Profession: Politician

Giuliano Poletti (Italian pronunciation: [dʒuˈljaːno poˈletti]; born 19 November 1951) is an Italian politician. He was appointed minister of labour and social policies on 22 February 2014 by Prime Minister Matteo Renzi, and also served in the cabinet of Paolo Gentiloni.

== Biography ==
Poletti was born in Imola, in the Province of Bologna, in 1951; his parents were farmers. During 1970s he attended the Agricultural Technical Institute of Imola.

He became a member of the Italian Communist Party and, from 1976 to 1979, he was appointed alderman for Agriculture and Productive Activities in his hometown.

He was later elected to the Provincial Council of Bologna for the Democratic Party of the Left, the heir of the Communist Party.

On 12 December 2002, Poletti was elected President of Legacoop, the main cooperative federation in Italy, which he led until 21 February 2014, when he was appointed Minister of Labour and Social Policies in the government of Matteo Renzi.

=== Minister of Labour ===
Poletti's ministry was characterized by the most important, but also controversial, labour market reform implemented in Italy in the last decades, the so-called Jobs Act.

On 12 March 2014, the Cabinet issued a law-decree on fixed-term contracts, called the Poletti Decree, as well as a bill proposing major reforms to the Italian labour market. A reduction in the tax burden of about €80 was announced for those earning less than €1,500 per month.

In September, the government brought the Jobs Act before Parliament, which provided for, among other things, the abolition of Article 18 of the Workers' Statute, which protected workers from unjustified dismissal. The proposal was heavily criticised by the largest Italian trade union, the General Confederation of Labour (CGIL) and its leaders Susanna Camusso and Maurizio Landini. Moreover, the left wing of the Democratic Party, by then led by the former National Secretary Pier Luigi Bersani, criticised the government for the reform, threatening to vote against it.

On 29 September, the National Committee of the Democratic Party voted to support the Jobs Act, despite the disagreements within the party, with 130 votes in favour, 20 against and 11 abstaining. On 9 October the Italian Senate voted to approve the Jobs Act, and the landmark reform passed with 165 votes in favour to 111 against, marking the first step for the most ambitious economic legislation of the eight-month-old government. Before the vote, Poletti was forced to cut his speech short due to the loud protests of the Five Star Movement and Lega Nord oppositions, some of whom threw coins and papers. German Chancellor Angela Merkel, who was visiting Milan and had been among the most vocal politicians regarding Italy's need for speedy economic reforms, said the labour law marked an "important step" to reduce "employment barriers" in the Eurozone's third-largest economy.

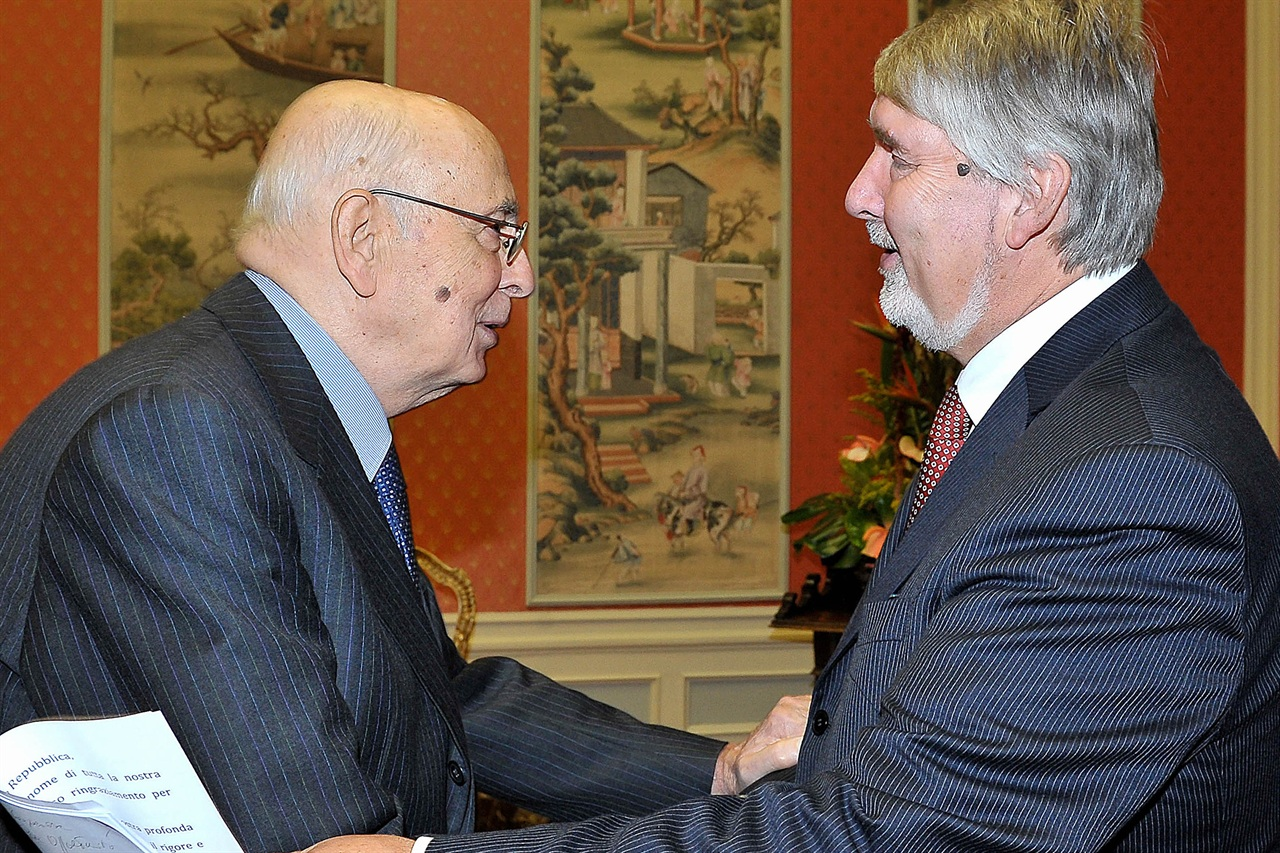
Giuliano Poletti with President Giorgio Napolitano.

On 25 October, almost one million people took part in a mass protest in Rome, organised by the CGIL in opposition to the labour reforms of the government. Some high-profile members of the left-wing faction of the Democratic Party, including Gianni Cuperlo, Stefano Fassina and Pippo Civati, also participated in the protest. On 8 November more than 100,000 public employees protested in Rome in a demonstration organised by the three largest trade unions in the country, the CGIL, the CISL and the UIL.

On 25 November, the Chamber of Deputies approved the Jobs Act with 316 votes, but the Five Star, Lega Nord and almost forty members of the Democratic Party abstained from the vote to protest against the reform. On 3 December, the Senate gave the Jobs Act the final approval it needed to become law.

On 12 December 2016, when Renzi resigned as Prime Minister after the constitutional referendum, Poletti was confirmed as Labour Minister by the new Prime Minister Paolo Gentiloni.

In 2017, after years as a left-wing independent politician, Poletti became a member of the Democratic Party.
