= Popular Italy =

Popular Italy (Italian: Italia Popolare, IP), whose complete name is Popular Italy – Movement for Europe (Italia Popolare – Movimento per l'Europa, IP–MpE), is a Christian-democratic faction within the Democratic Party. Its leading members were Lino Duilio, Gerardo Bianco and Alberto Monticone, all three MPs elected for Democracy is Freedom – The Daisy. They were the most sceptical group of that party about the merger with Democrats of the Left to form the Democratic Party, and they were cold supporters of it. Although being members of the Italian People's Party when this party decided to join The Olive Tree (Bianco was then party secretary), they were very proud of their Christian-democratic identity and never left the European People's Party.

Prior to the 2008 general election, the group joined the White Rose of Bruno Tabacci. Gerardo Bianco and Alberto Monticone were appointed Vice Presidents of the new party by President Savino Pezzotta and Secretary Mario Baccini. Only Lino Duilio remained member of the Democratic Party. Soon after Popular Italy left even the White Rose over disagreements on the composition of the electoral lists of the Union of the Centre (the alliance between the Union of Christian and Centre Democrats and the White Rose) and decided to again support the Democratic Party.

In 2017 Popular Italy joined the Popular Civic List (CP), a centrist electoral list within the centre-left coalition for the 2018 general election, along with Popular Alternative (AP), Italy of Values (IdV), the Centrists for Europe (CpE), Solidary Democracy (DemoS), the Union for Trentino (UpT), Italy Is Popular (IP) and minor parties/groups. CP obtained a mere 0.5% and no seats, except those of a few candidates who won in single-seat constituencies.
