= Popular Base =

Italian political party

Popular Base Base Popolare
- Abbreviation: BP
- President: Gian Mario Spacca
- Secretary: Giuseppe De Mita
- Founder: Giuseppe De Mita; Lorenzo Dellai; Mario Mauro; Dante Monda; Gaetano Quagliariello; Gian Mario Spacca; Francescomaria Tuccillo
- Founded: 19 July 2023; 3 years ago
- Headquarters: Rome
- Ideology: Christian democracy Popolarismo
- Political position: Centre
- European affiliation: European People's Party
- Colors: Blue and Gold
- Chamber of Deputies: 0 / 400
- Senate: 0 / 205
- European Parliament: 0 / 76
- Regional Councils: 1 / 896

Website
- basepopolare.com

Popular Base (Italian: Base Popolare) is a Christian-democratic political party in Italy.

== History ==
In July 2020 Ciriaco De Mita, the former prime minister, together with Giuseppe De Mita, leader of Italy Is Popular and Francescomaria Tuccillo, launched the ‘’Prospective Populars’’, that in 2021 became Populars in Network movement to attempt to federate the Italian populars into a single party. On 25 February 2023, on the same day that the national congress of Together was held, the Assembly of the regional promoters committees of Populars in Network met in Rome and launched a committee called POP - United Populars, with the aim of forming by the end of the year a political association that would bring together other popular political associations. POP, Together and other catholic associations signed on 27 February a manifesto called New Times – United Populars promoted by Giuseppe Fioroni, who left the PD following the election of Elly Schlein in the Democratic Party leadership election. In this manifesto the signatories pledge to work together while preserving the autonomy of their respective political parties. On 19 July, the Popular Base association was born from the POP promoting committee. On 24 September, in a meeting in Marina di Grosseto, the founders of Popular Base launched their official logo, joining the family of European People's Party with a video message sent by its Chairman Manfred Weber, and they announced the next steps leading up to the constituent assembly on 3 February 2024. On 21 February 2025, Popular Base was officially admitted as a member of the EPP. On 5 May, after the party decided to run with the centre-right coalition in the 2025 Marche regional election, several members left the party in disagreement with the decision. These included Fermo provincial coordinator and treasurer Stefano Cencetti, as well as the local party Populars for Ancona, which ended its federation with Popular Base. On 17 May, Cencetti launch a new party called New Marche - Base of Change, in support of Matteo Ricci's candidacy for the regional elections. On 25 July, the party agreed to run in the Marche regional election within Forza Italia's list, fielding five candidates, none of whom were elected.

== Election results ==
=== Regional Councils ===
Region	Election year	Votes	%	Seats	+/−	Status in legislature
Marche	2025	Into Forza Italia		0 / 31	0	No seats
