= Liberal Populars =

Liberal Populars Popolari Liberali
- Leader: Carlo Giovanardi
- Founded: 4 February 2008 (as political party)
- Dissolved: 29 March 2009 (merged into the PdL)
- Headquarters: Piazza di Pietra, 26; 00187 Rome
- Ideology: Christian democracy Social conservatism
- National affiliation: Union of Christian and Centre Democrats (2007–2008); The People of Freedom (2009–2013); New Centre-Right (2013–2015); Identity and Action (2015–present)

Website
- www.popolariliberali.it

The Liberal Populars (Popolari Liberali) were a short-lived Christian-democratic political party in Italy (2008–2009), which currently functions as an internal faction of Identity and Action (IdeA).

== History ==
Originally a faction within the Union of Christian and Centre Democrats (UDC), the PL were launched in February 2007 and named that way in October. Its leaders were Carlo Giovanardi and Emerenzio Barbieri, who wanted closer ties with Silvio Berlusconi's Forza Italia and the other parties of the House of Freedoms coalition, including Lega Nord. In April Giovanardi's bid to become secretary of the UDC had been supported by the 13.8% of the vote during a party congress.

When, on 18 November 2007, Berlusconi proposed the formation of The People of Freedom (PdL) party, Giovanardi suddenly hinted that he could leave UDC and join the new party. That finally happened on 4 February 2008, citing that the 72% of UDC voters would be interested in voting the PdL. UDC members who followed Giovanardi included Vito Bonsignore, Tomaso Zanoletti, Luigi Compagna, Giuseppe Galati, Francesco Lucchese, Alfredo Meocci and Francesco Massi. The PL were joined also by Riccardo Conti, a former UDC member who was then in Middle Italy. In early April PL announced an alliance, within the PdL, with Gianfranco Rotondi's Christian Democracy for Autonomies.

In the 2008 general election the party got two deputies and two senators elected in the PdL's lists. After the election, Giovanardi was appointed Undersecretary in the Berlusconi IV Cabinet.

On 29 March 2009 the party was merged into the PdL, during the first PdL's congress, and was converted into a faction.

On 15 November 2013 the PL left the PdL in order to join the newly formed New Centre-Right (NCD) party.

On 26 November 2015 the PL left the NCD. A month later the party joined Identity and Action (IdeA).
