= Italy Is Popular =

Italy Is Popular L'Italia è Popolare
- Leader: Giuseppe De Mita
- Founded: 11 November 2017
- Dissolved: March 2021
- Split from: Union of the Centre
- Merged into: Popolari in Rete (which in turn merged into Popular Base in July 2023)
- Ideology: Christian democracy Popularism
- Political position: Centre
- National affiliation: Electoral list: Popular Civic List; Coalition: Centre-left coalition

Website
- www.italiaepopolare.it

Italy Is Popular (Italian: L'Italia è Popolare, IP) was a Christian-democratic political party active in Italy.

== History ==
IP was launched as a split from the Union of the Centre (UdC) in November 2017 by Giuseppe De Mita, nephew of Ciriaco De Mita, a former leader of Christian Democracy and Prime Minister of Italy during 1980s. For the 2017 Sicilian regional election, the UdC re-joined the centre-right coalition at the regional level. Giuseppe De Mita criticised the decision, was relinquished as UdC's deputy secretary, and, along with his uncle Ciriaco and Marco Follini, launched IP.

In December, IP formed the Popular Civic List (CP), a centrist electoral list within the centre-left coalition, along with Popular Alternative (AP), Italy of Values (IdV), the Centrists for Europe (CpE), Solidary Democracy (DemoS), the Union for Trentino (UpT) and minor parties/groups. Minister of Health Beatrice Lorenzin was chosen as leader.

In the 2018 general election, CP obtained a mere 0.5% and no seats, except for a handful of elected in single-seat constituencies. De Mita was defeated in the single-seat constituency of Ariano Irpino, where he came third.

In March 2021, Giuseppe De Mita began work on the launch of Popolari in Rete, a movement founded with the aim of reuniting centrists who were formerly members of the Christian Democrats. On 19 July 2023, the Popular Base association was founded; its founders included Giuseppe De Mita, Gaetano Quagliariello, Mario Mauro, Francescomaria Tuccillo and Lorenzo Dellai.

== Election results ==
=== Italian Parliament ===
Election	Leader	Chamber of Deputies				Senate of the Republic			
Election	Leader	Votes	%	Seats	Position	Votes	%	Seats	Position
2018	Giuseppe De Mita	Into CP		0 / 630	13th	Into CP		0 / 315	13th
