= Populars' Coordination =

The Populars for the Constituent Assembly of the Centre (Popolari per la Costituente di Centro), later Populars' Coordination – Daisy for the Constituent Assembly of the Centre (Coordinamento Popolari – Margherita per la Costituente di Centro), was a Christian-democratic political party in Italy active in Campania, Italy. It was led by Ciriaco de Mita.

The Populars' party was one of the main constituent parties of the Union of the Centre in 2008, along with the Union of Christian and Centre Democrats and the White Rose.

== History ==
The party was founded in 2008 by Ciriaco De Mita, following the controversy with Walter Veltroni's Democratic Party about the lack of his candidacy in the 2008 general election. Consequentially, he stood as a candidate for the Union of the Centre (UdC) for the Senate in the 2008 general election. In the event he failed election, but, one year later, he managed to win a seat in the European Parliament for the UdC in the Southern constituency.

The party later merged with Clemente Mastella's UDEUR nucleus from Campania to give life to the Populars' Coordination – Daisy for the Constituent Assembly of the Centre (Coordinamento Popolari – Margherita per la Costituente di Centro).

The party took different names at the provincial level. In the province of Avellino, De Mita's heartland, the group in the provincial council was named The Populars – The Daisy for the Constituent Assembly of the Centre (I Popolari – La Margherita per la Costituente di Centro). In the province of Caserta the party was instead called Populars and Democrats for the Constituent Assembly of the Centre (Popolari e Democratici per la Costituente di Centro) or, simply, Democratic Populars (Popolari Democratici).

In the summer of 2008, the provincial councilors of Avellino belonging to the Populars (in contrast to the decision to entrust two departments of the provincial government to the Democratic Party) signed their resignations together with the centre-right councilors, effectively defying the provincial government chaired by Alberta De Simone. The provincial government was subsequently submitted to a commissioner.
