= Lorenzo Cesa =

Italian politician (born 1951)

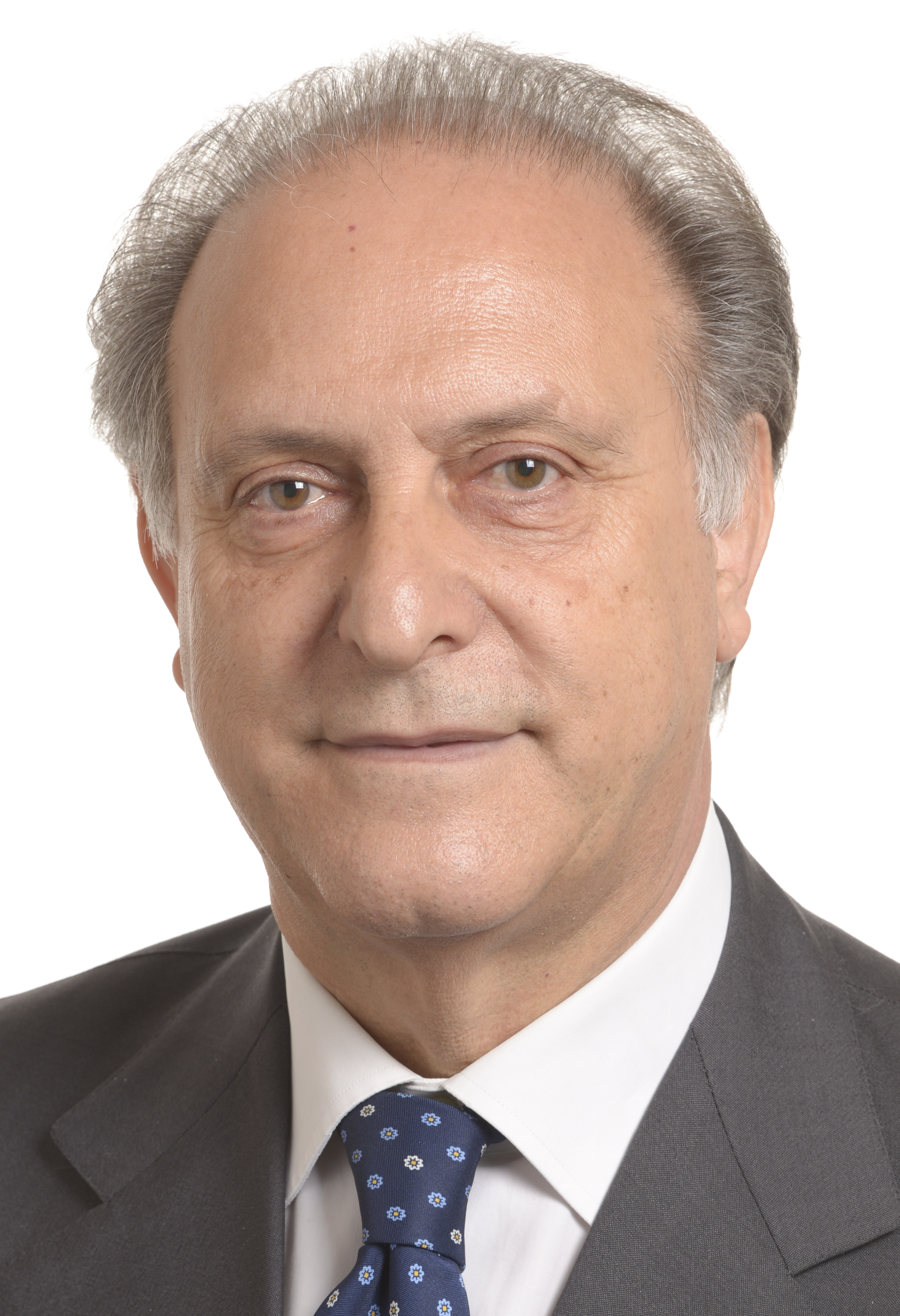

Secretary of the Union of the Centre
- Incumbent
- Assumed office 27 October 2005
- Preceded by: Marco Follini

Member of the European Parliament
- In office 1 July 2014 – 2 July 2019
- Constituency: Southern Italy
- In office 1 July 2004 – 27 April 2006
- Constituency: Southern Italy

Member of the Chamber of Deputies
- Incumbent
- Assumed office 13 October 2022
- Constituency: Molise
- In office 28 April 2006 – 25 June 2014
- Constituency: Rome

Personal details
- Born: 16 August 1951 (age 75) Arcinazzo Romano, Italy
- Party: Italian; Union of the Centre; EU; European People's Party
- Other political affiliations: Christian Democracy (until 1994); Christian Democratic Centre (1994–2002)
- Education: Luiss Guido Carli
- Website: www.lorenzocesa.eu

Lorenzo Cesa (born 16 August 1951) is an Italian politician and the current Secretary of the Union of the Centre.

== Biography ==
Cesa graduated in Political Science from the LUISS University in Rome. He was manager of important companies and banks, including ANAS.

He was elected Municipal Councillor of Rome with the Christian Democracy, and subsequently joined the Christian Democratic Centre and the Union of Christian and Centre Democrats.

In the 2004 European Parliament election Cesa was elected MEP with 103,000 preference votes.

On 27 October 2005 he was elected Secretary of the UDC, succeeding Marco Follini.

In the 2006 general election he was elected to the Chamber of Deputies, so he resigned as MEP. He was also re-elected MP in the 2008 and 2013 elections.

In the 2014 European Parliament election he was again elected MEP, among the ranks of the New Centre-Right – UDC. In the general election of 2018 he was a candidate for the Chamber of Deputies, in the uni-nominal college of Nola (with the support of the centre-right coalition) and in the relative proportional list (Us with Italy – UDC), but he was not elected, so kept the office as an MEP.

In the 2019 European election Cesa was candidate on the Forza Italia list, but he was not re-elected.

== Political proposals ==
Lorenzo Cesa proposed a Parliamentary Immunity to manage sex temptations allowing the Italian Parliament members' wives to get money from the Italian State to go in the city where their husbands work.

== Legal problems ==
Lorenzo Cesa was condemned on 21 June 2001 to 3 years of imprisonment for bribery with the Anas company.

In November 2010 Italian Authorities sequestered 1 million euro private goods from Lorenzo Cesa.
