= Carlo Giovanardi =

Italian politician (born 1950)

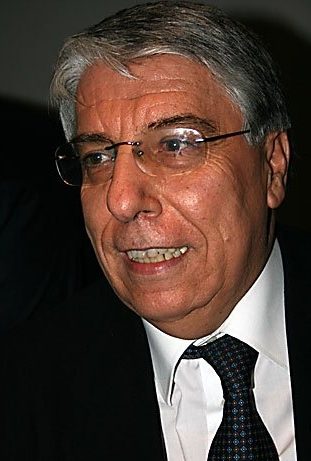

Member of the Senate of the Republic
- In office 29 April 2008 – 22 March 2018
- Constituency: Emilia-Romagna

Minister for Parliamentary Relations
- In office 11 June 2001 – 17 May 2006
- Preceded by: Patrizia Toia
- Succeeded by: Vannino Chiti

Member of the Chamber of Deputies
- In office 23 April 1992 – 28 April 2008
- Constituency: Emilia-Romagna

Personal details
- Born: 15 January 1950 (age 76) Modena, Italy
- Party: PpI (since 2015); NCD (2013–2015); PdL (2009–2013); PL (2008–2009); UDC (2002–2008); CCD (1994–2002); DC (before 1994)
- Height: 1.78 m (5 ft 10 in)
- Occupation: Politician, senator

Carlo Amedeo Giovanardi (born 15 January 1950) is an Italian politician. He is a former member of the Senate of the Republic and leader of the socially conservative wing of the New Centre-Right party.

== Political career ==
Born in Modena, Giovanardi graduated in jurisprudence and did his military service in the Carabinieri. His political experience began in 1969, when he joined the Christian Democracy party (DC). His first elected position was as a Municipal Councilor in Modena, followed by that of Christian Democrat in the Regional Council of the Emilia Romagna. In 1992, he was elected as a member of the Chamber of Deputies and in the successive legislature on the Christian Democrat list. Subsequently, he became an exponent and founding member of the Christian Democratic Centre (CCD).

Giovanardi has been President of the parliamentary group of the Christian Democratic Centre and Vice President of the Chamber of Deputies. In the 2001 Italian Elections, Giovanardi was elected Deputy representing Lecco for Silvio Berlusconi's centre-right coalition House of Freedoms, as part of the Union of Christian and Centre Democrats (UDC). From 11 June 2001, until May 2006, he was Minister for Parliamentary Affairs, in Berlusconi's second and third governments.

In the 2006 Italian general election, Giovanardi became Deputy representing the Veneto-2 constituency. He is President of the Committee for the Authorizations and President of the Parliamentary Committee for accusation procedures. He is also member of the Institutional Transactions Commission of the Chamber of Deputies. Giovanardi and Emerenzio Barbieri were the leaders of one of the four factions in the Union of Christian and Centre Democrats, who want closer ties with Forza Italia and the other parties of the House of Freedoms coalition, including the Lega Nord. In the III National Congress, 13.8% of the delegates supported Giovanardi's candidacy for the leadership.

In 2008, Giovanardi left the UDC to start the short-lived Liberal Populars party, which merged into the broad centre-right party, The People of Freedom (PdL). He served as Undersecretary with delegation to family policies, the fight against drugs and the civil service in the Berlusconi IV Cabinet from 2008 to 2011. After the split of PdL in 2013, Giovanardi joined the New Centre-Right party.

== Controversies ==
=== Cremonini case ===
On Sunday, 13 November 2005, a TV program report by Milena Gabanelli on Rai Tre said that the Italian company Cremonini had produced tinned meat that resulted in the death of a 12-year-old boy in Moscow because of food poisoning, and that the Cuban government had rejected Cremonini tinned meat made in Italy because it was in a bad condition. Carlo Giovanardi commented on the programme saying:

"I was amazed at the way that the Report program tried to destroy the image of a great Italian company like Inalca of Modena… from the resurrection of the fear that consumers have for the mad cow, to the supplies from abroad, from the collapse of other companies, to the malicious connection of single episodes, everything has been lumped together to criminalize the companies in the group. The economic and moral damage for the company, and for our country, risk being incalculable: we’ll have to see who benefits from these programs, who suggested them, and who thinks they will profit financially on the national and international market by weakening a dangerous competitor that could support world competition."

Inalca contributed to Giovanardi's electoral campaign in 2006.

=== Radio24 interview ===
In late December 2005, during an interview on Radio 24, he said, "I am not employee of nobody if not of my constituents," and "in democracy everyone answers to his ideas and the constituents who have voted it." This was criticized by commentator Beppe Grillo because Article 67 of the Italian constitution, says that "every member of the parliament represents the nation and exercises its functions without mandate tie."

=== Drug legislation ===
In January 2006, the "Legge Fini-Giovanardi" (Fini-Giovanardi law) was approved. The law, developed with colleague Gianfranco Fini, restricted the use of recreational drugs, especially cannabis, and greatly increased punishments for consumers of them.

In May 2008, in an interview at the website of the Club of Freedom, Giovanardi said, "We say enough to the drug culture, and in order to do that, we want to introduce a rule preventing propaganda, even indirect, to all drugs, including so-called 'light drugs' […] In addition, to insist on prevention and education and to have asked prefects and Quaestors to monitor and act with determination against these irresponsible initiatives, we are committed to find the most appropriate regulatory tools aimed to avoid that propaganda events, such as three days in Bologna on hemp can be held freely."

=== LGBT rights ===
Carlo Giovanardi has become famous for his positions against LGBT people; he has been accused of being a homophobe.

On 20 September 2010, Giovanardi stated that countries that have legalized adoptions of children by gay couples have "exploded the sale of boys and girls".

On 23 April 2011, Giovanardi argued against gay-friendly advertising by the Swedish company IKEA, declaring: "The term 'family' is used by multinational detrimental to the Italian Constitution, because it is meant only one formed by the marriage between man and woman." Ikea replies: "That founded on marriage is one of the families. We appeal to all types."

In February 2012, during an interview with Radio 24, he likened a kiss between women in the audience to a person who "pees on the street". This elicited immediate reactions by some politicians, such as Rosy Bindi, who said "Giovanardi never ceases to amaze for his lack of modesty and balance and for its smallness" and Paola Concia, who launched a mail bomb, suggesting: "Write to him that homophobia is a disease."

Giovanardi say in a 25 January 2013 interview that during World War II there were a few discriminations against gay people, not a real Holocaust".

On 21 January 2014, he introduced an amendment to protect any sexual orientation, not only homosexual and bisexual but also heterosexual, and also included pedophilia. The Five Star Movement announced its intention to report the matter to the Council of Europe. He later said that he mistakenly entered the term "pedophilia" in the text, and meant to use "pedofobia."

In an episode of Porta a Porta on 25 January 2014, in response to a request made to him by Bruno Vespa, he tells how his daughter went to South Africa and became engaged to a black man, a rasta, perhaps gay, and in addition, married to another man. Giovanardi says he was shocked by this news from his daughter.

=== Giovanardi in judgement ===
On 10 April 2017, Giovanardi was investigated "for revelation and use of official secrets and threat or violence to a political, administrative or judicial body of the State. With the aggravation of having strengthened the mafia association, facilitating it".

=== Dutch euthanasia laws ===
In a radio program aired on Rai Radio 1 on 17 March 2006, he said: "Nazi legislation and Hitler's ideas are re-emerging in Europe via Dutch euthanasia laws and the debate on how to kill ill children". He added that it is eugenics to debate killing children "who are ill or have Down Syndrome", and that "we could just as easily apply this to senior citizens". The Dutch prime minister called Giovanardi's comments "scandalous and unacceptable".

Italian Chamber of Deputies
Preceded by Title jointly held	Deputy for Lecco; 2001–2006	Succeeded by Title jointly held
Preceded by Title jointly held	Deputy for Veneto 2; 2006–2008	Succeeded by Title jointly held
Italian Senate
Preceded by Title jointly held	Senator for Emilia-Romagna; 2008 – present	Succeeded by Title jointly held
Political offices
Preceded by Patrizia Toia	Minister of Relations with Parliament; 2001–2006	Succeeded by Vannino Chiti
Preceded by Fabio Gobbo, Enrico Letta, Ricardo Franco Levi, Enrico Micheli	Undersecretary to the Prime Minister; 2008 – present Served alongside: Maurizio Balocchi, Paolo Bonaiuti, Michela Vittoria Brambilla, Aldo Brancher, Gianfranco Miccichè	Incumbent
