= New Times – United Populars =

Italian Christian democracy political party

New Times – United Populars Tempi Nuovi – Popolari Uniti
- Abbreviation: TN
- National Coordinator: Giuseppe Fioroni
- Founded: 27 February 2023; 3 years ago
- Split from: Democratic Party
- Headquarters: Via Accademia degli Agiati, 130; 00147 Rome
- Ideology: Christian democracy
- Political position: Centre
- European affiliation: European Democratic Party
- Colors: Blue
- Chamber of Deputies: 0 / 400
- Senate: 0 / 205
- European Parliament: 0 / 76
- Regional Councils: 0 / 896

Website
- piattaformapopolare.net

New Times – United Populars (Italian: Tempi Nuovi – Popolari Uniti), also known as New Times – Popular Platform (Italian: Tempi Nuovi – Piattaforma Popolare), is a Christian-democratic political party in Italy.

== History ==
Following the approval of the new Democratic Party Manifesto on 21 January 2023, promoted by resigning leader Enrico Letta and the leader of Article One Roberto Speranza, leadership candidate Stefano Bonaccini criticized the party's leftward turn, as did former minister Giuseppe Fioroni. After the approval of the new Manifesto, Speranza announced that Article One would take part in the PD leadership election. With Elly Schlein's victory in the leadership election against Bonaccini, Fioroni on 27 February announced his willingness to leave the Democratic Party he had founded in 2007, and founded New Times – Popular Platform. The manifesto involved the participation of other Catholic movements such as Together and POP – United Populars. In this manifesto the signatories pledge to work together while preserving the autonomy of their respective political parties. On 14 July in Rome, they announced the party's logo and the name change to New Times – United Populars. On 13 October, the party was admitted to the European Democratic Party.

They endorsed Letizia Moratti (candidate for Forza Italia) in the 2024 European Parliament election in Italy.

== Election results ==
=== European Parliament ===
| Election | Leader | Votes | % | Seats | +/– | EP Group |
|---|---|---|---|---|---|---|
| 2024 | Giuseppe Fioroni | Into FI–NM | | 0 / 76 | New | – |
