= Centrists for Europe =

Italian political party

Centrists for Europe Centristi per l'Europa
- Leader: Pier Ferdinando Casini
- Coordinator: Gianpiero D'Alia
- Founded: 6 December 2016; 9 years ago (launched); 11 February 2017; 9 years ago (founded)
- Split from: Union of the Centre
- Ideology: Christian democracy Pro-Europeanism
- Political position: Centre
- National affiliation: Centre-left coalition
- Chamber of Deputies: 0 / 400
- Senate: 1 / 200 (Within PD-IDP) (Note: Pier Ferdinando Casini is a member.)
- European Parliament: 0 / 76
- Regional Councils: 0 / 896

Centrists for Europe (Italian: Centristi per l'Europa; CpE) is a Christian-democratic political party in Italy. The party was launched, as Centrists for Italy (Italian: Centristi per l'Italia; CpI), by splinters from the Union of the Centre in December 2016 and officially founded, with its final name, in February 2017. Pier Ferdinando Casini is the incumbent leader of the party.

== History ==
In the run-up of the 2016 Italian constitutional referendum, the Union of the Centre (UdC) chose to campaign for "No", while the New Centre-Right, the UdC's counterpart in Popular Area (AP), was among the keenest supporters of "Yes".

After the referendum, which saw a huge defeat of the "Yes" side, the UdC left AP altogether. However, some UdC splinters, notably including Pier Ferdinando Casini, Gianpiero D'Alia (who had previously launched Centrists for Sicily) and minister Gian Luca Galletti, launched "Centrists for Italy" and confirmed their alliance with the NCD within Popular Area.

The party was officially founded, with the current name, in February 2017. At the time the CpE included one minister (Galletti, who had been confirmed in the Gentiloni Cabinet in December), two deputies (D'Alia and Ferdinando Adornato) and three senators (Casini, Aldo Di Biagio and Luigi Marino). Also former minister Francesco D'Onofrio joined the party.

In December 2017, the CpE launched the Popular Civic List (CP), within the centre-left coalition, along with Popular Alternative (AP), Italy of Values (IdV), Solidary Democracy (DemoS), the Union for Trentino (UpT), Italy Is Popular (IP) and minor parties/groups. The new leader of AP, Beatrice Lorenzin, was chosen as leader of the list too.

In the 2018 Italian general election, CP obtained a mere 0.5% of the vote, far below the electoral thresholds, but Casini was re-elected to the Senate from a single-seat constituency in Bologna, thanks to the decisive support of the Democratic Party and the centre-left coalition. After the election, Casini sat with the heterogenous For the Autonomies group.

=== Later developments ===
After not taking part in the 2018 regional elections in Molise and those in Friuli-Venezia Giulia, the party presented itself in the 2019 regional elections in Abruzzo with its own list in support of the centre-left candidate Giovanni Legnini, receiving 1.53% and no seats. In the 2019 Lucanian elections, CpE presented itself in a united list with Centro Democratico in support of the centre-left candidate Carlo Trerotola, collecting 3.30% without electing any councillors.

However, the party didn't ran in the 2019 European parliamentary elections but Casini declared his support for the Partito Democratico-Siamo Europei list.

During the 2022 election, the party entered the Democratic Party – Democratic and Progressive Italy list, part of the centre-left coalition with Casini who was re-elected in the single-member constituency of Bologna.

== Electoral results ==
=== Italian Parliament ===
Election	Leader	Chamber of Deputies				Senate of the Republic			
Election	Leader	Votes	%	Seats	+/–	Votes	%	Seats	+/–
2018	Pier Ferdinando Casini	Into CP		0 / 630	New	Into CP		1 / 315	New
2022	Pier Ferdinando Casini	Into PD–IDP		0 / 400	0	Into PD–IDP		1 / 200	0

=== Regional Councils ===
Region	Election year	Votes	%	Seats	+/−
Sicily	2017	80,366 (10th) (Note: In a joint list with AP.)	4.2	0 / 70	–
Abruzzo	2019	7,839 (13th)	1.3	0 / 31	–
