= Liberal Foundation =

Italian political foundation

The Liberal Foundation (Fondazione Liberal), since 2009 called Liberal-Popular Foundation (Fondazione Liberal-Popolare), was a foundation led by Ferdinando Adornato that represented the conservative, liberal, secular and Catholic wing of the Union of the Centre.

The foundation was organized on the territory through the Liberal Clubs (Circoli Liberal).

== History ==
It was founded in 1995 by Ferdinando Adornato and Ernesto Galli della Loggia, as a liberal-democratic inspiration foundation that bridged between the left opposition (formed by the Democratic Party of the Left) and that of the Centre (composed by the Italian People's Party), to build a new alternative to the Centre-right coalition of Silvio Berlusconi.

The first steering committee included: Ferdinando Adornato, Antonio Baldassarre, Augusto Antonio Barbera, Rodolfo Brancoli, Carlo Azeglio Ciampi, Franco Debenedetti, Diego Della Valle, Ernesto Galli della Loggia, Alfio Marchini, Mino Martinazzoli, Vittorio Merloni, Angelo Panebianco, Sergio Romano, Cesare Romiti, Giorgio Rumi and Marco Tronchetti Provera. The official organ of the foundation was the monthly "Liberal".

In 1998, Galli della Loggia left «Liberal» and the foundation, at the behest of its president Adornato, gradually approached the centre-right coalition, up to the adhesion of the same Adornato to Forza Italia. The monthly "Liberal" aimed to adapt American Conservatism in Italian political system, with a careful look especially at the neoconservatism, theoconservatism, and processing the so-called "theoliberalism". Adornato used the foundation as a means of establishing the "House of Moderates", the single party of the Italian centre-right, with the merge of Forza Italia, National Alliance and Union of Christian and Centre Democrats. However, when Berlusconi announcedin 2007 The People of Freedom, Adornato refused to join it, stating that this was not the unitary project he was working on but was rather a restyling of Forza Italia.

Adornato and its Liberal Foundation thus joined the Union of the Centre, representing its conservative and liberal wing.
