= Middle Italy =

Middle Italy may refer to:

- Central Italy, the central region of Italy
- Middle Italy (political party), a defunct minor centrist political party in Italy
