= Promoters of Freedom =

Promoters of Freedom (Promotori della Libertà) was an official grassroots organisation within The People of Freedom, a political party in Italy.

The organisation was launched by Silvio Berlusconi on 24 January 2010 and its leader is Michela Vittoria Brambilla, responsible of movement organization of the party and leader of the Clubs of Freedom. The Circles continue to be active through Promoters of Freedom, but are not completely dependent from the party, while the Promoters are a direct emanation of it.

Sandro Bondi was appointed by Brambilla as responsible for Culture and Formation of the Promoters. Regional representatives of the organization include Giancarlo Galan (Veneto), Renzo Tondo (Friuli-Venezia Giulia), Michele Scandroglio (Liguria), Fiammetta Modena (Umbria) and Gianni Chiodi (Abruzzo).
