= Armando Dionisi =

Italian politician (born 1949)

Armando Dionisi (born 11 October 1949 in Canterano) is an Italian politician, and was elected to the Italian Chamber of Deputies in the 2006 General election.

Previously he was a Member of the European Parliament for the Central region with the Cristiani Democratici Uniti, Member of the Bureau of the European People's Party and sat on the European Parliament's Committee on Transport and Tourism.

He was a substitute for the Committee on Agriculture and Rural Development, a member of the Delegation for relations with the Mashreq countries and a substitute for the Delegation for relations with the Maghreb countries and the Arab Maghreb Union (including Libya).

== Career ==
- 1992-1993: Regional Vice-Secretary of Democrazia Cristiana - Lazio
- 1998-2002: Regional Secretary of the CCD
- since 2002: Regional Secretary of the UDC and member of the national executive

== Education ==
- from 1988 to 1990: Director of Coldiretti (farmers' association) of Rome from 1982 to 1990 and Mayor of Canterano
- 1994: From 1990 to 1995 member of Lazio Regional Council and member of Regional Executive with responsibility for staff and labour policy
- from 2000 to 2004: Member of the Lazio Regional Executive with responsibility for town planning and housing
- Head of the UDC-SVP delegation in the EPP-ED Group in the European Parliament

== See also ==
- 2004 European Parliament election in Italy
