= Patrizia Toia =

Italian politician (born 1950)

Patrizia Toia MEP
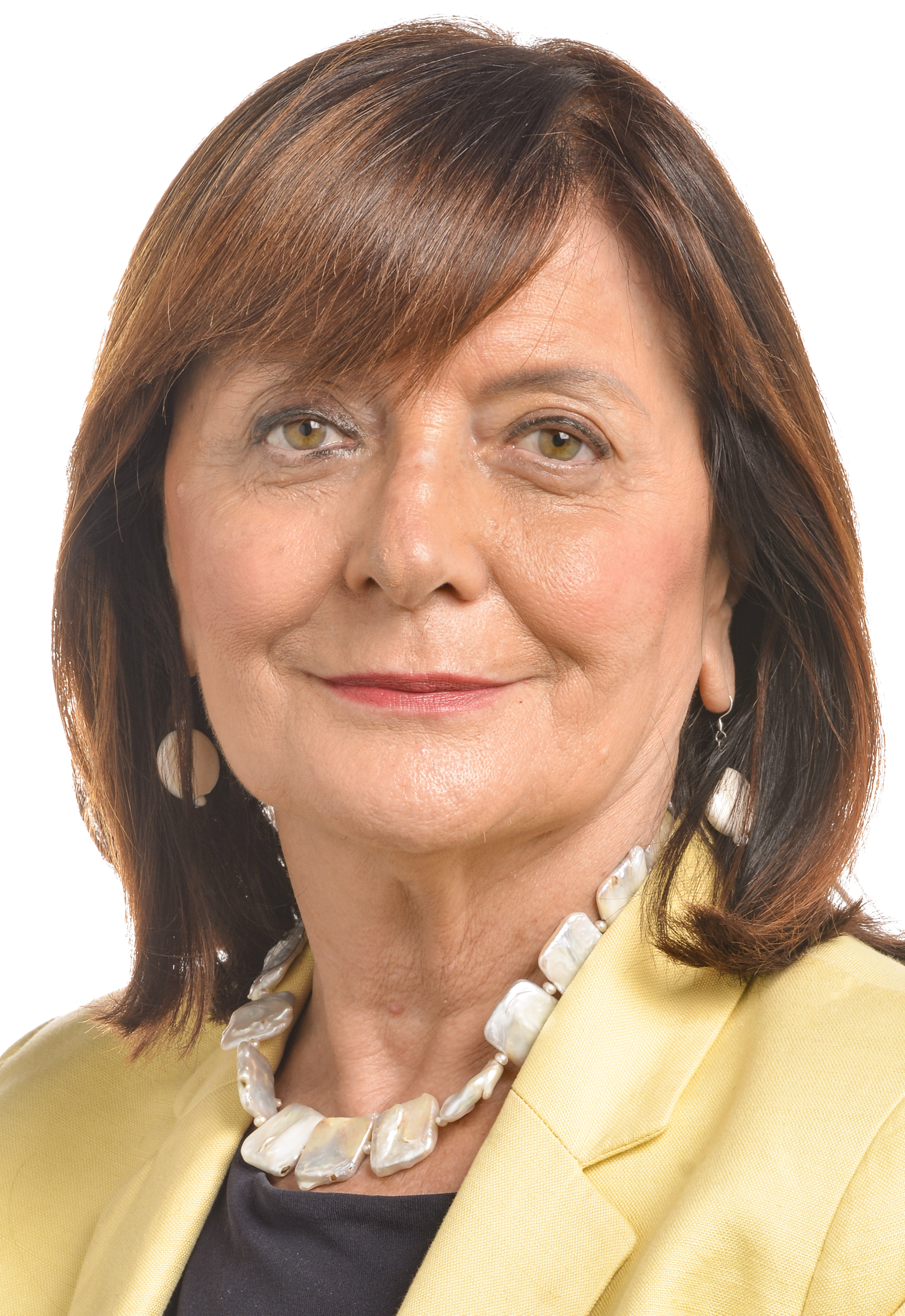

Member of European Parliament for Italy
- Incumbent
- Assumed office 13 June 2004

Minister for European Affairs
- In office 22 December 1999 – 26 April 2000
- Prime Minister: Massimo D'Alema
- Preceded by: Enrico Letta
- Succeeded by: Gianni Francesco Mattioli

Minister for Parliamentary Relations
- In office 26 April 2000 – 11 June 2001
- Prime Minister: Giuliano Amato
- Preceded by: Agazio Loiero
- Succeeded by: Carlo Giovanardi

Member of the Chamber of Deputies
- In office 29 June 1995 – 8 May 1996

Member of the Senate
- In office 8 May 1996 – 13 June 2004

Personal details
- Born: 17 March 1950 (age 76) Pogliano Milanese, Italy
- Party: DC (1975–1994); PPI (1994–2002); DL (2002–2007); PD (since 2007)
- Education: University of Milan
- Occupation: Political scientist

Patrizia Toia (born 17 March 1950) is an Italian politician and member of the European Parliament for North-West with Democratic Party, part of the group of the Progressive Alliance of Socialists and Democrats.

== Education ==
- Graduate in political science (Università degli Studi, Milan)
- Specialised in strategic planning (Bocconi University, Milan)
- Managerial post at Executive Committee of the Lombardy Region
- Member of the federal executive and 'La Margherita' provincial party coordinator for Milan

== Career ==
- 1975-1985: Municipal Councillor of Vanzago (Milan)
- 1994-1995: Member of Lombardy Regional Council (1985–1995), Member of Regional Executive with responsibility for coordination of social services (1989–1990), health (1990–1991) and the budget
- 1995-1996: Member of the Chamber of Deputies of Italy
- 1996-2001: Under-Secretary of State for Foreign Affairs, Minister for Community Policies, Minister for Relations with Parliament
- 1996-2004: Senator

== Member of the European Parliament ==
In the European Parliament, Toia serves on the Committee on Industry, Research and Energy. In this capacity, she is the Parliament's rapporteur on the introduction of 5G. Since 2021, she has been part of the Parliament's delegation to the Conference on the Future of Europe.

Toia is also a substitute for the Committee on Employment and Social Affairs, a member of the Delegation to the EU-Chile Joint Parliamentary Committee and a substitute for the Delegation to the EU-Mexico Joint Parliamentary Committee.

In addition to her committee assignments, Toia is a member of the MEP Heart Group (sponsored by the European Heart Network (EHN) and the European Society of Cardiology (ESC)), a group of parliamentarians who have an interest in promoting measures that will help reduce the burden of cardiovascular diseases (CVD), and the MEPs Against Cancer group. She is also a member of the European Parliament Intergroup on Cancer; the European Parliament Intergroup on Integrity (Transparency, Anti-Corruption and Organized Crime); the European Parliament Intergroup on Extreme Poverty and Human Rights; and of the European Parliament Intergroup on Children's Rights.

== See also ==
- 2004 European Parliament election in Italy
