= Renato Balduzzi =

Italian academic and politician

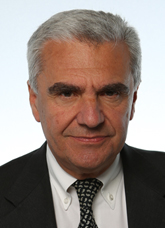

Minister of Health
- In office 16 November 2011 – 28 April 2013
- President: Giorgio Napolitano
- Prime Minister: Mario Monti
- Preceded by: Ferruccio Fazio
- Succeeded by: Beatrice Lorenzin

Member of the Chamber of Deputies
- In office 15 March 2013 – 26 September 2014

Member of the High Council of the Judiciary
- In office 15 settembre 2014 – 15 September 2018

Personal details
- Party: Civic Choice
- Education: University of Genoa

Renato Balduzzi (born 12 February 1955) is an Italian academic and politician. He served as the Italian minister of health under Prime Minister Mario Monti from November 2011 to April 2013.

== Early life ==
Renato Balduzzi was born on 12 February 1955 in Voghera, Italy.

== Career ==
Prior to becoming minister, Balduzzi was a professor of constitutional law in the Università Cattolica del Sacro Cuore. He taught at the various universities, including University of Eastern Piedmont, the University of Genoa, the University of Turin, Paris 12 Val de Marne University, the University of the South, Toulon-Var, and Paul Cézanne University Aix-Marseille III.

On 16 November 2011, Balduzzi was named minister of health in the Mario Monti's technocratic government. In 2013, he joined Civic Choice (SC), Monti's new-founded party. In the Italian general election of 25 February 2013, he was elected deputy on With Monti for Italy coalition's lists, electoral district 2 in region Piedmont. Balduzzi's term as health minister ended on 28 April 2013 and Beatrice Lorenzin replaced him in the post.

== Personal life ==
Balduzzi is married, and he has three children.

== Honors ==
- Medaglia teresiana, University of Pavia, (2012)
