= Alessandro Picardi =

Italian manager (born 1977)

- Born: 1977 (age 48–49)
- Occupation: Manager
- Spouse: Beatrice Lorenzin (m. 2016)
- Children: 2

Alessandro Picardi (born 1977) is an Italian manager.

== Biography ==
Alessandro Picardi is an executive manager. He has gained extensive experience across the telecommunications, television broadcasting, finance, energy, and automotive sectors as in the role of Chief of Corporate Affairs of Renault Group Mobilize Italy. Actually is Chairman of VL Capital, a company of investments for private equity and ventures capital and strategic consulting with important skills in M&A. Picardi is also President of the Control and Risk Committee, of the Ethic Officer and board member of Acea, a multiutility company of energy, water and environment. Picardi is also member of General Council of Confindustria and is Vice President of Confindustria Assolombarda, board member of Confindustria Legal and Olimpic Committee, Ambassador of Croce Rossa and is President of Nexting. He was President of Finlombarda gestioni Sgr, an asset management company of funds of Private Equity and Ventures Capital. Picardi is a former president executive of Olivetti, Executive Vice President of Telecom Italia, the Chief Public Affairs Officer in the TIM Group from 2019 to 2023, former President of Tivù Sat, and former president of the Digital Single Market as vice president of Confindustria Digitale, Vice President of Asstel and founder and member of the General Council of Confindustria Radio Televisioni. Until January 2019 he was director of Strategic Development of Rai platforms, director of the Institutional and International Relations from 2013 to October 2016, and board member of Auditel from 2015 to 2018.

Graduating in media studies from Rome, Picardi is also a journalist registered in the national list of publicists, member of executive board of Sparkle and ISPI Institute for International Political Studies.

As vice president of Corporate Affairs of Alitalia from 2012 to 2013, Alessandro Picardi has a consolidated experience in the field of telecommunications: he was the head of Institutional Affairs at Wind Telecomunicazioni from December 2006 to August 2012, and worked as a member of the Institutional Affairs and Relations with the Vatican of Sky Italy from 2004 to November 2006.

He was chairman of the Fondazione Ugo Bordoni committee, a culture and research institute with a tradition of research and application studies in the fields of telecommunications and information technology. Picardi was also a short-term board member of the L’Orientale University of Naples. He was also in the board of directors of Assaereo and Asstel.

== Private life ==
Alessandro Picardi has been married to Beatrice Lorenzin, former Italian health minister, since September 2016. He is the father of Francesco and Lavinia.
