= Lanzo Torinese =

Lanzo Torinese Lans (Piedmontese) Lans (Arpitan)
- Comune
- Città di Lanzo Torinese
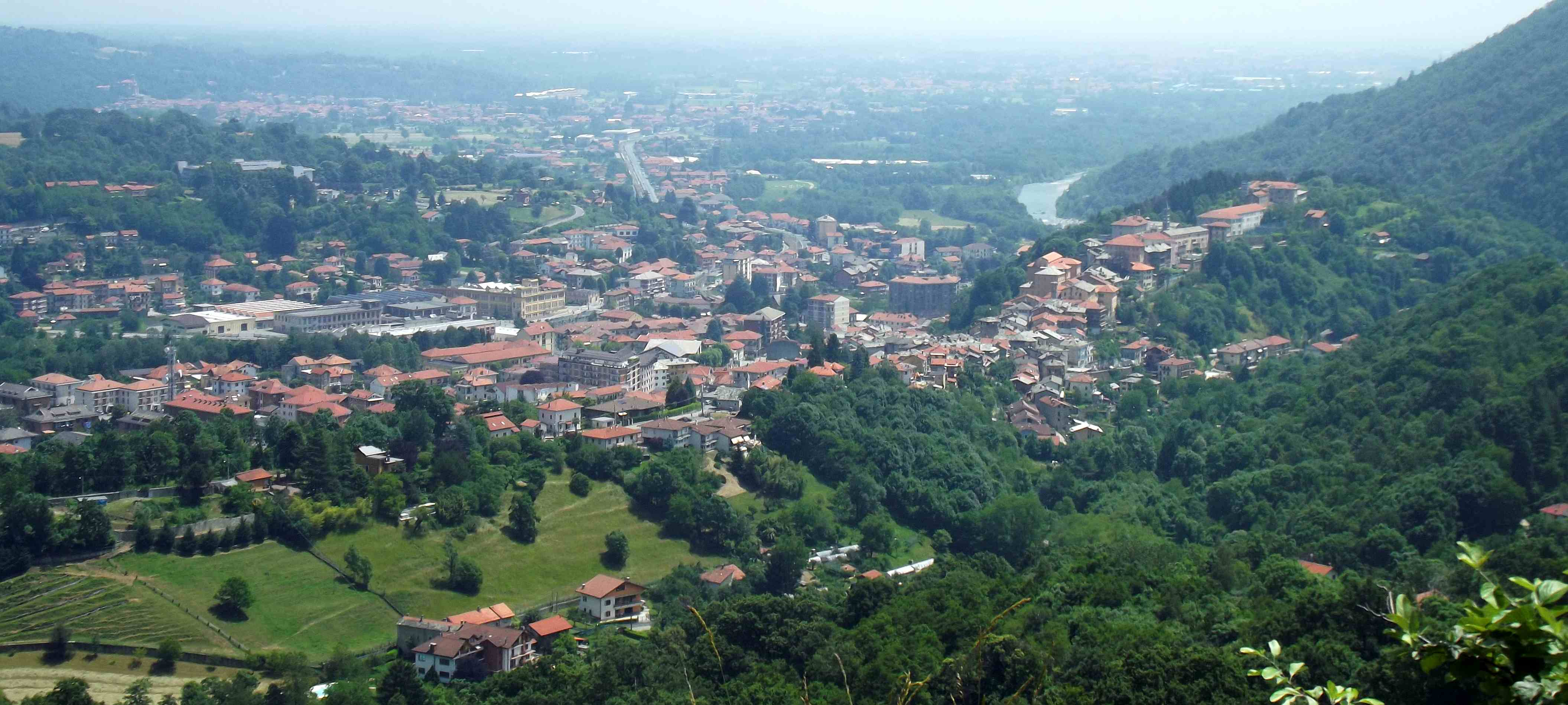

- Coat of arms

- Location within Italy Location within Piedmont
- Coordinates: 45°16′N 7°29′E
- Country: Italy
- Region: Piedmont
- Metropolitan city: Turin (TO)
- Frazioni: Oviglia, Fua, Ovairo, Brecco, Momello, Praile, Margaula, Colombaro, Grange

Government
  - Mayor: Ernestina Assalto

Area
  - Total: 10.4 km^{2} (4.0 sq mi)
- Elevation: 525 m (1,722 ft)

Population (30 September 2014)
  - Total: 5,133
  - Density: 494/km^{2} (1,280/sq mi)
- Demonym: Lanzesi
- Time zone: UTC+1 (CET)
  - Summer (DST): UTC+2 (CEST)
- Postal code: 10074
- Dialing code: 0123
- Patron saint: St. Peter in Vinculis
- Saint day: 1 August
- Website: Official website

Lanzo Torinese (Lans in Piedmontese and arpitan) is a comune (municipality) in the Metropolitan City of Turin, region of Piedmont, northwestern Italy. It is located about 30 kilometres (19 mi) northwest of Turin at the mouth of the Valli di Lanzo.

== History ==
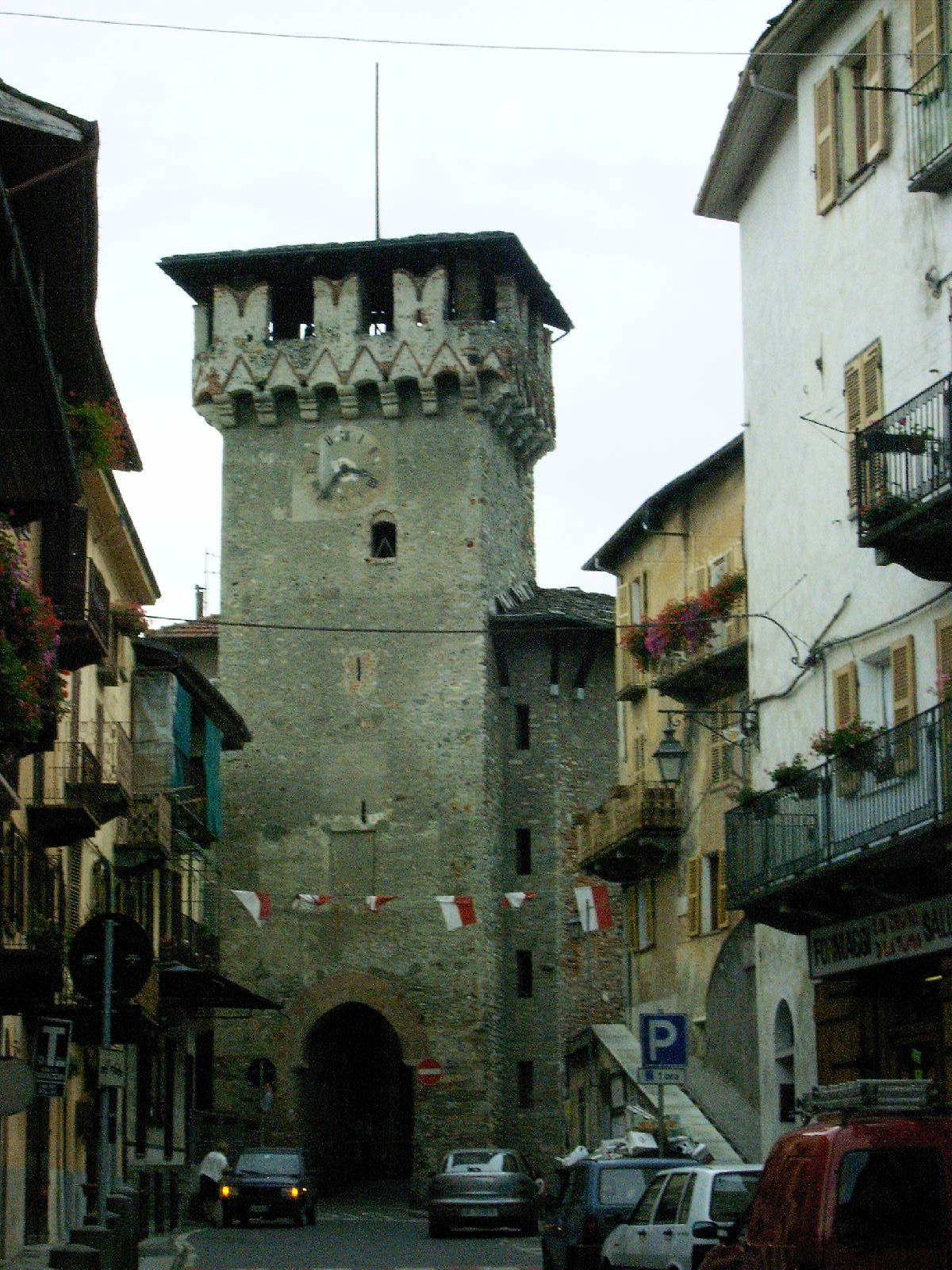
Civic Tower of Aymone of Challant

Lanzo is mentioned in the early 11th century as Curtis Lanceii. Later, under several names, was a fief (together with its namesake valleys) to the bishop of Turin, of the house of Savoy and of the Marquisate of Montferrat.

In the mid-16th century the Castle of Lanzo, considered amongst the most important in Piedmont, was besieged, stormed (1551) and destroyed by French troops under Charles de Brissac (1551–52). Of the former fortifications, only the gate entrance of the town has remained to this day. After the Peace of Cateau-Cambrésis (1559), the town was returned to Duke Emmanuel Philibert of Savoy. After his death, Lanzo was assigned to his daughter Maria (1577), wife of Philip of Este. The Este government brought decline to Lanzo and its valleys, as it lost most of the previous privileges. In 1725 the fief went to Count Giuseppe Ottavio Cacherano Osasco della Rocca. In 1792, his family remained without an heir and Lanzo went to the Kingdom of Sardinia.

In 1798, during the French Revolutionary Wars, Lanzo was first captured by the Austrians. After the battle of Marengo, it became the capital of a French arrondissement and, later, the district capital. After the 1815 Restoration, it followed the history of Piedmont and, from 1861, that of the newly unified Kingdom of Italy.

In the 19th century, Lanzo changed from a mainly agricultural centre into a vacation seat for people from Turin, a trend spurred by the railway connection inaugurated in 1876. Also in this period, the first mechanical, textile and paper industries were established.

== Main sights ==
- The Ponte del diavolo ("Devil's Bridge"), a bridge spanning the Stura di Lanzo built in 1376. It was built to connect Lanzo to Turin avoiding passage in territories ruled by the Prince of Acaja of the Marquesses of Montferrat, both hostile to the House of Savoy.
- Civic Tower of Aymon of Challant (1329–57).
- Church of Santa Maria del Borgo (16th century)
- Parish church of San Pietro in Vincoli
- Church of Santa Croce (13th century)

== Cuisine ==
According to tradition, the grissino (breadstick) was invented here by Teobaldo Pecchio and Antonio Brunero in 1679.

== Notable people ==
- Sebastiano Richiardi (1834 – 1904), anatomist and zoologist
- Francesco Gianotti (1881 – 1967), architect
- Giovanna Masciotta (1942), fencer
- Michele Vietti (1954), lawyer and politician
- Camilla Borsotti (1988), alpine skier
