= Michele Vietti =

Italian politician

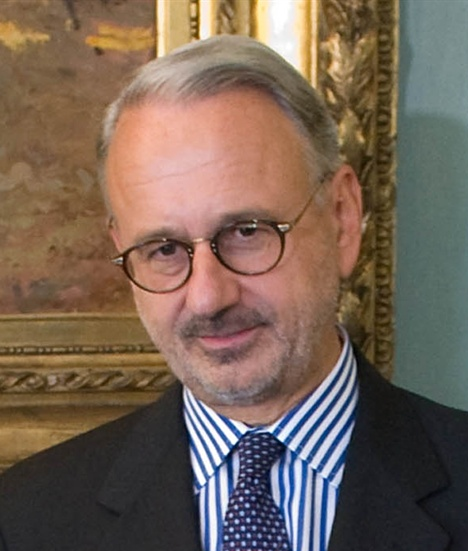

Vice-President of the Superior Council of Magistracy
- In office 2 August 2010 – 30 September 2014
- President: Giorgio Napolitano
- Preceded by: Nicola Mancino
- Succeeded by: Giovanni Legnini

Member of the Chamber of Deputies
- In office 15 April 1994 – 8 May 1996
- In office 30 May 2001 – 3 August 2010

Personal details
- Born: 10 February 1954 (age 72) Lanzo Torinese, Italy
- Party: DC (until 1994); CCD (1994–2002); UDC (since 2002)
- Education: University of Turin
- Occupation: Politician, lawyer, University professor

Michele Vietti (born 10 February 1954) is an Italian politician.

== Life and career ==
Born in Lanzo Torinese, Vietti graduated in law from the University of Turin in 1977, and between 1978 and 1987 he worked at the first Chair of Civil Law, at the Faculty of Law of the university.

His political activity began in 1990, when he was elected as a district counselor in Turin, and he held this position until 1997. First elected deputy in 2001 with the Center-Right coalition, in 2002 he joined the Christian Democratic Centre party. He has held government positions, as Secretary to the Ministry of Justice (in the second Berlusconi cabinet) and Undersecretary to the Ministry of Economy and Finance (third Berlusconi cabinet). He was re-elected deputy in 2006 and the following year he was appointed deputy secretary of his national party. Re-elected in 2008 with Union of Christian and Centre Democrats, Vietti received the role of deputy chairman of his parliamentary group.

From 2010 to 30 September 2014 Vietti was the vice president of the Superior Council of Magistracy.
