= Union of the Centre (2002) =

Italian political party

Union of the Centre Unione di Centro
- Abbreviation: UDC
- Secretary: Antonio De Poli
- President: Lorenzo Cesa
- Founded: 6 December 2002; 23 years ago
- Merger of: Christian Democratic Centre; United Christian Democrats; European Democracy
- Headquarters: Via in Lucina 10, Rome
- Youth wing: Giovani UDC
- Membership (2016): 50,000
- Ideology: Christian democracy Social conservatism
- Political position: Centre to centre-right
- National affiliation: Centre-right coalition
- European affiliation: European People's Party
- European Parliament group: European People's Party (2004–2019)
- International affiliation: Centrist Democrat International
- Colors: Light blue
- Chamber of Deputies: 1 / 400
- Senate: 1 / 205
- European Parliament: 0 / 76
- Regional Councils: 7 / 896

Website
- udc-italia.it

The Union of the Centre (Italian: Unione di Centro, UdC), whose complete name is Union of Christian Democrats and Centre Democrats (Unione dei Democratici Cristiani e Democratici di Centro, UDC), is a Christian-democratic political party in Italy.

Antonio De Poli is the party's current secretary, while Lorenzo Cesa its president. For years, Pier Ferdinando Casini was the most recognisable figure and de facto leader of the party, before eventually distancing from it in 2016. The UdC is a member of the European People's Party (EPP) and the Centrist Democrat International (CDI), of which Casini was president from 2004 to 2015.

The party was formed as "Union of Christian and Centre Democrats" in December 2002 upon the merger of the Christian Democratic Centre (CCD), the United Christian Democrats (CDU) and European Democracy (DE). In 2008 the party was the driving force behind the "Union of the Centre" (UdC), an alliance comprising, among others, The Rose for Italy of Bruno Tabacci and Savino Pezzotta, the Populars of Ciriaco De Mita and the Liberal Clubs of Ferdinando Adornato. Since then, the party's official name was neglected in favour of the alliance's and, since most of the UdC member parties have joined the UDC too, the UDC and the UdC started to overlap almost completely to the point that they are now indistinguishable.

The CCD was an early ally of Silvio Berlusconi's Forza Italia in 1994 and was part of the centre-right Pole/House of Freedoms since its establishment. Consequently, the UDC was consistently part of the centre-right until 2006. Later, it was affiliated neither to the centre-right nor the centre-left at the national level. Despite this, the party continued to take part in several regional, provincial and municipal governments with the old and the new Forza Italia, while forming alliances also with the centre-left Democratic Party in some regions and cities. In the 2013 general election the UdC was part of With Monti for Italy, the coalition formed around Mario Monti's Civic Choice, and obtained a mere 1.8% of the vote, down from 5.6% in 2008 and 6.8% in 2006. In December 2014 the party, which sat in Enrico Letta's government and Matteo Renzi's government (2013–2016), formed Popular Area with Angelino Alfano's New Centre-Right. In December 2016 the UdC left the alliance, did not join Paolo Gentiloni's government and suffered the final split by Casini and his followers. The party has since returned into the centre-right coalition's fold and took part to the 2018 and 2022 general elections within centrist joint lists. More recently, the UdC distanced from Forza Italia and formed an alliance with the League.

== History ==
=== Background ===
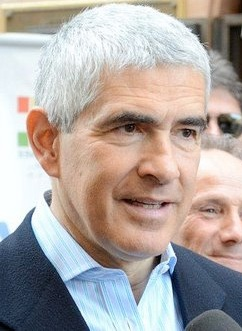
Pier Ferdinando Casini

In the 2001 Italian general election, the Christian Democratic Centre (CCD), led by Pier Ferdinando Casini, and the United Christian Democrats (CDU), a 1995 split from the Italian People's Party (PPI) led by Rocco Buttiglione were part of the winning centre-right House of Freedoms coalition, but their joint list (informally known as White Flower) won a mere 3.2% of the vote (−2.6pp from 1996). In the event, the two parties suffered the competition of European Democracy (DE), led by Sergio D'Antoni and formed largely by further splinters from the PPI, which obtained 2.4% of the vote.

After the election, Casini was elected President of the Chamber of Deputies and was replaced by Marco Follini as secretary of the CCD. Soon after, Silvio Berlusconi appointed Carlo Giovanardi (CCD) and Buttiglione (CDU) as ministers in his second government.

A few months later, the CCD and the CDU jointly scored 19.7% of the vote in a regional election (+0.7pp from the previous regional election) in Sicily, which was a stronghold for both parties, and Salvatore Cuffaro (CDU) was elected President of Sicily with a landslide 59.1% of the vote. DE won 4.5% of the vote and D'Antoni was elected to the Sicilian Regional Assembly.

=== Foundation and early years ===
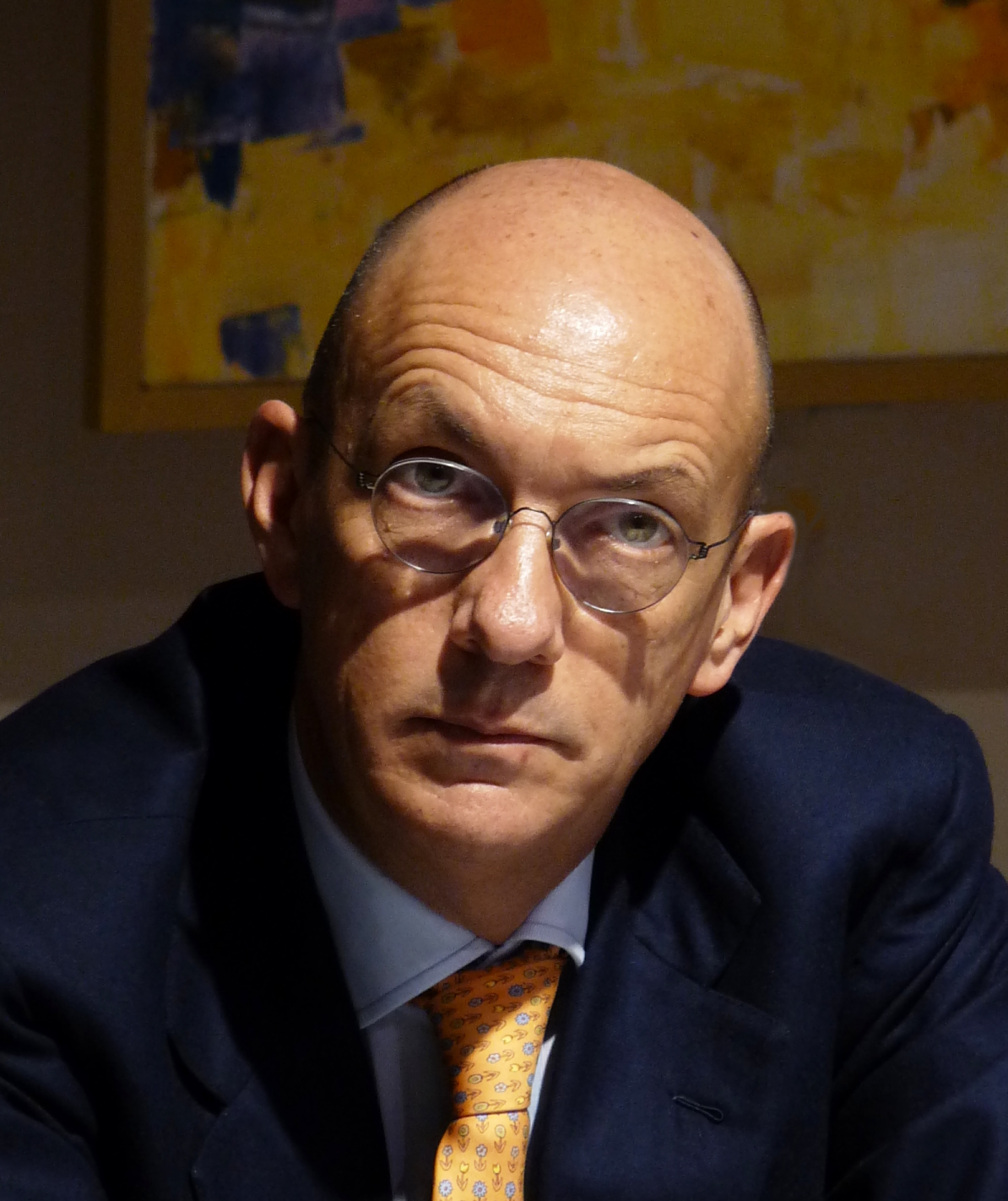
Marco Follini

On 6 December 2002, the CCD, the CDU and DE were merged into the "Union of Christian and Centre Democrats" (UDC). During the party's first congress, Follini was elected secretary, D'Antoni deputy secretary and Buttiglione president.

At the 2004 European Parliament election, the UDC won 5.9% of the vote and five MEPs. Consequently, the party successfully lobbied for Follini's appointment as Deputy Prime Minister in Berlusconi's government with the goal of strengthening and balancing the coalition, while diminishing the influence of the Northern League.

At the 2005 regional elections, the UDC and the House of Freedoms faced a severe defeat by winning only two regions out of 14. Follini asked Berlusconi to resign and form a new government. In the new executive, Buttiglione became minister of Culture, while Follini stepped down from his previous post to concentrate on the party. On 15 October 2005 Follini suddenly resigned from his position as party secretary and was replaced on 27 October by Lorenzo Cesa, an ally of Casini.

The party took part to the 2006 general election with a new logo, characterised by the inclusion of the name of Casini, who also headed party electoral lists in most constituencies. Despite the defeat of the House of Freedoms, the UDC improved its electoral performance by gaining 6.8% of the vote. In the following Sicilian regional election Cuffaro was re-elected President, but the UDC's share of the vote was reduced to 13.0%, due to two factors: the presence of president's list named after Cuffaro (which obtained 5.7% and elected mostly UdC members) and the strong showing of the Movement for Autonomy (MpA) (12.5%).

=== Transition and splits ===
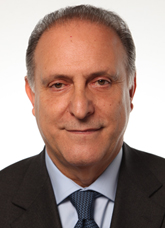
Lorenzo Cesa

In October 2006, Follini, a harsh critic of Berlusconi, finally left the party to form a new grouping, called Middle Italy, which was eventually merged into the centre-left Democratic Party (PD) upon its foundation in October 2007. This was the fourth split suffered by the UDC in two years after three much bigger splits: the first led by Sergio D'Antoni, who joined The Daisy in 2004; the second by Gianfranco Rotondi, who launched the Christian Democracy for Autonomies (DCA) in 2005; the third by Raffaele Lombardo, who formed the Sicilian-based MpA later that year.

After the departure of Follini, however, Casini became highly critical of Berlusconi too and further distanced the UDC from him. A fifth major split happened at the end of January 2008 when Bruno Tabacci and Mario Baccini left the party because Casini seemed eager to re-join Berlusconi for the upcoming election, after that the Prodi II Cabinet had not passed through a vote of confidence. Shortly afterwards, when Casini refused to merge his party into Berlusconi's then-new political movement, The People of Freedom (PdL), the UDC was joined by The Rose for Italy of Tabacci, Baccini and Savino Pezzotta, as well as by two leading members of Forza Italia (FI), Ferdinando Adornato and Angelo Sanza. On the other side, the UDC was left by those who wanted to continue the alliance with Berlusconi: Giovanardi and his faction (the Liberal Populars) joined the PdL, citing that the 72% of UDC voters wanted the party to do so. They were soon followed by many others.

=== Union of the Centre ===
On 28 February 2008, the UDC announced that it would contest the 2008 general election under the banner of the "Union of the Centre" (UdC), in alliance with The Rose for Italy and other smaller groups, notably including the Populars around Ciriaco De Mita, former leader of Christian Democracy (DC), the Liberal Clubs, the Christian Democratic Party, Veneto for the EPP, the Democratic Populars and the Autonomist Democrats. Despite having lost many votes to the PdL, the UDC was able to woo some new voters from the centre-left and gained 5.6% of the vote, 36 deputies (all UDC members but four) and three senators. Soon after the election, Baccini, one of the leaders of The Rose, surprisingly left the UdC to join the PdL.

After the election, Casini relaunched his plan for a new "centrist" party, as an alternative to both the PdL and the PD. This is what he called the "party of the nation", open to "centrists", "Christian democrats", "liberals" and "reformers", even though he presented it as a party based on Christian values, as opposed both to the PD and the PdL, which, despite being a centre-right party, also included social-liberal factions. Casini long criticised the PdL for not being "Catholic" enough, particularly criticising Berlusconi, who once spoke of "anarchy of values" in describing the catch-all nature of the PdL, and Gianfranco Fini, who was known for his social-liberal stance on stem-cell research, abortion and right-to-die issues, and explicitly wooed the "Christian democrats of the PD" to join him.

In the 2009 European Parliament election, the UdC won 6.5% of the vote and five of its candidates were elected to the European Parliament, including De Mita and Magdi Allam. In the 2010 regional elections, the UdC chose to form alliances both with the centre-right and the centre-left (or stood alone) in different regions, depending on local conditions, losing ground everywhere but in those southern regions where it was in alliance with the centre-right.

=== Centre-left coalitions ===
In December 2010, the UdC was a founding member of the New Pole for Italy (NPI), along with Future and Freedom (FLI) and the Alliance for Italy. The NPI alliance was short-lived and the three parties, which were supporters of Mario Monti's technocratic government in 2011–2013, parted ways. In 2012 the UdC suffered the split of another Sicilian-based group, Cantiere Popolare (CP), which would be a strong competitor for the party in Sicily, along with the evergreen MpA.

The UdC contested the 2013 general election as part of the With Monti for Italy coalition, alongside FLI and Monti's Civic Choice (SC). The election was a huge defeat for the UdC, which obtained a mere 1.8% of the vote, eight deputies and two senators. After the election, the party joined Enrico Letta's government with Gianpiero D'Alia as minister of Public Administration (2013–2014) and Matteo Renzi's government with Gianluca Galletti as minister of the Environment (2014–2016).

In February 2014, during the party's fourth congress, Cesa was narrowly re-elected secretary over D'Alia, who was then elected president.

The UdC ran in the 2014 European Parliament election on a joint list with the New Centre-Right (NCD), a mainly Christian-democratic outfit emerged from a split from the PdL in its final days. The list obtained 4.4% of the vote and three MEPs, two for the NCD and one for the UdC.

In December 2014, the alliance with the NCD was strengthened with the formation of the Popular Area (AP) joint parliamentary groups.

=== Re-foundation ===
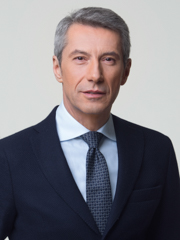
Antonio De Poli

In 2016, Casini did not renew his membership to the party, which was thus deprived of its most recognisable leader. Additionally, while still being part of the government and AP, the UdC chose not to support the "yes" in the 2016 constitutional referendum and to distance from the NCD, rejecting any notion of a joint party. In the run-up of the referendum the party was also abandoned by president D'Alia. After the referendum, which saw a huge defeat of the "yes" side, the UdC left AP altogether, but, other than Casini and D'Alia, the party lost another deputy and, more important, minister Galletti. Antonio De Poli replaced D'Alia as president.

In 2017, the UdC was joined by three senators from other parties. The party's new course was marked also by the return of Follini. For the 2017 Sicilian regional election, the UdC re-joined the centre-right at the regional level. The decision led some leading former UdC members in Sicily to return into the party's fold, but was criticised by the party's deputy secretary Giuseppe De Mita, his uncle Ciriaco and Follini, who would jointly launch Italy Is Popular, lead it into the Popular Civic List and join the centre-left coalition.

=== Return to the centre-right coalition ===
In the run-up of the 2018 general election, the UdC officially re-joined the centre-right coalition also at the national level, aiming at teaming up with other Christian-democratic parties, notably including the Union of Democrats for Europe (UDEUR), as well as the Italian Liberal Party (PLI) and Energies for Italy (EpI). Thus, the UdC joined Us with Italy (NcI), a pro-Berlusconi centrist electoral list formed by AP splinters (two groups, a Christian-democratic one led by Maurizio Lupi and a liberal one led by Enrico Costa), Direction Italy (DI), Civic Choice (SC), Act!, CP and the MpA, with the goal of reaching 3%, required to win seats from proportional lists under a new electoral law. NcI was later joined also by IdeA, UdC's partner in the Chamber of Deputies. In the election, the NcI obtained a mere 1.3% of the vote and the UdC had three senators elected from single-seat constituencies: De Poli, Paola Binetti and Antonio Saccone. Soon after the election, the party quit NcI and formed a pact with FI.

In the run-up of the 2022 general election, the UdC first formed a joint list with Coraggio Italia (CI), then it was a founding member of Us Moderates (NM), a broader joint list within the centre-right coalition, along with CI, NcI and Italy in the Centre (IaC).

In the run-up of the 2024 European Parliament election, the UdC joined forces with the League.

In July 2025 Cesa stepped down from secretary after 20 years and the party's national council elected De Poli to succeed him.

In the 2025 regional elections the party fielded its own lists in most regions, obtaining 1.9% of the vote and one elect in Marche, 1.7% and one elect in Veneto (62.0% in De Poli's hometown of Carmignano di Brenta, whose UdC's mayor, Eric Pasqualon, was elected), 1.3% in Calabria and 0.5% in Campania.

== Ideology ==
Although it is the most vocal supporter of social conservatism in Italy (opposition to abortion, euthanasia, same-sex marriage, LGBT adoption and legality of cannabis are some of its main concerns) and can be easily connected with the Christian right, the UdC is usually identified with the political centre in Italy, thanks to its roots in the Christian Democracy (DC).

However, The Economist once described it as a right-wing, sometimes reactionary party, which "stretches a long way from the centre". Moreover, it wrote that many UDC members are "diehard corporatists who [...] get most of their votes from the south, where many households depend either on welfare or on public-sector employment". Indeed, the party is stronger in the South and especially in Sicily, where public-sector employment is widely spread.

The UDC was an independent-minded and often reluctant member of the House of Freedoms coalition from 2002 to 2008. The party's leading figure, Pier Ferdinando Casini, was critical of Silvio Berlusconi's leadership over the Italian centre-right and presented himself as a moderate alternative to populism, which, in his view, denoted the alliance between The People of Freedom (PdL) and the Northern League. UDC's main goal, similarly to that of the Democratic Movement in France, has been to form governments beyond the left-right divide (e.g.: Monti Cabinet and Letta Cabinet) and, possibly, reassembling the remnants of the old DC and control Italian politics from the centre. In this respect, Casini and his followers have long tried to form the nucleus of a third force in Italian politics (e.g.: New Pole for Italy, With Monti for Italy, Popular Area).

This "centrist option" has not succeeded yet: the UdC has remained a much lighter force compared to Berlusconi's parties (Forza Italia, the PdL and finally the new Forza Italia), which have drawn most former DC voters, and Italians like confrontational politics based on alternative coalitions and many would support a two-party system, in place of the typically Italian fragmented political spectrum. Finally, several political scientists think that the return of DC is all but likely as the "political unity of Catholics" (the core idea on which DC was based) is not repeatable and it would be anti-historical to try uniting all strains of political Catholicism in a single party.

Moreover, although UdC members are keen on presenting themselves as moderates, their solid social conservatism has harmed their prospects, while FI/PdL/FI has been popular also among secularised middle-class voters. Knowing that, Casini tried to open his party, through the UdC, also to non-Christian-democratic "centrists", "liberals" and "reformers", while wooing former DC members affiliated with other parties, especially the PdL and the centre-left Democratic Party (PD). After Casini's exit from the party in 2016, the UdC is likely to return to its traditional Christian-democratic roots, as declared by Cesa in a speech to the party's national council.

On specific issues, it is relevant to state that the UdC is one of the main supporters of nuclear energy in the Italian political arena.

== Factions ==
At the 2007 national congress, there were basically four factions within the party.

- Casiniani. Led by Pier Ferdinando Casini, Lorenzo Cesa and Rocco Buttiglione, the faction included also Mario Tassone (co-leader with Buttiglione of a sub-group composed of former members of the United Christian Democrats (CDU), which controlled more than 15% of party delegates), Michele Vietti, Luca Volontè, Francesco D'Onofrio, Maurizio Ronconi, Francesco Bosi and Antonio De Poli, and gained the support of at least 45% of party members.
- Tabaccini. This group, which had the support of the 30% of party members, was basically the left wing of the party, including leading politicians such as Bruno Tabacci, Mario Baccini and Armando Dionisi, who were formerly close allies of Marco Follini. They proposed to start a co-operation with the Democratic Party (PD) or the formation of a centrist party open to figures like Luca Cordero di Montezemolo and Mario Monti.
- Cuffariani. This third group consisted in the southern faction of Salvatore Cuffaro, former President of Sicily and was somewhat critical of the centralist-styled leadership of the party. This group, which included Calogero Mannino, Francesco Saverio Romano, Giuseppe Naro and Giuseppe Drago, held the 10% of the party delegates and supported the Casini-Cesa line, although its members had been often friendlier to Berlusconi. In September 2010 most Cuffariani, led by Romano, left the UDC to form The Populars of Italy Tomorrow (PID) and support the Berlusconi IV Cabinet.
- Giovanardiani. It was the group led by Carlo Giovanardi and Emerenzio Barbieri, who wanted closer ties with Forza Italia and the other parties of the House of Freedoms coalition, including the Northern League. At the congress, the bid of Giovanardi for the leadership was supported by 13.8% of delegates. Before leaving the UDC in February 2008 to join the PdL, Giovanardi and Barbieri organised their faction as Liberal Populars.

The three main schisms suffered by the party between 2004 and 2006, Middle Italy (IdM), Movement for Autonomy (MpA) and Christian Democracy for Autonomies (DCA), were led by the most vocal supporters of each of the last three factions mentioned above, respectively Marco Follini, Raffaele Lombardo and Gianfranco Rotondi. By 2010 virtually all Giovanardiani and Cuffariani had left the party through the Liberal Populars and the PID.

== Popular support ==
The UDC/UdC has been historically stronger in the South and in regional elections.

The electoral results of the UDC/UdC in the 10 most populated regions of Italy are shown in the table below.

The score for the 2006 Sicilian regional election refers to the combined result of the UDC (13.0) and of L'Aquilone–Lista del Presidente (5.7%), the personal list of Salvatore Cuffaro, UDC regional leader and President of Sicily. The elected members of this list were mostly UDC members.

	2004 European	2005 regional	2006 general	2008 general	2009 European	2010 regional	2013 general	2015 regional
Piedmont	5.0	4.6	6.2	5.2	6.1	3.9	1.2	(2014)
Lombardy	3.6	3.8	5.9	4.3	5.0	3.8	1.1	(2013)
Veneto	5.0	6.4	7.8	5.6	6.4	4.9	1.7	-
Emilia-Romagna	2.8	3.9	5.8	4.3	4.7	3.8	1.1	(2014)
Tuscany	3.3	3.7	5.9	4.2	4.6	4.8	1.1	-
Lazio	7.1	7.8	6.9	4.8	5.5	6.1	1.5	(2013)
Campania	7.0	6.7	6.8	6.5	8.7	9.4	3.6	2.4
Apulia	8.1	7.8	7.8	7.9	9.1	6.5	2.0	5.9
Calabria	9.6	10.4	7.7	8.2	9.3	9.4	4.1	2.7
Sicily	14.0	18.7 (2006)	10.0	9.4	11.9	12.5 (2008)	2.8	10.8 (2012); 7.1 (2017)
Italy	5.9	-	6.8	5.6	6.5	-	1.8	-

== Election results ==
=== Italian Parliament ===
Election	Leader	Chamber of Deputies					Senate of the Republic				
Election	Leader	Votes	%	Seats	+/–	Position	Votes	%	Seats	+/–	Position
2008	Pier Ferdinando Casini	2,580,190	6.8	39 / 630	–	4th	2,309,442	6.8	21 / 315	–	6th
2008	Pier Ferdinando Casini	2,050,309	5.6	36 / 630	▼3	▲4th	1,898,842	5.7	3 / 315	▼18	▲4th
2013	Pier Ferdinando Casini	608,199	1.8	8 / 630	▼28	▼9th	into Monti for Italy		2 / 315	▼1	–
2018	Lorenzo Cesa	into Us with Italy		0 / 630	▼8	–	into Us with Italy		3 / 315	▲1	–
2022	Lorenzo Cesa	into Us Moderates		1 / 400	▲1	–	into Us Moderates		1 / 200	▼2	–

=== European Parliament ===
Election	Leader	Votes	%	Seats	+/–	EP Group
2004	Pier Ferdinando Casini	1,914,726 (5th)	5.9	5 / 78	New	EPP
2009	Pier Ferdinando Casini	1,995,021 (5th)	6.5	5 / 72	0	EPP
2014 (Note: Run in a joint list with New Centre-Right.)	Lorenzo Cesa	1,202,350 (5th)	4.4	1 / 73	▼4	EPP
2019	Lorenzo Cesa	Into Forza Italia		0 / 76	▼1	–
2024	Lorenzo Cesa	Into Lega		0 / 76	0	–

=== Regional Councils ===
Region	Election year	Votes	%	Seats	+/−	Status in legislature
Aosta Valley	2025	—N/a	—N/a	0 / 35	–	No seats
Piedmont	2024	With Forza Italia	–	0 / 50	–	No seats
Lombardy	2023	Into Us Moderates	–	0 / 80	–	No seats
South Tyrol	2023	—N/a	—N/a	0 / 35	–	No seats
Trentino	2023	1,362	0.6	0 / 35	–	No seats
Veneto	2020	Into Forza Italia	–	0 / 51	▼3	No seats
Friuli-Venezia Giulia	2023	Into Fedriga list	–	1 / 49	▲1	Majority
Emilia-Romagna	2024	Into Lega	–	0 / 50	0	No seats
Liguria	2024	7,294	1.3	0 / 31	0	No seats
Tuscany	2025	With Forza Italia	–	0 / 41	0	No seats
Marche	2025	10,853	1.9	1 / 31	0	Majority
Umbria	2024	1,432	0.5	0 / 20	0	No seats
Lazio	2023	24,983 (10th)	1.6	1 / 50	▲1	Majority
Abruzzo	2024	6,784	1,2	0 / 31	▼1	No seats
Molise	2023	5,005	3.5	0 / 21	0	No seats
Campania	2020	45,326	1.9	0 / 51	▼2	No seats
Apulia	2020	31,736	1.9	0 / 51	▼3	No seats
Basilicata	2024	6,636	2.5	0 / 21	0	No seats
Calabria	2025	9,750	1.3	0 / 30	▼2	Majority
Sicily	2022	Into DC	—N/a	1 / 70	▼4	Majority
Sardinia	2024	19,237	2.8	1 / 60	▼3	Opposition

== Symbols ==
2002–2006

2006–2008

2008

2009–2013

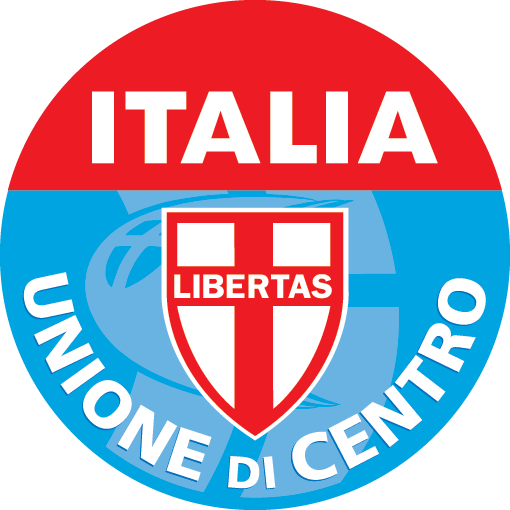
2013–present

== Leadership ==
- Secretary: Marco Follini (2002–2005), Lorenzo Cesa (2005–2025), Antonio De Poli (2025–present)
- Deputy Secretary: Sergio D'Antoni (2002–2004), Mario Tassone (2004–2013), Erminia Mazzoni (2005–2007), Salvatore Cuffaro (2005–2010), Armando Dionisi (2007–2008), Michele Vietti (2007–2010), Mauro Libè (2014–2016), Giuseppe De Mita (2014–2017), Antonio De Poli (2014–2025), Gianfranco Chiarelli (2023–present), Paolo Greco Lucchina (2025–present)
  - Head of Political Secretariat: Lorenzo Cesa (2002–2005), Armando Dionisi (2005–2007), Antonio De Poli (2007–2014), Massimo Cassano (2023–2025)
  - Spokesperson: Michele Vietti (2006–2007), Francesco Pionati (2007–2008), Antonio De Poli (2008–2014)
- President: Rocco Buttiglione (2002–2014), Gianpiero D'Alia (2014–2016), Antonio De Poli (2016–2025), Lorenzo Cesa (2025–present)
- Administrative Secretary: Salvatore Cherchi (2002–2005), Giuseppe Naro (2005–2014), Salvatore Ruggeri (2014–2021), Calogero Di Carlo (2021–2025), Regino Brachetti (2025–present)
- Organizational Secretary: Mario Baccini (2002–2005), Renato Grassi (2005–2006), Amedeo Ciccanti (2006–2007), Giuseppe Galati (2007), Francesco Saverio Romano (2007–2010), Antonio De Poli (2011–2014)
- Party Leader in the Chamber of Deputies: Luca Volontè (2001–2008), Pier Ferdinando Casini (2008–2012), Gian Luca Galletti (2012–2013), Giampiero D'Alia (2013), Giuseppe De Mita (2013–2014), Rocco Buttiglione (2014–2018), Lorenzo Cesa (2022–present)
- Party Leader in the Senate: Francesco D'Onofrio (2001–2008), Gianpiero D'Alia (2008–2013), Antonio De Poli (2013–present)
- Party Leader in the European Parliament: Vito Bonsignore (2004–2008), Iles Braghetto (2008–2009), Carlo Casini (2009–2014), Lorenzo Cesa (2014–2019)
