= Emerenzio Barbieri =

Italian politician (1946–2025)

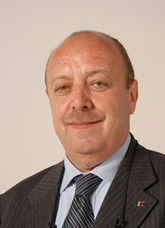
- Born: 19 October 1946; Reggio Emilia, Emilia-Romagna, Italy
- Died: 15 June 2025 (aged 78)

Emerenzio Barbieri (19 October 1946 – 15 June 2025) was an Italian politician.

== Life and career ==
Barbieri was born in Reggio Emilia on 19 October 1946. During his early life, he was a member of the Christian Democrats and Christian Democratic Center.

He was elected for the first time to the Chamber of Deputies in the 2001 elections, in the single-member constituency of Agrate Brianza, representing the House of Freedoms.

In the XIV Legislature, he was secretary of the Public and Private Employment Commission; he was also a member of the Culture, Science and Education Commission; the Parliamentary Commission for the control of the activities of the bodies managing compulsory forms of social security and assistance; of the Parliamentary Delegation to the Assembly of the Council of Europe; of the Parliamentary Delegation to the Assembly of the Western European Union.

In the 2006 elections, he was re-elected deputy on the lists of the Unione di Centro (UDC), this time in the Emilia-Romagna constituency.

In the XV Legislature, he was Vice-President of the Culture, Science and Education Commission. Already critical of the UDC line, he supported the minority motion led by Carlo Giovanardi at the III Congress in 2007.

On 4 February 2008, together with Giovanardi himself, he left the UDC and founded the Popular Liberal movement, which then joined Silvio Berlusconi's new political project, the People of Freedom. In the 2008 elections he was therefore re-elected as a deputy, on the lists of the People of Freedom in the Emilia-Romagna constituency. He became a member of the Board of Directors of the PdL in the Chamber of Deputies. He did not run for re-election in 2013.

Barbieri died on 15 June 2025, at the age of 78.
