= The Rose for Italy =

Italian political party

The Rose for Italy La Rosa per l'Italia
- President: Savino Pezzotta
- Founded: 8 February 2008
- Dissolved: 2014 (de facto)
- Ideology: Christian democracy Christian left Social conservatism
- Political position: Centre
- National affiliation: Union of the Centre (2008–2013)

Website
- www.rosaperlitalia.it

The Rose for Italy (La Rosa per l'Italia), also known as White Rose (Rosa Bianca) and Popular Civic Federative Movement (Movimento Federativo Civico Popolare), was a Christian-democratic political party in Italy.

== History ==
On 30 January 2008, Bruno Tabacci and Mario Baccini announced that they were leaving the Union of Christian and Centre Democrats (UDC) in order to form a new centrist party. On 8 February the White Rose was officially launched.

The party emerged right after the fall of Prodi II Cabinet. Tabacci and Baccini wanted to support the formation of a government led by Franco Marini, which would approve a new electoral law on the German model. UDC leader Pier Ferdinando Casini opted for fresh elections instead, in line with the other leader of the centre-right House of Freedoms coalition.

Many leading figures joined the new party, notably Savino Pezzotta (former leader of the Italian Confederation of Workers' Trade Unions, who was appointed president), Gerardo Bianco and Alberto Monticone (Popular Italy), Gian Guido Folloni (a former minister), Elvio Ubaldi (a former Mayor of Parma), Gianni Rivera and Beniamino Donnici (both MEPs). Tabacci and Baccini tried unsuccessfully to recruit Antonio Di Pietro and his Italy of Values party, Luca Cordero di Montezemolo and Mario Monti.

On 28 February 2011 the party decided to form joint-lists with UDC in the forthcoming general election, under the name Union of the Centre (UdC). On 11 March both Bianco and Monticone left the party and re-established Popular Italy. Rivera and Donnici left too. In the election, the UdC obtained 5.6% of the vote and 36 deputies, including Baccini, Tabacci and Pezzotta.

A few weeks after the election, Baccini announced his vote of confidence to Berlusconi IV Cabinet and his resignation from secretary of the party. He was thus replaced by Tabacci, who too left in 2009 in order to launch the Alliance for Italy (ApI). Since then, the party was Pezzotta's personal faction within the UdC.

In 2013 the party left the UdC and returned to be an independent party, under the leadership of Pezzotta.

== Leadership ==
- President: Savino Pezzotta (since 2008)
  - Vice President: Gerardo Bianco (2008), Alberto Monticone (2008)
- Secretary: Mario Baccini (2008), Bruno Tabacci (2008–2009)
  - Deputy-Secretary: Elvio Ubaldi (2008–2009)
