= Giuseppe De Mita =

Italian politician

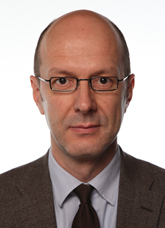

Member of the Chamber of Deputies
- In office 15 March 2013 – 23 March 2018

Personal details
- Born: 27 April 1968 (age 58) Avellino, Italy
- Party: DC (till 1994); PPI (1994-2002); DL (2002-2007); PD (2007-2008); UdC (2008–2017); IP (since 2017)
- Relatives: Ciriaco De Mita (uncle)
- Education: Università Cattolica del Sacro Cuore
- Occupation: Politician, lawyer

Giuseppe De Mita (born 27 April 1968) is an Italian politician.

== Early life ==
Giuseppe De Mita is the son of Michele De Mita, brother of former Prime Minister and leader of the Christian Democracy Ciriaco De Mita. He is a nephew of former Prime Minister Ciriaco De Mita. He graduated in Law at the Catholic University of Milan in 1994 and became a lawyer.

== Political career ==
De Mita is a member of the Christian Democracy, of the Italian People's Party and The Daisy, for which he was elected city councilor in Avellino in 2004.

From 2007 to 2008, De Mita was the secretary of the Democratic Party in the province of Avellino, until he left the party together with uncle Ciriaco, joining the Union of the Centre, for which he ran unsuccessfully for the Chamber of Deputies during the 2008 general election.

From 2009 to 2010 he was vice president of the province of Avellino. De Mita was appointed vice president of Campania and Regional Councilor for Tourism and Cultural Heritage by the President of Campania Stefano Caldoro, a member of the People of Freedom party. He held the office until 2013, when he was elected to the Chamber of Deputies at the 2013 general election.

In 2017, De Mita left the UDC, having opposed an alliance between the party and the centre-right coalition and hoping to build an alliance with the Democratic Party. He founded the movement Italy Is Popular, federated in the Popular Civic List.

He ran again for the Chamber of Deputies at the 2018 general election, but lost.
