= Club of Freedom =

Italian political organisation

The National Association Club of Freedom (Associazione Nazionale Circolo della Libertà), more frequently referred to as Clubs of Freedom (Circoli della Libertà), was a grassroots organisation within The People of Freedom, a political party in Italy.

It was formed on 20 November 2006 and, since then, its leader has been Michela Vittoria Brambilla, a former president of the youth section of Confcommercio. The group started as an organisation very close to Forza Italia, although there was no official affiliation, many members were active in other centre-right parties or not members of any party. Silvio Berlusconi himself, leader of Forza Italia, proposed the foundation of the Clubs of Freedom during the annual meeting of Communion and Liberation in Rimini in August 2006.

The goal of the Clubs was to build a political-cultural group of citizens who want to take part to the national political life by starting from local issues, such as city administration, and to build a united centre-right party in Italy. That goal was eventually reached with the foundation of The People of Freedom (PdL) between November 2007 and March 2009 and the Clubs of Freedom were among the official founding members of the new party.

Within the PdL, the Clubs are still active, but they became part of the larger Promoters of Freedom organization.
