= Bruno Tabacci =

Italian politician (born 1946)

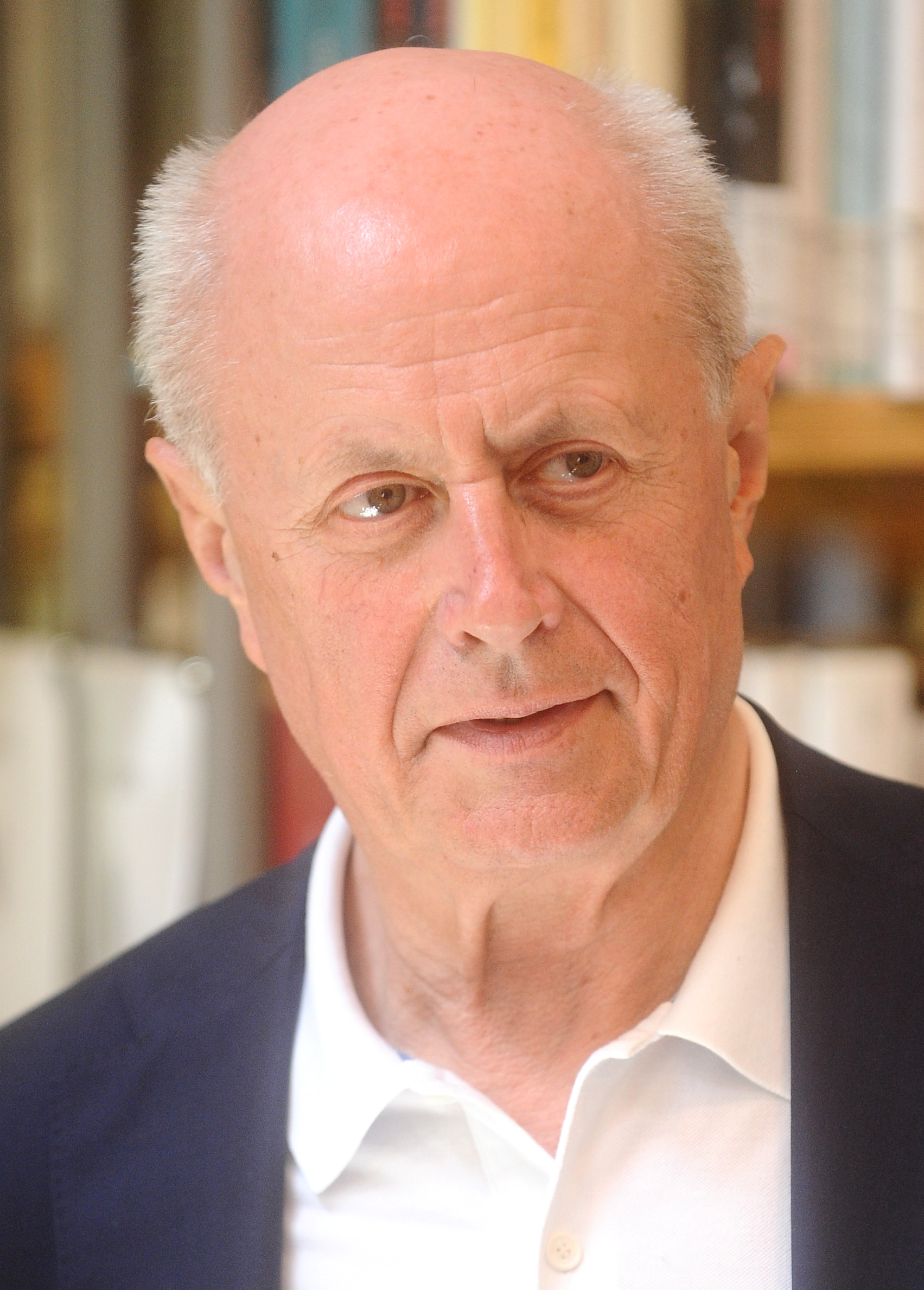

Member of the Chamber of Deputies
- Incumbent
- Assumed office 30 May 2001
- Constituency: Lombardy
- In office 23 April 1992 – 14 April 1994
- Constituency: Mantua

President of Lombardy
- In office 17 July 1987 – 31 January 1989
- Preceded by: Giuseppe Guzzetti
- Succeeded by: Giuseppe Giovenzana

Personal details
- Born: 27 August 1946 (age 80) Quistello, Italy
- Party: DC (until 1994); PPI (1994–1998); CCD (1998–2002); UdC (2002-2008); RpI (2008–2009); ApI (2009–2012); CD (since 2012)
- Education: University of Parma

Bruno Tabacci (born 27 August 1946) is an Italian politician and member of the Chamber of Deputies. He is the president of the Democratic Centre. In the past, he was a member of Christian Democracy and served as the president of Lombardy from 1987 to 1989.

== Biography ==
Tabacci was born in Quistello, Lombardy in 1946. He later graduated in economics at University of Parma and worked as a consultant in economics and finance. During the early 1980s, he entered the Ministry of Industry together with Giovanni Marcora and, subsequently, served as head of the Technical Secretariat at the Minister of Treasury with Giovanni Goria.

From 1970 to 1985, Tabacci served for the Christian Democracy (DC) party as city councillor for several municipalities in the province of Mantua, including Mantua itself. From 1985 to 1991, he was regional councillor of Lombardy and from 1987 to 1989 he also served as President of the Region, during which he dealt with the disastrous flood in Valtellina, from July to September 1987. In 1988, he became President of "Alpe-Adria", an association of Alpine and Adriatic Regions, an experience of significant international cooperation with areas in Eastern Europe before the fall of the Berlin Wall. In 1990, he became head of the DC council group and then vice-president of the regional council. In 1991, he served as President of the Committee for restructuring the livestock sector at the Ministry of Agriculture.

After the 1992 Italian general election, Tabacci was elected to the Chamber of Deputies for Mantua–Cremona constituency; during the legislature, he served as a member of the Budget Commission and proposer of the Financial Act 1994 laid out by the Ciampi Cabinet.

He was on the board of administration of Eni, Snam, Efibanca. Between 1999 and 2000, he was president of Autocisa (A15 Parma-La Spezia), from which he resigned when he became a Parliamentary candidate.

He was re-elected Parliamentary Deputy in 2001 for the House of Freedoms in the constituency of Castiglione delle Stiviere. He joined the group UDC (CCD-CDU). In June 2001, he was elected president of the tenth parliamentary commission for production, commerce and tourism.

On 11 December 2001, he was appointed Coordinator of VAST, the committee for the assessment of scientific and technological decisions, by decree from the President of the Chamber.

In August 2002, he was appointed President of the Italian-Mexican co-operation commission.

In 2006, he was re-elected Parliamentary Deputy for UDC and became a member of the Treasury Commission. In 2008, Tabacci founded, together with Savino Pezzotta and Mario Baccini, the White Rose party and was re-elected Deputy among the ranks of the Union of the Centre.

In 2012, Tabacci founded the Democratic Centre and, with this party, allied with the PD, was re-elected Deputy in 2013. In 2018 Tabacci granted to More Europe of Emma Bonino the symbol of the Democratic Centre to exempt it from the collection of signatures, required by Italian law to present the list for the elections (while the parties that elected MPs in the previous election are exempted). In the 2018 general election he was thus re-elected in the Milano 1 uninominal constituency.
