= Savino Pezzotta =

Italian politician and trade unionist

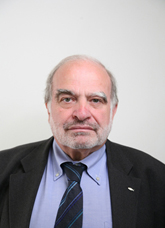

General Secretary of CISL
- In office 10 June 2000 – 4 April 2006
- Preceded by: Sergio D'Antoni
- Succeeded by: Raffaele Bonanni

Member of the Chamber of Deputies
- In office 29 April 2008 – 14 March 2013
- Constituency: Lombardia 2

Personal details
- Born: 25 December 1943 (age 82) Scanzorosciate, Italy
- Party: The Rose for Italy
- Profession: Politician, trade unionist

Savino Pezzotta (born 25 December 1943) is an Italian politician and trade unionist.

== Trade unionist ==
Pezzotta was a textile worker since 1959. In 1963, he joined the Italian Confederation of Workers' Trade Unions (CISL) and later became a trade union organizer.

In 1972, he joined the Workers' Political Movement, a group of progressive left-wing Catholics, and was a candidate for the Movement in the general election of 1972, obtaining 117 votes. After the small movement disappeared, he dedicated himself to trade union activity.

From 1993 to 1998, he was regional secretary of the CISL in Lombardy. In 1999, he joined the union's national leadership, and was elected its secretary-general one year later. He resigned this post after the general elections of 2006.

== Politician ==
In 2008 Pezzotta founded the White Rose party along with Mario Baccini and was elected to the Chamber of Deputies on the Union of the Centre list. On 17 January 2013 he left the UDC and joined the Mixed Group of the Chamber. He was not a candidate in the subsequent elections.
