= Popular Civic List =

Popular Civic List Civica Popolare
- Leader: Beatrice Lorenzin
- Founded: 29 December 2017
- Dissolved: 2019 (de facto)
- Headquarters: Via del Governo Vecchio, 3; 00186 Rome
- Ideology: Christian democracy
- Political position: Centre
- National affiliation: Centre-left coalition

The Popular Civic List (Italian: Civica Popolare, CP) was a centrist coalition of political parties in Italy. Its leader is Beatrice Lorenzin, minister of Health from 2013 to 2018 and member of Popular Alternative.

== History ==
CP participated in the 2018 general election as part of the centre-left coalition centred on the Democratic Party (PD), along with Together (notably including the Italian Socialist Party) and the liberal More Europe.

CP's electoral symbol consisted of a stylised peony, Lorenzin's name and the logos of Italy of Values, the Centrists for Europe (CpE), the Union for Trentino, Italy Is Popular and Popular Alternative (AP). The coalition also included Solidary Democracy, Popular Italy and the Christian Popular Union, although their logos did not appear on the coalition's symbol.

In the event, the list obtained a mere 0.5% of the vote, but three of its candidates were elected in single-seat constituencies: Lorenzin and Gabriele Toccafondi (both members of AP) to the Chamber and Pier Ferdinando Casini (CpE) to the Senate.

In September 2019 Lorenzin directlty joined the PD, while Toccafondi joined Matteo Renzi's new Italia Viva party.

== Composition ==
=== Main members ===
Party	Main ideology	Leader/s
Popular Alternative	Christian democracy	Beatrice Lorenzin
Italy of Values	Populism	Ignazio Messina
Centrists for Europe	Christian democracy	Pier Ferdinando Casini
Union for Trentino	Regionalism	Tiziano Mellarini
Italy Is Popular	Christian democracy	Giuseppe De Mita

=== Other members ===
Party	Main ideology	Leader/s
Solidary Democracy	Christian left	Lorenzo Dellai
Christian Popular Union	Christian democracy	Antonio Satta
Popular Italy	Christian democracy	Alberto Monticone

== Election results ==
Election	Leader	Chamber of Deputies				Senate of the Republic			
Election	Leader	Votes	%	Seats	Position	Votes	%	Seats	Position
2018	Beatrice Lorenzin	210,178	0.54	2 / 630	13th	189,942	0.52	1 / 315	13th
