= Marco Follini =

Italian politician and journalist

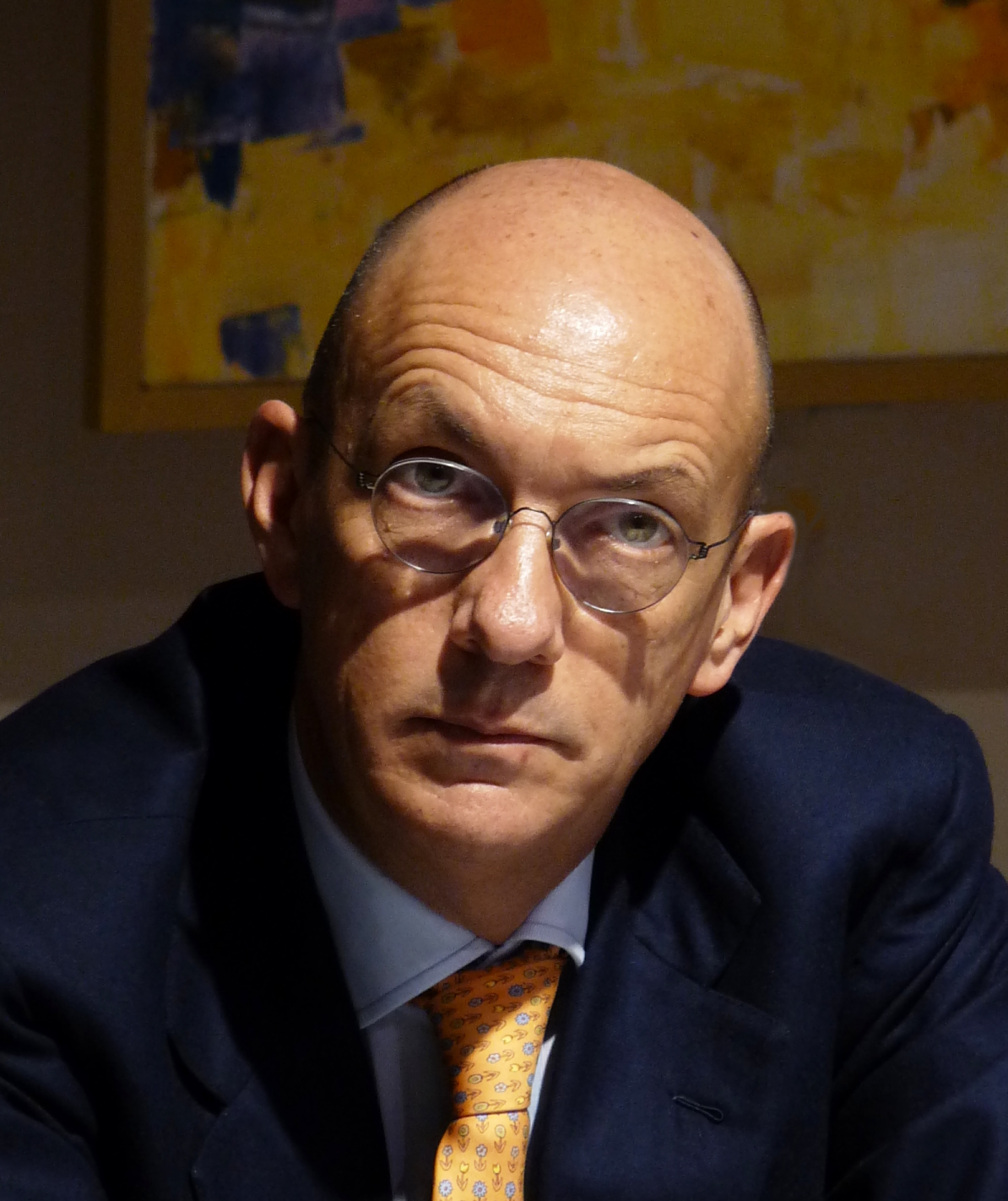

Deputy Prime Minister of Italy
- In office 3 December 2004 – 18 April 2005 Serving with Gianfranco Fini
- Prime Minister: Silvio Berlusconi

Member of the Chamber of Deputies
- In office 9 May 1996 – 27 April 2006

Member of the Senate of the Republic
- In office 28 April 2006 – 14 March 2013

Personal details
- Born: 26 September 1954 (age 71) Rome, Italy
- Party: DC (before 1994); CCD (1994–2002); UDC (2002–2006); IdM (2006–2007); PD (2007–2013)
- Height: 1.76 m (5 ft 9 in)
- Spouse: Elisabetta Spitz
- Children: 1
- Occupation: Politician, journalist

Marco Follini (real name Giuseppe Follini, born 26 September 1954) is an Italian politician and journalist.

Follini was born in Rome. He was National Secretary of the Union of Christian and Centre Democrats until 15 October 2005. He was also Vice-Prime Minister of Berlusconi's second government, taking office up to April 2005.

A former member of the Christian Democracy party, then he joined the Christian Democratic Centre and subsequently the UDC, becoming the national party leader in 2002, after the election of Pierferdinando Casini as President of the Chamber of Deputies. He unexpectedly resigned from his UDC leader position on 15 October 2005, following the approval of a new proportional electoral law by the ruling coalition the House of Freedoms, stating this was not the electoral law he actually wished.

Elected in the 2006 general election as Senator, he, along with Bruno Tabacci continued to show his disagreement of Berlusconi's leadership in the House of Freedoms. Follini also clashed with the rest of his party on several occasions, supporting, again with Bruno Tabacci's support, Giorgio Napolitano's candidacy in the presidential election and successfully campaigning in opposition to the constitutional reform approved by the House of Freedoms in 2005, then cancelled by a referendum.

On 18 October 2006 Follini officially left UDC and announced the foundation of a new centrist movement, called Middle Italy. On 24 February 2007, after President Giorgio Napolitano sent the resigning Prodi cabinet to the Senate for a confidence vote, Marco Follini announced he would vote in favour of it.

On 22 May 2007 he was appointed a member of the organizing committee of the embryonic centre-left Democratic Party.

He currently works as an editorialist for the weekly magazine L'Espresso and edits a weekly column ("Follini's point of view") on the online press agency Adnkronos.
