= Beatrice Lorenzin =

Italian politician (born 1971)

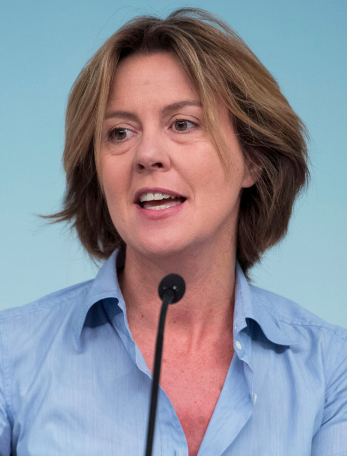

Minister of Health
- In office 28 April 2013 – 1 June 2018
- Prime Minister: Enrico Letta; Matteo Renzi; Paolo Gentiloni
- Preceded by: Renato Balduzzi
- Succeeded by: Giulia Grillo

Member of the Senate
- Incumbent
- Assumed office 13 October 2022
- Constituency: Veneto

Member of the Chamber of Deputies
- In office 29 April 2008 – 13 October 2022
- Constituency: Lazio 1 (2008–2018); Modena (2018–2022)

Personal details
- Born: 14 October 1971 (age 54) Rome, Italy
- Party: FI (1996–2009); PdL (2009–2013); NCD (2013–2017); AP (2017–2019); PD (2019–present)
- Spouse: Alessandro Picardi (m. 2016)
- Children: 2

Beatrice Lorenzin (born 14 October 1971) is an Italian politician belonging to the Democratic Party, former leader of Popular Alternative, and former Minister of Health from 28 April 2013 to 1 June 2018, in the governments of Enrico Letta, Matteo Renzi and Paolo Gentiloni. In 2018 she became one of the longest-serving health minister in the history of the Italian Republic.

== Early life ==
Beatrice Lorenzin was born in Rome on 14 October 1971. Her father was Istrian Italian, forced to leave his home during the Istrian–Dalmatian exodus. After graduating from high school (classical lyceum), she enrolled in the faculty of law, but did not complete her studies.

== Political career ==
Lorenzin works with the local newspaper "Il Giornale di Ostia", before entering politics, joining in 1996 a local section of the youth movement of Forza Italia, the liberal conservative political party led by media magnate Silvio Berlusconi. In October 1997 was elected to the council of Rome's 13th district. In April 1999 she became regional coordinator of the FI's youth movement. In May 2001, she was also elected town councilor of Rome, for the centre-right coalition. In 2005 she was appointed coordinator of the Lazio group of Forza Italia and served in the post until 2006.

In the 2008 general election, Lorenzin was elected for the first time in the Chamber of Deputies, running in the centre-right People of Freedom, the new party led by Berlusconi. During the legislature she was a member of the Constitutional Affairs Commission and became a notable politician of the centre-right coalition.

=== Minister of Health ===
She was re-elected deputy in the 2013 general election; the elections resulted in a hung parliament, and no political coalitions had a majority of seats to govern alone. So the two main parties, the centre-left Democratic Party, the centre-right People of Freedom, supported by the centrist Civic Choice, established a Grand coalition government, led by the vice secretary of the PD, Enrico Letta.

On 28 April 2013 Lorenzin was appointed Minister of Health in the grand coalition cabinet. Lorenzin succeeded Renato Balduzzi, an independent, who served in the technocratic government of Mario Monti.

In May 2013 as Minister of Health she approved the decision to start testing the Stamina therapy, a controversial alternative "medical treatment" invented by Italian former professor of psychology. In that period rose up an intense pressure from the media and an increasingly insistent pro-Stamina street demonstrations; while the Italian and international scientific community contested the government's decision. However the tests ended in October 2014.

In November 2013, Lorenzin and other People of Freedom ministers, known as "doves", who were strong supporters of Letta's government, refused to join the new Forza Italia (FI), founded upon the dissolution of the PdL by Berlusconi. All five PdL ministers, three under-secretaries, 30 senators and 27 deputies immediately joined a new party called New Centre-Right, led by the Interior Minister Angelino Alfano.

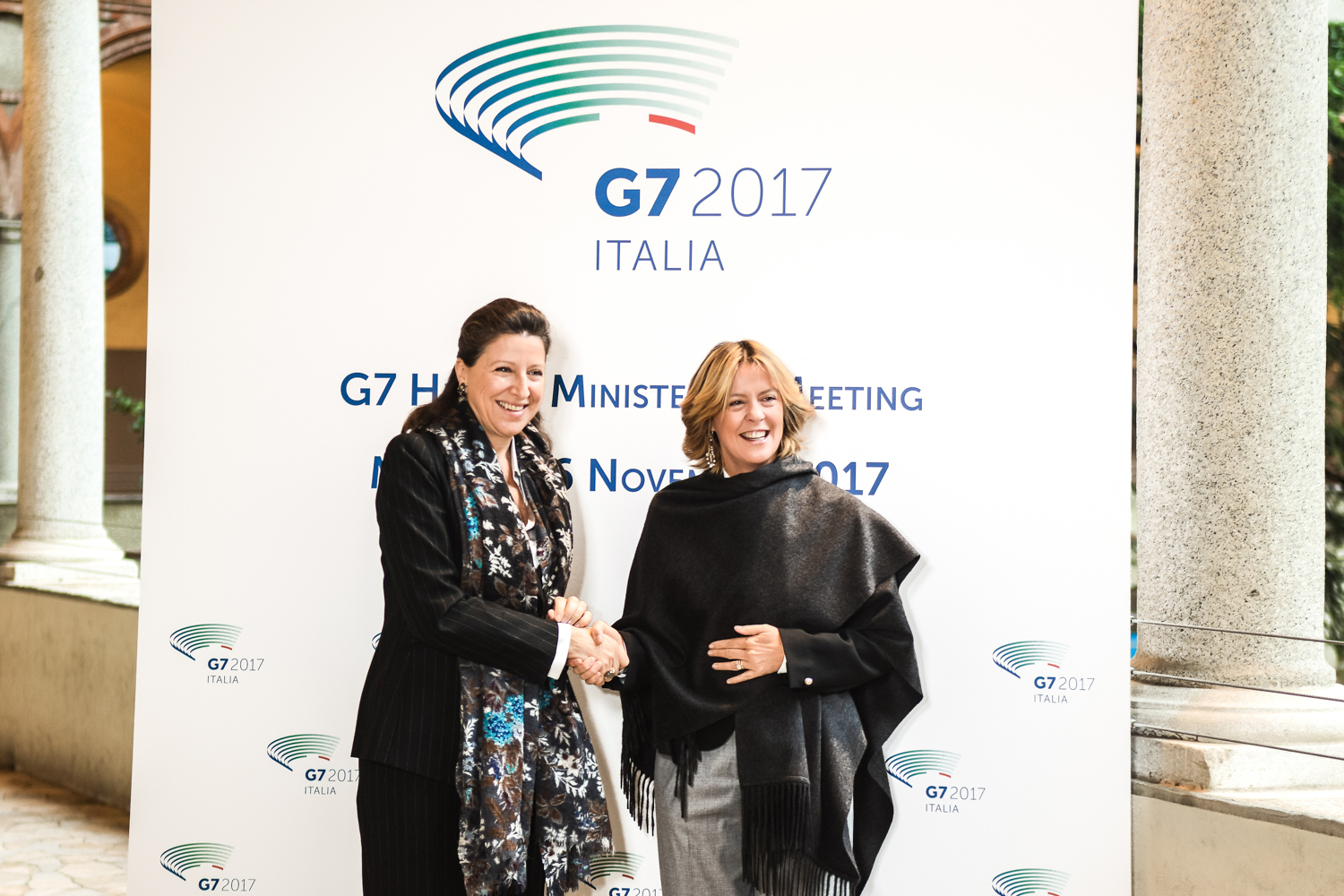
Lorenzin with her French counterpart Agnès Buzyn, in November 2017.

On 13 February 2014, following tensions with his rival and new Secretary of the Democratic Party, Matteo Renzi, Letta announced he would resign as Prime Minister the following day. On 22 February Renzi was sworn in as Prime Minister and Lorenzin was confirmed as Health Minister.

In May 2014 Lorenzin ran for the European Parliament in Central Italy, gained merely 33,437 votes and therefore was not elected.

In June 2016 Lorenzin supported Alfio Marchini (as well supported by Silvio Berlusconi) as a candidate to become Mayor of Rome: in this occasion Lorenzin party had a disastrous electoral result, gathering just 15.458 votes in all Rome area (1,29% of total)

On 12 December 2016, when Renzi resigned as Prime Minister after the constitutional referendum, Lorenzin was confirmed as Health Minister by the new Prime Minister Paolo Gentiloni, member of the same political party of Renzi(PD).

In March 2017 she joined Alfano's new centrist party, Popular Alternative (AP).

On 19 May 2017, the Council of Ministers, on her proposal, approved a decree law containing urgent vaccine prevention measures that reintroduces the mandatory vaccination, bringing the number of mandatory vaccines from 4 to 12 and not allowing those who have not been vaccinated to attend school.

In December 2017 Alfano announced that he would not stand in the 2018 general election and Popular Alternative suffered the split of a large centre-right faction, whose members wanted to re-align with the centre-right coalition. The rump of the party continued its alliance with the Democratic Party, by formally entering the centre-left coalition, and, with Alfano's backing, Lorenzin, became AP's de facto leader on 17 December 2017. On 29 December she launched Popular Civic List, a centrist joint list formed by AP, Centrists for Europe, Solidary Democracy and Italy of Values; on the same day Lorenzin was elected leader.

Beatrice Lorenzin run in the general election of 4 March in Modena, a traditionally leftist area in Northern Italy, and has won only thanks to the vote of the Democratic Party, while her own list took only 0.5% of the votes.

In September 2019, Lorenzin joined the Democratic Party.

== Controversies ==
In August 2016 Beatrice Lorenzin announced the celebration of a 'Fertility day' for the following 22 September, but the images chosen for the campaign were perceived as offensive in Italy and abroad. A second pamphlet issued by the Ministry after the first controversy raised a further wave of outrage as perceived as racist. The pamphlet was withdrawn and the responsible for the communication of the Ministry, Daniela Rodorigo, was fired in September 2016.

Political offices
Preceded by Renato Balduzzi	Italian Minister of Health; 2013–2018	Succeeded by Giulia Grillo
