= Ferdinando Adornato =

Italian politician (born 1954)

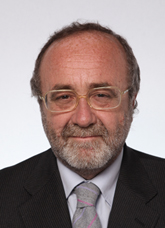

Secretary of the Chamber of Deputies
- In office 21 March 2013 – 22 March 2018

President of the 7th Culture Commission of the Chamber of Deputies
- In office 21 June 2006 – 27 April 2006
- Preceded by: Giovanni Castellani
- Succeeded by: Pietro Folena

Member of the Chamber of Deputies
- In office 14 June 1994 – 22 March 2018

Personal details
- Born: 11 May 1954 (age 71) Fivizzano, Massa-Carrara, Italy
- Party: PCI (until 1978); AD (1992–1996); FI (2001–2008); UDC (2008–2016); CpE (2017–2018)
- Profession: Politician, journalist

Ferdinando Adornato (born 11 May 1954) is an Italian politician and journalist.

== Biography ==
On 8 June 1994, he founded and led the group Area, "an area of programmatic comparison ... inspired liberal, Christian and environmentalist ... elements as a bridge between the left opposition and the center opposition."

In March 1995, he founded and directed the monthly Liberal, which in May 1996 was supported by the Adeline Foundation.

In relation to the formation of The People of Freedom party from Forza Italia, he expressed his intention not to participate in this political project. He said: "This is not the unitary project we were working on, which should also include AN and UDC, but a personalistic party, the second edition of Forza Italia. Italy needs seriousness, and not improvisations, one can not dismiss a party and a political project in three minutes from the running board of a car."

== Judicial proceedings ==
Adornato was under investigation for illegal building along with his wife Maria Teresa Elia, as he proceeded, and obtained from four hundred feet square of excavation of a mound in a postwar building, adjacent to the "regular" apartment, in the Aventine District in Rome. According to Dia presented by the spouse of Adorno work was concerned only the "replacement of existing sewerage pipes and surface arrangement of the garden." The apartment, however, contains a sauna with swimming-pool for four people and a living room with kitchenette.
