= Middle Italy (political party) =

Middle Italy Italia di Mezzo
- Leader: Marco Follini
- Founded: 21 October 2006
- Dissolved: 14 October 2007
- Split from: Union of Christian and Centre Democrats
- Merged into: Democratic Party
- Ideology: Centrism; Christian left Christian democracy
- National affiliation: The Union
- European affiliation: None
- International affiliation: None

Website
- www.italiadimezzo.it

Middle Italy (Italia di mezzo, IdM) was a centrist Italian political grouping founded in 2006 by Marco Follini, Senate member and former leader of the Union of Christian and Centre Democrats (UDC, 2002–05), and Riccardo Conti, member of the Chamber of Deputies. Initially founded as a free political association in support of the "no" vote for the 2006 constitutional referendum, it became a party on 21 October 2006, after Follini announced his resignations from the UDC caucus.

The primary goal of this political movement was to attract all those voters who were unsatisfied by the Italian political system, based on the often harsh contraposition between the centre-left Union and the centre-right House of Freedoms, and to change, or, better, to produce the end of bi-polarism. However, IdM supported then-Prime Minister Romano Prodi in a confidence vote and then entered The Union.

Never having contested an election on its own, the party merged into the Democratic Party (PD) at its founding on 14 October 2007. Most of its members did not follow Follini in that decision and switched to the Third Pole, led by former Minister of the Interior Vincenzo Scotti.
