= Mario Baccini =

Italian politician (born 1957)

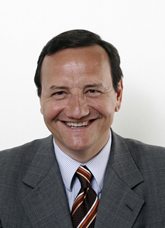

Mayor of Fiumicino
- Assuming office 17 May 2023
- Succeeding: Esterino Montino

Minister of Public Function
- In office 2 December 2004 – 17 May 2006
- Prime Minister: Silvio Berlusconi
- Preceded by: Luigi Mazzella
- Succeeded by: Luigi Nicolais

Member of the Chamber of Deputies
- In office 15 April 1994 – 28 April 2006
- In office 28 April 2008 – 14 March 2013

Member of the Senate
- In office 28 April 2006 – 28 April 2008

Personal details
- Born: 14 December 1957 (age 68) Rome, Italy
- Party: DC (until 1994); CCD (1994–2002); UDC (2002–2008); RpI (2008); PdL (2009–2013); NCD (2013–2017)
- Education: Libera Università Maria SS. Assunta

Mario Baccini (born 14 December 1957 in Rome) is an Italian politician, former member of the Union of Christian and Centre Democrats and promoter of the White Rose, incumbent mayor of Fiumicino since May 2023.

== Biography ==
He started his political activity as town councilor in Rome, for the Christian Democracy party (DC). In 1994, when DC disbanded, he joined the Christian Democratic Centre, which entered the Pole of Freedoms.

In the same year, he became president of the Christian Democratic Centre (CCD) parliamentary group at the Chamber of Deputies. Then he was secretary and national co-ordinator of the Christian Democratic Centre. In 2001 he was re-elected at the Parliament; in 2002 he joined the Union of Christian and Centre Democrats, the result of a merger between CCD, United Christian Democrats, and European Democracy.

In the Berlusconi II Cabinet he was sub-secretary of the Foreign Ministry from 2001 to 2004. On 3 December 2004, he became Minister of the Public Function. He was reconfirmed minister in Berlusconi III Cabinet from 2005 to 2006.

From 2006 to 2008 he was vice-president of the Senate.

On 30 January 2008, he left UDC and he founded the White Rose movement with Bruno Tabacci. He was candidated as mayor of Roma, taking just 0.8% of the votes. At Italian general election, the White Rose was in alliance with UDC and other Christian democrats movements into the Union of the Centre, and Baccini was elected to the Chamber of Deputies: he didn't join White Rose's parliamentary group, but rather he adhered to the mixed group.

On 14 May, during the parliament discussion about the motion of confidence to Berlusconi IV Cabinet, he announced to vote the confidence to the cabinet, leaving the project of the White Rose.

== See also ==
- White Rose
