= Composition of the regional councils of Italy =

Legislative bodies of Italian regions

The regional councils of Italy are the elected legislative bodies of Italian regions. Their political composition is summarized in the following table. Political parties active on national level are listed; the remaining ones are included into "others".

Party	LOM	SIC	TAA	SAR	PUG	CAM	VEN	LAZ	PIE	EMR	FVG	TOS	VDA	MAR	CAL	LIG	ABR	UMB	BAS	MOL	Total
PD	18	11	8	11	15	10	10	11	13	28	10	16	3	7	4	9	6	9	2 (Note: 1 councillor from the Democratic Basilicata group)	3	204
FdI	20	11	4	10	11	8 (Note: 1 councillor from the Reformists and Moderates group)	9	21	13	11	8	13	4	11	4	4	9	3	4	4	182
FI	11	13	2	6	5	7	3	6	7	2	3	2	3	3	11 (Note: 4 councillors sitting within the Occhiuto for President group)	3	5 (Note: 1 councillor from the NM group)	2	4 (Note: 1 councillor from the Lucanian Pride group)	4 (Note: 1 councillor from the Roberti for President group)	102
LSP	14	6	6	—N/a	4	2	19 (Note: 4 councillors from the Stefani for President group and 1 from the mixed group)	1	6	1	12 (Note: 3 councillors sitting within the Fedriga for President group)	—N/a	3	3	2	3	2	2	2	1	89
M5S	3	9	—N/a	8	4	6	1	3	3	1	1 (Note: Mixed group)	2	—N/a	1	2	1	2	1	2	3 (Note: 1 councillor from the Gravina for President group)	53
EV	—N/a	—N/a	1 (Note: Within the Green Group)	3 (Note: Within AVS)	—N/a	1	—N/a	—N/a	—N/a	1	—N/a	2	3	—N/a	—N/a	1	1	—N/a	—N/a	—N/a	13
IV	1	—N/a	—N/a	—N/a	—N/a	3 (Note: Within Reformist House (IV–NdC))	—N/a	2	1 (Note: Within SUE)	—N/a	—N/a	2 (Note: Within Reformist House)	—N/a	—N/a	1	—N/a	—N/a	—N/a	1	—N/a	11
NM	3 (Note: 2 councillors sitting within the Better Lombardy group)	1	—N/a	1 (Note: Within SaC – 20V)	—N/a	—N/a	—N/a	—N/a	—N/a	—N/a	—N/a	—N/a	—N/a	—N/a	2	2	—N/a	—N/a	—N/a	2	11
SI	1	—N/a	—N/a	—N/a	—N/a	1	—N/a	1 (Note: Within the Progressive Pole)	2	2	1	1	—N/a	—N/a	—N/a	—N/a	—N/a	1	—N/a	—N/a	10
A	—N/a	—N/a	—N/a	—N/a	—N/a	—N/a	1	1	1 (Note: Within Cirio for President)	—N/a	—N/a	—N/a	1 (Note: Within Autonomist Centre)	1 (Note: Within Ricci for President)	—N/a	—N/a	1	—N/a	2	—N/a	8
FN	3	—N/a	—N/a	—N/a	—N/a	—N/a	1	—N/a	—N/a	—N/a	1	1	—N/a	—N/a	1	1	—N/a	—N/a	—N/a	—N/a	8
UDC	—N/a	2 (Note: Within DC)	—N/a	1	—N/a	—N/a	1	1	—N/a	—N/a	1 (Note: Within Fedriga for President)	—N/a	—N/a	1	—N/a	—N/a	—N/a	—N/a	—N/a	—N/a	7
PSI	—N/a	—N/a	—N/a	1 (Note: Within OC)	1 (Note: Within Decaro for President)	2	—N/a	—N/a	—N/a	—N/a	—N/a	—N/a	—N/a	—N/a	—N/a	—N/a	—N/a	—N/a	1	—N/a	5
ScN	—N/a	4	—N/a	—N/a	—N/a	—N/a	—N/a	—N/a	—N/a	—N/a	—N/a	—N/a	—N/a	—N/a	—N/a	—N/a	—N/a	—N/a	—N/a	—N/a	4
NdC	—N/a	—N/a	—N/a	—N/a	—N/a	2	—N/a	—N/a	—N/a	—N/a	—N/a	—N/a	—N/a	—N/a	—N/a	—N/a	—N/a	—N/a	—N/a	—N/a	2
BP	—N/a	—N/a	—N/a	—N/a	—N/a	—N/a	—N/a	—N/a	—N/a	—N/a	—N/a	—N/a	—N/a	—N/a	—N/a	—N/a	—N/a	—N/a	—N/a	1	1
+E	—N/a	—N/a	—N/a	—N/a	—N/a	—N/a	—N/a	—N/a	—N/a	—N/a	—N/a	1	—N/a	—N/a	—N/a	—N/a	—N/a	—N/a	—N/a	—N/a	1
Pos	—N/a	—N/a	—N/a	—N/a	—N/a	—N/a	—N/a	—N/a	1	—N/a	—N/a	—N/a	—N/a	—N/a	—N/a	—N/a	—N/a	—N/a	—N/a	—N/a	1
Vita	—N/a	—N/a	1	—N/a	—N/a	—N/a	—N/a	—N/a	—N/a	—N/a	—N/a	—N/a	—N/a	—N/a	—N/a	—N/a	—N/a	—N/a	—N/a	—N/a	1
Volt	—N/a	—N/a	—N/a	—N/a	—N/a	1 (Note: Within Fico for President)	—N/a	—N/a	—N/a	—N/a	—N/a	—N/a	—N/a	—N/a	—N/a	—N/a	—N/a	—N/a	—N/a	—N/a	1
Others	6	13	48	19	11	8	6	4	4	4	11	1	18	4	4	7	5	3	3	3	182
Total seats	80	70	70	60	51	51	51	51	51	50	48	41	35	31	31	31	31	21	21	21	896
