= Popolarismo =

Political doctrine conceived by Luigi Sturzo

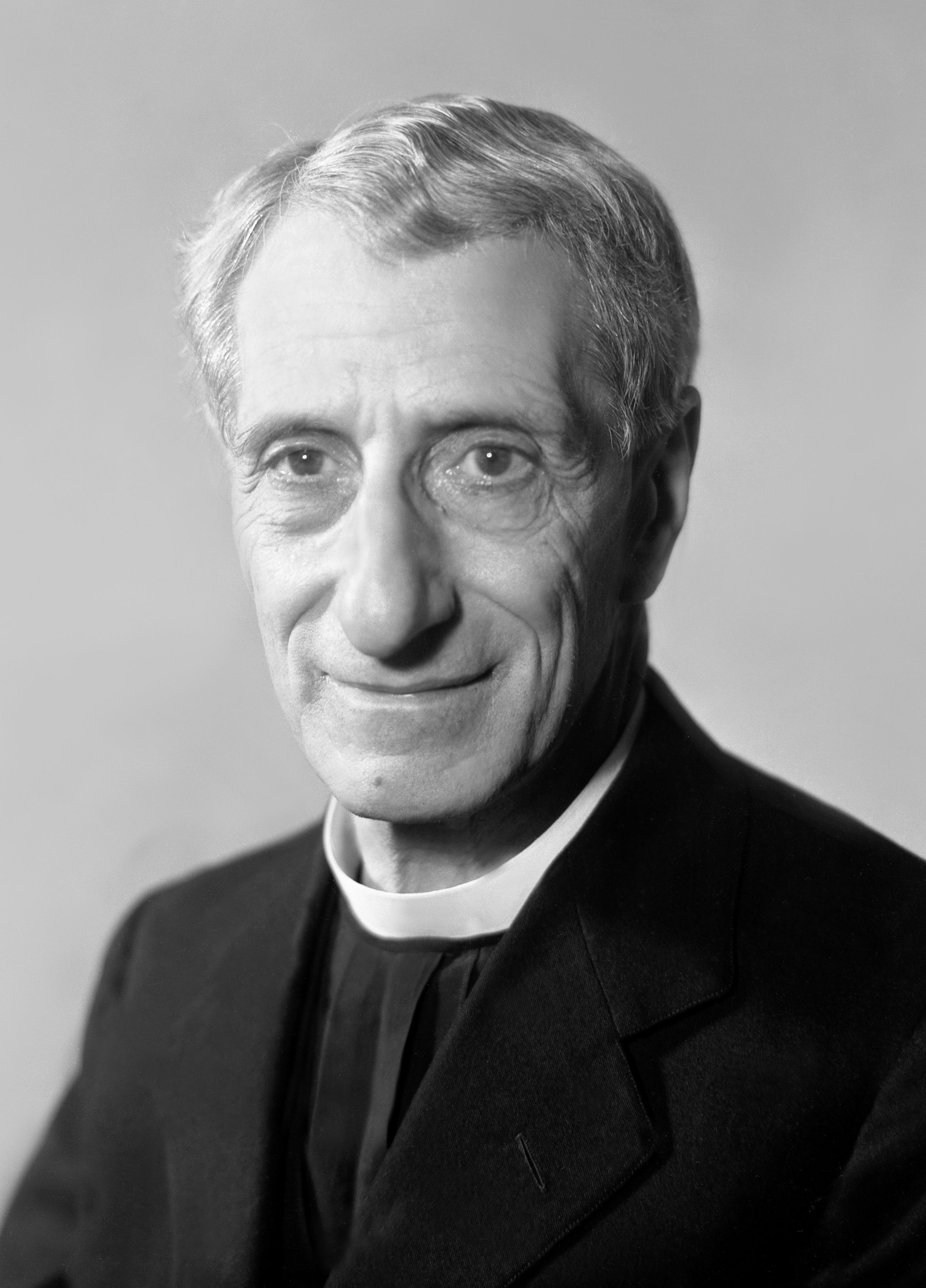
Popolarismo was formulated by Luigi Sturzo, an Italian Catholic priest and politician.

Popolarismo (English: Popularism) is the term Italian Catholic priest and politician Luigi Sturzo used to describe his political doctrine that formed the ideological basis for the Italian Popular Party and later Christian Democracy. In the Papal Encyclical Graves de Communi, (1901) Pope Leo XIII did not want Christian Democracy to enter the political sphere, and restricted it to social action. Sturzo developed Popularism as an alternative means of political action, which had an ideological focus on the people. As one academic notes:

To put it in a nutshell, Popularism was a political version of its predecessor, the prevalently social Christian Democracy.

In this European context, Popularism helped Catholics come to accept democratic institutions, alongside inspiring the French Popular Democratic Party (formed 1924), the Spanish Partido Social Popular, and the People and Freedom group (formed 1936), which Sturzo helped form in London. Sturzo outlined his conception of popularism as follows:

Popularism is democratic, but it differs from liberal democracy in that it denies the individualist and centralising system of the State and wishes the State to be organic and decentralised. It is liberal (in the wholesome sense of the word) because it takes its stand on the civil and political liberties, which it upholds as equal for all, without party monopolies and without persecution of religion, races or classes. It is social in the sense of a radical reform of the present capitalist system, but it parts company with socialism because it admits of private property while insisting on the social function of such property. It proclaims its Christian character because to-day there can be no ethics or civilisation other than Christian. Popularism was the antithesis of the totalitarian State.

In describing Popularism, Sturzo refers to the political program of the Italian Popular Party, which called for the state to recognize natural communities, such as the family, the classes and the communes, proportional representation and universal suffrage for women, for an elected senate to represent the managers, trade unions and academics, the decentralization of power and greater regional autonomy, freedom of religion, the demonopolisation of education, and pro workers legislation generally. The Popular Democratic Party's most significant theorist was Marcel Prélot, who was Struzo's French translator. He said the Popular Democratic Party:

called themselves démocrate populaires in spite of the slight pleonasm of the term in order to underline, on one hand, their determined adherence to government "for the people" and "by the people"; in order, on the other hand, to indicate their organic and anti-individualistic conception of social life.

Academics have noted that Popularism relates to the Christian Democratic notions of the people, and democracy.

The notion of the people is that the people extend beyond the working class, and actually encompasses the whole of society. But it is not a mass aggregation of individuals; the people is an organically unified community, but also internally diverse community. Christian Democratic parties have invoked the people when naming themselves "popular" or "People's Parties". In this invocation, Christian Democratic parties aim for two things. The first is to work towards a policy that is for the good of all the members of society as opposed to parties that promote the good of a specific group (i.e. class). The second refers to a society where the people live in a kind of harmony and where people and groups are interested in and care about each other. In practice, the specific religious nature of the Christian Democratic parties has enabled them to cut across the class divide.

The notion of the democracy that derives from this reflects the socio-economic diversity of people by advocating inclusive forms of democracy. This has led to the Christian Democratic call for proportional representation. Christian Democrats have also called for Pillarisation, where representatives are based on a vast array of complex social organizations ingrained in the fabric of society. Often, these organizations play an intermediary role to democracy.

In light of the 100th Anniversary of the Establishment of the Italian Popular Party, the Luigi Sturzo Institute has aimed to increase the general knowledge about the party, and noted that:

Popularism is characterized by the constructive capacity of new political forms, by the demand for institutional reforms and by the disposition to listen to changes in society.

Modern Christian Democrats have called for Popularism. In 2019, after a meeting with Pope Francis and Donald Tusk, Charles Michel noted the differences between Popularism (popolarismo) and Populism (populismo):

With Pope Francis we discussed the difference between 'populismo' and 'popolarismo' distinguishing the politics of 'pleasing the people' from the politics of 'for the people'. A key question for European Christian Democrats.

Donald Tusk, would later refer to this meeting at the European People's Party congress in Zagreb, and call for "responsible popularity" over "irresponsible populism". Pope Francis would later call for Popularism instead of Populism in a video message for the release of his book Let us Dream: The Path to a Better Future.

== See also ==
- Populares
- Pillarisation
- Proportional representation

== Citations and references ==
- Barry, Gearóid (2012). The Disarmament of Hatred: Marc Sangnier, French Catholicism and the Legacy of the First World War, 1914-45. Palgrave Macmillan. ISBN 978-0-230-37333-4.
- Campanini, Giorgio (1989). "Il Popolarismo Come Dottrina Politica". Il Politico. 54 (2): 219–230. JSTOR 43100928.
- Felice, Flavio (2001). "The Ethical Foundation of the Market Economy: A Reflection on Economic Personalism in the Thought of Luigi Sturzo". Journal of Markets and Morality. 4 (2): 217–239.
- Felice, Flavio; Sandonà, Luca (2019). "Luigi Sturzo's Socio-economic Development Theory and the Case of Italy: No Prophet in His Homeland". Law and Development. Singapore: Springer Singapore. pp. 31–49. ISBN 9789811394225.
- Hegstad, Eilev (2023). "Christian Democracy: English addendum to the Norwegian edited volume: Kristendemokrati". Konrad-Adenauer-Stiftung Nordic Countries.
- "Popularism". Istituto Luigi Sturzo. 2020. Archived from the original on 2020-09-30.
- Invernizzi Accetti, Carlo (2019). What is Christian Democracy?: Politics, Religion and Ideology. New York: Cambridge University Press. ISBN 9781108368162.
- Michel, Charles (2019). "Charles Michel". Twitter. Archived from the original on 2021-11-16.
- Papini, Roberto (1993). "Christianity and Democracy in Europe". In Witte, John (ed.). Christianity and Democracy in Global Context. ISBN 978-0-8133-1843-1.
- Prélot, Marcel (1962). "Histoire et doctrine due Parti Democrate Populaire". Politique. New series (19–20): 323.
- Rauch, Rufus William (1972). Politics and belief in contemporary France: Emmanuel Mounier and Christian democracy, 1932-1950. Netherlands: The Hague : Nijhoff. ISBN 9024712815.
- San Martín, Inés (2021-04-25). "Pope Francis proposes 'popularism' to counter populism". Crux.
- Sturzo, Luigi (1939). Church and state. New York: Longmans, Green and Co.
- Sturzo, Luigi (1926). Italy and Fascismo. Translated by Barbara, Barclay Carter. Faber and Gwyer.
- Tusk, Donald (2019). "Speech by President Donald Tusk at the EPP congress in Zagreb". European Council Council of the European Union. Archived from the original on 2019-11-20.
- van Kersbergen, Kees (1994). "The distinctiveness of Christian Democracy". In Hanley, David L. (ed.). Christian democracy in Europe : a comparative perspective. London: Pinter Publishers. pp. 31–47. ISBN 1-85567-086-0.
