= Democratic Populars =

Democratic Populars Popolari Democratici
- Leader: Pietro Squeglia
- Founded: 2008
- Dissolved: 2010
- Split from: Union of Democrats for Europe
- Merged into: Alliance for Italy
- Ideology: Christian democracy
- Political position: Centre

The Democratic Populars (Popolari Democratici) was a tiny Christian-Democratic political party based in Campania, Italy. It was led by Pietro Squeglia, a former deputy for the Italian People's Party and The Daisy.

== History ==
It was founded in February 2008 by splinters from the Union of Democrats for Europe who wanted to continue the alliance with centre-left The Union coalition. The party was joined by Nicola Caputo, Vittorio Insigne and Giuseppe Maisto, all three regional councillors of Campania, and several provincial and municipal ministers.

In 2010 the party joined the Alliance for Italy, a new party founded by Francesco Rutelli.
