= Alliance for Italy =

Italian political party

Alliance for Italy Alleanza per l'Italia
- President: Francesco Rutelli
- Vice President: Enrico Boselli
- Founded: 11 November 2009
- Dissolved: 2016
- Split from: Democratic Party
- Headquarters: Via di Campo Marzio, 46 – 00185 Rome
- Ideology: Centrism; Liberalism; Christian democracy Green politics
- Political position: Centre
- European affiliation: European Democratic Party

Website
- http://www.alleanzaperlitalia.it

Alliance for Italy (Italian: Alleanza per l'Italia; ApI) was a centrist political party in Italy.

The party, which was described in its manifesto as "democratic, liberal, popular" as opposed both to "right-wing populism" and the "social-democratic left", described as "an experience with high and memorable value, yet by now run out", was launched on 11 November 2009 by Francesco Rutelli, senator for the Democratic Party (PD) and former leader of Democracy is Freedom – The Daisy (DL). The core of the party was composed by the Free Democrats, the faction Rutelli launched some months before leaving the PD.

Most of the early party members were liberals and Christian democrats coming from the PD, including Linda Lanzillotta, Gianni Vernetti and Donato Mosella or disgruntled centrists from Italy of Values, like Pino Pisicchio.

The party was officially disbanded by the end of 2016.

== History ==
=== Background ===
Francesco Rutelli, who, as leader of Democracy is Freedom – The Daisy, was instrumental in the foundation of the Democratic Party (PD), became soon uncomfortable with it because he saw as too stretched on the left. In September 2009, when he was a guest at a party convention of the Union of the Centre (UdC) of Pier Ferdinando Casini, he told the press that he was interested in an alliance with the new party Casini was organizing through the UdC. Rutelli's critical view of the PD was reinforced by the election of Pier Luigi Bersani as party leader in a primary election on 25 October 2009.

On 27 October, after months of speculation, Rutelli hinted that was leaving the PD. The core idea of Rutelli was that Italy needed a new "political proposal" in a time when the country was on the verge of splitting in two, with Lega Nord more than ever confident in the North and the possible emergence of the Party of the South: a scenario that could mean complete marginalization for the centre-left and its failure as a national political force.

=== Foundation ===
On 28 October Rutelli presented a "Manifesto for Change and Good Government" (Manifesto per il Cambiamento e il Buongoverno) along with other ten founding members. These included, among others, Lorenzo Dellai (President of the Province of Trento and leader of the Union for Trentino), Massimo Cacciari, (Mayor of Venice), Linda Lanzillotta (former Minister of Regional Affairs), Bruno Tabacci and Elvio Ubaldi. While Cacciari and Lanzillotta have been members of DL and then of the PD, Tabacci and Ubaldi are members of White Rose, a small outfit that was part of the Union of the Centre (UdC), led by Pier Ferdinando Casini.

For some days Rutelli lingered on whether he was leaving the PD or not because the strategic goal of his initiative was a stable alliance between the UdC and the Democrats, with Tabacci instrumental in that. However, on 31 October, through an interview to Corriere della Sera, Rutelli announced that it was his intention to leave the PD immediately. In the interview he remarked how in his view social democracy was "a historical experience that has no chance to speak to present-day people" and that his goal was to "unite democratic, liberal and popular forces" in order to "build, in some years time, the largest [political] force of the country".

On 8 December Tabacci left the UdC after that Casini had met with Berlusconi to discuss of justice reform and of an alliance between The People of Freedom and UdC in some regions. Tabacci, who said he was going to assemble his fellow members of the White Rose, explained that the new party would be "distant and alternative to the populism of Berlusconi and of the League" but open to centre-right voters. Casini soon foresaw a likely alliance between his party and ApI.

=== Early times ===
On 11 November 2010, along with many others, Rutelli presented the name and the provisional logo of the party.

On 11–12 December ApI organized its first assembly in Parma. During the convention, which was attended by François Bayrou, Guy Verhofstadt and Will Marshall, Rutelli confirmed that the new party is headed to merge with UdC some day and opened to an alliance with Gianfranco Fini, the President of the Chamber of Deputies who is increasingly uncomfortable with his party, The People of Freedom, and Silvio Berlusconi.

On 22 December the logo of the party was presented by Rutelli, Tabacci and the other ApI leading members during a press conference.

By January 2010 parliamentary groups of the party were formed in the Senate and the Chamber of Deputies.

In March Rutelli announced for April a national convention, in which the party would have been enlarged to greens and liberals. Between March and April Christian Democratic Refoundation party of Publio Fiori, a group of liberals led by Valerio Zanone, a former leader of the Italian Liberal Party, Democratic senator and leader of Liberal PD, and a group of greens led by Camillo Piazza, a former Green deputy, joined the Alliance.

In late March 2010 regional elections the party run joint lists with the UdC in most regions and run its own lists in only four regions: Marche (where it gained 2.0% of the vote and one regional councillor), Campania (3.0% and no councillors), Basilicata (4.2% and one councillor), and Calabria (2.2% and no councillors). The result was a little bit disappointing and the party had no real presence in the North.

This situation came into criticism by the Northern branches of the party, especially Union for Trentino (UpT) and Alliance for Veneto (ApV), launched by Massimo Calearo as a competitor of Liga Veneta–Lega Nord. Giorgio Lunelli, leading member of UpT, spoke for many Northern party members when he criticized the party's lack of interest for the North, called for Rutelli's resignation and proposed a confederal structure for the party. In September 2010 Calearo left ApI and ApV was disbanded.

=== New Pole for Italy ===
On 15 December 2010 ApI was a founding member of the New Pole for Italy (NPI) along with the Union of the Centre (UdC), Future and Freedom (FLI) and some minor parties. Also in December Enrico Boselli, long-time leader of the Italian Democratic Socialists and founder of the revived Italian Socialist Party, who had left active politics after his 2008 defeat, joined ApI and was soon appointed vice president of the party.

In November 2011 the party was joined by Santo Versace, a former Socialist coming from The People of Freedom (PdL). In January 2012 Luigi Fabbri, also a former Socialist passed through the PdL joined. In February Cristina De Luca replaced a deceased Democratic senator, but, instead joining the PD's group, she joined ApI. With Versace, Fabbri and De Luca the party had seven deputies and seven senators.

In May 2012 the party obtained notable results in Campania: 17.5% in Torre Annunziata, 4.6% in Torre del Greco, and 7.3% in San Giorgio a Cremano. The result was however grim for the NPI as a whole and Pier Ferdinando Casini, leader of UdC, the coalition's largest party, hinted that the alliance was out-of-date.

As a result, in June 2012 two heavyweights, Linda Lanzillotta and Gianni Vernetti, left the party. According to the former, ApI had become a "personal party". In July also Versace left the party, but his exit was counterbalanced by the entry of Giuseppe Vatinno, who had switched from Italy of Values (IdV).

=== To the centre-left and back ===
In September 2012 Rutelli started to re-position the party within the centre-left coalition, aiming at making the ApI its liberal and centrist component. Rutelli also stated that he aimed to represent a "new environmentalism". In October 2012 Riccardo Milana, a leading centrist, left in order to join the UdC. In November 2012, Tabacci, a leading member of the ApI and Christian democrat, ran in the centre-left primary election for becoming the Prime Minister candidate of the centre-left.

On 28 December 2012, in the run-up to the 2013 Italian general election, Tabacci announced an agreement with Rights and Freedom, a splinter group from IdV, and the formation of Democratic Centre (CD) as centrist wing of the Italy. Common Good coalition. Rutelli and other party's bigwigs were present at first press conference of the new electoral list. Subsequently, the ApI's sub-group in the Chamber changed its name to "Democratic Centre". Most leading members and incumbent MPs of ApI (Tabacci, Pino Bicchielli, Francesco Bruno, Cristina De Luca, Luigi Fabbri, Vincenzo Iovine, Vilma Mazzocco, Donato Mosella, Pino Pisicchio, Giacinto Russo, etc.) joined CD, while Rutelli chose not to be a candidate and announced that ApI would return for the 2014 European Parliament election. Lorenzo Dellai, former member and coordinator of ApI, became a leading supporter and the practical leader of Mario Monti's Civic Choice (SC).

In the election, Tabacci, Pisicchio, Bruno and Roberto Capelli (ApI regional leader in Sardinia) were elected for CD, while Dellai and Lanzillotta were elected for SC. Of the four elects for CD, only Bruno chose to remain within ApI and, consequently, did not join the CD sub-group in the Chamber of Deputies.

=== 2014 EP election and current inactivity ===
After the 2013 election, Rutelli started to re-organize the party, along with the sole vice president left, Enrico Boselli, and the only MP, Franco Bruno. Through the European Democratic Party (EDP), of which Rutelli is co-president, and an alliance with the Alliance of Liberals and Democrats for Europe Party (ALDE Party), the ApI planned to field a liberal, green and Europeanist list for the 2014 European Parliament election. This list did not emerge; however Democratic Centre was part of the ALDE-supporting European Choice list for the election, which received 0.7% of the vote and failed to win any seats in the European Parliament.

In the 2015 regional elections the party fielded candidates, within larger electoral lists, in Campania and Calabria.

The party was officially disbanded by the end of 2016.

== Leadership ==
- President: Francesco Rutelli (2009–2016)
  - Vice President: Pino Pisicchio (2010–2013), Enrico Boselli (2010–2016)
- Coordinator: Lorenzo Dellai (2009–2013)
- President of the National Council: Bruno Tabacci (2010–2013)
- Spokesperson: Bruno Tabacci (2009–2010), Linda Lanzillotta (2010–2012)
- Party Leaders in the Chamber of Deputies: Bruno Tabacci (2010–2011), Pino Pisicchio (2011–2013)
- Party Leaders in the Senate: Giacinto Russo (2010–2011), Francesco Rutelli (2011–2013)
- Party Leader in the European Parliament: Vincenzo Iovine (2010–2013)
