= Democratic Centre (Italy) =

Democratic Centre Centro Democratico
- President: Bruno Tabacci
- Secretary: Margherita Rebuffoni
- Founded: 28 December 2012; 13 years ago
- Merger of: Rights and Freedom; Part of Alliance for Italy
- Headquarters: Via Pierluigi da Palestrina 63, Rome
- Ideology: Christian left Social liberalism
- Political position: Centre to centre-left
- National affiliation: Centre-left coalition
- Chamber of Deputies: 1 / 400
- Senate: 0 / 200
- European Parliament: 0 / 76
- Regional Councils: 0 / 896

Website
- www.ilcentrodemocratico.it

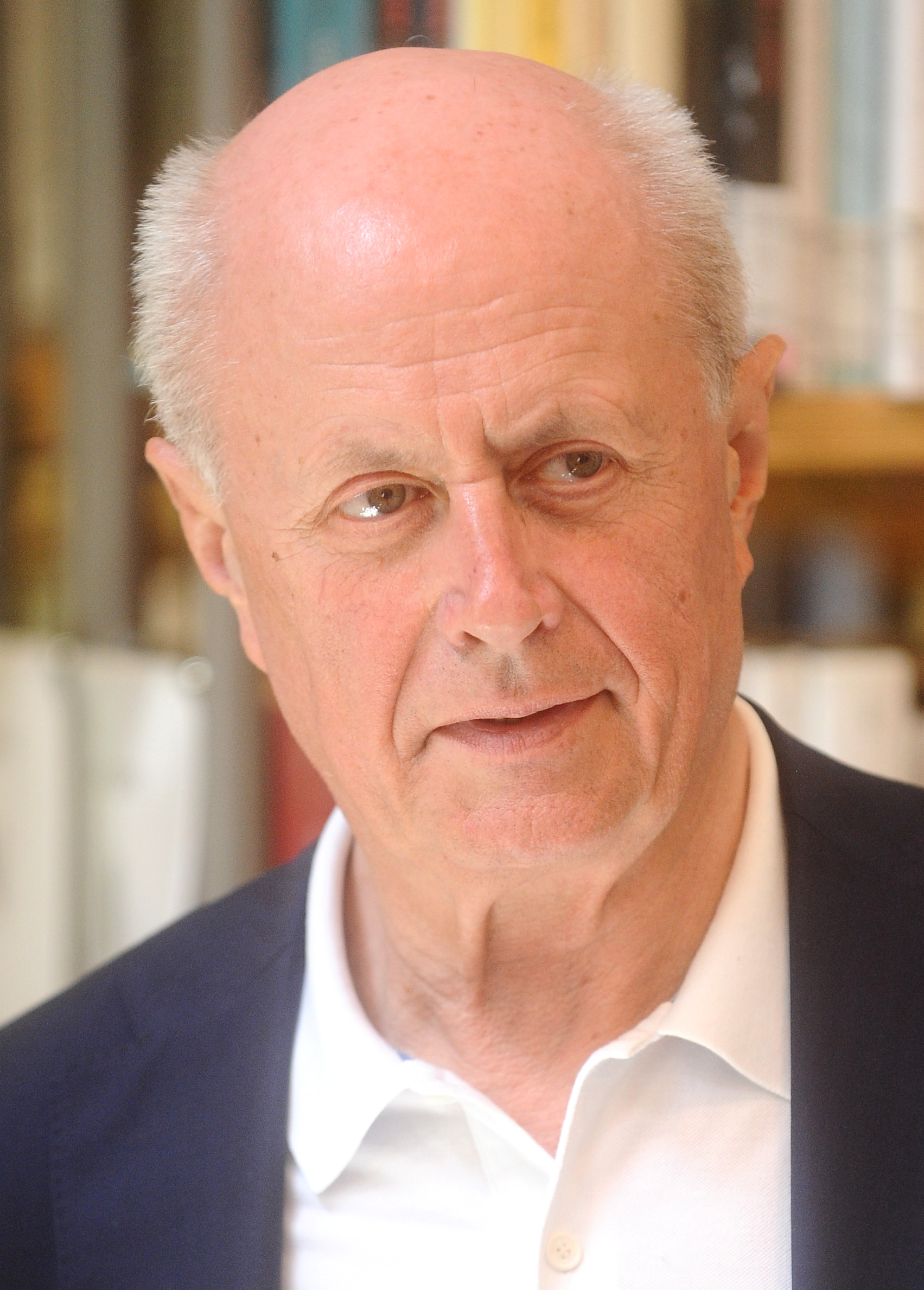
Party leader Bruno Tabacci.

Democratic Centre (Italian: Centro Democratico, CD) is a centrist, Christian leftist and social-liberal political party in Italy. Most of its members, including its leader Bruno Tabacci, are former Christian Democrats. Since its beginnings, the CD has been also part of the centre-left coalition, centred around the Democratic Party (PD).

The CD, along with the Italian Radicals and Forza Europa, was a founding member of More Europe (+E), a liberal party. As such, it was indirectly a member of the Alliance of Liberals and Democrats for Europe Party (ALDE Party) at the level of European Union. The CD had formed a partnership with the ALDE Party since the 2014 European Parliament election.

== History ==
=== Foundation and 2013 general election ===
The party was launched on 28 December 2012 as an electoral list and immediately joined Italy. Common Good, a centre-left coalition formed to contest the 2013 general election. The CD originally included large chunks of Alliance for Italy (ApI), led by Francesco Rutelli and Bruno Tabacci, and Rights and Freedom (DL), a breakaway group from Italy of Values (IdV) led by Massimo Donadi. Regarding ApI, most leading members and incumbent MPs of the party joined the CD, with Tabacci as their leader, while Rutelli chose not to be a candidate and retired from active politics.

Tabacci participated in the 2012 centre-left primary election, where he obtained only 1.4% of the vote. After his defeat, Tabacci supported the winner Pier Luigi Bersani of the Democratic Party (PD). In the general election the CD gained 0.5% of the vote both for the Chamber of Deputies and the Senate, returning six deputies (Franco Bruno, Roberto Capelli, Anielo Formisano, Carmelo Lo Monte, Pino Pisicchio and Tabacci). In the event, the party was stronger in Basilicata (4.4%), Calabria (2.0%), and Apulia (1.5%). In the subsequent Basilicata regional election the CD–United Populars joint list, won 5.0% of the vote and ex-IdV Nicola Benedetto was re-elected to the Regional Council.

=== 2014 EP election, alliances and splits ===
For the 2014 European Parliament election, the CD formed, along with Civic Choice (SC) and Act to Stop the Decline (FFD), European Choice (SE), an electoral list in support of the Alliance of Liberals and Democrats for Europe Party, including also the Italian Liberal Party (PLI), the Italian Republican Party (PRI), Liberal Democratic Alliance for Italy (ALI), the Conservatives and Social Reformers (CSR), the European Federalist Party (PFE) and miscellaneous minor movements. The list, whose top candidate in the South was Tabacci, received just 0.7% of the vote and failed to return any MEPs.

In June 2014, Pisicchio, the party's vice president, left over disagreements with Tabacci. Also In October, the other vice president, Formisano, left the CD and returned to IdV. As of late 2014, of the six deputies elected by the CD in 2013 only two (Tabacci and Capelli) were still active in the party (Bruno remained loyal to ApI all the way and never joined the CD, while Lo Monte ended up in the Italian Socialist Party).

In November 2014, the CD formed a joint group with Solidary Democracy (DemoS), an alike outfit formed by splinters from SC and later the Populars for Italy (PpI), led by Lorenzo Dellai and Andrea Olivero. Earlier that year, the party had locally formed various centrist alliances with DemoS, SC, the Union of the Centre (UdC) and/or Reality Italy for the 2014 and 2015 regional elections (two regional councillors were elected in Campania).

In late 2015, Domenico Rossi, a retired general, deputy (SC and PpI) and undersecretary of Defence (Renzi Cabinet and later Gentiloni Cabinet), joined the CD. In January 2017 Mario Catania, a former minister of Agriculture, member of the UdC and later of SC, became the party's fourth deputy.

In the 2017 local elections the party fielded lists in a few places, obtaining distinctive results in Torre Annunziata, Campania (12.7%) and Paola, Calabria (4.6%).

=== More Europe and 2018 general election ===
In January 2018, the CD joined More Europe (+E), a liberal electoral list previously formed by the Italian Radicals and Forza Europa, seeking to be part of the centre-left coalition in the upcoming 2018 general election. The decision, taken for technical reasons, was a departure form the CD's alliance with DemoS. The list won 2.6% of the vote in the election, falling short of the 3% threshold, but Tabacci was re-elected to the Chamber in a single-seat constituency in Milan.

In January 2019, the party elected Roberto Capelli as its secretary and participated in the establishment of +E as a party.

In September 2019, +E decided not to support the newly formed Conte II Cabinet, despite opposition by Tabacci and the party's two other deputies. The three voted in favour in the Chamber, while Emma Bonino against in the Senate. Consequently, Tabacci led his CD out of +E.

In January 2020, Margherita Rebuffoni replaced Capelli as secretary, while Sanza continued as vice president.

In November 2021, Tabacci formed a joint sub-group in the Mixed Group of the Chamber along with other three deputies, two of whom elected by Italians abroad. The sub-group was consequently named "Democratic Centre–Italians in Europe". The sub-group was later joined by several independent deputies and, at its height, it included 15 members, mostly former members of the Five Star Movement. The CD was also instrumental in the formation of a new group in the Senate named Europeanists, whose complete name was Europeanists–MAIE–Democratic Centre, and senator Gregorio de Falco briefly joined the party. In June 2022, the CD sponsored the formation of the senatorial group of Luigi Di Maio's Together for the Future.

== Election results ==
=== Italian Parliament ===
Election	Leader	Chamber of Deputies					Senate of the Republic				
Election	Leader	Votes	%	Seats	+/–	Position	Votes	%	Seats	+/–	Position
2013	Bruno Tabacci	167,072	0.49	6 / 630	New	11th	163,375	0.53	0 / 315	New	11th
2018	Bruno Tabacci	Into +E		1 / 630	▼5	7th	Into +E		0 / 315	0	7th
2022	Bruno Tabacci	Into IC		1 / 400	0	15th	Into IC		0 / 200	0	15th

=== European Parliament ===
Election	Leader	Votes	%	Seats	+/–	EP Group
2014	Bruno Tabacci	Into SE		0 / 73	New	–
2019	Bruno Tabacci	Into +E		0 / 76	0	–

=== Regional Councils ===
Region	Last election	# of overall votes	% of overall vote	# of overall seats won	+/–
Aosta Valley	2018	—N/a	—N/a	0 / 35	–
Piedmont	2019	34.993 (with More Europe)	1.82 (#9) (with More Europe)	0 / 50	–
Lombardy	2018	108,745 (#8) (with More Europe)	2.07 (with More Europe)	0 / 80	–
South Tyrol	2018	—N/a	—N/a	0 / 35	–
Trentino	2018	—N/a	—N/a	0 / 35	–
Veneto	2015	—N/a	—N/a	0 / 51	–
Friuli-Venezia Giulia	2018	—N/a	—N/a	0 / 49	–
Emilia-Romagna	2020	(with Bonaccini List)	(with Bonaccini List)	0 / 50	–
Liguria	2015	—N/a	—N/a	0 / 31	–
Tuscany	2015	—N/a	—N/a	0 / 41	–
Marche	2015	into UdC	into UdC	0 / 31	–
Umbria	2019	—N/a	—N/a	0 / 20	–
Lazio	20th	48,748 (#12)	1.7	1 / 51	▲1
Abruzzo	2014	16,962 (#10)	2.5	1 / 31	▲1
Molise	2013	—N/a	—N/a	0 / 21	–
Campania	2015	62,975 (#9) (with SC)	2.8 (with SC)	1 / 51	▲1
Apulia	2015	99,021 (#8) (with UdC and RI)	6.2 (with UdC and RI)	0 / 51	–
Basilicata	2013	11,938 (#9)	5.1	0 / 21	–
Calabria	2014	26,831 (#11)	3.4	0 / 30	–
Sicily	2017	—N/a	—N/a	0 / 70	–
Sardinia	2014	14,451 (#14)	2.1	2 / 60	▲2

== Leadership ==
- President: Bruno Tabacci (2013–present)
- Vice President: Pino Pisicchio (2013–2014), Aniello Formisano (2013–2014), Elena Torri (2015–2020), Angelo Sanza (2015–2022)
- Secretary: Roberto Capelli (2019–2020), Margherita Rebuffoni (2020–present)
- Head of Political Bureau: Angelo Sanza (2013–2015), Carlo Romano (2015–2020)
- Coordinator: Pino Bicchielli (2013–2015), Maurizio Bertucci (2015), Carlo Romano (2015–2020)
- Spokesperson: Vilma Mazzocco (2013)

== Symbol ==
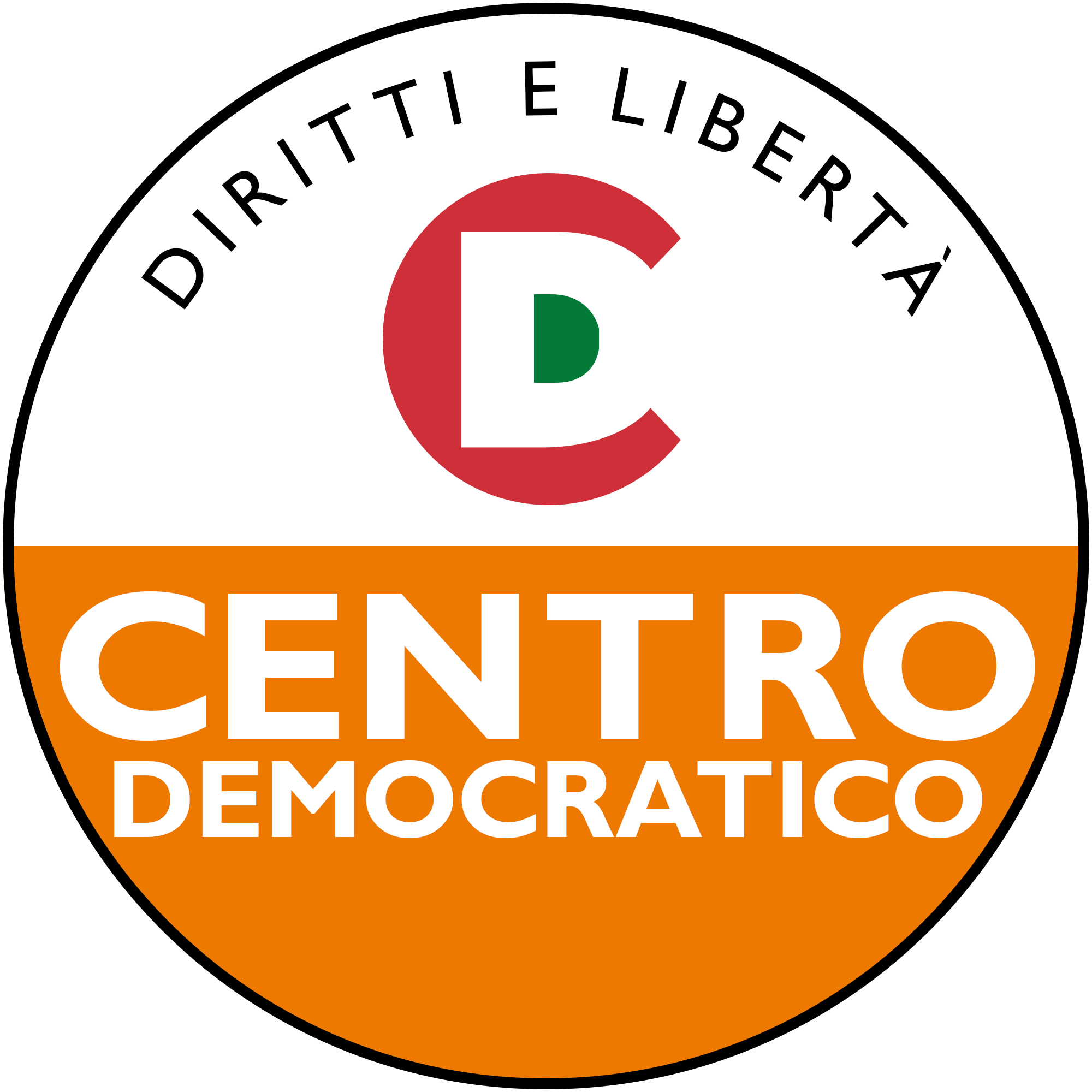
2012–2015

2015–
