= Rights and Freedom =

Italian political party

Rights and Freedom (Diritti e Libertà, DL) was an Italian political party. It was founded on 22 November 2012 by a splinter group from Italy of Values (IdV). The party's spokesperson was Massimo Donadi, IdV floor leader in the Chamber of Deputies from 2006 to 2012.

DL included four deputies (Massimo Donadi, Nello Formisano, Giovanni Paladini and Gaetano Porcino) and one senator (Stefano Pedica), all former members of IdV.

The party took inspiration from the late Action Party (Pd'A) and, following its foundation, aimed at being part of the centre-left coalition Italy. Common Good. DL was consequently a founding member of Democratic Centre (CD), the centrist component of Italy. Common Good in December 2012. DL also had close ties with the editorial committee of Reformist Moderates, a liberal and social-democratic movement-newspaper directed by Giorgio Benvenuto (a former secretary of the Italian Socialist Party) and, consequently, with the Moderates of Giacomo Portas (an independent deputy of the Democratic Party). The party was absorbed into CD sometime in 2013.

== Leadership ==
- Spokesperson: Massimo Donadi
