= Nello Formisano =

Italian politician

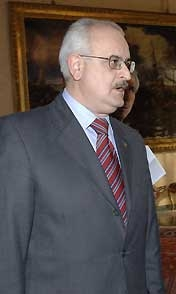
Nello Formisano

Aniello "Nello" Formisano (born 10 June 1954) is an Italian politician and lawyer.

Born in Torre del Greco, Province of Naples, Formisano graduated in law and has been also a SIAE representative.

In the general election of 2001 he was elected senator in the uninominal constituency "Portici-San Giorgio" (in Campania) as member of The Daisy (with the support of The Olive Tree). In 2005 he left The Daisy to join the Italy of Values (IdV) party, led by Antonio Di Pietro.

In the general elections of 2006 he was re-elected to the Senate among the ranks of the Democrats of the Left (DS) in the Umbria region (thanks to an agreement between IdV and DS). In the 2008 general elections he was elected to the Chamber of Deputies, in the "Campania 1" constituency.

In 2012, following strong internal controversy within the IdV, Formisano and Massimo Donadi left the party and founded Rights and Freedom. This movement then merged into the Democratic Centre, a new centrist party founded by Bruno Tabacci, to which Donadi and Formisano also belong. In the general election of 2013 he was again candidate to the Chamber of Deputies, and he was re-elected. On 30 October 2014 Formisano decided to join the Italy of Values again. Following the decision of IdV to support the re-candidacy of Luigi de Magistris as mayor of Naples, Formisano left the party again and joined to the Moderates of Giacomo Portas. On 9 February 2017 he joined the Civics and Innovators group, while on 28 February of the same year he left the Moderates and the Civics and Innovators's group to join the Democratic and Progressive Movement.

On the occasion of the 2018 municipal elections he ran for mayor of Torre del Greco, but he was not elected.
