= Solidary Democracy =

Italian political party

Solidary Democracy Democrazia Solidale
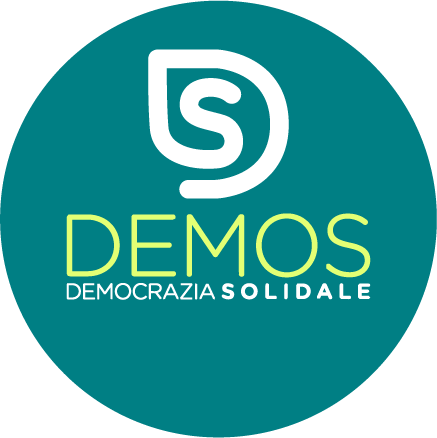
- Secretary: Paolo Ciani
- President: Mario Giro
- Founded: 4 July 2014; 12 years ago 6 October 2018; 7 years ago (re-organisation)
- Split from: Populars for Italy
- Headquarters: Via Panfilo Castaldi 9, Rome
- Ideology: Christian left
- Political position: Centre-left
- National affiliation: Coalition: Centre-left coalition Political party: Democratic Party (since 2019)
- European Parliament group: Progressive Alliance of Socialists and Democrats
- Colours: Teal
- Chamber of Deputies: 1 / 400 (Within PD-IDP) (Note: Paolo Ciani is a member.)
- Senate: 0 / 200
- European Parliament: 1 / 76 (Within the PD) (Note: Marco Tarquinio is a member.)
- Regional Councils: 0 / 896

Website
- democraziasolidale.it

Solidary Democracy (Italian: Democrazia Solidale, DemoS) is a Christian-leftist political party in Italy.

The party's early leader, Lorenzo Dellai has described it as a "Christian-social" party. DemoS is led by Paolo Ciani. Several party members, including Ciani, hail from the Community of Sant'Egidio.

DemoS maintains solid relations with the Democratic Party. It also had relations with a number of alike minor parties/groups of the Christian left, notably including the Democratic Centre (with which DemoS formed a joint parliamentary group in the Chamber of Deputies in 2014–2018), the Christian Popular Union (active mainly in Sardinia) and the Union for Trentino (Dellai's long-time party in Trentino, of which he was President in 1999–2012).

== History ==
DemoS was formed in July 2014, following the split of the left-wing faction from the Populars for Italy (PpI). The party, led by Lorenzo Dellai, Andrea Olivero, Mario Marazziti, Mario Giro and Lucio Romano, re-affirmed the strategic (not just tactical) alliance with Matteo Renzi's Democratic Party (PD), while the PpI considered it temporary and wanted to restructure the centre-right camp instead. At its start, the party counted eight deputies, two senators, one deputy minister and one undersecretary.

In November 2014, the "For Italy" group in the Chamber welcomed the two deputies of the Democratic Centre (CD). In December, the two senators of DemoS, Olivero and Romano, left the "For Italy" group, which was later disbanded, to join For the Autonomies, a miscellaneous group composed of minor autonomist and/or centre-left parties. In September a ninth deputy, Maurizio Baradello, joined the party and the parliamentary group; Baradello would die in May 2017.

In early 2015, Demos adopted a new symbol, Dellai was elected president of the party and Paolo Ciani coordinator.

In January 2016, the "For Italy" group changed its name to "Solidary Democracy – Democratic Centre", following a strengthening of the alliance with CD. In February, Giro, formerly an undersecretary, became deputy minister of Foreign Affairs; Giro was thus one of the party's two deputy ministers, along with Olivero at Agriculture.

In June and December 2017, respectively, Fucsia Nissoli and Gianluigi Gigli joined Forza Italia (FI) and Energies for Italy (EpI), both members of the centre-right coalition. For its part, DemoS was a founding member of the Popular Civic List (CP), a centrist electoral list within the centre-left coalition, along with Popular Alternative (AP), Italy of Values (IdV), the Centrists for Europe (CpE), Italy Is Popular (IP), the Union for Trentino (UpT) and the Christian Popular Union (UPC).

In the 2018 general election, CP obtained a mere 0.5% and no seats; thus, DemoS was excluded from Parliament. Moreover, Dellai was defeated in a single-seat constituency in Trentino. However, in the simultaneous 2018 regional election in Lazio, Ciani was elected regional councillor, at the head of a regional list named "Solidary Centre".

In October 2018, DemoS was re-launched, with the aim of creating a large Christian-leftist movement within the centre-left, at the presence of Andrea Riccardi, founder of the Community of Sant'Egidio, and Paolo Gentiloni, a leading Democrat, former Prime Minister and minister of Foreign Affairs. In the following months, the party was joined by some high-profile people, including Nello Formisano and Pietro Bartolo, while Michela Rostan, deputy of Article One, expressed her willingness to represent Demo.S in the Parliament.

In the 2019 European Parliament election, the party ran with the PD resulting in the election Bartolo. In 2022, Beatrice Covassi replaced an outgoing MEP to become the party's second MEP.

In May 2022, the party held its first national congress. Ciani, until then coordinator, was elected secretary, while Giro was re-elected president.

In the 2022 general election, party leader Ciani was elected to the Chamber for the PD.

In the 2024 European Parliament election, the party ran with the PD and supported three candidates: Bartolo, Covassi and Marco Tarquinio. Despite the first two being incumbents, the only elect was the latter.

== Leadership ==
- President: Lorenzo Dellai (2015–2018), Mario Giro (2018–present)
- Coordinator/Secretary: Paolo Ciani (2015–present)

== Election results ==
=== Italian Parliament ===
Election	Leader	Chamber of Deputies				Senate of the Republic			
Election	Leader	Votes	%	Seats	+/–	Votes	%	Seats	+/–
2018	Paolo Ciani	Into CP		0 / 630	–	Into CP		0 / 315	–
2022	Paolo Ciani	Into PD–IDP		1 / 400	▲1	Into PD–IDP		0 / 200	–

=== European Parliament ===
Election	Leader	Votes	%	Seats	+/–	EP Group
2019	Paolo Ciani	Into PD		1 / 76	New	S&D
2024	Paolo Ciani	Into PD		1 / 76	0	S&D

== Symbol ==
2015–2018

2018–2022

Horizontal logo

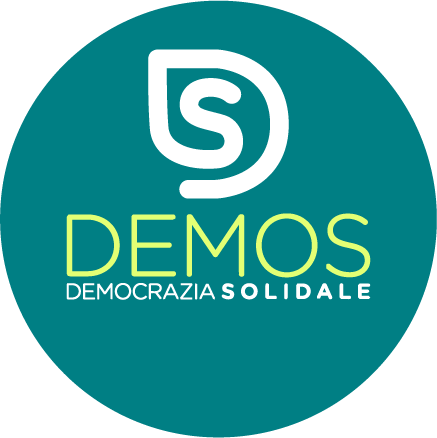
2022–present
