= Antonio Borghesi =

Italian politician (1949–2017)

Antonio Borghesi (Bolzano, 30 September 1949 – 23 February 2017) was an Italian politician from Veneto.

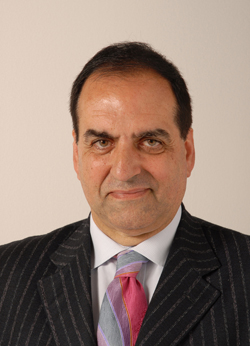
Antonio Borghesi

Borghesi, a university professor of economics, entered politics in 1995, when he was elected President of the Province of Verona supported by a coalition comprising Liga Veneta–Lega Nord, the Italian People's Party, Patto Segni and the Federation of the Greens. Having joined Liga Veneta–Lega Nord, he left the party in 1998 over the Venetist–Padanist controversy which led to the foundation of Liga Veneta Repubblica. Borghesi was a member of that party before switching to Italy of Values in 2000. Since 2006 he has been a member of the Italian Chamber of Deputies for Veneto.
