= Marco Tarquinio =

Italian politician (born 1958)

Marco Tarquinio MEP
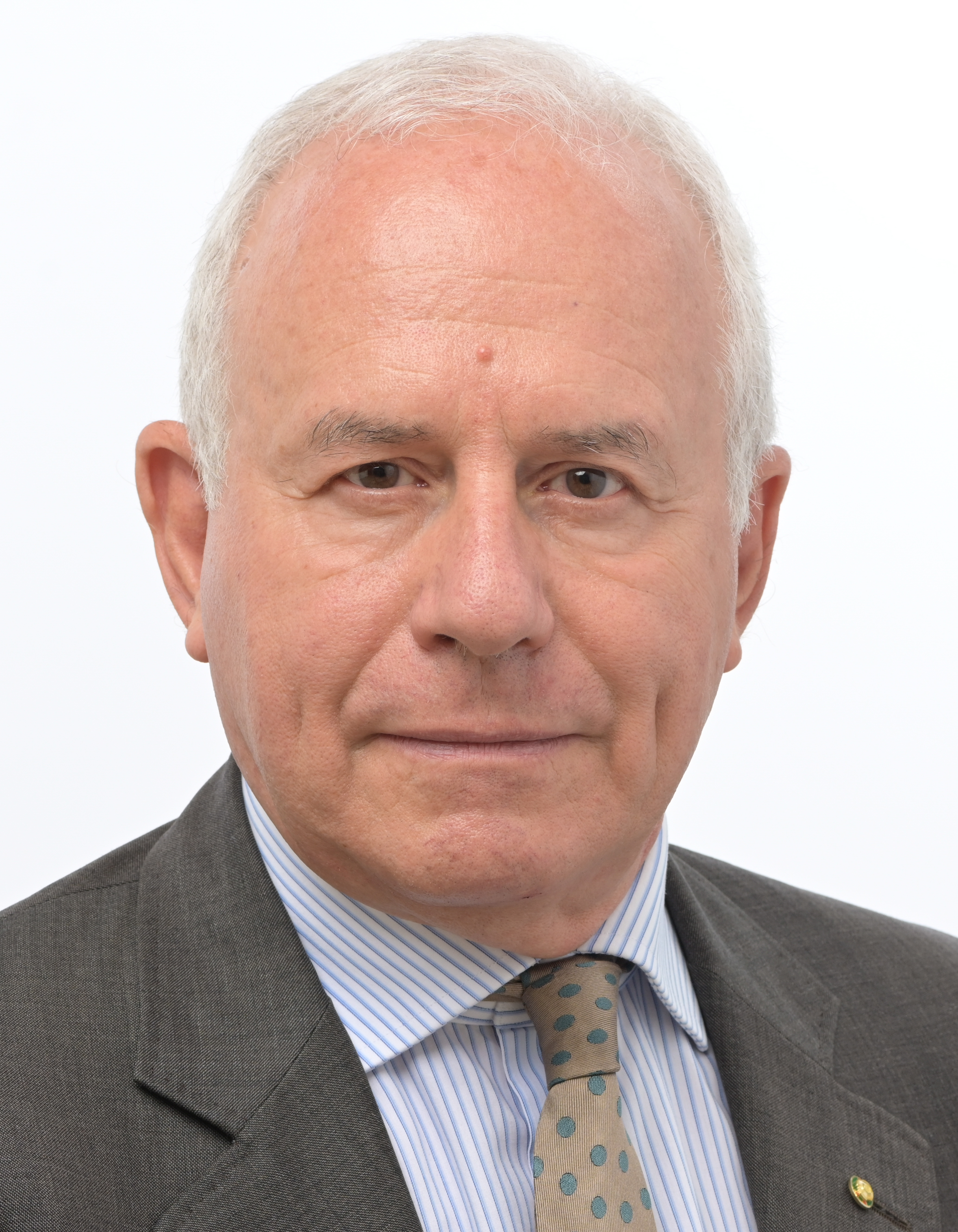
- Official Portrait, 2024

Member of the European Parliament for Central Italy
- Incumbent
- Assumed office 16 July 2024

Personal details
- Born: 16 March 1958 (age 68)
- Party: Solidary Democracy
- Other political affiliations: Party of European Socialists

Marco Tarquinio (born 16 March 1958) is an Italian journalist and politician of Solidary Democracy who was elected member of the European Parliament in 2024. He was the editor of Avvenire from 2009 to 2023.
