= Paolo Ciani =

Italian politician (born 1970)

Member of the Chamber of Deputies
- Incumbent
- Assumed office 13 October 2022
- Constituency: Rome

Personal details
- Born: 15 May 1970 Rome, Italy
- Party: Solidary Democracy
- Education: Sapienza University of Rome
- Profession: Politician

Paolo Ciani (born 15 May 1970) is an Italian politician.

== Biography ==
Graduated in history of art at the Sapienza University of Rome, he was Roman head of the Community of Sant'Egidio, of which he has been a member since he was 14 years old, and in this capacity he was twice elected secretary of the Council of Lay Aggregations for the Diocese of Rome. He worked as a researcher and between 2007 and 2010 he edited the section "La Città Solidale" for the monthly magazine Roma Capitale.

== Political career ==
In the 2018 regional election in Lazio, he stood as a candidate with the Solidary Centre list, in support of the candidacy of the outgoing president Nicola Zingaretti, and was elected with 5,735 preferences in the Regional Council of Lazio.

In view of the 2021 local elections, he stands in the centre-left primary elections to choose the candidate for mayor of Rome, obtaining 7.1% of the votes and coming in third place behind Roberto Gualtieri of the Democratic Party (60.4%) and Giovanni Caudo (15.6%). He was later elected city councilor in Rome with 1,607 preferences.

On 15 May 2022, during the first congress of Solidary Democracy, he was elected national secretary of the party.

In the general elections of 2022, he stood as a candidate for the Chamber of Deputies in the single-member constituency Lazio 1 – 01 for the centre-left coalition, resulting in being elected with 38.46% ahead of the candidate Maria Spena of the centre-right coalition (30.76%).

== Political views ==
He has expressed opposition to surrogacy, describing it as "a commodification of the body of poor women", but opposed the proposal of the centre-right coalition of turning it into a universal crime. He is also opposed to sending military aid to Ukraine during the Russian invasion and has voted against it, in dissent from his parliamentary faction.
