= 2012 Italian centre-left primary election =

2012 Italian election to determine the common candidate of the centre-left coalition

- 25 November, 2 December 2012
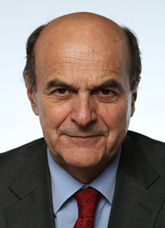

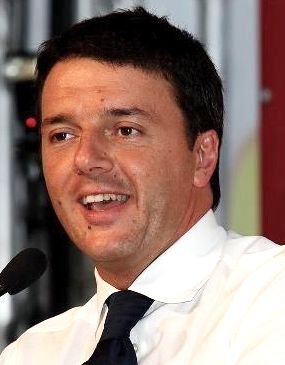
Nominee	Pier Luigi Bersani	Matteo Renzi
Party	Democratic Party	Democratic Party
Popular vote	1,706,457	1,095,925
Percentage	60.9%	39.1%
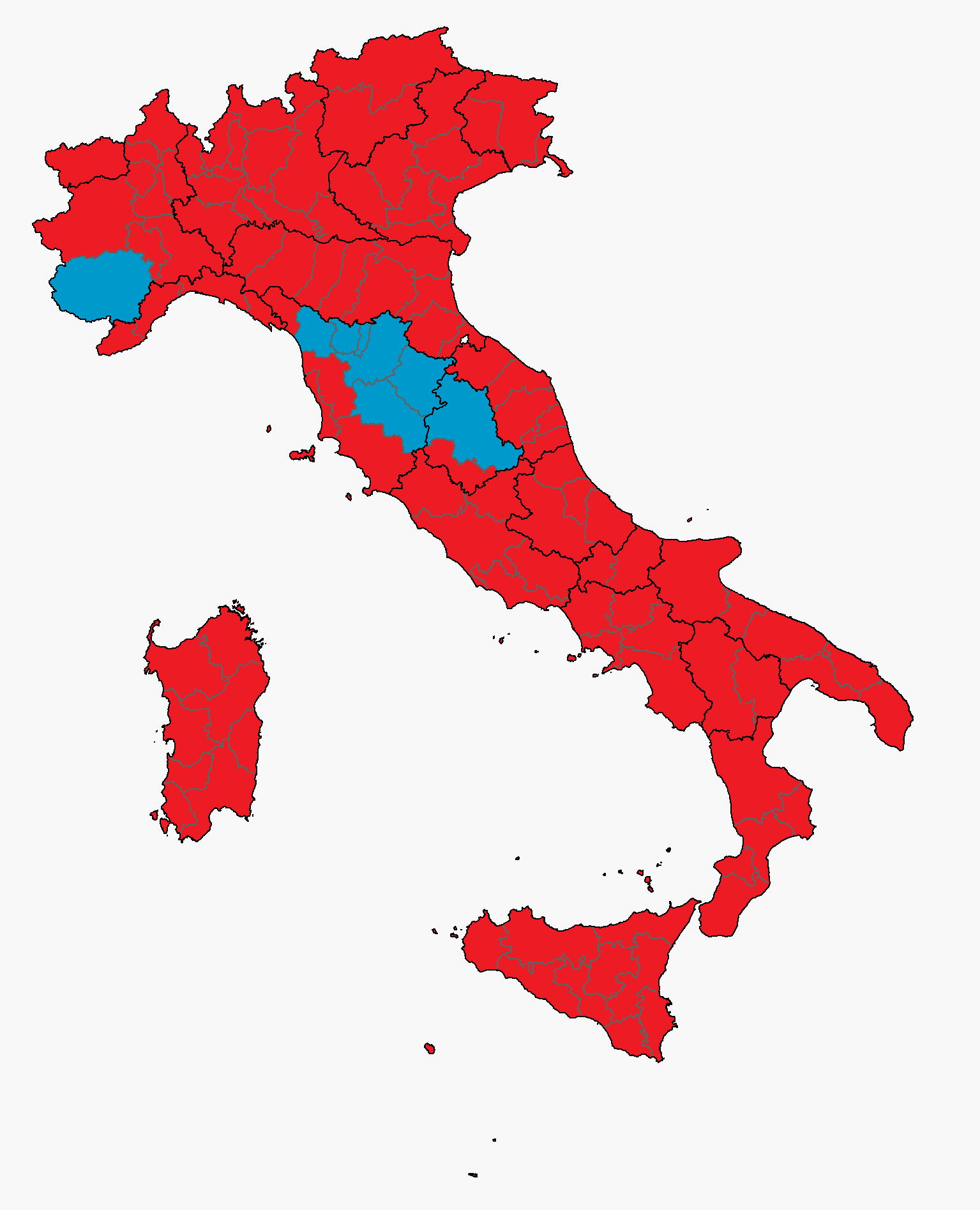
- Primary election results map. Red denotes provinces with a Bersani plurality and Azure denotes those with a Renzi plurality.

The 2012 Italian centre-left primary election determined the leader of the coalition Italy. Common Good, who will stand as common candidate for the office of Prime Minister in the subsequent general election, which took place on 24–25 February 2013. It was won with 61% of the votes by Pier Luigi Bersani, who defeated Matteo Renzi in the run-off.

The coalition, launched on 13 October 2012, comprises the Democratic Party (PD), Left Ecology Freedom (SEL) and the Italian Socialist Party (PSI).

Alliance for Italy (ApI), though officially still member of the centrist coalition New Pole for Italy, decided to take part in the contest, fielding a candidate from its own ranks.

== Background and rules ==
After a heated debate inside the PD, the primary election was announced by its leader Pier Luigi Bersani, on 8 June 2012, during a national direction of the party, even before the official coalition formation. Several bosses of the party openly opposed the decision, stating that Bersani was to be declared the coalition leader outright and deeming the primary process counterproductive for the party.

Defying the internal opposition, on 14 July, Bersani confirmed the decision, which was approved by the party's national assembly, and announced his intention to run. On 31 July Bersani presented a "Charter of Values" that every candidate must accept in order to take part to the election. The charter was soon endorsed by Nichi Vendola, leader of SEL, who, as widely expected, later said he would run too.

On 13 September Matteo Renzi (PD), mayor of Florence, officially announced his bid to become the coalition leader. The announcement came after a lengthy struggle, with his candidacy hotly contested by the PD governing body, since the party charter clearly states that the party leader (in this case Bersani) is automatically the party candidate for Prime Minister, so barring any other PD member from running in the primaries. Anyway, in the wake of a grassroots campaign in support of a broader contest, and with Bersani's own consent, the party statute was expressly modified to allow multiple candidatures.

On 13 October the centre-left coalition, named Italy. Common Good was officially formed, with the signature by the leaders of the coalition partners (Bersani for the PD, Vendola for SEL, and Riccardo Nencini for the PSI) of the common political platform (named Pact of Democrats and Progressives), largely based on the charter presented by Bersani two months before. The charter was somewhat controversial, since it lacked any reference to Mario Monti, despite the PD being a key supporter of his government; this was viewed as a concession to Nichi Vendola's SEL, which on the contrary staunchly opposes Monti.

The convention set the election rules too, fixing the first run on 25 November and, in case no candidate had secured more than 50% of the vote, a run-off on 2 December between the two front-runners. Many of the rules were soon contested by Renzi, who lambasted them for having been conceived to reduce turnout and thus favoring Bersani. On the other hand, Bersani defended the rules, explaining that they had the purpose to prevent raiding from right-wing supporters.

== Candidates ==
Portrait	Name	Logo	Details and notes
	Pier Luigi Bersani		Secretary of the Democratic Party; Member of Parliament; Former minister in Romano Prodi's II Cabinet; Former President of Emilia-Romagna
	Matteo Renzi		Mayor of Florence; Former President of the Province of Florence
	Nichi Vendola		Leader of Left Ecology Freedom; President of Apulia; Former Member of the Chamber of Deputies
	Laura Puppato		Regional councillor and leader of the opposition of Veneto; Former mayor of Montebelluna
	Bruno Tabacci		Member of the Chamber of Deputies; Former President of Lombardy

Other possible candidates included Giuseppe Civati, PD, and Valdo Spini, ex-PSI. The PSI chose not to field a candidate and supported Bersani instead.

The left-wing party Italy of Values (IdV), former coalition partner with the PD in the past general election, was excluded from the coalition mainly because of the attacks made by the party leader Antonio Di Pietro against the President of the Italian Republic Giorgio Napolitano about his strong support of the Monti Cabinet and his alleged implication in the State-Mafia negotiation of 1992-93. Nevertheless, the party unofficially backed Bersani in the contest.

== Campaign ==
=== First round ===
Unlike the previous centre-left primaries, which resulted in Romano Prodi's overwhelming victory over the radical left candidate (later President of the Chamber of Deputies) Fausto Bertinotti, this time the race was considered much more competitive, primarily because of Renzi's presence on the ballot.

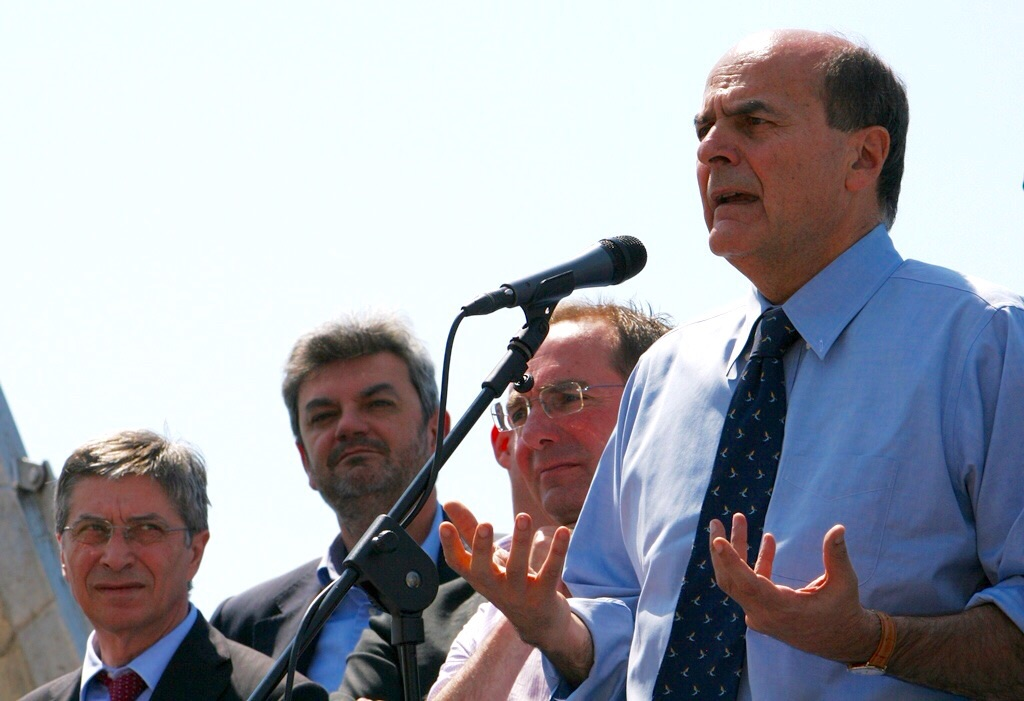
Bersani with the President of Emilia-Romagna, Vasco Errani, during the electoral campaign.

In fact, PD Secretary Pierluigi Bersani entered the campaign as a clear favorite, being able to cluster around himself the solid support of almost the whole party (he was endorsed by about the 90% of the over 300 PD MPs) and the highly influential CGIL. His leadership, however, was soon challenged by mayor Renzi, who already in 2011 had become the leader of a grassroots movement (defined Rottamazione, Scrappage) that called for a radical renewal of the party governing boards, considered responsible for the collapse of both Prodi governments and, more in general, the inability to counter Silvio Berlusconi's appeal and policies over the previous 20 years. Renzi's relatively young age and continuous attacks on several prominent party leaders (especially on former PM Massimo D'Alema, that ignited a heated squabble) helped him gain the label of "anti-establishment" candidate, and, in a climate of general deep discontent towards the whole political class, this resulted in a dramatic increase in popularity across the whole political spectrum. On the other hand, his political stances, based on a centrist platform and open to a moderate liberalism (with frequent remarks to Tony Blair's New Labour), alienated many leftists and led to the charge of trying to win the primaries by relying mostly on the support of right-wing electors.

Governor Nichi Vendola carried out a radical, left-wing campaign centered on the consequences of the Great Recession, openly endorsing the stances of the Occupy movement, with frequent attacks to the global financial system and the Monti Cabinet, seen as an emanation of the same lobbies that caused the crisis and keep strangling the poorer classes; while remaining committed to the idea of a federal Europe and to public debt reduction, he advocated a strong reduction in military expenses and a higher taxation on the richest (often citing François Hollande's fiscal reform). Civil rights, and in particular LGBT rights promotion was another key issue for Vendola, who is the most prominent openly gay Italian politician; during the campaign, he hit the headlines stating his will to marry his current partner and build a family. However, Vendola's campaign started in earnest only at the beginning of November, when he was acquitted in a corruption trial; if found guilty, he promised he would have left politics immediately.

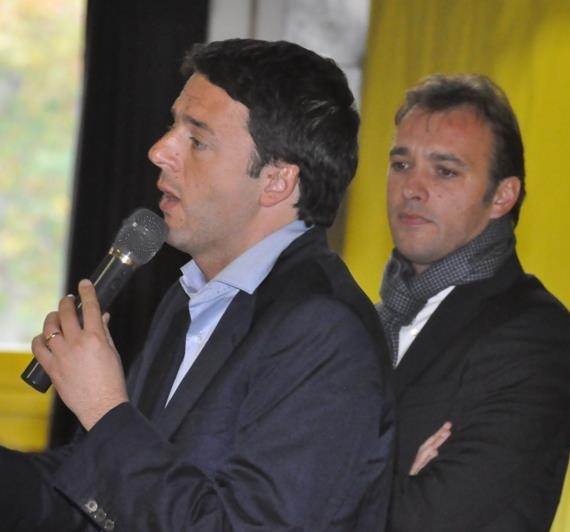
Matteo Renzi during the campaign for the primary election.

Puppato and Tabacci, unanimously considered underdogs, were left with little media coverage and generally neglected. Puppato, who as mayor of Montebelluna gained popularity for her environmentalist battles, belonged to the "green" faction of the PD and campaigned on sustainable development and green economy promotion; moreover, being the only woman to contest the race, she raised the issue of discrimination against women, particularly stressing the gender pay gap and the rise of domestic violence. Tabacci, whose candidacy was aimed at representing the moderate values in the primaries, emphasized honesty and responsibility in politics, gaining widespread respect for his coherence and moral integrity, even from the far left.

Secretary Pier Luigi Bersani countered Renzi's calls for Rottamazione with pledges to a deep but milder renewal in the party. He mounted up a campaign based on a mainstream social democratic platform, building his own image of reformist - during his tenure as minister in the Prodi II Cabinet, he became famous for his liberalization efforts, popularly called Lenzuolate - but firmly anchored to the values of the left; he was depicted as the "used safe", an experienced yet efficient politician, the only candidate capable of keeping together the coalition and with the standing needed to deal with the other European leaders.

Right from the start, being the PD by far the largest party in the coalition, the media reduced (somewhat forcedly) the contest to a race between Bersani and Renzi, with the former constantly leading in the polls by a comfortable margin but still below the 50% threshold needed to avoid the run-off. Trying to close the gap, Renzi toured all 108 Provinces of Italy with a camper, and repeatedly asked for a relaxation of the rules, since an increase in the turnout seemed to go to Renzi's advantage.

The electoral committee soon received many offers by all main TV channels to organize a debate among all candidates. In the end, the debate was held on 12 November and aired live in prime-time by Sky TG24 and Cielo, both belonging to the private television platform Sky Italia; this caused controversy, mainly because Italian public network RAI repeatedly demanded to host the event but was turned down. The debate, that was widely considered a success, being watched by over 1.5 million viewers, was narrowly won by Renzi, but the polls did not show any significant improvement in his numbers. Calls from both Vendola and Renzi to hold another public debate were denied by Bersani.

On election day, little more than 3 million people cast their vote, a sharp decline in turnout if compared to the previous primaries but well beyond the rosiest prospects nonetheless. As widely expected, Bersani gained a plurality but not an absolute majority, with Renzi coming distant second. Renzi came first in his native Tuscany, Umbria and Marche, widely known as the "reddest" regions of Italy, and was highly competitive in the rich North-West; on the other hand, Bersani won all major cities (with the exception of Renzi's Florence) and prevailed overwhelmingly in the South, where Renzi often yielded the second place to Vendola. The leader of SEL had disappointing results, coming third overall with only 15% of the votes and narrowly losing his own region to Bersani.

=== Second round ===
==== Vendola's endorsement ====
Vendola, leader of the leftist component of the coalition, soon declared his personal support for Bersani, initially only informally, later joining the PD Secretary in a common electoral rally in Naples; Vendola's widely expected endorsement ostensibly tilted the balance in Bersani's favor.

==== Renzi's last attack over the rules ====
Renzi countered by reviving the long-drawn-out strife over the rules, publicly inviting those who had not voted in the first round to register and take part to the run-off, though this was forbidden by the electoral committee.

As a matter of fact, the rules were somewhat ambiguous on that point, stating that those willing to vote in the second round had to justify their absence on the first, but an initially rather lenient interpretation was later reversed for a much stricter one, much to Renzi's chagrin, who openly denounced the attempt to rig the elections by the establishment-controlled electoral committee.

Bersani replied by officially charging his opponent with trying to raid the vote. All candidates who had been eliminated in the first round soon joined Bersani in his protests. Seeing that the attack over the rules had substantially backfired on him, on the last day of campaign Renzi gave up, promising to respect in any case the outcome of the vote.

In the end, over 120,000 more people applied to register, but only little more than 7,000 were actually allowed to vote.

==== The second debate ====
A second TV debate between the two candidates was held on 28 November, this time aired by Rai 1, the oldest and most popular Italian TV channel, again live and in prime-time. The debate lasted little less than two hours, hosted by TG1 leading anchorwoman Monica Maggioni, who posed questions drafted by the newsroom and posted by the audience in the TG1 website over the previous days. The debate featured hook-ups with electoral committees of both candidates, who too had the opportunity to ask questions.

Like the previous debate, the contest was dominated by fair-play, with no cheap shots and leaving alone the quarrel about the rules. Again, Renzi seemed more at ease with the quick TV pace and emerged as the clear winner, but Bersani held out, keeping his lead in the polls.

==== Election results ====
On 2 December Bersani won the run-off with around 61% of the vote, a higher margin than expected. Bersani again swept the South, that voted en masse for him, and swung to his column Umbria and Marche, thus leaving to Renzi only Tuscany. With Bersani's victory becoming apparent soon after the closing of the polls, Renzi quickly conceded, thanking his supporters and calling for party unity.

== Results ==
Candidates	Parties		1st round		2nd round	
Candidates	Parties		Votes	%	Votes	%
Pierluigi Bersani	Democratic Party (Partito Democratico)	PD	1,395,096	44.9	1,706,457	60.9
Matteo Renzi	Democratic Party (Partito Democratico)	PD	1,104,958	35.5	1,095,925	39.1
Nichi Vendola	Left Ecology Freedom (Sinistra Ecologia e Libertà)	SEL	485,689	15.6		
Laura Puppato	Democratic Party (Partito Democratico)	PD	80,628	2.6		
Bruno Tabacci	Alliance for Italy (Alleanza per l'Italia)	ApI	43,840	1.4		
Total			3,110,210	100	2,802,382	100

First round
Bersani	44.9%
Renzi	35.5%
Vendola	15.6%
Puppato	2.6%
Tabacci	1.4%

Second round
Bersani	60.9%
Renzi	39.1%
