= Linda Lanzillotta =

Italian politician (born 1948)

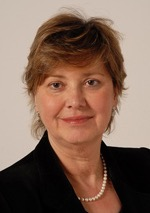

Vice-President of Senate
- In office 21 March 2013 – 22 March 2018
- President: Pietro Grasso
- Preceded by: Domenico Nania

Minister for Regional Affairs and Local Communities
- In office May 2006 – 2008
- Prime Minister: Romano Prodi
- Preceded by: Enrico La Loggia
- Succeeded by: Raffaele Fitto

Member of the Senate
- In office 15 March 2013 – 22 March 2018

Member of the Chamber of Deputies
- In office 28 April 2006 – 14 March 2013

Personal details
- Born: 7 September 1948 (age 77) Cassano all'Ionio, Calabria
- Party: PD (2007-2009; 2015-present)
- Other political affiliations: UCI(M-L) (1968-1978); PSI (1979-1993); DL (2002-2007); ApI (2009-2012); SC (2012-2015)
- Website: Official website

Linda Lanzillotta (born 7 September 1948) is an Italian politician. She was the minister for regional affairs and local communities between 2006 and 2008.

== Early life ==
Lanzillotta was born in Cassano all'Ionio, Calabria, in the Province of Cosenza on 7 September 1948.

== Career ==
Lanzillotta is a manager and academic. From 1970 to 1982 she worked at the ministry of budget and economic planning. She was a member of the Rome city council between 1997 and 1999. During this period she was the commissioner for economic, financial, and budgetary policy. She served as the secretary general to the Prime Minister's office for one year between 2000 and 2001. She was a faculty member at Rome 3 University from 2001 to 2005, where she taught courses on public management.

She was appointed minister for regional affairs and local communities in the cabinet led by Prime Minister Romano Prodi in May 2006. Her tenure lasted until 2008. She was a member of the Italian chamber of deputies for Alliance for Italy. She became a member of the Italian senate in February 2013 and was its vice-president until 2018.

She is a member of the Italy-USA Foundation. In addition, she is the founder and president of GLOCUS, an independent think tank, which she established in 2007 to promote reformist policies in Italy.
