= Pino Pisicchio =

Italian politician, journalist, essayist and professor

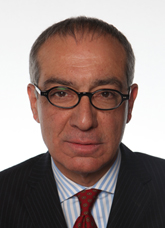

Member of the Chamber of Deputies
- In office 30 May 2001 – 22 March 2018
- In office 2 July 1987 – 14 April 1994

Member of the European Parliament
- In office 1 July 1999 – 1 July 2004

Personal details
- Born: 23 May 1954 (age 72) Corato, Apulia, Italy
- Party: DC (until 1994); RI (1997–2002); DL (2002–2006); IdV (2006–2009); ApI (2009–2012); CD (2012–2014); PDE (since 2014)
- Education: University of Bari

Giuseppe "Pino" Pisicchio (born 23 May 1954) is an Italian politician, journalist, essayist, and professor.

== Biography ==
Bon on 23 May 1954 in Corato, Pisicchio graduated in law with honors from the University of Bari. A member of the Christian Democracy, first in the current of Aldo Moro and then in left-wing current of Carlo Donat-Cattin, Pisicchio was elected for the first time to the Chamber of Deputies in 1987, with about 80,000 preference votes, and was re-confirmed also in 1992. He served as Undersecretary for Finance in the first Amato Government and then as Undersecretary for Public Works in the Ciampi Government.

In 1997, Pisicchio joined Italian Renewal, of which he was National Coordinator. In 1999 he elected to the European Parliament and joined the Group of the European People's Party - European Democrats, holding the positions of Deputy Chairman of the Committee on Budgets and of the Delegation to the EU-Maghreb Joint Parliamentary Committee. In 2001 he was re-elected to the Chamber among the ranks of The Daisy, in which Italian Renewal had merged.

In 2006, Pisicchio joined the Italy of Values and was re-elected to the Chamber of Deputies. Re-elected again to the Chamber in 2008, he became Vice President of the Committee for Elections. In November 2009 he left the IdV because, in his opinion, political line of the party was increasingly shifted towards radical antagonism. Consequently, he joined the Alliance for Italy of Francesco Rutelli.

In 2013, Pisicchio was re-elected Deputy with the Democratic Centre, becoming president of the Mixed Group of the Chamber of Deputies. On 26 June 2014 he left the Democratic Centre, following the disappointing result in the European elections of the same year.
