= Laura Puppato =

Italian politician (born 1957)

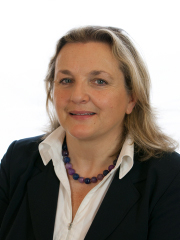

Personal details
- Born: 17 February 1957 (age 69) Crocetta del Montello, Veneto, Italy
- Party: Democratic Party
- Profession: Politician, Businesswoman in the insurance sector, Trade unionist

Laura Puppato (born 17 February 1957, Crocetta del Montello) is an Italian politician.

Puppato became engaged in politics in the 1990s within local environmentalist groups and was elected mayor of Montebelluna in 2002. She proved a very popular centre-left mayor in a Lega Nord's stronghold and was re-elected in 2007. In the 2010 regional election she was elected to the Regional Council of Veneto and was appointed floor leader of her party.

Puppato was a candidate in the 2012 centre-left primary election and came fourth (out of five competitors) with 2.6%. In the 2013 general election she was elected to the Senate as Venetian head of the list.

She was candidate for Senator in 2018 and for MEP in 2019, but she has not been elected.

She considers herself a cattolica adulta ("adult Catholic").

== Biography ==
Born in Crocetta del Montello, in the province of Treviso, she earned her teaching diploma and enrolled in the Political Science program, but interrupted her studies in her third year due to motherhood.

Laura Puppato lives in Cornuda. Divorced and a Catholic, she married for the first time at age 21 and had a daughter, Annagiulia, with her first husband. She married her second husband, Bruno, after they had been living together, when her second child, Francesco, was two years old.
