= Italy of Values =

Political party in Italy

Italy of Values Italia dei Valori
- Secretary: Ignazio Messina
- Founder: Antonio Di Pietro
- Founded: 21 March 1998 (first iteration); 2000 (second iteration)
- Dissolved: 1999 (first iteration)
- Headquarters: via Carlo Goldoni 9, Palermo
- Newspaper: Orizzonti Nuovi
- Youth wing: Giovani dell'Italia dei Valori
- Ideology: Populism; Anti-corruption
- Political position: Centre-left (Note: The political position of the party is not uniquely agreed. IdV as a party has been variously described as centrist, centre-left, and left-wing.)
- National affiliation: The Union (2005–08) with the PD (2008–11); Civil Revolution (2013); Popular Civic List (2017–18); CAL (2022); Us Moderates (2022–present)
- European affiliation: ELDR/ALDE Party (former member)
- European Parliament group: ELDR/ALDE Group (2004–14)
- Chamber of Deputies: 0 / 400
- Senate: 0 / 200
- European Parliament: 0 / 76
- Regional Councils: 0 / 896

Website
- italiadeivalori.it

Italy of Values (Italian: Italia dei Valori, IdV) is a populist and anti-corruption political party in Italy. The party was founded in 1998 by former Mani pulite prosecutor Antonio Di Pietro, who entered politics in 1996 and finally left the party in 2014. IdV has aimed at gathering and giving voice to different sectors of the Italian society. From the beginning of its existence one of its major issues has been the so-called "moral issue". In the early 2010s, IdV was eclipsed by the new-born Five Star Movement, founded by comedian Beppe Grillo, which used the same populist and anti-corruption rhetoric.

== History ==
=== Background and formation (1996–2001) ===
Antonio Di Pietro was minister of Public Works in the Prodi I Cabinet from May to November 1996, when he resigned because he was under investigation in Brescia. In November 1997 Di Pietro was elected senator for The Olive Tree in a by-election in Mugello, a stronghold of the Democrats of the Left (DS) in Tuscany, with 67.7% of the vote, much more than centre-right independent Giuliano Ferrara (16.1%) and Communist Sandro Curzi (13.0%).

In March 1998, Di Pietro established Italy of Values (IdV), alongside Willer Bordon of the Democratic Union and Rino Piscitello and Franco Danieli of The Network, led by Leoluca Orlando (a future IdV member).

In February 1999, Di Pietro integrated IdV into The Democrats, a new centrist party founded by Romano Prodi with the goal of transforming The Olive Tree coalition in a single "Democratic" party. In the 1999 European Parliament election The Democrats scored 7.7% and Di Pietro was elected MEP. He was also appointed organisational secretary and Senate floor leader of the party. In April 2000, Di Pietro abruptly left in opposition to the appointment of Giuliano Amato, a long-time member of the Italian Socialist Party (which was the main subject of investigation of Di Pietro as prosecutor), as Prime Minister of Italy after the resignation of Massimo D'Alema. Shortly afterwards, Di Pietro set up IdV again.

IdV took part in the 2001 general election as a stand-alone party on a populist platform, which included tough management of illegal immigration and protest against waste of public money. IdV's campaign was focused principally against Silvio Berlusconi, who was the candidate for Prime Minister of the House of Freedoms (CdL) centre-right coalition. IdV won 3.9% in the election, 0.1% short of the 4% threshold, and obtained no seats in the Chamber of Deputies. The party elected one senator, Valerio Carrara, but, a few days after the election, he surprisingly switched to Berlusconi's Forza Italia (FI) party, leaving IdV without parliamentary representation for the next five years.

=== From isolation to electoral success (2001–2009) ===
In the 2004 European Parliament election Di Pietro teamed up with Achille Occhetto, a former leader of the Italian Communist Party (PCI) and the Democratic Party of the Left (PDS), under the banner "Civil Society Di Pietro–Occhetto". The electoral list gained 2.1% of the national vote and both men were elected MEPs. After the election, Occhetto immediately renounced his seat and was replaced by Giulietto Chiesa, a communist journalist, who sat with the Party of European Socialists Group.

In 2005 IdV joined The Union, a new centre-left coalition led by Prodi, who won the primary election with 74.2% of the vote, defeating also Di Pietro (3.3%). In early 2006 Leoluca Orlando, former mayor of Palermo, some splinters from the Union of Democrats for Europe (UDEUR), including Pino Pisicchio and Egidio Pedrini, and former DS such as Fabio Evangelisti and Federico Palomba, joined the party, in an effort of broadening its electoral base.

The Union narrowly won the 2006 general election, IdV scored a mere 2.1% and Di Pietro was sworn in as Minister of Infrastructures in the Prodi II Cabinet.

After the fall of Prodi's government, Di Pietro formed an alliance with the Democratic Party (PD) for the 2008 general election. The coalition was defeated by Berlusconi's centre-right, but IdV obtained 4.4% of the vote, 29 deputies and 14 senators. Following the election, IdV formed its own groups in the Chamber of Deputies and the Senate, instead of joining the Democrats in a joint group as promised, and started a competition with its main ally. In October 2008, Veltroni, who distanced from Di Pietro many times, declared that "on some issues he [Di Pietro] is distant from the democratic language of the centre-left"; however, the PD decided to support Carlo Costantini (IdV) in the 2008 regional election in Abruzzo. Costantini was defeated, but in the event IdV came close to the PD (15.0%–19.6%).

In the 2009 European Parliament election the list got 8.0% of the national vote, quadrupling the votes obtained five years before and gaining 7 seats. In the run-up for the election Di Pietro recruited to run in IdV lists Pino Arlacchi, a former senator for the DS, Gianni Vattimo, a left-wing philosopher, Maurizio Zipponi, a former trade unionist and deputy of the Communist Refoundation Party (PRC), and Luigi de Magistris, a left-wing former prosecutor of Catanzaro who inquired Romano Prodi. Arlacchi, De Magistris and Vattimo were all elected to the European Parliament. From the results of the European election, IdV was the fourth largest party in the country.

Following these results, Di Pietro said that IdV "will remove his name from the symbol of the party, in order to build something larger, more useful and that represents something more important". He also said that "we need to become a great progressive party that supports a proposal for a credible government". The party's executive decided not to remove the name of its founder, considering that name still too important for the party.

=== Populist turn and discontents (2009–2013) ===
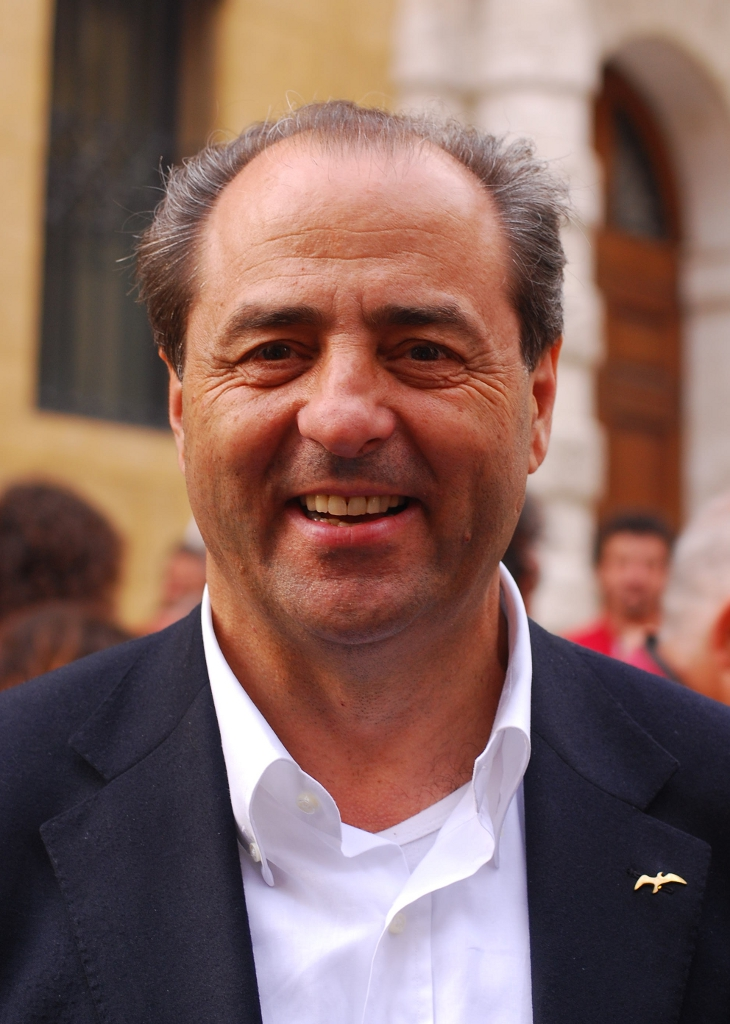
Antonio Di Pietro in 2010

Since de Magistris's strong showing in the 2009 European election there was talk of an underground row between him and Di Pietro for the leadership of the party. Moreover, as some members of the party were entailed with corruption charges, others like Francesco Barbato urged Di Pietro to be more earnest in cleaning up the party. De Magistris, keen on aligning the party with the far left and the most radical groups in opposition to Berlusconi, dubbed Di Pietro as too moderate and denounced that the party "risks of becoming the DC of the third millennium". While the party's grassroots supported a change of leadership and de Magistris initially did not rule this out, the party's old guard (Silvana Mura, Massimo Donadi, Felice Belisario, Luigi Li Gotti and Leoluca Orlando) staunchly defended the leader. Finally an agreement was reached between the two: during 5–7 February 2010 party congress de Magistris would support Di Pietro in exchange of a leading role in the party. In any event Di Pietro was re-elected as party president unopposed, while de Magistris did not become party secretary as he wanted.

The populist course taken by the party, that enforced its co-operation with the far left, and the emergence of more "extreme" figures like de Magistris led Pino Pisicchio and his centrist faction to leave the party in order to join Francesco Rutelli's Alliance for Italy (ApI) in November 2009. While leaving the party along with other three MPs, Pisicchio told the press that lining up IdV in the "antagonist camp" was a departure from its original nature of a "centrist party of liberal-democratic inspiration". Giuseppe Astore, a senator, offered similar views: "De Magistris is too far on the left for me ... . I want a reformist not an extremist party". In the summer of 2010 two MEPs, Arlacchi and Vincenzo Iovine, left IdV citing the lack of democracy in the party. Arlacchi, a former senator of the PDS, joined the PD, while Iovine, a former Christian Democrat, the ApI. In December two deputies, Antonio Razzi and Domenico Scilipoti, left the party in order to support Berlusconi's government.

In early 2011 IdV proposed three referendums. Thanks to its activists, the party was able to collect two million signatures among the Italian population in support of these referendums, which were concerned with the abrogation of the so-called legittimo impedimento (an Italian law which permits the Prime Minister to postpone potential trials if prosecuted by the judiciary), the abrogation of a law allowing the construction of nuclear power plants in Italy and the abrogation of a law allowing the privatisation of water management. The referendums took place in June 2011 and the "yes" prevailed in all three cases.

On 30 May 2011 de Magistris was elected mayor of Naples by a landslide. The IdV candidate, who had received just 27.5% of the vote in the first round (enough to beat the Democratic candidate off the second round), won a thumping 65.4% of the vote against the centre-right candidate in the run-off. This was a huge success for IdV and its main ally, the Federation of the Left, which together also gained the majority in the municipal council. On 21 May 2012 the party had another major electoral breakthrough when Leoluca Orlando was elected mayor of Palermo with 72.4% of the vote in a run-off. Both mayors would distance from IdV in a few years.

In October 2012 IdV came under pressure after some news inquiries reported obscurities in party finances, while suffering heavy losses in opinion polls due to the success of a new protest party led by comedian Beppe Grillo, the Five Star Movement (M5S). In an interview to Il Fatto Quotidiano, Di Pietro declared IdV "dead" and, foreseeing its exclusion from Parliament after the next election, stated that the party would fight from the outside and would endorse the M5S. Grillo proposed Di Pietro as President of the Republic, but ruled out any alliance between M5S and IdV. The interview caused unrest within party ranks and led to the exit of a "moderate" wing led by Massimo Donadi, who was replaced as floor leader in the Chamber by Antonio Borghesi. Donadi, along with other three deputies (Nello Formisano, Giovanni Paladini and Gaetano Porcino) and one senator (Stefano Pedica), launched Rights and Freedom (DL), which later joined the Democratic Centre (CD).

In October 2012, de Magistris quit the party and formed the Orange Movement (MA), which was joined by many IdV left-wingers. As soon as late December, both IdV and MA were founding components of Civil Revolution (RC), a far-left coalition led by Antonio Ingroia.

=== Decline and re-organisation (2013–present) ===
In the 2013 general election RC won a mere 2.2% of the vote and IdV was thus out of Parliament for the first time in almost ten years.

After RC's debacle, Di Pietro resigned from party president. On 13 May Di Pietro, on behalf of the party's executive, announced that the experience of RC was over for IdV and that the party would elect a new leader during a congress to be held in June. In the meantime, Leoluca Orlando, Felice Belisario, Carlo Costantini and other leading members of IdV left the party to launch the 139 Movement (139 being the number of the articles of the Italian Constitution).

In the 2014 European election, IdV received just 0.65% of the vote, losing the party's remaining representation in the European Parliament.

In the party congress, convened for 28–30 June, delegates chose the new leader, a secretary instead of a president, among five candidates: Antonio Borghesi, Matteo Castellarin, Ignazio Messina, Niccolò Rinaldi and Nicola Scalera. In the last ballot Messina was elected with 69.1% of the vote over Rinaldi, who had received the endorsements of Borghesi, Castellarin and Scalera. In October Di Pietro left the party altogether.

Since 2015 the party was joined by three senators (Alessandra Bencini, Maurizio Romani and Francesco Molinari) and saw the return of a deputy (Formisano). In 2017, Formisano left again in order to join the Democratic and Progressive Movement (MDP), which was also joined by Di Pietro.

In December 2017 IdV was a founding member of the Popular Civic List (CP), a centrist electoral list within the centre-left coalition, along with Popular Alternative (AP), the Centrists for Europe (CpE), Solidary Democracy (DemoS), the Union for Trentino (UpT), Italy Is Popular (IP), and minor parties/groups.

In the 2018 general election, CP obtained 0.5% and no seats, and IdV was again excluded from Parliament.

In 2022, Ignazio Messina announced the federation of IdV with Us with Italy and the support for Us Moderates (a centrist list within the centre-right coalition) in the 2022 general election.

== Ideology and factions ==
While the party had been generally aligned with the centre-left, its members had been very diverse ideologically, ranging from the far left (i.e. Franca Rame, a former member of Soccorso Rosso, and Pancho Pardi, a former activist of Potere Operaio) to the right, thanks to the populist message of the party. The party includes former Communists and former LN members, as well as former MSI members and several former Christian Democrats. According to 2009 a study by Pino Pisicchio, a political scientist who was then deputy of IdV, 57.1% of the party's MPs were former Christian Democrats or members of post-Christian Democratic parties (including 11.9% from the UDEUR), 9.5% were former Communists, 4.8% came from far-left parties and movements, 2.4% were former MSI members and 2.4% former LN members.

The party is a supporter of legality, law and order, the police forces, first-past-the-post voting, federalism, corporate reform, lowering the costs of politics, improving the efficiency of public services, fighting corruption, simplifying trials bureaucracy to achieve faster verdicts and regulating conflict of interest.

During the Prodi II Cabinet IdV was one of the most centrist voices in the centre-left coalition and sometimes, despite its harsh criticism of Berlusconi, it switched sides in Parliament on some key issues. At some point, Di Pietro even proposed an electoral alliance between its party, the UDEUR and the Union of Christian and Centre Democrats (UDC), while ruling out any future alliance with the far left. Also during the Berlusconi IV Cabinet, IdV supported some plans of the government, notably the introduction of fiscal federalism; however, due to its uncompromising anti-berlusconismo, IdV has been at times very popular among left-wing voters, a fact that was highlighted also by the increasing number of communists in party ranks and often forms stable alliances with the parties of the far left at the local level, such as in the case of Luigi de Magistris' election as mayor of Naples or in the 2012 regional election in Sicily. The shift to the left embodied by the emergence of figures like de Magistris and Franco Grillini (honorary president of Arcigay, who joined in November 2009). was criticised by Pisicchio because, in his view, it was endangering the centrist nature of the party. The party has also continued to recruit people on the right, such as Alessandro Cè, a social-conservative former member of Lega Nord.

The fact that IdV was a member of the Alliance of Liberals and Democrats for Europe Party, formerly known as European Liberal Democrat and Reform Party (ELDR), does not mean that it is a liberal party. Notwithstanding its former European affiliation, the party has rarely been regarded as liberal in Italy due to its "justicialist" and "populist" tendencies; the party's character is that of a "protest party" and it opposes many policies generally supported by liberals. On the left, Di Pietro is described as a right-wing populist by Fausto Bertinotti, as well as by some political commentators. According to Panorama, the reason for these bitter comments by Bertinotti is that Di Pietro is very able to attract votes from the far-left electorate, as well as the right, and this could prevent a resurgence of those parties which were driven out of Parliament in the 2008 general election. During a council meeting in Rome, ELDR President Annemie Neyts-Uyttebroeck underlined that European Liberals are honored to have IdV as one of its Italian member parties as it exemplifies a political party of integrity and high quality politics. Di Pietro added that "ELDR as the common house of European Liberals is the political home for us in terms of common convictions and a strong support for the cause of political freedoms in Italy". During the 2010 party congress, Di Pietro remarked IdV's liberal identity and denounced what he called "Berlusconi's false liberalism".

In May 2012, IdV became the first Italian political party to announce publicly that it would push for marriage equality. Di Pietro said: "Our party has been the first in Italy to follow U.S. president Barack Obama. We invite other Italian parties to support gay marriage. You don't have to be shy, you have to say yes".

== Popular support ==
The 2001–2010 electoral results in the 10 most populated regions of Italy, plus Abruzzo and Molise (the party's main strongholds), are shown in the table below. Generally speaking, the party is stronger in the South than in the North, where the protest vote is absorbed primarily by Lega Nord.

	2001 general	2004 European	2005 regional	2006 general	2008 general	2009 European	2010 regional
Piedmont	4.1	2.4	1.5	2.6	5.0	8.7	6.9
Lombardy	3.9	1.7	1.4	2.0	4.0	6.5	6.3
Veneto	4.6	2.1	1.3	2.2	4.3	7.2	5.3
Emilia-Romagna	3.5	1.9	1.4	1.7	4.2	7.2	6.4
Tuscany	2.5	1.8	0.9	1.4	3.5	6.8	9.4
Lazio	2.8	2.1	1.0	1.9	4.1	8.3	8.6
Abruzzo	6.3	3.9	2.4	4.1	7.0	13.8	15.0 (2008)
Molise	14.3	7.8	8.8 (2006)	8.1	27.7	28.0	8.8 (2011)
Campania	3.8	2.1	2.4	2.6	4.7	8.9	4.5
Apulia	5.1	2.8	2.4	1.8	4.6	8.9	6.5
Calabria	3.6	2.3	-	2.2	3.6	9.1	5.4
Sicily	3.9	2.7	(2006)	4.4	3.4	7.1	1.9 (2008)
ITALY	3.9	2.1	-	2.3	4.4	8.0	-

== Electoral results ==
=== Italian Parliament ===
Election	Leader	Chamber of Deputies				Senate of the Republic			
Election	Leader	Votes	%	Seats	+/–	Votes	%	Seats	+/–
2001	Antonio Di Pietro	1,443,725	4.0	0 / 630	New	1,140,489	3.4	1 / 315	New
2006	Antonio Di Pietro	877,159	2.3	20 / 630	▲20	986,046	2.8	5 / 315	▲4
2008	Antonio Di Pietro	1,593,675	4.4	29 / 630	▲9	1,414,118	4.2	14 / 315	▲9
2013	Antonio Di Pietro	Into RC		0 / 630	▼29	Into RC		0 / 315	▼14
2018	Ignazio Messina	Into CP		0 / 630	0	Into CP		0 / 315	0

=== European Parliament ===
Election	Leader	Votes	%	Seats	+/–	EP Group
1999	Antonio Di Pietro	Into Dem		1 / 87	New	ELDR
2004	Antonio Di Pietro	695,179 (10th)	2.1	2 / 78	▲1	ALDE
2009	Antonio Di Pietro	2,450,643 (4th)	8.0	7 / 72	▲5	ALDE
2014	Ignazio Messina	181,373 (10th)	0.7	0 / 73	▼7	–

=== Regional Councils ===
Region	Election year	Votes	%	Seats	+/–
Aosta Valley	2018	—N/a	—N/a	0 / 35	–
Piedmont	2014	13,658 (13th)	0.7	0 / 50	▼3
Lombardy	2018	into CP	–	0 / 80	–
South Tyrol	2018	—N/a	—N/a	0 / 35	–
Trentino	2018	—N/a	—N/a	0 / 35	–
Veneto	2015	into VC	–	0 / 51	▼3
Friuli-Venezia Giulia	2018	—N/a	—N/a	0 / 49	–
Emilia-Romagna	2014	into CpB	–	0 / 50	▼2
Liguria	2015	—N/a	—N/a	0 / 31	▼3
Tuscany	2015	—N/a	—N/a	0 / 41	▼5
Marche	2015	into UpM	–	0 / 31	▼4
Umbria	2015	—N/a	—N/a	0 / 20	▼1
Lazio	2018	into CP	–	0 / 51	–
Abruzzo	2019	5,577 (14th)	0.9	0 / 31	▼1
Molise	2018	—N/a	—N/a	0 / 21	▼1
Campania	2015	25,913 (16th)	1.1	1 / 51	▼3
Apulia	2015	into ESdP	–	0 / 51	▼6
Basilicata	2019	—N/a	—N/a	0 / 21	–
Calabria	2014	—N/a	—N/a	0 / 30	▼3
Sicily	2017	—N/a	—N/a	0 / 70	–
Sardinia	2019	—N/a	—N/a	0 / 60	▼1

== Leadership ==
- President / Secretary: Antonio Di Pietro (1998–1999, 2000–2013), Ignazio Messina (2013–present)
- Honorary President: Antonio Di Pietro (2013–2014)
- Spokesperson: Alessandra Paradisi (1998–1999), Elio Veltri (2000–2002), Giorgio Calò (2002–2005), Nello Formisano (2005–2006), Leoluca Orlando (2006–2013)
- Organisation Coordinator: Antonio Borghesi (2000–2005), Felice Belisario (2005–2008), Ivan Rota (2008–2013), Luciano Pisanello (2013–2017)
- Treasurer: Silvana Mura (2000–2013), Ivan Rota (2013–present)
- Party Leader in the Chamber of Deputies: Massimo Donadi (2006–2012), Antonio Borghesi (2012–2013), Nello Formisano (2014–2016)
- Party Leader in the Senate: Aniello Formisano (2006–2008), Felice Belisario (2008–2013), Alessandra Bencini (2015–2018)
- Party Leader in the European Parliament: Niccolò Rinaldi (2009–2013), Giommaria Uggias (2013–2014)
