= Italia. Bene Comune =

- Leader: Pier Luigi Bersani
- Founded: 13 October 2012
- Dissolved: 28 April 2013
- Ideology: Social democracy Democratic socialism Christian democracy Social liberalism
- Political position: Centre-left
- Colours: Red, Green

Italia. Bene Comune (Italy. Common Good, IBC) was a centre-left political list and electoral alliance in Italy created to stand at the 2013 Italian general election. It de facto ended on 28 April 2013, with PD's new leader Enrico Letta forming a grand coalition cabinet.

== History ==
The alliance was announced on 31 July 2012 by the Secretary of the Democratic Party Pier Luigi Bersani and officially launched on 13 October, with the signature of a common political platform.

By the terms of the agreement, each party in the coalition stood separately in the 2013 general election. However, all parties agreed to support a single candidate as Prime Minister. Bersani was elected as the coalition's leader and candidate for prime minister in the primary election held on 25 November and 2 December.

In the election, the coalition gained a plurality in both houses of the Italian parliament, garnering 29.6% of the vote in the Chamber and 31.6% of the vote in the Senate. Although IBC had a solid majority of seats in the Chamber, it came up short of a majority in the Senate, thus leaving it unable to form a government on its own. Consequently, Bersani resigned from party leadership and the PD joined a grand coalition government, led by the PD's Enrico Letta.

Primary election results
| Candidates | Party | First round | | Second round | |
| Candidates | Party | Votes | % | Votes | % |
|---|---|---|---|---|---|
| Pier Luigi Bersani | PD | 1,395,096 | 44.9 | 1,706,457 | 60.9 |
| Matteo Renzi | PD | 1,104,958 | 35.5 | 1,095,925 | 39.1 |
| Nichi Vendola | SEL | 485,689 | 15.6 | | |
| Laura Puppato | PD | 80,628 | 2.6 | | |
| Bruno Tabacci | CD | 43,840 | 1.4 | | |
| All votes total | | 3,181,626 | | 2,741,685 | |
| Blank and invalid votes | | 2,659 | 0.22 | 8,930 | 0.32 |

== Composition ==
The alliance was composed by the following parties:

| Party | Ideology | Leader |
|---|---|---|
| Democratic Party (PD) | Social democracy | Pier Luigi Bersani |
| Left Ecology Freedom (SEL) | Democratic socialism | Nichi Vendola |
| Democratic Centre (CD) | Christian democracy | Bruno Tabacci |
| Italian Socialist Party (PSI) | Social democracy | Riccardo Nencini |

Also part of the alliance were regional parties such as the South Tyrolean People's Party (in South Tyrol), Trentino Tyrolean Autonomist Party (in Trentino), Autonomy Liberty Participation Ecology (in Aosta Valley), Moderates (in Piedmont), and The Megaphone (in Sicily). Additionally, the Greens of South Tyrol formed a local electoral pact with SEL in South Tyrol.

== Election results ==
| Election | Leader | Chamber of Deputies | | | | Senate of the Republic | | | |
| Election | Leader | Votes | % | Seats | Position | Votes | % | Seats | Position |
|---|---|---|---|---|---|---|---|---|---|
| 2013 | Pier Luigi Bersani | 10,049,393 | 29.55 | 345 / 630 | 1st | 9,686,683 | 31.6 | 127 / 315 | 1st |
