= Giacomo Portas =

Italian politician

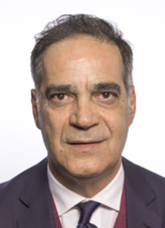

Member of the Chamber of Deputies
- In office 29 April 2008 – 13 October 2022
- Constituency: Piedmont 1

Personal details
- Born: 27 September 1959 (age 66) Iglesias, Italy
- Party: Moderates
- Profession: Politician, company manager

Giacomo Portas (born 27 September 1959 in Iglesias, Sardinia) is an Italian politician.

== Biography ==
Giacomo Portas was born in Iglesias, but he later moved to Turin.

In 2005 founded the Moderates' party, rooted mainly in Piedmont and allied with the centre-left.

In 2008 he was elected to the Chamber of Deputies in the Democratic Party's list. He was re-elected deputy also in 2013 and 2018, still into the Democratic Party.

In 2019 he joined the Italia Viva's parliamentary group.
