= Giuseppe Bicchielli =

Italian politician (born 1967)

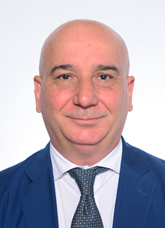
- Bicchielli in 2022

Member of the Chamber of Deputies
- Incumbent
- Assumed office 13 October 2022
- Constituency: Campania 2 – U06

Personal details
- Born: 31 March 1967 (age 59)
- Party: Forza Italia (since 2025)

Giuseppe Bicchielli (born 31 March 1967) is an Italian politician serving as a member of the Chamber of Deputies since 2022. He has served as chairman of the inquiry committee on hydrogeological and seismic risk since 2025.
