= Massimo Donadi =

Italian politician from Veneto

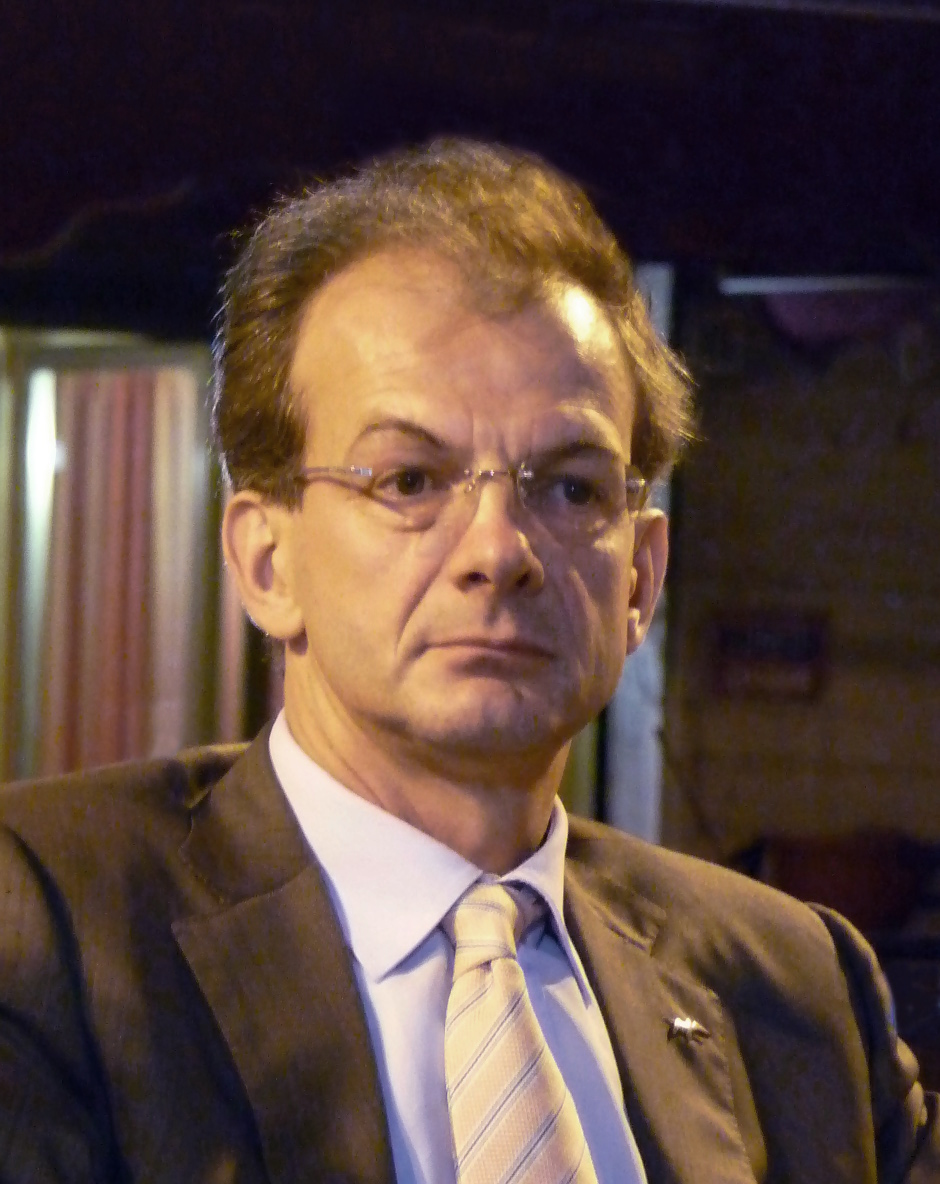
Massimo Donadi

Massimo Donadi (born 11 February 1963 in Venice, Italy) is an Italian politician from Veneto.

Having joined Italy of Values (IdV) in 2000, he was elected to the Italian Senate in a by-election held in January 2005. He was elected to the Italian Chamber of Deputies in 2006 and re-elected in 2008. Since 2006 Donadi has been IdV floor leader in the Chamber.

In the run-up of the Venetian regional election of 2010 Donadi was mentioned as a possible candidate for president.
